= List of Law & Order: LA characters =

Fictional character list

This is an overview of regular and recurring characters on the NBC legal drama Law & Order: LA.

Law & Order: LA, a spin-off of the crime drama Law & Order, follows the detectives who work in the Robbery-Homicide Division of the Los Angeles Police Department, a unit that focuses on homicide related crimes featuring two homicide detectives, a senior partner and a junior partner, who investigate the crime, collect evidence, and interview witnesses while regularly reporting to the commanding officer, Lieutenant Arleen Gonzalez (Rachel Ticotin). The evidence leads to the arrest of one or more suspects. The matter then is taken over by the prosecutors of the Los Angeles County District Attorney's Office: the junior deputy district attorney and senior deputy district attorney; they discuss deals, prepare the witnesses and evidence, and conduct the people's case in the trial. The series generally shows two deputy district attorneys working in the District Attorney's office, in alternating episodes under the leadership of District Attorney Jerry Hardin (Peter Coyote).

Due to low ratings, NBC cancelled the series on May 13, 2011.

== Main characters ==
Season	Senior Detective	Junior Detective	Police Commanding Officer	Deputy District Attorney (First chair)		Deputy District Attorney (Second chair)	
Season	Senior Detective	Junior Detective	Police Commanding Officer	Team A	Team B	Team A	Team B
1	Rex Winters (Skeet Ulrich)	Tomas "TJ" Jaruszalski (Corey Stoll)	Arleen Gonzalez (Rachel Ticotin) (Wanda De Jesus), pilot	Ricardo Morales (Alfred Molina)	Jonah "Joe" Dekker (Terrence Howard)	Evelyn Price (Regina Hall)	Lauren Stanton (Megan Boone)
1	Ricardo Morales (Alfred Molina)	Tomas "TJ" Jaruszalski (Corey Stoll)	Arleen Gonzalez (Rachel Ticotin) (Wanda De Jesus), pilot	Jonah "Joe" Dekker (Terrence Howard)	Vacant	Connie Rubirosa (Alana de la Garza)	Vacant

=== Police ===
==== Ricardo Morales ====
- Portrayed by Alfred Molina.
- Episodes: "Hollywood" – "Westwood"
  "Hollywood" – "Zuma Canyon", "Plummer Park" – "Westwood" (Prosecutor)
  "Silver Lake" – "Angel's Knoll" (Detective)

Ricardo Morales is a veteran detective in the Robbery-Homicide Division of the Los Angeles Police Department only after giving up a career in the district attorney's office after becoming frustrated with the justice system and the prosecutorial politics involved in trying to convict a Mexican drug dealer, who in turn got away with kidnapping charges along with multiple counts of murder and manslaughter charges.

Morales has a deep abiding sense of justice. He got his work ethic from his father, a groundskeeper at Hillcrest Country Club who took great pride in his work. His father and mother are Latino immigrants, he has a few brothers and sisters, and one daughter – Karina – who doesn't live with him, likely the result of a divorce. Morales returns to the LAPD after Rex Winters is murdered, causing problems such as coerced confessions, officer involved shootings, and believed to have done witness tampering; which causes others, including Morales to question his efficiency as a police officer.

==== Tomas Jaruszalski ====
- Portrayed by Corey Stoll.
- Episodes: "Hollywood" – "Westwood"

Often called "TJ", Jaruszalski is a Hollywood native with a cynical view of the entertainment industry. Much of Jaruszalski's dialogue consists of sarcastic, pun-heavy observations delivered at dramatically opportune moments. Jaruszalski has knowledge about narcotics after spending three years in Vice, along with living a childhood close to drugs. It's hinted in "Playa Vista" that Jaruszalski goes to nightclubs during his off time. Jaruszalski tells Morales that he started a rock band with his friends when he was younger, and that the band managed to lead Offspring in the charts.

Jaruszalski is stricken with grief and anger after Winters's death, seen especially when he pulls the perpetrator, Cesar Vargas, of Winters's murder out of an SUV, shoves him on the ground, and throws him into the back of a police car, kicking his feet into the car. Vargas would escape from authorities and Jaruszalski will continue to search for Winters' murderer in future episodes; he is shown communicating by e-mail with someone from the DEA on Vargas sightings and requests photos of those sightings where the DEA replies back with surveillance photos. Based on one of the photos, he decides to cross border, telling the border patrol he is going scuba diving, in order to meet with the local contact who introduces him to one of Vargas' women who also has her own personal reasons for helping take down Vargas. When he returns to the US, two Mexicans followed him from Mexico to kill him. Since he killed one and knocked the other one out, he had no choice but to report it. When Gonzalez arrives, she asks him if this is about Vargas, he lies saying that "maybe he didn't like my size 13 in his face" to which Gonzalez responds, "That's all that better be". At the crime scene, they find the address of Winter's wife, Casey, jotted down. Morales and TJ go to Casey's house to tell her that she needs to go to her mother's. At the end of the episode, Gonzalez looks at the empty seat of Jaruszalski to which Morales says he had a few sick days coming. The episode ends with Morales calling Jaruszalski and it shows his phone ringing in a Mexican motel with him not there. This apparently was supposed to be the cliffhanger to the first season.

In "Silver Lake", Jaruszalski had mixed feelings about Morales changing from prosecutor back to detective, but they go away by the end of the episode. Morales is involved in a shooting – which T.J. did not see – which causes him to see the police psychiatrist; in the session, other than his state of mind at the time of the shooting, he talked about Winters's murder and the effect it had on Jaruszalski. The defense attorney wanted to have Morales's psych evaluation admitted into open court; Morales left TJ with the choice to have it admitted or not, and Jaruszalski eventually gave him the go-ahead.

==== Arleen Gonzalez ====
- Portrayed by Rachel Ticotin; Wanda De Jesus in the pilot episode.
- Episodes: "Hollywood" – "Westwood"

Gonzalez is the Commanding Officer of the LAPD Robbery Homicide Division, Gonzalez is a cool professional who keeps her personal life private. She has a law degree. She is a passionate advocate for her detectives. She is fluent in Spanish and comes from a Mexican background. When a defendant in a murder case uses an edited tape of a speech Gonzalez gave to paint her as a racist, she comes out as a lesbian to explain how the bigotry she faces has led her to overcome her own bigotry. Gonzalez has one son, who was born in 1999. She pulls a few strings to get Morales into homicide as TJ's new partner. She can be seen rattled when Winters died in the hospital after getting shot.

=== District Attorneys ===
==== Jonah Dekker ====
- Portrayed by Terrence Howard.
- Episodes: "Echo Park" – "Westwood"

Called "Joe", Dekker is a new D.D.A. who will work alongside D.D.A. Morales. He and Morales will be splitting the workload, each appearing in roughly half the episodes. In a case where he takes the murder of two children personally, Dekker mentions he has at least 100 convictions out of all the cases he's tried in his career. When Winters' wife is called by the defense to testify in a case where an ex-con murders her cellmate, and it's believed that Casey coerced the woman to say she murdered her children by arson (that being false), Dekker immediately objects to Casey Winters being called, claiming her testimony is not relevant; the judge allowed her testimony. After Hardin glared at Dekker from the back of the courtroom. Dekker said that the people will stipulate that as a result of evidentiary mistakes and prosecutorial misconduct, that Dillon was wrongly convicted and did not kill her children and if not for that conviction she would have never been in prison with her cellmate. The defense accepts it and Casey is excused. One of Dekker's old law school classmates, Sarah Goodwin (Natalie Zea) defends a case where an oil crew worker was murdered by his female boss. In an open restaurant where they both went after school (and Dekker after court cases) Dekker tells her 'they just didn't click' after she asked him why he never asked her for help in their law school classes but asked a male friend of theirs. Dekker assumed she was implying he was being sexist.

It is seen in a picture on a table in his office, that Dekker has a daughter. When Detective Morales gets involved with an officer involved shooting and the defense attorney wants to use his psychological evaluation as testimony in open court, he tries to get the defense motion thrown out by claiming doctor-patient privilege, although later Morales wants it declared in open court.

In the SVU episode "Reparations", Dekker is in New York, temporarily stepping down from his position as Los Angeles D.D.A., to defend a cousin who has been accused of rape. He finds himself at odds with SVU's returning Assistant District Attorney prosecutor Casey Novak, whom he ridicules for previously being censured. In this episode, it is revealed that Dekker's aunt was raped by the victim's grandfather.

Dekker will often disagree with the views of D.A. Jerry Hardin and in fact challenge them. He once called him to the stand to respond to his decision to apply the 3rd strike against a suspect, which Dekker felt Hardin had done in an attempt to correct a prior mistake. Dekker also feels that one day he will become D.A.

==== Connie Rubirosa ====
- Portrayed by Alana de la Garza
- Episodes: "Silver Lake" – "Angel's Knoll"

Rubirosa had transferred from the Manhattan District Attorney's office in New York (Law & Order) to the Los Angeles District Attorney's office to help out her sick mother.

Just as in NY, she continues to help the defendant if she feels they are not receiving a fair trial. In one trial against a mentally ill man, she talks to the defendant's sister, advising her to seek a different plea in order for her brother to receive proper care; once D.D.A Decker finds out, he is upset with her and mentions that he had dinner with Executive Assistant District Attorney Michael Cutter when he was in NY, saying that Cutter had told him she had "pulled this sort of thing before" and that she is mistaken if she thinks LA would be more laid back than NY.

She often mentions her work back in NY. Her great deal of respect for Jack McCoy is still shown when she mentions that her old boss would still go for principle over money.

=== Former main characters ===
==== Rex Winters ====
- Portrayed by Skeet Ulrich.
- Episodes: (SVU: "Behave") "Hollywood" – "Zuma Canyon", "Plummer Park" – "Westwood"

LAPD Detective Rex Winters is first introduced in the Law & Order: Special Victims Unit episode "Behave", where Detective Olivia Benson (Mariska Hargitay) is traveling from city to city where a rape victim named Vicki Sayers (Jennifer Love Hewitt) traveled and reported being raped. Benson travels to Los Angeles and meets Winters, who was having the DNA tested (which was degraded), and a search warrant ready to search Benson's suspect's storage locker in the city where the suspect had pictures and videos of all his victims. Winters hands off the case to Benson telling her that the statute of limitations on her rape in LA had run out three weeks earlier. He helped her though, because he knew it had not in New York.

A former Marine, Winters was born in 1970. He had the intuition of a natural cop. When he was in the police academy, Winters witnessed the failure of the police in the Rodney King incident. As a young patrolman only six weeks out of the academy, he was on the street during the ensuing riots. It made him take his role as a cop more seriously and rely on himself more than his colleagues. He's married to his former partner with whom he was having an affair while he was married to his previous wife. Her prior involvement in the police force will lead to some complications. They have two kids and crimes where children are involved disturb Winters and make him think of his own family. Growing up Winters is said to have done a lot of surfing. Rex and his grandfather used to fish in the Ballona Creek when he was young, the surrounding area of Ballona Creek was also Winters's first beat. Winters and DDA Stanton were on bad terms as Stanton told him and Jaruszalski that they couldn't talk to a kid who was about to confess to murder without his attorney and his parents present. His father had a drinking problem. His family never discussed politics, religion or his father's drinking when he was young.

In "Zuma Canyon", Rex Winters was killed in the line of duty while sitting down to dinner with his family when bullets from an automatic weapon came in through their living room window, one hitting Winters in the side. Winters was killed by a Mexican drug cartel whose leader, Cesar Vargas, wound up getting off after having the witness – an eleven-year-old boy – killed.

==== Evelyn Price ====
- Portrayed by Regina Hall.
- Episodes: "Hollywood" – "Zuma Canyon"

Evelyn Price is Morales's second chair, an African American who grew up in the upper-middle-class L.A. area of Baldwin Hills. Her father's furniture store was burned down in the King riots. Though she has a healthy skepticism of the LAPD's treatment of minorities, she believes that the anarchy she saw during the L.A. riots was worse than anything that the LAPD has done or might do. She's right of center on law and order issues compared to Morales. Price does not like where men often have lie or come up with an excuse to get what they want, or keep relationships with other women hidden from their spouses; most stems from Price having bad relationships with men herself. Morales tells her she's young and she doesn't understand that what men fear most is being alone.

==== Lauren Stanton ====
- Portrayed by Megan Boone.
- Episodes: "Echo Park" – "Playa Vista"

Stanton is Dekker's second chair, a young center-right prosecutor from San Marino. She says that family court turned her into a tough prosecutor when a judge wanted to see her break down in open court; she held herself together through the proceedings and later broke down alone in a stairwell. Stanton appears to be right of center on law and order issues with justice for victims. Stanton also doesn't take too kindly to television attorneys (like Dekker's law school classmate Sarah Goodwin (Natalie Zea)) who think they know more than a regular attorney. Stanton does not consider herself a "cookie-cutter feminist" who searches for fault in men. She gets on bad ground with Dekker and Detective Winters in "Playa Vista" when the child of a pro-golfer named Luke Jarrow (Hutch Dano) murdered his father's mistress for his mother (Bellamy Young). Stanton tells Luke not to talk to Winters and Jaruszalski because he was about to confess to the murder without his parents or an attorney present because he is under age. She told the detectives that she didn't even care if Luke was a gang banger from Crenshaw, much less the son of a famous pro-golfer. She left her position in the DA's office because her boyfriend took a job in Washington, D.C. and she moved with him. TJ was attracted to her and regretted not acting on his feelings when he had the chance.

== Recurring characters ==
=== Los Angeles County District Attorney Jerry Hardin ===
- Portrayed by Peter Coyote.
- Episodes: "Echo Park" – "Van Nuys"

He was the Los Angeles County District Attorney and oversaw the Deputy District Attorneys. He was a Democrat. He was elected as the DA prior to 2004. He appears to know much about politics and scandals concerning the DA's office and the L.A.P.D. and he does whatever he can to ensure the sanctity of the office unlike his predecessor who let a judge and a prosecutor have an affair during the murder trial of a woman who presumably killed her children. In a case where two innocent children are killed in an accidental meth lab explosion and the Department of Defense comes in to take custody of the defendants after their terrorist cell plot was revealed to bomb the L.A.X.; Dekker persuades Hardin to "hedge his bets" to keep the case tried in Los Angeles and how it would look bad if it appeared the district attorney gave up and politically letting two children get murdered without justice.

=== Casey Ryan-Winters ===
- Portrayed by Teri Polo.
- Episodes: "Echo Park" – "Hayden Tract"

Casey is Detective Rex Winters' wife and former partner, a former hard-nosed cop who retired to start a family. When she was a detective, she was accused of coaching a mother to say she killed her children which led the mother to be wrongly convicted. Winters told Jaruszalski that when he and Casey were partners she liked 'to be the first through the door', that she wanted to be treated like she was one of the guys and not less. Rex tells Jaruzelski in "Playa Vista" that Casey is into professional female golf, and that they one night watched a poker tournament on Bravo. She returns in the episode "Hayden Tract," in which she and her daughter must leave their home after TJ's vendetta against Cesar compromises their safety.

=== Coroner Miwako Nishizawa ===
- Portrayed by Tamlyn Tomita.
- Episodes: "Hondo Field" – "Carthay Circle".

Miwako Nishizawa is the coroner for the Robbery-Homicide Division of the Los Angeles Police Department. She was introduced in the episode "Hondo Field," where an illegal immigrant who works on an oil rig five miles off the coast is sexually harassed by his female boss.

== See also ==
- List of Law & Order characters
