= Ricardo Morales (Law & Order: LA) =

Det. Ricardo Morales
- Law & Order character
- Ricardo Morales portrayed by Alfred Molina in the episode "Silver Lake".
- First appearance: "Hollywood"
- Last appearance: "Westwood"
- Portrayed by: Alfred Molina

In-universe information
- Nicknames: Rick; Ricky
- Title: LAPD Detective
- Occupation: Police Officer; Prosecutor
- Family: Karina Morales (daughter)
- Partner: Tomas Jaruszalski

Ricardo "Rick" Morales is a fictional character from the NBC legal drama series Law & Order: LA, portrayed by Alfred Molina. He made his debut appearance in the show's first episode "Hollywood", broadcast on September 29, 2010.

== Casting ==
On July 24, 2010, series creator Dick Wolf announced Molina had joined the cast of Law & Order: LA as Deputy District Attorney Morales.

== Fictional character biography ==
Ricardo Morales is an offspring of a political family. Morales was a "battlefield general" in the courtroom yet "coarsely sardonic and self-deprecating" in real-life. Morales has a deep abiding sense of justice. He inherits his work ethic from his father, a man who took great pride in his work. Like most Los Angeles DAs, Morales has an eye for politics. Morales eventually goes back to his roots as a detective, where he feels he can make more of a difference in apprehending criminals.

=== Early life ===
Morales grew up in Boyle Heights. To raise extra money for college Morales drove a town car around the city, often being shocked at things he saw in his rearview mirror.

=== Early police life ===
In the 1980s, Morales started out as a patrolman with the Los Angeles Police Department until he wound up shooting an armed suspect, which might have played in him becoming a homicide detective. He lost at least two partners; one to cancer, the other fell in the line of duty.

He later quit the police department figuring "he might make a real difference" as a prosecutor.

=== As a prosecutor ===
Morales is a sardonic pragmatist who thinks moral rectitude is lovely but ineffective in a street fight. Though he knows how to manipulate both his public image and behind-the-scenes politics, he is still competent in the courtroom.

It is seen that Morales has gone head-to-head with most judges and criminal defense attorneys, and at some point on a personal level.

He approved of same-sex marriage.

In "Zuma Canyon", Morales gets personally involved when an eleven-year-old Mexican child named Fernando (Quinton Lopez) is found guarding a marijuana crop with a loaded gun, after being kidnapped from his family in Mexico by a drug lord named Caesar Vargas (Jose Pablo Cantillo) who was responsible for slaughtering members of a Mexican family at a quinceañera and then later killing Detective Rex Winters (Skeet Ulrich) at his home. Fernando offered to testify in court against Vargas if his family could be brought to America, but when that time came he was murdered by a woman posing as court briefer - who was likely hired by Vargas.

Morales quits being a deputy district attorney and returns to the LAPD as a detective, after being frustrated with the justice system and the prosecutorial politics involved in trying to convict Vargas, who in turn got away with kidnapping charges along with multiple counts of murder and manslaughter charges.

=== Return as a detective ===
Morales coming back – grateful Lt. Gonzales pulled the strings to get him into Robbery-Homicide – on the job almost set a guilty rapist free with a coerced confession; although DDA Dekker managed to get the perpetrator to plead out to two counts of murder with no parole when it's discovered he was sending one of the victims – Don Alvin (Tim DeKay), a man he bound and gagged in his bathroom – messages from his cell. With that victory Morales asked Alvin out for a drink in which Alvin told him to go home to his family, leaving Morales pondering.

In "East Pasadena"; skeletons are brought out of the closet when Morales shoots an armed suspect, which brings out he was involved in an officer involved shooting before in his police career as a detective, which might have played in him becoming a detective. He was evaluated by the police shrink, who told him he could return to duty.

Tensions rise between Morales and Dekker in "Benedict Canyon" when it's discovered in open court that Morales and one of his old partners, Terry Briggs (Jeff Fahey) met in a bar and had drinks for over four hours, running a high tab - Briggs killing a successful Hollywood stylist, hired by the stylist's sister; which later Morales figured out. Briggs was murdered in prison, awaiting the resumption of the trial. Later over drinks, Dekker and Morales are back on solid ground; after Morales jokingly accepts an apology from Dekker.

==== Partnership with T.J. Jaruszalski ====
Morales is portrayed as "coarsely sardonic and self-deprecating" while being very wise and politically and media savvy while his partner T.J. Jaruszalski, is portrayed as practical and being a Hollywood native, knows the ins and outs. There is often a bit of tension between Morales and Jaruszalski, but it later resolves.

After being involved in an officer involved shooting, the defense later wanting what was said in Morales's psych evaluation admitted into open court. In the session he talked about Winters's murder and the effect it had on his partner, Jaruszalski - Morales leaving him with the permission to admit his psych evaluation in court, which Jaruszalski does. At the end of the episode, Jaruszalski asks him what would have happened if he had told Morales not to admit his evaluation into open court; Morales says he didn't consider that Jaruszalski would object to it.

=== Family ===
Morales's parents are Latino immigrants, his father was a groundskeeper at the Hillcrest Country Club. He mentions having brothers, where on vacations his father would load them up in a van and take them to the beach. His father was still alive in 2010.

Morales mentions to Fernado Ramirez, an eleven-year-old boy set to testify against a murderous Mexican drug dealer, that he had a daughter named Karina who doesn't live with him.

== Reception ==
Joel Rubin of the Los Angeles Times said, "Molina as a detective is compelling."

Hillary Busis of Entertainment Weekly had to say, "At the very least, Molina's switch from the courtroom to the precinct — however implausible it might be — seems like a good move for the show. While Morales isn't as fun as, say, Lennie Briscoe, he does have more gravitas and presence than Winters did. It will also be interesting to watch his principles get tested in the field, and to see how his lawyer brain affects his policing."
