= Zuma Canyon =

- Law & Order: LA episode
- Skeet Ulrich (Rex Winters) after being shot, Teri Polo (Casey Winters) attempting CPR. Caitlin Carmichael (Lily Winters) holding his hand.
- Episode no.: Season 1 Episode 9
- Directed by: Tom DiCillo
- Written by: Richard Sweren
- Production code: 01014
- Original air date: April 11, 2011

Guest appearances
- Jose Pablo Cantillo as Caesar Vargas; Charles Rahi Chun as Mitch Pellington; Quinton Lopez as Fernando; Caitlin Carmichael as Lily Winters; Al Espinosa as Deputy Ortega; Ray Santiago as Ray Mota; Rosa Salazar as Yolanda; Teri Polo as Casey Ryan-Winters; Peter Coyote as District Attorney Jerry Hardin

Episode chronology
| ← Previous "Playa Vista" | Next → "Silver Lake" |

"Zuma Canyon" is the ninth episode of the revamped and renamed Law & Order spinoff, Law & Order: LA. The episode originally aired on April 11, 2011 on NBC. In this episode, the police investigate a quinceañera massacre; one of them may pay the ultimate price, and a district attorney is set to take the law back into his own hands.

== Plot ==
When a normal quinceañera erupts in violence when several men masked in bandanas open fire on the party leaving multiple people dead, Detectives Winters and Jaruszalski quickly follow leads. During their search for answers, they find an eleven-year-old Yaqui Indian boy from Sonora, Mexico named Fernando (Quinton Lopez) protecting acres of marijuana in Zuma Canyon, and discover he is the only witness that can help the case, although he does not talk and tell them who he is because he fears the man with "snakes feet" – Caesar Vargas (Jose Pablo Cantillo), who owned the marijuana field.

The police place him in Eastlake Juvenile Facility, under a pseudonym for his own protection. As the detectives begin to close in on the suspect, Winters receives a surprise visit at home where a car slows down in front of his house, just before a gunman opens fire, Winters getting shot in the side protecting his daughter Lily (Caitlin Carmichael). While Casey (Teri Polo) performs CPR, their telephone rings; Cesar's filtered voice leaves an ominous message on the answering machine – Winters dies in the hospital, causing everyone to grieve, even various police officers and members of the district attorney's office that were in the waiting area.

Meanwhile, DDA Morales risks upsetting the Mexican government by prosecuting the guilty. Morales calls Deputy Ortega (Al Espinosa) of the Mexican consulate corrupt and accuses him of knowing Vargas and leaking information about Fernando's location to Cesar Vargas, which Ortega denies, although to keep the police off him he told Morales that Caesar was seeking refuge and asking to be repatriated. Morales later takes heat from D.A. Jerry Hardin (Peter Coyote), who initially insisted on waiting until Vargas was back in Mexico to formally extradite him.

Hardin secretly had the deputy assistant attorney general of Mexico listening in on the telephone to get Mexican Consul General Efraim Contreras and Ortega to deal to bluff Vargas into thinking he was going to Mexico. Instead, Jaruszalski pulls Cesar out of the back seat of an SUV and arrests him. Later, Morales promised to move Fernando's family to Los Angeles, in exchange for Fernando's testimony; but Bo Washburn; a representative from the State Department, declined his request. Morales ambushes him with an emergency petition to compel the State Department to grant asylum to Fernando's family in federal court.

Morales appeals to the judge, and eventually Fernando is reunited with his family. Before trial is set to start and Fernando is set to be called to the witness stand, he is found in a pool of blood, his throat cut – a woman posed as the interpreter assigned to Fernando committed the crime, likely hired by Vargas. With Fernando dead, Morales's case got thrown out and Caesar Vargas walked – the courtroom shocked.

Morales wonders how it will look for the DA's office if he quits and returns to the police force, because his boss is too vain to ask for help in bringing a cop killer to justice. Though Hardin turned the tables, spinning Morales' move as a resignation after being replaced as the prosecutor in Vargas' case, Hardin will say the case needed a fresh pair of eyes, and even if it took 10 years, they would prosecute Vargas.

Later on, Morales walks in with a box of his belongings; wearing an LAPD badge, he sets them down on an empty desk while Jaruszalski is watching by a window.

== Production ==
The episode was written by Richard Sweren and directed by Tom DiCillo. Stars Skeet Ulrich, Regina Hall and Megan Boone had to depart the cast due to a casting overhaul in January 2011, which in turn Skeet Ulrich was replaced by Alfred Molina whose role changed from lead prosecutor to lead detective in the next episode.

== Notes ==
- This was originally intended to be the fourteenth episode of the season.
- This episode features a new opening narration by Steven Zirnkilton instead of using the original Law & Order opening narration which was used starting with the third episode ("Harbor City").
- The series title changed to just: Law & Order: LA, coinciding with the changes and creative overhaul.

== Reception ==
In its original American broadcast on April 11, 2011; "Zuma Canyon" was approximately viewed by an estimated 6.10 million households with a 1.5 rating/4% share in the 18–49 demographic in the two-hour range of episodes.
