= Behave (Law & Order: Special Victims Unit) =

- Law & Order: Special Victims Unit episode
- Detective Benson (Mariska Hargitay) present as Vicki Sayers (Jennifer Love Hewitt) identifies her attacker in a line-up
- Episode no.: Season 12; Episode 3
- Directed by: Helen Shaver
- Written by: Jonathan Greene
- Production code: 12003
- Original air date: September 29, 2010

Guest appearances
- Jennifer Love Hewitt as Julie McManus / Vicki Alicia Sayers; James Le Gros as William "Bill" Harris; Jennifer Barnhart as Chicago PD Detective Lorna Diamond; Peter Hermann as Defense Attorney Trevor Langan; Francie Swift as ADA Sherri West; Judith Light as Judge Elizabeth Donnelly; Skeet Ulrich as Detective Rex Winters

Episode chronology
← Previous "Bullseye"	Next → "Merchandise"
- Law & Order: Special Victims Unit season 12

"Behave" is the third episode of the twelfth season of the police procedural Law & Order: Special Victims Unit and the 251st episode overall. It originally aired on NBC in the United States on September 29, 2010. The episode, which was inspired by rape kit backlogs, follows Detective Olivia Benson (Mariska Hargitay) helping a repeat rape victim (Jennifer Love Hewitt) stand up to her attacker, and finding the evidence to put him away. Meanwhile, the rapist (James Le Gros) could possibly walk because the evidence against him has been misplaced, poorly stored and even accidentally destroyed.

The episode was written by long-time Law & Order: SVU writer, Jonathan Greene and was directed by Helen Shaver. It was inspired by the backlog of rape kits across the United States and the story of California rape victim, Helena Lazaro, whose evidence went unprocessed for years. Skeet Ulrich made a special guest appearance in this episode as his Law & Order: LA character, Detective Rex Winters, who was on Vicki's rape case when she lived in Los Angeles. Law & Order: LA originally premiered on NBC directly after this episode.

"Behave" was given generally positive reviews from critics, especially Hewitt's portrayal of Vicki Sayers, and according to the Nielsen ratings from TV by the Numbers, the episode's original broadcast was watched by 9.47 million total viewers and received a 2.8 rating / 8% share in the 18–49 age demographic, making it the second most watched program on NBC of the night, under the premiere episode of Law & Order: LA.

== Plot ==
Detectives Olivia Benson (Mariska Hargitay) and Elliot Stabler (Chris Meloni) are called to the hospital, where the doctor informs them that his patient has been raped and severely beaten. Through tax rolls, Benson and Stabler discover that the victim is Vicki Sayers (Jennifer Love Hewitt) who lives in Washington Heights and almost never goes outside. By staking out her home, Benson ultimately convinces her to submit to a rape kit.

During the exam, Vicki reveals that she has been repeatedly stalked and raped by the same attacker since she was 16. Evidence from the rape kit leads the detectives to a hotel where they find a man matching Vicki's description. Vicki quickly identifies the man, William Harris (James LeGros), out of a line-up; but he provides a strong alibi prompting the detectives to have to release him. Outraged and petrified her rapist is being released, whilst he's proceeding to the elevator, Vicki runs up to him and begs him not to retaliate/hurt her again. Convinced by Vicki's desperation, Benson spends the night working on the case and finds a hole in Harris' alibi.

By examining Harris' travel records, Benson and Stabler discover that he has committed dozens of rapes over several years. Benson begins to make calls from state to state in search of the rape kits from his previous victims, only to discover incompetence or backlogs numbering in the thousands each time, thwarting her efforts. The first rape kit that she might be able to use is found in Los Angeles, where she meets with LAPD Robbery-Homicide Detective Rex Winters (Skeet Ulrich). Winters tells her that the medical examiner has found, though a degraded sample, still enough alleles to testify that the DNA is a match for Harris. Harris' lawyer Trevor Langan (Peter Hermann) successfully argues that the DNA in the 10-year-old rape kit has been degraded beyond reliability and Judge Donnelly (Judith Light) is forced to dismiss the people's case.

Despite being unable to prosecute Harris for rape, the exasperated detectives search for an alternative means and find strong evidence that allows him to be prosecuted for kidnapping charges (from Vicki's initial abduction/rape). Finally feeling trapped, Harris changes tack and begs Vicki not to do this, professing his actions were out of love for her. Vicki confronts him as he's locked in a cell and taunts him with his own words: "Now I'll always know where you are! Be a good boy. Behave yourself!"

== Production ==
"Behave" was written by Jonathan Greene and directed by Helen Shaver. Mariska Hargitay filmed a portion of this episode, late August 2010 in Los Angeles with Law & Order: LA star, Skeet Ulrich. Hargitay was attending the Primetime Emmy Awards, in which she was nominated for Outstanding Lead Actress in a Drama Series. This episode was the first time Law & Order: SVU had shot an episode on the West Coast. "Behave" is inspired by rape survivor and victims advocate Helena Lazaro, who spoke at a fundraiser for Hargitay's Joyful Heart Foundation; several years earlier, she submitted to an exam for a rape evidence collection kit that was ignored by police. "I'm so honored that the SVU writers see the value in telling this story," says Hargitay. "And it's very cool how they're weaving our two shows together." Neal Baer, the series' show runner/executive producer at the time, said after he heard the Lazaro's testimony, "One of the stories was about how they weren't opening the kits. This guy was out there and he would have been stopped years before. I leaned over and whispered to one of our writers and said, 'This is it,'" he recalled.

"One of the most rewarding aspects of working on SVU is the show's ability to shine a light on the problem of sexual violence. This next episode is one of the most meaningful I have ever done, and it stands as a powerful example of the way we aim to raise awareness about these difficult issues...Recently, I heard from a rape victim whose kit was tested 13 years after she was raped. Thirteen years. The DNA in her kit matched the profile of a convicted rapist already in prison. Learning the identity of her rapists, and that he was in a place where he could not hurt her, gave this woman a sense of peace for the first time since she was raped. It is for this woman and all the others like her that I am committed to doing my part to end the rape kit backlog. I hope you will join us in this cause. Together, we can end the backlog and bring justice to survivors."

— Mariska Hargitay

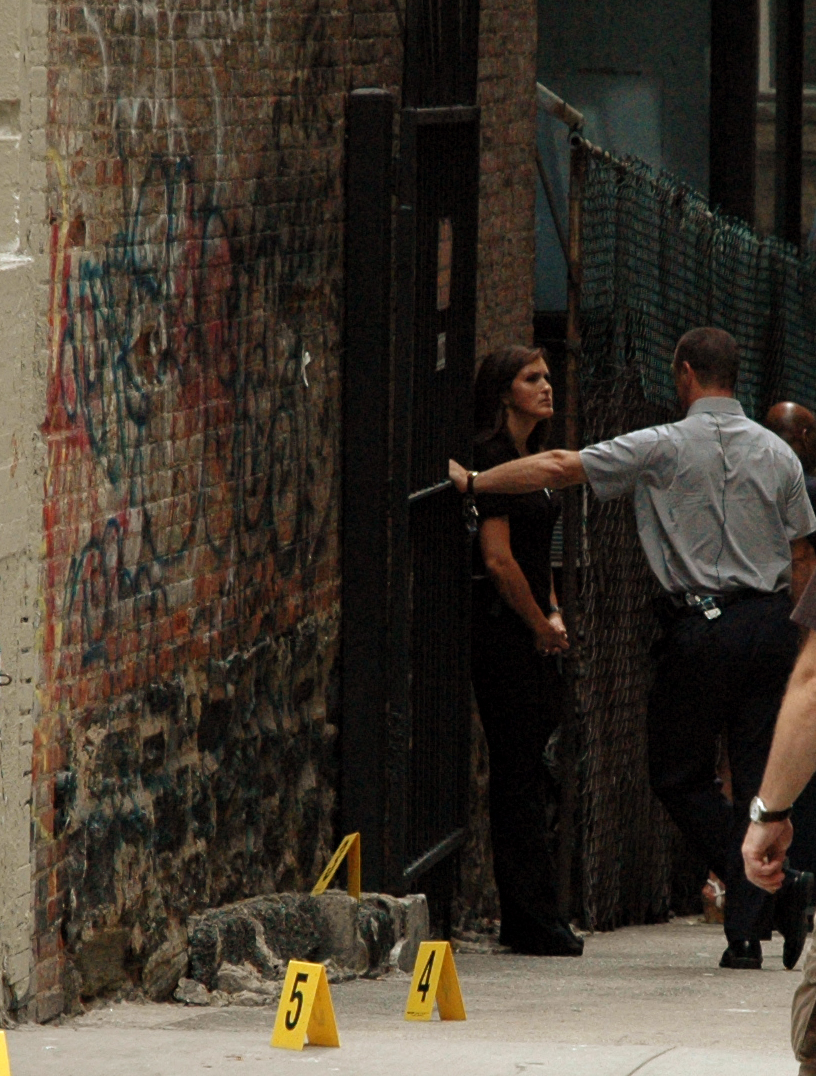
Mariska Hargitay and Christopher Meloni filming on West 111th Street in Manhattan for the episode on August 10, 2010

When Jennifer Love Hewitt, who portrayed Vicki Sayers, was cast in the episode, Baer told TV Guide, "One of the reasons we wanted to do this episode is because it addresses Mariska Hargitay's passion for rape kits, which can help gather evidence to convict the rapists. But for some reason these kits have been sitting around unopened in cities all over the country." Jennifer Love Hewitt noted the role was like nothing she has done before: raw and stripped-down. "Looks-wise, wardrobe-wise, hair-wise, makeup-wise ... [I had to] take everything off and be something that I've never been before. [It] really allowed me emotionally and physically and mentally to go to a different place," she said. Hewitt hopes that her portrayal bolsters the message by putting a face to it. "It's showing you what this issue can do to someone, and it's hopefully making [people] feel it... it's a gift that we get to be able to tell those stories. And it's a duty to tell them."

A day prior to the episode airing, Baer and Hargitay wrote an article for The Huffington Post; the article states that hundreds of thousands of rape kits across the country are not tested because of budget constraints. Baer and Hargitay write, "By failing to test these rape kits, we are telling victims that pursuing justice doesn't matter, that convicting violent perpetrators and taking them off our streets is not a top priority." They also point out that the city of New York eliminated their backlog in 2003 and the city's arrest rate for rape jumped from 40 to 70 percent.

Hargitay and Baer note what Lazaro had to say when her rape kit was tested after 13 years and her rapist was finally identified: "Finally, my nightmares have stopped almost altogether. I have a sense of security that I haven't felt in over a decade. My home is my own. My family is safe." Baer and Hargitay add that, "'Behave,' shows the dire consequences of the rape kit backlog. We hope it will move you to action. To learn more about how you can help, go to a new web-site launching on September 29, endthebacklog.org. Together we can end the rape kit backlog and bring justice to victims."

== Reception ==
=== Ratings ===
In its original American broadcast on September 29, 2010, "Behave" was viewed by an estimated 9.47 million households with a 2.8 rating / 8% share in the age 18–49 demographic. "Behave" was the lead in to the premiere episode of Law & Order: LA which was viewed by an estimated 10.63 million households with a 3.2 rating / 10% share in the key demographic. SVU that night was beat out by a new episode of: Criminal Minds on CBS which was viewed by an estimated 14.56 million households with a 3.6 rating / 10% share and in the first half-hour, by the ABC comedy, Modern Family, which was viewed by an estimated 11.91 million homes and had a 4.6 rating / 13% share. In the last half-hour, SVU beat the ABC comedy, Cougar Town which was only viewed by 6.96 million homes, but it tied with SVU in the 18-49 age demographic. LOLA was the top rated program on NBC that night.

=== Critical response ===
Sadie Stein of Jezebel.com noted on the episode, "As we've discussed before, unprocessed rape kits are a major issue and an ongoing source of frustration to all those who know how invaluable they are in catching rapists. But in case you weren't aware of the issue, this episode, "Behave," aimed to educate you. And while drama, dialogue and plausibility may have suffered somewhat in the process, by gum, the issue was addressed!"

Clarissa at TV Overmind gave the episode a very positive review, particularly regarding Jennifer Love Hewitt's performance: "Her pain and fear is palpable through every moment of this scene. I wanted to scream and cry in the scene where she begs her rapist to forgive her for getting the police involved because she's afraid for her life. In other words, Jennifer Love Hewitt knocked this one out of the park." She adds, "It's episodes like this that remind me why I've watched SVU for a number of years."
