= Hollywood (Law & Order: LA) =

- Law & Order: LA episode
- Skeet Ulrich (left) and guest star Danielle Panabaker (right) in an elevator as the episode ends.
- Episode no.: Season 1 Episode 1
- Directed by: Allen Coulter
- Story by: Dick Wolf
- Teleplay by: Blake Masters
- Production code: 01001
- Original air date: September 29, 2010

Guest appearances
- Shawnee Smith as Trudy Sennett; Oded Fehr as Nick Manto; Michael O'Neill as Jeb Monroe; John Patrick Amedori as K.K. Curren; Jim Beaver as Frank Loomis; Mira Furlan as Maria Olsen; Wyatt Russell as Sam Loomis; Leah Pipes as Miranda Clark; Travis Van Winkle as Colin Blakely; Jim Piddock as Jay Bickson; Gareth Williams as Jim Bikel; Megan Ferguson as Toni Parre; Danielle Panabaker as Chelsea Sennett

Episode chronology
← Previous —	Next → "Echo Park"

"Hollywood" is the first episode of the fifth Law & Order series, Law & Order: LA. The episode originally aired on September 29, 2010 on NBC. In the premiere episode, when the activities of a young bling ring of thieves strays to assault and murder, Los Angeles' finest are called in to unravel the case.

== Plot ==
A group of thieves target the homes of young Hollywood stars, Detectives Rex Winters and Tomas Jaruszalski track the activities of the burglary ring that target the rich and famous, whose latest job escalated from simple burglary to assault. After the perpetrators are uncovered, another shocking crime is committed at the home of young starlet Chelsea Sennett (Danielle Panabaker) and her stage mom, Trudy Sennett (Shawnee Smith) where one of the suspects ends up murdered (Wyatt Russell) during the next heist. As everyone starts turning on each other, Deputy District Attorney Morales remains intent on exposing the real ringleader.

== Production ==
The episode was written by Blake Masters and Dick Wolf and directed by Allen Coulter. This episode was based on The Bling Ring Burglars, a group of out-of-control teenagers and young adults accused of targeting homes of actors like Paris Hilton and Orlando Bloom. Wanda De Jesus only portrayed the character Lt. Arleen Gonzales in the premiere episode after leaving the cast in August 2010. In subsequent episodes the character is portrayed by Rachel Ticotin who had to re-shoot some of De Jesus' scenes. The lead detective, Rex Winters (Skeet Ulrich) was introduced in a Law & Order: Special Victims Unit episode, "Behave" which originally aired directly before the Law & Order: LA premiere. The episode focused on an investigation involving a rape kit, which takes Detective Olivia Benson (Mariska Hargitay) from New York City to Los Angeles.

== Notes ==
- California Penal Code "3-1-4" is for a naked person or for indecent exposure.
- This episode and the succeeding episode ("Echo Park") did not feature an opening narration by Steven Zirnkilton as the other Law & Order series do. The original Law & Order opening narration was used by the third episode ("Harbor City").

== Reception ==
In its original American broadcast on September 29, 2010, "Hollywood" was viewed by an estimated 10.64 million households with a 3.2 rating/10% share in the 18-49 demographic.
