= Law & Order: Special Victims Unit season 12 =

Season of American television series

Law & Order: Special Victims Unit
- Season 12
- Season 12 U.S. DVD cover
- Starring: Christopher Meloni; Mariska Hargitay; Richard Belzer; Ice-T; BD Wong; Tamara Tunie; Dann Florek
- No. of episodes: 24

Release
- Original network: NBC
- Original release: September 22, 2010 – May 18, 2011

Season chronology
- ← Previous; Season 11 Next → Season 13

The twelfth season of Law & Order: Special Victims Unit premiered in the United States on NBC on September 22, 2010, and concluded on May 18, 2011. This was the first season that the show did not air alongside the original Law & Order. Episodes initially aired on Wednesdays between 9pm/8c and 10pm/9c Eastern, except for the season premiere, which aired from 9pm/8c to 11pm/10c. After the winter hiatus, SVU returned with another two-hour showing on January 5, 2011, before the broadcast time switched to the 10pm/9c time slot the following week.

At the end of the season, Neal Baer resigned his position as showrunner. After the season finale, Christopher Meloni, BD Wong, and Tamara Tunie left the principal cast.

== Production ==
For the first eleven years of Law & Order: SVU, the set had been located in New Jersey, at NBC's Central Archives building in North Bergen. Faced with losing the state's 20 percent tax incentive, the show moved to New York City into the studio space at Chelsea Piers that was occupied by the original Law & Order series. After the fourth episode of the season, the original New Jersey set was no longer used. Outdoor filming was halted on January 26, 2011, due to a blizzard. Production resumed in the Chelsea Piers studio.

This season's third episode focused on an investigation involving a rape kit, which took Detective Olivia Benson (Hargitay) from New York City to Los Angeles to meet Los Angeles Police Department (LAPD) Detective Rex Winters (Skeet Ulrich). The episode was shot while Hargitay was in Los Angeles for the Primetime Emmy Awards in August 2010, and aired September 29, before the Law & Order: LA premiere on NBC.

Neal Baer left Law & Order: SVU at the end of the season, after serving eleven years (seasons 2–12) as showrunner. He chose not to renew his NBC contract, instead signing a three–year deal with CBS Studios.

== Cast changes and returning characters ==
Australian newspaper Courier-Mail reported in February 2010 that season twelve would be Christopher Meloni's last, after his comment to the reporter that "I think 12 years is enough, a good number" was misunderstood. Meloni later clarified that, at the time, he had one year left on his contract and the show had not been picked up. He also said "[i]t wasn't [the reporter's] fault", and that he would continue on the show as long as it is picked up. When asked in an interview if she could envision doing the show without him, Mariska Hargitay said, "Oh man, it breaks my heart to even think about it. I just love that man and I love acting with him, and I think it's our chemistry that makes the show what it is. So I don't even want to think about it".

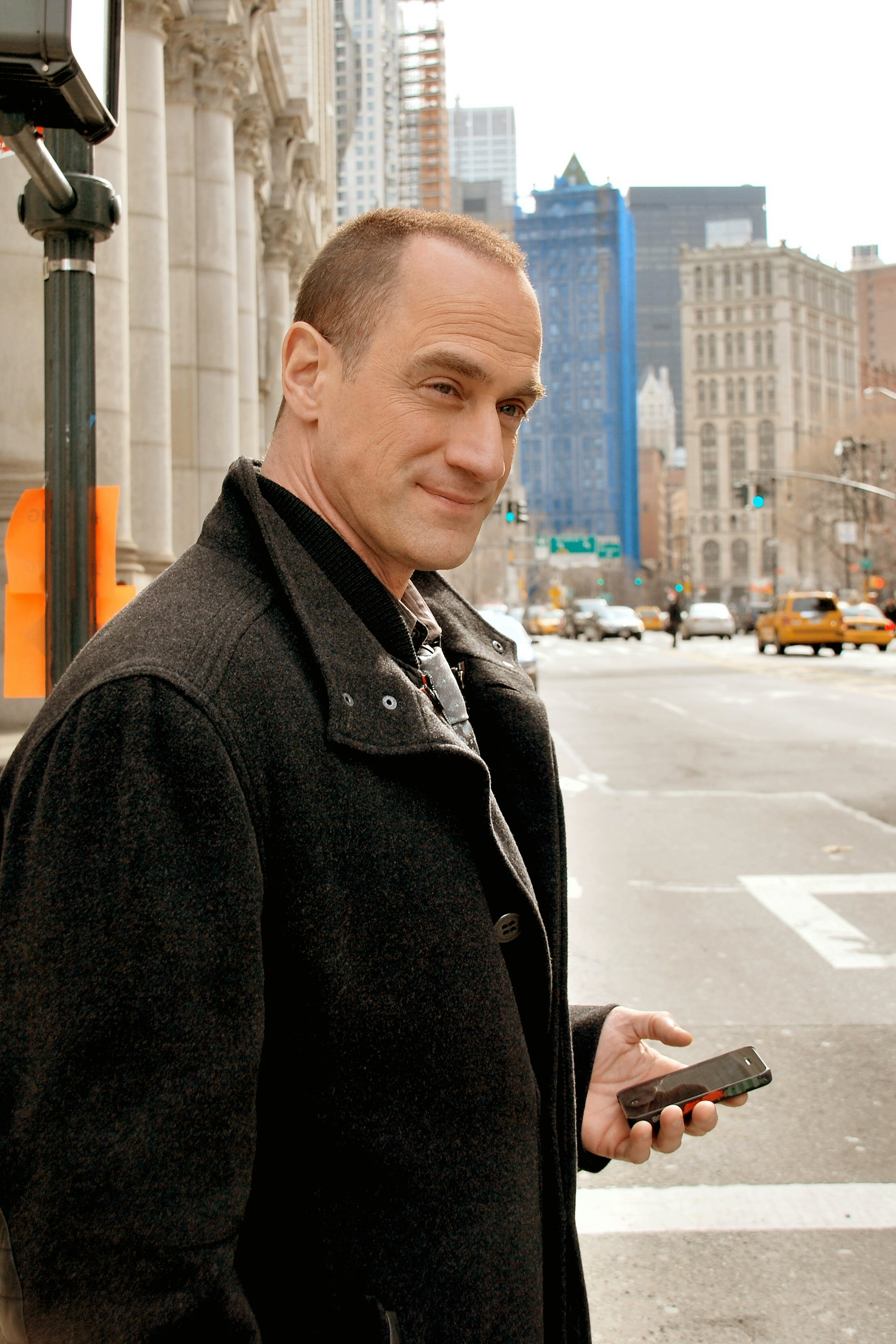
This season marked Meloni's last regular appearance on the show.

On April 12, 2010, NBC officially picked up SVU for a twelfth season with Meloni and Hargitay returning as part of the one-year deal they struck with NBC before production began on season 11, which included an option for a second year. The two started shooting new episodes in June and July 2010. Hargitay expressed interest in her character having a baby this season, saying, "A boyfriend! A baby! I don't even have to get married. I just want a baby! Give me a baby!".

On June 23, 2010, Michael Ausiello reported that Paula Patton was in "advanced talks" to join the show, as a permanent ADA. TV Guide later confirmed that Patton would play Assistant District Attorney Mikka Von in multiple episodes, beginning with the fifth episode. She was set to fill the ADA slot left vacant by both Stephanie March (Alexandra Cabot) and guest star Sharon Stone (Jo Marlowe). Patton appeared in a single episode, dropping out to film Mission: Impossible – Ghost Protocol. Her role was replaced by Melissa Sagemiller as ADA Gillian Hardwicke. Sagemiller and Mariska Hargitay previously worked together on the SVU season one episode "Russian Love Poem", in which Sagemiller played a victim. "There's something in my past, a personal connection that we have, something that she did for me and a family member who she helped out ... She's not aware of it yet [but] it becomes revealed in the next several episodes", Sagemiller said. ADA Hardwicke's background was never revealed. Her personality, Sagemiller says, is front and center. "She's tough ... she has a heart, she just gets what she wants". Sagemiller also added, "She sticks to the letter of the law, sometimes to a fault, but in the end I think she always does the right thing".

Christine Lahti returned as EADA Sonya Paxton in the ninth episode "Gray". Paxton, previously exposed as an alcoholic in season 11, had apparently conquered her drinking problem. Baer told TVGuide.com, "She has a huge scene where she faces off with Stabler". Her character was later killed in the seventeenth episode. Diane Neal returned as ADA Casey Novak for the episode "Reparations". Neal had previously made her last appearance in the ninth-season finale, in which her character was censured for violating due process in a rape case.

== Cast ==
=== Main ===
- Christopher Meloni as Senior Detective Elliot Stabler
- Mariska Hargitay as Junior Detective Olivia Benson
- Richard Belzer as Sergeant John Munch
- Ice-T as Junior Detective Fin Tutuola
- BD Wong as FBI Special Agent Dr. George Huang
- Tamara Tunie as Medical Examiner Dr. Melinda Warner
- Dann Florek as Captain Donald "Don" Cragen

=== Crossover stars from Law & Order: Los Angeles ===
- Skeet Ulrich as Los Angeles Police Department Senior Robbery-Homicide Division Detective Rex Winters
- Terrence Howard as Los Angeles County Deputy District Attorney Jonah "Joe" Dekker

=== Special guest star ===
- Diane Neal as ADA Casey Novak

=== Recurring ===
- Amir Arison as Dr. Manning
- Maria Bello as Vivian Arliss
- Neal Bledsoe as Crime Scene Unit Forensics Technician Clifton Montgomery
- Michael Boatman as Defense Attorney Dave Seaver
- Caren Browning as Crime Scene Unit Captain Judith Siper
- Robert John Burke as Internal Affairs Bureau Lieutenant Ed Tucker
- James Chen as Crime Scene Unit Forensics Technician Adrian Sung
- Jamie Concepcion as Officer Delgado
- Lindsay Crouse as Judge D. Andrews
- Henry Ian Cusick as Erik Weber
- Kat Foster as Sarah Hoyt
- Joel de la Fuente as Technical Assistance Response Unit Lieutenant Ruben Morales
- Isabel Gillies as Kathy Stabler
- Stephen Gregory as Dr. Kyle Beresford
- Zack Grenier as Judge Miranski
- Joe Grifasi as Defense Attorney Hashi Horowitz
- Jeremy Irons as Dr. Cap Jackson
- Anne James as Dr. Jane Larom
- Christine Lahti as Executive ADA Sonya Paxton
- Austin Lysy as Defense Attorney Russell Hunter
- Joanna Merlin as Judge Lena Petrovsky
- Gloria Reuben as AUSA Christine Danielson
- Melissa Sagemiller as Assistant District Attorney Gillian Hardwicke
- Joseph Sikora as Jason Gambel
- Francie Swift as Assistant District Attorney Sherri West
- Charlie Tahan as Calvin Arliss

=== Guest stars ===
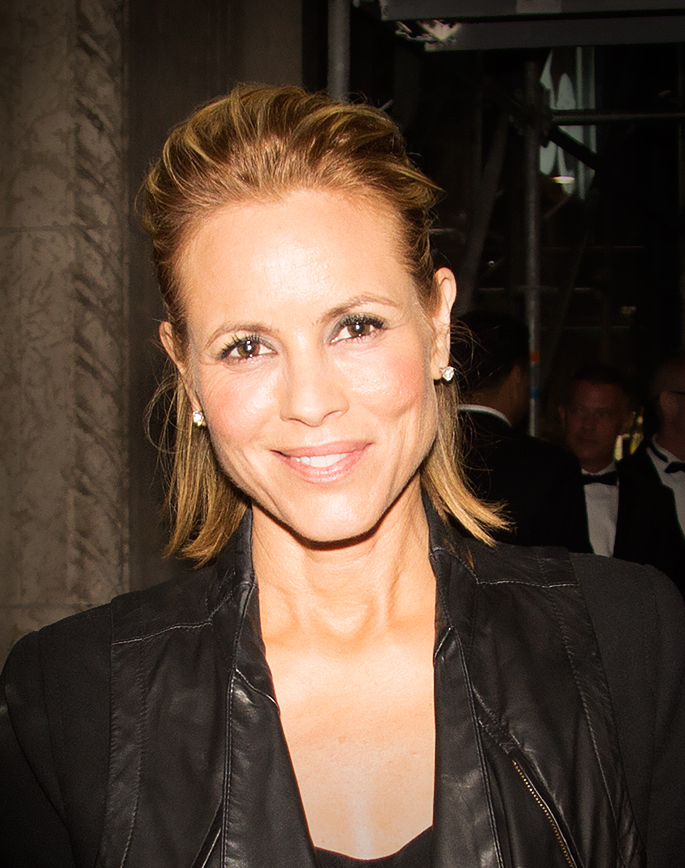
Maria Bello appeared twice in this season as Vivian Arliss, who briefly gives custody of her son to Benson.

Henry Ian Cusick played a graphic artist named Erik Weber in the first two episodes. Joan Cusack played the mother of two missing girls in the first episode. Jennifer Love Hewitt played a rape victim afraid to leave her house in the episode "Behave". Baer told TVGuide.com, "One of the reasons we wanted to do this episode is because it addresses Mariska Hargitay's passion for rape kits, which can help gather evidence to convict the rapists. But for some reason these kits have been sitting around unopened in cities all over the country". Skeet Ulrich guest-starred in the same episode as his Law & Order: LA character, Detective Rex Winters. Gloria Reuben guest starred as US Attorney Christine Danielson in the fourth episode "Merchandise", in which the death of a girl who was struck by a car reveals a child trafficking and slavery ring. Baer said of her appearance, "We're bringing back characters we love this season".

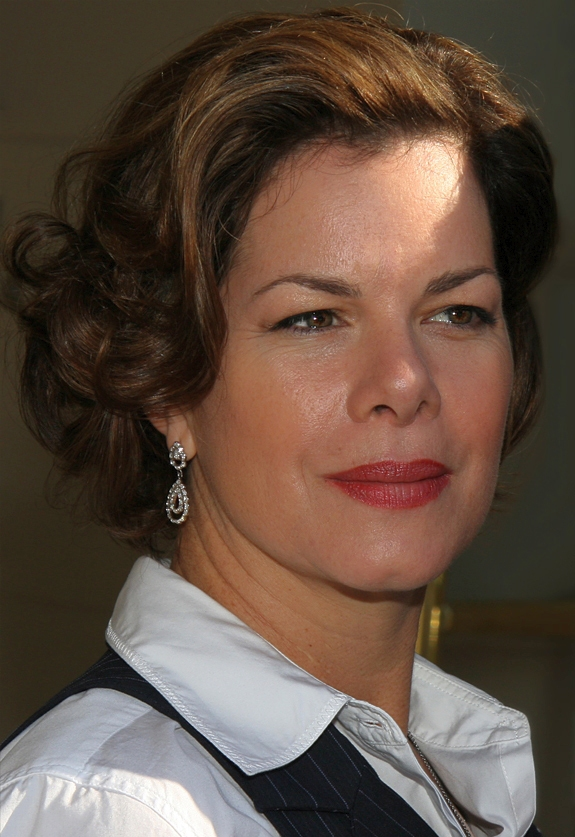
Prior to appearing in season 12, Harden appeared twice in the series, her last appearance being on the season 8 premiere episode "Informed".

David Krumholtz guest starred in the fifth episode "Wet" with actress Rosemary Harris. Krumholtz played an expert on toxic mushrooms who is involved in the same murder investigation that involved Harris' character. Paula Patton, who was originally cast in the role of ADA, also makes a guest appearance as ADA Mikka Von. In the episode, her character is fired because she sent a defense attorney on vacation in order to give the detectives more time in finding who actually committed the murder. In the sixth episode "Branded", Michael Gladis and Kevin Alejandro played two of a trio of rape victims. "They have been branded and sodomized by someone", revealed Baer, who said the show posed the questions, "is there a connection between these men, and what nut case is on the loose?" David Alan Grier played defense attorney Jeremy Swift. Jason Wiles also joined Gladis, Alejandro, and Grier in the episode. Wiles played Alexander Gammon, who becomes a rapist's target.

Maria Bello appeared in the season's seventh episode "Trophy" as Vivian Arliss. After identifying an ex-convict as the prime suspect for the rape and murder of a girl, Benson discovers that Arliss' mother was raped by the same man. Arliss leaves her son Calvin (Charlie Tahan) in Benson's custody to find the boy's father. She later appeared in tenth episode "Rescue". Marcia Gay Harden returned in the season's eighth episode "Penetration" as FBI Agent Dana Lewis. Agent Lewis is raped while undercover, and her rapist has a connection to one of her previous undercover operations in "Raw".

Drea de Matteo guest starred as Sondra in the eleventh episode "Pop", as a pregnant battered wife whose abuser also beats her son from another marriage. Matteo said in an interview that she had not read the script prior to accepting the role and explained that, "I just knew that they wanted me to do something on the show and I'm a fan of the show, I was really excited to be on this show. This is like a New York staple. It's part of our culture here". Olympia Dukakis also guest-starred in that episode as an attorney named Debby Marsh, who is hired to represent the son (Al Calderon) of Sondra. Taryn Manning guest starred in the twelfth episode, "Possessed", portraying a woman who years earlier had been coerced into porn. Peyton List also guest starred as the young version of Taryn Manning's onscreen character, Larissa Welsh. They filmed scenes in December 2010. Jeremy Irons guest starred in "Mask" as Dr. Cap Jackson, a sex therapist who runs a sex addiction rehab clinic. "We're elated to work with an actor of Jeremy's caliber", Baer said. "He brings depth, intelligence and charisma to all his varied roles and we couldn't be luckier to have him guest-star on SVU." A.J. Cook guest starred in the same episode as Irons, and Cook portrayed OBGYN Debbie Shields, the lesbian lover of the daughter of Irons' character. Baer mentioned that "[h]er character is brutally attacked."

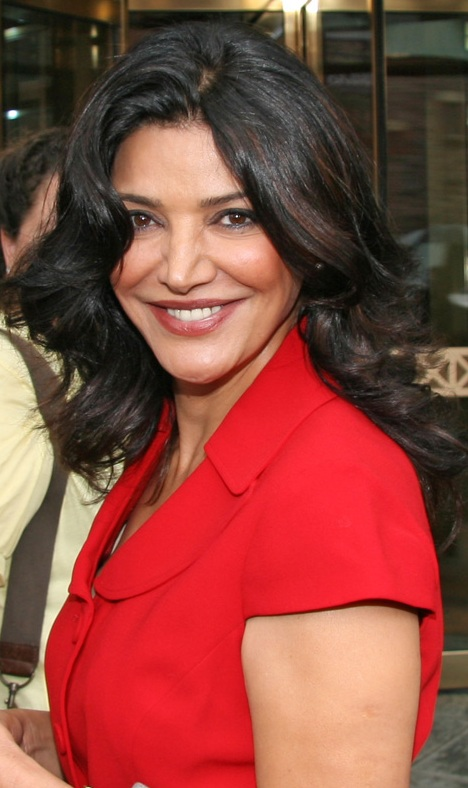
Hargitay met Shohreh Aghdashloo at the 2009 Primetime Emmy Awards and the two "hit it off" so well that Baer invited her to guest star on the show.

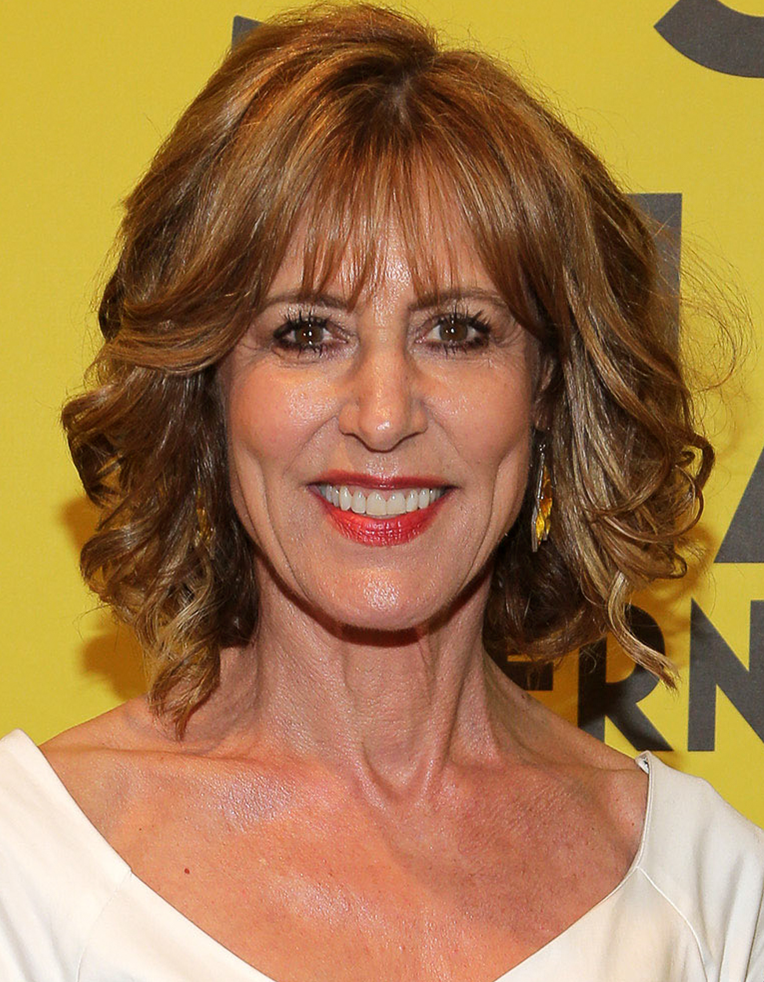
Lahti has appeared multiple times as EADA Sonya Paxton since season 11. Her character was killed in the episode "Pursuit".

Shohreh Aghdashloo guest starred as Detective Saliyah "Sunny" Qadri, an employee of the Brooklyn DA's office in the episode "Dirty". Colm Feore played a wealthy sexual predator named Jordan Hayes in the episode "Flight". Feore said of his character: "Harder is the psychology of a guy who gets his kicks from taking advantage of young women, girls really to be brutally honest. [It's tough] asking yourself what kind of a guy it is who needs to satisfy his desires, such as they are, with innocence". Debra Messing guest starred in the episode, "Pursuit", as a TV journalist who becomes the target of a stalker. Baer described her character as "[a] ballsy television journalist who sets out to nail pedophiles". LuAnn de Lesseps played a socialite who makes a gruesome discovery in the episode, "Bully". Executive producer Dan Truly described her character as a "slightly deranged, out of control artist". For her role, she had to pose semi-nude, for which she said she felt comfortable doing as it was "tasteful". The episode also featured guest appearances from Kate Burton and opera singer Renée Fleming.

Rose McGowan guest starred as another kind of temptress in the episode "Bombshell". Baer said, "Rose plays a grifter named Cassandra who strikes swinging men who frequent sex clubs. And we're very excited to have her." Ryan Hurst also guest starred. Elizabeth Mitchell, signed for a "horrifying" guest role in the episode "Totem". She guest starred alongside returning guest star Jeremy Irons, who appeared earlier in the season as Dr. Cap Jackson. Elizabeth played an unmarried piano teacher who was the last person to see one of her students alive. For the first time, the series dealt with a case in which a woman is suspected of sexually assaulting and murdering a child. Because of the rarity of this offense, Dr. Jackson is called in to consult with Benson and Stabler because he has studied women who have committed this type of crime.

Diane Neal, who portrayed ADA Casey Novak from the fifth season until the end of the ninth season, reprised her role for the episode "Reparations" along with Law & Order: LA actor Terrence Howard, whose character (DDA Joe Dekker) comes to New York to defend his cousin. This episode was the second crossover-episode with Law & Order: LA of the season. Lori Singer played Dede, a mother whose baby is kidnapped in the episode "Bang". John Stamos guest starred in the same episode playing an adoption attorney with a secret passion. Rita Wilson played Bree Mazelon, the protective mother of a teen (Sterling Beaumon) under investigation in the episode, "Delinquent".

== Episodes ==
Law & Order: Special Victims Unit season 12 episodes
No. overall	No. in season	Title	Directed by	Written by	Original release date	Prod. code	U.S. viewers (millions)
249	1	"Locum"	Arthur W. Forney	Dawn DeNoon	September 22, 2010	1201	10.08
Detectives Benson and Stabler investigate the disappearance of the ten-year-old adopted daughter (Bailee Madison) of a foster couple (Joan Cusack and Peter Strauss). They soon discover that she ran away to meet with a man named Erik Weber (Henry Ian Cusick), whom she met on the internet. Benson and Stabler suspect Weber has ulterior motives regarding the girl, but he denies any wrongdoing, which is confirmed, and expresses romantic interest in Benson. As the investigation continues, the detectives realize that the girl's foster parents have another child (Amanda Dillard), which changes the entire course of the case.: Inspired by the Jaycee Dugard case and the film Vertigo.
250	2	"Bullseye"	Peter Leto	Daniel Truly	September 22, 2010	1202	10.08
Benson and Stabler are called to the hospital after a ten-year-old girl (Ruby Jerins) is raped. They arrive to find her so traumatized that she cannot even tell them her name. Detective Tutuola and Sergeant Munch are able to identify the young victim, but they soon realize that her parents (Melissa Rain Anderson and Daniel Stewart Sherman) are far from normal. When the detectives find themselves without a lead, Erik Weber, a man they met on their previous case, decides to get involved and leads them to a convicted child molester (Stephen Tobolowsky) who eventually takes his own life. But shortly afterwards, Benson is able to find out who the real rapist is with the help of one of the victims.
251	3	"Behave"	Helen Shaver	Jonathan Greene	September 29, 2010	1203	9.48
A rape victim (Jennifer Love Hewitt), brought to a hospital, is certain that it is one man (James LeGros) who has repeatedly attacked her, over the past fifteen years. Benson, determined to help, finds this victim's well-founded terror is so great as to make her insist that submitting to a rape kit could only make further repetitions more certain. Looking for means of helping, Benson is horrified to learn how many police precincts and evidence labs across the country hardly ever pursue testing of their rape kits. The investigation leads her to Detroit, Chicago, and finally to Los Angeles.: Special appearance by Skeet Ulrich as Det. Rex Winters.
252	4	"Merchandise"	Peter Leto	Judith McCreary	October 6, 2010	1204	8.69
A fifteen-year-old girl (Michaela Annette) is chased from a farmer's market. When she is hit by a car and killed, Benson and Stabler are surprised when Dr. Warner rules it a homicide, as she found signs that the girl was being starved and had recently given birth. They learn from the girl's father (Paul Schulze) that she and her teenage brother (Devon Gearhart) were kidnapped by an organization that claimed to be hiring farm hands. Tutuola and Dr. Huang arrest one of the conspirators (Amanda Lisa Wong) and find the surviving teenager. Although questioning him proves difficult at first, the boy breaks down upon learning that he got his sister killed, since he was trying to save her from being beaten. With the future of the case uncertain, Benson and Stabler seek assistance from Assistant U.S. Attorney Christine Danielson (Gloria Reuben). Meanwhile, Cragen gets upset over the precinct getting damaged.
253	5	"Wet"	Jonathan Kaplan	Speed Weed	October 13, 2010	1205	8.13
Benson and Stabler arrive on the scene where a woman (Lucy Owen) is found dead in Bethesda Fountain. When her squeaky clean image does not match up with her promiscuous actions, their new ADA, Mikka Von (Paula Patton), encourages the cops to dig deeper into her past. Benson and Stabler find out that the woman worked for a soft drink company that faced recent controversy over trying to privatize water rights in Bolivia. Upon finding out that she was poisoned with toxic mushrooms, the detectives suspect that an activist and professor (David Krumholtz) is responsible. Other suspects present themselves when SVU realizes that his lover (Amanda Fuller) is competing for her wealthy grandmother (Rosemary Harris)'s inheritance and ADA Von's tricks in court cost her more than the case.
254	6	"Branded"	Peter Leto	Chris Brancato	October 20, 2010	1206	8.74
When Benson and Stabler investigate a brutal attack on an unassuming, upstanding father (Michael Gladis), they find him branded on his chest with a wire coat hanger. Before long, another victim turns up (Kevin Alejandro), who has suffered the same injuries. A connection is found when the SVU learns that both men work for the same employer (Jason Wiles). When their assailant (Bess Rous) is captured, her story convinces Benson and new Assistant DA Gillian Hardwicke (Melissa Sagemiller) that she endured far greater suffering. Cameo made by David Alan Grier as the defendant's attorney.
255	7	"Trophy"	Donna Deitch	Ken Storer	November 3, 2010	1207	8.13
After a young woman (Tonya Glanz) is raped and murdered, her body turns up in an industrial laundry facility. When the perp fires at Benson and Stabler from inside a house, they find a torture chamber in the basement and arrest the owner of the house (Joseph Sikora). However, further investigation reveals that he is being set up by a serial rapist (R. Lee Ermey) and Benson builds a connection to a victim's daughter (Maria Bello) and her son (Charlie Tahan).
256	8	"Penetration"	Peter Leto	Christine M. Torres & Dawn DeNoon	November 10, 2010	1208	7.18
FBI Agent Dana Lewis (Marcia Gay Harden) is assaulted by a stranger and asks Benson to have her rape kit tested. Before the police can help her, Lewis goes back undercover and refuses to talk about the assignment or the rape, for fear that she will be exposed and pulled off the case. With Benson and Stabler in pursuit, Lewis apprehends the rapist (Jeremy Davidson) herself. When Hardwicke questions Lewis on the stand, it is revealed that the mercenary was hired by someone (J. C. MacKenzie) who wanted revenge on Lewis.
257	9	"Gray"	Helen Shaver	George Huang	November 17, 2010	1209	7.65
Stabler goes to his daughter Kathleen's (Allison Siko) university to discuss rape prevention at a Take Back the Night rally. When a girl from the crowd (Anna Greenfield) accuses another student (Charlie Barnett) of rape, Stabler and Benson are assigned the case. What emerges are conflicting accounts and fiery accusations without substantial evidence to back them up. Kathleen finds evidence against the student, although Stabler fears that Kathleen will be expelled from school if it is used at trial. Executive ADA Sonya Paxton (Christine Lahti) returns to SVU after her suspension and Stabler convinces her not to compel Kathleen's testimony. Paxton finds another way of prosecuting the student when they learn that he gave an abortive agent to his girlfriend (Gwynneth Bensen) claiming that it was a lubricant.
258	10	"Rescue"	Peter Leto & Constantine Makris	Daniel Truly	December 1, 2010	1210	9.22
With young Calvin Arliss (Charlie Tahan) in her care, Benson claims to be searching for his drug-addict mother Vivian (Maria Bello). However, Stabler begins to question this after noticing the bond forming between Olivia and Calvin. After collaring two paramedics (Mike Starr and James Martinez) for violating an intoxicated partygoer (Shea Glaser) on the way to the hospital, the SVU discovers that Vivian was at an open house attended by the paramedics. Captain Cragen assigns Tutuola and Munch to the case, but Benson gets involved against his orders, leading to heartbreak for Olivia.: Partially inspired by the 2010 Duke University faux sex thesis controversy.
259	11	"Pop"	Norberto Barba	Jonathan Greene	January 5, 2011	1212	10.60
A young boy is found dead on a park carousel after being dropped off by his uncle (James Carpinello). Stabler discovers that he was beaten to death and the mother (Lori Prince) accuses a bully (Sammuel Soifer) at his school. The SVU discovers that the beating did not take place at school, but rather in a park where members of a gambling ring gather to watch teenagers fight. Stabler and Tutuola suspect that one of the ring leaders (Adam Senn) is beating his wife (Drea de Matteo) and son (Al Calderon). When the abusive man is killed by a family member, Hardwicke must decide whom to prosecute for his murder.
260	12	"Possessed"	Constantine Makris	Brian Fagan	January 5, 2011	1213	10.60
A young man (Michelangelo Milano) finds that his girlfriend (Taryn Manning) has been attacked in her apartment with evidence that points to her buried past. Benson and Stabler go in search of her attacker (Devin Ratray) and discover that an elderly author (David Patrick Kelly) used to abuse children. With the statute of limitations coming up, Hardwicke has a hard time prosecuting the man, who acts as his own savvy defense attorney. Detectives reach out to a childhood friend (Brian Justin Crum) of the victim only to find that he never left the world of child pornography.
261	13	"Mask"	Donna Deitch	Speed Weed	January 12, 2011	1215	8.39
A man wearing a haunting mask (Chandler Williams) rapes an OBGYN (A. J. Cook) and assaults her girlfriend (Marguerite Stimpson). In trying to identify the rapist, the SVU discovers that the partner's father Cap Jackson (Jeremy Irons) has a sordid past filled with sex and alcohol addiction. He now works as a sex therapist who refuses to give detectives the names of his patients that they believe could have attacked his daughter. Stabler infiltrates the therapy group without Jackson's knowledge and is able to find the rapist before he attacks another woman.
262	14	"Dirty"	Helen Shaver	Judith McCreary	January 19, 2011	1211	6.97
A Brooklyn detective (Shohreh Aghdashloo) goes in search of one of her legal colleagues (Julie Basem), whom she fears may be in danger. She finds the Assistant District Attorney just in time to witness her fall from the top of a parking garage. When Benson arrives, she discovers that the crime scene has been tampered with and turns to AUSA Danielson (Gloria Reuben) for help. The two of them investigate a member (Doug Drucker) of the Latin Kings and discover evidence that could implicate his girlfriend (Samantha Galarza) as a co-conspirator. Benson uses this as leverage to find out who the killer is and realizes that the suspect has been in her sights the entire time.
263	15	"Flight"	Alex Chapple	Dawn DeNoon & Christine M. Torres	February 2, 2011	1216	8.81
When a teenage girl (Kristina Alexandra Makarian) on a plane shows symptoms of posttraumatic stress disorder due to sexual abuse, all leads point to a wealthy defense contractor (Colm Feore). The billionaire counters that the girl raped him at a party he was throwing and Benson and Stabler find a woman (Kelli Barrett) who appears to seek out young girls for him. Afraid that the squad lacks the evidence to make an arrest, Munch works on making the girl's blog viral, which entices other rape victims to come forward.: Inspired by the case of Jeffrey Epstein and accomplice Ghislaine Maxwell.
264	16	"Spectacle"	Peter Leto	Chris Brancato	February 9, 2011	1214	7.89
After the sexual assault of a young woman (Kellyn Lindsey) is videotaped and featured on a college campus-wide intranet feed, Stabler and Tutuola go in search of the victim and her attacker. As they delve into the investigation, it becomes clear that the perpetrator (Spencer Treat Clark) created a spectacle to draw attention to his own issues and force the police to look for his younger sibling (Dylan Reiff) who was abducted off the streets, in plain sight, five years ago.
265	17	"Pursuit"	Jonathan Kaplan	Judith McCreary	February 16, 2011	1217	7.31
Alicia Harding (Debra Messing), host of the Neighborhood Predator television series, gets a bloody scarf in the mail along with death threats. EADA Paxton informs SVU that she worked with the same woman years ago trying to find her sister's abductor before the case went cold. As the stalker escalates, Harding grows increasingly convinced that the same person killed her sister and tries to draw him into the open by presenting new evidence on her show. Benson, Tutuola, and Paxton accompany Harding to a park where they find several dead bodies, but fear that any public announcement that they have made progress on the case will put her life in danger. The squad is able to find the murderer (Christian Hoff), but only after a member of the team is attacked.
266	18	"Bully"	Helen Shaver	Ken Storer	February 23, 2011	1218	8.02
When an art patron (Luann de Lesseps) discovers a gruesome work of art, it leads gallery visitors to find a woman (Kathryn Barnhardt) dead in her apartment above. Benson and Stabler look into the victim's personal contacts and find someone named Annette Cole (Kate Burton), who appears to be a friend in the wine industry. However, she is later revealed to be an abusive boss with a habit of beating and berating her employees. The troubled Cole kills herself in the middle of a press conference, leaving the detectives to try to fill in the missing gaps. They are eventually able to find the killer (Shane McRae) through a bizarre piece of evidence.
267	19	"Bombshell"	Patrick Creadon	Daniel Truly	March 23, 2011	1219	8.84
When a man (Tom Irwin) is found stabbed in a parking garage, Benson and Stabler discover that he and his wife are swingers. When the detectives go undercover at a swingers club, they meet a popular woman (Rose McGowan) and an intruder who she claims is her obsessive, jealous ex-boyfriend (Ryan Hurst). However, further investigation reveals that they have a different type of relationship. As tensions grow, the detectives question just how far jealousy can push someone.: This was the final episode to feature BD Wong (Dr. George Huang) as a regular. His departure from the cast was not announced until July 2011.
268	20	"Totem"	Jonathan Kaplan	Jonathan Greene	March 30, 2011	1220	8.54
A young girl is found dead with a doll left as a totem. With Dr. Huang out of town, Benson and Stabler ask a psychiatrist from one of their previous cases, Cap Jackson (Jeremy Irons), for help. Jackson joins the detectives as they retrace the girl's last steps and go to meet with her piano teacher (Elizabeth Mitchell). During the questioning, his skills prove invaluable in deciphering the meaning of the totem, ultimately finding the killer. Jackson and the detectives learn that the piano teacher was lying to protect her sister (Agatha Nowicki) and that both women suffered from abuse at the hands of their mother (Lisa Banes).
269	21	"Reparations"	Constantine Makris	Christine M. Torres	April 6, 2011	1221	8.29
A woman (Virginia Kull) is raped in her apartment and her friend (Afton Williamson) suspects that the rapist is one of the students from the inner city school where she teaches. However, the teacher accuses someone else (Vondie Curtis-Hall), who happens to be the cousin of Los Angeles Deputy DA Joe Dekker (Terrence Howard). ADA Casey Novak (Diane Neal) returns to Special Victims after a three-year censure and challenges Dekker in court. The detectives discover a history of racism involving the victim's family and the suspect's family and Novak must convince both sides to tell the truth. Novak and Stabler learn that the intruder entered the victim's home intending to commit rape to get revenge for his mother (Irma P. Hall), who was raped by the teacher's grandfather (Robert Hogan).: Special appearance by Terrence Howard as DDA Joe Dekker.
270	22	"Bang"	Peter Leto	Speed Weed	May 4, 2011	1222	8.53
After a man (Jordan Dean) abandons a baby in an alley, Benson and Stabler go in search of the child's caregiver. Upon meeting the nanny (Marta Milans) and her boyfriend (John Stamos), they soon realize that he is also engaged to the baby's adoptive mother (Lori Singer). Multiple references to broken condoms convince the detectives that he has a malevolent hobby. They enlist the help of an expert (Noelle Beck) in trying to prosecute him but they are frustrated to learn that the law is on his side.
271	23	"Delinquent"	Holly Dale	Dawn DeNoon	May 11, 2011	1223	8.10
When a young woman (Marina Squerciati) finds a teenage boy (Sterling Beaumon) asleep and naked in her bedroom, the boy's mother (Rita Wilson) is quick to defend his actions. During his arraignment, the manipulative teenager accuses Stabler of inappropriate touching, which leads to a restraining order being filed and an IAB investigation. Benson and Stabler learn that the boy has a history of stalking and alcohol abuse and suspect him of being a serial rapist. Stabler puts his career on the line by trying to catch the suspect in the act and learns about someone else (Anne Kyle) who played a role in shaping his sociopathic behavior.
272	24	"Smoked"	Helen Shaver	Jonathan Greene & Daniel Truly	May 18, 2011	1224	8.98
When a woman (Alice Barrett) is murdered during an afternoon shopping trip with her daughter (Hayley McFarland), Benson and Stabler are called in because she was scheduled to testify in their high-profile rape case. Benson and Stabler initially eye the accused rapist (Andrew Howard), but they discover that he might have been framed by someone (Michael Raymond-James). Stabler gets wrapped up in an ATF sting against a cigarette smuggling ring and discovers that the ATF agent running the operation (Pedro Pascal) is dirty, which leads them to arrest three suspects. Just when they are satisfied that the case has been closed, tragedy strikes in the squad room.: Christopher Meloni (Detective Elliot Stabler) departed the cast after this episode.
