= Corey Stoll =

American actor (born 1976)

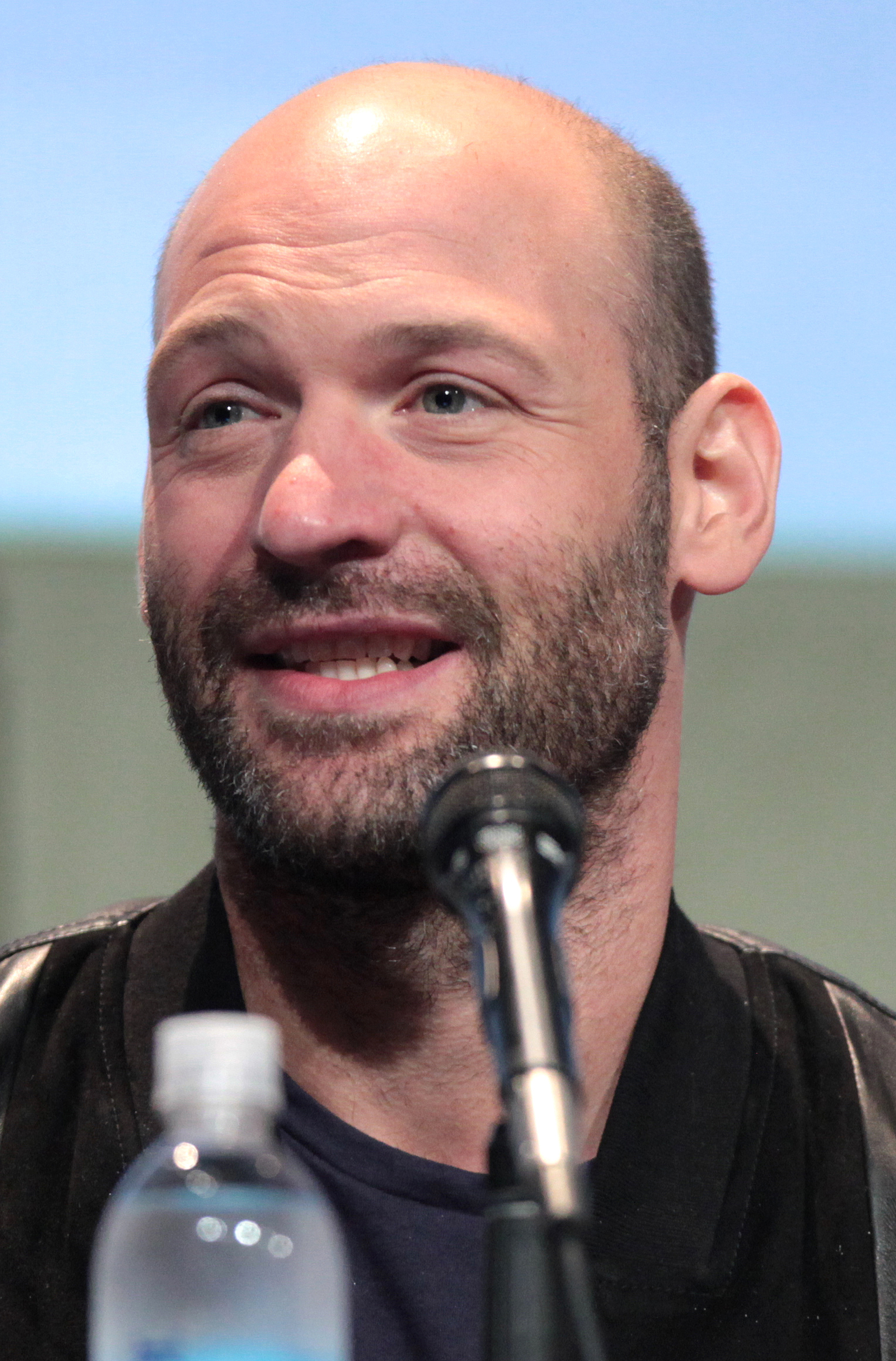
- Stoll in 2015
- Born: March 14, 1976 (age 50); New York City, U.S.
- Education: Oberlin College (BA); New York University (MFA)
- Occupation: Actor
- Years active: 2001–present
- Spouse: Nadia Bowers (m. 2015)
- Children: 1

Corey Daniel Stoll (born March 14, 1976) is an American actor. He is best known for his roles as Congressman Peter Russo in the first season of the Netflix political thriller series House of Cards (2013–2016), for which he received a Golden Globe nomination in 2013, and Dr. Ephraim Goodweather on the FX horror drama series The Strain (2014–2017). From 2020 to 2023, he portrayed Michael Prince, a business rival to protagonist Bobby Axelrod, in the Showtime series Billions. He was also a regular cast member on the NBC drama series Law & Order: LA (2010–2011).

Stoll played Darren Cross / Yellowjacket / M.O.D.O.K. in the Marvel Cinematic Universe films Ant-Man (2015) and Ant-Man and the Wasp: Quantumania (2023). For his portrayal of Ernest Hemingway in Woody Allen's Midnight in Paris (2011) he was nominated for the Independent Spirit Award for Best Supporting Male. His other notable films include Black Mass (2015), First Man (2018), The Seagull (2018), The Many Saints of Newark (2021), and West Side Story (2021). He acted off-Broadway in Intimate Apparel (2004) and on Broadway in Appropriate (2023).

== Early life and education ==
Corey Stoll was born on the Upper West Side of New York City's Manhattan borough, the son of Judith and Stephen Stoll. His father co-founded The Beacon School. Stoll was raised Jewish. He studied drama at Long Lake Camp for the Arts from 1988 to 1992, and is a drama graduate of Fiorello H. LaGuardia High School of Music & Art and Performing Arts. He graduated from Oberlin College in 1998 and enrolled in the Graduate Acting Program at New York University's Tisch School of the Arts, graduating in 2003.

== Career ==
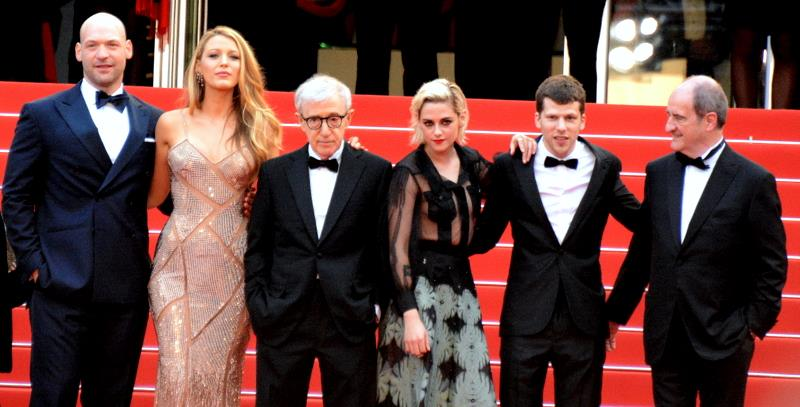
Stoll (far left) with the cast and crew of Café Society at the 2016 Cannes Film Festival

Stoll made his Broadway debut as a member of the ensemble in the 2003 revival of William Shakespeare's Henry IV at the Vivian Beaumont Theatre. The following year Stoll received a Drama Desk Award nomination as Outstanding Featured Actor in a Play for Intimate Apparel (2004), opposite Tony winner and Oscar winner Viola Davis. Stoll returned to Broadway in John Van Druten's Old Acquaintance (2007) and went on to appear in several films, including North Country (2005), Lucky Number Slevin (2006), the television film A Girl Like Me: The Gwen Araujo Story (2006), Brief Interviews with Hideous Men (2009), and Push (2009). In 2010, he appeared in drama film Helena from the Wedding and the action thriller Salt. Stoll portrayed Marco in the 2010 Broadway revival of the Arthur Miller play A View from the Bridge acting opposite Liev Schreiber and Scarlett Johansson.

Stoll starred as LAPD Detective Tomas Jaruszalski on the NBC police drama Law & Order: LA. He played Ernest Hemingway in Woody Allen's romantic comedy film Midnight in Paris (2011) for which he earned acclaim as well as a nomination for the Independent Spirit Award for Best Supporting Male. Stoll, who is mostly bald, wore a custom wig for the role. In 2013, Stoll received a Golden Globe Award nomination for his performance in the Netflix series House of Cards. He then joined the FX horror television series The Strain, which is based on a series of novels written by Chuck Hogan and film director Guillermo del Toro.

In 2014, Stoll also played Austin Reilly, an NYPD police officer, in the action film Non-Stop, and Paul Altman in the comedy-drama This Is Where I Leave You. In 2015, he played Ben Day in the film Dark Places, based on the novel by Gillian Flynn, and had a major role as the villain in the superhero film Ant-Man, playing Darren Cross, later reimagined as the supervillain Yellowjacket. The following year, he reunited with Woody Allen, playing gangster Ben Dorfman in his 2016 film Café Society. Also in the summer of 2016, he played the wily Greek warrior Ulysses in the Public Theater production of Troilus and Cressida by William Shakespeare, in Central Park.

In January 2019, it was announced that Stoll would recur in the Netflix drama series Ratched. Since 2020, he has portrayed Michael Prince, a business rival to Bobby Axelrod, in the Showtime series Billions. In 2023 he returned to Broadway in the Branden Jacobs-Jenkins play Appropriate acting opposite Sarah Paulson, Natalie Gold and Elle Fanning. For his performance he was nominated for the Tony Award for Best Featured Actor in a Play.

Stoll co-starred in an off-Broadway revival of What Happened Was..., which opened at the Minetta Lane Theatre on April 14, 2026.

== Personal life ==
Stoll became engaged to his girlfriend Nadia Bowers, an actress, in October 2014. They were married on June 21, 2015. They had their first child in October 2015.

== Acting credits ==
=== Film ===
Year	Title	Role	Notes
2001	Okénka		Short film
2005	North Country	Ricky Sennett	
2006	Lucky Number Slevin	Saul	
2007	The Number 23	Sgt. Burns	
2009	Brief Interviews with Hideous Men	Subject No. 51	
2009	Push	Agent Mack	
2010	Helena from the Wedding	Steven	
2010	Salt	Schnaider	
2011	Midnight in Paris	Ernest Hemingway	
2012	The Bourne Legacy	Zev Vendel	
2012	The Time Being	Eric	
2012	Victoriana	Bill	
2013	C.O.G.	Curly	
2013	Decoding Annie Parker	Sean	
2014	Non-Stop	Austin Reilly	
2014	Glass Chin	Bud Gordon	
2014	This Is Where I Leave You	Paul Altman	
2014	The Good Lie	Jack	
2015	Dark Places	Ben Day	
2015	Anesthesia	Sam	
2015	Ant-Man	Darren Cross / Yellowjacket	
2015	Black Mass	Fred Wyshak	
2016	Café Society	Ben	
2016	Gold	Brian Wolff	
2018	The Seagull	Boris Trigorin	
2018	First Man	Buzz Aldrin	
2018	Driven	Benedict Tisa	
2019	The Report	Cyrus Clifford	
2021	The Many Saints of Newark	Corrado "Junior" Soprano	
2021	West Side Story	Police Lieutenant Schrank	
2022	What We Do Next	Paul Jenkins	
2023	Ant-Man and the Wasp: Quantumania	Darren Cross / M.O.D.O.K.	
2023	Rebel Moon	Sindri	
2024	Justice League: Crisis on Infinite Earths – Part Three	Lex Luthor (voice)	Direct-to-video
2026	Matchbox: The Movie	Mosier	

Key
†	Denotes films that have not yet been released

=== Television ===
Year	Title	Role	Notes
2004	CSI: Crime Scene Investigation	Sex Shop Clerk	Episode: "What's Eating Gilbert Grissom?"
2004	Charmed	Demon	Episode: "Witchness Protection"
2004	NYPD Blue	Martin Schweiss	Episode: "The Dead Donald"
2005	Alias	Sasha Korjev	Episode: "The Road Home"
2005	Numb3rs	Agent Reacher	Episode: "Sacrifice"
2005	ER	Teddy Marsh	Episode: "Cañon City"
2005	CSI: Miami	Craig Seaborn	Episode: "Three-Way"
2006	Law & Order	Gerald Ruane	Episode: "Heart of Darkness"
2006	A Girl Like Me: The Gwen Araujo Story	Joey Marino	Television film
2006	Without a Trace	Steve Goodman	Episode: "Candy"
2006	The Unit	Intel Type (Bobby Carrol)	Episode: "Old Home Week"
2006	Standoff	Dr. Wayne	Episode: "Life Support"
2006	The Nine	Alex Kent	2 episodes
2006–2007	NCIS	Martin Quinn	3 episodes
2009	Life on Mars	Det. Ventura / Russell	Episode: "Home Is Where You Hang Your Holster"
2009	The Unusuals	Lewis Powell	Episode: "The Circle Line"
2009	The Good Wife	Collin Grant	Episode: "Stripped"
2010–2011	Law & Order: LA	Det. Tomas "TJ" Jaruszalski	22 episodes
2012	Christine	Max	2 episodes
2013, 2016	House of Cards	Rep. Peter Russo	12 episodes
2014	The Normal Heart	John Bruno	Television film
2014	Homeland	Sandy Bachman	Episode: "The Drone Queen"
2014–2017	The Strain	Dr. Ephraim Goodweather	45 episodes
2014–2017	American Dad!	Vincent Edmonds, Nicholas Dawson, Carnival Barker	Voice; 4 episodes
2015	WHIH Newsfront	Darren Cross	Episode: "WIRED Insider Interviews Darren Cross, CEO of Pym Technologies"
2016–2017	Girls	Dill Harcourt	5 episodes
2017	A Season with Navy Football	Narrator	13 episodes
2018	The Romanoffs	Michael Romanoff	Episode: "The Royal We"
2018–2020	American Experience	Narrator	4 episodes
2019	The Deuce	Hank Jaffe	7 episodes
2020	Ratched	Charles Wainwright	3 episodes
2020	Baghdad Central	Captain John Perodi	6 episodes
2020–2023	Billions	Michael Prince	Recurring (season 5); Main cast (season 6–7)
2021	Scenes from a Marriage	Peter	Miniseries, 2 episodes
2022–2023	Pantheon	Jake, News Anchor (voices)	2 episodes
2023	Transatlantic	Graham Patterson	Miniseries, 7 episodes
2024	Twilight of the Gods	Hrafnkel (voice)	Episode: "You Will Gladden His Ravens"
2025	The Better Sister	Adam Macintosh	8 episodes
2026	Imperfect Women	Howard	7 episodes

=== Theatre ===
Year	Title	Role	Venue	Ref.
2003	Henry IV	Ensemble	Vivian Beaumont Theatre, Broadway	
2004	Intimate Apparel	Mr. Marks	Laura Pels Theatre	
2007	Old Acquaintance	Rudd Kendall	American Airlines Theatre, Broadway	
2008	Some Americans Abroad	Philip Brown	Second Stage Theatre	
2008	Beast	Banquo / Seyton	New York Theatre Workshop	
2010	A View from the Bridge	Marco	Cort Theatre, Broadway	
2016	Troilus and Cressida	Ulysses	Shakespeare in the Park	
2016	Plenty	Raymond Brock	The Public Theater	
2017	Julius Caesar	Marcus Brutus	Shakespeare in the Park	
2018	Othello	Iago	Shakespeare in the Park	
2019	Macbeth	Macbeth	Classic Stage Company	
2023	Appropriate	Bo Lafayette	Hayes Theater, Belasco Theatre, Broadway	

== Awards and nominations ==
Year	Association	Category	Project	Result	Ref.
2004	Drama Desk Award	Outstanding Featured Actor in a Play	Intimate Apparel	Nominated	
2011	Independent Spirit Award	Best Supporting Male	Midnight in Paris	Nominated	
2013	Golden Globe Award	Best Supporting Actor - Television	House of Cards	Nominated	
2013	Critics' Choice Television Award	Best Supporting Actor in a Drama Series	House of Cards	Nominated	
2013	Satellite Award	Best Supporting Actor - Television	House of Cards	Nominated	
2016	Joe A. Callaway Award		Troilus and Cressida	Won	
2024	Tony Award	Best Featured Actor in a Play	Appropriate	Nominated	
