= Rachel Ticotin =

American actress (born 1958)

- Born: November 1, 1958 (age 68); New York City, New York, U.S.
- Education: Columbia University (BA)
- Occupation: Actress
- Years active: 1978–present
- Spouses: David Caruso (m. 1984; div. 1987) Peter Strauss (m. 1998)
- Children: 1

Rachel Ticotin Strauss (born November 1, 1958) is an American actress and dancer. She has played prominent roles in films such as Fort Apache, The Bronx (1981), Total Recall (1990), Falling Down (1993), Don Juan DeMarco (1994), Con Air (1997), Man on Fire (2004), and The Sisterhood of the Traveling Pants (2005). She is also known for her television work, notably as Lt. Arleen Gonzales on Law & Order: LA (2010–11) and the voice of Capt. Maria Chavez on the animated series Gargoyles (1994–97).

== Early life ==
Ticotin was born in The Bronx in 1958, one of six children born to a Puerto Rican mother and a Russian-Jewish father. Her father was a used-car salesman. She began taking dance lessons at age 9 under Tina Ramirez, and joined her Ballet Hispanico at age 14, performing with the company for four years. She worked with choreographers like Alvin Ailey, Donald McKayle, Anna Sokolow and Geoffrey Holder. Ticotin graduated from Professional Children's School.

Ticotin earned money for acting lessons by working as a babysitter, in addition to managing New York's Public Theater and working as an usher there. She also was a production assistant for some films made in New York.

== Career ==
In 1978, Ticotin made her film debut as a dancer in the film King of the Gypsies. She also acted in the Off-Broadway production of Miguel Piñero's The Sun Always Shines for the Cool. During this period, she received an onscreen credit as a production assistant on Brian De Palma's Dressed to Kill and Martin Scorsese's Raging Bull. Her first big break came when, working as a production assistant alongside her brother David in 1981, she was given a significant role as Isabella, Paul Newman's love interest in the movie Fort Apache, The Bronx (1981). That same year, she was listed as one of 12 promising new actors in John A. Willis' Screen World Vol. 33.

In 1983, she landed a regular role on NBC's television drama For Love and Honor. Other television projects in which she has appeared include: Ohara (1987), Prison Stories: Women on the Inside (1991), Crime & Punishment (1993), Disney's Gargoyles (1994), and First Time Felon (1997).

Ticotin's film work includes: Critical Condition (1987) as Rachel Atwood (alongside Richard Pryor), Total Recall (1990) as Melina (alongside Arnold Schwarzenegger and Sharon Stone), Where the Day Takes You (1992) as Officer Landers (alongside Sean Astin, Lara Flynn Boyle, and Will Smith), Falling Down (1993) as Detective Sandra Torres (alongside Michael Douglas and Robert Duvall), and Con Air (1997) (alongside Nicolas Cage, John Cusack, and John Malkovich), in which she earned an ALMA Award for her role as prison guard Sally Bishop. In 1995, she played the role of Doña Inez, the Mexican mother of Don Juan, in the tongue-in-cheek romantic comedy Don Juan DeMarco, with Johnny Depp playing the title role.

Ticotin has participated in over 40 films and television series, appearing in Man on Fire (2004) as Mariana (alongside Denzel Washington), and The Sisterhood of the Traveling Pants (2005). Ticotin was cast as Vangie Gonzalez Taylor in the second season of PBS's television series American Family alongside Edward James Olmos, Esai Morales, Raquel Welch, and Kate del Castillo. Ticotin also appeared in season two of the ABC series Lost as Captain Teresa Cortez, mother of Michelle Rodriguez's character Ana Lucia Cortez.

In September 2010, she joined the cast of the NBC legal drama Law & Order: LA as Lieutenant Arleen Gonzales in place of Wanda De Jesus, who originally played the role. Ticotin reshot the scenes originally performed by De Jesus. She also played Dr. Marie Cerone on the ABC medical drama television series Grey's Anatomy in 2018.

== Personal life ==
Ticotin was married to actor David Caruso from 1984 to 1987, with whom she has a daughter (Greta), born in 1984. Since 1998, she has been married to actor Peter Strauss.

In her 50s, she enrolled in Columbia University, studying English, and graduating in 2019. At age 60, she was the first of her six siblings to earn a college degree.

Ticotin has co-directed the annual Rising Stars show at Fiorello H. LaGuardia High School since 2010.

== Filmography ==
=== Film ===
Year	Title	Role	Notes
1978	King of the Gypsies	Gypsy Dancer	
1981	Fort Apache, The Bronx	Isabella	
1987	Critical Condition	Rachel Atwood	
1990	Total Recall	Melina	
1991	One Good Cop	Detective Grace	
1991	F/X2	Kim Brandon	
1992	Where the Day Takes You	Officer Landers	
1993	Falling Down	Detective Sandra Torres	
1994	Natural Born Killers	Wanda Bisbing	Deleted role
1994	Criminal Passion	Tracy Perry	
1994	Don Juan DeMarco	Doña Inez	
1995	Steal Big Steal Little	Laura Martinez	
1997	Turbulence	Rachel Taper	
1997	Con Air	Guard Sally Bishop	
1999	Can't Be Heaven	Maggie	
2000	Civility	Rebecca Russo	
2001	Full Disclosure	Armiti Khalq	
2002	Desert Saints	Dora	
2003	Something's Gotta Give	Dr. Martinez	
2004	Man on Fire	Mariana Garcia Guerrero	
2005	The Sisterhood of the Traveling Pants	Christina Lowell	
2008	The Eye	Rosa Martinez	
2008	The Sisterhood of the Traveling Pants 2	Christina Lowell	
2008	The Burning Plain	Ana	
2011	America	Esther	
2020	Superintelligence	NSA Director Tyson	
2026	Diamond	Mrs. Echevarria	

=== Television ===
Year	Title	Role	Notes
1983–84	For Love and Honor	Cpl. Grace Pavlik	12 episodes
1985–86	Our Family Honor	Karen Pellagrino	Episodes: "Crimes of Passion: Parts 1 & 2"
1986	Stingray	Elena Ballesteros	Episode: "Ancient Eyes"
1987–88	Ohara	Teresa Storm	Main cast; Season 2
1993	Crime & Punishment	Det. Annette Rey	6 episodes
1994	Tales from the Crypt	Charbonnet / Lilian	Episode: "Staired in Horror"
1994–96	Gargoyles	Cpt. Maria Chavez (voice)	12 episodes
2001	The Outer Limits	Theodora 'Teddi' Madden	Episode: "Mona Lisa"
2002	American Family	Vangie Gonzalez Taylor	6 episodes
2003–05	Skin	Laura Roam	6 episodes
2005–06	Lost	Cpt. Teresa Cortez	Episodes: "Collision" and "Two for the Road"
2007	John from Cincinnati	Woman In Jail Cell	Episode: "His Visit: Day One"
2009	Weeds	Candela	Episode: "All About My Mom"
2010–11	Law & Order: LA	Lt. Arleen Gonzales	Main cast
2012	Unforgettable	Sharon Vega	Episode: "Allegiances"
2012	NCIS: Los Angeles	Monica Tenez	Episode: "Dead Body Politic"
2013	Blue Bloods	Carmen Castillo	Episode: "Warrior"
2017	Homeland	Mercedes	Episode: "The Return"
2018	Grey's Anatomy	Dr. Marie Cerone	3 episodes
2019	The Act	Gina	4 episodes
2023	NCIS	Joy Aaronson	Episode: "Bridges"
2026	Sheriff Country	Eva Santos	3 episodes

==== TV films and miniseries ====
Year	Title	Role	Notes
1985	Love, Mary	Rachel Martin	
1986	Rockabye	Victoria Garcia	
1986	When the Bough Breaks	Raquel Santos	
1988	Spies, Lies & Naked Thighs	Sonia	
1991	Prison Stories: Women on the Inside	Iris	
1992	Keep the Change	Astrid	
1992	From the Files of Joseph Wambaugh: A Jury of One	Christine Avila	
1994	Thicker Than Blood: The Larry McLinden Story	Diane	
1994	Deconstructing Sarah	Elizabeth Davis	
1995	The Wharf Rat	Dexter Ireland	
1997	First Time Felon	McBride	
1999	Aftershock: Earthquake in New York	Elizabeth Perez	
2001	Warden of Red Rock	Maria McVale	
2015	The Curse of the Fuentes Women	Esperanza Fuentes	
2016	Secret Summer	Ms. Annie Archer	

== Awards and nominations ==
Awards	Year	Category	Work	Result	Ref.
ALMA Award	1998	Outstanding Actress in a Made-for-Television Movie or Mini-Series	First Time Felon	Nominated	
ALMA Award	1998	Outstanding Actress in a Feature Film	Con Air	Nominated	
Blockbuster Entertainment Award	1998	Favorite Supporting Actress in an Action/Adventure Film	Con Air	Nominated	
Saturn Award	1991	Best Supporting Actress	Total Recall	Nominated	

== See also ==
- List of Puerto Ricans
