= Keep the Change (1992 film) =

- Genre: Western
- Based on: Keep the Change by Thomas McGuane
- Teleplay by: John Miglis
- Directed by: Andy Tennant
- Starring: William Petersen; Lolita Davidovich; Rachel Ticotin; Buck Henry; Fred Dalton Thompson; Jeff Kober; Lois Smith; Jack Palance
- Music by: John M. Keane
- Country of origin: United States
- Original language: English

Production
- Executive producer: Steve Tisch
- Producers: Cindy Chvatal; William Petersen
- Cinematography: Mark Irwin
- Editor: Michael Brown
- Running time: 95 minutes
- Production companies: Turner Pictures; High Horse Films; The Steve Tisch Company
- Budget: $3 million

Original release
- Network: TNT
- Release: June 9, 1992

Keep the Change is a 1992 American Western television film directed by Andy Tennant and written by John Miglis, based on the 1989 novel of the same name by Thomas McGuane. It stars William Petersen, Lolita Davidovich, Rachel Ticotin, Buck Henry, Fred Dalton Thompson, Jeff Kober, Lois Smith, and Jack Palance. Keep the Change premiered on TNT on June 9, 1992. It won a Spur Award from the Western Writers of America in 1992.

== Plot ==
Joe Starling, a failing artist, who deserted his family's ranch to live in California with his girlfriend Astrid. However, he leaves Astrid behind and returns to his home in Montana in search of life's meaning, and to resolve a mid-life identity crisis by raising cattle. But once he arrives back, he discovers his old rival, Overstreet, a tough, rugged rancher who hasn't changed, will stop at nothing to get Joe's family's land into his hands. Both men are pitted against each other in a struggle for land. Along the way, Joe encounters ghost from the past, including Overstreet's daughter and his old high school sweetheart Ellen. He discovers she has a daughter, who he didn't know he's the father, and she married his old high school rival Billy Kelton, which becomes complicated. He soon realize that he too has a dark secret, that he's able to come to terms of what he's dealt with in the past.

== Cast ==
- William Petersen as Joe Starling
- Lolita Davidovich as Ellen Kelton
- Rachel Ticotin as Astrid
- Buck Henry as Smitty
- Fred Dalton Thompson as Otis
- Jeff Kober as Billy Kelton
- Lois Smith as Lureen
- Jack Palance as Overstreet
- Frank Collison as Darryl Burke

== Production ==
Ron Carr, a freelance location manager for TNT, said that much of the film would be shot in Montana.

With a budget at $3 million, principal photography began on September 9, 1991. Filming the cattle scenes took place at Ted Turner's Flying D. Ranch near Gallatin Gateway, Montana. All the ranch scenes were filmed at Paradise Valley, Montana. The town scenes were filmed in Livingston, Montana. The beginning of the film was shot in Los Angeles. Production lasted for 22 days, and was completed on October 1, 1991.

== Release ==
Keep the Change aired on TNT on June 9, 1992.
