= Law & Order: LA =

American television series (2010–2011)

- Also known as: Law & Order: Los Angeles (original title); L&O: LA; LOLA
- Genre: Police procedural; Legal drama
- Created by: Dick Wolf
- Developed by: Blake Masters
- Starring: Skeet Ulrich; Corey Stoll; Rachel Ticotin; Regina Hall; Megan Boone; Alfred Molina; Terrence Howard; Alana de la Garza; Wanda De Jesus
- Narrated by: Steven Zirnkilton
- Opening theme: "Theme of Law & Order: LA"
- Composers: Atli Örvarsson; Mike Post (theme)
- Country of origin: United States
- Original language: English
- No. of seasons: 1
- No. of episodes: 22

Production
- Executive producers: René Balcer; Blake Masters; Peter Jankowski; Christopher Misiano; Dick Wolf
- Production locations: NBC Studios Burbank in and around Los Angeles
- Running time: 45 minutes (approx.)
- Production companies: Wolf Films; Universal Media Studios

Original release
- Network: NBC
- Release: September 29, 2010 – July 11, 2011

Related
- Law & Order franchise

Law & Order: LA, originally titled Law & Order: Los Angeles, is an American police procedural and legal drama television series set in Los Angeles, where it was produced. Created and produced by Dick Wolf and developed by Blake Masters, it premiered on NBC on September 29, 2010, as the fifth series in Wolf's Law & Order franchise. Law & Order: LA debuted after the original Law & Order ended its 20-year run the previous spring. The show received a full-season pickup on October 18, 2010. On January 18, 2011, however, NBC announced that it was putting the series on hold indefinitely. By the time the series returned on April 11, 2011, it had gone through a creative overhaul, including the release of a number of cast members, changing the vocations or responsibilities for some characters, and the shortening of the series title. On May 13, 2011, NBC canceled the series after one season.

== Production ==
=== History and development ===
On January 10, 2010, NBC programming chief Angela Bromstad announced at the winter TCA Press Tour that the network was in talks with Dick Wolf about producing a new series, titled Law & Order: Los Angeles, and indicated that NBC was seeking to hire writers for a pilot.

Reports in early May suggested that NBC had made the decision to pick up Law & Order: Los Angeles with a 13-episode order for fall 2010, having brought Brotherhood creator Blake Masters on board to co-create the new series set in Los Angeles with Wolf. NBC confirmed the new series order on May 14, 2010. René Balcer served as showrunner and head writer on the series and executive produced alongside the pilot's writer Blake Masters, Wolf, Peter Jankowski and Christopher Misiano, previously of The West Wing.

The show received a full season pickup on October 18, 2010. It underwent a cast shake-up for a creative overhaul in January 2011; Skeet Ulrich, Regina Hall, and Megan Boone departed the cast. The show jumped to the episodes with the new cast airing first. The remaining episodes with the original cast began airing on May 30, 2011 with the episode "Plummer Park".

=== Broadcast history ===
The show was originally broadcast in the Wednesday 10:00 p.m. timeslot after Law & Order: Special Victims Unit on NBC. Following the hiatus, the series moved to Monday nights at 10:00 p.m.

=== Cancellation ===
NBC canceled Law & Order: LA on May 13, 2011, almost one year after NBC canceled the original Law & Order series. NBC Chairman Robert Greenblatt gave creator Dick Wolf credit for reinventing the show and said, "We tried but we didn't have the time period to bring it back if it isn't going to show signs of growth."

Greenblatt also said to TV Guide when they asked about the cancellation, "We moved it around, took it off the schedule and tried to revamp it. It improved significantly creatively, and it didn't have a great lead-in on Mondays. It was one of those tough decisions: do we stick with it or was it time to move on?" Before the upfronts Greenblatt added, "Law & Order: LA, I think we just didn't get it off the ground right. It was put on the schedule without a pilot last fall before I arrived. There was all kinds of chaos going on: the show did well then it was taken off. In a different scenario that might have worked better but we just thought it wasn't a strong enough player to continue into next season." Showrunner René Balcer released a video shortly after its cancellation was announced, urging fans to call NBC to renew the series, and stating that the season would end with a cliff-hanger. (However, due to the episodes being aired out of sequence, the episode he referred to, "Hayden Tract", was in fact not the final episode to be aired.)

Law & Order: LA became the third Law & Order series to be cancelled by NBC at the time; the second to be cancelled after only one season, Law & Order: Trial by Jury (cancelled in 2005) being the first.

== Casting ==
The first casting was announced in June 2010 when Skeet Ulrich was cast as LAPD Detective Rex Winters; as a result of the creative overhaul performed during the extended mid-season break (mid-January 2011 to mid-April 2011), Ulrich's character was killed in the line of duty by a drug cartel. Corey Stoll portrays LAPD Detective Tomas "TJ" Jaruszalski, originally partnered with Rex Winters, later with Ricardo Morales. Wanda De Jesus originally portrayed Lieutenant Arleen Gonzales on July 31, 2010, but left in September after filming only the first two episodes. Rachel Ticotin later joined the cast as Gonzales, replacing De Jesus, re-shooting her scenes after the pilot episode.

Cast of Law & Order: LA after the revamp (2011). From left to right: Terrence Howard, Alana de la Garza, Corey Stoll, and Alfred Molina.

Alfred Molina was cast as Deputy District Attorney Ricardo Morales; as a result of the creative overhaul performed during the extended mid-season break, his character resigns from the District Attorney's office out of frustration with the justice system and the prosecutorial politics, returning to his old job as a police detective, replacing Ulrich's Detective Winters. Regina Hall played DDA Morales' partner, Deputy District Attorney Evelyn Price. Her character resigns from the district attorney's office shortly after Molina's DDA Morales does. Hall was written out during the show's creative overhaul.

Terrence Howard joined the cast as Deputy District Attorney Jonah "Joe" Dekker whose character was set to work alongside Deputy D.A. Morales; Howard and Molina splitting the workload, each appearing roughly in half the episodes, thus allowing the show to star feature film actors and the actors to stay active in movies. When Morales decides to go back to being a detective, Dekker becomes the sole DA, another effect of the creative overhaul. Megan Boone was featured as Junior Deputy District Attorney Lauren Stanton, Dekker's assistant. Boone was written out during the creative overhaul, with the explanation that her character moved to D.C. when her boyfriend got a job there.

Following the show's revamp, Law & Order actress Alana de la Garza reprised her role as Connie Rubirosa, now Dekker's new partner. Rubirosa moves from New York City to Los Angeles to be close to her ailing mother.

== Cast and characters ==
=== Main cast ===
- Alfred Molina as Ricardo Morales; a Deputy District Attorney turned Senior LAPD Detective

==== Police ====
- Skeet Ulrich as Rex Winters; a Senior LAPD Detective
- Corey Stoll as Tomas "TJ" Jaruszalski; a Junior LAPD Detective
- Wanda de Jesus and Rachel Ticotin as Arleen Gonzales; an LAPD Lieutenant

==== Prosecutors ====
- Terrence Howard as Jonah "Joe" Dekker; a Deputy District Attorney
- Alana de la Garza as Connie Rubirosa; a Deputy District Attorney
- Regina Hall as Evelyn Price; a Deputy District Attorney
- Megan Boone as Lauren Stanton; a Deputy District Attorney

==== Other ====
- Peter Coyote as Jerry Hardin; a District Attorney

== Format ==
In the City of Los Angeles, the people are represented by two separate yet equally important groups: the police who investigate crime, and the district attorneys who prosecute the offenders. These are their stories.

— Opening narration spoken by Steven Zirnkilton

The description of the series, posted on NBC's official website, reads, "From Dick Wolf, comes a foray into the glitz, glamour and guilt of Los Angeles. From the tony Beverly Hills to the seedy side of Hollywood, LAPD's elite Robbery Homicide Division is on the case. Fusing classic ripped-from-the-headlines storytelling with the backdrop of LA, the series delves into the high-profile crimes of the West Coast." The format is similar to the other Law & Order shows, though adapted to the Los Angeles criminal justice system: each episode starts by depicting a crime, then presents the LAPD investigation, the prosecution by the L.A. County District Attorney, and the trial in the Los Angeles Superior Court. The crimes prosecuted are codified in the California Penal Code. As in other L.A. police procedural shows, crimes are sometimes referred to by their Penal Code section numbers.

Law & Order: LA is the only American Law & Order series set outside of New York City.

An opening narration was not used for the first two episodes. Starting with the third episode, the Steven Zirnkilton narration for the original Law & Order is used. The narration was modified after the hiatus to explicitly mention Los Angeles.

Originally, the series was the first in the franchise not to use a full-length theme showcasing each of the cast members. Instead, this variant utilized a short opening that displayed only the show's title and "Created by Dick Wolf". Starting with the sixth episode, this short opening was dropped completely; the series' cast is presented during the show's first act, before the episode's list of guest stars and crew.

With the cast changes after the hiatus, a full title sequence similar to the other series in the franchise was introduced. The show opens with a night view of the city skyline in gold. As the narration is spoken, labels of areas in and around the city appear as if floating above; from those letters float together to form the series title. After the opening scene in which the crime is established, a credits sequence shows the series' principals in slow motion while a faint arrangement of the traditional Law & Order theme plays.

The show continues to use the iconic Friz Quadrata typeface that is used throughout the Law & Order franchise for its credits.

== Episodes ==
The series frequently uses stories that are based on real crimes. Such episodes fictionalize a real crime by changing the details, similar to the earlier L.A. based crime series Dragnet. The episode titles are named for Los Angeles neighborhoods.

The series was released on DVD as a five disc set. All 22 episodes are included, as well as bonus features.

No.	Title	Directed by	Written by	Original release date	Prod. code	US viewers (millions)
1	"Hollywood"	Allen Coulter	Story by : Dick Wolf; Teleplay by : Blake Masters	September 29, 2010	01001	10.64
Detectives Winters and Jaruszalski are called to investigate when they suspect that a local actress, Chelsea Sennett (Danielle Panabaker), is part of a burglary ring targeting the homes of famous LA residents. They discover that the burglaries are committed by the remaining members of a gang while Chelsea escorts the homeowner out for the night. While following up leads regarding Chelsea's involvement, the Sennetts are burgled themselves – and Chelsea's mother Trudy shoots one of the assailants. When Chelsea denies all involvement in the burglaries, another likely suspect appears. Meanwhile, DDAs Morales and Price struggle to secure a conviction in court when it is discovered that the assailant that Trudy shot dead was having an affair with her at the time.: Inspired by the Bling Ring burglars, a group of teenagers and young adults accused of targeting homes of actors like Paris Hilton and Orlando Bloom.
2	"Echo Park"	Alex Chapple	Peter Blauner	October 6, 2010	01002	8.26
Detectives Winters and Jaruszalski investigate when a recently released convicted criminal, Jane Lee Rayburn (Nancy Youngblut) is found stabbed to death on one of LA's most famous beaches. They soon suspect that her killing was due to her role in a series of murders in Echo Park during 1979. However, when a testimony from Rayburn's cellmate, Maura Dillon (Bonnie Root) claims that Rayburn was sexually assaulting Dillon throughout her time in prison, a stronger motive begins to rear its head. It is discovered that Dillion was wrongly convicted six years ago of killing her children in a house fire, and that during questioning in the original investigation, Winters' wife Casey (Teri Polo), wrongly pressured the witness into making a confession. DDAs Dekker and Stanton must cope with Dillon's defense attorney (Jay Karnes), who threatens to reveal Casey's dark secrets to the jury.
3	"Harbor City"	Nick Gomez	Judith McCreary	October 13, 2010	01004	7.26
Detectives Winters and Jaruszalski investigate when a former professional surfer is found murdered in the office of his medicinal weed dispensary. They soon discover that three of the surfer's friends, Patrick Scott (Aaron Hill), Carlton Campbell (Jesse Luken) and Logan Rudman (Brandon Jones), may have been involved in the murder after they discover the money stolen from the dispensary's office in the fireplace of Grey Campbell (James Morrison), Carlton's father. Grey, Carlton and Logan had been attempting to run a campaign to stop the public using the spot of beach directly behind their house, and that after opposition from locals, including the victim, they decide to steal the money and make it look like a burglary. DDAs Morales and Price take the controversial step of indicting the group under an obscure anti-gang statute, which allows them to charge the father as an accomplice to the crime in order to break his alibi.
4	"Sylmar"	Constantine Makris	Richard Sweren	October 20, 2010	01005	8.12
Detectives Winters and Jaruszalski investigate when two children are killed in an explosion in a meth lab in Sylmar. They discover that the explosion was the result of deliberate interference with the lab, as someone had placed denatured alcohol into the mixture in an attempt to kill the dealer. They soon find that the explosion was caused by a group of out of state men and a local woman who have converted to radical Islam in an attempt to stop the drug crime in the local area. However, things soon become serious when a plot to blow up a cargo shipment at Los Angeles International Airport is uncovered. Although the bombing is prevented, DDAs Dekker and Stanton must fight the Justice Department after they learn the accused are to be tried for treason. Dekker must convince the Department of Defense that the accused must be tried for the murder of the two children in LA.: Inspired by the Jihad Jane case.
5	"Pasadena"	Roger Young	Debra J. Fisher	November 3, 2010	01006	7.83
Detectives Winters and Jaruszalski investigate when a woman who is four months pregnant is hit by a car. They learn that Rebecca Townley (Rebecca Mader) was having an affair with U.S. Congressman Thomas Nelson (John Hickey), and in order to prevent his wife finding out, was living with his employee, Adam Yarborough (Rob Benedict). The detectives soon discover that Nelson's wife, a seriously ill cancer patient, paid Rebecca's ex-husband, Robert Forrester (Michael Mosley) to kill Rebecca after she discovered her husband's deceit.: Inspired by the political scandal of U.S. Senator John Edwards, Democratic from North Carolina, from an extramarital affair and subsequent child with a campaign staff worker.
6	"Hondo Field"	Ed Bianchi	Michael S. Chernuchin	November 10, 2010	01007	6.80
Detectives Winters and Jaruszalski investigate when an oil rig worker is found dead just feet from the shoreline where he was working. They soon discover that Valerie Roberts (Sprague Grayden), the floor manager of the oil rig, had approached the victim on the night of his death and asked him to go on a date with her. They soon find evidence claiming that the murder was the result of the victim's rejection of Roberts and the fact that the majority of her male co-workers held a sexual grudge against her because she was a woman. When Roberts hires celebrity lawyer Sarah Goodwin (Natalie Zea), DDAs Dekker and Stanton realize they must go the extra mile to extract a confession from the accused. However, Goodwin's past relations with Dekker soon begin to cast a shadow over the trial.
7	"Ballona Creek"	Vincent Misiano	Richard Sweren	November 17, 2010	01008	7.84
Detectives Winters and Jaruszalski investigate when a maintenance worker is found murdered in the river that he was cleaning just hours earlier. The case soon takes a worrying turn when they discover that he was investigating a series of eight murders that were committed in the local area in the early 1990s. The detectives soon realize that none of the murders were ever linked, and as such, a serial killer managed to slip through the radar. However, luck appears to be thrown their way when a murder matching the MO of the original killings is committed just hours later. The case leads to the man's co-worker, who has been living under a false identity for several years and could well be the man they are looking for. DDAs Dekker and Stanton are troubled when the case reaches court after the initial charges are thrown out due to a technicality relating to the obtaining of DNA, and as such, the attorney's office must recreate their case from scratch in order to win a conviction.: Inspired by the murders committed by Lonnie David Franklin Jr.
8	"Playa Vista"	Jean de Segonzac	Julie Martin	December 1, 2010	01003	9.15
Detectives Winters and Jaruszalski investigate when female pro golfer Kristin Halstead is found murdered in her apartment. Their investigation leads to major pro golfer Chip Jarrow (Marc Blucas), a man with a well-known sex addiction problem. Kristin had been following Jarrow after he was spotted with a woman that Kristin believed was her girlfriend, and that she was blackmailing him by threatening to tell his wife. However, after they learn that Jarrow's wife already knows about his infidelity, the detectives soon begin to believe that Kristin was threatening Jarrow's son Luke (Hutch Dano). When the case reaches court, DDAs Dekker and Stanton discover that he committed the murder on the orders of his mother, Monica (Bellamy Young).: Inspired by the infidelity scandal of Tiger Woods and the fallout, as well as cases of parental alienation syndrome. This is also the last episode chronologically to star Megan Boone as DDA Lauren Stanton.
9	"Zuma Canyon"	Tom DiCillo	Richard Sweren	April 11, 2011	01014	6.10
Detectives Winters and Jaruszalski investigate when a quinceañera erupts in violence, leaving multiple people dead. The investigation leads to the homeowner, who was working on a project to turn a protected dope field in Zuma Canyon into housing blocks for poor families. During their search for answers, they find a young boy protecting the dope field and discover he is the only witness that can help their case. As the detectives begin to close in on a suspect, Winters is murdered in a drive-by shooting at his house. Distraught by the death of his best friend and colleague, Jaruszalski goes all out to secure a suspect. DDAs Morales and Price must risk upsetting the Mexican government by prosecuting the defendant (Jose Pablo Cantillo). However, after the only witness is murdered in a police holding cell, the case falls apart and the murderer is released. Morales tries to convince DA Hardin to find another way of securing a conviction, but after a stern warning, makes a shocking decision to return to the police force and leave the DA's office.: Show name changed to Law & Order: LA as of this episode.
10	"Silver Lake"	Christopher Misiano	Peter Blauner	April 11, 2011	01015	6.10
Detectives Morales and Jaruszalski investigate when a woman is brutally raped and murdered in her own home, whilst her husband (Tim DeKay) is tied up in the bathroom and her son is murdered in cold blood. The case leads the detectives to discover a series of similar cases committed by a serial rapist, and after a short investigation, their main suspect emerges as disturbed Secret Service agent Ray Garson (Jason Beghe). When the case reaches court, DDA Dekker and his new partner DDA Connie Rubirosa struggle to convince the judge to proceed to trial after Detective Morales' actions in regard to questioning the defendant, and the exclusion of a body in a murder case linked to the series of rapes. Hanging by a thread, Dekker realizes his only hope to secure a conviction is to unthread a secure web of details in order to catch the killer red handed.: Alana de la Garza joins the cast in this episode as DDA Connie Rubirosa. Inspired by the case of Russell Williams in Canada.
11	"East Pasadena"	Christopher Misiano	Richard Sweren	April 18, 2011	01019	5.12
Detectives Morales and Jaruszalski investigate when a high speed car chase results in the discovery of a woman's body. They soon begin to suspect the victim's boyfriend, who was jealous after he believed she was having an affair with one of her co-workers. However, he divulges information which leads the detectives to believe that the victim had come across a scam at her place of work, in which council workers were charging $100 for fake work permits to allow traders to work in East Pasadena. They soon discover that the victim's murder may be on the orders of one of the highest-ranking councilmen in power. As the trail of the murder investigation uncovers massive corruption in City Hall, Detective Morales' efficiency as a police officer comes under scrutiny after he shoots two of the suspected conspirators in the victim's murder. DDAs Dekker and Rubirosa attempt to maintain order as the case gains media publicity, and citizens begin to mobilize in protest.: Inspired by the 2010 City of Bell scandal.
12	"Benedict Canyon"	Alex Chapple	Michael S. Chernuchin	April 25, 2011	01018	5.79
Detectives Morales and Jaruszalski investigate when successful Hollywood stylist Lily Walker is shot through the head while sitting in her car. Fingerprints on the car door lead to a convicted criminal who had been released on parole just three weeks prior to the murder. The detectives track him down, but when confronted by detectives, he commits suicide with his own gun. They soon discover his innocence in the case, and that the fingerprints on the car door had been lifted from his apartment and placed on the car to incriminate him. The case soon leads to Lily's best friend, a fellow Hollywood stylist who was ousted after Lily discovered she had been illegally pocketing money that belonged to the state. As the fellow stylist's driver admits to the murder committed on her orders, DDAs Dekker and Rubirosa navigate their way through the details in hope of bringing the real culprit to justice.: Inspired by the murder of Hollywood publicist, Ronni Chasen.
13	"Reseda"	Alex Chapple	David Matthews	May 2, 2011	01016	4.85
Detectives Morales and Jaruszalski investigate when a bank robbery is committed under the false pretense that the robber has kidnapped the bank teller's son. They soon discover the boy is alive and well in school, and the photo shown to the teller had been created on photoshop in a nearby internet cafe. A similar motive for a second robbery soon comes to the surface, but as the detectives close in on the suspect, Jaruszalski finds his life in danger, and a young uniform recruit loses his leg in a deadly explosion. When the case reaches court, DDAs Dekker and Rubirosa attempt to hit a third strike on the accused, after his previous convictions for murder. However, after the case falls flat due to circumstantial evidence, DA Hardin attempts to win the third strike at all costs by attempting to prosecute the robber for the theft of a stolen bike. Dekker must fight his conscience as to whether or not to give the accused life without parole for a stolen bike.
14	"Runyon Canyon"	Roger Young	Michael S. Chernuchin	May 9, 2011	01021	5.06
Detectives Morales and Jaruszalski investigate when pre-med freshman Beth Garrett is found strangled to death in a public park in Runyon Canyon. They discover that hours prior to the killing, Beth had engaged in sexual activity with two of her co-pupils in a disused mansion just outside the canyon. When the two suspects deny all involvement in the murder, the innocence of Beth's best friend is called into question, as she also appears to have been at the mansion on the night of Beth's death. A trail is soon discovered, and all three suspects admit to raping Beth, but all claim that Beth managed to escape and that none of them are guilty of murder. When the investigation leads to a local pedophile with past convictions of picking up and assaulting girls, DDAs Dekker and Rubirosa are forced to change their strategy when game-changing evidence is discovered at the last minute. A confession from a suspect who managed to stay under the police's radar becomes the only hope to turn the case around.
15	"Hayden Tract"	René Balcer	René Balcer	May 16, 2011	01022	4.36
Detectives Morales and Jaruszalski investigate when crazed gunman Larry Shepard opens fire during a rally with State Senator Celeste Kelman. During the incident, seven innocent people are murdered in cold blood. With the help of modern technology, the detectives manage to identify a solid lead and possible motive for the shooting. They discover that Shepard believed that Kelman had kidnapped his daughter Ariel, and that by murdering her, would find Ariel alive and well. However, it is soon discovered that Ariel is, in fact, a fictional character from a video game that Shepard believed was real. Morales soon becomes concerned when Jaruszalksi disappears without trace, and unknown to him, has, in fact, traveled to Mexico in an attempt to find his partner Rex Winters' killer. DDAs Dekker and Rubirosa struggle to reach an agreement after they have a row over how to handle the case.: This episode was originally intended to be the season finale. Inspired by the 2011 Tucson, AZ shooting, Tucson's NBC affiliate KVOA chose not to air the episode during prime time.
16	"Big Rock Mesa"	Helen Shaver	Julie Martin	May 23, 2011	01017	5.91
Detectives Morales and Jaruszalski investigate when a destructive wildfire rips through the hills of Malibu. In the midst of the fire, they discover three bodies which prior to their roasting in the fire, had suffered some form of severe trauma which resulted in their deaths. However, leads soon come thin on the ground when it is discovered that at the time of their death, the area where they were found had been evacuated due to an impending smoke and dust cloud. The case leads to three neighbors who had previously had problems with occupants of a local homeless shelter, who had attempted to enter their houses to find food and clean water. All three defendants soon corroborate each others story - but a missing murder weapon threatens to throw the whole case into disarray. DDAs Dekker and Rubirosa stumble upon some information crucial to the case, and realize that one of the accused can be tried for more than a manslaughter charge.
17	"Angel's Knoll"	Vincent Misiano	Peter Blauner	May 25, 2011	01020	5.47
Detectives Morales and Jaruszalski investigate when casino worker George Patrick is found murdered in his hotel bathroom after a heated argument with his cousin. They discover that his wife and long term partner, Christine, had been stealing money from his casino in order to fund other relationship-based robberies, thus allowing her to elope to New York with her partner in crime. However, it soon appears that the accused are just part of a much bigger scam being committed. In an attempt to convict the real mastermind, DDAs Dekker and Rubirosa reluctantly strike a deal with those involved. But just as they do so, the accused's criminal lawyer accuses Detective Morales of obtaining a confession through intimidation. With Morales suspended over his conduct, it becomes up to Jaruszalski to clear his partner's name and discover who exactly is prompting the witnesses to lie in court.: This episode marks the last appearance of Alana de la Garza as DDA Connie Rubirosa.
18	"Plummer Park"	Milan Cheylov	René Balcer	May 30, 2011	01011	6.59
Detectives Winters and Jaruszalski investigate when a father of two is found viciously murdered in his bathtub. The investigation leads to a theory that the two men shot by two police officers on arrival at the victim's house were kidnappers attempting to extort money from the victim's rich Russian relatives. The detectives soon discover that the two dead kidnappers are part of a four-man ring who have traveled over from Moscow to commit a series of similar crimes. As evidence relating to another kidnapping comes to light, the detectives must attempt to find the other victim before she is murdered as well. The detectives speak to the woman's husband and daughter (Skyler Day) who gives them a video the kidnappers had skyped them. As the woman is found safe and well, the case is thrown into a totally new light when her husband's fingerprint matches a fingerprint belonging to a Russian spy who had previously infiltrated the White House some 10 years previously. DDAs Dekker and Stanton must act quickly to secure a conviction against the kidnappers before his main two witnesses are extradited to Russia by ICE for their part in the infiltration of the White House.: This episode marks the point when the series returns to cases investigated by Winters before his death.
19	"Carthay Circle"	Rod Holcomb	Debra J. Fisher	June 6, 2011	01010	6.35
Detectives Winters and Jaruszalski investigate when a Korean woman is found dead by her neighbor. They immediately suspect her boyfriend of the murder after his credit card was used to book a one way train ticket, and his wallet is found in a dumpster just seconds from the train station. However, the detectives make a startling discovery when the boyfriend's body is found beneath his house, killed in a similar fashion to the first victim. The case leads to Prop 128, a ballot which the second victim was campaigning to pass, regarding gay marriage being legal in Los Angeles. The detectives discover that the second victim had come across some irregularities in the voting petitions - which in fact, turned out to be falsified signatures - and that he had been killed under instruction of the ballot's leader, Alan Coregon. DDAs Morales and Price must decide whether to prosecute the murderer or catch Coregon for fraud. DA Hardin urges Morales to strike a deal with both defendants - but to his dismay, Morales attempts to cut a deal on his own terms.
20	"El Sereno"	Jean de Segonzac	Peter Blauner	June 20, 2011	01012	6.05
Detectives Winters and Jaruszalski investigate when a shooting spree at a mortgage office results in multiple deaths. They immediately suspect three workers who were absent from the office that afternoon, however, it soon becomes clear which one is the culprit. When the case reaches court, DDAs Dekker and Stanton have to face up to the defendant's lawyer who claims that the whole case was based around racial profiling, as his client is the only African-American employee of the company. Just as the attorneys are about to dismiss his claim, an edited video of Lieutenant Gonzalez is posted on the internet, claiming that she is motivated by prosecuting black offenders. Dekker reaches out to DDA Morales for help in dismissing the accusations against Gonzalez - but in order to secure a prosecution, must find a copy of the original unedited video to present to the jury.
21	"Van Nuys"	Vincent Misiano	Julie Martin	June 27, 2011	01013	6.45
Detectives Winters and Jaruszalski investigate when five people are brutally murdered at a birthday party. They discover that a stash of drugs found in a cupboard at the venue of the party may suggest the motive for the killings - but after some investigation, believe that a case of mistaken identity may have resulted in several innocent people losing their lives. They discover that the drugs in question were stolen from a house in Palm Springs just four weeks earlier — and the killers who were looking for the drugs believed the occupants of the household were the thieves — however, it is soon uncovered that the drugs were planted to frame the occupants. DDAs Morales and Price are forced to ask DDA Dekker's help to convict the culprit (Bob Saget). But when the case reaches court, Dekker is surprised when the defendant submits a claim of not guilty by reason of insanity.
22	"Westwood"	Christine Moore	Julie Martin	July 11, 2011	01009	4.70
Detectives Winters and Jaruszalski investigate when student Javier Gomez is found murdered on the UCLA campus. They discover that Javi had been on the trail of a private investigator who had been snooping around his sister on the instruction of her boyfriend's father. As such, her boyfriend's father comes under suspicion for Javi's murder — but just as he is about to stand trial, he is found murdered in his drive. Javi's father immediately admits to the murder — but claims he acted in self-defense after the victim hit him with a shovel. However, a ballistics report fails to corroborate his story, and as such, DDAs Morales and Price must establish whether the accused is lying or another party is guilty of murder. With a witness who has lied on the stand, a father who is overprotective of his daughter, and more than one account of events, Morales must uncover the truth before it is too late.

== Video game ==
Telltale Games was originally set to develop a Law & Order: LA video game due for release in 2011. However, due to the cancellation of the show, Telltale Games decided to make another game set in the Law & Order universe called Law & Order: Legacies.

== Home media ==
On September 20, 2011, Universal Pictures Home Entertainment released Law & Order: Los Angeles – The Complete Series on DVD in Region 1.

== Reception ==
=== U.S. television ratings ===
Law & Order: LA aired on Monday nights, following The Event.

The debut of Law & Order: LA did fairly well, bringing in 10.6 million viewers and averaging a 3.2 rating with viewers ages 18–49. That was enough to dominate the 10 p.m. slot, and give NBC its biggest show of the week so far, and improve the network's time slot average by 63 percent versus last season. Although when it returned revamped on Monday night on April 11, 2011 back-to-back, the episodes together averaged 6.10 million viewers with a 1.5/4% rating with viewers ages 18–49.

Season	Episodes	Timeslot (EST)	Season premiere	Season finale	TV season	Ranking	Viewers (in millions)
Season 1	22	Wednesday 10:00 p.m. (2010); Monday 10:00 p.m. (2011)	September 29, 2010	July 11, 2011	2010–2011	#59	7.74

=== Awards and honors ===
Year	Group	Award	Result	Recipient(s)
2011	NAACP Image Award	Outstanding Supporting Actor in a Drama Series	Won	Terrence Howard
2011	Young Artist Award	Best Performance in a TV Series; Guest Starring, Young Actor 18-21	Nominated	Hutch Dano "Playa Vista"
2011	Imagen Award	Best Primetime Television Program	Won	—N/a
2011	Imagen Award	Best Actress/Television	Nominated	Alana de la Garza
2011	People's Choice Award	Favorite New TV Drama	Nominated	—N/a
