= Steven Zirnkilton =

American voice actor and politician (born 1958)

Member of the Maine House of Representatives from the 124th District
- In office 1985–1988
- In office 1993–1994

Member of the Maine House of Representatives from the 43rd District
- In office 1983–1984

Personal details
- Born: Stephen Morgan Zirnkilton; August 18, 1958 (age 68) York, Pennsylvania, U.S.
- Party: Republican
- Spouse: Stephanie Zirnkilton
- Children: 2
- Education: New England College (BA)
- Occupation: Voice actor; former politician
- Known for: Narrator of Law & Order franchise

Steven Zirnkilton or Steve Zirnkilton (born Stephen Morgan Zirnkilton; August 18, 1958) is an American voice actor and former politician from Maine. Zirnkilton is best known for providing the opening narration of all American television series in the Law & Order franchise.

== Early life and education ==
Zirnkilton grew up in York, Pennsylvania and spent summers in Maine. He graduated from New England College and began working for radio station WDEA in Ellsworth, Maine upon graduation. He later settled in Seal Harbor, Maine. Zirnkilton received a Legislative Sentiment for his work from Maine State Representative Chris Greeley.

== Career ==
=== Politics ===
Zirnkilton, a Republican, served for eight years (four terms) in the Maine House of Representatives from 1983 to 1988 and again from 1992 to 1994. He represented part of Hancock County, Maine, including his residence in the village of Seal Harbor in the town Mount Desert. Serving in the 43rd District from 1983 to 1984 and then the 124th from 1985 to 1988 and then again from 1993 to 1994. During his final term in the House of Representatives, Zirnkilton served in leadership as Assistant Minority Leader. In 1994, when then-Congresswoman Olympia Snowe decided not to seek re-election to the U.S. House of Representatives for Maine's 2nd congressional district, Zirnkilton sought to replace her. Zirnkilton lost the primary to fellow State Representative Rick Bennett, who eventually lost the general election to State Senator John Baldacci.

Zirnkilton also provides voiceovers for political ads, notably during Susan Collins's re-election campaign in 2014.

=== Acting ===
Zirnkilton is known for providing the opening narration of all American shows in the Law & Order franchise. He was hired by series creator Dick Wolf and appeared in a pilot episode of the series. Zirnkilton has also provided voices for Family Guy and The Rugrats Movie. He was a narrator for Faith Rewarded: The Historic Season of the 2004 Boston Red Sox. Zirnkilton narrated Ruby Ridge: Anatomy of a Tragedy on Investigation Discovery. He also provided the voice-over for a Sky One advertisement for the channel's Law & Order airings. Zirnkilton was the narrator for TLC's Code Blue: New Orleans and the syndicated series Arrest & Trial. Currently he narrates Blood & Money on Oxygen and CNBC. He has also been the announcer for the Kennedy Center Honors, and for the past twenty-three years he has been the onstage announcer for the Top Cops Awards in Washington, D.C.

== Filmography ==
=== Film ===
Year	Title	Role	Notes
1998	The Rugrats Movie	Reporter	Voice
2004	Law & Order: The First 3 Years	Opening Narrator	DVD bonus feature
2004	Faith Rewarded: The Historic Season of the 2004 Boston Red Sox	Narrator	Documentary
2004	Ruby Ridge	Narrator	Documentary
2008	The Stag Hunt	Narrator	Short
2013	Summer Colony	Narrator	Short
2015	Toy Soldier	Voice	
2016	Too Cold to Swim	Motel Clerk	

=== Television ===
Year	Title	Role	Notes
1990–present	Law & Order	Narrator	Contract role
1997	Duckman	Opening Narrator	Voice, episode: "Das Sub"
1999–present	Law & Order: Special Victims Unit	Opening Narrator	Contract role
2000–2001	Arrest & Trial	Narrator	TV series documentary/nontraditional court show
2000–2002	Code Blue: New Orleans	Narrator	TV series documentary
2001–2011	Law & Order: Criminal Intent	Opening Narrator	Contract role
2002–2004	Crime & Punishment	Narrator	TV series documentary/nontraditional court show
2003	Dragnet	Narrator	Episode: "The Silver Slayer"
2004	The Tonight Show with Jay Leno	Voice	Episode: "Episode #12.209"
2005	Family Guy	Opening Narrator	Voice, episode: "Fast Times at Buddy Cianci Jr. High"
2005–2006	Law & Order: Trial by Jury	Opening Narrator	Contract role
2010–2011	Law & Order: Los Angeles	Opening Narrator	Contract role
2017	Inside the FBI: New York	Narrator	Documentary series; 6 episodes
2021–2025	Law & Order: Organized Crime	Opening Narrator	Contract role
2022	Murderville	Opening Narrator	Contract role
2023	Blood & Money	Narrator	Contract role
2024–present	Law & Order Toronto: Criminal Intent	Opening Narrator	Contract role
