= Zuma and Trancas Canyons =

- Location within California Location within the United States
- Nearest city: Malibu, California
- Coordinates: 34.04°N 118.815°W
- Governing body: National Park Service

Zuma and Trancas Canyons are an area of Federal parkland to the west of Malibu, California. It lies within the Santa Monica Mountains National Recreation Area and is the largest piece of Federal parkland in the NRA. Zuma Canyon contains a number of trails for hikers, of varying severity, and is the home of a range of wildlife, including the wrentit, known as the "Voice of the Chaparral". The park's eastern boundary is marked by Kanan Dume Road (county route N-9) and the north end of the parkland is crossed by the Backbone Trail, a 67 miles (108 km) pathway through the Santa Monica Mountains.The name zuma is derived from a Chumash word meaning "abundance".
