= Wanda De Jesus =

American actress (born 1958)

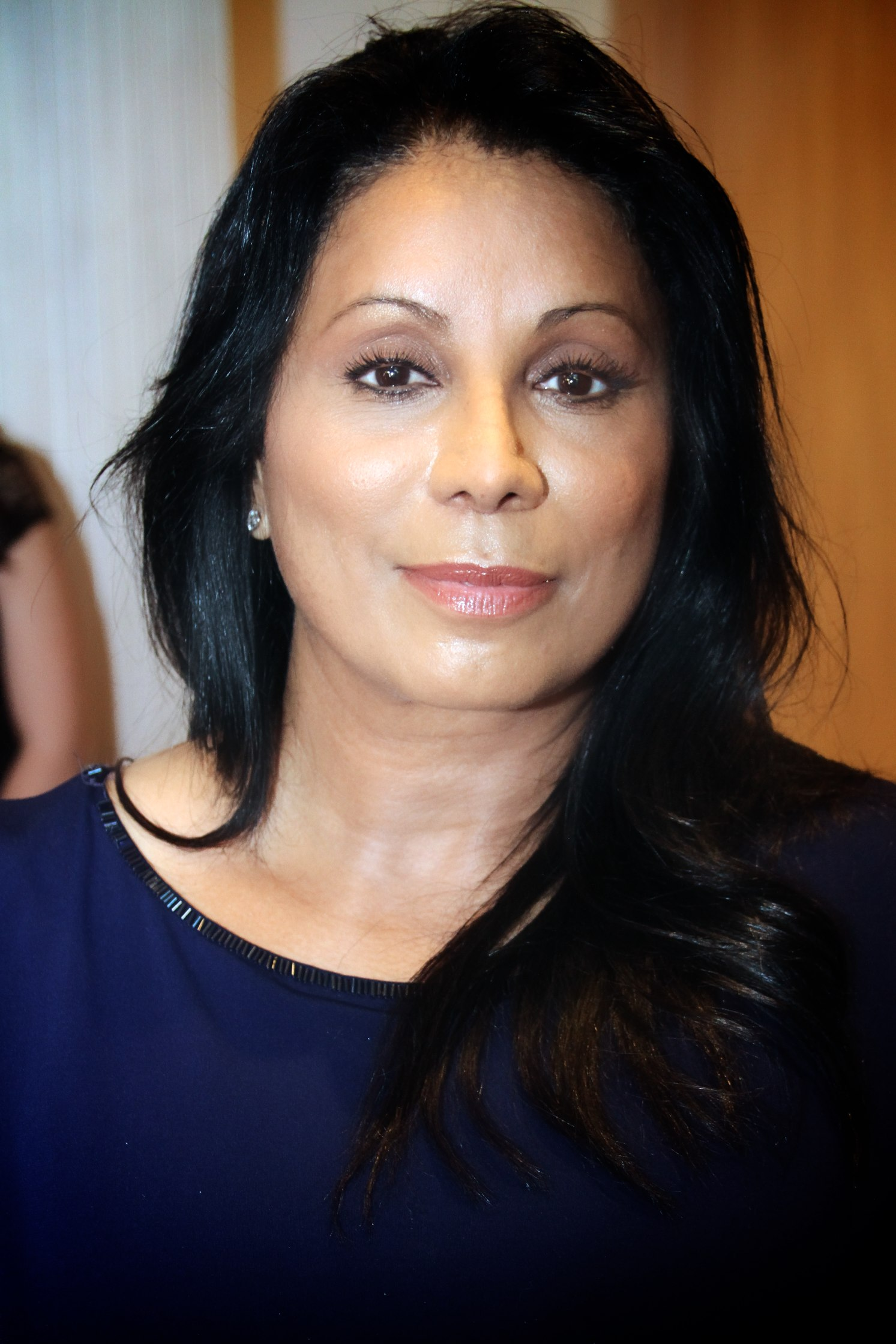
- De Jesus at the 2013 Imagen Awards
- Born: August 26, 1958 (age 68); New York City, U.S.
- Occupation: Actress
- Years active: 1986–present
- Partner: Jimmy Smits (1986–present)

Wanda De Jesus (born August 26, 1958) is an American character actress.

== Early life ==
De Jesus was born and raised in the Little Italy neighborhood of Lower Manhattan, New York City, the daughter of parents who came to New York from Puerto Rico. She attended the High School of Performing Arts and earned a degree in performing arts in 1981 from the City College of New York.

== Career ==
In 1986, De Jesus made both her stage and television debuts: starring opposite Robert De Niro in the Broadway play Cuba and His Teddy Bear and playing a recurring role on the NBC daytime soap opera Another World. In 1987, De Jesus starred in the short-lived ABC prison drama series, Mariah. She later made guest starring appearances on L.A. Law, Tales from the Darkside and Matlock.

In 1990, De Jesus had supporting roles in the action comedy film Downtown and the science fiction film RoboCop 2. She was the fourth actress to portray Santana Andrade in the NBC soap opera Santa Barbara from 1991 to 1992. In 1994 she returned to the big screen, starring in the crime drama The Glass Shield, and appeared alongside Jimmy Smits in Death and the Maiden at the Mark Taper Forum. The following year she was a regular cast member in the short-lived drama series Live Shot. She guest-starred on Babylon 5, Touched by an Angel, NYPD Blue and Nash Bridges. She later appeared in films The Insider (1999), Flawless (1999), Once in the Life (2000) and Ghosts of Mars (2001). In 2002, De Jesus starred opposite Clint Eastwood in the mystery thriller film Blood Work playing Graciella Rivers, a Latino woman still enraged over the murder of her sister. From 2002 to 2003, she had a recurring role on the CBS crime series CSI: Miami as MDPD Detective Adelle Sevilla. In 2007, De Jesus starred in the crime drama film, Illegal Tender.

In 2010, De Jesus had a recurring role as Iris Blanco, the mayor of Pine Valley in the ABC soap opera, All My Children. Later in 2010, De Jesus was cast as the head of the police squad on the NBC series Law & Order: Los Angeles, but the role – which had already been changed significantly before De Jesus joined – was changed again and reshot with a different actress after two episodes had been filmed. In 2012, she had a recurring role in the FX crime drama series, Sons of Anarchy. In 2022, she had a recurring role in the Paramount+ psychological thriller Fatal Attraction.

== Personal life ==
De Jesus has been in a relationship with actor Jimmy Smits since 1986. They live together in Los Angeles.

== Filmography ==
=== Film ===
Year	Title	Role	Notes
1990	Downtown	Luisa Diaz	
1990	RoboCop 2	Estevez	
1994	The Glass Shield	Carmen Munoz	
1995	Captain Nuke and the Bomber Boys	Leslie Moore	
1997	Executive Power	Debra Skelly	Video
1999	Time to Pay	Magdalena Scanlon	Video
1999	Flawless	Karen	
2000	Once in the Life	Jackie	
2001	Ghosts of Mars	Akooshay	
2002	Blood Work	Graciella Rivers	
2007	Illegal Tender	Millie De Leon	
2009	The Ministers	Capt. Diaz	
2013	Water & Power	Officer Siler	

=== Television ===
Year	Title	Role	Notes
1986	Another World	Gomez	TV series
1987	Mariah	Leda Cervantes	Regular role
1987	L.A. Law	Ms. Santiago	"The Wizard of Odds"
1988	The Pursuit of Happiness	Mrs. Lopez	"That Pair of Eyes"
1988	Tales from the Darkside	Telephone (voice)	"Payment Overdue"
1990	Singer & Sons	Mary Garza	"Our's Not to Reason Why Shmy"
1990	Lucky Chances	Suzita	TV miniseries
1990	Lifestories	Dr. Duran	"Frank Brody"
1990	Matlock	Alana Leon	"The Fighter"
1991	Equal Justice	Suzanne Garner	"Opening Farewell"
1991	Fatal Friendship	Darlene	TV film
1991–1992	Santa Barbara	Santana Andrade	Main role
1992	Civil Wars	Linda Rodriguez	"Tape Fear"
1995	Babylon 5	Sarah	"Hunter, Prey"
1995	SeaQuest DSV	Comm. Pamela Lopez	"Chains of Command"
1995	Live Shot	Liz Vega	Regular role
1996	Touched by an Angel	Sue Cheney	"Jacob's Ladder"
1996	NYPD Blue	Det. Martina Escobar	"Girl Talk"
1996	Spider-Man: The Animated Series	Dr. Sylvia Lopez (voice)	"Sins of the Fathers Chapter 12: The Spot"
1996	Diagnosis: Murder	Det. Emma Lopez	"Murder in the Family"
1996	Profiler	Catherine Evers	"Cruel and Unusual"
1997	Happily Ever After: Fairy Tales for Every Child	Xochitl (voice)	"The Shoemaker and the Elves"
1997	Gold Coast	Vivian Onzola	TV film
1997	Brooklyn South	Det. Marina McConnell	"A Reverend Runs Through It"
1997	Nash Bridges	Agent Janet Reynolds	"Bombshell"
1998	Vengeance Unlimited	District Atty. Rosalie Hanson	"Dishonorable Discharge"
1999	Promised Land	Nina Charles	"Finale"
2000	Pensacola: Wings of Gold	Ali	"At Poverty Level"
2002	Almost a Woman	Mami	TV film
2002	Thieves	Katrina Epstein	"The Green and the Black", "Home Is Where the Heist Is"
2002–2003	CSI: Miami	Det. Adell Sevilla	Recurring role
2005	Detective	Sanchez	TV film
2010	Law & Order: LA	Lt. Arleen Gonzalez	"Hollywood"
2010	All My Children	Iris Blanco	Recurring role
2012	Sons of Anarchy	Carla	Recurring role
2013	Blue	Cynthia	"Everything Is a Test"
2015	Letter Never Sent	Edith	TV film
2020	Gentefied	Delfina	Recurring Role
2023	Fatal Attraction	Marcella Levya	Recurring Role

== Awards and nominations ==
Year	Group	Award	Result	Film/Show
1996	NCLR Bravo Award	Outstanding Actress in a Drama Series	Nominated	Live Shot
2003	Imagen Award	Best Actress in a Television Film	Won	Almost a Woman
2007	Imagen Award	Best Actress in a Film	Nominated	Illegal Tender
