= Law & Order: Special Victims Unit season 19 =

Season of American television series

Law & Order: Special Victims Unit
- Season 19
- Season 19 U.S. DVD cover
- Starring: Mariska Hargitay; Kelli Giddish; Ice-T; Peter Scanavino; Raúl Esparza; Philip Winchester
- No. of episodes: 24

Release
- Original network: NBC
- Original release: September 27, 2017 – May 23, 2018

Season chronology
- ← Previous; Season 18 Next → Season 20

The nineteenth season of Law & Order: Special Victims Unit premiered on September 27, 2017 and finished on May 23, 2018 with a two-part season finale. Michael S. Chernuchin, who had previously worked on Law & Order, Law & Order: Criminal Intent, and Chicago Justice took over from Rick Eid as showrunner. This is also the first season since season twelve in 2010–2011 where another Law & Order series—Law & Order True Crime: The Menendez Murders—aired alongside SVU on NBC.

== Production ==
Law & Order: Special Victims Unit was renewed for a 19th season on May 12, 2017. Chernuchin took over from Eid as showrunner after Eid left SVU to be showrunner for the fifth season of Chicago P.D. Production on the season started on July 20, 2017. On January 9, 2018, NBC ordered an extra two episodes for Season 19, as confirmed in a tweet by Robert Brooks Cohen, rounding the episode count to 24.

=== Storylines ===
Chernuchin told The Hollywood Reporter that this season of SVU would involve more ripped-from-the-headlines plots focusing on current events such as the Charlottesville riots. "Conflict. It's just the state of the world today with everybody," he said. "Everybody's political now and everything is political now, and we want to deal with that."

THR's Kate Stanhope also asked Chernuchin about the pulled episode ("Unstoppable") from the previous season, asking him if he was hesitant about diving into politics. Chernuchin replied, "I'm not going to choose a side. I won't choose a side. I'm going to present both political views and let the audience decide which one is right. My goal, and I told the writers on this on the first day of our writers' room, is at the end of every episode, I want half the audience to throw their shoes at the television and the other half to stand up and cheer."

Chernuchin told THR that another episode would be based on the Charlie Gard case, an infant in England who was born with a rare genetic disorder that causes progressive brain damage and muscle failure. "That's a life-and-death story," Chernuchin explained. Other episodes were alluded to as "[SVU's] answer to 13 Reasons Why — and an airplane episode covering "all the turmoil on airplanes these days." Chernuchin concluded, "We are ripping things from the headlines. Some of them are big, famous headlines and some of them are smaller headlines."

On September 8, 2017, Chernuchin gave an overview of the season premiere and outlook on the season as a whole to TV Line; noting that ADA Barba (Raúl Esparza) would start having other problems than court battles when Peter Stone (Philip Winchester) shows up, pushing Barba into "a huge moral decision." Chernuchin also teased that Lieutenant Benson's life would be getting worse before it gets any better. "What I told Mariska [Hargitay] when I came aboard is, 'You're a broken woman, because of your past, and I'm going to drag you through the woods and you're gonna come out the other side a better person," he previewed. "So we're gonna throw the kitchen sink at her [Benson]."

He also mentioned there's a possibility of romance for Benson: "There might be, she's not looking for it, but it might happen." In an interview with E! News, Kelli Giddish (Det. Amanda Rollins) said a change in Benson and Rollins' relationship dynamic was coming. "I'm so looking forward to developing a friendship with Benson, the Rollins and Benson relationship, because they have so much in common." Benson and Rollins' relationship was rocky, most notably between seasons 15 and 18 as the former began moving up the ranks to sergeant and then lieutenant. "They have been at odds, it's just nice to come into that office and know that we're not going to fight but kind of support each other as I think these two characters would in real life," Giddish continued.

An episode based on the Harvey Weinstein sexual abuse allegations aired on January 17, 2018. "We are hitting Harvey Weinstein head-on, but it's not in the realm of the entertainment business," Chernuchin said in an interview with Entertainment Weekly. "It's a real important episode about the rape culture in an industry, and we wanted to try [to] stretch the law to criminalize that sort of environment."

== Cast ==
The entire main cast from the previous season returned. In August 2017, it was announced that Philip Winchester would reprise his role as Assistant State's Attorney Peter Stone from Chicago Justice, appearing around the midpoint of the season. New show runner/executive producer Michael Chernuchin told Entertainment Weekly that Stone's character would be coming in as an antagonist and that he would be a foil for A.D.A. Barba (Raúl Esparza) this season, but that Stone's character wasn't necessarily taking his [Barba's] job. "There's more than one A.D.A. in New York [...] Philip will come in and he won't be the nicest person our characters have ever met. What he's going to be doing, too, is basically bringing all of the franchises into one. He's connecting Law & Order, the Chicago franchises and now SVU." His character debuted in the thirteenth episode of the season. In the thirteenth episode, Raúl Esparza departed the cast after six seasons on the show. He told Natalie Abrams of Entertainment Weekly that it was his decision to leave, adding "I've done six seasons, I felt like it was time to go. I had explored a lot of what I thought Barba was about. I just felt it was time to move on." Philip Winchester took his place as the show's permanent A.D.A, guest starring in Esparza's final episode before joining the main cast in the fourteenth episode.

=== Main ===
- Mariska Hargitay as Lieutenant Olivia Benson
- Kelli Giddish as Junior Detective Amanda Rollins
- Ice-T as Senior Detective / Sergeant Odafin "Fin" Tutuola
- Peter Scanavino as Junior Detective Dominick "Sonny" Carisi, Jr.
- Raúl Esparza as Assistant District Attorney Rafael Barba (episodes 1–13)
- Philip Winchester as Assistant District Attorney Peter Stone (episodes 14–24)

=== Special guest stars after their departure ===
- Stephanie March as Alexandra Cabot
- Tamara Tunie as Medical Examiner Melinda Warner

=== Crossover stars from Law & Order ===
- Sam Waterston as District Attorney Jack McCoy
- Carolyn McCormick as Dr. Elizabeth Olivet

=== Recurring ===
- Alan Ariano as Judge Lee Wong
- Ami Brabson as Judge Karyn Blake
- Ryan Buggle as Noah Porter-Benson
- Charlotte Cabell and Vivian Cabell as Jesse Rollins
- Erica Camarano as Officer Rachel Ortiz
- Helmar Augustus Cooper as Judge Reginald Flowers
- Vincent Curatola as Judge Al Burtuccio
- Ned Eisenberg as Defense Attorney Roger Kressler
- Eric Elizaga as Dr. Stephen Hale
- Susie Essman as Defense Attorney Arlene Heller
- Peter Gallagher as Deputy Chief William Dodds
- Gillian Glasco as Officer Dominique Rivers
- Joe Grifasi as Judge Hashi Horowitz
- Eddie Hargitay as Officer Eddie Montero
- Peter Hermann as Defense Attorney Trevor Langan
- Mary Hodges as Judge Anita Wright
- Jayne Houdyshell as Judge Ruth Linden
- Peter Jacobson as Defense Attorney Randy Dworkin
- Kathryn Kates as Judge Marleen Simons
- Yvonna Kopacz-Wright as Dr. Darcy Wilder
- Amy Korb as Pamela Stone
- Sonia Manzano as Judge Gloria Pepitone
- Michael Mastro as Judge Serani
- Olga Merediz as Judge Roberta Martinez
- Barbara Miluski as Judge Lisa Peck
- Maureen Mueller as Counselor Susan Janet
- Lauren Noble as Carmen
- Steve Rosen as Defence Attorney Michael Guthrie
- John Rothman as Judge Edward Kofax
- Brooke Shields as Sheila Porter
- Sarah Stephens as Officer Selena Gaines
- Jenna Stern as Judge Elana Barth
- Callie Thorne as Defense Attorney Nicki Staines
- Bjorn Thorstad as Defense Attorney Mitch Jackson
- Tom Titone as Judge Joshua Goldfarb
- Ernest Waddell as Ken Randall
- Dean Winters as District Attorney Investigator Brian Cassidy

=== Guest stars ===
On August 11, 2017, it was announced by The Hollywood Reporter that actress Brooke Shields would play a 'major' recurring role throughout the course of the season. "I play a very different character from any I have ever played," Shields commented. "I'm excited to stir the SVU pot a bit." THR noted that details of her role are being kept under wraps, although it's been teased that Shields' role will "shake up Benson's (Mariska Hargitay) world." At the New York Fashion Week event on September 7, 2017, Shields talked about her "complicated" character; "We're discovering the character," she said of her at the time, mysterious recurring role, "it's pretty complicated and it's gut wrenching. What's so amazing about the show is that the characters are so rich and layered, and they're just filtering me through it." Shields also noted that her character was set to begin appearing in the third episode ("Contrapasso") of the season. In that episode's last scene, Shields' character was revealed to be Noah's previously unknown grandmother, Sheila Porter, who challenged Benson for custody before becoming friends. Her story arc finished in January 2018 when Sheila abducted Noah in a cliffhanger episode, before being caught by Benson and the squad and arrested.

On August 18, Entertainment Weekly released a sneak peek of the script of SVU's season 19 premiere episode and announced that Will Chase would be guest starring as Byron Marks, an accused rapist who turned fugitive when he fled to Cuba six years prior; he had established a new life there with his wife Elana Marks, played by Mariela Garriga, and their little daughter. He is caught by Fin (Ice T) in the premiere's opening scenes. Amy Smart guest starred as one of Marks' victims, and Peter Jacobson – who previously guest starred in the thirteenth-season finale and recurred in season fourteen as a pimp named Bart Ganzel – guest starred in the premiere as his recurring mothership Law & Order character, Defense Attorney Randy Dworkin, a character created by Michael Chernuchin during his tenure on L&O. Annabeth Gish guest starred in the third episode of the season. She portrayed a defense attorney in a case where a man is castrated and left for dead, leading the SVU squad to three female suspects with possible motives. Cleveland Cavaliers point guard Isaiah Thomas made a cameo appearance as himself in an October episode ("Complicated") of SVU. Thomas' cameo appearance occurs in the midst of a missing persons investigation.

Mike Faist, a Tony Award-nominated actor starring as Connor Murphy in Broadway musical Dear Evan Hansen, guest starred as a young man struggling with the long-ago disappearance of his sister in "Complicated". The Walking Dead alum Brighton Sharbino guest starred as a teenager who disappears when her classmates make her the subject of a cyberbullying attack. Madison Pettis also guest starred in the episode, titled "No Good Reason", which aired on NBC, October 18, 2017. Another Broadway star, Christiane Noll, guest starred in the episode "Unintended Consequences" as Sarah Curtis "After 19 years on the air, I will finally be appearing as a guest star on episode #19006 of Law & Order: SVU! I am really excited because this is my first big guest starring role," Noll told Playbill. Peter Scolari guest starred along with Noll in "Unintended Consequences" as Dr. Dennis Barkley. In October 2017, THR announced Melora Walters and Joanna Going would guest star in a special episode of SVU ("Something Happened"). Walters played the rape victim, Laurel Linwood, who knows she was raped but can't remember what happened. Going played Laurel's sister, Leah, who is brought in to help fill in the blanks.

On September 20, 2017, it was announced Sam Waterston would guest star in an upcoming episode of SVU as his Law & Order character, Jack McCoy. Waterston was re-united with show runner/EP Michael S. Chernuchin, who also held the same position at the time Waterston joined the original series in 1994. This also marked Waterston's fourth guest appearance on SVU. In the episode "Pathological", Tamara Tunie (M.E. Melinda Warner), Carolyn McCormick (Dr. Elizabeth Olivet), and Jenna Stern (Judge Elana Barth) returned as their respective characters. The episode aired on January 10, 2018. McCormick also guest starred in the season finale.

On December 14, 2017, Martin Donovan and Yasmine Al Massri were confirmed to guest star in an episode titled "Flight Risk" based on the Harvey Weinstein sexual abuse allegations. The episode was about sexual assault in the airline industry and aired on January 17, 2018.

On January 31, 2018, Rhea Seehorn guest starred in an episode titled "Info Wars", inspired by the Charlottesville riots and the website InfoWars. Rhea's character was inspired by InfoWars reporter Millie Weaver.

On March 5, 2018, it was revealed that Stephanie March would reprise her role as ADA Alexandra Cabot in an episode titled "Sunk Cost Fallacy" that aired on April 18, 2018. It marked March's first appearance on the show since season thirteen.

== Episodes ==
Law & Order: Special Victims Unit season 19 episodes
No. overall	No. in season	Title	Directed by	Written by	Original release date	Prod. code	U.S. viewers (millions)
411	1	"Gone Fishin'"	Alex Chapple	Michael Chernuchin	September 27, 2017	1901	5.67
The Special Victims Unit is notified about a fugitive rapist (Will Chase) on the loose in Havana, Cuba. Fin crosses international borders to capture him, which soon causes political controversy when Fin is accused of kidnapping the perp. When all of his victims are reluctant to testify, Benson must count on one victim (Amy Smart) to help put the perp away. Meanwhile, Benson discovers shocking allegations made about her, which eventually leads to her ex-boyfriend and former SVU detective Brian Cassidy returning to her life to investigate her actions and the allegation made against her.
412	2	"Mood"	Michael Pressman	Allison Intrieri	October 4, 2017	1902	5.82
A woman (Saxon Sharbino) reports to the Special Victims Unit that she was raped. At first, the detectives believe her but, after several misleading reports, the detectives soon find themselves in a complicated position, with Rollins and Carisi fighting about whether her story is true and whether the case should be taken to trial. Meanwhile, Cassidy continues his investigation into Benson's personal life regarding the shocking allegations made about her and Benson decides to take action, leading to an extremely shocking discovery and the loss of an old friendship in Benson's life.
413	3	"Contrapasso"	Jean de Segonzac	Richard Sweren	October 11, 2017	1903	5.79
A man (Paul Fitzgerald) is brutally castrated and left for dead in a hotel, but survives the ordeal and the Special Victims Unit soon discover there were three witnesses to the scene, who immediately become suspects in the case. However, the case quickly takes a bizarre twist when the three witnesses make a claim that they are victims from something he did in the past and they were getting revenge. Barba must decide whether to prosecute the women or defend them in the complicated case. Meanwhile, Olivia gets shocking news from Trevor Langan regarding Noah's biological family, revealing that Noah's mother Ellie Porter had been lying about something all this time during the past investigation.
414	4	"No Good Reason"	Martha Mitchell	Julie Martin & Brianna Yellen	October 18, 2017	1904	5.58
The Special Victims Unit is called in to investigate the sudden disappearance of a high school student (Brighton Sharbino). They soon discover that she was the victim of a nasty cyberbullying attack from her fellow peers and best friend (Madison Pettis). When she is finally found, she claims that she was raped by three boys from her school at a party, one being one of her best friends. The case goes well until the victim becomes reluctant to testify due to hatred and bullying from her peers and Benson must convince her to be brave. Meanwhile, Sheila Porter attempts to challenge Benson's parenting skills as a mother, which infuriates Benson.: Episode inspired by the events in the Netflix web series 13 Reasons Why.
415	5	"Complicated"	Tricia Brock	Céline C. Robinson	October 25, 2017	1905	5.81
A young woman (Ili Ray) who has been missing for ten years is suddenly found and the cold case into her disappearance is reopened by the Special Victims Unit. However, the detectives become suspicious of her story when several things do not match up and the detectives soon discover a disturbing secret kept by the family. Meanwhile, Benson and Sheila fight against each other for custody of Noah with Sheila claiming she fears for Noah's safety due to Benson's recent allegations, infuriating Benson and putting them both in an intense and conflict-filled relationship.: Appearances by Isaiah Thomas and Mike Faist.
416	6	"Unintended Consequences"	Jonathan Herron	Elizabeth Rinehart	November 8, 2017	1906	4.97
The Special Victims Unit is called to a high end rehab center to investigate the death of a teenage girl after she was last seen there. Suspicious of the activity going on and the concerning behaviour by and reports from some of the clients, Rollins goes undercover in the rehab center as a worker, joining the manager (Anne Corley) in her duties in the hopes of obtaining evidence of criminal activity to get justice for the murder victim's family. Meanwhile, Benson tries to overcome her doubts about Sheila after letting her visit Noah for the first time and befriending her.
417	7	"Something Happened"	Alex Chapple	Michael Chernuchin	November 29, 2017	1907	7.07
A rape victim (Melora Walters) who cannot remember the details of what happened when she was sexually assaulted visits the Special Victims Unit, distraught and desperate to remember exactly what happened. Benson brings her into an interrogation room to help her remember the details. However, it quickly becomes intense when the rape victim starts to break down in fear, stress, and desperation. In order to help the victim remember, Benson finally decides to tell her a long kept secret from her past that she had not told anyone before in the hopes that the victim would remember what happened and who assaulted her so justice could be served. The case soon takes a shocking twist, revealing a secret long kept from both the victim and her sister (Joanna Going).
418	8	"Intent"	Adam Bernstein	Lawrence Kaplow & Robert Brooks Cohen	December 6, 2017	1908	6.18
The Special Victims Unit are called in after a popular social media star (Gage Golightly) is raped following a romantic date gone wrong. The detectives discover she posted a hint of who she was dating online for her followers, but the victim's reputation is soon questioned after a text threat is discovered that was subsequently sent to her suspected rapist which could ruin the case. Meanwhile, Rollins and Carisi get into a bar fight, and Benson sets firm ground rules with Sheila about what she can and cannot tell Noah about his past and family background. Olivia's worst nightmare comes true when she gets some horrifying news about Noah.
419	9	"Gone Baby Gone"	Jean de Segonzac	Lawrence Kaplow & Elizabeth Rinehart	January 3, 2018	1909	6.23
The Special Victims Unit, along with Deputy Chief William Dodds, starts a top-priority frantic search for Noah after he is kidnapped while clothes shopping with Sheila at the mall. Benson, frantic, starts to panic, sending emotions running high amongst the team members. Desperate to have her son safe and back with her, Benson decides to take matters into her own hands and tries to track down Noah's kidnapper, despite Dodds' orders. However, things eventually become extremely dangerous and Benson's life is soon put in serious peril as things take a shocking twist.
420	10	"Pathological"	Jono Oliver	Brianna Yellen	January 10, 2018	1910	6.06
The Special Victims Unit are called to investigate a sexual assault case involving two disabled children (Conor Tague and Erin Wilhelmi) who attend a special-needs school. Rollins discovers a shocking truth when one of the students' medical exams shows that the child's medical disability stems from a surprising source and the case soon turns into one of child abuse at the hands of the child's mother (Dendrie Taylor). The case soon goes from bad to worse when the abuse turns to murder. Meanwhile, Benson tries to help Noah cope with nightmares after the previous traumatizing events involving himself, Benson, and Sheila Porter.: Episode inspired by the murder of Dee Dee Blanchard
421	11	"Flight Risk"	Michael Pressman	Julie Martin & Allison Intrieri	January 17, 2018	1911	6.21
When a Muslim female pilot (Yasmine Al Massri) locks herself in the cockpit and attempts to return the plane to JFK Airport (nearly causing a crash), she finds herself arrested on suspicion of terrorism. However, when she makes a claim that the captain of the plane (Martin Donovan) was sexually assaulting her and she diverted the plane to avoid contact with him, the Special Victims Unit is called to investigate. Barba eventually convenes a grand jury to determine the suspected rapist's complicity in the crime. Meanwhile, Tutuola takes several steps to ensure that Benson is safe at work after the previous incident with Sheila Porter.: Episode inspired by the Harvey Weinstein sexual abuse allegations.
422	12	"Info Wars"	Michael Slovis	Richard Sweren & Robert Brooks Cohen	January 31, 2018	1912	5.48
The Special Victims Unit is called to a brutal crime scene after a violent protest in the city results in a controversial, right-wing female pundit (Rhea Seehorn) getting viciously sexually assaulted. However, with many people in the crowd during the protest, the squad has a hard time catching the victim's assailants. When the case is taken to trial, Barba and Benson fight with each other after struggling to keep their political opinions about the case quiet, which leaves the squad clashing over sides in the case and raises tension between the detectives and Barba.: Episode inspired by the Charlottesville riots (Unite the Right rally), as well as episode title inspired by actual website InfoWars, with specific main character reference to InfoWars' reporter Millie Weaver.
423	13	"The Undiscovered Country"	Alex Chapple	Michael Chernuchin	February 7, 2018	1913	6.64
The Special Victims Unit are called in to investigate after a father (Joe Tapper) kidnaps his mitochondrial DNA depletion syndrome-affected infant. When the father is found, he says he wants his son alive, whereas his wife (Abigail Hawk) wants him put out of his misery, which sends the SVU detectives taking sides in the family's right-to-die case. Barba's interference in the case leads to the entire DA's office being in jeopardy, which results in DA Jack McCoy getting involved and sending Barba to trial for murder. However, Barba is found not guilty. Traumatized by the case, Barba quits his job as an ADA and is replaced by former Chicago ASA Peter Stone (Philip Winchester), who has recently lost his father Benjamin Stone, a former ADA previously assigned to the NYPD's Homicide Unit.: Episode inspired by the Charlie Gard case.
424	14	"Chasing Demons"	Fred Berner	Richard Sweren & Allison Intrieri	February 28, 2018	1914	5.55
The Special Victims Unit takes a doctor (Lorenzo Scott) who has been accused of molesting little boys to trial. Brian Cassidy testifies but, when the doctor's lawyer (Daryl Edwards) suspects Cassidy of being racist, Cassidy loses it, which results in a mistrial. However, when Cassidy turns up to Benson's apartment with blood on him and Dr. West is found dead, Benson must decide if Cassidy is guilty of murder or if Cassidy is innocent as he claims, complicating Rollins' and Benson's relationship. Stone and Benson's relationship gets off to a rocky start, all while a determined Homicide detective (Kylie Bunbury) investigates Cassidy for murder.
425	15	"In Loco Parentis"	Norberto Barba	Michael Chernuchin & Julie Martin	March 7, 2018	1915	5.51
Carisi's sister visits saying that her daughter was raped. The Special Victims Unit investigates the case, but Carisi's niece claims she lied about the rape and the charges are dropped. However, when Carisi's niece claims that she really was raped after visiting the suspect, SVU must investigate whether she is being truthful given her damaged credibility. Meanwhile, during the investigation, ADA Stone learns the hard way that there are no perfect witnesses when it comes to dealing with sex crimes, while the squad warms up to him after the departure of Barba.
426	16	"Dare"	Christopher Misiano	Richard Sweren & Céline C. Robinson	March 14, 2018	1916	6.13
The Special Victims Unit is called to a recreation centre after a thirteen year old girl (Nicolette Pierini) disappears while on a school excursion. The detectives soon learn that her two friends left her with a stranger, which makes him the prime suspect. Eventually, the girl is found unconscious in the recreation center, stripped to her underwear. After the girl dies in the hospital due to her injuries, the case takes a shocking twist when it is discovered that the deceased girl's organs were harvested by a surgeon (Janel Moloney) without the parents' consent. Stone takes the extremely controversial and complicated case to court, hoping to get justice for the deceased girl and her mourning family.
427	17	"Send in the Clowns"	Alex Chapple	Julie Martin & Brianna Yellen	March 21, 2018	1917	6.51
The Special Victims Unit is called in to investigate the disappearance of a teenage prodigy (Mallory Bechtel) during a spring break trip. The prime suspect is a butcher (Eric Tabach) who was seen leaving a club in a clown mask with the girl and she was last known to have been at his apartment. However, the case becomes extremely difficult to close. When the detectives try to find her body at a dump, they find that the dump has been emptied. Stone tries to get justice for the girl and lock up the butcher as the chances of the girl being alive become extremely slim. However, towards the end, the case takes a shocking twist and the detectives discover that the real culprit is someone they least suspected. Stone reveals to Benson that he moved to New York to take care of his sister who is mentally ill in a home upstate.
428	18	"Service"	Fred Berner	Lawrence Kaplow & Céline C. Robinson	April 11, 2018	1918	5.43
When a female escort (Morgan Taylor Campbell) is found sexually assaulted and brutally beaten, the Special Victims Unit is called in to investigate. They soon discover that she was in a sleazy hotel with three soldiers from the military. However, the case becomes complicated when one soldier (Marquise Vilsón) refuses to talk and another (Jack DiFalco) confesses to the crime, even though it is clear that he is lying. Eventually, when the real rapist is found and the DNA comes in, the case takes an extremely shocking twist and a huge sacrifice is made by one of the soldiers who has been hiding a secret from the world for a very long time. Meanwhile, Rollins' unprofessional work on the case leads to her revealing a secret from her recent romantic life, having taken the case too personally.
429	19	"Sunk Cost Fallacy"	Michael Pressman	Michael Chernuchin & Allison Intrieri	April 18, 2018	1919	6.58
The Special Victims Unit investigate the disappearance of a mother (Sarah Wilson) and her four year old daughter (Raelynn Zofia Stueber). Through further investigation, they discover that the woman's husband was a violent man (Scott Porter) who abused his family. However, it is soon reported that the mother and daughter were killed by her husband and the husband is locked up. The case takes a massive twist when Benson discovers that the mother and daughter are very much alive, but in hiding thanks to former ADA Alexandra Cabot, who reported the mother and daughter deceased, putting Benson in a complicated position. A tragic twist occurs in the case and Benson is forced to question the entire system. Meanwhile, Stone's sister, Pamela, develops tardive dyskinesia and he has to make a tough decision about her treatment.
430	20	"The Book of Esther"	Jean de Segonzac	Richard Sweren & Ryan Causey	May 2, 2018	1920	6.25
Rollins is called in to rescue a "teenage" girl named Esther (Rebekah Kennedy). When her father (Ray McKinnon) comes to pick her up from SVU, he reveals that Esther is actually 27-years old. The Special Victims Unit soon finds out that the father is a vicious child abuser, who chains his children in a basement and starves them. Rollins grows very close with the girl and promises her that she will get justice for her and keep her safe from her abusive father. Soon enough though, the case becomes extremely dangerous when the father orders Rollins out of his house at gunpoint. Finally, a stand-off ends in a tragic accident on Rollins' part and traumatizes her.
431	21	"Guardian"	Stephanie Marquardt	Julie Martin & Matt Klypka	May 9, 2018	1921	5.71
The Special Victims Unit is called to a crime scene after a woman (Rachel Naomi Hilson) is sexually assaulted and her brother (Rotimi) tells her and the detectives that she was raped. The squad soon learns that she was brutally gang raped by three young men. The detectives arrest them, but the case takes a twist when the men claim they paid for sex from the woman and that her brother is her pimp. The squad soon realizes that the woman's brother is her guardian while their mother is in prison and it becomes clear that her brother is abusive. Tutuola takes the case personally and gets caught up in it while trying to protect the woman from the brother and the three young men, while Stone takes the case to court.
432	22	"Mama"	Jean de Segonzac	Lawrence Kaplow & Elizabeth Rinehart	May 16, 2018	1922	5.31
The Special Victims Unit is called in to investigate a possible sexual assault case after an elderly woman (Fionnula Flanagan) with Alzheimer's claims that she was sexually assaulted. The team investigates her claim, but things become difficult quickly when her statement is questioned due to her condition and her recollection of events and timelines. Nevertheless, Benson digs further, hoping to get justice for the elderly woman. Meanwhile, Tutuola finds out whether or not he has become sergeant of SVU, a long wait after finishing his sergeant's exam.
433	23	"Remember Me"	Alex Chapple	Michael Chernuchin & Julie Martin	May 23, 2018	1923	6.12
The Special Victims Unit is called in after a woman (Genesis Rodriguez) takes a man hostage, the incident being live streamed on a phone he left behind. While police search for the woman and the man, who now appears to be the woman's rapist, Benson enters the apartment where the two are located and is herself taken hostage. Benson then becomes a witness to unfolding events. The hostage situation takes a twist when Benson discovers that the man being held was actually a vicious pimp and kidnapper who abducted the woman a while ago and held her captive. As the hostage siege gets more dangerous, Benson tries to put it to a stop before lives are lost.
434	24	"Remember Me Too"	Alex Chapple	Michael Chernuchin & Julie Martin	May 23, 2018	1924	6.12
As the situation comes to a resolution, the Special Victims Unit investigates the chain of events which led to the hostage siege. After the detectives start doubting the kidnapping and hostage victim's testimony, an extremely dangerous criminal network is discovered by the Special Victims Unit, which is prepared to do anything needed for justice, leading to the squad investigating the criminal network. Whilst investigating, Stone's sister is abducted by the criminal network in an extremely brutal shooting at the psychiatric hospital where she lives. The detectives frantically search for her, ending tragically for Stone, his sister, and the detectives involved.

== Ratings ==
Viewership and ratings per episode of Law & Order: Special Victims Unit season 19
No.	Title	Air date	Rating/share (18–49)	Viewers (millions)	DVR (18–49)	DVR viewers (millions)	Total (18–49)	Total viewers (millions)
1	"Gone Fishin'"	September 27, 2017	1.4/5	5.67	1.0	3.19	2.4	8.83
2	"Mood"	October 4, 2017	1.3/5	5.82	—N/a	—N/a	—N/a	—N/a
3	"Contrapasso"	October 11, 2017	1.2/5	5.79	1.0	2.82	2.2	8.61
4	"No Good Reason"	October 18, 2017	1.2/4	5.58	1.0	2.85	2.2	8.45
5	"Complicated"	October 25, 2017	1.2/4	5.81	0.9	2.77	2.1	8.59
6	"Unintended Consequences"	November 8, 2017	1.1/4	4.97	0.9	3.04	2.0	8.01
7	"Something Happened"	November 29, 2017	1.5/5	7.07	1.0	3.08	2.5	10.15
8	"Intent"	December 6, 2017	1.3/5	6.18	0.9	2.68	2.2	8.86
9	"Gone Baby Gone"	January 3, 2018	1.4/5	6.23	0.9	2.90	2.3	9.13
10	"Pathological"	January 10, 2018	1.3/5	6.06	1.0	3.09	2.3	9.15
11	"Flight Risk"	January 17, 2018	1.4/5	6.21	1.0	2.98	2.4	9.17
12	"Info Wars"	January 31, 2018	1.2/5	5.48	1.0	3.01	2.2	8.48
13	"The Undiscovered Country"	February 7, 2018	1.3/5	6.64	1.0	3.17	2.3	9.81
14	"Chasing Demons"	February 28, 2018	1.1/4	5.55	1.0	3.01	2.1	8.56
15	"In Loco Parentis"	March 7, 2018	1.2/5	5.51	0.8	2.76	2.0	8.30
16	"Dare"	March 14, 2018	1.3/5	6.13	1.0	2.84	2.3	8.97
17	"Send In The Clowns"	March 21, 2018	1.4/5	6.51	0.9	2.78	2.3	9.29
18	"Service"	April 11, 2018	1.1/4	5.43	0.8	2.80	1.9	8.23
19	"Sunk Cost Fallacy"	April 18, 2018	1.4/5	6.58	0.8	2.94	2.2	9.52
20	"The Book of Esther"	May 2, 2018	1.2/5	6.25	0.8	2.73	2.0	8.84
21	"Guardian"	May 9, 2018	1.1/4	5.71	0.9	2.67	2.0	8.39
22	"Mama"	May 16, 2018	1.0/4	5.31	0.9	2.77	1.9	8.09
23	"Remember Me"	May 23, 2018	1.2/5	6.12	0.9	2.91	2.1	9.03
24	"Remember Me Too"	May 23, 2018	1.2/5	6.12	0.9	2.91	2.1	9.03
