= Law & Order: Special Victims Unit season 18 =

Season of American television series

Law & Order: Special Victims Unit
- Season 18
- Season 18 U.S. DVD cover
- Starring: Mariska Hargitay; Kelli Giddish; Ice-T; Peter Scanavino; Raúl Esparza
- No. of episodes: 21

Release
- Original network: NBC
- Original release: September 21, 2016 – May 24, 2017

Season chronology
- ← Previous; Season 17 Next → Season 19

The eighteenth season of Law & Order: Special Victims Unit debuted on Wednesday, September 21, 2016, on NBC and finished on Wednesday, May 24, 2017, with a two-hour season finale.

Rick Eid, who previously worked on Law & Order and Law & Order: Trial by Jury, became the executive producer and showrunner, following Warren Leight's departure from the series at the conclusion of the seventeenth season. Eid himself departed the series at the end of the eighteenth season and was replaced by Michael S. Chernuchin.

== Production ==
Law & Order: Special Victims Unit was renewed for an eighteenth season on February 1, 2016, by NBC. It was announced in March 2015 that season seventeen would be showrunner/executive producer Warren Leight's last season on the show; he signed a three-year deal with Sony Pictures Television, his contract allowing him to work on SVU for one final season. On March 10, 2016, it was announced that Rick Eid would replace Leight as showrunner on this season.

The 400th episode of the series aired this season. "Motherly Love", directed by Mariska Hargitay, was filmed and billed as the 400th episode. However, due to the shuffling of episodes during the season, it aired as the 399th episode. The 400th episode was the eleventh episode of the season, "Great Expectations," which aired on NBC on February 15, 2017 (after being moved from its initial air date of November 9, 2016, and a second air date of January 4, 2017).

At the end of production of the season, during upfronts SVU was renewed for a nineteenth season. Following the renewal announcement, it was revealed that show runner/executive producer Rick Eid had departed the show. He took over Chicago P.D. as showrunner/EP starting with its fifth season, replacing C.P.D. co-creator/EP Matt Olmstead. Michael Chernuchin, former showrunner and executive producer for Dick Wolf's Chicago Justice series, as well as a former executive producer and writer for many past incarnations of the Law & Order franchise, was selected as SVU's new showrunner.

=== Storylines and cast changes ===
It was announced at the end of the seventeenth season that recurring star Andy Karl (who portrayed Sergeant Mike Dodds) would be departing the cast due to his Broadway work. He was killed off on the season finale by corrupt corrections officer Gary Munson.

It was announced on July 22, 2016, that SVU would do a ripped from the headlines episode based on Netflix documentary Making a Murderer. Henry Thomas appeared alongside Kelli Williams in the episode about a convicted rapist who is exonerated after DNA is freshly tested. Ice-T's character, Fin Tutuola, originally arrested Thomas' character 16 years earlier and then begins investigating him again when he is linked to a deadly crime. Williams played Melanie, a rape victim who initially identified Thomas' character. On August 20, 2016, it was announced that the season premiere would pit ADA Rafael Barba (Raúl Esparza) against Lt. Olivia Benson (Mariska Hargitay) on opposing sides of the verdict. The episode "Rape Interrupted" (which guest stars Anthony Edwards), was ripped from the headlines based on the Brock Turner sexual assault case, where Turner sexually assaulted an unconscious girl and was later convicted of three felony sexual assault charges. Turner was leniently punished as he only served three months of his six-month sentence, though he originally faced 14 years in prison based on charges. Executive producer Julie Martin told The Huffington Post, "It is a phenomenon. Unfortunately, there have been several cases like that over the spring and the summer." Hargitay pondered if a similar case were to happen on the show: "Like if I was the detective on that case? It could be healing to somebody to see what should happen. [Seeing] justice," Hargitay continued, "If a judge would do a different sentence. You know, that's healing for people to see the right thing, the just thing happen."

== Cast ==
=== Main ===
- Mariska Hargitay as Lieutenant Olivia Benson
- Kelli Giddish as Junior Detective Amanda Rollins
- Ice-T as Senior Detective Odafin "Fin" Tutuola
- Peter Scanavino as Junior Detective Dominick "Sonny" Carisi, Jr.
- Raúl Esparza as Assistant District Attorney Rafael Barba

=== Recurring ===
- Kirk Acevedo as Detective Ray Lopez
- Betsy Aidem as Dr Sloane
- Max Baker as Colin Bennett
- Jason Bowen as Detective Marcus Perry
- Ami Brabson as Judge Karyn Blake
- Stephen C. Bradbury as Judge Colin McNamara
- Robert John Burke as Internal Affairs Bureau Captain Ed Tucker
- Erica Camarano as Officer Rachel Ortiz
- Helmar Augustus Cooper as Judge Reginald Flowers
- Vincent Curatola as Judge Al Burtuccio
- Eric Elizaga as Dr. Stephen Hale
- Peter Gallagher as Deputy Chief William Dodds
- Greg Germann as Derek Strauss
- Mary Hodges as Judge Anita Wright
- Tabitha Holbert as Assistant District Attorney Rose Callier
- Meredith Holzman as Counselor Naomi Ziegler
- Bill Irwin as Dr. Peter Lindstrom
- Yvonna Kopacz-Wright as Dr. Darby Wilder
- Michael Kostroff as Attorney Evan Braun
- Sonia Manzano as Judge Gloria Pepitone
- Elizabeth Marvel as Defense Attorney Rita Calhoun
- Michael Mastro as Judge Serani
- Olga Merediz as Judge Roberta Martinez
- Barbara Miluski as Judge Lisa Peck
- Lauren Noble as Carmen
- Lindsay Pulsipher as Kim Rollins
- Bronwyn Reed as Lucy Huston
- Steve Rosen as Defense Attorney Michael Guthrie
- Jenna Stern as Judge Elana Barth
- Callie Thorne as Defense Attorney Nikki Staines
- Bjorn Thorstad as Defense Attorney Mitch Jackson
- Delaney Williams as Defense Attorney John Buchanan

=== Guest stars ===
On July 29, 2016, it was announced that then-Vice President Joe Biden would appear in the September 28 episode ("Making a Rapist") as himself to talk about the backlog of rape kits. Henry Thomas also appeared alongside Kelli Williams in the episode, Thomas portraying a convicted rapist who is exonerated after DNA is freshly retested.

On September 8, 2016, The Hollywood Reporter revealed that Anthony Edwards would guest star on SVU. Edwards starred on the NBC medical drama ER as Dr. Mark Greene; in season four of the medical series, Mariska Hargitay guest starred as Greene's love interest, Desk Clerk Cynthia Hooper. Later, TV Guide announced that Edwards would be portraying Benson's very first partner out of the Academy, Sgt. Patrick Griffin in "Rape Interrupted". Griffin's son is the suspect in a rape investigation that puts Benson at odds with ADA Barba and Griffin. Hollywood Reporter announced that rapper-actor Wyclef Jean was guest starring in the episode "Broken Rhymes" (originally titled "Bad Rap") as a famed music producer whose client is embroiled in an assault case. Mitchell Edwards portrayed Hype in the episode as well.

On October 11, 2016, Hollywood Reporter reported that Gary Cole would guest star as a politician whose campaign goes haywire when several women go public with damaging accusations. The character and the episode, titled "Unstoppable," drew comparisons to then-presidential candidate Donald Trump. The episode was originally scheduled to air on October 26, but was then delayed until November 16 after the election finished. The episode was pulled from the schedule a second time and is indefinitely shelved.

== Episodes ==
Law & Order: Special Victims Unit season 18 episodes
No. overall	No. in season	Title	Directed by	Written by	Original release date	Prod. code	U.S. viewers (millions)
390	1	"Terrorized"	Alik Sakharov	Rick Eid & Julie Martin	September 21, 2016	1801	7.83
When Lt. Benson finds a boy alone in Central Park, he draws a gun on her. The SVU team finds the boy's parents as they execute a planned terrorist attack at the park. When the father is killed by police in a shootout in Central Park during an event, the boy's mother (Natia Dune) says that she was forced to carry out the attack, as she was raped and beaten for five years by the father and his brother. Benson and Barba are at odds over the mother's claims, with Benson pushing for leniency. Meanwhile, a distraught Deputy Chief Dodds accuses Benson of getting his son killed.: Episode inspired by the FBI–Apple encryption dispute from the 2015 San Bernardino attack
391	2	"Making a Rapist"	Michael Pressman	Kevin Fox	September 28, 2016	1802	6.09
When a DNA rape kit is tested 16 years later, the man originally convicted of the crime, Sean Roberts (Henry Thomas), is released from prison. He befriends the victim and her daughter (Alexis Collins), being invited to the daughter's wedding. One month after Roberts' release, the daughter is found raped and murdered with evidence pointing to him. Meanwhile, Fin Tutuola is accused of framing Roberts as payback for tarnishing his arrest record, having been the original arresting officer. Vice President Joe Biden makes a cameo appearance in the cold open.
392	3	"Imposter"	Jean de Segonzac	Rick Eid & Gavin Harris	October 5, 2016	1803	5.76
The SVU team is sent to a fancy hotel when a woman (Paula Marshall) accidentally overdoses on drugs, claiming to have been raped by a man, Tom Metcalf (Wallace Langham), posing as the admissions director for Hudson University. As the investigation unravels, they learn that the man has victimized multiple mothers desperate to send their children to the university. When Metcalf is charged with rape, ADA Barba is forced to make a deal with the judge, who believes the case is not fit for prosecution, in order to get justice for the families, but things go terribly wrong.
393	4	"Heightened Emotions"	Alex Chapple	Julie Martin & Céline C. Robinson	October 12, 2016	1805	5.88
A troubled, but determined athlete with a double life (Brit Morgan) claims she was raped after she is found by police officers drunk and bleeding. SVU come to help the woman, but the case eventually becomes very shaky when she starts to show signs of an undiagnosed mental illness. Meanwhile, Rollins' sister Kim is released from prison on parole, claiming to be totally reformed, and she and Amanda try to rekindle their relationship, but Amanda finds it hard to trust her.: Based on the life of US Olympic runner Suzy Favor Hamilton.
394	5	"Rape Interrupted"	Michael Pressman	Julie Martin & Brianna Yellen	October 26, 2016	1806	5.85
After Ellis Griffin (Corey Cott) the son of Olivia's former partner Patrick Griffin (Anthony Edwards), is accused of rape by a woman who attended a party with him, Olivia is faced with the tough decision to choose between loyalty or duty. With Patrick pressuring Olivia to drop the investigation, it causes tension both in the squad room and between Olivia and Patrick. Eventually, Olivia makes her decision and it leaves her saddened about the outcome that follows.: Episode inspired by the Brock Turner case (People v. Turner).
395	6	"Broken Rhymes"	Adam Bernstein	Rick Eid & Jeffrey Baker	November 9, 2016	1807	5.55
After a transgender individual (Sabel Gonzales) is assaulted in a public bathroom, SVU questions the CEO of a record label (Wyclef Jean) who may be linked to the assault. The case is initially believed to be a hate crime, but things take a twist when the prime suspect reveals his connection to the victim and several people are found brutally murdered. With the victim's life on the line, things eventually become very intense for both the detectives and the suspects.
396	7	"Next Chapter"	Fred Berner	Rick Eid & Gavin Harris	January 4, 2017	1809	5.82
A woman is sexually assaulted and she believes the perpetrator is the same man that went to prison for stalking her. The detectives investigate, but the case eventually becomes extremely dangerous. Carisi's life is soon put in serious danger when he and Olivia visit the prime suspect's house and shots are fired. Meanwhile, Tucker contemplates retirement and a possible future with Olivia, which leaves her with mixed feelings.
397	8	"Chasing Theo"	Jean de Segonzac	Julie Martin & Robert Brooks Cohen	January 11, 2017	1810	6.05
A six-year-old boy (Iain Armitage) is abducted from his bedroom after his mother (Rachelle Lefevre) throws a wild party with drugs involved. The case brings forward several suspects and the detectives are led to multiple locations and tip-offs. The case becomes distressing for Rollins and Benson, both mothers. As hours go by, the squad becomes desperate to find the boy, which makes the mother and her ex-girlfriend fret. Meanwhile, Benson breaks up with Tucker after several days of thinking, breaking both her and Tucker's hearts.
398	9	"Decline and Fall"	Jean de Segonzac	Ed Zuckerman & Robert Brooks Cohen	January 18, 2017	1811	6.46
A powerful and rich family who owns a major retail empire closes ranks after a bartender (Ariane Rinehart) accuses one of the family members of rape. The bartender remembers nothing of the rape and it is quickly suspected that she may have been drugged or had her drink spiked. Benson treats the case seriously and it quickly becomes complicated. The case exposes the whole family's nasty secrets and several stories are told, frustrating the detectives.
399	10	"Motherly Love"	Mariska Hargitay	Rick Eid & Julie Martin	February 8, 2017	1812	6.93
A teenage boy (Aaron Sanders) murders a person, later revealed to be his best friend, whom he believed was raping his mother (Sarah Wynter) at the time. The mother, a psychiatrist, claims that her son's best friend had an obsession with her. A seemingly open-and-shut case is revealed to involve layers of deceit and manipulation on the mother's part, who is not as innocent as she seems and may be hiding several secrets.: This episode was produced and announced as the 400th episode of the series but actually aired as the 399th episode.
400	11	"Great Expectations"	Martha Mitchell	Kevin Fox & Brendan Feeney	February 15, 2017	1808	6.00
After a thirteen-year-old boy (Christopher Paul Richards) is sexually assaulted in what appears to be a vicious locker room hazing, the detectives investigate the players of a top youth hockey team and come up with a few suspects. The case eventually brings forward a boy (Lincoln Melcher) who has obviously been physically abused by his father (Brent Sexton) in the same way his brother (Ben Cook) had been, but he does not want to talk about it out of devotion to his father. Carisi takes the case very personally, which causes some conflict between him and Rollins. The case, however, goes horribly wrong and sacrifices are soon made by the abused brothers, their mother, and Carisi himself.
401	12	"No Surrender"	Stephanie Marquardt	Gavin Harris & Kinan Copen	February 22, 2017	1813	5.76
Fin revisits his military roots when a fellow Army Ranger (Sarah Booth) is the victim of sexual assault and does not handle it well. SVU is soon called in to assist and it is revealed that the woman was sexually assaulted after a party she threw. The case becomes difficult when the victim refuses to cooperate and Olivia and Fin become convinced that the rapist is someone against her being a Ranger, but the rapist turns out to be someone unexpected after a secret is revealed.
402	13	"Genes"	Michael Pressman	Rick Eid & Céline C. Robinson	March 22, 2017	1815	5.19
A woman comes to SVU saying she was raped. When the detectives go to arrest the assailant (Michael Torpey), he claims that he has a rape gene, and he cannot help it having been born that way. The case becomes very controversial and causes extreme tension, both in the squad room and between the detectives and the DA's office. The man's claim causes Benson to think back to both her and Noah's rapist fathers, making her worry, albeit briefly, if Noah has any chance of following in his footsteps.
403	14	"Net Worth"	Alex Chapple	Rick Eid & Jeffrey Baker	March 29, 2017	1816	5.00
An investment banker (Missy Peregrym) accuses one of her billionaire clients (Tate Donovan) of raping her. SVU is called in to handle the delicate case, but they must tread carefully, as the accused is extremely wealthy and one wrong move could ruin everything. The case, however, becomes complicated when several bribes and deals are offered. Meanwhile, Fin is promoted to Sergeant.
404	15	"Know It All"	Jonathan Herron	Ed Zuckerman & Kevin Fox	April 5, 2017	1814	5.07
The detectives arrest a suspect (Chris Diamantopoulos) charged with the rape and murder of a young female co-worker. However, the reputations of all the SVU squad members, Barba included, are put on the line when the suspect reveals he knows their intimate secrets and threatens to expose them if the charges against him are not dropped. The secrets cause major conflicts within the squadroom and Barba reveals a secret that could cost him his entire career.
405	16	"The Newsroom"	Jono Oliver	Story by : Warren Leight & Julie Martin; Teleplay by : Julie Martin & Brianna Yellen	April 26, 2017	1817	5.22
When a news anchor (Bonnie Somerville) makes a rape allegation against her boss (Christopher McDonald) on live TV, Benson, Barba, and the rest of the SVU squad ask corroborators to put their jobs on the line by confirming the allegations. However, they are very hesitant, afraid of losing their jobs or getting bad reputations. The defense complicates the case by making it seem as though the allegations sprung from the victim losing her job. Meanwhile, Dodds, fresh from vacation, returns to work to make amends with Benson for the remarks he made about his son a few months back.: Episode inspired by the sexual assault allegations against Fox News reporter Bill O'Reilly and Fox News founder, chairman, and CEO Roger Ailes.
406	17	"Real Fake News"	Martha Mitchell	Ed Zuckerman	May 3, 2017	1818	5.06
The SVU squad is asked by a US Representative (James Waterston) to debunk sexual assault rumors currently against him, but it takes a surprising twist when they are led to something much more deplorable. Things eventually become extremely personal when Benson and Rollins are targeted by a news website of questionable validity, with pictures of them and their children spreading false rumors about the nature of their families. Both detectives become infuriated and upset, vowing to stop the website and the man running it.: Episode inspired by the Pizzagate conspiracy theory and the surrounding hysteria following fake news stories claiming that various pizza parlors were fronts for human trafficking rings.
407	18	"Spellbound"	Jean de Segonzac	Gavin Harris & Kinan Copen	May 10, 2017	1819	5.01
The team investigates the motives and career of a charismatic spiritual healer and hypnotist (Stuart Townsend) when a man comes into the squad room and says that his girlfriend was sexually assaulted by the healer. The detectives and Barba question whether hypnosis skills can be proven as the MO in a sexual assault case.
408	19	"Conversion"	Alex Chapple	Kevin Fox & Brendan Feeney	May 17, 2017	1820	5.56
A church group from Indiana visits New York and reports to the Special Victims Unit that one of their members was sexually assaulted by another member. When the rapist (Casey Cott) is found, he claims it was curative intercourse to cure the girl of her homosexuality and that he was saving her soul. The detectives investigate and must decide whether the rapist is sincere in his beliefs or if something else happened to cause him to attack the victim. They end up finding out that the rapist is hiding a secret.
409	20	"American Dream"	Jean de Segonzac	Rick Eid & Julie Martin	May 24, 2017	1821	5.80
An extremely brutal hate crime is committed against a Muslim family who owns a restaurant, resulting in two deaths. The detectives investigate, but things become extremely complicated when a crucial witness is suddenly and unexpectedly deported back to his own country. This forces Barba to drop the charges, causing extreme tension, anger, and violence between communities on opposing sides of the case.
410	21	"Sanctuary"	Michael Pressman	Rick Eid & Julie Martin	May 24, 2017	1822	6.22
The Special Victims Unit continues to investigate the hate crime against the Muslim family who were viciously assaulted in their restaurant. When their main suspect in the crime is released from custody, Benson and Barba become caught between the Muslim family and the suspect's family, both seeking justice for their loved ones. Protests in the streets start to turn extremely violent and Benson is faced with a tough decision that she has never had to make before in her entire career in order to make an arrest and get justice.

=== Shelved episode ===
"Unstoppable", written by Julie Martin and Rick Eid, inspired by the sexual misconduct allegations against then-presidential candidate Donald Trump and starring Gary Cole, was originally scheduled to air on October 26, 2016, but it was pulled from the schedule and has since been shelved. At the 2017 Television Critics Association winter press tour, Dick Wolf expressed his belief that the episode might air that spring. NBC currently has no plans to air the episode.

== Reception ==
No.	Title	Air date	Ratings/share (18–49)	Viewers (millions)	DVR 18–49	DVR viewers (millions)	Total 18–49	Total viewers (millions)
1	"Terrorized"	September 21, 2016	1.8/6	7.83	1.3	3.46	3.1	11.28
2	"Making a Rapist"	September 28, 2016	1.6/5	6.09	1.1	3.23	2.7	9.28
3	"Imposter"	October 5, 2016	1.4/5	5.76	1.1	3.24	2.5	9.00
4	"Heightened Emotions"	October 12, 2016	1.4/5	5.88	1.1	3.00	2.5	8.87
5	"Rape Interrupted"	October 26, 2016	1.5/5	5.85	1.1	2.96	2.6	8.82
6	"Broken Rhymes"	November 9, 2016	1.3/4	5.55	0.8	2.20	2.1	7.75
7	"Next Chapter"	January 4, 2017	1.5/5	5.82	1.0	2.99	2.5	8.86
8	"Chasing Theo"	January 11, 2017	1.4/5	6.05	1.1	3.00	2.5	9.04
9	"Decline and Fall"	January 18, 2017	1.4/5	6.46	1.1	3.16	2.5	9.62
10	"Motherly Love"	February 8, 2017	1.6/6	6.93	1.2	3.23	2.8	10.15
11	"Great Expectations"	February 15, 2017	1.4/5	6.00	0.8	2.20	2.2	8.20
12	"No Surrender"	February 22, 2017	1.3/5	5.76	1.0	3.00	2.3	8.76
13	"Genes"	March 22, 2017	1.2/4	5.19	1.1	3.16	2.3	8.35
14	"Net Worth"	March 29, 2017	1.1/4	5.00	0.9	2.67	2.0	7.67
15	"Know It All"	April 5, 2017	1.2/4	5.07	0.9	2.83	2.1	7.90
16	"The Newsroom"	April 26, 2017	1.1/4	5.22	—N/a	—N/a	—N/a	—N/a
17	"Real Fake News"	May 3, 2017	1.0/4	5.06	1.0	2.87	2.0	7.93
18	"Spellbound"	May 10, 2017	1.1/4	5.01	0.9	2.78	2.0	7.79
19	"Conversion"	May 17, 2017	1.2/5	5.56	1.0	2.88	2.2	8.43
20	"American Dream"	May 24, 2017	1.3/5	5.80	—N/a	—N/a	—N/a	—N/a
21	"Sanctuary"	May 24, 2017	1.4/5	6.22	—N/a	—N/a	—N/a	—N/a
