= Law & Order: Special Victims Unit season 20 =

Season of American television series

Law & Order: Special Victims Unit
- Season 20
- Season 20 U.S. DVD cover
- Starring: Mariska Hargitay; Kelli Giddish; Ice-T; Peter Scanavino; Philip Winchester
- No. of episodes: 24

Release
- Original network: NBC
- Original release: September 27, 2018 – May 16, 2019

Season chronology
- ← Previous; Season 19 Next → Season 21

The twentieth season of Law & Order: Special Victims Unit premiered on Thursday, September 27, 2018, at 9PM ET with a two-part premiere episode. The following Thursday, the series started airing new episodes at 10PM ET. The season ended on May 16, 2019.

This landmark season of SVU tied it with both the original Law & Order series and Gunsmoke as longest-running scripted non-animated American primetime TV series. On March 29, 2019, as it was announced that SVU was renewed for a twenty-first, record-breaking season, it was also announced this season would be the last season to feature Philip Winchester.

== Production ==
Law & Order: Special Victims Unit was renewed for a twentieth season on May 9, 2018. Production started on July 16, 2018. On July 12, 2018, Executive Producer Julie Martin posted a photo of a script on Twitter, teasing that the first hour of the two-hour season premiere was tentatively titled "Man Up". Martin teased on August 14, 2018, that the fourth episode of the season, titled "Revenge", would be "a devious twist and turn edge-of-your-seater". The episode also featured Callie Thorne as defense attorney Nikki Staines. A deleted scene featuring Benson and Noah from the previous season was re-shot and placed into the episode "Dear Ben", the scene being where Noah has a question about his father followed up by ADA Stone (Philip Winchester) taking Noah out to play baseball. It was confirmed that Hargitay would direct the ninth episode of the season, titled "Mea Culpa", marking it the sixth episode she has directed for the series. On December 3, 2018, Julie Martin confirmed that the episode count for this season is 24. On March 1, 2019, it was announced that actress Lucy Liu would be directing the episode "Dearly Beloved," which aired April 4.

After the season wrapped production, it was announced that showrunner/executive producer Michael Chernuchin departed the show for another Wolf Films series, FBI on CBS. Former showrunner/EP Warren Leight (seasons 13–17) is set to return for the record-breaking 21st season. Executive producer/director Alex Chapple will join Chernuchin and will be replaced by Law & Order/Law & Order: Criminal Intent veteran executive producer/director Norberto Barba.

== Cast ==
=== Main ===
- Mariska Hargitay as Lieutenant Olivia Benson
- Kelli Giddish as Senior Detective Amanda Rollins
- Ice-T as Senior Detective Sergeant Odafin "Fin" Tutuola
- Peter Scanavino as Junior Detective Dominick "Sonny" Carisi, Jr.
- Philip Winchester as Assistant District Attorney Peter Stone

=== Recurring ===
- Jolly Abraham as Dr. Patel
- Betsy Aidem as Dr. Sloane
- Alan Ariano as Judge Lee Wong
- Joanne Baron as Defense Attorney Diane Schwartz
- Paul Bomba as Officer Bobby Nardone
- Ami Brabson as Judge Karyn Blake
- Ryan Buggle as Noah Porter-Benson
- Vivian and Charlotte Cabell as Jesse Rollins
- Erica Camarano as Officer Rachel Ortiz
- Tom Coiner as Officer Chuck Inslow
- Vincent Curatola as Judge Al Bertuccio
- Ned Eisenberg as Defense Attorney Roger Kressler
- Kurt Fuller as Civil Rights Attorney Jed Karey
- Peter Gallagher as Deputy Chief William Dodds
- Gillian Glasco as Officer Dominique Rivers
- Joe Grifasi as Judge Hashi Horowitz
- Eddie Hargitay as Officer Eddie Montero
- Mary Hodges as Judge Anita Wright
- Sandrine Holt as Psychologist Lisa Abernathy
- Meredith Holzman as Counselor Naomi Ziegler
- Brittany Jeffery as Defense Attorney Leah Simon
- Kathryn Kates as Judge Marlene Simons
- Richard Kind as Defense Attorney William Biegel
- Yvonna Kopacz-Wright as Dr. Darby Wilder
- Michael Kostroff as Defense Attorney Evan Braun
- Michael Mastro as Judge Serani
- Edelen McWilliams as Crime Scene Unit Technician Martin
- Olga Merediz as Judge Roberta Martinez
- Barbara Miluski as Judge Lisa Peck
- George Newbern as Dr. Al Pollack
- Lauren Noble as Carmen
- Ngo Okafor as Wyatt
- Jennifer Regan as Assistant District Attorney Kim Caldwell
- Jillian Rose as Attica Staines
- Steve Rosen as Defense Attorney Michael Guthrie
- John Rothman as Judge Edward Kofax
- Barrett Shuler as Sergeant Ryan Klypka
- Sarah Ellen Stephens as Officer Selena Gaines
- Jenna Stern as Judge Elana Barth
- Callie Thorne as Defense Attorney Nikki Staines
- Dov Tiefenbach as Medical Examiner Fitz
- Tom Titone as Judge Joshua Goldfarb
- Aida Turturro as Judge Felicia Catano
- William Oliver Watkins as Emergency Services Unit Officer Mido Hamid
- Carl Weathers as State's Attorney Mark Jefferies
- Titus Welliver as Rob Miller
- Dean Winters as District Attorney Investigator Brian Cassidy

=== Guest stars ===
On July 13, 2018, Deadline announced that Scandal's George Newbern would be guest starring over the course of the season in a recurring role as Dr. Al Pollack. Pollack is described as a charming, handsome, and wealthy doctor who is set to be a future as well as past love interest to Detective Amanda Rollins (Kelli Giddish). Rollins mentions him cheating on her with a prostitute in the previous season. Days later it was reported that Dylan Walsh would play John Conway, an abusive father who rapes his own son, in the season premiere. Walsh previously guest starred in the eighth season.

Carl Weathers reprised his role as his Chicago Justice character, State's Attorney Mark Jefferies, in the episode "Zero Tolerance". On August 16, 2018, The Hollywood Reporter announced that Homeland actress Sandrine Holt would be cast in a recurring role this season, as Dr. Lisa Abernathy, a clinical psychologist that consults on cases for the district attorney's office. Holt previously guest starred in the seventeenth season. On September 27, 2018, Entertainment Weekly reported that Sebastian Roché would guest star as Arlo Beck, the charismatic leader of a female empowerment group, in the episode "Accredo", which aired October 18, 2018. Roché previously made two guest appearances on the flagship series, Law & Order. Sasha Alexander guest starred as Anna Mill, a woman who murdered her husband and two children in the November 1st episode "Caretaker." On January 14, 2019, Julie Martin confirmed that Dean Winters would reprise his role as Brian Cassidy in February.

On January 22, 2019, it was confirmed Jennifer Esposito would be guest starring as Vice squad Sgt. Phoebe Baker in the episode "Brothel". Baker worked in Narcotics with Sgt. Tutuola before he transferred to SVU; she teams up with the SVU to investigate a chain of pop-up brothels where young women are found murdered. Esposito previously guest starred as a victim in the first season. On February 27, 2019, TV Line released that Titus Welliver would be guest starring in the episode "Blackout" as NYPD attorney, Rob Miller. Writer/EP Julie Martin on Twitter tweeted that Welliver would be returning in the last two episodes of the season. Rapper-actor Snoop Dogg guest-starred in the May 2 episode titled "Diss". The news was revealed by Ice-T on Twitter in a behind the scenes picture. In addition to Snoop Dogg, Orlando Jones, Amber Stevens West, and L. Scott Caldwell also guest-starred in the episode.

== Episodes ==
Law & Order: Special Victims Unit season 20 episodes
No. overall	No. in season	Title	Directed by	Written by	Original release date	Prod. code	U.S. viewers (millions)
435	1	"Man Up"	Alex Chapple	Michael Chernuchin & Julie Martin	September 27, 2018	2001	5.09
The Special Victims Unit is called in after a fifteen-year-old boy (Bryce Romero) is sexually assaulted. Despite having evidence, he is too scared to name his attacker (Dylan Walsh), making things complicated for the detectives. When the identity of the attacker is discovered, the detectives do their best to protect the teenager from being abused again. Meanwhile, Rollins talks things through with her ex-boyfriend who cheated on her with an escort and also confides in Benson that she is pregnant for a second time. Benson expresses concern to Tutuola that she is not as strong or fast as she used to be.
436	2	"Man Down"	Alex Chapple	Michael Chernuchin & Julie Martin	September 27, 2018	2004	5.09
The case involving a teenager who was sexually assaulted continues and Stone takes the rapist to court. However, an unexpected verdict comes back, shocking everyone involved. The victim ends up making a tragic decision which results in several people dead and injured and the Special Victims Unit must charge the victim. An upset Stone along with the rest of the squad decide to try their best to charge the boy's rapist as well in order to get justice for all the victims who were killed or injured in the attack. Meanwhile, Rollins starts having doubts about her pregnancy.
437	3	"Zero Tolerance"	Michael Pressman	Richard Sweren & Céline C. Robinson	October 4, 2018	2002	4.21
A nine-year-old girl (Scarlett Lopez) is taken from her mother at the U.S.–Mexico border and ends up in a child sex trafficking ring in New York, which quickly comes to the attention of the Special Victims Unit. Benson and Stone try their hardest to reunite the girl with her family within the court system but meet many obstacles along the way. Eventually, Stone decides to ask for help from an old friend. Meanwhile, Rollins decides to give her rocky relationship with Pollack another chance.
438	4	"Revenge"	Martha Mitchell	Michael Chernuchin & Lawrence Kaplow	October 11, 2018	2003	4.44
The Special Victims Unit is called in after a seemingly random young couple is brutally assaulted by a masked pizza delivery man in their apartment. The detectives soon realize they are dealing with a serial rapist when another couple is assaulted. Eventually, the detectives discover a complicated and twisted revenge plot relating to the past history of one of the victims (Kennedy McMann) and the rapist, explaining what could have caused someone to attack her and several others.
439	5	"Accredo"	Jean de Segonzac	Julie Martin & Brianna Yellen	October 18, 2018	2005	3.95
The Special Victims Unit is called in after a woman who is part of a women's empowerment group is found brutally sexually assaulted and murdered. The prime suspect quickly becomes her ex-husband due to her violent past with him, but eventually the detectives are led to the empowerment group's charismatic male leader (Sebastian Roché) who may not be as charming as he seems. Meanwhile, Rollins tries to keep her pregnancy under wraps to avoid desk duty and the entire squad start to wonder who the baby's father is.: Inspired by the NXIVM case.
440	6	"Exile"	Stephanie Marquardt	Michael Chernuchin & Allison Intrieri	October 25, 2018	2006	4.22
The Special Victims Unit is called in to investigate the sexual assault of a young homeless woman (Aimée Spring Fortier). The squad soon realizes that the woman has a dual personality which makes things complicated. However, when she goes missing, the squad becomes challenged to not only uncover her whereabouts but also her real identity. The detectives later discover that someone from her past may be responsible and that the assault may have happened a long time ago. However, the squad meet a dead end in their investigation and Benson makes a generous decision to help the victim recover from her ordeal.
441	7	"Caretaker"	Jono Oliver	Jordan Barsky	November 1, 2018	2007	4.62
The Special Victims Unit is called in to investigate what could possibly be their most heinous and disturbing crime when a father and his daughter are found brutally murdered in their home and his son is found wandering the streets, with stab wounds and blood all over him. The detectives investigate the case while trying not to let their emotions get the better of them and when the murderer (Sasha Alexander) is discovered and the motives of the crime are finally uncovered, it comes as a shock to everyone involved and Benson starts having mixed feelings about the nature of the crime committed.
442	8	"Hell's Kitchen"	Monica Raymund	Richard Sweren & Ryan Causey	November 8, 2018	2008	4.44
The Special Victims Unit is called in after a woman (Genevieve Angelson) who works at a trendy popular restaurant is sexually assaulted at a VIP after-party. At first, the victim is reluctant to talk to the detectives, wanting to let it go, but they soon discover that there are more victims and that the rapist's assaults go way back to when the rapist was in high school. The detectives are soon led to an ADA (Jacob Pitts) who is a dedicated advocate for women’s rights, who might be holding secrets related to the case. Meanwhile, Benson becomes stressed as Noah’s defiant behavior continues.
443	9	"Mea Culpa"	Mariska Hargitay	Michael Chernuchin & Julie Martin	November 15, 2018	2009	4.00
The Special Victims Unit are put into a difficult situation after Stone is accused of sexual assault by a woman (Alexandra Breckenridge), which forces the detectives to take sides and makes Benson question Stone's integrity and reputation due to the allegation, which Stone denies ever happened. Alongside that, they also take a complicated case to trial after a woman claims she was raped at a party by a man, who has a clever defense attorney. Meanwhile, Pollack makes a proposal to Rollins, which leaves her with mixed feelings about the whole thing suggested to her.
444	10	"Alta Kockers"	Alex Chapple	Michael Chernuchin	November 29, 2018	2010	3.88
When a young, promising transgender author is found murdered and physically assaulted, the Special Victims Unit is called in to investigate the case. The detectives are soon led to two elderly, reclusive brothers (Judd Hirsch and Wallace Shawn) who have both been harboring a terrible secret for several decades, which soon leads to a case of child sexual abuse suffered by both of the men in the past, which could change how the investigation goes when a decades old murder is uncovered.
445	11	"Plastic"	Fred Berner	Lawrence Kaplow & Brianna Yellen	January 10, 2019	2011	4.00
The Special Victims Unit is called in to investigate after a young woman is drugged and sexually assaulted. The woman claims she was raped by a famous celebrity surgeon and his girlfriend (Mark Feuerstein and Alyssa Sutherland). The investigation soon reveals that there are many victims of the surgeon and his girlfriend and the sexual assault case soon turns into a murder case when a body is found where a sexual assault is taped. Things soon take a rather bizarre and shocking twist when the girlfriend of the surgeon’s former identity is discovered, changing how the case goes when she proves to be not who she claims to be.
446	12	"Dear Ben"	Jean de Segonzac	Julie Martin & Matt Klypka	January 17, 2019	2012	4.24
When a violent serial rapist who has not attacked in several years strikes again, the Special Victims Unit is called in to investigate the heinous crime. Through further investigation, Stone discovers that his father, Benjamin Stone, was investigating the case several years ago back when Stone was a boy. Meanwhile, Benson’s problems with Noah’s behavior continues and Stone gives a helping hand to Benson in controlling Noah’s behavior, and finally gets to the root of the problem.: Inspired by the Golden State Killer.
447	13	"A Story of More Woe"	Ray McKinnon	Julie Martin & Céline C. Robinson	January 31, 2019	2013	4.60
The Special Victims Unit is called in after a widowed father of two teenage girls is found murdered. The older daughter (Zoe Margaret Colletti) claims she murdered her father out of anger after he sexually assaulted her sister, but when custody of the sisters is suddenly handed over to their neighbor (Alex Kramer) who has a close relationship with the younger sister, the detectives become suspicious. Meanwhile, Rollins gives birth to a baby girl and breaks up with Pollack after he proposes marriage.
448	14	"Part 33"	Alex Chapple	Michael Chernuchin	February 7, 2019	2014	4.15
Stone starts the court trial of a woman (Amy Rutberg) who murdered her husband, who was a police officer. The woman claims her husband was abusive to her, often raping, beating and intimidating her. The complicated case forces the Special Victims Unit to take sides and fight over what they think is right, particularly Rollins and Carisi, who have a heated argument with each other over their thoughts on the case. Meanwhile, the case brings back traumatic memories for Benson, who starts remembering her ordeal with William Lewis several years ago.
449	15	"Brothel"	Michael Pressman	Julie Martin & Ryan Causey	February 14, 2019	2015	4.18
When a prostitute working at a brothel is found dead in an alleyway, the Special Victims Unit is called in to investigate. They soon find themselves trying to figure out whether she was murdered or if she had a drug relapse, got depressed and killed herself. In order to solve the case, Tutuola teams up with a detective from Vice squad and his past to try and figure out what actually happened to the prostitute and also try and take down what could be a vicious sex trafficking ring which could involve someone the Special Victims Unit know.
450	16	"Facing Demons"	Timothy Busfield	Richard Sweren & Allison Intrieri	February 21, 2019	2016	4.00
The Special Victims Unit is called in after a young man who was molested as a child commits suicide and try to investigate who was his rapist. The detectives soon discover that the man was in the same little league team that former squad member and Benson’s ex Brian Cassidy was in. Remembering Cassidy telling him he was molested as a child by his little league coach, Stone visits Cassidy and asks for his help to catch what could be a serial child molester who has been molesting boys for decades.
451	17	"Missing"	Constantine Makris	Michael Chernuchin & Matt Klypka	March 14, 2019	2017	4.11
The Special Victims Unit are called in after a little girl is found in the trunk of an abandoned car. The girl says her kidnapper wore yellow the same color as Big Bird and the detectives discover that she was adopted by two gay men after a surrogacy arrangement. After interrogating many suspects, the detectives find the girl's kidnapper (Jim Schubin), whom they learn may not be who he claims to be and uncover a years kept secret kept by his mother (Chloe Webb), who may not be as innocent as she says she is.
452	18	"Blackout"	Chris Misiano	Peter Blauner	March 21, 2019	2018	4.29
While at a police charity ball, defense attorney Nikki Staines is drugged and sexually assaulted and the Special Victims Unit are called in to investigate what happened. When Staines states she believes her rapist was a police officer, the detectives soon uncover what could be a whole line of corrupt lawyers and officers, which not only affects how the already complicated case goes but also Staines’s reputation as a defense attorney and Benson’s reputation and career.
453	19	"Dearly Beloved"	Lucy Liu	Richard Sweren & Allison Intrieri	April 4, 2019	2019	3.93
The Special Victims Unit are called in after a woman crashes a wedding claiming that the groom, a therapist, raped her. The detectives talk to several people, who claim that the woman has stalked them at times after sending inappropriate messages on Facebook and Instagram, which challenges the woman’s integrity. However, when it is discovered that the woman is pregnant with her alleged rapist's baby, the woman confides to Benson that she doesn’t know if she can have the baby due to being unable to love it and an upset Benson tells Rollins something that she overheard her mother say years ago.
454	20	"The Good Girl"	Jean de Segonzac	Lawrence Kaplow & Brianna Yellen	April 11, 2019	2020	3.94
The Special Victims Unit are called in to investigate a complicated pregnancy case involving a thirteen year old girl. Benson works to try and find out who the baby’s father is, but getting the answer becomes complicated when the teenage girl is reluctant to expose the baby’s father. She refuses to speak to Benson and the Special Victims Unit, prompting Benson to believe that the baby’s father might be someone close to the teenage girl who may have taken advantage of her.
455	21	"Exchange"	Michael Pressman	Michael Chernuchin & Jordan Barsky	April 25, 2019	2021	3.63
The Special Victims Unit are called in after a fifteen-year-old exchange student from Italy claims she was sexually assaulted by a cab driver. Just as the cab driver is caught and the detectives think that the case is over, shocking video footage of the victim having sex with two older men emerges, therefore launching a statutory rape case. Soon enough the Special Victims Unit uncovers disturbing secrets from the victim's past which could completely change how the case goes.
456	22	"Diss"	Alex Chapple	Michael Chernuchin & Allison Intrieri	May 2, 2019	2022	3.95
When a pop star (Amber Stevens West) is assaulted in her own home, the Special Victims Unit are called in to investigate what happened. The detectives soon find out that the pop star’s husband (Orlando Jones) had a heated public feud with another competing recording artist (Snoop Dogg), which could easily have been the motive for the assault. Just as Tutuola gets deep into the case, it is discovered that his family ties to one of the suspects of the assault and as a result, Stone, who is taking the case seriously, orders Benson to take him off the case.
457	23	"Assumptions"	Fred Berner	Teleplay by : Julie Martin & Richard Sweren; Story by : Michael Chernuchin	May 9, 2019	2023	3.66
A Muslim woman appears to be assaulted in a synagogue and two teenage boys are seen fleeing the scene, which prompts the Special Victims Unit to come in and investigate. The case quickly is confirmed as a hate crime and controversy quickly erupts. However, the case takes a shocking twist when it is discovered that the Muslim woman may not be telling the exact truth. Later in the episode it's revealed that the Muslim woman was raped by her ex-husband. He knew she was a lesbian and due to Sharia Law he believed she was still his wife. Meanwhile, Benson receives news that Rob Miller, who raped defense attorney Nikki Staines, has been released from prison on bail, leaving Benson shocked and dismayed.
458	24	"End Game"	Alex Chapple	Michael Chernuchin & Julie Martin	May 16, 2019	2024	3.58
When the dead body of a teenage girl is found in the Hudson River, the Special Victims Unit are called in. Strongly suspecting Rob Miller, Benson and Stone vow to take down one of the most clever and powerful criminals the Special Victims Unit has ever faced by taking Miller to trial after he threatens and intimidates several people, including the detectives and his rape victim Nikki Staines. Meanwhile, Stone decides to leave the Special Victims Unit after finding himself unable to cope with the cases investigated by the precinct.

== Ratings ==
Viewership and ratings per episode of Law & Order: Special Victims Unit season 20
No.	Title	Air date	Rating/share (18–49)	Viewers (millions)	DVR (18–49)	DVR viewers (millions)	Total (18–49)	Total viewers (millions)
1	"Man Up"	September 27, 2018	1.1/4	5.09	1.1	3.33	2.1	8.42
2	"Man Down"	September 27, 2018	1.1/4	5.09	1.1	3.33	2.1	8.42
3	"Zero Tolerance"	October 4, 2018	1.0/4	4.21	1.0	3.14	2.0	7.36
4	"Revenge"	October 11, 2018	0.9/4	4.44	1.0	3.13	1.9	7.58
5	"Accredo"	October 18, 2018	1.0/5	3.95	1.0	3.15	2.0	7.10
6	"Exile"	October 25, 2018	0.9/4	4.22	0.9	3.08	1.8	7.30
7	"Caretaker"	November 1, 2018	0.9/4	4.62	1.0	3.23	1.9	7.85
8	"Hell's Kitchen"	November 8, 2018	0.9/4	4.44	0.9	3.05	1.8	7.49
9	"Mea Culpa"	November 15, 2018	0.8/3	4.00	1.0	3.12	1.8	7.12
10	"Alta Kockers"	November 29, 2018	0.7/3	3.88	0.9	3.43	1.7	7.32
11	"Plastic"	January 10, 2019	0.8/3	3.99	1.0	3.32	1.8	7.32
12	"Dear Ben"	January 17, 2019	0.9/4	4.24	0.9	3.44	1.8	7.68
13	"A Story of More Woe"	January 31, 2019	0.9/5	4.60	1.0	3.37	1.9	7.96
14	"Part 33"	February 7, 2019	0.8/4	4.15	0.9	3.43	1.7	7.59
15	"Brothel"	February 14, 2019	0.8/4	4.18	1.0	3.32	1.8	7.51
16	"Facing Demons"	February 21, 2019	0.9/4	4.00	1.0	3.39	1.9	7.40
17	"Missing"	March 14, 2019	0.7/4	4.11	0.9	3.09	1.6	7.20
18	"Blackout"	March 21, 2019	0.8/4	4.29	0.9	3.04	1.7	7.34
19	"Dearly Beloved"	April 4, 2019	0.8/4	3.93	0.9	3.08	1.7	7.02
20	"The Good Girl"	April 11, 2019	0.7/4	3.94	0.9	2.95	1.6	6.89
21	"Exchange"	April 25, 2019	0.7/4	3.63	0.8	3.05	1.5	6.68
22	"Diss"	May 2, 2019	0.8/4	3.95	0.9	3.04	1.6	6.99
23	"Assumptions"	May 9, 2019	0.7/4	3.66	0.9	3.00	1.6	6.65
24	"End Game"	May 16, 2019	0.7/4	3.58	0.9	3.17	1.6	6.75
