= LD50 (disambiguation) =

LD50 is the median lethal dose in toxicology.

LD50 may also refer to:

- L.D. 50 (album), an album by Mudvayne
- LD 50 Lethal Dose, a 2003 UK film
- "LD50", an episode of NCIS: Los Angeles
