= Peter Stone (Chicago Justice and Law & Order: Special Victims Unit) =

Fictional character on the Chicago franchise and Law & Order: Special Victims Unit

- Chicago Justice and Law & Order: Special Victims Unit character
- Peter Stone in a promotional image for Chicago Justice
- First appearance: "Justice" (CPD); "Fake" (CJ); "Speak Your Truth" (CM); "The Undiscovered Country" (SVU)
- Last appearance: "Emotional Proximity" (CPD); "Tycoon" (CJ); "Speak Your Truth" (CM); "End Game" (SVU)
- Portrayed by: Philip Winchester

In-universe information
- Seasons (Note: A bold number indicates that the character was a series regular in the season.): CPD: 3, 4; CJ: 1; CM: 3; SVU: 19, 20

Peter Stone is a fictional character portrayed by Philip Winchester. Stone was initially a guest character as part of a backdoor pilot in the third season of the police procedural Chicago P.D. Following the success of the backdoor pilot and his character, Winchester was cast as a main character in Chicago Justice, a spin-off of Chicago P.D. During the character's time in the Chicago franchise a guest appearance was also made in Chicago Med. Following the cancellation of Chicago Justice, Winchester was cast as a series regular in Law & Order: Special Victims Unit. He departed SVU ahead of the series' twenty-first season.

== Personal life ==
Stone is the son and second child of former Law & Order character Benjamin Stone, and the younger brother of Pamela Stone. He has an aunt Carol who raised him for most of his life. He was born circa 1980.

Before becoming a lawyer, Stone was a pitcher for the Chicago Cubs. He was forced to retire from baseball after tearing his UCL, and decided to follow in his father's footsteps by going to law school and becoming an assistant district attorney. Nevertheless, he has described having a difficult relationship with his workaholic father, who he felt cared more about prosecuting criminals than about his own family.

== Character overview ==
=== Chicago P.D. (2016) ===
Cook County Assistant State's Attorney Peter Stone is first introduced in the third-season episode of Chicago P.D., entitled "Justice", which served as a backdoor pilot for Chicago Justice.

=== Chicago Justice (2017) ===
Following the success of the episode the character went on to appear as a main character in Chicago Justice. Stone has spent most of his adult life in Chicago, primarily as a prosecutor with the State's Attorney's office in Cook County.

=== Other Chicago appearances (2016–17) ===
The character later went on to make further guest appearances in Chicago P.D.. Stone also played a major role in a three-part crossover among Chicago Fire, P.D., and Justice. Following the cancellation of Chicago Justice, the character went on to reprise his role as a guest star in Chicago Med.

=== Law & Order: Special Victims Unit (2018–19) ===
In his first appearance on Law & Order: SVU, Stone attends his father's funeral. He is later appointed by District Attorney Jack McCoy (Sam Waterston) as special counsel prosecuting Rafael Barba (Raúl Esparza) in the mercy killing of a terminally ill child, in the episode "The Undiscovered Country". When Olivia Benson (Mariska Hargitay) confronts him during the trial, he admits he sympathizes with Barba but cannot ignore the prosecution because he fears it will set a bad example to others. She urges him to talk to Barba and be more reasonable with him. This later results in Barba's being found not guilty, a result Stone ultimately approves.

After Barba resigns, traumatized by the case, Stone takes over as the Assistant District Attorney overseeing the New York County District Attorney's Special Victims Unit. His stint begins with a rocky start, involving initial tension with the rest of the members of the SVU team, but he eventually grows into the job.

He also reveals that he has an older sister named Pamela (Amy Korb) who has paranoid schizophrenia and is committed to a psychiatric hospital, where he has visited her every week after their father's death. When Pamela begins to show signs of memory loss and believes that he is their father, Stone reluctantly increases her medication on her doctor's advice, concerned that stopping the medication could cause her to become suicidal. In the episode "Remember Me Too", Pamela is abducted by sex traffickers whom Stone is trying to put behind bars. They eventually mortally wound Pamela during a brutal shootout with the SVU team; she dies in her devastated brother's arms. Benson tries to comfort Stone and as he tells her that the last thing his sister said was his first name, he breaks down crying in her arms.

In the season 20 premiere "Man Up", it is revealed that Stone has been drinking heavily and having anonymous sex with various women to numb the pain of Pamela's death, for which he feels responsible. He also turns down Benson's offer to talk about his feelings about this, despite her trying to be there for him.

In "Mea Culpa", Stone is accused of rape by a woman named Sarah Kent (Alexandra Breckenridge). He asks Benson to investigate the accusation and she arrests him after only questioning Kent, although Kent has no memory of a rape actually occurring and is unwilling to press charges. Stone is released on his own recognizance after being arraigned. He is later held hostage by Sarah's husband Gary (Kevin Kane) but he is able to talk Gary into turning over the gun and surrendering to police. Stone refuses to press charges against him. It is soon discovered that Stone's friend Reggie Gregg (Austin Peck) was the actual rapist. Benson arrests Gregg for rape, resulting in the charges against Stone being dropped.

The episode "Dear Ben" concerns a cold case that Stone's late father had worked on regarding a serial rapist who calls himself "Infinity". Stone later takes up the case and successfully brings the rapist to justice.

In "Endgame", Stone prosecutes serial rapist Rob Miller (Titus Welliver) for sexually assaulting defense attorney Nikki Staines (Callie Thorne), but the case is weak. When Miller threatens Benson and her adopted son Noah, Stone decides to stage a prosecution based on fake charges designed to get Miller to admit to what he had done, with Staines’ help. The ruse works; even though Stone's plan is exposed in court, it angers Miller enough that he inadvertently admits to assaulting Staines. Stone then tells Benson that he is leaving the SVU bureau because she "became more important to him than the case he was trying," that he lost perspective, and, while he does not regret it, he cannot risk it happening again.

== Development ==
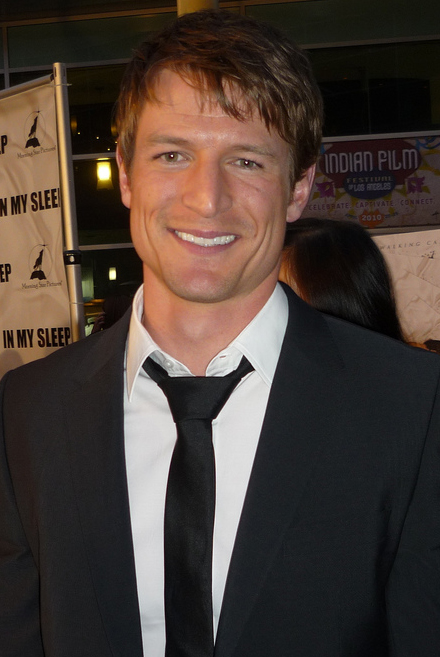
Peter Stone is portrayed by actor Philip Winchester (above).

=== Casting ===
Philip Winchester was first announced to be starring in Chicago Law (later renamed Chicago Justice) on February 19, 2016. It was later reported that Winchester would first appear in a backdoor pilot episode embedded in Chicago P.D. Winchester continued to guest star in P.D. and made also an appearance in Chicago Med. Following the cancellation of Justice, it was announced that Winchester would move to Law & Order: SVU in a starring capacity. Winchester replaced Raúl Esparza's character, Rafael Barba, on SVU who departed the series in Winchester's debut episode. On March 29, 2019, Winchester announced that he would not be returning for the twenty-first season of SVU.

=== Creation ===
Peter Jankowski, COO and President of Wolf Films, stated "When we cast Philip, the idea going in wasn't to make that character Ben Stone's son but as we saw it develop and we saw the actor, it made sense."
