= Rafael Barba =

Fictional character on Law & Order: Special Victims Unit

- Law & Order character
- First appearance: "Twenty-Five Acts"; October 10, 2012
- Last appearance: "A Final Call at Forlini’s Bar"; May 19, 2022
- Portrayed by: Raúl Esparza

In-universe information
- Seasons: SVU: 14, 15, 16, 17, 18, 19, 21, 22, 23; OC: 2

Rafael Barba is a fictional character portrayed by Raúl Esparza, who joined the cast of the long-running NBC crime drama series Law & Order: Special Victims Unit on a recurring basis during the 14th season episode "Twenty-Five Acts". The character was promoted to a series regular for the 15th season and exited the series during season 19. He has since made guest appearances in the 21st, 22nd and 23rd seasons and a brief appearance in the spin-off series Law & Order: Organized Crime.

== Character overview ==
Assistant District Attorney Rafael Barba transfers from the Brooklyn District Attorney's office to Manhattan after requesting what he refers to as a "lateral move". Barba is brought in to work with the Special Victims Unit at the behest of temporary SVU captain, Steven Harris (Adam Baldwin), due to the aftermath of a case involving sex trafficking and police corruption. He is an aggressive, often ruthless prosecutor who puts pressure on not only the detectives, but also the victims and witnesses, in order to win cases. He is well-read, and fond of referencing authors such as Tom Wolfe and Kurt Vonnegut.

During his time as the Special Victims Unit ADA, he becomes a close friend of Detective (later Sergeant, Lieutenant and now Captain) Olivia Benson (Mariska Hargitay), and they serve as each other’s confidantes during difficult cases. She leans on him especially hard when her adopted son Noah is kidnapped. She affectionately calls him “Rafa”. However, their relationship is badly strained when he represents Richard Wheatley (Dylan McDermott), the gangster who ordered the murder of Kathy Stabler (Isabel Gillies), the wife of Benson's former partner, Elliot Stabler (Christopher Meloni).

== Character within SVU ==
In his first case with the Special Victims Unit, he prosecutes a rape similar to a best-selling erotic novel, Twenty-Five Acts by Jocelyn Paley (Anna Chlumsky), who is the rape victim. Barba tells the detectives to uncover anything and everything about Paley and her rapist, talk show host Adam Cain (Roger Bart). After rushing to put Paley on the stand to testify, Barba and the detectives discover that Paley did not write the book, which forces Barba to get creative with the trial. Barba taunts Cain with a belt tied around his neck, resulting in him lashing out and choking Barba from behind the same way he did to Paley. After this, the jury finds Cain guilty.

Barba goes head to head with the Suffolk County District Attorney, Pam James (Jane Kaczmarek), in the episode "Beautiful Frame", after a Manhattan rape victim is charged with the murder of her ex-boyfriend in Suffolk County. Benson questions the charges against the woman and gathers enough evidence for Barba to put corrupt DA investigator Michael Provo (Enver Gjokaj) on trial for the same murder, as Barba and James race to get a conviction before the other. Barba and the SVU detectives uncover a scandal within the Suffolk County DA's office, as Provo set the young woman up for the murder. Barba offers to spare James' office of more embarrassment as long as Provo is convicted for the murder in Suffolk County.

In the episode, "Funny Valentine", Barba and the detectives have a tough time convincing pop star Mischa Green (Tiffany Robinson) to testify against her abusive boyfriend, hip-hop artist Caleb Bryant (Eugene Jones). After a shooting that kills her manager with Bryant as a suspect, Barba and Benson convince Green to testify in the grand jury. But when she finally takes the stand, she tells Barba that her boyfriend was not at the scene and instead says Barba and Benson put those words in her mouth. After Bryant escapes prosecution, the couple flees on a vacation, where Bryant ultimately beats Green to death.

Towards the end of the fourteenth season, Barba becomes close with the squad, and they rely on his legal advice on many of their assigned cases. In the episode "Undercover Blue", Benson goes to Barba in an attempt to provide evidence that could potentially clear her boyfriend, Detective Brian Cassidy (Dean Winters), of rape. Barba already had the evidence and, although he was not prosecuting the case, keeps a close eye on the trial. In the season finale, "Her Negotiation", Detective Amanda Rollins (Kelli Giddish) calls Barba in to the precinct on a weekend for a class-B misdemeanor because she believes that the offender, William Lewis (Pablo Schreiber), is more dangerous than the charges. It turns out that Lewis is a serial rapist and murderer, and Barba makes an unsuccessful attempt to convict him. In the season 15 episode "Psycho/Therapist", Barba tries Lewis once again, this time for several rape/murders and for kidnapping Benson. The case becomes complicated when Lewis opts to represent himself in order to further torment Benson. Barba is able to convict Lewis on most of the charges, but not of attempting to rape Benson.

In the season 15 episode "October Surprise", SVU pursues Barba's childhood friend Alex Muñoz (Vincent Laresca), a frontrunner for the mayor of New York City, for indecent exposure and possession of child pornography. Although Barba is initially reluctant to aid in the investigation, he becomes more focused on doing the right thing when it becomes clear that Muñoz is guilty. Barba gives Muñoz the opportunity to "get ahead of it" by alerting him to the severity of the charges, which irritates the detectives, particularly Detective Nick Amaro (Danny Pino). Barba is ultimately forced to bring charges against Muñoz, despite repeated warnings and threats from Muñoz, his manager, and Muñoz's wife, who happens to have had a relationship with Barba. A handful of details regarding Barba's early life was also revealed in "December Solstice"; it is mentioned there that he grew up in the Bronx and attended Harvard University on a scholarship.

From season 16 until Barba's exit from the series, there is a running joke in which Detective Dominick "Sonny" Carisi, Jr. (Peter Scanavino), who is studying to become a lawyer, annoys him with unsolicited legal advice and information about the legal system that Barba already knows. Occasionally though, Carisi's needling results in Barba making a connection or realization that allows him to win the case.

The series also provides a few details about Barba's family. He had a difficult relationship with his father; he says that the elder Barba "has been dead 15 years, and my hand still curls into a fist whenever I think of him". It is later revealed that his father died after falling into a diabetic coma. Regardless of how much he disliked his father, Barba could not bring himself to take him off life support, and so he simply let the disease take its course. He and his mother, Lucia (Mercedes Ruehl), take care of Barba's grandmother Catalina (Anne Betancourt). When Catalina can no longer take care of herself, Barba tries to have her moved to a retirement community against her will, rather than have Lucia leave her job as the principal of a charter school to take care of her. When Catalina dies of a heart attack shortly before the move, Barba blames himself.

In the seventeenth season episode "Intersecting Lives", Barba goes after Riker's Island correctional officer Gary Munson (Brad Garrett), who is raping female inmates. As Barba brings charges against him, the entire prison guard system turns against him. A hit man threatens Barba in the courthouse elevator and on the steps outside following a press conference. In the following episode, "Heartfelt Passages", Barba reveals he had been receiving threats even before the Munson case; Rollins and Carisi proceed to help him identify them and assign him a security detail.

In the season 18 episode "Know It All," Barba suddenly recuses himself from the investigation of rape/murder suspect David Willard (Chris Diamantopoulos), for whom Benson has requested a search warrant, and does not tell her the reason for his choice. Benson gets the warrant from another ADA, and a search of Willard's office turns up a disposable cell phone. One of its received calls is from a young girl, who proves to have a connection to Barba; her mother, a heroin addict, had been a witness in one of his cases years earlier. He had paid the mother to secure her testimony, knowing she would use the money to buy drugs, and she later died of an overdose. Barba started sending money to the daughter every month, and realizes that Willard must have hacked into his bank account in order to use this information against him. The episode ends with Barba uncertain about his future in the DA's office; in the next episode, "The Newsroom", he is back in the courtroom, telling Benson that he has just finished serving a suspension.

Barba leaves the DA's office midway through the nineteenth season, in the episode "The Undiscovered Country." His regrets over having left his comatose father on life support lead him to disconnect the life support system for Drew Householder, an infant in a persistent vegetative state whose parents have been feuding about whether to end the child's life. DA Jack McCoy (Sam Waterston) insists on prosecuting him for murder. Although he is acquitted, Barba decides that it is time to move on, after 21 years as a prosecutor. He is replaced by Peter Stone (Philip Winchester).

Barba is later seen in the 21st season episode "Redemption in Her Corner", video chatting with Benson while he is investigating voter fraud in Iowa. He wishes Benson an early happy birthday and promises to meet up with her in New York at a later time. Barba is next seen in the 22nd season episode "Sightless in a Savage Land", having returned to New York to work with the Innocence Project. Benson and Sergeant Fin Tutuola (Ice-T) ask him for help negotiating a lenient plea bargain for a military veteran charged with murdering his daughter's rapist. He meets with Carisi, who has since become an ADA, and who refuses to discuss a plea deal unless Barba himself defends the veteran. Barba agrees, and he and Carisi end up competing against each other in the courtroom. After the veteran is found guilty of manslaughter, Barba has a friendly drink with Carisi and leaves to visit his mother before she goes to Florida. On the way out, he bumps into Benson, who notes that he used his defense for the client more as a way to find redemption for euthanizing Drew. Barba responds that he is still trying to find a way to move on from his past. After affirming that they miss each other, the two wish each other a Happy New Year.

In the 23rd season episode "People vs. Richard Wheatley", Barba angers both Benson and her former partner, Detective Elliot Stabler (Christopher Meloni), by defending mobster Richard Wheatley (Dylan McDermott), the man who ordered the murder of Stabler's wife Kathy (Isabel Gillies). During the trial, he argues that the NYPD framed Wheatley, and casts doubt on the prosecution's case by questioning Stabler about his PTSD and his relationship with Wheatley's ex-wife Angela (Tamara Taylor). After Benson tells Barba how betrayed she feels by his actions, Barba realizes that he has gone too far, and declines Wheatley's offer to become his consigliere after the trial. After a mistrial occurs with the jury deadlocked, Barba appears in the spin-off series Law & Order: Organized Crime episode "The Christmas Episode", in which he visits Wheatley in prison to inform him that the murder charges are being dropped and that he is being released from prison. Though Wheatley asks Barba to reconsider his offer, Barba still refuses to associate with the crime boss any further.

Barba next appears in the 23rd season finale, "A Final Call at Forlini’s Bar". Benson, who has not spoken to Barba in months, finds out that Rollins asked him to represent a woman who killed her abusive husband after seeing that the woman's public defender is not up to the task. Barba agrees, and once again faces off against Carisi in court. Barba manages to prove that the woman's actions were motivated by brain trauma she suffered as a result of her husband's abuse, winning an acquittal and getting her help from social services. While Barba wins the case, however, his relationship with Benson is still strained. He meets with her for a drink, and they have an emotional conversation in which she says that she is still hurt by his decision to represent Wheatley, while he says that she is letting her emotional ties to Stabler cloud her judgment. While they do not part as friends, however, they admit that they miss each other. Showrunner Julie Martin, in an interview for Today, said that she did not want the last scene between Barba and Benson to imply a romantic connection between them, but rather a deep love as friends. Raúl Esparza, during the celebration for 25 years of SVU, confirmed that former showrunner Warren Leight wrote a script with which "he wanted to do something that would upset the Benson and Stabler fans".

== Development ==
I don't think there's anything nice about [ADA Rafael] Barba. He's kind of an a--hole, but I love him ... And that's OK. He's fundamentally a good person and gets the job done.

— Raúl Esparza on Barba's character.

Raúl Esparza was approached by Law & Order: Special Victims Unit Executive Producer Warren Leight to appear in the series as an Assistant District Attorney. Leight had previously worked with Esparza in the 2012 Broadway production Leap of Faith and Leight insisted on writing a character for Esparza that would complement his acting strengths, "because he wanted to keep working together". He initially had reservations about accepting the role, as he didn't believe that it would satisfy him as much as his stage work did, and was concerned that television acting required a different set of skills. However, Esparza believed the role would offer him "recovery" time from the Leap of Faith Broadway production, which "fell apart". He signed up for the role, as "it was the best time to step away from a place where my heart was broken".

Prior to being cast as Barba in SVU, Esparza appeared in a 2009 episode of Law & Order: Criminal Intent, in which he portrayed an ADA with a dark secret, and a 2010 episode of Law & Order, in which he portrayed a tabloid journalist.

On July 12, 2013, it was announced that Esparza would join the main cast as Barba, in the series' fifteenth season. On the promotion, Leight said, "Making him [Esparza] a series regular is a small way of acknowledging his enormous contribution to our show". Barba is the first regular ADA on the series since Alexandra Cabot (Stephanie March) in the eleventh season, and the first male.

In the thirteenth episode of season 19, Esparza departed the cast. He chose to leave the role, saying "I've done six seasons, I felt like it was time to go. I had explored a lot of what I thought Barba was about. I just felt it was time to move on."

== Reception ==
The New Yorker television critic Emily Nussbaum praised Esparza's portrayal of the character, stating that, "[Esparza] is a major asset as the dandyish A.D.A. Rafael Barba".

According to Esparza, Barba's "flashy, high-fashion suits ... and snappy suspenders" are popular online, with Kate Stanhope of TV Guide adding that the character's "designer duds have been a hit with fans".

== Credits ==
Esparza has been credited in 119 episodes of SVU (appearing in 90) as Barba, making him the 2nd longest serving ADA in the Law & Order franchise history after Jack McCoy.

Seasons	Years	Episodes																								
Seasons	Years	1	2	3	4	5	6	7	8	9	10	11	12	13	14	15	16	17	18	19	20	21	22	23	24	25
14	2012–13																									
15	2013–14	×			×	×						×			×		×	×			×	×				
16	2014–15				×		×	×		×					×							×	×			
17	2015–16			×			×	×	×		×									×						
18	2016–17							×	×			×	×					×								
19	2017–18		×																							
21	2019–20																									
22	2020–21																									
23	2021–22																									
Seasons	Years	1	2	3	4	5	6	7	8	9	10	11	12	13	14	15	16	17	18	19	20	21	22	23	24	25

Regular cast

×	Regular cast + no appearance

Recurring cast

Guest cast

No credit + no appearance

No episode
