= Philip Winchester =

American actor

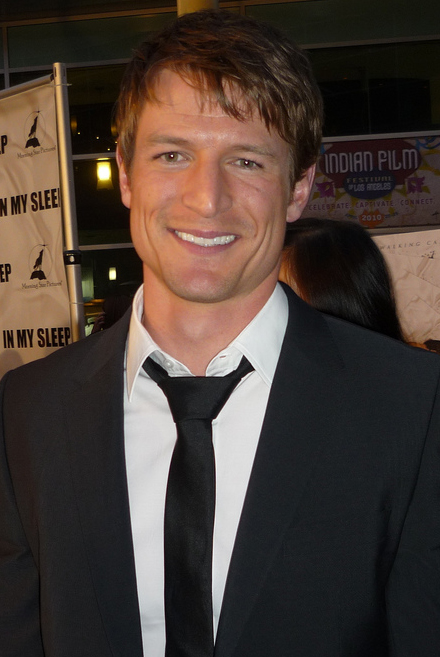
- Winchester at the In My Sleep premiere in 2010
- Born: Montana, U.S.
- Education: London Academy of Music and Dramatic Art
- Occupation: Actor
- Years active: 1998–present
- Spouse: Megan Coughlin (m. 2008)
- Children: 2

Philip Winchester is an American actor. He is known for his roles as Sgt. Michael Stonebridge in Strike Back (2011–2018), and Peter Stone in Chicago Justice (2017) and Law & Order: Special Victims Unit (2018–2019). He also appeared in The Patriot, The Hi-Line, LD 50 Lethal Dose, Thunderbirds, CSI: Miami, King Lear, Flyboys, In My Sleep, The Heart of the Earth and Shaking Dream Land.

== Early life and education ==
Winchester was born in Montana. He graduated from Belgrade High School in 1999. He then lived and worked in London, England (his mother's home country), and attended the London Academy of Music and Dramatic Art (LAMDA).

== Career ==
Winchester's acting career started with a small role in the 1998 film The Patriot, which was filmed in and around the towns of Bozeman and Ennis, Montana. After graduating from high school, he began to take roles in plays, including that of Edmund in King Lear opposite Ian McKellen, in the 2007 Royal Shakespeare Company production.

In 2003, he starred in the independent film The Telephone, which was filmed in Bristol and produced by Robert Finlay. In 2008, he was cast as Robinson Crusoe in the NBC action TV series Crusoe. In 2009, he was cast in Maneater, a two-part Lifetime miniseries starring Sarah Chalke.

Winchester has also appeared in the films Solomon Kane (2009) (as a former member of the title character's crew, turned freedom-fighter) and In My Sleep (2010) (as the lead), and the Syfy TV mini-series Alice.

From 2010, he has played the role of Frank Stanton, parallel universe fiancé of Olivia Dunham, in the Fox TV series Fringe. From 2011, he has appeared as Leontes in the Starz series Camelot. Other credits include the second, third, fourth and fifth seasons of Strike Back along with a guest appearance in season six. The series follows the adventures of two Section 20 agents, Sgt. Michael Stonebridge (Winchester) and American former Delta Force officer Damien Scott (Sullivan Stapleton). He also starred with Wesley Snipes and Charity Wakefield in the NBC drama The Player in 2015. He also starred in Chicago Justice as lead prosecutor Peter Stone. This character then became the Assistant District Attorney (ADA) on Law & Order: Special Victims Unit during season 19 after the previous ADA Rafael Barba (Raúl Esparza) resigned. In March 2019, Winchester announced that he would be leaving SVU ahead of its twenty-first season, making season twenty his last on the show.

== Personal life ==
Winchester married Megan Coughlin in 2008. The two met in their hometown of Belgrade, Montana and were described as being "high-school sweethearts" by E! News. They have two daughters who were born in 2015 and 2019.

== Filmography ==
=== Film ===
Year	Title	Role	Notes
1998	The Patriot	Young Militiaman	
1999	The Hi-Line	Cafe Waiter	
2003	LD 50 Lethal Dose	Vaughn	
2004	Thunderbirds	Scott Tracy	
2006	Shaking Dream Land	Robert	
2006	Flyboys	William Jensen	
2007	The Heart of the Earth	Robert Coyle	
2009	Solomon Kane	Henry Telford	
2010	In My Sleep	Marcus	
2016	Undrafted	Fotch	
2020	Rogue	Joey Kasinski	
2021	Endangered Species	Jack Halsey	
2022	A Week In Paradise	Sam	
2024	Shadow Land	Brett Cahill	
2024	Duchess	Robert McNaughton	
2025	Man with No Past	Jack	
2025	Red Sonja	Rathi	
2026	The Internship	Dick Jones	

=== Television ===
Year	Title	Role	Notes
2004	Commando Nanny	Miles Ross	Unknown episodes
2005	CSI: Miami	Chris Allen	Episode: "Urban Hellraisers"
2008	King Lear	Edmund	Television film
2008–2009	Crusoe	Robinson Crusoe	13 episodes
2009	Maneater	Aaron Mason	2 episodes
2009	Alice	Jack Chase	2 episodes
2010–2011	Fringe	Frank Stanton	4 episodes
2010	Warehouse 13	Marine/Cowboy/Gladiator/Mad scientist	Episode: "Beyond Our Control"
2010	A Walk in My Shoes	Marcus	Television film
2011	Camelot	Leontes	10 episodes
2011–2018	Strike Back	Sgt. Michael Stonebridge	42 episodes
2014	24: Live Another Day	Colonel Shaw	3 episodes
2015	The Player	Alex Kane	9 episodes
2016–2017	Chicago P.D.	A.S.A./A.D.A. Peter Stone	3 episodes
2017	Chicago Justice	A.S.A./A.D.A. Peter Stone	13 episodes
2017	Chicago Med	A.S.A./A.D.A. Peter Stone	Episode: "Speak Your Truth"
2018–2019	Law & Order: Special Victims Unit	A.S.A./A.D.A. Peter Stone	Main cast, 36 episodes
2022	Leopard Skin	Max Hammond	All 8 episodes
2025	Ransom Canyon	Sheriff Dan Brigman	Guest
2025–2026	NCIS: Origins	Mason Franks	5 episodes
