= Ngo Okafor =

Nigerian actor, boxer, model, fitness trainer and owner of Iconoclast Fitness

- Born: Ngoli Onyeka Okafor; December 30, 1974 (age 51); Framingham, Massachusetts, United States
- Education: University of Connecticut
- Occupations: Model; Actor
- Years active: 2004—present
- Organization: Champion Spirit Foundation
- Height: 1.96 m (6 ft 5 in)
- Spouse: Kindra Hanson (2013–present)
- Website: ngookafor.com

Ngoli Onyeka Okafor // (born December 30, 1974) is an American-born Nigerian actor, former boxer and model who is the internet's most downloaded black male model.

== Early life and education ==
Okafor was born in Framingham, Massachusetts while his father was completing his PhD at Harvard University. His family returned to Nigeria shortly before Okafor's second birthday. Okafor grew up in Enugu State. He suffered from respiratory illnesses, such as asthma and pneumonia, and read Charles Dickens to pass the time while convalescing at the University of Nigeria Teaching Hospital. After completing his secondary school education in Enugu, he proceeded to the University of Connecticut in 1994, where he studied Computer Science.

== Career ==
Upon graduation, Okafor worked for the Connecticut Department of Transportation, and as a model and actor. He was featured on the covers of Fortune, Vogue, W, ESPN Magazine and The Source. In 2005, at the age of 31, Okafor began boxing at Kingsway Boxing. He won two back-to-back Golden Gloves Championships in 2008 and 2009. In 2010, Okafor founded Iconoclast Fitness, a training gym in the Flatiron District of Manhattan.

== Filmography ==
=== Films ===
- Phat Girlz (2006) as Gentleman in Club
- Jeremy Fink and the Meaning of Life (2011) as Sebastian
- A Dog Named Gary (2012) as Rob
- True Story (2015) as Ibrahim
- Oxford Gardens (2015)

=== TV series ===
- One Life to Live (2006) as Coby Cates
- Six Degrees (2007) as Greg
- Kings (2009) as Prison Guard
- CollegeHumor Originals (2011)
- The Six (2011) as Chuck
- Law & Order: Special Victims Unit (2012–2019) as Trainer Wyatt
