= Millie Weaver =

American political commentator

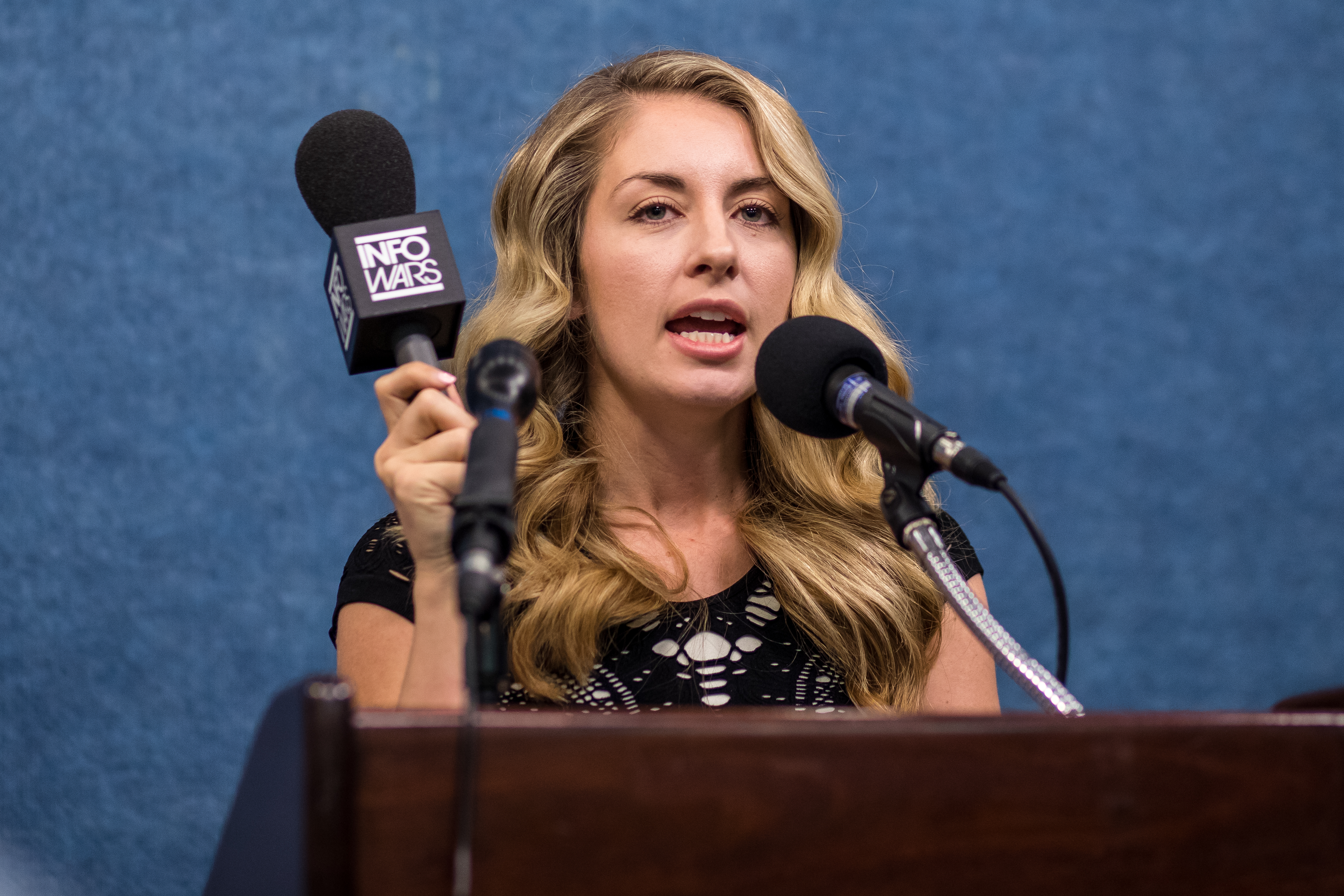
- Weaver in 2018
- Born: 6 February 1991 (age 34); San Bernardino, California
- Years active: 2012–present
- Known for: Commentator; conspiracy theorist
- Website: www.millennialmillie.com

Millicent Faith Weaver, also known as Millennial Millie (born 6 February 1991), is an American right-wing political commentator known for espousing conspiracy theories.

== Background ==
Weaver is best known for expressing controversial conspiratorial beliefs, formerly appearing on right-wing mass media, such as InfoWars.

Weaver made a 2020 documentary called Shadowgate, alleging that a shadow government was responsible for an anti-Trump plot and was orchestrating global events. PolitiFact called Shadowgate an "unfounded conspiracy theory."

Weaver was arrested in August 2020 on charges of theft and assault. Supporters raised over $170,000 for her, claiming she was arrested by the "deep state" over the revelations in Shadowgate. Texas-based right-wing political commentator, conspiracy theorist and radio host Alex Jones fired Weaver from InfoWars after the August 2020 arrest. Weaver tweeted on 21 October 2020 that the charges had been dropped.

Data released in the 6 October 2021 leak of data from streaming platform Twitch showed that Weaver had taken in $9,300 from her channel on the platform from the start of 2021 up to the leak.
