= Lorenzo Scott =

American artist

Lorenzo Scott (born 1934 in West Point, Georgia) is a contemporary American artist whose work gained prominence in the late 1980s.

== Early life ==
Lorenzo Scott was born on July 23, 1934, in the small, bustling mill village and railroad hub of West Point, Georgia. When his mother, who worked in the fields supplying cotton to the local mills, lost her job during the Depression, the family moved to Atlanta in search of work.

One of eleven children, Lorenzo tells of a time in his youth when he first saw his mother make a sketch, and knew even at an early age that he wanted to be able to draw like that. Though Scott attended public school until the tenth grade, he admits to being more interested in drawing than schoolwork. "I've been sketching all my life since I was about five," he said, "I got my study lookin' at the museum".

In his youth, Lorenzo's family lived across the street from a Southern Baptist church where they were active members. Here, the young Lorenzo developed the lifelong devout Christian faith that underpins both his art and his life. He often tells stories of extraordinary events that have occurred in his life which stem from his strong faith. In one such story, he reflects on a time when as a child he would observe the comings and goings of churchgoers across the street, and how after observing a funeral gathering at the church, he asked his mother "how come people had to die." He thought if he stayed awake, he wouldn't die, so one night he got his mom to let him stay up all night.

== Art career ==
As a young man, Scott worked as a house painter and in construction, and did not make his first oil painting until the age of twenty-five. It was another twenty years, after he visited New York in 1968 and discovered the paintings of the old masters at the Metropolitan Museum of Art, before he was recognized as a serious artist. So enamored with the paintings of the Renaissance Italian artists, Scott spent hours by himself studying their techniques and style, pouring over the images he found both in books, and in the museums, then experimenting with oil glazing, composition, and learning how to balance color and contrast. According to Karen Towers Klacsmann, curator for research at the Morris Museum of Art and organizer of the Lorenzo Scott Exhibition in 2007, "The path that Scott chose is similar in many ways to a guild apprenticeship in the medieval, Renaissance, or Baroque eras with one distinct difference -- there was no master artist to guide him during his term of apprenticeship. With a talent for drawing, acute observation, and an iron will, he looked to actual paintings to silently reveal the methods and techniques of artists who had produced spectacular works of art hundreds of years ago."

As Scott tells it, "In 1968, I went to New York. I seen them peoples painting on canvas on the street and I went to see the Metropolitan Museum of Art. I thought, that what I need to do ... paint. So I went back and started painting on canvas. It was hard. I keep cussing an' tryin'. When I got back to Atlanta, I'd go to museums downtown like the High Museum to look at the antique paintings, see how they did the oils. Then I'd go back an' study how they do the eyes an' the nose. I wore that place out!"

Finding an outlet for his paintings was a struggle for Scott until one night a turning point came in the form of a vision. "I was comin' from a construction job. I got so tired an', on that Sunday night, a light came on my bed. Sure did! First it came an' it went away. I kinda race up outta the bed, then it came again an' got real bright around my bed, an' that's how in the beginning my paintings started sellin'. It was like the Lord was talkin' to me. I thought I was goin' to heaven when I saw that light and I was happy and I feel myself jumpin' in the bed. Then I found out later that it wasn't just my body jumpin', it was my spirit too. For some reason or other, somethin' was happenin' there that day. It tol' me where to look at. And then my paintings started selling. I sold a painting to a guy for little or nothing. He sold it to someone an' he tried to find me. An one day I was handin' out flyers and he saw one and he called me. It's strange how my name got to his door. He bought a couple more pictures from me an' came back later and brought somebody else with him."

Revelations: Visionary Content in the Work of Southern Self-Trained Artists at the Atlanta College of Art in 1986 was the first exhibition in which Scott's work was included. The first one-man show of his work at a national museum was at the Springfield Museum of Art in Ohio in 1993 (An Unexpected Orthodoxy: The Paintings of Lorenzo Scott). Through the efforts of Bert Hunecke, Scott's work has since been accepted into the permanent collections of museums in New York and Washington. He received the Folk Art Society of America's Award of Distinction in 2002, which named him a "Modern Renaissance Painter of Folk Art."

== Prominence ==
Two Atlanta art collectors and an Atlanta gallery owner were important in the discovery and early sales of Lorenzo Scott's art. While living in East Point, where he rented a house on Dill Avenue (which Scott fondly refers to as his "Dill Avenue Gallery"), he was able to hang his art on the walls, so that it could be shown and sold. Atlanta collectors William "Bill" Arnett came to the Dill Avenue location and took a number of paintings off the wall and placed them on the floor to be purchased. He bought a magnificent piece of painted furniture. These works would eventually become part of his Soul's Grown Deep project created to introduce the work of "so-called folk or outsider artists of the black American South [which] were a coherent cultural movement and constituted a crucial chapter in world art."

At some time near or after the Arnett purchases, Bert Hunecke learned about Scott and visited the Dill Avenue location. He was so struck with the art that he agreed to buy the entire inventory in the house. Hunecke was instrumental in getting several of Scott's paintings into the Smithsonian and High Museums.

Also, one day in the late 1980s, the gallery owner Mark Karleson met Scott hawking his paintings on the streets of Atlanta, and decided to exhibit some of the artist's work in his Modern Primitive Gallery. Scott was, however, accustomed to selling his work directly "for cash" and did not use a consignment method that most galleries prefer. Karelson would buy the paintings directly, then sell them at the gallery to a variety of collectors. One of the most important sales was of a large number of paintings to the House of Blues Art Collection.

== Artistic practice ==
Scott's paintings often address religious and visionary subject matter, in addition to the more secular themes: rural landscapes, African American children, and occasional social and/or political issues. He paints both large- and small-scale work in oil on canvas or wood, through a process he has developed himself after years of experimentation. Much of his life, he has worked out of his house, though for several years he maintained a small studio in Decatur, Georgia, where he would create his own frames as well as the paintings. His "elaborate, gold-leaf, Renaissance style" frames are an essential element of his work, says Lynne Browne, Senior Correspondent for the Folk Art Messenger. He once described the process of constructing them for her: "The frames take a long time. I get some lumber from Home Depot, some Bondo [car body repair material], spray paint - Pittsburgh quick-dry gold enamel. I use this jigsaw to cut out all the shapes. I use sticks, old pencils, little screwdrivers and other things to make lines on the Bondo. The frame is a work of art." Browne, in turn, noted the "gentleness" in Scott's treatment of his subject matter: "Scott reveals a careful attention to process, in his meticulous layering of oil pigments, and also in the finishing touch of the amazing hand-built, sculptured frames that complement each one of his paintings. I think of the Italian Renaissance masters when I study his work".

Kathy Moses, in her book Outsider Art of the South, makes the point that Scott's fascination for the methods and iconography of the Old Masters is not simple repetition: "He goes beyond those stylistic and cultural antecedents to create something highly individual. Through visual immersion with Renaissance Italian examples and repeated experimentation, he determinedly taught himself the technique of oil glazing, how to compose forms on a plane, and how to balance color and contrast. He applies oil in thin glazes on canvas or wood panel to achieve the solemn serenity of the fourteenth-century Italian Giottoesque portraits and figures and the Catholic themes dealing with Christ's life and the Madonna. His depictions are aesthetically quite refined."

Scott has been called "a self-taught genius," and his work Lazarus was referred to as "one of the museum's treasures" in the Treasures of American Folk Art from the Museum of American Folk Art. His work has been exhibited in over 40 American museums and is included in the permanent collections of the Smithsonian Institution's American Art Museum in Washington, D.C., the American Folk Art Museum in New York, the High Museum of Art in Atlanta, the Tubman African American Museum in Macon, and the Morris Museum of Art in Augusta.

== Exhibitions ==
Museum Exhibitions

Lorenzo Scott's work has been widely exhibited in museums (and similar public spaces), including one-person, theme, group, and traveling exhibitions including:

- 1986 Atlanta College of Art Gallery, Atlanta, GA
- 1989 La Grange Museum of Art (the date needs verification)
- 1991 Quinlin Art Center and Gainesville College, Gainesville, GA
- 1993 Springfield Museum of Art, Springfield, IL
- 1993 Sidney Miskin Gallery – Baruch College, New York, NY
- 1995 Nexus Contemporary Art Center, Atlanta, GA
- 1996 Rockford Art Museum, Rockford IL
- 1996 Schomburg Center for Research in Black Culture New York, NY
- 1997 Chicago Cultural Center and Intuit, The Center for Intuitive and Outsider Art
- 1997 Milwaukee Art Museum, Milwaukee, WI
- 1999-2000 American Visionary Museum, Baltimore, MD
- 1999 Center for Contemporary Art, St. Louis, MO
- 1999 High Museum of Art, Atlanta, GA
- 2000 Smithsonian American Art Museum (Traveling Exhibition, 2000 - 2003)
- 2000 Mary Brogan Museum of Art and Science, Tallahassee FL
- 2000 Tampa Museum of Art, Tampa FL
- 2000 Kalamazoo Institute of Arts, Kalamazoo, MI (Traveling Exhibition, 2000 -2004)
- 2000 Coastal Discovery Museum, Hilton Head Island, SC
- 2001 High Museum of Art, Atlanta, GA
- 2001 The Art Museum at Florida International University, Miami, FL
- 2001 Tacoma Art Museum, Tacoma WA
- 2001 Yellowstone Art Museum, Billings MT
- 2001 Cummer Museum of Art, Jacksonville, FL
- 2001 Marsh Art Gallery, University of Richmond Museums, Richmond, VA (Traveling Exhibition, 2001 - 2002)
- 2002 Spruill Gallery (public exhibition space)
- 2002 High Museum of Art, Atlanta, GA
- 2002 Fort Wayne Museum of Art, Fort Wayne, IN
- 2002 Longwood Center for the Visual Arts, Longwood College, Farmville, VA
- 2002 Terrace Gallery, City of Orlando, Orlando, FL
- 2002 Art Museum of Western Virginia, Roanoke, VA
- 2002 Columbia Museum and Gibbs Planetarium, Columbia, SC
- 2002 Tubman African-American Museum, Macon, GA
- 2002 Savannah College of Art and Design, Savannah, GA
- 2002 Beach Institute, Savannah, GA
- 2002 The Arkansas Arts Center, Little Rock, AR (Traveling Exhibition 2002–2005)
- 2002-3 American Folk Art Museum, New York, NY
- 2002-3 Peninsula Fine Arts Center, Newport News, VA
- 2002-3 Senator John Heinz Pittsburgh Regional History Center, Pittsburgh, PA
- 2003 Kennesaw State University Fine Arts Gallery
- 2003 Morris Museum of Art, Augusta, GA
- 2003 Stedman Art Gallery, Camden NJ
- 2003 Southern Ohio Museum, Portsmouth, OH
- 2003 Memphis Art Museum (Traveling Exhibition 2003–2006)
- 2003 Marjorie Barrick Museum (University of Nevada, Las Vegas)
- 2003 Telfair Museum of Art, Savannah, GA
- 2003 Kennesaw State University, Fine Arts Gallery
- 2004 Morris Museum of Art, Augusta, GA
- 2004 Paris Gibson Square Museum of Art, Great Falls, MT
- 2004 Terrace Gallery, City of Orlando, FL
- 2004 Defoor Centre, Atlanta, GA. The Defoor Centre is known as "The West Venue" since July, 2021
- 2005 Loveland Museum and Gallery, Loveland, CO
- 2007 Morris Museum of Art, Augusta, GA
- 2007-8 Georgia Museum of Art, Athens, GA
- 2009 High Museum of Art, Atlanta, GA
- 2011 Boca Raton Art Museum (Collection of Ann and Ted Oliver)
- 2011 Myrtle Beach Art Museum (Collection of Ann and Ted Oliver)
- 2011 Hickory NC Art Museum (2 paintings donated by Ann and Ted Oliver)
- 2012 Heaven+Hell exhibition, February 10 – June 30, Intuit, Chicago, IL (The art from the "Hell half" of the exhibition)
- 2012 Heaven+Hell exhibition, February 10 – June 30, Loyola University Museum of Art, Chicago, IL (The art from the "Heaven half" of the exhibition)
- 2013-4 Madison-Morgan Cultural Center, Madison, GA
- 2015-16 Columbia Museum of Art, Columbia, SC

Museum Permanent Collections

- American Folk Art Museum, New York City (Gift of Jane and Bert Hunecke) (Promised gift of Harvie B. and Charles l. Abney, P9.2000.1)
- Asheville Art Museum, Asheville NC (Gift of Ted Oliver)
- Columbus Museum of Art, Columbus, GA (Gift of Carl Mullis)
- Georgia Museum of Art, Athens, GA (Gift of Carl Mullis)
- Hickory Museum NC (Gift of Ted Oliver)
- High Museum of Art, Atlanta GA (1 gift of Jim Farmer, 1 gift of Randy Siegel)
- Morris Museum of Art, Augusta GA (3 works, 2 were gifts of Jim Farmer)
- Rockford Art Museum, Rockford, IL (Sellen, 2000, p. 66-67)
- Smithsonian American Art Museum, Washington DC (2 works, gifts of Bert and Jane Hunecke)
- St. James Place Folk Art Museum, Robertsville, NC (Sellen, 2000, p. 76-77)
- Tubman African-American Museum (Gift of Jim Farmer)

Gallery Exhibitions and Other Showings

Lorenzo Scott's work has also been shown in many commercial galleries, collections, internet sites and exhibitions including:

- America Oh Yes!, Hilton Head, South Carolina
- America Oh Yes!, Washington, D.C.
- Ask Art (internet site)
- AXA Gallery, New York, NY
- Barbara Archer Gallery, Atlanta, Georgia
- Erica Kay Gallery, Tucker Georgia
- Folk Art Messenger
- Folk Fest, Atlanta, Georgia
- Galerie Bonheur, St. Louis, Missouri
- Ginger Young Gallery, Chapel Hill, North Carolina
- Grey Carter Objects of Art, Alexandria, Virginia
- High Museum of Art, Art Partners Group (2014 Retrospective exhibition held by the Lorenzo Scott Foundation, Stone Mountain, GA)
- Janine Taylor Folk Art Gallery, Winter Park, Florida
- Knoke Fine Arts, Marietta, Georgia
- Leslie Muth Gallery, Santa Fe, New Mexico
- Lorenzo Scott Fine Art Gallery, Atlanta, Georgia
- Lorenzo Scott Gallery, Ponce de Leon Avenue, Atlanta, Georgia
- Mason Murer Gallery, Atlanta, Georgia
- Modern Primitive Gallery, Atlanta, Georgia
- Marcia Weber Art Objects, Montgomery, Alabama
- Oliver's Southern Folk Art, Hendersonville, North Carolina
- Orange Hill Gallery, Atlanta, Georgia
- Primitive Eye Gallery, Scottsdale, Georgia
- Shade Gallery, Atlanta, Georgia
- Slotin Folk Art Auction, Buford, Georgia
- The Lorenzo Scott Project, Stone Mountain, Georgia
- Woodward Gallery, New York, N.Y.
- Who Fest, Atlanta, Georgia
