= LD 50 Lethal Dose =

- DVD cover
- Directed by: Simon De Selva
- Written by: Matthew McGuchan
- Produced by: Alistair MacLean-Clark; Basil Stephens
- Starring: Katharine Towne; Melanie Brown; Tom Hardy; Ross McCall
- Cinematography: Robin Vidgeon
- Edited by: Kant Pan
- Music by: Michael Price
- Production companies: Four Horsemen Films; Isle of Man Film; Crossfire Productions
- Distributed by: Buena Vista; First Look International; Touchstone
- Release date: 9 October 2003
- Running time: 97 minutes
- Country: United Kingdom
- Language: English
- Budget: $8 million

LD 50 Lethal Dose is a 2003 horror film directed by Simon De Selva, produced by Alistair MacLean-Clark and Basil Stephens and written by Matthew McGuchan. A group of animal rights activists set off to free an imprisoned colleague from a terrifying ordeal but their rescue mission turns into a series of twisted and mind bending incidents. Starring Tom Hardy, Katharine Towne and Melanie Brown.

== Plot ==
A group of animal activists, who call themselves LD 50, break into an animal research facility, when Gary gets caught in a bear trap. Unable to free Gary, the rest of the group flees, leaving Gary to take the blame. A year later, the group has since disbanded until an encrypted e-mail from Gary arrives asking for help. Danny, who has been visiting Gary in prison, tells the group that Gary has traded his body for experiments in exchange for a reduced sentence.

The group, still stricken by guilt one year later, eagerly reunites to rescue Gary. They also pick up two new recruits – a stoner and an ex-Marine. At the remote lab where Gary is being kept, the group discovers the place abandoned, and soon finds themselves locked in a subterranean level full of labyrinthine hallways and experiment chambers. They also discover that a powerful electrical force is stalking them, and it has full control of the complex. The force plays havoc with the would-be rescuers, turning their righteous cause into a death trap. They must work together to outsmart and defeat the unseen evil.

== Cast ==
- Katharine Towne as Helen
- Melanie Brown as Louise
- Tom Hardy as Matt
- Ross McCall as Gary
- Toby Fisher as Justin
- Leo Bill as Danny
- Philip Winchester as Vaughn
- Stephen Lord as Spook

== Production ==
Filmed on location in London, England and Isle of Man. Filming started on 27 October 2002 and went until 31 January 2003. It has been reported that this was the first ever feature film to be shot on Kodak VISION2 film.
