= Raúl Esparza =

American actor (born 1970)

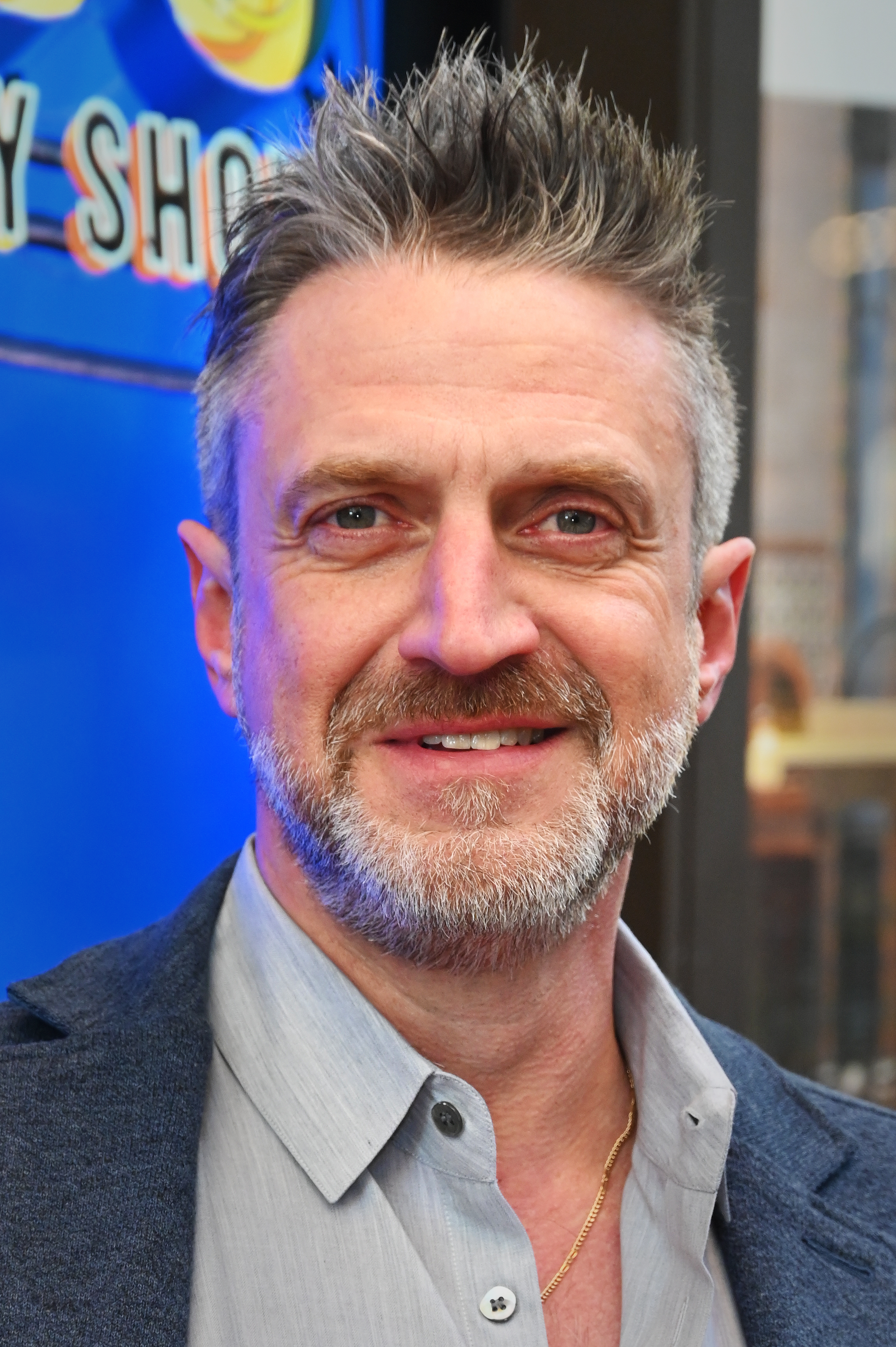
- Esparza in 2025
- Born: Raúl Eduardo Esparza; October 24, 1970 (age 55); Wilmington, Delaware, U.S.
- Education: New York University
- Occupation: Actor
- Years active: 1993–present
- Spouse: Michelle Perez (m. 1994; div. 2008)
- Website: www.raulesparza.com

Raúl Eduardo Esparza (born October 24, 1970) is an American actor. Considered one of Broadway's most prominent leading men since the 2000s, he is best known for his Tony Award-nominated performance as Bobby in the 2006 Broadway revival of Company and for his television role as New York Assistant District Attorney (ADA) Rafael Barba in Law & Order: Special Victims Unit, where he had a recurring role in Season 14 and was promoted to a series regular in Seasons 15 to 19.

He made his Broadway debut in 2000 as Riff Raff in the revival of The Rocky Horror Show. Subsequently, he starred as Jonathan in the original Off-Broadway production of Tick, Tick... Boom! and Caractacus Potts in the original Broadway production of Chitty Chitty Bang Bang in 2005. He received Tony nominations for his roles as Philip Sallon in the Boy George musical Taboo in 2004; Bobby in the musical comedy Company in 2006; Lenny in Harold Pinter's play The Homecoming in 2008; and Charlie Fox in David Mamet's play Speed-the-Plow in 2009. Most recently, he starred in the Off-Broadway productions Road Show and Seared in 2019, and Oliver! in 2023. He is set to return to Broadway as the titular role in Galileo in November 2026.

Esparza has been nominated in all Tony categories for which an actor is eligible. He is highly regarded for his versatility on stage, having performed musicals by Andrew Lloyd Webber, Stephen Sondheim, Kander and Ebb, Boy George, the Sherman Brothers and in plays by Mamet, Pinter, William Shakespeare, Tom Stoppard, and others.

His film work includes Sidney Lumet's Find Me Guilty and Wes Craven's My Soul to Take, and his television credits include roles on The Path, Medium, Hannibal and Pushing Daisies. He narrated the audiobook for Stephen King's Under the Dome as well as several others, and he has sung in concerts across the country.

== Early life ==
Raúl Esparza was born in Wilmington, Delaware, to Cuban parents, María Elena Cecilia García y Gutiérrez and Raúl Esparza y Rues, who had fled Fidel Castro's regime. While his paternal grandfather had been established in Castro's sugar ministry, his father's family grew disillusioned with the government and, in 1966, his father and grandmother escaped to the U.S. by boat, while his grandfather defected through Spain. Esparza's maternal grandfather had originally moved to Cuba from Figueres, Alt Empordà, Catalonia, Spain.

Esparza was raised in Miami, Florida. He graduated from Belen Jesuit in 1988 and won a Silver Knight Award in Drama that same year. In 1992, Esparza received a Bachelor of Fine Arts in Drama and a Bachelor's degree in English from New York University's Tisch School of the Arts.

Esparza participated in the genealogy program Finding Your Roots, during Season 8, Episode 3. He learned during the episode that his Catalan great-great-grandparents founded Garcia de Pou Restaurant Supply Store in Madrid, still owned and operated by members of his family. He also learned that another branch of his family came from the small town of Navata, Girona, Catalonia, Spain, where they can be traced back fourteen generations.

== Career ==
=== Theatre ===
==== Broadway theatre ====
Esparza first drew attention with his performance in the 2000 Broadway revival of The Rocky Horror Show, which won him the Theatre World Award. Esparza's other Broadway credits include Cabaret (2001), Taboo (2003), Chitty Chitty Bang Bang (2005), and Stephen Sondheim's Company (2006). He received a nomination for the Tony Award for Best Featured Actor in a Musical at the 58th Tony Awards and won a Drama Desk Award for Outstanding Featured Actor in a Musical for his performance in Taboo. His performance in Company earned him a second Tony nomination, this time for Best Actor in a Musical at the 61st Tony Awards, as well as his second Drama Desk Award, this time for Outstanding Actor in a Musical. Beginning in November 2007, he appeared in Harold Pinter's play The Homecoming and was nominated for the Tony Award for Best Featured Actor in a Play at the 62nd Tony Awards. In 2008, he played Charlie Fox in the revival of David Mamet's Speed-the-Plow co-starring Jeremy Piven and Elisabeth Moss on Broadway. His performance in Speed-the-Plow earned him a nomination for the Tony Award for Best Actor in a Play at the 63rd Tony Awards, making him the second performer (after Boyd Gaines) to be nominated in all four acting categories a performer is eligible for at the Tonys, although he has yet to win one.

Esparza appeared in a limited-engagement revival of Tom Stoppard's Arcadia, which began previews at the Ethel Barrymore Theatre on February 25, 2011, and opened on March 17, 2011.

Esparza appeared in the musical Leap of Faith in the role of the "Reverend" Jonas Nightingale. He was involved in the workshop in 2008, the out-of-town tryout at the Ahmanson Theatre (Los Angeles) in 2010, and the Broadway production in 2012, for which he received a 2012 Drama Desk Award nomination for Outstanding Actor in a Musical.

It was announced in February 2026 that Esparza will make his return to Broadway, for the first time in 13 years, in the musical Galileo. Esparza will reprise his role as the show's title character from his run at the Berkeley Repertory Theatre in 2024, where the show made its world premiere. Galileo with play at the Shubert Theatre (Broadway), with previews starting November 10, 2026, and opening night set for December 6, 2026.

==== Other theatre ====
In 1999, Esparza played Che in the national tour of Evita, opposite Natalie Toro. The tour was intended to open on Broadway, but failed to do so. In 2001, he appeared Off-Broadway in tick, tick... BOOM! by Jonathan Larson, garnering a Drama Desk Award nomination for Outstanding Actor in a Musical. He appeared in two musicals by Stephen Sondheim, Sunday in the Park with George and Merrily We Roll Along at the 2002 Kennedy Center Sondheim Celebration. He also appeared as the Arbiter in the Actors Fund of America concert of Tim Rice's Chess in September 2003.

In 2009, Esparza starred in a production of William Shakespeare's Twelfth Night at the Delacorte Theater (New York) with Anne Hathaway, from June 25 through July 12. He starred as J. Bowden Hapgood in the New York City Center Encores! staged concert production of Anyone Can Whistle from April 8 to 11, 2010, opposite Sutton Foster as Fay Apple and Donna Murphy as the Mayoress Cora Hoover Hooper.

In July 2013, Esparza starred in a production of The Cradle Will Rock at the New York City Center.

In February 2018, Esparza played Freddie Trumper in the Kennedy Center's revival of Tim Rice's Chess. From October to December 2018, Esparza played the title role in Classic Stage Company's Off-Broadway production of The Resistible Rise of Arturo Ui. He was nominated for the 2019 Drama Desk Award for Best Actor for the role.

In July 2019, Esparza appeared in a production of Road Show at the New York City Center. In October of the same year, Esparza played Harry in the off-Broadway comedy Seared by Theresa Rebeck.

In April 2020, he was a host, executive producer, and performer in Take Me to the World: A Sondheim 90th Celebration, a virtual concert in honor of the 90th birthday of composer Stephen Sondheim benefiting the charity organization ASTEP (Artists Striving to End Poverty).

In December 2022, Esparza was a guest narrator at Disney's Candlelight Processional at Walt Disney World. In 2023, he starred as Fagin in Oliver! in New York's Encores! two-week run. In 2023, it was announced that he would star in the world premiere of the musical Galileo at Berkeley Repertory Theatre in summer 2024.

=== Television ===
In 2007, Esparza had a recurring role on the TV show Pushing Daisies as traveling salesman Alfredo Aldarisio, a role originally given to Paul Reubens. In 2009, Esparza recorded the audiobook Under the Dome by Stephen King. He has done narration for The House of the Scorpion by Nancy Farmer and The Book of Unholy Mischief by Elle Newmark. In January 2010, Esparza performed opposite Lucie Arnaz, Desi Arnaz Jr., and Valarie Pettiford at the 92Y's Lyrics and Lyricist event honoring Desi Arnaz and his orchestra, Babalu: The American Songbook Goes Latin. In 2010, Esparza appeared as Abel Plenkov in Wes Craven's My Soul to Take.

From 2013 to 2015, Esparza appeared in the recurring role of Dr. Frederick Chilton in Hannibal. He appeared in the 2016 film Custody, written and directed by James Lapine, as Luis Sanjaro an Administration for Children's Services agent.

==== Law & Order: Special Victims Unit ====
In 2012, Esparza became a recurring actor on the long-running NBC drama series Law & Order: Special Victims Unit as Manhattan Assistant District Attorney Rafael Barba, starting in the third episode of the show's 14th season, "Twenty-Five Acts". He appeared in 11 episodes of the show's 14th season. On July 17, 2013, he was promoted to series regular for the show's 15th season. His character became the first series-regular ADA since Stephanie March's character Alexandra Cabot in the 11th season and the first regular male ADA in series history. His role on SVU was not his first Law & Order franchise role, however, as he had previously portrayed ADA Kevin Mulrooney in a 2009 season 8 episode, "Lady's Man", of Law & Order: Criminal Intent, and Dennis Di Palma, a suspect in "Blackmail", a 2010 season 20 episode of the original Law & Order. On February 7, 2018, Esparza left SVU in the season 19 episode "The Undiscovered Country" after six seasons on the show.

Although having left the series to return to the stage, Esparza has been back on the show, making a very brief cameo before the main title in the season 21 episode "Redemption in Her Corner". He made another guest appearance in season 22 episode "Sightless in a Savage Land," season 23, episode 9: "The People v. Richard Wheatley," and in the season 23 finale, "A Final Call at Forlini's Bar.

== Personal life ==
Esparza married Michele Marie Perez, his high-school girlfriend, in 1994. They divorced in 2008. Esparza was the subject of a New York Times profile in 2006 in which he revealed that he is bisexual.

== Filmography ==
=== Film ===
| Year | Title | Role | Notes |
|---|---|---|---|
| 2005 | ShowBusiness: The Road to Broadway | Himself | Documentary film directed by Dori Berinstein |
| 2006 | Find Me Guilty | Tony Compagna | |
| 2010 | My Soul to Take | Abel Plenkov | |
| 2011 | Trouble in the Heights | Nevada Ramirez | |
| 2016 | Custody | Luis Sanjuro | |
| 2017 | Ferdinand | Moreno (voice) | |

=== Television ===
| Year | Title | Role | Notes |
|---|---|---|---|
| 1997 | Spin City | Reporter | Episode: "In the Heat of the Day" |
| 2007 | Pushing Daisies | Alfredo Aldarisio | 2 episodes |
| 2009 | Law & Order: Criminal Intent | ADA Kevin Mulrooney | Episode: "Lady's Man" |
| 2010 | Law & Order | Dennis Di Palma | Episode: "Blackmail" |
| 2010 | Medium | David Ostrowski | Episode: "Blood on the Tracks" |
| 2011 | A Gifted Man | Phillip Romero | 2 episodes |
| 2012–2018, 2020–2022 | Law & Order: Special Victims Unit | ADA Rafael Barba | Recurring (Season 14); Main cast (Seasons 15–19); Guest (Seasons 21–23); 119 episodes |
| 2012 | 666 Park Avenue | Phillip Perez | Episode: "Hypnos" |
| 2013–2015 | Hannibal | Dr. Frederick Chilton | 12 episodes |
| 2014 | Dora and Friends: Into the City! | Big Bad Wolf (voice) | Episode: "Puppet Theater" |
| 2016–2018 | BoJack Horseman | Ralph Stilton (voice) | 8 episodes |
| 2018 | The Path | Jackson Neill | 6 episodes |
| 2020 | Take Me to the World: A Sondheim 90th Celebration | Himself (host) | TV special |
| 2020 | Poetry in America with Elisa New | Himself | Episode: "Finishing the Hat - Stephen Sondheim" |
| 2020 | The Good Fight | Bryan Kneef | Episode: "The Gang Is Satirized and Doesn't Like It" |
| 2021 | Dopesick | Paul Mendelson | Miniseries; 6 episodes |
| 2021 | Law & Order: Organized Crime | Rafael Barba | Episode: "The Christmas Episode" |
| 2022 | Candy | Don Crowder | Miniseries |
| 2023 | A Murder at the End of the World | David Alvarez | Miniseries |

== Theater credits ==
Selected credits

| Year | Title | Role | Location | Notes |
|---|---|---|---|---|
| 1998–1999 | Evita | Che | US National Tour | 20th Anniversary |
| 2000–2001 | The Rocky Horror Show | Riff Raff | Circle in the Square Theatre | Broadway |
| 2001 | Tick, Tick... Boom! | Jonathan | Jane Street Theatre | Off-Broadway |
| 2001–2002 | Cabaret | The Emcee | Studio 54 | Broadway |
| 2002 | Sunday in the Park with George | Georges Seurat / George | Kennedy Center | Washington, D.C. |
| 2002 | Merrily We Roll Along | Charley Kringas | Kennedy Center | Washington, D.C. |
| 2003 | Comedians | Gethin Price | Samual Beckett Theatre | Off-Broadway |
| 2003 | The Green Violin | Solomon Mikhoels | Prince Music Theater | Regional |
| 2003 | Chess | The Arbiter | New Amsterdam Theatre | Actors Fund of America Concert |
| 2003–2004 | Taboo | Philip Sallon | Plymouth Theatre | Broadway |
| 2004 | The Normal Heart | Ned Weeks | The Public Theater | Off-Broadway |
| 2005 | Chitty Chitty Bang Bang | Caractacus Potts | Hilton Theatre | Broadway |
| 2006 | Company | Robert | The Cincinnati Playhouse in the Park | Regional |
| 2006–2007 | Company | Robert | Ethel Barrymore Theatre | Broadway |
| 2007–2008 | The Homecoming | Lenny | Cort Theatre | Broadway |
| 2008–2009 | Speed-the-Plow | Charlie Fox | Ethel Barrymore Theatre | Broadway |
| 2009 | Twelfth Night | Orsino | Delacorte Theatre | Shakespeare in the Park |
| 2010 | Anyone Can Whistle | J. Bowden Hapgood | New York City Center | Off-Broadway |
| 2010 | Leap of Faith | Jonas Nightingale | Mark Taper Forum | Regional |
| 2011 | Arcadia | Valentine Coverly | Ethel Barrymore Theatre | Broadway |
| 2012 | Leap of Faith | Jonas Nightingale | St. James Theatre | Broadway |
| 2012 | Fun Home | Bruce Bechdel | Sundance Institute's Theater Lab | Workshop |
| 2013 | The Cradle Will Rock | Larry Foreman | New York City Center | Off-Broadway |
| 2015 | Cymbeline | Iachimo | Delacorte Theatre | Shakespeare in the Park |
| 2018 | Chess | Freddie Trumper | Eisenhower Theater | Pre-Broadway |
| 2018 | The Waves | Bernard | Powerhouse Theater | Regional |
| 2018 | The Resistible Rise of Arturo Ui | Arturo Ui | Lynn F. Angelson Theater | Off-Broadway |
| 2019 | Galileo | Galileo | Susan Stein Shiva Theater | Workshop |
| 2019 | Road Show | Wilson Mizner | New York City Center | Off-Broadway |
| 2019 | Seared | Harry | MCC Theater | Off-Broadway |
| 2020 | A Christmas Carol | Ebenezer Scrooge | - | Online |
| 2023 | Oliver! | Fagin | New York City Center | Off-Broadway |
| 2024 | Galileo | Galileo Galilei | Berkeley Repertory Theatre | Regional |
| 2025 | My Fair Lady | Professor Henry Higgins | Aspen Music Festival | Regional |
| 2025 | Jesus Christ Superstar | Pontius Pilate | Hollywood Bowl | Regional |
| 2025 | Sweet Smell of Success | J.J. Hunsecker | Lincoln Center | MasterVoices Concert |
| 2026 | The Winter's Tale | Leontes | Delacorte Theatre | Shakespeare in the Park |
| 2026 | Galileo | Galileo Galilei | Shubert Theatre | Broadway |

== Awards and nominations ==
| Year | Award | Category | Work | Result | Ref. |
|---|---|---|---|---|---|
| 2001 | Theatre World Award | | The Rocky Horror Show | Honouree | |
| 2002 | Drama Desk Award | Outstanding Actor in a Musical | tick, tick...BOOM! | Nominated | |
| 2002 | Obie Award | Distinguished Performance by an Actor | tick, tick...BOOM! | Won | |
| 2003 | Barrymore Award | Outstanding Leading Actor in a Musical | Green Violin | Won | |
| 2003 | Helen Hayes Award | Outstanding Lead Actor in a Resident Musical | Sunday in the Park with George | Nominated | |
| 2004 | Tony Award | Best Performance by a Featured Actor in a Musical | Taboo | Nominated | |
| 2004 | Drama Desk Award | Outstanding Featured Actor in a Musical | Taboo | Won | |
| 2004 | Drama League Award | Distinguished Performance | Taboo and The Normal Heart | Nominated | |
| 2005 | Outer Critics Circle Award | Outstanding Actor in a Musical | Chitty Chitty Bang Bang | Nominated | |
| 2005 | HOLA José Ferrer Tespis Award | | | Won | |
| 2006 | Cincinnati Entertainment Award | Outstanding Acting Performance by a Visiting Actor | Company | Won | |
| 2006 | Enquirer Acclaim Award | Outstanding Musical Lead Performance | Company | Won | |
| 2007 | Tony Award | Best Actor in a Musical | Company | Nominated | |
| 2007 | Drama Desk Award | Outstanding Actor in a Musical | Company | Won | |
| 2007 | Drama League Award | Distinguished Performance | Company | Nominated | |
| 2007 | Outer Circle Critics Award | Outstanding Actor in a Musical | Company | Won | |
| 2008 | Tony Award | Best Featured Actor in a Play | The Homecoming | Nominated | |
| 2008 | Drama Desk Award | Outstanding Ensemble Performance | The Homecoming | Won | |
| 2008 | Outer Critics Circle Award | Outstanding Featured Actor in a Play | The Homecoming | Nominated | |
| 2009 | Tony Award | Best Actor in a Play | Speed-the-Plow | Nominated | |
| 2009 | Drama Desk Award | Outstanding Actor in a Play | Speed-the-Plow | Nominated | |
| 2009 | Drama League Award | Distinguished Performance | Speed-the-Plow | Nominated | |
| 2009 | Outer Critics Circle Award | Outstanding Actor in a Play | Speed-the-Plow | Nominated | |
| 2011 | Drama League Award | Distinguished Performance | Arcadia | Nominated | |
| 2011 | Ovation Award | Lead Actor in a Musical | Leap of Faith | Won | |
| 2012 | Drama Desk Award | Outstanding Actor in a Musical | Leap of Faith | Nominated | |
| 2012 | Drama League Award | Distinguished Performance | Leap of Faith | Nominated | |
| 2012 | Outer Critics Circle Award | Outstanding Actor in a Musical | Leap of Faith | Nominated | |
| 2019 | Drama Desk Award | Outstanding Actor in a Play | The Resistible Rise of Arturo Ui | Nominated | |
| 2020 | Drama Desk Award | Outstanding Actor in a Play | Seared | Nominated | |
| 2020 | Drama League Award | Distinguished Performance | Seared | Nominated | |
| 2020 | Outer Critics Circle Award | Outstanding Actor in a Play | Seared | Honouree | |
| 2020 | Lucille Lortel Award | Outstanding Lead Actor in a Play | Seared | Nominated | |
