= Michael Mastro (actor) =

American Broadway and film actor (born 1962)

- Born: May 17, 1962 (age 62); Albany, New York
- Occupation: Actor

Michael Mastro (born May 17, 1962) is an American Broadway and film actor.

Mastro made his Broadway debut in Terrence McNally's Love! Valour! Compassion! in 1995. His film appearances include roles in Kissing Jessica Stein, The Night We Never Met (1993), Jungle 2 Jungle (1997), and Borough of Kings (2002).
