= Law & Order: Special Victims Unit season 13 =

Season of American television series

Law & Order: Special Victims Unit
- Season 13
- Season 13 U.S. DVD cover
- Starring: Mariska Hargitay; Danny Pino; Kelli Giddish; Richard Belzer; Ice-T; Dann Florek
- No. of episodes: 23

Release
- Original network: NBC
- Original release: September 21, 2011 – May 23, 2012

Season chronology
- ← Previous; Season 12 Next → Season 14

The thirteenth season of Law & Order: Special Victims Unit debuted on NBC on September 21, 2011, and concluded on May 23, 2012. With Law & Order: LA and Law & Order: Criminal Intent having ended in July 2011 and June 2011 respectively, this season of Law & Order: SVU was the first to be broadcast without any other running American Law & Order series, a position the series held until the nineteenth season, when Law & Order True Crime premiered.

Season 13 dealt with the departure of Detective Elliot Stabler (Christopher Meloni) from the Special Victims Unit after a shooting in the squad room. Additionally, Warren Leight, coming over from the recently concluded Law & Order: Criminal Intent, became the executive producer/showrunner for the series, replacing Neal Baer who began working on a CBS medical drama.

This is the first season to feature Mariska Hargitay as the lead in the show.

== Production ==
Warren Leight replaced Neal Baer as showrunner, after Baer moved to CBS Television Studios. NBC executive Robert Greenblatt said the network planned to "reset the tone" of the show but have the storylines "still be compelling but a little more grounded". Filming began in July 2011 and the first three episodes were finished mid-August. Production resumed on the rest of the season after Labor Day (September 5, 2011). Casting director Jonathan Strauss also took on the job of co-producer on the show; his promotion was described as a rare move in the television industry. Strauss told The Hollywood Reporter, "NBCUniversal and Wolf Films have afforded me this unique opportunity, and in television, a fairly unprecedented one, to serve as both casting director and co-producer on SVU."

The thirteenth season was Ted Kotcheff's last year serving as an executive producer for the series. He stated in an interview that the departures of Christopher Meloni and Neal Baer were the primary factors in his decision to leave as well. He also thought that a large turnover in the writing and producing staff would help the show stay fresh saying "Listen, twelve and a half years. That is enough. Let this new writer you have coming in have a blank page so that he can maybe recreate the show, and bring something new to it."

== Cast changes and returning characters ==
On May 14, 2011, TVLine reported that Mariska Hargitay would return for a thirteenth season, while Christopher Meloni had not come to terms with his contract yet. Initial reports indicated that she would appear in only the first 13 episodes, and then her character would be promoted to a supervisor position with a new detective replacing her; however, NBC chairman Bob Greenblatt clarified later that August that she would be in every episode of the season. NBC was considering Jennifer Love Hewitt to replace Hargitay. Greenblatt later told TVLine, "Jennifer Love is somebody we've been circling, but I don't know that that is going to happen at all". It was later reported that Jennifer Love Hewitt would not be coming to the show.

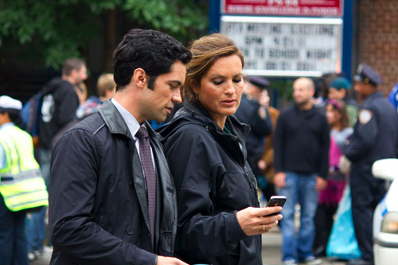
Danny Pino and Mariska Hargitay filming the fifth episode "Missing Pieces" on September 20, 2011.

Meloni's contract negotiations fell through, and on May 24, 2011, TVLine reported that he would be exiting the show. Mariska Hargitay said that "He inspired me every day with his integrity, his extraordinary talent and his commitment to the truth. I love him deeply and will miss him terribly — I'm so excited to see what he'll do next." On August 1, 2011, Greenblatt confirmed that Meloni's character would not be killed off. On June 10, 2011, co-star Ice-T renewed his contract for two more seasons (seasons 13 and 14). Kate Ward of Entertainment Weekly felt co-star Ice-T should have replaced Meloni, instead of searching for a new cast member. Actors Danny Pino, Kevin Alejandro, David Conrad, Michael Raymond-James, and later Rhys Coiro were tested June 21, opposite Hargitay as replacements for Meloni. NBC and creator Dick Wolf aimed for a younger female and male actor as they tried to extend the series' lifespan by several more years. On June 27, 2011, NBC announced that Kelli Giddish and Danny Pino would be brought on as the new series regulars.

Stephanie March and Diane Neal returned to SVU in their roles as Assistant District Attorneys Alexandra Cabot and Casey Novak respectively for "an undetermined number of episodes". Neal told TV Guide, "It's back on track to what the original SVU was intended to be, which is about sex crimes and crimes against children, it's got more of a nitty-gritty feel." She says having her and Stephanie March back provides a familiarity for viewers now that original cast member Chris Meloni is gone. "I think they should put us in the court room together!" she says about March.

On July 17, 2011, during an SVU marathon on USA Network dedicated to his character, BD Wong announced his departure from the cast on Twitter. In response to a tweet about his character's status in season 13, he wrote, "I actually do not return for Season 13, I am jumping to Awake. It's awesome!". Wong added, "I don't know if or when I'll be back [on SVU]! It was amazing to have such a cool job for 11 years and to be a real NY Actor." Wong reprised his role in the episode "Father Dearest", which aired on May 2, 2012.

Tamara Tunie was moved from the main cast credits to a "special guest" starring role.

== Cast ==
=== Main ===
- Mariska Hargitay as Senior Detective Olivia Benson
- Danny Pino as Junior Detective Nick Amaro (episodes 2–23)
- Kelli Giddish as Junior Detective Amanda Rollins
- Richard Belzer as Sergeant John Munch
- Ice-T as Senior Detective Odafin "Fin" Tutuola
- Dann Florek as Captain Donald "Don" Cragen

=== Special guest stars ===
- Stephanie March as Assistant District Attorney Alexandra Cabot
- Diane Neal as Assistant District Attorney Casey Novak
- Tamara Tunie as Medical Examiner Dr. Melinda Warner
- Dean Winters as Detective Brian Cassidy
- BD Wong as FBI Special Agent Dr. George Huang

=== Crossover stars from Law & Order ===
- Linus Roache as Bureau Chief Assistant District Attorney Mike Cutter

=== Recurring ===
- Betsy Aidem as Dr Sloane
- Max Baker as Colin Bennett
- Laura Benanti as Maria Grazie Amaro
- Ami Brabson as Judge Blake
- Stephen C. Bradbury as Judge Colin McNamara
- Andre Braugher as Defense Attorney Bayard Ellis
- Harry Connick Jr. as Executive Assistant District Attorney David Haden
- Gretchen Egolf as Defense Attorney Kendra Gill
- Allison Fernandez as Zara Amaro
- Dominic Fumusa as Jason Harris
- Gilbert Gottfried as Technical Assistance Response Unit Technician Leo Gerber
- Jacqueline Hendy as Defense Attorney Crane
- Tabitha Holbert as Assistant District Attorney Rose Callier
- Michael Mastro as Judge D. Serani
- David Pittu as Defense Attorney Linus Tate
- Ron Rifkin as Defense Attorney Marvin Exley
- Steve Rosen as Defense Attorney Michael Guthrie
- Jenna Stern as Judge Elana Barth
- Charlie Tahan as Calvin Arliss
- Karen Tsen Lee as Medical Examiner Susan Chung
- Scott William Winters as Detective Robert Dumas
- Karen Young as Dr. Meg Whitmere

=== Guest stars ===
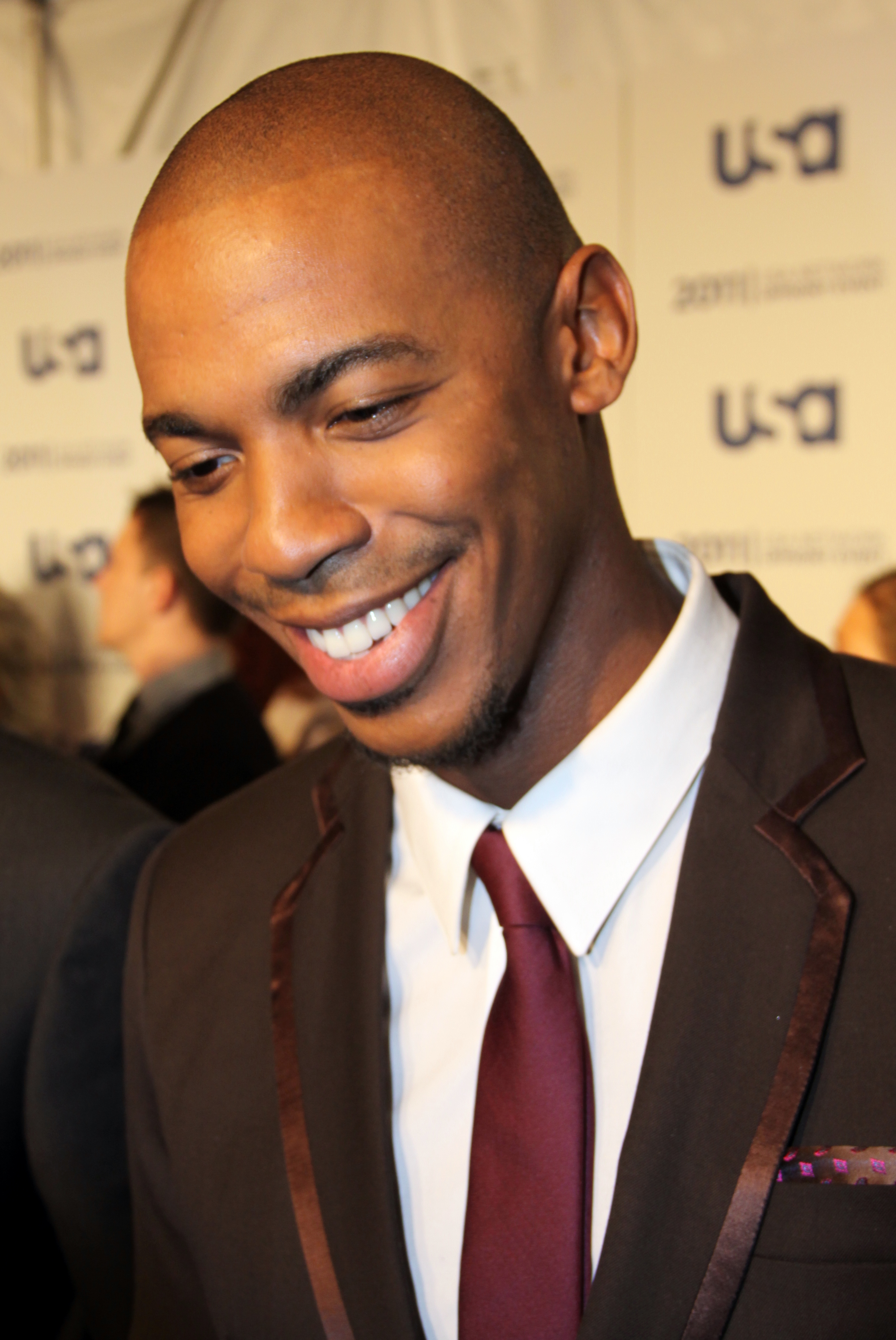
Mehcad Brooks gave a powerful performance in the episode "Personal Fouls", guest starring as a young man named Prince Miller, who was molested by his basketball coach when he was young.

Linus Roache reprised his role of ADA Michael Cutter from the original Law & Order series in the season premiere episode. Cutter has been promoted at the DA's office to Bureau Chief ADA in which he oversees the ADAs assigned to the Special Victims Unit. Showrunner Warren Leight stated, "If Cutter was a bit of a hot head in the past, the passage of time and some added responsibility in his new job has made him more mature, and perhaps a bit more jaded." Roache had to say, "I learned a lot from my time on Law & Order and it's going to be interesting to experiment with Cutter's development in this new context — I think Special Victims is going to be an area where Cutter's passion for justice can really come forth." Franco Nero guest starred in the season premiere episode as an Italian dignitary accused of rape, evoking the Dominique Strauss-Kahn arrest. Kathleen Garrett played the Italian dignitary's "stand-by-your-man" wife, Ron Rifkin played his savvy defense lawyer, similar to Strauss-Kahn's real-life lawyer, Benjamin Brafman, and Broadway and Dreamgirls star Anika Noni Rose played the victim. NBA stars Carmelo Anthony (New York Knicks) and Chris Bosh (Miami Heat) played themselves in cameo guest appearances in the episode "Personal Fouls". Mehcad Brooks played Prince Miller, a fictional basketball superstar who was once one of the coach's prodigies. Rapper/actor Heavy D played Miller's cousin and business manager, Supreme. Anthony and Bosh appeared in the opening scene and episode climax.

Kyle MacLachlan guest starred in the episode "Blood Brothers" as Andrew Raines, a charming, seductive Master of the Universe-esque philanthropist in his 50s who is part of one of New York's royal families; he is a powerful politician whose family is embroiled in a scandal. Paige Turco portrayed Andrew's (MacLachlan's) wife Kathleen, who is described as "charming, charismatic and fiercely protective of her family". MacLachlan and Turco have appeared on SVU before; MacLachlan in the season 6 episode "Conscience" as Dr. Brett Morton, a psychiatrist who was acquitted of murder for the sake of avenging his son's death. Turco was in the third season episode "Ridicule" as a woman named Pam Adler who aided in gang raping a male stripper. The episode was inspired by the infidelity and divorce of Arnold Schwarzenegger. T.R. Knight guest starred as a suspected serial rapist who consistently maintains his innocence despite overwhelming evidence. Charlie Tahan made an appearance following news that Season 13 would feature a return of Calvin Arliss, Olivia's foster child for two episodes in Season 12. In "Missing Pieces", Arliss is seen with Olivia and his elder foster family, presumably his grandparents from Vermont to whom he was sent to live with by his mother.

Andre Braugher portrayed Bayard Ellis on a recurring basis. Ellis is a high-powered defense attorney for the underprivileged who becomes a civil rights champion, as well as a close friend to Detective Olivia Benson (Mariska Hargitay). Braugher guest starred in a sixth-season episode of the original Law & Order series as Frank Pembleton, who originally worked in the Baltimore City Police Department's Homicide Squad with Detective John Munch (Richard Belzer) on Homicide: Life on the Street. New showrunner Warren Leight stated about the addition of Ellis, "I want the squad room and the legal team to have worthy adversaries, not to have straw men that they can easily take down, he's really smart, a very successful defense attorney who, in an effort to expiate his guilt, has started to defend those black and Latino youths who don't get good defense in New York. He sees an encroaching world of police and district attorney's office tyranny, and he's out to subvert it or to try to get the playing field back to where it was before 9/11." Sofia Vassilieva guest starred in the same episode in which Braugher debuted. Vassilieva portrayed Sarah Walsh, a self-reliant, bohemian girl and shining star of her middle-class suburban family who comes to New York City on a piano scholarship, and loses her inner light after she is attacked in her own apartment.

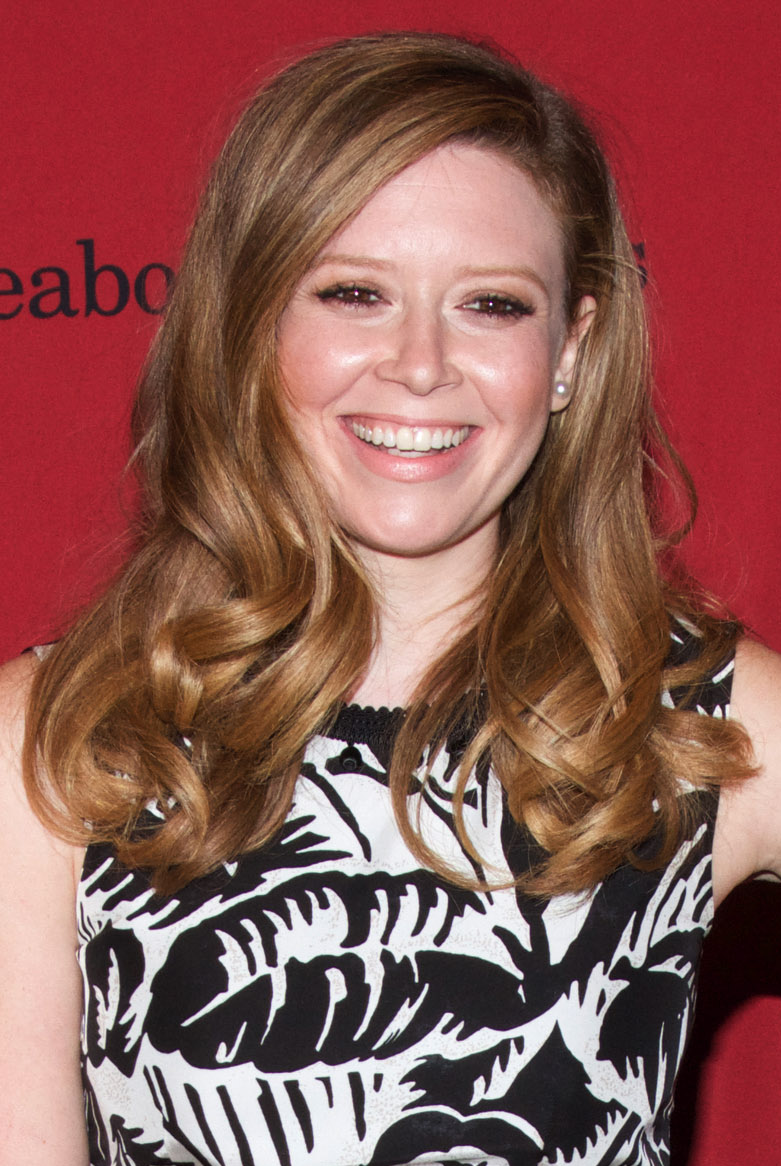
In "Educated Guess", Natasha Lyonne portrayed a mental patient named Gia who was raped inside the mental facility by someone close to her.

Timothy Busfield and Izabella Miko guest starred in "Russian Brides". Busfield played a widower whose fiancée (played by Miko) mysteriously disappears. Natasha Lyonne and Carrie Preston guest starred in the episode "Educated Guess". Lyonne played Gia, a patient at a psychiatric hospital, while Preston played her aunt. The hospital becomes a point of interest for SVU detectives due to a possible rape case. Comedian Gilbert Gottfried guest starred in the episode "Lost Traveler". Executive producer Warren Leight explained he was looking for a colorful character to take the snooze factor away from a new under-appreciated technical IT character in the precinct. "Those scenes can be dry, so I thought he'd be interesting." Warren said he would be bringing back the character, Leo Gerber, "from time to time."

Laura Benanti guest starred as Detective Nick Amaro's wife, Maria, who returns from overseas. She and Amaro must figure out where their relationship stands. Benanti first appeared in "Spiraling Down" and has the potential of a multi-episode arc. Treat Williams guest starred in the episode "Spiraling Down", in which he played Jake Stanton, a former all-star quarterback caught up in a sting operation with an underage prostitute. Stanton is represented by famed defense attorney Bayard Ellis (Andre Braugher). Beth Chamberlin guest starred as Georgia Stanton, the wife of Treat Williams' Jake Stanton. Real-life football pros Jerry Rice and Warren Sapp also made special appearances.

Kevin Pollak guest starred in the episode "Theatre Tricks", playing a judge who finds himself on the wrong side of the law. Pollak tweeted on December 2, 2011; "Big ass props to the crew and cast of Law & Order: SVU for making my first day of shooting super easy and nutty fun." Ice-T's wife, Coco Austin briefly guest starred in "Theatre Tricks" as an actress at a theater, staging a show in the vein of the popular live show Sleep No More, where the audience becomes part of the show. Coco's character played Venus, the goddess of love, Coco at one point gets very personal with another actress in the play. This episode marked Coco Austin's third appearance in Law & Order: SVU. Fisher Stevens played Ted Scott in "Theatre Tricks". Scott is involved in a Special Victims Unit investigation when an actress' sexual assault is mistaken for a performance by a theater audience. "He's a very lonely man. You'd never know it because he's always surrounded by beautiful woman," Stevens says. "He preys on his students a bit. His ego is a bit out of whack." In one of his first TV guest starring roles, Adam Driver plays Jason Roberts in this episode. His character is a suspect, but was eventually ruled out. Holt McCallany guest-starred in the episode "Official Story" marking his third time working with show runner Warren Leight, who was the showrunner of the short-lived FX series Lights Out. McCallany also guest starred in the seventh-season premiere episode of Law & Order: Criminal Intent, at the time Leight was show runner of it as well.

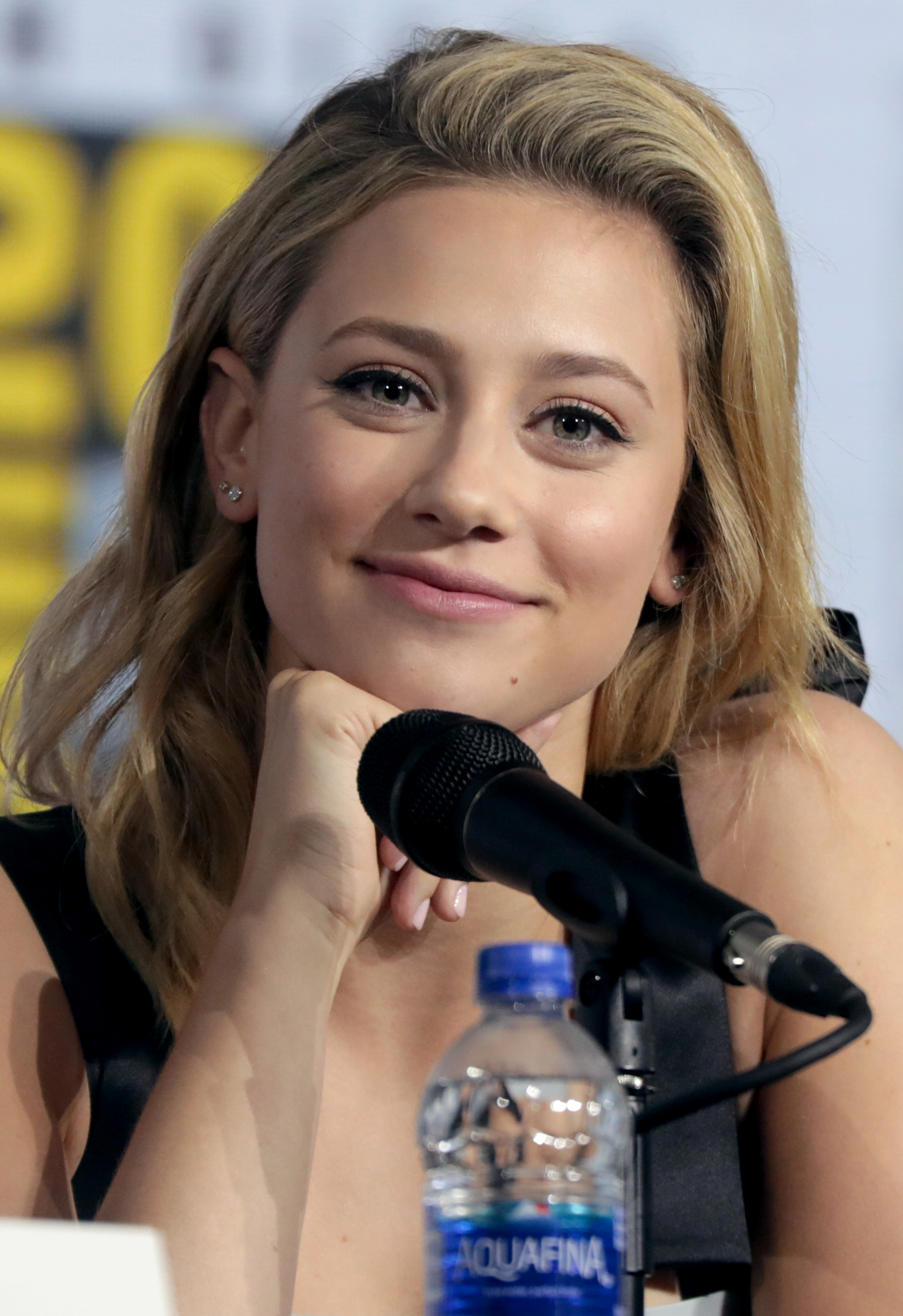
Future Riverdale star Lili Reinhart portrayed Courtney Lane, a seemingly concerned classmate of a Romani boy who goes missing in the episode "Lost Traveler".

On January 6, 2012, NBC president Robert Greenblatt announced at the Television Critics Association winter press tour that Harry Connick, Jr. had been cast in a four-episode arc as new Executive ADA, David Haden, a dedicated, straight-shooting prosecutor who is assigned a case with Detective Benson (Mariska Hargitay). Although Benson is at first wary of Haden, they are both surprised to find they work well together. As the case develops, so does their relationship. Connick's first episode was "Official Story", which aired January 18. "This is a home run on so many levels," said Mariska. "The show is very fortunate to have Harry's extraordinary talent, and I'm lucky because I get to work with my friend. I think Olivia couldn't have asked for a better companion to take her through a new stage in her life and career."

Country singer Miranda Lambert made her acting debut on the Law & Order: Special Victims Unit episode "Father's Shadow". Lambert played an actress who claims to have been sexually assaulted by a reality show producer played by Michael McKean. Harry Connick, Jr. (EADA David Haden) appeared in the episode as well. Ilene Kristen guest starred in "Father's Shadow" playing Evelyn Higgins, the estranged wife of Fred Sandow (Michael McKean). Kristen reported, "I had fun. I got to work with Ice-T, Mariska Hargitay, Kelli Giddish, and my old friend Dann Florek. We were on location; it was supposed to be the Lower East Side, but it was in Brooklyn in Williamsburg. It was a good experience, though it is hard shooting outside in the middle of winter. You get spoiled shooting a soap because you are inside most of the time." Cameron Monaghan guest starred as Sandow's disturbed teenage son and his producer.

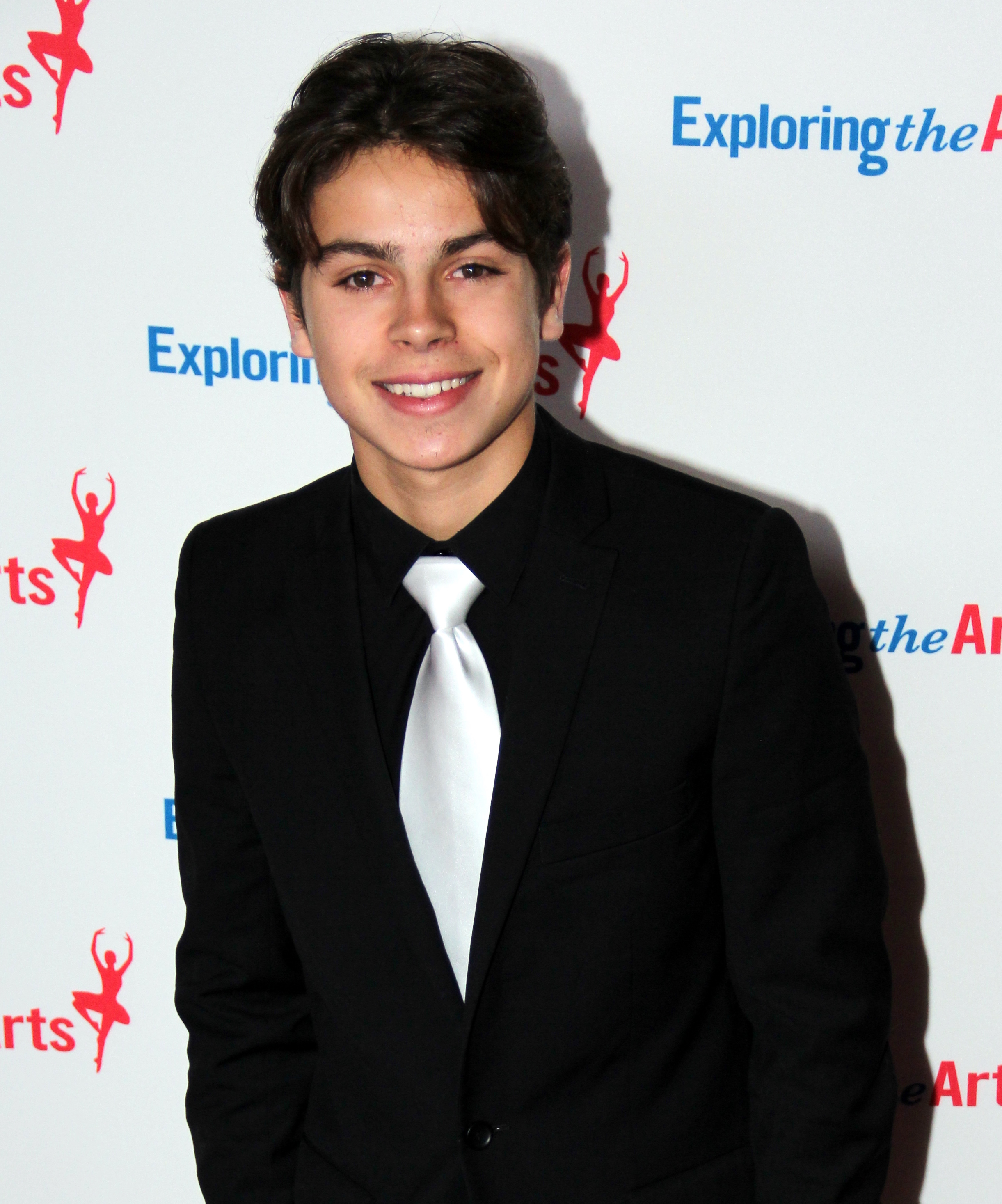
Jake T. Austin played Rob Fisher, boyfriend of a girl whose parents are murdered in the episode "Home Invasions".

Jake T. Austin guest starred in an episode titled "Home Invasions," Austin played Rob Fisher, the boyfriend of a girl whose family is massacred. "It's an honor to be a part of such a respected series," Austin said in a statement to The Huffington Post. "Being a New Yorker myself, I'm a huge fan of the show and can't wait to start filming." Tommy Flanagan also appeared in "Home Invasions" as a bookie and Isiah Whitlock also played a part in the episode. Michael Weston returned to the show to portray Olivia's brother, Simon Marsden. Simon was faced with losing his child in a battle with child social services. Andre Braugher also guest starred in the episode as Bayard Ellis.

Mark Consuelos guest starred as a potential suspect in the episode "Justice Denied". Danny Pino stated to TV Guide about the episode's case, "The case we're about to work on is one that deals with Fleet Week, and sailors that may or may not be responsible for a rape," Pino reveals. "Amaro starts to realize that maybe the original attacker wasn't really guilty. He starts to look at the new evidence and starts to question [the original investigation]." Chloë Sevigny guest starred in the episode "Valentine's Day", as a stay-at-home mom who is attacked and kidnapped while video-chatting with her husband, who is halfway around the world. She was slated to start shooting the episode the week of February 20, 2012. NBC declined to comment on the casting.

James Van Der Beek guest starred as a former friend of a doctor who is sabotaging him in the episode titled "Father Dearest", "I'm [going to] do some more serious drama this year", Van Der Beek recently told TVGuide.com. "I love that process. That's what I grew up doing, so sinking my teeth into a meaty role is definitely on the agenda."

Martha Stewart guest starred in the episode "Learning Curve" as a private school's headmistress. Tony Hale and Jane Adams also guest starred in the episode. Hale played Rick Simms, a teacher who is fired from his job after being accused of inappropriate behavior with a student (Dylan Minnette); Adams played Simms' former supervisor. Stewart said about her role as "the headmistress of a girls' school who is defending one of her teachers, a suspect in some hideous crime," she said. The gig hit close to home. "It was frightening work because the women detectives were very threatening. It brought back bad memories!" Constantine Maroulis guest starred in the episode "Strange Beauty".

In the season finale episode, titled "Rhodium Nights", Dean Winters returned to the show as Detective Brian Cassidy, who is running security for the owner of an escort service named Bart Ganzel, who is portrayed by Peter Jacobson. Brooke Smith played Ganzel’s rival in the sex-for-hire biz, Pippa Black portrayed a call girl, and Eric Ladin a well-known news anchor who is hosting the party where the body turns up. Show runner/executive producer Warren Leight noted that he booked the guest stars to be in the season 14 premiere episode, which turned out to be a two-part episode itself. "In fact, there were a number of scenes we shot that didn't make it into this cut that may make it into the next one. ... It's good to know who did it and why, and who's pulling the strings. I don't think we have every beat plotted out, and we may even do a two-parter to open the season. That's still in discussion. We have booked many of the actors so they're available when we begin shooting again in July. So just on that basis, we had to know who was complicit, because we had to know who was coming back." He also confirmed Dean Winters would return as well, "He's a terrific actor. ... Olivia has that line that Cassidy used to work in SVU "last century", and that's true. The show has legs. But I thought he had a lot of swag to him—I was very impressed. I thought the tension between Cassidy and Amaro was very believable".

== Episodes ==
Law & Order: Special Victims Unit season 13 episodes
No. overall	No. in season	Title	Directed by	Written by	Original release date	Prod. code	U.S. viewers (millions)
273	1	"Scorched Earth"	Michael Slovis	David Matthews	September 21, 2011	1301	7.63
The detectives of the Special Victims Unit are called to the scene when a hotel maid (Anika Noni Rose) reports being assaulted by an Italian diplomat (Franco Nero). Bureau Chief ADA Cutter and ADA Cabot prosecute the high-profile case, which quickly grows more complicated as the maid's credibility is publicly questioned. Detective Amanda Rollins (Kelli Giddish) joins the Manhattan SVU from Atlanta, while Detective Benson struggles to cope with the fall-out from the shooting in the precinct. Later, she is heartbroken to learn Detective Stabler has resigned from the NYPD.: Inspired by the New York v. Strauss-Kahn case.
274	2	"Personal Fouls"	Jim McKay	Bryan Goluboff	September 28, 2011	1302	7.24
As a long time coach (Dan Lauria) is inducted to the Metro Basketball Hall of Fame by former students, an ex-player (Aaron Tveit) accuses the coach of sexually abusing him as a child. Detective 2nd Grade Nick Amaro (Danny Pino) transfers into the SVU squad from narcotics and is thrown onto the case. The detectives interview former players but no one admits to abuse, forcing Detectives Benson and Tutuola to dig deeper into the coach's most successful player (Mehcad Brooks) and his manager (Heavy D).: This episode marks the first appearance of Detective Nick Amaro; Special appearances by Carmelo Anthony and Chris Bosh as themselves.; This episode marked Heavy D's final acting appearance before his death on November 8, 2011.
275	3	"Blood Brothers"	Tom DiCillo	Warren Leight & Julie Martin	October 5, 2011	1303	7.98
When a pregnant thirteen-year-old girl (Piper Curda) refuses to identify her baby's father (Jacob Kogan), Benson and the SVU squad work to determine if she was raped. Their investigation leads to a high-profile political couple (Kyle MacLachlan and Paige Turco) and the son (Anthony Keyvan) of their housekeeper (Judy Reyes). The detectives uncover much more than they bargained for when a family secret is revealed and a family member goes missing.: Inspired by the Arnold Schwarzenegger scandal.
276	4	"Double Strands"	Fred Berner	John P. Roche	October 12, 2011	1304	7.34
A dancer is followed home and raped by a man with a distinctive tattoo and the details of the attack reminds Rollins of a serial rapist she was tracking back home. The detectives arrest their prime suspect (T. R. Knight), a family man who maintains his innocence, but his description and DNA match this assault and the string of rapes across multiple states that Rollins had been investigating. Although the evidence supports the arrest and ADA Novak pushes to close the case, Benson and Amaro dig into the man's past and begin to believe his story.
277	5	"Missing Pieces"	Peter Leto	Julie Martin & Warren Leight	October 19, 2011	1305	7.66
Amaro is called to a case after spending time with his daughter Zara (Alison Fernandez) when a woman (Lisa Joyce) visiting from Buffalo claims that her car was stolen with her baby still buckled in the backseat. Benson and Amaro get as much information as they can from the anxious mother and her boyfriend (Dennis Flanagan) at the station, while Tutuola and Rollins track their path from Buffalo for clues. When the parents' stories don't add up, the detectives must uncover what really happened to the missing baby, and the truth surprises everyone.: Detectives investigating the disappearance of Sky Metalwala in the Seattle area two weeks after this episode aired, in which a woman battling over child custody issues with her husband claimed her two-year-old son went missing from a parked car while she left him there to look for gas even though the investigation later found the car had plenty of fuel in the tank, were struck by the similarities. The episode had, in fact, been rerun the night before the alleged disappearance.
278	6	"True Believers"	Courtney Hunt	Robin Veith	November 2, 2011	1306	7.10
A young music student (Sofia Vassilieva) is raped at gunpoint in her own apartment by a young drug dealer (Cedric Sanders). With her help, the SVU squad makes a quick arrest. Cutter takes over the prosecution when he finds that opposing counsel is high-profile defense attorney Bayard Ellis (Andre Braugher). As Ellis works to undermine their police work and damage the victim's credibility, Cutter makes the detectives take the stand to prove they have more than just a he-said, she-said case.: When Sergeant Munch introduces himself in the squad room, Andre Braugher's character comments: "Have we met?" This is a reference to the fact that Braugher played opposite Richard Belzer's character Munch for six seasons on Homicide: Life on the Street.; Sarah Walsh reappears in the season 15 episode "Wonderland Story".
279	7	"Russian Brides"	Alex Chapple	Bryan Goluboff	November 9, 2011	1307	6.70
When a young woman is found brutally murdered, the SVU detectives use her distinctive tattoos to identify her as a recently engaged Russian mail-order bride. Upon questioning her distraught fiancé (Timothy Busfield), they learn that she was kidnapped and held for ransom the night of their engagement party. While the detectives follow the money to a deadly blackmail scam run by the Russian Mafia, Captain Cragen tracks down another bride (Izabella Miko) and goes undercover as a sad and lonely suitor to lure out a killer.
280	8	"Educated Guess"	Arthur W. Forney	Judith McCreary	November 16, 2011	1308	7.33
A man in custody (David Gelles) at a mental hospital claims to have witnessed a rape in a break room. Despite the witness' shaky credibility the SVU begins an investigation, but the alleged victim (Natasha Lyonne) denies being assaulted. Benson and Rollins struggle to piece together what really happened to this young woman, especially when her aunt (Carrie Preston) and mother (J. Smith-Cameron) say she has been repeatedly institutionalized, and has cried rape in the past. The detectives eventually learn that the family is hiding a dark secret.
281	9	"Lost Traveler"	Jean de Segonzac	Julie Martin & David Matthews	November 30, 2011	1309	9.90
A Romani child (Cameron Ocasio) disappears on his way home from school. Benson and Amaro interview the distraught parents, who are distrustful of the police. The initial investigation leads Tutuola and Rollins to the powerful leader of the Romani community (Mark Margolis), but he denies any involvement. The family remains hopeful their boy will be found, especially when they discover his cell phone is still active. When Cutter and Cabot threaten to jail a meddling newspaper reporter (Gavin Lee) with a powerful defense attorney (Ron Rifkin), the detectives narrow the suspect pool to a mentally challenged neighbor.: Some elements inspired by Murder of Milly Dowler case.
282	10	"Spiraling Down"	Alex Chapple	John P. Roche & Warren Leight	December 7, 2011	1310	7.03
A military colleague (Dominic Fumusa) of Amaro's wife (Laura Benanti) reports his fourteen-year-old daughter (Kay Panabaker) missing. The detectives find the girl working as a prostitute under a possessive pimp. They quickly set up a sting operation to entrap Johns on rape charges with a minor, and arrest an aging pro quarterback (Treat Williams). Cabot seeks to make an example out of the football legend, but Benson calls defense attorney Bayard Ellis to his aid after the man's wife (Beth Chamberlin) tells her about the brain damage resulting from his injuries on the field.: Inspired by cases of CTE and the death of David Duerson.; Special appearances by Warren Sapp and Jerry Rice as themselves.
283	11	"Theatre Tricks"	Constantine Makris	Story by : Marygrace O'Shea, Julie Martin, & Warren Leight; Teleplay by : Marygrace O'Shea	January 11, 2012	1311	8.40
An actress (Jenn Proske) in an interactive theater production is raped on stage, while the audience believes it to be part of the show. The SVU detectives hit an early obstacle in their investigation when they learn the show's passionate director (Fisher Stevens) gave the audience, including the assailant, masks to wear during the performance. They chase up ticket purchases, and discover a woman who bought dozens of tickets with a card. They visit her, but she denies she has a card. Making an unwarranted search of her son's room they discover he is an obsessed fan (Adam Driver) of the young actress. He denies raping her, and as evidence shows his recording of the performance, including the assault. From the recording they identify a theatre critic who was holding the actress down during the rape. While he was believed he was just taking part in the performance he observed cufflinks with the word "sustained" on the attacker. This leads Benson and Amaro to a respected divorce court judge (Kevin Pollak). The judge explains that the encounter was consensual, arranged via a website, and there was a safe word "Dixie" which the actress could have used at any time - and provides the detectives with the communications between himself and the victim. Researching the key suspects they discover the director's first play was called Dixie, and the judge ruled in his divorce case, also stylistic similarities between his writing and the communications with the judge, that were apparently from the actress, and that the actress had spurned his advances. They arrest the director, but have insufficient evidence. Digging further into the judge's story, he mentions another woman he had an encounter via the website, the photo he shows them is the actresses roommate, also an aspiring (and frustrated) actress. The roommate had arranged the rape, and framed the director, out of envy and anger as the actress had got the role she was trying for, and had had sex with the director to obtain it.
284	12	"Official Story"	Michael Smith	Peter Blauner	January 18, 2012	1312	6.42
The CEO (John Doman) of a private military contractor is confronted by Occupy Wall Street protesters and later found drugged and sexually assaulted in a park. Benson and Amaro begin their investigation, but find the victim unwilling to cooperate. A much larger crime and conspiracy in Iraq is unveiled when the SVU squad and the new Executive ADA, David Haden (Harry Connick Jr.), learn that the attack was retribution by a father (Holt McCallany) for the rape of his daughter (Megan Ketch). Meanwhile, Benson begins to develop feelings for Haden as they work the case.
285	13	"Father's Shadow"	Jean de Segonzac	Warren Leight & Julie Martin	February 8, 2012	1313	6.55
An aspiring actress (Charlotte Graham) is found unconscious in Central Park with drugs in her system and evidence of sexual trauma. Benson and Amaro pay a visit to the reality show producer (Michael McKean) for whom she had auditioned just before the attack, and stop him from assaulting another actress (Miranda Lambert) on the casting couch. The detectives arrest the producer and Cutter quickly presses charges, but the situation turns dangerous when his distraught son (Cameron Monaghan) takes drastic action in order to get his father out of jail.
286	14	"Home Invasions"	Jim McKay	Bryan Goluboff	February 15, 2012	1314	5.90
A gunman storms a family's home, killing the parents (Alex Manette and Dawn Evans) and leaving their teenage daughter (Lauren Kelly) in critical condition. When a hate crime investigation turns into a dead end, the SVU detectives struggle to find a motive for such violence. Of the family's acquaintances, the only one having a criminal record is the brother (Esai Morales) of their housekeeper (Elizabeth Rodriguez). The clues lead to a surprising revelation about Rollins, which threatens her future in the Special Victims Unit.
287	15	"Hunting Ground"	Jonathan Kaplan	Story by : John P. Roche & Warren Leight; Teleplay by : David Matthews & John P. Roche	February 22, 2012	1315	5.99
Benson and Haden's romantic weekend is interrupted by news that an underage prostitute (Emily Kinney) has gone missing. As the SVU detectives dig into her disappearance, they find a pattern of several missing escorts who all posted ads on a popular newspaper's website. From one of the few victims who escaped (Reyna de Courcy), the squad learns that the killer (Fred Arsenault) hunts his victims in a bird sanctuary. The line between Benson and Haden's personal and professional lives starts to blur as the squad races against the clock to find the girl before it's too late.: Inspired by the crimes believed to be committed by the Long Island serial killer and serial killer Robert Hansen.
288	16	"Child's Welfare"	Holly Dale	Story by : Warren Leight; Teleplay by : Peter Blauner & Julie Martin	February 29, 2012	1316	5.42
Benson's half-brother Simon Marsden (Michael Weston) turns up in New York after a five-year absence and says that Child Services is threatening to take his children away from him. Benson asks defense attorney Bayard Ellis to represent her brother, but the seemingly simple case turns into a disaster for Ellis and his client. As Olivia tries to balance her personal life, the unit lands a case where a homeless couple finds a newborn baby abandoned near a hospital. Munch, Tutuola, Amaro and Rollins follow the evidence to a shocking discovery: a couple (Danielle Straastkad and Graham Anderson) abducting women and imprisoning them so they can give birth to girls, while abandoning boy babies.
289	17	"Justice Denied"	Michael Slovis	Story by : Stuart Feldman & Warren Leight; Teleplay by : Stuart Feldman	April 11, 2012	1318	5.57
A rape victim (Cynthia LaForte) is brought to the hospital after a harrowing hours-long ordeal, and Benson recognizes the suspect's M.O. from a case she solved eight years ago. The jailed suspect (Guillermo Diaz) confessed to Benson after a tough interrogation in 2004, but has been claiming his innocence ever since his conviction. The SVU is forced to reopen Benson's old case to determine if they are dealing with a copycat or a case of wrongful imprisonment. Re-interviewing a past victim (Samantha Soule) reveals that she may have been raped by someone else, causing Benson's detective work to be challenged and scrutinized. Olivia's personal relationship with Haden is also placed in jeopardy when Bayard Ellis gets involved with the case.
290	18	"Valentine's Day"	Peter Leto	Julie Martin & Warren Leight	April 18, 2012	1317	5.95
A rape investigation is set into motion after a husband (Rich Sommer) sees his wife Christine (Chloë Sevigny) being attacked while video chatting. The kidnappers demand ransom, and Benson, Amaro, Rollins and Tutuola are staked out when the missing housewife arrives to pick up the money. She frantically tells the detectives about her ordeal, but Benson grows suspicious of her story and it soon becomes clear that she is a con artist. When the case gets to trial, Novak finds herself prosecuting an unlikely suspect. Meanwhile, Amaro begins to think that his wife is lying to him about her personal life.
291	19	"Street Revenge"	Arthur W. Forney	Story by : Julie Martin & David Matthews; Teleplay by : David Matthews	April 25, 2012	1320	6.56
A string of rapes in West Soho inspires a group of vigilantes to organize against both neighborhood crime and the NYPD. While a reporter (Gavin Lee) takes every opportunity to publicly criticize police efforts, the squad struggles to find a lead in the case until one of the vigilantes (Hani Furstenberg) is attacked and another (Keir O'Donnell) claims to be in love with her. As Cragen and Benson fight for control over the investigation, Amaro becomes sidetracked with his wife's involvement with a man from her unit in Iraq.
292	20	"Father Dearest"	Rosemary Rodriguez	Story by : John P. Roche & Warren Leight; Teleplay by : John P. Roche	May 2, 2012	1321	6.62
Benson and Amaro investigate the disappearance of a teenaged girl named Cate Avery (Shannon Maree Walsh) after her young brother (Jake Katzman) calls 9-1-1. While Tutuola and Rollins look into a possible abduction, they discover the girl had been searching for her biological father, an anonymous sperm donor (Eric Close). The investigation takes a startling turn when a suspect (James Van Der Beek) is found to be targeting several young, vulnerable women, all with the same personal connection. The returning Dr. Huang (BD Wong) must delve into the suspect's past to save the other women in similar situations.
293	21	"Learning Curve"	Jonathan Herron	Story by : Warren Leight & Julie Martin; Teleplay by : Robin Veith	May 9, 2012	1319	5.90
As Tutuola's son Ken (Ernest Waddell) seeks out Munch's help to tell his father that he is getting married, his fiancé (Miguel Govea) is brutally assaulted by a local street gang. He becomes the latest in a string of recent hate crimes against gay men, and before SVU can make an arrest, a school teacher (Tony Hale) is similarly brutalized even though he does not fit the pattern. As the detectives search for a connection, they learn that he was dismissed from an elite private school for having an inappropriate relationship with a student (Dylan Minnette). In trying to help Cabot make her case, they quickly realize that the facts do not add up and that another teacher (Jane Adams) may hold the clues to what really happened.
294	22	"Strange Beauty"	Alex Chapple	Peter Blauner & Robin Veith	May 16, 2012	1322	5.56
While off-duty, Rollins spots a young woman (Morgan Lynch) screaming in the back of a moving taxi. The unit quickly identifies the victim as a rebellious teenager, estranged from her family and experimenting in the world of tattoos and self-mutilation. The case takes an unexpected turn when Dr. Warner presents the detectives with a cleanly severed leg, reminiscent of a similar finding in an old unsolved case. The detectives are drawn into the psychological elements of self-mutilation and ritual amputation as they investigate two brothers (David Eigenberg and Patrick Fischler) and a one-legged acquaintance of theirs (Britt Lower) in order to link the cases and find the missing woman.
295	23	"Rhodium Nights"	Norberto Barba	Warren Leight & Julie Martin	May 23, 2012	1323	7.16
An underage escort is found dead at a wild bachelor party, and Cragen cautions his team to investigate with discretion, as there were several high-profile people at the scene. In their efforts to question a well-known leader in the New York escort world, Bart Ganzel (Peter Jacobson), Benson and Amaro encounter former SVU detective Brian Cassidy (Dean Winters), who has been working undercover. With his help, the detectives dig deeper into a vicious power struggle between Ganzel's escort business and that of Delia Wilson (Brooke Smith). Meanwhile, Amaro's already shaky marriage is brought into focus as a hooker (Pippa Black) begins to make advances on him. Before the case filled with systemic corruption is cracked, a shocking event threatens to destroy the life of one SVU squad member.: Inspired by a rape allegedly committed by NY Fox 5 News reporter, Greg Kelly, who is the son of former NYPD Police Commissioner, Raymond Kelly.
