= Disappearance of Sky Metalwala =

Unsolved 2011 disappearance

Coordinates: 47.63241°N 122.19099°W

Sky Elijah Metalwala
- Metalwala at the time of his disappearance, left, and age progressed to what he might look like at age 5 in 2014
- Born: Sky Elijah Metalwala; September 6, 2009; Bellevue, Washington, U.S.
- Disappeared: November 6, 2011 (aged 2); Bellevue, Washington, U.S.
- Status: Missing for 15 years and 15 days
- Height: 2 ft 10 in (86 cm)
- Parents: Solomon Metalwala (father); Julia Biryukova (mother)

On the morning of November 6, 2011, Sky Elijah Metalwala (born September 6, 2009) disappeared in Bellevue, Washington, United States. His mother, Julia Biryukova, claimed that she put Sky, who was reportedly sick, and his older sister in her car to go to a nearby hospital. Along the way, Biryukova stated that she ran out of gas and left Sky in the car along a Bellevue street while she went to get help. She said that when she returned after being gone about an hour and a half, Sky was gone. He has not been seen since.

The situation was reported to police, who soon came to doubt Biryukova's account since her car was found to have enough gas in its tank and was in working order. Her description of the incident also shared similarities with an episode of Law & Order: Special Victims Unit that had been rebroadcast in the Seattle area the night before. Shortly before, Biryukova had decided to withdraw from a mediated custody agreement that was the last stage of an acrimonious divorce from Sky's father, Solomon Metalwala. Solomon has remained active in assisting police with the investigation, believing Sky's disappearance was related to the custody dispute.

Biryukova has not been fully cooperative with the police, although she claims to have no more idea than her ex-husband of what happened to Sky. Although there have been allegations that she neglected Sky when he was in her custody, and state child-welfare agencies have tried to remove a child she had with a later husband with a history of abuse, police have made a "strategic decision" not to charge her with child endangerment for leaving her son in the car on the day he disappeared, in order to keep their options open if they learn more about Sky's whereabouts.

== Background ==
Both of Sky Metalwala's parents were immigrants to the United States. Solomon Metalwala is originally from Pakistan. Julia Biryukova is a Ukrainian born in Soviet Russia; she later claimed to have been subjected to shock therapy in mental hospitals during her childhood as punishment, in addition to regular disciplinary beatings by her parents, with serious negative effects on her self-esteem as a result. Solomon had been running a convenience store in Bellevue, Washington, when the two met in 1997.

Biryukova met her future husband at age 15, three years after emigrating from Russia. At that time she was a student at Bellevue High School. Solomon, then 21, invited her to a party, and the two began dating. Biryukova took up a job at a restaurant his family owned in the Pioneer Square neighborhood of Seattle. By 1999, when she finished high school and was naturalized, the couple bought a condominium in Bellevue.

While Biryukova and Metalwala enjoyed work and many leisure activities together, there was some friction between them. Police in Kirkland were called when the couple were seen arguing loudly at a local gas station over their plans for the evening. The man gave his name as Sulaiman Metalwala, supposedly Solomon's brother.

Biryukova later told a clinical psychologist that by this point she had learned that her boyfriend could be "very controlling" and she had become emotionally dependent on him in turn. Nevertheless, in 2003, she married him in a brief ceremony in his mother's kitchen. Later she said his family gave her the choice of either doing so or never seeing him again, since they claimed he was facing imminent deportation, for reasons that are not known. Biryukova later claimed that she did not tell her own family the real reason the two had wed until 2010.

In 2005, Solomon converted to Christianity; he and his wife began attending a church in Kirkland. Biryukova believed that her in-laws blamed her for this, straining their relationship with her and causing more problems in the marriage. Within two years they were experiencing financial problems as well, when a competing deli opened next to their restaurant and began cutting into their earnings. Daughter Maile, their first child, was born in 2007.

Business further declined in the Great Recession that began in 2008. Despite those setbacks, the two bought a home in Kirkland that year for over $800,000, in addition to the mortgage payments they still had to make on their Bellevue condominium.

Sky was born in 2009; a psychiatrist Biryukova saw prescribed her antidepressants while she was pregnant although she said she did not need them. By then lenders were beginning to foreclose the family's properties and they were in arrears on many of their bills. They were forced to move out of the Kirkland home and into the smaller Bellevue residence. Solomon claimed in later court papers that at this time, Biryukova began exhibiting psychological problems, causing him to begin eating outside and sleeping on the floor to comply with her obsession with keeping the condominium clean. The board cited the couple several times for violating noise regulations; at one point they awoke their neighbors with vacuuming after 11 p.m. Biryukova, in turn, alleged that Solomon became controlling and angry.

When Sky was two months old, his parents left him alone in their car in a Target parking lot for almost an hour on a day when the outdoor temperature was 27 °F (−3 °C). Both parents were arrested after police had them paged to their car and charged with reckless endangerment. The Metalwalas claimed they had been inside only for twenty minutes and did not want to wake the child, but the store's security camera video footage disproved them. After they agreed to take a parenting class, charges were dropped several years later.

=== Divorce ===
On Biryukova's 29th birthday, in early 2010, she was briefly committed to a mental hospital for the first of three times, after telling Solomon she had dreamed of killing the children. There, she was diagnosed with severe obsessive compulsive disorder (OCD); however, psychiatrists did not believe that rendered her unfit to parent a child and she would later deny that she had been so diagnosed. Shortly after she got out, Solomon filed for divorce.

After the couple separated, Biryukova texted her husband claiming to have suicidal ideations, which she later claimed she had done just to get his attention. Upon her third commitment, she was found to have a Global Assessment of Functioning score of 15, suggesting she was a danger to herself and others; it had improved to 40, meaning slight impairment, by the time she was released. After that release, Solomon and his brother took Biryukova to University of Washington Medical Center where she checked in voluntarily. While she was there, their lender foreclosed on the condominium. Solomon moved with the children to his parents' home in Kirkland.

The couple vigorously contested the divorce. Biryukova alleged in her filings that Solomon had been abusive and that she feared for her life. Solomon claimed that the allegations were fabricated, and said Biryukova's mental problems made her unstable, incapable of keeping food in the house, or letting her children sleep in beds due to her OCD. Child Protective Services investigated a claim that Solomon had injured his daughter but ruled it unfounded; nevertheless Solomon was prohibited from seeing his children for a year while the case was investigated. At different times in the case, both spouses sought protection orders against each other.

In September 2010, the court awarded Biryukova full custody of both children. She refused to let them see Solomon, who did not have any visitation rights. Solomon continued to press the issue in court, along with some other issues such as property they both owned. Biryukova offered to forego alimony and child support if he let her move to Arizona with the children, but he refused.

These disputes continued for over a year. In November 2011, the court hearing the case ordered the couple into a week of mediation to resolve their issues. The session was reportedly a success, with the two eventually agreeing that Biryukova would have custody of both children while Solomon had full visitation. However, on November 3, shortly after the agreement had been signed, Biryukova called her lawyer and, saying she had felt pressured into the session, decided to void it.

== Disappearance ==
According to Biryukova, on the morning of November 6, 2011, Sky woke up sick in their Redmond apartment. She has said she put him and his sister in the car she was driving at the time, a silver 1998 two-door Acura Integra, and headed for the Overlake Medical Center in Bellevue. Biryukova later stated that around the 2600 block of 112th Avenue N.E. in that city, a long section of the road that follows a tall concrete noise barrier around the curve of the Washington State Route 520 expressway, just west of its interchange with Interstate 405, her car ran out of gas.

Biryukova parked the car on the side of the road. She said she left Sky strapped into his car seat inside while she took Maile to find assistance, reaching a Chevron station a mile (1.6 km) north of where she parked an hour later. Instead of buying gas or asking someone to bring it to her car, she called a friend, who came and picked her up and gave her a ride back to her car.

Biryukova said that when she returned, she discovered that Sky was gone. She called police and reported him missing. They, in turn, contacted Solomon before noon that day.

== Investigation ==
Searchers combed a 20-block radius of the car but found nothing. Bellevue police soon came to doubt Biryukova's account. Her car, when tested, proved to have adequate fuel in its tank and operated normally. In the hour she spent wandering the neighborhood before reaching the gas station, she apparently made little effort to seek help from residents. Biryukova had left her home with a purportedly sick child but not taken her wallet, purse and phone. No gas can was found in the car.

When questioned further about these discrepancies, Biryukova invoked her Fifth Amendment rights and refused to take a lie detector test. She did, however, give investigators permission to search her car, her computer and her home. There was no sign of Sky at or near the latter location. Her car was unlocked and did not show any signs of forced entry. Police searched Solomon's house as well and found nothing. After a lie detector test he took the night after the disappearance proved inconclusive, Solomon took another one the next day, although neither he, his attorney, nor the police shared the results with the public.

Police soon learned about the 2009 incident where Biryukova and Solomon had been arrested after leaving Sky in their car unattended. During the investigation, both parents admitted to having left the children by themselves for long periods of time. Detectives would not confirm whether, according to some reports, Biryukova had done so during the lengthy mediation hearing the week before Sky went missing.

There were some questions about whether Sky had even been in the car that morning to begin with. Motorists who had passed the parked Acura did not report seeing anything unusual, not even a child in it. At Biryukova's apartment complex in Redmond, neighbors said she and her children rarely went out, and none of them had seen Sky for at least two weeks. Solomon was not aware of anyone having seen his son other than his ex-wife since an April doctor visit. However, Maile told the police that Sky had indeed been in the car that morning.

The theory that Sky's disappearance might have been arranged by Biryukova drew more credence when police learned of strong coincidences between her story and a recently aired episode of the popular NBC crime drama Law & Order: Special Victims Unit. In the episode, titled "Missing Pieces", a young couple claims their baby son has been abducted when their parked car was stolen. It is later learned that they buried the boy believing they accidentally killed him and made up the abduction as a cover story. The episode, first broadcast two weeks earlier, had been rerun in the Seattle area the night before Sky vanished.

"I know that there are several folks up in the operations center of the command post that have taken a look at that episode," Major Mike Johnson of the Bellevue police told reporters, "and have commented that it is strikingly similar in nature." Through his attorney, Solomon told People that Law & Order was his wife's favorite show.

Biryukova's presence on the Internet also aroused interest. On her Facebook page, she had posted many pictures of Maile but almost none of Sky. During the previous months, she had also posted a profile to seekingarrangements.com, a dating website for women seeking "sugar daddies", wealthy men willing to support a younger woman financially as part of a romantic relationship. She sought "financial stability", as well as $3,000–5,000 in cash per month.

Investigators stated publicly that they did not believe Biryukova's story and suspected criminal activity had occurred. However, they did not formally describe her as a prime suspect or person of interest, nor did they charge her with child endangerment despite the circumstances of the case and her past arrest, along with her then-husband, for leaving Sky in the car unsupervised.

The decision not to do so, they said later, was a "strategic decision"; in order to secure a conviction, police and prosecutors would have to prove that they believe Biryukova did in fact leave her son alone in the vehicle for an unreasonable length of time. But if evidence later emerged suggesting Sky had been murdered or kidnapped that implicated his mother in some capacity, evidence that suggested he had never been in the car to begin with, arresting her on charges that she had indeed left him there could make a prosecution for the more serious charges impossible, a police spokesman said. Later, Solomon's lawyer told the Seattle Weekly another reason for the inaction: if police did arrest Biryukova, she and her attorney would be able to review all the evidence the police had accumulated up to that point, which neither they nor Solomon wanted her to be able to do.

== Subsequent developments ==
Two weeks after Sky disappeared, Biryukova finally discussed the case with the media. ABC News obtained an email address that her relatives said was hers and used it to contact her. She reiterated that she had no idea where the child was and called her ex-husband a "sadistic Muslim Pakistani" who was not telling the truth himself. About the case itself, she said her lawyer had instructed her not to discuss it with anyone; she ignored a specific question about whether she had indeed run out of gas that morning.

ABC News was unable to confirm whether it was indeed Biryukova who had responded to them, as she was known to be staying with relatives at the time. However, Solomon told them it sounded to him like the way she would have talked. "Obviously she's just trying to maybe get me kind of riled up," he said. After reviewing the emails, ABC News shared them with the Bellevue police, who could not comment on them but believed they might be of some value to their case.

The Washington State Department of Social and Health Services (DSHS) removed Maile from Biryukova's home in the wake of her brother's disappearance and placed her into foster care. Solomon was granted twice-weekly visitation while petitioning the court hearing the divorce to grant him custody, which it did after removing the remaining protection order. The divorce was granted in January 2012.

In 2015, on the case's fourth anniversary, Bellevue's new police chief, Steve Mylett, appealed publicly to Biryukova to talk to them again. "I am convinced you hold the key to finding Sky," he said in a local newspaper. While the previous year the department said it had exhausted all the leads that had been reported to it, at that time Mylett claimed Solomon had shared some unspecified new information with them that might prove useful. Images of Sky that had been digitally age progressed to show how he might appear at that time were distributed along with the original photos.

=== Biryukova's remarriage and third child ===
Around the time of the fourth anniversary of Sky's disappearance in 2015, it was reported that Biryukova had not only remarried the previous year but had borne her third child by her new husband, Alan Morgan, in July. DSHS workers were trying to have the infant removed from her care.

DSHS was most concerned about Biryukova's mental health, given her OCD diagnosis and past hospitalizations, following a complaint from the person who delivered the child. They also found Morgan, a convicted felon, problematic. Authorities in Florida had taken a child from Morgan's home there. The month the two were married, Biryukova reported Morgan to the Redmond police for allegedly assaulting her and was granted a no-contact order; she nevertheless visited him regularly in jail in Issaquah, where he was when she gave birth, under assumed names. Both claimed to investigators they did not live together despite giving them the same address; Biryukova said at one point she did not even know who the father was, even though Morgan's name was on the child's birth certificate.

In February 2019, Biryukova testified in court that Morgan had violated the no-contact order. She acknowledged that she was not allowed to be alone with her new son without an observer present. Bellevue police spokesperson Seth Tyler said, "We do believe she knows where Sky is." She refused to talk to the press after the court appearance.

Two years later Biryukova was arrested by Redmond police on a shoplifting charge. She continued to refuse to speak with Bellevue police about her son's disappearance. On the 10th anniversary, the Bellevue police released an updated flyer with Sky now shown age-progressed to 12. They again asked Biryukova to come in and talk to them, saying that they had spent $2.5 million investigating the case over the past decade and followed up on 2,500 tips.

== Theories ==
No trace of Sky was found in the neighborhoods surrounding the area where Biryukova parked her car. Police said they believed he did not wander away on his own. In the absence of any new information or useful leads, and with Biryukova's account still considered doubtful, theories of Sky's disappearance have assumed his mother's connivance. If he is alive, it is believed that either she let someone else take him that day, or earlier, with Sky's presence in the car an invention. "She concocted that hospital story and when she realized no-one believed it, she hired an attorney," Leslie Clay Berry, Solomon's attorney, told the Seattle Weekly in 2013.

Solomon said he believed that his son was alive, but perhaps not in the U.S. In spring of 2011, after the visit to the doctor that was the last independent record of Sky's presence outside of Biryukova's household, he recalled that her estranged father came from Ukraine to visit her. Solomon wondered to the Weekly if the older man could have taken the boy back to that country with him at the time. However, in 2013, he said that he did not know how that could have happened. Berry, Solomon's attorney, said she believes more definitely that Sky was never in the car that morning, nor would police have been expected to find any evidence in the apartment. "She's a clean freak, and she probably bleached everything out," she said to the newspaper, pointing to Biryukova's OCD.

Unlike her client, Berry is doubtful about the outcome of the case. "I don't think he's alive," she said in 2013. "Solomon doesn't like when I say that, but that's what I think." While she believes Biryukova is responsible for Sky's death, she allows that it could have been merely the result of child neglect rather than a deliberate act of malice.

== See also ==
- List of people who disappeared mysteriously (2000–present)
