= Justice Denied (Law & Order: Special Victims Unit) =

- Law & Order: Special Victims Unit episode
- Episode no.: Season 13; Episode 17
- Directed by: Michael Slovis
- Story by: Stuart Feldman; Warren Leight
- Teleplay by: Stuart Feldman
- Production code: 13018
- Original air date: April 11, 2012

Guest appearances
- Guillermo Díaz as Omar Pena; Cynthia LaForte as Gina Logan; Mark Consuelos as Michael Martinez; Ramon Fernandez as Javier; Samantha Soule as Ariel Baskins; Tabitha Holbert as ADA Rose Callay; Ami Brabson as Judge Karyn Blake; Andre Braugher as Defense Attorney Bayard Ellis; Harry Connick Jr. as Executive ADA David Haden

Episode chronology
← Previous "Child's Welfare"	Next → "Valentine's Day"
- Law & Order: Special Victims Unit season 13

"Justice Denied" is the seventeenth episode of the thirteenth season of the NBC legal drama, Law & Order: Special Victims Unit and the 289th episode overall. It originally aired on NBC in the United States on April 11, 2012. The episode follows Detective Olivia Benson, who discovers that she may have put an innocent man in prison eight years ago for a crime that he did not commit, placing her job and her relationship with Executive ADA David Haden (Harry Connick Jr.) on the line.

The episode was written by Stuart Feldman (teleplay and story) and show runner/executive producer Warren Leight (story), and directed by freshman Law & Order: SVU director Michael Slovis. This episode is notable for ending the season thirteen story arcs for characters Executive Assistant District Attorney David Haden and Defense Attorney Bayard Ellis, who were portrayed by Harry Connick Jr. and Andre Braugher respectively; this episode also ending Detective Benson's relationship with EADA Haden who is promoted at the end of the episode.

"Justice Denied" earned generally positive reviews, critics praising the break-up scene between Benson and Haden and Benson accepting Amaro as "a good partner"; the break-up scene made number 21 out of 25 on TV Guide's 2012 Best TV Episodes. According to the Nielsen ratings, the episode's original broadcast was watched by an average of 5.57 million total viewers and received a 1.7/4% share in the 18–49 age demographic, up slightly from the previous episode, "Child's Welfare".

== Plot ==
In 2004, after a nine-hour interrogation, Omar Pena, a seaman in the US Navy, confesses to Detective Olivia Benson to the brutal rape of Ariel Baskins, who was tied up, gagged with a scarf, cut up, and partially blinded by the rapist's pouring ammonia in her eyes. Omar has recanted and claimed his innocence since, saying his confession was made under extreme duress.

In 2012, Omar fails to convince Judge Karyn Blake to allow DNA from the case to be gathered and tested via current methods not available eight years ago, then 23-year-old Gina Logan is brought to the hospital after being similarly raped; thus, Benson recognizes the M.O. from Ariel's rape.

Special Victims Unit is forced to reopen the 2004 case, and Benson believes Gina's rapist is a copycat trying to throw doubt onto Omar's conviction. SVU learns Omar helped Mike Martinez, another former sailor in jail for attempted rape, to get his conviction overturned. When Benson interrogates Martinez and brings him to come perilously close to confessing to Gina's rape, Amaro sees that her intense techniques can result in a false confession. DNA results later prove Martinez is not Gina's rapist.

As Benson’s work is challenged, her relationship with Executive ADA David Haden is placed in jeopardy, and she learns that Omar's new attorney is Bayard Ellis, who won several cases against SVU in the past. After interviewing Ariel, Benson learns the scarf she was gagged with was red, but in the evidence log, a cop, suffering from MS and showing symptoms of color blindness, listed it as green. One of the interrogating detectives told Omar the scarf was green and Omar, under extreme duress and unaware of the scarf's actual color, confessed to get the hellish interrogation to end.

Benson remembers she never visited the scene of Ariel's rape as Benson was with Ariel in the hospital, and Munch and Tutuola had never seen the scarf either, making Benson realize that she did force a false confession out of Omar. DNA from Gina's rape matches that from Ariel's rape, proving Omar's innocence.

The SVU's investigation leads them to Javier Maranhao, a Brazilian Navy sailor who, according to DNA hits from Interpol, has committed other rapes — in Buenos Aires, Argentina in 2006, Naples, Italy in 2008, and Rota, Spain in 2009, all with the same M.O. Ariel and Gina both identify Javier as the rapist whose DNA matches samples found in both crime scenes. He is arrested, and Omar is freed with his conviction overturned.

Later, Captain Cragen informs Benson that the District Attorney will form a Conviction Integrity Unit to investigate past cases and ensure no one is wrongfully imprisoned. Cragen says the Conviction Integrity Unit will start with the SVU and Haden is the attorney in charge. Benson and Haden meet for drinks and decide to end their relationship in order to protect the integrity of the SVU and avoid a conflict of interest.

== Production ==
"Justice Denied" was written by Stuart Feldman (teleplay and story) and showrunner/executive producer, Warren Leight (story), and directed by Michael Slovis. This episode was the final episode of the thirteenth season for both recurring guest stars Andre Braugher and Harry Connick, Jr., who portrayed defense attorney Bayard Ellis and Executive Assistant District Attorney David Haden in four episodes, respectively. In an interview close to the episodes original airing, Connick, Jr. enjoyed his time on SVU, stating; "The greatest thing for me is that I became friends with Mariska [Hargitay], she's an incredible woman, has an amazing family, and I really feel that although my time on SVU has come to an end, that I made a really good life-long friend, and if I have the good fortune of coming back I'd be very happy about that and if not, I feel really proud of the work I've done thus far [on SVU]."

In an interview with TV Guide in February 2012, showrunner/executive producer Warren Leight initially spoke of what was to come in this episode. Leight suggested that it is possible Connick, Jr. will return to the show after his initial four-episode arc. "Originally [Connick] was booked for four episodes, but I'm under no obligation to kill him off at the end of those four. He seems to be having a good time. They seem to be working pretty well together, but at some point drama must rear its head. One thing I will say is we will not reveal him to be a serial killer. And I have no intention of tragically blowing him up in a car or anything like that." Between seasons 8 and 12 (under former showrunner/executive producer Neal Baer), the show has had characters change or even die as sort of a dramatic plot twist.

Leight went on to talk about the episode and obstacles in David Haden's and Detective Benson's relationship, "They may disagree on a case. She may question his commitment because she's such a crusader. If you work as a No. 2 in a New York City D.A.'s office, you have to have political skill. So I could see her mistaking his political skill for a lack of fervor. And clearly, they're not supposed to be working on the same cases. That'll get a case thrown out of court. The ethical boundary is a huge, huge issue. But then also there's this question of boundaries in a relationship. If both of you do the same kind of stuff, and you're always talking shop — is that healthy for a relationship?"

Mariska Hargitay noted in an interview on The Today Show that "Justice Denied" was, "truly one of (her) favorites." In the interview she also discusses the adoption of her two children in 2011 - Amaya and Andrew - and noted after Christopher Meloni departed the cast it was a difficult adjustment for her at first, but she now says it is "reenergizing to do the same thing that you've been doing for twelve years and with a whole new freshness to it and a new take on it." Hargitay earlier stated in an interview with TV Guide at a benefit in Los Angeles for her Joyful Heart Foundation, "It's going to get complicated, though," warns Hargitay of the relationship between Benson and EADA Haden in "Justice Denied". "But when Chris Meloni was around there was no way Olivia could ever be with anybody else. Now that he's gone, I think she has room in her heart."

Danny Pino said of the episode's subject matter, "The case we're about to work on is one that deals with Fleet Week, and sailors that may or may not be responsible for a rape, Amaro starts to realize that maybe the original attacker wasn't really guilty. He starts to look at the new evidence and starts to question [the original investigation]." Partial scenes and dialog in this episode were taken from another Law & Order: SVU episode in the sixth season titled, "Quarry", which originally aired January 25, 2005. The episode "Quarry" was actually about a seven-year-old who was found dead and sexually assaulted by a serial killer.

== Reception ==
=== Ratings ===
In its original American broadcast on April 11, 2012, "Justice Denied" was approximately viewed by an estimated 5.57 million households with a 1.7 rating/4% share in the age 18–49 demographic. "Justice Denied" was the top performer on NBC that night, beating comedies Betty's White's Off Their Rockers and Best Friends Forever along with poorly rated NBC new's magazine, Rock Center with Brian Williams in the 18-49 age demographic. It was ranked #2 program of the night under CSI on CBS which pulled 9.94 total million viewers and a 2.4 rating/6% share in the 18-49 age demo, SVU beat a special recap episode of ABC's Revenge by 0.1 in the age 18-49 audience.

=== Critical response ===
Teresa L. of TV Fanatic had a mixed review of "Justice Denied"; "Despite the episode's attempt to invoke some sympathy for Benson, I didn't feel sorry for her when she discovered the truth about Pena. It was Pena who deserved that sympathy, and I resented the fact that Benson was sort of made into a victim by the episode's end." She goes on to add, "She's (Mariska's) a strong actress, so it isn't hard to enjoy her scenes. However, I'm feeling a little bored with her storylines; perhaps, this break from her relationship with David will mean a break from Benson as well." She positively noted, "On the bright side this week, I enjoyed watching Amaro not only stand his ground on the Pena issue, but also continue to support Benson when she began to doubt herself. I definitely agreed with Benson when she said he was a good partner. Amaro has the kind of calming and logical presence that really balances out some of the more hot-headed detectives."

TV Guide's Kate Stanhope said of the break-up of Detective Benson and EADA Haden, "Although it was a tearful end, taking such a close peek into Olivia's romantic life was daring by Law & Order standards, and the diversion paid off. Following the sudden departure of Det. Stabler (Christopher Meloni), it was nice, and possibly necessary, to see another door open for her after Stabler's was slammed shut without closure." Stanhope added, "After showing her[self] so emotionally vulnerable at the beginning of the season, the introduction of David Haden gave Olivia room to return to her stronger, more put-together self. And while another door may have closed for Olivia, she opened a window when she told Det. Nick Amaro (Danny Pino) that he was a good partner. Too bad it looks like he has some personal issues of his own to deal with first."

The break-up between EADA David Haden and Detective Olivia Benson made TV Guide's top moments of the week, it ranked #3 in, " Most Heartbreaking Conflict": "As if Law & Order: SVU's Olivia hasn't had enough hard days on the job already, this week she learns that she helped wrongly convict a man of rape eight years ago and that a new unit is being formed to investigate past NYPD actions. Not only will the unit be starting with the sex crimes unit, but Olivia's boyfriend, ADA Haden (Harry Connick Jr.) will head up the effort. Foreseeing the obvious conflict of interest that is about to arise, the couple meets in a darkened bar and decides to pretend that their fledgling relationship never happened. Poor Olivia! First Stabler, and now this?"

"Justice Denied" made number 21 of TV Guide's 2012 Best TV Episodes; "The heartbreaking end feels like a tease and makes us wonder if Olivia will ever find happiness, but the glimpse into her love life, however fleeting, is necessary for someone with whom we've grown close over the last 13 years." said TV Guide.
