= Father Dearest (Law & Order: Special Victims Unit) =

- Law & Order: Special Victims Unit episode
- Dr. Huang (B. D. Wong) returning on special assignment to SVU after a transfer to the FBI's Oklahoma office.
- Episode no.: Season 13; Episode 20
- Directed by: Rosemary Rodriguez
- Story by: John P. Roche; Warren Leight
- Teleplay by: John P. Roche
- Production code: 13021
- Original air date: May 2, 2012

Guest appearances
- James Van Der Beek as Sean Albert; Eric Close as Dr. Colin Barnes; Sonya Walger as Anne Barnes; Shannon Maree Walsh as Cate Avery; Tina Benko as Grace Avery, Gil O'Brien as Irish Barfly; Maria-Christina Oliver as Nancy Dale; Clarke Thorell as Geoff Avery; Ryann Shane as Ashley Riggs; Kathryn Rossetter as Ashley’s mother; Gretchen Egolf as Attorney Kendra Gill; B. D. Wong as Dr. George Huang

Episode chronology
← Previous "Street Revenge"	Next → "Learning Curve"
- Law & Order: Special Victims Unit season 13

"Father Dearest" is the twentieth episode of the thirteenth season of the police procedural television series Law & Order: Special Victims Unit and the 292nd episode overall. It originally aired on NBC in the United States on May 2, 2012. In this episode, the Special Victims Unit requires assistance from their former forensic psychiatrist, Dr. George Huang (B. D. Wong), to track down a twisted seducer of young women.

The episode was written by John P. Roache based on a story developed by Roache and showrunner Warren Leight. It features guest appearances from James Van Der Beek as well as B. D. Wong who reprises his role as Special Agent George Huang for the first time since his departure from the main cast at the end of Season 12.

"Father Dearest" received mostly positive reviews, with critics mostly commenting on the performances of Wong and Van Der Beek. According to Nielsen ratings, the episode's original broadcast was watched by 6.62 million viewers and acquired a 1.9/5% share in the 18–49 demographic. It ranked third in its time slot while being the highest-rated NBC program that evening.

== Plot ==
Detectives Benson and Amaro (Mariska Hargitay and Danny Pino) investigate the disappearance of a girl, Cate (Shannon Maree Walsh), who was researching children born through sperm donation. They learn that Cate was conceived with donor sperm, and that she had tracked down the donor. She was going to meet the man against her mother's wishes.

Tutuola and Rollins (Ice-T and Kelli Giddish) locate the girl, who insists she wasn't kidnapped, but refuses to tell them about her donor father. Rollins notes that on a child donor website that Cate viewed, four other possible girls discussed the same sperm donor; their mystery man suddenly had an urgent need to meet his potential offspring. Tutuola and Amaro interview another teenager (Ryann Shane) who met with "donor 141" through a donor connection website thinking that he was her biological father.

Dr. George Huang (B. D. Wong) says it could be genetic sexual attraction, a condition where children who are separated from their parent or siblings at an early age find a sexual attraction takes place when they're reunited with them. Rollins finds a Dr. Colin Barnes (Eric Close) who matches the description from the file that she and Benson got from the donor bank. Detectives Benson and Amaro meet with Dr. Barnes, his wife Anne (Sonya Walger), and his teenage daughter, Taylor. They ask him about his relationships with his offspring that came through sperm donation. He denies ever seeing or wanting to see any of the children conceived through his sperm. Benson puts Colin in a line-up, but none of the girls identify him as the man claiming to be their father.

The squad checks with Colin and Anne to see if they have any enemies and discover that Colin had a contentious relationship with Phillip Kelly. Colin fired Kelly from the hospital after he discovered him operating while under the influence. Rollins and Fin interview Kelly, who does not fit the description of the suspect. Later, Colin anxiously tells the SVU detectives that his daughter Taylor is missing. The detectives look in Taylor's room and discover that she was listening to the same jazz song, "My One and Only Love", that the other teenage girls were listening to when they danced with their donor father.

Colin tells the detectives about Sean Albert (James Van Der Beek), a former college boyfriend of Anne's whom she stopped seeing when she met Colin. Dr. Barnes had Sean arrested when he discovered him taking the MCAT exam for other people. Anne suddenly receives a text message from Sean who threatens to hurt Taylor unless she meets him at a bar. Later, Fin and Rollins confront Sean at the bar, but he refuses to talk to anyone except Anne. Sean confesses to having a vendetta against Colin and the egotistical attitude he throws in everybody's face. He reached out to Colin's daughter because she needed someone who truly cared for her.

Sean realizes that Anne is watching his interrogation from behind the glass mirror. He says he'll only tell Anne where Taylor is, and only if she dances with him. Anne reluctantly agrees. When the song ends, Sean whispers in her ear that he killed Taylor. Anne screams in agony as everyone rushes in to separate Sean from her. Rollins says killing Taylor doesn't fit Sean's MO. Benson and Amaro follow up a hunch to search east side hotels. They find Taylor in a hotel room, alive and well, awaiting Sean's return. Benson tells Taylor that Sean deceived her, but she insists that he's her real father.

== Production ==
"Father Dearest" was written by John P. Roche (teleplay and story) and showrunner-executive producer Warren Leight (story). Filming of the episode was directed by Rosemary Rodriguez.

=== Cast and guest stars ===
B. D. Wong returns for this episode, portraying his character Dr. George Huang, who helps the SVU detectives find out who is raping young girls who have a common biological father, an unknown sperm donor. Wong was officially cast to the series in Season 4 and stayed until the end of Season 12, his last on-screen appearances in the episode "Bombshell". Wong left SVU to star in another NBC series, Awake, where he also portrays a psychiatrist. Behind the scenes, B. D. Wong shared his character's fascination with the macabre subject matter in this episode:

"This particular case is true to form, really bizarre, and really interesting and full of truth that from real life and drama that's written into the show. I feel really amazed by this particular phenomenon [...] it is this thing called genetic sexual attraction, someone is separated from their biological relative at an early age and reunited with them many years later, what happens is often, much more often than you expect; there is an overwhelming feeling of sexual attraction between them. [...] And in this discussion that we had, I was the only person who said, 'I totally get it', which was alarming to me. Everybody else was like the characters that they play on the show, pretty much, just roll a tape of a scene, the way they responded is pretty much the way they responded which is like, 'Okay there is yet another strange thing in the squad room of SVU being discussed'."

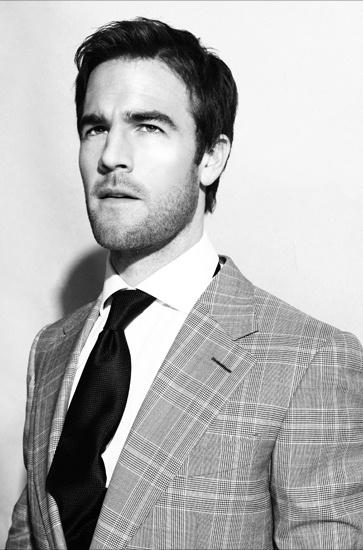
James Van Der Beek (pictured) also guest-starred in the series finale of Law & Order: Criminal Intent.

When TV Guide announced that James Van Der Beek was cast in the episode, he said "I'm [going to] do some more serious drama this year, I love that process. That's what I grew up doing, so sinking my teeth into a meaty role is definitely on the agenda." Van Der Beek later noted to TV Guide, "I find out that he was a sperm donor, so I actually pose as him for girls who are wanting to get in touch with their actual biological father, then when I meet these girls, they have a very strong physical attraction to their father for whatever reason. In Sean's words, he gives them what they need." Van Der Beek has admired star Ice-T since his childhood, "Being arrested by Ice-T? I never thought it would happen when I was 13 years old," Van Der Beek said with a laugh.

In an interview with The Huffington Post, star Kelli Giddish noted a scene in the episode where she and Mariska Hargitay's characters briefly go undercover as lovers:

"It was fun. We had a blast with it. It was the first scene of the day and we went out to set and Mariska's like, 'Hi. Let's go be lovers for a second.' [Laughs.] We were just cracking up. And it's always so much fun to work with Mariska. And any time you get to do a little something different, in terms of being playful or whatever, it's always fun. [..] [We] just showed up and we were like, 'When should we have the hand touch? When does the hand touch happen?' [Laughs.] It was fun. "I mean, you get one creepy script after another. Once you start doing the show, it's just people being really cruel and mean to each other, which is always awful. But [this episode, "Father Dearest"] is creepy because you don't know who it is until the very end and why would someone do that? And the character I play on SVU, she's got a clinical, morbid curiosity about things like this, just what motivates people to do this stuff. So I have to play against getting really creeped out, which is fun. But ever since starting the show, my dreams have been really screwed up."

Giddish also spoke highly of her co-stars and guest star B. D. Wong when asked whether it was intimidating for her because all the cast members know each other from the previous 12 seasons:

"No, I mean, they really love what they do, everybody there. And it's such a pleasant set and everybody gets along. And they totally included me and Danny [Pino] into the fold in a very graceful, hilarious way. The humor on that set ... It's just hysterical. With [Richard] Belzer and Dann Florek. But it was really cool to have B.D. Wong come back because I'd never met him. I'd seen him on the show, but it's like a band that's been together a long time. It's not like you're the new bassist or you're the son, trying to sing like the dad or anything like that. You're just a new part of the team and that's how they treated us. And I really liked how they didn't try to replace [Christopher] Meloni, too. They brought us both in and just took a different turn with it."

=== Soundtrack ===
The John Coltrane and Johnny Hartman version of "My One and Only Love" is used in this episode.

== Reception ==
=== Ratings ===
In its original American broadcast on May 2, 2012, "Father Dearest" was watched by 6.62 million viewers and acquired 1.9 rating/5% share in the 18–49 demographic. "Father Dearest" was the top performer on NBC that night, beating back to back episodes of the Betty White's Off Their Rockers and Rock Center with Brian Williams in both the 18-49 age demographic and total viewers. It was ranked #3 program of the night under ABC's Revenge which had 7.14 total million viewers and a 2.1/6% share in the age 18-49 demo, and CBS's CSI which attained 9.75 million viewers and a 2.3 rating/6% share in the 18-49 demographic.

=== Critical response ===
Teresa L. of TV Fanatic positively reviewed the episode, "I think the success of the episode really did hinge on Van Der Beek's ability to play an angry, obsessed ex-boyfriend with some serious daddy-daughter issues. Luckily, he pulled it off. Just look at the SVU quotes to see just how creepy he can really be. He was really believable in this role, although I'm not sure that's a good thing. Perhaps he might not want to scare off his female fans. Sean was disturbing enough in that final scene to make it difficult to watch reruns of Dawson's Creek without remembering this performance. [...] This episode didn't indulge in the detectives' storylines as much as previous weeks, but I was thrilled to see the return of Dr. George Huang. His character's calming presence, not to mention his great skill as a psychiatrist, is always a welcomed addition to the show."

TV Equals's Kristen Elizabeth positively reviewed Wong's and Van Der Beek's guest roles, "It’s always fun to see Van der Beek play an evil guy; he digs into those kind of roles and this was no exception...But the idea that he could convince girls who truly thought he was their father into sleeping with him...that's just really pushing it. I suppose that's what it takes on SVU now. After 13 seasons, we're all a bit desensitized. It takes willing, if not actually genuine, incest to make us shake our heads. It was nice to see Dr. Wong back after his very quiet departure, although it would have been nicer if they’d given him more to do. He didn’t even get to question the suspect, even though the man was clearly insane. Or at least a sociopath, especially after he made his ex and her husband think he’d killed their daughter, instead of just brainwashing her into believing he was her real father. A very icky episode all around, but with a great guest spot by Van der Beek. Dawson’s come a long, long way."
