= Age progression =

Modification of a photograph of a person to simulate the effect of aging

Age progression is the method involved with changing a photo of an individual to show the impact of maturing on their appearance. Computerized image processing is the most widely recognized procedure, in spite of the fact that craftsmen's drawings are frequently used. Age progression is most frequently utilized as a forensic tool by law enforcement officers to show the likely current appearance of a missing individual anticipated from a photo that might be years old.

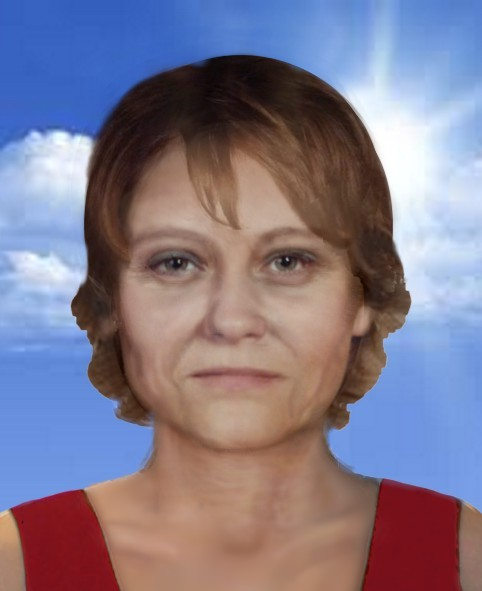
Age progression is often used with missing people who have not been seen for several years, such as Tammie Wilkinson.

== Age progression and law enforcement ==
There are two significant kinds of age progression in the criminal field. Juvenile age progression is utilized to assist with locating abducted and missing children. A face changes significantly between childhood and adulthood. Age progression images have shown to be exceptionally helpful in the recovery of these children. Adult age progression is utilized while attempting to find adult criminals who have evaded law enforcement for an extensive period of time. Both the terms "adult age progression" and "fugitive update" are used, depending on the status of the target individual. Although a lot of work goes into creating an age progression, the level of accuracy can depend on a lot of factors. The age the person was when a photo was last taken of them, and a good timeline of photographs of the person throughout their lives to show how their facial features were changing are several main factors. To try to get an accurate progression, the artist will require photographs of other relatives to perceive how their faces have changed as the years progressed, alongside knowing family characteristics such as when other relatives began losing their hair, on the off chance that the missing individual had any identifying features that would stand out. The way people age is often inherited. Therefore, a close look at pictures of a brother or sister, a mom or a dad, or even a person’s grandparents will give the artist valuable clues about whether to add a double chin or take away half of the person’s hair. It requires years of practice and studying to be a certified specialist creating these photographs, and every illustration can take numerous hours or even days, relying upon the circumstances and the amount of data the artist receives to work with.

== Age progression in media ==
Age progression is an occasional theme in anime/manga, motion pictures, cartoons and comics, literature, and stage performances. One of the earliest mentions is in Greek mythology, where Athena emerged from Zeus' skull fully grown. The protagonist of the Vietnamese Giong legend grew up rapidly.

=== Literature ===
- A classic work where age progression is thwarted rather than accelerated, is Oscar Wilde's The Picture of Dorian Gray; at the end of the story, the protagonist undergoes AP after killing his likeness in a painting, which had previously preserved Gray's youthful appearance.
- In the book Happy Birthday, Dear Amy by Marilyn Kaye, a 13-year-old girl grows into a 25-year-old overnight.

=== Japanese media ===
Age progressions are a well-known theme in Japanese anime and manga. Numerous anime series highlight young ladies changing into frequently attractive women. They go through intricate changes, in which their garments are replaced with mystic outfits, and their bodies are covered by energy streamers. The transformation might be reused in every episode, emphasizing the characters' quality features growing in a comical manner. They may show the women become flushed after the viewing. The earliest known showing of this is the anime/manga series Marvelous Melmo by Osamu Tezuka. In every episode, the little girl Melmo needs to help individuals by mimicking grown-up adults, similar to a stewardess or a policewoman. The plot was imitated in later series like Magical Princess Minky Momo and Fancy Lala. Age progression is a popular subject in hentai manga. There are likewise numerous accounts in which a character gets younger (age regression).

=== Motion pictures ===
- Films in which boys physically become men:
  - Vice Versa (1948)
  - Big (1988)
  - Vice Versa (1988)
  - 14 Going on 30 (1988)
  - A Goofy Movie (1995), Max has a nightmare turning into his father, Goofy.
  - Wait 'til You're Older (2005)
  - The Thief Lord (2006), body swap film in which young girls' souls end up in the bodies of older women.
  - Ben 10: Race Against Time (2007), Ben Tennyson turns into a younger clone of Eon.
  - Conan the Barbarian (2011)
- Films with girls are less likely to have physical transformations:
  - Freaky Friday (four versions, plus a comedy-horror adaptation)
  - 13 Going on 30 (2004)
  - Wish Upon a Star (1996)
  - Sixteen Wishes (2010)
- One example of female age progression is Life in a Day or originally Antidote, a Canadian film about a baby rapidly aging because of a failed cell-accelerating experiment.
- In the opening scene of Alien Resurrection (1997), the Ripley 8 clone morphs from a girl to an adult.

=== Television ===
- The BBC television series Honey, We're Killing the Kids focused on showing parents the consequences of poor parenting using the Age progression technique to estimate how their children may look like as adults if they continue with their present lifestyle, dietary and exercise habits.
- In the Angry Birds Toons episode "Age Rage", the pigs attempt to steal the eggs by using balloons with the aging potion that Red, Chuck, Bomb become elderly, but this backfires when the Minion Pigs and Corporal Pig get hit by them and turn elderly.
- In Ed, Edd n Eddy episode "Take This Ed and Shove It", Eddy hallucinates when he sees himself and the Cul-de-sac as if it was 90 years in the future.

== See also ==
- Forensic science
- Missing person
