= Samantha Soule =

American actress

- Born: April 17, 1980 (age 46); United States
- Occupation: Actress
- Years active: 2008–present

Samantha Soule is an American actress. She is known for her role in the Netflix series Godless, as well as Nurse Jackie, The Blacklist, The Queen's Gambit and Tales of the City. She also appears in the Martin Scorsese film The Irishman. She is also known for her roles in Broadway plays, including Dinner at Eight, and Off-Broadway performances, which include The Other Thing and Killers and Other Family. As a film director, her movies include Midday Black Midnight Blue, for which she also co-wrote the screenplay.

== Theater ==
Soule performed a leading role in a theater festival in 2013 that was devoted to playwright Lucy Thurber, and was titled The Hill Town Plays. It was produced by Rattlestick Playwrights Theater, and took place in a number of theaters in New York City. Soule described the experience to The New York Times saying, "Doing one play is like a novella, but this is like a novel, telling a much bigger story and asking questions that root much deeper." Soule appeared as "Lizzie" in Thurber's play Killers and Other Family, when it premiered in New York, and again when it was revived at Axis Theater One Sheridan Square. Soule's performance in the demanding part, a role of "terrifying physicality", was described as "Enormously powerful and deeply moving."

Soule appeared off-Broadway in The Other Thing, a new play written by Emily Schwend, and produced by the Second Stage Theater. In it she gives a "mesmerizing performance as a woman in constant battle with her own demons." It was a "truly terrifying performance", according to one reviewer. Variety describes Soule as "a riveting onstage presence".

In A. R. Gurney’s play The Dining Room, at the Clurman Theater in New York, she and the cast won a Drama Desk Award for Outstanding Ensemble Performance. The CurtainUp review said of her, "Samantha Soule is multiple-wonderful: as a shy, wide-eyed teenager ... as a young wife and mother who wants to put life with her husband (as well as her Lesbian lover) behind her and come home ... and, most touchingly, as a grandmother with signs of Alzheimer’s."

== Film and television ==
Soule appears in films including No Retreat, How We Got Away with It, and The Irishman―which stars Robert De Niro and is directed by Martin Scorsese. The Irishman is considered "one of his best films".

Soule's appearances on television include Nurse Jackie, The Blacklist, and Law & Order: Special Victims Unit. She appears in the miniseries The Queen's Gambit as Miss Jean Blake, in Tales of the City as Inka, and in the Netflix series Godless as Charlotte Temple. Godless, produced by Steven Soderbergh, is a Western that focuses on women's experiences.

As a film director, Soule's films include Birdwatching and Midday Black Midnight Blue. She also stars in, and wrote the screenplay for Midday Black Midnight Blue, which was nominated for Best Screenplay Award at the 2021 Anchorage International Film Festival. The film is described as "an intimate and stirring portrait of souls struggling through grief in order to at last discover something resembling solace."

== Filmography ==
=== Film ===
Year	Title	Role	Notes
2008	Revolutionary Road	Party Guest	
2013	The Penny Dreadful Picture Show	Alice	
2014	How We Got Away with It	Sarah	
2016	No Retreat	Emily	
2017	Cigarette Soup	Heidi	
2019	The Irishman	Peggy's Godmother	
2022	Midday Black Midnight Blue	Liv	

=== Television ===
Year	Title	Role	Notes
2012	Smash	Donna	1 episode
2012	Law & Order: Special Victims Unit	Ariel Baskins	Episode: "Justice Denied"
2013	Do No Harm	Dana Curtis	1 episode
2014	Blue Bloods	Joyce	1 episode
2014	Nurse Jackie	Anna	1 episode
2016	The Blacklist	Rachel Hobbs	1 episode
2017	Godless	Charlotte Temple	7 episodes
2018	NCIS: New Orleans	Amanda Landry	Episode: "Risk Assessment"
2019	Tales of the City	Inka	4 episodes
2019–2022	City on a Hill	Michaela Freda	5 episodes
2020	FBI: Most Wanted	Emma Kane	Episode: "Reveille"
2020	FBI	Emma Kane	Episode: "American Dreams"
2020	The Queen's Gambit	Miss Jean Blake	1 episode
2020–present	Outer Banks	Anna Carrera	18 episodes
2025	Law & Order	Ashley Davenport	Episode: "Crossing Lines"

=== Videogame ===
Year	Title	Role
2008	Grand Theft Auto IV	Alexandra "Alex" Chilton

== Stage credits ==
Year	Title	Role	Notes
2002	Dinner at Eight	Paula Jordan	Broadway Revival
2007	Coram Boy	Choir	Original Broadway Production
2009	The Philanthropist	Elizabeth	Broadway Revival, Roundabout Theatre Company
2012	A Summer Day	Performer	Off-Broadway
2014	A Fable	Performer	Off-Broadway, World Premiere
2014	And I and Silence	Dee	Off-Broadway, Signature Theatre
2015	Barbecue	Performer	Off-Broadway, Public Theater
2018	Transfers	Performer	Off-Broadway, MCC World Premiere Production
2019	The Convent	Patti	Off-Broadway, A.R.T. New York
