= George Huang (Law & Order: Special Victims Unit) =

Fictional character on Law & Order: Special Victims Unit

Dr. George Huang
- Law & Order: Special Victims Unit character
- First appearance: "Pique" (2001)
- Last appearance: "Career Psychopath" (2026)
- Portrayed by: BD Wong

In-universe information
- Title: Special Agent
- Occupation: FBI agent (retired), Psychiatrist
- Family: Unknown Sister (sister)
- Seasons: 2, 3, 4, 5, 6, 7, 8, 9, 10, 11, 12, 13, 14, 15, 17, 27

Special Agent George Huang is a fictional character on the TV drama Law & Order: Special Victims Unit. He is portrayed by BD Wong.

== Character overview ==
Huang is introduced in the season 2 episode "Pique". He is an FBI agent, who is originally loaned to Manhattan SVU, and later becomes their resident forensic psychiatrist and criminal profiler. He provides them with expert analysis of crime scenes and suspects. His vast knowledge of forensic psychology and psychopathology lends him a preternatural ability to understand, empathize with, and predict the actions of suspects as well as victims. He also has extensive knowledge in the fields of theology, ethnology, and forensics, and speaks fluent Chinese.

Despite a rocky start with the SVU detectives, they come to trust Huang. However, his opinion is not always appreciated. He sometimes agrees with the diagnoses of mental illness provided by defense attorneys and their psychiatrists, making it harder for the Assistant DAs who work with the squad to prosecute criminals.

Like the detectives, Huang has empathy first and foremost with victims of sexual assault, particularly children. He is usually very calm, soft-spoken, and even-tempered, except in a few notable occasions (see below). As a psychiatrist, he sometimes offers his expertise to the detectives themselves, by helping them with any emotional problems they may have. One notable example is the season 6 episode "Charisma". After the detectives see that several children have been murdered in a cult leader's home, Huang sits down with each of the detectives individually to talk them through how they are feeling.

Early in his career as a psychiatrist, Huang worked as a counselor for sex offenders, motivated by a genuine belief that he could rehabilitate them. He quit after a few years, however, frustrated by his patients' unwillingness to truly participate in the therapy. This is also why he went from helping sex offenders to putting them in prison.

Huang is SVU's resident psychiatrist from seasons 3 through 12. He left the main cast after the season 12 episode "Bombshell" and no reason was originally given for his departure. However, Huang returns to aid an SVU investigation in the season 13 episode "Father Dearest"; he facetiously comments that his new assignment in Oklahoma City is "heaven" for a single, gay, Chinese-American man who is opposed to the death penalty.

Huang returns to New York in the season 14 episode "Born Psychopath", and helps the SVU detectives with a case involving a 10-year-old boy exhibiting antisocial behavior. He diagnoses the boy with psychopathy and makes arrangements to get him into a treatment facility. He complains about having to return to Oklahoma near the end of the episode. He also returns in the season 15 episode "Thought Criminal" to evaluate a suspect who has sexual fantasies about torturing and killing children.

Huang does not appear in season 16, but returns in the season 17 episode "Depravity Standard", where he reveals that he took early retirement from the FBI and is now doing consultation work in New York. He testifies in court for the defense of child abductor Lewis Hoda (Tom Sizemore). In doing so, he goes face to face with ADA Rafael Barba (Raúl Esparza) and challenges Lieutenant Olivia Benson's (Mariska Hargitay) interrogation tactics, straining their friendship.

== Notable episodes ==
In the episode "Execution" (#58), Huang is attacked by a serial killer while he and Detective Elliot Stabler (Christopher Meloni) try to get him to confess to a murder.

In the 2009 episode "Lead" (#217), he is attacked in the interrogation room by a murder suspect who had pica, which indirectly caused the suspect to be violent due to consumption of lead-based paint. His diagnosis of the suspect as being brain-damaged due to lead poisoning also motivated ADA Alexandra Cabot (Stephanie March) to seek a more lenient sentence.

In the episode "Crush" (#222), he makes his first on-air arrest as an FBI agent after participating in a sting with the SVU squad against a judge who had committed both state and federal offenses.

In the 2009 episode "Hardwired", he mentions that he is gay after becoming involved in a case in which the leader of a pedophile advocacy group argues that pedophilia is an innate sexual orientation; he says that the implied comparison between homosexuality and pedophilia offends him as a gay man; his actor BD Wong is gay in real life.

In the 2009 episode "Users", he illegally administers ibogaine to treat a heroin addict. When confronted with possible consequences, he says that his work as a physician is more important to him than his own welfare. Afterward, he reports himself to the New York Department of Health, and his license to practice medicine is suspended for 30 days; he states that it was worth it.

== Credits ==
Wong has been credited in 230 episodes of SVU (appearing in 143).

Seasons	Years	Episodes																								
Seasons	Years	1	2	3	4	5	6	7	8	9	10	11	12	13	14	15	16	17	18	19	20	21	22	23	24	25
2	2000–01																									
3	2001–02																									
4	2002–03		×		×	×							×	×		×										×
5	2003–04	×			×			×							×											
6	2004–05			×		×			×	×	×	×	×			×	×	×			×	×				
7	2005–06			×						×				×							×					
8	2006–07	×						×		×			×	×		×			×			×	×			
9	2007–08				×		×		×	×	×	×			×				×	×						
10	2008–09	×	×	×		×	×	×	×	×			×					×	×	×		×				
11	2009–10	×	×	×	×		×		×	×	×	×			×	×					×	×	×	×		
12	2010-11	×		×					×	×	×	×			×	×		×			×	×	×	×	×	
13	2011–12																									
14	2012–13																									
15	2013–14																									
17	2015–16																									
27	2025–26																									
Seasons	Years	1	2	3	4	5	6	7	8	9	10	11	12	13	14	15	16	17	18	19	20	21	22	23	24	25
Seasons	Years	Episodes																								

Regular cast

×	Regular cast + no appearance

Recurring cast

Guest cast

No credit + no appearance

No episode
