= Law & Order: Special Victims Unit season 3 =

Season of American television series (2001–2002)

Law & Order: Special Victims Unit
- Season 3
- Season 3 U.S. DVD cover
- Starring: Christopher Meloni; Mariska Hargitay; Richard Belzer; Stephanie March; Ice-T; Dann Florek
- No. of episodes: 23

Release
- Original network: NBC
- Original release: September 28, 2001 – May 17, 2002

Season chronology
- ← Previous; Season 2 Next → Season 4

The third season of the television series, Law & Order: Special Victims Unit premiered Friday, September 28, 2001 and ended Friday, May 17, 2002 on NBC. It occupied the Friday 10pm/9c timeslot once again.

== Production ==
In the aftermath of 9/11, several cast and crew members volunteered to help the rescue effort. The main title voiceover by Steven Zirnkilton was also changed for one episode only to include the following dedication:

On September 11, 2001, New York City was ruthlessly and criminally attacked. While no tribute can ever heal the pain of that day, the producers of Law & Order dedicate this season to the victims and their families and to the firefighters and police officers who remind us every day with their lives and courage what it truly means to be an American.

Syndicated airings of the episodes replaced this dialogue with the original title voiceover. The opening sequence changed as well; NBC ordered the opening credits for the third season re-edited to remove images of the World Trade Center, which were seen at the beginning and ending; the credit sequences in the previous two seasons were not subsequently changed.

With David J. Burke having left the show at the end of the second season, Neal Baer was the sole showrunner/executive producer of Season 3. During the production of the third season, Baer convinced Amanda Green to begin writing scripts. Green was already serving as a consultant for the series while she worked for the NYPD. The episode "Counterfeit" became her debut as a writer. Tara Butters and Michele Fazekas who also joined the writing staff in the third season enjoyed the freedom of not having to meet with a large team in a writer's room. "As a result, there was no sense of competitiveness. We were working on our own so it was like writing your own mini-feature."

== Cast changes and returning characters ==
All second season main cast members returned for the third season of the series. BD Wong returned to play forensic psychiatrist Dr. George Huang. He was originally contracted to appear in two episodes at the end of the second season and two episodes at the beginning of the third. As Wong puts it "They asked me to come and do four episodes as a kind of audition, to see if it worked, and after those four episodes they asked me to stay on." Wong credited the New York-based show with giving him the opportunity to regularly act in theatre.

Four cast members of SVU who would recur in subsequent years first appeared in the third season. In "Counterfeit," Robert John Burke began playing NYPD Internal Affairs Sergeant Ed Tucker when it is believed that the Special Victims Unit has been guilty of misconduct. Peter Hermann first played Defense Attorney Trevor Langan in "Monogamy," the episode on which Hermann and Hargitay, who would later marry, first met. The show later hinted in future seasons a light romantic flame between them. In "Surveillance," Joel de la Fuente first appears as the Technical Assistance Response Unit analyst Ruben Morales; at auditions the character was called "Burt Trevor," but this name was given to a different technician. Finally, Judith Light joined the recurring cast in "Guilt" as Alex Cabot's strict boss, Bureau Chief ADA Elizabeth Donnelly. Light was already a fan of the program, saying "You can see when you watch a show like this, the level of professionalism going into it."

== Cast ==
=== Main ===
- Christopher Meloni as Senior Detective Elliot Stabler
- Mariska Hargitay as Junior Detective Olivia Benson
- Richard Belzer as Senior Detective John Munch
- Stephanie March as Assistant District Attorney Alexandra Cabot
- Ice-T as Junior Detective Odafin "Fin" Tutuola
- Dann Florek as Captain Donald "Don" Cragen

=== Crossover stars from Law & Order ===
- Dianne Wiest as Interim District Attorney Nora Lewin

=== Recurring cast ===
- Harvey Atkin as Judge Alan Ridenour
- Rob Bartlett as Defense Attorney Milton Schoenfeld
- Lou Carbonneau as Crime Scene Unit Forensics Technician Harry Martin
- Ned Eisenberg as Defense Attorney Roger Kressler
- Joel de la Fuente as Technical Assistance Response Unit Technician Ruben Morales
- Peter Hermann as Defense Attorney Trevor Langan
- Liz Larsen as Defense Attorney Regal
- Jill Marie Lawrence as Defense Attorney Cleo Conrad
- Ron Leibman as Executive Assistant District Attorney Stan Villani
- Judith Light as Bureau Chief Assistant District Attorney Elizabeth Donnelly
- Fernando Lopez as Crime Scene Unit Forensics Technician Ramone Vargas
- Joanna Merlin as Judge Lena Petrovsky
- Audrie Neenan as Judge Marilyn Haynes
- Tom O'Rourke as Judge Mark Seligman
- Susan Pellegrino as Dr. Barrett
- Daniel Sunjata as Crime Scene Unit Forensics Technician Burt Trevor
- Tamara Tunie as Medical Examiner Dr. Melinda Warner
- BD Wong as Dr. George Huang

=== Guest stars ===
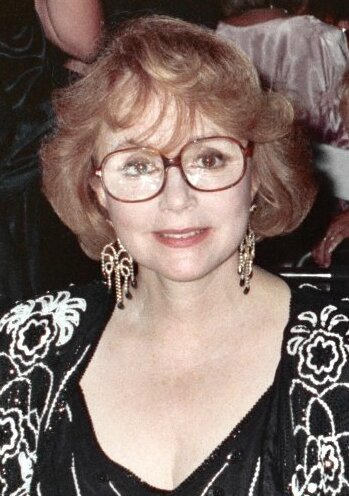
Piper Laurie plays abusive grandmother, Dorothy Rudd in "Care". Neal Baer met Laurie at ER and told Entertainment Weekly, "she played it in a real way that truly was frightening."

The show "Wrath" has been repeatedly mentioned by Mariska Hargitay as one of her favorites. For the episode, Justin Kirk portrayed the wrongfully imprisoned man Eric Plummer. Upon being freed, he kills four people to exact revenge upon the police and Olivia Benson in particular. The scene in which Benson shoots Plummer was described as being very challenging to act. In an interview with Universal Channel, Hargitay said "I shot him dead and some things happened to me physically that I wasn't expecting." Although the video was cut to disguise it, Hargitay in fact mentions two Season 3 episodes in the interview. The second is "Inheritance" which shows Benson identify with a suspect who is a child of rape like herself. Marcus Chong played the suspect Darrell Guan who exemplifies the aggressive characteristics of his father.

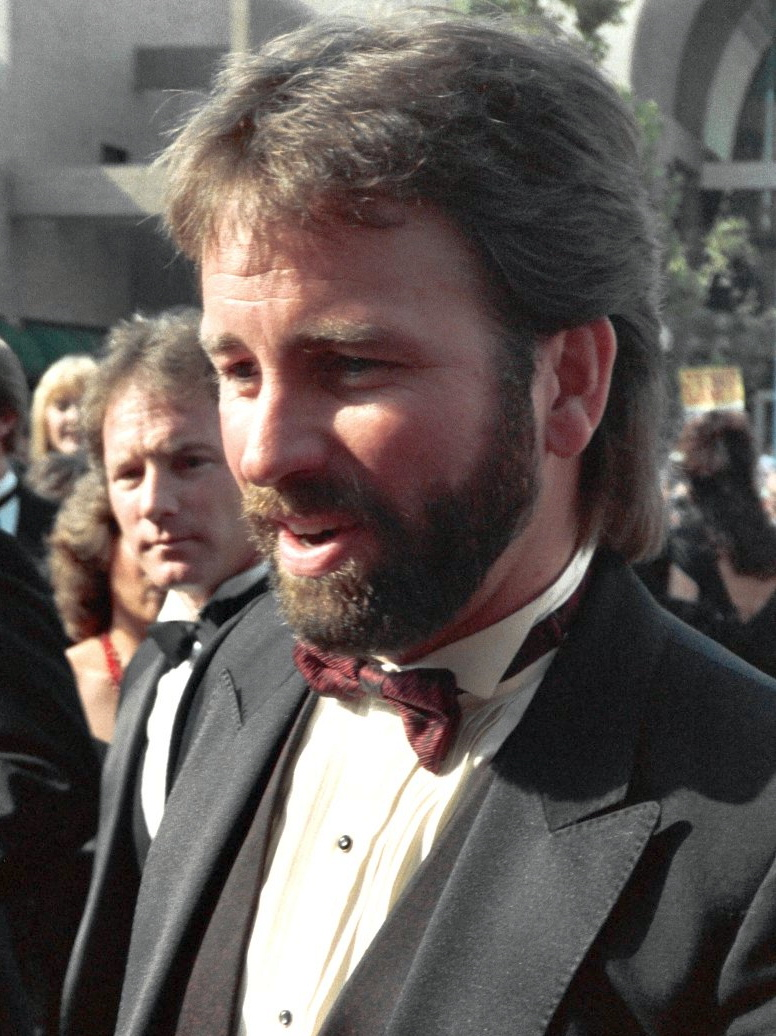
John Ritter plays a doctor accused of killing his wife's baby in "Monogamy" shortly before his 2003 death. NBC's tagline: "See John Ritter as you've never seen him before."

The episode "Ridicule" portrayed a man as a victim of gang rape by women for the first time on network television. The victim Peter Smith was played by Pete Starrett while his rapists were played by Paige Turco and Diane Neal, who would later join the cast playing ADA Casey Novak in the fifth season after Stephanie March left the series. Mike Doyle portrayed Assistant Medical Examiner Karlan in the episode "Prodigy" before portraying CSU Forensics Technician Ryan O'Halloran in the fifth season.

Nick Chinlund guest starred as condemned serial killer Matthew Brodus in the episode "Execution". Chinlund had originally auditioned to portray the role of Detective Elliot Stabler. John Ritter guest starred as Dr. Manning, a psychiatrist who becomes the prime suspect in his wife's baby's murder, in the episode "Monogamy". Ritter was praised for his performance in the episode, which aired shortly before his death; Michael Buckley of TV Guide wrote that "The gradual change in his demeanor makes for a memorable piece of acting."

Martha Plimpton was nominated for the Primetime Emmy Award for Outstanding Guest Actress in a Drama Series for her role in "Denial". She played Claire Rinato, a drug addict who is traumatized by having learned terrible things about her mother, played by Mary Steenburgen. Detective Tutuola tries to help her character recover from the addiction using his background as a narcotics detective. In "Guilt", Bret Harrison played Sam Cavanaugh, a child molestation victim who is reluctant to testify against his abuser. This appearance later helped Harrison secure his best known role in Reaper, which was created by the same writers as "Guilt".

In the second last episode, "Competence", a girl with Down syndrome, played by Andrea Fay Friedman, struggles to prove that she is mentally competent to take care of a child. Lois Smith played the girl's mother and James Badge Dale played the girl's boyfriend. One of the writers of the episode, Robert F. Campbell, mentioned Lois Smith and "Competence" when reflecting on his favourite experiences as an SVU writer. The season finale "Silence" deals with sexual abuse in the Catholic Church. Eric Stoltz portrayed a priest who initially lies to protect clergymen higher up but eventually comes forward with the truth. Charlayne Woodard guest starred in the finale as Sister Peg, a role which she later reprised several times.

== Episodes ==
Law & Order: Special Victims Unit season 3 episodes
No. overall	No. in season	Title	Directed by	Written by	Original release date	Prod. code	U.S. viewers (millions)
44	1	"Repression"	Henry J. Bronchtein	Marilyn Osborn	September 28, 2001	E2310	15.79
When a therapist (Shirley Knight) helps eighteen-year-old Megan Ramsey (Kelly Hutchinson) recall her childhood molestation by her father (Brian Kerwin), she reports the incest to detectives Benson and Stabler hoping it would spare her younger sisters from suffering the same fate. At first her mother (Amy Irving) does not believe her, but eventually her entire family turns on the father, ignoring his protests that are assisted by the discovery of tainted evidence. The whole fragile family later becomes a suspect when the father is murdered. Eventually it is proven Megan is a virgin and the rape was a false memory planted by her therapist. Megan's sister (Blythe Auffarth) confesses to accidentally killing her father and the police arrest the therapist and charge her with reckless endangerment.
45	2	"Wrath"	Jean de Segonzac	Judith McCreary	October 5, 2001	E2314	15.04
Three unrelated people, who are connected to Detective Benson's past cases, are found ritualistically murdered. It turns out that the murderer (Justin Kirk) is bent on revenge because he was previously arrested by Benson and spent years in prison for a crime he did not commit. When this is revealed, Benson is distraught with grief and feels that she has failed her most important duty. Despite the threat to her life, she obsesses over the case and sets out to make things right.: Special Appearance by Ben Gazzara.
46	3	"Stolen"	James Quinn	Jonathan Greene & Robert F. Campbell	October 12, 2001	E2315	17.20
When a baby is abducted from her mother (Kerri Green) in a grocery store, Detectives Benson and Stabler are led to Mark Sanford (Bruce Altman), a private adoption lawyer with dubious business practices. The investigation of the adoption service opens up a twelve-year-old case originally handled by Sgt. Max Greevey and Cragen involving a twelve-year-old boy (Ian Cronin) who has been missing since he was a baby after his mother was murdered. Captain Cragen teams up with Munch to solve the case.
47	4	"Rooftop"	Steve Shill	Teleplay by : Robert F. Campbell & Jonathan Greene; Story by : Neal Baer and Robert F. Campbell & Jonathan Greene	October 19, 2001	E2318	15.44
A series of rapes, each more violent than the previous, takes place in a community of African-Americans. Detectives Tutuola and Stabler promptly suspect a known HIV-positive sex offender (Dorian Missick) who was recently released from jail, however he dies of an overdose and is found on a rooftop. The attacks continue and Detective Tutuola's childhood friends' daughter is killed. As they find nothing, her brother Rodney Thompson (Todd Williams) accuses the police of limiting the budget put on the case. Only when a fifth victim is killed, do her final moments alongside Thompson's persistence give them what they need to find the killer.
48	5	"Tangled"	Jean de Segonzac	Lisa Marie Petersen & Dawn DeNoon	October 26, 2001	E2312	16.51
A known doctor is killed and his wife (Lisa Eichhorn) is raped. Detectives Benson and Stabler question the doctor's estranged and troubled son (Geoffrey Wigdor) from the doctor's previous marriage. They also locate a former patient (John-Lule Montias) who holds a grudge against the doctor. When the rapist then attacks the doctor's former mistress (Liza Weil), the squad realizes that both the wife and the mistress know more than they let on.
49	6	"Redemption"	Ted Kotcheff	Jeff Eckerle	November 2, 2001	E2319	14.58
Detective Stabler is paired with John "Hawk" Hawkins (David Keith), an unstable, "cowboy" cop, much to Benson's chagrin. They try to catch a serial rapist and murderer. Their suspect is a recently released prisoner (Kevin Chamberlin), who was put in jail years ago due to Hawk. Alas, they come to deduce that not only is the predator someone else, but that the former prisoner is innocent of the previous murders, which means that Hawk was responsible for putting an innocent man behind bars.
50	7	"Sacrifice"	Lesli Linka Glatter	Story by : Javier Grillo-Marxuach; Teleplay by : Javier Grillo-Marxuach & Samantha Howard Corbin	November 9, 2001	E2309	16.20
An unidentified man (Mark-Paul Gosselaar) is found shot and sexually assaulted in an alley outside of a gay bar. Detectives Benson and Stabler learn that the victim and his wife (Elizabeth Banks) have a young daughter (Audrey Twitchell) with cystic fibrosis and that they worked in the porn industry to pay for her medical bills. The lead witness (Kevin Geer), who is a recovering drug addict, angers Fin, causing him to re-think his police role.
51	8	"Inheritance"	Juan J. Campanella	Story by : Kathy Ebel; Teleplay by : Kathy Ebel and Michele Fazekas & Tara Butters	November 16, 2001	E2311	14.51
A young Asian woman (Lynn Chen) is severely beaten and raped at a burglary site. Benson and Stabler initially suspect rival Asian gang members, who are in dispute over the victim's loyalty. This theory is disproven when they find another Asian victim and track down serial rapist Darrell Guan (Marcus Chong). Guan was ostracized throughout his childhood and feels that even his own mother (Wai Ching Ho) did not love him. The case hits close to home for Benson because Guan is also the product of a rape. The trial focuses on the impact of genetic predisposition versus environmental upbringing on the nature of violence.
52	9	"Care"	Gloria Muzio	Dawn DeNoon & Lisa Marie Petersen	November 23, 2001	E2317	14.86
A five-year-old girl is found viciously beaten to death in foster care. Detectives Benson and Stabler investigate her complicated family ties. They learn the girl's birth mother (Erika LaVonn) always tried to get back her daughter from the foster mother (Kathleen Wilhoite) and foster grandmother (Piper Laurie). They then investigate her introverted foster brother (Colin Fickes). Captain Cragen manages to reach out to him with the help of a video game.
53	10	"Ridicule"	Constantine Makris	Judith McCreary	December 14, 2001	E2316	15.33
A young wife's body is found after what seems to be an erotic asphyxiation accident. Detectives Benson and Stabler follow her link to a male stripper (Pete Starrett). He reveals their link was that he was recently gang raped by her and her two female lawyer friends, Amelia Chase (Diane Neal) and Pam Adler (Paige Turco) after the three women handcuffed him to a bed during a bachelorette party. ADA Cabot follows People v. Liberta (1984) and sues the women, who are represented by a defense attorney (CCH Pounder), for this non-statutory female-on-male rape. The investigation of one of the women, Pam Adler, then reveals the suicide was in fact a murder, as the victim planned to come clean and expose her fellow rapists.: Special appearance by Dianne Wiest as DA Nora Lewin
54	11	"Monogamy"	Constantine Makris	Michele Fazekas & Tara Butters	January 4, 2002	E2323	17.72
A pregnant woman (Tricia Paoluccio) is attacked and has her baby ripped from her womb. Detectives Benson and Stabler quickly look for the baby hoping he's still alive. The woman's husband (John Ritter) seems shocked, but it is soon discovered she may have had an affair with a construction worker (Bobby Cannavale). In the resulting trial, ADA Alex Cabot tries to find a way to charge the husband while avoiding the controversial territory of reproductive rights.
55	12	"Protection"	Alex Zakrzewski	Jonathan Greene & Robert F. Campbell	January 11, 2002	E2327	16.95
A six-year-old boy is abandoned by his mother (Elpidia Carrillo) in an emergency room after having been shot. Detectives Benson and Stabler look for his missing family members in order to find his shooter (Louie Leonardo) while Munch attempts to get through to the boy's ten-year-old brother (Jean-Luke Figueroa). Eventually, it becomes clear that the whole family is in danger.
56	13	"Prodigy"	Steve Shill	Lisa Marie Petersen & Dawn DeNoon	January 18, 2002	E2326	16.03
A man and a woman are stabbed during a supposedly romantic park encounter. The woman's head as well as her hands are missing, which makes it difficult for detectives Benson and Stabler to identify the victims. They soon learn that the crime scene was staged and that the woman was an officer of the Manhattan Federation for the Prevention of Cruelty to Animals. This leads them to various people from her organization, as well as its opposers, and a young sociopath (Michael Pitt) who had a troubled relationship with the woman. However they soon uncover a more violent suspect (Brian Sullivan) much more close.
57	14	"Counterfeit"	Arthur W. Forney	Amanda Green	January 25, 2002	E2313	16.76
A woman's body is found near her car after she was raped. With Munch on crutches, Tutuola is paired with Benson to investigate what the motive was, as well as why was her car's trunk was full of forged drugs. When another woman, Francesca Jesner (Khrystyne Haje) is raped, she claims the rapist was a cop (Michael O'Keefe) who captured her by using a routine traffic stop. Their need to catch the cop escalates when Jesner is captured again.
58	15	"Execution"	Alex Zakrzewski	Judith McCreary	February 1, 2002	E2325	17.05
In three days, serial killer Matthew Brodus (Nick Chinlund) is to be executed at the New Jersey State Prison. Detective Stabler and Dr. Huang race against time to figure out if he also killed and raped another woman, the confirmation of which will provide closure for her parents (William Hill and Laura Hughes).
59	16	"Popular"	Jean de Segonzac	Story by : Kathy Ebel & Stephen Belber; Teleplay by : Stephen Belber	March 1, 2002	E2329	15.80
Detective Stabler's wife (Isabel Gillies) tells him that her nurse friend (Laura Duncan) at a local hospital treated a fourteen-year-old rape victim (Brittany Slattery), who refused to report the crime to the police or her family. Stabler decides to investigate her unofficially with the help of Detective Benson. They find out she and her classmates were involved with drugs and alcohol, a fact which troubles her family.
60	17	"Surveillance"	Steve Shill	Jeff Eckerle	March 8, 2002	E2328	16.39
A young cellist, Cassie Germaine (Emily Deschanel) is attacked in her apartment. Detectives Benson and Stabler investigate her orchestra conductor, Robert Prescott (Michael Nader). They learn he was involved with amateur erotic filmmaking, and that her apartment is surrounded with hidden cameras installed by a stalker.
61	18	"Guilt"	David Platt	Michele Fazekas & Tara Butters	March 29, 2002	E2332	14.41
ADA Cabot works with a reluctant witness (Bret Harrison) and his mother (Kay Lenz) in a case of child molestation. She goes far beyond the line of duty to find evidence against the abuser (Beau Gravitte). She even sends Detectives Benson and Stabler to illegally search the boy's home and almost ruins the case and all of their careers.
62	19	"Justice"	Juan J. Campanella	Dawn DeNoon & Lisa Marie Petersen	April 5, 2002	E2331	16.60
The stepdaughter of a judge (Keir Dullea) is raped and killed. The judge is known for throwing hard sentences on sex offenders. However, family secrets are revealed when the detectives learn that the girl was a pen pal with many of the inmates put away by her stepfather. Absent: Richard Belzer as John Munch
63	20	"Greed"	Constantine Makris	Robert F. Campbell & Jonathan Greene	April 26, 2002	E2330	14.22
The wife (Mary Beth Hurt) of a businessman (Henry Winkler) is found raped and bludgeoned on their kitchen floor. With Munch on jury duty, Fin is paired with Cragen while Benson and Stabler head the investigation. Uncovering similarities with a previous attack, the detectives first suspect a serial rapist. Soon, however, the evidence leads to an elaborate and sinister plot.
64	21	"Denial"	Steve Shill	Judith McCreary	May 3, 2002	E2334	16.72
A drug addict (Martha Plimpton) is sexually assaulted. In her purse, detectives Benson and Stabler find a decomposing baby's finger. When looking for both her attacker and the baby, they suspect she might be withholding information to protect her mother (Mary Steenburgen) or grandmother (Estelle Parsons). Tutuola tries to help by getting her clean. Absent: Richard Belzer as John Munch
65	22	"Competence"	Jud Taylor	Teleplay by : Jonathan Greene & Robert F. Campbell; Story by : Jeff Eckerle and Jonathan Greene & Robert F. Campbell	May 10, 2002	E2335	17.29
A woman (Lois Smith) reports her twenty-two-year-old daughter with Down syndrome (Andrea Fay Friedman) is pregnant because a rapist (Matt DeCaro) took advantage of her innocence about sex. Detectives Benson and Stabler have to make sure that it is not just her mother being overprotective and in denial of her daughter's sex life. The girl's boyfriend (James Badge Dale) who also has Down Syndrome offers to help raise her baby. ADA Cabot then has to interfere and take on her superior, to settle the mother–daughter dispute on whether the daughter should have an abortion or not.
66	23	"Silence"	Steve Shill	Patrick Harbinson	May 17, 2002	E3103	14.27
A murder takes place in a church. Detectives Benson and Stabler learn that the murderer (Sean Dugan) had been paid off by the church to stop him from reporting how he was sexually abused by a priest as a child. He blames the church for taking away his innocence and accuses a priest from his youth, Father Michael (Eric Stoltz) of molesting him.
