= Law & Order: Special Victims Unit season 6 =

Season of American television series

Law & Order: Special Victims Unit
- Season 6
- Season 6 U.S. DVD cover
- Starring: Christopher Meloni; Mariska Hargitay; Richard Belzer; Diane Neal; Ice-T; BD Wong; Dann Florek
- No. of episodes: 23

Release
- Original network: NBC
- Original release: September 21, 2004 – May 24, 2005

Season chronology
- ← Previous; Season 5 Next → Season 7

The sixth season of the television series, Law & Order: Special Victims Unit premiered September 21, 2004 and ended May 24, 2005 on NBC. It aired on Tuesday nights at 10pm/9c. In January 2005, when the season was halfway through airing, Mariska Hargitay won the Golden Globe Award for Best Actress – Television Series Drama, becoming the first regular cast member of any Law & Order series to win a Golden Globe.

== Production ==
Emmy Ann Wooding, a long time assistant at Wolf Films, died in a car accident while the sixth season was being filmed. The seventh episode "Charisma" was dedicated to her memory. Towards the end of the season, Law & Order: Special Victims Unit crossed over with the third Law & Order franchise spin-off, Law & Order: Trial by Jury with two episodes: "Night" in SVU and "Day" in TBJ. In the episode, Casey Novak is beaten unconscious by an Islamic fundamentalist. In an interview for USA Network, Diane Neal, who did her own stunts, revealed that she passed out due to an error in how they acted out the scene.

In an interview about Season 6, Mariska Hargitay mentioned that filming of the night time scenes took place on Tuesday and Friday nights, when finished episodes were airing. The same interview explained how she provided input to the writing of the episode "Doubt". Hargitay, who is a trained rape crisis counselor, said: "I made Neal take a tour of the rape treatment center. Because once I became a counselor I could say, 'No, this isn't how we do it.'" "Doubt", which is noted for not revealing the jury's verdict, focused on a student and her professor and the difficulty in determining whether their encounter was rape or consensual sex. NBC conducted an online poll, which revealed that 60% of the viewers were in favor of a "not guilty" verdict. Filming of the episode ran long because of a truck that would not start. According to producer Gail Barringer, "It was at night and we had a long delay, we went really late. It's the worst feeling to keep looking at your watch. We want it all to be perfect, but your watch just screams at you."

During the sixth season, sound mixer Bill Daly, who had been with the show since its inception, elaborated on the audio equipment used by SVU. This included Lectrosonics receivers and interruptible foldbacks set up so that everything was wireless.

== Cast changes and returning characters ==
All main cast members present at the end of the fifth season returned for the sixth. Stephanie March, who left the show early in Season 5, returned as Alexandra Cabot in the sixteenth episode "Ghost".

In the episode "Outcry", John Schuck played the NYPD's Chief of Detectives which became a recurring part. The episodes "Weak", "Contagious" and "Identity" starred Mary Stuart Masterson as Dr. Rebecca Hendrix, a psychiatrist and former cop. After confirming that Hendrix was needed while BD Wong was acting in theatre, Neal Baer stated that the character also gave him an opportunity to introduce a conflict between Benson and Stabler and said "Stabler hasn't always felt warmly toward psychiatry, but he does warm up to this character - who has been both a cop and a shrink." The character Dr. Amy Solwey from the fifth season returned in the episode "Parts". Played by Marlee Matlin, Neal Baer said "Munch got very involved with her character, and we thought, Wow, that's really moving‚ let's bring her back."

== Cast ==
=== Main ===
- Christopher Meloni as Det. Elliot Stabler
- Mariska Hargitay as Det. Olivia Benson
- Richard Belzer as Det. John Munch
- Diane Neal as ADA Casey Novak
- Ice-T as Det. Fin Tutuola
- BD Wong as Dr. George Huang
- Dann Florek as Capt. Don Cragen

=== Special guest star ===
- Stephanie March as ADA Alexandra Cabot

=== Crossover stars ===
- Fred Dalton Thompson as DA Arthur Branch (crossing over with Law & Order and Law & Order: Trial by Jury)
- Bebe Neuwirth as Homicide Bureau Chief DA Tracey Kibre (crossing over with Law & Order: Trial by Jury)

=== Recurring cast ===
- Paul Borghese as Officer Tanner
- Philip Bosco as Judge Joseph Terhune
- Caren Browning as CSU Captain Judith Siper
- William H. Burns as Officer Robbins
- Patricia Cook as Elizabeth Stabler
- Viola Davis as Defense Attorney Donna Emmett
- Mike Doyle as CSU Forensics Technician Ryan O'Halloran
- Ned Eisenberg as Defense Attorney Roger Kressler
- Joel de la Fuente as TARU Technician Ruben Morales
- Nicholas Gonzalez as Det. Mike Sandoval
- Peter Hermann as Defense Attorney Trevor Langan
- Kevin Jiggetts as Officer Green
- Donnetta Lavinia Grays as Officer Ramirez
- Jill Marie Lawrence as Defense Attorney Cleo Conrad
- Judith Light as Bureau Chief ADA Elizabeth Donnelly
- Adam Kulbersh as TARU Technician Ben Suarato
- Mary Stuart Masterson as Dr. Rebecca Hendrix
- Joanna Merlin as Judge Lena Petrovsky
- Joseph E. Murray as EMT Olson
- Audrie J. Neenan as Judge Lois Preston
- J. Paul Nicholas as Defense Attorney Linden Delroy
- Tom O'Rourke as Judge Mark Seligman
- Joselin Reyes as Paramedic Martinez
- Ali Reza as Dr. Rohit Mehta
- Triney Sandoval as TARU Technician Echevarria
- Jeffrey Scaperrotta as Dickie Stabler
- John Schuck as Chief of Detectives Muldrew
- Allison Siko as Kathleen Stabler
- Sheila Tousey as Judge Danielle Larsen
- Tamara Tunie as ME Dr. Melinda Warner
- Charlayne Woodard as Sister Peg

=== Guest stars ===
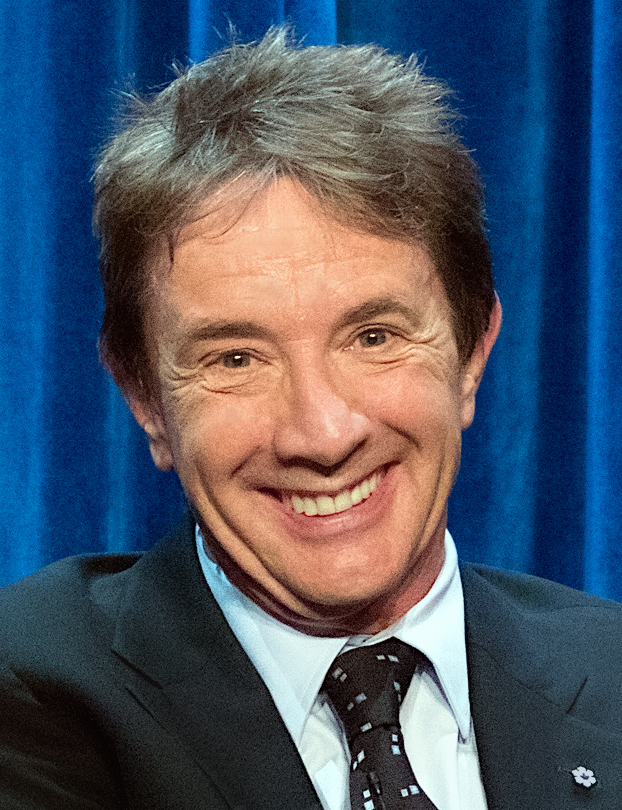
In the episode "Pure", Martin Short portrayed Sebastian Ballentine, a self-described psychic who is later found out to be a convicted serial rapist who targets virgins.

In the season premiere "Birthright", Lea Thompson starred as a mother who lets her maternal instincts go out of control. Her character arranged for the kidnapping of a girl played by Abigail Breslin. Neal Baer opined in an interview that "The premiere with Lea Thompson really moved people." In the same interview, Baer said "The one with Ming Na was beautifully made. It gave you a sense of Chinatown that you don't usually see on TV." In "Debt", Ming-Na played a woman who gets in over her head with a Chinese gang specializing in smuggling and extortion.

The third episode "Obscene" starred Lewis Black as a shock jock whose right to free speech comes under attack. This is prompted by an overprotective mother played by Dana Delany. SVU writers had been asking Delany to do a show for years and wrote the part with her in mind. According to Delany, "It deals with First Amendment rights and a Howard Stern type character. I think it presents both sides of the argument well." Kyle MacLachlan starred in the episode "Conscience" as a grieving father who notices an opportunity to eliminate a sociopath. MacLachlan later pointed out "I took matters into my own hands and actually got away with it which was one of the few times on SVU that that happens."

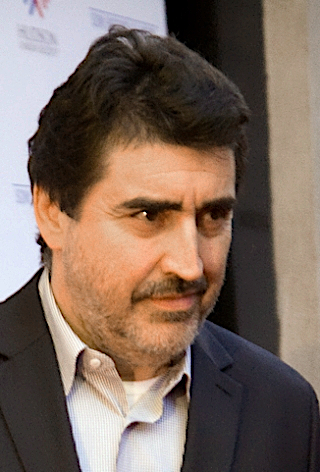
Alfred Molina guest starred in the crossover episode "Night". He was already a long time viewer of Law & Order and would go on to play a starring role in its Los Angeles based spin-off.

The episode "Charisma" saw Jeff Kober play a lying and manipulative cult leader. Mariska Hargitay described his character as "The most charismatic, genius-like serial-killer-cult-leader that doesn't think he's doing anything wrong." For her performance in "Weak", Amanda Plummer won the Primetime Emmy Award for Outstanding Guest Actress in a Drama Series. Plummer played Miranda Cole, a paranoid schizophrenic who struggles to recount the details of her rape. Dallas Roberts (who would later guest star as Dr. Gregory Yates in Season 16 and Season 17) played her attacker. In "Contagious", child actress Jennette McCurdy played Holly Purcell, a traumatized nine-year-old rape victim. For an interview in 2008, McCurdy wrote "My favorite job to this day has been Law & Order: Special Victims Unit. I played a girl who had been badly abused, so the part involved lots of crying and seriousness."

In "Haunted", Ernest Waddell made his first of what would become several appearances as Fin Tutuola's son Ken Randall. The character had been mentioned in previous seasons but never shown. Neal Baer stated that the plan to reveal family members slowly was intentional with "We like revealing those kinds of things about a character - as you would in any workplace where you know the people. You work with them, they're your 'workplace family', but you may not know about other details until issues come up that reveal those details." This episode was referenced in an interview with Ice T who said "When you add children to it, Fin kind of softens up." In "Rage", Matthew Modine portrayed Gordon Rickett, a serial killer who shares a history with Detective Stabler. When announcing the episode, Neal Baer said that Stabler "must now confront his own built up rage, before it leads to tragedy."

Marlee Matlin reprised her role from the fifth season in the episode "Parts". She praised Richard Belzer's performance for a second time and expressed excitement over being able to portray her SVU character in two seasons: "When I had heard that the producers had never brought back a perp to reprise a role, I was very honored. Amy is such a complex and troubled character and one I could easily see return." ADA Novak took on the Department of Defense in the season finale "Goliath". The incident inspiring her to do so involved an ex-military police officer played by R. E. Rogers. Rogers had previously played an ex-military character in the show's second season.

== Episodes ==
Law & Order: Special Victims Unit season 6 episodes
No. overall	No. in season	Title	Directed by	Written by	Original release date	Prod. code	U.S. viewers (millions)
117	1	"Birthright"	Arthur W. Forney	Jonathan Greene	September 21, 2004	E5201	14.20
The SVU detectives investigate the attempted kidnapping of a six-year-old girl (Abigail Breslin). The man behind the attempt (Ned Bellamy) is revealed to be a private investigator hired by a woman (Lea Thompson) who is convinced that she is the girl's biological mother. This claim uncovers a fertility doctor (David Forsyth) with a scheme to steal embryos and give them to different parents, prompting a custody battle between the egg donor mother and the birthparents (Beau Gravitte and Camilla Scott).
118	2	"Debt"	David Platt	Amanda Green	September 28, 2004	E5203	13.00
A child abandonment incident prompts Benson and Stabler to investigate the disappearance of a mother. They learn from her sister (Ming-Na Wen) that she made a deal with human traffickers to have her teenage daughter (Jenny Wong) smuggled to New York from China. It is revealed that the teenage immigrant has been forced into prostitution and her life is subsequently used as a bargaining chip by the gangsters to avoid prosecution. When the squad captures the gang's leader (Jack Yang), Detective Stabler is able to get help from one of his junior members (Aaron Yoo) by convincing him that the bright future he was promised is a lie. After arresting a corrupt immigration attorney (Loren Dean), the NYPD finally learns where the captive women are being held. Detective Stabler arrives just in time to keep the promise he made.
119	3	"Obscene"	Constantine Makris	José Molina	October 12, 2004	E5205	12.35
A teenage actress (Maggie Grace) is raped while sleeping in her trailer. The producer (Nestor Serrano) of the show, which features sexually suggestive content, suspects that the rape was orchestrated as part of a media decency campaign led by a protective mother (Dana Delany). The SVU discovers that it was her son (Ricky Ullman) who committed the rape because he thought it would impress a radio shock jock (Lewis Black). This leads to two trials focusing on the influence and power of entertainment media.
120	4	"Scavenger"	Daniel Sackheim	Dawn DeNoon & Lisa Marie Petersen	October 19, 2004	E5207	12.62
The SVU squad races against the clock to solve the puzzles and uncover the clues scattered throughout the city by a taunting copycat serial killer (Doug Hutchison). With the help of his mother (Anne Meara), the squad is able to save a survivor of the original crimes (Elizabeth Franz). This storyline was inspired by the BTK Killer.
121	5	"Outcry"	Constantine Makris	Patrick Harbinson	October 26, 2004	E5202	13.01
A missing high school student (Amanda Seyfried) is found at a construction site, claiming that she was raped by several men in uniform. In what becomes an increasingly fraught investigation, Benson and Stabler have to deal not only with the media frenzy surrounding the case, but also with the girl's changing account of the events.
122	6	"Conscience"	David Platt	Roger Wolfson & Robert Nathan	November 9, 2004	E5208	14.30
The five-year-old son (Michael and Max Illes) of a psychiatrist (Kyle MacLachlan) disappears from a birthday party, and is later found dead by the police. As the detectives investigate, the pool of suspects gradually shrinks, until the evidence eventually points in an unexpected direction (Jordan Garrett).
123	7	"Charisma"	Arthur W. Forney	Michele Fazekas & Tara Butters	November 16, 2004	E5206	16.38
The investigation of an impregnated twelve-year-old girl (Holliston Coleman) leads to a charismatic cult leader (Jeff Kober), who turns on his own followers and escapes as the detectives attempt to search his premises. Tracking him down proves difficult as the people with strong ties to him, including the girl's mother (Shannon Cochran), have been brainwashed. Due to unusual circumstances in the squadroom, Benson teams up with Munch in the ensuing manhunt.
124	8	"Doubt"	Ted Kotcheff	Marjorie David	November 23, 2004	E5209	15.21
When a college student (Shannyn Sossamon) claims rape and her professor (Billy Campbell) claims it was consensual sex, Stabler and Benson find themselves in the middle of a "he said, she said" battle. The argument indirectly reveals that Stabler has become separated from his wife. Stabler initially believes the professor but changes his mind when he sees him manipulate his daughter (Carolyn Miller). Benson initially believes the student but changes her mind when she stages a suicide attempt to gain sympathy. Unsure of where blame lies, they make their way to the courtroom to hear the jury's verdict.
125	9	"Weak"	David Platt	Michele Fazekas & Tara Butters	November 30, 2004	E5213	15.30
In their investigation of a serial rapist, the detectives enlist the help of a former cop turned psychiatrist (Mary Stuart Masterson) in order to reach out to a paranoid schizophrenic (Amanda Plummer), who remembers being attacked by the perpetrator but is unable to express her account of it.
126	10	"Haunted"	Juan J. Campanella	Amanda Green	December 7, 2004	E5212	13.50
In the aftermath of a bodega robbery, Detective Tutuola's past as a narcotics officer catches up with him when a grief-stricken mother (Jeanetta Arnette) blames him for her estranged daughter's spiralling drug abuse. Fin teams up with a young narcotics detective (Nicholas Gonzalez) and sets out to make things right.
127	11	"Contagious"	Aaron Lipstadt	Jonathan Greene	January 11, 2005	E5214	15.95
A medical exam of a nine-year-old girl (Jennette McCurdy) who survived a car accident with her parents reveals that she was a victim of sexual abuse. Out of fear and desperation, she ends up blaming the wrong suspect (Daniel Hugh Kelly), leading to a rash of false accusations against him by other girls. However the SVU finds out she was actually victimized by someone who acted like a witness (Zach Gilford).
128	12	"Identity"	Rick Wallace	Lisa Marie Petersen & Dawn DeNoon	January 18, 2005	E5215	15.34
Complications ensue in the investigation of a gang member who fell off a building after the victim that he tried to rape bit him in self-defense. When Detectives Benson and Stabler are sure that they have found the victim, his twin sister admits to biting the gang member, even though the bite came from someone who was chromosomally male (both twins are portrayed by Reiley McClendon). The twins are shocked at the revelation that their parents (John Bolger and Hillary Bailey Smith) tried to raise one of them as a girl after a botched circumcision. Investigation reveals more regarding the ulterior motive of a doctor (Peter Firth) to prove that nurture supersedes nature. Partially inspired by the case of David Reimer.
129	13	"Quarry"	Constantine Makris	José Molina	January 25, 2005	E5217	14.19
The body of a seven-year-old child reported missing in 1980 is found and Benson and the squad begins to investigate convicted serial killer Lucas Biggs (John Savage) who is on death row in Virginia. While Biggs can detail every child he ever molested, he swears he has no memory of this one. Benson soon learns that the boy was killed by one of Biggs' former victims (Terry Serpico) who, unbeknownst to his wife (Angelica Torn), lives a secret life as a child molester passing on the abusive habits he learned. Someone kills the suspect before he can be picked up. When a man (Michael Shannon) confesses to picking off a rapist, Benson needs to decide whether he committed the crime or whether he confessed out of trauma and shame.
130	14	"Game"	David Platt	Patrick Harbinson	February 8, 2005	E5216	14.18
A rape / murder preceded by a vehicular assault against the victim is discovered to be a recreation of a violent video game called Intensity. Interviewing the game's creators leads the detectives to a former employee (Matthew Faber), who then leads them to a teenage couple (Seth Gabel and Trisha LaFache) who claim to be unable to distinguish fantasy from reality.
131	15	"Hooked"	Jean de Segonzac	Joshua Kotcheff	February 15, 2005	E5211	13.76
When the body of a teenager (Janae Kram) is found with an ID belonging to her older cousin (Jessica Dunphy), Benson and Stabler learn that she and her best friend (Hayden Panettiere) were sexually promiscuous. They later learn that she was an HIV-positive prostitute working for a porn director (Matt Malloy), and the object of an older man's obsession.
132	16	"Ghost"	David Platt	Amanda Green	February 22, 2005	E5218	14.03
A series of drug-related hits leads the detectives back to the notorious drug lord Cesar Velez. The detectives are left with one survivor (Reymond Wittman), a scared child whom the drug lords are trying to finish off. The gun used in the murders is linked to Liam Connors (Brían F. O'Byrne), one of Velez's top agents. Connors has a strong defense which almost gets him acquitted until Benson and Stabler arrest him for trying to kill ADA Alexandra Cabot a year earlier. Alex returns from witness protection to assist with the case.
133	17	"Rage"	Juan J. Campanella	Michele Fazekas & Tara Butters	March 1, 2005	E5219	12.29
The discovery of a body leads to a man (Matthew Modine) arrested by Stabler fourteen years ago. Stabler swears that he will not let him get away with rape and murder for a second time. The squad can only hold him for twenty-four hours, but after a visceral interrogation are able to glean enough information during that time period to have a place to start. Cragen and Benson both worry that Stabler will let his hatred for the suspected child molester interfere with his ability to do his job.
134	18	"Pure"	Aaron Lipstadt	Dawn DeNoon	March 8, 2005	E5220	14.73
An eighteen-year-old girl (Molly Bea Spears) is abducted by a rapist, causing her family (Marianne Hagan and Taylor Spreitler) to offer a substantial reward for her safe return. A self-proclaimed psychic (Martin Short) comes forward claiming to have information and the girl is found dead shortly thereafter. Stabler refuses to believe that the man in the squadroom is a real psychic. As he drops hints and plays calculating mind games, it becomes increasingly apparent that either he or his wife (Mary Mara) is involved.
135	19	"Intoxicated"	Marita Grabiak	Jonathan Greene	March 29, 2005	E5221	14.56
A fifteen-year-old girl (Danielle Panabaker) is caught about to have sex with her twenty-one-year-old boyfriend (Jon Foster) by her mother (Cathy Moriarty), who demands that the police charge him with statutory rape, despite her daughter's objections. On their way to the hospital, Benson calls a children's rights lawyer (Glenne Headly) who interrupts the exam. This backfires when the mother is found brutally murdered and the young lovers are the prime suspects. The detectives try to piece together what led to the murder and discover a history of violence and alcohol abuse by the deceased.
136	20	"Night"	Arthur W. Forney & Juan J. Campanella	Story by : Amanda Green & Chris Levinson; Teleplay by : Amanda Green	May 3, 2005	E5224	16.54
Benson and Stabler investigate the rape and murder of a woman found with a wad of money stuffed in her mouth. They trace the money to a lawyer (Bradley Cooper) handling the finances of a wealthy family. The woman (Angela Lansbury) demands that the detectives stay away from her son (Alfred Molina) even though they suspect that he preys on illegal immigrants who do not report the crimes out of fear of getting deported. The people are short on evidence until a Bosnian immigrant has the courage to come forward. Angry about exposing the fact that she was raped, her brother (Stelio Savante), an Islamic fundamentalist, brutally assaults ADA Casey Novak.: This episode begins a crossover with Law & Order: Trial by Jury that concludes on "Day".; Special appearances by Bebe Neuwirth as ADA Tracey Kibre, Kirk Acevedo as DA Investigator Hector Salazar and Fred Thompson as DA Arthur Branch.
137	21	"Blood"	Félix Alcalá	Patrick Harbinson	May 10, 2005	E5223	14.50
A young woman (Lauren Hodges) reports that her baby has been tossed out of a car. Benson and Stabler learn that she is addicted to prescription pain killers and this leads them to an elderly woman (Melinda Dillon) who lives with her son (Matt Schulze) and daughter-in-law (Christine Elise). The young woman identifies the daughter-in-law as the one who sold her the drugs, but when the detectives go to confront her, they find the drug dealer dead. Stabler uses his influence as a police officer when his daughter, Kathleen, is arrested for drunk driving.
138	22	"Parts"	Matt Earl Beesley	David Foster	May 17, 2005	E5204	16.21
After a woman's head is found in a car junkyard, SVU detectives track it down to the black market. This journey exposes them to the tragic lives of people who die waiting for kidney transplants. Through the organ dealer (Marc Grapey), Stabler and Munch learn that the parents (Kevin Carroll and Cherita Armstrong) of a dying boy (Tyler James Williams) broke the law to get him on the fast track to receiving a kidney. The two begin to feel like they cost an innocent person his life until someone close to Munch (Marlee Matlin) makes a sacrifice.
139	23	"Goliath"	Peter Leto	Michele Fazekas & Tara Butters	May 24, 2005	E5225	16.38
After the wife (Amy Landecker) of a police officer (R. E. Rodgers) claims her husband raped her, Benson and Stabler arrest the man and come close to believing his version of events when he attacks his captain (Ronni Lieberman). When another officer (Brian Hutchison) murders his wife and attempts to kill himself that same night, the whole force gets involved and soon realizes that the two men both recently returned home from Afghanistan, where they were given the drug Quinium, an anti-malarial. With the reluctant help of a reporter (Jon Bernthal) and a base doctor with an attack of conscience (John Dossett), Novak takes on the U.S. Army.: The episode has close resemblances to the story of the anti-malarial drug Mefloquine.; Special appearance by Fred Thompson as DA Arthur Branch.
