= Monique Jeffries =

Fictional character on Law & Order: Special Victims Unit

- Law & Order character
- First appearance: "Payback" (season 1)
- Last appearance: "Runaway" (season 2)
- Portrayed by: Michelle Hurd

In-universe information
- Title: NYPD Detective
- Partner: Ken Briscoe; John Munch
- Seasons: 1, 2

Detective Monique Jeffries is a fictional character played by Michelle Hurd in the American crime drama television series Law & Order: Special Victims Unit on NBC. A regular character during the first season, Jeffries is a tough and street-wise detective with the New York City Police Department's Special Victims Unit, and briefly the partner of John Munch (Richard Belzer). After being traumatized by a near-death experience, Jeffries is relieved of active duty when she admits to having sex with a suspect in a previous rape case.

Hurd was cast after having appeared in other television shows by Law & Order creator Dick Wolf. Although Wolf promised her Jeffries would develop more over time, Hurd grew frustrated with the lack of material for her character. The show's producers hesitated to keep her as Munch's full-time partner and considered eliminating the character from the show altogether. Hurd eventually departed herself to join the drama television series Leap Years. The actress earned some critical praise for her performance as Jeffries, but several commentators said the character was never properly fleshed out.

== Character biography ==
Monique Jeffries is a tough and street-wise detective with the Special Victims Unit of the New York City Police Department. After briefly partnering with Ken Briscoe (Chris Orbach), she becomes the permanent partner of John Munch (Richard Belzer) after his previous partner, Brian Cassidy (Dean Winters), leaves the unit. The two occasionally clash personalities and have a sarcastic rapport with each other. While chasing a rape suspect during one case, Jeffries is nearly killed when the suspect gets into a car that explodes. She initially appears traumatized by the incident, but later feels exhilarated over having survived and starts behaving recklessly. She has several one-night stands with multiple partners (sometimes together) and takes greater and greater risks at work, becoming something of a loose cannon. One night at a bar, she meets a man who had been a suspect in a previous rape case and has sex with him. When she reveals the incident during a session with a police therapist, she is taken out of active duty per One Police Plaza and works a desk job. She objects to the transfer and threatens to sue the department. Instead, she is transferred to the Vice department, and her old job in the Special Victims Unit is taken by Fin Tutuola (Ice-T).

== Development ==
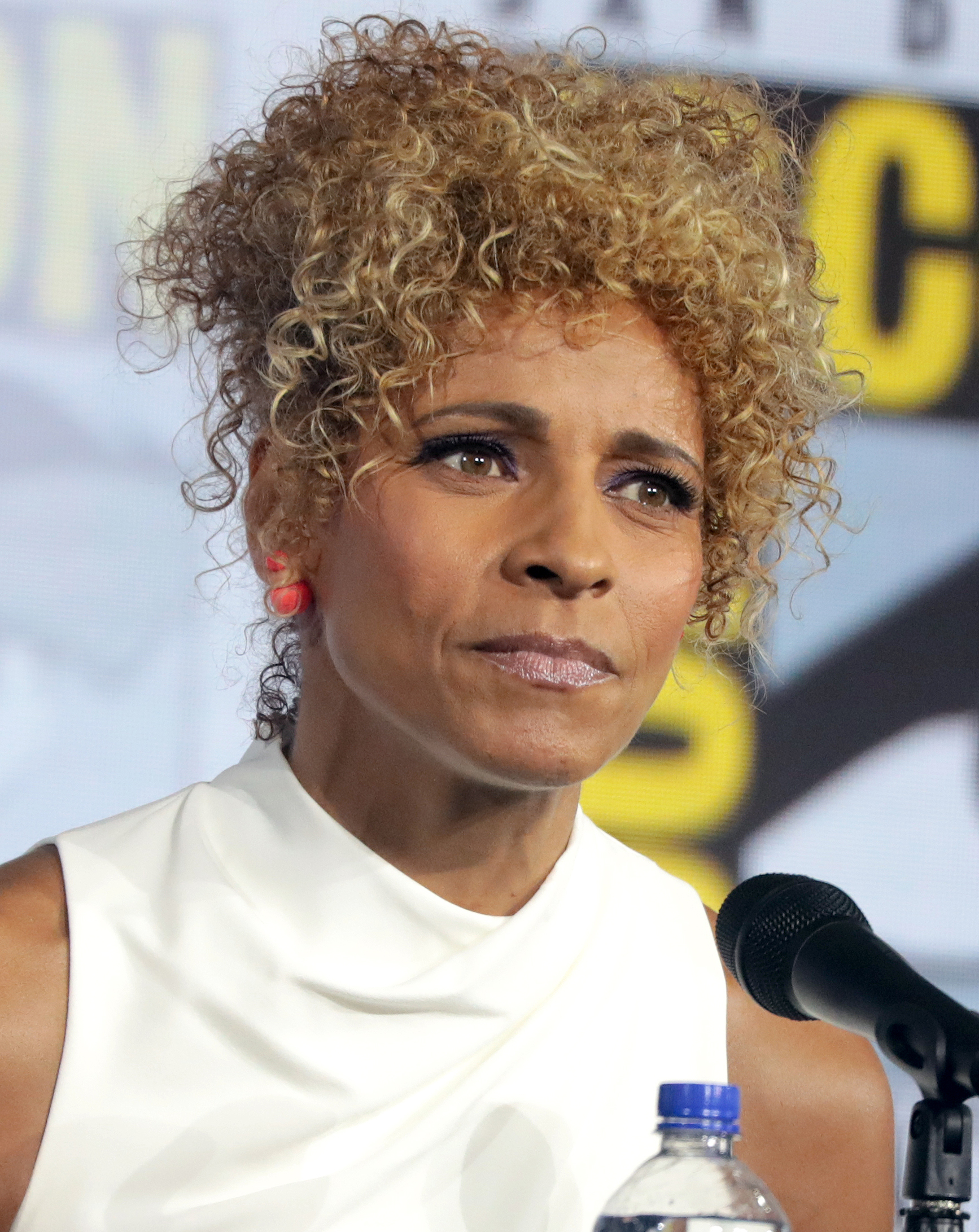
Monique Jeffries was portrayed by actress Michelle Hurd.

I was happy to be working in New York City, I knew what my part was and I was happy to be part of the show. So I didn't moan about it, but after a certain time I started to get frustrated when other people would be brought on and they had things to do.

— Michelle Hurd

Michelle Hurd had appeared on the television series Law & Order, making a guest appearance on the seventh season episode "Entrapment" in 1997. Hurd also previously appeared in the television shows New York Undercover and Players, both of which were produced by Law & Order creator Dick Wolf. When Wolf approached Hurd to play the part of Monique Jeffries, he warned her that the part was small at first but had the potential to develop, telling her, "Think of her as a flower, she'll bloom later, but for the pilot she's just got a scene." The character also had less screen-time than others in the series, in part so that Hurd could accept theater roles. However, Hurd felt the Jeffries character never received the development promised, claiming she "just read instructions" while playing the part. While she liked being part of the cast, Hurd said she was frustrated with the lack of material for her character, particularly when guest stars had more developed roles than Jeffries herself.

When Dean Winters departed from the show and a permanent replacement for the Brian Cassidy character was needed, Hurd had trouble convincing network officials she was correct for the part. Ted Kotcheff, the show's co-executive producer, said it was too redundant to have two man-woman sets of partners, with protagonists Elliot Stabler (Christopher Meloni) and Olivia Benson (Mariska Hargitay) already partnered together. Kotcheff felt Munch and Jeffries‘ pairing diluted the relationship of Stabler and Benson because it was a "mirror image" of their partnership. Although Hurd felt more female characters should be part of a sex crimes unit, she said, "I understand the industry, and what networks want, and they wanted someone to have an impact, a rating." The producers had discussions about removing Jeffries from the show so that Benson would be the only woman in the squad room, but no decisions were ever made.

Hurd ultimately departed from the series during the second season to join the Showtime drama series Leap Years. After her departure from the show, Hurd said, "I think it's just sad they didn't have faith to stick around with me." However, she said she bore no ill feelings about her time on Law & Order: Special Victims Unit, but felt the casting on Leap Years was a "rare opportunity". Roger Friedman, a freelance entertainment gossip blogger for Fox News, wrote that Richard Belzer arranged for Hurd to be fired because her character was receiving too many story-lines and distracting attention from him, but that report was never confirmed. Although Jeffries departed from the Special Victims Unit during the episode "Asunder", her character was still present in the episode "Runaway", which marked the character's final appearance. "Runaway" was originally intended to air before "Asunder" but was broadcast out of order.

== Reception ==
Gail Pennington of the St. Louis Post-Dispatch said of the character, "her role was so marginal that her absence hardly registered" after she departed the series. Ken Parish Perkins of the Fort Worth Star-Telegram called Michelle Hurd a strong member of a "solid cast". The South Florida Sun-Sentinel said the character had "untapped potential" that appeared ready to be tapped after Dean Winters left the show, and the paper expressed disappointment it was never achieved. In an interview with the Orlando Sentinel about the series, New York Police Department Detective Ted Sica said Jeffries' wardrobe was too revealing for a detective, and that the real-life department would not allow her tank tops and tight vests: "We don't tolerate that, especially in a sex crimes unit. We're trying to be a little dignified."
