= Law & Order: Special Victims Unit season 2 =

Season of American television series (2000–2001)

Law & Order: Special Victims Unit
- Season 2
- Season 2 U.S. DVD cover
- Starring: Christopher Meloni; Mariska Hargitay; Richard Belzer; Michelle Hurd; Dann Florek; Stephanie March; Ice-T
- No. of episodes: 21

Release
- Original network: NBC
- Original release: October 20, 2000 – May 11, 2001

Season chronology
- ← Previous; Season 1 Next → Season 3

The second season of the television series Law & Order: Special Victims Unit premiered October 20, 2000, and ended May 11, 2001, on NBC. The show remained in its time slot, Friday nights at 10pm/9c. As Neal Baer's first year producing the show, the second season was accompanied by drastic changes in tone. Additionally, the series began to increase its focus on trial scenes with the addition of an Assistant District Attorney for sex crimes to the cast.

== Production ==
David J. Burke and Neal Baer were chief executive producers, replacing Robert Palm. Baer took over in the season finale. Baer, a former pediatrician, left ER to work for Dick Wolf's first Law & Order spin-off. When explaining how he first became interested in the show, Neal Baer said he was "drawn to it by Mariska", who appeared in ER. Mariska Hargitay felt that Baer gave the show the direction it previously lacked and explained: "There was no consistency. Dick wasn't really here. We had no leader, we had no vision." Jonathan Greene also credited Baer with improving the quality of the show, saying "He literally took this, not just to the next level, but up five or six levels above that." In a video interview, Richard Belzer said "The show's better this year, so I think it's directly attributable to him being at the helm."

The second episode of the season, "Honor," was based on a script that Jonathan Greene had written previously. In it, the squad is exposed to misogynistic "honor killings" used to punish women for adultery. As one reviewer puts it, "Airing one full year before the 9/11 terror attacks, this episode examines Taliban rules and plays differently today than it did when NBC first aired it."

== Cast changes and returning characters ==
First season cast members Christopher Meloni (Detective Elliot Stabler), Mariska Hargitay (Detective Olivia Benson), Richard Belzer (Detective John Munch), and Dann Florek (Captain Don Cragen) returned to the show for the second season. Cast member Michelle Hurd (Detective Monique Jeffries) began to depart the cast over the first half of the season.

Hurd ultimately departed from the series to join the Showtime drama Leap Years. After her departure from the show, Hurd said, "I think it's just sad they didn't have faith to stick around with me." However, she said she bore no ill feelings about her time on Law & Order: Special Victims Unit, but felt the casting on Leap Years was a "rare opportunity." Although Jeffries departed from the Special Victims Unit during the episode "Asunder," her character was still present in the episode "Runaway," which marked the character's final appearance. "Runaway" was originally intended to air before "Asunder" but was broadcast out of order; and thus new scenes were filmed to present the episode as a "flashback". The retcon explanation in "Runaway" is that Detective Jeffries transferred to Vice and briefly stepped into the SVU squad room again when they were in need of extra manpower for a case. Hurd was replaced by rapper-turned-actor Ice-T, who began portraying Detective Odafin "Fin" Tutuola.

Stephanie March joined the cast as Assistant District Attorney Alexandra Cabot. Tamara Tunie took on the recurring role of Medical Examiner Melinda Warner, replacing Leslie Hendrix's Law & Order character Chief Medical Examiner Elizabeth Rodgers. BD Wong began portraying FBI Forensic Psychiatrist Dr. George Huang closer to the end of the season, replacing Dr. Emil Skoda (J. K. Simmons).

== Cast ==
=== Main ===
- Christopher Meloni as Senior Detective Elliot Stabler
- Mariska Hargitay as Junior Detective Olivia Benson
- Richard Belzer as Senior Detective John Munch
- Michelle Hurd as Junior Detective Monique Jeffries (episodes 1, 7 and 16)
- Dann Florek as Captain Donald "Don" Cragen
- Stephanie March as Assistant District Attorney Alexandra Cabot (episodes 2–21, guest episode 1)
- Ice-T as Junior Detective Odafin "Fin" Tutuola (episodes 2–21, uncredited episode 1)

=== Crossover stars from Law & Order ===
- Carolyn McCormick as Dr. Elizabeth Olivet
- J. K. Simmons as Dr. Emil Skoda

=== Recurring ===
- Harvey Atkin as Judge Alan Ridenour
- Leslie Ayvazian as Judge Susan Valdera
- Rob Bartlett as Defense Attorney Milton Schoenfeld
- Doris Belack as Judge Margaret Barry
- Erin Broderick as Maureen Stabler
- Lou Carbonneau as Crime Scene Unit Forensics Technician Harry Martin
- Kent Cassella as Detective Palmieri
- Frank Deal as Defense Attorney Don Newvine
- Jeffrey DeMunn as Chief Assistant District Attorney Charlie Phillips
- Isabel Gillies as Kathy Stabler
- Brian Keane as Dr Peters
- Ron Leibman as Executive Assistant District Attorney Stan Villani
- Joanna Merlin as Judge Lena Petrovsky
- Brian O'Neill as Chief Sullivan
- Kevin O'Rourke as Defense Attorney Sam Tiffany
- Tom O'Rourke as Judge Mark Seligman
- Dylan Price as Detective Danny Tatum
- Lance Reddick as Medical Examiner Dr Taylor
- Scott Sowers as Internal Affairs Bureau Detective Waldman
- Tamara Tunie as Medical Examiner Dr. Melinda Warner
- BD Wong as Dr. George Huang
- Craig Wroe as Defense Attorney James Woodrow

=== Guest stars ===
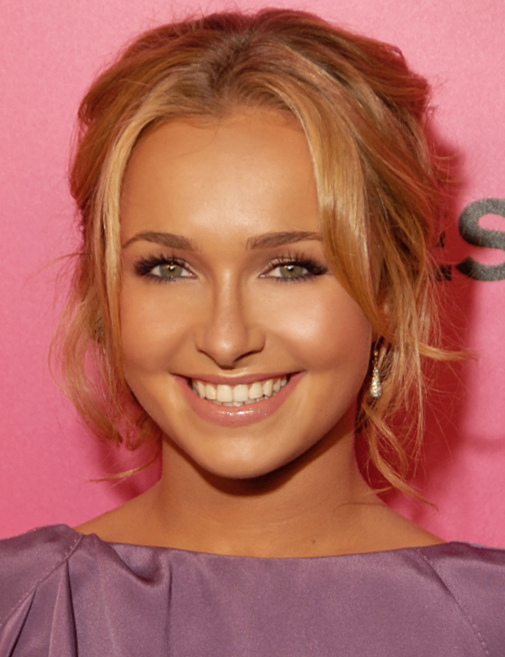
Hayden Panettiere portrayed Ashley Austin Black, a girl who adopted the habit of purposely injuring herself because it was the only way to make her parents notice her.

In the second episode "Honor," Marshall Manesh played an Afghan diplomat and Anil Kumar played his son, both of whom follow Sharia law and condone honor killings. Susham Bedi played the diplomat's wife who, although powerless in her own country, in a climactic scene of the episode gets the chance to make or break a New York case. Tracy Pollan, who played Harper Anderson in Season 1, reprised her role as the paranoid rape victim-turned-vigilante in the Season 2 episode "Closure."

The fifth episode, "Baby Killer," has a tragic opening in which a seven-year-old is shot by one of her classmates, played by Nicolas Martí Salgado. Carlos Leon portrayed a gang leader who played a large role in how Elias came to possess the gun and how he became traumatized enough to fire it. The sixth episode, "Noncompliance," featured Kevin Breznahan played a schizophrenic whose mother (Kathleen Chalfant) and other family, although aware that he is mentally ill, wish him nevertheless to remain off medication because the real world seems to him even more frightening than his delusional one. The seventh episode, "Asunder," in which he played a police officer accused of spousal rape, was the first of two guest appearances SVU for Nestor Serrano. Amy Carlson guest-starred as his wife.

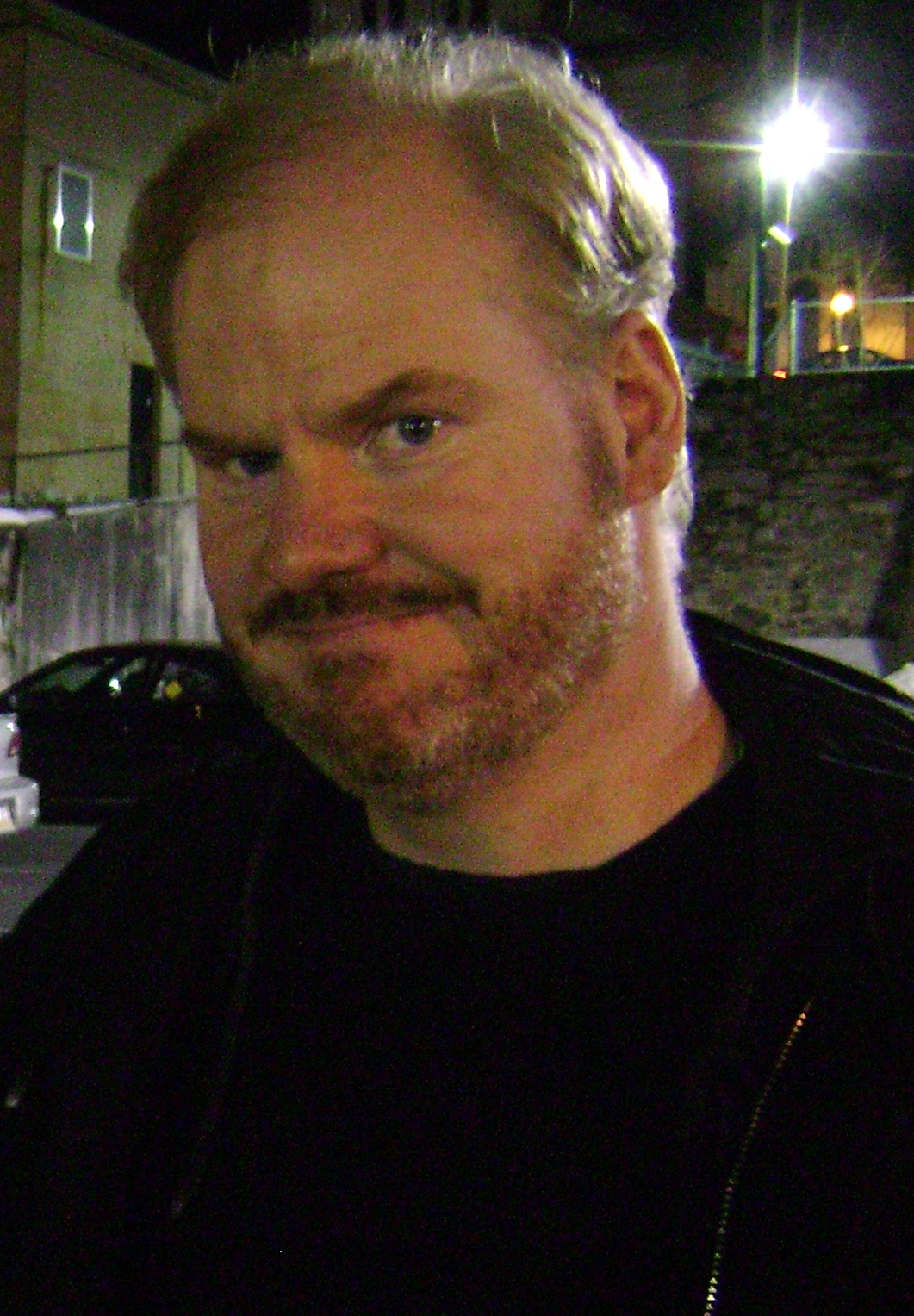
Jim Gaffigan guest starred as Oliver Tunney, a convicted child molester who used to be a party clown.

In the thirteenth episode, "Victims," Eric Roberts guest-starred as a vigilante ex-cop. His character killed sex offenders known to be spreading HIV every time they raped. In this episode, after a visit to a crime scene exposes him to the blood of an HIV-positive victim, Elliot Stabler begins taking antiretrovirals, which is mentioned in the next episode, "Paranoia," in which Khandi Alexander guest-starred as a police officer who secretly works for internal affairs.

In episode fifteen, "Countdown," Andrea Bowen played a key witness who helps the SVU track a serial killer. In the episode "Runaway", Kelly Karbacz played a teenage girl who goes missing. Sean Nelson guest-starred as an informant who helps the SVU search for her. About "Runaway" showrunner Neal Baer said, "That's the only episode ever broadcast just once on the network — because it was stinky." However, the producers still decided to showcase a scene from the episode in the Season 1 DVD extras to help analyze Cragen's character.

In the eighteenth episode, "Manhunt", noted for exploring the partnership between Detectives Munch and Tutuola, R.E. Rodgers and Paul Sparks guest-starred as a serial killing duo. R.E. Rodgers' character is revealed to be the smarter of the two when he murders his partner and escapes to Canada. The second last episode, "Pique", featured Margot Kidder as a woman who sexually abuses her son (Chad Lowe), a disturbed killer whose sexual fetish is piquerism. In an interview with Larry King, Lowe talked about how exciting this role was. Specifically, "if you're playing a serial killer, you can't play them with judgment [sic]. You have to try to get inside their minds. So the further removed it is from your own experience, the more of a challenge it is."

== Episodes ==
Law & Order: Special Victims Unit season 2 episodes
No. overall	No. in season	Title	Directed by	Written by	Original release date	Prod. code	U.S. viewers (millions)
23	1	"Wrong Is Right"	Ted Kotcheff	Jeff Eckerle & David J. Burke	October 20, 2000	E1403	13.39
Stabler's daughter, Maureen (Erin Broderick), bears witness to a horrific crime scene: the murder of a man who was set on fire. The internal investigation into the psyches of the SVU detectives yields interesting results. Monique Jeffries is removed from active duty and placed on desk duty and is replaced by Fin Tutuola. Cabot joins the SVU squad as a permanent Assistant District Attorney for the sex crimes unit.
24	2	"Honor"	Alan Metzger	Jonathan Greene & Robert F. Campbell	October 27, 2000	E1407	13.21
A woman found in the park shows signs of being viciously assaulted. She is identified as Nafeesa Amir, the daughter of Afghan diplomat Saleh Amir (Marshall Manesh). During the investigation, the detectives learn that Nafeesa and her brother Jaleel (Anil Kumar) were raised according to Taliban traditions in which an "honor killing" is the punishment for disobedience. Although her individuality has been suppressed for her entire life, the SVU squad turns to Aziza Amir (Susham Bedi) for help, hoping that the love she feels for her daughter is stronger.
25	3	"Closure: Part 2"	Jean de Segonzac	Story by : Wendy West; Teleplay by : Wendy West, Judith McCreary, & David J. Burke	November 3, 2000	E1409	13.44
Stabler and Benson investigate a sexual assault very similar to one they worked six months ago. They assume that the prime suspect from the previous case (Neil Maffin) is again responsible. Things turn more complicated when they learn that he is being followed and surveilled by his previous victim (Tracy Pollan) who is out for vengeance.: Continued from "Closure: Part 1" in Season 1 Episode 10; Special appearance by Doris Belack as Judge Margaret Barry.
26	4	"Legacy"	Jud Taylor	Jeff Eckerle	November 10, 2000	E1401	13.37
An abused seven-year-old girl lies in a deep coma as the detectives investigate members of her dysfunctional family to determine the source of the abuse. After her mother (Jennifer Dundas Lowe), father (Paul Michael Valley), and brother (Adam Zolotin) lie to protect each other, Munch gets emotional because of a similar case that has haunted him for years.
27	5	"Baby Killer"	Juan J. Campanella	Lisa Marie Petersen & Dawn DeNoon	November 17, 2000	E1411	12.83
The tragic shooting death of a young girl leads investigators to a little boy Elias (Nicolas Martí Salgado). Elliot and Olivia interview him with his parents (Sara Ramirez and Robert Montano) as he is one of the youngest murder suspects they have ever questioned. Meanwhile, Alex argues with her co-workers over what punishment would be ethical. Ballistic evidence reveals that Elias picked up the gun after a gang related murder which he must have witnessed. In addition to providing a mitigating circumstance for Elias' case, this allows the detectives to apprehend a wanted criminal (Carlos Leon).
28	6	"Noncompliance"	Elodie Keene	Judith McCreary	November 24, 2000	E1417	15.32
The question of patients' rights surfaces when a schizophrenic man (Kevin Breznahan) refusing to take his medication is a suspect in the stabbing death of a psychology doctoral student. Against the wishes of his mother (Kathleen Chalfant), the court eventually has him medicated.: This was the first appearance of Tamara Tunie as Doctor Melinda Warner.
29	7	"Asunder"	David Platt	Judith McCreary	December 1, 2000	E1404	15.43
The truth behind the alleged rape of a woman (Amy Carlson) by her police officer husband (Nestor Serrano) comes to light when a history of domestic abuse is uncovered. Monique Jeffries leaves the squad and files a discrimination suit against the NYPD.
30	8	"Taken"	Michael Fields	Dawn DeNoon & Lisa Marie Petersen	December 15, 2000	E1406	14.31
The case of a seventeen-year-old rape victim, Siobhan Miller (Jenna Lamia) during the opening festivities of a luxury family friendly hotel takes a strange turn when her immediate family tries to keep the scandal quiet by preparing a lawsuit. Detectives soon realize that the girl isn't as innocent as she pretends to be, especially when an innocent man, Russell Ramsay (Derek Cecil) gets caught up in her scheme. Benson struggles to deal with her mother's death.
31	9	"Pixies"	Jean de Segonzac	Story by : Clifton Campbell, Jeff Eckerle, & Tracey Stern; Teleplay by : Tracey Stern	January 12, 2001	E1416	14.85
The investigation of a gymnast's murder involves her strict trainer (Philip Casnoff), a wealthy benefactor (Armand Schultz) and a competitor (Kate Mara).
32	10	"Consent"	James Quinn	Jeff Eckerle	January 19, 2001	E1419	13.59
College girl Kelly D'Leah (Tammy Blanchard) is raped during a frat party, but can't remember anything that happened. The detectives find that she had a date rape drug in her system, leaving the squad with many suspects and accomplices. They ultimately discover that the boy who had sex with Kelly (Zak Orth) was unaware that she had been drugged. Elizabeth Hendrickson also guest stars as Mandy Schumacher.
33	11	"Abuse"	Richard Dobbs	Story by : Gwendolyn M. Parker, Lisa Marie Petersen, & Dawn DeNoon; Teleplay by : Dawn DeNoon & Lisa Marie Petersen	January 26, 2001	E1415	15.23
Stabler and Benson suspect parental neglect may have led to the tragic death of the son (Paul Tiesler) of two famous singers including her mother (Christine Andreas), leading them to fear for their little girl Ashley (Hayden Panettiere). Benson realizes that the career-obsessed parents are ignoring Ashley and that her desperate cries for attention have led to a pattern of physical injuries. When Benson pushes the case further, her mother's reaction puts her job in jeopardy.
34	12	"Secrets"	Arthur W. Forney	Story by : Wendy West, Robert F. Campbell, & Jonathan Greene; Teleplay by : Robert F. Campbell & Jonathan Greene	February 2, 2001	E1421	15.72
A case involving the rape and murder of a teacher hits a snag after the woman's sexual addiction is exposed by one of her students.
35	13	"Victims"	Constantine Makris	Nick Kendrick	February 9, 2001	E1420	14.91
A former police officer (Eric Roberts), now a community activist, is a suspect in the murders of known sex offenders, all of whom share a certain characteristic that scars their victims for life. One of them (Rosemarie DeWitt) attempts suicide, leaving Stabler in a potentially life-threatening situation.
36	14	"Paranoia"	Richard Dobbs	Jonathan Greene & Robert F. Campbell	February 16, 2001	E1426	14.11
The rape of a veteran police officer (Khandi Alexander), who trained Benson, is first linked to her ex-husband's gambling debts and then to her fellow officers.
37	15	"Countdown"	Steve Shill	Dawn DeNoon & Lisa Marie Petersen	February 23, 2001	E1412	15.59
The detectives work around the clock to find an abducted girl when clues point to a serial killer (Jonathan Fried) who kills his victims after three days, and follows a very specific pattern: during the three days the man has a "Party Day", a "Picture Day", and finally a "Special Day" on which the victims are raped and murdered. The investigation is assisted by the killer's last victim (Andrea Bowen), who escaped.
38	16	"Runaway"	Richard Dobbs	Nick Kendrick & David J. Burke	March 2, 2001	E1405	14.57
The search for a police officer's runaway daughter (Kelly Karbacz), which leads the detectives through an underground rave culture that caters to wayward teens, is seen through the eyes of the squad room personnel and their interviews with the Internal Affairs division. SVU employs the help of informant Tito Frank (Sean Nelson) and Monique Jeffries who returns in her final appearance to help her former colleagues find the missing girl.: Darrell Hammond guest stars as shady lawyer, Ted Bolger.
39	17	"Folly"	Jud Taylor	Todd Robinson	March 23, 2001	E1428	14.30
The beating of a young man (Eddie Cahill) uncovers a dangerous male escort service where the boss (Patricia Kalember) may have reasons for sending her staff on potentially deadly dates.
40	18	"Manhunt"	Stephen Wertimer	Jeff Eckerle	April 20, 2001	E1431	12.67
When the details of a kidnapping reveal similarities with a series of previous rapes and murders, Munch and Fin find themselves tracking down a serial killer (R.E. Rodgers). The killer proves exceedingly clever when he takes advantage of the trust that his partner (Paul Sparks) has in him and exploits Canadian extradition law.
41	19	"Parasites"	David Platt	Martin Weiss	April 27, 2001	E1427	13.41
When the remains of a young woman are found buried in an apartment courtyard with a collar and leash, Detectives Benson and Stabler determine that the dead woman is Ava Parulis (Mili Avital), a Romanian immigrant who was brought to the United States for an arranged marriage. They discover from Ava's estranged twin, Irina (Mili Avital), that the dead woman had left her abusive husband, and made a habit of taking advantage of wealthy suitors, but the investigation twists when the dental record of the remains uncover the dead woman's real identity.
42	20	"Pique"	Steve Shill	Judith McCreary	May 4, 2001	E1422	14.27
Observed by an FBI psychiatrist, George Huang (BD Wong), the detectives uncover a horrifying motive for the murder of a software company employee by a fired colleague when they learn of the disturbed suspect (Chad Lowe) and his true relationship with his overbearing mother (Margot Kidder).: Special appearance by Doris Belack as Judge Margaret Barry.
43	21	"Scourge"	Alex Zakrzewski	Story by : Neal Baer; Teleplay by : Robert F. Campbell & Jonathan Greene	May 11, 2001	E1432	15.06
The team searches for a serial killer (Richard Thomas) who justifies his crimes with paranoid religious motivation set on by a rapidly deteriorating medical condition. Even though she knows that he has been driven to kill, his wife (Karen Allen) begs the prosecutors to show leniency because of his condition (Neurosyphilis).
