= Law & Order: Special Victims Unit =

American television series (1999–present)

- Also known as: Law & Order: SVU; SVU
- Genre: Police procedural; Crime drama; Legal drama; Mystery; Thriller
- Created by: Dick Wolf
- Showrunners: Robert Palm; David J. Burke; Neal Baer; Warren Leight; Rick Eid; Michael S. Chernuchin; David Graziano; Michele Fazekas
- Starring: Christopher Meloni; Mariska Hargitay; Richard Belzer; Dann Florek; Michelle Hurd; Stephanie March; Ice-T; BD Wong; Diane Neal; Tamara Tunie; Adam Beach; Michaela McManus; Danny Pino; Kelli Giddish; Raúl Esparza; Peter Scanavino; Philip Winchester; Jamie Gray Hyder; Demore Barnes; Octavio Pisano; Molly Burnett; Kevin Kane; Juliana Aidén Martinez; Aimé Donna Kelly; Corey Cott
- Narrated by: Steven Zirnkilton
- Theme music composer: Mike Post
- Opening theme: "Theme of Law & Order: Special Victims Unit"
- Composer: Mike Post
- Country of origin: United States
- Original language: English
- No. of seasons: 28
- No. of episodes: 600 (list of episodes)

Production
- Executive producers: Dick Wolf; Ted Kotcheff; Peter Jankowski; Michael Smith; Julie Martin; Jonathan Starch; Arthur W. Forney; Mariska Hargitay
- Camera setup: Single-camera
- Running time: 40–44 minutes
- Production companies: Wolf Entertainment (Note: Previously credited as Wolf Films for the first 20 seasons); Universal Television (Note: Previously credited as Studios USA Television in seasons 1–3, Universal Network Television in seasons 4–5, NBC Universal Television Studio in seasons 6–9 and Universal Media Studios in seasons 9–13)

Original release
- Network: NBC
- Release: September 20, 1999 – present

Related
- Law & Order franchise

Law & Order: Special Victims Unit (often shortened to Law & Order: SVU or SVU) is an American police procedural crime drama television series created by Dick Wolf for NBC. The first spin-off of Law & Order, expanding it into the Law & Order franchise, it originally starred Christopher Meloni as Detective Elliot Stabler (until Meloni left the series in 2011 after 12 seasons, moving to CBS Studios, formerly known as CBS Television Studios) and Mariska Hargitay as Detective (now promoted to Captain) Olivia Benson remaining the longest starring character in the series. Law & Order: Special Victims Unit follows the detectives of the Special Victims Unit as they investigate and prosecute sex-based crimes. Some of the episodes are loosely based on real crimes that have received media attention.

The series, produced by Wolf Entertainment and Universal Television, premiered on September 20, 1999. The series has received 108 award nominations, winning 59 awards. Hargitay was the first and only regular cast member on any Law & Order series to win an Emmy Award when she won the Primetime Emmy Award for Outstanding Lead Actress in a Drama Series in 2006.

After the premiere of its 21st season in September 2019, the series became the longest-running primetime live-action series on American television. Since the end of the original run of the main Law & Order series in 2010, SVU is the only live-action primetime series having debuted in the 1990s to remain in continuous production. (Note: South Park, which is animated, is the only other scripted comedy/drama show which debuted in the 1990s and has never been out of production since. Other 1990s shows such as Will & Grace and the original Law & Order were revived after being out of production for one or more seasons.) The 23rd season premiered on September 23, 2021, during which the show aired its milestone 500th episode. As of May 14, 2026, Law & Order: Special Victims Unit has aired 594 original episodes, well surpassing the episode count of the original Law & Order series. In terms of all-time episode count for an American primetime scripted series, SVU now ranks third behind The Simpsons (with 808 episodes) and Gunsmoke (with 635 episodes). The 25th season premiered on January 18, 2024, and on March 21, 2024, NBC announced that it had renewed the series for its 26th season, which premiered on October 3, 2024. The 27th season premiered on September 25, 2025. In April 2026, the series was renewed for a 28th season, which premiered on October 8 of the same year.

The two longest-running regular characters in primetime live-action scripted American television history both achieved that record on SVU. Richard Belzer's John Munch character began his 21st consecutive season as a main character, first on Homicide: Life on the Street and then on SVU, in the show's 14th season in fall 2012, breaking the 20-season record held by two cast members of Gunsmoke and remaining through SVU's 15th season before departing as a regular. In fall 2021, Mariska Hargitay began her 23rd season as Olivia Benson, in turn breaking Belzer's record.

== Premise ==
In the criminal justice system, sexually based offenses are considered especially heinous. In New York City, the dedicated detectives who investigate these vicious felonies are members of an elite squad known as the Special Victims Unit. These are their stories.

— Opening narration spoken by Steven Zirnkilton

Based out of the New York City Police Department's 16th precinct in Manhattan, Law & Order: Special Victims Unit delves into the dark side of the New York underworld as the detectives of a new elite squad, the Special Victims Unit (SVU for short), investigate and prosecute various sexually oriented crimes, including rape, child sexual abuse, human trafficking, and domestic violence. They also investigate the abuses of children, the disabled and elderly victims of non-sexual crimes who require specialist handling, all while trying to balance the effects of the investigation on their own lives as they try not to let the dark side of these crimes affect them.

Its stories also touch on the political and societal issues associated with gender identity, sexual preferences, and equality rights. While the victim is often murdered, this is not always the case, and victims frequently play prominent roles in episodes. The unit also works with the Manhattan District Attorney's office as they prosecute cases and seek justice for SVU's victims and survivors with precision and a passion to win and bring closure to the intense investigations. The series often uses stories that are "ripped from the headlines" or based on real crimes. Such episodes take a real crime and fictionalize it by changing some details.

== Episodes ==
Season	Episodes	Originally released		Rank	Rating
Season	Episodes	First released	Last released	Rank	Rating
1	22	September 20, 1999	May 19, 2000	30	8.8
2	21	October 20, 2000	May 11, 2001	25	9.6
3	23	September 28, 2001	May 17, 2002	12	10.4
4	25	September 27, 2002	May 16, 2003	14	10.1
5	25	September 23, 2003	May 18, 2004	18	8.7
6	23	September 21, 2004	May 24, 2005	16	9.2
7	22	September 20, 2005	May 16, 2006	18	9.2
8	22	September 19, 2006	May 22, 2007	24	7.9
9	19	September 25, 2007	May 13, 2008	22	7.6
10	22	September 23, 2008	June 2, 2009	26	6.7
11	24	September 23, 2009	May 19, 2010	—N/a	—N/a
12	24	September 22, 2010	May 18, 2011	—N/a	—N/a
13	23	September 21, 2011	May 23, 2012	—N/a	—N/a
14	24	September 26, 2012	May 22, 2013	—N/a	—N/a
15	24	September 25, 2013	May 21, 2014	—N/a	—N/a
16	23	September 24, 2014	May 20, 2015	—N/a	—N/a
17	23	September 23, 2015	May 25, 2016	—N/a	—N/a
18	21	September 21, 2016	May 24, 2017	—N/a	—N/a
19	24	September 27, 2017	May 23, 2018	30	5.6
20	24	September 27, 2018	May 16, 2019	—N/a	—N/a
21	20	September 26, 2019	April 23, 2020	—N/a	—N/a
22	16	November 12, 2020	June 3, 2021	36	5.9
23	22	September 23, 2021	May 19, 2022	40	6.3
24	22	September 22, 2022	May 18, 2023	TBA	TBA
25	13	January 18, 2024	May 16, 2024	TBA	TBA
26	22	October 3, 2024	May 15, 2025	47	8.7
27	21	September 25, 2025	May 14, 2026	39	8.7
28	TBA	October 8, 2026	TBA	TBA	TBA

== Cast and characters ==
Portrayed by	Character	Position	Seasons																											
Portrayed by	Character	Position	1	2	3	4	5	6	7	8	9	10	11	12	13	14	15	16	17	18	19	20	21	22	23	24	25	26	27	28
Christopher Meloni	Elliot Stabler	Sr. Detective (S1–12)	Main	Main	Main	Main	Main	Main	Main	Main	Main	Main	Main	Main										Recurring	Recurring	Recurring	Guest	Guest	Guest	Guest
Mariska Hargitay	Olivia Benson	Jr. Detective (S1–12); Sr. Detective (S13–15); Sergeant (S15–17); Lieutenant (S17–21); Captain (S21–)	Main	Main	Main	Main	Main	Main	Main	Main	Main	Main	Main	Main	Main	Main	Main	Main	Main	Main	Main	Main	Main	Main	Main	Main	Main	Main	Main	Main
Richard Belzer	John Munch	Sr. Detective (S1–8); Sergeant (S9–15)	Main	Main	Main	Main	Main	Main	Main	Main	Main	Main	Main	Main	Main	Main	Main		G											
Dann Florek	Donald Cragen	Captain (S1–15)	Main	Main	Main	Main	Main	Main	Main	Main	Main	Main	Main	Main	Main	Main	Main	G							G				G	
Michelle Hurd	Monique Jeffries	Jr. Detective	M	M																										
Stephanie March	Alexandra Cabot	Assistant DA		Main	Main	Main	Main	G				R	M		R						G									
Ice-T	Fin Tutuola	Jr. Detective (S2–8); Sr. Detective (S9–19); Sergeant (S19–)		Main	Main	Main	Main	Main	Main	Main	Main	Main	Main	Main	Main	Main	Main	Main	Main	Main	Main	Main	Main	Main	Main	Main	Main	Main	Main	Main
BD Wong	George Huang	Psychiatrist (S2–15)		R	R	Main	Main	Main	Main	Main	Main	Main	Main	Main	Guest	Guest	Guest		G										G	
Diane Neal	Casey Novak	Assistant DA					Main	Main	Main	Main	Main			G	R															
Tamara Tunie	Melinda Warner	Chief Medical Examiner		Recurring	Recurring	Recurring	Recurring	Recurring	Main	Main	Main	Main	Main	Main	Recurring	Recurring	Recurring	Recurring	Recurring		G		Guest	Guest	Guest					
Adam Beach	Chester Lake	Jr. Detective								R	M																			
Michaela McManus	Kim Greylek	Assistant DA										M																		
Danny Pino	Nick Amaro	Jr. Detective													Main	Main	Main	Main							G					
Kelli Giddish	Amanda Rollins	Jr. Detective (S13–21); Sr. Detective (S21–24); Sergeant (S26-)													Main	Main	Main	Main	Main	Main	Main	Main	Main	Main	Main	Main	G	R	M	M
Raúl Esparza	Rafael Barba	Assistant DA (S14–19); Defense Attorney (S21–23)														R	Main	Main	Main	Main	Main		Guest	Guest	Guest					
Peter Scanavino	Dominick Carisi	Jr. Detective (S16–20); Assistant DA (S21–)																Main	Main	Main	Main	Main	Main	Main	Main	Main	Main	Main	Main	Main
Philip Winchester	Peter Stone	Assistant DA																			M	M								
Jamie Gray Hyder	Katriona Tamin	Officer (S21–22); Jr. Detective (S22–23)																					Main	Main	Main					
Demore Barnes	Christian Garland	Deputy Chief																					R	M	M					
Octavio Pisano	Joe Velasco	Jr. Detective (S23–26); Sr. Detective (S26–27)																							Main	Main	Main	Main	Main	
Molly Burnett	Grace Muncy	Jr. Detective																								M				
Kevin Kane	Terry Bruno	Jr. Detective																								R	R	Main	Main	Main
Juliana Aidén Martinez	Kate Silva	Jr. Detective																										M		
Aimé Donna Kelly	Renee Curry	Captain																						G	G		R	R	M	M
Corey Cott	Jake Griffin	Jr. Detective																											M	M

== Production ==
=== Development ===
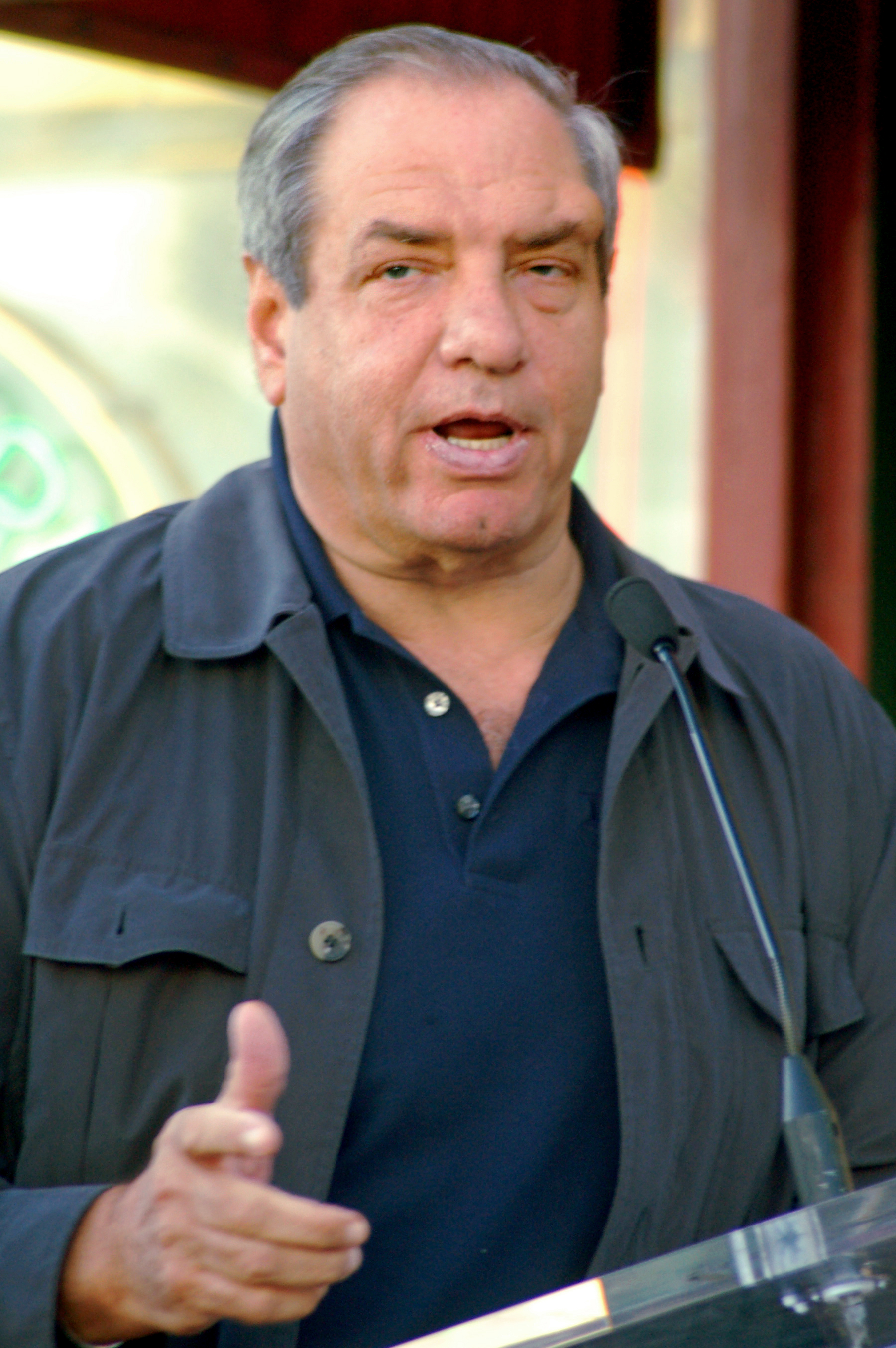
Dick Wolf (pictured in 2010), the creator and executive producer of Law & Order: Special Victims Unit

The idea for Law & Order: Special Victims Unit originated with the 1986 "preppie murder" case of Robert Chambers, who strangled and killed a woman he dated, Jennifer Levin, during what he claimed was consensual "rough sex" in Manhattan's Central Park. The crime inspired Dick Wolf to write the story for the season one episode of Law & Order titled "Kiss the Girls and Make Them Die". After writing the episode, Wolf wanted to go deeper into the psychology of crimes to examine the role of human sexuality.

The original title of the show was Sex Crimes. Initially, there was concern among the producers that, should Sex Crimes fail, identifying the new show with the Law & Order franchise could affect the original show. Additionally, Ted Kotcheff wanted to create a new series that was not dependent upon the original series for success. Wolf felt, however, that it was important and commercially desirable to have "Law & Order" in the title, and he initially proposed the title of the show be Law & Order: Sex Crimes. Barry Diller, then head of Studios USA, was concerned about the title, however, and it was changed to Law & Order: Special Victims Unit to reflect the actual unit of the New York City Police Department (NYPD) that handles sexually based offenses.

Executive producer Neal Baer left Law & Order: SVU as showrunner at the end of season twelve, after eleven years (seasons 2–12) on the show, in order to sign a three-year deal with CBS Television Studios. Baer was replaced by former Law & Order: Criminal Intent showrunner Warren Leight. In March 2015, it was announced that Warren Leight signed a three-year deal with Sony Pictures Television, that will allow him to work on SVU one more season, its seventeenth. It was announced on March 10, 2016, that original Law & Order veteran producer Rick Eid would take Leight's place as showrunner starting in season 18. Creator Dick Wolf commented to The Hollywood Reporter, "I'm extremely pleased that Rick had decided to rejoin the family and hope that he will be here for years to come." During post-production of season 18, following the announcement that SVU was renewed for a nineteenth season, it was revealed that Rick Eid departed the series. He will be taking over another Dick Wolf/NBC series, Chicago P.D.

It was announced on May 25, 2017, that original Law & Order and Law & Order: Criminal Intent showrunner Michael S. Chernuchin would be reprising his role starting on season nineteen. Chernuchin was also co-creator and executive producing showrunner of Chicago Justice, another Wolf-related show that was canceled by NBC at the end of the 2016–17 TV season. On April 22, 2019, it was announced that Leight would return as showrunner for the series' twenty-first season. On May 3, 2022, Leight announced that he would not be returning for the twenty-fourth season.

In May 2025, NBC renewed the series for its twenty-seventh season; Michele Fazekas assumed the role of showrunner, becoming the first woman to serve in the position for Special Victims Unit. In April 2026, NBC renewed the series for its twenty-eighth season. Fazekas is expected to return as showrunner.

=== Casting ===
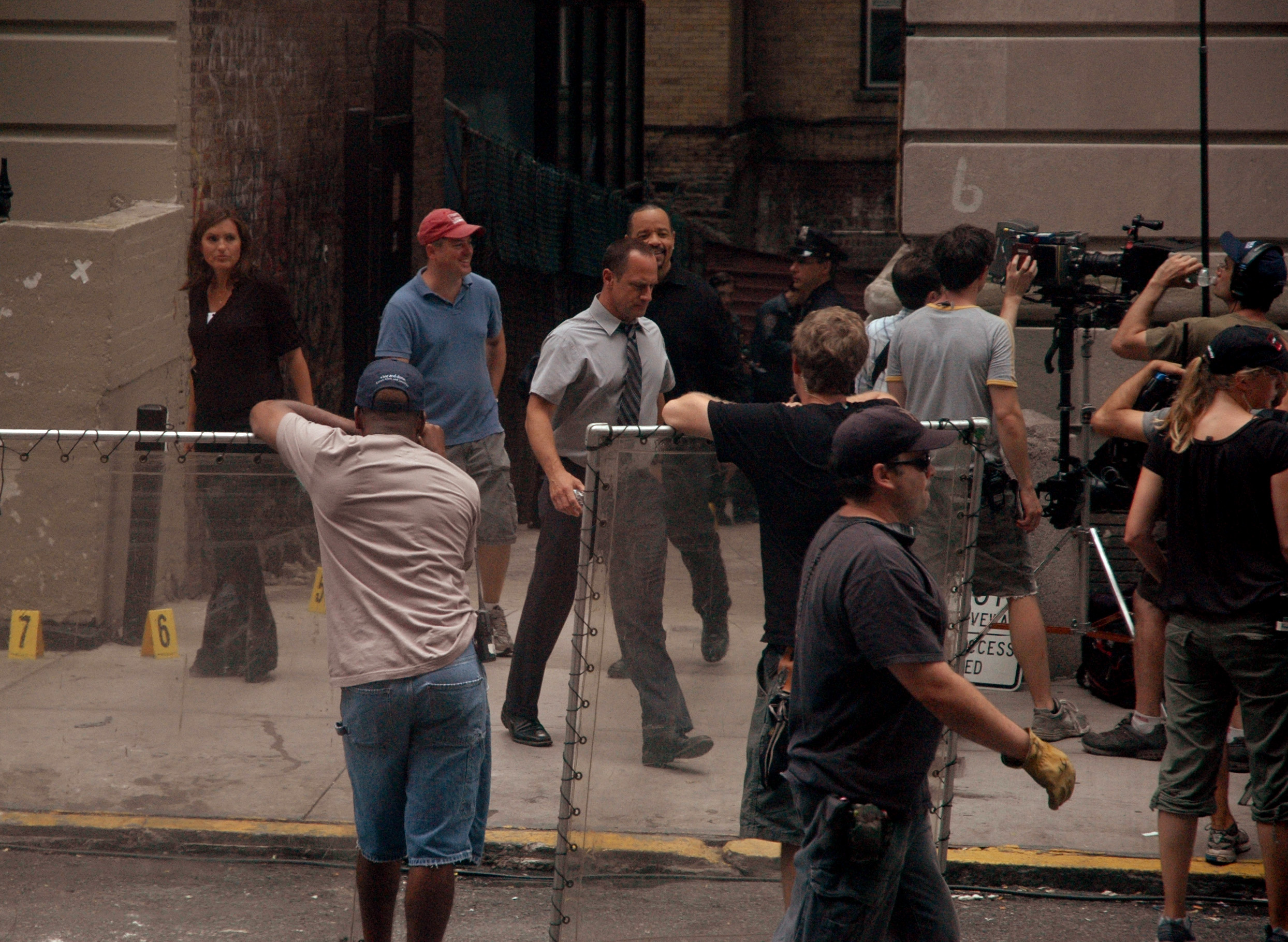
Mariska Hargitay, Christopher Meloni and Ice-T during filming of the 12th season

Casting for the lead characters of Law & Order: Special Victims Unit occurred in the spring of 1999. Dick Wolf, along with officials from NBC and Studios USA were at the final auditions for the two leads at Rockefeller Center. The last round had been narrowed down to seven finalists. For the female lead, Detective Olivia Benson, actresses Samantha Mathis, Reiko Aylesworth, and Mariska Hargitay were being considered. For the male role, Detective Elliot Stabler, the finalists were Tim Matheson, John Slattery, Nick Chinlund, and Christopher Meloni. Hargitay and Meloni had auditioned in the final round together and, after the actors left, there was a moment of dead silence, after which Wolf blurted out, "Oh well. There's no doubt whom we should choose—Hargitay and Meloni." Wolf believed the duo had the perfect chemistry together from the first time he saw them together, and they ended up being his first choice. Garth Ancier, then head of NBC Entertainment, agreed, and the rest of the panel assembled began voicing their assent.

The first actor to be cast for the show was Dann Florek. Florek had originated the character of Captain Don Cragen in the 1990 pilot for Law & Order, and played the character for the show's first three seasons until he was fired on the orders of network executives, who wanted to add female characters to the all-male primary cast, but he maintained a friendly relationship with Wolf, and went on to direct three episodes of the original series as well as to occasionally guest star on the show. Shortly after Florek reprised his role for Exiled: A Law & Order Movie, he received a call to be on Sex Crimes. Initially reluctant, he eventually agreed to star on the show as Cragen on the assurance that he would not be asked to audition for the role.

Shortly after the cancellation of Homicide: Life on the Street, Richard Belzer heard that Benjamin Bratt had left Law & Order. Belzer requested his manager to call Wolf and pitch the idea for Belzer's character from Homicide, Detective John Munch, to become the new partner of Jerry Orbach's character, Detective Lennie Briscoe, since they had previously teamed in three Homicide crossovers. Wolf loved the idea, but had already cast Jesse L. Martin as Briscoe's new partner, Detective Ed Green. The idea was reconfigured, but to have Munch on Law & Order: Special Victims Unit instead. Since the character of Munch was inspired by David Simon's depiction of Detective Sergeant Jay Landsman and developed for Homicide by Tom Fontana and Barry Levinson, the addition of Munch to the cast required the consent of all three. The appropriate agreements were reached and, while Fontana and Levinson agreed to waive their royalty rights, contracts with Simon required that he be paid royalties for any new show in which Munch is a main character; as a result, Simon receives royalties every time Munch appears in an episode of the show.

Dean Winters was cast as Munch's partner, Brian Cassidy, at the insistence of Belzer. Belzer looked at Winters as a sort of little brother, and told Wolf, "Well, I'll do this new show of yours, SVU, only if you make Dean Winters my partner." Wolf did make Winters Belzer's partner, but he was contractually obligated to his other show at the time, the HBO drama Oz. Since the role on Law & Order: Special Victims Unit was only initially meant to be a few episodes, Winters was forced to leave when it was time to film Oz again. Winters returned for the season 13 finale, "Rhodium Nights", reprising his role as Cassidy. He also appeared (as Cassidy) on the two-part season 14 premiere "Lost Reputation"/"Above Suspicion". He subsequently became a recurring character into season 15. The void left by Winters's departure was filled for the remainder of the season by Michelle Hurd as Detective Monique Jeffries, a character who Wolf promised that, despite starting out as a minor character with one scene in the pilot, would eventually develop. Hurd left the show at the beginning of season two to join the cast of Leap Years. Munch's permanent partner came in the form of rapper-turned-actor Ice-T, who had previously worked with Wolf on New York Undercover and Exiled. Ice-T originally agreed to do only four episodes of Law & Order: Special Victims Unit, but he quickly gained affection for the ensemble nature of the cast. He relocated to New York City before his four-episode contract was up and remained with the show as Munch's permanent partner, Detective Odafin "Fin" Tutuola.

Initially, the show focused exclusively on the police work of the detectives in the Special Victims Unit of the 16th precinct, with members of the District Attorney's office occasionally appearing as guest roles crossing over from the original Law & Order. From season two onwards, the format was changed to be more faithful to the original Law & Order concept by including court cases. Stephanie March had little television experience before being cast on Law & Order: Special Victims Unit, nor did she watch much TV. Nevertheless, March was cast as Assistant District Attorney Alexandra Cabot at the beginning of season two but still believed that, due to the grim nature of the series, it would be short-lived. She stayed with the series for three seasons, however, and left when she believed she had reached the natural conclusion of the character's development. She would later reprise the character as a guest appearance in season six and as a regular character on the short-lived Wolf series, Conviction, where she was promised more to do. Diane Neal had previously guest-starred on Law & Order: Special Victims Unit in season three before being cast as Cabot's replacement, Casey Novak, in season five. Neal remained with the show through the end of season nine, after which she was replaced by Michaela McManus. March returned to the show in the tenth season (after McManus' departure from the cast) when Neal Baer proposed Cabot receive a character arc to revitalize the second part of the season, which would continue through season eleven.

Tamara Tunie was cast as medical examiner Melinda Warner in season two after working with Wolf previously on New York Undercover, Feds, and Law & Order. Warner was initially a recurring character but became a regular character in season seven, and Tunie was added to the opening credits at that time. When initially cast as Warner, Tunie was appearing as attorney Jessica Griffin on the CBS daytime soap opera As the World Turns. From 2000 to 2007 (and again briefly in 2009), she appeared on both series simultaneously. In 2002, she also appeared on the Fox espionage-themed drama series 24, in the recurring role of CTU Acting Director Alberta Green. BD Wong was asked to film four episodes as Dr. George Huang, a Federal Bureau of Investigation (FBI) forensic psychiatrist and criminal profiler on loan to the Special Victims Unit. After his four episodes, he was asked to stay on with the show.

After he starred in Bury My Heart at Wounded Knee and guest-starred as Detective Chester Lake in the eighth season, Wolf felt that Adam Beach would be a good addition to the cast and asked him to be a permanent member beginning with the ninth season. Although Beach felt the role was a "dream role", the character proved unpopular with fans who felt that he was designed to gradually write out either Richard Belzer or Ice-T. Feeling there were too many police characters on the show, Beach left the show after only one season. Michaela McManus was originally felt to be too young for the role of an Assistant District Attorney (ADA) before being cast as ADA Kim Greylek in the tenth season. McManus, months removed from a recurring role on One Tree Hill, remained with the series only half a season, however, before departing for unspecified reasons.

Paula Patton joined the cast as ADA Mikka Von. She replaced Stephanie March. However, Patton dropped out after one episode to film Mission: Impossible – Ghost Protocol, and was replaced by Melissa Sagemiller in the recurring role of ADA Gillian Hardwicke.

Before the end of season twelve, Mariska Hargitay asked for a lighter workload. As a way of writing her out of certain episodes, a plan to have her character promoted to a supervisory role was discussed. At the end of season twelve, Christopher Meloni departed the cast, unable to reach agreement on a new contract. Warren Leight became the new showrunner during this same year and signed on before he knew that Meloni would be leaving the cast. The second major departure to be announced in 2011 was that of BD Wong. On July 17, Wong announced on Twitter that, "I actually do not return for season 13, I am jumping to Awake! It's awesome!" Wong added, "I don't know if or when I'll be back on SVU! It was amazing to have such a cool job for 11 years and to be a real NY Actor." Wong reprised his role as Dr. Huang in season 13's episode "Father Dearest".

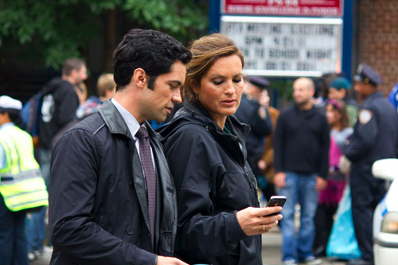
Danny Pino and Hargitay during the filming of the 13th season

In June 2011, it was announced that Kelli Giddish and Danny Pino would join the cast as new series regulars. Weeks later, it was announced that Stephanie March and Diane Neal would be reprising their roles as ADA Alexandra Cabot and ADA Casey Novak, respectively. The launch of season 13 was marked with a retooling of the show that Warren Leight referred to as "SVU 2.0". Changes that accompanied this included Tamara Tunie's being bumped from the main cast to a guest-starring role and recurring actor Joel de la Fuente's not appearing for the first time since 2002. Of the latter change, Warren Leight said, "those scenes [which featured Fuente] can be dry" and hired Gilbert Gottfried as a more comedic replacement.

In season 14, Raúl Esparza joined the cast in a recurring capacity as ADA Rafael Barba and prior to the season 15 premiere, Esparza was promoted to a series regular. Also in season 15, Belzer departed the cast in the fifth episode, "Wonderland Story", in which Sgt. Munch retired from the NYPD and took a job in the DA's office as an investigator. Later in the season, Captain Cragen announced his departure from the NYPD, which made newly promoted Sgt. Benson the temporary squad commander. In leaving the cast, Florek ended a 400-episode run as Captain Cragen. In season 16, Peter Scanavino joined the series, first in a recurring role for episodes 1–3 and then was promoted to the main cast in episode 5, with Kelli Giddish, Danny Pino, Ice-T and Raúl Esparza. On May 20, 2015, it was revealed that Danny Pino would be leaving the cast after the season 16 finale "Surrendering Noah".

In August 2017, it was announced that Philip Winchester would recur in season 19 as ADA Peter Stone, his character from Chicago P.D. and Chicago Justice, who is the son of Benjamin Stone, the first ADA on the original Law & Order series. It was later also announced that Brooke Shields was enlisted to assume a major recurring role (Sheila Porter, maternal grandmother of Noah Porter-Benson, Olivia's adopted son) starting in season 19 of the long-running dramatic series. On February 7, 2018, Raúl Esparza left the series after six seasons. His role was taken over by Winchester. Upon being renewed for its twenty-first season, it was announced that Winchester would be departing the series after the twentieth season.

In March 2019, it was announced that the show would come back for season 21, making it the longest-running primetime American live-action series in the history of television. On March 29, 2019, it was revealed that Winchester would not return for season 21. He tweeted the same day about his departure from the show. On May 16, 2019, the season finale aired and Winchester took to Twitter to thank the cast and crew for the send-off. After recurring for several episodes in season 21 as Vice Officer Katriona Tamin, Jamie Gray Hyder joined the cast as a regular, starting in episode 8. On October 6, 2020, Demore Barnes, who had recurred throughout season 21 as new Deputy Chief Christian Garland, was upgraded to regular status for season 22. On September 3, 2021, it was announced that Hyder and Barnes would both depart the series following the two-hour season 23 premiere. On October 13, 2021, Octavio Pisano, who had guest starred since the start of the season, was promoted to regular status. On August 24, 2022, it was announced that Giddish would leave the series during the first half of season 24, with episode nine as her last appearance as a regular. On November 10, 2022, Molly Burnett, who initially appeared in a recurring capacity for the first six episodes, was promoted to series regular beginning with the seventh episode. On May 19, 2023, Burnett announced that she will leave at the end of the show's twenty-fourth season. On November 28, 2023, it was announced Giddish would return for the twenty-fifth-season premiere. On July 22, 2024, it was reported Kevin Kane, who portrays Terry Bruno, would be promoted to a series regular for the show's twenty-sixth season, after recurring the previous two seasons. On August 7, 2024, it was announced Juliana Aidén Martinez, who would portray Kate Silva, was added as a series regular ahead of the season premiere.

On May 6, 2025, it was announced Martinez and Pisano would depart following the conclusion of the twenty-sixth season. Nine days later, it was announced Giddish would return as a series regular for the twenty-seventh season. On July 18, 2025, it was announced Aimé Donna Kelly, who joined the series in the recurring role of Captain Renee Curry in 2020, had been upgraded to series regular ahead of the twenty-seventh season. Six days later, it was revealed Pisano would reprise his role for the season twenty-seven premiere. In August, it was announced Meloni, Florek, and Wong would reprise their roles of Stabler, Donald Cragen, and George Huang, respectively during the season. Corey Cott joined the series as Detective Jake Griffin starting with the second episode of season twenty-seventh, later being promoted to a series regular in the ninth episode. Hargitay, Ice T, Scanavino, Giddish, Kane, and Kelly are all expected to return for the series' 28th season. In September 2026, it was announced Meloni would reprise his role as Elliott Stabler during the series' 600th episode.

==== Salaries ====
By season twelve, both Mariska Hargitay and Christopher Meloni had become among the highest-paid lead actors on a drama, with each earning nearly $400,000 per episode, a salary that TV Guide said was exceeded only by House's Hugh Laurie. During season sixteen, Hargitay was reported to be earning $450,000 per episode, or $10,350,000 per season. In season seventeen, her salary increased to $500,000 per episode.

=== Filming and location ===
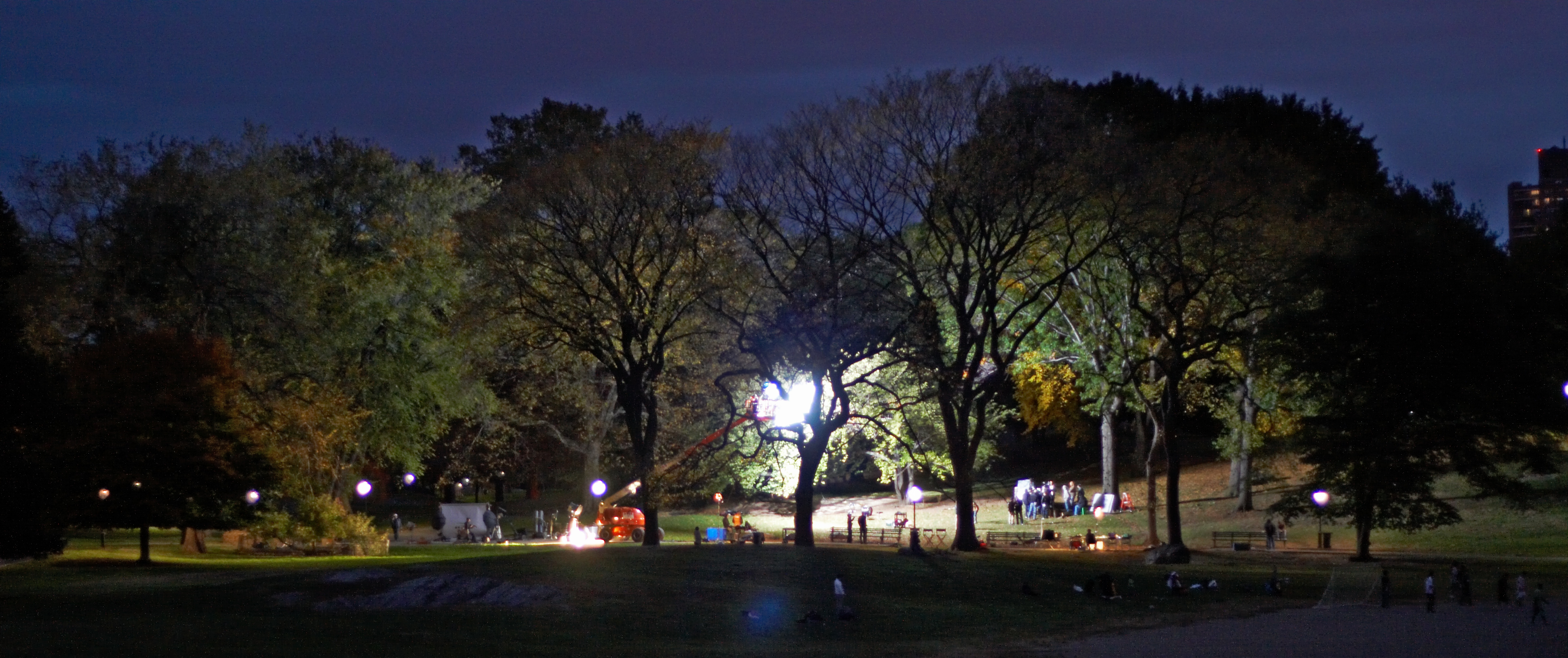
SVU shooting on location in Central Park at night

Many exterior scenes of Law & Order: Special Victims Unit are filmed on location in New York City, Wolf's hometown, throughout all five of New York City's boroughs. Fort Lee, New Jersey served as the filming location for Detective Elliot Stabler's residence in Queens, New York.

When searching for a place to film the interiors of the show, the producers found that there were no suitable studio spaces available in New York City. As a result, a space was chosen at NBC's Central Archives building in nearby North Bergen, New Jersey, 53,000 square feet (4,900 m^{2}) of stage area that had been left unused for some time. The Archives building was used for police station and courtroom scenes, with various other locations in Hudson County used for other scenes, such as a scene shot at the Meadowlands Parkway in Secaucus in 2010. The production left New Jersey for New York in 2010, however, when New Jersey Governor Chris Christie suspended the tax credits for film and television production for the Fiscal Year 2011 to close budget gaps. The show moved into the studio space at Chelsea Piers that had been occupied by the original Law & Order series until its cancellation in May 2010. In 2023, filming near the courthouses at Foley Square coincided with media attention on the trial related to the prosecution of Donald Trump in New York. During external filming in Fort Tryon Park in 2024, it was reported that a young girl looking for her mother mistook Mariska Hargitay for a real police officer.

== Release ==
=== Broadcast ===
Law & Order: SVU airs on NBC in the United States. With the season eleven premiere on September 23, 2009, the series vacated its Tuesday 10 p.m. ET slot as NBC began a nightly prime-time series hosted by Jay Leno. The new time slot became Wednesday nights at 9:00 p.m. ET on NBC, with CTV still airing SVU on Tuesdays at 10:00 in Canada. After the 2010 Winter Olympics on March 3, 2010, the time slot again changed to Wednesdays at 10 p.m. ET, where it stayed until the twelfth season. For the 12th season, SVU moved back to 9:00 p.m. to lead in the newest Law & Order spin-off, Law & Order: LA, until it was pulled from the network in January 2011 to be retooled. SVU moved back to 10:00 p.m. on January 12, 2011, until the end of the 13th season. With season 14, SVU moved back to 9:00 p.m. after a two-hour season premiere event on September 26, 2012. Beginning with Season 20, SVU would air on Thursday nights at 10 p.m., after NBC decided to devote their entire Wednesday primetime lineup to the Chicago Med, PD, and Fire trilogy. It marked the first time ever that Law & Order: SVU would hold this timeslot on Thursday nights. Starting with season 22, SVU moved to 9 p.m., with offshoot Law & Order: Organized Crime taking its old slot.

From season 21, Law & Order: Special Victims Unit airs on Sky Witness in the United Kingdom. Beginning from season 23, it moved from CTV to CityTV in Canada, simulcasting with NBC. Law & Order: Special Victims Unit airs on Rock Entertainment in Southeast Asia.

=== Streaming ===
Peacock contains seasons 1–6 and 19–27th while Hulu currently has all seasons (1–26) available. The latest 5 episodes can be watched for free on NBC.com and the NBC app. Outside of SVOD and NBC platforms, most episodes (outside of seasons 2–4 in the United States for unknown reasons) can be found on electronic sell-through platforms such as iTunes and Amazon Prime Video. The series is available for streaming on Peacock along with Chicago Fire, Chicago P.D., Chicago Med, Law & Order and Law & Order: Criminal Intent. Seasons 1–22 are available for streaming in Australia on Amazon Prime Video. In Brazil, seasons 11 to 13 are available on Amazon Prime Video, and seasons 1–22 are available on Globoplay, although seasons 15–22 require a subscription expansion or cable access to UniversalTV. In 2024, selected seasons returned to Netflix in certain regions including the UK, Europe, Africa, Australia, New Zealand, and Latin America.

=== Syndication ===
As of May 2026, the series is rerun on fellow NBCUniversal network USA, as well as on Ion Television and MyNetworkTV stations. The series also briefly ran on Syfy in 2006. In 2008, Fox obtained rights to air Law & Order: SVU on Fox-owned TV stations, and began doing so in the fall of 2009.

== Reception ==
=== Ratings ===
Viewership and ratings per season of Law & Order: Special Victims Unit
Season	Timeslot (ET)	Episodes	First aired		Last aired		TV season	Viewership rank	Avg. viewers (millions)
Season	Timeslot (ET)	Episodes	Date	Viewers (millions)	Date	Viewers (millions)	TV season	Viewership rank	Avg. viewers (millions)
1	Monday 9:00 p.m. (ep. 1–9); Friday 10:00 p.m. (ep. 10–22)	22	September 20, 1999	14.13	May 19, 2000	12.16	1999–2000	33	12.18
2	Friday 10:00 p.m.	21	October 20, 2000	13.39	May 11, 2001	15.06	2000–01	29	13.10
3	Friday 10:00 p.m.	23	September 28, 2001	15.79	May 17, 2002	14.27	2001–02	14	15.2
4	Friday 10:00 p.m.	25	September 27, 2002	14.88	May 16, 2003	13.72	2002–03	16	14.83
5	Tuesday 10:00 p.m.	25	September 23, 2003	13.23	May 18, 2004	18.36	2003–04	21	12.72
6	Tuesday 10:00 p.m.	23	September 21, 2004	14.20	May 24, 2005	16.38	2004–05	23	13.46
7	Tuesday 10:00 p.m.	22	September 20, 2005	15.32	May 16, 2006	12.97	2005–06	24	13.78
8	Tuesday 10:00 p.m.	22	September 19, 2006	14.55	May 22, 2007	10.28	2006–07	38	11.94
9	Tuesday 10:00 p.m.	19	September 25, 2007	12.12	May 13, 2008	11.50	2007–08	30	11.33
10	Tuesday 10:00 p.m.	22	September 23, 2008	9.68	June 2, 2009	11.56	2008–09	39	10.11
11	Wednesday 9:00 p.m.	24	September 23, 2009	8.36	May 19, 2010	8.79	2009–10	44	8.81
12	Wednesday 9:00 p.m.	24	September 22, 2010	9.68	May 18, 2011	8.98	2010–11	47	8.84
13	Wednesday 10:00 p.m.	23	September 21, 2011	7.63	May 23, 2012	7.16	2011–12	67	7.59
14	Wednesday 9:00 p.m.	24	September 26, 2012	7.19	May 22, 2013	6.66	2012–13	56	7.30
15	Wednesday 9:00 p.m.	24	September 25, 2013	9.58	May 21, 2014	6.39	2013–14	46	8.18
16	Wednesday 9:00 p.m.	23	September 24, 2014	10.07	May 20, 2015	6.96	2014–15	52	8.71
17	Wednesday 9:00 p.m.	23	September 23, 2015	8.27	May 25, 2016	7.19	2015–16	52	8.31
18	Wednesday 9:00 p.m.	21	September 21, 2016	7.83	May 24, 2017	6.22	2016–17	48	7.39
19	Wednesday 9:00 p.m.	24	September 27, 2017	5.67	May 23, 2018	6.12	2017–18	39	8.57
20	Thursday 10:00 p.m.	24	September 27, 2018	5.09	May 16, 2019	3.58	2018–19	51	7.41
21	Thursday 10:00 p.m.	20	September 26, 2019	3.84	April 23, 2020	3.69	2019–20	55	6.46
22	Thursday 9:00 p.m.	16	November 12, 2020	3.02	June 3, 2021	4.23	2020–21	34	6.78
23	Thursday 9:00 p.m.	22	September 23, 2021	5.57	May 19, 2022	4.52	2021–22	29	6.83
24	Thursday 9:00 p.m.	22	September 22, 2022	5.47	May 18, 2023	4.37	2022–23	21	6.89
25	Thursday 9:00 p.m.	13	January 18, 2024	5.66	May 16, 2024	4.14	2023–24	20	6.86
26	Thursday 9:00 p.m.	22	October 3, 2024	3.81	May 15, 2025	3.99	2024–25	21	8.70
27	Thursday 9:00 p.m.	21	September 25, 2025	3.83	May 14, 2026	4.11	2025–26	21	8.60

In 2016, a New York Times study of the 50 TV shows with the most Facebook likes found that SVU's popularity was "atypical: generally slightly more popular in rural areas and the South, but largely restricted to the eastern half of the country. It is most popular in Albany, N.Y.; least in Colorado and Utah".

=== Awards and honors ===
Law & Order: Special Victims Unit has received many awards and award nominations. Mariska Hargitay has twice been nominated for a Golden Globe Award and won once in 2005.

The show has been nominated numerous times for the Emmy Award. Mariska Hargitay has been nominated for the Outstanding Lead Actress in a Drama Series category eight years in a row beginning in 2004 and won the Emmy in 2006. Christopher Meloni was nominated for the Outstanding Lead Actor in a Drama Series category in 2006. Robin Williams was nominated in the Outstanding Guest Actor in a Drama Series in 2008. The series was nominated in the category Outstanding Guest Actress in a Drama Series for Jane Alexander and Tracy Pollan in 2000, Martha Plimpton in 2002, Barbara Barrie in 2003, Mare Winningham and Marlee Matlin in 2004, Amanda Plummer and Angela Lansbury in 2005, Marcia Gay Harden and Leslie Caron in 2007, Cynthia Nixon in 2008, Ellen Burstyn, Brenda Blethyn, and Carol Burnett in 2009, and Ann-Margret in 2010. The series won the award for Plummer in 2005, Caron in 2007, Nixon in 2008, Burstyn in 2009, and Ann-Margret in 2010.

=== Critical reception ===
Law & Order: Special Victims Unit has been well-received among critics. The show holds an average score of 88% on Rotten Tomatoes. Metacritic gives a score of 66%, from 25 critics review.

In 2014, over 14 years after the show's debut, Joshua Alston of The A.V. Club wrote it that "while SVU isn't yet television's best cop show, it's absolutely its most improved, and that uptick in quality is all the more admirable given that, as the only L&O game in town, it could have just as easily embraced predictability rather than injecting a risky new energy".

In 2023, SVU ranked No. 56 in Variety's 100 Greatest TV Shows of All Time. Daniel D'Addario wrote that "Law & Order: Special Victims Unit" redefined the police drama. By focusing on sex crimes, the series has given voice to sexual assault survivors in a way that had never been done before on TV. Although difficult to watch at times, SVU's stories have pushed the culture to unpack the meaning of consent and guided survivors toward support. After 24 seasons as Olivia Benson, Mariska Hargitay has become a cultural icon and the longest-running live-action character in an American primetime series."

== Russian adaptation ==
In 2007, the Russian production company Studio 2B purchased the rights to create an adaptation of Law & Order: Special Victims Unit for Russian television. Titled Law & Order: Division of Field Investigation, (Note: Russian: Закон и порядок: отдел оперативных расследований, Zakon i poryadok: otdel operativnykh rassledovaniy) the series stars Alisa Bogart and Vica Fiorelia. It follows a unit of investigators in Moscow whose job is to investigate crimes of a sexual nature. The series aired on NTV until 2010 and was produced by Pavel Korchagin, Felix Kleiman and Edward Verzbovski and directed by Dmitry Brusnikin. The screenplays were written by Sergei Kuznvetsov, Elena Karavaeshnikova, and Maya Shapovalova.

== Spin-off ==
On March 31, 2020, it was announced that NBC had ordered an untitled spin-off series to launch in the 2020–21 television season, with Christopher Meloni reprising his role as Elliot Stabler since departing from SVU in 2011. The series order consisted of 13 episodes and premiered on NBC in a two-hour crossover event with SVU on April 1, 2021. On April 25, 2024, it was announced that the series was renewed for a fifth season and would move to Peacock. The fifth season premiered its first two episodes on Peacock on April 17, 2025, with the first episode also having a special airing on NBC.
