= List of longest-running scripted American primetime television series =

List of shows by length

This is a list of the longest-running scripted prime time television series in the United States, as measured by number of seasons. Only shows that have aired on a major broadcast network for seven or more seasons and at least 100 episodes are included. Those that moved to syndication, a cable network, or a streaming service are noted below.

Series shaded in aqua are in production.

Seasons	Series	Network	Genre	First aired	Last aired	Episodes
38	The Simpsons	Fox	Animated sitcom	December 17, 1989 (Note: The Simpsons aired a sneak peek on December 17, 1989.)	present	814 (Note: Not including the 48 shorts, featuring an earlier version of the family, that aired as segments on The Tracey Ullman Show before the series began.)
28	Law & Order: Special Victims Unit	NBC	Crime drama	September 20, 1999	present	599
26	Law & Order	NBC	Crime drama	September 13, 1990	present	549 (Note: Law & Order ended its original run in 2010, and was revived in 2022.)
25	Family Guy	Fox	Animated sitcom	January 31, 1999 (Note: Family Guy aired a sneak peek on January 31, 1999.)	present	462 (Note: Family Guy has two episodes that did not originally air on Fox. "When You Wish Upon a Weinstein" originally aired on Adult Swim and "Partial Terms of Endearment" originally aired in the UK. Family Guy ended its original run in 2002 and was revived by Fox in 2005.)
24	NCIS	CBS	Crime drama	September 23, 2003	present	511
23	Grey's Anatomy	ABC	Medical drama	March 27, 2005	present	470
22	American Dad!	Fox (2005–2014, 2026–) (Note: American Dad! moved to TBS in 2014 for additional seasons. It returned to Fox in 2026.); TBS (2014–2025)	Animated sitcom	May 1, 2005 (Note: American Dad! aired a sneak peek on February 6, 2005.)	present	401
20	Gunsmoke	CBS	Western	September 10, 1955	March 31, 1975	635
19	Lassie	CBS	Drama	September 12, 1954	March 21, 1971	591 (Note: Lassie ran for a total of 19 seasons and 591 episodes. The final two seasons aired in syndication.)
19	Criminal Minds (Note: Also known as Criminal Minds: Evolution (2022–present))	CBS (2005–2020); Paramount+ (2022–present)	Crime drama	September 22, 2005	present	364
16	Bob's Burgers	Fox	Animated sitcom	January 9, 2011	present	313
15	CSI: Crime Scene Investigation	CBS	Crime drama	October 6, 2000	February 15, 2015	337 (Note: CSI: Crime Scene Investigation officially ended its run with Immortality on September 27, 2015. The TV movie is considered the two-episode 16th season, bringing the episode total to 337.)
15	ER	NBC	Medical drama	September 19, 1994	April 2, 2009	331
15	Supernatural	The WB (2005–2006); The CW (2006–2020)	Fantasy drama	September 13, 2005	November 19, 2020	327
15	Chicago Fire	NBC	Procedural drama	October 10, 2012	present	300
15	King of the Hill	Fox (1997-2010); Hulu (2025-present)	Animated sitcom	January 12, 1997	present	279
15	The Jack Benny Program	CBS (1950–1964); NBC (1964–1965)	Sitcom	October 28, 1950 (Note: The Jack Benny Program began with a pilot episode on May 8, 1949.)	April 16, 1965	261
14	The Adventures of Ozzie and Harriet	ABC	Sitcom	October 3, 1952	April 23, 1966	435
14	Bonanza	NBC	Western	September 12, 1959	January 16, 1973	431
14	Dallas	CBS	Soap opera	April 2, 1978	May 3, 1991	357
14	Knots Landing	CBS	Soap opera	December 27, 1979	May 13, 1993	344
14	NCIS: Los Angeles	CBS	Crime drama	September 22, 2009	May 21, 2023	323
14	Blue Bloods	CBS	Crime drama	September 24, 2010	December 13, 2024	293
14	Chicago P.D.	NBC	Crime drama	January 8, 2014	present	269
12	My Three Sons	ABC (1960–1965); CBS (1965–1972)	Sitcom	September 29, 1960	April 13, 1972	380
12	Hawaii Five-O	CBS	Crime drama	September 26, 1968	April 26, 1980	282
12	The Big Bang Theory	CBS	Sitcom	September 24, 2007	May 16, 2019	279
12	Murder, She Wrote	CBS	Crime drama	September 30, 1984	May 19, 1996	264
12	Two and a Half Men	CBS	Sitcom	September 22, 2003	February 19, 2015	262
12	NYPD Blue	ABC	Crime drama	September 21, 1993	March 1, 2005	261
12	Bones	Fox	Crime drama	September 13, 2005	March 28, 2017	246
12	Chicago Med	NBC	Medical drama	November 17, 2015	present	224
11	The Danny Thomas Show (Note: For its first three seasons, The Danny Thomas Show aired as Make Room for Daddy.)	ABC (1953–1957); CBS (1957–1964)	Sitcom	September 29, 1953	April 27, 1964	343
11	Cheers	NBC	Sitcom	September 30, 1982	May 20, 1993	275
11	Frasier	NBC	Sitcom	September 16, 1993	May 13, 2004	264
11	Murphy Brown	CBS	Sitcom	November 14, 1988	December 20, 2018	260 (Note: Murphy Brown ended its original run in 1998 and came back for one more season in 2018.)
11	Married... with Children	Fox	Sitcom	April 5, 1987	June 9, 1997	259
11	M*A*S*H	CBS	Sitcom	September 17, 1972	February 28, 1983	256
11	Happy Days	ABC	Sitcom	January 15, 1974	September 24, 1984	255
11	The Jeffersons	CBS	Sitcom	January 18, 1975	June 25, 1985	253
11	Modern Family	ABC	Sitcom	September 23, 2009	April 8, 2020	250
11	Will & Grace	NBC	Sitcom	September 21, 1998	April 23, 2020	246
11	7th Heaven	The WB (1996–2006); The CW (2006–2007)	Drama	August 26, 1996	May 13, 2007	243
11	The X-Files	Fox	Science fiction	September 10, 1993	March 21, 2018	218 (Note: The X-Files ended its original run in 2002 and returned in 2016 for two more seasons.)
10	Beverly Hills, 90210	Fox	Teen drama, soap opera	October 4, 1990	May 17, 2000	293
10	Hawaii Five-0	CBS	Crime drama	September 20, 2010	April 3, 2020	240
10	Friends	NBC	Sitcom	September 22, 1994	May 6, 2004	236 (+ 1 special)
10	CSI: Miami	CBS	Crime drama	September 23, 2002	April 8, 2012	232
10	Roseanne	ABC	Sitcom	October 18, 1988	May 22, 2018	231 (Note: Roseanne ended its original run in 1997 and returned to television in 2018 for a single season. The revived show later continued as The Conners for the following season and onward as its own program.)
10	The Goldbergs	ABC	Sitcom	September 24, 2013	May 3, 2023	229
10	JAG	NBC (1995–1996); CBS (1997–2005)	Crime drama	September 1, 1995	April 29, 2005	227 (Note: The episode "Skeleton Crew" did not originally air on NBC.)
10	Smallville	The WB (2001–2006); The CW (2006–2011)	Superhero, science fiction	October 16, 2001	May 13, 2011	218
10	The Blacklist	NBC	Crime drama	September 23, 2013	July 13, 2023	218
10	9-1-1	Fox (2018–2023); ABC (2024–present)	Procedural drama	January 3, 2018	present	146
9	The Beverly Hillbillies	CBS	Sitcom	September 26, 1962	March 23, 1971	274
9	Perry Mason	CBS	Legal drama	September 21, 1957	May 22, 1966	271
9	The Love Boat	ABC	Comedy drama	September 24, 1977 (Note: The Love Boat had two pilot movies that aired on September 18, 1976 and January 21, 1977.)	May 24, 1986	250
9	The Virginian (Note: In its final season, the title of The Virginian was changed to The Men from Shiloh.)	NBC	Western	September 19, 1962	March 24, 1971	249
9	The F.B.I.	ABC	Crime drama	September 19, 1965	April 28, 1974	241
9	The Drew Carey Show	ABC	Sitcom	September 13, 1995	September 8, 2004	233
9	Falcon Crest	CBS	Soap opera	December 4, 1981	May 17, 1990	227
9	The Waltons	CBS	Historical drama	September 14, 1972	June 4, 1981	221
9	Dynasty	ABC	Soap opera	January 13, 1981	May 11, 1989	220
9	Family Matters	ABC (1989–1997); CBS (1997–1998)	Sitcom	September 22, 1989	July 17, 1998	215
9	The Middle	ABC	Sitcom	September 30, 2009	May 22, 2018	215
9	Touched by an Angel	CBS	Fantasy drama	September 21, 1994	May 27, 2003	211
9	Everybody Loves Raymond	CBS	Sitcom	September 13, 1996	May 16, 2005	210
9	One Day at a Time	CBS	Sitcom	December 16, 1975	May 28, 1984	209
9	How I Met Your Mother	CBS	Sitcom	September 19, 2005	March 31, 2014	208
9	The King of Queens	CBS	Sitcom	September 21, 1998	May 14, 2007	207
9	All in the Family	CBS	Sitcom	January 12, 1971	April 8, 1979	205
9	24	Fox	Action thriller	November 6, 2001	July 14, 2014	204 + 24: Redemption (Note: In 2014, 24 returned to television with another 12-episode series 24: Live Another Day.)
9	Walker, Texas Ranger	CBS	Action, crime drama	April 21, 1993	May 19, 2001	203 (not incl. TV movie)
9	Alice	CBS	Sitcom	August 31, 1976	March 19, 1985	202
9	The Facts of Life	NBC	Sitcom	August 24, 1979	May 7, 1988	201
9	The Office	NBC	Sitcom	March 24, 2005	May 16, 2013	201
9	Little House on the Prairie	NBC	Western, historical drama	September 11, 1974	March 21, 1983	200 (+5 specials)
9	Coach	ABC	Sitcom	February 28, 1989	May 14, 1997	200
9	CSI: NY	CBS	Crime drama	September 22, 2004	February 22, 2013	197
9	Last Man Standing	ABC (2011–2017); Fox (2018–2021)	Sitcom	October 11, 2011	May 20, 2021	194
9	Night Court	NBC	Sitcom	January 4, 1984	May 31, 1992	193
9	Matlock	NBC (1986–1992); ABC (1992–1995)	Legal drama	September 23, 1986	May 7, 1995	193 (+ pilot movie)
9	One Tree Hill	The WB (2003–2006); The CW (2006–2012)	Teen drama	September 23, 2003	April 4, 2012	187
9	The Flash	The CW	Superhero	October 7, 2014	May 24, 2023	184
9	Scrubs	NBC (2001–2008); ABC (2009–2010)	Sitcom	October 2, 2001	March 17, 2010	182
9	Seinfeld	NBC	Sitcom	July 5, 1989	May 14, 1998	180
9	FBI	CBS	Crime drama	September 25, 2018	present	162
8	The George Burns and Gracie Allen Show	CBS	Sitcom	October 12, 1950	September 15, 1958	291
8	Wagon Train	NBC (1957–1962); ABC (1962–1965)	Western	September 18, 1957	May 2, 1965	284
8	Dragnet	NBC	Crime drama	December 16, 1951	August 23, 1959	276
8	The Donna Reed Show	ABC	Sitcom	September 24, 1958	March 19, 1966	275
8	Bewitched	ABC	Sitcom	September 17, 1964	March 25, 1972	254
8	The Andy Griffith Show	CBS	Sitcom	October 3, 1960	April 1, 1968	249
8	Rawhide	CBS	Western	January 9, 1959	December 7, 1965	217
8	Home Improvement	ABC	Sitcom	September 17, 1991	May 25, 1999	204
8	The Cosby Show	NBC	Sitcom	September 20, 1984	April 30, 1992	201 (and outtakes special)
8	That '70s Show	Fox	Sitcom	August 23, 1998	May 18, 2006	200
8	Ironside	NBC	Crime drama	September 14, 1967 (Note: Ironside began with the pilot movie also titled Ironside on March 28, 1967.)	January 16, 1975	199 (Note: Ironside had three additional episodes after its official final broadcast.)
8	Who's the Boss?	ABC	Sitcom	September 20, 1984	April 25, 1992	196
8	Mannix	CBS	Crime drama	September 16, 1967	April 13, 1975	195
8	Full House	ABC	Sitcom	September 22, 1987	May 23, 1995	192
8	Diff'rent Strokes	NBC (1978–1985); ABC (1985–1986)	Sitcom	November 3, 1978	May 7, 1986	189
8	Newhart	CBS	Sitcom	October 25, 1982	May 21, 1990	184
8	According to Jim	ABC	Sitcom	October 3, 2001	June 2, 2009	182
8	Desperate Housewives	ABC	Comedy drama, soap opera	October 3, 2004	May 13, 2012	180
8	Barnaby Jones	CBS	Crime drama	January 28, 1973	April 3, 1980	178
8	Laverne & Shirley	ABC	Sitcom	January 27, 1976	May 10, 1983	178
8	Diagnosis: Murder	CBS	Medical crime drama	October 29, 1993	May 11, 2001	178 (+ pilot and 5 TV movies)
8	Charmed	The WB	Fantasy drama	October 7, 1998	May 21, 2006	178
8	House	Fox	Medical drama	November 16, 2004	May 21, 2012	177
8	Black-ish	ABC	Sitcom	September 24, 2014	April 19, 2022	176
8	Castle	ABC	Crime drama	March 9, 2009	May 16, 2016	173
8	Three's Company	ABC	Sitcom	March 15, 1977	September 18, 1984	172
8	L.A. Law	NBC	Legal drama	October 3, 1986 (Note: L.A. Law began with a two-hour pilot on September 15, 1986.)	May 19, 1994	172
8	Wings	NBC	Sitcom	April 19, 1990	May 21, 1997	172
8	Girlfriends	UPN (2000–2006); The CW (2006–2008)	Sitcom	September 11, 2000	February 11, 2008	172
8	The Vampire Diaries	The CW	Fantasy, teen drama	September 10, 2009	March 10, 2017	171
8	Barney Miller	ABC	Sitcom	January 23, 1975	May 20, 1982	170
8	Arrow	The CW	Superhero	October 10, 2012	January 28, 2020	170
8	Mom	CBS	Sitcom	September 23, 2013	May 13, 2021	170
8	The Practice	ABC	Legal comedy drama	March 4, 1997	May 16, 2004	167
8	S.W.A.T.	CBS	Action, crime drama	November 2, 2017	May 16, 2025	163
8	Magnum, P.I.	CBS	Crime drama	December 11, 1980	May 8, 1988	162
8	Simon & Simon	CBS	Crime drama	November 24, 1981	January 21, 1989	156
8	The Neighborhood	CBS	Sitcom	October 1, 2018	May 11, 2026	155
8	Brooklyn Nine-Nine	Fox (2013–2018); NBC (2019–2021)	Sitcom	September 17, 2013	September 16, 2021	153
8	Perfect Strangers	ABC	Sitcom	March 25, 1986	August 6, 1993	150
8	Quincy, M.E.	NBC	Medical drama	October 3, 1976	September 4, 1983	148
8	The Rookie	ABC	Crime drama	October 16, 2018	present	144
8	All American	The CW	Sports drama	October 10, 2018	September 28, 2026	132
7	Melrose Place	Fox	Soap opera	July 8, 1992	May 24, 1999	226
7	Petticoat Junction	CBS	Sitcom	September 24, 1963	April 4, 1970	222
7	The Golden Girls	NBC	Sitcom	September 14, 1985	May 21, 1992	180
7	Family Ties	NBC	Sitcom	September 22, 1982	May 14, 1989	176 (+ 1 film)
7	Adam-12	NBC	Crime drama	September 21, 1968	May 20, 1975	174
7	Star Trek: Voyager	UPN	Science fiction	January 16, 1995	May 23, 2001	172
7	Mission: Impossible	CBS	Action	September 17, 1966	March 30, 1973	171
7	Marcus Welby, M.D.	ABC	Medical drama	September 23, 1969 (Note: Marcus Welby, M.D. began with a pilot movie on March 26, 1969.)	May 4, 1976	170
7	Medical Center	CBS	Medical drama	September 24, 1969 (Note: Medical Center began with the pilot movie U.M.C. on April 17, 1969.)	September 6, 1976	170
7	Empty Nest	NBC	Sitcom	October 8, 1988	April 29, 1995	170
7	The Mary Tyler Moore Show	CBS	Sitcom	September 19, 1970	March 19, 1977	168
7	Growing Pains	ABC	Sitcom	September 24, 1985	April 25, 1992	166
7	Mad About You	NBC	Sitcom	September 23, 1992	May 24, 1999	164
7	Designing Women	CBS	Sitcom	September 29, 1986	May 24, 1993	163
7	Sabrina, the Teenage Witch	ABC (1996–2000); The WB (2000–2003)	Sitcom	September 27, 1996	April 24, 2003	163
7	Step by Step	ABC (1991–1997); CBS (1997–1998)	Sitcom	September 20, 1991	June 26, 1998	160
7	Without a Trace	CBS	Crime drama	September 26, 2002	May 19, 2009	160
7	Benson	ABC	Sitcom	September 13, 1979	April 19, 1986	158
7	Boy Meets World	ABC	Sitcom	September 24, 1993	May 5, 2000	158
7	Cold Case	CBS	Crime drama	September 28, 2003	May 2, 2010	156
7	The Good Wife	CBS	Legal drama, political drama	September 22, 2009	May 8, 2016	156
7	Once Upon a Time	ABC	Fantasy drama	October 23, 2011	May 18, 2018	155
7	NCIS: New Orleans	CBS	Crime drama	September 23, 2014	May 23, 2021	155
7	The West Wing	NBC	Political drama	September 22, 1999	May 14, 2006	154 (Note: This includes the special episodes "Documentary Special" and "Isaac and Ishmael", but not the 2020 special "A West Wing Special to Benefit When We All Vote" (primarily a restaging of "Hartsfield's Landing").)
7	Elementary	CBS	Crime drama	September 27, 2012	August 15, 2019	154
7	Hunter	NBC	Crime drama	September 18, 1984	April 26, 1991	153
7	Gilmore Girls	The WB (2000–2006); The CW (2006–2007)	Comedy drama	October 5, 2000	May 15, 2007	153
7	Fantasy Island	ABC	Fantasy drama	January 28, 1978	May 19, 1984	152, plus 2 TV movies (Note: Fantasy Island had two premiere movies that aired on January 14, 1977 and January 20, 1978.)
7	Trapper John, M.D.	CBS	Medical drama	September 23, 1979	September 4, 1986	151
7	Malcolm in the Middle	Fox	Sitcom	January 9, 2000	May 14, 2006	151
7	The Mentalist	CBS	Crime drama	September 23, 2008	February 28, 2015	151
7	Just Shoot Me!	NBC	Sitcom	March 4, 1997	November 26, 2003	148
7	The Dukes of Hazzard	CBS	Action comedy	January 26, 1979	February 8, 1985	147
7	Hill Street Blues	NBC	Crime drama	January 15, 1981	May 12, 1987	146
7	New Girl	Fox	Sitcom	September 20, 2011	May 15, 2018	146
7	Buffy the Vampire Slayer	The WB (1997–2001); UPN (2001–2003)	Supernatural drama	March 10, 1997	May 20, 2003	144
7	In the Heat of the Night	NBC (1988–1992); CBS (1992–1994)	Crime drama	March 6, 1988	May 11, 1994	142 + 4 TV movies
7	Young Sheldon	CBS	Sitcom	September 25, 2017	May 16, 2024	141
7	MacGyver	ABC	Action	September 29, 1985	May 21, 1992	139 + 2 TV films
7	30 Rock	NBC	Sitcom	October 11, 2006	January 31, 2013	138
7	Riverdale	The CW	Teen drama, soap opera	January 26, 2017	August 23, 2023	137
7	Agents of S.H.I.E.L.D.	ABC	Superhero	September 24, 2013	August 12, 2020	136
7	Medium	NBC (2005–2009); CBS (2009–2011)	Supernatural crime drama	January 3, 2005	January 21, 2011	130
7	Parks and Recreation	NBC	Sitcom	April 9, 2009	February 24, 2015	126
7	The Good Doctor	ABC	Medical drama	September 25, 2017	May 21, 2024	126
7	Cagney & Lacey	CBS	Crime drama	March 25, 1982 (Note: Cagney & Lacey began with a pilot movie on October 8, 1981.)	May 16, 1988	125 (+ pilot and 4 TV movies)
7	Scandal	ABC	Political thriller	April 5, 2012	April 19, 2018	124
7	Homicide: Life on the Street	NBC	Crime drama	January 31, 1993	May 21, 1999	122
7	SEAL Team	CBS (2017–2021); Paramount+ (2021–2024)	Action	September 27, 2017	October 6, 2024	114
7	The Conners	ABC	Sitcom	October 16, 2018	April 23, 2025	112
7	Legends of Tomorrow	The CW	Superhero	January 21, 2016	March 2, 2022	110
7	Cheyenne	ABC	Western	September 20, 1955 (Note: Cheyenne began as a rotating element of Warner Bros. Presents.)	December 17, 1962	107
7	Station 19	ABC	Action, procedural drama	March 22, 2018	May 30, 2024	105
7	Rules of Engagement	CBS	Sitcom	February 5, 2007	May 20, 2013	100
7	The 100	The CW	Science fiction	March 19, 2014	September 30, 2020	100

== See also ==
- Lists of longest-running American shows by broadcast type:
  - List of longest-running American television series
  - List of longest-running American broadcast network television series
  - List of longest-running American cable television series
  - List of longest-running American first-run syndicated television series
  - List of longest-running American primetime television series
