= Law & Order: Special Victims Unit season 1 =

Season of American television series (1999–2000)

Law & Order: Special Victims Unit
- Season 1
- Season 1 U.S. DVD cover
- Starring: Christopher Meloni; Mariska Hargitay; Richard Belzer; Dann Florek; Michelle Hurd
- No. of episodes: 22

Release
- Original network: NBC
- Original release: September 20, 1999 – May 19, 2000

Season chronology
- Next → Season 2

The first season of the crime drama television series Law & Order: Special Victims Unit, premiered on September 20, 1999 on NBC and concluded on May 19, 2000. Created by Dick Wolf, it is the first spin-off of Law & Order and follows the detectives of a fictionalized version of the New York City Police Department's Special Victims Unit, which investigates sexually based offenses. SVU originally aired on Monday nights at 9pm/8c EST, but it was moved to Friday nights at 10pm/9c after the ninth episode. Showrunner Robert Palm felt too disturbed by the subject matter and left after the season's conclusion.

The season has been well-received, with critics praising its captivating narratives and memorable characters. The Law & Order: Special Victims Unit first season DVD box set was released on October 21, 2003, in Region 1 format.

== Episodes ==
Law & Order: Special Victims Unit season 1 episodes
No. overall	No. in season	Title	Directed by	Written by	Original release date	Prod. code	U.S. viewers (millions)
1	1	"Payback"	Jean de Segonzac	Dick Wolf	September 20, 1999	E0901	14.13
Two detectives from the NYPD's Special Victims Unit, Olivia Benson and Elliot Stabler, investigate the stabbing and castration of a cab driver, only to learn that the victim had purchased a phony hack license from an inmate (Matt Skollar) at Rikers Island. Further investigation reveals that the dead man was a Serbian soldier named Stefan Tanzic, who had been indicted on charges of ethnic cleansing. Herself a child of rape, Benson has trouble separating herself from the case after realizing that the victim was a rapist. Stabler tries to keep her from crossing the line in her attempts to protect suspects whom she feels were justified in their actions.: Guest starring: Elizabeth Ashley, Ned Eisenberg, Tina Benko, Ronald Guttman, Mili Avital; Special appearance by Angie Harmon as ADA Abbie Carmichael.
2	2	"A Single Life"	Lesli Linka Glatter	Miriam Kazdin	September 27, 1999	E0903	13.06
The body of a young woman is discovered beneath an apartment building, clad only in a red slip. Detectives Benson and Stabler determine that the name she had been using was an alias, and investigation reveals she had constructed a false identity following her graduation from high school in order to distance herself from her father (Paul Hecht), who had subjected her to years of sexual abuse. The investigation leads the detectives to two men who had been in romantic relationships with the victim, her psychiatrist (Dennis Boutsikaris) and a prominent television news anchor (Michael Nouri).: Guest starring: Laila Robins, Michael Gaston, Matthew Arkin; Special appearance by Angie Harmon as ADA Abbie Carmichael and Laila Robins as Ellen Travis.
3	3	"...Or Just Look Like One"	Rick Rosenthal	Michael R. Perry	October 4, 1999	E0907	12.20
When sixteen-year-old model Jazmin Burgess is found beaten and sexually assaulted outside Roosevelt Hospital in the early morning hours, Benson and Stabler launch an investigation into how the teenager came to be alone on the street at that hour. Toxicology results reveal significant amounts of drugs in the victim's system, prompting detectives to scrutinize the modeling agency representing Jazmin as well as a photographer (Ritchie Coster) who had recently dismissed her from a shoot over her weight. The case resonates personally with Stabler, whose daughter Maureen has been displaying signs of an eating disorder.: Guest starring: Bebe Neuwirth, Catherine Dent, Damian Young, Todd Stashwick, Michael Mastro; Special appearances by Jerry Orbach as Det. Lennie Briscoe, Jesse L. Martin as Det. Ed Green, Bebe Neuwirth as Nina Laszlo, and Carolyn McCormick as Dr. Elizabeth Olivet
4	4	"Hysteria"	Richard Dobbs	Dawn DeNoon & Lisa Marie Petersen	October 11, 1999	E0908	13.72
Benson and Stabler investigate the death of a woman initially thought to be connected to a series of killings targeting prostitutes. As evidence about the victim’s personal life emerges, the detectives begin to doubt that her case is related to the other murders. Meanwhile, suspicions surrounding a police officer (Joe Lisi) lead Cragen to seek assistance from Det. Lennie Briscoe.: Special appearance by Jerry Orbach as Det. Lennie Briscoe.
5	5	"Wanderlust"	David Jones	Wendy West	October 18, 1999	E0905	14.30
After a travel writer (Bruce Barney) is found nude, strangled, and beaten to death with lingerie stuffed down his throat and duct tape over his mouth, Benson and Stabler initially suspect his landlady's (Patricia Richardson) boyfriend (John Dossett), a convicted child molester. But suspicion soon turns to the landlady and her daughter (Lynn Collins), who seemed far too interested in what their tenant was doing with his time. After learning the daughter had a sexual relationship with the tenant, things take an even stranger turn.
6	6	"Sophomore Jinx"	Clark Johnson	John Chambers	October 25, 1999	E0904	12.48
After a female student is found raped and murdered at a local college, Benson and Stabler turn their attention to two star players on the school's basketball team. However, the college, unwilling to risk the negative publicity that the investigation could bring to the school and the upcoming championship, blocks their investigation at every turn. But the worst secret actually lies with one of her teachers.: Special appearance by Angie Harmon as ADA Abbie Carmichael.; Special appearance by Reverend Al Sharpton as himself.
7	7	"Uncivilized"	Michael Fields	Story by : Robert Palm; Teleplay by : Robert Palm & Wendy West	November 15, 1999	E0912	11.95
When a young boy is found murdered, suspicion leads Benson and Stabler to a recently paroled child molester (Stephen Bogardus), who soon becomes a test case for a new and broader application of civil commitment. Although they both hate what the man has done in the past, it is soon obvious to the detectives that the teenagers who initially steered them in the man's direction (Jerry Careccio and Dominick Charles Carbone) are hiding disturbing secrets of their own.
8	8	"Stalked"	Peter Medak	Roger Garrett	November 22, 1999	E0911	10.57
When the body of an assistant district attorney is found raped and beaten in Central Park, Benson lets her emotions get the best of her as she takes it upon herself to bring the suspected rapist, a local realtor (Bruce Kirkpatrick), to justice. Stabler tries to get the man's business partner to help in the investigation, but Benson may be the one who ends up needing help.
9	9	"Stocks & Bondage"	Constantine Makris	Michael R. Perry	November 29, 1999	E0914	10.90
When a financial analyst and devotee of BDSM is found strangled to death in a leather harness in her bedroom, Benson and Stabler at first suspect either suicide or accidental death from autoerotic asphyxiation. However, the discovery of a large quantity of hidden diamonds leads the detectives into a shadowy world of money laundering and securities fraud.
10	10	"Closure: Part 1"	Stephen Wertimer	Wendy West	January 7, 2000	E0915	13.66
Benson does her best to help a rape victim (Tracy Pollan), who is able to describe her attack, but not the attacker (Neil Maffin) in perfect detail. When the detectives revisit the case a few months later, they find the woman even less willing to talk about what happened, as she claims she has moved on. Things turn uncomfortable within the squad when Benson and Cassidy, who spent a night together, argue over whether the relationship should be continued.: "Closure: Part 2" aired in Season 2 Episode 3; Special appearance by Angie Harmon as ADA Abbie Carmichael.
11	11	"Bad Blood"	Michael Fields	Dawn DeNoon & Lisa Marie Petersen	January 14, 2000	E0916	13.11
The death of a young gay man initially leads Benson and Stabler to investigate his homophobic father, but once they start looking into the young man's living arrangements, they realize the person they're looking for may be closer than they think. Munch tries to help Benson find the man who raped her mother.: Special appearance by Angie Harmon as ADA Abbie Carmichael.
12	12	"Russian Love Poem"	Rick Rosenthal	Eva Nagorski	January 21, 2000	E0913	14.33
When Andrew Harlin, a bisexual multi-millionaire, is found murdered in his home, Benson and Stabler turn their suspicion to Harlin's long list of lovers. Evidence at the crime scene leads detectives to a pair of Russian escorts, but before they can get the truth from them, one turns up dead, and the boyfriend (Olek Krupa) of the other confesses to murder.
13	13	"Disrobed"	David Platt	Janet Tamaro	February 4, 2000	E0910	15.14
After a judge is found murdered in his car, the detectives begin looking into his background and learn that he often delivered special verdicts for women in return for sexual favors. The team soon turns its eye to a battered wife (Kathryn Meisle) with a secret. Detective Cassidy transfers to Narcotics feeling unable to cope with the SVU cases, leaving Munch without a partner.
14	14	"Limitations"	Constantine Makris	Michael R. Perry	February 11, 2000	E0919	12.24
At the request of a victim, the police commissioner comes to Cragen with a special request: close the case of the man who raped three women (Jenny Bacon, Judith Hawkins and Seana Kofoed) nearly five years ago before the statute of limitations expires. The detectives finally get a lead when they realize one of the victims knows the rapist, but she is not willing to talk. Following Cassidy's departure, Munch is partnered with Jeffries.
15	15	"Entitled"	Ed Sherin	Teleplay by : Robert Palm & Wendy West; Story by : Dick Wolf & René Balcer & Robert Palm	February 18, 2000	E0918	17.13
After a salesman is murdered, the detectives turn their attention to Stephanie Mulroney (Noelle Beck), the youngest daughter of a well-known family with some deep connections. But as they join forces with the officers from the 27th Precinct, they realize that their case is connected with a long-unsolved case that Briscoe once handled years ago with his former partner, Detective Mike Logan. Note: This episode begins a crossover event that concludes on Law & Order season 10 episode 14 "Entitled". Cast: Special guest appearances include Jerry Orbach as Det. Lennie Briscoe, Jesse L. Martin as Det. Ed Green, Sam Waterston as EADA Jack McCoy, Steven Hill as DA Adam Schiff, and Angie Harmon as ADA Abbie Carmichael.
16	16	"The Third Guy"	Jud Taylor	Dawn DeNoon & Lisa Marie Petersen	February 25, 2000	E0920	13.68
An elderly woman is found tied up and sexually assaulted in her apartment and suspicion is initially on the young men that had broken into her home and robbed her. Once the detectives catch the young men, they learn that there was someone else in the apartment. The offered plea bargain initially doesn't go over well, but they finally reach a deal which leaves the detectives with a new case - whether or not the person who sexually assaulted the woman (Denis O'Hare) was mentally handicapped.
17	17	"Misleader"	Richard Dobbs	Story by : Nick Harding & Nick Kendrick; Teleplay by : Nick Kendrick	March 31, 2000	E0902	12.45
After the pregnant daughter-in-law of a prominent Christian right leader (Robert Foxworth) is found murdered in her hotel room, the detectives investigate a rash of hotel burglaries, only to discover that her adultery (and the probable father of her child) was what led to her death.
18	18	"Chat Room"	Richard Dobbs	Roger Garrett	April 14, 2000	E0923	12.67
When a teenage girl (Paz de la Huerta) comes into the squad room to tell the detectives that she was raped by a man she met on the Internet, the detectives set up a special sting operation. They end up stepping on some highly-placed toes as Munch plays the kid to net the big fish.: The episode is followed by a public service announcement that reads: At any given moment there are 3.4 million anonymous chat room users on the internet.
19	19	"Contact"	Michael Zinberg	Robert Palm & Wendy West	April 28, 2000	E0921	12.84
After seven young women in a six-month time span are raped by a flash-and-dash assailant (Sal Viscuso) on the city subways, the brass calls in a psychiatrist to help the team get into the head of the perpetrator. When he is caught, all seven victims identify him in a police lineup, but the IDs are suppressed. However, the detectives find that he possesses the driver's license of a new victim who could put him away.
20	20	"Remorse"	Alexander Cassini	Michael R. Perry	May 5, 2000	E0924	11.94
Television reporter Sarah Logan (Jennifer Esposito) refuses to let her recent rape get her down, and talks about her experiences on the air, leading to the arrest of a young man that the team feels is responsible. Over the course of the investigation, Munch and Jeffries become unusually affected by the case, albeit in different ways.
21	21	"Nocturne"	Jean de Segonzac	Wendy West	May 12, 2000	E0922	13.70
After a pharmacy turns over some disturbing photos of a young boy, Benson and Stabler arrest a piano teacher (Kent Broadhurst) for child molestation. After the boy claims to have seen other pictures of young boys at the teacher's house, the detectives get a warrant and discover a series of videos that document the life of a young boy named Evan (Wilson Jermaine Heredia). Believing he can make or break their case, the team searches for him, only to realize that his testimony may not help at all because Evan is scarred far more deeply than they realized.
22	22	"Slaves"	Ted Kotcheff	Lisa Marie Petersen & Dawn DeNoon	May 19, 2000	E0926	12.16
After a shopkeeper brings a note for help to the squad, the detectives begin trying to locate a young Romanian woman named Ilena (Layla Alexander), who has not been seen in months. The squad eventually find her working as a nanny at the home of the Morrows (Andrew McCarthy and Susan Floyd), a successful yuppie couple who harbor a terrible secret. A forensic psychologist analyzes the team, and presents disturbing findings to Cragen, suggesting that one of the detectives be removed from the team immediately.: Robert Palm leaves the show as executive producer.

== Production ==
=== Development ===
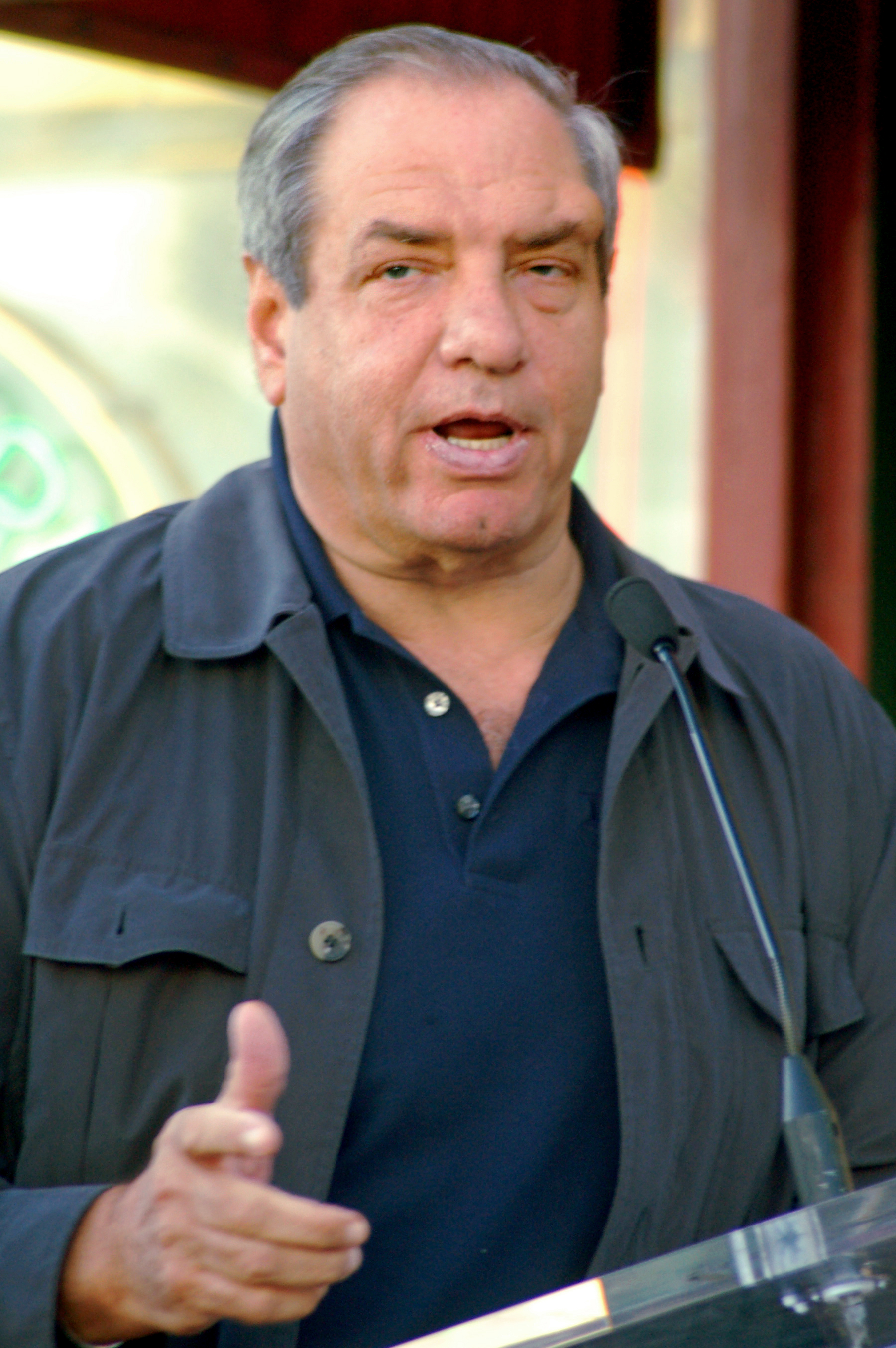
Dick Wolf is the creator and executive producer of this series.

Inspiration for the series came from a 1986 murder in Central Park committed by Robert Emmet Chambers whose strategy in court was to sexualize the victim. The season one episode of Law & Order, "Kiss the Girls and Make Them Die" is based on this case. Dick Wolf wanted to continue exploring similar themes in a dedicated legal drama and hired Ted Kotcheff and Robert Palm as executive producers of the new series, as well as Jean de Segonzac, the franchise director for Law & Order. Robert Palm was previously an executive producer on Law & Order and was the first person to use the term "mothership" to distinguish the original from its spin-offs. This phrase has become popular with fans of the franchise.

Unlike the original Law & Order, filming for SVU began in North Bergen, New Jersey since there was not enough real estate available to get a studio in Manhattan. The production staff were still told to think of the area as being Manhattan. As with Law & Order, writers for the series primarily worked in Los Angeles. However, SVU featured more female writers with the series aiming to bring a "strong woman's perspective" to the screen. Writer Dawn DeNoon has mentioned that many of the writing staff were fired during the first season because their scripts were not up to par.

=== Casting ===
For the lead roles, Christopher Meloni was cast as Detective Elliot Stabler and Mariska Hargitay was cast as Detective Olivia Benson after they auditioned together. Hargitay, who had to move from Los Angeles to New York when she got the role, said she was able to do this on short notice because she was already planning on moving to New York to pursue a Broadway career. The squad commander role was filled by Dann Florek, who had portrayed Captain Don Cragen for the first three seasons on the original Law & Order and later reprised his role in Exiled: A Law & Order Movie. He joined the cast on the condition that he not be asked to audition. Richard Belzer was cast as Detective John Munch, continuing his role from the series Homicide: Life on the Street. In Belzer's words, he was cast because "Dick Wolf and Tom Fontana got drunk at a party". Halfway through the season, Richard Belzer reprised his role of Munch in Homicide: The Movie, which briefly shows his character out on a case in his SVU context in New York. At Belzer's insistence, his character was partnered with Brian Cassidy, who was portrayed by Dean Winters. However, Winters' contractual obligation to the HBO series Oz forced him to leave halfway through the season. Michelle Hurd, who portrayed Detective Monique Jeffries, filled Winters' void for the remainder of the season, and was at that point added to the main credits.

== Cast ==
=== Main ===
- Christopher Meloni as Senior Detective Elliot Stabler
- Mariska Hargitay as Junior Detective Olivia Benson
- Richard Belzer as Senior Detective John Munch
- Dann Florek as Captain Donald "Don" Cragen
- Michelle Hurd as Junior Detective Monique Jeffries (episodes 14–22, recurring episodes 1–3, 6–13)

=== Crossover stars from Law & Order ===
- Angie Harmon as Assistant District Attorney Abbie Carmichael
- Leslie Hendrix as Medical Examiner Dr. Elizabeth Rodgers
- Steven Hill as Manhattan, District Attorney Adam Schiff
- Jesse L. Martin as Junior Homicide Detective Ed Green
- Jerry Orbach as Senior Homicide Detective Lennie Briscoe
- Sam Waterston as Executive Assistant District Attorney Jack McCoy

=== Recurring ===
- Harvey Atkin as Judge Alan Ridenour
- Reiko Aylesworth as Assistant District Attorney Erica Alden
- Erin Broderick as Maureen Stabler
- Patricia Cook as Elizabeth Stabler
- Frank Deal as Defense Attorney Don Newvine
- Isabel Gillies as Kathy Stabler
- Judy Del Giudice as Judge Elizabeth Masullo
- Peter Francis James as Judge Kevin Beck
- Chris Orbach as Junior Detective Ken Briscoe
- Audra McDonald as Dr. Audrey Jackson
- Lance Reddick as Medical Examiner Dr. Taylor
- Jeffrey Scaperrotta as Dickie Stabler
- Holiday Segal as Kathleen Stabler
- Jenna Stern as Assistant District Attorney Kathleen Eastman
- Dean Winters as Junior Detective Brian Cassidy

=== Guest stars ===
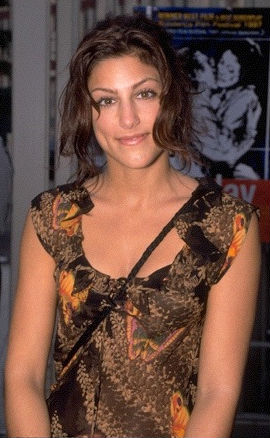
Jennifer Esposito played reporter Sarah Logan, a rape victim who is also targeted by a stalker.

The first season featured the highest number of crossover appearances in SVU. Angie Harmon portrayed her Law & Order character ADA Abbie Carmichael for six episodes. Jerry Orbach (Det. Lennie Briscoe) and his new partner Jesse L. Martin (Det. Ed Green) were shown working together in the third episode. Almost the entire cast of the original series appeared in the crossover episode "Entitled." Another character establishing ties to the original was Detective Ken Briscoe, the nephew of Lennie Briscoe. He was played by Chris Orbach, the son of Jerry Orbach. The younger Orbach later said that he had mixed feelings about his role on the show, as he felt he "only got the gig because of [his] old man." Years after that, he'd admit to friends that he was simply very nervous on set about living up to his dad, and felt out of his depth.

Family members of both lead detectives appeared in the opening episode. Kathy Stabler, Elliot Stabler's wife, was played by Isabel Gillies. Gillies continued to play Kathy Stabler over the course of the next 11 years either as a guest star or a recurring actress. She recalled that she was in the middle of buying a wedding dress when she got the call to be on SVU. Elizabeth Ashley was cast to play Serena Benson, Olivia's mother. Serena Benson did not appear in SVU again but was mentioned several times. Her character's history of being a rape victim who never got justice—and whose attacker was Olivia's biological father—figures in many later episodes.

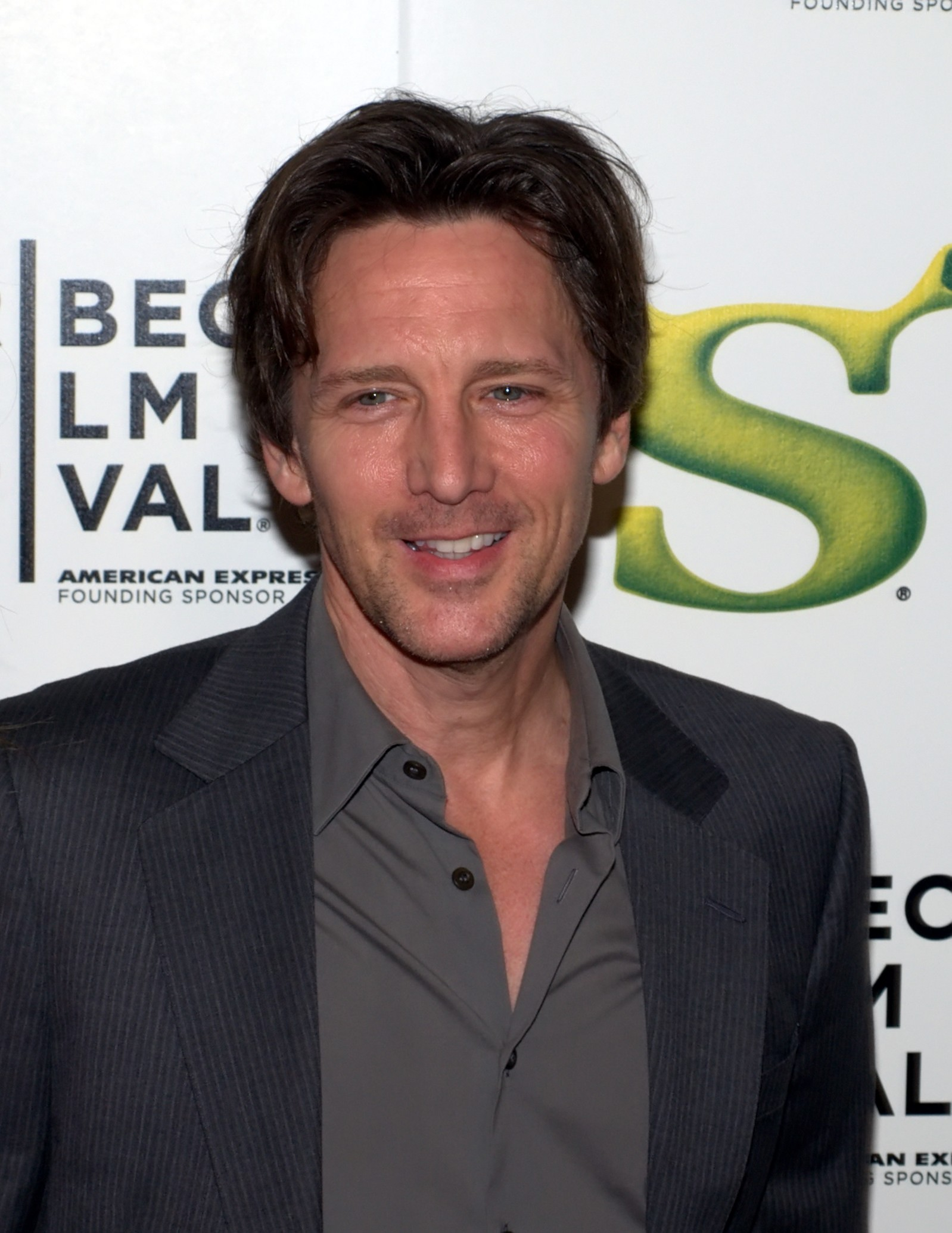
Andrew McCarthy guest starred as Randolph Morrow, a sadistic rapist who keeps a sex slave locked in his room.

Some of the earliest revelations about Detective Benson's personal life are found in "Stalked." In this episode, Bruce Kirkpatrick played a rapist who decides to intimidate the detectives once he learns that he is under investigation. An episode dealing with mental illness, "The Third Guy," featured a guest performance by Denis O'Hare. He played an intellectually disabled rapist who elicits differing opinions in the SVU.

The episode "Closure" aired shortly before Detective Brian Cassidy left the Special Victims Unit. However, because of its nonlinear storytelling, it portrayed Cassidy as still working for the unit months later. Despite the continuity error, the producers decided to revisit this episode in the second season owing to the cliffhanger ending and Tracy Pollan's well-received performance as Harper Anderson, a rape victim who becomes obsessed with taking revenge on her attacker. She was nominated for the Primetime Emmy Award for Outstanding Guest Actress in a Drama Series.

Reiko Aylesworth was one of the actresses who originally auditioned for the role of Olivia Benson. Instead, she was cast as Assistant District Attorney Erica Alden, whom she played in the last three episodes of the season. In the season's penultimate episode, "Nocturne," Kent Broadhurst played Lawrence Holt, a piano teacher who molests his students. Wilson Jermaine Heredia played Evan, Holt's student and victim, who knows more about Holt's crimes than he lets on.

== Reception ==
=== Critical reception ===
The first season of this series received generally positive reviews from critics, though some noted that it took time for the series to establish a distinct identity separate from its parent series, Law & Order. Early praise centered on the show’s willingness to confront sensitive and often taboo subjects related to sexual crimes and victimization, themes that were relatively uncommon on network television at the time. Mariska Hargitay and Christopher Meloni were frequently commended for their strong performances and compelling on-screen chemistry, which helped to anchor the series emotionally and differentiate it from the more procedural tone of Law & Order. Critics also highlighted the show’s more character-driven approach, particularly in exploring the psychological toll such cases take on the detectives.

On Rotten Tomatoes, the season has an approval rating of 84% with an average score of 7.5 out of 10 based on 43 reviews. The website's critical consensus reads, “Special Victims Unit often blurs the line between socially conscious and exploitative, but Mariska Hargitay and Christopher Meloni's terse chemistry adds a dimension of personality to the absorbing Law & Order formula. Metacritic gave the season a score a weighted average based on the impression of 22 critical reviews—of 68 signifying generally favorable reviews. The pilot episode was generally well received, and Caryn James of The New York Times said that "the show swiftly finds its balance. Not every series lends itself to cloning, but the essential qualities of Law and Order seem made for it: headline-generated stories resolved in self-contained episodes; a no-nonsense tone; a cast large enough to vary the focus."

Bruce Fretts of Entertainment Weekly said that season one was "refreshingly dark-hearted alternative" and that it was "top-heavy with lightweight dramedies". Joyce Millman of Salon.com said the season was "melodramatic and manipulative, splattered with awkward attempts at comedy", then she criticized the season progression, proclaiming "simultaneously soggy and crisp not an appealing combination however you slice it". Phil Gallo of Variety critiqued the portrayal of Detective Brian Cassidy in early SVU, describing him as ‘an irksome single note’ who seemed underwritten in the ensemble mix. New York Magazine’s John Leonard highlighted the show’s tonal shift toward psychological complexity in the Season 1 finale, noting the team's involvement in investigating a human-slavery case—and hinting at internal unit turmoil: “even as they are being evaluated for stress… find themselves investigating… a case of human slavery… a cliffhanger, in that we won’t learn until next fall which member of the unit needs shrink‑wrapping".

=== Ratings ===
The first season's ratings were consistently medium, ranking #33 in its time-slot and leading its closest competition by 12.8 million viewers per episode, making it one of NBC's top-rated shows of the year. According to Rotten Tomatoes, the season holds a rating of 75% based on critic reviews, praising the performances and the series's bold approach to sensitive topics. Law & Order: Special Victims Unit premiered during the 1999–2000 United States television season, initially airing on NBC on Mondays at 9:00 p.m. before moving to Fridays at 10:00 p.m. after the ninth episode. According to the Nielsen ratings system, the season achieved an average household rating of 8.8 with a 15% share, ranking 33rd among all primetime shows for that television year.

== DVD release ==
Law & Order: Special Victims Unit - The First Year was released as a widescreen 2-disc Region 1 DVD box set in the USA on October 21, 2003. It was distributed by Universal Pictures Home Entertainment.

Law & Order: Special Victims Unit - The First Year
Set Details		Special Features
22 Episodes; 6-Disc Set; English (Dolby Digital 5.1 Surround), French, Spanish		Special Victims Unit: The beginning Featurette.; Dann Florek squad room walk-through.
Release Dates
Region 1	Region 2	Region 4
October 21, 2003	February 28, 2005	January 19, 2005
