= Michelle Hurd =

American actress (born 1966)

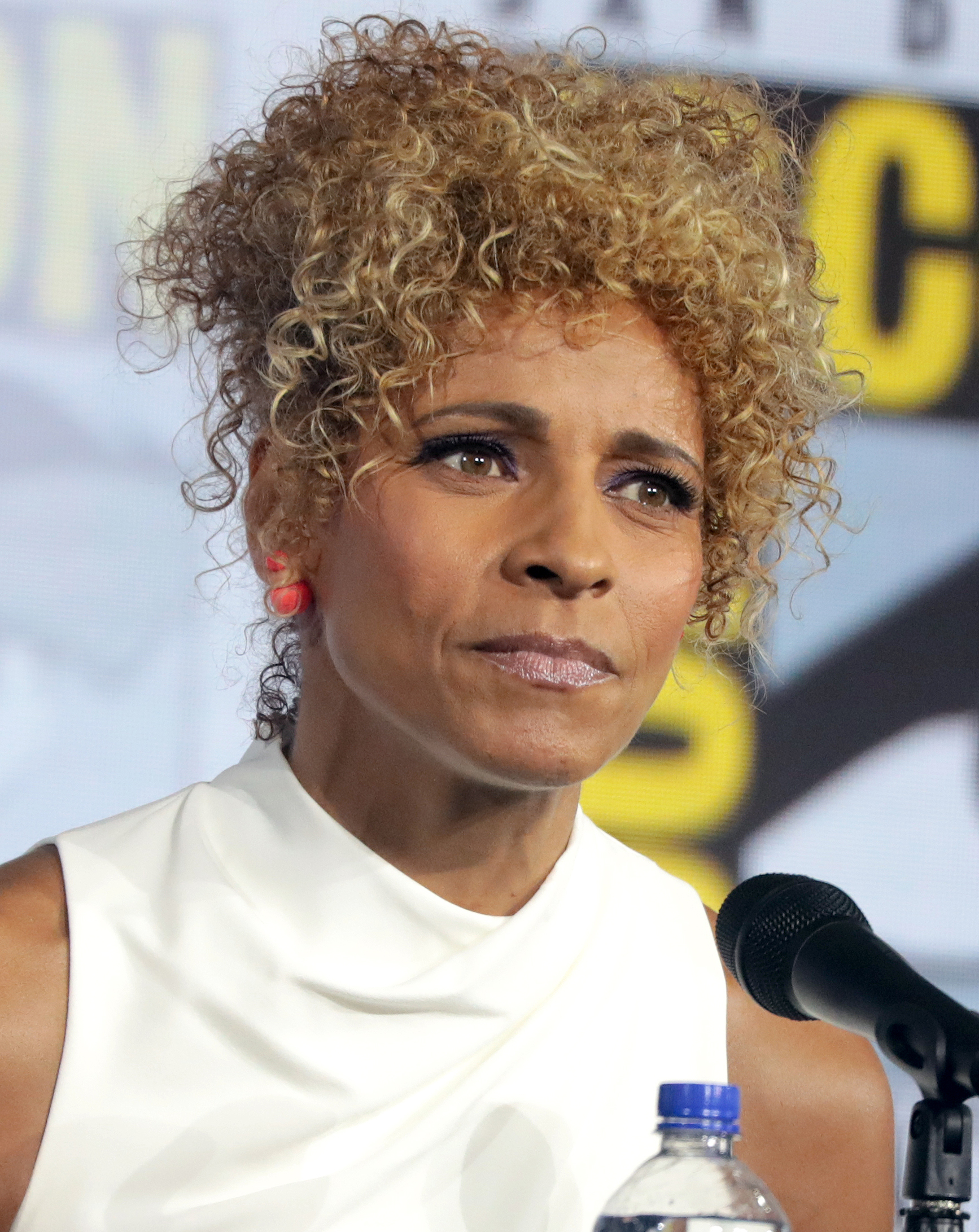
- Hurd at the 2019 San Diego Comic-Con
- Born: December 21, 1966 (age 59); New York City, New York, U.S.
- Education: Boston University (BFA)
- Occupation: Actress
- Years active: 1989–present
- Spouse: Garret Dillahunt (m. 2007)
- Parent: Hugh Hurd (father)

Michelle Hurd (born December 21, 1966) is an American actress and secretary-treasurer of SAG AFTRA. Hurd has worked as a television character actress, first appearing on the soap opera Another World (1991–1997). She later earned recognition for playing Monique Jeffries in the legal drama Law & Order: Special Victims Unit (1999–2001). Afterwards, she led the drama series Leap Years (2001–2002) and held recurring roles in the drama series Skin (2003), the comedy According to Jim (2004), the medical drama ER (2006–2007), and the teen drama Gossip Girl (2007–2008).

Hurd starred in the crime drama The Glades (2010–2013), the comedy horror Ash vs Evil Dead (2016), and the crime drama Blindspot (2015–2018). She played Raffi Musiker in the science fiction series Star Trek: Picard (2020–2023), and achieved her highest-grossing film with the romantic comedy Anyone but You (2023).

Hurd ran in 2025 for secretary-treasurer of SAG-AFTRA and was elected to a two-year term.

== Early life ==
Michelle Hurd is the daughter of actor Hugh Hurd and Merlyn Hurd (née Purdy), an actress and clinical psychologist. She is biracial, with her father being black and her mother being white. Her parents met when they appeared in the same Broadway show. Hurd has two sisters and they were raised in Greenwich Village, Manhattan in the Westbeth Artists Housing. She graduated from Saint Ann's School in 1984 and Boston University in 1988, and studied with the Alvin Ailey School. After her graduation from college, she studied at London's National Theatre.

== Career ==
One of Hurd's early Off Broadway performances was in the play The Constant Couple in 1991. A review in The Nation predicted that this would be a stepping stone to Broadway roles. Hurd made her Broadway debut in the 1996 Stephen Sondheim–George Furth play Getting Away with Murder. Her other theatre credits include Othello, A.M.L., Hamlet and The Hunchback of Notre-Dame. Hurd acted in Looking for the Pony for Manhattan Theater Source with her sister Adrienne and in 900 Oneonta for Circle Repertory Company with Garret Dillahunt who would become her husband. She won the Robbie Award and the California Theatre Award for Best Supporting Actress in a Drama for the premiere of Richard Greenberg's The Violet Hour.

Michelle Hurd appeared as the comic book superhero B.B. DaCosta / Fire in the failed television pilot Justice League of America in 1997. Her other early television appearances include stand-in work for The Cosby Show, as well as guest appearances on New York Undercover, The Practice and The Cosby Mysteries. Her experiences filming the latter series led her to come forward as a witness to a woman being drugged by Bill Cosby. Hurd's association with the Law & Order franchise began with her appearance in a 1997 episode of the titular series. Her performance as a corrupt FBI informant caught the attention of Law & Order producer Dick Wolf, who two years later cast her in the spin-off Law & Order: Special Victims Unit as Detective Monique Jeffries. She co-starred with Christopher Meloni and Mariska Hargitay for the first season before leaving the main cast in 2000. She appeared in the first, seventh and sixteenth episodes of season two.

After her time on SVU, Hurd had television roles in Charmed, The O.C., According to Jim, Shark, Bones, and Gossip Girl. She collaborated with her husband again in the 2001 Showtime original series Leap Years. From 2006 to 2007, she had a recurring role on ER as television news producer Courtney Brown, who becomes close to Dr. Kerry Weaver. She also returned to the stage, playing the lead role Diana in the Washington Shakespeare Theatre Company's February 10 – March 29, 2009 production of Lope de Vega's Dog in the Manger.

In 2010, Hurd began a role on the A&E Network drama The Glades, playing Colleen Manus. In March 2018, it was announced that Hurd would have a leading role in the CBS reboot of Cagney & Lacey, playing the character Mary Beth Lacey (originated by Tyne Daly in the original series), appearing alongside Sarah Drew.

In 2014, she appeared as Constance "Connie" Irving in Season 1 of the streaming series Bosch. She was then replaced by Erika Alexander in season 2.

In 2016, Hurd had a recurring role in the second season of Daredevil as Samantha Reyes, a corrupt district attorney overseeing the prosecution of Frank Castle. Hurd had debuted the role in the season 1 finale of Jessica Jones.

On April 26, 2018, Michelle Hurd spoke in a panel for World Intellectual Property Day with a theme of celebrating the creative output of women.

In 2019, Hurd was cast in the role of Raffi Musiker in the Paramount Plus series Star Trek: Picard. The series began streaming on the service in January 2020.

Since October 2021, Hurd has served as National Vice President of SAG-AFTRA Los Angeles Local, taking over for Clyde Kusatsu.

== Secretary-Treasurer of SAG-AFTRA ==
On September 12, 2025, it was announced that Hurd was elected secretary-treasurer of SAG-AFTRA for a two year term. From August 13 to September 12, 2025 voting was held for the positions of president and secretary-treasurer, with Hurd running on the same ticket as Sean Astin and standing against Peter Antico for secretary-treasurer. Hurd received 64.77% of the vote from participating SAG-AFTRA members.

== Personal life ==
In 2007, Hurd married actor Garret Dillahunt.

In 2014, Hurd alleged that Bill Cosby was "very inappropriate with me," becoming one of the numerous women who alleged Cosby sexually assaulted them. She alleged that Cosby had inappropriately touched her in his dressing room during her time as a Cosby Show stand-in actress.

== Filmography ==
Key
†	Denotes works that have not yet been released

=== Film ===
Year	Title	Role	Notes
1989	Rude Awakening	Student on Street	
1994	The Dark Knight	Camille	Short film
1998	Wilbur Falls	State police #2	
1999	Personals	Lorraine	
1999	Random Hearts	Susan	
2000	Double Parked	Lola	
2006	Play It by Ear	Mary Ann	
2012	Girl Most Likely	Libby	
2015	I Spit on Your Grave III: Vengeance Is Mine	Detective Glenn Bolton	
2016	Search Engines	Petra	
2017	Be Afraid	Christine Booth	
2017	We Don't Belong Here	Tania	
2018	Being Frank	Marcy Kempler	
2020	Bad Hair	Maxine	
2023	Somewhere in Montana	Kat	
2023	Anyone but You	Carol	
2024	Kemba	Odessa Smith	
2025	Where the Wind Blows	Mrs. Hollyhock	
2026	Office Romance	Rachael Goldberg	
2026	One Night Only	Detective Vanessa Bryan Brown	

=== Television ===
Year	Title	Role	Notes
1991–97	Another World	Dana Kramer	Main role
1994	Vanishing Son II	Anita	Television film
1994–95	New York Undercover	ADA Reynolds	Recurring role (seasons 1–2); 5 episodes
1995	Ghostwriter	Emmaline Lewis	Recurring role
1995	The Cosby Mysteries	Jogger	Episode: "Comic Book Murder"
1995	New York News	Asia	Episode: "Good-Bye Gator"
1997	Law & Order	Angela Roney	Episode: "Entrapment"
1997	The Practice	Renee Williams	Episode: "Part V" & "Dog Bite"
1997	Players	Laura Jenkins	Episode: "Con Amore"
1997	Justice League of America	B.B. DaCosta / Fire	Television film
1997–98	Malcolm & Eddie	Simone Lewis	Recurring role (season 2)
1998	Beyond Belief: Fact or Fiction	Diane Lerner	Episode: "The Getaway"
1999	Action	Gina	Episode: "Pilot"
1999–2001	Law & Order: Special Victims Unit	Monique Jeffries	Main role (season 1); recurring role (season 2); 25 episodes
2001	The Fugitive	Nettie Beaumont	Episode: "Lagniappe"
2001–02	Leap Years	Athena Barnes	Main role
2003	Skin	Kimberly Banks	Recurring role
2004	According to Jim	Kitson	Recurring role (season 3)
2004	Kevin Hill	Brooke Mills	Episode: "Homework"
2004	The O.C.	Ms. Fisher	Episode: "The Way We Were"
2005	Charmed	Katya	Episode: "Little Box of Horrors"
2006	Bones	Rose Harding	Episode: "The Man in the Morgue"
2006	Smith	Agent Lowry	Episode: "Pilot"
2006	Kidnapped	Katherine	Episode: "Burn, Baby, Burn"
2006–07	ER	Courtney Brown	Recurring role (season 13)
2007	Shark	Dr. Connie Vasquez	Episode: "Strange Bedfellows"
2007–08	Gossip Girl	Laurel	Recurring role (seasons 1–2)
2009	CSI: Miami	Diane Reed	Episode: "Out of Time"
2009	The Good Wife	Tamara	Episode: "Unprepared"
2009	Too Late to Say Goodbye	Ann Roche	Television film
2010	FlashForward	Liz Kayson	Episode: "Course Correction"
2010–13	The Glades	Colleen Manus	Main role
2011	Naughty or Nice	Helen Purcell	Television film
2011–13	90210	Rachel Gray	Recurring role (season 4); guest role (season 5)
2012	Blue Bloods	CIA Anne Reynolds	Episode: "Risk and Reward"
2013	Emily Owens, M.D.	Diana Calder	Episode: "Emily and... the Love of Larping"
2013	Golden Boy	Louise Reed	Episode: "Longshot"
2013	Raising Hope	Agent Thompson	Episode: "Murder, She Hoped"
2014	Pretty Little Liars	Elizabeth Mainway	Episode: "Who's in the Box?"
2014	Witches of East End	Alex	Episodes: "Boogie Knight", "When a Mandragora Loves a Woman"
2014–19	Hawaii Five-0	Renee Grover	Guest and recurring role (seasons 4–10)
2015	Beautiful & Twisted	Det. Sgt. Gloria Mosley	Television film
2015	It Had to Be You	Pam Davis	Television film
2015	The Mysteries of Laura	Donna McKinney	Episode: "The Mystery of the Popped Pugilist"
2015	Bosch	Connie Irving	Episode: "Chapter Eight: High Low"
2015	How to Get Away with Murder	Amanda Winthrop	Episode: "Mama's Here Now"
2015	Devious Maids	Jacklyn Dussault	Recurring role (season 3)
2015	Jessica Jones	D.A. Samantha Reyes	Episode: "AKA Smile"
2016	Daredevil	D.A. Samantha Reyes	Recurring role (season 2)
2016	Ash vs Evil Dead	Linda Bates Emery	Main role
2016–2020	Blindspot	Ellen "Shepherd" Briggs	Main role; recurring and guest role (seasons 3–5); 34 episodes
2017	Younger	Donna	Episode: "A Close Shave"
2017–18	Lethal Weapon	Gina Santos	Recurring and guest role (season 2–3); 5 episodes
2018	Cagney and Lacey	Lacey	Television film
2020–23	Star Trek: Picard	Raffi Musiker	Main role; 28 episodes
2021	Pose	Ebony Alexander Jackson	Episode: "Take Me to Church"
2023	The Walking Dead: Dead City	Jones	Episode: "Old Acquaintances"
2025	You	Dr. Val	Episodes: "Blood Will Have Blood", "#JoeGoldberg"

=== Video games ===
Year	Title	Role
2004	Terminator 3: The Redemption	Various (voice)

=== Radio ===
Year	Title	Role
2021	Marvel's Wastelanders: Hawkeye	Bobbi Morse/Mockingbird

=== Theatre ===
Year	Title	Role	Notes
1990	The Constant Couple	Lady Lurewell	Red Heel Theatre; May 1990
1996	Getting Away with Murder	Charmaine	Broadhurst Theatre; March 17, 1996 – March 31, 1996
1997	900 Oneonta	Palace	Circle Repertory Company; September 5, 1997 – September 22, 1997
2002	The Violet Hour	Jessie Brewster	South Coast Repertory; November 8, 2002 – November 24, 2002
2009	The Dog in the Manger	Diana	Shakespeare Theatre Company; February 10, 2009 – March 29, 2009
