= Leap Years =

- Genre: Drama
- Created by: Ron Cowen; Daniel Lipman
- Starring: Bruno Campos; Garret Dillahunt; Nina Garbiras; David Julian Hirsh; Michelle Hurd
- Country of origin: United States
- Original language: English
- No. of seasons: 1
- No. of episodes: 20

Production
- Running time: 60 minutes
- Production company: Temple Street Productions

Original release
- Network: Showtime
- Release: July 29, 2001 – January 31, 2002

Leap Years is an American drama television series that aired on the Showtime cable network from July 29, 2001 until January 31, 2002. The show was created by Ron Cowen and Daniel Lipman, who had created the American version of the series Queer as Folk. It followed a group of friends in New York City. Set in the main in 2001, the show was uniquely structured as a series of flashbacks to 1993 and flashforwards to the then-near future 2008.

== Cast ==
- Bruno Campos as Joe Rivera
- Nina Garbiras as Beth Greenway
- Garret Dillahunt as Gregory Paget
- Michelle Hurd as Athena Barnes
- David Julian Hirsh as Josh Adler

== Episodes ==
No.	Title	Directed by	Written by	Original release date
1	"Pilot"	Unknown	Unknown	July 29, 2001
2	"Episode 2"	Unknown	Unknown	July 29, 2001
3	"Episode 3"	Unknown	Unknown	August 5, 2001
4	"Episode 4"	Unknown	Unknown	August 12, 2001
5	"Episode 5"	Unknown	Unknown	August 19, 2001
6	"Episode 6"	Unknown	Unknown	August 26, 2001
7	"Episode 7"	Unknown	Unknown	September 2, 2001
8	"Episode 8"	Unknown	Unknown	September 9, 2001
9	"Episode 9"	Unknown	Unknown	September 16, 2001
10	"Episode 10"	Unknown	Unknown	September 23, 2001
11	"Episode 11"	Unknown	Unknown	September 30, 2001
12	"Episode 12"	Unknown	Unknown	October 7, 2001
13	"Episode 13"	Unknown	Unknown	October 14, 2001
14	"Episode 14"	Unknown	Unknown	October 21, 2001
15	"Episode 15"	Unknown	Unknown	October 28, 2001
16	"Episode 16"	Unknown	Unknown	November 4, 2001
17	"Episode 17"	Unknown	Unknown	January 10, 2002
18	"Episode 18"	Unknown	Unknown	January 17, 2002
19	"Episode 19"	Unknown	Unknown	January 24, 2002
20	"Episode 20"	Unknown	Unknown	January 31, 2002
