= James Hong =

American actor (born 1929)

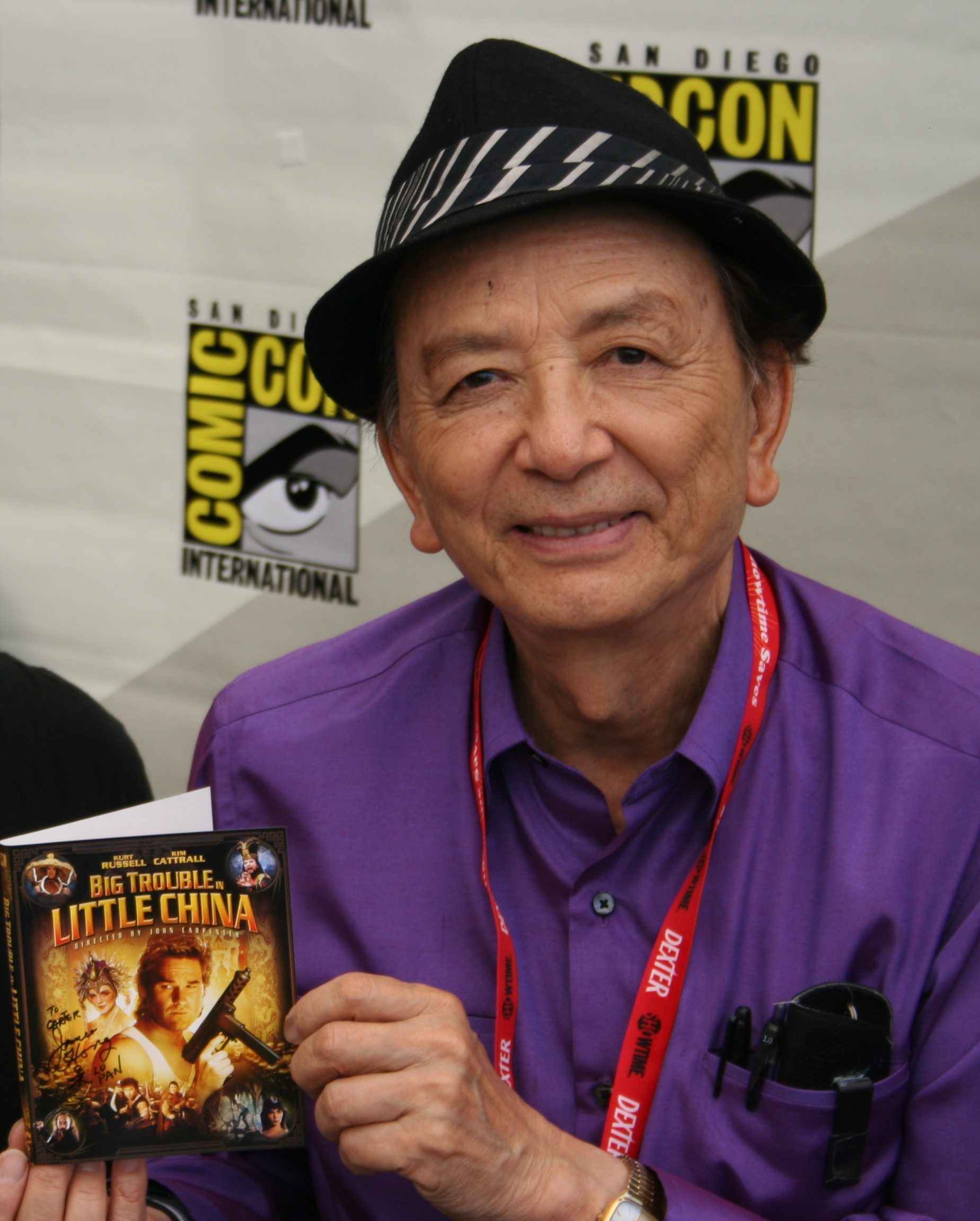
- Hong in 2011
- Born: February 22, 1929 (age 97); Minneapolis, Minnesota, U.S.
- Education: University of Southern California (BS)
- Occupations: Actor; producer; director
- Years active: 1954–present
- Spouses: Pearl Huang (m. 1967; div. 1973) Susan Tong (m. 1977)
- Children: 3
- Military service
- Service: Minnesota Army National Guard
- Service years: 1952–1953
- Rank: Staff Sergeant
- Unit: Armed Forces Radio Service
- Awards: Good Conduct Medal

Chinese name
- Traditional Chinese: 吳漢章
- Simplified Chinese: 吴汉章
Transcriptions
Standard Mandarin
- Hanyu Pinyin: Wú Hànzhāng
Yue: Cantonese
- Jyutping: Ng4 Hon3zoeng1

James Hong (born February 22, 1929) is an American actor, producer, and director. Known as one of the most prolific character actors in Hollywood history, he has worked in over 600 productions in American media since the Golden Age of Hollywood in the 1950s. In 2022, he received a star on the Hollywood Walk of Fame for his contributions to the American film and television industries.

Earlier in his career, Hong co-founded East West Players, the first Asian American theatre organization and the longest continuously running minority theatre in the United States, to increase Asian American representation in the industry. Hong became known to audiences through starring in the detective series The New Adventures of Charlie Chan (1957–1958), and appeared in numerous shows including Tombstone Territory 1958 Episode "Tong War", costarring wirh Richard Loo, Bonanza (1960), Perry Mason (1962–1963), The Man from U.N.C.L.E. (1965–1966), I Spy (1965–1967), Hawaii Five-O (1969–1974), and Kung Fu (1972–1975). He also guest-starred in numerous sitcoms including his memorable role as Bruce in the Seinfeld episode "The Chinese Restaurant" (1991).

Hong has appeared in both comedic and dramatic film roles, including Soldier of Fortune (1955), Flower Drum Song (1961), The Sand Pebbles (1966), Chinatown (1974) and its sequel The Two Jakes (1990), The In-Laws (1979), Airplane! (1980), True Confessions (1981), Blade Runner (1982), Big Trouble in Little China (1986), Wayne's World 2 (1993), Balls of Fury (2007), Safe (2012), and R.I.P.D. (2013). Hong gained newfound prominence and acclaim for his role as the elderly grandfather, Gong Gong, in the Academy Award–winning science fiction absurdist comedy film Everything Everywhere All at Once (2022), for which he earned a Screen Actors Guild Award alongside its ensemble.

As a voice actor, Hong's roles include Chi-Fu in Mulan (1998), Daolon Wong on the animated television series Jackie Chan Adventures (2002–2004), Professor Chang in Teen Titans (2003–2006), Mr. Ping in the Kung Fu Panda media franchise (2008–present), Zong Shi in Trollhunters: Rise of the Titans (2021), Father Level Bests in Wendell & Wild (2022), and Mr. Gao in Turning Red (2022).

== Early life and education ==
Hong was born on February 22, 1929, in Minneapolis, Minnesota, to Chinese emigrant parents Ng Fok Hong (吳福堂; aka Frank Wu Hong) and Lee Suey Far (李瑞花; aka Lee Shui Fa). His father emigrated from British Hong Kong to Chicago, Illinois, via Canada, and later moved to Minneapolis where he owned a restaurant and was leader of the local Hip Sing Tong. Hong's paternal grandfather was from Taishan.

For his early education, Hong relocated to Hong Kong, residing in Kowloon, before returning to the United States at the age of 10. During his upbringing, Hong mentioned being the only Asian student in a class of 500 children. Consequently, he experienced bullying and racism from classmates who singled him out as a foreigner and due to his limited proficiency in English. He graduated from Minneapolis Central High School. He first developed an interest in performing arts after watching Peking opera performers rehearse at his father's shop.

Hong studied civil engineering at the University of Minnesota, where he concentrated the majority of his free time on moving plates and fixing templates for the drill squad. While at the University of Minnesota, he joined the Minnesota Army National Guard. His university studies were interrupted when his national guard unit was mobilized during the Korean War and sent to Camp Rucker, Alabama for training.

== Military service ==
While in the Minnesota Army National Guard, Hong attended training in Alabama at Fort McClellan and Camp Rucker (now Fort Rucker) with the Special Services for 18 months from 1952 to 1953. After finishing his training for the day, he would entertain soldiers; upon witnessing Hong's performing prowess, the camp general asked Hong to stay and be in charge of the camp's live shows rather than deploy overseas.

Hong reflected on this experience and how it may have saved his life:

I do not know if I would have liked to go to war in Korea but let's admit it that with a G.I. cap and this face charging at the Korean army, the Koreans would try to kill me. But then if we were to retreat and I turned around and ran back the Americans would try to kill me too because they would think I am an enemy in disguise. I definitely think I would have been shot from one side and the other.

== Career ==
=== 1950s: Early career ===
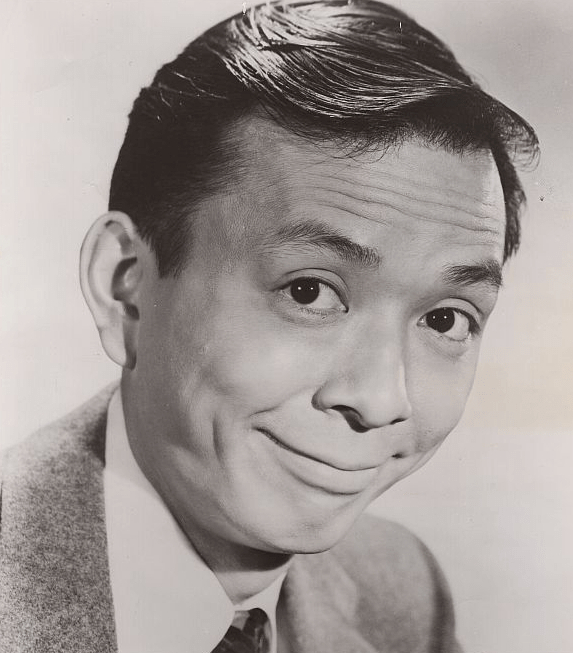
Hong as Barry Chan in The New Adventures of Charlie Chan, 1958

After the Korean War, Hong moved to Los Angeles in 1953 with a friend, where he would finish his degree at the University of Southern California. Hong soon began working full time as a road engineer for Los Angeles County during the day, while acting in the evenings, the weekends, and during his vacation and sick days. He eventually quit engineering for good, after five and a half years, to devote himself to acting and voice work full-time.

Hong has played over 600 television and film roles. His career in show business began in the 1950s during the final years of the Golden Age of Hollywood when he redubbed soundtracks of several Asian films. He dubbed the voices of characters Ogata (Akira Takarada) and Dr. Serizawa (Akihiko Hirata) in the 1956 film Godzilla, King of the Monsters!, as well as the title character in The Human Vapor.

In February 1954, Hong appeared on the radio and television game show You Bet Your Life with Groucho Marx. In this appearance, he did a number of impersonations including one of Groucho himself. Hong and his partner won $140 in the quiz. They contested the major prize of $2000 but did not win. The following year, he acted opposite Clark Gable in the war film Soldier of Fortune (1955). In 1956, Hong was cast as Jimmy Ling in the episode "Red Tentacles" of the Western aviation adventure series Sky King, starring Kirby Grant. He also guest-starred in the NBC Western series The Californians.

From 1957 to 1958, he was cast as the "Number One Son", Barry Chan, in the British-American series The New Adventures of Charlie Chan starring J. Carrol Naish as Charlie Chan. In an interview on CBS Sunday Morning, Hong revealed that Naish, in a racist outburst, had him fired from the series for missing only one line. Hong described Naish as a very prejudiced person and how Naish's actions were very hurtful to him. The role of the Number One Son was played by Keye Luke in the predecessor films. However, Keye Luke's character was known as Lee Chan.

In 1959, he appeared as a prince on an episode of Walt Disney's ABC series, Zorro. He was thereafter cast as Chung Lind in the 1960 episode "East of Danger" in the David Janssen NBC crime drama series Richard Diamond, Private Detective. From 1960 to 1962, he appeared four times on the ABC/Warner Brothers crime drama Hawaiian Eye, twice each on the ABC series Hong Kong and Adventures in Paradise, and once on ABC's related series, The Islanders.

=== 1960–1979 ===
Hong's first appearance as a host in a Chinese restaurant was in the Rodgers and Hammerstein film musical Flower Drum Song (1961). In 1962, he appeared on CBS's Perry Mason as Dean Chang in "The Case of the Weary Watchdog". On September 23, 1963, Hong hit the prime time slot playing spy Wen Lee in "The Hundred Days of the Dragon", the second episode of ABC's "The Outer Limits" first season. That year, Hong also played Louis Kew in "The Case of the Floating Stones". He also appeared three times on the NBC military sitcom Ensign O'Toole. In 1964, he appeared in an episode of Kentucky Jones. In 1965, Hong was one of the original founding members of the East West Players, an early Asian American theatre organization. Also in 1966, he played the bar owner Mr. Shu in The Sand Pebbles. Hong also appeared in several episodes of the original Hawaii Five-O.

Hong had a small part on a 1972 episode of CBS's The Bob Newhart Show. Hong then appeared as a host in a Chinese restaurant in the 1975 All in the Family episode "Edith Breaks Out". He was a frequent guest star on the 1972–1975 ABC television series Kung Fu, joined the cast on the final season of CBS's Switch, as Wang, and also played a flight attendant in the original 1979 film. He had a notable role as 'Dr. David Tao', a doctor accused of performing an illegal abortion in the Blake Edwards movie The Carey Treatment in 1972. He was also in the 1979 film The In-Laws.

=== 1980–1999 ===
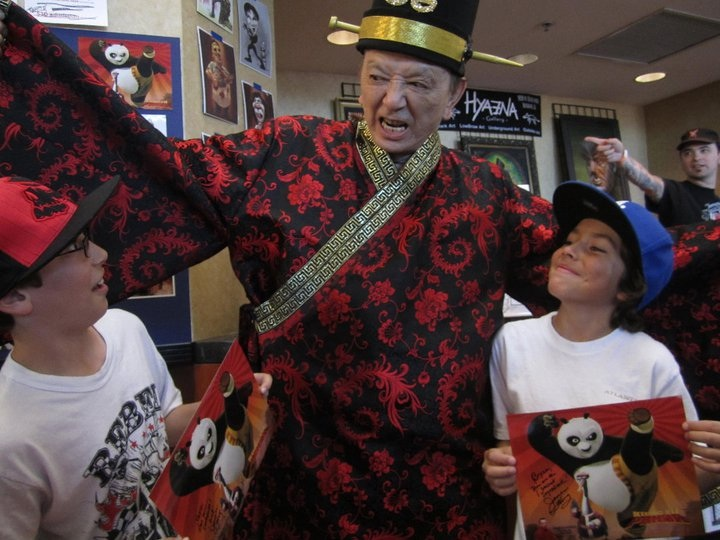
Hong with fans at Monsterpalooza in 2011

Hong appeared as a Japanese WWII officer in the 1980 comedy cult film Airplane!. He has also directed such films as Teen Lust. Hong played immortal ghost sorcerer Lo Pan in John Carpenter's cult classic Big Trouble in Little China (1986), eye manufacturer Chew in Blade Runner, Evelyn Mulwray's loyal and vigilant butler in Chinatown and The Two Jakes, and a low-rent private eye in Black Widow.

He also directed, wrote, and starred in the film The Vineyard (1989). Hong portrayed Chow Ting, a dry cleaner with the power to wash sins and guilt from a person's conscience, in the 1985 Tales from the Darkside episode "It All Comes Out in the Wash". Hong then appeared in a memorable role as Bruce, the host in a Chinese restaurant in Seinfeld episode "The Chinese Restaurant" (1991). Hong played Jeff Wong, Cassandra Wong's martial arts expert father, in the comedy sequel Wayne's World 2, and was featured as the head of the Scarred Foot society in the pilot for The Adventures of Brisco County, Jr. (1993). In 1994, he, his wife Susan, and daughter April appeared as a family riding mountain bikes beneath the Hollywood sign in the mountain-bike travel-adventure documentary, Full Cycle: A World Odyssey. Additionally, Hong guest-starred on Friends, playing Hoshi, the former paid assassin and boxing coach for Monica's boyfriend Pete (played by Jon Favreau) in the episode "The One with the Ultimate Fighting Champion".

Hong had a supporting role in the big-budget MGM film Red Corner in 1997, which starred Richard Gere. Hong also had a small role in the independent film Broken Vessels (1998). Hong played a villain in the season three episode of The X-Files entitled "Hell Money". Hong also voiced the character Daolon Wong, an evil wizard in the Jackie Chan Adventures television series, and was the voice of Chi-Fu in Disney's Mulan.

=== 2000–2019 ===
Hong appeared in several episodes of The Big Bang Theory during its first season, as well as in the "Color Blind" episode during the first season of Alias. He played the role of Mr. Takato in the movie Chasing Zoey, the final episode of Zoey 101. His character taught Michael Barret how to operate a manual transmission, and it was revealed at the end of the episode that he did not exist. He appeared in two episodes of The West Wing (Ep. 1.11; 3.15) as the Chinese Ambassador to the United States. He also played Mr. Soo on The King of Queens, an Asian restaurant owner again, who rents Doug Heffernan and his friends a loft apartment above his store, in the episode "Apartment Complex" (2006).

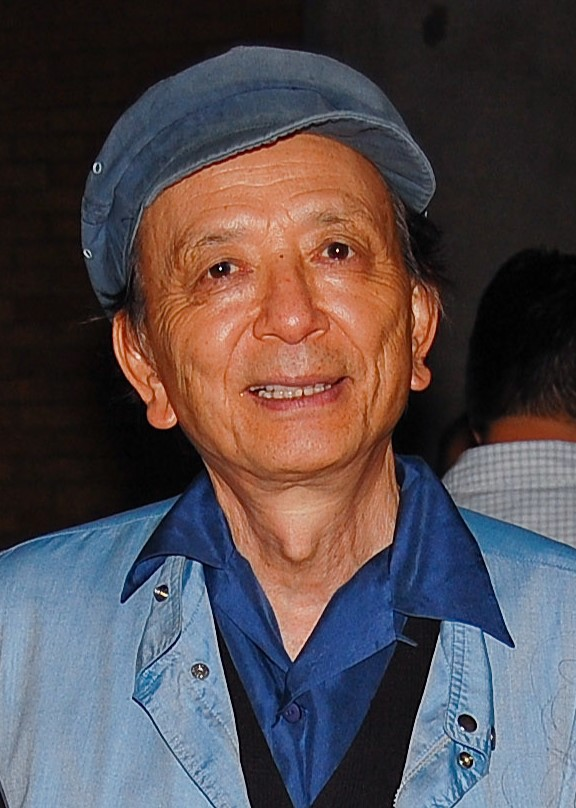
Hong in 2008

Hong's other roles included A.N.T. Farm, Mandarin in Super Robot Monkey Team Hyperforce Go!, and Professor Chang in Teen Titans. He made a cameo appearance on the television series Las Vegas as a presumed cheating monk. Hong also lent his voice to the Cartoon Network animation Chowder as Mung Daal's mentor in the "Won-Ton Bombs" episode. In 2006, Hong voiced the character Mayor Tong in Avatar: The Last Airbender in the second season's episode titled "Avatar Day" in addition to his previous role as Monk Tashi in the first-season episode "The Storm" in 2005. In 2006, he also voiced the character of the High Lama in the film Chill Out, Scooby-Doo!.

Hong's voice also appeared as Colonel Zhou Peng in the video game Mercenaries: Playground of Destruction, Dr. Chang in Def Jam Icon (2007), Ancient Wu in True Crime: Streets of LA, and reprising his role as Chew in the Blade Runner video game. His later appearances were in the films Balls of Fury and The Day the Earth Stood Still. In 2008, he voiced Mr. Ping in Kung Fu Panda, the adoptive father of Po, and was nominated for an Annie Award for his performance; he later reprised the role on Kung Fu Panda Holiday Special and won an Annie Award for Voice Acting in a Television Production; he and Lucy Liu have collaborated in the feature film series and in the television series adaptation, Kung Fu Panda: Legends of Awesomeness. After the release of the third film, he stated that he hoped to continue in the role, though due to his advanced age he wanted the filmmakers to start work on it quickly. He would reprise the role again for the subsequent streaming series Kung Fu Panda: The Paws of Destiny and Kung Fu Panda: The Dragon Knight, as well as in Kung Fu Panda 4. In 2015, Hong voiced Azmorigan on Star Wars Rebels as well as the Sugi arms dealer Endente in an unfinished four-part story arc of Star Wars: The Clone Wars; the rough animatics of which were posted on the Star Wars website.

He appeared in the film Safe (2012). He also provides the voices for the jeweler NPC Covetous Shen in Diablo III, the "fisherman" NPC Shi Yugong in Diablo IV, Master Bruised Paw in World of Warcraft: Mists of Pandaria, Bucky (for two episodes) from the television series Archer, and Uncle Po in Sleeping Dogs. In 2013, he appeared as Ogisan, the gift shop keeper from the Incredible Crew sketch "Magical Video Game Controller" alongside Jeremy Shada and Shauna Case. He also appeared in the film R.I.P.D. (2013). In 2014, he voiced the character Ho Chan in the 2012 3D animated cartoon Teenage Mutant Ninja Turtles, a clear parody of his character in Big Trouble in Little China, David Lo Pan.

Hong guest-starred in a 2015 episode of Agents of S.H.I.E.L.D. as the father of Melinda May, played by Ming-Na Wen, with whom he co-starred in Mulan. In 2018, it was announced that he was producing a feature screenplay about a grandfather and his estranged granddaughter who realize, through an unexpected adventure that pushes them into another world, that family relationships are the key to survival. Later it was revealed that the film's title is Patsy Lee & the Keepers of the 5 Kingdoms, directed by Zack Ward, starring Michelle Fang.

=== 2020s–present ===
Hong appears in the A24 film Everything Everywhere All at Once, which was released on March 25, 2022. He won the Screen Actors Guild Award for Outstanding Performance by a Cast in a Motion Picture with the film's ensemble. At the ceremony, he earned praise and media attention for his acceptance speech where he highlighted the lack of positive Asian representation in American cinema when he started his acting career over 70 years ago when he first got his Screen Actors Guild card. He noted his first film was with Clark Gable and that oftentimes actors portraying Asian Americans would have prosthetics and offensive accents. Hong stated, "Back in those days, I have to tell you this, the leading roles were played by these guys with their eyes taped up...and the producers said that Asians were not good enough, and they are not box office. But, look at us now!". He attended the 2023 Academy Awards ceremony, where the film received 7 Oscars from 11 nominations, wearing a bow tie with googly eyes. Hong voiced Grandpa Wing in the animated series Gremlins: Secrets of the Mogwai, released on Max in 2023.

== Personal life ==
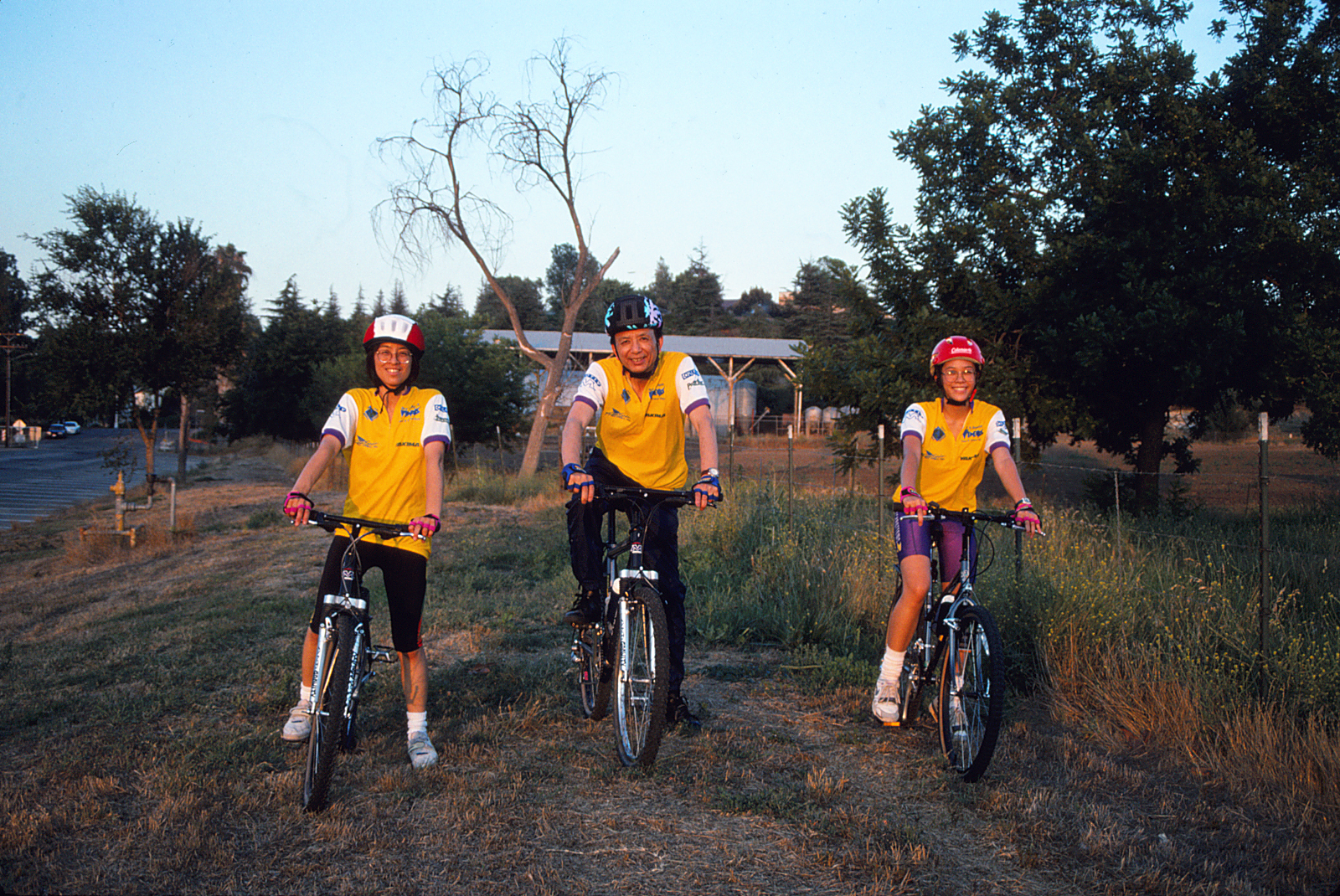
Hong with his wife and daughter in Hollywood, 1994

Hong lives in Los Angeles, California, with his wife Susan Tong, whom he married in 1977. The couple has three daughters and eight grandchildren.

Hong is a Presbyterian; he attended the Westminster Presbyterian Church with his family as a child in Minneapolis.

In 2020, Daniel Dae Kim started a GoFundMe campaign to get Hong a star on the Hollywood Walk of Fame. He received a star as a member of the 2022 class of honorees, becoming the oldest person to receive the honor at age 93.

== Filmography ==
Selected filmography

- Soldier of Fortune (1955)
- Love Is a Many-Splendored Thing (1955)
- Godzilla, King of the Monsters! (1956)
- Flower Drum Song (1961)
- The Sand Pebbles (1966)
- The Bamboo Saucer (1968)
- Colossus: The Forbin Project (1970)
- The Carey Treatment (1972)
- Chinatown (1974)
- Bound for Glory (1976)
- The In-Laws (1979)
- Airplane! (1980)
- True Confessions (1981)
- Blade Runner (1982)
- Breathless (1983)
- Missing in Action (1984)
- Big Trouble in Little China (1986)
- Revenge of the Nerds II: Nerds in Paradise (1987)
- Black Widow (1987)
- The Two Jakes (1990)
- The Perfect Weapon (1991)
- Wayne's World 2 (1993)
- The Shadow (1994)
- Mulan (1998)
- Def Jam: Icon (2007)
- Balls of Fury (2007)
- The Day the Earth Stood Still (2008)
- Kung Fu Panda (2008)
- Kung Fu Panda 2 (2011)
- Safe (2012)
- R.I.P.D. (2013)
- Kung Fu Panda 3 (2016)
- Sherlock Gnomes (2018)
- Turning Red (2022)
- Everything Everywhere All at Once (2022)
- Wendell & Wild (2022)
- Kung Fu Panda 4 (2024)
- The Keepers of the 5 Kingdoms (2024)

== Awards and nominations ==
Year	Association	Category	Project	Result	Ref.
2009	Annie Awards	Best Voice Acting in an Animated Feature	Kung Fu Panda	Nominated	
2011	Annie Awards	Best Voice Acting in a Television Production	Kung Fu Panda Holiday	Won	
2012	Annie Awards	Best Voice Acting in an Animated Feature	Kung Fu Panda 2	Nominated	
2012	Daytime Emmy Award	Outstanding Performer in an Animated Program	Kung Fu Panda: Legends of Awesomeness	Nominated	
2022	Screen Actors Guild Award	Outstanding Ensemble in a Motion Picture	Everything Everywhere All at Once	Won	
2022	Hollywood Critics Association	Best Cast Ensemble	Everything Everywhere All at Once	Won	
2022	Star on the Hollywood Walk of Fame			Received	

== Sources ==
- Pilato, Herbie J. (1993). The Kung Fu Book of Caine: The Complete Guide to TV's First Mystical Eastern Western. Boston: Charles A. Tuttle. ISBN 0-8048-1826-6.
