= Matthew Sato =

American actor (born 2001)

- Born: Matthew Keoni Sato; April 19, 2001 (age 25); Oʻahu, Hawaii, U.S.
- Other name: Matt Sato
- Occupations: Actor, singer
- Years active: 2015–present

Matthew Keoni Sato (born April 19, 2001) is an American actor and singer. He began his career in the Brat web series Chicken Girls (2018–2020). On television, he is known for his role in the Disney+ series Doogie Kameāloha, M.D. (2021–2023). His films include The Keepers of the 5 Kingdoms and Imaginary (both 2024).

== Early life ==
Sato almost took a career in dentistry before shifting to acting full time. He moved to Los Angeles in 2017 to further his career. He is of Japanese, Hawaiian, Chinese, and Irish descent.

== Career ==
He started his career in local theater and modeling before shifting into acting. He made his debut in a 2015 episode of the CBS series Hawaii Five-0. Initially credited as Matt Sato, he began appearing on the Brat network in 2018 when he joined the cast of the web series Chicken Girls as Robby Robbins. He would reprise his role as Robby in the film Intern-in-Chief and The Attaway Appeal Podcast. Sato starred in the 2020 Snap Original series Save Me alongside Mikey Murphy and Daniela Nieves. Sato also returned to television with a recurring role as Spenders in the Nickelodeon series Side Hustle.

In 2021, Sato had his first main television role as Kai Kameāloha in the Disney+ series Doogie Kameāloha, M.D., a role that he considered to have "depth and complexity". The series also allowed him to return to his hometown in Hawaii. He also joined the recurring cast of the Peacock series Saved by the Bell for its second season as Gil Vatooley. The next year, he appeared as Brandon in the second season of the ABC series Grown-ish.

Sato had a recurring role as Mack Alana in the fourth and final season of High School Musical: The Musical: The Series on Disney+ in 2023. Sato made his feature film debut in 2024 as Hopper in the fantasy film The Keepers of the 5 Kingdoms with Michelle Mao and Liam in the Blumhouse Productions horror film Imaginary.

== Filmography ==
=== Film ===
Year	Title	Role	Notes
2018	Ghosts		Short film
2019	Dark Thoughts	Junior	Short film
2020	It Counts	Student	Short film
2024	The Keepers of the 5 Kingdoms	Hopper	
2024	Imaginary	Liam	
2025	Don't Trip	Dev	
2027	Jason	Lucas	Post-production

=== Television ===
Year	Title	Role	Notes
2015	Hawaii Five-0	Boy #1	Episode: "Pono Kaulike"
2020–2021	Side Hustle	Spenders	Recurring role (season 1)
2021	Chad	Evan Baxter	Episode: "Finale"
2021	Saved by the Bell	Gil Vatooley	Recurring role (season 2)
2021–2023	Doogie Kameāloha, M.D.	Kai Kameāloha	Main role
2022	Deadly Cheer Mom	Grant	Television film
2022	NCIS	Zack Taylor	Episode: "The Brat Pack"
2022	Grown-ish	Brandon	4 episodes
2023	High School Musical: The Musical: The Series	Mack Alana	Recurring (Season 4)
2025	Buffy the Vampire Slayer: New Sunnydale	Jack	TV Pilot
2027	Untamed	Kaden Burkart	Recurring role (season 2)

=== Web ===
Year	Title	Role	Notes
2018–2020	Chicken Girls	Robby Robbins	Main role (season 2–5); recurring role (season 6)
2019	Intern-in-Chief	Robby Robbins	Brat TV film
2020	Solve	Alex	Episode: "Death in Sex Ed"
2020	Save Me	Jason	Main role
