= List of 2018 box office number-one films in Belgium =

This is a list of films which placed number-one at the weekend box office in Belgium during 2018. Amounts are in American dollars.

#	Weekend end date	Film	Box office
1	January 7, 2018	Star Wars: The Last Jedi	$1,050,613
2	January 14, 2018	Star Wars: The Last Jedi	$349,465
3	January 21, 2018	Star Wars: The Last Jedi	$214,001
4	January 28, 2018	Star Wars: The Last Jedi	$126,413
5	February 4, 2018	Maze Runner: The Death Cure	$978,492
6	February 11, 2018	Fifty Shades Freed	$1,572,567
7	February 18, 2018	Black Panther	$1,234,874
8	February 25, 2018	Black Panther	$517,040
9	March 4, 2018	Red Sparrow	$455,763
10	March 11, 2018	Red Sparrow	$372,959
11	March 18, 2018	Red Sparrow	$263,527
12	March 25, 2018	Pacific Rim: Uprising	$200,920
13	April 1, 2018	Peter Rabbit	$360,425
14	April 8, 2018	Peter Rabbit	$535,239
15	April 15, 2018	Peter Rabbit	$436,205
16	April 22, 2018	Peter Rabbit	$36,847
17	April 29, 2018	Avengers: Infinity War	$1,854,939
18	May 6, 2018	Avengers: Infinity War	$683,729
19	May 13, 2018	Avengers: Infinity War	$895,095
20	May 20, 2018	Avengers: Infinity War	$260,874
21	May 27, 2018	Solo: A Star Wars Story	$438,687
22	June 3, 2018	Solo: A Star Wars Story	$297,118
23	June 10, 2018	Solo: A Star Wars Story	$164,274
24	June 17, 2018	Jurassic World: Fallen Kingdom	$761,081
25	June 24, 2018	Jurassic World: Fallen Kingdom	$588,081
26	July 1, 2018	Incredibles 2	$505,411
27	July 8, 2018	Incredibles 2	$468,281
28	July 15, 2018	Incredibles 2	$393,148
29	July 22, 2018	Mamma Mia! Here We Go Again	$352,992
30	July 29, 2018	Hotel Transylvania 3: Summer Vacation	$358,594
31	August 5, 2018	Mission: Impossible – Fallout	$871,750
32	August 12, 2018	Mission: Impossible – Fallout	$484,179
33	August 19, 2018	The Equalizer 2	$321,740
34	August 26, 2018	Hotel Transylvania 3: Summer Vacation	$248,606
35	September 2, 2018	Hotel Transylvania 3: Summer Vacation	$251,993
36	September 9, 2018	Mission: Impossible – Fallout	$127,078
37	September 16, 2018	Peppermint	$125,613
38	September 23, 2018	BlacKkKlansman	$222,543
39	September 30, 2018	A Simple Favor	$369,609
40	October 7, 2018	The Predator	$215,010
41	October 14, 2018	Venom	$681,019
42	October 21, 2018	Venom	$418,137
43	October 28, 2018	Venom	$278,463
44	November 4, 2018	Bohemian Rhapsody	$852,058
45	November 11, 2018	The Nutcracker and the Four Realms	$202,630
46	November 18, 2018	The Nutcracker and the Four Realms	$115,978
47	November 25, 2018	The Grinch	$184,458
48	December 2, 2018	The Grinch	$539,462
49	December 9, 2018	The Grinch	$449,578
50	December 16, 2018	Ralph Breaks the Internet	$297,946
51	December 23, 2018	Mary Poppins Returns	$524,579
52	December 30, 2018	Mary Poppins Returns	$711,559

== Highest-grossing films ==
Highest-grossing films of 2018
Rank	Title	Distributor	Domestic gross
1	Jurassic World: Fallen Kingdom	Universal	$5,751,344
2	Avengers: Infinity War	Disney	$5,654,123
3	Incredibles 2	Disney	$5,089,059
4	Fifty Shades Freed	Sony	$4,887,249
5	Jumanji: Welcome to the Jungle	Sony	$4,583,142
6	Black Panther	Disney	$3,851,510
7	The Grinch	Universal	$3,752,087
8	Hotel Transylvania 3: Summer Vacation	Sony	$3,728,689
9	Maze Runner: The Death Cure	Fox	$3,383,083
10	Deadpool 2	Fox	$3,283,308
