= Zi (film) =

2026 film by Kogonada

- Theatrical release poster
- Directed by: Kogonada
- Written by: Kogonada
- Produced by: Chung An; Christopher Radcliff; Benjamin Loeb; Kogonada; Haley Lu Richardson; Michelle Mao; Jin Ha
- Starring: Michelle Mao; Haley Lu Richardson; Jin Ha
- Cinematography: Benjamin Loeb
- Edited by: Kogonada
- Music by: Ryuichi Sakamoto
- Distributed by: Grasshopper Film
- Release dates: January 24, 2026 (Sundance); November 6, 2026 (United States)
- Running time: 99 minutes
- Country: United States
- Languages: English; Cantonese; Mandarin

Zi (stylized as zi) is a 2026 American experimental drama film edited, produced, written and directed by Kogonada, starring Michelle Mao, Haley Lu Richardson, and Jin Ha. It premiered at the 2026 Sundance Film Festival.

== Premise ==
In Hong Kong, a young woman haunted by visions of her future self meets a stranger who changes the course of her night — and possibly her life.

== Cast ==
- Michelle Mao as Zi
- Haley Lu Richardson as Elle
- Jin Ha as Min

== Production ==
The film was shot on location in Hong Kong over three weeks in October 2025. Tired of the logistics and meetings associated with big-budget productions he had experienced on his last film, A Big Bold Beautiful Journey (2025), Kogonada assembled as small a cast and crew as possible, with the intention of shooting spontaneously and with little script prepared.

The initial team consisted of seven people: Kogonada, the three actors, cinematographer Benjamin Loeb (who had shot the director's two previous films), and producers Christopher Radcliff and Chung An. In an interview with IndieWire, Kogonada said, "The invitation was, 'Hey, let's all meet in Hong Kong, we all have to pay for ourselves. Let's just meet there and let's create something together and let's do it for a few weeks.'" Prior to filming, he recommended that Richardson watch Chungking Express (1994), also set in Hong Kong; she later suggested a blonde wig for her character as an homage to Brigitte Lin's character in the film.

The team spent just three days on pre-production after arriving. Loeb often shot in locations the day after finding them during location scouting, with Kogonada calling the process "liberating". A week after filming ended, the director produced a rough edit that was submitted to Sundance Film Festival. The seven members are all credited as producers, with each receiving equal equity if the film is sold to a distribution company.

Zi features compositions by the Japanese composer Ryuichi Sakamoto, to whom the film is also dedicated.

== Release ==
Zi had its world premiere at the 2026 Sundance Film Festival on January 24, 2026. It is Kogonada's third film to play at the festival. In June 2026, Grasshopper Film acquired distribution rights to the film, and scheduled a November 6, 2026, release.

== Reception ==
On the review aggregator website Rotten Tomatoes, 63% of 30 critics' reviews are positive, with an average rating of 5.9/10. Metacritic, which uses a weighted average, assigned the film a score of 67 out of 100, based on 10 critics, indicating "generally favorable" reviews.

Critics considered it an improvement over Kogonada's previous film, A Big Bold Beautiful Journey, which received mixed reviews. Variety's Guy Lodge wrote, "Coming swiftly on that film's heels, Kogonoda's fourth feature Zi feels a clear attempt at course-correction: a jagged, mood-driven miniature, sharing his debut's fascination with urban geography and loudly ambient silence." In a review for Vulture, Bilge Ebiri wrote, "It feels as if Kogonada has finally unleashed all his suppressed formalist energy. The movie feels like a release valve, an artiste's penance. ... The film finds itself through texture: rushed shots of late-night alleyways, wide-angles of office buildings, city lights reflected through water onto the actors’ faces. ... Shot partly on 16mm film, often at night, the heavy grain of the images begins to feel like a memory."

Some criticism was directed at the thinness of its narrative, with Ebiri writing, "Zi is at its weakest when it attempts conventional development and incident, and it doesn't feel like Kogonada's heart is in such exchanges either." The Hollywood Reporter's David Rooney said, "The customary warmth and gentleness of Kogonada's approach and the corresponding delicacy of the three actors makes you keep wishing Zi would build more substance, more lingering poignancy instead of wafting along on its cloud of melancholy with characters that lack dimension."
