= Kogonada =

American filmmaker

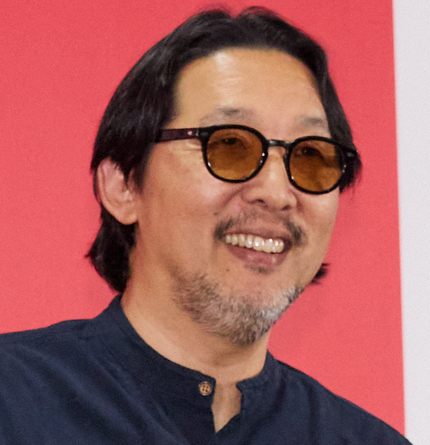
- Kogonada in 2025
- Born: 박중은 | Park Joong Eun; Seoul, South Korea
- Occupations: Video essayist, filmmaker
- Years active: 2012–present
- Children: 2
- Website: kogonada.com

Park Joong Eun (Korean: 박중은), known professionally as Kogonada, is an American filmmaker. After first gaining recognition for his video essays that analyze the content, form, and structure of various films and television series, he has become best known for writing and directing the feature films Columbus (2017), After Yang (2021), and A Big Bold Beautiful Journey (2025). His accolades include a Sundance Film Festival Best Film award as well as nominations for the Cannes Film Festival and the British Academy Film Awards.

== Early life, family and education ==
Kogonada was born in Seoul. He immigrated from South Korea as a child and was raised in Indiana and Chicago.

== Career ==
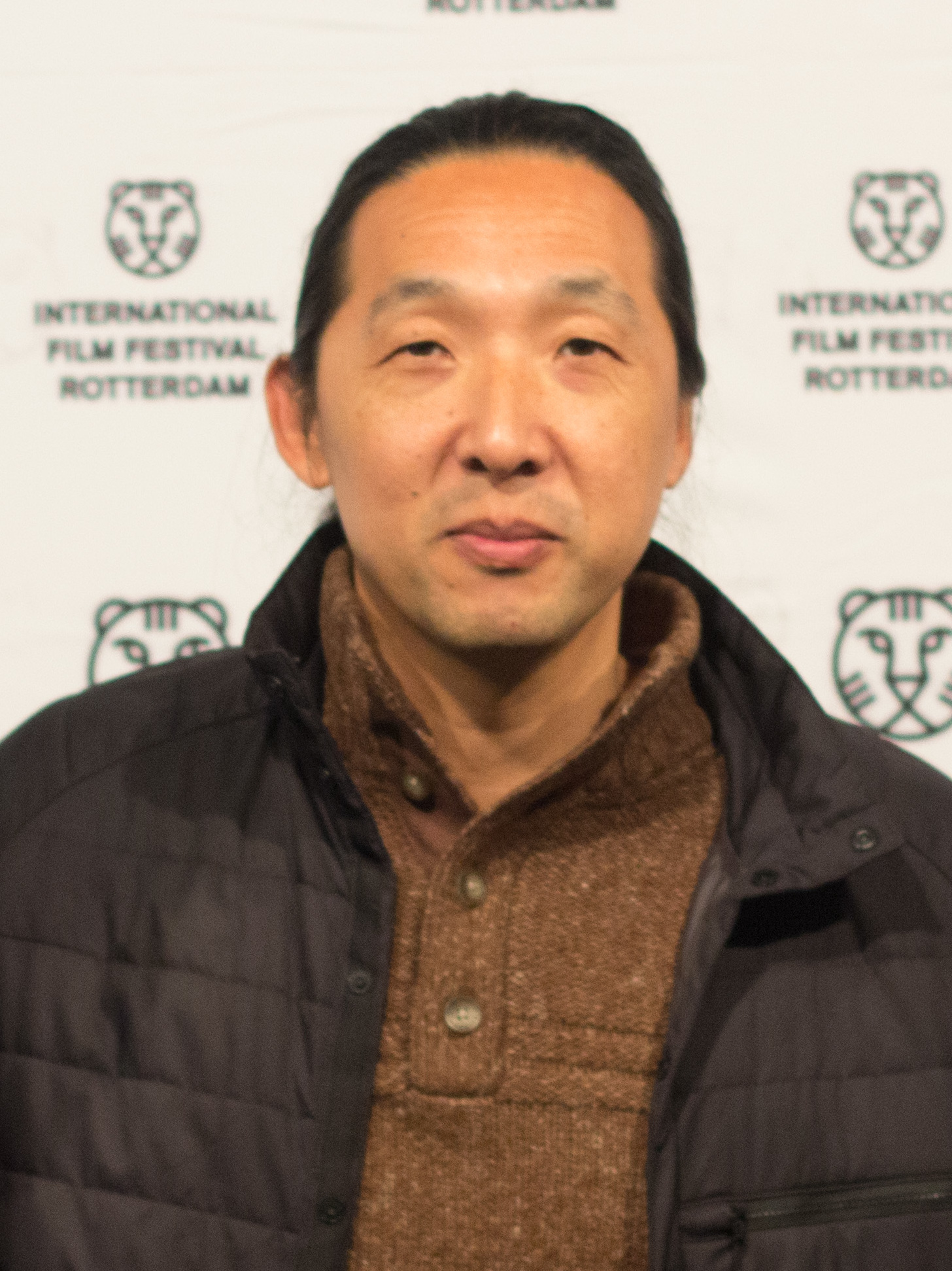
Kogonada in 2017

Kogonada posted his first video essay in January 2012. Using clips from the American television series Breaking Bad, the video displays the series' use of numerous point-of-view shots from unusual angles and objects. Kogonada was inspired to create the video essay while he watched the series, noticing a recurring visual aesthetic used throughout the series. In February 2013, he was commissioned by the British Film Institute to create a video essay on the films of Hirokazu Kore-eda for their publication Sight & Sound. He subsequently did additional commissioned work for Sight & Sound as well as for The Criterion Collection, Samsung, and the Lincoln Motor Company. In March 2016, Kogonada was part of the official jury for the 16th LPA Film Festival at the Canary Islands, Spain, where he taught a master class and had screenings for 14 of his video essays at the "Bande à part" section.

His feature directorial debut was Columbus (2017), which premiered at the Sundance Film Festival before receiving a limited theatrical release by the Sundance Institute on August 11, 2017. He also wrote and edited the film. The film received wide acclaim from critics and garnered nominations at the Independent Spirit Awards and Gotham Independent Film Awards.

Kogonada next wrote, edited, and directed the science fiction film After Yang (2021), which had its world premiere at the Cannes Film Festival and its North American premiere at the Sundance Film Festival, where it won the Alfred P. Sloan Prize. The film was favorably received by critics and in 2024 was named the 9th best science fiction film of the 21st century by IndieWire.

In 2022, Kogonada directed four episodes of the first season of Pachinko, which garnered several accolades, including a Peabody Award and a Critics' Choice Award. He continued his television work by directing two episodes of the Star Wars television series The Acolyte (2024). He has also been tapped to direct a limited series about Vincent Chin, with Chloé Zhao executive producing.

Kogonada directed the romantic fantasy film A Big Bold Beautiful Journey (2025) from a screenplay by Seth Reiss. The film, released in the United States September 19, 2025, stars Margot Robbie and Colin Farrell. It received negative reviews and under performed at the box office.

In September 2025, Kogonada served as a member of the Competition Jury at the 30th Busan International Film Festival.

Kogonada wrote and directed the experimental drama film Zi (2026), which stars Michelle Mao, Haley Lu Richardson, and Jin Ha. It premiered at the 2026 Sundance Film Festival.

== Technique ==
Kogonada's video essays typically showcase a particular theme or aesthetic regularly used by a filmmaker either throughout a filmography or within a single work. Some examples are his three video essays on the aesthetics of American director Wes Anderson, who is known for using unusually symmetrical framing in his films.

His video essays are formed through the juxtaposition of images, conveying thoughts through a particular arrangement of clips. In an interview for Nashville Scene in March 2015, Kogonada likened creating video essays with preparing sushi: "With sushi, every cut matters. And so do the ingredients. Those two ongoing choices are the difference. What you select, and how you cut it." In comparing written essays with visual essays, Kogonada noted how words form precise observations of ideas, while visuals could convey a particular idea without providing a definite explanation. He explained that "[i]f you want to delve deep into theory, texts are the perfect medium .... However, when I'm making visual essays, I treat words as supplementary."

== Pseudonym ==
Kogonada took his pseudonym from Kogo Noda, a frequent screenwriter of Yasujirō Ozu's films. He explained to Filmmaker:

I like Chris Marker's idea about your work being your work. I’ve also never identified much with my American name, which always feels a little strange to see or hear ... And I'm quite fond of heteronyms.

In a 2018 interview with the Financial Times, Kogonada stated:

If I'm honest, the pseudonym was about being an Asian-American too. There is something about being an immigrant in America and having the power to name yourself.

== Filmography ==
=== Film ===
Year	Title	Director	Writer	Editor	Notes
2017	Columbus	Yes	Yes	Yes	
2021	After Yang	Yes	Yes	Yes	
2025	A Big Bold Beautiful Journey	Yes	No	No	Also executive producer
2026	Zi	Yes	Yes	Yes	Also producer

=== Television ===
Year	Title	Director	Executive producer	Notes
2022	Pachinko	Yes	Yes	4 episodes
2024	The Acolyte	Yes	No	2 episodes

== Accolades ==
Year	Award	Category	Title	Result
2021	Cannes Film Festival	Un Certain Regard Award	After Yang	Nominated
2022	Peabody Awards	Entertainment	Pachinko	Won
2022	Gotham Awards	Breakthrough Series - Longform	Pachinko	Won
2022	Sundance Film Festival	Alfred P. Sloan Best Feature Film	After Yang	Won
2022	Boston Society of Film Critics Awards	Best Adapted Screenplay	After Yang	Won
2023	British Academy Film Awards	Best International TV Series	Pachinko	Nominated

== Literature ==
- Thomas Elsaesser, Malte Hagener, Film Theory: An Introduction through the Senses, 2nd, Routledge, 2015, 246 p; ISBN 1317581148, ISBN 9781317581147.
- For the Love of Cinema: Teaching Our Passion In and Outside the Classroom / Rashna Wadia Richards, David T. Johnson, Indiana University Press, 2017, p. 185; ISBN 0253030129, ISBN 9780253030122.
