= Surfside Girls =

American adventure streaming series

- Promotional poster
- Genre: Family drama; Mystery; Adventure
- Based on: Surfside Girls by Kim Dwinell
- Written by: May Chan; Alex Diaz; Julie Sagalowsky Diaz
- Directed by: America Young
- Starring: Miya Cech; YaYa Gosselin
- Country of origin: United States
- Original language: English

Production
- Executive producers: May Chan; Paul Stupin; Lydia Antonini; Alex Diaz; Julie Sagalowsky Diaz; America Young; Paul Davidson; Jeff Brustrom
- Production companies: Banzaifly; Sterling Chan Productions; Pirates' Cove Entertainment; Endeavor Content; IDW Entertainment

Original release
- Network: Apple TV+
- Release: August 19, 2022

Surfside Girls is an American children's adventure mystery television series based on IDW Publishing's graphic novels of the same name by Kim Dwinell. The series follows best friends Jade (Miya Cech) and Sam (YaYa Gosselin), who seek to solve a ghost mystery. It premiered on August 19, 2022 on Apple TV+.

== Synopsis ==
Jade and Sam, best friends, are ready to enjoy their summer surfing in the sun. When they are confronted by a ghost, the two learn of a mystery involving a pirate ship and a cursed treasure rumored to be hidden beneath Surfside's famed Danger Point bluff. Sam seeks to assist a pirate spirit named Remi in removing the curse after meeting him, while Jade is keen to establish a scientific explanation for ghosts. Sam and Jade have to mix their diverse perspectives in reasoning and creativity to uncover the truth. They are determined to piece together the evidence, discover the truth, and protect Surfside as a whole.

== Cast ==
=== Main ===
- Miya Cech as Jade Lee
- YaYa Gosselin as Samantha 'Sam' Torres
- Spencer Hermes-Rebello as Remington 'Remi' Augustus van Roberts

=== Recurring ===
- Adan Maverick Carcano as Petey
- Camille Dragomer as Francesca
- Logan Gray as Miles
- Christine Lin as Mei-Lin
- Michelle Mao as Amy
- Joseph Mesiano as Captain Devar
- Catia Ojeda as Monica
- Jacob Vargas as Bob
- Steven Chan as Fong
- Sonita Henry as Dr. Olympia Pfeiffer
- Victoria Blade as Kimber
- Amber Martinez as Lady Surfside

== Episodes ==
No. overall	No. in series	Title	Directed by	Written by	Original release date
1	1	"And the Secret of Danger Point"	Unknown	Unknown	August 19, 2022
2	2	"And the Untold Story of the Obsidian Flyer"	Unknown	Unknown	August 19, 2022
3	3	"And the Lady of Surfside"	Unknown	Unknown	August 19, 2022
4	4	"And the Promise of Peligro"	Unknown	Unknown	August 19, 2022
5	5	"And the Weathered Storm"	Unknown	Unknown	August 19, 2022
6	6	"And the Day of the Flying Saucer"	Unknown	Unknown	August 19, 2022
7	7	"And Jade's Journey"	Unknown	Unknown	August 19, 2022
8	8	"And Sam's Story"	Unknown	Unknown	August 19, 2022
9	9	"And the Cursed Treasure"	Unknown	Unknown	August 19, 2022
10	10	"And the Showdown at Danger Point"	Unknown	Unknown	August 19, 2022

== Background ==
In December 2021, Apple TV+ ordered 10 episodes of Surfside Girls, based on IDW Publishing's graphic novels of the same name by Kim Dwinell. Miya Cech and YaYa Gosselin were cast in the lead roles. Other crew members included writer, executive producer and showrunner May Chan; executive producers Paul Stupin, Lydia Antonini, Paul Davidson, and Jeff Brustrom; writers and executive producers Alex Diaz and Julie Sagalowsky Diaz; and the first two episode's director and writer America Young. In May 2022, Christine Lin and Catia Ojeda was reportedly cast in a recurring role.

== Release ==
Surfside Girls premiered on August 19, 2022, on Apple TV+.
