= Miyako (actress) =

American actress (born 2007)

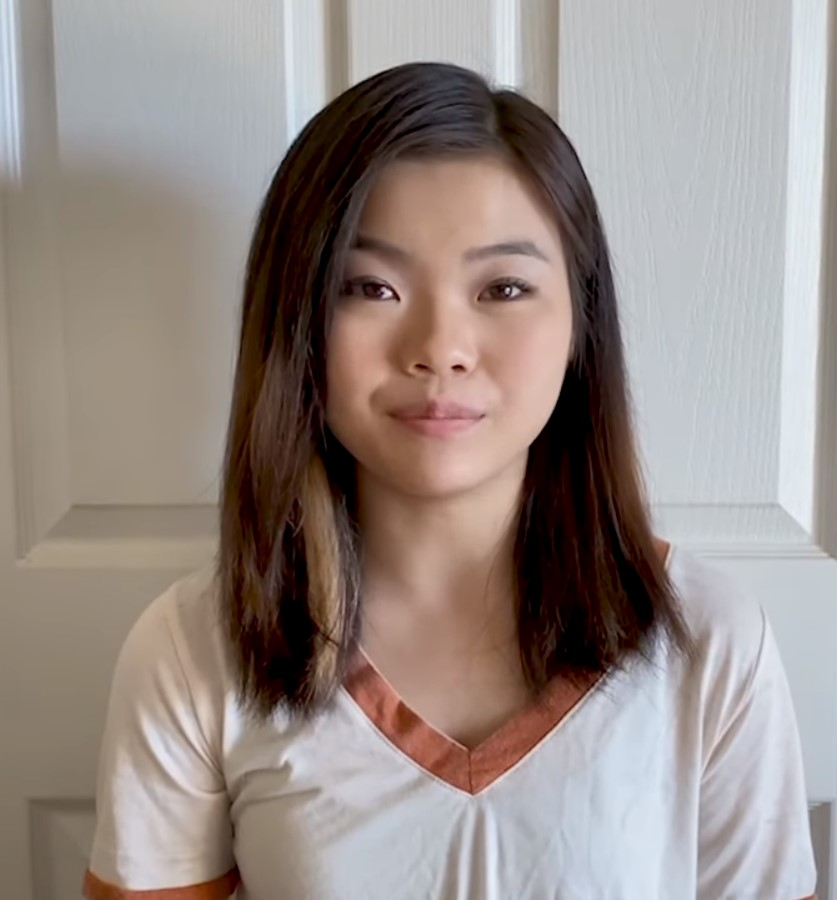
- Miyako in 2021
- Born: March 4, 2007 (age 19); Tokyo, Japan
- Citizenship: United States
- Occupation: Actress
- Years active: 2015–present

Miyako (born March 4, 2007), originally known as Miya Cech, is an American actress. She made her film debut in The Darkest Minds (2018). She then starred in Rim of the World (2019), the second revival of Are You Afraid of the Dark? (2019), The Astronauts (2020–21) and Marvelous and the Black Hole (2021). She also portrays Toph Beifong in the Netflix series Avatar: The Last Airbender (2026–present).

== Early life ==
Miyako, who is of Chinese and Japanese descent, was born on March 4, 2007, in Tokyo. She was adopted at five weeks old and raised in Davis, Northern California. She is the third of four children. Her elder siblings were adopted from Japan and Kazakhstan. Her adoptive mother's side of the family is also Japanese and Miyako grew up celebrating Japanese holidays.

== Career ==
Miyako began her career at four years old as a child model, landing gigs with Gap, Ralph Lauren, Skechers, and Gymboree. She made her acting debut in a 2015 episode of the CBS police procedural Hawaii Five-0 as a young version of Grace Park's character. This was followed by further guest roles in American Horror Story and American Housewife in 2016 and 2017 respectively. In 2018, Cech made her film debut in The Darkest Minds as Zu, a mute girl who can manipulate electricity. The film received generally negative reviews, but her performance received praise. Deadline Hollywood said Miyako "do[es] what [she] can with nothing", while IndieWire considered her a standout.

The following year, Miyako starred in the Netflix film Rim of the World as ZhenZhen. Released on May 24, 2019, the film was negatively received by critics; Miyako's performance received commendation, however. John Serba of Decider said, "[Miyako] is my favorite, carrying the character in her sideways glances and quiet, confident swagger[.] ... She's funnier [than the males], too." Later that month, she portrayed a pre-teen version of the protagonist Sasha Tran (Ali Wong) in the Netflix film Always Be My Maybe. According to Variety, this is Miyako's most well-known film role. Later that year, she starred as Akiko Yamato in the second revival of Nickelodeon's Are You Afraid of the Dark?. The series was critically acclaimed; Decider called Miyako the "[s]leeper [s]tar" of the show.

From 2020 to 2021, Miyako starred in the Nickelodeon drama series The Astronauts. Common Sense Media praised the child actors, calling them wonderful. Miyako played a lead role of Sammy in Marvelous and the Black Hole, which premiered at the 2021 Sundance Film Festival. Critics acclaimed her performance. IndieWire stated, "[the film is] grounded by... Miyako, who effectively channels the angst of teendom into an offbeat tale... [and] does solid work in immersing us in Sammy's frustration and sadness, even if the script doesn't always give her the best lines to punch with." In December 2021, she was announced to have been cast in a lead role alongside YaYa Gosselin in Apple TV+ series Surfside Girls. She will portray Jade, who seeks to "find a scientific explanation for the existence of ghosts".

On September 19, 2024, it was announced that she would play Toph Beifong in the Netflix live-action Avatar: The Last Airbender series.

== Filmography ==
=== Film ===
Year	Title	Role	Notes
2018	The Darkest Minds	Suzume "Zu" Kimura	
2019	Rim of the World	ZhenZhen	
2019	Always Be My Maybe	12-year-old Sasha	
2021	Marvelous and the Black Hole	Sammy	
2022	Dealing with Dad	Young Margaret	
2023	A Great Divide	Ellie Licht	
2023	American Girl: Corinne Tan	Corinne Tan	
2023	You Are So Not Invited to My Bat Mitzvah	Kym Chang Cohen	
2025	Marshmallow	May	

=== Television ===
Year	Title	Role	Notes
2015	Hawaii Five-0	Young Kono Kalakaua	Episode: "Mo'o 'olelo Pu"
2015	The Thundermans	Ice Cream Kid	Episode: "Why You Buggin'?"
2015	Hand of God	Little Girl	Episode: "Contemplating the Body"
2016	American Horror Story	Amy Chen	Episode: "Chapter 4"
2017–2019	American Housewife	Marigold	3 episodes
2019	Arrow	Young Emiko Queen	Episode: "Inheritance"
2019	Are You Afraid of the Dark?	Akiko Yamato	Main role; 3 episodes
2020–2021	The Astronauts	Samantha "Samy" Sawyer-Wei	Main role; 9 episodes
2022	Surfside Girls	Jade	Lead role; 10 episodes
2022–2023	The Santa Clauses	Doc Martin	3 episodes
2023	Young Rock	Bad Cindy	2 episodes
2023	Beef	Teenage Amy Lau	Episode: "The Drama of Original Choice"
2026–present	Avatar: The Last Airbender	Toph Beifong	Main role; seasons 2–3
