= The Keepers of the 5 Kingdoms =

2024 directed by Zack Ward

- Theatrical release poster
- Patsy Lee & the Keepers of the 5 Kingdoms
- Directed by: Zack Ward
- Written by: Zack Ward; Ace Underhill
- Story by: James Hong
- Produced by: Aria C. Yang; James Hong
- Starring: James Hong; Matthew Sato; Anna Harr; Michelle Mao; Bai Ling; Dante Basco; Dave Sheridan; Saxon Sharbino
- Cinematography: Ace Underhill
- Edited by: Zack Ward
- Production companies: Brilliant Screen Studios; Vision Films
- Distributed by: Mauris Film
- Release dates: July 4, 2024 (Russia); February 20, 2024 (United States)
- Running time: 110 minutes
- Language: English

The Keepers of the 5 Kingdoms is a 2024 epic fantasy film directed by Zack Ward and produced by James Hong. It stars Matthew Sato, Michelle Mao, Anna Harr, Bai Ling, Dante Basco, Dave Sheridan, and Saxon Sharbino. The story follows a grandfather and his granddaughter who are transported from their small-town curio shop in Arizona to a mystical land through a portal stone.

== Plot ==
Patsy Lee is a diligent high school student who wants to get into a good college to escape her life in a small Arizona town. She feels her mother works too much, and her grandfather, Chuck Lee, is annoyed that Patsy isn't interested in her Chinese culture and language. However, despite the family conflicts, Patsy Lee gets help from her best friend, Squirrel, and her beloved companion, Hopper, whose relationships are not defined explicitly.

The situation becomes unusual for Patsy when a rat named Frank and a chicken named Hank appear to look for a magical box. The girls meet them, and the friends find the box. Then all of them are mysteriously transferred to the fantastic place filled with both magic and danger.

In this fantastic world, the evil Lord Kuang rules and wants to have the magical box to use her full destructive power. Patsy and her friends have to fight dangerous butterflies, fake ogres, the wicked Wu Witch, hopping vampires, and many other creatures. At the same time, they have to protect the box and find their way home. On their adventure, Patsy and her friends get help from Ao, a clever tortoise.

== Cast ==
- James Hong as Chuck Lee
- Michelle Mao as Patsy Lee
- Anna Harr as Squirrel
- Matthew Sato as Hopper
- Dante Basco as Frank
- Dave Sheridan as Hank
- Bai Ling as Kuang
- Fiona Rene as Donna Lee
- Saxon Sharbino as Allura

== Production and release ==
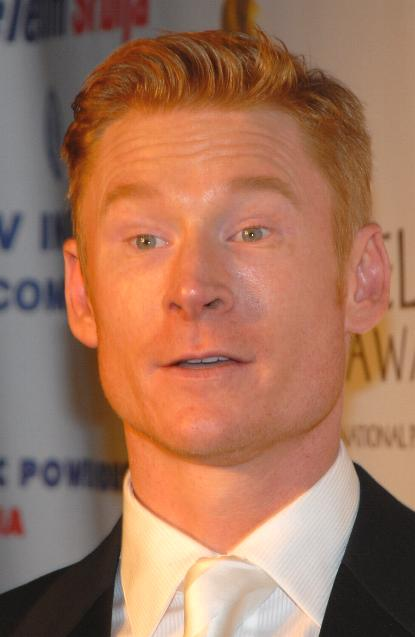
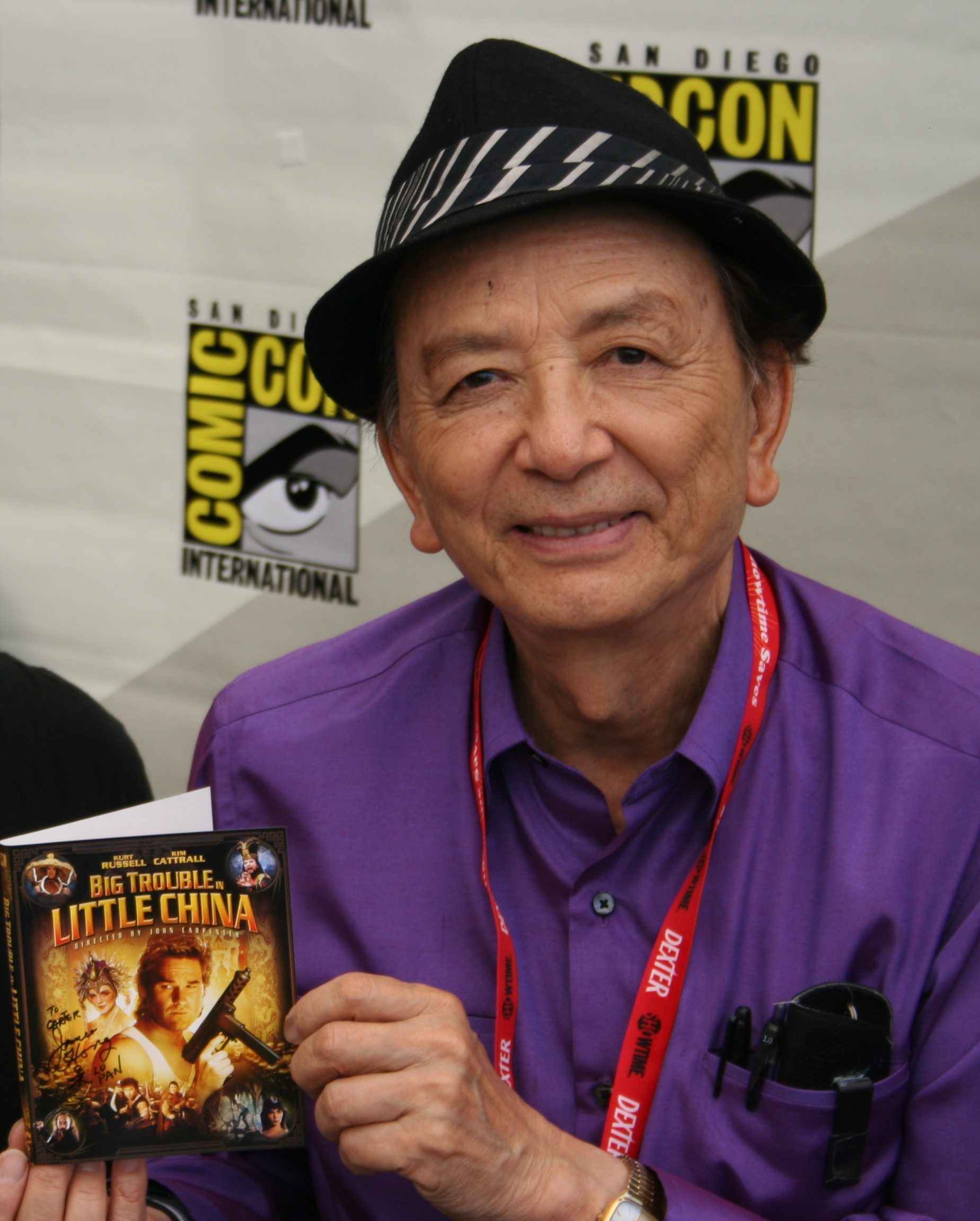
Director Zack Ward (left) and Actor James Hong

In 2018, Michelle Mao (then credited as Michelle Fang) secured a lead role in the film Patsy Lee & The Keepers of The Five Kingdoms. The film was directed and co-wroten by Zack Ward. In a 2023 interview with Comic Book Resources, James Hong revealed that the inspiration for film came from fairy tale comic books he used to read with his mother during his childhood.

Vision Films announced the transactional VOD release of Patsy Lee & the Keepers of the 5 Kingdoms on June 18, 2024. And features a largely Asian cast, including James Hong, George Takei, and Bai Ling. It was scheduled for release via Video On Demand (VOD) after being acquired by Fairway Film Alliance, the film incorporates practical effects, puppetry, and visual effects, drawing inspiration from fantasy films of the 1980s.

== Reception ==
In his review for Voices from the Balcony, Jim Morazzini gave Patsy Lee & the Keepers of the 5 Kingdoms a mixed rating of 3.5 out of 5 stars. He praised the creativity of the story, the commendable practical effects by Clara Gonzalez-Garza's team, and James Hong's standout performance.
