= YaYa Gosselin =

American actress (born 2009)

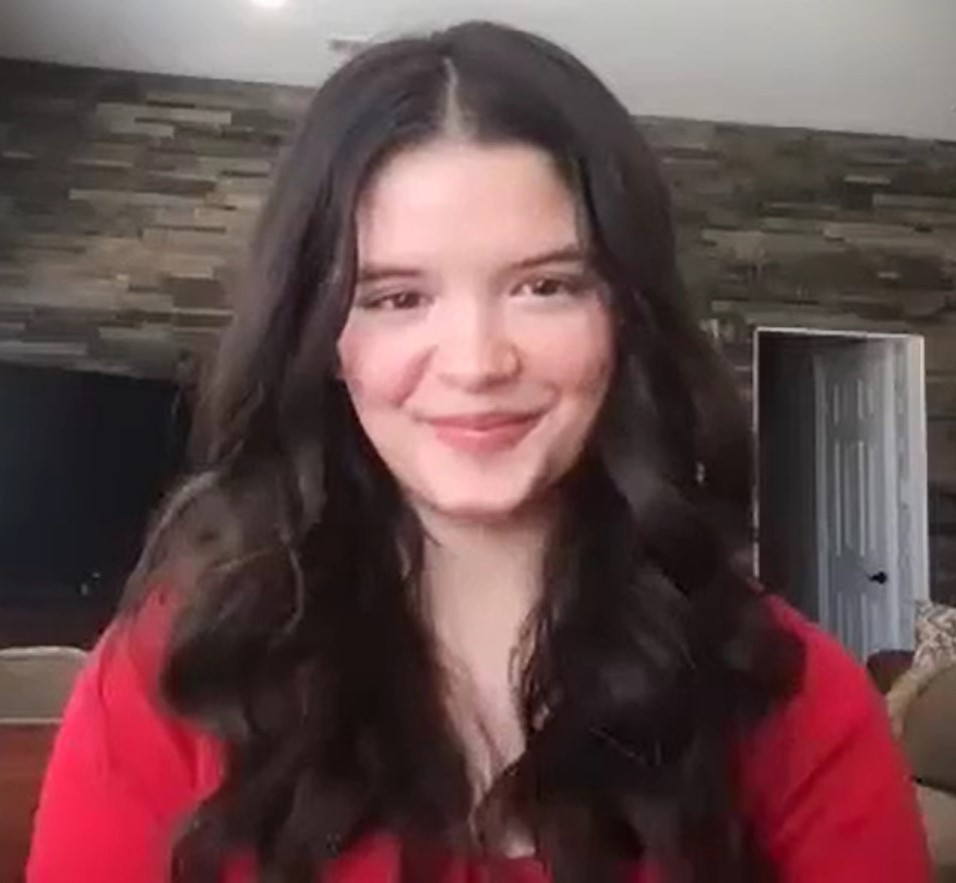
- Gosselin in 2023
- Born: Felisita Leon Gosselin; January 26, 2009 (age 17); Dallas, Texas, U.S.
- Occupations: Actress; model
- Years active: 2017–present

Felisita Leon "YaYa" Gosselin (born January 26, 2009) is an American actress. She began her career modelling for commercials and made her acting debut in After Omelas (2017). Following this, she made minor appearances in Peppermint (2018), The Purge (2018), 13 Reasons Why (2019–2020), and FBI (2019–2020). She reprised her role in its spin-off FBI: Most Wanted (2020–2022) as Tali LaCroix in which she was a regular in the second season. Gosselin gained wide recognition for playing the lead role of Missy Moreno in Netflix's We Can Be Heroes (2020).

== Early life ==
Gosselin was born in Dallas on January 26, 2009, to Monica Mendez-Gosselin. Gosselin's birth name, Felisita, was after her great-grandmother Felisita Chavez, as was her nickname YaYa. At the age of three, she began acting at Dallas Children's Theatre and also studied acting at DTV Studios. Gosselin studied contemporary and ballet at Ohlook Performing Arts Center. She has two younger sisters. They are Latinas.

== Career ==
At the age of five, Gosselin signed with an agency and booked her first job a month later, modeling for commercials such as JCPenney, Famous Footwear, Hasbro, and Conn's HomePlus commercials. In 2017, she appeared in After Omelas. In 2018, she made minor appearances in action thriller film Peppermint and the anthology television series The Purge.

Gosselin played Jenny Finley in Lord Finn for which she won an award for Best Child Actress at the Sunny Side Up Film Festival in 2020. She appeared in a recurring role in FBI before appearing in FBI: Most Wanted, in which she recurred in the first season and became a regular in the second. According to Deadline Hollywood, Gosselin will become a guest star. In August 2019, at the age of ten, Gosselin was reported to have joined the cast of Netflix's We Can Be Heroes, the standalone sequel to The Adventures of Sharkboy and Lavagirl in 3-D. Gosselin stated she enjoyed filming and stunt work, saying it was "challenging for sure, but it is so fun". Netflix released the film on December 25, 2020. Gosselin received praise for her performance. Chicago Sun-Times praised her "winning performance", and RogerEbert.com said the role would "hopefully" be the "breakthrough for a long career". In the first four weeks of its release, the film was watched by 44 million households. In January 2021, Netflix ordered a sequel. In March 2021, Gosselin was cast in feature film Trans Los Angeles in a segment of the film titled Period. She will play a shy 12-year-old girl. In December of that year, Gosselin was announced as a lead actress in Apple TV+ series Surfside Girls alongside Miya Cech. The former stars as Sam, who, with her best friend Jade (Cech), meets a ghost and hopes to break a curse.

== Filmography ==
Key
†	Denotes films that have not yet been released

=== Film ===
Year	Title	Role	Notes	Ref.
2017	After Omelas	Lauren	Short film	
2018	Peppermint	Ana		
2018	Laugh Till It Hurts	Tiara	Short film	
2018	Law and Order: Sting Unit	Officer Olivia	Short film	
2018	Day 13	Gabby Rae	Short film	
2019	Lord Finn	Jenny Finley		
2020	We Can Be Heroes	Missy Moreno		
2021	Dr. Bird's Advice for Sad Poets	Young Jorie		
2023	Heart of a Champion	Charlie		
2025	Trans Los Angeles	Madison		
2026	The Drama	Jessica		

=== Television ===
Year	Title	Role	Notes	Ref.
2018	The Purge	Young Penelope	Episode: "The Urge to Purge"	
2019–2020	FBI	Natalia "Tali" Skye LaCroix	2 episodes; Guest (seasons 1–2)	
2019–2020	13 Reasons Why	Graciella Padilla	2 episodes; Guest (seasons 3–4)	
2020–2022	FBI: Most Wanted	Natalia "Tali" Skye LaCroix	Recurring role (season 1); Main role (seasons 2–3)	
2022	Surfside Girls	Sam	Main role	
