= Michelle Mao =

American-born actress

- Born: Xinyi Fang; 19 March; Nashville, Tennessee, U.S.
- Other name: Michelle Fang
- Education: University of California, Berkeley (BA); Tsinghua University (MA)
- Occupation: Actress
- Years active: 2017–present

Xinyi Fang (born 19 March), known professionally as Michelle Mao, is an actress. Her films include The Keepers of the 5 Kingdoms (2024) and Zi (2026). On television, she appeared in the Apple TV+ series Surfside Girls (2022) and the fourth season of the Netflix series Bridgerton (2026).

== Early life and education ==
Xinyi "Michelle" Fang was born on 19 March in Nashville. She grew up in Hong Kong and Beijing and went to boarding school in England, where she discovered a love of theatre. She graduated with a Bachelor of Arts (BA) in Media Studies from the University of California, Berkeley in 2019. During her time at Berkeley, she was involved in the initiatives the Malala Fund and the AAPI Bone Marrow Donor Program, and helped launch Future Forum Beijing in 2017. Fang then pursued a 2021–2022 Master of Arts (MA) in Global Affairs at Tsinghua University back in Beijing as a Schwarzman Scholar.

== Career ==
Initially credited as Michelle Fang, she began her career during her time at Berkeley, appearing in shorts and music videos and doing the English dubs for Korean series and films. She starred as the titular character of the Hooked TV series Morgan's Secret Admirer. In 2022, Fang had her first named film role as Lisa Randall in the Netflix teen band film Metal Lords and a recurring role as Amy in the Apple TV+ series Surfside Girls. She portrayed a young version of Françoise Yip's character Victoria in the 2023 reboot of the series Goosebumps on Hulu and Disney+.

In 2024, Fang starred as Patsy Lee in the fantasy film The Keepers of the 5 Kingdoms, having been cast back in 2018. Credited as Michelle Mao, she had supporting roles in the 2025 films Preparation for the Next Life and A Big Bold Beautiful Journey. Mao starred in Kogonada's film Zi, which premiered at the 2026 Sundance Film Festival. That same year, she played Rosamund Li in the fourth season of the Netflix period drama Bridgerton.

She has upcoming roles in the independent film Caity and as Yara in the third season of the HBO series The Last of Us.

== Filmography ==
Key
†	Denotes films that have not yet been released

=== Film ===
Year	Title	Role	Notes
2018	Bumblebee	Mean Girl / Partygoer	
2019	The Forest of Love	Mitsuko	English dub
2020	#Alive	Additional voices	English dub
2022	Metal Lords	Lisa Randall	
2024	The Keepers of the 5 Kingdoms	Patsy Lee	
2025	Preparation for the Next Life	Angela	
2025	A Big Bold Beautiful Journey	Smitty	
2026	Zi	Zi	
2026	Caity	Petey	

==== Shorts ====
Year	Title	Role	Notes
2017	Irrevocable	Maggie	
2017	Blowing Smoke	Megan	
2017	Notes for December	Violinist	
2018	Hunter's First Homicide	Maggie	UCB student film
2018	About Tonight	Sammy	
2018	A Woman at War	Mallory Peters	
2018	88 Cents	Waitress	
2018	Exuding Love	Cheyenne	
2018	I Love You So		
2019	"Dating with Footnotes: Why Concert Dates are the Worst"	June	College Humor
2019	@theinternet	Kim	
2020	To All the Kevins	Lara Jean	
2021	Tho	Cerise	
2022	All I Want is Everything	Alice	
2022	The Basics of Love	Waitress	
2023	My Nights Glow Yellow	K	
2024	Cosmetic Criminals	Charlotte	e.l.f. parody

=== Television ===
Year	Title	Role	Notes
2019	A Couple of Spies	Influencer	Miniseries
2019	My First First Love	Oh Ga-rin	English dub, 16 episodes
2019	13 Reasons Why	Protestor	1 episode
2020	9-1-1	Lauren	Episode: "Pinned"
2020	Sweet Home		English dub, 10 episodes
2020–2021	Morgan's Secret Admirer	Morgan Gaines	Lead role
2021	So Not Worth It	Jun-yeong's tutor	English dub, 1 episode
2022	Surfside Girls	Amy	6 episodes
2022	Kung Fu	Tracy Fong	Episode: "Harmony"
2023	Goosebumps	Young Victoria	2 episodes
2024	FBI: Most Wanted	Evelyn May	Episode: "Desperate"
2026	Bridgerton	Rosamund Li	8 episodes
2027	The Last of Us †	Yara	Main role (season 3)

=== Music video ===
Song	Year	Artist	Notes
"ABG"	2018	Chow Mane	
"Pressure"	2018	Muse	
"Lay With Me"	2018	Phantoms & Vanessa Hudgens	
