= FBI: Most Wanted season 2 =

Season of American television series

FBI: Most Wanted
- Season 2
- Starring: Julian McMahon; Kellan Lutz; Roxy Sternberg; Keisha Castle-Hughes; Nathaniel Arcand; YaYa Gosselin; Miguel Gomez
- No. of episodes: 15

Release
- Original network: CBS
- Original release: November 17, 2020 – May 25, 2021

Season chronology
- ← Previous; Season 1 Next → Season 3

The second season of American crime drama series FBI: Most Wanted premiered on November 17, 2020, and concluded on May 25, 2021, on CBS with a total of 15 episodes. This is the final season to feature Nathaniel Arcand as Clinton Skye and the first season to feature Miguel Gomez as Ivan Ortiz and YaYa Gosselin as Tali LaCroix.

== Cast and characters ==
=== Main ===
- Julian McMahon as Jess LaCroix, FBI Supervisory Special Agent (SSA) and Team Leader of the Fugitive Task Force.
- Kellan Lutz as Kenny Crosby, FBI Special Agent and ex-Army Intelligence officer of the Fugitive Task Force.
- Roxy Sternberg as Sheryll Barnes, FBI Special Agent and the team's Second in Command of the Fugitive Task Force.
- Keisha Castle-Hughes as Hana Gibson, FBI Special Agent and Technical Analyst of the Fugitive Task Force.
- Nathaniel Arcand as Clinton Skye (episodes 1–3), FBI Special Agent, the team's sharpshooter/sniper, and LaCroix's brother-in-law.
- YaYa Gosselin as Tali LaCroix, daughter of Jess LaCroix and his wife, Angelyne and niece of Clinton Skye.
- Miguel Gomez as Ivan Ortiz (episodes 8–15), FBI Special Agent and Clinton's replacement as the team's sharpshooter/sniper.

=== Recurring ===
- Lorne Cardinal as Nelson Skye, father of Clinton Skye, father-in-law of Jess LaCroix and grandfather of Tali LaCroix.
- Irene Bedard as Marilou Skye, mother of Clinton Skye, mother-in-law of Jess LaCroix and grandmother of Tali LaCroix.
- Amy Carlson as Jackie Ward, veteran bounty hunter.
- Terry O'Quinn as Byron LaCroix, father of Jess LaCroix and grandfather of Tali LaCroix.
- Jen Landon as Sarah Allen, Jess's girlfriend.

== Episodes ==
| No. overall | No. in season | Title | Directed by | Written by | Original release date | Prod. code | U.S. viewers (millions) |
|---|---|---|---|---|---|---|---|
| 15 | 1 | "Rampage" | Jim McKay | Richard Sweren | November 17, 2020 | MW202 | 5.38 |
LaCroix and the Fugitive Task Force must hunt for 17-year-old Kyle Dennison and his accomplice Harris Folger who are on a rampage throughout a small town in Pennsylvania, killing people they believe oppressed them. They learn that both suffered heavy losses in the early months of the COVID-19 pandemic, with Folger losing his wife and job, while Kyle lost his disapproving father not long after his mother in a car accident. Remaining acquittances of Kyle describe him as a good person despite his involvement, and LaCroix asks his art teacher to make a message for him in addition to urging his surrender. When Folger and Kyle scope their last target, he has second thoughts and kills Folger and escapes to his mother's memorial, where the task force talks him into surrendering. LaCroix's father Byron returns to celebrate Tali's birthday, bringing a new girlfriend with him, with whom they announce that they will get married. Despite his re-emergence into LaCroix' life, the animosity between them still lingers.: Starting with this episode, YaYa Gosselin (Tali Skye LaCroix) becomes a series regular while Terry O'Quinn (Byron LaCroix) is credited as a Special Guest Star.
| 16 | 2 | "Execute" | Jim McKay | Elizabeth Rinehart | November 24, 2020 | MW201 | 5.69 |
The Fugitive Task Force searches for a hacker after he triggers a car crash in which three members of the same family are killed, leaving a young girl as the only survivor. Through the deceased son's game chat, they identify a user that he and others bullied for an alleged malfunctioned hack, subsequently identifying him as Lucas Earley, who was kicked out of his family home for his refusal to give up gaming and find a job. Earley targets a hospital in Boston, where his mother works and shuts down its electrical system, causing two fatalities. He later targets a tech company he used to work briefly for, which he utilises as a midway point to hack an airliner. The task force track his location to a former computer camp councillor's house, where he keeps her hostage. LaCroix and his team storm the house, while Hana and Crosby work to neutralise his hack on the airliner while LaCroix attempts to talk Earley down. He is however unsuccessful once Earley becomes more and more dangerous, allowing Clinton to snipe him. At a group dinner later, Hana reveals that she was adopted and is considering seeking out her biological mother, which her colleagues encourage her to do.
| 17 | 3 | "Deconflict" | Elodie Keene | Wendy West | December 8, 2020 | MW203 | 4.92 |
Avery Garnier is abducted from her own home after an elderly man steals from her safe and kills her husband. The task force investigate and Jess discovers similarities in the case to an old case he worked 18 years ago in 2002 when he first joined the FBI, with them learning that the fugitive is the same as back then, Maurice Hewitt. Their investigation crosses paths with the U. S. Marshals and bounty hunter Jackie Ward, who is also on the hunt for Hewitt. His murder pattern strikes anyone close to Garnier, whose real name is Elyse Shipchuck when she was placed in witness protection. As his final stand, Hewitt robs the same bank as he did 18 years ago, but traps Garnier in the process. LaCroix outsmarts him and cuffs him, and learns that Hewitt blames him for some of his actions and that he has a son. On the personal front, his relation with his father nears a boiling point and LaCroix reveals that he was upset that he didn't attend his wife's funeral. His father reveals he spent 15 months in prison for a petty crime, and ultimately decides for him and his fiancee to stay at LaCroix's sister's place.: This episode marks the final appearance of Nathaniel Arcand (Clinton Skye) while Terry O'Quinn (Byron LaCroix) and Amy Carlson (Jackie Ward) are credited as Special Guest Stars.
| 18 | 4 | "Anonymous" | Deran Sarafian | Spindrift Beck | January 19, 2021 | MW204 | 5.81 |
With Clinton on TDY for the director in regards to a case concerning public corruption that requires the use of agents with law degrees, the team search for Eva Martin, who's embarked on a killing spree and heading down a deadly road all while using her ties to an online conspiracy organization to help further her agenda. They learn that she was once was an aspiring law student, but struggled to meet her father's expectations until finally quitting shy of her graduation. When they learn she is targeting a local New Jersey councilman running for re-election, they discover an accomplice who shares the organisation's values, who reveals that Eva is carrying a bomb. At her former law school, they learn that Eva filed an accusation against fellow student Yates Warren, but the case was dismissed. After subduing a waitress, Eva infiltrates a private gentleman's club to seek revenge against Yates and his father, killing him and taking Yates hostage. Barnes manages to talk her into surrendering. On her personal front, she is hesitant with her wife's suggestion of having a second child, but is convinced to do so after the case.
| 19 | 5 | "The Line" | Jean de Segonzac | Dwain Worrell | January 26, 2021 | MW205 | 6.23 |
The Fugitive Task Force hunts for a rogue militia group after they shoot at several native teenagers crossing into the U.S. from Canada, working together with special-agent-in-charge Mike Fritts. They quickly learn from the shooters' family that they're weapons at illegally bought and that the group has never killed before until now. They surround a radio cabin, where Rob Wahl and his uncle Paul Flanks are hiding, where Paul tries to shoot back, but is swiftly taken down, while Rob surrenders. He points them to the third shooter, Anthony Noel, a former Iraq veteran turned radical, fighting against those he seems to have invaded his country. LaCroix and his team learn that he attempted to brainwash border guard Whitney Anderson, with whom he also fathers a child. They and police surround Noel at the immigration centre in Plattsburgh, and Crosby takes him out when he charges forwards. LaCroix and his father reconcile and he asks LaCroix to forgive him and asks him to come to his wedding, which he later accepts.: Terry O'Quinn (Byron LaCroix) is credited as a Special Guest Star.
| 20 | 6 | "Dysfunction" | Jim McKay | Melissa Scrivner Love | February 9, 2021 | MW206 | 5.64 |
The Fugitive Task Force is called in after a robbery goes wrong which ends with two dead and a mother and her daughter abducted. The second perpetrator, Peter Timmons, has a history of being non-violent, thereby proving his actions alongside accomplice Sam Rutledge to be out of character. The Task Force learns that the abducted mother, Amelia Cartwright, worked at the same prison Timmons was imprisoned at and the two had a relationship, resulting in their daughter Gracie, who is abducted daughter. It is also revealed that Amelia was the mastermind behind the robberies and the two kill Rutledge. The Task Force further learns that Amelia is manipulative and controlling, also bringing former football star David Collins into her plans for her and Timmons. The Task Force surround the Collins cabin and has him and Timmons arrested. Hana is shot when she tries to arrest Amelia, but Crosby prevents her from escaping. He also settles in with Hana and her roommate when his apartment is being repaired for leaks.
| 21 | 7 | "Winner" | Eric Laneuville | Wendy West & Spindrift Beck | March 2, 2021 | MW207 | 5.73 |
Travis Russell, a man on trial for murder, escapes before his trial starts and goes on a murder spree, seemingly targeting people who won the lottery. LaCroix and the Fugitive Task Force work with Jackie Ward, who is Russell's bonds person to capture him. Further investigation into the lottery factory, reveals that Russell had an accomplice on the inside to aid him tamper with the lottery prices in order to turn it into his ideal of lottery, but that she betrayed him and that he now seeks revenge. When his accomplice dies of food poisoning, the Task Force and Ward race to stop his second accomplice who he thinks betrayed him. Upon stopping her car, she tries to shoot Ward before Crosby tackles her. They discover Russell's body in the car, having been overpowered by the accomplice. On the personal front, LaCroix takes an interest in Tali's horseback riding teacher Sarah, but she declines his invitation for dinner.: Amy Carlson (Jackie Ward) is credited as a Special Guest Star.
| 22 | 8 | "Vanished" | Rose Troche | Elizabeth Rinehart | March 9, 2021 | MW208 | 6.14 |
As Special Agent Ivan Ortiz from the FBI counter-terrorism unit and also a Los Angeles native joins the Fugitive task force, the team hunt for repeat offender Samuel Smith who kidnapped a young boy, Caleb Vaughner, after killing his mother and grandmother. The Task Force paints a picture of a traumatised Smith who was kept in strict line as a kid, which he later put over his victims, two of which supposedly died. They identify an accomplice of Smith, who provided him with potential victims and arrange a meeting in a parking garage. Once they surround him, they attempt to retrieve Caleb's location from Smith, but he commits suicide by jumping, claiming they'll never find Caleb. His phone triangulation leads them to an old house, where they find his second victim, Daniel Cain, alive many years after his supposed death. Cain provides them with clues to Caleb's location, who survives and hospitalised. Simultaneously Daniel is reunited with his parents. Sarah tells LaCroix she is recovering from a recent breakup and wasn't prepared for him to ask her out, which she asks him to do again, which she this time accepts.: This episode marks the debut appearance of Miguel Gomez (Ivan Ortiz)
| 23 | 9 | "One-Zero" | Tess Malone | Richard Sweren & Dwain Worrell | March 16, 2021 | MW209 | 6.26 |
The Fugitive Task Force sets out to catch Ira Kopec, a serial killer who is placed on the FBI's Most Wanted List in the wake of the murder of several high school jocks. Kopec's actions escalate when he attacks and rapes a woman, who survives the ordeal. The Task Force learns that he also utilised medical substance provided by a medical colleague at his medical school used to drug his victims. They learn from his mother that he had a rough childhood, suffering from bullying by specifically jocks, whom he now blames for his suffering. They race to prevent him from shooting up his class' 10th anniversary reunion, where he also brings the former girlfriend of one of the former jocks, trapping her in a bathroom. Though they try to talk him down, Kopec resists and is gunned down. Hana returns from her medical leave, albeit continuing work in a limited capacity. On the personal front, LaCroix meets Sarah's ex husband for the first time, who desperately tries to get her back.
| 24 | 10 | "Spiderwebs" | Carlos Bernard | Ticona S. Joy & D. Dona Le | April 6, 2021 | MW210 | 6.44 |
When Crosby's old army buddy Matthew Turner is attacked late at night and the police suspect a drug deal gone wrong, it leads the team to search for answers and uncovers a dangerous web of conspiracy that originates with the murder of two gang members of a notorious Filipino gang in a prison in New Jersey. They soon learn that the fugitive is prison guard Brendan De Rossi who is trying to get back at the gang by using their burner phones as evidence. After his new girlfriend, who also conspired with him, double crosses him, he kills her and her mother as he goes to confront the head of the organisation responsible who also has ties to the prison, the gang and a sex trafficking ring. The Task Force finds themselves in a shootout with De Rossi and the gang before making their way through to apprehend De Rossi. Sarah comes to LaCroix to apologise for the encounter with her ex-husband. He questions if she still loves him, which Sarah rejects and he forgives her.
| 25 | 11 | "Obstruction" | Ken Girotti | Melissa Scrivner Love | April 27, 2021 | MW211 | 5.62 |
Former teacher Claudia D'Ambrose commits a double murder in Philadelphia, which the Task Force suspects was caused by her psychosis from bipolar disorder. They further discover that she blames herself for the murder of her favourite student Anissa Gomez in Sunnyvale, Maryland, who was murdered alongside her boyfriend Derek Krohl. With her murder pattern becoming unpredictable, all they gather is that she acts like a vigilante to seek justice for Anissa, much to the townsfolks' satisfaction. But as her pile of innocent victims grow, the Task Force learns that a recording of the killer's voice was edited to cover up the killer's identity, as admitted by the local sheriff. Claudia takes the sheriff's daughter and the mayor's son hostage and forces the latter to confess to killing Anissa just as the Task Force and police storm the diner. As LaCroix's relationship with Sarah grows, her ex-husband Hugh trashes her home, but is caught on a doorbell camera. LaCroix meets him to confirm Hugh's motives and local police arrest him.
| 26 | 12 | "Criminal Justice" | Milena Govich | Richard Sweren | May 4, 2021 | MW212 | 5.49 |
James Johnson, a young African American man accidentally shoots a white cop in self-defense and goes on the run which leads to the team members finding themselves in a moral dilemma on the best way to carry out justice while public support for Johnson increases despite his racking criminal actions. Members of the public sympathetic to his cause aid his escape, and the case becomes challenging for Barnes when her wife becomes a part of Johnson's legal defense team. Johnson releases a video to the media where he confesses to killing the cop, but remains vague on if he thinks it was justified. With the help of another young African American, he holds a former undercover cop hostage in Queens, who identifies his half-brother as a drug dealer scene years ago. The Task Force manages to get the half-brother to the scene from prison for him to talk to Johnson. Barnes' wife Charlotte arrives to give assurances to Johnson and he, his half-brother and Johnson's accomplice surrender in the end. Charlotte is offered a position at a law firm, giving her a chance to return to courtroom practise and she and Barnes lay out plans to have a second child.
| 27 | 13 | "Toxic" | Ken Girotti | Gina Gionfriddo & Elizabeth Rinehart | May 11, 2021 | MW213 | 5.79 |
The Fugitive Task Force sets out to track brothers Greg and Wyatt Hammond, both placed on the Most Wanted List after they are set on getting revenge against members of Griffin Coal & Power that caused their town's environmental destruction. Their pattern of killings starts with Greg's former supervisor, a member of the HR department and another employee before they go after the company boss Larry Griffin. A bomb goes of in an art gallery which the company spent money on instead of aiding the community and the Task Force stop Wyatt from getting to Griffin's attorneys. When his daughter is kidnapped by Greg, Griffin takes matters into his own hands in order to end it all. His confrontation with Greg makes his daughter change views on him once Greg is apprehended, she decides to relinquish the land that she was set to inherit from Griffin, forcing his company to finally publicly acknowledge that they dumped illegal waste. Sarah gets to meet LaCroix's family, but his father and sister share a heated disagreement about letting her stay at their place without Jess' input. However he accepts the proposal.: Terry O'Quinn (Byron LaCroix) is credited as a Special Guest Star.
| 28 | 14 | "Hustler" | John Polson | Wendy West & Spindrift Beck | May 18, 2021 | MW214 | 5.48 |
The Fugitive Task Force works with the JTTF, heads to Washington, D.C., to protect a former informant, Sheri James, of Ortiz after a hitman tries to kill her, but killing her sister instead. The case becomes personal for Ortiz who was in a relationship with Sheri, but things take a turn when she is murdered. The Task Force also deduces that Max Nikolla, who Sheri had helped Ortiz get behind bars and who was recently released from prison, wasn't responsible for her death, but solely the bombing of a marathon event. Ortiz also learns that to his dismay, Sheri had been hustling her clients, including himself, and was also pregnant. They track down the hitman, Nancy Lawson, who was paid by Indiana congressman Reese Holland, and deduces that he might be the father of Sheri's child. Holland is arrested for his involvement. Byron and Marie get married on the LaCroix farm, also attended by Jess' colleagues and Sarah. His father also encourages him to go further with his relationship with Sarah.: Terry O'Quinn (Byron LaCroix) is credited as a Special Guest Star.
| 29 | 15 | "Chattaboogie" | Milena Govich | David Hudgins | May 25, 2021 | MW215 | 5.79 |
A Special Agent with the Office of the Inspector General enlists the help of LaCroix and the Fugitive Task Force to locate DEA agent Clayton Smith, who is laying low or operating undercover in Tennessee after they suspect he may have turned dirty. However, when they find his informant and Smith dead, they suspect he may not have gone rogue after all. The Task Force and local police tactically begin to question three families involved in a drug and money laundering ring out of a car dealership, where the shooter, Evan Greeter, is trying to take over his deceased father's place in the operation by wiping out everyone he believes failed his family. The Task Force and police get ahead and surround the Kleinman residence where Greeter and his girlfriend holds Susan Kleinman hostage. However, she manages to break free and they take out Greeter and his girlfriend, with the former surviving. Sarah wonders if she was too quick to move in with Jess and Tali. At the end of the episode, Sarah's estranged husband, who has been released on bail, turns up at Jess's house with a gun. He breaks in, Kenny and Jess follow, round a corner and multiple shots are fired, ending the episode in a cliffhanger.

== Production ==
On May 6, 2020, CBS renewed the series for a second season, which premiered on November 17, 2020. On August 28, 2020, it was announced that showrunner René Balcer would be leaving the series and David Hudgins would be taking over for the second season.

== Ratings ==
Viewership and ratings per episode of FBI: Most Wanted season 2
| No. | Title | Air date | Rating (18–49) | Viewers (millions) | DVR (18–49) | DVR viewers (millions) | Total (18–49) | Total viewers (millions) |
|---|---|---|---|---|---|---|---|---|
| 1 | "Rampage" | November 17, 2020 | 0.6 | 5.38 | 0.4 | 3.19 | 1.0 | 8.57 |
| 2 | "Execute" | November 24, 2020 | 0.7 | 5.69 | —N/a | —N/a | —N/a | —N/a |
| 3 | "Deconflict" | December 8, 2020 | 0.5 | 4.92 | 0.4 | 2.91 | 0.9 | 7.83 |
| 4 | "Anonymous" | January 19, 2021 | 0.6 | 5.81 | —N/a | —N/a | —N/a | —N/a |
| 5 | "The Line" | January 26, 2021 | 0.7 | 6.23 | —N/a | —N/a | —N/a | —N/a |
| 6 | "Dysfunction" | February 9, 2021 | 0.6 | 5.64 | 0.4 | 3.34 | 1.0 | 8.98 |
| 7 | "Winner" | March 2, 2021 | 0.5 | 5.73 | 0.5 | 3.54 | 1.0 | 9.28 |
| 8 | "Vanished" | March 9, 2021 | 0.6 | 6.14 | 0.4 | 3.09 | 1.0 | 9.23 |
| 9 | "One-Zero" | March 16, 2021 | 0.6 | 6.26 | —N/a | —N/a | —N/a | —N/a |
| 10 | "Spiderwebs" | April 6, 2021 | 0.7 | 6.44 | 0.4 | 3.09 | 1.1 | 9.53 |
| 11 | "Obstruction" | April 27, 2021 | 0.6 | 5.62 | 0.3 | 2.51 | 0.9 | 8.13 |
| 12 | "Criminal Justice" | May 4, 2021 | 0.6 | 5.49 | 0.4 | 2.94 | 0.9 | 8.43 |
| 13 | "Toxic" | May 11, 2021 | 0.6 | 5.79 | 0.4 | 2.92 | 1.0 | 8.71 |
| 14 | "Hustler" | May 18, 2021 | 0.5 | 5.48 | 0.4 | 2.77 | 0.9 | 8.25 |
| 15 | "Chattaboogie" | May 25, 2021 | 0.5 | 5.79 | 0.4 | 2.98 | 0.9 | 8.77 |
