= FBI: Most Wanted season 3 =

Season of American television series

FBI: Most Wanted
- Season 3
- Starring: Julian McMahon; Dylan McDermott; Alexa Davalos; Kellan Lutz; Roxy Sternberg; Keisha Castle-Hughes; YaYa Gosselin; Miguel Gomez
- No. of episodes: 22

Release
- Original network: CBS
- Original release: September 21, 2021 – May 24, 2022

Season chronology
- ← Previous; Season 2 Next → Season 4

The third season of the American police procedural television series FBI: Most Wanted premiered on September 21, 2021, on CBS, for the 2021–22 television season, and ended on May 24, 2022. The season premiered with a crossover event with FBI and new spin-off series FBI: International. The season contained 22 episodes.

FBI: Most Wanted focuses on the work of FBI's New York Fugitive Task Force, which relentlessly tracks and captures the notorious and dangerous criminals on the FBI's Most Wanted list. This is the final season to feature Julian McMahon as Team Leader Jess LaCroix, Kellan Lutz as Special Agent Kenny Crosby, YaYa Gosselin as Tali LaCroix, and Miguel Gomez as Special Agent Ivan Ortiz. It is the first season to feature Dylan McDermott and Alexa Davalos as Team Leader Remy Scott and Special Agent Kristin Gaines.

== Cast and characters ==
=== Main ===
- Julian McMahon as Supervisory Special Agent Jess LaCroix (episodes 1–14)
- Dylan McDermott as Supervisory Special Agent Remy Scott (episodes 17–22)
- Alexa Davalos as Special Agent Kristin Gaines.
- Kellan Lutz as Special Agent Kenny Crosby (episode 1).
- Roxy Sternberg as Special Agent Sheryll Barnes.
- Keisha Castle-Hughes as Special Agent Hana Gibson.
- YaYa Gosselin as Tali Skye LaCroix (episodes 1–10).
- Miguel Gomez as Special Agent Ivan Ortiz (episodes 1–21)

=== Recurring ===
- Terry O'Quinn as Byron LaCroix, father of Jess LaCroix and grandfather of Tali LaCroix.
- Jen Landon as Sarah Allen, Jess's girlfriend.
- Matt Mercurio as George Kouka, half brother of Hana Gibson.

=== Crossover ===
- Missy Peregrym as Special Agent Maggie Bell
- Zeeko Zaki as Special Agent Omar Adom "OA" Zidan
- Alana de la Garza as Special Agent in Charge Isobel Castille

== Episodes ==
No. overall	No. in season	Title	Directed by	Written by	Original release date	Prod. code	U.S. viewers (millions)
30	1	"Exposed"	Ken Girotti	Story by : Dick Wolf & David Hudgins & Elizabeth Rinehart; Teleplay by : David Hudgins & Elizabeth Rinehart	September 21, 2021	MW301	7.12
As they wait for news on Kenny, who is being treated for wounds he received after being shot by his old friend, Curtis Williams, an Army veteran turned hired assassin, while assisting agents Maggie Bell and OA Zidan of the FBI's New York field office on a case which started with the murder of a woman, Nicole Wyatt on federal property and led to the uncovering of a sex trafficking ring involving underage girls during the FBI Season 4 premiere episode, "All That Glitters", the Fugitive Task Force are assigned to hunt down a suspect believed to be responsible for the murder of billionaire Nathan Tate which triggers a gunfight in downtown New York City that ends with the suspect dead an NYPD officer, Mateo Paz injured when the team are ambushed by two men in a BMW with Barnes later revealing Paz died much to Jess's anger and has the team meeting Kristin Gaines, an agent from the FBI's Miami field office who has been investigating the suspect as well as his movements, Kristin telling them the suspect, Efraim Amit, an Israeli national was recruited by Mossad and was smuggling something given his frequent trips aboard. Jess also learns that he and Kenny have been cleared of the shooting that occurred at Jess's house which also reveals that Kenny shot dead Hugh Holt, the ex-husband of Jess's girlfriend, Sarah Allen when Hugh attempted to kill Sarah and Jess's daughter, Tali. With the team splitting up, Ortiz and Barnes examining the BMW, Jess and OA meet Andrea Walcaott, Julia's mother who's devastated at her daughter's murder and unable to grasp what was going on, OA vowing they will get the person responsible. With assistance from OA who temporarily joins the team and Kristin, they soon find a yacht where a store room has the bodies of four murdered women who were tied up and fatally shot in the head, Jess and Kristin discovering three of the four victims are European citizens, one Croatian, two French and one American with Jess coming to the realization it's not drugs but sex trafficking while Kent himself is seen talking to a man via cell phone, telling the unnamed man it's raining and that he needs an umbrella, Kent revealing he's bringing the man a gift from America. The team also apprehend Fiona Grant who OA and his partner, Maggie Bell had previously interviewed with Fiona revealing she was running away from Kent for her own safety while Ortiz and Barnes talk to Jamie Jones who they arrested, Jones revealing damning evidence of Fiona having sex with Kent and a fifteen year old runaway named Sunny, Jess telling Fiona that the video's enough to put her away in federal prison for the rest of her own life as a convicted sex offender. Fiona later gives them a list of various men from all the world who are members of the sex trafficking ring, Jess revealing that Kent rotated them between the two cities to keep the product fresh while OA suspects that Nathan Tate who he and Maggie had sought to arrest earlier had taken out a hit against Pierre Nagy, a man who was shot dead in Budapest, Hungary while Kent later took a hit on Tate, presumably to stop him from confessing everything. After tracking Kent to a mansion, having learnt of it from Richard Cox, they travel there, only to discover a scene of absolute carnage as various dead bodies of officers from the local police department and the two men from the BMW earlier lie around the place. During the process, Barnes, Ortiz and OA learn that Kent has fled via an airplane while inside, Kristin and Jess learn from Gareth, the man Kent spoke to earlier that he now has information concerning the identities of those involved in the sex trafficking ring. Note: This episode continues a crossover event that begins on the season 4 premiere of FBI and concludes on the pilot episode of FBI: International.. Missy Peregrym (Maggie Bell), Zeeko Zaki (Omar Adom "OA" Zidan) and Alana de la Garza (Isobel Castille) are credited as Special Guest Stars. This episode also marks the debut appearance of Alexa Davalos (Kristin Gaines) and the final appearance of Kellan Lutz (Kenny Crosby).
31	2	"Patriots"	Peter Stebbings	Richard Sweren	September 28, 2021	MW302	5.59
With Hana off helping her sister move in and Crosby having returned to Oklahoma to recover from his gunshot wounds, the Fugitive Task Force welcome Kristin Gaines who has officially joined the team. When three people are killed in a Washington D.C. hotel, one of the victims also a federal police officer, the team search for a motive for the killings and discover a possible connection to the January 6 United States Capitol attack. They learn that the receptionist, Calie Martin had correlated the IDs of several customers to those of most wanted from the attack, supposedly to avenge her father who was injured during the attack. The Task Force track the suspect to Virginia, where also his brother and his wife is a part of a militant group. Tensions between the brothers escalate when Travis discovers Cole cheating with his wife, leading to him getting strangled. After two ambushes and a subsequent surrounding by law enforcement, Gaines talks the son down and the mother surrenders in favour of her son. The remaining brother attempts to shoot her but is fatally shot by Ortiz while LaCroix and Sarah deal with the aftermath of her ex's death - and the increasing challenge of keeping a teenage Tali in order.
32	3	"Tough Love"	Marc Roskin	Stephanie Sengupta	October 5, 2021	MW303	5.65
When the body of judge Stuart Weaver is found tortured in the woods in West Virginia, the team investigate and uncover a link to an academy that deals with tough love of their students, whose principal bribed the judge into giving harsh sentences to juveniles so they could take them on. Several more murders happen in a similar pattern to the judge, and the Task Force identify the perpetrator as Luke Hadley, who had help from former survivor Emily Wilton. However, as the pair make their escape from the Task Force, Hadley pushes her out the car window, with Emily dying as a result. Letters between Hadley and his now deceased girlfriend, point to an endgame against the owner of the academy. Barnes attempts to talk Hadley down, but he commits suicide. Gaines faces hurdles of her own as she resettles with her teenage daughter into an apartment in New York City, but loses her planned Airbnb due to shading dealings from the owner. However, her ex-husband Nick Vargas offers her and their daughter a vacant apartment in his building, neatly solving her concerns of proximity to him and their son.
33	4	"Inherited"	Romeo Tirone	Wendy West	October 12, 2021	MW304	5.50
When Chinese-American Carrie Chen is kidnapped after having dinner with friends, the Task Force investigate the possibility of her being victim of a hate crime. The matter is complicated when her husband Stephen Beck tries to meet a ransom and two presumed Chinese agents appear at the scene. Beck is later kidnapped himself while the Chinese Consulate deduces the agents' identities to be fake. Beck later breaks into his own lab to retrieve blood samples to aid the son of Frank Zhao, the man who arranged his and his wife's kidnapping, with his most recent scientific discoveries. However, the son reacts poorly to the treatment and the Task Force descend on the house and LaCroix talks Frank down. LaCroix and Sarah keep facing a rebellious teenage Tali, who Sarah discovers, was lying about studying with friends and LaCroix grounds her. He also vows to prioritize Sarah equally to his daughter.
34	5	"Unhinged"	Ken Girotti	Melissa Scrivner Love	November 2, 2021	MW305	4.97
As Hana rejoins the team while struggling to adjust the new changes in her life, the team find themselves investigating a deadly fire at an arcade in Pennsylvania, leaving two dead and one severely injured. Gradually they discover that Fred Duncan, the father of the arcade's manager, hired two people to torch the place to gain insurance money in order to pay his son's gambling debt. Said two people are later found dead alongside two more victims, with the latter of which having a connection to Angelo Carpenter, who served 35 years in prison for a rape and murder he never committed and is now seeking revenge against Fred Duncan, who was the real culprit, Fred's father, Fred Duncan Senior having paid those involved to frame Angelo while protecting his son, Fred Junior. He kidnaps his granddaughter, Abby and returns them to the Duncan residence to re-enact said events. The Task Force surround the residence, rescuing Fred and Abby but Carpenter attempts to escape, only to be shot dead by Ortiz while Abby is reunited with her mother and Fred Junior is taken into custody. Hana connects with Ortiz, deciding to go to the bar with him.: Tim DeKay (Angelo Carpenter) is credited as a Special Guest Star.
35	6	"Lovesick"	Jean de Segonzac	Ticona S. Joy	November 9, 2021	MW306	4.88
Cecil Walsh, a seemingly regular family man, murders his family after throwing them a party and goes on to kill a pastor and attack another man before abducting Nora Bryant. The Fugitive Task Force learn that all the individuals are connected to Walsh, with Bryant being his daughter who was adopted away to Eli Prant, who survived his attack. The pastor sat on the board of the Christian academy in Washington DC where his girlfriend Megan Taylor was sent to and where his daughter was born in 1986; the former later dying of a drug overdose three days before Walsh killed his family. Bryant herself learns that Walsh wishes for him to have the family he long wanted, and accepts his recount of her life story before attacking him and attempting to flee captivity. When Walsh finds her and attempts to kill her, the Task Force guns him down. Barnes finds herself struggling when her mother begins adding pressure to her marriage, with Charlotte disagreeing that she should act as a nanny for their daughter, and asks Barnes to take parental leave to substitute for her.
36	7	"Gladiator"	Tess Malone	Spindrift Beck	November 16, 2021	MW307	5.64
The wife of star professional basketball player Sonny Langer, Esme Langer, a famous lifestyle guru, is found beheaded in her own home. The Task Force is given the case and learn that Esme had a stalker, who snook around her children's school, and is identified as Mike Short by his roommate, whom he also kills before committing suicide, likely given his history of being a pedophile. The team also identify a burglar, Douglas Jones, who admits that he stole from the Langer house, but insists he didn't kill Esme. The Task Force discover that Jones was hired by a company who built a machine designed to combat CTE who Sonny also sponsored, and they arrest its CEO after Sonny's agent is murdered with Ortiz's own insight into boxing proving to be helpful. LaCroix deduces that Sonny killed both Esme and his agent and has now taken his children to the Hudson baseball stadium. The Task Force and local police surround Sonny and his children at the stadium, with LaCroix and Gaines attempting to talk him down, which almost succeeds before the tragic Sonny commits suicide. Sonny's dying wish is that his brain should be examined to learn about the extent of his CTE. Gaines finds herself growing closer to her ex-husband, but later learns that he has met a new woman.
37	8	"Sport of Kings"	Carlos Bernard	Richard Sweren	December 7, 2021	MW308	5.45
Christmas is coming in the LaCroix household. Byron is back and his presence seems to be having a very positive effect on Tali. Byron states his intention to purchase a proper Christmas tree. He expresses regret at not having paid attention to such traditional things when Jess was a boy. The team investigate when a prized Kentucky race horse is stolen with its groomer being taken hostage. They also learn that two murders at a country golf club and of the horse transport's driver, came in addition as collateral damage. The groomer, Tessa Sanders, manages to convince Willy Burke, Solomon Pensky's accomplice, to let her go and work together to get the ransom demanded from the horse's owner, Grace Roland. However, Tessa cleverly ditches Willy when the FBI is caught up on them. Initially, Roland stonewalls the Task Force citing the demands of no law enforcement involvement, but is convinced by Barnes and Gaines. With the horse's safe return, Roland decides to let Tessa get away with the money, expressing that she earned it for her diligence in caring for the horse. The episode ends with a joyful scene of Christmas spirit: Jess, Tali and Byron together – and enjoying decorating their new Christmas tree.: Terry O'Quinn (Byron LaCroix) is credited as a Special Guest Star.
38	9	"Run-Hide-Fight"	Ken Girotti	Elizabeth Rinehart	December 14, 2021	MW309	6.86
A trip to the mall for some holiday shopping turns deadly for Jess and Barnes when they along with the other shoppers find themselves caught in the middle of a shooting with the exits being rigged with so that no-one can escape. Gibson, Ortiz and Gaines are notified and in turn is the NYPD, who works with them to defuse and locate the bombs and finding the mastermind behind it. On the inside, LaCroix and Barnes secures the former's family along with other shoppers in a staff room and work with former cop Linwood to disarm the shooters and find more survivors. A total of five bombs are discovered, but the fifth one remains of radar for the outside team until Ortiz discovers a timer at the mastermind, Rob Murphy's house. Linwood risks his life to save LaCroix and Barnes from the bomb while Byron assists Gaines and SWAT entry through the roof. With all bombs defused and shoppers evacuated, Charlotte, who was also trapped in the mall, goes into early labor and gives birth to a baby boy. Linwood is reunited with his son and LaCroix finds himself supporting Tali who's going to boarding school in Canada, with her application having been accepted.: Terry O'Quinn (Byron LaCroix) is credited as a Special Guest Star.
39	10	"Incendiary"	Milena Govich	D. Dona Le	January 4, 2022	MW310	5.43
The Fugitive Task Force takes the case of Binh Dao, who utilised napalm bombs in a casino, injuring two and killing one. Initially they speculate his motives are political, but this changes when he targets multiple people who had a role in his upbringing, including the mother of his childhood friend. The Task Force learns from his stepfather that he shot his marine roommate for racist remarks, which was reported as an accident. They later discover that the stepfather gambled money away at the casino targeted earlier, which was meant for the mother's back surgery. Binh further targets his mother's former employer and heads to the lab that his mother once interviewed for because of her PhD engineering degrees. His ultimate motive is deduced to be standing up against the ones he thinks wronged his mother. The Task Force and lab security manage to stop Binh on their property and talk him into surrendering with his mother's help. LaCroix and Sarah see Tali off as she leaves for boarding school and share a movie night with his sister.: This episode marks the final appearance of Yaya Gosselin (Tali Skye LaCroix).
40	11	"Hunter"	John Murray	Rickey Cook	January 11, 2022	MW311	5.56
Hana and Ortiz’s relationship continues to develop with the two (now) roommates enjoying exercising together at a boxing gym. The Fugitive Task Force find themselves searching for a killer who's playing a twisted game of cat and mouse, collecting his victims heads as trophies. However, this is limited to his first victims, who are revealed to have a connection to abuse cases from boy scouting, one of them being the man who perpetrated the abuses. The killer, skilled hunter Wally Turner, starts to escalate and turns his focus to other sexual predators, killing two after a 'game' in a warehouse and bringing another to the woods behind a diner. The Task Force are astonished to learn that Turner's psychologist aided him by giving him a new rifle and ammunition. They find Turner's latest victim tied to a tree and LaCroix attempts to talk him down, but Turner stays determined of his way of justice. Ultimately this becomes his downfall as on Jess's command and Barnes's signal, the SWAT team accompanying them use smoke canisters to prevent Turner from aiming which gives Ortiz enough time to locate Turner and shoot him dead. Back at Hana’s apartment, she and Ortiz enjoy a meal together. Ortiz learns that Hana is adopted and encourages her to send her drafted email to her biological mother, which she ultimately does.
41	12	"El Pincho"	Ludovic Littee	Wendy West	February 1, 2022	MW312	5.91
When notorious Colombian drug lord Estevan Martin Maldonado manages to escape from a Pennsylvania prison by helicopter, the team are given the assignment of searching for him, and works with the DEA's Greg Galson. The utterly ruthless Maldonado leaves several murders in his wake, including his co-conspirator, Charlie Simmich, a prison guard who Maldonado had convinced he was in love with. The Task Force and DEA secure Maldonado's wife, who refuses to cooperate as she is rightly terrified of him and his cartel. Jess LaCroix refuses to use Maldonado’s notorious nickname of ‘El Pincho’ (the Skewer) believing it affords him a level of undeserved faux celebrity. Gaines follows US Marshals' deputy Tara McPherson's lead on a possible location of Maldonado's stash house, where they almost take him out before he escapes. The Task Force promptly arrests DEA Agent Galson after he refuses to shoot Maldonado, also revealing he was on his payroll and that he has a child. They finally track Maldonado to a convent, which serves as a front for a drug smuggling tunnel to New York. He takes Gaines hostage and down to the tunnels, where she stabs him to disable him. Gaines reveals to her ex-husband the trauma that happened to her during her last undercover assignment and that she was very close to breaking just before she was freed.
42	13	"Overlooked"	Milena Govich	Stephanie Sengupta	February 22, 2022	MW313	5.70
The Fugitive Task Force investigate the double homicide of the mother and daughter of the high ranking Osterholm family in a small town in Maryland, whose husband and father Daniel Osterholm is on the run for involvement in an embezzlement scheme. Daniel is later found dead in his own car and his friend admits that he forced his gun against him so he could shoot himself, but his prints are not found at the scene. When Craig Osterholm, the son, is kidnapped at his aunt's house, the Task Force learns that he was notorious on the dating scene and was involved in the disappearance of Brittany Walsh, whose father, Caleb, is responsible for the murders. Caleb forces Craig to confess for Brittany's death, which he claims was an accident and reveals her body in a freezer. LaCroix talks him down, and further consequences ensues with the sheriff resigning for lack of investigation and protecting the Osterholms, Craig arrested for killing Brittany and Caleb himself for his murders. Jess takes advantage of his own empty nest to properly court Sarah and invites her out for a dance.
43	14	"Shattered"	Lisa Demaine	Elizabeth Rinehart	March 8, 2022	MW314	5.55
LaCroix and the Task Force search for Harley Ross, the abusive boyfriend of Lucy Carver, who killed Dr. Darien Johnson and his family in the search for her. They learn that Lucy sought sanctuary and protection from a covert website specialising in domestic abuse victims, and Ross continues his killing spree of people who would have insight to her whereabouts. They manage to save her handler, Alicia Dutton, while also learning that Lucy had a daughter, which triggered Ross. With intel from her, Ross goes to the ER to find their daughter who needs a transplant due to her having leukaemia, and sneaks out when the FBI surrounds him. LaCroix finds a bruised Lucy in the parking lot and shields her when Ross re-exits and begins shooting at the two. The rest of the FBI team arrive, shooting Ross dead while learning that Jess has been fatally wounded after Ross shot him in the neck. The ER personnel at the hospital attempt to treat Jess but he presumably dies off screen, devastating the entire team. Barnes and Gibson informs Sarah of LaCroix's passing, putting their travel plans on indefinite hold. Together, Sarah and Byron go to Canada to inform Tali of her father's death.: This episode marks the final appearance of Julian McMahon (Jess LaCroix) before Julian's death on July 2nd, 2025 while Terry O'Quinn (Byron LaCroix) is credited as a Special Guest Star.
44	15	"Incel"	Carlos Bernard	Zach Cannon	March 22, 2022	MW315	5.79
Struggling to come to terms with Jess's death, Barnes, Hana, Ortiz and Gaines are given the assignment of tracking down a member of the incelosphere, Erik Perwin, who has begun embarking on a murder spree, targeting the people he believes never even gave him a chance. The incelosphere is in an uproar and another member, Jericho Brown, shoots up a saloon and seeks to work together with Perwin. They target a fashion show, where Perwin takes his idol model Chance Robbins hostage while Brown is shot when he brandishes his weapon. Gaines distracts Perwin, until Robbins breaks free himself and Ortiz subsequently tackles Perwin. Isobel Castille checks in on the team upon giving them the assignment, and the team decides to help Sarah finish the painted walls in her and Jess' home and share a meal with her and Byron, sharing a toast to Jess.: Terry O'Quinn (Byron LaCroix) is credited as a Special Guest Star.
45	16	"Decriminalized"	Tim Busfield	Melissa Scrivner Love	March 29, 2022	MW316	5.84
When married couple Marianne and Will Conway, who grow illegal marijuana, kill their employees, the team head to Vermont to investigate and find the couple. Along the way, they learn that their operational application for marijuana has been rejected and that much of their personal information remain cryptic. Gibson and Gaines are trapped in their marijuana cellar when the couple returns home for seeds used as insurance, but Barnes frees them. From analogue records, they learn that Marianne is the daughter of Russian mobster Vasily Matrushok, whom they suspect ordered their daughter's kidnapping, only to learn that he retired longtime ago and left the mob's leadership to Marianne's sister Laura. Marianne and Will meet her at a secret marijuana site that Will set up, and she hands over their daughter in return for their seeds, but quickly goes back on her word just as the Task Force arrive with the resulting gunfight seeing Will and Laura being shot dead and Marianne being arrested while the couple's daughter is rescued. Barnes contemplates seeking maternity leave to be more present in her newborn son's life, which Castille accepts just as the CID's announcement of a new Task Force leader comes through.: Alana De La Garza (Isobel Castille) is credited as a Special Guest Star.
46	17	"Covenant"	Ken Girotti	David Hudgins & Spindrift Beck	April 12, 2022	MW317	5.43
The team are introduced to their new leader, Remy Scott who's returned to live in New York, just as they begin to investigate the supposed abduction of teenage girl Lillie Jones. They soon learn that she went voluntarily along with her troubled boyfriend Jeremy Hamm as both their parents are found dead and later also a private investigator. Both Hamm and Jones have ties to the Covenant church and Intentions rehab facility, with the former in practise being a cult. When the pastor is found dead, they suspect his wife killed him as they learn from an undercover IRS agent that the church was suspected to be involved in tax evasion. Lillie is also revealed to be pregnant and scheduled to be married to Jeremy in a ceremony held by one of the rehab center's leaders Ken Clymer. On scene, Hamm is found dead and they track a rental vehicle to a motel, where Pat Mitchell, the pastor's wife, is arrested and Lillie saved, Remy theorizing that Pat couldn't have children naturally. Scott invites the team out to throw axes and drink, and also shares the story of his brother Mikey.: This episode marks the debut appearance of Dylan McDermott (Remy Scott)
47	18	"Reaper"	Alex Zakrzewski	Elizabeth Rinehart & D. Dona Le	April 19, 2022	MW318	5.25
The Task Force are called in to investigate when army veteran turned journalist Art Weller is found murdered in a Washington DC motel room. When they go to question his army friend, he is shot by a sniper in an ensuing panic. Later a renowned Afghan author who praises the US withdrawal from Afghanistan is abducted and executed on a live stream. The team soon identify the fugitive as Taliban operative Badi Wazeer, who killed Weller and his friend for their involvement in a 2012 drone strike that was covered up. Wazeer joins forces with US veteran Joe Haas, who also shares disdain for the botched withdrawal. Further clues reveals the two are planning a terrorism attack against a MIT science event for Afghan women. They take out Joe and Wazeer and subsequently the drone used to perpetrate the attack. Gibson receives news about her biological mother in New Zealand who recently passed away, in addition to a surprise visit by her half-brother.
48	19	"Whack Job"	Cory Bowles	Richard Sweren & Ryan Causey	April 26, 2022	MW319	5.44
The Task Force investigate a home invasion gone wrong which led to the death of a witness in witness protection and his daughter injured. They learn that the witness, Larry Lewis, was in relationship with NYPD officer Janine Viano, who is renowned for helping domestic violence victims, who seemingly has no knowledge of her husband's prior history and witness protection status. The fugitive is later identified as Kyra McCall, who attended the same gym as Viano, who had also tasked her to take out Lewis and his daughter. Viano visits the crisis center McCall resides at and kills her when she fails to take out the daughter for the second time. She goes to her partner, Justin Hill, asking him to take her across the Canadian border. Half way there, Hill stops the car and surrenders to the Task Force, and Viano is arrested when she attempts to flee. Scott visits his sister Claire, who is taking care of their mother. However, her Alzheimer's hinders her in remembering him and he presents a care home option to Claire. She decides to accept the offer when he reveals that their mother blames him for their brother's death when they were younger.
49	20	"Greatest Hits"	Ken Girotti	Stephanie Sengupta & Zach Cannon	May 10, 2022	MW320	5.28
In 1989, a notorious gangster is killed at a drive-by fast food chain by hitman Jackie "The Fox" Bianchi. In 2022, a mother and her two young sons are killed in a similar fashion at the same location. Shortly after, three people are killed at a funeral, again replicating a hit perpetrated by Bianchi. The Task Force enlist the help of Terry Daniels, the former lead investigator from Organised Crime in the case against Bianchi, to utilise inner mafia sources to get ahead of the copy cat, Joey Messina, who idolises Bianchi. Scott attempts to convince judge April Brooks to sign off on a warrant to retrieve info from Bianchi's podcast despite him being presumed dead in 1992. The application is denied, but the team deduce that Bianchi is alive and resides in Las Vegas based on a cooking video. Scott's ex-wife Carmen from the LVMPD aids in the raid and arrest of Bianchi. Brooks signs of on a revised deal for Bianchi's assistance to lure out Messina. Messina changes meeting locations, but Bianchi utilises him as a means to escape, but is arrested and Messina is gunned down after refusing to surrender. With encouragement from Carmen, Scott decides to seek out Brooks, whom he has developed a small fascination for.: Wendy Moniz, as Judge Brooks, begins a short (4 episodes) run as a love interest for the character of Remy Scott.
50	21	"Inheritance"	Jean de Segonzac	Gina Gionfriddo & Ticona S. Joy	May 17, 2022	MW321	5.46
When Cassandra Mason, a female con artist pretending to be a personal trainer murders a wealthy couple from the East Hamptons, she goes on the run and murders the ones she thinks could expose her past. The Task Force struggle to pinpoint her real identity, linking Jenny Bentz to a private school Treetops, who seemingly drowned at the school lake. Accounts from her mother confirms that Mason stole Bentz's identity, and her real name is revealed to be Dehlia Holby. She tries to borrow money from her sister, but is furious when the amount is not enough, and takes her and her mother hostage. Through the Treetops principal's brother, a lawyer who helped settle a case against him about Dehlia's relationship with the former. It's because of this Dehlia has been doing what she has in order to escape her past. Scott talks her down and shoots her gun to disarm her. Ortiz is asked by Gibson's half brother George to lend him money to pay back a drug deal debt. Having considered his options, Ortiz ensures that George does pay him back by having him work at his local gym.: This episode marks the final appearance of Miguel Gomez (Ivan Ortiz)
51	22	"A Man Without a Country"	Heather Cappiello	Teleplay by : David Hudgins; Story by : David Hudgins & Wendy West	May 24, 2022	MW322	4.77
A valuable painting is stolen from delivery by stealth assassins, with the owner, Trofim Sarkov, having sent his goons to get it back from delivery. Once the FBI confiscates it after the Task Force stops it going onto a plane in Massapequa, Sarkov ups the ante and orders a hit on the visiting trade commissioner, before moving onto the families of the Task Force members, threatening their lives. However, Scott orders a mass action by the New York Office, which secures them all in a new location. Sarkov's body pile keeps rising until he also sets loose sarin gas on a subway, which the Task Force learns of through an FBI mole Sarkov controls. All but one subway passenger is evacuated in time. Sarkov's demands for $500 million falls on deaf ears, while a bounty on him rises. He then kidnaps his own daughter, Polina who has opposed the invasion of Ukraine, forcing her to retract her opposition, then brings her to the Russian consulate to use as a bargaining tool. However, the Task Force stop them just shy of the consulate, and save her. Sarkov enters the consulate, only to end up being executed by gunshot seconds after entering the gates as punishment for not only failing to deliver Polina to them but for also bringing the unwanted attention of the FBI to them. Scott enters a relationship with Brooks and asks her out for dinner for the first time.

== Production ==
On March 24, 2021, CBS announced that the series was renewed for a third season, which premiered on September 21, 2021.

== Ratings ==
Viewership and ratings per episode of FBI: Most Wanted season 3
No.	Title	Air date	Rating (18–49)	Viewers (millions)	DVR (18–49)	DVR viewers (millions)	Total (18–49)	Total viewers (millions)
1	"Exposed"	September 21, 2021	0.7	7.12	—N/a	—N/a	—N/a	—N/a
2	"Patriots"	September 28, 2021	0.5	5.59	—N/a	—N/a	—N/a	—N/a
3	"Tough Love"	October 5, 2021	0.5	5.65	—N/a	—N/a	—N/a	—N/a
4	"Inherited"	October 12, 2021	0.6	5.50	0.4	2.97	1.0	8.47
5	"Unhinged"	November 2, 2021	0.4	4.97	—N/a	—N/a	—N/a	—N/a
6	"Lovesick"	November 9, 2021	0.4	4.88	—N/a	—N/a	—N/a	—N/a
7	"Gladiator"	November 16, 2021	0.5	5.64	0.4	3.24	0.9	8.88
8	"Sport of Kings"	December 7, 2021	0.5	5.45	0.3	3.01	0.8	8.46
9	"Run-Hide-Fight"	December 14, 2021	0.7	6.86	—N/a	—N/a	—N/a	—N/a
10	"Incendiary"	January 4, 2022	0.5	5.43	—N/a	—N/a	—N/a	—N/a
11	"Hunter"	January 11, 2022	0.5	5.56	—N/a	—N/a	—N/a	—N/a
12	"El Pincho"	February 1, 2022	0.6	5.91	—N/a	—N/a	—N/a	—N/a
13	"Overlooked"	February 22, 2022	0.5	5.70	—N/a	—N/a	—N/a	—N/a
14	"Shattered"	March 8, 2022	0.5	5.55	—N/a	—N/a	—N/a	—N/a
15	"Incel"	March 22, 2022	0.5	5.79	—N/a	—N/a	—N/a	—N/a
16	"Decriminalized"	March 29, 2022	0.6	5.84	—N/a	—N/a	—N/a	—N/a
17	"Covenant"	April 12, 2022	0.5	5.43	—N/a	—N/a	—N/a	—N/a
18	"Reaper"	April 19, 2022	0.5	5.25	—N/a	—N/a	—N/a	—N/a
19	"Whack Job"	April 26, 2022	0.5	5.44	—N/a	—N/a	—N/a	—N/a
20	"Greatest Hits"	May 10, 2022	0.5	5.28	—N/a	—N/a	—N/a	—N/a
21	"Inheritance"	May 17, 2022	0.5	5.46	—N/a	—N/a	—N/a	—N/a
22	"A Man Without a Country"	May 24, 2022	0.4	4.77	—N/a	—N/a	—N/a	—N/a
