= College Humor =

College Humor may refer to:

- College Humor (magazine), a U.S. humor magazine of the early 20th century
- College Humor (film), a 1933 musical film starring Bing Crosby
- CollegeHumor, a 21st-century U.S. humor website
  - The CollegeHumor Show, a television show on MTV based on the website
