= Peppermint (2018 film) =

2018 film by Pierre Morel

- Theatrical release poster
- Directed by: Pierre Morel
- Written by: Chad St. John
- Produced by: Gary Lucchesi; Tom Rosenberg; Richard S. Wright
- Starring: Jennifer Garner; John Ortiz; John Gallagher Jr.; Juan Pablo Raba; Tyson Ritter
- Cinematography: David Lanzenberg
- Edited by: Frédéric Thoraval
- Music by: Simon Franglen
- Production companies: Lakeshore Entertainment; Huayi Brothers; Tang Media Productions
- Distributed by: STXfilms
- Release date: September 7, 2018
- Running time: 101 minutes
- Country: United States
- Language: English
- Budget: $22.8–25 million
- Box office: $53.9 million

Peppermint is a 2018 American vigilante action thriller film directed by Pierre Morel and stars Jennifer Garner, alongside John Ortiz, John Gallagher Jr., Juan Pablo Raba, Cailey Fleming and Tyson Ritter. In the film, a woman becomes a vigilante in a quest for vengeance against the drug cartel responsible for the death of her daughter and husband.

Peppermint was released in the United States on September 7, 2018, to negative reviews from critics and the film grossed $53 million worldwide. The film was released in South Korea in 2019 retitled 'I am Mother.'

== Plot ==
A woman is engaged in a brutal fight with a man in a car and finally kills him with a shot to the head. Five years earlier, the woman, Riley North, is working as a banker struggling to make ends meet. Her husband, Chris, owns a failing mechanic shop. They have a ten-year-old daughter, Carly. Chris's friend tries to talk him into robbing Diego Garcia, a powerful drug lord. Chris turns him down, but not before Garcia has already discovered his involvement and ordered his men to make an example of him. Riley and Chris take Carly out for pizza and to a carnival for her birthday. As the family walk to the car, Diego's men gun down Carly and Chris in a drive-by shooting. Riley is wounded but survives. Despite her injuries, Riley can positively identify the shooters. The detectives handling the case are hesitant to pursue charges against the three, as they are members of Garcia's drug cartel, which wields considerable influence. Detective Beltran explains to his partner, Carmichael, that the last detective who tried to bring Garcia to justice was murdered.

Before the preliminary hearing, Riley is visited by the perpetrators' lawyer, who tries to bribe her. She refuses the bribe, but the lawyer notices she has anti-psychotic medication at home and uses this information to paint her as an unreliable witness. Judge Stevens, who is secretly on the cartel's payroll, declares there is insufficient evidence to allow the perpetrators to stand trial and dismisses the case, while the prosecuting lawyers do nothing. Outraged, Riley tries to attack her family's killers, but is tasered and placed on a psychiatric hold in a mental institution. En route, she escapes and vanishes. Five years later, Detectives Beltran and Carmichael arrive at the site of the carnival and find the three shooters hanging from a ferris wheel, having been executed by Riley. The executions attract the attention of FBI agent Lisa Inman, who meets with Beltran and Carmichael. Inman explains that before vanishing, Riley robbed the bank she used to work at, and that she has now returned, having stolen various assault rifles and ammunition from a gun store.

Riley executes Judge Stevens by blowing up his house, having already killed the defense and prosecution lawyers involved, deaths which Inman, Carmichael, and Beltran learn of, after the explosion. They decide to inform the media about Riley, which sparks a debate on social media between those who view her as a hero and those who see her as a criminal. Riley heads to a business that is a front for Diego's money laundering, where she kills most of his men, saving only one for interrogation. Diego realises Riley is responsible for his recent shipments going missing and resolves to kill her. Meanwhile, Inman discovers Riley has been living on Skid Row, learning she is the reason for the recent changes to crime patterns in the area. She finds Riley's van, which is filled with the stolen weapons, and learns that the people there see Riley as their guardian angel for keeping them safe.

Riley survives a trap set by Diego, follows his henchmen to Diego's home, and kills many of his men. When Diego's young daughter, who evokes a memory of her murdered child, interrupts her as she confronts Diego, she hesitates, and Diego wounds her and escapes. Inman calls Carmichael to Skid Row to wait for Riley. Carmichael, secretly on Diego's payroll, arrives and shoots Inman dead, then notifies Diego of Riley's likely destination. Riley returns to Skid Row, which is swarming with Diego's men. She manages to kill several of them and finds Inman's body. Using Inman's phone, she contacts the media and reveals her location, inviting both the press and the LAPD. She confronts Diego, stalling him long enough for the police to arrive. Diego kills Carmichael, believing he was the one who tipped off the police, and runs, only to be beaten down by Riley. Surrounded by police, Riley shoots Diego in the head and manages to escape. Beltran finds her critically wounded at her family's gravestone and has her brought to the hospital, despite Riley's expressed desire to die. Beltran later visits her, telling her that some people agree with what she did, and slips her the key to her handcuffs, allowing Riley to escape.

== Cast ==
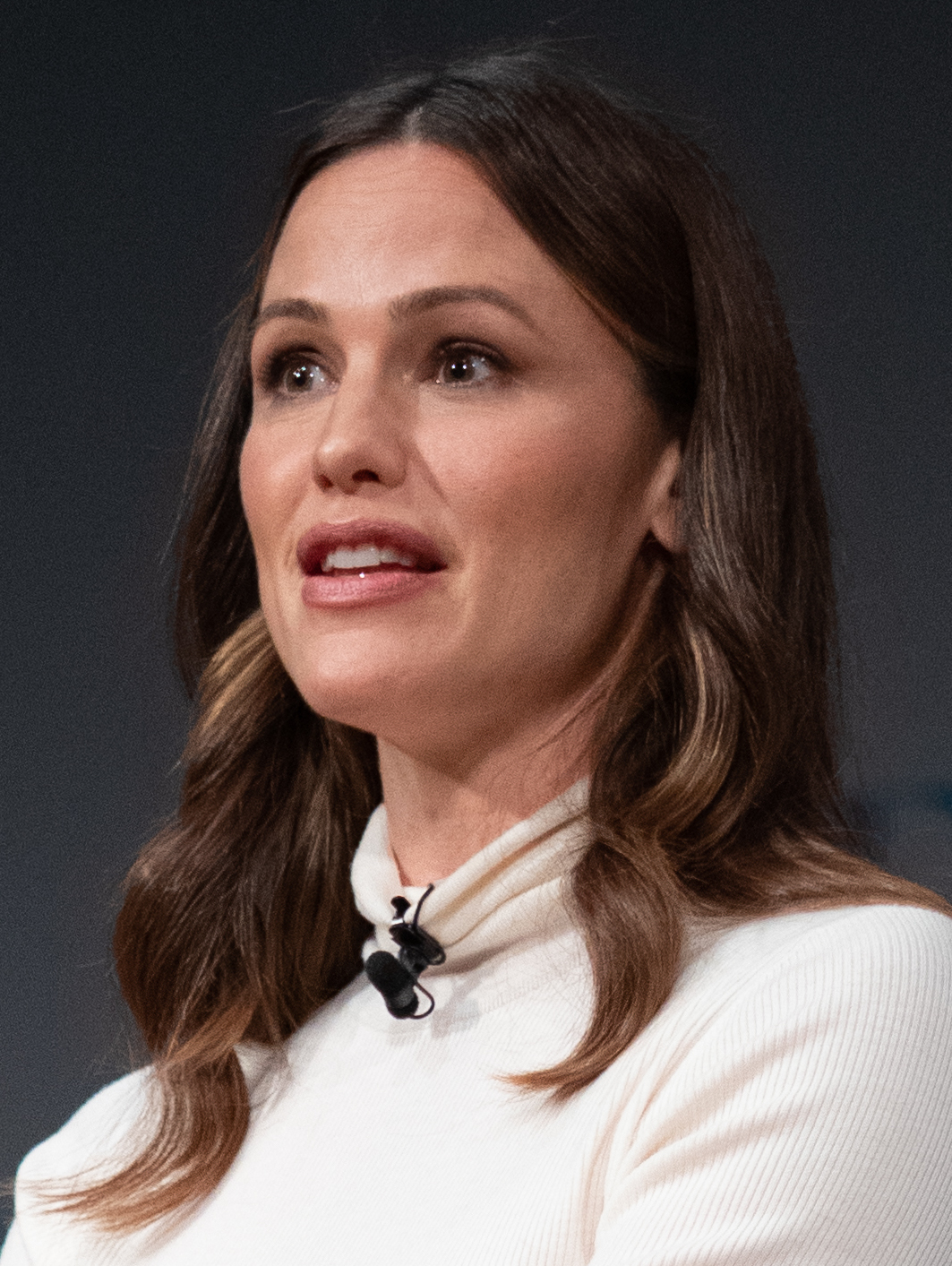
Jennifer Garner in 2018

- Jennifer Garner as Riley North
- John Ortiz as Detective Moises Beltran
- John Gallagher Jr. as Detective Stan Carmichael
- Juan Pablo Raba as Diego Garcia
- Annie Ilonzeh as FBI Agent Lisa Inman
- Jeff Hephner as Chris North
- Pell James as Peg
- Cliff "Method Man" Smith as Narcotics Detective Barker
- Cailey Fleming as Carly North
- Tyson Ritter as Homeless Sam
- Richard Cabral as Salazar
- Johnny Ortiz as Torres
- Eddie Shin as FBI Agent Peter Li
- John Boyd as Marvin
- Michael Mosley as Robert Henderson
- Ian Casselberry as Cortez
- Kyla-Drew Simmons as Maria
- Samantha Edelstein as Ice Cream Vendor
- YaYa Gosselin as Ana (Garcia's Daughter)
- Emma Thoraval as Homeless Girl (Maria)
- Hunter Wright as Homeless Kid
- Tate Birchmore as Boy on Bus

== Production ==
In May 2017, director Pierre Morel was attached to the project; he previously directed the first film in the Taken series starring Liam Neeson. The script, influenced by the Marvel Comics character Frank Castle / Punisher, came from writer Chad St. John, who previously co-wrote the script for London Has Fallen. In August 2017, Jennifer Garner was in talks to join the film as Riley North, a woman who, driven by the deaths of her daughter and husband, killed by a cartel, wages a one-woman war on crime using various weapons. The title of the film, "Peppermint", refers both to the flavor of ice-cream the character's daughter was eating upon her death, and the eventual alias taken by her as she embarks on her crusade. Filming took place at various locations in California over fifty days.

Stunt coordinator Don Lee previously worked with Garner on Daredevil and Elektra. Garner trained for three months to prepare. Training included dance, cardio and weight training, boxing workouts, artillery sessions, and stunt work with her longtime double, Shauna Duggins.

== Release ==
The film premiered at the Regal Cinemas L.A. Live Stadium 14 in Los Angeles on August 28, 2018. Ahead of the release of the film Garner received a star on the Hollywood Walk of Fame. The film went on general release in the United States on September 7, 2018.

== Reception ==
=== Box office ===
Peppermint grossed $35.4 million in the United States and Canada, and $18.4 million in other territories, for a total worldwide gross of $53.8 million, against a production budget of $22.8 million, to $25 million.

In the United States and Canada, Peppermint was released alongside The Nun and God Bless the Broken Road, and was projected to gross $10–13 million from 2,980 theaters in its opening weekend. The film made $4.7 million on its first day, including $800,000 from Thursday night previews. It went on to debut to $13.4 million, finishing second at the box office, behind The Nun.

=== Critical response ===
On Rotten Tomatoes, the film holds an approval rating of 13% based on 150 reviews, and an average rating of 3.6/10. The website's critical consensus reads, "Far from refreshing, Peppermint wastes strong work from Jennifer Garner on a dreary vigilante-revenge story that lacks unique twists or visceral thrills." On Metacritic, the film has a weighted average score of 29 out of 100, based on 26 critics, indicating "generally unfavorable reviews". Audiences polled by CinemaScore gave the film an average grade of "B+" on an A+ to F scale.

Frank Scheck of The Hollywood Reporter called the film "Death Wish on steroids", and said it "lacks subtlety and anything even remotely resembling credibility, but, like its heroine, it certainly gets the job done". IndieWire's Jude Dry gave the film a "C+". He wrote that Garner deserves to be in better films, and said the film is a "rare return to form for Garner, who doles out her vigilante justice with effortless charm. Unfortunately, that's about the only reason to see Peppermint".

Richard Roeper of the Chicago Sun-Times gave the film two out of four stars, writing, "In the stylishly directed but gratuitously nasty and cliché-riddled Peppermint, Garner plays essentially two characters cut from the same person." Writing for TheWrap, Todd Gilchrist said that Peppermint "ultimately possesses the stale predictability of an unwrapped candy discovered at the bottom of a purse." Andrew Barker of Variety wrote: "Garner gives everything that is asked of her, from brute physicality to dewy-eyed tenderness, but this half-witted calamity botches just about everything else. Drably by-the-numbers except for the moments where it goes gobsmackingly off-the-rails, Peppermint misfires from start to finish." Emily Yoshida of New York Magazine wrote: "There was a time when a woman being the star of her own bad action franchise could have been considered the apex of progress, but that time is past." Yoshida criticizes the lack of originality in the film and says that casting Garner is not enough to change that.

=== Accolades ===
Year	Award	Category	Recipient	Result
2019	EDA Special Mention Awards	Actress Most in Need of a New Agent	Jennifer Garner	Nominated
2019	Golden Raspberry Awards	Worst Actress	Jennifer Garner	Nominated
2019	Houston Film Critics Society Awards	Best Worst Film	Peppermint	Nominated
2019	Young Entertainer Awards	Best Supporting Young Actor – Feature Film	Tate Birchmore	Nominated
