= A Big Bold Beautiful Journey =

2025 American film by Kogonada

- Theatrical release poster
- Directed by: Kogonada
- Written by: Seth Reiss
- Produced by: Bradley Thomas; Ryan Friedkin; Youree Henley; Seth Reiss
- Starring: Colin Farrell; Margot Robbie; Kevin Kline; Phoebe Waller-Bridge
- Cinematography: Benjamin Loeb
- Edited by: Susan E. Kim; Jonathan Alberts
- Music by: Joe Hisaishi
- Production companies: Columbia Pictures; Imperative Entertainment; 30West
- Distributed by: Sony Pictures Releasing
- Release dates: September 17, 2025 (Philippines); September 19, 2025 (United States)
- Running time: 109 minutes
- Country: United States
- Language: English
- Budget: $40–45 million
- Box office: $20.2 million

A Big Bold Beautiful Journey is a 2025 American romantic fantasy film directed by Kogonada and written by Seth Reiss. The film stars Margot Robbie, Colin Farrell, Kevin Kline, and Phoebe Waller-Bridge.

A Big Bold Beautiful Journey was first released in the Philippines on September 17, 2025, and was released in the United States by Sony Pictures Releasing on September 19, 2025. The film received mixed reviews from critics and was a box office bomb, grossing $20.2 million against a $45 million net budget.

== Plot ==
When his car is clamped, David visits a peculiar "Car Rental Company" where he is given the only model of car offered, a 1994 Saturn SL with a special GPS. Driving to a friend's wedding, David is introduced to Sarah, who is uninterested in marriage or relationships, while David, who emigrated from Ireland as a teenager, reveals his childhood dream was becoming a husband and father. David declines to dance with Sarah, and she spends the night with someone else.

Driving home, the GPS directs David to a rest stop Burger King where he runs into Sarah. Despite their flirtation, she remains pessimistic about relationships. Ready to go their separate ways, they discover they both rented cars from the unusual company. When Sarah's car refuses to start, David's GPS instructs him to pick her up, and they set off on their journey together.

The GPS guides them to their first stop, a mysterious door in the woods. Stepping through, they find themselves in a lighthouse in Canada David had once visited. They return to the car and reach another strange door which Sarah recognizes as the back entrance to her favorite art museum. Inside, they explore the paintings she often viewed with her mother who died when she was in college. Back in the car, Sarah remembers an enjoyable road trip with her estranged father.

Their next destination is a greenhouse where they find the doors to David's high school. Inside, he relives the day he starred in the school production of How to Succeed in Business Without Really Trying, with Sarah and his parents in the audience. He confesses his feelings for a costar and relives her rejection, but derails the show by confronting her onstage with hard truths about the future. Sarah joins the musical number instead, as the entire auditorium sings the pair of them on their way.

Driving into the night, Sarah urges David not to pursue her. The car suddenly stops and they find themselves in a black box theater displaying the doors to a hospital. Sarah confronts her guilt at sleeping with her college professor instead of being with her mother on the night she died at the hospital alone. While Sarah grieves at her mother's bedside, David comforts his own father who is anxious about the premature birth of his son. Driving off with presents from the gift shop, Sarah changes clothes in the backseat as David reveals his mother briefly left the family when he was a child. They agree that life can feel too short.

At a mountain overlook where they gaze out over the entire planet, David and Sarah imagine having gone to the wedding together, and share a kiss. They arrive at a roadside billboard with a door in it leading to a café. David's former fiancée confronts him, demanding an explanation for his ending of their engagement. Sarah faces an ex-boyfriend she suddenly abandoned. Each is forced to admit their romantic failings. They return to the road only to hit a deer but escape unharmed while the car is damaged. Sarah suggests they end the journey before they can hurt each other. David tells her he loves her, but she insists they are only experiencing a fantasy.

They spend a lonely night at the nearby Timely Inn while the car is fixed. David drops Sarah off at her car and they part ways, but are each taken to their childhood homes. As his own father, David comforts his fifteen-year-old self, while Sarah relives a happy night with her mother as a twelve-year-old. David returns the car, amusing the Cashier and Mechanic by suggesting they are matching customers with their soulmates. Changing her mind, Sarah arrives at David's address and declares that she loves him. They kiss, and walk together through the front door.

== Cast ==
- Colin Farrell as David
  - Yuvi Hecht as young David
- Margot Robbie as Sarah
- Kevin Kline as The Mechanic
- Phoebe Waller-Bridge as Female Cashier
- Lily Rabe as Sarah's mother
- Hamish Linklater as David's father
- Jodie Turner-Smith as the voice of GPS
- Chloe East as Cheryl, David's high school crush
- Jennifer Grant as David's mother
- Billy Magnussen as Sarah's ex-boyfriend
- Sarah Gadon as David's ex-fiancée
- Jason Kravitz as Mr. Nelson, David's teacher
- Calahan Skogman as Sarah’s groomsman
- Brandon Perea as Mike, David's friend
- Jacqueline Novak as Stacy Dunn
- Lucy Thomas as Amanda
- Shelby Simmons as Stage Manager

== Production ==
In December 2020, A Big Bold Beautiful Journey, written by Seth Reiss, was featured on the annual Black List. In February 2024, it was announced that Kogonada would direct the film with Reiss producing. Margot Robbie and Colin Farrell were in conversation to star. Later that month, Deadline reported that Sony Pictures had tied up at European Film Market a deal in the $50M range for the movie, described as "one of the market's hottest scripts". In April 2024, Lily Rabe, Jodie Turner-Smith, Phoebe Waller-Bridge and newcomer Lucy Thomas joined the cast.

Filming began in April 2024 in California. In May, Billy Magnussen, Sarah Gadon, Hamish Linklater, Brandon Perea, Yuvi Hecht, Calahan Skogman, Chloe East, Jacqueline Novak and Jennifer Grant rounded out the cast.

Kogonada has cited Howl's Moving Castle and Eternal Sunshine of the Spotless Mind as influences on the film.

=== Music ===
The film's score was composed by Joe Hisaishi, his first Western film soundtrack. The soundtrack also features four songs by Laufey, "The Risk", "Winter Wonderland", "But Beautiful", and "Let's Dream in the Moonlight – Take 1", and a Mitski cover of Pete Townshend's "Let My Love Open the Door".

== Release ==
A Big Bold Beautiful Journey was first released in the Philippines on September 17, 2025, and in Albania the next day. In the United States, the film was released on September 19, after being previously scheduled for release on May 9.

== Reception ==
=== Box office ===
A Big Bold Beautiful Journey grossed $6.7 million in the United States and Canada, and $13.5 million in other territories, for a worldwide total of $20.2 million.

In the United States and Canada, A Big Bold Beautiful Journey was released alongside Him, and was projected to gross $8–10 million from 3,300 theaters in its opening weekend. The film made $1.4 million on its first day, and went on to debut to just $3.5 million, finishing in sixth place.

=== Critical response ===
On the review aggregator website Rotten Tomatoes, 37% of 198 critics' reviews are positive, with an average rating of 5.3/10. The website's consensus reads: "Too solemn to have much fun with its high concept while also too saccharine for its wistful themes to resonate, this well-meaning odyssey never quite lives up to its title." Metacritic, which uses a weighted average, assigned the film a score of 43 out of 100, based on 45 critics, indicating "mixed or average" reviews. Audiences polled by CinemaScore gave the film an average grade of "B−" on an A+ to F scale, while those surveyed by PostTrak gave it 2.5 out of five stars, with 44% saying they would definitely recommend the film.

For Deadline, critic Pete Hammond writes that the film is "an uneven blend of introspective drama and high-concept fantasy that feels a bit lost in translation and doesn't quite work the way it was intended" while also pointing out that it's "slow" and "overly talky."

The film contains Burger King product placement, that was characterized by critics as "cringe-in-your-seat", and "rather disappointing".
