= List of FBI characters =

List of FBI television series characters

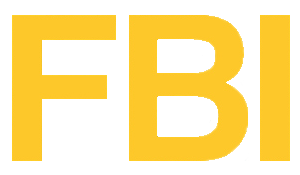

This is a list of fictional characters in the television series FBI. The article deals with the series' main, recurring, and minor characters.

== Main ==
Portrayed by	Name	Position	Years	Seasons							
Portrayed by	Name	Position	Years	1	2	3	4	5	6	7	8
Missy Peregrym	Maggie Bell	Senior Special Agent	2018–present	1–present							
Zeeko Zaki	Omar Adom "OA" Zidan	Junior Special Agent	2018–present	1–present							
Jeremy Sisto	Jubal Valentine	Assistant Special Agent in Charge	2018–present	1–present							
Ebonée Noel	Kristen Chazal	Special Agent	2018–2020	1–2							
Sela Ward	Dana Mosier	Special Agent in Charge	2018–2019	1							
Alana de la Garza	Isobel Castille	Special Agent in Charge	2019–present	1	2–present						
John Boyd	Stuart Scola	Senior Special Agent	2019–present		2–present (Note: Recurring in episodes 1–4 of season 2, main from episode 5 onwards)						
Katherine Renee Kane	Tiffany Wallace	Junior Special Agent	2020–2024			3–6				7	
Lisette Olivera	Syd Ortiz	Junior Special Agent	2024							7	
Juliana Aidén Martinez	Eva Ramos	Junior Special Agent	2025–present								8–present

=== Maggie Bell ===
Maggie Bell
- First appearance: Pilot
- Portrayed by: Missy Peregrym

In-universe information
- Gender: Female
- Occupation: FBI Senior Special Agent, New York City field office, Criminal Division
- Family: Unnamed father Unnamed mother Unnamed older brother Erin (younger sister; deceased)
- Spouse: Jason Bell (deceased)
- Children: Ella Blake (foster daughter)

Special Agent Maggie Bell is an FBI agent based at the New York City field office. In the pilot, it is established that she comes from Indiana and has been in New York City for three years. Maggie is a seasoned Investigator who is in charge of the team while out in the field. A former police officer, she was recommended to join the FBI after working with them on a kidnapping case back in Indiana. She is partnered with O.A., who joined the NYC field office after an undercover operation.

Maggie was happily married to reporter Jason Bell, who died in a car accident. Throughout season 1, she is seen secretly looking at photos and videos of Jason on her phone. She generally refused to talk about him to her colleagues, although O.A. seems to have known about her being a widow from the beginning. In the episode "Exposed", she finally confesses to O.A. that she has been having a hard time coping with Jason's death and has yet to clear out his closet. While investigating the murder of an investigative journalist in that episode, the team realize they are dealing with a professional assassin who has left a trail of bodies spanning several states and Maggie recognizes the man's face in a video she took of Jason, leading to her suspicions that the car accident Jason died in was engineered. She gets closure in the season 1 finale when she and her team apprehend the real perpetrator.

=== Omar Adom "OA" Zidan ===
Omar Adom "OA" Zidan
- First appearance: Pilot (1.01)
- Portrayed by: Zeeko Zaki

In-universe information
- Gender: Male
- Occupation: Special Agent, FBI New York City Field Office; Former U.S. Army Rangers, Captain
- Family: Unnamed father (deceased); Unnamed mother Amira Zidan (younger sister)

Special Agent Omar Adom "OA" Zidan, born sometime in 1987, is an FBI agent based at the New York City field office. A native of New York City, he returned to his hometown after a stint undercover tracking down jihadist terrorists. He is a practicing Muslim and is of Egyptian heritage, having grown up in Astoria, Queens where there is a sizable Egyptian-American community. While he proudly identifies with his religion and heritage, he prefers to be called "American" rather than "Egyptian". He has a particular distaste for right-wing extremists, having seen his faith utilized for all the wrong reasons during his previous undercover assignment and endured bullying and Islamophobic remarks in school after the September 11 attacks.

OA's encyclopedic knowledge of the Quran and fluency in Arabic have proven useful at times. According to Dana, he is the NYC field office's only Arabic-speaking agent with undercover experience.

Little is known about OA’s family as he is reticent about his personal life. It was mentioned in season 1 that his father had died a decade ago, leading to him acting as a father figure to his younger sisters and having the tendency to be overprotective of them. In season 2, he began dating lawyer Mona Nazari, whom he had crossed paths with several times while she was with the Southern District of New York.

OA graduated from the United States Military Academy and left the Army as a Captain. His military background has proven useful, as he is familiar with various types of explosives, ballistics, and firearms. He served on two tours in Iraq on Operation Iraqi Freedom with the 75th Ranger Regiment.

Series creator Dick Wolf was initially casting a Latino for the ambiguously named role of "OA.” Still, Zaki's audition tape impressed him enough to change the character to mirror Zaki's own ethnicity and background. Like the character, Zaki is a Muslim Egyptian-American who speaks Arabic and still has relatives in Egypt. Zaki has stated that Wolf and his writing team encouraged him to provide input on his character to add authenticity. The character was also originally supposed to be from Bushwick, Brooklyn.

=== Jubal Valentine ===
Jubal Valentine
- First appearance: Pilot (1.01)
- Portrayed by: Jeremy Sisto

In-universe information
- Gender: Male
- Occupation: ASAC, New York City field office
- Spouse: Samantha (divorced)
- Children: Abigail, Tyler
- Relatives: Nephew (unnamed)

Assistant Special Agent in Charge (ASAC) Jubal Valentine is the second-in-command of the New York field office. He mostly coordinates the activities and movements of analysts and field agents from the Joint Operations Command (JOC) room in 26 Fed, with many of the techs there calling him by his first name or "Boss" or "Sir". Jubal usually stays behind at the field office to run operations, even briefing the team on their latest case, while also giving information to the field agents and motivating the techs at the JOC to find information regarding a current case, while also dispatching the field agents to locations concerning a potential lead via an earpiece he wears. Still, he has been out in the field several times to assist with undercover stings. and operations while even participating in a raid and hostage negotiations. He trusts his agents implicitly and gives them the benefit of the doubt that they will rely on their training and good judgment.

Jubal's father worked for the United States Embassy in Moscow during the 1980s, with Jubal living there from the ages of 12 to 14, presumably during 1986 to 1988.

Jubal is also a recovering alcoholic, but was completely sober for years, often attending Alcoholics Anonymous meetings. As revealed in the FBI Season 3 episode, "Unreasonable Doubt", when his girlfriend at the time, Rina Trenholm, told him she didn't want to be his mistress, with Jubal also reluctant to tell his wife about her, the two broke up. This prompted Jubal to get wasted that night, and he ended up blacking out. Upon awakening the next morning, Jubal discovered that he was in his car in his driveway, behind the wheel, unable to remember how he'd even gotten there. He also found a huge dent in the car along with a lot of blood. Since it had been reported, he came to suspect that it had been an animal, and this incident was what prompted him to begin AA meetings and presumably get sober. Jubal remained sober for nearly ten years up until the FBI Season 5 episode, "Breakdown," where, following a medical crisis concerning his son, Tyler, he temporarily relapsed, drinking once again. However, he later stopped and was seen going to an A.A. meeting.

He has even assisted others in fighting their own addictions and currently serves as a sponsor to Morris Kalu. When Kalu was taken hostage while working as an undercover informant to stop drugs from hitting the streets of New York in the FBI Season 1 episode, "Conflict of Interest", Jubal saved Kalu's life by shooting and killing Tayo, the man holding Kalu hostage.

In the aftermath of 9/11 in 2001, Jubal, already an agent with the FBI, was assigned to a multi-agency task force that saw him working alongside the NYPD, as revealed in the Season 5 episode "Sins of the Past". During the FBI Season 1 episode, "Prey", it's revealed he also worked in Vice for an unknown period of time, and in the Season 2 episode, "An Imperfect Science," he was previously a member of the Threat Response Squad.

Jubal is trained in undercover operations, which he participates in during "Prey", "Fathers and Sons", and "Heroes". He can also beat a polygraph, as shown in the FBI Season 1 episode "Identity Crisis". In addition, he's a highly skilled crisis negotiator, as seen in "Safe Room", "Fathers and Sons", "Grief", and "Hero's Journey".

He met Jess LaCroix, the agent in charge of the FBI Fugitive Task Force, sometime in 2012, the two men working on the Haynes Spree Killer case, with Jess helping Jubal with his alcoholic problems. When Jess's wife, Angelyne, died in 2016, Jubal returned the help.

In 2014, while assigned to the FBI's Boston Field office, Jubal also worked on a case with Stuart Scola, and the two reunited in September 2019 when Scola was transferred to the New York field office.

When Jubal and Trenholm reunited in Spring 2021 during a case concerning drug cartel boss Antonio Vargas, they secretly began a relationship once the case had ended with the relationship continuing up until her death in January 2022 with it being revealed that Vargas had arranged for Trenholm's death in revenge for the murders of his own wife and young son who were killed and hung on a bridge in Mexico.

Like the main field agents assigned to the FBI New York field office, Jubal carries a Glock 19 as his main sidearm. Still, unlike all the other agents and techs seen at the JOC, Jubal keeps his weapon on him at all times, holstered on his right hip, presumably because he could be sent from the JOC into the field at any given moment.

Jubal is divorced, but he and his ex-wife, Samantha, are on friendly terms and share custody of their two children, Tyler and Abigail, although Samantha has physical custody. As part of their divorce agreement, she cannot move the children without his consent. This posed a conundrum for him when her new boyfriend got a job in Westchester County and she came to him asking for his consent to move the children out of New York City to the suburbs. He finally agrees after checking out the new house and neighborhood for himself.

As of Season 7, Jubal is revealed to be wearing his wedding ring once again and that he's gotten back together with his ex-wife, Sam.

Along with Zeeko Zaki (OA Zidan), Sisto had appeared in every single episode of the FBI series since the FBI series premiere episode, "Pilot," up until the FBI season 7 episode, "Perfect," which is the first episode he has not appeared in.

=== Kristen Chazal ===
Kristen Chazal
- First appearance: Pilot (1.01)
- Last appearance: Emotional Rescue (2.19)
- Portrayed by: Ebonee Noel- (credited as "Ebonée Noel)

In-universe information
- Gender: Female
- Occupation: Special Agent and Intelligence Analyst, New York City field office

Kristen Chazal is an FBI technical analyst and later field agent based at the FBI field office in New York City.

In FBI Season 1, she serves as a technical analyst, often reporting her findings to the field agents and Special Agents in Charge Ellen Solberg, Dana Mosier and Isobel Castille as well as Assistant Special Agent in Charge Jubal Valentine although midway through the season, she confides in FBI agent Maggie Bell that she wishes to become a field agent.

In FBI Season 2, Kristen becomes a field agent with her new partner being FBI Special Agent Stuart Scola although she usually returns to the Joint Operations Command or JOC to search for information on the team's latest case but in the episode, "Ties That Bind", Kristen finds her confidence being shaken when she makes a mistake during field training which results in Scola being shot with a paintball, an incident that has the instructor berating her over. Near the end of the episode, Kristen joins the team in attempting to arrest Jordan Cameron but is left badly injured when Jordan stabs her in the throat, Maggie tending to her while Jordan is shot dead by Scola and OA.

As Kristen in treated in "Fallout", she is temporarily replaced by agent Emily Ryder and even though Kristen makes a full recovery, ultimately being discharged in "Hard Decisions" while expressing her intent to return to the field, this has her teammates doubtful.

Eventually, during "Legacy", Jubal allows Kristen to return to the field and she helps her colleagues arrest the men of terrorist Sulaiman Mansor while OA personally shoots Mansor dead, Mansor having disguised himself as a military police officer and secretly infiltrated West Point so that he could murder General Carson, the man responsible for signing off on the strike that killed Mansor's family.

In the FBI Season 3 premiere episode, "Never Trust a Stranger", a conversation between Jubal and Castille reveals that Jubal received a text from Kristen, informing him she had moved to Dallas, Texas and subsequently joined the FBI field office there with former NYPD officer Tiffany Wallace later permanently replacing Kristen as Scola's partner.

=== Ellen Solberg ===
Ellen Solberg
- First appearance: Pilot (1.01)
- Last appearance: Pilot (1.01)
- Portrayed by: Connie Nielsen

In-universe information
- Gender: Female
- Occupation: SAC, New York City field office

Ellen Solberg is the Special Agent in Charge of the FBI New York field office.

Appearing only in the FBI Season 1 series premiere episode, "Pilot", she oversees the investigation into the blast that destroyed an apartment building in downtown New York and although the investigation lasts for two days, her field agents successfully apprehend Robert Lawrence, a white supremacist responsible for the attack.

After the case has been solved, she receives a phone from ASAC Jubal Valentine, informing her of a kidnapping in The Battery (Manhattan).

Due to her actress, Connie Nielsen being unable to commit the series after the pilot episode, Solberg was written out of the series and replaced by Dana Mosier (Sela Ward) who became the new Special Agent in Charge while following Mosier's retirement, she was replaced by Isobel Castille (Alana De La Garza) who in turn replaced Mosier as the new SAC.

=== Dana Mosier ===
Dana Mosier
- First appearance: Pilot (1.01)
- Last appearance: Closure (1.22)
- Portrayed by: Sela Ward

In-universe information
- Gender: Female
- Occupation: SAC, New York City field office
- Children: Unnamed daughter

Dana Mosier is a Special Agent in Charge of the FBI New York field office.

Prior to joining the New York field office, she was with the FBI's Behavioral Analysis Unit where she profiled serial killers, a skill she often uses during her time as SAC at the New York field office to give herself and the team an insight into the psychological mindset of a criminal. She is also married and has an unnamed daughter which was revealed during the FBI Season 1 episode, "Green Birds".

Mosier retires at the end of FBI Season 1 and is subsequently replaced by Isobel Castille who becomes the new Special Agent in Charge of the FBI's New York field office.

=== Isobel Castille ===
Isobel Castille
- First appearance: Most Wanted (1.18)
- Portrayed by: Alana De La Garza

In-universe information
- Gender: Female
- Occupation: SAC, New York City field office
- Relatives: Robert Castille (father), unnamed mother (deceased)

Isobel Castille is the current Special Agent in Charge of the FBI New York Field office, having been promoted to the position sometime after the retirement of her predecessor, Dana Mosier with Isobel's tenure as SAC of the New York Field office beginning sometime around September 2019.

Previously an Assistant Special Agent in Charge and a Supervisor of the Fugitive Squad, she also attended and graduated from West Point while even working a brief stint in Silicon Valley.

She worked in the New York field office with Special Agent Jake Reed which was her first assignment, Isobel and Reed being partnered together with one of their first cases being the Collier abduction case that occurred in Staten Island. She and Reed had a romantic relationship at the time but presumably broke up.

In 2012, assigned to the Alabama field office, she was one of the first responders at the white supremacist bombing of a church that saw many fatalities including three children, something that still haunts her as revealed in the Season 2 episode, "Hard Decisions".

She was also possibly in the Drugs Division and good friends with Special Agent Kyle Miller who was murdered at the hands of Antonio Vargas, the head of the Durango cartel in 2013.

Isobel has a strained relationship with her father, Robert who is General Counsel of the Legal Department of CMR Hotels.

She is fluent in Spanish and can also read it, often translating it for her FBI colleagues.

=== Stuart Scola ===
Stuart Scola
- First appearance: Little Egypt (2.01)
- Portrayed by: John Boyd

In-universe information
- Gender: Male
- Occupation: Senior Special Agent, New York City field office
- Significant other: Nina Chase
- Children: Douglas Scola
- Relatives: Doug Scola (brother) (deceased); Audrey Scola (sister-in-law); Alexandra (sister)

Stuart Scola is a Special Agent assigned to the FBI's New York Field office and also the current field partner of fellow FBI agent Tiffany Wallace. The character was introduced at the beginning of season 2.

A native of New York City and graduate of Princeton University, Scola is the middle of three children and has an older brother, Douglas, and a younger sister, Alexander. He worked as a stockbroker at Goldman Sachs for seven years before joining the FBI. The death of his brother during the September 11 attacks added to his disillusionment and prompted his decision to leave the corporate world.

Scola returned to his hometown after a stint at the Boston field office, where he first met Jubal. It was revealed on FBI: Most Wanted that he knew Sheryll Barnes from Quantico. His first partner was newly-minted Special Agent Kristen Chazal. Their partnership got off on a nervous start as she had no field experience and Scola often had to take the lead. Kristen later moved to Texas and he was partnered with fellow New York City native Tiffany Wallace, who had transferred from the Atlanta office.

During season 4, Scola first meets Nina Chase, who was brought in to cover for Maggie while the latter was recovering from Sarin gas poisoning. Tiffany was partnered with O.A. instead, much to Scola's annoyance. Scola eventually has a one night stand with Chase after a difficult case and later finds out he knocked up Chase in the process.

Scola presumably pursued a relationship with Nina off-screen and are a couple by season 5. At the end of the season finale, the 100th episode, Scola reveals that Nina had given birth to a son, named Douglas after his older brother.

=== Tiffany Wallace ===
Tiffany Wallace
- First appearance: Never Trust a Stranger (3.01)
- Last appearance: Abandoned (7.01)
- Portrayed by: Katherine Renee Kane - (credited as Katherine Renee Turner from FBI Seasons 3 to 4)

In-universe information
- Gender: Female
- Occupation: Junior Special Agent, New York City field office
- Family: Regina Wallace (mother; deceased); Erika Wallace (sister); Bryan Wallace (brother)
- Relatives: Terrence (cousin), Gary (uncle)

Tiffany Wallace is an FBI Special Agent assigned to the New York Field Office and also the field partner of fellow FBI Special Agent Stuart Scola.

Raised in Bed Stuy or Bedford–Stuyvesant, Brooklyn, she spent six years with the New York Police Department, specifically Narcotics and fell in love with becoming a federal agent while working on a joint task force.

Upon becoming an FBI agent, she spent two years in Atlanta before transferring to New York.

In the season 7 premiere "Abandoned", she decides to leave the team and move to Georgia to seek peace from the Siran case.

== Minor characters ==
Name	Portrayed by	Position	Seasons							
Name	Portrayed by	Position	1	2	3	4	5	6	7	8
Special Agent JT	Derek Hedlund	colspan="2" style="background: #FFE3E3; color:black; vertical-align: middle; text-align: center; " class="table-cast"| Recurring								
Ian Lim	James Chen	colspan="8" style="background: #FFE3E3; color:black; vertical-align: middle; text-align: center; " class="table-cast"| Recurring								
Dr. Neil Mosbach	Thomas Phillip O'Neil	colspan="2" style="background: #FFE3E3; color:black; vertical-align: middle; text-align: center; " class="table-cast"| Recurring		Recurring						
Ray Stapleton	Rodney Richardson	style="background: #FFE3E3; color:black; vertical-align: middle; text-align: center; " class="table-cast"| Recurring								
Eve Nettles	Nina Lisandrello	style="background: #FFE3E3; color:black; vertical-align: middle; text-align: center; " class="table-cast"| Recurring								
Kelly Moran	Taylor Anthony Miller	style="background: #EEE; color:black; vertical-align: middle; text-align: center; " class="table-cast"|	Recurring							
Trevor Hobbs	Roshawn Franklin	style="background: #EEE; color:black; vertical-align: middle; text-align: center; " class="table-cast"|	Recurring							
Elise Taylor	Vedette Lim	style="background: #EEE; color:black; vertical-align: middle; text-align: center; " class="table-cast"|	Recurring							
Emily Ryder	Catherine Haena Kim	style="background: #EEE; color:black; vertical-align: middle; text-align: center; " class="table-cast"|	Recurring							

=== Recurring ===
- Derek Hedlund as Special Agent JT, an FBI agent frequently working in the field with OA and Maggie
- James Chen as Ian Lim, an FBI analyst who works mostly in the JOC- Joint Operations Command under Assistant Special Agent in Charge Jubal Valentine. In addition to working in the JOC, he has been in the field many times, assisting Jubal and field agents Maggie Bell and Omar Adom "OA" Zidan.
- Thomas Phillip O'Neil as Dr. Neil Mosbach, FBI Medical Examiner.
- Rodney Richardson as Ray Stapleton, an FBI forensic technician (season 1).
- Nina Lisandrello as Eve Nettles, an FBI forensic technician (season 1).
- Taylor Anthony Miller as Kelly Moran, an FBI analyst (season 2). Like his fellow FBI analysts, Ian Lim, Elise Taylor and Trevor Hobbs, he regularly assists in searching for information concerning the team's newest case. He gets extra air time in S5 E11 where he is in a bank when it is held up.
- Roshawn Franklin as Trevor Hobbs, an FBI intelligence analyst (season 2- 6). Like fellow analysts Ian Lim, Elise Taylor and Kelly Moran, he assists in uncovering information regarding a suspect in a case the team are investigating. During the FBI Season 6 premiere episode, "All the Rage", Hobbs participates in an undercover operation alongside FBI agent Tiffany Wallace, only for Hobbs to end up being shot and ultimately dying from his injuries which devastates the whole team.
- Vedette Lim as Elise Taylor, an FBI intelligence analyst (season 2). Like FBI intelligence analysts Ian Lim, Kelly Moran and Trevor Hobbs, she too helps the FBI field team search for information regarding the latest case they're investigating. In the FBI Season 3 episode, "Liar's Poker", she is abducted off-screen at gunpoint and later sent to 26 Fed with a bomb collar around her neck which only stops at six seconds due to Special Agent in Charge Isobel Castille deciding to have drug cartel leader Antonio Vargas released from FBI custody. Despite Elise surviving, she later becomes psychologically scarred as a result and begins developing an addiction to anti-anxiety meds, something that FBI agent Maggie Bell later confronts her over with Maggie urging Elise to go to Assistant Special Agent in Charge Jubal Valentine who himself has had problems with addiction during the FBI Season 3 episode, "Trigger Effect". In the FBI Season 3 finale episode, "Straight Flush", Elise reveals that she has been transferred to the White Collar division of the FBI but by the time the FBI Season 4 premiere episode, "All That Glitters" has aired, she is shown back at the JOC- Joint Operations Command once again under Jubal's command, Jubal informing her that he's glad she's back much to Elise's own relief with Kelly Moran even smiling as well, implying Elise might have taken Maggie's advice and sought counselling for her addiction.
- Catherine Haena Kim as Emily Ryder, an FBI agent who temporarily fills in for Kristen when she is injured in the line of duty (season 2).

=== Crossover characters ===
- Julian McMahon as Jess LaCroix (season 1–2, 4), FBI Supervisory Special Agent (SSA) and Team leader of the Fugitive Task Force (FBI: Most Wanted). Has a history with FBI Assistant Special Agent in Charge Jubal Valentine, the two having previously worked together.
- Kellan Lutz as Kenny Crosby (season 1–2, 4), FBI Special Agent in the Fugitive Task Force (FBI: Most Wanted).
- Roxy Sternberg as Sheryll Barnes (season 1–2, 5), FBI Special Agent and second in command of the Fugitive Task Force (FBI: Most Wanted).
- Keisha Castle-Hughes as Hana Gibson (season 1–2, 5), FBI Special Agent and Technical Analyst assigned to the Fugitive Task Force (FBI: Most Wanted).
- Nathaniel Arcand as Clinton Skye (season 1), FBI Special Agent assigned to the Fugitive Task Force as well as Jess LaCroix's brother in law and the uncle of Tali, Jess's daughter (FBI: Most Wanted).
- YaYa Gosselin as Tali Skye LaCroix (season 1–2), the daughter of Jess LaCroix (FBI: Most Wanted).
- Tracy Spiridakos as Detective Hailey Upton (season 2), a member of the Intelligence Unit for the Chicago Police Department (Chicago P.D.) who temporarily joins the NY field office for an interagency training program. She is OA's partner while she is on the show due to Maggie being off on an undercover assignment which was written to fit in with Peregrym's maternity leave in season 2.
- Luke Kleintank as Scott Forrester (season 5), FBI Supervisory Special Agent who is head of the FBI's International Fly Team for the FBI (FBI: International).
- Heida Reed as Jamie Kellet (season 5), FBI Special Agent and second in command of the FBI's International Fly Team (FBI: International).
- Carter Redwood as Andre Raines (season 5), FBI Special Agent and a member of the FBI's International Fly Team (FBI: International).
- Vinessa Vidotto as Cameron Vo (season 5), FBI Special Agent and a member of the FBI's International Fly Team (FBI: International).
- Dylan McDermott as Remy Scott (season 5), FBI Special Agent and the Supervisory Special Agent/team leader of the Fugitive Task Force (FBI: Most Wanted).
