= FBI season 5 =

Season of American television series

FBI
- Season 5
- Starring: Missy Peregrym; Zeeko Zaki; John Boyd; Katherine Renee Kane; Alana de la Garza; Jeremy Sisto
- No. of episodes: 23

Release
- Original network: CBS
- Original release: September 20, 2022 – May 23, 2023

Season chronology
- ← Previous; Season 4 Next → Season 6

The fifth season of the American crime drama television series FBI premiered on CBS on September 20, 2022, and concluded on May 23, 2023, with a total of 23 episodes produced. The season featured the series' 100th episode as the season finale.

FBI centers on inner workings of the New York City field office criminal division of the Federal Bureau of Investigation (FBI). A three-way crossover with spin-offs FBI: International and FBI: Most Wanted take place during the season in episode 16.

The fifth season of FBI ranked No. 4 with an average of 9.52 million viewers for the 2022–23 U.S. television season.

== Cast ==
=== Main ===
- Missy Peregrym as Maggie Bell; FBI Special Agent.
- Zeeko Zaki as Omar Adom "OA" Zidan; FBI Special Agent and Maggie's partner.
- John Boyd as Stuart Scola; FBI Special Agent and Tiffany's field partner.
- Katherine Renee Kane as Tiffany Wallace; FBI Special Agent and a former NYPD officer and White Collar Division agent.
- Alana de la Garza as Special Agent-in-Charge (SAC) Isobel Castille; the team's supervisor.
- Jeremy Sisto as Jubal Valentine; FBI Assistant Special Agent-in-Charge (ASAC), who runs the office's fusion center.

=== Recurring ===
- James Chen as Ian Lim, an FBI Technical Analyst.
- Thomas Phillip O'Neil as Dr. Neil Mosbach, an FBI Medical Examiner.
- Taylor Anthony Miller as Kelly Moran, an FBI Analyst.
- Roshawn Franklin as Trevor Hobbs, an FBI Special Agent and an Intelligence Analyst.
- Vedette Lim as Elise Taylor, an FBI Intelligence Analyst.
- Shantel VanSanten as Nina Chase, an FBI Special Agent.

=== Crossover ===
- Luke Kleintank as Scott Forrester, an FBI Supervisory Special Agent and Head of the International Fly Team.
- Heida Reed as Jamie Kellet, FBI Special Agent and second in command of the FBI's International Fly Team (FBI: International)
- Carter Redwood as Andre Raines, FBI Special Agent and a member of the FBI's International Fly Team (FBI: International)
- Vinessa Vidotto as Cameron Vo, FBI Special Agent and a member of the FBI's International Fly Team (FBI: International)
- Roxy Sternberg as Sheryll Barnes, FBI Special Agent and Second in Command of the Fugitive Task Force.
- Keisha Castle-Hughes as Hana Gibson, FBI Special Agent and Technical Analyst assigned to the Fugitive Task Force.
- Dylan McDermott as Remy Scott, FBI Special Agent and the Supervisory Special Agent/Team Leader of the Fugitive Task Force.

== Episodes ==
No. overall	No. in season	Title	Directed by	Written by	Original release date	Prod. code	U.S. viewers (millions)
79	1	"Hero's Journey"	Alex Chapple	Rick Eid & Joe Halpin	September 20, 2022	FBI501	6.81
Working undercover on a sting operation, OA succeeds in getting close to the buyer, but things take a turn when the buyer's partner is murdered and the bomb they were after has disappeared. Via information from Curt, they learn that the man who stole the bomb is intending to use it at a building where the Federalist Society conference will be held. Meanwhile, Jubal finds himself struggling to fulfil a promise to attend his son Tyler's birthday party and eventually misses it. Tyler's mother, Sam, informs Jubal that four children came to the party, a relief for Jubal as Tyler is going through a tough time as a result of being diagnosed with leukemia.
80	2	"Love is Blind"	Jon Cassar	Alexander Maggio	September 27, 2022	FBI502	7.10
The team investigates a shooting at a pawn shop that leaves two people dead, one of whom is a police detective. The team finds a suspect who was on a drug run, but lost the drugs he was supposed to deliver and now has to save his girlfriend from his boss. Meanwhile, Scola and Chase are revealed to be in a relationship.
81	3	"Victim"	Carlos Bernard	Rick Eid & Joe Halpin	October 11, 2022	FBI504	7.41
Before heading to work, OA is robbed at gunpoint by a man and a woman. Though he brushes it off, the NYPD launches an investigation, which reveals that the couple were responsible for at least ten similar robberies. The FBI investigate the murder and rape of a young woman, which is just the beginning of a string of many more rapes and murders of other women.
82	4	"Flopped Cop"	Carl Weathers	Thomas Kelly	October 18, 2022	FBI503	7.11
Accountant Frank Leone is assassinated by two gunmen in the middle of broad daylight. His wife hands the FBI his laptop, which leads them to the notorious drug leader El Feo, who was a client of Leone prior to his death. The FBI learns from the state attorney that El Feo was going to be imprisoned, and Leone was most likely going to testify against him. They discover he had an informant on the judge panel, but she is later found tortured and killed. Wallace reaches out to a friend, Ralphie, who is the cousin of El Feo and a former cop and lost his brother to El Feo's drugs.
83	5	"Double Blind"	Alex Chapple	Claire Demorest	November 6, 2022	FBI505	6.88
The five year old son of Liza Peters, Luke Peters, is kidnapped and his nanny killed in the process. The team learns that Liza had once dealt business in Eastern Europe and unravel the fact that Chechen terrorists kidnapped Luke. Meanwhile, Chase tells Scola she is pregnant with their child, and is later reassigned to white-collar crime.
84	6	"Ready or Not"	Stephen Surjik	Heather Michaels & Thomas Kelly	November 15, 2022	FBI506	7.31
Marisol Lugo and Enrique "Kiko" Cortez are killed by a gunman in a park, and the FBI learns that Marisol had aspired to be an FBI agent. Cortez' girlfriend tells them that they were threatened by the MHB, a local Bronx gang, warning him against selling drugs on their territory, despite him not being affiliated with any rival gangs. Meanwhile, Maggie, who has returned from her hospitalization, faces uncertainty as she tries return to her duties.
85	7	"Into the Fire"	Gonzalo Amat	Joe Webb	November 22, 2022	FBI507	7.54
Trucker Clay Parker is killed when he tries to prevent two robbers from gaining access to his trailer. The robbers successfully steal barrels of ammonium nitrate, suspected to be utilised for a bomb. The FBI determine the Norseman Brotherhood to be behind the robbery, which Maggie is in the process of infiltrating.
86	8	"Fortunate Son"	Alex Chapple	Rick Eid & Joe Halpin	December 13, 2022	FBI508	7.39
Teen Trevor Logan departs home quickly with his father, who is shot by another driver in a black car. While his father is hospitalised, he asks Trevor to secure a bag of drugs, which Trevor instead takes to the FBI, believing they could help them both. Meanwhile, Chase reveals to Scola that she is moving to Los Angeles with their baby and asks him to sign a waiver, which in effect strips him of his parental rights. After some thought, he refuses to sign the document and desires for himself to be present in the child's life. Chase accepts and reveals the baby's gender to be male.
87	9	"Second Life"	Jon Cassar	Claire Demorest	January 3, 2023	FBI510	7.59
Chloe Rogers, a pizza delivery woman, is abducted while heading out to make some late night deliveries. The FBI find it difficult to identify her despite the small amount of information they receive about her from her boyfriend and college students. DNA samples from her toothbrush confirms her identity to actually be Annabelle Collier, a girl who went missing 18 years ago, and whose abduction Castille and her partner Jake Reed then investigated.
88	10	"Heroes"	Milena Govich	Rick Eid & Joe Halpin	January 10, 2023	FBI509	7.44
Kelly Moran finds himself in a hostage situation during a bank robbery on his way to work, but manages to alert Jubal. The NYPD and FBI quickly ascend on the scene and the investigation into the perpetrators ensue. The FBI identify them as Marco and Jennifer Salazar, whose target is a deposit box registered in the former's father's name. Further investigation into the father's background reveals that he owned several shell companies and dealt with money laundering to Colombia.
89	11	"Breakdown"	Alex Chapple	Alexander Maggio	January 24, 2023	FBI511	7.47
Two MTA workers die when they accidentally trigger a Botulinum toxin gas bomb hidden on a bus. The bomber is quickly identified as another MTA worker, Aurelio Martinez, who is subsequently found murdered. The FBI discovers that Martinez was paid to plant the bomb by Bin Zada, the alias of an operative working for a Houthi extremist group. Meanwhile, Jubal relapses into drinking after he gets potentially worrying news about Tyler's health.
90	12	"Protégé"	Stephanie Marquardt	Joe Webb	February 14, 2023	FBI513	7.20
The FBI investigates when a man is found murdered in an Opportunity zone in Red Hook. The victim is identified as Cole Dixon, an informant who was working for Agent Gwen Carter, Maggie's friend and former mentor. Gwen joins the investigation, despite Maggie's growing concerns over her friend's health.
91	13	"Money for Nothing"	Jean de Segonzac	Rick Eid & Joe Halpin	February 21, 2023	FBI514	6.89
An armored truck delivering cash to a strip club is robbed by a masked man in broad daylight. The same perpetrator is linked to two other robberies. Maggie's team eventually track down and arrest the suspect, Tom Hoffman. Hoffman admits to committing the robberies but explains he's being threatened by Mason Simonian, whom he owes $300 thousand. Simonian is suspected in several other murders, including the killing of an entire family in Queens. Meanwhile, OA starts to panic when his investments in cryptocurrency tank.
92	14	"The Lies We Tell"	Lisa Robinson	Rick Eid & Joe Halpin	February 28, 2023	FBI515	6.81
Off-duty diplomatic security guard John Reagan attempts to detain a man whom he recognizes but is shot dead in public. When the FBI tries to investigate the Reagan's background, they are repeatedly stonewalled by the State Department. The shooter, Luca Cilic, is eventually linked to a religious Croatian rebel group. The situation becomes even more perilous when it's discovered that Cilic has stolen an extremely deadly mutant strain of COVID-19 from a Hudson Genetics lab and plans to bring it back to Croatia. When his co-conspirator, James Levins, is determined to be the only man who can help the FBI find Cilic and the virus refuses to cooperate without proof that his kidnapped wife has been rescued, Castille resorts to using a deepfake video to trick him into cooperating.
93	15	"Family First"	Eduardo Sanchez	York Walker & Thomas Kelly	March 14, 2023	FBI512	7.16
Corrections officer Mia Lopez is shot in broad daylight. The FBI tracks the casings to a gun owned by Kenny Nelson, a member of a MC club, who reveals he sold the gun to a man the day before. Surveillance from the MC's bar reveals a company van, which was driven by Michael Landry, a former soldier who served during the Afghan War. More shootings occur against a judge, a police officer and a doctor, all involved in the case of Michael's sister Haley's death, who died in custody. Meanwhile, Tiffany tries to convince her troubled younger brother Brian to seek help for his increasingly erratic behavior.
94	16	"Imminent Threat - Part Two"	Alex Chapple	Rick Eid	April 4, 2023	FBI516	6.54
In the aftermath of the raid, Scott and Jubal escort Nina to hospital with Jubal later calling Isobel to inform her of the development, Isobel telling Jubal that Scott has agreed to spend the next few days in Rome to keep an eye on Nina which proves to be a good idea as Nina is later brought back into surgery after suffering complications from the wound. Despite Jubal wanting to stay in Rome, Isobel orders him back to New York to help aid Scola's operation. Back at the house, Scott clashes with Chief Inspector Granno who is unconvinced with Scott angrily telling that because of Granno's own actions, a man is dead and one of Scott's own colleagues in hospital. With Jubal having returned to New York, the investigation continues. However, due to their options being limited, Maggie decides to seek help from Remy Scott, the SSA in charge of the Fugitive Task Force. Thanks to Remy's past connections, Scola meets Andrej Chernin, Nico Sabalenka's boss and arrests him. An agent from the State Department later takes custody of Chernin with Jubal discovering that the agent is torturing Chernin. During an argument, Chernin breaks loose and commits suicide, resulting in the agent telling Jubal that if the bomb goes off, that's on him. The team soon discovers a HR manager, Allison Greene has been kidnapped and that Nico is connected to the operation. Remy and his colleagues, Sheryll Barnes and Hana Gibson arrive at 26 Fed where Isobel informs them of the development. With help from Maggie, OA and Tiffany, the team raid the penthouse, engaging in a gunfight that ends with the men being shot dead or escaping. Tiffany soon discovers a pad of writings in Russian with Remy translating it to a hit on the US President. Note: This episode continues a crossover event that begins on FBI: International season 2, episode 16 and concludes on FBI: Most Wanted season 4, episode 16. Luke Kleintank (Scott Forrester), Heida Reed (Jamie Kellet), Vinessa Vidotto (Cameron Vo), Keisha Castle-Hughes (Hana Gibson), Roxy Steinberg (Sheryll Barnes) and Dylan McDermott (Remy Scott) are credited as Special Guest Stars.
95	17	"Obligation"	Alex Zakrzewski	Claire Demorest	April 11, 2023	FBI517	6.84
Colonel John Sittenfeld is abducted and tortured before the abductors take his keycard to gain access to his home base and steal Javelin anti-tank missiles. When the FBI finds him, he dies after recounting what happened. The FBI manage to secure fingerprints from a trolly and find the driver, Ray Nichols, who refuses to cooperate, but eventually tells them a Mexican hitman bought the missiles to take out a witness scheduled to testify against a former cartel leader. Meanwhile, Scola and Nina discuss changing jobs, but Scola later decides to remain in his.
96	18	"Sins of the Past"	Oscar Lozoya	Thomas Kelly	April 18, 2023	FBI518	6.76
Trucker Vince Duggan is killed by his contacts after crossing the Canadian border. The FBI originally suspects he was drug smuggling, but his contractors are revealed to be terrorist planning a large scale attack in New York and that he delivered explosives. The team is joined by Jubal's former colleague Jack Lombardo, who may have a shady past of his own.
97	19	"Sisterhood"	Tim Busfield	Rick Eid & Joe Halpin	April 25, 2023	FBI519	6.80
Rafael Morales, a drug dealer and guard at the Emeralds bar, is found shot and dead in a federal park. The investigation coincides with Maggie's sister's return to New York, who is quickly involved in the case when her friend Nikki is kidnapped, which is linked to another dealer, JJ Gomez. Gomez tries to secure money from Nikki's father to pay a debt to the bar owner, Samuel Rowe. Erin goes in undercover to gain intel on Rowe's drug operation and Nikki's whereabouts. Meanwhile, Maggie grows weary and doesn't believe Erin when she claims she didn't snort cocaine while talking to Rowe.
98	20	"Privilege"	Carlos Bernard	Claire Demorest	May 9, 2023	FBI520	6.46
Allison Becker, the daughter of Senator David Becker, is abducted from the streets of Brownsville. His father tells the FBI that she thought she was being stalked, but said person turns out to be working to get suspicious pictures for a super PAC. They use one of his photos to discover where Allison worked, a halfway house, where a similar-looking girl, Katie Ryan, has been missing for three days. They take on both cases and identity the suspect as Caleb Vance who had an emotionally distant mother who deprived him of heat and food, even resorting to locking him in a toy chest.
99	21	"Torn"	Yangzom Brauen	Thomas Kelly	May 16, 2023	FBI521	6.58
A worried mother discovers her missing daughter and other teenagers dead in a forest, from overdose. The FBI learns that the position utilized stems from usage in animals, and are aided by organized crime to take down the Albanian mafia led by Fabian Shabani. Organized crime's undercover agent Val Sula utilizes his connection within the mafia to learn more about the dealings of the poison. The uncle of the distributor to the teens is revealed to be making it for the mafia. During the case, Sula's devotion to his Muslim faith puts the mission on the edge of breakdown, and he withdraws when he finds it hard to handle.
100	22	"God Complex"	Alex Chapple	Rick Eid & Joe Halpin	May 23, 2023	FBI522	6.54
Dr. Paul Hendrix, a renowned neurosurgeon, is abducted and later found dead in a federal park. Surveillance footage edges them closer to identifying the suspect after a retired army colonel is found dead in a similar fashion as Hendrix. A priest from a church identifies him as Frank Silver, who worked for the church as a janitor but was fired for erratic behavior. A psychologist determines that Silver suffers from a form of narcissism. The FBI investigate an abandoned church, where they uncover Silver's hideout and torture chamber and a new victim who is alive. Newspapers from his hideout helps the team determine that he targets individuals who works with life and death situations, and they determine that a judge is the next target. Meanwhile, Nina is hospitalized after an infection is discovered, and Scola is faced with choosing to save her or their baby. He ultimately aims to save both, but only Nina if all else fails. Fortunately, the doctors manage to save both mother and child. Scola tells his colleagues that he and Nina have a baby son, named after his brother who died on 9/11.

== Production ==
On May 9, 2022, CBS renewed the series for a fifth and sixth season. The fifth season premiered on September 20, 2022.

== Ratings ==
Viewership and ratings per episode of FBI season 5
No.	Title	Air date	Rating (18–49)	Viewers (millions)	DVR (18–49)	DVR viewers (millions)	Total (18–49)	Total viewers (millions)
1	"Hero's Journey"	September 20, 2022	0.6	6.81	0.2	2.78	0.9	9.59
2	"Love is Blind"	September 27, 2022	0.5	7.10	0.2	2.54	0.8	9.62
3	"Prodigal Son"	October 4, 2022	0.6	6.97	0.3	2.39	0.8	9.35
4	"Victim"	October 11, 2022	0.6	7.41	0.2	2.42	0.8	9.83
5	"Flopped Cop"	October 18, 2022	0.5	7.11	0.3	2.62	0.8	9.73
6	"Double Bind"	November 6, 2022	0.6	6.88	0.3	2.66	0.9	9.54
7	"Ready or Not"	November 15, 2022	0.5	7.31	0.3	2.57	0.8	9.89
8	"Into the Fire"	November 22, 2022	0.5	7.54	—N/a	—N/a	—N/a	—N/a
9	"Fortunate Son"	December 13, 2022	0.5	7.39	—N/a	—N/a	—N/a	—N/a
10	"Second Life"	January 3, 2023	0.6	7.59	0.3	2.80	0.9	10.39
11	"Heroes"	January 10, 2023	0.6	7.44	0.3	2.55	0.9	9.99
12	"Breakdown"	January 24, 2023	0.6	7.47	—N/a	—N/a	—N/a	—N/a
13	"Protégé"	February 14, 2023	0.5	7.20	—N/a	—N/a	—N/a	—N/a
14	"Money for Nothing"	February 21, 2023	0.5	6.89	—N/a	—N/a	—N/a	—N/a
15	"The Lies We Tell"	February 28, 2023	0.5	6.81	—N/a	—N/a	—N/a	—N/a
16	"Family First"	March 14, 2023	0.5	7.16	—N/a	—N/a	—N/a	—N/a
17	"Imminent Threat - Part Two"	April 4, 2023	0.5	6.54	—N/a	—N/a	—N/a	—N/a
18	"Obligation"	April 11, 2023	0.5	6.84	—N/a	—N/a	—N/a	—N/a
19	"Sins of the Past"	April 18, 2023	0.4	6.76	—N/a	—N/a	—N/a	—N/a
20	"Sisterhood"	April 25, 2023	0.4	6.80	—N/a	—N/a	—N/a	—N/a
21	"Privilege"	May 9, 2023	0.4	6.46	—N/a	—N/a	—N/a	—N/a
22	"Torn"	May 16, 2023	0.5	6.58	—N/a	—N/a	—N/a	—N/a
23	"God Complex"	May 23, 2023	0.4	6.54	—N/a	—N/a	—N/a	—N/a
