= FBI season 2 =

Season of American television series

FBI
- Season 2
- Starring: Missy Peregrym; Zeeko Zaki; Ebonée Noel; John Boyd; Alana de la Garza; Jeremy Sisto
- No. of episodes: 19

Release
- Original network: CBS
- Original release: September 24, 2019 – March 31, 2020

Season chronology
- ← Previous; Season 1 Next → Season 3

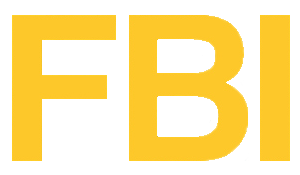
Text title for the series FBI on CBS.

The second season of FBI, an American police procedural drama television series, premiered on CBS on September 24, 2019, and concluded on March 31, 2020. Only 19 episodes were produced due to the COVID-19 pandemic in the United States. The season is produced by CBS Television Studios.

The season featured a crossover event with spin-off series FBI: Most Wanted, which took place a week before the season finale. The finale itself was also a crossover with NBC's Chicago P.D. with Tracy Spiridakos reprising her role as Detective Hailey Upton.

== Cast and characters ==
=== Main ===
- Missy Peregrym as Maggie Bell; FBI Special Agent (SA).
- Zeeko Zaki as Omar Adom "OA" Zidan; FBI Special Agent (SA) and Maggie's partner, West Point graduate, and a retired Army Ranger.
- Ebonée Noel as Kristen Chazal, FBI Special Agent (SA) and an Intelligence Analyst (IA).
- John Boyd as Stuart Scola; FBI Special Agent (SA) and Kristen's field partner. (Recurring episodes 1 to episodes 4, main from episodes 5 onward)
- Alana de la Garza as Special Agent-in-Charge (SAC) Isobel Castille; Mosier's replacement as the team's supervisor.
- Jeremy Sisto as Jubal Valentine; FBI Assistant Special Agent-in-Charge (ASAC), who runs the office's fusion center.

=== Recurring ===
- Derek Hedlund as Special Agent JT, an FBI Special Agent (SA) who frequently worked in the field with OA and Maggie.
- James Chen as Ian Lim, an FBI Technical Analyst (TA).
- Thomas Phillip O'Neil as Dr. Neil Mosbach, an FBI Forensic Pathologist.
- Taylor Anthony Miller as Kelly Moran, an FBI Analyst.
- Roshawn Franklin as Trevor Hobbs, an FBI Special Agent (SA) and an Intelligence Analyst (IA).
- Vedette Lim as Elise Taylor, an FBI intelligence analyst (IA).
- Catherine Haena Kim as Emily Ryder, an FBI Special Agent (SA) who temporarily fills in for Kristen when she is injured in the line of duty.

=== Crossover ===
- Julian McMahon as FBI Supervisory Special Agent (SSA) Jess LaCroix, the Team Leader of the Fugitive Task Force (FTF).
- Kellan Lutz as FBI Special Agent (SA) Kenny Crosby of the Fugitive Task Force (FTF).
- Roxy Sternberg as FBI Special Agent (SA) Sheryll Barnes, who is Second in Command of the Fugitive Task Force (FTF).
- Keisha Castle-Hughes as FBI Special Agent (SA) and Technical Analyst (TA) Hana Gibson, who is assigned to the Fugitive Task Force (FTF).
- Tracy Spiridakos as Detective Hailey Upton, a member of the Intelligence Unit for the Chicago Police Department.

== Episodes ==
No. overall	No. in season	Title	Directed by	Written by	Original release date	Prod. code	U.S. viewers (millions)
23	1	"Little Egypt"	Arthur W. Forney	Rick Eid	September 24, 2019	FBI201	8.83
As Kristen receives her badge from Jubal and starts her first day as a field agent and is partnered with recently transferred agent Stuart Scola (who worked with Jubal at the Boston field office) and the New York field office begins working under its new superior Special Agent in Charge Isobel Castille. The team investigate when a bomb detonates at a restaurant in Queens not far from where OA grew up. Although the culprits in the first bombing, Justin Murphy and Michael Moosa are arrested, things get even more complicated when one of the witnesses, waiter Joseph Nasser, meets OA, revealing himself to be an undercover FBI agent with another agenda, that being apprehending two Muslim youths, Karim Gamal and Rhami Maroun in the act of terrorism by recruiting them. OA joins Nasser's operation, but is conflicted about if it's right to let it happen, telling Maggie his memories of life in the time after 9/11. Despite reaching a deal, Karim Gamal and Rhami Maroun work with an imam to execute a bombing in Central Park, targeting various people. Eventually, Maggie and OA stop the attack from happening, Maggie defusing the bomb with just three seconds left on the time, the two young men being arrested while OA visits Karim Gamal, one of the youths Nasser befriended and promises to help him.: This is the first episode of the FBI series to have Alana de la Garza (Isobel Castille) now credited as a series regular and marks the debut appearance of John Boyd (Stuart Scola) while Jeremy Sisto (Jubal Valentine) who was previously credited under "With" now receives the "And" credit.
24	2	"The Lives of Others"	Alex Chapple	David Amann	October 1, 2019	FBI202	9.46
The six year old son of prominent blogger Stacy Harper, is kidnapped, forcing the team to look through her two million followers. As the team dig into the family's personal life and online presence, not everything is as it seems as during the canvass search, OA comes across convicted sex offender, Todd Crebins who is arrested but he has an alibi. The team later arrest Wayne Rydell, a suspect who had a stun gun and planned to kidnap Eli. With Rydell off limits, Jubal devises a plan: As Scola gives Rydell's lawyer the runaround, Maggie and OA talk in front of Rydell, revealing he could be sent to Rikers, Rydell giving in and telling them he found a black car similar to footage that appeared during the Hernandez park call. The team soon learn of Lisa Defacio, Eli's surrogate mother and whose own mother died two weeks previously with Lisa being the abductor. With two cabins to search, Jubal orders Maggie to one and OA to the other. During her search, Maggie encounters Lisa who's firing a shotgun and despite OA's orders to wait, goes head, convincing Lisa to surrender while saving Eli, Maggie and OA later reuniting with Eli with his parents, Drew and Stacy. As this goes on, Maggie begins considering how she's been coping with the murder of her husband, Jason while Kristen continues adjusting to her own life as a new field agent.: This episode marks the debut appearances of Roshawn Franklin (Trevor Hobbs) and Taylor Anthony Miller (Kelly Moran).
25	3	"American Idol"	Milena Govich	Mo Masi	October 8, 2019	FBI203	8.70
Congresswoman Valerie Caldwell who's running for president survives a car bombing that kills one of her bodyguards, Alex Peters. As the team investigate, they learn one of the suspects, Sasha Simmons has a grudge against Caldwell for burying evidence that could have freed her brother, Wayne. Jubal soon realizes that one of the guys, Ray Zhao is a member of the Chinese People's Liberation Army and a spy but he's innocent too. Kristen and Scola learn from one of the women who worked on Caldwell's campaign that Caldwell suppressed evidence and fired her own colleague, Len Barker with the team realizing Barker wants revenge against Caldwell. They stop him from targeting Caldwell during a campaign meeting at the Roosevelt Hotel. Maggie later puts her own admiration for Caldwell behind her, OA praising her for doing so.
26	4	"An Imperfect Science"	Jean de Segonzac	Erica Shelton Kodish	October 15, 2019	FBI204	8.75
During an event at a black nightclub, a white man opens fire, killing one and wounding a few bystanders. The investigation leads the team to the white supremacist group, the First Order whose threats the FBI apparently ignored. When a young man, Ivan Childress admits he carried out the shooting, the team believe it but Maggie has her own doubts and is proven right when footage shows the team are looking for a different suspect. As Kristen struggles between her responsibilities as an agent of the FBI and a member of the black community, the team learn the identity of the gunman: Jim Housley Dietz who targeted his ex-girlfriend, Patrice. With Patrice having gone off the grid, Maggie and OA race to her safehouse but are ambushed by Dietz who shoots and wounds OA. As Maggie scans for Dietz, heading outside, Dietz emerges from the rooftop and attempts to kill her, only to be fatally shot by OA. Later, in the hallway of 26 Fed, Isobel and Jubal talk, Isobel expressing to him that they should have taken the threats against the club more seriously, and wants to expand the responsibility for more thoroughness in investigating threats.
27	5	"Crossroads"	Charles S. Carroll	Rick Eid & Clare Demorest	October 22, 2019	FBI205	8.87
When Jim Russo, a commercial truck driver is kidnapped, the team begin searching for him. Despite his record and being a family man, they can't figure out a motive until they discover a dirty shovel in his truck. Kristen and Scola soon learn he buried bags of cocaine. The team arrest Miguel Boaz who is later revealed to be working for the DEA with agent Tom Brennan telling Isobel they're working on an operation to apprehend Jorge Madrigal, the leader of the Juarez cartel. Despite Brennan's assurances Russo is dead, Isobel doesn't take any chances, ordering Jubal to tell Maggie, OA, Kristen and Scola to raid the house which they do, saving Russo who's barely alive while Madrigal is shot and killed. In the meantime, Jubal meets his ex-wife, Sam who reveals she wants to move their two kids to Scarsdale, Jubal eventually accepting Sam's decision.: This is the first episode to have John Boyd (Stuart Scola) credited as a series regular.
28	6	"Outsider"	Stephen Surjik	Rick Eid & David Amann	November 5, 2019	FBI206	8.54
When a female jogger finds Wall Street investor, Brad Hughes dead, the team investigate, discovering Hughes had contacted the SEC about an illegal deal. Scola's background as a former trader comes in handy as he and Kristen begin scouring through the suspects, learning through Elena Bondar, she and nine other young women were used as assets by an Albanian gang to spread malware orders in order to get inside information regarding Wall Street trading. OA goes through his girlfriend, Mona who's an attorney to ID the suspect, Nikolas Christo. Bondar goes to meet Christo but is held at gunpoint. After Christo is arrested, OA meets Isobel in her office, Isobel telling him the head of the organized crime division wants to know how he got Christo's name and that he wants to meet OA at 8am the next day, warning him the head will not accept "no" as an answer.
29	7	"Undisclosed"	Emile Levisetti	Joe Halpin & Katherine Visconti	November 12, 2019	FBI207	8.87
When Robert Cabot, university president of Armstrong University and a board member of Cemera, a medical tech company is shot dead, the team investigate. At first, they believe Luke Wagner who has mental health issues is the killer as Cabot personally expelled Wagner from campus but Wagner's later cleared. The team begin digging further into Cemera's members, learning that its CEO, Corinne Baker has been attacked and non-fatally shot by the suspect. It's soon revealed that the man is Tommy Ward, a security guard and who was one of the witnesses. Ward recently learnt he was terminally ill and was furious, a former employee of Cemera revealing to Scola and Kristen that the scanners Cemera uses are faulty and when he confronted Baker, she fired him. Maggie and OA confront Ward as he reaches Cemera HQ. Despite their attempts to get him to surrender, Ward takes his own life when he walks in front of a truck while back at 26 Fed, Maggie and OA begin putting together a list of people who aren't aware they're ill and with Isobel's help, even get Baker arrested. As this goes on, OA meets his uncle who wants OA's own cousin, Ryan to get a job with the Newark Police Department. OA later reveals the honest truth, his cousin isn't fit to be a cop, disappointing his uncle.
30	8	"Codename: Ferdinand"	Alex Zakrzewski	David Amann	November 19, 2019	FBI208	8.83
When photographer Frank Webber dies in a car accident, the higher ups ask Isobel to have Maggie, OA, Kristen, Scola, Jubal and the rest of the New York Field Office investigate the circumstances surrounding the case. They later meet CIA agent, Collins who reveals that Webber worked for them taking photographs of suspected sleeper agents and that his wife doesn't know the truth and never will. It's soon revealed that the couple who reported the accident, Ben and Lisa Blake are actually Russian agents who are seeking to kill Farhad, the son of the Iranian defense minister who's in New York on a student visa. Maggie and OA arrest Ben while Maggie is accosted by a man who accidentally bumped into her car and gets asked out for coffee.: This episode marks the debut appearance of Vedette Lim (Elise Taylor).
31	9	"Salvation"	Alex Chapple	Rick Eid	November 26, 2019	FBI209	8.81
After an altercation with a student, Alex Williams, Patrick Miller disappears and is later found dead. Interviewing Williams, the team head to Max Bailey who's the ex-husband of Miller's girlfriend and who believes Miller is a pedophile after seeing him with an underage girl, Jessica Sanchez, a gang member from Mexico who's settled in the US and sought to get out of the gang, the D15. With Sanchez's help, they arrest the gang leader, Marco Gomez. Unfortunately, Sanchez is arrested by ICE who have an order of removal on Sanchez, Maggie and OA nearly coming to blows with the arresting ICE agents. Despite bringing it to court, the judge rules in favor of ICE deporting Sanchez back to Mexico.
32	10	"Ties That Bind"	Stephen Surjik	Claire Demorest	December 17, 2019	FBI210	8.47
When Hannah Bloom, the daughter of NYPD Detective Harry Bloom is found strangled to death, the team investigate. They discover that the killer's struck numerous times stretching from southern New York to the city. In field training, Kristen makes an error that has Scola get hit with a paintball, Kristin expressing concern when he doesn't chastise her for it. The team soon suspect Andrew Cameron might be responsible, Jubal revealing Andrew was kidnapped as a child and raised by a pedophile before escaping. Despite his mother, Leigh and Andrew's brother, Jordan that he's innocent, Andrew is interviewed. With the help of Sloan Wallace, a profiler from the BAU, they soon learn that Jordan is the real killer, Sloan stating that when Andrew was abducted, Leigh devoted her energy to him and ignored Jordan. They prepare to confront Jordan at a warehouse, only for Harry to interverne, complicating things. During the struggle, Jordan fights Maggie and attempts to stab, only for Kristen to intercept the attack, taking a hit to her throat before she collapses to the ground. Realizing the gravity of the siutation, OA and Scola proceed to fatally shoot Jordan while Maggie performs CPR on Kristen, urging her to breathe and look at her, ending the episode on a cliffhanger.
33	11	"Fallout"	Alex Chapple	David Amann	January 7, 2020	FBI211	9.32
In the aftermath of being stabbed, Kristen is rushed to the hospital as doctors race to save her life. With Kristen down and the team unnerved by what's happened, Emily Ryder joins the team as they investigate the murder of businessman Keith Gilroy who lost his position after he was accused of sexually harassing numerous female employees. things change when they learn that an assassin, Sarah Baines was paid to kill her. They soon discover that Ava Mercer, a young woman is actually his daughter who Gilroy had planned to include in his will but he died before that could happen, leaving the inheritance to the foundation to Lila Robbins who reveals she was a victim of Gilroy. Kristen later makes a successful recovery. * This is the first episode where Alana De La Garza (Isobel Castille) is now credited under "With".
34	12	"Hard Decisions"	Emile Levisetti	Joe Halpin	January 14, 2020	FBI212	8.57
The team investigate when a bank is held up but nothing's stolen. They soon discover that the contents of a safety deposit box have fallen into the hands of an infamous cyber criminal known as The Sentinel. The NSA later become involved, Isobel revealing to Jubal that Kenneth Bates who is Sentinel hacked the FBI's mainframe a few months ago, stealing the list of every CI the FBI Field Office has ever used including their names and families with Isobel stating if Bates were captured or killed, he'd release the list. Once he's been arrested, Bates asks to speak to Isobel and demands to be let go, telling her that if they don't, a bomb at the New York Stock Exchange will go off. With Kristen's help, Jubal who wants to protect Isobel who's still haunted by a white supremacist church bombing that occurred in 2012 when she was a member of the Alabama field office where the local authorities ignored the tips with the attack leading to the deaths of many people including three children. Jubal manages to trick Bates into seeing a live feed and when the bomb doesn't explode, Scola arrests Bates while Kristen is discharged from the hospital, returning to the FBI on a desk assignment.
35	13	"Payback"	Monica Raymund	David Amann & Mo Masi	January 21, 2020	FBI213	9.24
At the Osborne house, retired FBI agent Dan Osborne prepares a breakfast for himself and his 17 year old son, Jake who skips out. After learning Jake left his maths book behind, Dan goes to find him, only to learn that Jake has disappeared, leaving his backpack behind. Isobel who's friends with the Osbornes travels to the house to comfort Dan and Lori, Dan's wife and Jake's mother as Maggie and OA arrive to interview the two. They soon search Jake's room and discover money that leads them to Beth Kimball, a girl from Jake's school who was selling drugs with him. Emily and Scola later confront Warren Cooper, Beth's boyfriend who reveals he beat up Jake but let him go. CCTV later shows a man who is Sean Ellis taking Jake away, the JOC learning Sean is a man Dan previously arrested who was released from prison three weeks previously. Dan wants to assist in the investigation but Isobel denies him, telling him he should go home and that he and Lori should be there for each other. Arriving at the house, Maggie and OA learn Dan's gone rogue after receiving a text message from a flip phone. They soon track Dan down at the warehouse, learning that he and Sean are wounded, the two having shot each other. With Sean in no condition to talk, Dan begs OA to find Jake. In the JOC, the team go through evidence with Trevor Hobbs revealing that Sean has died on his way to the hospital. With leads drying up, Maggie and OA interrogate Gina Ramos, Sean's girlfriend who reveals that Sean was in debt to the leader of the gang, the Easy Eights. Realizing Sean whispered the word, "Brick" to her, Maggie finds out Brick is the street name of Russell McNair, the gang's leader. During the case, Jubal learns from Kristen that one million dollars went missing the night Sean was arrested as he tells Isobel Dan might have stolen drug money during his arrest of Sean, something Isobel refuses to believe. Descending on a safe house, OA, Scola, Ryder and a SWAT team invade the house, engaging in a gunfight against McNair and his men with all the suspects being shot dead. OA finds Jake and reveals to the JOC via a body camera a SWAT officer accompanying him that Jake is alive, the JOC erupting in cheers. At the hospital, Jake's feeling stupid for selling drugs as Isobel arrives to talk to Dan. With Jake and Lori off grabbing a snack, Isobel confronts Dan, dropping her politeness, revealing that she trusted him, she gave him the benefit of the doubt and that he still lied right to her face, revealing Jubal was right all along: Dan did steal the money. In his bed, Dan tells Isobel he was desperate, he needed money to help pay for life-saving surgery for Jake and he screwed up, acknowledging the family's paid a price for his mistakes. He begs Isobel to look the other way but Isobel heads for the door, waving. On her signal, Scola and Ryder arrive, Scola telling Dan he's under arrest as Ryder handcuffs him to his hospital bed before Isobel takes one final glance and promptly leaves.
36	14	"Studio Gangster"	Alex Chapple	Rick Eid	January 28, 2020	FBI214	9.26
The team investigate when US attorney Scott Conway is found dead steps away from the body of an unidentified African-American woman who's classified as a Jane Doe. Kristen later reveals that the young woman has been identified: 19 year old Maya Depriest whose father, Lawrence died in 2013 and whose mother, Christina Jubal arrested for drug possession, Jubal later personally informing Christina her daughter has been murdered. Jubal is disgusted and enraged when the media begin suspecting Conway and Depriest were lovers. With help from Mona, the team learn of Big Tracy, a rapper who joined the 718 gang for publicity but when Marcus King or Thumper puts a contract on Big Tracy's life, OA uses two of his friends to help stage a hit, forcing Big Tracy to turn on Maggie and OA for help. With Big Tracy working for them, the team discover heroin inside the home of Davina, Thumper's girlfriend with Davina being arrested. Via info from Ian Lim and Kelly Moran, Jubal realizes that Conway was murdered for being in the wrong place at the wrong time, having interverned after he saw Maya and Thumper fighting. Thumper is later arrested while Jubal gives Davina a fighting chance.
37	15	"Legacy"	Carl Seaton	Claire Demorest	February 11, 2020	FBI215	8.93
When a truck transferring guns and armor-piercing bullets is hijacked and later found with a body of a man in the back, the team investigate. OA soon learns that the crime has been tracked back to Sulaiman Mansor, the leader of a terrorist group OA thought he had helped elimimiate years ago during his time in the Army. OA reunites with Terry Brooks who confirms he didn't confirm Mansor was in the building and that the strike only killed Mansor's family, OA shocked and angry at Brooks as the mission saw him being promoted to join the FBI. Isobel, Jubal and OA along with members from other federal agencies and the military meet with John Van Leer, the FBI Deputy Director who tells the group the details of this investigation are to remain highly classified for national security reasons. DNA evidence in a container later reveals Mansor is alive and that he's in the US with members of his NIA organization, Mansor seeking revenge against members of the American military who ordered the air strike that cost his family their lives. This has OA realizing Mansor and his men are heading to West Point where a ceremony is being held and one of those attending is General Carson who signed off on the bombing. Arriving at the entrance to West Point, Maggie and OA discover Mansor and his team have already blown through the checkpoint, killing the two military police officers manning the gates, Maggie informing her colleagues of that and they need to take Mansor and his men down quickly and quietly as the bulletproof vests they're all wearing won't hold against the armor-piercing rounds the group have. Eventually, the team and Kristen arrest the men who are posing as music players while OA sees Mansor approaching General Carson disguised as a military officer and fatally shoots Mansor dead, ending the threat.
38	16	"Safe Room"	Carlos Bernard	Rick Eid & Joe Halpin	February 18, 2020	FBI217	9.22
The team investigate when Chloe Ford, the daughter of billionaire Nathan Ford is abducted and they find her in under three hours but things get complicated when her kidnapper, Mike Holton reveals the FBI work fast to save a rich kid but when a poor kid is abducted, they take their time. Helton has himself and Chloe in a safe room of the house of a real estate estate, releasing a single demand: to find his daughter, Stephanie Rice who was kidnapped weeks ago in 2 hours, 45 minutes or he'll murder Chloe. With Jubal on site, leading the hostage negotiations, the team discover that Stephanie still hasn't been found. Worse, she is revealed to be part of a sex trafficking ring with the team using the flight pattern of a pigeon to find the house. They raid the place, rescuing Stephanie who is in critical condition and is hospitalized. Having practiced on the other safe room, Scola and Ryder accompany the SWAT team in storming on the safe room on Jubal's orders. During the event, Helton is shot dead and Chloe rescued. Eventually, Stephanie's alive and wakes up but this causes Helton to immediately code with paramedics working on him as Jubal looks on with it never being revealed if Helton managed to survive or if he died from his wounds.
39	17	"Broken Promises"	Olivia Newman	Tamara Jaron	March 10, 2020	FBI216	8.30
During a climate rally, Nicole Mitchell, the owner of an art gallery is shot dead, prompting the FBI team to investigate. They originally suspect her ex-boyfriend, Todd Conroy but Conroy is later found innocent. The case becomes personal for OA when his girlfriend, Mona is targeted with Mona revealing this is connected to a case involving sixteen year old Alex Bryant who was sent to prison on trumped up charges. The team soon discover Alex's father, Roman is responsible, targeting and killing everyone he deems responsible for sending Alex to prison and ruining his son's future, Alex even revealing to Maggie and OA he was raped in prison. Maggie and OA later spot Roman who takes a hostage, having failed to kill Alex's friend, Benny Delgado. With Maggie talking to him, Roman surrenders and is arrested. During the case, Maggie is offered a new assignment that would take her away from the New York office, but she is hesitant to tell OA. When she eventually does, she reassures him she'll be back.
40	18	"American Dreams"	Terry Miller	David Amann	March 24, 2020	FBI218	10.67
When a school bus with 26 elementary students is hijacked, the FBI race against time to find them. With Maggie away on her undercover mission, Jess LaCroix of the FBI Fugitive Taskforce and his team join the New York field team. They learn the mastermind is white supremacist Tyler Kane and that he's holding the children at a closed amusement park. After finding the children, Jess receives a video call from his young daughter, Talia, informing him that the food bank where she volunteers is being raided by ICE agents with Tali being detained on suspicions of being an illegal immigrant due to her skin color, ending the episode in a cliffhanger. Note : This episode begins a crossover event that concludes on FBI: Most Wanted season 1 episode 9. Julian McMahon (Jess LaCroix), Kellan Lutz (Kenny Crosby), Roxy Sternberg (Sheryll Barnes) and Keisha-Castle Hughes (Hana Gibson) are credited as Special Guest Stars. In the UK and Republic of Ireland, Sky Witness has the two episodes merged into one, lasting for 100 minutes- 1 hour and 40 minutes.
41	19	"Emotional Rescue"	Monica Raymund	Rick Eid & Joe Halpin	March 31, 2020	FBI219	10.85
The team investigates the murder of a foreign graduate student and Indian national, Arman Patel, after a drug deal gone bad. With Maggie still undercover, Chicago PD Detective Hailey Upton (guest star Tracy Spiridakos) temporarily joins the team as a part of the FBI's interagency training program. Upton, partnered with O.A. discovers her own methods clash with the Bureau's by-the-book environment.: This episode picks up after the Chicago P.D. episode "Lines". It also marks the final appearance of both Ebonee Noel (Kristen Chazal) and Catherine Haena Kim (Emily Ryder) while marking the first and only appearance of Tracy Spiridakos (Hailey Upton) who is also credited as a Special Guest Star.

== Production ==
=== Development ===
On January 25, 2019, during the TCA press tour, FBI was renewed for a second season, which premiered on September 24, 2019. On May 7, 2019, following the renewal it was announced that Milena Govich joined as co-executive producer and director.

On March 12, 2020, Universal Television has suspended the production of the last three episodes of the second season following the COVID-19 pandemic.

=== Casting ===
During the first-season finale, it was indicated that Ward would be departing the series after the first season. On July 9, 2019, Alana de la Garza—who played Isobel Castille in a guest appearance in the first season—was promoted to the main cast for the second season; she also recurs on the spin-off series FBI: Most Wanted.

On August 6, 2019, John Boyd was cast as Special Agent Stuart Scola, Kristen's new partner in the field, in a recurring role with the option to be promoted to regular at a later date while Ebonée Noel departed at the end of the season. Boyd was promoted to regular on October 7, 2019.

== Ratings ==
Viewership and ratings per episode of FBI season 2
No.	Title	Air date	Rating/share (18–49)	Viewers (millions)	DVR (18–49)	DVR viewers (millions)	Total (18–49)	Total viewers (millions)
1	"Little Egypt"	September 24, 2019	0.9/5	8.83	0.7	3.85	1.6	12.69
2	"The Lives of Others"	October 1, 2019	1.0/5	9.46	0.6	3.40	1.6	12.86
3	"American Idol"	October 8, 2019	0.8/4	8.70	0.5	3.24	1.3	11.94
4	"An Imperfect Science"	October 15, 2019	0.9/4	8.75	0.5	3.18	1.4	11.93
5	"Crossroads"	October 22, 2019	0.8/4	8.87	0.5	3.04	1.3	11.90
6	"Outsider"	November 5, 2019	0.8/4	8.54	0.5	3.51	1.3	12.06
7	"Undisclosed"	November 12, 2019	0.7/4	8.87	0.5	3.57	1.2	12.45
8	"Codename: Ferdinand"	November 19, 2019	0.8/4	8.83	0.5	3.33	1.3	12.17
9	"Salvation"	November 26, 2019	0.9/5	8.81	0.6	3.50	1.5	12.32
10	"Ties That Bind"	December 17, 2019	0.8/4	8.47	0.6	3.68	1.4	12.15
11	"Fallout"	January 7, 2020	0.9/4	9.32	0.5	3.43	1.4	12.76
12	"Hard Decisions"	January 14, 2020	0.8/4	8.57	0.5	3.70	1.3	12.27
13	"Payback"	January 21, 2020	0.9/4	9.24	0.5	3.44	1.4	12.69
14	"Studio Gangster"	January 28, 2020	0.9/5	9.26	0.5	3.43	1.4	12.69
15	"Legacy"	February 11, 2020	0.8	8.93	0.5	3.38	1.3	12.32
16	"Safe Room"	February 18, 2020	0.9	9.22	0.5	3.42	1.4	12.65
17	"Broken Promises"	March 10, 2020	0.8	8.30	0.5	3.64	1.3	11.94
18	"American Dreams"	March 24, 2020	1.1	10.67	0.6	3.88	1.7	14.57
19	"Emotional Rescue"	March 31, 2020	1.2	10.85	0.5	3.22	1.7	14.08
