= FBI season 4 =

Season of American television series

FBI
- Season 4
- Starring: Missy Peregrym; Zeeko Zaki; Jeremy Sisto; Alana de la Garza; John Boyd; Katherine Renee Turner
- No. of episodes: 21

Release
- Original network: CBS
- Original release: September 20, 2021 – May 17, 2022

Season chronology
- ← Previous; Season 3 Next → Season 5

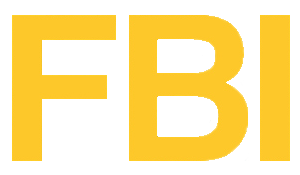
Text title for the series FBI on CBS

The fourth season of the American police procedural television series FBI premiered on September 21, 2021, on CBS, for the 2021–22 television season, and ended on May 17, 2022. The season premiered with a crossover event with FBI: Most Wanted and new spin-off series FBI: International.

FBI centers on inner workings of the New York office criminal division of the Federal Bureau of Investigation (FBI). The series features an ensemble cast including Missy Peregrym, Zeeko Zaki, Jeremy Sisto, Alana de la Garza, John Boyd and Katherine Renee Turner. The season consisted of 21 episodes.

== Cast and characters ==
=== Main ===
- Missy Peregrym as Maggie Bell, FBI Special Agent.
- Zeeko Zaki as Omar Adom "OA" Zidan, FBI Special Agent and Maggie's partner.
- Jeremy Sisto as Jubal Valentine, FBI Assistant Special Agent-in-Charge (ASAC), who runs the office's fusion center.
- Alana de la Garza as Isobel Castille, FBI Special Agent-in-Charge (SAC)
- John Boyd as Stuart Scola, FBI Special Agent and Tiffany's field partner.
- Katherine Renee Kane as Tiffany Wallace, FBI Special Agent and a former NYPD officer and White Collar Division agent.

=== Recurring ===
- James Chen as Ian Lim, an FBI Technical Analyst.
- Thomas Phillip O'Neil as Dr. Neil Mosbach, an FBI Medical Examiner.
- Taylor Anthony Miller as Kelly Moran, an FBI Analyst.
- Roshawn Franklin as Trevor Hobbs, an FBI Special Agent and an Intelligence Analyst.
- Vedette Lim as Elise Taylor, an FBI Intelligence Analyst.
- David Zayas as Antonio Vargas, the most notorious drug lord in the world and leader of the Durango Cartel.
- Kathleen Munroe as Rina Trenholm, FBI Assistant Director in Charge.
- Piter Marek as Rashid Bashir, FBI Special Agent in Charge of Counterterrorism.
- Shantel VanSanten as Nina Chase, an FBI Special Agent.

=== Crossover ===
- Julian McMahon as Jess LaCroix, FBI Supervisory Special Agent (SSA) and Team Leader of the Fugitive Task Force.
- Kellan Lutz as Kenny Crosby, FBI Special Agent in the Fugitive Task Force.

== Episodes ==
The number in the "No. overall" column refers to the episode's number within the overall series, whereas the number in the "No. in season" column refers to the episode's number within this particular season. "U.S. viewers (millions)" refers to the number of viewers in the U.S. in millions who watched the episode as it was aired.

No. overall	No. in season	Title	Directed by	Written by	Original release date	Prod. code	U.S. viewers (millions)
57	1	"All That Glitters"	Alex Chapple	Teleplay by : Rick Eid; Story by : Dick Wolf & Rick Eid	September 21, 2021	FBI401	7.12
In Budapest, Hungary, a man, Pierre Nagy is shot dead and a day later, in New York City, a yacht party is being held with Nicole Wyatt and another young woman along with various men attending, Nicole telling Julia about various men. However, the fun ends when Nicole receives a text message informing her of Nagy's murder. After saying goodbye to Julia, Nicole is also murdered by the same hitman who killed Nagy, prompting Maggie and OA to investigate where they soon discover that the girl accompanying Nicole, Julia Walcott is actually fifteen years old with her mother, Andrea completely unaware of her daughter's activities. The team also learn that Nicole was also the pimp of an underage sex trafficking ring, targeting rich men with Julia's best friend, Sophie telling Maggie and OA Julia began doing this because her mom, Andrea needs really expensive drugs because she's ill. To help with the case, Maggie calls in Kenny Crosby of the Fugitive Task Force after it's discovered that the man who killed both Nagy and Nicole is Curtis Williams, a former military veteran. Pursuing him, Crosby tries to talk to Williams, only to end up being shot and badly injured with Williams taking his jeep and fleeing, Maggie later clashing with Crosby's superior, SSA Jess LaCroix. Eventually, thanks to the efforts of Tiffany Wallace and Stuart Scola, Williams is taken into custody, revealing to Jess and Isobel Castille, the SSA of the FBI's New York Field Office that he also murdered a man in Hungary the previous day with further information revealing that the suspect they're looking for is Nathan Tate, a billionaire. When Julia briefly re-emerges, intending to flee, she is abducted in front of Maggie, OA and Andrea, resulting in OA putting out a BOLO for the Towncar she was seen being dragged into. With Jubal's help, they narrow the leads down to the Brooklyn Navy Yard where after a search with no body in the trunk of the car, OA finds Julia underneath some plastic sheets, injured, having been shot twice in the chest. In the ambulance, Julia confirms Tate hurt her and urges OA to find her friend, Sunny who's disappeared before she flatlines, dying seconds later, OA apologizing to her. Back at 26 Fed, Jubal grimly tells Isobel Julia has died, resulting in her dismay at the people who exploit, manipulate and murder, Jubal informing Isobel they got Tate as Julia used her dying moments to reveal that he hurt her. Isobel wants Tate arrested, Jubal agreeing. Regrouping outside the building, Maggie, OA, Scola and Tiffany prepare to arrest Tate, only to stop upon hearing a gunshot and watch as a body flies down from the high-rise building, crashing through a nearby bus stop with OA approaching the body, confirming it's Tate due to the gold watch on his wrist which leaves Maggie, Scola and Tiffany stunned while OA remains with Tate's dead body. Note: This episode begins a crossover event that continues on the season 3 premiere of FBI: Most Wanted and concludes on the pilot episode of FBI: International. while Julian McMahon (Jess LaCroix) and Kellan Lutz (Kenny Crosby) are credited as Special Guest Stars.
58	2	"Hacktivist"	Jean de Segonzac	Claire Demorest	September 28, 2021	FBI402	7.37
New York Children's Hospital is put on system lockdown after suffering from a cyberattack where Jubal's son, Tyler, is also being treated there. Through patient records, they narrow the suspect as hacker to be Lydia Ryan, who sent complaints following her roommate's death. She refuses to lift the hack despite Jubal bringing his son up.
59	3	"Trauma"	Alex Chapple	Joe Webb	October 5, 2021	FBI403	6.71
A bomb detonates at the Federal Courthouse, having been planted in the bag back belonging to an unsuspecting young boy. Surveillance cameras help the FBI in identifying the suspect as Ryan Davis, a veteran. Despite refusing to talk to them, further background checks lead the FBI to a veterans club, the Garrison Lounge, who has also been on the ATF's radar. Castille asks O. A. to ask his friend and fellow veteran Chris Zapata, to go into the club with a wire to get them an inside view of the club, only for things to go awry.
60	4	"Know Thyself"	Tim Busfield	Teleplay by : Joe Halpin; Story by : Jen Frosch	October 12, 2021	FBI404	6.75
The murder and subsequent discovery of Rob Holden, leads the FBI to track down a serial killer who prays on young homeless black men with a spree lasting the last two weeks. Scola discovers that Tiffany's cousin Terrence was at the club where Holden was before being killed, setting the suspicion on him. Tiffany is told to stay off the case due to a conflict of interest. Off the record, Tiffany learns that Terrence suspects he is gay, which was why he went to the club.
61	5	"Charlotte's Web"	Yangzom Brauen	Claire Demorest & Heather Michaels	November 2, 2021	FBI406	6.99
Charlotte Kincade is kidnapped from her suburban home while her husband, Alex, is away in Newport, New York. The team quickly discover that Alex was not being honest about his Newport trip being business related, and that he met up with another woman with whom he had an affair. Looking through Charlotte's last movements, they discover she was chased away from an ATM by Grant King, who reveals the “chase” was a mere fantasy experience, and Charlotte was played by another woman. The New York Office also discovers that Charlotte was a member of the same sex club as King, which her husband was not aware of. Meanwhile, OA's girlfriend Mona suggests he change careers.
62	6	"Allegiance"	John Polson	Keith Eisner	November 9, 2021	FBI405	7.17
NYPD detective James Gerrard from the 27th Precinct is shot and killed outside a bar. Soon after, a fellow detective, Aaron Dane, from the same precinct is shot, but survives. The FBI take in career criminal Rafael Alvarez, who explains that he gave a warning to Gerrard and Dane about money they stole from a raid, that belongs to a crime family. They learn that another detective, Pat Rudinsky, was sent to prison after having been forced to take $10,000 of said money, having also told the truth to his son, Ray. During the case, Tiffany finds that her past with the NYPD may be compromising her views. Note: This episode refers the 27th Police Precinct, which is the location of Law & Order.
63	7	"Gone Baby Gone"	Eif Rivera	Zach Calig	November 16, 2021	FBI407	7.61
Lucia Diaz is abducted from her daycare centre, while on the surface her parents seem to have a clean record. However, her mother, Jenny, later steals jewelry from a former nanny employer in order to help her husband, Hugo, pay of a debt he owes to the Queensbridge local Latin Kings leader, Ricky Moreno. Wallace and Scola find Hugo in a park, high on drugs prior to his meeting with Moreno. He cooperates with the FBI and wears a wire while meeting Moreno. During the stakeout, Maggie gets distracted when she learns that her sister, Erin, has overdosed, resulting in a narrow escape for Moreno, who shoots Hugo and a police officer in the process.
64	8	"Fire and Rain"	Sharat Raju	Rick Eid	December 7, 2021	FBI408	7.03
Elliot Young, a former veteran and bomb technician, is shot in his home and crawled outside before dying. The FBI and NYPD discover a hidden lab in his basement, used for making bombs. A stolen car leads them to Hannah Thompson, whose boyfriend, Alberto, is revealed to be a part of a Venezuelan socialist revolutionary movement. Meanwhile, Wallace encourages Scola to move forward from thoughts of his brother having died on 9/11, and he finally decides to meet his brother's wife again.
65	9	"Unfinished Business"	Alex Chapple	Teleplay by : Joe Halpin; Story by : Joe Halpin & J.F. Halpin	December 14, 2021	FBI409	8.31
Trenholm is shot when she and Jubal are about to head to work, being in a critical condition. Through her surveillance footage, Jubal and the team discover that someone followed her to work one day, a man named Castlewood, who reveals to be working for a dangerous higher up that both he and another associate won't cross.
66	10	"Fostered"	Stephen Surjik	Joe Webb & York Walker	January 4, 2022	FBI410	8.52
Armed robbers rob a jewelry store, killing the shop owner and a woman in their escape. The FBI manage to find several stolen fake watches in a box in a pawn shop, where the shop owner was killed. Nearby traffic cameras point to 16 year old Jamal Carter who was the last person to carry the box. The FBI's suspicions turn to his three older brothers, and with permission from child services, have him wear a wire to his house. The connection is lost for a brief second, but Bell and Wallace have a hard time getting Jamal to tell them the truth of what happened. Meanwhile, Scola reveals to Bell that Wallace was the officer who shot Jamal's biological father on Christmas Eve seven years ago, something she feels guilty about.
67	11	"Grief"	Matthew McLoota	Keith Eisner	January 11, 2022	FBI411	8.45
Trenholm passes away, and Jubal returns her belongings to her mother, Nicole. The FBI investigates the recent abduction of 19 year old Angela Mullins, and tracks the car she was dumped in to Long Island, where another victim escapes but is hit by a truck. The victim is identified as Cassidy Drabeck, who had been reported missing by her father four months prior. Further evidence establishes a club owner, Beth Paige, as an accomplice to kidnapper, Doyle Buckler, who Paige tries to protect. Buckler's motive is retaliation against his first date, Darcy Edmonds, by kidnapping girls who share a similar appearance to her. During the case, Jubal takes a personal interest in securing justice for Cassidy's father, but Mr. Drabeck is outraged that Buckler has to wait a year before trial.
68	12	"Under Pressure"	Brenna Malloy	Claire Demorest	February 1, 2022	FBI412	7.54
Maggie goes undercover at a bar after its owner, Colin McConnell, suspects some of its customers, schemes about utilising bombs in attacks that previously killed an NYPD inspector. The councilman for the district, Doug Archer, is killed in another bombing at his office. Jubal and the rest of the team track the delivery man, Brian Markham, who reveals another man gave him the package in exchange for 100$ dollars. The man is identified as one of the extremists, Eric Park. During the case, McConnell gets into a dispute with Maggie about continuing his undercover role.
69	13	"Pride and Prejudice"	Alex Chapple	Teleplay by : Kristy Lowrey; Story by : Joe Halpin	February 22, 2022	FBI413	7.38
Pakistani student Kosey Khan and his brother Amir are assaulted by masked men in their apartment, leaving the former dead and the latter with serious injuries. The FBI suspect James Tinker, a janitor who had continuously harassed the Khans, suspecting Kosey of stealing. This proves true as he had stolen parts to make plastic guns to someone. During the case, OA works with special agent in charge for counter terrorism, Rashid Bashar, to talk to his local imam, Mustafa, about the suspects having visited his mosque. Bashar pushes the limits, leading to Mustafa filing a complaint.
70	14	"Ambition"	Jean de Segonzac	Keith Eisner	March 8, 2022	FBI414	7.71
A bomb detonates in the building of Jamie's Foundation led by anti-gun activist Ann Tasker whose daughter, Jamie was killed ten years ago. The FBI discover that Gotham Freedom Front had encouraged attacks against Tasker, although its leader Paul Bogsen does not condone violence. He does however point them to David Moder, someone he labels a loose cannon. After Moder escapes during a protest, he's tackled by two NYPD officers who continues to beat him. Wallace reports the incident to NYPD Internal Affairs, but Bashar asks OA to water it down in the case he were to get a promotion, leaving OA caught in the middle.
71	15	"Scar Tissue"	Lisa Robinson	Heather Michaels	March 22, 2022	FBI415	8.03
Twenty nine year old Violet Kent frantically attempts to enter a bar, and asks the woman on duty to call the police. A mysterious man breaks in and kidnaps Kent. The FBI investigates identify a man who was aggressive to Kent at a bar the night before, Bobby Gannon, but he has an alibi. Kent is later found dead and further evidence shows a string of four victims in several cities across the country, with Kent being the first in New York. Meanwhile, Castillo's father asks her out for dinner and that they reconcile their relationship, which she accepts.
72	16	"Protective Details"	Alex Zakrzewski	Joe Webb	March 29, 2022	FBI416	7.58
Right before the start of a charity event hockey game, a sniper opens fire, killing ICE agent Mike Mulder while also injuring other people present, with congressman Curtis Grange and his son Ethan also in attendance. The team identifies a suspect, Bradley Baker, who has a Facebook Wall full of messages and posts about abolishing ICE. The investigation leads to another suspect Oscar Rodriguez, who was romantically involved with Baker and whose parents were deported and later murdered by the local MS-13. Meanwhile, OA offers Ethan Grange an application to join the FBI when he's of age, and reassures him that he will help him with the process when he's ready.
73	17	"One Night Stand"	Alex Chapple	Rick Eid & Joe Halpin	April 12, 2022	FBI417	7.39
John Kraus and Julia Miller are killed by a masked assailant at the General Grant National Memorial. The FBI discover that they had returned from a trip to Cancún, which not even Miller's mother knew of. Medical examination reveals that she had smuggled cocaine in her body, and the driver who drove her and Kraus is identified as Benny Gomez. Scola and Tiffany learn that he was working with Nina Chase, an undercover agent and a former date of Scola. The team learn that Gomez was her informant in order to take down the Mexican Regents headed by Hector Garcia, known as El Perro. Meanwhile, Scola sets out to ask Nina to dinner, hoping to mend their relationship, which she eventually accepts.: This episode marks the debut appearance of Shantel VanSanten (Nina Chase).
74	18	"Fear Nothing"	Jon Cassar	Rick Eid & Joe Halpin	April 19, 2022	FBI418	7.51
After the murder of Tom Hamilton, a federal reserve security guard, the investigation leads the team to two unknown men who are in possession of sarin gas, an extremely toxic compound. The team identifies a suspect as Nassar Ali, a known terrorist in Syria, and attempt to apprehend him, but are forced to kill him when he resists arrest. OA and Maggie go to an abandoned building belonging to Gen Research where the other suspect, Hakeen Abbas, and the sarin gas are located. In the process, a canister with the gas falls on the ground, exposing the room, closing the doors automatically. OA, with the guidance of a doctor at 26 Fed, manage to get Maggie out, but her severe injuries land her in the hospital for an uncertain period of time.
75	19	"Face Off"	Jackeline Tejada	Claire Demorest & York Walker	April 26, 2022	FBI419	7.56
With Maggie in the hospital, the FBI's New York office investigates the murder of Maria Blake, who, with her wife Olivia, was attacked by an assailant who broke into their home. Olivia survives and is hospitalized while her daughter Brooke is taken care of by child services. Nina Chase steps in as Maggie's substitute, and Castille is given a BAU supervisory agent to tag along. The team realises that they're dealing with a serial killer targeting women in high-ranking positions. Having obtained the Blakes' surveillance footage, Castille decides to give the public the fragment of the killer's face, revealing he's black. Castille is revealed as his next target, and she manages to fend him off and reveals that he wears a silicon mask, and that he had white skin color and not black. Castille is afraid of the fallout of putting an accurate description of the suspect's appearance to the public.
76	20	"Ghost from the Past"	Heather Cappiello	Rick Eid & Joe Halpin	May 10, 2022	FBI420	7.16
TSA agent Cher Wilkins is murdered in an industrial area, with her supervisor having raised suspicions about her. The team apprehends Jorge Cissneros, who smuggled drugs through the airport to Chicago. While watching Cissneros, OA sees someone who resembles a known terrorist he once hunted in Afghanistan, long believed to be dead. Chase and other team members remain sceptical about said terrorist, Tamir Hazara, being alive.
77	21	"Kayla"	Alex Zakrzewski	Keith Eisner & Joe Webb	May 17, 2022	FBI421	7.15
Retired DEA agent Thomas Webber is gunned down right outside a local bakery. The FBI learns that he went on to work as a security guard at a nightclub. Following the murder of Wallie Lamox, a church janitor, they learn that both he and Webber were considered witnesses against heroin gang LS-19, led by Callum Brewster. Tiffany asks Castille that they use one of Brewster's restaurant waitresses, Kayla Marsh, to get Brewster's phone, something she and Chase disagree on how to approach.
78	22	"Prodigal Son" (Note: This episode was pulled from its planned airing on May 24, 2022 on CBS due to the Uvalde school shooting that occurred the same day that the episode was scheduled to air. It was, however, aired on other networks as Season 4 Episode 22.)	Alex Chapple	Rick Eid	May 24, 2022	FBI422	6.97
Two masked assailants rob a gun store and kill the owner in the process. The FBI manages to identify one of them through surveillance cameras, Clayton Hall, who has a history of odd behavior and resorting to violence. When they arrive at his house, he commits suicide after refusing to leave his room. The case becomes personal for Jubal when it's discovered that his son, Tyler, plays video games with a friend group which the second assailant might be a part of. The case becomes more complicated when Jubal learns that Tyler was on speaking terms with the second assailant who may be targeting a girl at his school.

== Production ==
On March 24, 2021, CBS renewed FBI for a fourth season. On April 20, 2022, it was announced that Shantel VanSanten would return as Special Agent Nina Chase in a recurring role while Peregrym was on maternity leave.

=== Delayed episode ===
The season finale, "Prodigal Son," was delayed from its original broadcast date May 24, 2022 due to the Robb Elementary School shooting that occurred the same day that the episode was scheduled to be broadcast. While the episode aired in the middle of Season 5 on October 4, 2022, the show's production code designated it as Season 4, not Season 5.

In the UK and Republic of Ireland, Sky Witness which airs FBI has "Prodigal Son" as a part of FBI Season 5.

== Release ==
The fourth season premiered on September 21, 2021. It aired on Tuesdays at 8:00 p.m. with its spin-off series FBI: Most Wanted and FBI: International.

== Ratings ==
Viewership and ratings per episode of FBI season 4
No.	Title	Air date	Rating (18–49)	Viewers (millions)	DVR (18–49)	DVR viewers (millions)	Total (18–49)	Total viewers (millions)
1	"All That Glitters"	September 21, 2021	0.7	7.12	—N/a	—N/a	—N/a	—N/a
2	"Hacktivist"	September 28, 2021	0.7	7.37	—N/a	—N/a	—N/a	—N/a
3	"Trauma"	October 5, 2021	0.6	6.71	—N/a	—N/a	—N/a	—N/a
4	"Know Thyself"	October 12, 2021	0.7	6.75	0.3	2.85	1.0	9.49
5	"Charlotte's Web"	November 2, 2021	0.6	6.99	—N/a	—N/a	—N/a	—N/a
6	"Allegiance"	November 9, 2021	0.7	7.17	—N/a	—N/a	—N/a	—N/a
7	"Gone Baby Gone"	November 16, 2021	0.7	7.61	0.3	2.64	1.0	10.25
8	"Fire and Rain"	December 7, 2021	0.6	7.02	0.3	2.68	0.9	9.70
9	"Unfinished Business"	December 14, 2021	0.8	8.31	—N/a	—N/a	—N/a	—N/a
10	"Fostered"	January 4, 2022	0.8	8.52	—N/a	—N/a	—N/a	—N/a
11	"Grief"	January 11, 2022	0.8	8.45	—N/a	—N/a	—N/a	—N/a
12	"Under Pressure"	February 1, 2022	0.6	7.54	—N/a	—N/a	—N/a	—N/a
13	"Pride and Prejudice"	February 22, 2022	0.6	7.38	—N/a	—N/a	—N/a	—N/a
14	"Ambition"	March 8, 2022	0.7	7.71	—N/a	—N/a	—N/a	—N/a
15	"Scar Tissue"	March 22, 2022	0.7	8.03	—N/a	—N/a	—N/a	—N/a
16	"Protective Details"	March 29, 2022	0.7	7.58	—N/a	—N/a	—N/a	—N/a
17	"One Night Stand"	April 12, 2022	0.6	7.39	—N/a	—N/a	—N/a	—N/a
18	"Fear Nothing"	April 19, 2022	0.6	7.51	—N/a	—N/a	—N/a	—N/a
19	"Face Off"	April 26, 2022	0.6	7.56	—N/a	—N/a	—N/a	—N/a
20	"Ghost from the Past"	May 10, 2022	0.6	7.16	—N/a	—N/a	—N/a	—N/a
21	"Kayla"	May 17, 2022	0.6	7.15	—N/a	—N/a	—N/a	—N/a
