= FBI season 7 =

Season of American television series

FBI
- Season 7
- Starring: Missy Peregrym; Zeeko Zaki; John Boyd; Lisette Olivera; Alana de la Garza; Jeremy Sisto
- No. of episodes: 22

Release
- Original network: CBS
- Original release: October 15, 2024 – May 20, 2025

Season chronology
- ← Previous; Season 6 Next → Season 8

The seventh season of the American police procedural television drama series FBI premiered for the 2024–25 television season, on October 15, 2024, on CBS, and concluded on May 20, 2025, with 22 episodes produced.

The series centers on inner workings of the New York City field office criminal division of the Federal Bureau of Investigation (FBI), bringing to bear all their talents, intellect, and technical expertise on major cases in order to keep New York and the country safe.

== Cast and characters ==
=== Main ===
- Missy Peregrym as Maggie Bell, FBI Senior Special Agent.
- Zeeko Zaki as Omar Adom "OA" Zidan, FBI Special Agent and Maggie's partner.
- John Boyd as Stuart Scola, FBI Senior Special Agent.
- Lisette Olivera as Special Agent Sydney Ortiz, FBI Special Agent and Scola’s temporary partner (Episodes 4–8)
- Alana de la Garza as Isobel Castille, FBI Special Agent in Charge (SAC).
- Jeremy Sisto as Jubal Valentine, FBI Assistant Special Agent In Charge (ASAC).

=== Recurring ===
- Thomas Phillip O'Neil as Dr. Neil Mosbach, an FBI Medical Examiner
- Carmen Lamar Gonzalez as Carla Flores, an FBI bomb disposal expert
- James Chen as Analyst Ian Lim
- Taylor Anthony Miller as Analyst Kelly Moran
- Vedette Lim as Analyst Elise Taylor
- Mara Davi as Samantha Kelton, Jubal Valentine's ex-wife
- Emily Alabi as Dani Rhodes, FBI Special Agent. (Episodes 16–22)
- Ben Shenkman as John Reynolds, FBI Assistant Director in Charge (ADIC) of New York Field Office.

=== Guests ===
- Katherine Renee Kane as Tiffany Wallace, FBI Special Agent and Scola's former partner
- Campbell Scott as Simon Keane, FBI Deputy Assistant Director (DAD). (S7 E22)
- James Tupper as Philip, a father of a victim's partner

=== Crossover characters ===
- Shantel VanSanten as Special Agent Nina Chase (FBI: Most Wanted)

== Episodes ==
No. overall	No. in season	Title	Directed by	Written by	Original release date	Prod. code	U.S. viewers (millions)
114	1	"Abandoned"	Alex Chapple	Mike Weiss	October 15, 2024	FBI701	5.89
Brooklyn plumber Tariq Amini is killed in a car bombing on the Henry Hudson Parkway, and shortly after learning of an argument with a friend, Scola and Wallace bear witness to the friend also being killed by the same assassins. The team suspects that everything isn't as it seems and further get their suspicions confirmed when they find an Iranian weapons provider in a secret room in a bookstore, who refuses to tell them anything. Soon the CIA gets involved, revealing that Amini and his wife were recruited in 2005 to take out a secret police general in exchange for US citizenship, but were abandoned during the process. Despite securing Amini's wife and daughter, the assassins quickly find them, but Maggie and OA fend them off. The US Marshals later assists them in securing the wife and daughter and Maggie and OA deny any involvement to the CIA despite their suspicions. Scola is injured during a fight with one assassin, while Wallace packs her things to move to Georgia, seeking peace following the Siran case.: This episode marks the final appearance of Katherine Renee Kane (Tiffany Wallace) and she is also credited as Special Guest Star.
115	2	"Trusted"	Milena Govich	Aaron Ginsburg	October 22, 2024	FBI702	5.88
Following the death of the wealthy Fleming family, the FBI find themselves pursuing recently escaped convict Paul Gordon alongside fellow inmate John Pereira. After they discover Pereira's ex-wife tortured and killed, they also find him attempting to escape the scene. Pereira claims that Gordon killed her and the Flemings and kidnapped his daughter Naomy. He reveals that Gordon wanted money he had stashed, but this was to cover his real intention of wanting to see his daughter again. Meanwhile, OA is reunited with an old army friend, Clay Voss, who he eventually learns has other motives with his return to New York and asks OA to help him install a bug for an operation against a customer of his.
116	3	"Détente"	Laura Belsey	Ryan Maldonado & Eduardo Javier Canto	October 29, 2024	FBI703	5.61
When a bomb detonates at a bodega, the team suspects it to be the start of a gang war, which only intensifies when a second bomb explodes sometime later. A third goes off when Maggie and OA question an informant about the bombings, while CCTV footage identify the suspect as an external actor. When Clay Voss's private security company is brought into the equation, OA asks him to reveal who gave the orders through the company's app.
117	4	"Doubted"	Alex Chapple	Bryce Ahart & Stephanie McFarlane	November 12, 2024	FBI704	6.31
After her sister is drugged by a masked assailant, Behavioural Analysis Unit agent Syd Ortiz goes to Castille personally with the case when the NYPD refuses to open an investigation. As the team open the case, they soon learn that they're up against a stalker who abducts and sexually assaults his victims before driving them home and there are more than seventeen victims spanning years back. Despite her rocky introduction to the team when handling the case, Castille decides to take Ortiz on.
118	5	"Pledges"	Jon Cassar	Sabir Pirzada	November 19, 2024	FBI705	6.55
A protest at Hudson University turns into a crime scene when the body of student Jacob Aquino is found in an auditorium. The team turns their sight against his fraternity, whose leader, Freddy Albrect, is revealed to be involved in smuggling cocaine for the Becerra brothers. He claims that they killed Jacob in retaliation for a batch not being delivered on time and agrees to work undercover to deliver the batch back to them. Their investigation overlaps with another drug operation by the NYPD into the Becerra brothers, who they reluctantly work with to rescue Freddy's friend Allister who was abducted as collateral. During the roundup of protestors, Jubal asks the NYPD to release Tyler to avoid a criminal record for his FBI ambitions. Consequently, Castille has him suspended for abuse of power and the OPR opens an investigation into his conduct.
119	6	"Perfect"	Cory Bowles	Mae Smith	December 3, 2024	FBI706	6.66
Maggie finds herself confronting serial killer Ray Distefano, who she put away twelve years prior, when a string of new female victims matching his killing pattern appears. Despite evidence that he has been stalking her since he was released, Maggie concedes that he hasn't restarted. Meanwhile, Maggie contemplates whether she should keep Ella, and after learning about Distefano's stalking, decided that Ella is perhaps best off staying with her uncle and his family instead.
120	7	"Monumental"	Eriq La Salle	Matthew S. Partney	December 10, 2024	FBI707	6.58
With Jubal back from suspension, the team investigate the death of park ranger Desiree Cole at Governors Island by a masked gunman. The mask is identified to be merchandise sold by influencer Duke Ducoyle on the behalf of a conspiracy theorist dubbed Calvin. The online community behind him supports his claims that the Governors Island National Monument and its Inn serve as a front for a pedophile ring. With nothing suggesting Calvin as a separate person from Ducoyle, the team try to get his supporters to reveal that he was the mastermind all along.
121	8	"Riptide"	Jean de Segonzac	Woody Straussner	December 17, 2024	FBI708	6.68
Three customs officers are shot and killed in a cargo heist at JFK Airport in what the team soon suspects was an inside job of a hedge fund who had ordered gold from Switzerland. The robbery crew is led by a Haitian internationally wanted criminal, but the crew and the insider, revealed to be the CEO, are found dead at the crew's safe house. After spotting Clay Voss leaving the scene, OA learns that Pyramid Security were tasked to investigate the insider trading and Castille approves Clay to serve as their undercover agent in extracting intel about a group of corrupt Suffolk County police detectives who lost their pensions to that hedge fund over a failed investment. During the case, OA suspects Clay is in danger when his phone is tossed out of the detectives' vehicle, but later learns that Clay wants to take the gold for himself. He is forced to shoot him after he resists.
122	9	"Descent"	Carlos Bernard	Aaron Ginsburg	January 28, 2025	FBI710	6.22
The death of a former assistant attorney Alan Champion leads the New York Field Office to his client who worked with a digital back door to Canto Airlines' fleet, which in turn they learn are targeted by a Bolivian terrorist group seeking to target critical infrastructure around the country. Their efforts to secure the control box proves challenging after they free a hostage, who is revealed to be an undercover operative for the group. They manage to triangulate the leader's location and search a blacked-out Manhattan for him and have the airline's technical supervisor undo the damage and reinstate control to all the airline's planes. With his partner, Sydney Ortiz having been transferred to D.C. to join a special task force, Scola who's been left without a partner once again finally decides to open the letter from the mayor’s office with Nina, which reveals that Douglas' remains have finally been identified.
123	10	"Redoubt"	Alex Chapple	Mike Weiss	February 4, 2025	FBI709	5.98
Jubal's long-term CI Faheem Ellahie misses a scheduled meeting before reappearing and giving a sketchy account of his recent whereabouts and giving the team a flash drive which contains false intel of an impending drug shipment, which instead infects one of their highly secure computers. They learn that Faheem was kidnapped by the terrorist group ForeFront and forced to do their bidding in an attempt to free his brother Daanish and cripple the FBI. The team join the US Marshals in escorting Daanish to his transfer prison, but the convoy is ambushed by ForeFront. They manage to secure him despite this, but Jubal is forced to shoot a Marshal who secretly worked for the group. Due to his actions, Faheem is given a new handler and Jubal gets back together with Samantha, who comes to realize how much has changed.
124	11	"Shelter"	Jon Cassar	Ryan Maldonado & Eduardo Javier Canto	February 11, 2025	FBI712	6.05
When a group of people are killed in a shooting at a homeless shelter, the FBI first suspects it was the result of a hate crime but soon learn that the entire situation arose as part of kidnapping of the ex-girlfriend of a Mexican drug cartel boss who has a bounty on her head. Further details reveals that she had fled Mexico to give her son a better life, but this proves more complicated when the DEA intervenes, revealing that the cartel boss is providing them with information on the cartel's stash around the country. When the son is kidnapped, the FBI attempt to talk his kidnapper into letting the boy go but are forced to breach his hideout when he refuses. The team are forced to break their promise to the ex-girlfriend in returning the son to his father as part of the deal made with the DEA. OA takes the case personally due to it occurring in his neighborhood and later decides to contribute in helping the shelter by donating food.
125	12	"Manhunt"	Nelson McCormick	Bryce Ahart & Stephanie McFarlane	February 18, 2025	FBI711	6.55
A sting operation into the Ocampos sex trafficking ring goes awry and the FBI find themselves looking for a girl, Analis, who is on the run. With the help of dispatcher Joel, the team manage to follow her whereabouts until Adan Ocampos catches up with her and seemingly kills her. The team arrest his brother and convince him to turn on Adan, revealing the location of Analis's sister and other girls in addition to Adan, who is killed when resisting. They are surprised to learn that Analis is alive after all and find her in a scrapyard close to death, but Maggie manages to revive her. Despite their best efforts, Analis's sister is killed before she can be saved, causing Maggie to feel guilty about initially not saving the sisters. She decides to stay to oversee Analis' recovery in hospital alongside Joel.
126	13	"Unearth"	Jean de Segonzac	Woody Straussner	February 25, 2025	FBI714	6.28
Two jurors are killed against the backdrop of the trial against the Sicilian mafia, which the FBI first suspects was a hit. However, things take a turn when the US Marshal who guarded the jurors is killed in his home, which they link to his past as a drill instructor at the Cornwall Military Academy. They learn from an earlier 911 caller that he and others at the academy were sexually abused by the Marshal and two other staff members. When another staff member is killed, the team rush to find the killer at an academy fundraiser and thwart his last kill. Scola is surprised to learn that his former instructor is the last target but goes out of his way to protect him from the killer until OA can apprehend him. Upon reflection, Scola also deduces that his friend David Murray was also sexually abused during their time at the academy, shedding clarity to the circumstances of his suicide.
127	14	"Hitched"	Alex Chapple	Mae Smith	March 11, 2025	FBI713	6.43
The murder of a train driver leads the team to the hijacking of a Voyager passenger train bound for Niagara Falls with 200 passengers, including OA and his girlfriend Gemma. As several other railway employees are found murdered, the team determines that all were taken out by a group of grieving family members who lost their loved ones in a train disaster resulting in a chemical leak in West Liberty, Ohio. OA and other passengers attempt to stop the hijackers, but are quickly stopped and Gemma is injured in the process. When the lead hijacker turns against her accomplices, she reveals that she is using the train as a guided missile towards the CTX Industries HQ to cause an even bigger catastrophe. OA evacuates the passengers to the rear of the train and detaches them from the locomotive and tries to talk the leader down, but she commits suicide. With little time left, he improvises so he can get into the driver cab and finally stop the train before reaching the CTX HQ.
128	15	"Acolyte"	Loren Yaconelli	Bryce Ahart & Stephanie McFarlane	March 18, 2025	FBI715	6.19
When two women are killed in a similar manner with slashes over their bodies, the FBI team deduces that they are dealing with a copycat killer admiring the works of convicted serial slasher Ray DiStefano, who Maggie put in prison seventeen years ago. She goes to him for help which he reluctantly offers after she promises him that he will meet his ailing father. They identify the copycat killer as taxi driver Daryl Lee Rickland, who has kidnapped his most recent victim and threatens to kill her and disappear. The FBI tracks him to Staten Island and chase him through old catacombs before Maggie fights him and he is shot by Scola. DiStefano pledges revenge against Maggie after learning that she knew his father had died. Maggie and Joel start seeing each other, but she is hesitant to open up to him at first, before starting to accept the idea.
129	16	"Covered"	Alex Chapple	Sabir Pirzada	April 1, 2025	FBI716	6.01
Following the death of an undercover agent, the FBI discover that the identities of eight other undercover agents have been compromised and leaked by an internal source, to the Irish mafia and sold by a middleman. They identify the leak to have come from an independent analyst with the Undercover unit gone rogue, who comes under questions from them about the leak. Most of the compromised agents are pulled from the field, but Maggie is not among them, as she is working undercover infiltrating the ecoterrorist organization PLF when her identity is compromised, with the terrorists leaving her for dead, but she is saved by OA. Together with undercover agent Dani Rhodes, they rush to prevent the PLF from blowing up their newest target in the nick of time. For her efforts assisting the team, Castille offers Rhodes a position with them, which she happily accepts.
130	17	"Lineage"	Milena Govich	Woody Strassner & Mae Smith & Sabir Pirzada	April 8, 2025	FBI718	6.01
Rapper Turncoat and two of his fans are murdered, which the FBI first suspect was part of an ongoing feud between Turncoat and fellow rapper Tariq Ward, but upon the discovery of pink cocaine in his tour bus, learn that the murders were part of a newly started gang war between the Solanos and the previously defunct Grippo gang. They learn that the Grippo patriarch, Jack Grippo, has returned from his exile in Cuba to expand the gang's territory through an alliance with the Solanos. They are assisted by Grippo's daughter Billie, who kills her brother in self-defence during a sting operation. After they find and are forced to kill Jack Grippo, Scola learns that Billie gave them the wrong location and that she had secretly planned to take over the gang herself. Castille celebrates her 20th anniversary with the FBI and contemplates retiring, but ultimately decides that she isn't finished yet.
131	18	"Blkpill"	Jon Cassar	Ryan Maldonado & Eduardo Javier Canto	April 15, 2025	FBI717	5.77
After two women are murdered, the FBI find themselves investigating extreme members of the incelosphere who target women who rejected them on dates. They manage to rescue a third woman from a similar fate and discover that the members worked with an insider on the dating website who provided them with a list of women who rejected them. They also learn that they catfished the women by posing as the former boss to one of them. The team rush to Hudson University to stop the last member from killing the CEO of the dating website during a live broadcast, catching himself on fire in the process. Maggie contemplates Joel's understanding of her job and vice versa, and they decide in the end to try and understand each other as they go.
132	19	"Partner"	Eriq La Salle	Matthew S. Partney	April 22, 2025	FBI719	5.96
An eight-year-old girl is kidnapped as a part of a plot by mercenaries to steal C4 explosives from her father's workplace intended to be used for a larger plot against a target in the city. The team track down the mercenaries, but Maggie and OA are exposed to biohazard material when they find one of them in a container. The FBI learn that the bomb also includes anthrax aimed at targeting the entirety of Lower Manhattan, which also puts the field office in the danger zone, forcing Castille to evacuate all staff except Elise who decides to stay behind. After capturing the bomber and Castille convincing him to give up the bomb's location, Maggie and OA race to secure the bomb out of harms way in a bank vault. OA removes the anthrax before it detonates, only causing minimal damage to the nearby surroundings.
133	20	"Startup"	Peter Stebbings	Aaron Ginsburg	May 6, 2025	FBI720	5.64
CEO Peter Minkoff and his wife were killed in an explosion in his highly secure penthouse apartment, which the FBI soon learns was bombed by a drone, which also kills another CEO. Both sat on the board of AI startup Cyclone, which the team secures at 26 Fed fearing they'll be the next target. A video of their technology officers deduces that the CEO Scott Collins was behind the attacks and he flees to send off the last drone which he intends to target board member Warren Foster's daughter Ashley. Maggie and OA secure Ashley, but unable to escape the drone, flee inside a parking garage just as the bomb drops. Maggie is temporarily incapacitated before being revived again. Collins intended to sway his board about AI safety concerns, but their vote goes against his wishes. Maggie breaks up with Joel, thinking she might be better off alone, but quickly learns that her colleagues' friendships still has meaning despite this change.
134	21	"Devoted"	Carlos Bernard	Suhana Chander & Aaron Ginsberg	May 13, 2025	FBI721	5.73
The team investigate when two IRS agents are stabbed to death in Brooklyn with the resulting investigation leading them back to the online conspiracy community of Duke Ducoyle which has resurged, but also learn that his wife has been kidnapped. Additionally they learn that someone else has taken over as Calvin and is ordering followers around. Ducoyle's wife is rescued and Calvin is identified as Rob Whitfield, whose brother was arrested after the monument storming. Whitfield tasks the followers to kill the prosecutors of the trial against the 41 followers arrested for the monument storming, but when this fails, he resorts to breaking his brother from prison and stages a mass protest outside the prison as a distraction. Maggie and OA apprehend him just as his brother dies from his stab wounds. Ducoyle gets a further charge after the Calvin account messages reveals that he ordered followers to harass Castille.
135	22	"A New Day"	Alex Chapple	Mitch Kampf & Mike Weiss	May 20, 2025	FBI722	6.17
When Jubal survives an attack on a secret FBI office, the team along with Ian Lim, Kelly Moran, and Elise Taylor work to uncover what happened, discovering that ForeFront has returned and has infiltrated the FBI. They have also planted bombs in FBI-issued phones delivered in the last month, which triggers multiple explosions around 26 Fed, which kills eight agents and ADAC John Reynolds and severely injures Castille. Reynolds' deputy Simon Keene becomes acting ADAC and orders the office on temporary leave until ForeFront has been stopped. Castille, having faked her death, continues to work with the team off radar and they lure Keene's SWAT team to their hideout, taking them out and learning from his right-hand man that he is working in the interests of the Chinese government and also ForeFront. Castille collapses while debriefing the office on their work.

== Production ==
=== Development ===
On April 9, 2024, CBS renewed FBI for seasons seven through nine. On May 17, 2024, it was announced that cast members of all three FBI series would get their appearances that are reduced in order to lower production costs.

=== Casting ===
On August 19, 2024, Lisette Olivera joined the cast as a new series regular for the seventh season while Katherine Renee Kane made her exit in the season. On January 21, 2025, Emily Alabi joined the cast for season seven.

== Ratings ==
Viewership and ratings per episode of FBI season 7
No.	Title	Air date	Rating (18–49)	Viewers (millions)	DVR (18–49)	DVR viewers (millions)	Total (18–49)	Total viewers (millions)	Ref.
1	"Abandoned"	October 15, 2024	0.4	5.89	0.2	2.17	0.6	8.07	
2	"Trusted"	October 22, 2024	0.4	5.88	0.1	2.03	0.5	7.91	
3	"Détente"	October 29, 2024	0.4	5.61	0.1	2.05	0.5	7.67	
4	"Doubted"	November 12, 2024	0.4	6.31	0.1	1.92	0.5	8.24	
5	"Pledges"	November 19, 2024	0.4	6.55	0.2	2.07	0.6	8.62	
6	"Perfect"	December 3, 2024	0.4	6.66	0.1	1.83	0.6	8.49	
7	"Monumental"	December 10, 2024	0.4	6.58	0.1	1.94	0.5	8.52	
8	"Riptide"	December 17, 2024	0.4	6.68	0.1	1.93	0.5	8.61	
9	"Descent"	January 28, 2025	0.4	6.22	0.2	2.16	0.6	8.53	
10	"Redoubt"	February 4, 2025	0.4	5.98	0.1	1.96	0.5	7.94	
11	"Shelter"	February 11, 2025	0.4	6.05	0.1	1.92	0.5	7.97	
12	"Manhunt"	February 18, 2025	0.5	6.55	0.1	1.62	0.6	8.17	
13	"Unearth"	February 25, 2025	0.4	6.28	0.1	1.90	0.5	8.18	
14	"Hitched"	March 11, 2025	0.4	6.43	0.1	1.79	0.5	8.22	
15	"Acolyte"	March 18, 2025	0.4	6.19	—N/a	—N/a	—N/a	—N/a	
16	"Covered"	April 1, 2025	0.4	6.01	—N/a	—N/a	—N/a	—N/a	
17	"Lineage"	April 8, 2025	0.4	6.01	—N/a	—N/a	—N/a	—N/a	
18	"Blkpill"	April 15, 2025	0.4	5.77	—N/a	—N/a	—N/a	—N/a	
19	"Partner"	April 22, 2025	0.4	5.96	—N/a	—N/a	—N/a	—N/a	
20	"Startup"	May 6, 2025	0.3	5.64	—N/a	—N/a	—N/a	—N/a	
21	"Devoted"	May 13, 2025	0.4	5.73	—N/a	—N/a	—N/a	—N/a	
22	"A New Day"	May 20, 2025	0.4	6.17	—N/a	—N/a	—N/a	—N/a	
