= FBI season 3 =

Season of American television series

FBI
- Season 3
- Starring: Missy Peregrym; Zeeko Zaki; Jeremy Sisto; Alana de la Garza; John Boyd; Katherine Renee Turner
- No. of episodes: 15

Release
- Original network: CBS
- Original release: November 17, 2020 – May 25, 2021

Season chronology
- ← Previous; Season 2 Next → Season 4

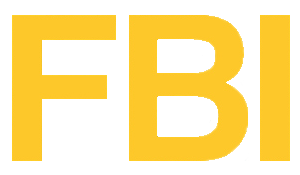
Text title for the series "FBI" on CBS.

The third season of FBI premiered on CBS on November 17, 2020, and concluded on May 25, 2021. A total of 15 episodes were produced.

== Cast and characters ==
=== Main ===
- Missy Peregrym as Maggie Bell, FBI Special Agent.
- Zeeko Zaki as Omar Adom "OA" Zidan, FBI Special Agent and Maggie's partner, West Point graduate, and a retired Army Ranger.
- John Boyd as Stuart Scola, FBI Special Agent and Kristen's, and later, Tiffany's field partner. He was a stock broker prior to joining the FBI.
- Katherine Renee Kane as Tiffany Wallace, FBI Special Agent and a former NYPD officer and White Collar Division agent. She is Kristen's replacement.
- Alana de la Garza as Special Agent-in-Charge (SAC) Isobel Castille, Mosier's replacement as the team's supervisor.
- Jeremy Sisto as Jubal Valentine, FBI Assistant Special Agent-in-Charge (ASAC), who runs the office's fusion center.

=== Recurring ===
- James Chen as Ian Lim, an FBI Technical Analyst.
- Thomas Phillip O'Neil as Dr. Neil Mosbach, an FBI Medical Examiner.
- Taylor Anthony Miller as Kelly Moran, an FBI Analyst.
- Roshawn Franklin as Trevor Hobbs, an FBI Special Agent and an Intelligence Analyst.
- Vedette Lim as Elise Taylor, an FBI Intelligence Analyst.
- Josh Segarra as Nestor Vertiz, an FBI Supervisory Special Agent.
- Kathleen Munroe as Rina Trenholm, FBI's Assistant Director in Charge of the New York Field Office.

=== Guest ===
- David Zayas as Antonio Vargas, the most notorious drug lord in the world and leader of the Durango Drug Cartel.

== Episodes ==
No. overall	No. in season	Title	Directed by	Written by	Original release date	Prod. code	U.S. viewers (millions)
42	1	"Never Trust a Stranger"	Alex Chapple	Rick Eid	November 17, 2020	FBI301	8.21
The team welcomes newcomer Tiffany Wallace, who is partnered with Scola. Maggie returns from her undercover assignment, just as the team investigates the shooting of employees at a media house. They trace the perpetrators to stem from a group of freedom fighters. The case becomes more complicated when O. A.'s informant, Zayne Wells, is revealed to have been the driver for the shooters. Zayne flees when O. A. and Maggie attempt to meet him, taking seven people hostage. They track a second assailant, who Wallace manages to stop before he enters the target location. O. A. goes in and manages to talk Zayne into surrendering. Later, Maggie prepares to leave to attend a ceremony where she'll be rewarded for her work in the undercover operation that saw many people being arrested and reveals to OA that she befriended a woman during the operation but was later forced to shoot her when the woman attempted to attack.: This episode is the debut appearance of Katherine Renee Kane (Tiffany Wallace)
43	2	"Unreasonable Doubt"	Jean de Segonzac	Tom Szentgyörgyi	November 24, 2020	FBI302	8.39
The discovery of three murdered women in a lake in Westchester County, makes Jubal revisit an old case he investigated eight years earlier where Cory McMay was convicted for allegedly murdering a woman in a similar way. Bell and Zidan are handed the old case, but do not discover anything new. Castille and a former colleague of Jubal, Rina Trenholm, question his intentions with revisiting the case. As another victim is discovered, Jubal decides to prove McMay's innocence.
44	3	"Liar's Poker"	Alex Chapple	Joe Halpin	December 8, 2020	FBI303	6.71
Upon arriving in New York, drug cartel leader Antonio Vargas' driver kills an NYPD officer while on a traffic stop. The FBI are called in to apprehend Vargas, but an explosion in one of his warehouses wounds several SWAT members. During interrogation, Vargas reveals he warned SWAT members of explosives, but was not believed. Agent Elise Taylor is kidnapped and sent to the FBI's New York office with a bomb around her neck. Vargas's men demand his release or the bomb will detonate, prompting Isobel to order the office to be evacuated with Jubal, Ian Lin and Kelly Moran staying behind to further investigate the case.
45	4	"Crazy Love"	Jean de Segonzac	Rick Eid & Tamara Jaron	January 24, 2021	FBI304	8.99
A shooting at a quinceañera leaves a 15-year-old girl and her mother dead in what seems to be a racially motived crime. However the FBI uncover that a waiter, Gabriel Ochela, was the intended target by the Latin Players Queens leader Jose Martinez. Ochela was targeted after Martinez learned that his girlfriend Valentina, was seeing him. Ochela is lured to a meeting place to supposedly meet Valentina, but is ambushed and killed by Martinez. The FBI brings in his girlfriend and make her an informant to get closer to Martinez. However, Nestor Vertiz's RICO investigation into Martinez forces Castille to put their investigation on hold for five days.
46	5	"Clean Slate"	Rose Troche	Claire Demorest	January 26, 2021	FBI305	8.27
Five-year-old Grace Harris is kidnapped from her parents' cabin while they're out by a campfire with friends. A man in the area, Don Kirkpatrick, reveals to the FBI he saw someone forcibly drag Grace from the scene. Suspicions turn to Grace's father, Ben, who is revealed to have changed his legal name after having been arrested for murdering ten-year-old Lucy Parkin when he was twelve.
47	6	"Uncovered"	Alex Chapple	Kristy Lowrey	February 9, 2021	FBI306	7.72
Armored robbers steal a small ammonia tank from a harbor, leaving two toll officers dead and one severely injured, who manages to injure one of the perpetrators. The team uncover that the gang is not making meth, but a bomb.
48	7	"Discord"	Carlos Bernard	Andy Callahan	March 2, 2021	FBI307	7.36
Congressman Logan Reed is shot and killed at his home after a brick is thrown through his window in a string of seemingly unrelated targets. During the case, Wallace clashes with Thomas' daughter over her stance with the black community.
49	8	"Walk the Line"	Mykelti Williamson	Rick Eid	March 9, 2021	FBI308	7.66
A car bomb detonates in a street after another car with a loudspeaker causes a distraction a block away. The FBI narrows in on a suspect pool of a Middle Eastern restaurant owner, Hassan Ali, and his associates. Rina Trenholm steps in to assist, calling on an informant of hers, Vega Assad, to help but he surprisingly refuses. During the case, O. A. struggles to satisfy the bureau and protect Vega simultaneously.
50	9	"Leverage"	John Polson	Erica Meredith	March 16, 2021	FBI309	8.07
Political journalist Addie Ricard is kidnapped while on the way home. The FBI learns she was involved with political higher-ups, having had a discussion with United States Senator Walter Hoffman's chief of staff, Ethan Shaw. Meanwhile, Isobel's relationship comes under fire when a connection is made between the suspect and her boyfriend.
51	10	"Checks and Balances"	Stephen Surjik	Tamara Jaron & Claire Demorest	April 6, 2021	FBI310	8.07
Howard Kirkland, a security officer who notably patrolled the 26 Fed, is shot and killed in a bank robbery. The FBI is assisted by the NYPD, and track down the original robbers. Scola and Wallace collide on the issue of having her former superior, Frank Dixon, and his partner Roger Palmer, involved in the investigation. The tension between the two only increases when evidence suggests that Palmer was involved.
52	11	"Brother's Keeper"	Alex Chapple	Tom Szentgyörgyi	April 27, 2021	FBI311	7.57
ATF group supervisor Henry Lasher, is injured when a package bomb detonates in his home, killing his husband Russel Griffin in the process. The FBI connect the bombing with Mark Frazier, who becomes a person of interest. Frazier reveals that a rant blog post the FBI has discovered was posted by his brother, Richard, who is mentally unstable. Frazier reveals his brother is targeting anyone or anything related to an artificial intelligence program, Aurora, because he fears machines are taking over from humans. Meanwhile Maggie deals with the arrival of her sister, Erin, in New York, and grows skeptical and suspects she is on drugs again, which proves her right when she discovers pills in her dorm.
53	12	"Fathers and Sons"	Stephen Surjik	Rick Eid & Joe Halpin	May 4, 2021	FBI312	8.08
Anasthesiologist Dr Nichole Wright is abducted near the hospital where she works and the FBIs oon discover that another doctor, Lucas Caldwell, was also abducted from his home by the same person. The kidnapper is later revealed to be a former Mexican soldier, Octavio Diaz, who kidnapped the doctors to perform kidney surgery on his twelve-year-old son, Tony. Meanwhile, Jubal learns from his ex-wife, that his son has been feeling sick, which is later revealed to be caused by leukaemia. The doctors say it is curable, given it was discovered at an early stage.
54	13	"Short Squeeze"	Joanna Kerns	Rick Eid & Joe Halpin	May 11, 2021	FBI313	7.69
Wall Street CEO of ‘Regular Joe’, Tim Davis, is murdered outside the SEC while talking to protesters. Scola confronts ‘Kix’ CEO Nathan Gold, who was present at the protest against Davis' company, putting his job on the line. Scola is knocked out by a new assailant and Gold is kidnapped. The new assailant's motives are revealed to be against Kix, alleging the company to be fraudulent. During the case, Scola's reveals his previous Wall Street career and the reasons he left.
55	14	"Trigger Effect"	Monica Raymund	Andy Callahan & Tamara Jaron & Kristy Lowrey	May 18, 2021	FBI314	7.59
A shooting in a local restaurant in Morningside Heights leave several people dead and multiple injured. The FBI turns its focus to Fraudster, a company whose aim is to reveal people's darker secrets, after the assailant kidnaps its chief, Maria Muños. They track her location to her home, only to find her dead. The FBI learns that Olsen's firm partner, Bob Avery, was fired after alleged pictures of him being published, implying him to be a pedophile. Meanwhile, Bell convinces Elise to seek counsel after she expresses suffering from trauma from her bomb incident.
56	15	"Straight Flush"	Alex Chapple	Teleplay by : Rick Eid & Joe Halpin; Story by : Claire Demorest & Heather Michaels	May 25, 2021	FBI315	7.08
Castille and the New York office are forced to return their focus to Durango drug leader Antonio Vargas after his biological son, Felix Serrano, is killed in a trendy hotel along with four other wealthy men. Castille's team arrests Miguel Rojas for the murders, who is revealed to be a Durango lieutenant going against Vargas. They have him wear a wire upon Vargas's return, but he shoots him before he is arrested. Rita Trenholm is made acting assistant director, and causes friction with Castille and Jubal over relaying ongoing information. Castille dispatches Bell and Zidan to Mexico to use Vargas's wife and younger son as leverage against him. Vargas reveals that three bombs have been planted in Grand Central Station. Bell sneaks into Vargas' house and films his wife and younger son, which Castille uses against Vargas, forcing him to give up the code for the bombs, and he is subsequently arrested. Trenholm is offered the assistant director position permanently, which she accepts, while also entering a relationship with Jubal.

== Production ==
On May 6, 2020, CBS announced that FBI was renewed for a third season.

On August 28, 2020, Katherine Renee Turner was cast as a series regular for the third season.

== Release ==
The season premiered on November 17, 2020.

== Ratings ==
Viewership and ratings per episode of FBI season 3
No.	Title	Air date	Rating (18–49)	Viewers (millions)	DVR (18–49)	DVR viewers (millions)	Total (18–49)	Total viewers (millions)
1	"Never Trust a Stranger"	November 17, 2020	0.9	8.21	0.4	3.38	1.3	11.62
2	"Unreasonable Doubt"	November 24, 2020	0.9	8.39	—N/a	—N/a	—N/a	—N/a
3	"Liar's Poker"	December 8, 2020	0.6	6.71	0.4	3.02	1.1	9.72
4	"Crazy Love"	January 24, 2021	2.0	8.99	—N/a	—N/a	—N/a	—N/a
5	"Clean Slate"	January 26, 2021	0.8	8.27	—N/a	—N/a	—N/a	—N/a
6	"Uncovered"	February 9, 2021	0.8	7.72	0.5	3.43	1.3	11.16
7	"Discord"	March 2, 2021	0.7	7.36	0.4	3.41	1.1	10.78
8	"Walk the Line"	March 9, 2021	0.7	7.66	0.5	3.46	1.2	11.12
9	"Leverage"	March 16, 2021	0.8	8.07	—N/a	—N/a	—N/a	—N/a
10	"Checks and Balances"	April 6, 2021	0.8	8.07	0.5	3.11	1.2	11.19
11	"Brother's Keeper"	April 27, 2021	0.7	7.57	0.4	2.50	1.1	10.07
12	"Fathers and Sons"	May 4, 2021	0.8	8.08	0.4	3.11	1.2	11.17
13	"Short Squeeze"	May 11, 2021	0.7	7.69	0.5	3.24	1.2	10.94
14	"Trigger Effect"	May 18, 2021	0.7	7.59	0.4	3.07	1.1	10.67
15	"Straight Flush"	May 25, 2021	0.6	7.08	0.4	3.17	1.1	10.25
