= FBI (TV series) =

American television series (2018–present)

- Genre: Crime drama; Police procedural; Action
- Created by: Dick Wolf; Craig Turk
- Starring: Missy Peregrym; Zeeko Zaki; Ebonée Noel; Sela Ward; Jeremy Sisto; Alana de la Garza; John Boyd; Katherine Renee Kane; Lisette Olivera; Juliana Aidén Martinez
- Composer: Atli Örvarsson
- Country of origin: United States
- Original language: English
- No. of seasons: 9
- No. of episodes: 164 (list of episodes)

Production
- Executive producers: Dick Wolf; Arthur W. Forney; Peter Jankowski; Craig Turk; Greg Plageman; Terry Miller; Rick Eid; Norberto Barba; Mike Weiss
- Producers: Amanda Slater; Brian Anthony; Aaron Fullerton; Mo Masi; Missy Peregrym
- Running time: 44 minutes
- Production companies: Wolf Entertainment; CBS Studios (Note: Credited as CBS Television Studios (seasons 1–2)); Universal Television

Original release
- Network: CBS
- Release: September 25, 2018 – present

Related
- FBI: Most Wanted; FBI: International; CIA

FBI is an American police procedural drama television series created by Dick Wolf and Craig Turk that premiered on CBS on September 25, 2018. The show follows the cases and agents of the Federal Bureau of Investigation (FBI) New York City Field Office in New York City.

FBI received a straight-to-series commission for 13 episodes on September 20, 2017. The series features an ensemble cast including Missy Peregrym, Zeeko Zaki, Jeremy Sisto, Ebonée Noel, Sela Ward, Alana de la Garza, John Boyd, Katherine Renee Kane, Lisette Olivera and Juliana Aidén Martinez.

In April 2024, the series was renewed through its ninth season, ensuring its airing through the 2026–2027 network television schedule. The ninth season premiered on October 5, 2026.

== Cast ==
=== Main ===
- Missy Peregrym as Maggie Bell (season 1–present), FBI Special Agent and OA's partner.
- Zeeko Zaki as Omar Adom "OA" Zidan (season 1–present), FBI Special Agent and Maggie's partner, West Point graduate, and a retired Army Ranger
- Ebonée Noel as Kristen Chazal (seasons 1–2), FBI Special Agent (formerly an Intelligence Analyst), it is revealed she transferred to Dallas Field Office at the start of Season 3
- Sela Ward as Dana Mosier (season 1), FBI Special Agent in Charge (SAC) and the team's supervisor
- Jeremy Sisto as Jubal Valentine (season 1–present), FBI Assistant Special Agent in Charge (ASAC) and Second-in-Command of the office's fusion center
- Alana de la Garza as Isobel Castille (season 2–present; guest: season 1), FBI Special Agent in Charge (SAC) and Mosier's replacement as the team's supervisor
- John Boyd as Stuart Scola (season 2–present), FBI Special Agent and Kristen's, and later, Tiffany's field partner. He was a stockbroker prior to joining the FBI.
- Katherine Renee Kane as Tiffany Wallace (seasons 3–6; guest: season 7), FBI Special Agent and a former NYPD officer and White Collar Division agent, as well as Kristen's replacement.
- Lisette Olivera as Sydney "Syd" Ortiz (season 7), a new FBI Special Agent working for the Behavioral Analysis Unit and Scola's temporary partner
- Juliana Aidén Martinez as Eva Ramos (season 8–present), FBI Special Agent and Scola's new partner after Dani Rhodes's death. In her previous field office, she has been in a relationship with a colleague, who turned out to be a member of Forefront.

=== Recurring ===
- Derek Hedlund as Special Agent JT (seasons 1–2), an FBI Special Agent who frequently worked in the field with OA and Maggie.
- James Chen as Ian Lim (season 1–present), an FBI Technical Analyst
- Thomas Phillip O'Neil as Dr. Neil Mosbach (season 1–present), an FBI Medical Examiner
- Carmen Lamar Gonzalez as Carla Flores (season 1–present), an FBI bomb disposal expert
- Rodney Richardson as Ray Stapleton (season 1), an FBI Forensic Technician
- Nina Lisandrello as Eve Nettles (season 1), an FBI Forensic Technician
- Taylor Anthony Miller as Kelly Moran (season 2–present), an FBI Analyst
- Roshawn Franklin as Trevor Hobbs (seasons 2–6), an FBI Special Agent and an Intelligence Analyst
- Vedette Lim as Elise Taylor (season 2–present), an FBI Intelligence Analyst
- Catherine Haena Kim as Emily Ryder (season 2), an FBI Special Agent who temporarily fills in for Kristen when she is injured in the line of duty
- Josh Segarra as Nestor Vertiz (season 3), an FBI Supervisory Special Agent who worked on an undercover operation with Maggie and dated her before he ended their relationship in the FBI Season 3 episode, "Uncovered". He is also in charge of the Gang Unit.
- David Zayas as Antonio Vargas (seasons 3–4), the most notorious drug lord in the world and leader of the Durango Cartel.
- Piter Marek as Rashid Bashir (season 4), FBI Special Agent in Charge of Counterterrorism.
- Mara Davi as Samantha Kelton (seasons 1–5, 7–8), Jubal Valentine's ex-wife.
- Emily Alabi as Dani Rhodes (seasons 7–8), FBI Special Agent and Ortiz's replacement as Scola's partner.

=== Special guest stars ===
- Connie Nielsen as Ellen Solberg ("Pilot"), Special Agent in Charge (SAC) and the team's initial supervisor
- Billy Burke as Rowan Quinn, an FBI Supervisory Special Agent and undercover trainer who trained OA on undercover assignments. He was also FBI Special Agent Maggie Bell's UC instructor during her time at Quantico.
- R. Ward Duffy as John Van Leer, FBI Deputy Director

=== Crossover characters ===
- Julian McMahon as Jess LaCroix (seasons 1–2, 4), FBI Supervisory Special Agent and Team Leader assigned to the Fugitive Task Force (FBI: Most Wanted)
- Kellan Lutz as Kenny Crosby (seasons 1–2, 4), FBI Special Agent in the Fugitive Task Force (FBI: Most Wanted)
- Roxy Sternberg as Sheryll Barnes (seasons 1–2, 5), FBI Special Agent and Second-in-Command assigned to the Fugitive Task Force (FBI: Most Wanted)
- Keisha Castle-Hughes as Hana Gibson (seasons 1–2, 5), FBI Special Agent and Technical Analyst assigned to the Fugitive Task Force (FBI: Most Wanted)
- Nathaniel Arcand as Clinton Skye (season 1), FBI Special Agent assigned to the Fugitive Task Force as well as Jess LaCroix's brother in law and the uncle of Tali, Jess's daughter (FBI: Most Wanted)
- YaYa Gosselin as Tali Skye LaCroix (season 1–2), the daughter of Jess LaCroix (FBI: Most Wanted)
- Tracy Spiridakos as Detective Hailey Upton (season 2), a member of the Intelligence Unit for the Chicago Police Department (Chicago P.D.) who temporarily joins the NY field office for an interagency training program
- Luke Kleintank as Scott Forrester (season 5), an FBI Supervisory Special Agent and Head of the International Fly Team.
- Heida Reed as Jamie Kellet (season 5), FBI Special Agent and second in command of the FBI's International Fly Team (FBI: International)
- Carter Redwood as Andre Raines (season 5), FBI Special Agent and a member of the FBI's International Fly Team (FBI: International)
- Vinessa Vidotto as Cameron Vo (season 5), FBI Special Agent and a member of the FBI's International Fly Team (FBI: International)
- Dylan McDermott as Remy Scott (season 5), an FBI Supervisory Special Agent and Head of the Fugitive Taskforce (FBI: Most Wanted)
- Necar Zadegan as Nikki Reynard (seasons 8-9), the Deputy Chief of the CIA's New York station (CIA)

== Episodes ==
Season	Episodes	Originally released		Rank	Viewers (millions)
Season	Episodes	First released	Last released	Rank	Viewers (millions)
1	22	September 25, 2018	May 14, 2019	11	12.37
2	19	September 24, 2019	March 31, 2020	4	12.55
3	15	November 17, 2020	May 25, 2021	5	10.98
4	21	September 21, 2021	May 12, 2022	4	10.29
5	23	September 20, 2022	May 23, 2023	4	9.52
6	13	February 13, 2024	May 21, 2024	6	8.82
7	22	October 15, 2024	May 20, 2025	12	10.42
8	22	October 13, 2025	May 18, 2026	20	8.90
9	TBA	October 5, 2026	TBA	TBA	TBA

== Production ==
=== Development ===
The origins of the series go back to the Television Critics Association summer 2016 press tour, where Wolf revealed plans for a crime drama series, placed in New York and set in the world of the FBI. Wolf's original plan was to introduce it on the NBC network as a planned spin-off to his New York crime drama Law & Order: Special Victims Unit, where it was intended to introduce an FBI agent character, but NBC ultimately did not go through with it and the idea was later put on hold for different reasons. It's Wolf's first drama series to launch on a network other than NBC in 15 years. CBS officially picked up the series on September 20, 2017. The series is produced by CBS Television Studios and Universal Television.

On January 25, 2019, during the TCA press tour, FBI was renewed for a second season, which was set to premiere on September 24, 2019. On May 7, 2019, following the renewal it was announced that Milena Govich joined as co-executive producer and director.

On March 12, 2020, Universal Television suspended the production of the last three episodes of the second season following the COVID-19 pandemic. However, on May 6, 2020, CBS announced that it was renewed for a third season which premiered on November 17, 2020. On March 24, 2021, CBS announced that it had renewed the series for a fourth season, which premiered on September 21, 2021.

On May 9, 2022, CBS renewed the series for a fifth and sixth season. The fifth season premiered on September 20, 2022. The sixth season premiered on February 13, 2024. On April 9, 2024, CBS renewed the series for seasons seven through nine. The seventh season premiered on October 15, 2024. The eighth season premiered on October 13, 2025. The ninth season premiered on October 5, 2026.

=== Casting ===
On March 1, 2018, Zeeko Zaki was cast as OA. A week later, Jeremy Sisto was cast as Jubal, including Ebonée Noel also cast as Kristin. A week later, Missy Peregrym was cast as Maggie. The FBI Special Agent in Charge in the first episode ("Pilot") was Ellen Solberg, played by Connie Nielsen. On May 16, 2018, the day of scheduling the series for fall 2018, Nielsen was announced to leave the series for undisclosed reasons.

On July 13, 2018, Sela Ward was cast in the second episode as Dana Mosier who fulfills a similar role to Connie Nielsen who was in the first episode. During the season finale, it was indicated that Ward would be departing the series after the first season. On July 9, 2019, Alana de la Garza—who played Isobel Castille in a guest appearance in the first season—was promoted to the main cast for the second season; she also recurs on the spin-off series FBI: Most Wanted.

On August 6, 2019, John Boyd was cast as Special Agent Stuart Scola, Kristin's new partner in the field, in a recurring role with the option to be promoted to regular at a later date. Boyd was promoted to regular on October 7, 2019. On August 28, 2020, Katherine Renee Kane and Kathleen Munroe were cast as series regulars for the third season. On April 20, 2022, it was announced that Shantel VanSanten would return as Special Agent Nina Chase in a recurring role. On August 19, 2024, Lisette Olivera joined the cast as a new series regular for the seventh while Kane exited in the seventh season. On January 21, 2025, Emily Alabi joined the cast for season seven. On July 14, 2025, Juliana Aidén Martinez was cast as a series regular for the eighth season.

=== Broadcast and release ===
The series premiered on CBS in the United States on September 25, 2018. The first two seasons aired on Tuesdays at 9:00 p.m. after NCIS. After NCIS moved to Mondays during the 2021–22 U.S. television season, the series moved up to 8:00 p.m. with the launch of its second spin-off FBI: International. The show moved to Mondays at 9:00 p.m. EST/8 p.m. CST beginning in fall 2025.

In the United Kingdom and Republic of Ireland, new episodes of FBI begin airing usually on a Thursday night at 9pm on Sky Witness. With FBI season 8 having concluded, CIA season 1 began airing in FBI's original time slot, beginning on Thursday July 23 at 9pm with the finale episode of CIA season 1, "Broken Glass" airing on Thursday October 8 in the United Kingdom and Republic of Ireland at 9pm, two days after the new seasons, FBI season 9 and CIA season 2 began airing in the United States on Monday October 5, 2026.

=== Syndication ===
As of November 2025, the show currently airs reruns on Ion Television, Pop, and TNT. The full series is available on Paramount+.

== Reception ==
=== Critical response ===
On the review aggregator website Rotten Tomatoes, the first season has an approval rating of 63% based on 24 reviews, with an average rating of 6.22 out of 10. The website's critical consensus reads, "Dick Wolf's new series sports a compelling cast and adrenaline-spiking spectacle, although some viewers may find this retread of the mega-producer's previous procedural formulas overly familiar." Metacritic, which uses a weighted average, assigned a score of 57 out of 100 based on 13 critics, indicating "mixed or average reviews".

=== Ratings ===
Viewership and ratings per season of FBI
Season	Timeslot (ET)	Episodes	First aired		Last aired		TV season	Viewership rank	Avg. viewers (millions)
Season	Timeslot (ET)	Episodes	Date	Viewers (millions)	Date	Viewers (millions)	TV season	Viewership rank	Avg. viewers (millions)
1	Tuesday 9:00 p.m.	22	September 25, 2018	10.09	May 14, 2019	8.56	2018–19	11	12.37
2	Tuesday 9:00 p.m.	19	September 24, 2019	8.83	March 31, 2020	10.85	2019–20	4	12.55
3	Tuesday 9:00 p.m.	15	November 17, 2020	8.21	May 25, 2021	7.08	2020–21	5	10.98
4	Tuesday 8:00 p.m.	21	September 21, 2021	7.12	May 17, 2022	7.15	2021–22	4	10.29
5	Tuesday 8:00 p.m.	23	September 20, 2022	6.81	May 23, 2023	6.54	2022–23	4	9.52
6	Tuesday 8:00 p.m.	13	February 13, 2024	7.70	May 21, 2024	6.14	2023–24	6	8.82
7	Tuesday 8:00 p.m.	22	October 15, 2024	5.89	May 20, 2025	6.17	2024–25	12	10.42
8	Monday 9:00 p.m. (1–8, 10–21); Monday 8:00 p.m. (9, 22)	22	October 13, 2025	4.43	May 18, 2026	5.39	2025–26	20	8.90
9	Monday 8:00 p.m.	TBA	October 5, 2026	5.53	TBA	TBD	2026–27	TBD	TBD

== Spin-offs ==
On January 29, 2019, it was announced that CBS had commissioned a backdoor pilot with an attached series commitment for a potential spin-off series titled FBI: Most Wanted, with the episode to air in the latter part of the first season. The series will focus on the division of the FBI tasked with tracking and capturing the most notorious criminals on the FBI's Most Wanted list. According to Dick Wolf, the spin-off is set to launch a series of interconnected shows similar to Wolf's Chicago and Law & Order franchises on NBC. Actors who have been cast were reported to be: Julian McMahon, Alana de la Garza, Kellan Lutz, Roxy Sternberg, and Nathaniel Arcand, as well as Keisha Castle-Hughes. On May 9, 2019, CBS announced that FBI: Most Wanted had been ordered to series. The series, created by René Balcer, premiered on January 7, 2020.

On February 18, 2021, it was reported that a third series of the FBI franchise with the working title FBI: International spin-off was in development. On March 24, 2021, CBS announced that the spin-off had been ordered to series. On July 8, 2021, it was reported that Luke Kleintank, Heida Reed and Vinessa Vidotto were set to casts in the spin-off and it premiered in September 2021.

In March 2025, both spin-offs were cancelled at CBS, weeks after the report that another spin-off was in development, which had prompted speculation about the future of the original spinoffs.

On January 22, 2025, it had been reported the new potential spin-off would be called FBI: CIA, with the same New York City setting as the original, with a focus on investigating domestic terrorism. According to reports, a possible backdoor pilot, co-written by FBI: Most Wanted showrunner David Hudgins and a former CIA office, with three new characters was expected to air during FBI's seventh season in spring 2025. Two months later, it was reported that after the proposed backdoor pilot had been repeatedly pushed back toward the end of the season, the series was instead being considered for a straight-to-series pick-up with a title change but without the backdoor pilot launch, and with a new script, as casting was still underway and FBI was nearing the end of production for the season. In April 2025, it was announced Tom Ellis had been cast in one of the leading roles of the series, with the show getting a straight-to-series order for the upcoming season, with Hudgins as showrunner and a first episode set to be directed and produced by Eriq La Salle.

In May 2025, ahead of the upfronts, a CBS teaser first revealed Ellis' character as a CIA case officer called Hart Hoxton. The series, now called CIA, was announced to premiere in fall 2025 in a Monday 10 p.m. time slot after the original. At the time, CBS executive Amy Reisenbach commented about the prospect of three shows with acronyms airing after each other that "Marketing will have a lot of fun with it, and so will Stephen Colbert." Colbert had mocked the original title of the series on The Late Show the day after it was announced, mirroring a Deadline Hollywood comparison to the Adult Swim parody series NTSF:SD:SUV:..

In an interview published at the end of June 2025, Ellis said he had been doing chemistry reads as part of casting for a partner on the show, and confirmed his character would be American. In July 2025, with no further casting announced, it was revealed that the series had been pushed to midseason 2026, with Warren Leight taking over as showrunner from Hudgins. Siobhan Byrne O'Connor is listed as having role as a consulting producer.

Production began in New York City in September 2025 after additional casting announcements. In November 2025 it was reported that Michael Michele would be leaving the series several weeks after starting production. La Salle directed the pilot, but was reported to have left the role of executive producer of the series in November 2025. Later that month, it was reported that Leight was departing the series, which would briefly pause production, with Mike Weiss set to take over in addition to his role on the main series. It was announced in November 2025 that the spin-off would premiere on February 23, 2026, in a 10 p.m. Monday timeslot following the original show.
