= Katherine Renee Kane =

American actress

- Born: December 21, 1991 (age 34); Washington, D.C., United States
- Occupation: Actress
- Years active: 2011–present

Katherine Renee Kane (born December 21, 1991) is an American actress. She is best known for playing Tiffany Wallace in the police TV series FBI.

== Personal life ==
Kane, also known as Katherine Renee Turner, was born in Washington, D.C. She was engaged to Eddie Ray Jackson in 2014.

== Career ==
She obtained a BFA in acting from Ithaca College before graduating from the Juilliard School. Her biggest role so far has been playing Tiffany Wallace in the police TV series FBI beginning in Season 3 in fall 2020. It was revealed in August 2024 at the start of season 7 that Kane would be leaving the show. While no reason was given initially it was believed to be due to budget cuts, although later confirmed it was the actor's choice and her role would be replaced.

== Filmography ==
=== Film ===
Year	Title	Role	Notes
2011	Ward 11	Dr. Henley	Short
2012	Wintersmith	Talia	Short
2016	Extra Ordinary	Mae	
2017	Live a Little	Jackson	
2018	The Bag	The friend	Short

=== Television ===
Year	Title	Role	Notes
2011	The RAs	Farrah Barnes	2 episodes
2020–2024	FBI	Tiffany Wallace	73 episodes
2023	FBI: Most Wanted	Tiffany Wallace	Episode; Imminent Threat: Part Three
