= Roshawn Franklin =

American actor (born 1982)

- Born: June 27, 1982 (age 44); Forrest City, Arkansas
- Years active: 2000–present

Roshawn Franklin (born June 27, 1982) is an American actor. Franklin is best known for portraying FBI Special Agent Hobbs on the crime drama series FBI.

== Life and career ==
Franklin was born in Forrest City, Arkansas, on June 27, 1982. His mother Gwendolyn, was 21 years old when she gave birth to Franklin. He eventually moved to Pomona, California. Franklin's acting career began at the age of 14, when he was discovered by a talent agent in Los Angeles.

Franklin's acting career began with small roles on multiple TV series. In 2000, he guest starred on the TV show Opposite Sex. Franklin has appeared in other guest starring television roles over the years including on the shows Grey’s Anatomy, Bones, NCIS, NCIS Los Angeles. He played the recurring role of Officer Ray Terrapin on the soap opera The Haves and the Have Nots.

In 2015, he guest starred in Castle, appearing in the season 7 episode Habeas Corpse. He played Ali Davis in the 2019 romantic comedy What Men Want?.

Since 2019, he's been portraying the role of Special Agent Trevor Hobbs on the drama series FBI.

== Filmography ==
Film and Television
Year	Title	Role	Notes
2000	Love & Basketball	USC Player (uncredited)	
2000	Opposite Sex	Joe	TV series; 2 episodes
2001	JAG	Private Sterling	TV series; Episode: "Miracles"
2001	Recoil	Victor Simmons	
2001	City Guys	Paul Phillips	TV series; Episode: "Model Behavior"
2002	Sabrina the Teenage Witch	Jim	TV series; Episode: "The Arrangement"
2002	One on One	Jack Payton	TV series; Episode: "I Believe I Can Fly: Part 2"
2003	Boomtown	Marcus Smith	TV series; Episode: "Blackout"
2003	My Wife and Kids	Donovan Macontyre	TV series; Episode: "Not So Hostile Takeover"
2003	The District	Lance	TV series; Episode: "In God We Trust"
2003–2004	7th Heaven	Sinatra	TV series; 3 episodes
2004	Like Family	Todd Hall	TV series; 2 episodes
2004	Without a Trace	Evan Young	TV series; Episode: "The Season"
2004	NYPD Blue	Sammy	TV series; Episode: "The Vision Thing"
2005	Strong Medicine	Chris Jefferys	
2006	Weeds	Steven	TV series; Episode: "Cooking with Jesus"
2007	NCIS	Crew Chief Rogers	TV series; Episode: "Chimera"
2007	Nip/Tuck	Keith	TV series; Episode: "Chaz Darling"
2008	Scrubs	Olympic Athlete	TV series; Episode: "My Manhood"
2009	24	Cimbe	2 episodes
2010	Grey's Anatomy	Todd Holmes	TV series; Episode: "Push"
2012	NCIS: Los Angeles	Commander Williams	TV series; Episode: "Recruit"
2013	Rizzoli & Isles	CRSU Tech	TV series; Episode: "Built for Speed"
2013	Thor: The Dark World	Jenson (uncredited)	
2014	Captain America: The Winter Soldier	Virtual DC Cop (uncredited)	
2014	Bones	Carl Collins	TV series; Episode: "The High in the Low"
2013–2015	Castle	Federal Agent Smith	2 episodes
2018	Nashville	Ken	TV series; Episode: "Jump Then Fall"
2019	What Men Want	Ali Davis	
2019	The Haves and the Have Nots	Officer Ray Terrapin	5 episodes
2019–2024	FBI	Special Agent Trevor Hobbs	TV series; Recurring
2020	Surviving in L.A.	Jerome	
2021	Redeemed	Andre Leath	
