= FBI (franchise) =

FBI Television franchise page

FBI franchise
- Logo for the franchise
- Created by: FBI; Dick Wolf; Craig Turk; FBI: Most Wanted; René Balcer; FBI: International; Dick Wolf; Derek Haas; CIA; Dick Wolf; David Hudgins; Nicole Perlman; David Chasteen; Warren Leight
- Original work: FBI
- Owners: Wolf Entertainment; CBS Studios

Films and television
- Television series: FBI; FBI: Most Wanted; FBI: International; CIA; The FBI Declassified; FBI True

The FBI franchise, also known as The FBIs, is an American media franchise composed of four fictional television series on CBS. It began with the premiere of FBI in 2018 and has since been expanded with spin-offs FBI: Most Wanted, FBI: International, and CIA. All four series are produced by Wolf Entertainment.

Multiple characters have appeared in more than one series of the franchise through occasional crossover appearances and the franchise has also had crossover events. The franchise is also connected to Wolf Entertainment's Chicago franchise and the Law & Order franchise, through an appearance by Tracy Spiridakos in FBI, as her character from Chicago P.D.

Four television series make up the FBI franchise: FBI, Most Wanted, International, and CIA. All series in total amount to 361 episodes across 21 seasons of television.

== Television series ==
=== FBI (2018–present) ===
The first series in the FBI franchise focuses on the inner workings of the New York office criminal division of the Federal Bureau of Investigation (FBI). This elite unit brings to bear all their talents, intellect, and technical expertise on major cases in order to keep New York and the country safe.

=== FBI: Most Wanted (2020–2025) ===
Most Wanted centers on the work of the Federal Bureau of Investigation's (FBI) Fugitive Task Force (FTF), a small and unique team designed to track and capture notorious fugitives on the Bureau's Most Wanted List. The series focuses on profiling and analyzing fugitives to catch them unlike FBI and FBI: International, that focuses more about the crime and investigation itself.

=== FBI: International (2021–2025) ===
International follows the elite operatives in the Federal Bureau of Investigation's (FBI) International Fly Team (IFT) which is headquartered in Budapest. They are charged with locating and neutralizing threats against American interests in Europe.

=== CIA (2026–present) ===
Spin-off focusing on a partnership between an FBI agent and a CIA agent who work together on a clandestine taskforce to prevent domestic terrorism in New York.

== Related shows ==
=== The FBI Declassified (2020–2021) ===
The FBI Declassified gives viewers unprecedented access to some of the biggest cases handled by real-life FBI agents and analysts. The episodes were narrated by Alana de la Garza who appears in the fictional shows as Isobel Castille.

=== FBI True (2023–present) ===
Follows the world of real FBI agents using surveillance video, interrogations with hostage takers and terrorists, and photos from the agents' collections to tell their real life stories. While this show has no connection to the franchise, it's seen as a successor to The FBI Declassified.

== Series overview ==
Four television series make up the FBI franchise: FBI, Most Wanted, International, and CIA. All series in total amount to 361 episodes across 21 seasons of television.

Series	Season	Episodes	Originally released		Rank	Rating
Series	Season	Episodes	First released	Last released	Rank	Rating
FBI	1	22	September 25, 2018	May 14, 2019	11	12.37
FBI	2	19	September 24, 2019	March 31, 2020	4	12.55
FBI	3	15	November 17, 2020	May 25, 2021	5	10.98
FBI	4	21	September 21, 2021	May 17, 2022	4	10.29
FBI	5	23	September 20, 2022	May 23, 2023	4	9.52
FBI	6	13	February 13, 2024	May 21, 2024	7	8.96
FBI	7	22	October 15, 2024	May 20, 2025	6	8.00
FBI	8	TBA	October 13, 2025	TBA	TBA	TBA
FBI: Most Wanted	Backdoor pilot		April 2, 2019		—N/a	9.08
FBI: Most Wanted	1	14	January 7, 2020	May 5, 2020	17	10.20
FBI: Most Wanted	2	15	November 17, 2020	May 25, 2021	14	8.83
FBI: Most Wanted	3	22	September 21, 2021	May 24, 2022	12	8.75
FBI: Most Wanted	4	22	September 20, 2022	May 23, 2023	14	8.02
FBI: Most Wanted	5	13	February 13, 2024	May 21, 2024	18	7.38
FBI: Most Wanted	6	22	October 15, 2024	May 20, 2025	TBA	TBA
FBI: International	1	21	September 21, 2021	May 24, 2022	16	8.23
FBI: International	2	22	September 20, 2022	May 23, 2023	15	7.74
FBI: International	3	13	February 13, 2024	May 21, 2024	20	7.20
FBI: International	4	22	October 15, 2024	May 20, 2025	TBA	TBA

== Main cast ==
Series	Character	Position	Portrayed by	Duration	Appearances			
Series	Character	Position	Portrayed by	Duration	Franchise			
Series	Character	Position	Portrayed by	Duration	FBI	FBI: Most Wanted	FBI: International	CIA
FBI	Maggie Bell	FBI Special Agent	Missy Peregrym	2018–present	Main	Guest		
FBI	Omar Adom "OA" Zidan	FBI Special Agent	Zeeko Zaki	2018–present	Main	Guest		
FBI	Jubal Valentine	FBI Assistant Special Agent in Charge	Jeremy Sisto	2018–present	Main	Guest	Recurring	
FBI	Kristen Chazal	FBI Special Agent / Intelligence Analyst	Ebonée Noel	2018–2020	Main	Guest		
FBI	Dana Mosier	FBI Special Agent in Charge	Sela Ward	2018–2019	Main			
FBI	Isobel Castille	FBI Special Agent in Charge	Alana de la Garza	2019–present	Main	Recurring (Note: De la Garza was initially cast to portray Isobel on FBI: Most Wanted, and debuted in the role in its backdoor pilot. However, prior to the premiere of FBI: Most Wanted, de la Garza was instead cast on FBI, to replace the departing Sela Ward.)	Guest	
FBI	Stuart Scola	FBI Special Agent	John Boyd	2019–present	Main	Guest		
FBI	Tiffany Wallace	FBI Special Agent	Katherine Renee Kane	2020–2024	Main	Guest		
FBI	Syd Ortiz	FBI Special Agent	Lisette Olivera	2024	Main			
FBI	Eva Ramos	FBI Special Agent	Juliana Aidén Martinez	2025–present	Main			
FBI: Most Wanted	Jess LaCroix	FBI Fugitive Task Force; Supervisory Special Agent	Julian McMahon	2019–2022	Guest	Main	Guest	
FBI: Most Wanted	Kenny Crosby	FBI Fugitive Task Force; Special Agent	Kellan Lutz	2019–2021	Guest	Main	Guest	
FBI: Most Wanted	Sheryll Barnes	FBI Fugitive Task Force; Special Agent	Roxy Sternberg	2019–2025	Guest	Main		
FBI: Most Wanted	Hana Gibson	FBI Fugitive Task Force; Special Agent / Intelligence Analyst	Keisha Castle-Hughes	2019–2025	Guest	Main		
FBI: Most Wanted	Clinton Skye	FBI Fugitive Task Force; Special Agent	Nathaniel Arcand	2019–2020	Guest	Main		
FBI: Most Wanted	Tali Skye LaCroix		YaYa Gosselin	2019–2022	Guest	Main		
FBI: Most Wanted	Ivan Ortiz	FBI Fugitive Task Force; Special Agent	Miguel Gomez	2021–2022		Main		
FBI: Most Wanted	Kristin Gaines	FBI Fugitive Task Force; Special Agent	Alexa Davalos	2021–2023		Main		
FBI: Most Wanted	Remy Scott	FBI Fugitive Task Force; Supervisory Special Agent	Dylan McDermott	2022–2025	Guest	Main		
FBI: Most Wanted	Ray Cannon	FBI Fugitive Task Force; Special Agent	Edwin Hodge	2022–2025		Main		
FBI: Most Wanted	Nina Chase	FBI Fugitive Task Force; Special Agent	Shantel VanSanten	2022–2025 & 2026	Recurring	Main	Guest	
FBI: International	Scott Forrester	FBI International Fly Team; Supervisory Special Agent	Luke Kleintank	2021–2024	Guest		Main	
FBI: International	Jamie Kellett	FBI International Fly Team; Special Agent	Heida Reed	2021–2024	Guest		Main	
FBI: International	Andre Raines	FBI International Fly Team; Special Agent	Carter Redwood	2021–2025	Guest		Main	
FBI: International	Cameron Vo	FBI International Fly Team; Special Agent	Vinessa Vidotto	2021–2025	Guest		Main	
FBI: International	Katrin Jaeger	Europol Agent	Christiane Paul	2021–2022, 2023 & 2025			Main	
FBI: International	Megan "Smitty" Garretson	Europol Agent	Eva-Jane Willis	2022–2025			Main	
FBI: International	Amanda Tate	FBI International Fly Team; Supervisory Intelligence Analyst	Christina Wolfe	2024–2025			Main	
FBI: International	Wes Mitchell	FBI International Fly Team; Supervisory Special Agent	Jesse Lee Soffer	2024–2025			Main	
CIA
CIA	Colin Glass	CIA New York Station; Case Officer	Tom Ellis	2026–present				Main
CIA	Bill Goodman	FBI Special Agent	Nick Gehlfuss	2026–present				Main
CIA	Gina Gosian	CIA New York Station Intelligence Analyst	Natalee Linez	2026–present				Main
CIA	Nikki Reynard	CIA Deputy Chief of New York Station	Necar Zadegan	2026–present	Guest			Main

== Crossovers ==
Crossover between			Episode	Type	Actors crossing over	Date aired
Series A	Series B	Series C	Episode	Type	Actors crossing over	Date aired
FBI	FBI: Most Wanted	—N/a	"Most Wanted" (FBI 1.18)	Backdoor pilot	Appearing in Series A: Julian McMahon, Kellan Lutz, Roxy Sternberg, Keisha Castle-Hughes, Nathaniel Arcand, Alana de la Garza, YaYa Gosselin	April 2, 2019
Main article: Most Wanted (FBI)
FBI: Most Wanted	FBI	—N/a	"Dopesick" (FBI: Most Wanted 1.01)	Guest appearance	Appearing in Series A: Alana de la Garza	January 7, 2020
FBI: Most Wanted	FBI	—N/a	"Caesar" (FBI: Most Wanted 1.04)	Guest appearance	Appearing in Series A: Alana de la Garza	January 28, 2020
FBI	FBI: Most Wanted	—N/a	"American Dreams" (FBI 2.18) "Reveille" (FBI: Most Wanted 1.09)	Two-part crossover	Appearing in Series A: Julian McMahon, Kellan Lutz, Roxy Sternberg, Keisha Castle-Hughes, YaYa Gosselin Appearing in Series B: Zeeko Zaki, Ebonée Noel, John Boyd, Alana de la Garza, Jeremy Sisto	March 24, 2020
Main article: FBI and FBI: Most Wanted crossover
FBI	Chicago P.D.	—N/a	"Emotional Rescue" (FBI 2.19)	Guest appearance	Appearing in Series A: Tracy Spiridakos	March 31, 2020
Main article: Emotional Rescue (FBI)
FBI: Most Wanted	FBI	—N/a	"Deconflict" (FBI: Most Wanted 2.03)	Guest appearance	Appearing in Series A: Alana de la Garza	December 8, 2020
FBI: Most Wanted	FBI	—N/a	"Criminal Justice" (FBI: Most Wanted 2.12)	Guest appearance	Appearing in Series A: Alana de la Garza	May 4, 2021
FBI	FBI: Most Wanted	FBI: International	"All That Glitters" (FBI 4.01) "Exposed" (FBI: Most Wanted 3.01) "Pilot" (FBI: International 1.01)	Three-part crossover	Appearing in Series A: Julian McMahon, Kellan Lutz Appearing in Series B: Missy Peregrym, Zeeko Zaki, Alana de la Garza Appearing in Series C: Missy Peregrym, Zeeko Zaki, Alana de la Garza, Jeremy Sisto, Julian McMahon, Kellan Lutz, James Chen, Taylor Anthony Miller	September 21, 2021
FBI: International	FBI	—N/a	"The Edge" (FBI: International 1.02)	Guest appearance	Appearing in Series A: Jeremy Sisto	September 28, 2021
FBI: International	FBI	—N/a	"Secrets as Weapons" (FBI: International 1.03)	Guest appearance	Appearing in Series A: Alana de la Garza	October 5, 2021
FBI: International	FBI: Most Wanted	—N/a	"Trying to Grab Smoke" (FBI: International 1.07)	Guest appearance	Appearing in Series A: Julian McMahon	November 16, 2021
FBI: Most Wanted	FBI	—N/a	"Gladiator" (FBI: Most Wanted 3.07)	Guest appearance	Appearing in Series A: Alana de la Garza	November 16, 2021
FBI: International	FBI	—N/a	"Chew Toy" (FBI: International 1.11)	Guest appearance	Appearing in Series A: Jeremy Sisto	February 1, 2022
FBI: Most Wanted	FBI	—N/a	"Incel" (FBI: Most Wanted 3.15)	Guest appearance	Appearing in Series A: Alana de la Garza	March 22, 2022
FBI: Most Wanted	FBI	—N/a	"Decriminalized" (FBI: Most Wanted 3.16)	Guest appearance	Appearing in Series A: Alana de la Garza	March 29, 2022
FBI: Most Wanted	FBI	—N/a	"Crypto Wars" (FBI: Most Wanted 4.11)	Guest appearance	Appearing in Series A: Alana de la Garza	January 24, 2023
FBI: International	FBI	FBI: Most Wanted	"Imminent Threat - Part One" (FBI: International 2.16) "Imminent Threat - Part Two" (FBI 5.17) "Imminent Threat - Part Three" (FBI: Most Wanted 4.16)	Three-part crossover	Appearing in Series A: John Boyd, Shantel VanSanten, Alana de la Garza, Jeremy Sisto Appearing in Series B: Luke Kleintank, Heida Reed, Carter Redwood, Vinessa Vidotto, Roxy Sternberg, Keisha Castle-Hughes, Dylan McDermott Appearing in Series C: Missy Peregrym, Zeeko Zaki, John Boyd, Katherine Renee Kane, Luke Kleintank, Shantel VanSanten, Alana De La Garza, Jeremy Sisto	April 4, 2023
FBI: International	FBI	—N/a	"June" (FBI: International 3.01)	Guest appearance	Appearing in Series A: Jeremy Sisto	February 13, 2024
FBI: International	FBI	—N/a	"The Last Stop" (FBI: International 3.02)	Guest appearance	Appearing in Series A: Jeremy Sisto	February 20, 2024
FBI: International	FBI	—N/a	"Cowboy Behavior" (FBI: International 3.04)	Guest appearance	Appearing in Series A: Jeremy Sisto	March 12, 2024
FBI: International	FBI	—N/a	"Andiamo!" (FBI: International 3.07)	Guest appearance	Appearing in Series A: Jeremy Sisto	April 2, 2024
FBI: International	FBI	—N/a	"Remove the Compromise" (FBI: International 3.08)	Guest appearance	Appearing in Series A: Jeremy Sisto	April 9, 2024
FBI: Most Wanted	FBI	—N/a	"Supply Chain" (FBI: Most Wanted 5.08)	Guest appearance	Appearing in Series A: John Boyd	April 9, 2024
FBI	FBI: Most Wanted	—N/a	"Best Laid Plans" (FBI 6.09)	Guest appearance	Appearing in Series A: Shantel VanSanten	April 16, 2024
FBI: International	FBI	—N/a	"The Other Hard Part" (FBI: International 4.02)	Guest appearance	Appearing in Series A: Jeremy Sisto	October 22, 2024
FBI: Most Wanted	FBI	—N/a	"Varsity Blues" (FBI: Most Wanted 6.02)	Guest appearance	Appearing in Series A: Alana de la Garza	October 22, 2024
FBI: Most Wanted	FBI	—N/a	"White Buffalo" (FBI: Most Wanted 6.03)	Guest appearance	Appearing in Series A: John Boyd	October 29, 2024
FBI	FBI: Most Wanted	—N/a	"Descent" (FBI 7.09)	Guest appearance	Appearing in Series A: Shantel VanSanten	January 28, 2025
FBI	FBI: Most Wanted	—N/a	"Unearth" (FBI 7.13)	Guest appearance	Appearing in Series A: Shantel VanSanten	February 25, 2025
FBI: International	FBI	—N/a	"They May Get Their Wish" (FBI: International 4.15)	Guest appearance	Appearing in Series A: Jeremy Sisto	March 18, 2025
FBI: Most Wanted	FBI	—N/a	"Four Bodies" (FBI: Most Wanted 6.15)	Guest appearance	Appearing in Series A: John Boyd	March 18, 2025
FBI: Most Wanted	FBI	—N/a	"Gut Job" (FBI: Most Wanted 6.17)	Guest appearance	Appearing in Series A: Alana de la Garza	April 8, 2025
FBI: Most Wanted	FBI	—N/a	"Souls on ICE" (FBI: Most Wanted 6.21)	Guest appearance	Appearing in Series A: Alana de la Garza	May 13, 2025
FBI	FBI: Most Wanted	—N/a	"Confetti" (FBI 8.11)	Guest appearance	Appearing in Series A: Shantel VanSanten	February 23, 2026
CIA	FBI	—N/a	"Directed Energy" (CIA 1.01)	Guest appearance	Appearing in Series A: Jeremy Sisto & James Chen	February 23, 2026
CIA	FBI	—N/a	"Bridge of Lies" (CIA 1.03)	Guest appearance	Appearing in Series A: Jeremy Sisto	March 9, 2026
CIA	FBI	—N/a	"Deep Cover" (CIA 1.05)	Guest appearance	Appearing in Series A: James Chen	March 23, 2026
FBI	CIA	—N/a	"3 Up, 3 Down" (FBI 8.16)	Guest appearance	Appearing in Series A: Necar Zadegan	March 30, 2026
CIA	FBI	—N/a	"Pledge of Allegiance" (CIA 1.06)	Guest appearance	Appearing in Series A: Jeremy Sisto	March 30, 2026
CIA	FBI	—N/a	"Elimination Game" (CIA 1.07)	Guest appearance	Appearing in Series A: Missy Peregrym & Alana de la Garza	April 13, 2026
CIA	FBI	—N/a	"Blood Money" (CIA 1.09)	Guest appearance	Appearing in Series A: Jeremy Sisto	April 27, 2026
CIA	FBI	—N/a	"Rare Earth" (CIA 1.10)	Guest appearance	Appearing in Series A: Jeremy Sisto	May 4, 2026
CIA	FBI	—N/a	"Forbidden Eye" (CIA 1.11)	Guest appearance	Appearing in Series A: James Chen	May 11, 2026
CIA	FBI	—N/a	"Broken Glass" (CIA 1.12)	Guest appearance	Appearing in Series A: Jeremy Sisto	May 18, 2026
FBI	CIA	—N/a	"Rendition" (FBI 9.01)	Guest appearance	Appearing in Series A: Necar Zadegan	October 5, 2026
CIA	FBI	—N/a	"The Deep" (CIA 2.01)	Guest appearance	Appearing in Series A: John Boyd	October 5, 2026
