= FBI: Most Wanted season 1 =

Season of American television series

FBI: Most Wanted
- Season 1
- Starring: Julian McMahon; Kellan Lutz; Roxy Sternberg; Keisha Castle-Hughes; Nathaniel Arcand
- No. of episodes: 14

Release
- Original network: CBS
- Original release: January 7 – May 5, 2020

Season chronology
- Next → Season 2

The first season of the American crime drama television series FBI: Most Wanted premiered on CBS on January 7, 2020, as a mid-season replacement, and ended on May 5. Only 14 episodes were produced due to the COVID-19 pandemic in the United States. It is the first spin-off from Dick Wolf's drama FBI. The series and its characters were introduced during the first-season episode of FBI titled "Most Wanted".

FBI: Most Wanted starred Julian McMahon, Kellan Lutz, Roxy Sternberg, Keisha Castle-Hughes, and Nathaniel Arcand and follows the work of FBI's New York Fugitive Task Force, which relentlessly tracks and captures the notorious and dangerous criminals on the FBI's Most Wanted list.

The first season of FBI: Most Wanted ranked #17 with an average of 10.20 million viewers.

== Cast and characters ==
=== Main ===
- Julian McMahon as Jess LaCroix, FBI Supervisory Special Agent (SSA) and Team Leader of the Fugitive Task Force.
- Kellan Lutz as Kenny Crosby, FBI Special Agent in the Fugitive Task Force.
- Roxy Sternberg as Sheryll Barnes, FBI Special Agent and Second in Command of the Fugitive Task Force.
- Keisha Castle-Hughes as Hana Gibson, FBI Special Agent and Technical Analyst assigned to the Fugitive Task Force.
- Nathaniel Arcand as Clinton Skye, FBI Special Agent assigned to the Fugitive Task Force as well as Jess LaCroix's brother-in-law.

=== Recurring ===
- YaYa Gosselin as Tali LaCroix, daughter of Jess LaCroix and his wife, Angelyne and niece of Clinton Skye.
- Lorne Cardinal as Nelson Skye, father of Clinton Skye, father-in-law of Jess LaCroix and grandfather of Tali LaCroix.
- Irene Bedard as Marilou Skye, mother of Clinton Skye, mother-in-law of Jess LaCroix and grandmother of Tali LaCroix.

=== Guest stars ===
- Henry Thomas as Dr. Justin Brock, Foot and Ankle Specialist (in "Dopesick").

=== Crossover ===
- Zeeko Zaki as FBI Special Agent Omar Adom "OA" Zidan.
- Ebonée Noel as FBI Special Agent Kristen Chazal.
- John Boyd as FBI Special Agent Stuart Scola.
- Alana de la Garza as FBI Special Agent in Charge Isobel Castile.
- Jeremy Sisto as FBI Assistant Special Agent in Charge Jubal Valentine.

== Episodes ==
No. overall	No. in season	Title	Directed by	Written by	Original release date	Prod. code	U.S. viewers (millions)
1	1	"Dopesick"	Fred Berner	René Balcer	January 7, 2020	MW101	7.19
When Justin Brock fatally kills his wife after also shooting dead an intruder in his home with the 911 call recording everything that happened, he is placed on the Bureau's most wanted list and the FBI's Fugitive task force led by SSA Jess LaCroix is assigned to track him down. They learn that Brock gave multiple prescriptions provided by the Forsaken Sons biker gang, with whom he worked. An associate of his, upon being arrested, reveals that Brock operates another clinic in Pennsylvania under a different name. Brock transferred money to an account in Richmond, Virginia, which he plans to deposit from with the help of his estranged daughter. LaCroix and his team convince her to deposit the money herself to lure her father, after revealing to her that his military history was fake. Brock enters their trap and confronts his daughter, who outsmarts him and LaCroix talks her down from killing her father.: Henry Thomas (Justin Brock) is credited as a Special Guest Star.
2	2	"Defender"	Nicole Rubio	Richard Sweren	January 14, 2020	MW102	6.51
When her son is given a harsh sentence for a petty crime, single mother Denise Tyson goes on a deadly rampage at a Public Defender's office, taking justice into her own hands. Her rampage takes her across state lines and injuring the ones she blames for dissolving her perfect image of her family. The Fugitive Task Force face a delicate challenge when it is revealed that she also has a daughter that was in the foster care system before running away to Miami. LaCroix decides to use her anonymity of appearance to their advantage upon Denise's arrival in Baltimore by having a police recruit and Barnes pose as the daughter and foster mother. However, Denise sees through their ploy, but LaCroix manages to talk her into surrendering. On the personal front, LaCroix seeks to support his daughter coping with the loss of her mother.
3	3	"Hairtrigger"	Jim McKay	Story by : Gina Gionfriddo & Jerome Hairston; Teleplay by : Gina Gionfriddo	January 21, 2020	MW106	6.59
When young mass shooting survivor Doug Timmins radicalizes into becoming an anti-government terrorist and shoots a cop and a hit-and-run driver, the team works to track him down to prevent from exacting revenge against those he blames for his trauma. The Fugitive Task Force manages to stop his associate Max Kellerman, who shares his beliefs, and has his wife get audio samples they can use to trick Doug's stepsister about new targets. However, they quickly realize that she and Doug already planned to target the location in question, which is also where she works. As the evacuation gets underway, she sneaks away to help Doug prepare. The task force and SWAT team raid their location, causing Doug to threaten to kill himself. Both LaCroix and his stepsister try to talk him down with different aims, but LaCroix tackles him in a moment of hesitancy.
4	4	"Caesar"	Fred Berner	Kathy McCormick	January 28, 2020	MW105	6.11
Tyrone Jackson, leader of the Rolling Sixs gang, plans to gain more power and territory and seemingly steals robbery plans from a rival gang. The Fugitive Task Force deduces a meeting place he and Cleo Wilkens shared, only to find him dead inside the water tower. They're quick to deduce that Cleo was behind the murder and that she herself wants to continue his work. As she continues her quest for power, Barnes decides to go undercover, reassuming an identity she utilized five years ago to get in touch with an old associate that leads her to Cleo. She proves her loyalty and is soon tasked to aid Cleo and her crew in a robbery, utilising the same plans that she stole disguised as Tyrone. Once the FBI raids the location, she holds Barnes' associate hostage, but she and LaCroix talk her into surrendering. LaCroix grapples with how to explain to his daughter what her mother worked with in the name of protecting her loved ones.: Alana de la Garza (Isobel Castille) is credited as a Special Guest Star.
5	5	"Invisible"	Elodie Keene	Dwain Worrell	February 11, 2020	MW107	6.11
When military veteran Scot Weitzen snaps after the death of his brother-in-arms, the decorated sniper's expert abilities are put to use when he kills five people in a gun range and continues to lead the Fugitive Task Force on a cat-and-mouse hunt. The Task Force uncover mass drug addiction usages and other struggles by veterans in order to understand who Weitzen is and how he operates. The case becomes personal for Crosby with his veteran history, and he treads a delicate line after losing his temper. With the help of the same nurse that treated his brother-in-arms, the Fugitive Task Force try to talk Weitzen down, but he upholds his resistance. Gibson utilizes his phone in order to give Clinton acoustic assistance in order to take him out. LaCroix and his family unite to tend to his wife's grave.
6	6	"Prophet"	Rose Troche	Richard Sweren	February 18, 2020	MW108	6.29
Quinten Garvey, a former con man turned cult leader, orders the death of his family when he has a "dream". Unknown to him, his wife escapes with their infant. The Fugitive Task Force tracks Garvey and his most trusted as they utilize burner phones, and corners them at his second property, Rising Sun. However, he escapes with the young girls brought along. Things escalate when his group takes a teenage girl with them, who later escapes. The Task Force learns that his paintings belonged to his former cell mate, who they trick into being released early to confirm their contact. Everything comes full circle and leads to a last stand in Clayton, Georgia where Garvey demands free passage, but allows LaCroix to check on the girls. He confronts him with his con past and convinces the two remaining girls to turn against him. LaCroix manages to secure the last girl and shoot Garvey. LaCroix attempt to get his daughter back into orienteering, but after failing, turns to Clinton for a solution. The next time he tries, Tali accepts his offer.
7	7	"Ghosts"	Jean de Segonzac	Story by : Gina Gionfriddo & Jerome Hairston; Teleplay by : Gina Gionfriddo	March 10, 2020	MW109	5.99
After the disappearance of his daughter is ignored by local PD, Reginald Waters, a Native American man decides to take matters into his own hands and the Task Force must track him down before his crusade claims lives. Waters' crusade crosses multiple state lines, pursuing a possible sex trafficking ring his daughter was forced into. In Maryland, he kidnaps a sex worker who tells him that his daughter was killed by a john. The Task Force learns that the pimp was later killed, and that Waters turns back to his father to stop the cycle of abuse his family endured. He takes his younger brother to his father's former reservation school outside Ontario, Canada, where they conduct a ritual to lift the curse. When surrounded, Clinton talks Waters into surrendering. His daughter's remains are later found and identified and given a proper burial.: Martin Sensmeier (Reginald Waters) is credited as a Special Guest Star.
8	8	"Predators"	Fred Berner	Elizabeth Rinehart	March 17, 2020	MW110	6.44
The Fugitive Task Force desperately hunt for Ronnie Lee Bishop and his girlfriend Raylynn Parker, a young couple who rapes and murders young women across multiple states. As they learn more about Bishop, they figure out that his targeted locations where the same ones where his prostitute mother was arrested when he was younger. Bishop also goes out of his way to target older men with the younger women, including someone who once was his mother's boyfriend until he kicked them out. The Task Forces secures Raylynn after she is used as bait for another victim, who he keeps hostage along with his mother's ex boyfriend. In one last ditch effort, the Task Force allows him to see his girlfriend, which tips him over the edge for a final stand-off, claiming his life, much to Raylynn's devastation. LaCroix worries that he's missing out on Tali's achievements when she gets an arts reward, and later decides to learn how she pieced her art together.
9	9	"Reveille"	Fred Berner	Ryan Causey	March 24, 2020	MW114	9.49
After taking down a terrorist who was responsible for kidnapping 26 children, the Fugitive Task Force and Special Agent OA Zidan from the New York field office as well as OA's colleagues in the New York office search for the terrorist's wife, who is determined to follow through with her husband's deadly plan while Jess attempts to find Tali who was taken by Immigration and Customs Enforcement officers when the local food bank she volunteers at was raided. This episode concludes a crossover event that begins on FBI season 2 episode 18. Zeeko Zaki (Omar Adom "OA" Zidan), Ebonee Noel (Kristen Chazal), John Boyd (Stuart Scola), Alana de la Garza (Isobel Castille) and Jeremy Sisto (Jubal Valentine) are all credited as Special Guest Stars.
10	10	"Silkworm"	Ken Girotti	Dwain Worrell	March 31, 2020	MW113	8.10
After former FBI counterintelligence agent Paul Hayden is caught leaking classified information to the Chinese government and attacks his former partners, leaving one dead from cyanide poisoning and the other in a coma, the Fugitive Task Force must track him down before he escapes the country for good. A Chinese asset working in a church points then to someone going by the name "Silkworm", who they through undercover work learn is Hayden's mistress, with whom he has a son. Hayden asks his Chinese handlers to escort her and their son, but the task force stop them to use her and the son as leverage against Hayden before he can leave the country. Despite the revelation that she is transgender, Hayden decides to remain in the US. LaCroix has his reservations about Tali publishing a dancing video from the Georgia immigration camp to social media, but ultimately decides to respect her wishes.
11	11	"Ironbound"	Alex Chapple	Elizabeth Rinehart	April 14, 2020	MW103	8.95
After Morristown police officer Gabriel Clark claims he's the victim of a deep-rooted conspiracy and begins taking revenge on those he believes are responsible for his downfall, Jess and the team learn that he might be right. They learn that his recollection from a drug raid during his tenure with the Newark PD was contradicted by his colleagues and superiors. Further information added notes that the police raided the wrong house, with all the collective information and ongoing rampage leading to an internal investigation. Clark however still refuses to surrender, and LaCroix and his team turn to his former mentor, hoping he can get through to him. After releasing a falsified email to lure Clark, they drive him to a rendezvous point where both LaCroix and the mentor attempt to talk him down. Clark enters the house and sets himself ablaze, but LaCroix stamps out the fire and saves him. On the personal front, he decides to ground Tali after her grandmother gets worried after she looked for a hawk. LaCroix later changes his mind and vows with Tali to model their decision-making after her mother.
12	12	"Ride or Die"	John David Cole	Story by : Jerome Hairston & Gina Gionfriddo; Teleplay by : Jerome Hairston	April 14, 2020	MW104	7.16
After manipulative student Connie Romano commits murder in a fit of jealousy, the team races to capture her and her accomplice Amber Matos before she escapes across the Mexican border and out of their jurisdiction. Through everything LaCroix and his team learn about Romano, it becomes obvious she is psychopathic and is manipulating Amber into believing her plans for a better life for her. They also learn that Romano's ex fed into her ego by showing some remaining affection despite their split. Once they capture Matos in Georgia, she claims responsibility for Connie's crimes. During interrogation, they feed into Connie's ego with her lust for her father who abandoned her as a child, which gradually leads to her confession. LaCroix also teaches Tali to stand up to bullies, and is impressed when she handles an issue without his advice.
13	13	"Grudge"	Leslie Libman	Kathy McCormick	April 28, 2020	MW112	6.96
The Fugitive Task Force searches for an unknown subject who is a cyberstalker who recently attempted to kidnap market staffer Chris Thompson. They find the van the stalker utilized and it being filled with torture equipment. The common theme for both the man who sold the stalker the van and the one who made the equipment, was that they both were blackmailed by him. The stalker is identified as David Fallon, who targets anyone he believes wronged him, also having a history of stalking tracing back to when he was eight. Thompson takes matters into his own hands, seeking to put an end to Fallon's reign of terror himself, but ends up captured. The Task Force arrive in New Jersey, to a neighborhood Fallon chose to recreate the scene of his father's humiliation by their neighbor. LaCroix talks him down, forcing him to accept that his father suffered from depression and had committed suicide. During the case, Hana receives texts from a former date willing to share relevant information on Fallon, but eventually deduces that he used as a ruse to get back together with her. Once Fallon is arrested, Hana puts her former date in his place and severes ties once and for all.
14	14	"Getaway"	Ken Girotti	Story by : Jerome Hairston & Gina Gionfriddo; Teleplay by : Jerome Hairston	May 5, 2020	MW111	6.62
Father and son duo Blake and Steve Wilson escape from a prison transport van on their way to their trial, father and son unite with Blake's prison pen pal Jeri Earls to plan their next robbery to secure passports to leave for Canada. As they go, the Fugitive Task Force sees a pattern of erratic murders in their wake, which they narrow down to being Steve's doing. Once they manage to trap Jeri, they find passports in her home for only her and Blake, implying they want to get rid of Steve. LaCroix decides to use this to their advantage when the Wilsons strike a bank in Hartford, Connecticut, causing Steve to shoot his father, feeling betrayed, while LaCroix talks him into surrendering. On the personal front, Tali and Clinton convince him to re-enter the dating scene after he strikes up conversation with a woman at their local coffee shop.

== Production ==
On January 29, 2019, it was announced that CBS had commissioned a backdoor pilot with an attached series commitment for a potential spin-off series titled FBI: Most Wanted with the episode to air in the latter part of the first season. The series will focus on the division of the FBI tasked with tracking and capturing the most notorious criminals on the FBI's Most Wanted list. According to Dick Wolf, the spin-off is set to launch a series of interconnected shows similar to that both of Wolf's Chicago and Law & Order franchises on NBC. On May 9, 2019, CBS announced that FBI: Most Wanted had been ordered to series. A few days later, it was announced that the series would premiere as a mid-season replacement in the winter-spring of 2020. The series premiered on January 7, 2020. On March 13, 2020, it was announced that Universal Television has suspended the production due to the impact of the COVID-19 pandemic on television in the United States. They were filming episode 15, directed by Lexi Alexander.

== Ratings ==
The series premiere episode "Dopesick" drew approximately 7.19 million viewers and a 0.8/4 ratings share among adults 18–49. DVR viewership was 3.36 million, totaling 10.55 million. This made one the best debuts for the 2019–20 television season. However, the DVR ratings were down from the sixth season premiere of NCIS: New Orleans which occupied the same timeslot for its first ten episodes. The crossover event with flagship series FBI earned 9.49 million viewers, while earning 3.45 million DVR viewers, resulting in a total of 12.94 million. The season finale, "Getaway", was watched by 6.62 million people. For its first season, FBI: Most Wanted was the 17th most-watched new series in total viewership, averaging 10.20 million viewers. It was also the 39th most-seen show in the 18–49 demographic, with a 1.2 rating.

Viewership and ratings per episode of FBI: Most Wanted season 1
No.	Title	Air date	Rating/share (18–49)	Viewers (millions)	DVR (18–49)	DVR viewers (millions)	Total (18–49)	Total viewers (millions)
1	"Dopesick"	January 7, 2020	0.8/4	7.19	0.5	3.36	1.3	10.55
2	"Defender"	January 14, 2020	0.8/4	6.51	0.5	3.52	1.2	10.04
3	"Hairtrigger"	January 21, 2020	0.7/4	6.59	0.5	3.47	1.2	10.07
4	"Caesar"	January 28, 2020	0.7/4	6.11	0.4	3.24	1.1	9.35
5	"Invisible"	February 11, 2020	0.6	6.11	0.5	3.16	1.1	9.27
6	"Prophet"	February 18, 2020	0.7	6.29	0.5	3.20	1.2	9.50
7	"Ghosts"	March 10, 2020	0.6	5.99	0.4	3.26	1.0	9.26
8	"Predators"	March 17, 2020	0.8	6.44	0.4	3.19	1.2	9.64
9	"Reveille"	March 24, 2020	1.0	9.49	0.5	3.45	1.5	12.94
10	"Silkworm"	March 31, 2020	0.9	8.10	0.5	3.36	1.4	11.46
11	"Ironbound"	April 14, 2020	0.9	8.95	0.4	2.72	1.3	11.67
12	"Ride or Die"	April 14, 2020	0.7	7.16	0.5	3.20	1.2	10.36
13	"Grudge"	April 28, 2020	0.7	6.96	0.5	3.22	1.2	10.18
14	"Getaway"	May 5, 2020	0.6	6.62	0.5	3.35	1.1	9.97
