= FBI and FBI: Most Wanted crossover =

March 24, 2020, television event

- FBI and FBI: Most Wanted crossover event
- Original air date: March 24, 2020

Part 1: FBI
- Episode title: "American Dreams"
- Episode no.: Season 2 Episode 18
- Directed by: Terry Miller
- Written by: David Amann
- Production code: FBI218

Episode chronology
| ← Previous "Broken Promises" | Next → "Emotional Rescue" |

Part 2: FBI: Most Wanted
- Episode title: "Reveille"
- Episode no.: Season 1 Episode 9
- Directed by: Fred Berner
- Written by: Ryan Causey
- Production code: MW114

Episode chronology
| ← Previous "Predators" | Next → "Silkworm" |

Crossover chronology
- Preceded by: Most Wanted

The FBI and FBI: Most Wanted crossover is a two-part crossover event between FBI and FBI: Most Wanted that aired on CBS on March 24, 2020. The first part, "American Dreams", which is the eighteenth episode of the second season of FBI and the 40th episode overall, was written by David Amann and directed by Terry Miller, while the second part, "Reveille", which is the ninth episode of the first season of FBI: Most Wanted, was written by Ryan Causey and directed by Fred Berner. Julian McMahon, Keisha Castle-Hughes, Kellan Lutz, Roxy Sternberg, Zeeko Zaki, Ebonée Noel, John Boyd, Alana de la Garza, and Jeremy Sisto appeared in both parts of the event as Jess LaCroix, Hana Gibson, Ken Crosby, Sheryll Barnes, Omar Adom "O. A." Agent Zidan, Kristen Chazal, Stuart Scola, Isobel Castille, Jubal Valentine, respectively.

== Cast and characters ==
=== Main ===
The following contains a list of actors receiving main billing in the crossover event:

| Actor | Character | Episode | |
| Actor | Character | FBI | FBI: Most Wanted |
|---|---|---|---|
| Missy Peregrym | Special Agent Maggie Bell | Main (Note: Despite being credited Missy Peregrym did not appear in the episode) | |
| Zeeko Zaki | Special Agent OA Zidan | Main | Guest |
| Ebonée Noel | Special Agent Kristen Chazal | Main | Guest |
| Jeremy Sisto | Assistant Special Agent In Charge Jubal Valentine | Main | Guest |
| Alana De La Garza | Special Agent In Charge Isobel Castille | Main | Guest |
| John Boyd | Special Agent Stuart Scola | Main | Guest |
| Julian McMahon | Supervisory Special Agent Jess LaCroix | Guest | Main |
| Kellan Lutz | Special Agent Kenny Crosby | Guest | Main |
| Roxy Sternberg | Special Agent Sheryll Barnes | Guest | Main |
| Keisha Castle-Hughes | Special Agent/Intelligence Analyst Hana Gibson | Guest | Main |
| Nathaniel Arcand | Special Agent Clinton Skye | | Main |

=== Guests ===
The following contains a list of notable guests appearing in the crossover event:

| Actor | Character | Episode | |
| Actor | Character | FBI | FBI: Most Wanted |
|---|---|---|---|
| Catherine Haena Kim | Emily Ryder | Guest | |
| Taylor Anthony Miller | Kelly Moran | Guest | |
| YaYa Gosselin | Tali LaCroix | Guest | Guest |
| Roshawn Franklin | Agent Hobbs | Guest | |
| Airon Armstrong | Sam Givens/Masked Man #2/Tall Man | Guest | |
| Steven Boyer | Tyler Kane/Masked Man/Masked Kane | Guest | Guest |
| Samantha Soule | Emma Kane | Guest | Guest |
| Anna Khaja | Yara Mahmoud | Guest | Guest |
| Lorne Cardinal | Nelson Skye | | Guest |

== Plot ==
=== Part 1: FBI Season 2 Episode 18 "American Dreams" ===
A school bus with 26 elementary students is hijacked, sending the FBI into a desperate race against time to find them. With Maggie away on her undercover mission (leaving OA without a partner), Jess LaCroix of the FBI Fugitive Task Force and his team (Sheryl Barnes, Hana Gibson, and Kenny Crosby) later join OA, Castille, and the New York team (Emily Ryder, Stuart Scola (whom Barnes actually recognizes), and Jubal Valentine), the two teams meeting each other for the first time as it's revealed that one of the suspects behind the kidnapping is Sam Givens, a man Jess had previously arrested.

After a series of dead ends and even finding Givens dead in the back of a truck, they eventually determine that the kids are being held at an Amusement Park, which Jubal identifies as "Play Town" due to one of the children, Owen Jamison, mentioning its initials ("PT") via sign language (a talent that he uses since his sister is deaf), which he used to communicate during a video message and that the man responsible for the abduction is Tyler Kane, a violent white supremacist, who has yet to be arrested due to his crimes not being "serious enough". The message in question shows Kane demanding a ransom of $1,000,000 in $100 bills (which could buy a major terror attack, with a little left over to fund his white supremacist movement), or all 26 kids will die. However, things get complicated for the team after Kane sends another message, having learned about the FBI's involvement, and demanding for an agent to be the one to drop off the money with no backup in half an hour. OA and Crosby are sent to drop the $1,000,000 in an alleyway, while receiving a call from Kane (who is naturally disappointed at the fact that OA (an Arab descendant and practicing Muslim) is working for the FBI). Things go wrong when a State Police helicopter makes its presence known, prompting Kane to violently threaten slitting a hostage's throat, forcing OA to reveal it, leading to Kane calling off the deal. It is later revealed that the helicopter had to lower itself due to air traffic. A disappointed Castille reminds a visiting State Police officer that it killed the deal, along with their best hope of finding the kids, though OA believes that the ransom was just for show; Kane knew that he wouldn't be able to escape with the ransom money and needed an excuse to get away from the authorities like he has done in the past.

Fortunately, after locating Play Town, which is being by Kane and some of his fellow white supremacists (one of which is a relative of the park's owner) as a base of operations due to it being closed for the season, they apprehend Kane, who's left wounded after OA shoots him, and find the kids, with backup bringing them to safety. However, they discover that only 25 kids are present and Owen has gone missing, prompting Jess and OA to investigate. They head to the Jamison house and discover that Owen's father paid the ransom to two of the terrorists out of desperation and got his son back, as Kane had learned that Owen had a rich family and contacted his parents through the father's brother to cut a side deal, which is how Kane knew about the FBI's involvement and made the earlier false ransom to throw them offtrack. OA, while understanding the parents' need for getting their son back, reminds them about the other 25 children and that they need to rely on law enforcement more often.

As Jess and OA leave the house, having finished their interview, OA grimly remarks that this isn't over, due to Kane mentioning something earlier about the FBI being "too late" to stop something big that he had planned and that other members of his group now have the $1,000,000. Jess then receives a video message from his young daughter, Tali, informing him that the food bank she volunteers at is being raided by a group of ICE agents before her phone is taken away by one of them with OA telling Jess, "Let's go".

=== Part 2: FBI Most Wanted Season 1 Episode 9 "Reveille" ===
As Jess works to get his daughter, Tali, who's been taken on suspicion of being an illegal immigrant due to her skin color, back from ICE, even though he faces resistance from the ICE Supervisor Austin Stevens, he, his team of the FBI Fugitive Task Force, and the New York FBI field office continue searching for Emma Kane, the wife of Tyler Kane, after she escaped in "American Dreams" with $1,000,000 in ransom money, having made a deal with Roger Jamison, the father of Owen, whom Tyler had kidnapped in that episode, along with 25 other kids. However, she makes her presence known once more by infiltrating a church in Saugerties and killing twelve illegal immigrant women and injuring thirteen others (some of which were pregnant), prompting the CID to place her on the Most Wanted List. She also posts a video to YouTube, believing that her husband is dead after being shot by OA while urging the white people to wake up and rise, hoping to trigger a race war. Barnes, Jess, and OA visit Tyler at the hospital and try to get him to tell them of Emma's whereabouts, but Tyler refuses, informing the three agents that he and his group are stopping the white genocide and that the day of reckoning for every minority in the country is coming, adding that Emma "just blew freakin' Reveille". They then later discover that the scheme involves a bomb made from a controller and a receiver from a remote control toy car.

Meanwhile, Jess continues searching for Tali, but finds himself getting nowhere, as ICE agents and Border Patrol officers consistently transfer her from one detention center to another. It is later revealed by ICE Agent Zoe Cortina that Stevens was in on Tali's capture, turning the search into a kidnapping case. The team later discovers that their search for Emma and Jess's search for Tali are actually connected, as he receives an anonymous message on his phone, revealing Emma has ICE agents and Border Patrol officers that are also in on the Kanes's white supremacist movement and they all kidnapped Tali, asking him to read out the manifesto of the Kanes' white supremacist group, or Tali, now in the ICE System, will be deported to South America and possibly "getting jumped in by MS13". Jess holds the press conference, but emotionally goes off-script, refusing to read the message and revealing why he's doing it, something that OA and Jubal Valentine later thank him for, with Jubal saying Jess did it "without the PC niceties".

Jess then figures out that Emma wanted babies of her own to "contribute to a whiter America", but gave up due to the pills they were using were not working (one of which having expired a year ago). OA and Jubal then arrive in, telling Jess and Barnes that the Kanes have been traveling up and down the country for the last while, their phones having pinned them at numerous locations including Boston and Buffalo. Scola and Hana later arrive into the conference room, revealing that they've uncovered a website that Stevens spends an hour on every day called Ten-Fifteen.com (named after the Border Patrol code for "Alien in custody"), a very far-right website that can only be accessed by invitation and has jokes and memes about illegal immigrants (some of which are aimed at children). Heading back into the main room, Jubal informs the agents and analysts of the website while also expressing his anger and disgust at it, believing the bad apples posting on the site are bringing shame on every single federal employee before he orders the room to dig into the website. He then has Scola collect the name and pass them to the IG's office and Homeland Security. During one search, Kristen Chazal finds a photo showing Stevens and another ICE colleague of his, Michael Rees, fishing in Lake Seminole, while using the white power sign. Hana then reveals that Rees owns a detention center in Georgia, which could be where Tali is held. Jess and his brother-in-law, FBI Special Agent Clinton Skye, travel to the facility and after arresting Rees (and later Stevens), Jess is reunited with Tali, who is taken back to her grandparents, though she is also worried for her new friends in the facility.

Meanwhile, Barnes, Hana, and Crosby confront Joseph Carter, one of Emma's associates and engage in a gunfight that ends with the three agents shooting Carter. Searching the trunk, they discover copper wires and a man's dead body, with Hana identifying him as Jack Kendal, a missing janitor with access and keys to 30 properties. Doubling back, the team dig into the victim's past and learn that he did community service in Ulster County, with OA realizing that the Kanes' group is targeting the citizenship ceremony where his aunt, Yara Mahmoud, along with many others, will be sworn in as American citizens. Racing to the recreational center where the ceremony's taking place, OA is frustrated at the building's lack of cell service preventing him from contacting Yara, while he and Jess believe that after OA shot Kane, the group did the same thing they did to Jess in revenge for Sam Givens: They hacked into his life. The team later arrive at the building and split up into separate groups: Posing as a couple on a jog, Hana and Crosby go searching for Emma's accomplices, Robbins and Ling; Jess searches for Emma herself; OA discreetly escorts the people out of the building, including his aunt, under the pretence of offering photographs outside the building; and Barnes and a team of FBI agents search for the bomb. Eventually, Hana and Crosby arrest Emma's two accomplices, while OA finds his aunt, but struggles to help her to safety as she wants to stay inside and wait for the ceremony to begin, and the remaining team finds the bomb inside a cooler down in a locker room, Barnes grimly informing Jess they're going to disarm it as there's enough explosives to bring down the entire building. Jess confronts Emma in a park and tries to get her to surrender, but when it becomes obvious Emma is absolute on going through with the attack in an attempt to prove her worth to Tyler, vowing that she'll show him after learning he cheated on her by getting another woman pregnant, Jess steps back, allowing Clinton, who had been manning a sniper rifle, to fatally shoot Emma in the head, killing her and allowing Jess to seize control of the remote she planned on using to set off the bomb, preventing the explosion from occurring.

With Barnes's team having disarmed the bomb and all the main suspects either dead or in custody, the case has been solved, and the team is relieved that it has all come to an end. A while later, in another new location, possibly a courthouse, OA watches as his aunt is sworn as an American citizen with Jess and Tali, OA having invited the two of them to join him.

== Production ==
The shows were previously set in the same universe with the backdoor pilot for FBI: Most Wanted which aired as part of FBI. The backdoor pilot was titled "Most Wanted", and aired on April 2, 2019.

=== Release ===
The crossover was originally set to air a week earlier on March 17, 2020, but ended up being pushed back a week.

== Reception ==
=== Critical response ===
Brittany Frederick with One Chicago Center said "the episodes were perfectly structured, in that one story was pretty much tied up at the end of hour one (great for syndication), but there was enough story left to go on that it felt natural to extend it into another hour" and "they did a good job of getting at least one big scene for every series regular involved in the event."

=== Ratings ===
In the United States, the first part of the crossover was watched live by 10.67 million viewers, and 14.57 million within seven days. The second part was watched live by 9.49 million viewers, and 12.95 million within seven days. Both parts were the most watched episode of their respective series.
