= FBI season 1 =

Season of American television series

FBI
- Season 1
- Starring: Missy Peregrym; Zeeko Zaki; Jeremy Sisto; Ebonée Noel; Connie Nielsen; Sela Ward
- No. of episodes: 22

Release
- Original network: CBS
- Original release: September 25, 2018 – May 14, 2019

Season chronology
- Next → Season 2

The first season of the American crime drama FBI premiered on CBS on September 25, 2018, and ended on May 14, 2019 with 22 episodes. The season is produced by CBS Television Studios and Universal FBI Television.

The series stars Missy Peregrym, Zeeko Zaki, Jeremy Sisto, Ebonée Noel, and Sela Ward and centers on inner workings of the New York office criminal division of the Federal Bureau of Investigation (FBI). The episode "Most Wanted" served as the backdoor pilot of a spin-off titled FBI: Most Wanted.

The first season of FBI ranked as the 11th most watched new series with a total of 12.37 million viewers.

== Cast and characters ==
=== Main ===
- Missy Peregrym as Maggie Bell, FBI Special Agent (SA). She is the de facto agent in charge of the team while out in the field.
- Zeeko Zaki as Omar Adom "OA" Zidan, FBI Special Agent (SA) and Maggie's partner, West Point graduate, and a retired Army Ranger
- Jeremy Sisto as Jubal Valentine, FBI Assistant Special Agent-in-Charge (ASAC), who runs the office's fusion center.
- Ebonée Noel as Kristen Chazal, FBI Special Agent (SA) and an Intelligence Analyst (IA).
- Sela Ward as Special Agent-in-Charge (SAC) Dana Mosier, Solberg's replacement as the team's supervisor.
- Connie Nielsen as Special Agent-in-Charge (SAC) Ellen Solberg ("Pilot"), the team's initial supervisor.

=== Recurring ===
- Derek Hedlund as Special Agent JT, an FBI Special Agent (SA) who frequently worked in the field with OA and Maggie.
- James Chen as Ian Lim, an FBI Technical Analyst (TA).
- Thomas Phillip O'Neil as Dr. Neil Mosbach, an FBI Forensic Pathologist.
- Rodney Richardson as Ray Stapleton, an FBI Evidence Response Team (ERT) Forensic Technician.
- Nina Lisandrello as Eve Nettles, an FBI Evidence Response Team (ERT) Forensic Technician.

=== Guest stars ===
- Julian McMahon as Jess LaCroix, FBI Supervisory Special Agent (SSA) and Team Leader of the Fugitive Task Force (FTF). Has a history with FBI Assistant Special Agent-in-Charge (ASAC) Jubal Valentine, the two having previously worked together.
- Kellan Lutz as Kenny Crosby, FBI Special Agent (SA) in the Fugitive Task Force (FTF).
- Roxy Sternberg as Sheryll Barnes, FBI Special Agent (SA) and Second in Command of the Fugitive Task Force (FTF).
- Keisha Castle-Hughes as Hana Gibson, FBI Special Agent (SA) and Technical Analyst (TA) assigned to the Fugitive Task Force (FTF).
- Nathaniel Arcand as Clinton Skye, FBI Special Agent (SA) assigned to the Fugitive Task Force as well as Jess LaCroix's brother-in-law and the uncle of Tali, Jess's daughter.
- YaYa Gosselin as Tali Skye LaCroix, the daughter of Jess LaCroix.
- Alana de la Garza as Special Agent-in-Charge (SAC) Isobel Castille.

== Episodes ==
No. overall	No. in season	Title	Directed by	Written by	Original release date	Prod. code	U.S. viewers (millions)
1	1	"Pilot"	Niels Arden Oplev	Teleplay by : Craig Turk; Story by : Dick Wolf & Craig Turk	September 25, 2018	FBI101	10.09
When an apartment building is destroyed by two bomb blasts, killing 27 people including a young African-American boy, Emmett Grant leaving his mother, Keisha and older brother, Chris as survivors, it first appears to be part of a gang war. However, further investigation reveals that the mastermind behind the carnage is a white supremacist named Robert Lawrence who wants to create the illusion that groups or gangs of non-white people are turning the city of New York into a war zone. The FBI is closing in on Lawrence, but there's one more bomb somewhere, about to go off, sending field agents Maggie Bell and Omar Adom "OA" Zidan into a frantic race against time to stop the final attack before it happens with assistance from their boss, Special Agent in Charge Ellen Solberg, her second-in-command Assistant Special Agent in Charge Jubal Valentine, technical analyst Kristen Chazal and their colleagues in the Joint Operations Command or JOC at 26 Fed. Eventually, Maggie and OA corner Lawrence, arresting him at a TV station as Kristen defuses the last bomb at a town hall meeting as Solberg departs the team to begin investigating a kidnapping in The Battery (Manhattan), formerly Battery Park and Maggie attends Emmett Grant's funeral.: This episode marks the first and only appearance of Connie Nielsen (Ellen Solberg).
2	2	"Green Birds"	Nick Gomez	Aaron Fullerton	October 2, 2018	FBI104	9.37
Several people in New York collapse and die after buying food from a take-away. As Maggie, OA and the rest of the FBI's New York field office meet their new boss, Special Agent in Charge Dana Mosier who's a former profiler with the BAU, they quickly locate the store and find CCTV footage showing a young girl, sixteen year old Caroline Subotic spraying poison onto the food. They track her using CCTV cameras, revealing she dumped the dispenser and her clothes. She also collapses, landing in hospital while eventually dying from the same poison that she unknowingly injected into herself via a dispenser that has a needle that appears on the fifth press, injecting the user with poison that soon kills them. The team finds that she has been attracted to a radical form of Islam and duped into undertaking the terrorist attack, OA also learning terrorist Khalid Barhom whose crimes he saw during his time as an Army Ranger in Afghanistan is responsible. Having apprehended two of his accomplices with the help of Tara Shalgos, Maggie and OA track Barhom down to a pier where Barhom takes a woman hostage, OA saving her by shooting Barhom in the head. With Barhom now dead, his identity is erased from the web, becoming an actual ghost while Maggie sends Tara an email, promising to be there to listen if she ever needs to talk.: This episode marks the debut appearance of Sela Ward (Dana Mosier), Ward also receiving the "And" credit while Jeremy Sisto (Jubal Valentine) retains the "With", a credit he also received during the Pilot episode.
3	3	"Prey"	Norberto Barba	Andrew Wilder	October 9, 2018	FBI105	9.17
A family argument between Douglas Jacoby and his daughter, Emma is interrupted when a young woman, Hailey Nuriyev staggers onto the property, stabbed multiple times. The team finds that she had been buried barely alive and dug herself out of her grave with the discovery of many other graves that contains the bodies of other young women located in Sands Point, New York. The investigation finds that the woman in question is an American citizen born in Ukraine who, along with her sister was tricked into moving to the United States by a human trafficking group and when more bodies turn up with Jubal even going undercover due to his past experiences of working in Vice, Maggie and OA race against time to find, identity and arrest the masterminds, Maggie vowing to fulfil her promise to find Hailey's sister, Brooke. The team soon arrive at the beach house and successfully arrest the men while rescuing the young women, Maggie reuniting Haily and Brooke.
4	4	"Crossfire"	Arthur W. Forney	Brian Anthony	October 16, 2018	FBI102	9.31
Three people, including an assistant US attorney, Roland Poe, are shot by a sniper on Park Avenue. Due to Poe being an US attorney, Maggie and OA investigate. They interview his wife because he was meeting a divorce lawyer. Later, six people in a residential neighborhood on Staten Island are killed by the same man. The FBI agents identify the sniper as Cole Cooper, an army veteran who'd lost everything in his life including his faith in God after his girlfriend, Emily Wagner died from cancer. Maggie and OA soon find Cooper on top of a church in Queens, Maggie attempting to negotitate with Cooper but when Cooper aims for a civilian, Maggie orders him to be shot dead by a FBI sniper.
5	5	"Doomsday"	Fred Berner	Judith McCreary	October 23, 2018	FBI106	8.82
After a drill at a nuclear power plant, a real alarm goes off, warning that the reactor's coolant water is leaking and an employee, Cameron Porter is found dead. The team first suspect the murdered employee tried to sabotage the plant, but she did not have the expertise needed to attempt it, meaning she had a partner who is still on the loose. It's also revealed that Porter had a husband, Jake Fletcher who's on the FBI Most Wanted list for whistleblowing, leaking highly classified documents. The team soon ID a possible suspect, Garrett Sebastian who triggers an alert as Maggie and OA bring Sebastian back to 26 Fed, learning Sebastian has died from radiation poisoning via his flask and discover that the plant manager, Todd Winters they interviewed earlier is the real killer, Maggie and OA using Fletcher to bring him down. With the case solved, Fletcher is placed into protective custody.
6	6	"Family Man"	Jean de Segonzac	Barbie Kligman	October 30, 2018	FBI103	9.41
When US senator Gary Lynch's daughter Gracie, is kidnapped and held for ransom, the FBI dig into the senator's past to find out who is behind it. They discover that Lynch once had an affair with Nicole Sousa, with whom he also had a son, Nathan. Sousa also suffers from ALS which OA recognizes via a drop foot, commenting his grandfather had the same symptoms, and insists she needs Lynch's assistance. Returning to the apartment later, Maggie and OA find Sousa dead, having overdosed and manage to save Nathan from overdosing too. The kidnapping also reaches the press, which puts a strain on the possibility of getting Gracie back. It's soon revealed that the abducter is Joseph Finnegan who kidnapped Gracie in revenge for his son, Sean dying in prison ten days previously although it's mentioned Sean took his own life. With Gracie rescued and reunited with her parents, Alexis, Lynch's wife wants to adopt Nathan, Maggie confirming she can.
7	7	"Cops and Robbers"	Jean de Segonzac	Hadi Nicholas Deeb	November 13, 2018	FBI108	9.19
Criminals masquerading as police officers rob an armored car and steal two million dollars, with FBI suspecting it was an inside job. They manage to identify the members of the robbery crew, but their prime suspect Nick Salerno ends up dead, having been shot in the chest before they can apprehend him, OA arresting Jason Morgan, the mastermind while Maggie also tries to help OA be more open about his experiences during the war in Iraq.
8	8	"This Land Is Your Land"	Charlotte Brandstrom	Claire Demorest	November 20, 2018	FBI109	8.91
The FBI is called in when Victor Beniov, a Russian chemist who used to create chemical weapons and recently published a tell-all book, is kidnapped at a book signing. The trail of the illegally purchased weapons leads to two local brothers related to the far-right militia movement with the FBI descending on the area. Davis and Freddy Kernick later shoot at the team, escaping. OA saves Beniov who tells him and Jubal that they forced him to make hydrogen cyanide by threatening his daughter, who Beniov reveals they also had pictures of, sending Maggie and OA into downtown New York where they learn Davis has taken a courtroom hostage, attempting to get his father who was arrested released despite Mike Kernick being sentenced while outside her home, Mosier is approached by her Russian contact, who warns her that the Russians are keeping tabs on them equal to them keeping tabs on the Russians which leaves her unnerved.
9	9	"Compromised"	Ed Ornelas	Katie Swain	December 4, 2018	FBI107	9.72
The FBI team is called to assist when Damon Cruz, a witness in witness protection program, is assassinated. After Maggie and O.A. apprehend the assassin, Maggie gets him to reveal that he purchased the information on Cruz's location from Vincent Marino. The FBI storms Marino's home, only to find him dead. Suspicion falls on US Marshall handler Paul Ackerman when another protected witness, Maya Nelson, is killed which proves to be true as it's revealed that Ackerman is now corrupt, leaking the names of witnesses including Amber Turner. During the case, Maggie goes undercover as Turner and helps bring down Ackerman who's promptly arrested.
10	10	"The Armorer's Faith"	Nicole Rubio	Andrew Wilder	December 11, 2018	FBI111	9.04
O.A. is called upon to go undercover when an arms buyer is assassinated on the tarmac of an airport in London, the United Kingdom. The dead man, Otan Reis had been turned by members of another branch of the FBI and was going to help take down Martin Vickers, who is selling 50 new generation shoulder-mounted, laser-guided anti-tank missiles that could be used to shoot down planes. The handler of the dead man was O.A.'s former instructor at Quantico, Rowan Quinn who has a hostile encounter with O.A. Despite OA being dropped into the 14 month assignement with just 24 hours of prep time, they almost bring down Vickers but are beaten to the punch by Vickers's daughter Arianna, who had sold him out to a Mexican cartel, the Los Zetas prepared to pay more to get the weapons, Jubal expressing his feelings of terror as if the Zetas receive the weaponry, they're going to light up every border crossing between New York and San Diego. At the pier, Martin is shot dead by a Zetas hitman and Arianna tries to flee, before leaving O.A and Quinn to fend off her goons, but is arrested in her attempted escape by Maggie. While in hospital, O.A. learns from Quinn that the man was going through personal problems at the time O.A. was in Quantico and regularly chose a recruit to pick on under the belief it would make them stronger, something O.A. refuses to accept. Later, OA travels to Quantico and prepares to give a new group of FBI recruits a lecture on his recent undercover operation.: Billy Burke (Rowan Quinn) is credited as a Special Guest Star.
11	11	"Identity Crisis"	Norberto Barba	Rick Eid	January 15, 2019	FBI112	9.33
After judge Leslie Chapman sentences a man to life in prison, she is murdered along with her daughter, Sam. Maggie and O. A. investigate the scene and looks for a possible link related to the sentencing. Bell and Zidan come across club owners Jack Rossi and Ray Costa, whose club Chapman visited only hours before her death. They also cross paths with Gina Pratt, a friend of Bell and undercover agent working in Rossi and Costa's inner circle. The team implements Pratt's operation into their investigation after it's revealed that Rossi and Costa are secretly dealing drugs, with Rossi also having a connection to Sam Chapman while Jubal goes undercover again, posing as a friend of Gina's although his role ends when the drug dealers fail to arrive at the pre-arranged meeting spot. After failing to strike deals with Rossi, Pratt expresses sympathy with him, putting her career at risk and causing Maggie to believe she's developed Stockholm Syndrome as a result of working undercover for fourteen months. Maggie and OA arrest Rossi while Maggie learns from Dana that due to Gina lying to them, the US Attorney's Office is bringing charges against her.
12	12	"A New Dawn"	Terry Miller	Brian Anthony	January 22, 2019	FBI110	7.40
The FBI team investigate the murder of a misogynist white-supremacist right-wing activist, Nathaniel Bain, at the Paul Rivera college campus (the same college O.A.'s younger sister Amira attends). When it leads them to a former staff member of the campus's newspaper, Claire, O.A. and Maggie turn to Amira, who also works in the paper. Maggie infiltrates the radical organization they believe responsible for the murder, New Dawn by going undercover. The team soon discover Professor Will Kelly provoked the attack. Heather who Maggie met later travels to Bain's funeral, using herself and Amira as hostages, having brought a bomb that can be set off via a cell phone. OA manages to convince Heather to surrender and let Amira go, reuniting Amira with OA while Heather is arrested.
13	13	"Partners in Crime"	Jean De Segonzac	Claire Demorest	February 12, 2019	FBI113	9.45
Maggie and O.A. searches for a couple who is responsible for armed robberies that led to the death of an off-duty NYPD officer, Oliver West. While the male suspect is identified as Patrick Cross, the situation turns out to be far more complex than thought when they realize that the female is a missing 18 year old, Julia Parker. However the CCTV footage does not add up, given the girl's height is different to her actual height. The team deduces that the second girl is missing 15 year old Katharine James. After being cornered by the FBI and NYPD, Cross takes hostages in a nearby restaurant. With Maggie and OA dealing with the crisis, Jubal goes into the field, resucing Katherine while Julia ends the siege by shooting Cross dead as Jubal deals with his ex-wife now having a new boyfriend.
14	14	"Exposed"	Norberto Barba	David Amann	February 19, 2019	FBI114	9.06
An investigative journalist, Rob McCann, is murdered and the team uncovers information linking the incident to past cases. They discover he was investigating a pharmaceutical company who produced a drug for childhood leukemia with a 29% mortality rate with Russel Donovan being arrested by Maggie and OA when he attempts to flee to Canada, Donovan revealed to be the head of the company that released the drugs in question. McCann's informant, William Patterson, is assassinated in an alleged car accident. They also discover the same jogger who appeared on CCTV in a case in Michigan in the death of a state senator. The jogger is later identified as the assassin, Frank Cutler. Maggie learns her husband's death was not an accident, after spotting Cutler in the background of an old video of her and Jason. OA initially dismisses her suspicion, before finding evidence to the contrary. After learning that Cutler was involved in Jason's death, Maggie confronts him at the hospital, but he dies after a second surgery.
15	15	"Scorched Earth"	Nick Gomez	Rick Eid & Brian Anthony	February 26, 2019	FBI115	9.45
Wall Street Keller Hogan CEO Veronica Klein is murdered by a bomb planted in her office. Soon after, a barista, Carly Fincher, is also killed in a bombing. Their connections are in contrast, with Fincher being a blogger and Klein being known for sacking anyone undermining her leadership. The team question Nick Frost, who sent a threat to Klein. A male profiler, Supervisory Special Agent Spencer Briggs, is sent by headquarters to help the team and he clashes with Dana's authority, notably arguing with statistics, likelihood and different priorities while Dana proves him otherwise right over time. Frost points the team to Stuart Moore, who was also sacked by Klein. They discover Moore attempted suicide a week before the bombings, and suspicion turns to his son, Cameron, who idolised him. Maggie and OA soon learn Cameron was furious over his father losing his job and he's targeting the club where Frost attends. Eventually, Maggie manages to get the bomb into a freezer, stopping the attack from happening. She and OA later return to the JOC, receiving applause for their efforts while Briggs leaves, appreciating Dana's own skills as a profiler.
16	16	"Invisible"	Charles S. Carroll	Joe Halpin	March 12, 2019	FBI116	8.95
Elizabeth Chase, the daughter of media mogul Benjamin Chase, is kidnapped while leaving a dinner with him. The FBI look for possible assailants among high school society, before the kidnapper makes a ransom. The money is picked up by a homeless man, who leads them to an employee working for Chase, who took advantage of the case to get back at him. A lead on Elizabeth's missing inhaler leads them to CCTV footage capturing Charlie Jacobs after stealing one from a pharmacy. After Bell and Zidan chase Jacobs, he blames Elizabeth before taking his own life by jumping off a roof. After rescuing her from Jacobs's cabin in Pound Ridge, she reveals that Jacobs possibly worked with someone planning a shooting, the team soon learning that Sam Musk who has a crush on Elizabeth wants to target an event to impress her with Maggie and OA convincing Sam to surrender while OA gets shot in the chest when Sam's gun goes off but the wound is non-fatal while Kristen applies to become a field agent, an application which Quantico and Mosier accepts.
17	17	"Apex"	Jean De Segonzac	Andrew Wilder	March 26, 2019	FBI117	9.13
Bell and Zidan assist the NYPD with a possible serial killer who photographs his victims in full make-up in perfect lighting. Initially, the team are faced with three victims, but the number rises to ten after more are revealed but the case takes a turn when Deputy Mayor Lynn Carver informs Mosier that the mayor's office does not want bad publicity for the city and scaring away tourists. The team soon learn that Robert Burke is the murderer posing as a photographer with Maggie and OA preventing Burke from claiming another victim.
18	18	"Most Wanted"	Fred Berner	René Balcer	April 2, 2019	FBI118	9.08
The team investigates when an ICE deportation officer Thomas Gilman kills his family consisting of his wife, Connie and two children, Mia and Roy and flees, the resulting explosion destroying his house while leaving one neighbor dead and two in the ICU. They soon collaborate with the FBI's Fugitive Task Force led by SSA Jess LaCroix later beginning a search for Gilman by talking to the people Gilman encountered as the body count from Gilman's rampage begins increasing. It's soon revealed that Gilman is motivated by the desire to exact revenge against his mother who has recently died even though Gilman is refusing to believe it as when they were children, Gilman and his brother, Mike Venutti were separated as Gilman stayed behind with his abusive father while their mother took Mike and left.: This episode is the backdoor pilot for FBI: Most Wanted. based on FBI Ten Most Wanted Fugitives "Robert William Fisher" and also marks the debut appearance of Alana de la Garza as Isobel Castille. Julian McMahon (Jess LaCroix), Kellan Lutz (Kenny Crosby), Roxy Sternberg (Sheryll Barnes), Keisha Castle-Hughes (Hana Gibson), Nathaniel Arcand (Clinton Skye) and Alana de la Garza (Isobel Castille) are all credited as Special Guest Stars.
19	19	"Conflict of Interest"	Christine Swanson	Nick Santora	April 16, 2019	FBI119	8.76
The FBI investigates the murder of Ryan Parker, the Deputy Assistant Secretary for Regional Trade and his driver Scott Callum, who was unknowingly used as a pawn by a dangerous drug-trafficking ring, the White Horses. The drugs are revealed to have been delivered through with his translator, with the drugs being identified as carfentanil, a more powerful and deadlier drug than both heroin and morphine. The team track down a JFK airport worker who served as a middle man, but he is killed at the hospital via suffocation before they can speak to him. Jubal unwillingly gets his friend and former drug addict Morris Kalu, a man who was previously a member of the White Horses involved, putting him through an undercover operation to get to the leader, Tayo but when Morris's cover is blown, Jubal, Maggie and OA race to save him. Eventually, Tayo holds Morris hostage with Jubal firing a single shot that kills Tayo and saves Morris. OA finds himself reconnecting with his friend, Juan who later overdoses on some carfentanil, forcing him to be transported to the hospital for treatment, OA left devastated when he learns Juan died off-screen and in disbelief at not realizing Juan was an addict, Jubal telling him all it takes is one bad day. Checking in on Morris, Jubal discovers he's on the verge of relapsing, the two leaving together for an AA meeting.
20	20	"What Lies Beneath"	Vincent Misiano	David Amann	April 30, 2019	FBI120	8.86
When controversial State Security Investigations Service leader Ahmed El-Masri from Egypt comes to New York for a heart transplant, O.A. is assigned to the security detail. While on route to the hospital, El-Masri's convoy is ambushed and is diverted to Hope General Hospital. With OA on the protection detail for El-Masri, Maggie is assigned a temporary partner, agent Art Perkins (Titus Makin Jr.) to track down the assailant, who is revealed to be working for professional assassin, Zev Solin, a Mossad officer with a reputation for being a ruthless killer capable of eliminating protected targets, Jubal revealing Solin once blew up a plane with 63 passengers just to kill his main target. The bomb is eventually found and defused with OA learning his cousin who was arrested on El-Masri's orders died in prison and it's soon revealed that the operation failed, El-Masri dying because his body rejected the new heart.
21	21	"Appearances"	Jean De Segonzac	Joe Halpin	May 7, 2019	FBI121	8.76
The FBI investigates the murder of a fellow FBI agent, Greg Kennedy. When it is revealed he lived a double life, the team struggle to decide how much to tell his wife, Linda who's also an FBI agent and one of Maggie's closest friends, the two having gone to Quantico together. They learn from the bartender Kennedy met, that he was looking into "the devil", revealed to be biker gang member Mason Thorne. The gang was also dealing drugs after attorney Mike Krawley introduced them to Philadelphia dealer Michael Rizzo. Thorne is found murdered, Maggie and OA finding his body underneath a couch, and Rizzo reveals that Krawley murdered him and has CCTV footage to prove it while Linda interferes with the investigation when she went to Krawley's office, before finding him dead at the biker club house. Maggie and OA arrest Tommy Chase who is revealed to have killed Krawley in revenge.
22	22	"Closure"	Nicole Rubio	Rick Eid	May 14, 2019	FBI122	8.56
Angela Perez is kidnapped and later murdered by assassin Carlos Sanchez. The FBI connect Sanchez to a Mexican drug cartel, and later the company Perez worked for, as a front for money laundering. Bell deduces that the same person ordered Jason dead, and it is revealed to be Perez's supervisor Sophie Keller, who ordered the hits. After chasing her to a marina in an attempted escape, she tells Bell that the cartel forced her to order the hits. With Keller giving up information on the cartel, Maggie finally gets closure for Jason's death. Mosier confides in Jubal and announces that she will be retiring as special-agent-in-charge, having already submitted her retirement papers after realizing her decision to let Maggie proceed could have cost Maggie her career or worse while noting that for the first time in her career, she made a decision based on feelings, not logic while Maggie and OA go out to dinner, noting it's been eighteen months since they became partners and it's time for new beginnings.: This episode marks the final appearance of Sela Ward (Dana Mosier) and it is the last episode of the entire FBI series to have Jeremy Sisto (Jubal Valentine) listed under the "With" credit.

== Production ==
=== Development ===
The origins of the series go back to the Television Critics Association summer 2016 press tour, where Wolf revealed plans for a crime drama series, placed in New York and set in the world of the FBI. Wolf's original plan was to introduce it on the NBC network as a planned spin-off to his New York crime drama Law & Order: Special Victims Unit, where it was intended to introduce an FBI agent character, but NBC ultimately did not go through with it and the idea was later put on hold for different reasons. It's Wolf's first drama series to launch on a network other than NBC in 15 years. CBS officially picked up the series on September 20, 2017. The series is produced by CBS Television Studios and Universal Television.

=== Casting ===
On March 1, 2018, Zeeko Zaki was cast as Omar Adom. A week later, Jeremy Sisto was cast as Jubal, including Ebonée Noel also cast as Kristin. Before the end of the month, Missy Peregrym had joined the cast as Maggie. The FBI Special Agent in Charge in the first episode ("Pilot") was Ellen Solberg, played by Connie Nielsen. On May 16, 2018, the day of scheduling the series for fall 2018, Nielsen was announced to have left the series for undisclosed reasons.

On July 13, 2018, Sela Ward was cast in the second episode as Dana Mosier who fulfills a similar role to Connie Nielsen who was in the first episode. During the season finale, it was indicated that Ward would be departing the series after the first season.

== Broadcast and release ==
The season premiered on CBS on September 25, 2018. It aired on Tuesdays at 9:00 p.m. Canada's Global TV premiered the show at the same time as the United States premiere.

== Reception ==
=== Critical response ===
On the review aggregator website Rotten Tomatoes, the first season has an approval rating of 63% based on 24 reviews, with an average rating of 6.22 out of 10. The website's critical consensus reads, "Dick Wolf's new series sports a compelling cast and adrenaline-spiking spectacle, although some viewers may find this retread of the mega-producer's previous procedural formulas overly familiar." Metacritic, which uses a weighted average, assigned a score of 57 out of 100 based on 13 critics, indicating "mixed or average" reviews.

=== Ratings ===
The series premiere drew approximately 10 million viewers, and scored a 1.3/5 rating/share, beating out the second season premiere of Bull which occupied the same timeslot the previous year. The season finale, "Closure", earned 8.56 million people. For the first season, FBI was the 11th most seen show in total viewership, averaging 12.37 million.

Viewership and ratings per episode of FBI season 1
No.	Title	Air date	Rating/share (18–49)	Viewers (millions)	DVR (18–49)	DVR viewers (millions)	Total (18–49)	Total viewers (millions)
1	"Pilot"	September 25, 2018	1.3/5	10.09	0.8	4.07	2.1	14.16
2	"Green Birds"	October 2, 2018	1.2/5	9.37	0.7	3.70	1.9	13.07
3	"Prey"	October 9, 2018	1.0/4	9.17	0.7	3.56	1.7	12.74
4	"Crossfire"	October 16, 2018	1.0/5	9.31	0.6	3.51	1.6	12.82
5	"Doomsday"	October 23, 2018	1.0/5	8.82	0.7	3.61	1.7	12.44
6	"Family Man"	October 30, 2018	1.0/5	9.41	0.7	3.22	1.7	12.63
7	"Cops and Robbers"	November 13, 2018	1.1/5	9.19	0.7	3.55	1.8	12.75
8	"This Land is Your Land"	November 20, 2018	1.0/5	8.91	0.7	3.58	1.7	12.49
9	"Compromised"	December 4, 2018	1.0/5	9.72	0.7	3.52	1.7	13.24
10	"The Armorer's Faith"	December 11, 2018	1.0/4	9.04	0.6	3.50	1.6	12.54
11	"Identity Crisis"	January 15, 2019	1.0/5	9.33	0.5	3.20	1.5	12.54
12	"A New Dawn"	January 22, 2019	0.8/4	7.40	0.7	3.64	1.5	11.04
13	"Partners in Crime"	February 12, 2019	1.0/4	9.45	0.6	3.65	1.6	13.11
14	"Exposed"	February 19, 2019	0.9/4	9.06	0.7	3.95	1.6	13.02
15	"Scorched Earth"	February 26, 2019	1.0/5	9.45	0.6	3.76	1.6	13.21
16	"Invisible"	March 12, 2019	0.9/4	8.95	0.7	3.62	1.6	12.58
17	"Apex"	March 26, 2019	0.9/4	9.13	0.6	3.57	1.5	12.70
18	"Most Wanted"	April 2, 2019	0.9/4	9.08	0.7	3.73	1.6	12.81
19	"Conflict of Interest"	April 16, 2019	0.9/4	8.76	0.6	3.82	1.5	12.58
20	"What Lies Beneath"	April 30, 2019	0.9/4	8.86	0.5	3.48	1.4	12.34
21	"Appearances"	May 7, 2019	0.8/4	8.76	0.5	3.45	1.3	12.11
22	"Closure"	May 14, 2019	0.8/4	8.56	0.6	3.51	1.4	12.07
