= CIA (TV series) =

American television series (2026–present)

- Genre: Crime drama; Police procedural
- Created by: Dick Wolf; David Hudgins; Nicole Perlman; David Chasteen; Warren Leight
- Developed by: David Chasten; Nicole Perlman
- Showrunner: Mike Weiss
- Starring: Tom Ellis; Nick Gehlfuss; Natalee Linez; Necar Zadegan
- Country of origin: United States
- Original language: English
- No. of seasons: 2
- No. of episodes: 19

Production
- Executive producers: Peter Jankowski; Anastasia Puglisi; Nicole Perlman; David Chasteen; Paul Cabbad; Ken Girotti; Mike Weiss; Dick Wolf
- Producers: Ash Steele; Tom Ellis
- Cinematography: Jonathan Beattie
- Editor: Megan D'Arco
- Running time: 43 minutes
- Production companies: Wolf Entertainment; CBS Studios; Universal Television

Original release
- Network: CBS
- Release: February 23, 2026 – present

Related
- FBI; FBI: Most Wanted; FBI: International

CIA is an American police procedural television series created by Dick Wolf, David Hudgins, Nicole Perlman, David Chasteen, and Warren Leight that premiered on CBS on February 23, 2026. The series is produced by Universal Television in association with Wolf Entertainment and CBS Studios with Wolf, Perlman, Chasteen, and Peter Jankowski serving as executive producers. It follows the teaming of a Central Intelligence Agency (CIA) case officer with an agent of the Federal Bureau of Investigation (FBI); the two are based in New York City and work together investigating domestic threats to the United States. It is a spin-off from the FBI television franchise. In March 2026, the series was renewed for a second season which premiered on October 5, 2026.

== Premise ==
CIA case officer Colin Glass is a bit of a loose cannon with no regard for the rules, and FBI special agent Bill Goodman is strictly by-the-book. The two of them must team up and find a way to work together to protect the United States from domestic terrorism threats.

== Cast ==
=== Main ===
- Tom Ellis as Colin Glass (season 1–present), a CIA case officer
- Nick Gehlfuss as William "Bill" Randall Goodman (season 1–present), an FBI special agent from the FBI New York field office
- Natalee Linez as Gina Gosian (season 1–present), a CIA analyst
- Necar Zadegan as Nikki Reynard (season 1–present), the Deputy Chief of the CIA's New York station

=== Recurring ===
- Dan Bakkedahl as Larry Kriegman
- Cotter Smith as Peter Cooper
- Kathleen Rose Perkins as Kimberly Graham
- Angela Sarafyan as Antoinette "Toni" Napier
- Sabrina Victor as Teddy Marsh (season 2–present)

=== Crossover characters ===
- Jeremy Sisto as Jubal Valentine (season 1), Assistant Special Agent in Charge (ASAC) in the FBI New York field office
- James Chen as Ian Lim (season 1), an FBI Technical Analyst in the FBI New York field office
- Missy Peregrym as Maggie Bell (season 1), FBI Special Agent in the FBI New York field office
- Alana de la Garza as Isobel Castille (season 1), Special Agent in Charge (SAC) in the FBI New York field office
- John Boyd as Stuart Scola (season 2), FBI Special Agent in the FBI New York field office

== Episodes ==
=== Series overview ===
Season	Episodes	Originally released		Rank	Viewers (millions)
Season	Episodes	First released	Last released	Rank	Viewers (millions)
1	12	February 23, 2026	May 18, 2026	24	8.10
2	TBA	October 5, 2026	TBA	TBA	TBA

=== Season 1 (2026) ===
No. overall	No. in season	Title	Directed by	Written by	Original release date	Prod. code	U.S. viewers (millions)
1	1	"Directed Energy"	Ken Girotti	Mike Weiss	February 23, 2026	CIA106	3.78
When a top-secret weapon is stolen from a defense contractor in broad daylight, CIA agent Colin Glass and FBI agent Bill Goodman investigate. After the case has been solved, Bill learns from the FBI's New York Field Office ASAC- Assistant Special Agent in Charge Jubal Valentine he's being assigned to a task force after telling him that FBI counterintelligence believes there's a mole operating in the CIA's New York operations and that it's Bill's job to expose the mole whoever he or she is.: Jeremy Sisto (Jubal Valentine) is credited as a Special Guest Star.
2	2	"Fatal Defect"	Jon Cassar	Alex Berger	March 2, 2026	CIA107	3.59
The appearance of a known smuggler sends Colin and Bill upstate to investigate things as they also enlist the help of a foreign intelligence officer.
3	3	"Bridge of Lies"	Peter Stebbings	Brendan Feeney	March 9, 2026	CIA108	3.74
When an officer in Hong Kong is detained, Nikki travels there to get him out but when she's arrested, the team frantically work to get her back to New York City before it's too late.: Jeremy Sisto (Jubal Valentine) is credited as a Special Guest Star.
4	4	"Forced Labor"	Norberto Barba	Siobhan Byrne O'Connor	March 16, 2026	CIA104	3.41
The team investigate when a Belarus national who's wanted for various crimes poses as an expectant father as Colin, Bill and the team work to expose an illegal smuggling ring.: Hope Davis (Stephanie Harris) is credited as a Special Guest Star.
5	5	"Deep Cover"	Jon Cassar	Richard Sweren	March 23, 2026	CIA102	3.50
When a cyber engineer and her family are murdered, Bill, Colin and the team scramble to catch those responsible and prevent any future attacks.
6	6	"Pledge of Allegiance"	Jon Cassar	Céline C. Robinson	March 30, 2026	CIA109	3.50
The team jump into action when Colin receives a tip concerning a terrorist plot, only to discover it concerns a young man who was kidnapped in Turkey nine years ago at the age of 15 and was subsequently declared dead as the team race to prevent the attack while Colin investigates someone close to Bill.: Jeremy Sisto (Jubal Valentine) is credited as a Special Guest Star.
7	7	"Elimination Game"	Anna Dokoza	Céline C. Robinson	April 13, 2026	CIA105	3.33
While securing an international soccer match, Colin and Bill learn of a bomb threat connected to two missing players. With time of the essence, the team enlists the help of FBI SAC Isobel Castille and field agent Maggie Bell.: Missy Peregrym (Maggie Bell) and Alana de la Garza (Isobel Castille) are credited as Special Guest Stars.
8	8	"Orbital"	Ken Girotti	Ben Dubash	April 20, 2026	CIA110	3.56
Bill and Colin go undercover along with Gina to locate and retrieve a stolen crashed satellite component that's carrying extremely dangerous nuclear material.: Donal Logue (Jonah LeRoux) is credited as a Special Guest Star.
9	9	"Blood Money"	Ludovic Littee	Fran Kuperberg	April 27, 2026	CIA111	3.33
Colin and Bill investigate a woman's intelligence concerning a terror leader that has them uncovering a family run terrorist network. They must recruit a new informant to help them dismantle the operation while Bill uncovers something startling.: Jeremy Sisto (Jubal Valentine) is credited as a Special Guest Star.
10	10	"Rare Earth"	Jean de Segonzac	Ben Dubash	May 4, 2026	CIA103	3.26
The team investigate when a foreign diplomat who entered the US under unknown circumstances is murdered.: Jeremy Sisto (Jubal Valentine) is credited as a Special Guest Star.
11	11	"Forbidden Eye"	Milena Govich	Alex Berger	May 11, 2026	CIA112	3.46
When Colin's CIA mentor disappears, he enlists Bill and the team to help him.
12	12	"Broken Glass"	Ken Girotti	Mike Weiss	May 18, 2026	CIA113	4.16
Bill and Colin race to stop an intelligence company from concealing the fact intelligence was stolen while they track down a dangerous person from Colin's own past.: Jeremy Sisto (Jubal Valentine) is credited as a Special Guest Star.

=== Season 2 (2026) ===
No. overall	No. in season	Title	Directed by	Written by	Original release date	Prod. code	U.S. viewers (millions)
13	1	"The Deep"	Ken Girotti	Mike Weiss	October 5, 2026	CIA201	3.84
14	2	"Dead Drop"	Ludo Littee	Ken Woodruff	October 12, 2026	CIA202	3.69
15	3	"Radio Active"	Milena Govich	Alex Berger	October 19, 2026	CIA203	3.70
16	4	"Black Tie Optional"	Cory Bowles	Brendan Feeney	October 26, 2026	CIA204	3.39
17	5	"Real Intelligence"	Norberto Barba	Myung Joh Wesner	November 2, 2026	CIA205	3.72
18	6	"Legacy"	Ken Girotti	Ken Woodruff	November 9, 2026	CIA206	3.73
19	7	"Inside Men"	Peter Sollett	Fran Kuperberg	November 16, 2026	CIA207	4.05
20	8	"Burned Rubber"	Takashi Doscher	Phil Buatti	November 30, 2026	CIA208	TBD
21	9	"Past Lives"	Michael Katleman	Brendan Feeney	December 7, 2026	CIA209	TBD
22	10	"Mercy"	Ken Girotti	Alex Berger	December 14, 2026	CIA210	TBD

== Production ==
=== Development ===
The series, a spin-off of the FBI television franchise and tentatively titled FBI: CIA, was in development at CBS in January 2025, originally intending to begin with a backdoor pilot airing as an FBI episode. After the proposed backdoor pilot had been repeatedly pushed toward the end of the season, FBI was nearing the end of production for the season, while casting for CIA was still underway, so the series was instead being considered for a straight-to-series pick-up without the backdoor pilot launch and with a new script. The series was created by Dick Wolf and David Hudgins, with Hudgins initially planning to be the showrunner. While a procedural in nature, Hudgins said that it would be different from FBI because it would focus on the relationship dynamic between the two leads from different organizations and approaches.

CBS made the straight-to-series order in April with Wolf and Hudgins executive producing along with former CIA officer David Chasteen, Nicole Perlman, and Peter Jankowski. Production companies for the series are Wolf Entertainment, CBS Studios, and Universal Television. Eriq La Salle joined the series in July to direct the pilot and executive produce. By July, Warren Leight took over as showrunner for Hudgins, and the series was delayed to adjust. While in production, La Salle left the series, followed by Leight, with both stepping down as executive producers, with Mike Weiss, FBI showrunner, expected to take over on CIA as well. The premiere ended up being directed by Ken Girotti. In March 2026, CBS renewed the series for a second season premiered on October 5, 2026.

=== Casting ===
Upon the series order announcement in April 2025, Tom Ellis was cast to star as the CIA case officer. Ellis said he had been doing chemistry reads as part of casting for a partner on the show, and confirmed his character would be American. However, Ellis later met with executive producer Dick Wolf, who had apparently changed Ellis's character at the last minute to be British - he would have a dual British-American citizenship, but speak with a received pronunciation accent. The second lead opposite Ellis was not cast until September 2025 when Nick Gehlfuss was cast as the FBI special agent working with Ellis' CIA officer. Michael Michele was also cast as chief of the CIA's New York station, and Natalee Linez joined the cast as a CIA analyst. After production began, Michele left the series in November, requiring her role to be recast and filled by Necar Zadegan. Jeremy Sisto also features in the series, crossing over from the larger FBI franchise.

=== Filming ===
The series began filming in September 2025 in New York City. After the departures of Michele and La Salle, production was planned to continue, but it was ultimately put on hold when Leight left as well.

== Reception ==
On the review aggregator website Rotten Tomatoes, the series holds an approval rating of 63% based on 8 reviews. Metacritic, which uses a weighted average, gave a score of 47 out of 100 based on five critics, indicating "mixed or average" reviews.
