= FBI: Most Wanted season 5 =

Season of American television series

FBI: Most Wanted
- Season 5
- Starring: Dylan McDermott; Shantel VanSanten; Roxy Sternberg; Keisha Castle-Hughes; Edwin Hodge
- No. of episodes: 13

Release
- Original network: CBS
- Original release: February 13 – May 21, 2024

Season chronology
- ← Previous; Season 4 Next → Season 6

The fifth season of the American police procedural television drama series FBI: Most Wanted was announced on May 9, 2022, along with the fourth season. The fifth season premiered on February 13, 2024, and ended on May 21, 2024 with 13 episodes.

== Cast changes ==
This is the first season to feature Shantel VanSanten as Special Agent Nina Chase in a main cast role.

== Cast and characters ==
=== Main ===
- Dylan McDermott as Supervisory Special Agent Remy Scott
- Shantel VanSanten as Special Agent Nina Chase
- Roxy Sternberg as Special Agent/Second-in-Command Sheryll Barnes
- Keisha Castle-Hughes as Special Agent/Technical Analyst Hana Gibson
- Edwin Hodge as Special Agent Ray Cannon

=== Recurring ===
- J. D. Martin as Corey Marks, Scott's nephew
- Caroline Harris as Cora Love, Cannon's love interest and later fiancé
- Ja'Siah Young as Caleb Love, Cora's son
- Samantha Smith as Therapist
- Fedna Jacquet as Charlotte Gaines, Barnes' wife

=== Guests ===
- Steven Williams as Raymond Cannon Sr., Cannon's father
- Sean Kaufman as Eric Fontaine, an AI Startup Chief Technology Officer
- Susan Misner as Abby Deaver, an attorney from Missouri
- Michael Raymond-James as Ethan McPherson, a US Air Marshal who befriends Gibson

=== Crossover characters ===
- John Boyd as Special Agent Stuart Scola, Nina's boyfriend and father of Douglas (FBI)

== Episodes ==
No. overall	No. in season	Title	Directed by	Written by	Original release date	Prod. code	U.S. viewers (millions)
74	1	"Above & Beyond"	Ken Girotti	David Hudgins & Elizabeth Rinehart	February 13, 2024	MW501	5.36
In Salisbury, Virginia, a deal between a NASA employee and an anti-government activist goes awry when a drunk man intervenes and is killed. The Fugitive Task Force welcome their newest member to replace Kristin Gaines, Nina Chase, as they take on chasing down the employee's boyfriend, who has been trying to secure the remainder of the money from the deal. He is however later killed when he tries to escape a marina, and the employee's body is found in his boat. The anti-government group is revealed to be planning a mass attack on the NRO offices by hacking a satellite and increasing the internal gas pressure to blow. Barnes and Chase join SWAT in taking down the leader and hacker at the former's college and stopping the gas and satellite hack altogether. Scott struggles with establishing a bond with his nephew Corey, but becomes more determined to succeed after attending therapy. Additionally, he battles rumours from Chase about him being romantically involved with Gaines, who has now departed the team. Note: Starting with this episode, Shantel VanSanten (Nina Chase) is promoted to a series regular after recurring in Season 4. Dylan McDermott (Remy Scott) is now credited as an Executive Producer.
75	2	"Footsteps"	Milena Govich	Richard Sweren	February 20, 2024	MW502	4.93
Retired NYPD officer Michael O'Hearn and his son are killed in a car bomb, and some time later, another officer is injured by another bomb, but later dies of his injuries. The Fugitive Task Force learn from a former colleague of O'Hearn that they all worked for a secret unit, the Ghost Squad, established following 9/11 to tackle domestic terrorism, and their links to an incident involving the torture of Turkish citizen Kamal Berk in New Orleans. The case takes a personal turn for Cannon, when he learns that his father, Ray Sr., questioned Berk before the Ghost Squad took over and later the CIA. With the help of his long lost daughter, Jeyla, Berk has been planning his revenge against those who tortured him. Upon arriving at the Cannon residence, Cannon talks Berk down, while Scott does likewise with Jeyla. Eventually Berk finds his peace and he and Jeyla surrender. Cannon proposes moving in with Cora, which she accepts after passing her doctor's degree. He later introduces her and Caleb to his father as they go out to play bowling.
76	3	"Ghost in the Machine"	Peter Stebbings	Ryan Causey	February 27, 2024	MW503	4.67
Social influencer Poppy Lee is killed after being lured to a hotel room under the pretext of a business meeting. The Fugitive Task Force find themselves delving into the world of artificial intelligence when they learn that Lee's likeness was used for a romantic AI partner app. When the company owner is killed by the AI, the team learn that its system has been breached by the former AI owner Geoff Sherman, who originally modelled the AI on his deceased wife. The team track him back to the company HQ after he kidnaps his in-laws, locking himself in the server room with his sister-in-law, with the intention to upload his wife's AI to the wider web. Unable to enter, the team shuts down the power and negotiate the sister-in-law's release, but Sherman commits suicide. Gibson holds a seminar at Quantico specialising in computer expertise. She is approached by soon-to-be cybersecurity agent Kat Vaughn, who admires her work. Later, she allows her to be her new roommate when her planned flat purchase falls through.
77	4	"Hollow"	Jean de Segonzac	Wendy West	March 12, 2024	MW504	4.95
When a victim survives an encounter with the alleged Hollow Man serial killer in Akwesasne, the team join the tribal police in hunting down the killer and put an end to his killing spree. However, their initial suspect is revealed to have an alibi, which puts them back to square one. They're surprised to learn when the killer later abducts a pregnant indigenous woman, Maya Holt, breaking his usual pattern; and eventually identify him as Hank Fuller, who has been storing his victims' organs in hope of curing his cancer. They head out to the winter wilderness while Holt manages to fight back and break free just as they arrive at the hunting cabin she is kept at. They chase Fuller into the wilderness and discover his slaying hut before killing him. The team rescue Holt from falling from a cliff and bring her to safety. Barnes and Charlotte's relationship begin to show strains from both of their workloads. When Barnes returns from work, she learns that Charlotte has met someone else.
78	5	"Desperate"	Ken Girotti	Elizabeth Rinehart	March 19, 2024	MW505	4.74
A high school debate team and their teacher are abducted at gunpoint in rural Pennsylvania. The Fugitive Task Force face an uphill battle in assuring the missing teenagers' parents, but things take a turn for the worse when one parent decides to pay the ransom all of them received, only for him and his wife to find a severed ear of their son delivered to them. He also reveals that he was in on the abduction for money in order to handle his business' debts and hired enforcers to blackmail companies into selling. The team track the missing teenagers to a coal mine, but discover the teacher has already been killed. When the mine collapses in on itself after the enforcers are eliminated, the team takes the teenagers through the utility elevator when the main one is blocked and up to safety. Scott discovers that Corey has been evicted from his flat after failing to pay his rent. He allows him to stay at his place until he can find a new place. To his disappointment, he also learns that Corey has dropped out of medical school.
79	6	"Fouled Out"	Corey Bowles	D. Dona Le	March 26, 2024	MW506	4.49
Former basketball player Manny Hayesman shoots up the Wolf Den bar at Tobin University and goes on a killing spree before escaping. He later takes an executive hostage and learns about his coach's involvement in a bribing scandal in the basketball world which resulted in stricter rules. The team unwind a complicated web of secrets that ties the coach to famous basketball player Walt Felton, who tasked the coach with oversight of his will. Both Manny and the coach are revealed to be conspiring against Felton to take over his inheritance upon killing him to ensure better opportunities for Manny. As he takes the coach hostage and Felton at gunpoint, the team exposes their conspiracy and Manny turns on the coach, shooting him when he reaches for his gun as he surrenders. Barnes and Charlotte attend couple therapy in the wake of Charlotte's unfaithfulness. Barnes and Scott meet for drinks and share their experiences and challenges in family matters.
80	7	"Rendition"	Sharon Lewis	David Hudgins & Chris Salmanpour	April 2, 2024	MW507	4.98
Four detectives are gunned down by members of the Vasil gang during a prisoner transfer of 19-year-old Bora Allard in New Jersey. The team learns that Allard is actually the son of hitman and former Vasil right-hand-man Danil Khadiyev, who has recently been released on parole. Khadiyev is however working under pressure from the Vasil boss, Anatoly, who seeks to kill his nephew Verkha, and uses Bora as leverage. The case is further complicated when they learn that Bora was framed for killing a witness to his mother's murder. Anatoly dispatches his son to kill Khadiyev, Bora and Verkha when the latter seeks to help them flee the country. But when the deal between them and Anatoly's son goes south, Bora escapes and seeks to kill Anatoly for his mother's murder. Scott manages to talk him down and Anatoly is arrested. Scott manages to get through to Corey in getting his life together, which later inspires him to travel abroad in an attempt to find a renewed purpose in life, and Scott pledges to support him.
81	8	"Supply Chain"	Lisa Robinson	Richard Sweren	April 9, 2024	MW508	4.66
Kelli Parkman abducts teenagers Jayden Rainey and Max Langella, asking the latter to lead her to his fentanyl supplier, Donnie Tyson. The team learn that Kelli's son Isaac died of an overdose and she concluded that the police blamed her for his death. Tyson points Kelli to his supplier, Parnell Vance, but she kills someone after a chaotic struggle. Once she gets to Vance, he turns the tables on her after escaping her restraints. Vance's boss orders her husband to supply $400 000 dollars to pay off their buyer, the LS-19 gang. The team stop them before they can steal the husband's money. Scott disguises himself as the husband in order to get to Vance and his boss, ensuring both of their arrests once the transfer has been made. Despite her good intentions to bring justice for her son, Kelli is arrested for murder. Chase and Scola clash over how to parent their son Douglas, and she seeks advice from Barnes, who tells her not to overcompensate too much in her parenting approach. Note: John Boyd (Stuart Scola) is credited as a Special Guest Star.
82	9	"The Return"	Ken Girotti	Khalid A. Moalim	April 16, 2024	MW509	5.03
A truck carrying Nigerian artefacts is stolen on the way from Connecticut. The Fugitive Task Force initially draft the theory based on museum director Alicia Foreman's background on repatriation after learning that she was in on the take, alongside her boyfriend and a museum donor's assistant. However, the case takes a turn when they learn that Nigerian warlord Bankole Udoji has been masquerading as Foreman's biological father and used her knowledge of the artefacts in order to steal them and sell them to a Russian dealer in order to finance a coup in his home country. The team interrupt the deal as Foreman's boyfriend and Udoji meet their dealer and flee as they move in. Cannon and Chase corner Udoji with a hostage, and disarm a second time after he attempts to take Chase's gun. Cannon considers proposing to Cora and shares his plan with his father, who gives him an engagement ring inherited through the family's history. Cannon proposes to Cora after a dinner, and she accepts.
83	10	"Bonne Terre"	Peter Stebbings	David Hudgins & Wendy West	April 23, 2024	MW510	5.11
Judge Wade Gimball and his wife are killed in their Westchester home, and later also his clerk. The team learns that the clerk had blackmailed a former suspect, Curt Rowan, in a case involving two girls who were murdered in St. Louis, but a janitor, Emmett Allen, confessed to the murders and is due to be executed in Bonne Terre, Missouri, despite new evidence suggesting he is innocent. Scott works with his attorney Abby Deaver to convince the judge to consider the new evidence, but it proves futile. The remainder of the team chase Rowan back to New York, where he is subsequently arrested, and DNA samples are taken from him, which is a match for the new evidence. Allen's execution proves challenging, while Scott and Deaver resort to asking the Governor to halt the execution, which he does after being convinced by the new evidence. Scott and Deaver head to a motel afterwards for a romantic evening, while Gibson takes an interest in an Air Marshall on her return flight.
84	11	"Radio Silence"	Cory Bowles	Elizabeth Rinehart & D. Dona Le	May 7, 2024	MW511	4.53
Two NYPD officers are shot while responding to a bodega robbery. Not soon after, another pair of officers are shot while responding to a call. The team works with the 86th precinct to identify and catch the killer, which has many patrol officers on edge while responding to calls. The team later identify the killer as Sean Brennan, a retired officer whose son was a cop who committed suicide. They learn that the son had taken a stand against bullying, but his complaints fell on deaf ears. Brennan abducts his son's supervisor and the IA officer who ignored his son's complaints, and has them fight to the death. One of them winds up dead after the team and police find them, who's arrested for his murder. Barnes learns that Charlotte wants a divorce and responsibility for the kids as she plans to take a new attorney job in Washington, D.C., Barnes makes one last appeal for her to stay after she is hospitalized following a shootout while on duty.
85	12	"Derby Day"	Jean de Segonzac	Chris Salmanpour & Ryan Causey	May 14, 2024	MW512	4.55
Mafia informant Jimmy Nando is tortured and killed after inviting a woman home. The team and police suspect that the killers were external hitmen hired by the mafia to kill a witness, and the duo later kill his lawyer, retrieving a ledger belonging to the mafia boss meant as evidence against them. They track the duo to Atlantic City, where they learn from their contractor that they approached him and killed Nando in favour of retrieving blueprints for a casino owned by Mr. Denello. Initially they suspect that the duo is going to rob the casino safe, but later determine that the woman, Alice Thibodeaux, is seeking revenge against Denello for killing her father in a hit and run. The team manage to stop her before he can be killed, but also arrest Denello for the hit and run. Gibson gets to know Air Marshall Ethan McPherson better and invites him home for cooking and drinks. The two also share an evening playing games with Cannon and Cora.
86	13	"Powderfinger"	Ken Girotti	David Hudgins & Wendy West	May 21, 2024	MW513	4.12
A prisoner transport plane crashes outside of Harrisburg, Pennsylvania, with a convict escaping before dying. A New York Times journalist is driven off the road and killed, and a man named William Barlowe, kills his old supervisor and an NTSB investigator at a Gaskins Aerospace plant. The culminating events lead the team and NYPD to a radioactive cesium bomb on a bus and at the Aerospace HQ in New York. Cannon and two patrol units stop and apprehend a hitman, who is revealed to have been hired by Gaskins Aerospace. Barlowe contaminates himself at a pier as he surrenders. It's revealed that he worked for Gaskins and was fired for whistleblowing on radioactive leaks from flowmeters on the parts they made, which led to his firing in an effort by the company to cover it up. They arrest the Gaskins CEO before she can leave for Brazil. As Barnes gradually recovers from her wounds sustained during the Brennan case, the team attend Cannon and Cora's wedding, where also Cannon Sr. surprises everyone with a band from their hometown.

== Production ==
On May 9, 2022, CBS renewed the series for a fourth and fifth season. The season was delayed due to the 2023 Hollywood labor disputes including the 2023 Writers Guild of America strike and 2023 SAG-AFTRA strike.

== Release ==
The fifth season premiered on February 13, 2024.

== Ratings ==
Viewership and ratings per episode of FBI: Most Wanted season 5
No.	Title	Air date	Rating (18–49)	Viewers (millions)	DVR (18–49)	DVR viewers (millions)	Total (18–49)	Total viewers (millions)
1	"Above & Beyond"	February 13, 2024	0.4	5.36	—N/a	—N/a	—N/a	—N/a
2	"Footsteps"	February 20, 2024	0.4	4.93	—N/a	—N/a	—N/a	—N/a
3	"Ghost in the Machine"	February 27, 2024	0.3	4.67	—N/a	—N/a	—N/a	—N/a
4	"Hollow"	March 12, 2024	0.3	4.95	—N/a	—N/a	—N/a	—N/a
5	"Desperate"	March 19, 2024	0.4	4.74	0.2	2.40	0.5	7.14
6	"Fouled Out"	March 26, 2024	0.3	4.49	0.2	2.56	0.6	7.06
7	"Rendition"	April 2, 2024	0.4	4.98	0.2	2.63	0.6	7.60
8	"Supply Chain"	April 9, 2024	0.4	4.66	0.1	2.48	0.5	7.14
9	"The Return"	April 16, 2024	0.4	5.03	0.2	2.49	0.6	7.52
10	"Bonne Terre"	April 23, 2024	0.4	5.11	0.1	2.45	0.5	7.56
11	"Radio Silence"	May 7, 2024	0.3	4.53	0.2	2.35	0.5	6.74
12	"Derby Day"	May 14, 2024	0.3	4.55	0.2	2.26	0.5	6.81
13	"Powderfinger"	May 21, 2024	0.3	4.12	—N/a	—N/a	—N/a	—N/a
