= Most Wanted (FBI) =

- FBI episode
- Episode no.: Season 1 Episode 18
- Directed by: Fred Berner
- Written by: René Balcer
- Production code: FBI118
- Original air date: April 2, 2019

Guest appearances
- Julian McMahon as FBI Supervisory Special Agent Jess LaCroix; Kellan Lutz as FBI Special Agent Kenny Crosby; Roxy Sternberg as FBI Special Agent Sheryll Barnes; Keisha Castle-Hughes as FBI Analyst Hana Gibson; Nathaniel Arcand as FBI Special Agent Clinton Skye; Alana de la Garza as Assistant Special Agent in Charge Isobel Castille; Matthew Lillard as Tommy Gilman; Peter Facinelli as Mike Venutti; YaYa Gosselin as Tali Lacroix; Hannah Myers as Anni; Charlotte English as Mia Gilman; Gwendolyn Ellis as Connie Gilman; Thomas G. Waites as Detective Dryden; Katie McClellan as Jules; Darren Lipari as Lane Cantrell; Jane Stiles as Michelle McDowell; Turner Smith as Mr. Kelly; Elisabeth Ness as Mrs. Kelly; Lynne Lipton as Raquel Venutti; Paul Raskin as Roman; Griffin Henkel as Roy Gilman; Eric Elizaga as Agent Shen; Andrea Jones-Sojola as Arson Investigator; Amy Ward as Booker; Renata Friedman as BCI Detective; Joe Pallister as FDI Captain; Mohammed J. Ali as Gravedigger; Jeanette Eng as News Anchor; Jordan Feltner as State Trooper; Jared P-Smith as SWAT Commander; Nicholas Tarascio as Pilot

Episode chronology
← Previous "Apex"	Next → "Conflict of Interest"
- FBI season 1

"Most Wanted" is the eighteenth episode of the first season of the American crime drama television series FBI. Originally aired on CBS on April 2, 2019, the episode was written by René Balcer and directed by Fred Berner, and was also the backdoor pilot for FBI: Most Wanted. The episode's story is based on FBI Ten Most Wanted Fugitives "Robert William Fisher".

== Plot ==
ICE Deportation Officer Thomas Gilman kills his family consisting of his wife, Connie and two young children, Roy and Mia before fleeing. The next day, his house is destroyed in an explosion that leaves one of his neighbors dead and two in the ICU. Local police summon FBI Special Agents Maggie and O.A. to the scene where they discover Gilman isn't dead but has actually fled in a car belonging to his wife. At the JOC, Special Agent in Charge Dana Mosier, Assistant Special in Charge Jubal Valentine and analyst Kristen Chazal discuss the case as the JOC begins working on finding Gilman with Dana announcing she's calling the FBI's Fugitive Task Force to hunt for Gilman. At a press conference, Isobel Castille, Supervisor of the Fugitive Task Force announces that Special Agent Jess LaCroix and his team are taking over the investigation. At 26 Fed, Jess prepares to leave but Maggie wants herself and O.A. to tag along with Jess informing her that this is in the hands of the Fugitive Task Force and that he has his own team, people who have known him for years although Maggie wants him to call her for the takedown with Jess telling her that there's no promise. At the Fugitive Task Force Headquarters, Jess and his team of agents Sheryll Barnes, Kenny Crosby, Clinton Skye and FBI analyst Hana Gibson all prepare to split up to head to different areas of the State to get answers with Jess also reminding his team they are not there to bring justice to Gilman but to bring Gilman to justice. As the case progresses, more people turn up dead, Gilman having murdered them while the team also investigate Gilman's colleagues, family and friends. Jess eventually calls Jubal for access into the ICE database and after the phone call's ended, Jubal reveals to a curious Maggie that he and LaCroix worked on the Haynes Spree Killer case seven years ago, sometime in 2014 and that Jubal was struggling with his own sobriety with Jess proving to be a help to him and then Jess's wife, Angelyne who was also in Army intelligence died in Afghanistan with Jess going to a dark place as Jubal reveals Jess has a daughter. He also reveals that he offered his help but that Jess managed to pull himself out of that tailspin. After gaining access to the database, the team discover that Mike Venutti is Gilman's brother and that Gilman is seeking revenge against his mother as she took Mike away when Gilman was fourteen years old and Mike was two years old to escape their abusive father. During the interrogation, Mike reveals that their mother is dead, having passed away two months from a brain tumor, something Gilman refuses to believe, having been convinced Mike is protecting her. Eventually, the team lure Gilman to a house with Maggie also arriving, Jess having called her and an FBI SWAT team ready. However, Mike arrives with Gilman taking his brother hostage, forcing Jess to negotiate. During the talks, Clinton fires some rounds in the basement, allowing an FBI SWAT member to give Maggie a shotgun with Maggie tossing Jess the shotgun. As Gilman attempts to shoot, Jess responds by firing the shotgun, the impact severing Gilman's right hand and allowing him to be arrested, ending the case.

== Production ==
The episode was the backdoor pilot for FBI: Most Wanted, which premiered on January 7, 2020. FBI: Most Wanted and FBI reunited again in a crossover episode on March 24, 2020.

=== Casting ===
Julian McMahon, Kellan Lutz, Roxy Sternberg, Keisha Castle-Hughes, and Nathaniel Arcand, all went on to become series regulars on FBI: Most Wanted, with Alana de la Garza and YaYa Gosselin going on to recur.

== Reception ==
=== Ratings ===
In the United States, the episode was watched live by 9.08 million viewers. Within seven days, the episode was watched by 12.81 million viewers.

=== Critical response ===
Ariel B. with So Many Shows! said "Agent Lacroix is a seemingly be all, know all and so far, it’s kind of frustrating. Feels like a stale concept that has been done time and time again—he probably has some story about how he’s become who he is, and how respected he is for just having a great gut. (You’re not as cool as Gibbs, dude.) I’m not loving this backdoor pilot so far, and I miss our team. I know a backdoor pilot opens up the stage for a new show, but it would be nice to see our main characters from time to time."
