= Emotional Rescue (FBI) =

- FBI episode
- Episode no.: Season 2 Episode 19
- Directed by: Monica Raymund
- Written by: Rick Eid & Joe Halpin
- Production code: FBI219
- Original air date: March 31, 2020

Guest appearances
- Catherine Haena Kim as Emily Ryder; Taylor Anthony Miller as Kelly Moran; Tracy Spiridakos as Hailey Upton; Carolyn Braver as Harper Quinlan; Jon McCormick as Lucas Reed; Joseph Raymond Lucero as Marco; Mark Rowe as Tom Quinlan; Dhanish Karthik as Aman Patel; Nathaniel De La Rosa as Santiago Gonzales; Guy Wellman as Guard; Damian Buzzerio as Detective Lopez; Sarah Dacey-Charles as Provost Kaplan; Kenneth Lee as Professor Banks; Jason Cottle as Frank Prichard; Coledyn Garrow as Latin Kid; Rick Faugno as Officer Kindig

Episode chronology
← Previous "American Dreams"	Next → —

"Emotional Rescue" is the nineteenth and final episode of the second season of the American crime drama television series FBI, and the 41st episode overall. Originally aired on CBS on March 31, 2020, the episode was written by Rick Eid and Joe Halpin and directed by Monica Raymund, who is a former cast member of Chicago Fire, which is one of the two sister shows (the other being Chicago Med) to Chicago P.D.. The episode included a crossover appearance from Chicago P.D. star, Tracy Spiridakos as Detective Hailey Upton.

== Plot ==
In a park, Indian national Arman Patel who's also a foreign graduate student pleads for his life as he's beaten to death. Meanwhile, Detective Hailey Upton from Chicago P.D.'s Intelligence Unit arrives at the office and gets paired with O.A. They head out to assess a dead body that was discovered by a jogger and find a receipt in his pocket to a university bookstore. Ryder goes to the university to investigate and finds out that the student had been receiving racial comments. Upton and O.A. go to the student's house, and partway through their search, someone shoots at them. They chase after the shooter but lose track of him. The team then works to track down the student's roommate. Later, at a park, they find a dead body. On the video footage of the park, they see the student's roommate. Unable to track down the roommate, they focus on finding his girlfriend, Harper Quinlan by meeting with her dad, Tom. After finding and interrogating the girlfriend, she gets a ransom call. The caller wants the drugs her boyfriend stole returned, or her father will die. The FBI has the girl set up a meeting with her boyfriend, Lucas Reed, but he doesn't give her any valuable information. As he tries to run, O.A. shoots and kills him. With Upton's help, the team finds the drugs in the roommate's car. The girl and the team manage to save her father and apprehend the men who held him hostage. Afterward, the FBI team and Upton head out to celebrate with a beer.

== Production ==
The episode was set up in the Chicago P.D. episode "Lines", on March 25, 2020. In "Lines", the FBI asked for an officer from Chicago to assist with an unspecified case, and Hank Voight (Jason Beghe) sent Hailey Upton as a punishment for her reckless behavior.

=== Casting ===
Tracy Spiridakos was set to crossover in more FBI episodes, however because production was suspended on the season due to the COVID-19 pandemic, this episode was her only appearance. Series regular, Missy Peregrym did not appear in the episode due to Peregrym's pregnancy, and her character's under cover assignment.

== Reception ==
=== Ratings ===
In the United States, the episode was watched live by 10.85 million viewers. Within seven days, it was watched by 14.09 million viewers. It is currently the most watched episode in the series' history.

=== Critical response ===
Laura Hurley with Cinema Blend said "Hailey fit into the action as OA's partner without taking over the episode, which proves to me that future crossovers and connections can work on both networks. Everybody got a moment in "Emotional Rescue," and it was a solid combination of drama and procedural,... and this was actually one of my favorite episodes of FBI". She went on to say that "[this episode shows that] FBI definitely needs that Season 3 renewal."
