= Natalee Linez =

American actress

- Born: Orange County, California
- Occupation: Actress
- Years active: 2019–present

Natalee Linez is an American actress. She is best known for playing Lydia Montgomery in the drama series Tell Me Lies and Jessica Figueroa in the crime drama series Power Book III: Raising Kanan.

== Early life ==
Linez was born in Orange County, California. She dreamt of becoming an actor at the age of six and wrote Jim Carrey a letter asking to be in Ace Ventura: Pet Detective. She worked as a bagger at Albertsons in Ladera Ranch before moving to Los Angeles at the age of 20.

== Career ==
Linez's first big role came playing Nicole Martinez in the fantasy drama series Siren. She also had a leading role in the drama series Tell Me Lies playing Lydia Montgomery. Her biggest role so far has been playing Jessica Figueroa in the crime series Power Book III: Raising Kanan. She is currently cast in the spy drama series called CIA.

== Personal life ==
In her spare time her hobbies and interests include strength training, which she considers a passion and a job, golf and spending time at coffee shops.

== Filmography ==
=== Film ===
Year	Title	Role	Notes
2019	The Ladies Room	Ms. 18	Short
2021	Natural Disaster	Casey	
2021	The Match	Ari	Short
2024	Blood, Beach, Betrayal	Abby	

=== Television ===
Year	Title	Role	Notes
2019	Hawaii Five-0	Lindsey	Episode: "Hana Mao 'ole ka ua o Waianae"
2019	Siren	Nicole Martinez	Supporting role; 12 episodes
2021–2022	The Good Doctor	Alma Garcia	2 episodes
2022	9-1-1	Felisa Valdez	Episode: "Cursed"
2023	CSI: Vegas	Autumn Skye	Episode: "Shell Game"
2024	NCIS: Hawaiʻi	Gina Martinez	Episode: "License to Thrill"
2022–2024	Tell Me Lies	Lydia Montgomery	7 episodes
2024–2025	Chicago P.D.	Valeria Soto	3 episodes
2021–2026	Power Book III: Raising Kanan	Jessica Figueroa	14 episodes
2026–present	CIA	Gina Gosian	Main role
