= FBI: Most Wanted =

American television series (2020–2025)

- Genre: Crime drama; Police procedural; Action
- Created by: René Balcer
- Based on: FBI by Dick Wolf & Craig Turk
- Starring: Julian McMahon; Kellan Lutz; Roxy Sternberg; Keisha Castle-Hughes; Nathaniel Arcand; YaYa Gosselin; Miguel Gomez; Alexa Davalos; Dylan McDermott; Edwin Hodge; Shantel VanSanten
- Composer: Atli Örvarsson
- Country of origin: United States
- Original language: English
- No. of seasons: 6
- No. of episodes: 108 (list of episodes)

Production
- Executive producers: Dick Wolf; René Balcer; Arthur W. Forney; Peter Jankowski; Dylan McDermott
- Camera setup: Single-camera
- Running time: 45 minutes
- Production companies: Wolf Entertainment; CBS Studios (Note: Known as CBS Television Studios for season 1); Universal Television

Original release
- Network: CBS
- Release: January 7, 2020 – May 20, 2025

Related
- FBI; FBI: International; CIA

FBI: Most Wanted is an American police procedural television series created by René Balcer and produced by Wolf Entertainment that was ordered to series by CBS in May 2019, and premiered on January 7, 2020. The series follows the exploits of the Fugitive Task Force of the Federal Bureau of Investigation (FBI). It is the first spin-off of Dick Wolf's FBI, and the second series in the FBI franchise.

FBI: Most Wanted and its characters were introduced via a back-door pilot episode titled "Most Wanted" in the first season of FBI. The series originally starred Julian McMahon, Kellan Lutz, Roxy Sternberg, Keisha Castle-Hughes, and Nathaniel Arcand. Other cast members included YaYa Gosselin, Miguel Gomez, Alexa Davalos, Dylan McDermott, Edwin Hodge, and Shantel VanSanten.

In April 2024, the series was renewed for a sixth season which premiered on October 15, 2024. In March 2025, the series was canceled after six seasons.

== Premise ==
The series focuses on the work of Federal Bureau of Investigation (FBI)'s New York Fugitive Task Force (FTF), which relentlessly tracks and captures the notorious and dangerous criminals on the FBI's Most Wanted list. Overseeing the team is FBI Supervisory Special Agent Jess LaCroix, a seasoned, enigmatic agent at the top of his game who uses his expert profiling skills to help apprehend the most dangerous criminals. Throughout Season 1, the task force includes Special Agents Sheryll Barnes, an ex–New York Police Department detective with a degree in behavioral psych who serves as the team's second in command; Kenny Crosby, a United States Army Military Intelligence vet Jess has taken under his wing; Hana Gibson, the team's intelligence analyst; and Clinton Skye, one of the most experienced field agents on the team, and the brother of Jess's deceased wife, as well as Jess's brother-in-law with Clinton, and also the team's sharpshooter or sniper. The team also operates out of an area in 26 Fed in Manhattan or in an unidentified building that is under the control of the FBI. While on the road investigating cases, they also operate from a mobile command center that serves as their main base of operations.

In season 2, Skye is put on special assignment to the Bureau of Indian Affairs and is eventually replaced by Special Agent Ivan Ortiz, an ex–Los Angeles Police Department gang officer with street cop instincts while Crosby replaces Skye as the team's sniper/sharpshooter. In the season 3 premiere, Crosby is put on medical leave (after being wounded by a former Army comrade during an investigation, Crosby having assisted FBI agents Maggie Bell and OA Zidan) and leaves, returning to Oklahoma. He is replaced by Special Agent Kristin Gaines, a rising star from the FBI's Miami field office. Later, in the second half of the season, LaCroix is shot in the neck and killed by a fugitive, which devastates the rest of the team. He is eventually replaced by Supervisory Special Agent Remy Scott—fresh off a multi-year stint with the FBI's Las Vegas field team—as team leader. Near the end of the season, Ortiz takes time away from the task force to care for his ailing father in Los Angeles. By season 4, he has transferred back to Los Angeles permanently to continue taking care of his father and is soon replaced by rookie Special Agent Ray Cannon, a New Orleans native who is also an ex–New Orleans Police Department detective whose father was part of the bureau.

Between seasons 4 and 5, Gaines transfers to Denver to be near her children, and Special Agent Nina Chase from the New York Field Office takes her place on the team.

== Cast ==
Main cast of FBI: Most Wanted as of Season 4.

=== Main ===
- Julian McMahon as Jess LaCroix, (seasons 1–3), FBI Supervisory Special Agent and Team Leader. He is the widower of deceased US Army Intelligence officer Angelyne Skye LaCroix and the father of Natalia "Tali" Skye LaCroix as well as the brother-in-law of FBI Special Agent Clinton Skye. He is also a profiler which he uses to get into the mindset of a criminal the team is chasing and determine their patterns of behavior. In the backdoor pilot episode, "Most Wanted", it is revealed that Jess worked alongside Jubal Valentine, the Assistant Special in Charge of the FBI's New York field office on the Haynes Spree Killer case. In season 3, Jess is shot in the neck by a violent fugitive and, despite Barnes and Ortiz' attempts to treat him, dies off-screen from his wounds, devastating the team and his family. He was later replaced by special agent Remy Scott and after that is Sheryll Barnes.
- Kellan Lutz as Kenny Crosby, (seasons 1–3), FBI Special Agent and ex-Army Intelligence officer. Following the departure of FBI Special Agent Clinton Skye, Crosby becomes the team's newest sharpshooter/sniper. After being shot and left badly wounded during the FBI season 3 premiere, having assisted New York field agents Maggie Bell and OA Zidan on a case, Crosby survives and returns home to Oklahoma to begin a long process of recovery.
- Roxy Sternberg as Sheryll Barnes, FBI Special Agent and second in command of the Fugitive Task Force. She is also a former Detective with the New York Police Department and is married to Charlotte Gaines, a lawyer as well as the mother of their children, a girl named Anais and a boy named Theo. In season 4, it is revealed that Barnes has been a member of the Fugitive Task Force for ten years, making her the longest-serving member of the team. In season 5, Barnes and Charlotte go through marriage troubles, and eventually divorce, with the latter moving with their children to Washington D.C.
- Keisha Castle-Hughes as Hana Gibson, FBI Special Agent and Intelligence Analyst for the Team. She is also the team's hacker, often providing them with information they need on their latest case.
- Nathaniel Arcand as Clinton Skye (seasons 1–2), FBI Special Agent and LaCroix's brother-in-law. He is also the team's sniper/sharpshooter, providing them with cover in the event of a hostage situation and also has a Juris Doctor degree. He later leaves the team to go work on a case concerning public corruption which involves the FBI Director recruiting agents who have Juris Doctor degrees.
- YaYa Gosselin as Tali LaCroix (seasons 2–3; recurring season 1), daughter of Jess LaCroix and his wife, Angelyne and niece of Clinton Skye. Her full name is Natalia "Tali" Skye LaCroix. In season 3, she leaves her father's home to attend "Beersheba Springs", a full-time equestrian academy/boarding school located in Canada which also allows her to live close to her grandparents.
- Miguel Gomez as Ivan Ortiz (seasons 2–3), an FBI agent originally from Los Angeles and who worked with the FBI's counter-terrorism unit in Washington, D.C. before he became a member of the Fugitive Task Force. Prior to joining the FBI, Ortiz also worked as a Gang officer for the LAPD. Following the departure of FBI agent Kenny Crosby, Ortiz becomes the team's sniper. It is later revealed that Ortiz transferred back to Los Angeles on a permanent basis, resulting in him leaving the Fugitive Task Force so that he can continue looking after his ailing father while also working as an FBI agent.
- Alexa Davalos as Kristin Gaines (seasons 3–4), A former Office of Naval Intelligence officer and FBI Special Agent formerly with the Miami Field Office. She is the ex-wife of Nick Vargas and mother of their two children, Jack and Ingrid. After originally assisting the team on a case concerning a sex trafficking ring in the FBI season 4 premiere, Kristin officially joins the team, replacing an injured Crosby. At the beginning of season 5, it is revealed that Gaines transferred to Denver to be near her children who had recently moved to Colorado.
- Dylan McDermott as Remy Scott (season 3–6), FBI Supervisory Special Agent and Jess's replacement as Team Leader. He is the son of Betsy Scott and the brother of Claire and Mikey Scott. Remy initially has a rocky start with the task force, who are still grieving Jess, but eventually forms a friendly rapport with all of them, especially after they help him learn the truth behind his brother Mikey's murder in season 4. In the series finale, Remy retires from the FBI to open and run a restaurant with his girlfriend Abby.
- Edwin Hodge as Ray Cannon (season 4–6), FBI Special Agent and former NOPD junior detective as well as a New Orleans native who joins the Fugitive Task Force as the team's new sharpshooter/sniper. Cannon also attended Quantico and graduated at the top of his class as well as having worked at the FBI's Violent Crimes division in Albany prior to joining the Fugitive Task Force. He is the son of Ray Cannon Sr, a retired FBI agent, Cannon deciding to follow in his father's footsteps. At the end of season 5, he marries his girlfriend Cora Love, and becomes stepfather to her son Caleb. In the series finale, it is revealed that the two are expecting their own child together.
- Shantel VanSanten as Nina Chase (season 5–6; guest season 4) an FBI Special Agent who temporarily fills in for Maggie after she is exposed to sarin gas in the line of duty. She is also an undercover agent and is in a relationship with fellow FBI agent Stuart Scola and mother of their son, Douglas. Once Maggie returned to the team, Nina transferred to White Collar crimes division of the FBI and later transferred to the Fugitive Task Force, replacing Gaines.

=== Recurring ===
- Lorne Cardinal as Nelson Skye (seasons 1–2), father of Clinton Skye, father-in-law of Jess LaCroix and grandfather of Tali LaCroix.
- Irene Bedard as Marilou Skye (seasons 1–2), mother of Clinton Skye, mother-in-law of Jess LaCroix and grandmother of Tali LaCroix.
- Amy Carlson as Jackie Ward (season 2), veteran bounty hunter.
- Terry O'Quinn as Byron LaCroix (seasons 2–3), father of Jess LaCroix and grandfather of Tali LaCroix.
- Jen Landon as Sarah Allen (seasons 2–3), Jess's girlfriend.
- Matt Mercurio as George Kouka (season 3), half-brother of Hana Gibson

=== Notable guest stars ===
- Jen Jacob as Alice Thibodeaux (in "Derby Day")
- Henry Thomas as Dr. Justin Brock, Foot and Ankle Specialist (in "Dopesick").
- Joshua Malina as Paul Hayden, FBI Counterintelligence Agent (in "Silkworm").
- Chris Tardio as Mike Fitts, FBI Special Agent in Charge of the Indian Country Crime Unit (in "The Line").
- Victor Williams as Moses Reed, OIG Special Agent (in "Chattaboogie").
- Tim DeKay as Angelo Carpenter (in "Unhinged").
- Beshoy Mehany as Diego (in "Succession").
- Kristof Konrad as Aleksander Pavlishchev, Director of the Russian Consulate (in "A Man Without a Country").
- Isaiah Johnson as Shawn Odunze (in "Highway to Hell")

=== Crossover characters ===
- Missy Peregrym as FBI Special Agent Margaret "Maggie" Bell (FBI).
- Zeeko Zaki as FBI Special Agent Omar Adom "OA" Zidan (FBI).
- Ebonée Noel as FBI Special Agent Kristen Chazal (FBI).
- John Boyd as FBI Special Agent Stuart Scola (FBI).
- Alana de la Garza as FBI Special Agent in Charge Isobel Castile (FBI).
- Jeremy Sisto as FBI Assistant Special Agent in Charge Jubal Valentine (FBI).
- Luke Kleintank as FBI Supervisory Special Agent Scott Forrester (FBI: International).
- Katherine Renee Kane as FBI Special Agent Tiffany Wallace (FBI).

== Episodes ==
Season	Episodes	Originally released		Rank	Avg. viewership (in millions)
Season	Episodes	First released	Last released	Rank	Avg. viewership (in millions)
Backdoor pilot		April 2, 2019		—N/a	9.08
1	14	January 7, 2020	May 5, 2020	17	10.20
2	15	November 17, 2020	May 25, 2021	14	8.83
3	22	September 21, 2021	May 24, 2022	12	8.75
4	22	September 20, 2022	May 23, 2023	14	8.02
5	13	February 13, 2024	May 21, 2024	17	7.28
6	22	October 15, 2024	May 20, 2025	TBA	TBA

== Production ==
=== Development ===
On January 29, 2019, it was announced that CBS had commissioned a backdoor pilot with an attached series commitment for a potential spin-off series titled FBI: Most Wanted with the episode to air in the latter part of the first season. The series focuses on the division of the FBI tasked with tracking and capturing the most notorious criminals on the FBI's Most Wanted list. According to Dick Wolf, the spin-off is set to launch a series of interconnected shows similar to that both of Wolf's Chicago and Law & Order franchises on NBC. On May 9, 2019, CBS announced that FBI: Most Wanted had been ordered to series. A few days later, it was announced that the series would premiere as a mid-season replacement in the winter-spring of 2020. The series premiered on January 7, 2020. On March 13, 2020, it was announced that Universal Television has suspended the production due to the impact of the COVID-19 pandemic on television in the United States. They were filming episode 15, directed by Lexi Alexander. On May 6, 2020, CBS renewed the series for a second season, which premiered on November 17, 2020. On August 28, 2020, it was announced that showrunner René Balcer would be leaving the series and David Hudgins would be taking over for the second season.

On March 24, 2021, CBS announced that the series was renewed for a third season, which premiered on September 21, 2021.

On May 9, 2022, CBS renewed the series for a fourth and fifth season. The fourth season premiered on September 20, 2022. The fifth season premiered on February 13, 2024, a delay from September 2023 due to the WGA and SAG-AFTRA strikes. For the same reason, there are 13 episodes in the fifth season.

On April 9, 2024, CBS renewed the series for a sixth season which premiered on October 15, 2024. In July 2024, filming of campus climate protest scenes for the season six premiere at Queens College was interrupted by supporters of the 2024 pro-Palestinian protests on university campuses.

On March 4, 2025, CBS canceled the series after six seasons.

=== Casting ===
In February 2019, Julian McMahon was cast as Team Leader Jess LaCroix. McMahon stated that when he received the script for the series from CBS, he had an "aha moment" and knew he had to play the character. Kellan Lutz was cast six days later as Kenny Crosby. On October 28, 2020, Gosselin was promoted to series regular for the second season. On February 26, 2021, Miguel Gomez was cast as Ivan Ortiz. On July 12, 2021, Alexa Davalos was added to the main as Kristin Gaines.

Lutz left the main cast following the third season premiere. On January 22, 2022, it was announced that McMahon would be leaving the series during the third season. Two days later, Dylan McDermott was cast as Remy Scott, Jess LaCroix's replacement as team leader.

In June 2022, it was confirmed that Gomez had exited the series. On July 18, 2022, Edwin Hodge joined the main cast as Ray Cannon. Davalos left the main at the end of the fourth season. On December 18, 2023, FBI recurring cast member Shantel VanSanten was promoted to series regular for the fifth season.

== Release ==
=== Marketing ===
On May 15, 2019, CBS released the first official trailer for the series.

=== Broadcast ===
The show airs on Tuesday nights in Canada on Global and airs three hours ahead of CBS broadcast. The show airs on Friday nights at 10pm on Sky Witness in the United Kingdom. The show airs on Thursday night at 10:40pm on AXN Asia in the Southeast Asia, then moved to FOX Asia. Every episode of past seasons is available to stream on Peacock in the United States, while the current season is available to stream on Paramount+. In September 2026, NBCUniversal Syndication Studios begin to offer reruns of FBI: Most Wanted to local stations, along with Tuesday night airings on MyNetworkTV.

== Reception ==
Viewership and ratings per season of FBI: Most Wanted
Season	Timeslot (ET)	Episodes	First aired		Last aired		TV season	Viewership rank	Avg. viewers (millions)	18–49 rank	Avg. 18–49 rating
Season	Timeslot (ET)	Episodes	Date	Viewers (millions)	Date	Viewers (millions)	TV season	Viewership rank	Avg. viewers (millions)	18–49 rank	Avg. 18–49 rating
1	Tuesday 10:00 p.m. (Note: The eleventh episode of the first season as well as the season premiere and the ninth episode of the third season aired outside of their regular timeslot, at Tuesday 9:00 p.m.)	14	January 7, 2020	7.19	May 5, 2020	6.62	2019–20	17	10.20	39	1.2
2	Tuesday 10:00 p.m.	15	November 17, 2020	5.38	May 25, 2021	5.79	2020–21	14	8.83	34	1.0
3	Tuesday 10:00 p.m.	22	September 21, 2021	7.12	May 24, 2022	4.77	2021–22	12	8.75	28	0.9
4	Tuesday 10:00 p.m.	22	September 20, 2022	5.27	May 23, 2023	4.83	2022–23	14	8.02	48	0.6
5	Tuesday 10:00 p.m.	13	February 13, 2024	5.36	May 21, 2024	4.12	2023–24	18	7.38	TBD	TBD
6	Tuesday 10:00 p.m.	22	October 15, 2024	4.21	May 20, 2025	4.24	2024–25	TBD	TBD	TBD	TBD
