= Zeeko Zaki =

Egyptian-American actor (born 1990)

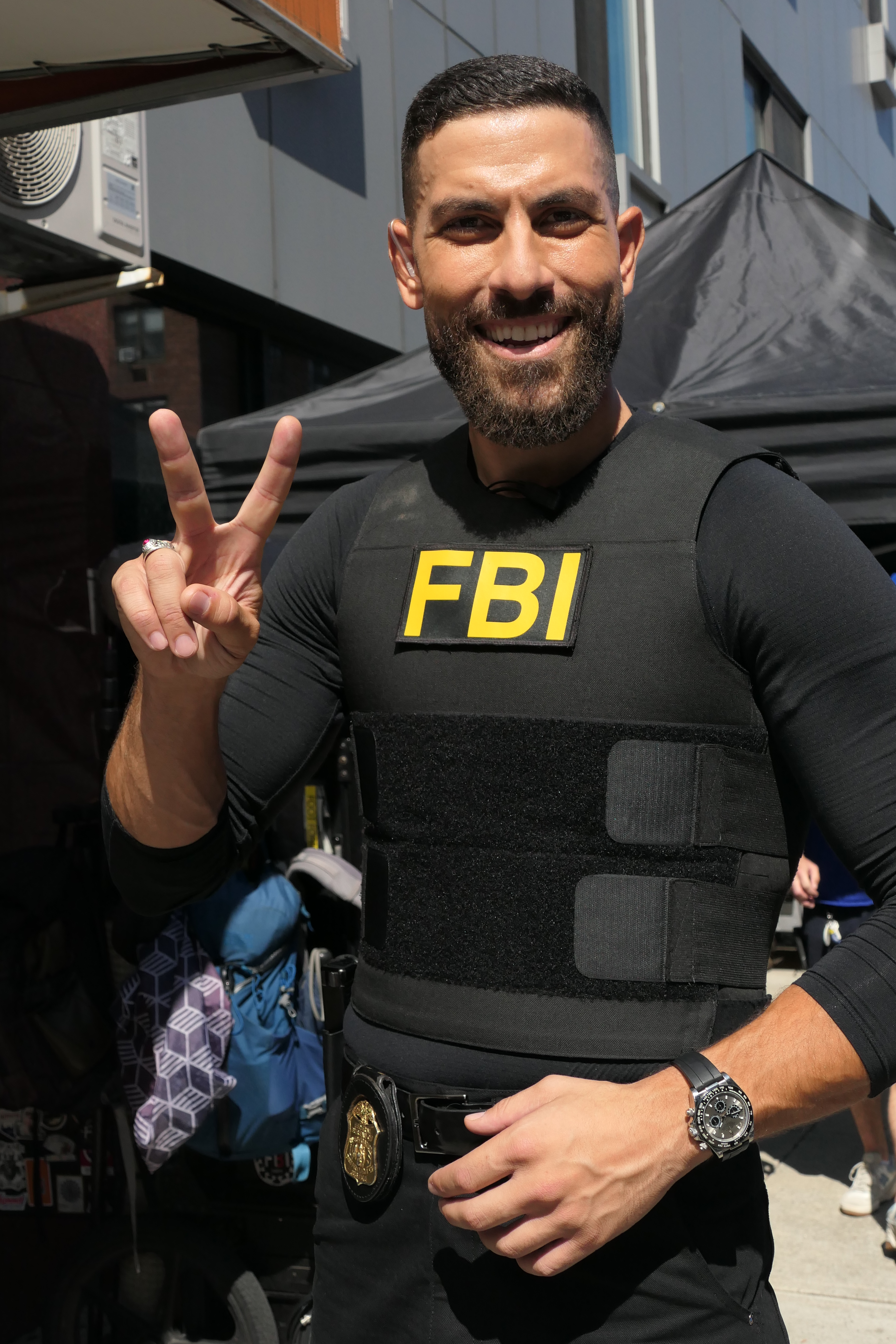
- Zaki in 2025 in Queens, New York City
- Born: Zakaria Sherif Zaki; January 18, 1990 (age 36); Alexandria, Egypt
- Education: Temple University
- Occupation: Actor
- Years active: 2012–present
- Notable work: FBI

Zakaria Sherif Zaki (Arabic: زكريا شريف زكي; born January 18, 1990), better known as Zeeko Zaki (Arabic: زيكو زكي), is an Egyptian-American actor best known for his role portraying Special Agent Omar Adom "OA" Zidan on the CBS television series FBI.

== Early life and education ==
Zaki was born in Alexandria, Egypt, and immigrated with his parents Eman and Sherif Zaki to the United States when he was one month old. Zaki's maternal grandparents immigrated to the U.S. before he and his parents arrived. His extended family remained in Egypt. During his childhood Zaki spent summers in his hometown, his aunt has a villa in Agami Region where he and his relatives gather. He grew up in West Chester, Pennsylvania. His mother manages a salon in Wilmington, Delaware, and his father is a stylist. Zaki has two younger siblings: a brother, Zeyad, and a sister, Zeina.

== Career ==
Zaki discovered a passion for acting during his freshman year high school performance of Seussical at Unionville High School. He also acted in the community theatre group Unionville Players. He briefly attended Temple University in Philadelphia.

In 2010, Zaki moved to North Carolina, where he worked in theater before auditioning for television roles. He appeared in bit part roles in various films and television series before landing recurring roles in Six and 24: Legacy, portraying antagonists, and in Valor, in which he portrayed a door gunner of a U.S. Army special operations aviation unit. Zaki was cast in his first lead role playing Special Agent Zidan in Dick Wolf's procedural show FBI. The role was originally written for a Latino actor but Wolf, impressed by Zaki's audition tape, changed the character's ethnicity to mirror Zaki's background.

Zaki has said that he wants to prove to the world that Muslims and Arabs are not terrorists.

== Personal life ==
Zaki is a Muslim. Zaki spoke Egyptian Arabic at home until the age of six.

== Filmography ==
=== Film ===
Year	Title	Role	Notes
2012	The Therapy Session	Michael	Short film
2012	Stuck in Love	Gus	
2013	Heart of the Country	Prisoner	
2013	McDuffy: The Urban Eagle	Chocolate Pretzel	Short film
2014	Tuesday	Andrew's friend	Short film
2015	Max	Afghan policeman	
2015	Alvin and the Chipmunks: The Road Chip	Paparazzo #2	
2016	The Divergent Series: Allegiant	Factionless squad leader	
2018	Escape Plan 2: Hades	MDLF soldier	
2022	Night at the Museum: Kahmunrah Rises Again	Ra the Sun God (voice)	

=== Television ===
Year	Title	Role	Notes
2012	Homeland	Sergeant	Episode: "State of Independence"
2012	Revolution	Militia Soldier	Uncredited; episode: "Nobody's Fault But Mine"
2013	Under the Dome	Customer #2	Episode: "The Fire"
2014	The Game	Cameron	Episode: "Chardonnay Goes Kissing"
2015	Satisfaction	Russell	2 episodes
2016	The Inspectors	Dario Resta	Episode: "The Return of Ronnie"
2017	Six	Akmal Barayev	8 episodes
2017	24: Legacy	Hamid	7 episodes
2017	NCIS: Los Angeles	Aimon Shah	2 episodes
2017	The Night Shift	Duke	2 episodes
2017	Daytime Divas	Cab driver	Episode: "Truth's a Mutha"
2017–2018	Valor	Staff Sergeant Matt Darzi	5 episodes
2018–present	FBI	FBI Special Agent Omar Adom ‘OA’ Zidan	Main role
2020–2023	FBI: Most Wanted	FBI Special Agent Omar Adom ‘OA’ Zidan	3 episodes
2021	FBI: International	FBI Special Agent Omar Adom ‘OA’ Zidan	Episode: "Pilot"
