= Ebonée Noel =

Guyanese American actress (born 1990)

- Born: May 25, 1990 (age 36)
- Occupation: Actress
- Known for: Long Nights Short Mornings (2016), I Love You, Daddy (2017)

Ebonée Reigne Noel (born May 25, 1990) is an American actress. She is known for her role as Special Agent Kristen Chazal in the CBS series FBI.

== Early life ==
Ebonée Reigne Noel was born May 25, 1990, to Cheryl E. Noel and Patrick Wharton. Her parents are both Guyanese. Noel travelled with her mother, who worked in numerous countries for the United Nations. Noel's grandfather was Frank Noel, once permanent secretary of the Guyanese Ministry of Trade. Noel went to school in various countries but graduated with a degree in Fine Arts from the New York University Tisch School of the Arts.

== Career ==
Her television debut was in 2014 on Law & Order: Special Victims Unit. In 2017, she starred in the Shonda Rhimes period drama series, Still Star-Crossed. The show was cancelled after a single season. She later appeared in Louis C.K.'s comedy-drama film I Love You, Daddy, and had a recurring role in the TBS sitcom Wrecked.

In 2018, Noel was cast in a series regular role of Special Agent Kristen Chazal in the CBS series, FBI. She left the series after two seasons. In 2022, she went to star in the Oprah Winfrey Network prime time soap opera, The Kings of Napa playing ambitious August King.

== Filmography ==
=== Film ===
| Year | Title | Role | Notes |
|---|---|---|---|
| 2013 | Product of My Environment | Nana | |
| 2014 | Tiny Things | Diana | Short film |
| 2016 | Long Nights Short Mornings | Sade | |
| 2017 | I Love You, Daddy | Zasha | |
| 2020 | BOGO | Dee | Short film |

=== Television ===
| Year | Title | Role | Notes |
|---|---|---|---|
| 2014 | Law & Order: Special Victims Unit | Ashley Miller | Episode: "Pattern Seventeen" |
| 2015 | Eye Candy | Mary Robertson | Episode: "FYEO" |
| 2017 | Still Star-Crossed | Livia Capulet | Series regular, 7 episodes |
| 2017 | Wrecked | The Barracuda | Recurring role, 7 episodes |
| 2018 | Tremors | Zoe | Unsold TV pilot |
| 2018–2020 | FBI | Special Agent Kristen Chazal | Series regular, 41 episodes |
| 2020 | FBI: Most Wanted | Special Agent Kristen Chazal | Episode: "Reveille" |
| 2021 | Harlem | Melissa | Episode: "Five Years Ago" |
| 2022 | The Kings of Napa | August King | Series regular |
