= Roxy Sternberg =

British actress (born 1989)

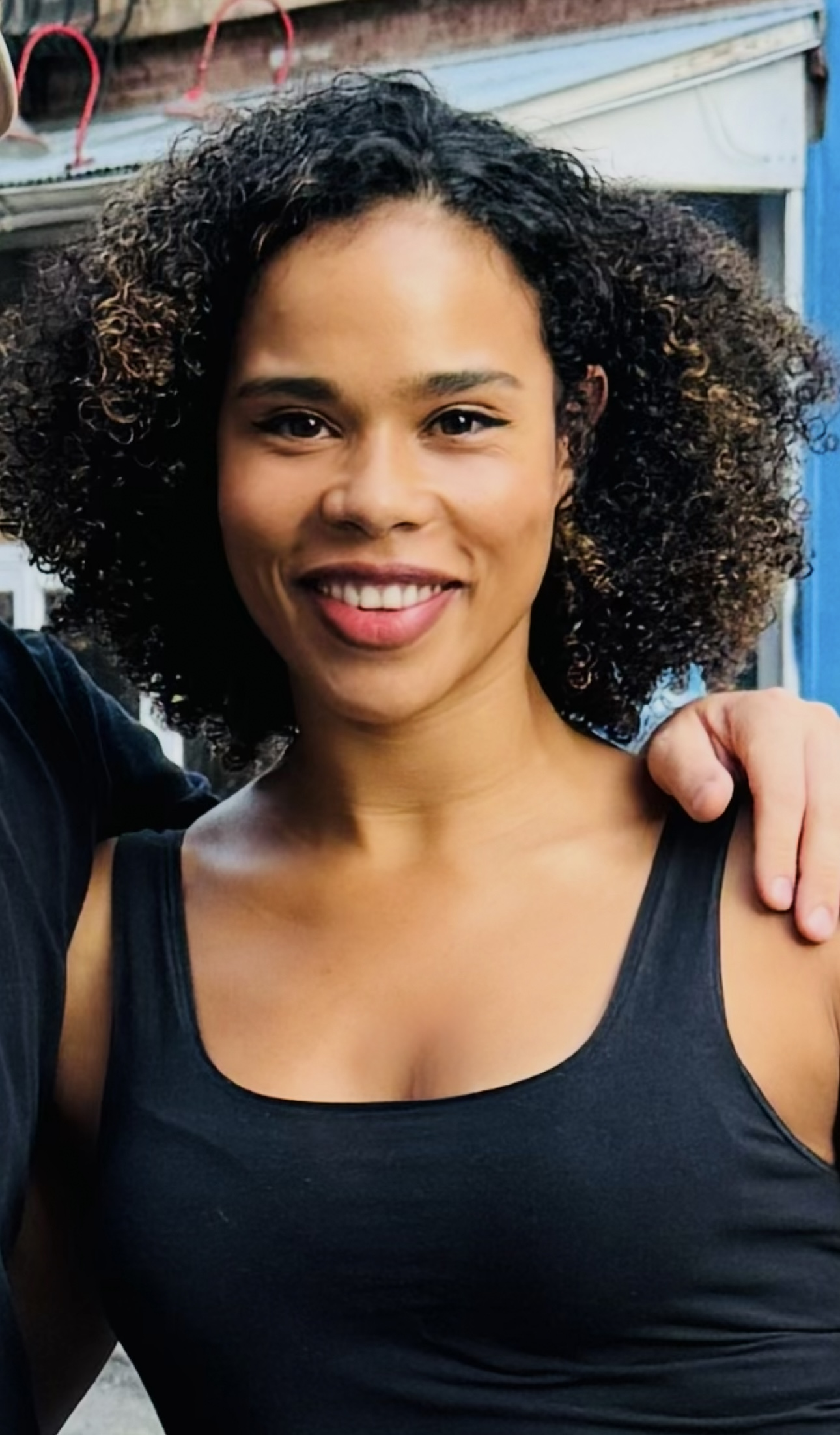
- Born: 21 April 1989 (age 37); Hammersmith, London, England
- Education: Royal Holloway, University of London
- Years active: 2012–present

Roxy Sternberg (born 21 April 1989) is a British actress who currently lives in Brooklyn. She is known for her roles in FBI: Most Wanted (2020–2025), Mars (2018), and BBC sketch show Famalam (2018–2020).

== Early life ==
Sternberg was born in Hammersmith, West London to a Ugandan mother and an English-Jewish father, actor Ben Sternberg of Polish and Russian descent. Sternberg graduated from Royal Holloway, University of London.

== Career ==
Sternberg starred in BBC sketch show Famalam, which was nominated for a Royal Television Society’s scripted comedy award (2019). She was a series regular in NBC’s Emerald City, National Geographic’s Mars (2016), and Absentia (2017) on Amazon Prime.

== Filmography ==
Year	Film	Role	Notes
2012	Meeting Place	Olu	
2012	Pini	Cassandra	TV Series
2012	The Writer's Circle	Alexandra	Short film
2013	PhoneShop	Monique	TV Series
2013	It's a Lot	Chrissy	
2013	The Tunnel	English Journalist 2	TV Series
2013–2014	Law & Order: UK	Alice Edwards	
2014	The Seventeenth Kind	Kate	Short film
2013–2014	Badults	Girl in Flat 17 - Giff	TV Series
2014	Mount Pleasant	Caroline	TV Series
2015	Chewing Gum	Meisha	TV Series
2016	Siblings	Amy	TV Series
2017	Emerald City	Elizabeth	TV Series
2017	Into the Badlands	Ravel	TV Series
2017	Zapped	Helena	TV Series
2018	Mars	Jen Carson	TV Series
2019	The Athena	Tamara Yorke	TV Series
2019	Absentia	Erica Lyle	TV Series
2018–2020	Famalam	Various	TV Series
2019–2023	FBI	FBI SA Sheryll Barnes	TV Series
2020–2025	FBI: Most Wanted	FBI SA Sheryll Barnes	TV Series
