= Vidotto =

Vidotto is a surname. Notable people with the surname include:

- Francesca Vidotto (born 1980), Italian theoretical physicist
- Matheus Vidotto (born 1993), Brazilian footballer
- Vinessa Vidotto (born 1995), American actress
- Vittorio Vidotto (1941–2024), Italian historian
