= Sabbatucci =

Sabbatucci is an Italian surname. Notable people with the surname include:

- Giovanni Sabbatucci (1944–2024), Italian historian and journalist
- Vin Sabbatucci (1935–2007), Australian footballer
