= Cammoro =

- Frazione
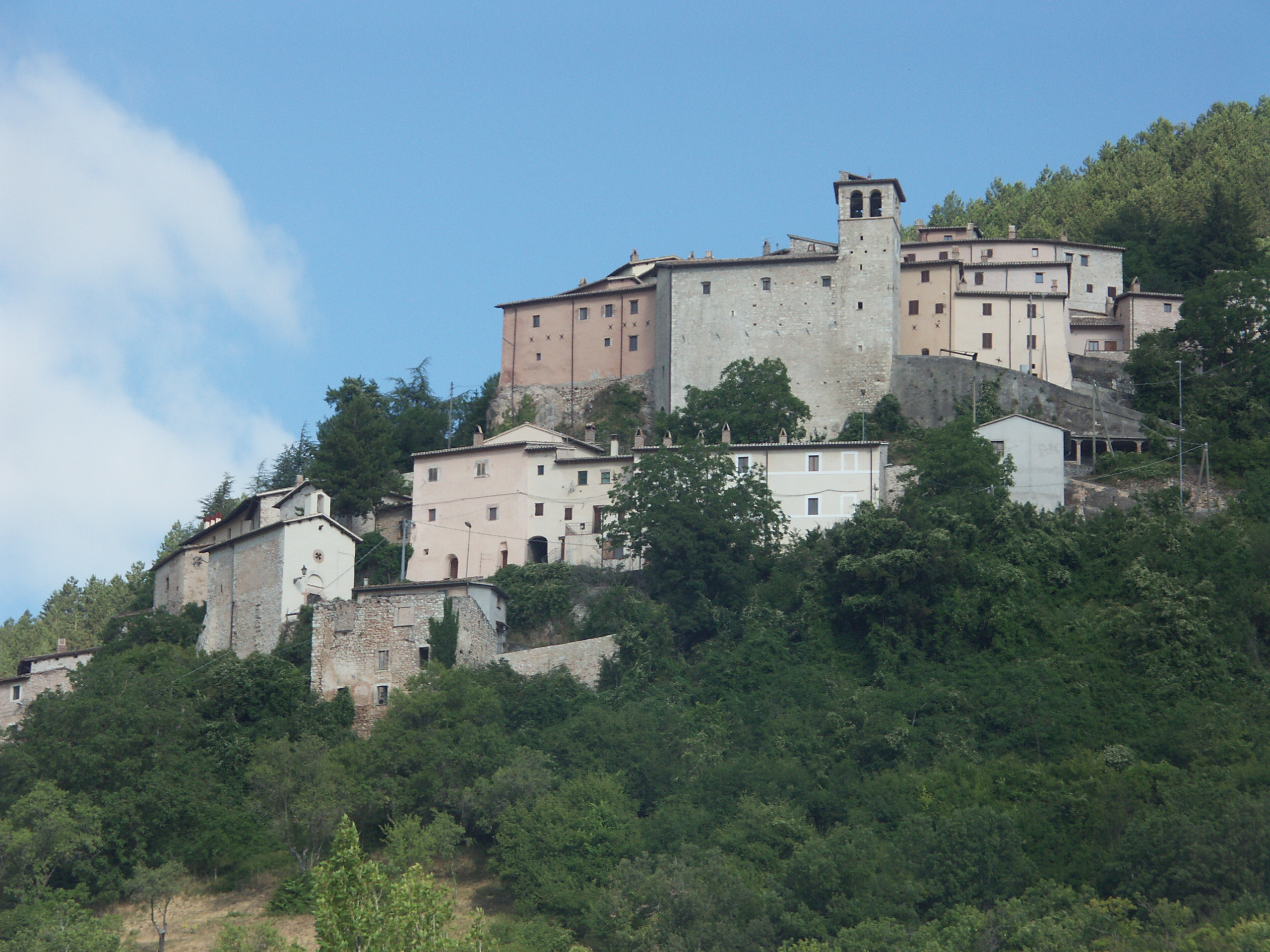
- Cammoro

- Location of Cammoro in Italy
- Coordinates: 42°54′N 12°51′E
- Country: Italy
- Region: Umbria
- Province: Perugia
- Comune: Sellano
- Elevation: 968 m (3,176 ft)

Population (2001)
  - Total: 17
- Time zone: UTC+1 (CET)
  - Summer (DST): UTC+2 (CEST)

Cammoro is a frazione of the comune of Sellano, in the province of Perugia, Umbria, central Italy.

At an elevation of 958 m, Cammoro is a medieval burgh (known at the times as Castrum Cammori) located on the same name mount, between Foligno, Spoleto and Norcia. In 2001 it had 17 inhabitants, much of the population having fled after the earthquake of September 26, 1997.

The burgh has a castle built across the 13th-14th centuries. Within the castle, there is the hanging church of Santa Maria Novella. Additionally, there is the Romanesque church of San Paterniano.

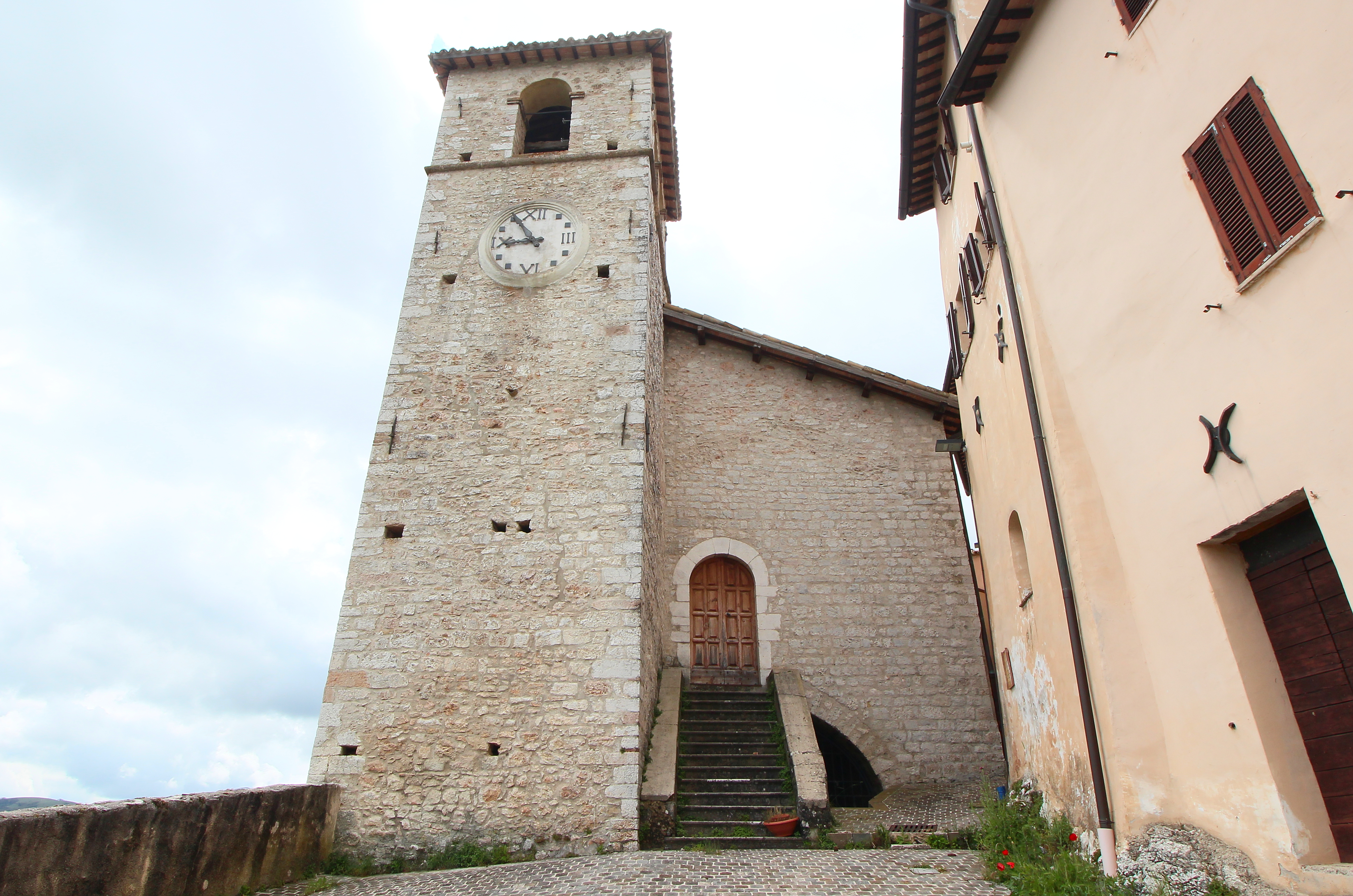
Santa Maria Novella

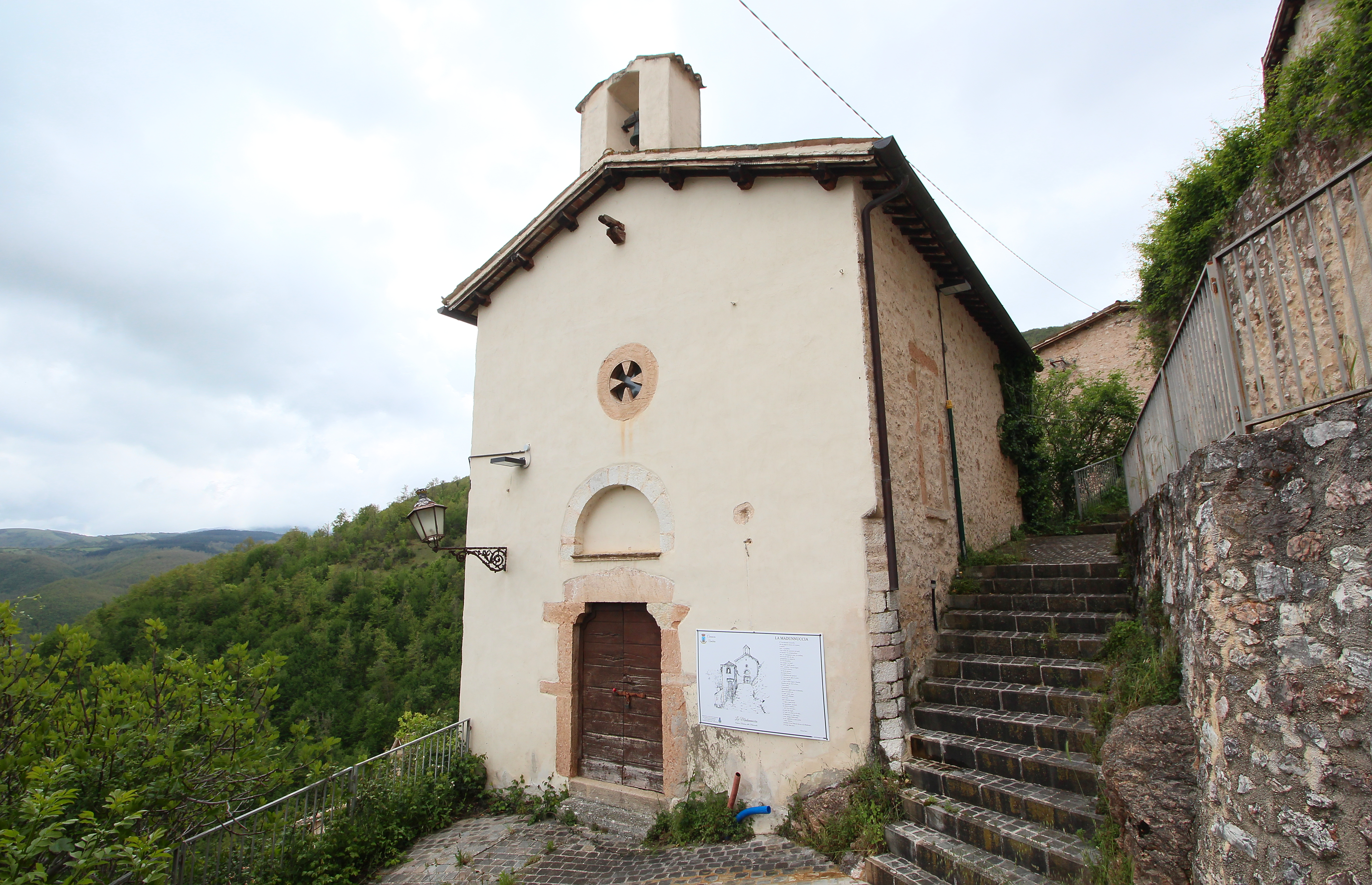
Madonna del Rosario

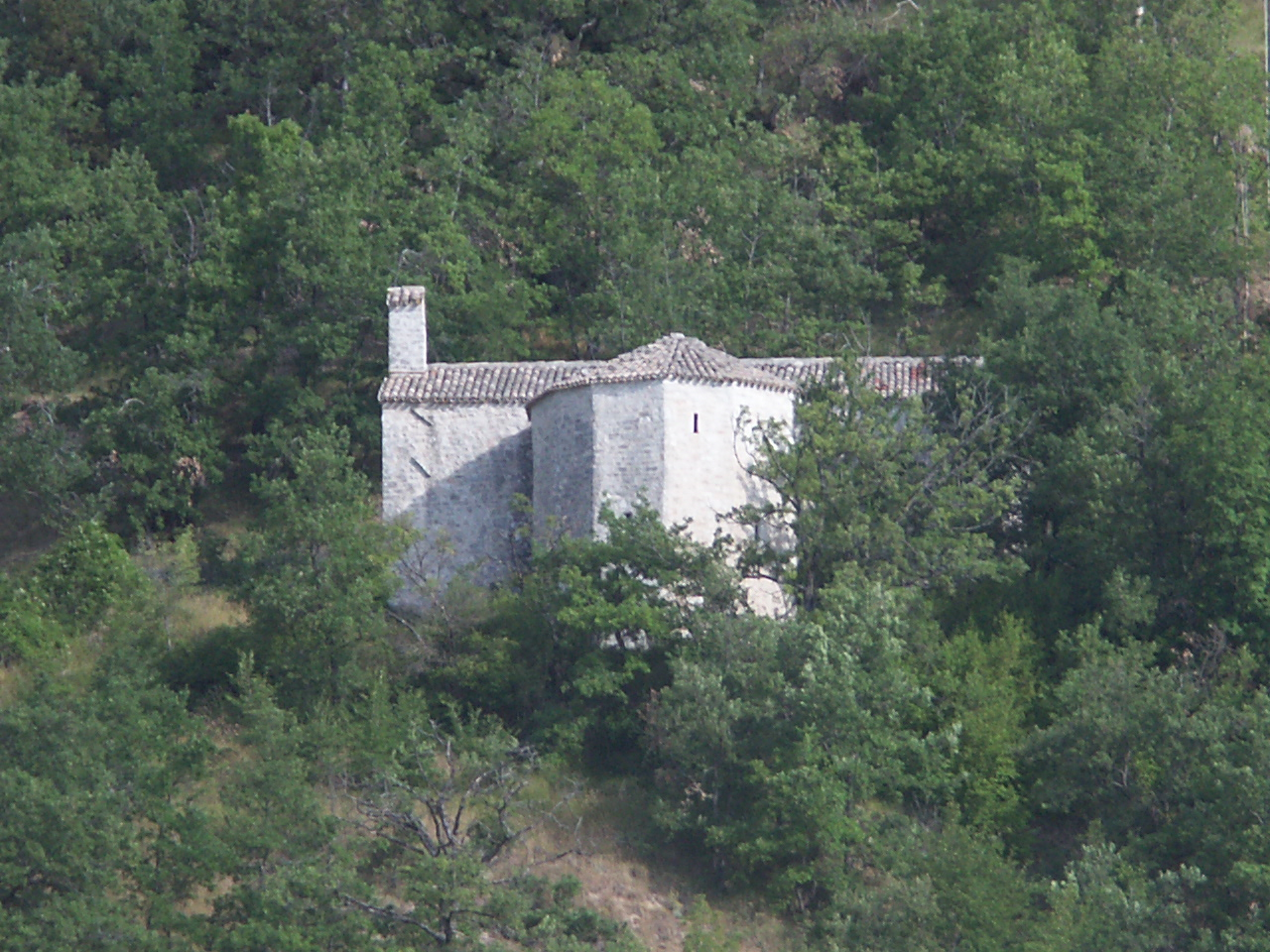
Santa Lucia
