= Editori Laterza =

Italian publishing company

Gius. Laterza & Figli
- Type: Società per azioni
- Industry: Publishing
- Founded: 1901 in Bari, Italy
- Founder: Giuseppe Laterza, Alessandro Laterza
- Headquarters: Rome-Bari, Italy
- Number of employees: 65 (2010)
- Website: www.laterza.it

The Gius. Laterza & Figli, or Editori Laterza for short, is an Italian publishing house founded by Giovanni Laterza in Bari, Italy, in 1901.

== History ==
The publishing house was founded in Bari on 10 May 1901, in partnership with the brothers by Giovanni Laterza (1873-1943), who had already opened a bookshop in the Apulian capital in 1896. The name "Gius. Laterza & sons", in the name of his father, Giuseppe Laterza (1841–1914), originates from the stationery shop that Vito Laterza (1867–1935) had started in 1885 in Putignano.

Its history is linked to Benedetto Croce, the greatest exponent of idealist philosophical thought in Italy and one of the bulwarks of anti-fascism, who was a consultant for the publishing house for forty years, making use of the collaboration of young scholars and students including Luigi Russo, Guido De Ruggiero, and Giovanni Gentile, who within a few years would become leading figures in Italian culture. Croce published with Laterza almost all of his works and his journal (La Critica), and set the editorial line of the house right from the start; he wrote so in 1902to Giovanni Laterza: "I also think that you would do well to refrain at least for now from accepting books of novels, short stories and pleasant literature: and this in order to appear as a publisher with a specific physiognomy: that is, as a publisher of political, historical, artistic history books, of philosophy, [...] publisher of serious stuff". Among the prestigious collections by Laterzia inspired by Croce are the Biblioteca di cultura moderna, Classici della filosofia moderna, and the Scrittori d'Italia. The relationship between Croce and Laterza is now documented by an impressive correspondence in four volumes published by the same publishing house.

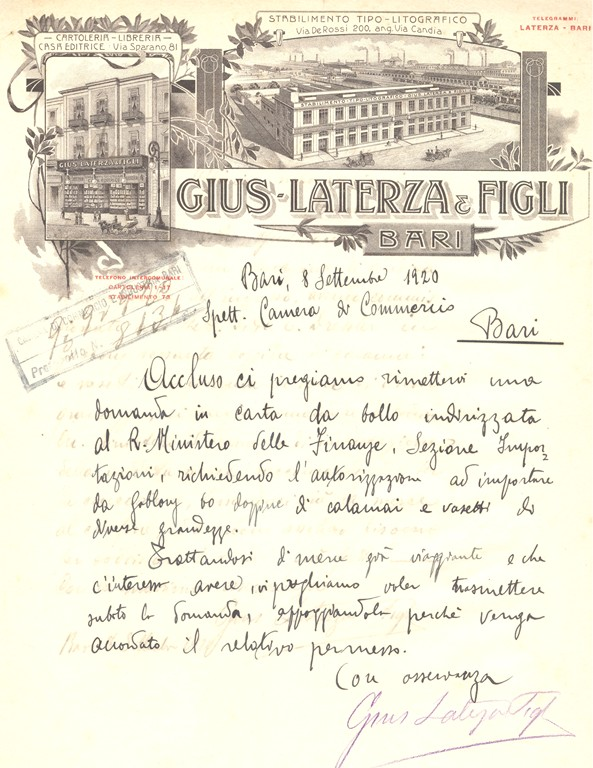
Commercial letter from the Bari company Giuseppe Laterza & Figli on headed paper reproducing the factory and shop, Bari 8 September 1920.

After World War II, the management of the publishing house passed into the hands of Vito Laterza (1926–2001), who progressively built a wider network of authors and interests around the publishing house. In 1951, coinciding with the fiftieth anniversary of the publishing house, a new series was launched, the Books of Time, which would be among the most influential in Italian culture in the second half of the twentieth century. In the 1960s, Laterza grew further, turning into a joint-stock company and opening an office in Rome, where Donato Barbone arrived from Bari, editorial director until 1968, who will leave the position to Enrico Mistretta, editorial director until 1992. Thus, a part of the activities moved to Rome, especially those of conception and more purely editorial ones, such as the relationship with consultants and the search for works to import from various Western countries. In 1964 the Universal Laterza series was born, which is proposed as a quality economic series, offering both classic texts and related non-fiction at an affordable price, in addition to the traditional fields of political history and philosophy, the new currents of literary criticism and historiography and the social sciences. In the following decade, the Universal Laterza was the publishing house's most successful series, with a circulation often exceeding ten thousand copies per title.

In the following years, the publishing offer expanded further, and authors gathered around the publishing house such as, among others, the linguist Tullio De Mauro, the historian of philosophy Tullio Gregory, the jurist Stefano Rodotà, and the economist Paolo Sylos Labini. In 1984 the Laterza Universal Library was dedicated to works on history and classics of philosophy. In the same years, the presence in the school and university sector was also strengthened.

Giuseppe Laterza in Trento for the 2009 Economics Festival, which the Laterza publishing house helped to organise. With the death of Vito Laterza, in 2001, the management of the publishing house passed to Giuseppe Laterza, who manages university publishing and non-fiction from Rome, and to his cousin Alessandro Laterza, who mainly manages school publishing from Bari.

In recent years, the publishing house's interest — always mainly linked to the humanistic sphere — has also been oriented towards new media, with the publication, among other things, of a series of manuals on the Internet edited by Marco Calvo, Fabio Ciotti, Gino Roncaglia and Marco Zela, and with the diffusion through podcasts of conferences, meetings and lessons held on the initiative of the publishing house. Among these, starting from 2006–2007, the conferences of the "Lessons of History" cycle, held in Rome at the Parco della Musica, and then also in Milan, Florence, Turin, and Genoa.

Since 2006 the publishing house has been a member of the promoting committee of the Trento Festival of Economics, and since 2008 of the Piacenza Festival of Law. In September 2014 he published the first book of Celacanto, a series dedicated to children aged 6 to 12. In May 2015 he introduced Lea - Libri e Altro, a platform for reading a selection of books from his catalog in streaming.

With the advent of the successful Contromano series, Laterza approaches narrative, a path that culminates in 2017 with the nomination for the Strega Prize of the novel The Deep Room by Vanni Santoni.

== Scholastic catalog ==
The publishing house has produced works for schools since its inception. In the 1950s, it published the Brief history of philosophy (1955–1957) by Guido De Ruggiero and Fabrizio Canfora, Italian literature for historically arranged essays by Croce (edited by Mario Sansone, 1956–1960), the Anthology of historical criticism (1957–1958) by Armando Saitta and the Introduction to the Constitution (1959) by Norberto Bobbio and Franco Pierandrei.

At the end of the 1960s, the "School Collection. New series" was published. Three titles require the presence of Laterza in secondary schools: Italian literature. With anthology of writers and critics (1969–1973) by Carlo Salinari and Carlo Ricci, which for the first time organically blends literary texts and historical-literary exposition; the Medieval, modern, contemporary history (1969–1970) by Rosario Villari, which, along the axis of political history, focuses attention on the social and economic scene; the history of philosophy (1973) by Francesco Adorno, Tullio Gregory, Valerio Verra, which proposes a systematic series of author's texts in support of the study of historical treatment.

Since the 1980s, Laterza has published works by Andrea Giardina, Giovanni Sabbatucci, Vittorio Vidotto, and has published in other fields, from philosophy to ancient languages and literature, from Italian literature to language education, from law to art history.

== See also ==
- Scrittori d'Italia Laterza

== Bibliography ==
- One hundred years of Laterza. 1885-1985. Testimonies of the authors, Rome-Bari, Laterza, 1985. ISBN 8842026018
- Laterza editions. Historical catalog 1901-2000, Rome-Bari, Laterza, 2001. ISBN 8842064173
- Benedetto Croce and Giovanni Laterza, Correspondence, 4 volumes, Rome-Bari, Laterza, 2004-2009.

== Laterza family tree ==
Giuseppe; *1841 †1914
Vito; *1867 †1935	Giovanni; *1873 †1943	Luigi; *1875 †1927	Pasquale; *1870 †1953	Francesco; *1879 †1928
Giuseppe; *1899 †1960	Franco; *1910 †1981
Vito; *1926 †2001	Paolo (?); *1928 †2017
Federico Laterza; *1961	Alessandro; *1958
