= FBI: International season 2 =

Season of American television series

FBI: International
- Season 2
- FBI: International Season 2 poster
- Starring: Luke Kleintank; Heida Reed; Carter Redwood; Vinessa Vidotto; Eva-Jane Willis
- No. of episodes: 22

Release
- Original network: CBS
- Original release: September 20, 2022 – May 23, 2023

Season chronology
- ← Previous; Season 1 Next → Season 3

The second season of the American police procedural television series FBI: International premiered on September 20, 2022, on CBS, for the 2022–23 television season, and concluded on May 23, 2023. The season contained 22 episodes. Eva-Jane Willis joined the main cast as Megan "Smitty" Garrelson.

== Cast and characters ==
=== Main ===
- Luke Kleintank as Scott Forrester, an FBI Supervisory Special Agent and head of the International Fly Team.
- Heida Reed as Jamie Kellett, an FBI Special Agent who is the team's second-in-command.
- Carter Redwood as Andre Raines, an FBI Special Agent on the team, with a background in accounting.
- Vinessa Vidotto as Cameron Vo, an FBI Special Agent; she is a West Point graduate and is the team's newest member.
- Green as Tank, a black Giant Schnauzer trained in Schutzhund and retired cadaver dog that obeys Scott Forrester's commands.
- Eva-Jane Willis as Megan "Smitty" Garretson, a Europol agent and old acquaintance of Forrester assigned to replace Jaeger as the team's liaison.

=== Special guest stars ===
- Christiane Paul as Europol Agent Katrin Jaeger

=== Recurring ===
- Greg Hovanessian as Special Agent Damian Powell

=== Crossover characters ===
- Jeremy Sisto as Jubal Valentine, Assistant Special Agent in Charge in the FBI NYC Field Office (FBI)
- Alana de la Garza as Isobel Castile, Special Agent in Charge in the FBI NYC Field Office (FBI)
- R. Ward Duffy as Deputy Director John Leer (FBI)
- John Boyd as Stuart Scola, an FBI Special Agent from New York (FBI)
- Shantel VanSanten as Nina Chase, an FBI Special Agent (FBI)

== Episodes ==
| No. overall | No. in season | Title | Directed by | Written by | Original release date | Prod. code | U.S. viewers (millions) |
|---|---|---|---|---|---|---|---|
| 22 | 1 | "Unburdened" | Jonathan Brown | Derek Haas | September 20, 2022 | INT201 | 5.44 |
As the team meet their new Europol liaison officer, Megan "Smitty" Garretson, they find themselves deployed to Paris, France, when an American detective who was also assigned to a federal task force is murdered. They work with the DGSI who informs them that the task force was investigating an illegal weapons trafficking ring that span across Europe, the U.S. and the Middle East. Through multiple shell companies, they narrow their focus on an American middle man who supplied the weapons, and has recently ordered a truck of radioactive material to be hijacked. The hijackers are later found dead by radiation and they learn that it's going to be used for an attack in Paris by a government enforcer from a former French colony. The team utilises distraction tactics in order to subdue the enforcer and secure the radiation. Raines reconsiders his future career options and opts not to pursue management. The surviving brother that went after Pavel Novikoff, Vlad Pavlovic, tracks Forrester to Budapest, but is quickly recalled for his failed mission.: This episode marks the debut appearance of Eva-Jane Willis (Megan "Smitty" Garretson).
| 23 | 2 | "Don't Say Her Name Again" | Avi Youabian | Matt Olmstead | September 27, 2022 | INT202 | 5.88 |
As Budapest experiences a heatwave, the Fly Team investigate a local predator who has been targeting American girls. As soon as they get the case moving, one of the predator's victims, Charlotte Weston, arrives in Budapest and offers to help the team. But given that she is considered a minor in the US, her protective mother arrives soon after and effectively bars her from helping them, but Charlotte's continued insistence prevails. Tricking the predator with malware leads them to a bar, but he is not there. Raines searches the local proximity with the predator's description, but when they raid his home, his computer auto-deletes all its content via motion detection. Charlotte's correspondence remains their only pointer to him and they apprehend him at a bus station. He gives them the identities of multiple other predators in exchange for a sentence in Hungary. Kellett also opens up to Charlotte about her sister having been in a similar situation.
| 24 | 3 | "Money Is Meaningless" | Jonathan Brown | Wade McIntyre | October 4, 2022 | INT203 | 5.97 |
A protest group against rich people storm the mansion of Ronen Sofer in Mallorca, Spain, only to find the body of Emilia Sofer, his daughter-in-law. The Spanish police immediately suspects the protestors, but when the Fly Team join the investigation, they discover irregularities that implies poor police work and possible corruption. They learn that Sofer never owned the mansion due to being sanctioned internationally, but rather Emilia, and Forrester suspects he killed her to get it back. However, Sofer points to her accountant friend Brian Clark, who he suspects of having scammed her into selling the mansion. Irregularities detected also determines that the Spanish police held back on the timeline of Clark's alibi. Kellett and Clark fight but he manages to subdue him. Clark confesses to the murder and admits he tried to get Emilia's money in his own pockets. Forrester suspects that his neighbors' son is trying to tell him about possible family abuse.
| 25 | 4 | "Copper Pots and Daggers" | Avi Youabian | Roxanne Paredes | October 11, 2022 | INT204 | 6.15 |
Former Marine Emily Reid is detained at an airport in Istanbul, Turkey for illegally carrying antique items. The Fly Team arrive in Istanbul through back channels, and are faced with a reluctant Turkish police who are determined to pin everything on Reid. The team quickly learn from surveillance cameras that Reid was scammed by airport police, but they also learn from Turkish police that she was a spy. The US embassy and General Finley informs that Reid is an alias and that she really is an NSA agent gathering intelligence in Turkey and had an informant she relied on. The Turkish police quickly arrest him, while the team work to break Reid out of the police station. In work with the embassy, Reid is brought back to Budapest by helicopter. The son of Forrester's neighbors tells him that his parents argue and he asks Kellett to do a background check on the father.
| 26 | 5 | "Yesterday's Miracle" | Attila Szalay | Hussain Pirani | October 18, 2022 | INT205 | 6.09 |
Dennis and Amy Palmer are apprehended by Romanian police in Bucharest after the former hits another man after learning that their surrogate mother Cosmina Dalca has gone missing before carrying their child to term. The Fly Team find Cosmina at a train station, but the baby missing. She claims she had a miscarriage and tried to leave the country. However, they find themselves gradually uncovering a conspiracy between Cosmina, the clinic director and a British couple, the husband who Dennis previously hit, to take the child from the Palmers, and they manage to stop the British couple before they can flee the country with the baby, who is biologically the Palmers'. Kellett's background check on Forrester's neighbors reveals that the father's repair shop acts as a front for a Balkan mafia and that he is not directly involved, but the repair shop is by force. The father also rejects Forrester's offer for help.
| 27 | 6 | "Call It Anarchy" | Milena Govich | Rachael Joyce | November 15, 2022 | INT206 | 5.51 |
Vo's friend and mentor Paige Taylor from the US Navy asks her to help her find her missing 16-year-old nephew Cody while deployed on Crete, Greece. Together with Kellett and Smitty, they work with the Hellenic Police and discover that Cody was kidnapped and possibly tortured by an anarchist group he joined and he later wanted to leave. They find him wandering beaten up in the old town and he points to an attack in Iraklion, which proves to be false. With pressure for a lie detector, Cody admits the real target is the military base. Together with the police and military personnel, the anarchists are apprehended, but they regardless cause damage to a gas tank. Vo arranges for Cody to be extradited to the US to serve time, which costs her friendship with Paige. In Budapest, Forrester confronts the Balkan mafia with incriminating evidence in order for them to leave his neighbors alone.
| 28 | 7 | "A Proven Liar" | Michael Katleman | Kristina Thomas | November 22, 2022 | INT207 | 5.82 |
Businessman Brent Remis' girlfriend and bodyguard are kidnapped in front of him in Barcelona, Spain. Initially the Fly Team and the Catalan police see him as the victim, but once they look through his company, they discover the lack of business activities which further leads them to his identity being fake and that he has a record to scam women for money in New York. Furthermore, one of his previous victims in Spain is revealed to the daughter of mafia boss Roberto de Gracia, who kidnapped his girlfriend in order to lure Remis out. He is shot when he delivers the ransom money, but survives thanks to a bulletproof vest, while de Gracia is killed. Meanwhile, Kellett, Smitty and the police free Remis' girlfriend. In Budapest, Forrester is summoned by Legat Dandridge who gives him documents for supervisory training, leaving the team confused. Raines finds himself growing closer to Maya, a woman who owns the bar the team regularly goes to.
| 29 | 8 | "Hail Mary" | Jen McGowan | Edgar Castillo | December 13, 2022 | INT208 | 5.41 |
Forrester is sent to a supervisor leadership course, leaving Kellett as acting team leader, all the while Dandridge demands more visibility in cases. Model Jocelyn Bell is thrown off a balcony in Milan, Italy, and the Italian police and prosecutor are quick to rule her death a suicide. The witness statement from fellow model Emma Staley becomes their only evidence against foul play, but it is dismissed after it is revealed she is bipolar and retracts her accounts of the events. Smitty tries hard to get a potential second witness to speak up, while Vo goes in undercover to get near businessman Walter Maldini to prove that he killed Bell and abused other models. However, her cover is blown when Maldini learns her identity through his lawyer. Smitty's gamble pays off and retrieves surveillance footage from the witness' balcony, proving once and for all that Maldini killed Bell.
| 30 | 9 | "Wheelman" | John Behring | Derek Haas | January 3, 2023 | INT209 | 5.48 |
Smitty and the Hungarian police apprehend art thief Daniel LaDee (Rico E. Anderson) who offers intel on another heist by long-wanted Michael Semien. Raines goes undercover to pose as a getaway driver and wins Semien's trust. However, the heist isn't happening in Budapest, but Antwerp, Belgium. A mole in the Belgian police informs Semien about the Europol-FBI operation and he kills his technician, suspecting him to be the mole. Raines takes on the dual role as his technician. After days of practice, the crew strikes their location, but Semien kills LaDee before leaving and has his enforcer fight Raines. He quickly overpowers him while the team and the police stop Semien. Forrester is tasked with analytical tasks in Warsaw and later confronts Dandridge about his recent assignments. Dandridge reveals his true motives: he thinks the Fly Team is incompetent and lacking, and is putting the blame on Forrester and as a result, has asked the deputy director to reassign him to Alabama.
| 31 | 10 | "BHITW" | Alex Zakrzewski | Matt Olmstead | January 10, 2023 | INT210 | 5.82 |
Derrin Vaughan, an American player with a Lithuanian basketball team, suffers cardiac arrest while out partying after a match in Belgrade, Serbia, while his teammate Bryan Moncrief is arrested for rushing to his aid. Serbian police prove unwilling to take much action due to the threat of mob involvement, but the Fly Team and Dandridge appointee Zoey McKenna convince them otherwise. When Vaughan dies and drugs that could increase his secret heart condition are discovered among Moncrief's belongings, he claims he was framed. The team's Swiss assistant coach is brought in for his accessibility to the drug used, and it is revealed he conspired with a Slovenian player who was eyeing for Vaughan's spot and pinned it on Moncrief. Moncrief is released and inspires Forrester to stand up to Dandridge and not give up his position without a fight.
| 32 | 11 | "Someone She Knew" | Jonathan Brown | Roxanne Paredes | January 24, 2023 | INT211 | 6.06 |
Katie Walsh, a teenager who had been missing since 2012 in Minnesota reappears in Austria seeking help, but disappears again. The Fly Team are surprised when her parents offer to help find her, while Dandridge towers over the investigation and makes erratic moves much to Forrester's chagrin. The stepfather, who worked with the Minneapolis PD looking for Katie, offers valuable insight which points them to her abductor, Otto Lang. Surveillance footage from a motel identifies a second victim, and Dandridge orders a raid on a departing train, while Forrester pursues a lead about Lang's deceased mother. He finds the girls on the aunt's house boat and fights Lang before he is subsequently arrested. The senator from Minnesota and the deputy director arrive in person to congratulate the team, while Dandridge is fired for illegally wiretapping Forrester's phone and McKenna is reassigned to Poland.
| 33 | 12 | "Glimmers and Ghosts" | Kevin Dowling | Edgar Castillo | February 14, 2023 | INT212 | 5.49 |
The Fly Team are reunited with Katrin Jaeger when they join her in Berlin, Germany, to investigate the death of German elder Tobias Ganz, who according to a recording, was killed by an American, later identified as Paul Kennard. Kennard was adopted to the US from East Germany and has gone after former Stasi secret agents from the top elite Indigo squad, where Ganz was the second-in-command, who were responsible for his parents' death. They learn from Jaeger's mentor Simon Ballack that both deaths were staged. Kennard fails to kill another former agent, accidentally killing his wife instead. With only the Indigo director left, the team and German police race to identify them before Kennard can get to him, only to learn that it is Ballack. He tries to kill himself, but the unloaded gun prevents this. The team withholds that Kennard's parents were defected Stasi spies for his own safety. Jaeger finds herself struggling with her past growing up in East Germany, but finally puts it to rest when learning the truth about Ballack.: This episode marks a guest appearance from Christiane Paul (Katrin Jaeger).
| 34 | 13 | "Indefensible" | Alex Zakrzewski | Hussain Pirani | February 21, 2023 | INT213 | 5.22 |
Lawyer Neil Cobb dies in a car bomb in Budapest, and the Fly Team and the Hungarian police suspect that his death was related to a lawsuit where he represented a company being sued for chemical damages to their workers. One of the plaintiffs point them to documents Cobb had that points to an internal conspiracy and reveals that Cobb secretly aided them. However, further damning info about CEO Sam Gilroy and Cobb's friendship makes it obvious that he flipped to get back at Gilroy. Traffic cameras pick up another car that followed Cobb shortly before his death, which leads them to a Bulgarian hitman, who reveals that the plaintiffs' attorney hired him to kill Cobb so he could pay off a debt to the mob. Kellett begins to grow close to HNP lieutenant Benedek "Ben" Erdos.
| 35 | 14 | "He Who Speaks Dies" | Deborah Kampmeier | Rachael Joyce | February 28, 2023 | INT214 | 5.55 |
A bomb threat is declared on a plane from New York to Athens, forcing it to make an emergency landing in Morocco. The Fly Team arrive and investigate alongside the Moroccan police, and learn that the threat was a ruse for the mafia to kidnap DEA agent Mike Kemp, who was onboard. Vo learns that an Air Marshal onboard was blackmailed by a member of the mafia to subdue Kemp before he was abducted by disguised medics. The middleman refuses to cooperate initially until Raines gives him one last chance, which leads them to a mafia convoy, which they and the police intercept and find and free Kemp. The DEA sends him and his son back to New York upon his reassignment being approved. Back in Budapest, Kellett and Erdos' relationship grow intimate, and he invites her home to cook.
| 36 | 15 | "Trust" | Nina Lopez-Corrado | Derek Haas | March 14, 2023 | INT215 | 5.54 |
A Hungarian couple is shot dead in their doorway by a police officer, and the Hungarian police seeks the assistance of the Fly Team on the case. Nearby surveillance footage incriminates Kellett's boyfriend Ben Erdos, putting him at the crime scene shortly after the murders. With Vo leading the investigation for the Fly Team, she has Kellett work in secret under the guise of being removed due to a conflict of interest. In confidence, Erdos reveals that he stored evidence in a private digital folder about possible corruption linking in a mafia and the contract for a new stadium. Further details suggests that someone in the HNP is on the mafia's payroll. Not long after the discovery of another body, they deduce that Erdos's partner David was on their payroll and had attempted to frame Erdos because he neared the truth and that the stadium contract should have gone to a mafia aligned bidder, even giving the mafia inside information concerning some raids the HNP were carrying out. Following the ordeal, Kellett breaks up with Erdos, noting that he didn't confide in her about his situation and that she believed his innocence.
| 37 | 16 | "Imminent Threat—Part One" | Michael Katleman | Teleplay by : Wade McIntyre; Story by : Rick Eid & Wade McIntyre | April 4, 2023 | INT217 | 6.51 |
On the outskirts of Minsk, Belarus, General Stanislau Lenkov celebrates his daughter's wedding with his team and attempts to use the knife he and his wife had at their own wedding to cut the cake. However, a drone strike leaves Lenkov's team along with his daughter and a few wedding guests dead. Three months later, in Rome, Italy, American architect, David Laporta is kidnapped and his friend, Tommaso Costa is shot dead. The Fly Team travel to Rome to investigate with their efforts to get answers being stalled by Chief Inspector Grannó. The team are surprised when ASAC Jubal Valentine from the FBI's New York Field Office and Nina Chase arrive in Rome to help the team where they discover a second man, a Belarusian middleman who is later found dead. Jubal's impatience has him at loggerheads with Granno despite Smitty attempting to play peacemaker between the two. Scott and Jubal meet Pia Morgan, an officer with the CIA who reveals Lenkov is seeking revenge for the US for the drone strike that killed his team and daughter. Eventually, they learn of a residence and prepare to raid the house, only for Granno to withdraw his men. Despite that, the team press on, raiding the house although Forrester discovers Laporta is dead, having been tortured while outside, Vo and Nina chase after the last two gunmen but Nina is shot and wounded, ending the episode on a cliffhanger. Note : This episode begins a crossover event that continues on FBI season 5, episode 17 and concludes on FBI: Most Wanted season 4, episode 16. John Boyd (Stuart Scola), Shantel VanSanten (Nina Chase), Alana de la Garza (Isobel Castille) and Jeremy Sisto (Jubal Valentine) are credited as Special Guest Stars.
| 38 | 17 | "Jealous Mistress" | Eduardo Sanchez | Kristina Thomas | April 11, 2023 | INT216 | 5.79 |
Prima ballerina Nicolette Clark is attacked with acid after being given the lead role in a new performance in Vienna, Austria. The Fly Team aid the Austrian police and soon find themselves diving into the dark waters of the ballerina world, where they cross paths with Clark's ex-boyfriend Alva Boxer, who has a double role as a theatre board member and chief of staff in the Austrian Parliament. They learn he is working undercover on behalf of the Justice Ministry to stop bribes going through parliament, and that he may have ticked off Leon Oliver, a trade union leader with ties to the mafia. With evidence of acid chemicals in his house, an ensuing car chase leads to Oliver's arrest. Smitty meets her Russian contact, who informs that Vlad Pavlovic, whose brother Forrester killed in Croatia, is imprisoned in Russia. The two come to an agreement with exchange for peace for a Russian ballerina and an extended sentence for Pavlovic.
| 39 | 18 | "Blood Feud" | Avi Youabian | Hussain Pirani | April 18, 2023 | INT218 | 5.26 |
Vlad Pavlovic escapes prison in Russia with the help of an accomplice, a prison guard on his payroll, and makes his way to Budapest. Forrester meets Pavel Novikoff through the CIA, who reveals Pavlovic plans to seek revenge for the death of his brother. As the team prepare for Pavlovic's arrival, they learn that Novikoff has been playing both sides and begin to question his allegiance. The team and Hungarian police intercept the train Pavlovic arrives on, but he has already left. Forrester seeks out an old Bratva informant about potential ties Pavlovic could utilize, only to later find him dead. With the FSB also intervening to go after Novikoff, the team soon learns that Pavlovic has abducted Maya and the case becomes personal for Raines, but Forrester keeps him at bay in order to face Pavlovic himself. Meeting at an abandoned train yard, he fights Pavlovic until he stabs him and executes him before freeing Maya.
| 40 | 19 | "Dead Sprint" | Michael Katleman | Kyle Steinbach | April 25, 2023 | INT219 | 5.49 |
The Fly Team travels to Stockholm, Sweden, to assist Swedish police in investigating the death of Hugo Rojas at the hands of what seems to be local football hooligans. However, the circumstances quickly change when they discover that many of them are related to a ultranationalist group, the Norseman Brotherhood, who is only warming up with Rojas' murder in preparation for a larger attack. Forrester runs into a former acquaintance, Damian Powell, who is working undercover in the network, but quickly begins to have his doubts due to his longevity undercover. But Powell quickly leads them to the larger attack, which becomes a clash between the brotherhood and leftists. Powell is injured when the Swedish brotherhood leader, Einar Lindström, compromises him, but Forrester disarms him and calls an ambulance for Powell. Lindström is charged with Rojas' murder in exchange for intel on the Finnish leader. With Powell's assignment now completed, Forrester offers him a position with the Fly Team, which he accepts.
| 41 | 20 | "A Tradition of Secrets" | Attila Szalay | Wade McIntyre | May 9, 2023 | INT220 | 5.44 |
Philippe Morand steals a list of classified information about tax evaders from the Bank of Geneva in Switzerland, and the Fly Team work with the bank's prosecutor to capture Morand and stop the clients' names from being leaked. However, they quickly find themselves facing a hitman looking for Morand and the possibility of blocking out Europol on orders from the Attorney General. The situation becomes personal for Smitty since her brother Christopher is involved with the bank and is trying to protect their interests. The Fly Team find themselves investigating in the shadows to get Morand out of the bank's hands and upon capture, he demands a deal with the US government. However, his deal becomes impossible when Christopher decides to testify against the bank after Forrester frees him from the hitman, who is determined to most likely have been sent by the bank to silence Morand. Vo and Powell grow closer and ultimately become romantically involved.
| 42 | 21 | "Fed to the Sharks" | Loren Yaconelli | Roxanne Paredes | May 16, 2023 | INT221 | 5.47 |
Framework Hotels employee Alfonso Mendes is found dead washed up on the beach in Cascais, Portugal. The Fly Team works with Zoey McKenna and the Portuguese police and quickly find themselves investigating the wealthy Prescott family that owns the hotel chain. Gradually they discover a work environment with threats, late work hours, overworked employees and an affair between Alexis Prescott and Mendes. Portuguese police later arrest the health and safety inspector, Francis Crane, for possession of the murder weapon, a gun which was owned by Alexis. Raines discovers altered CCTV footage and a witness that puts Alexis to have killed Mendes. Crane is released, while Alexis is arrested for the second time before she can leave the country. It is also revealed that Mendes was going to leak proof of misconduct by the hotel chain which ultimately led to his murder. While she confesses to the murder, whoever planted the gun in Crane's safe remains a mystery, however the team suspect her father ordered someone to do so. Raines grows worried about Vo, but she assures him she is managing her newfound relationship with Powell.
| 43 | 22 | "Fencing the Mona Lisa" | Michael Katleman | Matt Olmstead & Edgar Castillo | May 23, 2023 | INT222 | 5.36 |
A nuclear rocket is stolen from a transporter on the Russian border. The case lands with the Fly Team, who race to prevent the rocket being sold through the black market. A longtime informant of Kellett identifies the buyer as Yusif Sydin, and further details leads them to the American middle person, Olivia Thornton. Using her family as leverage, she reveals that Maksim Kuzmin is the seller, but will only speak to her. Forrester and Raines pose as her detail to meet Sydin, but the team discovers they're being trapped, but manage to make it out. Sydin gradually agrees to cooperate. The team go through the tunnels of Budapest to find Kuzmin and secure the rocket, which is then handed to General Finley and the US Army. Kellett has her reservations about Powell's temper but is eventually proven otherwise when he saves her from a surviving gunman. As Thornton's transfer is arranged, Raines uncovers a van racing to the team's offices, which the others quickly register. But as he races back, a bomb goes off at the offices.

== Ratings ==
Viewership and ratings per episode of FBI: International season 2
| No. | Title | Air date | Rating (18–49) | Viewers (millions) | DVR (18–49) | DVR viewers (millions) | Total (18–49) | Total viewers (millions) |
|---|---|---|---|---|---|---|---|---|
| 1 | "Unburdened" | September 20, 2022 | 0.5 | 5.44 | 0.2 | 2.26 | 0.7 | 7.70 |
| 2 | "Don't Say Her Name Again" | September 27, 2022 | 0.5 | 5.88 | 0.2 | 2.03 | 0.6 | 7.91 |
| 3 | "Money Is Meaningless" | October 4, 2022 | 0.5 | 5.97 | 0.2 | 1.97 | 0.7 | 7.94 |
| 4 | "Copper Pots and Daggers" | October 11, 2022 | 0.4 | 6.15 | 0.2 | 1.93 | 0.6 | 8.07 |
| 5 | "Yesterday's Miracle" | October 18, 2022 | 0.5 | 6.09 | 0.2 | 1.99 | 0.9 | 8.08 |
| 6 | "Call It Anarchy" | November 15, 2022 | 0.4 | 5.51 | 0.2 | 2.04 | 0.6 | 7.55 |
| 7 | "A Proven Liar" | November 22, 2022 | 0.4 | 5.82 | —N/a | —N/a | —N/a | —N/a |
| 8 | "Hail Mary" | December 13, 2022 | 0.4 | 5.41 | —N/a | —N/a | —N/a | —N/a |
| 9 | "Wheelman" | January 3, 2023 | 0.4 | 5.48 | 0.2 | 2.15 | 0.6 | 7.63 |
| 10 | "BHITW" | January 10, 2023 | 0.5 | 5.82 | 0.2 | 2.06 | 0.7 | 7.87 |
| 11 | "Someone She Knew" | January 24, 2023 | 0.5 | 6.06 | —N/a | —N/a | —N/a | —N/a |
| 12 | "Glimmers and Ghosts" | February 14, 2023 | 0.4 | 5.49 | —N/a | —N/a | —N/a | —N/a |
| 13 | "Indefensible" | February 21, 2023 | 0.4 | 5.22 | —N/a | —N/a | —N/a | —N/a |
| 14 | "He Who Speaks Dies" | February 28, 2023 | 0.4 | 5.55 | —N/a | —N/a | —N/a | —N/a |
| 15 | "Trust" | March 14, 2023 | 0.3 | 5.54 | —N/a | —N/a | —N/a | —N/a |
| 16 | "Imminent Threat - Part One" | April 4, 2023 | 0.5 | 6.51 | —N/a | —N/a | —N/a | —N/a |
| 17 | "Jealous Mistress" | April 11, 2023 | 0.4 | 5.79 | —N/a | —N/a | —N/a | —N/a |
| 18 | "Blood Feud" | April 18, 2023 | 0.4 | 5.26 | —N/a | —N/a | —N/a | —N/a |
| 19 | "Dead Sprint" | April 25, 2023 | 0.4 | 5.49 | —N/a | —N/a | —N/a | —N/a |
| 20 | "A Tradition of Secrets" | May 9, 2023 | 0.3 | 5.44 | —N/a | —N/a | —N/a | —N/a |
| 21 | "Fed to the Sharks" | May 16, 2023 | 0.4 | 5.47 | —N/a | —N/a | —N/a | —N/a |
| 22 | "Fencing the Mona Lisa" | May 23, 2023 | 0.3 | 5.36 | —N/a | —N/a | —N/a | —N/a |
