= FBI: International season 1 =

Season of American television series

FBI: International
- Season 1
- FBI: International Season 1 poster
- Starring: Luke Kleintank; Heida Reed; Carter Redwood; Vinessa Vidotto; Christiane Paul
- No. of episodes: 21

Release
- Original network: CBS
- Original release: September 21, 2021 – May 24, 2022

Season chronology
- Next → Season 2

The first season of the American police procedural television series FBI: International premiered on September 21, 2021, on CBS, for the 2021–22 television season, and ended on May 24, 2022. The season premiered with a crossover event with FBI and fellow spin-off series FBI: Most Wanted. The season contained 21 episodes. It is the second spin-off from Dick Wolf's drama FBI. Christiane Paul departed at the end of the season as series regular.

== Cast and characters ==
=== Main ===
- Luke Kleintank as Supervisory Special Agent Scott Forrester
- Heida Reed as Special Agent Jamie Kellett
- Carter Redwood as Special Agent Andre Raines
- Vinessa Vidotto as Special Agent Cameron Vo
- Christiane Paul as Europol Agent Katrin Jaeger

=== Recurring ===
- Elizabeth Mitchell as Angela Cassidy
- Laila Drew as Jordan Raines
- Connor Price as Ethan Grubic
- Jay Paulson as Agent Harold Porter
- Tom Forbes as Nick Thorpe
- Katalin Ruzsik as Sára Szabó
- Christina Rouner as Julianne Kellett
- William Ludwig as Willem Smit
- Aaron Serotsky as Michael Rafferty
- Maurice Irvin as General Paul Finley

=== Crossover ===
- Missy Peregrym as Special Agent Maggie Bell (FBI)
- Zeeko Zaki as Special Agent Omar Adom "OA" Zidan (FBI)
- Alana de la Garza as Special Agent in Charge Isobel Castille (FBI)
- Jeremy Sisto as Assistant Special Agent in Charge Jubal Valentine (FBI)
- Julian McMahon as Supervisory Special Agent Jess LaCroix (FBI: Most Wanted)
- Kellan Lutz as Special Agent Kenny Crosby (FBI: Most Wanted)

== Episodes ==
No. overall	No. in season	Title	Directed by	Written by	Original release date	Prod. code	U.S. viewers (millions)
1	1	"Pilot"	Michael Katleman	Teleplay by : Derek Haas; Story by : Dick Wolf & Derek Haas	September 21, 2021	INT101	6.43
In Budapest, Hungary, a training scenario is going on between the Budapest police force and Special Agent Scott Forrester and his second-in-command, Jamie Kellet with Kellet receiving a phone call that abruptly ends the scenario, Kellet telling Scott a major operation's incoming. Meanwhile, at a tiny airfield outside Zagreb, Croatia, Colin Kent, the leader of the sex trafficking ring that the FBI New York FBI Field Office and Fugitive Task Force uncovered and investigated, the case originally beginning with the murder of a young woman, Nicole Wyatt on federal property, the Task Force just arriving seconds before Kent fled his mansion via a plane, leaving a trail of carnage including dead bodies of the local police officers and his men re-appears from a plane with his men and a girl named Sunny, his security guards attacking and killing two local guards, Kent telling the leader to put anyone else who attacks in the ground. At their HQ in downtown Budapest, the International Fly Team who are based in Budapest meet their newest member, agent Cameron Vo who Scott introduces to the team. Along with Scott, Kellet and Vo is Andre Raines and the team's dog, Tank who's trained to recover dead bodies. Thanks to Kellet, the team get a conference call from New York SAC Isobel Castille and ASAC Jubal Valentine, the two senior agents informing of Kent's actions and how he killed tender age girls, Isobel saying she cannot stress enough how badly she wants Kent in bracelets. The conference call over, the team travel to Zagreb to investigate and during the flight, reconnect with Jubal and the JOC techs Ian Lim and Kelly Moran who give them info on a new suspect they've found- Ivan Kuprevic, only to be stonewalled by the local police there although a Detective manages to work with them and even leads them to a local girl who was abused by members of the ring. OA Zidan of the New York's FBI field team who had investigated the original case right from the very beginning later arrives in Zagreb, intending to bring Kent back to the U.S. to face justice after his actions in New York left a girl, Julia Walcott OA had been searching for dead. He clashes with Scott who tells him about an operation he worked in the past in Izmir, Turkey where they kept eye on a middleman, using a lot of time and resources. The team lost their patience and arrested the man, placing him in a Turkish cell while the rocket launchers were later used in an attack on an open-market in Istanbul that left 27 people including three children dead. Scott tells OA that the material will wind up in someone else's hands and that they need to take everyone down or they might never get that opportunity again, highlighting the need to arrest other members of the ring outweighs OA's own personal grudge against Kent. Upon learning Kent intends to offer the information in exchange for safe passage to Ukraine, the team ambush the meeting and arrest Kent while his men are either arrested or shot dead. During the interrogation, Kent gleefully reveals he plans on staying in Croatia, only for Kellet to reveal that since he's a threat to the Croatian community given the list of charges against him, his hearing's been waived and he's going straight back to the U.S. with OA. With Kent in OA's custody, the two men head back to New York while the Fly team spend the night in Zagreb. The next day, in New York, OA visits Julia's mother, Andrea, informing her they got the man who ordered her daughter's murder much to Andrea's relief as she thanks OA while OA's field partner, Maggie Bell and Jess LaCroix, the SSA of the Fugitive Task Force reconcil after fighting over the incident that resulted in Kenny Crosby being shot and left badly wounded, Isobel and Jubal announce to the JOC that an operation has ended with the arrest and exposure of all the remaining members of the sex ring- all 28 of them, the JOC erupting in applause as Ian and Kelly shake hands while in Budapest, it's revealed that Forrester and Kellet are in a secret relationship.: Note: This episode concludes a crossover event that begins on the season 4 premiere of FBI and continues on the season 3 premiere of FBI: Most Wanted. Missy Peregrym (Maggie Bell), Zeeko Zaki (Omar Adom "OA" Zidan), Alana de la Garza (Isobel Castille), Jeremy Sisto (Jubal Valentine), Julian McMahon (Jess LaCroix) and Kellan Lutz (Kenny Crosby) are all credited as Special Guest Stars.; This episode marks the final appearance of Kellan Lutz (Kenny Crosby) from FBI: Most Wanted.
2	2	"The Edge"	Michael Katleman	Derek Haas	September 28, 2021	INT102	6.04
The team are tasked with serving a warrant against Katya Milgrava but things change after Scott and Kellet witness the abduction of her young son, David, in broad daylight in Budapest. Info from the New York Office reveal that the father, Gary Milgrave, is wanted for other crimes, and had hired a supposed Christian group from Australia to kidnap his son so he could be reunited with him in Budapest. The team and Jaeger stage a release for Gary after his arrival, before tracking him to the meet up place near a quarry. Forrester attempts to talk him down before he drives of the edge with the standoff complicating when David begins seizing. Gary's efforts to drive are stopped by Kellett who sideswipes his car. David gradually confirms that his father hit him after breaking a glass. Kellett's application to a position in New York is accepted, while Forrester hopes to eventually convince her to stay.: Jeremy Sisto (Jubal Valentine) is credited as a Special Guest Star.
3	3	"Secrets as Weapons"	Deborah Kampmeier	Matt Olmstead	October 5, 2021	INT103	6.08
When a couple of American private detectives are attacked on a road in Switzerland, the man being shot dead while the woman escapes but is left injured after falling down a cliff area during her escape, the team investigate and discover that the couple were carrying several cryptocurrency wallets to a Swiss vault for safekeeping, the owner being American billionaire Steve Webb. Jamie and her informant are attacked when she tries to receive intel about the perpetrators, with Jamie being left wounded and hospitalized while her informant is murdered. The case quickly turns personal for Scott, while the Fly Team also learns that Webb refuses to collaborate, as he's interested only in recovering his money. This leads to him and his head of security to negotiate the perpetrators' ransom themselves, but Scott and his team manage to capture the leader, Kristian Hess. In turn for his accomplice's name, he demands citizenship for his Turkish girlfriend and her son. After they capture the accomplice, Jamie makes a recovery and decides to remain with Scott and the Fly Team rather than moving back to New York.: Alana de la Garza (Isobel Castille) is credited as a Special Guest Star.
4	4	"American Optimism"	Deborah Kampmeier	Matt Olmstead	October 12, 2021	INT104	5.64
Drew Edmonson, an American citizen arrives at the U.S. Embassy in Madrid, Spain, claiming to be innocent despite being covered in the blood of his murdered Spanish boyfriend Rafael Delgado. The Fly Team investigate alongside the Spanish police, but quickly face resistance as they are convinced that Edmonson is responsible, a view also shared by the Delgado family. The embassy convinces Edmonson to surrender to the Spanish police, much to the team's frustration. Forrester speaks with the US ambassador, and convinces him to reappoint them to work with the Spaniards after they cease their cooperation. The case narrows down to Rafael's property development job, where he stole money from his boss through blackmail by Pedro Muñoz, and he was stabbed by him when he ceased their cooperation and came out to his parents before Muñoz could out him. Forrester relegates Jamie to desk duty so she can recover from her gunshot wound, while Raines and Vo's friendship develops.
5	5	"The Soul of Chess"	Alex Zakrzewski	Wade McIntyre	November 2, 2021	INT105	5.42
Journalist Philip Blake is poisoned while trying to meet with an anonymous source in Kraków, Poland. The Fly Team and Polish police's investigation quickly cross paths with the CIA, whose man in Krakow informs them that Blake worked on a story about super advanced Russian missile systems, which they suspect the Russians wants to keep under wraps. Jaeger pulls some strings with the Russian consulate in order to later work out a compromise resolution for both parties. Forrester's overprotectiveness of Kellett comes in the way when she volunteers to substitute for a Polish journalist in an attempt to lure out the anonymous source. Ultimately the source gets away, but leaves a flash drive with the necessary information, which Forrester later hands to the CIA. In return he receives a picture that proves his mother's whereabouts.
6	6	"The Secrets She Knows"	Anton Cropper	Brooke Roberts	November 9, 2021	INT106	5.59
U.S. intelligence negotiator Bridget Rapp disappears after being on a date in Paris, France, with her apartment being ransacked and her blood spilled. The Pentagon asks the Fly Team to investigate alongside Jaeger and the French police, racing to find her before the country's nuclear secrets fall into the hands of a foreign enemy. Scott finds himself realizing the case has certain parallels similar to his mother's disappearance. They learn that Rapp was romantically involved with the Iranian nuclear negotiator, who is later "reassigned" (presumably murdered) and replaced with a new negotiator and the two had planned to run away together. Her apartment crime scene was also staged, and her pattern of dramatic escapades leads them to a bridge, where Forrester and Kellett talk her down and save her from jumping. The Pentagon later warns Forrester to cease and desist from looking into his mother's whereabouts.
7	7	"Trying to Grab Smoke"	Alex Zakrzewski	Matt Olmstead	November 16, 2021	INT107	5.96
Lloyd Eckersley, an American founder of an illegal adult-only site is murdered in Prague, Czech Republic, while filming. The Fly Team and the Czech police race to find the website's co-founder, Fred Dobbins, who is still on the run. After a car chase, they manage to corner him and arrest him, but he denies any involvement in Ecklersley' death, but hints at a deceased girl's sister, Ella Clancy, seeking revenge for her sister Kayla's death. The Fly Team finds the father in Prague as well, but quickly determine that Ella had every motive to kill Eckersley. When she is cornered by Kellett, she asks her to throw away the bag containing her weapons. Ultimately her father confesses to the murder to protect her, while Kellett disposes of the weapons. Dobbins attempts to seek asylum, but the Czech quickly dismiss his request. Kellett also finds herself struggling to maintain a relationship with her mother due to the fact that she is working far from home.: Julian McMahon (Jess LaCroix) is credited as a Special Guest Star.
8	8	"Voice of the People"	John Polson	Stuti Malhotra	December 7, 2021	INT108	5.79
While attending a music festival in Budapest, Vo and Raines are affected by a bombing, which kills seven people, among them a few Americans. In cooperation with the Hungarian police, the Fly Team discover aluminium nitrate in the explosives utilized, which they track back to a factory plant outside the city. A worker who was recently fired, Elek Simko, is determined to be the bomber when it becomes evident that he was fed up with his company and their subordinates. A second bombing occurs at the company that provides the plant with new technology, and they determine that a third bomb would strike the company leadership. Professor Octavius Vargas is also held accountable in influencing Simko with his anti-cooperations rhetoric, and is also arrested for financial transactions that implicates him in funding Simko's bombings. Simko himself is arrested before he can detonate the third bomb. Vo begins to reconsider dating with the background of her job, when her fling is affected by the bombing.
9	9	"One Kind of Madman"	Michael Katleman	Roxanne Paredes	January 4, 2022	INT109	6.06
A group of Albanian terrorists assault the Balkan Philharmonic Auditorium in Sofia, Bulgaria, and hold the audience hostage, with 15 American students among them. They demand $10 million in cryptocurrency as ransom, and will only speak with the FBI. The Bulgarian police allows Forrester to handle the situation until its Commissar arrives. During a medical check up, Raines discovers that one of the terrorists wants to desert the crisis, and in return for safety, he gives them intel about the building layout and the posts of the remaining terrorists. Once the Commissar arrives, he expresses that he wants to pump poison gas into the air conditioning system and raid the theater, like the Russians did in the Moscow theater hostage crisis, despite Forrester reminding him of the high number of casualties. Forrester and his team get 10 minutes to enter to rescue the hostages, and they manage it only seconds before the Commissar would have given the order to release the gas. Meanwhile, Tank undergoes surgery at the vet, after the vet discovers irregularities in his body, but Tank manages.
10	10	"Close to the Sun"	Rob Greenlea	Hussain Pirani	January 11, 2022	INT110	6.29
Porter, an agent from the FBI's Office of Professional Responsibility comes to Budapest to investigate Kellett about her actions in the Czech Republic (in "Trying to Grab Smoke"). Later, the team is called to Belfast, Northern Ireland, where one of Kellett's informants, Liam Walsh, has been arrested in connection to the murder of police officer Brianna Quinn. He claims innocence from the killing and offers information on an IRA gun-smuggling ring. When they visit his ex-wife, they deduce the divorce was a sham for their protection. Forrester and Raines discover that the Quinn's partner was corrupt and had been feeding intel to Walsh. On the way to a meet up spot, Kellett deduces that Walsh is the ring-leader and had planned to kill her, but she turns the tables on him by forcing him to choose between her and saving his family. Walsh chooses his family, and him and the ring are arrested. Back in Hungary, Forrester lies to protect Kellett from the OPR, but she tells them they should temporarily put a break on their relationship. Tank is also cleared to return to work.
11	11	"Chew Toy"	Rob Greenlea	Hussain Pirani	February 1, 2022	INT111	6.25
When Mark Douglas, a NYPD officer assigned to information gathering in Transnistria, assaults and shoots a man at a bar, the team are assigned to find him. But as an unrecognized territory, neither the FBI or the Europol have official contacts here, but Katrin accompanies them because she does have contacts as a German officer. Mark tells them he was investigating a woman-trafficking ring and wanted to help a woman called Sabina. His NYPD contact, also his cousin, tells them Mark lost his pregnant wife in the September 11 attacks. Sabina shares a strong resemblance to her. A corrupt officer offers them a way to smuggle Mark out. They end up cutting a deal with the corrupt officer and with the help of their contact, a clean officer, arrest everyone and find Sabina with Jubal Valentine returning once again to give the team an insight into the case with the episode ending with Forrester's mother tracking him down at a bar.: Jeremy Sisto (Jubal Valentine) is credited as a Special Guest Star.
12	12	"One Point One Million Followers"	Hernan Otaño	Derek Haas	February 22, 2022	INT112	6.14
American tech tycoon Michael Vestal kills his elderly neighbour in Frankfurt, Germany, before going on the run, inciting his followers on social media about a conspiracy by the Fly Team and German police trying to silence him. Despite the followers attempting to hinder their investigation, the Fly Team learn that Vestal intended for his partner in a German security company to hand over a suitcase of cash, but another conspiracy video published beforehand makes Forrester realise it is a trap. An extra key from Vestal's house leads them to conclude that his neighbor's wife was his mistress and he killed him to hinder him from revealing the truth. They stop them from trying to cross the Swiss border. Forrester and Kellett attempt to move on from their relationship, and he reunites with his mother, who asks him to retrieve a classified file from Washington. Ultimately, he contacts Counterintelligence to help him, but inadvertently helps his mother avoid capture.
13	13	"Snakes"	Loren Yaconelli	Matt Olmstead	March 8, 2022	INT113	5.92
James and Fiona Delvina flee Los Angeles for Tirana, Albania, after having been charged with stealing $30 million in COVID-19 funds, leaving their children behind. The Fly Team and Jaeger work with Albanian police to locate the couple, and are aided by a former family servant, but she is revealed to have worked with James, who is swiftly arrested by Jaeger. The Delvina children are brought to Albania as leverage on Forrester's orders, but Raines objects to how far they should be used as such. Forrester threatens James with separating the children and putting them into foster care if he doesn't ask Fiona to surrender, which he ultimately does. However, Fiona misses the meet-up, instead prompting to continue her escape. Forrester ultimately decides to reverse his threat and pledges for the children to stay together regardless. Both him and Kellett struggle to maintain a professional relationship in the wake of their separation, but Kellett works out to keep their relationship in camera blind spots in their favor. The professional barrier also has Forrester place her on desk duty while the rest of the team work in Albania.
14	14	"The Kill List"	David Barrett	Wade McIntyre	March 22, 2022	INT114	6.12
The Fly Team find themselves working with the security unit for US Attorney General Rebecca Blair when one of her aids is murdered in Budapest. Blair arrives ahead of schedule to meet with the Hungarian Prosecutor General regarding the extradition of whistleblower John Mallory. With Kellett taking the helm, they learn that Mallory wanted to release a report into a kill list the US government utilized for Afghan assets prior to their withdrawal, that was used to aid the Taliban. The killer is identified as former soldier Mia Sahar, whose fiancé was an Afghan translator, and is seeking revenge against Blair based on the classified intel received from the murdered aid. Sahar manages to disguise herself as a motorcycle unit escorting Blair, but is stopped by Forrester. Despite their differences, both Blair and her security chief express valuable lessons learned from the case. Raines meets his sister Jordan (Laila Drew) who has arrived in Budapest with friends, but is unable to spend quality time with her before she is bound for Belgrade.
15	15	"Shouldn't Have Left Her"	Michael Katleman	Derek Haas	March 29, 2022	INT115	6.24
Raines's sister Jordan and her friends find themselves abducted and one left for dead upon arriving in Pristina, Kosovo. The Fly Team attempt to aid Raines in rescuing his sister, but Forrester and Kellett are held back by Porter, who narrows his focus on their past actions. While Jaeger goes through existing channels to gain contact in Kosovo, Raines takes matters into his own hands and travels to Pristina, where he works with a sympathetic Kosovar detective. They learn that Jordan and her friend Grace were abducted for sex trafficking, which her boyfriend Ethan indirectly had lured them into through his university roommate Leon. Through a private detective who aided the kidnappers in serving as a scam front, they determine the girls' location and head their to free them. The detective is killed in the ensuing shootout, and Raines frees both Jordan and Grace. The Kosovo Police hold him in custody until Jaeger arrives and demands his release. Forrester, Kellett and Vo discover that Porter had ulterior motives to investigate them and was seeing a mistress in Budapest, which they use to force him to drop his case.
16	16	"Left of Boom"	Nina Lopez-Corrado	Rachael Joyce	April 12, 2022	INT116	5.79
Vo is reunited with childhood friend and fellow Quantico graduate Nick Thorpe, but later overhears gunshots that kills a gambling regulator and Thorpe nowhere to be seen. Thorpe again flees after Kellett learns from Vo he is at Vo's apartment. Once Thorpe finally cooperates, he reveals he works for casino owner Paul Kovacs and that the regulator aided him in money laundering. Vo and Raines join him undercover to set up a buy for Kovacs, but once the deal is struck and they meet for the money transfer, Kovacs changes meeting locations last minute and has his enforcers execute the three, but they manage to escape. The Hungarian police arrest Kovacs, and bullet residue determines that one of his enforcers killed the regulator. However, Thorpe attempts to escape to Morocco once they learn that he was the one who actually laundered money. Vo corners him at the airport and he is subsequently arrested.
17	17	"Uprooting"	Avi Youabian	Brooke Roberts	April 19, 2022	INT117	6.02
American vintner Daniel Spencer is shot dead while on his wine estate in Occitania, France. Upon arrival, the Fly Team quickly suspect a local protest group who is against foreigners owning and utilizing their land, and at times find their investigation disrupted due to their grudges. The leader of the protest group denies their involvement, but later clues prove that one of their former members killed Spencer. Said member later tries to kill Spencer's widow, but Kellett protects her and subdues him out. Ultimately the Fly Team and French police learn that the Spencer's partners, the Martins, had hired the former member to scare the Spencers into leaving France so they could take over their wine estate in order to pay of their debt. The protest group is cleared of any wrongdoing and their leader thanks Forrester personally. Back in Budapest, Forrester grows closer to his Hungarian language instructor, which also causes an uneasy tension between him and Kellett.
18	18	"On These Waters"	Michael Katleman	Hussain Pirani	April 26, 2022	INT118	6.10
In the aftermath of a frenzied attack by gunmen on board an American-owned river cruise ship on the Danube, the team heads to Vienna, Austria, in hopes of finding out why the boat was targeted, working with the Austrian police and the UNODC. They discover that the boat was carrying heroin, which was smuggled through by a Balkan cartel and was possibly targeted by a local gang, but they didn't find the stash. The boat company's system cracks in hiring employees and lack of locker room security cameras come into play as the captain is revealed to be involved through his troublesome half brother, who tricked the local gang about the heroin's placement. The captain is arrested after he kills his half brother during an undercover sting in an attempt to tie up loose ends. Scott comes to the realization his own feelings of mistrust caused by what happened in his past are beginning to have an effect on his personal relationships. His relationship with his Hungarian language instructor comes to end in the aftermath of her name popping up related to the investigation.
19	19	"Get That Revolution Started"	Jonathan Brown	Wade McIntyre	May 10, 2022	INT119	5.82
A sniper kills American scientist Christopher Staton during an attack on a biomedical lab in Brussels, Belgium. The Fly Team work with Jaeger, Europol, Belgian police and the Belgian Army when it is revealed that the sniper, Patrick Jans, was a sniper for the army and holds far-right views and targeted the lab to get to lead scientist Luc Michaud. A hit list further proves this, but digital evidence points them to Michaud's assistant Marc Claes, who used Jans to eliminate what he branded the "old guard" of the science world. Jaeger's supervisor orders Michaud and his family to be moved to a new location just as Jans attacks. Kellett discovers his location and attempts to talk him down, but he commits suicide by walking of the roof much to her distress. Jaeger is fired for seemingly advising her supervisor to move Michaud, which she and Forrester deduces was for him to find a reason to dismiss her over her loyalty to the Fly Team in the first place.
20	20	"Black Penguin"	Milan Cheylov	Roxanne Paredes	May 17, 2022	INT120	5.96
The Fly Team are approached by the ambassadors to Germany and Hungary with a request from the president to help investigate the overdose of 19-year-old Thomas Watts, the son of billionaire Gabriel Watts, in Berlin. The team works with the German police, but gradually discover that they have been reporting to Watts' private investigative company, headed by the Watts' bodyguard; who has been trying to slow their investigation. The team learn that Thomas bought pills from a known supplier, but in an attempt to catch the supplier, Watts's company moves in the for arrest with the German police' backing. Gabriel Watts removes the team from the investigation after Thomas dies. With the drug supply app turning to a dead end, Forrester discovers that the bodyguard arrived in Berlin earlier then the Watts, and questions him about the circumstances before he admits to supplying Thomas with the pills. Forrester asks a favor of the ambassador to Hungary to pull strings to have Jaeger's superior fired in retaliation for him firing her, leading to her being reinstated.
21	21	"Crestfallen"	Rob Greenlea	Matt Olmstead	May 24, 2022	INT121	5.32
A private jet carrying American industry businessman Greg Hutchinson is shot down over Poland, and Forrester finds himself conflicted when his mother offers information on the case, pointing him to a Russian informant from the Kremlin who is on the run. He goes rogue and heads to Pula, Croatia, to work with Jaeger's colleague Astrid Jensen to protect the informant, Pavel Novikoff. The team meanwhile discover that two hitman brothers were deployed to take out Novikoff and will stop at nothing to achieve their objective; while they also attempt to keep their ground with their new supervisor Ken Dandridge and General Finley. When the brothers arrive in Croatia, Forrester finally decides to involve Dandridge and Finley, who arranges for a pickup for Novikoff to the US. In the ensuing escape, Forrester kills one of the brothers and learns that his mother has been compromised as a double agent. He receives one last call from her, and someone raids her location before the call ends. Back in Budapest, the team arrange a goodbye party for Jaeger and as they celebrate, are unaware that the surviving brother is watching them from a distance.: This episode marks the final regular appearance of Christiane Paul (Katrin Jaeger).

== Production ==
=== Development ===
On January 12, 2020, it was reported that Dick Wolf was having conversations with CBS Entertainment President Kelly Kahl about launching a second FBI spinoff, following the success of the first spinoff, FBI: Most Wanted. Wolf claimed he always envisioned FBI as a franchise, as it offers an "endless trove of stories", while Kahl states "We are always talking to Dick [Wolf] and Dick is always bouncing ideas off of us and I can't rule anything out." It was also reported that development of the proposed spinoff would begin during the 2020–21 television season.

On February 18, 2021, it was announced that a second FBI spinoff titled FBI: International was being developed for the 2021–22 television season. Derek Haas was announced as the series showrunner and one of its executive producers, alongside Wolf, Peter Jankowski, and Arthur Forney. The new series is also likely, to begin with, a backdoor pilot. On March 24, 2021, CBS officially ordered the series, announcing it would debut in a crossover episode of FBI and FBI: Most Wanted, with Rick Eid also being added as an executive producer.

== Release ==
FBI: International premiered on September 21, 2021; a full season was ordered on October 11, 2021.

== Ratings ==
Viewership and ratings per episode of FBI: International season 1
No.	Title	Air date	Rating (18–49)	Viewers (millions)	DVR (18–49)	DVR viewers (millions)	Total (18–49)	Total viewers (millions)
1	"Pilot"	September 21, 2021	0.6	6.43	—N/a	—N/a	—N/a	—N/a
2	"The Edge"	September 28, 2021	0.5	6.04	—N/a	—N/a	—N/a	—N/a
3	"Secrets as Weapons"	October 5, 2021	0.5	6.08	—N/a	—N/a	—N/a	—N/a
4	"American Optimism"	October 12, 2021	0.6	5.64	0.3	2.03	0.8	7.55
5	"The Soul of Chess"	November 2, 2021	0.5	5.42	—N/a	—N/a	—N/a	—N/a
6	"The Secrets She Knows"	November 9, 2021	0.5	5.59	—N/a	—N/a	—N/a	—N/a
7	"Trying to Grab Smoke"	November 16, 2021	0.5	5.96	0.3	2.30	0.8	8.26
8	"Voice of the People"	December 7, 2021	0.5	5.79	0.2	2.14	0.8	7.93
9	"One Kind of Madman"	January 4, 2022	0.6	6.06	—N/a	—N/a	—N/a	—N/a
10	"Close to the Sun"	January 11, 2022	0.6	6.29	—N/a	—N/a	—N/a	—N/a
11	"Chew Toy"	February 1, 2022	0.6	6.25	—N/a	—N/a	—N/a	—N/a
12	"One Point One Million Followers"	February 22, 2022	0.5	6.14	—N/a	—N/a	—N/a	—N/a
13	"Snakes"	March 8, 2022	0.5	5.92	—N/a	—N/a	—N/a	—N/a
14	"The Kill List"	March 22, 2022	0.5	6.12	—N/a	—N/a	—N/a	—N/a
15	"Shouldn't Have Left Her"	March 29, 2022	0.6	6.24	—N/a	—N/a	—N/a	—N/a
16	"Left of Boom"	April 12, 2022	0.5	5.79	—N/a	—N/a	—N/a	—N/a
17	"Uprooting"	April 19, 2022	0.5	6.02	—N/a	—N/a	—N/a	—N/a
18	"On These Waters"	April 26, 2022	0.5	6.10	—N/a	—N/a	—N/a	—N/a
19	"Get That Revolution Started"	May 10, 2022	0.5	5.82	—N/a	—N/a	—N/a	—N/a
20	"Black Penguin"	May 17, 2022	0.5	5.96	—N/a	—N/a	—N/a	—N/a
21	"Crestfallen"	May 24, 2022	0.4	5.32	—N/a	—N/a	—N/a	—N/a
