= FBI: Most Wanted season 4 =

Season of American television series

FBI: Most Wanted
- Season 4
- Starring: Dylan McDermott; Alexa Davalos; Roxy Sternberg; Keisha Castle-Hughes; Edwin Hodge
- No. of episodes: 22

Release
- Original network: CBS
- Original release: September 20, 2022 – May 23, 2023

Season chronology
- ← Previous; Season 3 Next → Season 5

The fourth season of the American police procedural television series FBI: Most Wanted premiered on September 20, 2022, on CBS, for the 2022–23 television season, and concluded on May 23, 2023. The season contained 22 episodes.

FBI: Most Wanted focuses on the work of FBI's New York Fugitive Task Force, which relentlessly tracks and captures the notorious and dangerous criminals on the FBI's Most Wanted list. A crossover event with FBI and FBI: International took place during the season in episode 16. This is the first season to feature Edwin Hodge as Ray Cannon, and the last to feature Alexa Davalos as Kristin Gaines.

For the 2022–23 television season, the fourth season of FBI: Most Wanted ranked #14 with an average of 8.02 million viewers.

== Cast and characters ==
=== Main ===
- Dylan McDermott as Remy Scott, FBI Supervisory Special Agent and Team Leader.
- Alexa Davalos as Kristin Gaines, A former Office of Naval Intelligence officer and FBI Special Agent.
- Roxy Sternberg as Sheryll Barnes, FBI Special Agent and second in command of the Fugitive Task Force.
- Keisha Castle-Hughes as Hana Gibson, FBI Special Agent and Intelligence Analyst of the Fugitive Task Force.
- Edwin Hodge as Ray Cannon (episodes 2–22), FBI Special Agent, Ivan's replacement as the team's sharpshooter/sniper of the Fugitive Task Force and former New Orleans Police Department cop.

=== Recurring ===
- Rebecca Brooksher as Claire Scott
- Nneka Okafor as Serena Wade
- Wendy Moniz as Judge April Brooks
- Zoë Sophia Garcia as Kim Fogelman
- Shaun Anthony as Joshua Fogelman
- Caroline Harris as Cora Love
- Tonye Patano as Susan "Mama B" Barnes

=== Crossover ===
- Missy Peregrym as Special Agent Maggie Bell
- Zeeko Zaki as Special Agent Omar Adom "OA" Zidan
- John Boyd as Special Agent Stuart Scola
- Katherine Renee Kane as Special Agent Tiffany Wallace
- Alana de la Garza as Special Agent in Charge Isobel Castille
- Jeremy Sisto as Assistant Special Agent in Charge Jubal Valentine
- Luke Kleintank as Supervisory Special Agent Scott Forrester

== Episodes ==
No. overall	No. in season	Title	Directed by	Written by	Original release date	Prod. code	U.S. viewers (millions)
52	1	"Iron Pipeline"	Peter Stebbings	Richard Sweren	September 20, 2022	MW402	5.27
As Barnes returns from her maternity leave, meeting Remy for the first time with it also being revealed that Ortiz has permanently transferred back to Los Angeles, to continue looking after his sick father, the Fugitive Task Force investigates, with the help of an ATF agent, when a family of four is found dead in a motel room in Georgia. The team discovers a link between the victims and the sale of illegal guns, which were stolen by Walker Hawley and his friend Donte Colson. Midway on I-95, Colson escapes, but Hawley shoots him. Hawley makes it to Pennsylvania to sell his guns. Barnes struggles to adjust to the changes in the team that have occurred during her absence as well as Scott's leadership style and raises questions about his ethics about going undercover to meet Hawley's buyer. Despite nearly being made, Scott makes it out. The Task Force arrests the buyer and shoots Hawley. They also track down another customer to the buyer, who is the father of a summer camp shooting victim who seeks to bring attention to the shooting by targeting a pro-gun event. He holds the leader hostage and forces him to share his daughter's crime scene photo with the NRA followers online. When he has a breakdown, the Task Force move in to arrest him. Scott asks his sister, Claire to have their mother sent to a care home after an incident, which he begins to regret until he sees how well their mother has settled in.
53	2	"Taxman"	Ken Girotti	David Hudgins	September 27, 2022	MW401	5.40
As the Fugitive Task Force meets FBI agent Ray Cannon, the team's newest member, they find themselves searching for a criminal who's targeting IRS offices in Tennessee. They learn that the now fugitive, Darla Crais, suffers from multiple personality disorder as a result of being abandoned at a gas station by her parents as a child and has recently developed a third personality, which take the form of an abusive man. Another IRS agent is killed. The Task Force learns that said agent and the first victim, were co-workers of Crais at an IRS office. Crais had previously claimed they raped her during a conference in Colorado but had later withdrawn the complaint. It's revealed that Crais is pregnant and likely didn't want to be registered for abortion because her DID could be revealed. Crais takes the director of a clinic hostage in Atlanta, Georgia and attempts to open her wound and get the baby out herself. The situation is de-fused and Crais is further treated. Both Barnes and Cannon experience difficulties with Scott, the former feeling she has been downgraded despite her longtime experience. Gibson advises Cannon to learn from his mistakes. Barnes and Scott agree that the latter should do better by her going forwards.: This episode marks the debut appearance of Edwin Hodge (Ray Cannon)
54	3	"Succession"	Tess Malone	Wendy West	October 4, 2022	MW403	5.28
As the team, along with the DEA, begin searching for people who attacked and robbed a diamond store in the Diamond District in downtown New York, it is revealed that the case is connected to Kristin's own undercover past during her time as an agent in Miami with connection to the Zamora family. Two of the brothers are in New York following the assassination of their father, both vying to take over the cartel. In hindsight, the oldest son, Manuel, has secretly taken over and conspires with the youngest son Oscar, who is vying a seat at the table. Gaines and the Task Force secure the daughter, Lucia, who was her informant while undercover, and put her and a former prostitute in a safe house. The DEA receives inside information that Manuel is conducting a drug sale in Newark, which the Task Force break up. Gaines confronts Oscar, who also raped her during her time undercover, but ends up strangling him to death after he resists arrest. Lucia escapes from hospital after getting drugged, and is revealed to have masterminded the entire case so she could take over the cartel herself. Despite arguing against her daughter in getting a tattoo, Gaines decides to do so anyway after the case.
55	4	"Gold Diggers"	Don McCutcheon	Stephanie Sengupta	October 11, 2022	MW404	5.41
After a professor who had her throat slashed manages to dig herself outside of a grave she was buried in and eventually dies during surgery, the team investigate her murder and discover it is connected to gold that went missing during the Civil War, although there is evidence that indicates it may be a myth. Through connections to a thief turning up dead with stolen era maps and the discovery of a cave in Pennsylvania, the Task Force find themselves sidelined when the Treasury Department steps in to search the cave for the gold. Meanwhile, the Task Force discovers that Ranger Toby Medina had cleared the grandparents of Sadie Sykes, one of three participants searching for the gold in the local area; to dig up the gold and get a fair share. Medina takes Sadie hostage, believing she knows where the gold is. When negotiations fails, Cannon shoots Medina in the head, killing him and saving Sadie's life. The Treasury Department doesn't find the gold, concluding it was a hoax all along. Scott and Brooks attend an art event and he wins the betting and is reunited with an old friend, Fiona Paley, who Brooks becomes wary of after she personally hands Scott the award.
56	5	"Chains"	Ken Girotti	Elizabeth Rinehart	October 18, 2022	MW405	5.29
While heading to visit her sister in Texas, Gibson is kidnapped after helping a girl she suspects is being abused. It turns out her father and stepmother is trafficking her to pedophiles via a contact, Doug Sandwood. She forms a bond with the girl, Ollie, and sets out to get them out of the house their trapped in. Meanwhile, Scott and the Task Force work with local law enforcement and other FBI offices to triangulate Gibson's location and discover the awful truth of Ollie's life ever since her mother separated from her father. When Gibson and Ollie escape the house, they take with them a kidnapped infant, only to be stopped by her father. Just then, Scott and the Task Force arrive and shoot the father when he resists. Ollie is reunited with her mother, and Gibson admits that the story she told her while they were held captive; about using pain for good causes, was about herself.
57	6	"Patent Pending"	Sudz Sutherland	Ryan Causey	November 15, 2022	MW406	4.74
When a tech entrepreneur is murdered, the team investigate and soon find themselves entering the world of psychedelics to find his killer, leading them to a depressed and troubled young man, Jake Cooley, dealing with the effects of his mother's suicide and the manipulative wife, Becca McCann, of a couple owning a private school he worked at. They also learn that she is using a specialised substance and pull to make him do her bidding, somewhat resembling scopolamine. After they drug the water bottles at her rival's presentation, McCann brings him to Hudson Gorge, where Cooley's mother died. The Task Force and state police arrive and Scott talks Cooley down while McCann is shot dead and plunges into the gorge when she tries to kill Cooley. Barnes saves Cooley from committing suicide. Gibson struggles with the aftermath of her kidnapping, refusing to take pills. Cannon proposes an alternative way of coping to get her mind of things.
58	7	"Karma"	Cory Bowles	D. Dona Le	November 22, 2022	MW407	5.11
The team find their Thanksgiving plans being put on hold as they investigate a shooting at a Buddhist temple. Through surveillance footage in the city, they identify the shooter as Adam Moore, who according to a DOJ agent, demanded the arrest of people he deemed war criminals for pirates near slaughtering Vietnamese refugees on an island outside of Thailand in the 1970s. Two of the victims at the temple were related to the event in addition to former Senator William Hunter. Moore later abducts his ailing father to join him in facing the pirate mastermind at a shopping mall. Surrounded in the kitchen, Scott attempts to speak Moore down, but his father does so before executing the pirate mastermind and is killed in return. Scott's relationship with Brooks comes to a close when she states that it's obvious he is more devoted to his work then someone in a relationship. Scott instead spends Thanksgiving with Gibson and Cannon.
59	8	"Appeal"	Heather Cappiello	Spindrift Beck	December 13, 2022	MW408	5.00
Three prosecutors are murdered outside a bar in a town in Arkansas, and shortly after their boss, the district attorney, is also murdered. Initially all clues point to a hit on another prosecutor by the leader of the Memphis league of a Latino gang, but the lead ends there upon the DA being murdered. Parking garage surveillance points to circuit judge Howard Roarke, who recently applied for the state's court of appeals. His application was rejected on grounds of negative feedback and allegations, and he is seeking revenge against the people he deems ruins white people's position in the system. The Task Force learns he is targeting Arkansas Governor Nancy Novak who is attending a charity event, and needs to be tested for COVID-19. With a mix of fentanyl and vaccine substances, Roarke knocks both the Governor and her bodyguard unconscious, but paramedics are able to save them. The team attempt to stop Roarke from escaping, and a site security guard manages to shoot him in his attempt. Cannon seeks justice for Cora Love and her son Caleb, who have been evicted from their home despite one day remaining on their lease. With Gibson's help, Cannon orders the landlord to write up a new lease or face prison for tax evasion over a $75 000 debt.
60	9	"Processed"	Ken Girotti	Melissa Scrivner-Love	January 3, 2023	MW409	4.40
When celebrity child psychiatrist Olivia Kramer is kidnapped by a relative of a former client, the team race to find her. They identify the victim as Ruthie Denham, the half sister of Noah Tramble, who has kidnapped Kramer. Noah was thrown out of the family after he was supposedly found to have molested Ruthie, but neither of them have any memory of the event. Noah uses Kramer as support to get back with his ex girlfriend, but Kramer escapes with their daughter Rose, and the girlfriend later escapes his wrath as police ascend on the scene. Following Ruthie's hospitalisation after an attempted suicide, Noah hijacks her ambulance and kidnaps her after wrecking. Ruthie explains to him, as with Gaines earlier, that she was molested more than once. Noah and Ruthie go to confront their father, who was the real molester and had used Noah's drug addiction and highness to cover up his own misdeeds. Gaines talks him down from killing his stepfather and both are arrested. Gaines faces challenges with her daughter after she supposedly attended a party, which later proves incorrect and the two reconcile, agreeing that Gaines should tell her whenever she is not feeling OK.
61	10	"False Flag"	Cory Bowles	Zach Cannon	January 10, 2023	MW410	5.01
Delaware State Police detective Phil Brady is kidnapped and later executed by a masked woman, who the Task Force learns is Kim Fogelman, the wife of Joshua Fogelman who they arrested for targeting an pro-gun event (in "Iron Pipeline"). Kim is revealed to have delved into conspiracy theories fuelled by talkshow host Tanya Waters, that the shooting her daughter was killed in, was a false flag operation by the government. Believing her daughter to be alive, Kim conspires with Wolfgang Blair, Waters' son, to target left wing donor Damon Marshall and find her daughter, Maya. The Task Force convince Waters to talk her son down, which unbeknown to her, is broadcast live and her production crew walk out on her. Upon reaching Marshall's residence, the team knocks Wolfgang out and Barnes, with Marshall's help, talks Kim down. In prison, she is given Maya's belongings, but is still under the guise of her being alive. When their daughter expresses curiosity about religion, Barnes considers going to church with her mother to seek some peace, despite Charlotte's objection to not allow their daughter to do the same.
62	11	"Crypto Wars"	Milena Govich	Christopher Salmanpour	January 24, 2023	MW411	5.20
The team investigates an explosion at an energy plant in Ohio and soon races to find and save tech entrepreneur Graham Solinder, who has been abducted by former climate protestors Jonah and Billy Tanner. When the Tanner brothers are found dead and Solinder again gone, the Task Force learns that Solinder's energy plant head of security Tom Wallis orchestrated the abduction to get his memory stick containing $20 million. A South African enforcer halts Wallis' plan when he brings Solinder's to a professor who has the stick. The enforcer is revealed to be working for Chinese attaché Lao Tsun, who also seeks the memory stick. Solinder's autistic son Dante helps the team with transferring the memory stick's password to Lao, by having a virus function activate should the password be entered. Scott and his sister sell their mother's house. He later learns that Mikey's killer is considered for early release due to cancer. Determined to not let him out on the streets again, despite his sister's opposition, Scott heads to Florida.
63	12	"Black Mirror"	Jean de Segonzac	Richard Sweren	February 14, 2023	MW412	4.80
Teenagers Luke Spottiswood and Chloe LeBlanc are kidnapped by pastor Jacob Varitek and his brother Rudolph, leading law enforcement on a statewide hunt to find them. When Chloe attempts to escape, she is killed by Rudolph. The Task Force deduces that the brothers' radical actions might be connected to their father's painful death and intend to display the devil by disfiguring Luke. Scott goes in undercover to get Jacob to confess, but scares him away instead. After Luke is relocated by Rudolph, Scott orders Cannon to rescue him, managing to stab Rudolph in this attempt. The rest of the team end up in a high speed pursuit with Jacob, until he crashes. Scott shoots him when he attempts to stab him. Scott travels to Florida to give a statement to his brother's killer, Larry Davis' early release hearing. Ultimately the panel rejects an early release despite Davis' worsening condition. A documentary film maker, Serena Wade, visits Scott and asks him to speak on the victim's behalf in her documentary. In addition she presents evidence that suggests that Davis' judge was corrupt. Despite this, Scott refuses her offer and remains firm on Davis' guilt.
64	13	"Transaction"	Jon Cassar	Khalid A. Moalim	February 21, 2023	MW413	4.72
The Task Force works with the Minnesota FBI office in finding a fourteen-year-old girl who was kidnapped in Minneapolis. They soon find themselves navigating when it becomes clear that a deep-knit Somali community has a mistrust of the authorities. When the kidnapper resists arrest and is subsequently killed, clues point the team back to the girl's family, where the mother arranged the kidnapping to evoke fear in the controlling father, and she had plans to send their daughter away. When the father goes looking for them and finds them, he executes her after refusing to reveal the daughter's location. As the team ascends on scene, the father prepares to execute the daughter out of a religious context. Despite their attempts to talk him down, he attempts to go through with the execution, only to be killed himself with Barnes shooting him in the head. Cannon asks Cora out and the two spend time out in town and almost share a kiss on the ferry home; all the while Gibson is tasked with babysitting Cora's son Caleb.
65	14	"Wanted: America"	Ludovic Littee	Wendy West	February 28, 2023	MW414	4.72
Rising star triathlete Sparrow May is murdered in her home and the Task Force narrow in on her boyfriend, fellow triathlete Colby Dysart, who carries a divided reputation. He is quickly ruled out as a suspect and the focus leans into Mavis Kennedy, his previous girlfriend known to have a temper. During the course of the manhunt, Scott navigates the constant presence of the film crew of true crime documentary series Wanted: America, with his old flame Em McAdoo at the helm. Despite their shared history and troubles, the two gradually reconcile. Mavis' family conspires to get her out of the country, but only get her as far as the wilderness of New Hampshire. She enlists the help of her ex-wife Leah Wilson when she gets injured. Wilson holds her captive, but Mavis uses an opening to escape, but Wilson takes chase. As the Task Force and police ascend on scene, they shoot Wilson and injure Mavis before her arrest.
66	15	"Double Fault"	Ken Girotti	D. Dona Le	March 14, 2023	MW415	5.14
The Task Force are tasked with guarding a marathon event, but are dragged into investigating the abduction of Croatian tennis player Lula Arslan just adjacent. Scott, on the way to the event, takes chase in his personal vehicle, but is almost stopped by NYPD officers amid a shootout where the abductors switch vehicles. Gaines and Cannon track the decoy vehicle to a regional airport, where the perpetrators are quickly gunned down in a failed escape attempt. Gibson identifies the perpetrators as members of Iranian intelligence who has been dispatched to silence Lula due to her vocal opposition to the death of Mahsa Amini. Having commandeered a police cruiser, Scott arrives at the warehouse Lula has been brought to, entering a shootout with the perpetrators. With the rest of the team on scene, they attempt to talk them into letting Lula go. She manages to convince a younger member to go against his superior, who releases Lula and fails to execute her. Barnes' mentor Chuck Feld, now a private investigator, assists the team, having had a client put him on Lula's trail. Barnes later returns home, trying to find neutral ground with her father who has long opposed law enforcement. When her attempts fails, she rants about how he fails to see her as an individual opposed to her job. He apologises and promises to do better, which Barnes accepts.
67	16	"Imminent Threat – Part Three"	Ken Girotti	Teleplay by : Elizabeth Rinehart; Story by : Rick Eid & Elizabeth Rinehart	April 4, 2023	MW418	6.08
The Fugitive Task Force and the New York field office work together to secure the safety of the American President ahead of a UN speech, only to learn that he is in London. The team later save HR manager Allison Green whose foster brother works for a security company while Scola takes risks by going into a building that's on fire, having been rigged with a bomb and retrieving information, leading to Remy angrily berating him for it. Hana soon uncovers information revealing that the attack which is designed to make sure New Yorkers never feel safe again is scheduled to occur on that day with the real target revealed as JFK airport. Racing to the airport, the team work to find a target, Remy ordering everything to kept undercover as this could have General Stanislau Lenkov who's seeking revenge against the U.S. for a drone strike that killed his team and daughter on her wedding day setting off the bomb. With help from Maggie Bell and OA Zidan, Ray and Kristin apprehend Lenkov's men who were disguised as security guards before they arrest Lenkov, Kristin telling Lenkov the people in the airport are innocent and have nothing to do with that drone strike with Lenkov informing her that they matter to him as much as his daughter mattered to the U.S. and that what's left of his daughter is pieces. Remy and Scola travel underground, even apprehending Anton Averanka, the man who shot Scola's girlfriend, Nina Chase in Rome with Remy having to tell Scola to stand down to prevent him from exacting revenge, Remy even telling Scola that if he crosses that line, he will go from being a cop to a killer. Scola relents and instead arrests Averanka. Continuing on the way, the two agents soon find their efforts halted by security guard, Tom Davidson who attempts to stop them, believing they are terrorists. Despite pleading with him to stand down, noting this is no time to be a hero, Remy is forced to shoot Davidson, injuring him. Remy and Scola later find the bomb with Remy disarming it. With the threat over, all the remaining criminals are brought into custody. Later, Iobel gives a press conference to the media, informing them that thanks to agents in Italy and New York, the city was spared with Ray, Hana, Barnes, Maggie, OA, Tiffany and Jubal watching the conference. At the hospital, Remy asks for an update on Tom Davidson, only to learn that the security guard has died. Scola later arrives in Rome and meets Scott Forrester, the agent in charge of the FBI International Fly Team for the first time, Scola thanking him for staying with Nina. After Scott leaves, Scola heads into Nina's hospital room, reuniting with her as the two share a kiss. In New York, Remy and Isobel meet at a bar and discuss the case, Remy noting that sometimes there are no days where there's a right or a wrong, somedays are just wrongs while Isobel tells him that they made it to the podium and won, the two sharing a drink while reflecting on the case. Note: This episode concludes a crossover event that begins on FBI: International season 2, episode 16 and continues on FBI season 5, episode 17. Missy Peregrym (Maggie Bell), Zeeko Zaki (OA Zidan), John Boyd (Stuart Scola), Luke Kleintank (Scott Forrester), Shantel VanSanten (Nina Chase), Alana de la Garza (Isobel Castille) and Jeremy Sisto (Jubal Valentine) are credited as Special Guest Stars. This is also the final crossover episode with FBI and FBI: International as both FBI: Most Wanted and FBI: International are eventually cancelled in March 2025.
68	17	"The Miseducation of Metcalf 2"	Sharon Lewis	Stephanie SenGupta	April 11, 2023	MW416	5.03
Connecticut students Bethany Storm, Maya Addison and Carly Cassidy join the latter's brother Patrick after Addison and Storm's fathers confront Patrick for his strange behaviour as Storm's mother reported. Addison's father is also shot in the process. The Task Force find themselves facing the brainwashed students, now closed-knit around Patrick in something reminiscent of a cult. Despite Bethany's initial hesitation, she becomes gradually fully devoted. The team bust Carly when she tries to buy weapons, but she refuses to cooperate. Patrick and the remaining two rob a weapons store and consecutive local banks, planning to flee to an isolated island. The team deduces the banks' lack of alarm systems as a common thread and corner them at the next bank. Patrick is shot and Gibson talks Bethany down, eventually forcing her into surrendering. Gibson goes on a side mission to stop a pedophile, by posing as a 13-year-old girl and confronting the man with evidence of his actions, ensuring his downfall.
69	18	"Rangeland"	Loren Yaconelli	Richard Sweren & Ryan Causey	April 18, 2023	MW417	5.06
The team is called to Wyoming after two Bureau of Land Management agents go missing after trying to execute a cattle seizure warrant against a rancher who hasn't paid the land fees. The rancher, Will, killed the agents claiming that he thought were going for their guns. His brother Cole is involved in an anti-government rancher association and previously ran for Sheriff. Meanwhile, the man Gibson outed as a pedophile sends her a video of shooting himself, which causes her to make mistakes. The brothers kidnap the Bureau's chief and the Sheriff and put them in a mock trial before his association's ranchers. They hang the chief, but Will speaks up in favor of the Sheriff before the FBI surrounds them. The ranchers confront the FBI and the National Guard, but the FBI and the Sheriff manage to get Cole out and deactivate them. The Sheriff arrests the ranchers. Back in New York, Gaines tries to help Gibson deal with her trauma.
70	19	"Bad Seed"	Ludovic Littee	Spindrift Beck & Chris Salmanpour	April 25, 2023	MW419	5.10
Local Vermont reporter Lauren Baxter is killed in the parking lot of her work place, and swift initial evidence points to a known stalker, but post mortem it's revealed that he had an alibi for the murder. Following another murder of a pharmaceutical employee in Massachusetts, the Task Force identify their fugitive as Miles Maddox, who suffers from lupus, and likewise does his wife Savannah. They later learn that the two are working together to seek revenge upon Dr. Gregory Scanlon, who is their biological father and of 40 other children, through artificial insemination. Savannah is injured after being recognised at a bank and later ditches Miles to confront Scanlon herself. At his home in New Hampshire, she tortures him into confessing his wrongs. Scott talks her down, revealing that the ME discovered she is pregnant while Scanlon is rescued and then arrested. Convinced by both his sister and Gaines, Scott eventually reads the new motion about his brother's death. He learns that Mikey's stab wounds were post mortem, and thereby his crime scene was staged in order to frame Larry Davis.
71	20	"These Walls"	Peter Stebbings	David Hudgins & Richard Sweren	May 9, 2023	MW420	5.04
Scott and Gaines visit a penitentiary in New Jersey to speak to an informant, Mays Miller, about the death of a fellow agent. Before leaving, riots erupts between the two gangs of the penitentiary, the Aryan Saints and Sixty-Fives, with the former demanding the handover of Miller from the latter, knowing him to be a snitch. The rest of the task force are called in to aid in the search for an inmate's son, who got lost in the chaos after visiting his father. The head of security turns the son to the Saints, having been forced to work for them. Scott makes a deal with the inmate, Jordan Williams, to exchange his son for Miller to the Saints. Cannon overlooks the exchange, and executes the Saints leader before he can kill Miller. In return, Miller gives the name of the agent's killer who is swiftly arrested. Scott learns from Wade that an undisclosed witness proves that Davis is innocent and was nowhere near Mikey before his death. He calls the attorney, determined to learn who the witness was.
72	21	"Clean House"	Milena Govich	Wendy West & Rickey Cook	May 16, 2023	MW421	5.05
Venezuelan teenage asylum seekers Xiomara Torres and Regina Marquez start working for Carlos Morales, a presumed cleaning job, but are horrified to find themselves burying a body. Regina objects to the job and fights Morales, while Xiomara briefly escapes until Regina is killed and Morales recaptures her. Through the cleaning company he works for, Morales has Xiomara work at a luxury hotel in New York City, and she is assigned to work for property developer Easton Harcourt. After she resists him, Xiomara is later found dead after the Task Force identify Morales and chase him until the discovery. Ensuing information pinpoints that Morales supplies asylum seekers to work at the hotel, while Harcourt sexually exploited them and eventually killed them if they disobeyed. The magnitude of his crimes leads to his attorney quitting to represent him, and he attempts to escape when the Task Force approaches him, but is subsequently arrested. Barnes, Gibson and Gaines attend the funeral of several of his unidentified victims. Scott returns to Florida to apologise to Davis, who reluctantly accepts and gradually allows him to see the report into the unidentified witness. During the clearing process, Scott tasks Gibson to identify the witness.
73	22	"Heaven Falling"	Ken Girotti	David Hudgins	May 23, 2023	MW422	4.83
The Task Force aid police in tackling a hostage situation at a bank, where Cannon sneaks in and tackles the suspect without shots being fired. They later help Scott in re-investigating his brother's case. Scott speaks to the witness, who reveals Mikey had fought with a fellow peer rather than a man. The witness is later found dead some time after Mikey's former friend Benji Piccagli goes on the run. The cop who spoke to the witness 25 years ago confirms the witness statement used in Davis's file is falsified, since he wrote it by hand, but also reveals that a girl was involved, who is identified as Jenna Marks. The Task Force arrest Benji's mother for aiding and abiding before she can kill Jenna. The Task Force board a train to Montreal, where Scott forces Benji to confess. He explains that he hit Mikey with a rock after they drunkenly argued about Jenna. Furthermore his parents helped him cover up the crime, framing Davis and his father bribing the DA into sentencing him. After Benji's arrest, Scott is informed that Davis has died. In Wade's documentary, he issues his apology to Davis. He also meets Jenna, who reveals she had travelled to Florida to inform Mikey that she was pregnant with their child. Scott later goes to a cafe and meets Corey with Scott revealing that he's Corey's uncle while also meeting his long-lost nephew for the first time.: This episode marks the final appearance of Alexa Davalos (Kristin Gaines)

== Production ==
On May 9, 2022, CBS renewed the series for a fourth and fifth season. The fourth season premiered on September 20, 2022.

== Ratings ==
Viewership and ratings per episode of FBI: Most Wanted season 4
No.	Title	Air date	Rating (18–49)	Viewers (millions)	DVR (18–49)	DVR viewers (millions)	Total (18–49)	Total viewers (millions)
1	"Iron Pipeline"	September 20, 2022	0.5	5.27	0.3	2.94	0.8	8.20
2	"Taxman"	September 27, 2022	0.5	5.40	0.3	2.95	0.7	8.34
3	"Succession"	October 4, 2022	0.5	5.28	0.3	2.82	0.7	8.09
4	"Gold Diggers"	October 11, 2022	0.4	5.41	0.3	2.86	0.7	8.26
5	"Chains"	October 18, 2022	0.5	5.29	0.3	2.72	0.8	8.01
6	"Patent Pending"	November 15, 2022	0.4	4.74	0.3	3.01	0.6	7.76
7	"Karma"	November 22, 2022	0.4	5.11	—N/a	—N/a	—N/a	—N/a
8	"Appeal"	December 13, 2022	0.4	5.00	—N/a	—N/a	—N/a	—N/a
9	"Processed"	January 3, 2023	0.3	4.40	0.3	3.30	0.6	7.69
10	"False Flag"	January 10, 2023	0.5	5.01	0.4	3.39	0.8	8.41
11	"Crypto Wars"	January 24, 2023	0.4	5.20	—N/a	—N/a	—N/a	—N/a
12	"Black Mirror"	February 14, 2023	0.4	4.80	—N/a	—N/a	—N/a	—N/a
13	"Transaction"	February 21, 2023	0.3	4.72	—N/a	—N/a	—N/a	—N/a
14	"Wanted: America"	February 28, 2023	0.3	4.72	—N/a	—N/a	—N/a	—N/a
15	"Double Fault"	March 14, 2023	0.3	5.14	—N/a	—N/a	—N/a	—N/a
16	"Imminent Threat – Part Three"	April 4, 2023	0.5	6.08	—N/a	—N/a	—N/a	—N/a
17	"The Miseducation of Metcalf 2"	April 11, 2023	0.4	5.03	—N/a	—N/a	—N/a	—N/a
18	"Rangeland"	April 18, 2023	0.4	5.06	—N/a	—N/a	—N/a	—N/a
19	"Bad Seed"	April 25, 2023	0.4	5.10	—N/a	—N/a	—N/a	—N/a
20	"These Walls"	May 9, 2023	0.3	5.04	—N/a	—N/a	—N/a	—N/a
21	"Clean House"	May 16, 2023	0.4	5.05	—N/a	—N/a	—N/a	—N/a
22	"Heaven Falling"	May 23, 2023	0.3	4.83	—N/a	—N/a	—N/a	—N/a
