= Vittorio Vidotto =

Italian historian (1941–2024)

- Born: 17 March 1941; Milan, Italy
- Died: 3 February 2024 (aged 82); Rome, Italy
- Education: Sapienza University of Rome
- Occupation: Historian

Vittorio Vidotto (17 March 1941 – 3 February 2024) was an Italian historian.

== Biography ==
Vidotto was born in Milan on 17 March 1941. He earned a degree in modern literature from the Sapienza University of Rome, where he then taught for several decades. He was also an editor in medieval history and modern history for the Istituto dell'Enciclopedia Italiana, where in 1980 he directed the history and contemporary politics departments.

Vidotto was one of the main authors at Italian publishing house Editori Laterza, where he worked alongside Vito Laterza and Enrico Mistretta. In 1988, he began to publish numerous scholarly journals and manuscripts for this editor in collaboration with Andrea Giardina and Giovanni Sabbatucci.

Vittorio Vidotto died in Rome on 3 February 2024, at the age of 82.

== Publications ==
- Il Partito Comunista Italiano dalle origini al 1946 (1975)
- Storia d'Italia (1994–1999)
- Roma contemporanea (2001)
- Storia di Roma dall'antichità a oggi (2002)
- Italiani/e. Dal miracolo economico a oggi (2005)
- Guida allo studio della storia contemporanea (2006)
- 20 settembre 1870. La breccia di Porta Pia (2007)
- 1978. Il delitto Moro, in Novecento italiano (2008)
- Il mondo contemporaneo. Dal 1848 a oggi (2008)
- Nuovi Profili storici (2008)
- Storia contemporanea. L'Ottocento (2009)
- Storia moderna (2010)
- Atlante del Ventesimo secolo (2011)
- Storia contemporanea. Il Novecento (2011)
- Storia contemporanea. Il Novecento (2012)
- I mondi della Storia (2014)
