= FBI: International season 3 =

Season of American television series

FBI: International
- Season 3
- FBI: International Season 3 poster
- Starring: Luke Kleintank; Heida Reed; Carter Redwood; Vinessa Vidotto; Eva-Jane Willis; Christina Wolfe
- No. of episodes: 13

Release
- Original network: CBS
- Original release: February 13 – May 21, 2024

Season chronology
- ← Previous; Season 2 Next → Season 4

The third season of the American police procedural television drama series FBI: International was announced on May 9, 2022, along with the second season. The third season premiered on February 13, 2024 and ended in May 21, 2024 with 13 episodes. The season marked the departures of series regulars Luke Kleintank as the International Fly Team Leader Scott Forrester and Heida Reed as Jamie Kellett. Christina Wolfe joined the main cast as Amanda Tate.

== Cast and characters ==
=== Main ===
- Luke Kleintank as Scott Forrester, an FBI Supervisory Special Agent and head of the International Fly Team (episodes 1–11).
- Heida Reed as Jamie Kellett, an FBI Special Agent who was the team's second-in-command (episode 1)
- Carter Redwood as Andre Raines, an FBI Special Agent on the team, with a background in accounting.
- Vinessa Vidotto as Cameron Vo, an FBI Special Agent; she is a West Point graduate and later the team's new second-in-command, succeeding Kellett.
- Green as Tank, a black Giant Schnauzer trained in Schutzhund and retired cadaver dog that obeys Scott Forrester's commands.
- Eva-Jane Willis as Megan "Smitty" Garretson, the team's Europol liaison.
- Christina Wolfe as Amanda Tate, an FBI Supervisory Intelligence Analyst.

=== Recurring ===
- Greg Hovanessian as Special Agent Damian Powell
- Sarah Junillon as FBI Intelligence Analyst Claire Armbruster
- Stefan Trout as FBI Intelligence Analyst Ernesto Saunders
- Eric James Gravolin as FBI Intelligence Analyst Kyle Cartwright

=== Guest ===
- Colin Donnell as Brian Lange, an FBI Supervisory Special Agent and the FBI's liaison to the NSA
- Teri Polo as Tess Chaplain, a former military medic with Ukrainian origins who was captured alongside Forrester's mother, Angela Cassidy
- Steven Culp as Martin Russo, a CIA agent and Cassidy's former handler
- Þorvaldur Davíð as Einar Lindstrom

=== Crossover characters ===
- Jeremy Sisto as Jubal Valentine, FBI Assistant Special Agent in Charge (ASAC; FBI)

== Episodes ==
No. overall	No. in season	Title	Directed by	Written by	Original release date	Prod. code	U.S. viewers (millions)
44	1	"June"	Michael Katleman	Matt Olmstead	February 13, 2024	INT301	5.97
Following the attack which has left their headquarters in ruins, the Fly Team race to apprehend Olivia Thornton who's escaped from custody and bring down Yusif Sydin for good with assistance from analyst Amanda Tate and as they struggle to come to terms with what's happened. The team try to get to Thornton by questioning her partner and son but later release them due to lack of progress. However, as they later try to corner them in reuniting with Olivia, a hitman sent by Sydin kills her. The hitman is apprehended following a pursuit and cooperates and implicates Sydin in weapons dealing. Raines is hospitalized, suffering a serious injury to his leg, which he could risk getting amputated. However, Assistant Special in Charge Jubal Valentine of the New York field office manages to call a doctor over to work with Hungarian doctors to save his leg. In the aftermath of the attack, Jamie resigns from the team and later decides to return to the US, relocating to the Washington, D.C. field office.: This episode marks the final appearance of Heida Reed (Jamie Kellett). It also marks the debut appearance of Christina Wolfe (Amanda Tate) while Jeremy Sisto (Jubal Valentine) is credited as a Special Guest Star.
45	2	"The Last Stop"	Nina Lopez-Corrado	Edgar Castillo	February 20, 2024	INT302	5.44
Nine years ago, FBI agent Bill Cormack and four other contractors were abducted and assumed to have been killed in Tripoli, Libya. In present day, Cormack's daughter Beatrice receives a call that indicates he is alive. Forrester and Powell are dispatched undercover to the notorious Qamar prison outside of Tripoli in an attempt to break Cormack out and bring him home. However, along the way, both they and Smitty find their guard informant turning on them and must improvise Cormack's extradition even though Cormack is in a catatonic state. With the reluctant help of fellow inmate Hassan Abdallah, they manage to get Cormack out and back to safety and reunited with his daughter. Additionally, two of the other contractors are also rescued while also revealing that their colleagues died during the interrogation they were subjected to after they were captured. Raines makes a gradual recovery and is cleared for desk duty. The team settle in to a refurbished and upgraded HQ, while Vo is promoted to second-in-command, replacing Kellett.: This is the first episode where Jeremy Sisto (Jubal Valentine) isn't credited as a Special Guest Star. Instead, he appears under the list of Guest Stars for the episode, receiving the "And" credit.
46	3	"Magpie"	Alex Zakrzewski	Hussain Pirani	February 27, 2024	INT303	5.18
The sweet sixteen celebration of Emily Lambert is cut short when her mother Diane is found shot and killed at the family estate in Monaco. The Fly Team travel there to assist the Monegasque police with the investigation. When satellite recordings from the property are seized by the brother-in-law, they learn that he had a motive to seize the family fortune following Diane's death, but is backed by an alibi. Further deciphering of the recordings lead them to an old flame of Diane from Omaha, Nebraska, Connor Boyd, who has arrived in Monaco seeking to retrieve his share of the fortune after killing Diane. He takes Emily hostage at a local coffee shop and demands a clear path for them both to exit. Vo enters trying to negotiate, and Boyd is tackled following a disruption through a TV with a recording of Diane. Powell begins to distance himself from Vo, explaining that he thinks she has more chemistry with Raines than him.
47	4	"Cowboy Behavior"	Michael Katleman	Roxanne Paredes	March 12, 2024	INT304	5.40
Mark Shaw, a notorious criminal and womaniser, is tracked down to Sofia, Bulgaria, where he is exploiting underaged girls. The team head over to apprehend him on previous charges, but are halted by Bulgarian police, who cite incorrect paperwork as a reason. While doing their own digging, the team suspects that the police director is corrupt, but are more surprised to learn it's actually their Bulgarian liaison. While she doesn't explicitly know where Shaw's "playhouse" for punished girls is, she does provide them with the house leader's identity. Forrester tasks Raines with keeping tabs on a volatile Powell, who struggles with past experiences tackling a sex trafficker in Bolivia. He oversteps when he assaults Shaw in an interrogation room, and the Bulgarians threaten with disciplinary actions. Smitty however manages to negotiate a deal which clears Powell of any wrongdoing.: This is the second episode where Jeremy Sisto (Jubal Valentine) isn't credited as a Special Guest Star. Instead, he appears under the list of Guest Stars for the episode, receiving the "And" credit.
48	5	"Death by Inches"	Jonathan Brown	Wade McIntyre	March 19, 2024	INT305	5.34
Disgraced former US Secretary of Energy James Gaddis is arrested by Austrian police in Vienna on suspicion of peddling classified gold bars. The Fly Team arrive to assist the US embassy with the investigation, and learns that the bars were payment in exchange for handing classified nuclear documents to Iranian intelligence. Forrester goes undercover as a computer expert to assist Gaddis and the Iranian operative with removing the documents' redaction, but the team find cause for alarm when his GPS is deactivated when he and Gaddis are brought to a warehouse. However, Vo and Raines manages to deduce the area from CCTV footage and rescue Forrester and Gaddis, the latter turning on them last second. Additionally, Forrester has Powell benched for his behaviour in Bulgaria, but later finds himself offering him an undercover assignment in Germany to make ends meet. The mission is disrupted by an Iranian defector who was also tracking the operative, but Smitty finds a way for him to assist them and later gives him free passage in return.: This episode marks the final appearance of Greg Hovanessian (Damian Powell).
49	6	"Fire Starter"	Kevin Dowling	Rachael Joyce	March 26, 2024	INT306	5.08
Allie Baker, an American student, reports that she has been raped to Czech police in Prague, but is arrested after seemingly attacking the officers. The Fly Team head there and learns that she will be charged with assault on the officers and her rape case being dismissed due to lack of evidence, and furthermore for harassment after publicly revealing the officers' identities on social media. Forrester however manages to ensure that the latter charge is dropped. Vo leans on her military experience handling rape victims when getting through to Allie. The team begin to gather evidence which leads them to a Dutch linguist who is wanted for 18 other rape cases in Central and Southern Europe. The team head to Bratislava, his latest location, and work with Slovak police in an undercover operation to secure evidence against him. Vo goes undercover, but at a party, he switches victims last second before his arrest. The team and the police question him under the guise of drug charges in order to get a confession out of him.
50	7	"Andiamo!"	Jonathan Brown	Kyle Steinbach	April 2, 2024	INT307	5.42
Henry Dawson, the young son of Eli and Brianna Dawson, is abducted from a bunker at their new family home in Tuscany, Italy. The Fly Team work with the Italian police in locating Henry, but the matter is complicated when the anti-mafia police commissar Capo Mastroianni suspects mobster Marco Banchero is involved. The family decides to pay the ransom in exchange for Henry's return, which the team manage to secure enough funds for through Banchero's American assets and hidden money in the bunker; but Banchero goes back on his word. Mastroianni decides to kidnap Banchero's grandson in order to increase pressure on him, which the team are strongly against. However, they eventually figure how to use the commissar's strategy in their favour without actually kidnapping the grandson, with the help of AI, to make it seem like the grandson was kidnapped. Banchero relents and releases Henry, who is eventually returned safely to his parents. Tate makes a visit to her ex-husband in order to meet her daughter again.: Jeremy Sisto (Jubal Valentine) is credited as a Special Guest Star.
51	8	"Remove the Compromise"	John Behring	Edgar Castillo	April 9, 2024	INT308	5.33
Jubal Valentine heads to Budapest to assist the Fly Team and the CIA in taking down Byron Molina, the nephew of Durango cartel leader Antonio Vargas, who specialises in illegal weapons with Antonio having been responsible for ordering a series of attacks against Jubal and his colleagues in the FBI's New York Field Office three years ago with one incident resulting in the death of Jubal's girlfriend, Rina Trenholm. The CIA asks Forrester to go undercover as a weapons expert to assist their informant, Gabriel Fuentes. The team is however surprised to learn that the agency has no intention of allowing the cartel to be arrested and prosecuted, but killed by drone, which they strongly oppose. As the deal between Molina and an Austrian buyer goes down, Forrester realises that a girl who accompanied Molina will be a civilian casualty unless she can be extradited from the location, however the CIA remain adamant about intervening until the last second before the missile is dropped. Fuentes is killed in the ensuing struggle, while Molina remains heavily wounded, but survives and is apprehended. The CIA representative indicates that the Durango cartel was only the beginning for their new strategy abroad.: Jeremy Sisto (Jubal Valentine) is credited as a Special Guest Star.
52	9	"Rules of Blackjack"	Yangzom Brauen	Hussain Pirani	April 16, 2024	INT309	5.70
Raines and Tate are dispatched to the Western Romanian border to extradite The Chain Cutters right-hand-man Tyler Selvidge in return for information on his group, who are claiming to combat child trafficking. However, the guard post is ambushed leaving three guards and Selvidge dead and one guard injured. The duo stumble upon the leader, Sam Keaton, who was looking for Selvidge. He pinpoints that Xavier Lee, one of his own men, has gone rogue and is seeking to sacrifice a little girl for a religious calling. After a shootout with the Romanian mob, they take him to a village, where Raines fights Lee at the village church where the girl is kept hostage. Tate, who was injured but is now patched up, manages to kill Lee before he can activate the bomb strapped on the girl. Together with Romanian police, they return the girl to her parents. Following the mission, Raines begins to consider there exists a higher power.
53	10	"Red Light"	Michael Katleman	Rachael Joyce	April 23, 2024	INT310	5.74
Maritime security contractor Ryan Karloski is found murdered in his hotel room after a wild night out in Amsterdam's red light district. The team works with Dutch police to identify the killer but find themselves going against Karloski's friends when they take matters into their own hands. The crime scene is also revealed to be staged and evidence points back to his friends and the ship they work on. They learn from his uncle that he sought legal advice from him about witnessing human trafficking on the ship, and one his friends, Bernard Almaz, is revealed to have handled people on the ship and killed Karloski for knowing too much. With help from one of the ship's victims, the team apprehend the captain as well for leading the operation. Raines substitutes for Tate when she shifts focus on a custody battle of her daughter with her ex, which threatens her relationship with her daughter. She initially resigns from the team, but Raines secures her a specialised passport which will protect her from judicial persecution.
54	11	"Touts"	Attila Szalay	Wade McIntyre	May 7, 2024	INT311	4.94
Alec O'Brien, a former informant in the IRA, is killed while touring youth football academies in London with his son. The case brings Smitty to home grounds as the team work with the MI5 in what appears to be perpetrators going after former IRA informants. Smitty is reunited with her mother, and requests to be put in contact with another former informant, Niall Walsh, regarding other targets. Before she and Raines can speak to one, he is found barely alive and apprehend one of the perpetrators. The team learns that the duo of perpetrators were radicalised by former IRA member Patrick McEwan, while the MI5 seeks to arrest Walsh for their connections, unbeknown that he helped Smitty. In an undercover operation, the MI5 arrest both, but Walsh is let go after the team informs them of his assistance. Smitty learns that her mother had an affair with Walsh when she worked as a nurse in Belfast during the Troubles, and that Walsh is her biological father. However, she refrains from telling her non-biological father.: This episode marks the final appearance of Luke Kleintank (Scott Forrester).
55	12	"Gift"	Milena Govich	Roxanne Parades	May 14, 2024	INT312	4.79
Forrester goes missing just as the team are informed by the NSA's Adam Grayson of a data leak in Copenhagen following the death of cyber company founder Carl Lassen. The team work with the DDIS and the bureau's NSA liaison Brian Lange, to identify who was responsible for the leak, which leads them to the boyfriend of the au pair, Brie Martindale. However, he is struck by a truck before they can speak to him, but they learn that he worked with Army of Shadows, a notorious hacker group. Digital traces also suggests that a former DDIS agent leaked Lassen's info, but he denies having killed him. Lange and Vo learn that Forrester's disappearance might be related to the case through his mother being held in a Russian prison, and Lassen's killer, Philip Baranza, claims to have information about their whereabouts. With Tate unable to secure the file with their location, Grayson sneaks her a note, pointing them to the Norwegian foreign minister's efforts to secure the release of two Norwegian journalists held captive in Russia.
56	13	"Tuxhorn"	Michael Katleman	Matt Olmstead & Kyle Steinbach	May 21, 2024	INT313	4.52
The team arrive in Oslo and find themselves going solo in securing Angela Cassidy's release. Lange meets Russian-Norwegian businessman Bard Nikolai, working to exchange Russian activist Irina Safina for Cassidy. In Russia, prison guard Dmitri Volkov frees Cassidy and the two Norwegian journalists, escaping to an airfield and flying them back to Oslo. The team secures Safina and calls off the deal with Nikolai after learning that he is looking for a secret dossier Cassidy supposedly had and that he was Safina's abuser. They track her and Volkov to Holmenkollen, where a shootout ensues and Volkov is killed and his extraction helicopter shot down. Afterwards, Norwegian police apprehends them all, while the CIA and the Norwegian foreign minister are shown an intel file, which Smitty exchanges in return for the team's release. Tate discovers that Forrester and his mother fled to Alaska, and the woman they rescued was Tess Chaplain, who was captured alongside her and assumed her identity once Forrester had freed her. Not wanting to inform the deputy director of their findings, Lange orders the file to be wiped.

== Production ==
FBI: International was renewed for a second and third on May 9, 2022.

=== Casting ===
On December 7, 2023, it was announced that Heida Reed would leave the show some time during the third season. On April 23, 2024, it was announced that Luke Kleintank would leave the show during the third season. The next day, Colin Donnell joined the cast as a guest on third season.

== Ratings ==
Viewership and ratings per episode of FBI: International season 3
No.	Title	Air date	Rating (18–49)	Viewers (millions)	DVR (18–49)	DVR viewers (millions)	Total (18–49)	Total viewers (millions)
1	"June"	February 13, 2024	0.4	5.97	—N/a	—N/a	—N/a	—N/a
2	"The Last Stop"	February 20, 2024	0.4	5.44	—N/a	—N/a	—N/a	—N/a
3	"Magpie"	February 27, 2024	0.4	5.18	—N/a	—N/a	—N/a	—N/a
4	"Cowboy Behavior"	March 12, 2024	0.4	5.40	—N/a	—N/a	—N/a	—N/a
5	"Death by Inches"	March 19, 2024	0.4	5.34	0.1	1.80	0.5	7.14
6	"Fire Starter"	March 26, 2024	0.3	5.08	0.1	1.65	0.5	6.73
7	"Andiamo!"	April 2, 2024	0.4	5.42	0.1	1.83	0.5	7.24
8	"Remove the Compromise"	April 9, 2024	0.4	5.33	0.1	1.82	0.5	7.14
9	"Rules of Blackjack"	April 16, 2024	0.4	5.72	0.1	1.57	0.5	7.29
10	"Red Light"	April 23, 2024	0.4	5.74	0.1	1.75	0.5	7.49
11	"Touts"	May 7, 2024	0.4	4.94	0.1	1.71	0.5	6.56
12	"Gift"	May 14, 2024	0.3	4.79	0.1	1.70	0.4	6.49
13	"Tuxhorn"	May 21, 2024	0.3	4.52	—N/a	—N/a	—N/a	—N/a
