= Sellano =

- Comune
- Comune di Sellano
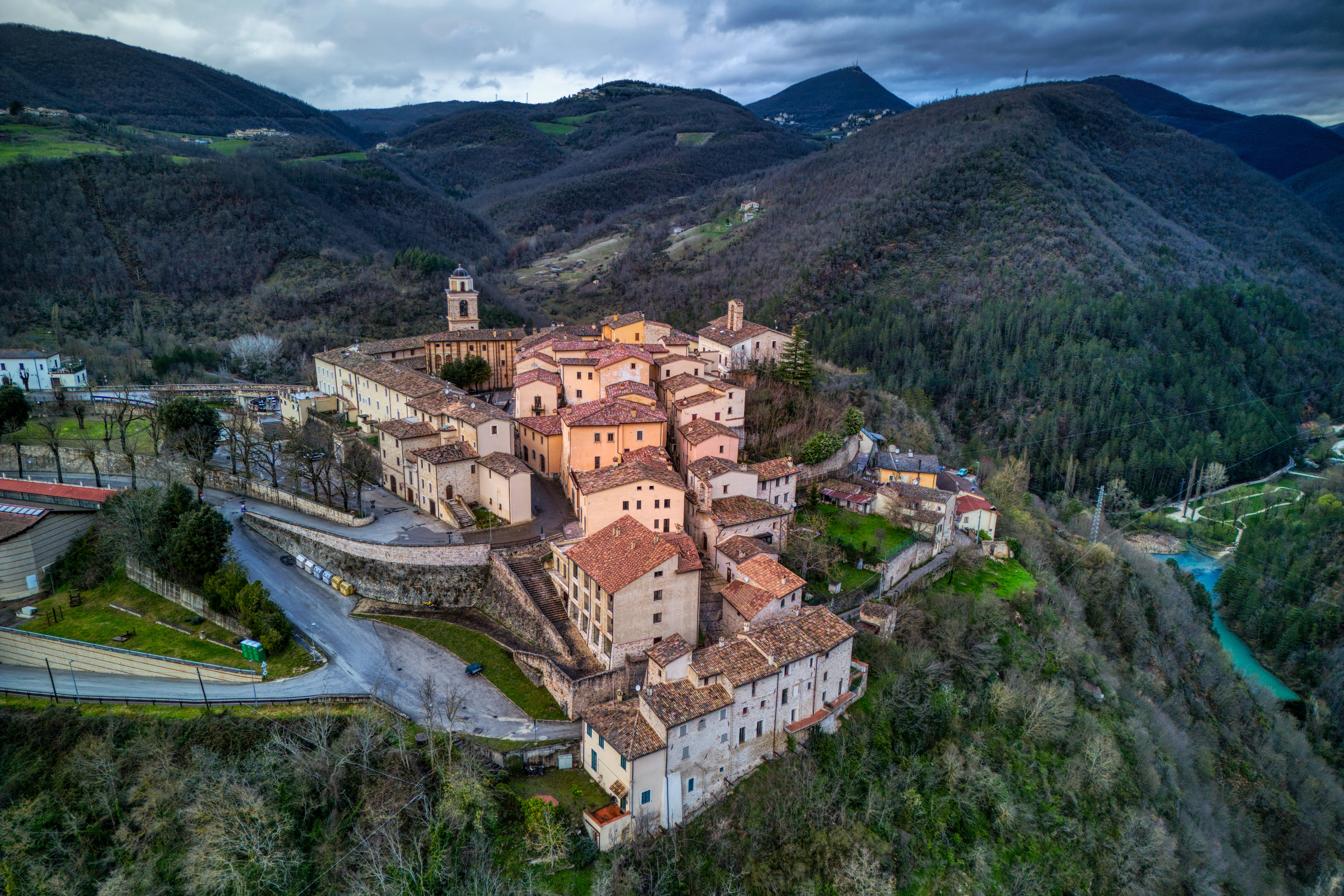
- View of Sellano

- Coat of arms

- Location within Italy Location within Umbria
- Coordinates: 42.888964°N 12.927178°E
- Country: Italy
- Region: Umbria
- Province: Perugia (PG)
- Frazioni: see list

Government
  - Mayor: Attilio Gubbiotti

Area
  - Total: 85.7 km^{2} (33.1 sq mi)
- Elevation: 640 m (2,100 ft)

Population (1 January 2025)
  - Total: 944
  - Density: 11.0/km^{2} (28.5/sq mi)
- Demonym: Sellanesi
- Time zone: UTC+1 (CET)
  - Summer (DST): UTC+2 (CEST)
- Postal code: 06030
- Dialing code: 0743
- Patron saint: San Severino
- Saint day: June 8
- Website: Official website

Sellano is a comune (municipality) in the Province of Perugia in the Italian region Umbria, located about 50 km southeast of Perugia.

Sellano borders the following municipalities: Campello sul Clitunno, Cerreto di Spoleto, Foligno, Trevi, Visso. It is one of I Borghi più belli d'Italia ("The most beautiful villages of Italy").

== Etymology ==
There have been attempts to link the name Sellano to Lucius Cornelius Sulla, as well as to ancient populations referred to as the Syllinates or Suillates, mentioned by Pliny the Elder. These interpretations were also discussed in early modern historiography by authors such as Severo Minervio, Achille Sansi, and Ludovico Jacobilli.

== History ==
Sellano formed part of the Duchy of Spoleto during the Lombard period and was under the Diocese of Spoleto from the early Christian and Lombard eras. It may have been under the control of the Alviano family until the end of the 12th century.

In the 12th century it came under the lords of Norcia, while in the 13th century it passed under the control of the Papal State. During the 14th century it was a fief of the Colligola family of Montesanto.

In the Middle Ages Sellano developed as an autonomous mountain municipality, maintaining an alliance with Spoleto. Owing to its strategic position, it played an important role in the area while remaining dependent on neighbouring centres. It showed Ghibelline and autonomist tendencies, and experienced political uprisings that continued until 1523.

In the early modern period Sellano remained within the territory of the district of Spoleto until the Napoleonic era.

In 1860 Sellano voted for annexation to the Kingdom of Italy. In 1895 Sellano had a population of 2,752 inhabitants.

== Geography ==
Sellano is situated at an elevation of 641 metres (2,103 ft) above sea level, on the eastern edge of its district. It lies to the east of the mountains that flank the Spoleto valley, near the banks of the Vigi stream, a right-hand tributary of the Nera. The village is located about 20 kilometres (12 mi) from Terni and 37 kilometres (23 mi) from Spoleto. The surrounding territory is predominantly mountainous.

The climate is described as temperate, with prevailing north and south-east winds.

=== Subdivisions ===
The municipality includes the localities of Apagni, Cammoro, Casale Ronchetti, Celle, Ceseggi, Civitella, Colle, Fonni, Mocali, Molini di Cammoro, Molini di Orsano, Montalbo, Montesanto, Ottaggi, Petrognano, Piaggia, Piedicammoro, Postignano, Pupaggi, San Martino, Sellano, Setri, Sterpare, Terne, Torre di Cammoro, Tribbio, Vene, Villamagina, Vio.

In 2021, 180 people lived in rural dispersed dwellings not assigned to any named locality. At the time, the most populous localities were Sellano proper (224), and Villamagina (173).

== Economy ==
In the 19th century Sellano had ten workshops producing rasps and files, described as unique within the Papal States. These workshops produced approximately 12,000 dozen large rasps and files and 24,000 dozen of other types, of which two-thirds were exported abroad. Agricultural tools such as ploughshares, spades, and hoes were also manufactured. The territory also included an iron mine.

=== Nature and ecotourism ===
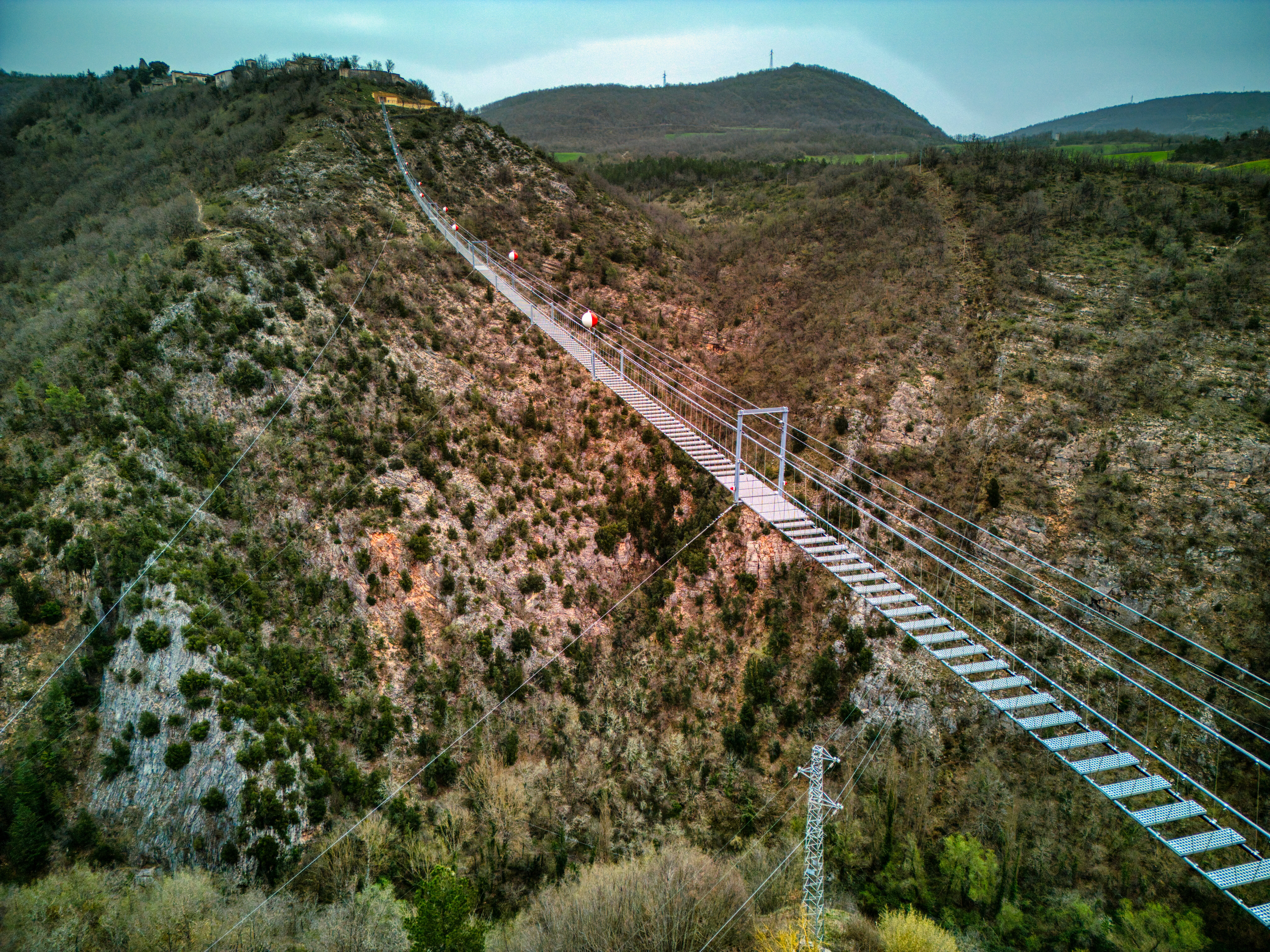
The suspension footbridge

The nature of the surrounding valleys and mountains is varied, and hiking/trekking is popular.

Since 2024, the village has been connected to Montesanto Castle by a 175-metre-high suspension footbridge, claimed to be the highest of its kind in Europe.

== Religion and culture ==
=== Church of San Francesco ===
The church of San Francesco, also known as Madonna della Croce, stands just outside the town of Sellano. It was completed in 1538 and is built of dressed stone with an octagonal plan, featuring a pronaos surmounted by a pediment and an apse with a rectangular layout.

The interior is divided into three naves and contains two 16th-century stucco altars. The high altar displays a 16th-century fresco depicting the Madonna and Child.

=== Other religious heritage ===
The parish church is dedicated to Santa Maria and contains a notable gilded wooden tabernacle.

The patron saint is Saint Giolo of Sellano, whose feast is celebrated on 9 June.

=== Secular buildings ===
The Palazzo Comunale, located near the church of Santa Maria, presents an overall 19th-century arrangement with a 16th-century façade. Inside are traces of 16th-century frescoes. In an upper room there is a fragmentary fresco from the mid-15th century depicting the Madonna and Child with Saints. The building also preserves the so-called piatto dei brevicelli, a repoussé and gilded copper plate dating to the 16th century.

== Notable people ==
Among the people originating from Sellano in the fields of the arts are Domenico Mustafà, a singer, and Edvige Pesce Gorini, a writer and poet.

In the field of history and scholarship, the historian Dario Sabbatucci and the historian and journalist Giovanni Sabbatucci also originated from the town.

In the religious sphere, Giovanni Castellani, a Catholic priest and friar, was from Civitella, Sellano.

The prominent families of Sellano listed in the mid-19th century were the Visitani, Amici, Antonini, Giordani, De Sanctis, and Barnonti.
