= Giovanni Sabbatucci =

Italian historian and journalist (1944–2024)

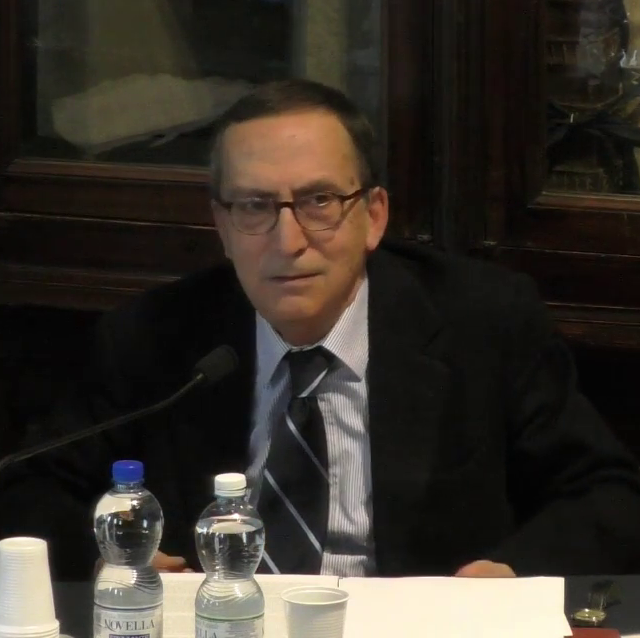
- Sabbatucci in 2015
- Born: 24 August 1944; Sellano, Italy
- Died: 2 December 2024 (aged 80); Rome, Italy
- Education: Sapienza University of Rome
- Occupations: Historian, journalist

Giovanni Sabbatucci (24 August 1944 – 2 December 2024) was an Italian historian, journalist and academic.

== Life and career ==
Born in Sellano on 24 August 1944, Sabbatucci graduated from the Sapienza University of Rome with a degree in history, writing a thesis on Italian irredentism and Italian nationalism supervised by Renzo De Felice. He then became a specialist in Italian history of the 1920s and contemporary history of the Italian Republic. He became a history professor at the University of Macerata and later the Sapienza University of Rome.

From a journalist standpoint, Sabbatucci contributed to multiple newspapers and magazines, such as L'Espresso, Corriere della Sera, Il Messaggero, and Il Mattino. He also participated on radio shows for RAI, Rai 3, and Rai Storia. He also supported the innocence of Sapienza law students Giovanni Scattone and Salvatore Ferraro, accused of fellow law student killing of Marta Russo. Throughout his career, he was considered one of the great specialists on the history of fascism.

Sabbatucci died in Rome on 2 December 2024, at the age of 80.

== Works ==
- Il problema dell'irredentismo e le origini del movimento nazionalista in Italia (1971)
- I combattenti nel primo dopoguerra (1974)
- La crisi italiana del primo dopoguerra. La storia e la critica (1976)
- La stampa del combattentismo (1918-1925) (1979)
- Fascist Institutions: Problems and recent Interpretations (1979)
- Storia del socialismo italiano (1981)
- Il suicidio della classe dirigente liberale (1989)
- Il terremoto del 1919: la riforma elettorale e la crisi del sistema liberale (1991)
- Il riformismo impossibile. Storie del socialismo italiano (1991)
- Storia d'Italia (1994–1999)
- Le riforme elettorali in Italia, 1848-1994 (1995)
- Le generazioni della guerra (1998)
- Miti e storia dell'Italia unita (1999)
- Storia contemporanea (2002)
- Il fallimento del liberalismo e le crisi del primo dopoguerra (2002)
- La Grande Guerra come fattore di divisione (2003)
- Il trasformismo come sistema. Saggio sulla storia politica dell'Italia unita (2003)
- Il mondo contemporaneo. Dal 1848 ad oggi (2004)
- La democrazia liberale e i suoi nemici (2005)
- Edda Ciano e il comunista. L'inconfessabile passione della figlia del Duce (2009)
- Partiti e culture politiche nell'Italia unita (2014)
- Storia contemporanea. Dalla Grande Guerra a oggi (2019)
- Il mondo contemporaneo (2019)
