= Vinessa Vidotto =

American actress (born 1995)

- Born: November 3, 1995 (age 30); Tucson, Arizona, United States
- Education: University of Arizona
- Occupation: Actress
- Years active: 2016–present
- Known for: FBI: International
- Height: 5 ft 5 in (1.65 m)

Vinessa Vidotto (born November 3, 1995) is an American actress. She is best known for her role as FBI Special Agent Cameron Vo on the police procedural television drama series FBI: International.

== Early life and education ==
Vidotto was born on November 3, 1995, in Tucson, Arizona, United States. She is of half-Asian American descent.

She graduated with a Bachelor of Fine Arts from the University of Arizona's Film School of Theatre, Film & Television in 2018. She was a resident assistant during her time at UA.

== Career ==
Vidotto's first acting project was in the short film Piper in the Woods in 2016 as the titular character The Piper.

In 2021, Vidotto appeared on an episode of Hacks. She played the archangel Remiel in four episodes of the television series Lucifer.

In 2022, Vidotto appeared in an episode of the celebrity news program Celebrity Page.

She starred in the series FBI: International as Special Agent Cameron Vo. Vidotto's character started out as a Special Agent on the Fly Team and transitioned to the team's second-in-command in season 3. She has also appeared as a guest on the flagship series FBI as the same character.

== Personal life ==
During her time working as a resident assistant at the University of Arizona, Vidotto experienced several first-hand experiences with calling 911 and working with students experiencing alcohol poisoning and sexual assault. She has also talked a student down from suicide.

== Filmography ==
Year	Title	Role	Notes
2019	Piper in the Woods	The Piper	Short film
2019–21	Lucifer	Remiel	Guest role: 4 episodes
2021	Hacks	Ivy	Episode: "D'Jewelry"
2021–25	FBI: International	Special Agent Cameron Vo	Main role
2023	FBI	Special Agent Cameron Vo	Episode: "Imminent Threat: Part Two"
