= MacGyver (2016 TV series) season 1 =

First season of the television series MacGyver (2016)

MacGyver
- Season 1
- American DVD cover
- Showrunners: Peter M. Lenkov; Craig O'Neill
- Starring: Lucas Till; George Eads; Sandrine Holt; Tristin Mays; Justin Hires; Meredith Eaton
- No. of episodes: 21

Release
- Original network: CBS
- Original release: September 23, 2016 – April 14, 2017

Season chronology
- Next → Season 2

The first season of the action-adventure series MacGyver premiered on September 23, 2016, on CBS, for the 2016–17 American television season. The series centers on the fictional Phoenix Foundation which is a covert organization masquerading as a think tank. The series stars Lucas Till, George Eads, Tristin Mays, and Justin Hires. Sandrine Holt was also cast in the series but departed in the twelfth episode, "Screwdriver". Meredith Eaton replaced Holt, Eaton debuted in the thirteenth episode, "Large Blade," and began receiving main billing in the eighteenth episode, "Flashlight". CBS announced the series on October 1, 2015. It was ordered to series on May 13, 2016, and received a full season order of twenty-two episodes on October 17, 2016. Only twenty-one episodes were produced when the season concluded on April 14, 2017. The season contained a fictional crossover with Hawaii Five-0 which occurred in episode eighteen.

The first season ranked number 27 for the 2016–17 television season, had an average of 9.8 million viewers, and received mostly negative reviews. "The Rising", the series premiere, brought in the most viewers for the season with 10.9 million; meanwhile, the season finale, "Cigar Cutter" brought in 6.57 million. The series was renewed for a second season on March 23, 2017, which later premiered on September 29.

== Cast and characters ==
=== Main ===
- Lucas Till as Angus "Mac" MacGyver
- George Eads as Jack Dalton
- Sandrine Holt as Patricia Thornton
- Tristin Mays as Riley Davis
- Justin Hires as Wilt Bozer
- Meredith Eaton as Matilda "Matty" Webber

=== Recurring ===
- Tracy Spiridakos as Nikki Carpenter

=== Guest ===
- Daniel Dae Kim as Lieutenant Chin Ho Kelly: Crossover character from Hawaii Five-0. A member of the Five-0 Task Force.
- Grace Park as Officer Kono Kalakaua: Crossover character from Hawaii Five-0. A member of the Five-0 Task Force.
- Taylor Wily as Kamekona Tupuola: Crossover character from Hawaii Five-0. An entrepreneur and confidential informant for the Five-0 Task Force.

== Episodes ==
The number in the "No. overall" column refers to the episode's number within the overall series, whereas the number in the "No. in season" column refers to the episode's number within this particular season. The titles of each episode, with the exception of the pilot, are named after a tool on MacGyver's Swiss Army knife. "U.S. viewers (millions)" refers to the number of viewers in the U.S. in millions who watched the episode as it was aired.

No. overall	No. in season	Title	Directed by	Written by	Original release date	Prod. code	U.S. viewers (millions)
1	1	"The Rising"	James Wan	Story by : Peter M. Lenkov & Paul Downs Colaizzo; Teleplay by : Peter M. Lenkov	September 23, 2016	MAC101	10.90
Angus "Mac" MacGyver, with help from Jack Dalton and Nikki Carpenter, infiltrates a party to steal a biological weapon. As Mac and Jack meet up with Nikki, they find her held hostage by John Kendrick. Mac gives up the bio-weapon, but Kendrick shoots both him and Nikki, killing her. Three months later, Mac is on holiday when his boss, Patricia Thornton of the Department of External Services (DXS), calls him and Jack back to help retrieve the bio-weapon. They recruit convicted hacker and Riley Davis, who tracks Kendrick to San Francisco, where they also discover that Nikki is alive and working with him. After capturing them, Mac finds out that Nikki has sold the bio-weapon to someone who plans on making it airborne via an IED. Mac finds the bio-weapon and extracts it from the IED before it explodes. A few days later, Thornton tells the group that Nikki's betrayal caused the DXS to become public, so they have to shut down and relocate under a new name. Mac chooses the name Phoenix, to which the rest of the group agrees. Nikki is arrested by the FBI but disappears during transport, leaving the cuffs behind with a hairpin.
2	2	"Metal Saw"	Jerry Levine	Craig O'Neill	September 30, 2016	MAC102	9.07
In the two weeks since Nikki escaped FBI custody, MacGyver has been going to Nikki's apartment trying to find something that will lead him to her. The team gets an assignment to rescue Sarah Adler (Amy Acker), Jack's former partner and ex-girlfriend from the CIA who has been disavowed due to being captured. Sarah's capture comes on the heels of her stealing an arms dealer's ledger. Together, the team retrieves both Sarah and the ledger while also taking down the dealer. Sarah is reunited with her fiancé. At the end of the episode, Mac finds a secret compartment at Nikki's apartment containing a passport for her alias. Meanwhile, Riley meets with her parole officer and has Wilt Bozer portray her boyfriend. In exchange, she agrees to give him one digit of her phone number each week.
3	3	"Awl"	Matt Earl Beesley	David Slack	October 7, 2016	MAC103	8.09
A terrorist group known as D-77 is planning an attack. The group's financials are managed by a guy named Ralph Kastrati (Oliver Cooper), who is wanted by the FBI for several accounts of securities fraud and lives in Malaysia. The team goes to secretly collect Ralph, who then gets shot by D-77. MacGyver, using items found in Ralph's SUV (including parts of the SUV itself), saves Ralph's life. Later on, in order to prevent D-77 from killing Ralph, MacGyver lowers Ralph's heart rate until his pulse cannot be felt, giving him the appearance of death. Before D-77 can kill him, however, Mac and Jack rescue Ralph, who willingly testifies about D-77 and will be put in witness protection. At home, Mac acts as the monster for Bozer's movie and Riley helps out with the CGI software. Jack tells Mac to contact his father, as he has not talked to him in a long time. Mac decides to write his father a letter.
4	4	"Wire Cutter"	Joe Dante	John Turman	October 14, 2016	MAC104	7.44
An agent of the Phoenix Foundation is killed after discovering an old Soviet bomb is being held by Vladimir Sevchenko, a Russian extremist who wants to restart the Cold War. Riley discovers that the bomb uses its own unique operating system. While Thornton goes to find Sevchenko's whereabouts, the team searches for the programmer behind the bomb's code, a man named Alexander Orlov (Elya Baskin), and his handler who knew the passwords to disable it, Victor Levkin (Olek Krupa). Orlov and Levkin share similar qualities to Mac and Jack, respectively. The group goes to Russia to collect an old computer needed to interface with the bomb, but Orlov is kidnapped by Sevchenko's men in the process. The group meets with Thornton to save Orlov, but the computer's keyboard is damaged and Levkin is mortally wounded. Mac improvises a keyboard replacement, the bomb is deactivated and Sevchenko is defeated. Orlov is thanked and returned to his retirement home, where he and Riley connect over The Price Is Right. Meanwhile, Thornton goes to tell the dead agent's family about her death and Mac and Jack discuss how Mac is secretly still searching for Nikki.
5	5	"Toothpick"	Bobby Roth	Nancy Kiu	October 21, 2016	MAC105	7.95
The Phoenix Foundation gets a tip that Nikki was spotted in Portugal, Mac and Jack stake out her supposed apartment. They find a woman who Nikki sent to give MacGyver a key. Mac and Jack are called to meet Riley in Germany. The trio are tasked with protecting Katarina Wagner (Kasha Kropinski), who discovered her boss was selling weapons to U.S. enemies. Katarina received an email from an Interpol agent to take a train to Frankfurt, but the agent was killed before the email was sent. The trio protect Katarina on the train while Thornton confronts the boss, Eric Wexler (Jarreth J. Merz). Wexler sends a group of men to kill Katarina on the train, but they are thwarted. The men destroy the train's console, as well as the braking and coupling systems, so the train will crash into the station. Mac, using a flare, rust, and magnesium, separates the head of the train from passenger cars, saving everyone. Thornton arrests Wexler. Back at home, Bozer flirts with Riley hoping to get more digits of Riley's phone number. MacGyver tries Nikki's key, but it doesn't fit anywhere. He decides to wear it as a necklace until she is captured.
6	6	"Wrench"	Alec Smight	Brian Durkin	October 28, 2016	MAC106	7.27
Mac's internal demons get externalized when The Ghost (Niko Nicotera) resurfaces. Five years prior, his bombs killed Mac's old C.O., Alfred Pena (Lobo Sebastian), who was supposed to be on leave to see the birth of his daughter. When Jack finds himself in a similar experience, Mac must overcome his past to defeat his rival and save Jack.
7	7	"Can Opener"	Omar Madha	Sean Hennen	November 4, 2016	MAC107	7.59
The leader of a Mexican drug cartel, Joaquin "El Noche" Sancola (Raoul Trujillo), is kept in a prison in Texas. However, as a result, other members of the cartel have taken over and have started to cause violence in public. Mac is sent to the prison as a convict and must break El Noche out in order to find the cartel's hideout. However, he must do it with little help, as Jack has been reassigned to guard another part of the prison and Riley cannot hack the prison doors.
8	8	"Corkscrew"	Janice Cooke	Lindsey Allen	November 11, 2016	MAC108	7.65
When Nikki sends an assassin to take out Mac and the rest of the team, Bozer learns who Mac and the others really are. Mac must outlast the killer who is attempting to kill him in a junkyard and save the others. When the killer is apprehended, he identifies himself as Murdoc (David Dastmalchian). Nikki meets Mac at a diner and warns him that more killers will come. She also tells him he'll soon need to use the Portugal key. Mac returns the favor by threatening to go after her family, demonstrating how Nikki's actions have permanently changed him.
9	9	"Chisel"	Brad Tanenbaum	Bret VandenBos & Brandon Willer	November 18, 2016	MAC109	8.12
Mac and the team head to Latvia to capture Jānis Lapa (Tobias Jelinek), the leader of a terrorist organization. However, Jānis sends an S.O.S out to the other members, who chase Mac, Jānis, and the team to Latvia's U.S. Embassy. The team must protect the embassy from the terrorists for six hours. Meanwhile, Bozer, still upset at MacGyver, is held at the Phoenix Foundation to be assessed by Thornton. After learning about Bozer's prosthetic-making abilities, Thornton allows Mac to give Bozer a job at the Phoenix Foundation, which Bozer accepts.
10	10	"Pliers"	Lee Rose	Brian Durkin	December 9, 2016	MAC110	7.42
The team visit MacGyver and Bozer's hometown. They go to MacGyver's old middle school, Mission City Junior High, so MacGyver can give a talk to a class taught by his former science teacher, Arthur Ericson (John Heard). They meet a young genius named Valerie Lawson (Amiah Miller) who has much in common with MacGyver and who MacGyver and the team later need to rescue after she is kidnapped.
11	11	"Scissors"	Stephen Herek	Lindsay Allen and Nancy Kiu	December 16, 2016	MAC111	7.67
Christmas is in danger when the NSA is hacked and Riley is the main suspect. After finding out that she did it to save her kidnapped mother Diane (Michael Michele), she confesses to stealing a cyber weapon, able to remotely control vehicles. Riley, MacGyver and Jack head to Shanghai before the weapon can be used and result in World War III. It is later revealed why Riley was sent to prison, as well as the reason of her animosity toward Jack.
12	12	"Screwdriver"	Craig Siebels	Story by : Peter M. Lenkov; Teleplay by : Craig O'Neill and David Slack	January 6, 2017	MAC112	8.42
Sarah Adler returns and has found Nikki, enlisting the team to help bring her in for her crimes. However, Nikki claims she is actually working for the CIA in an effort to bring down the Organization. Mac, Jack, Sarah, and Nikki attempt to set up a sting to draw out a government mole working for the Organization, while Riley and Bozer visit Murdoc for more information. The team is brought back by Thornton, and is led to believe that Nikki lied to them again; however Riley and Bozer find evidence that proves that Nikki was telling the truth. They later discover that the mole is within the Phoenix Foundation, and is Patricia Thornton. MacGyver asks if Nikki is staying but she says she cannot stay, not until the job is finished. Note: This is the final episode to feature Sandrine Holt as a main cast member.
13	13	"Large Blade"	Sylvain White	Andrew Karlsruher	January 13, 2017	MAC113	7.64
When the helicopter carrying Mac and Jack is shot down in Kazakhstan, injuring the pilot and allowing a war criminal to escape, Mac must recapture him before he calls in reinforcements. Also, the team meets Matilda "Matty" Webber (Meredith Eaton), the new director of the Phoenix Foundation who happens to be Jack's tough ex-boss whom he monikered "Matilda The Hun". Mac builds a lightning rod and uses electricity from a lightning bolt to recharge their emergency phone and engineer their rescue.
14	14	"Fish Scaler"	Eagle Egilsson	Story by : John Turman; Teleplay by : Craig O'Neill and David Slack	February 3, 2017	MAC114	7.43
Mac and Jack track down FBI fugitive Douglas Bishop (Frank Whaley), who claims that he was forced to work for a dirty agent. The two must protect the fugitive while the team figures out who the dirty FBI agent is. Meanwhile, Bozer and Riley must meet with Matty for their first evaluations.
15	15	"Magnifying Glass"	Stephen Herek	Brian Durkin	February 10, 2017	MAC115	8.02
In San Francisco Park, Matty's (Meredith Eaton) Goddaughter named Vanessa Frank, and her boyfriend named Daniel Lee were killed in the middle of the night by Zodiac. Mac & his team investigate the crime about suspect 1960s/1970s Zodiac Killer returned in San Francisco when Mac finds footprint by using electrostatic dust print lifter & WIFI signal radio waves. The killer is later revealed to be working under the tutelage of a Dr. Madison Gray, who has been communicating with him from Oahu. Jack proceeds to give an old friend of his who works on some task force in Hawaii a call about their findings.
16	16	"Hook"	Tawnia McKiernan	Nancy Kiu	February 17, 2017	MAC116	7.24
Mac and Jack track down a dangerous fugitive who gets captured by the Coltons, a notorious family of bounty hunters (Sheryl Lee Ralph, Javicia Leslie, Lance Gross, & Jermaine Rivers). After the Coltons get the upper hand on Mac and Jack several times, a Foundation team retrieves the fugitive from them, while Mac, Jack, Bozer, and Riley end up saving the Coltons from their homicidal criminal employers. Meanwhile, Bozer & Riley unsuccessfully try to hack Jack's CIA file about his history with Matty.
17	17	"Ruler"	Antonio Negret	Andrew Karlsruher	February 24, 2017	MAC117	6.93
The team travels to the Netherlands and becomes disavowed by the Phoenix Foundation after the fallout from a mission designed to entrap them – a contingency activated by Patricia Thornton under her codename: Chrysalis.
18	18	"Flashlight"	Jonathan Brown	Lindsay Allen	March 10, 2017	MAC118	7.73
The team reroutes to Hilo, Hawaii, as volunteers for Earthquake Relief with FEMA. Jack and MacGyver meet Kono (Grace Park) and Chin (Daniel Dae Kim) from the Five-0 Task Force; Jack tells them about knowing Steve McGarrett. They rescue a group of government scientists trapped in a building by using a water jet and a radar gun. A Chinese group uses the chaos as a distraction, aiming to steal a top-secret weapon called "Project 23" from the building. Meanwhile, Wilt works with Kamekona (Taylor Wily) to return a lost dog to its owner. Note : This episode is a crossover with Hawaii Five-0. This is the first episode to feature Meredith Eaton as a main cast member.
19	19	"Compass"	Christine Moore	Lee David Zlotoff	March 31, 2017	MAC119	6.56
Mac receives a phone call from Smitty about the passing of a college friend, Frankie (Aly Michalka), and heads to Boston to attend her memorial service. Jack joins him for moral support and they discover suspicious circumstances surrounding her death. While investigating, they learn Frankie faked her death, as someone was coming after her in order to suppress her groundbreaking scientific research.
20	20	"Hole Puncher"	Elizabeth Allen Rosenbaum	Craig O'Neill & David Slack	April 7, 2017	MAC120	6.62
When the team intercepts a terror group's message for Murdoc, instructing him to kill a tech analyst, Mac poses as a psychopath to save the intended victim. However, when Riley looks into the analyst's files, the team discovers that the terror group knew about Murdoc being caught. The team realizes that the terror group is actually the Organization, who has set a trap for Mac. Jack arrives in time to stop the Organization's kill squad from killing Mac and they capture a man named Daniel, who later states that he wanted to be caught. Meanwhile, Bozer and Riley attempt to find evidence that will allow the police to arrest a man for murder on behalf of the victim's parents.
21	21	"Cigar Cutter"	Stephen Herek	Story by : Craig O'Neill & David Slack; Teleplay by : Peter M. Lenkov	April 14, 2017	MAC121	6.57
Macgyver receives the letter he sent to his father in "Awl," as his father's whereabouts are unknown. Jack tries to distract Mac by celebrating the 3-year anniversary of their surviving the Cairo mission. Their day off is interrupted by Murdoc's hiring a killer to infiltrate the Phoenix Foundation as a lab technician named Dr. Zito (Mark Sheppard). Upon getting inside, Zito wounds Bozer and releases Daniel Holt so that the two can take control of the Phoenix Foundation. The team works to take out Zito and Holt and restore power, while also preventing The Organization from stealing the bio-weapon from "The Rising." After stopping Zito, Holt, and The Organization, MacGyver decides to dispose of the bio-weapon in Siberia. Mac and Jack then go on a road trip to find Mac's father. Murdoc escapes from prison.

=== Crossover ===
The fifteenth episode of the season, "Magnifying Glass", placed the series in the same fictional universe as Hawaii Five-0 when the fictional Five-0 Task Force and multiple characters were mentioned. The eighteenth episode, "Flashlight" featured guest appearances by Hawaii Five-0 actors Daniel Dae Kim, Grace Park, and Taylor Wily as Lieutenant Chin Ho Kelly, Officer Kono Kalakaua, and Kamekona Tupuola, respectively. The Phoenix Foundation was subsequently mentioned in the Hawaii Five-0 seventh season episode "Puka 'Ana" which aired immediately following "Flashlight".

== Production ==
=== Development ===
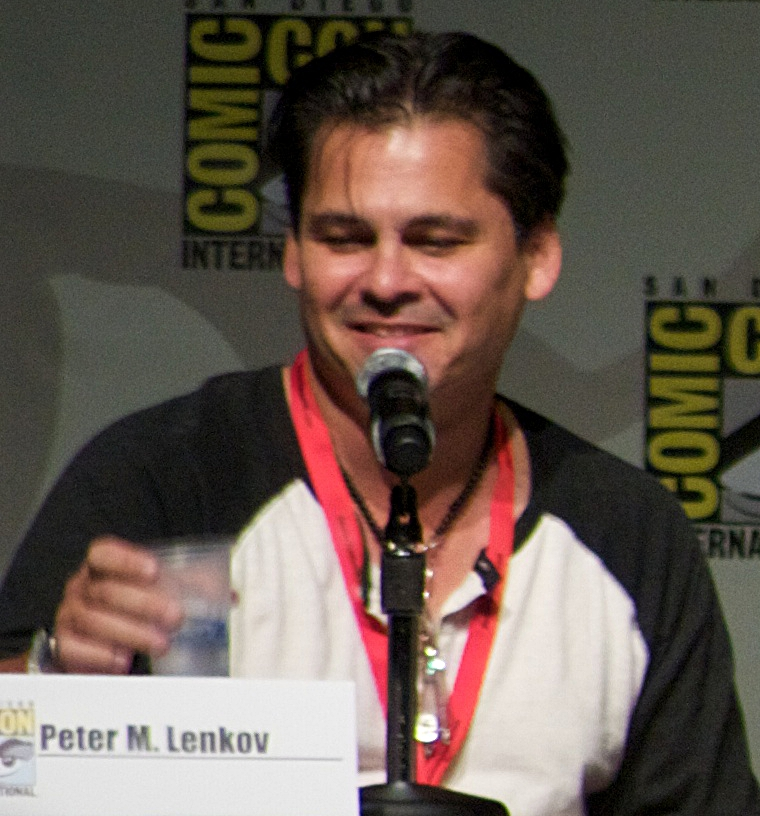
After the original pilot idea was scrapped Peter M. Lenkov joined the series as an executive producer and showrunner to "revamp" the series.

On October 1, 2015, it was announced that CBS had plans to reboot MacGyver and had reportedly agreed to a put pilot. It was reported that R. Scott Gemmill and James Wan would write and direct the pilot, respectively. Henry Winkler, along with Gemmill and Wan were also set to executive produce the series. Wan pulled from directing in March 2016 due to scheduling conflicts, David Von Ancken was announced as the new director while Wan remained as executive producer of the series. It was also reported that Gemmill had backed from the series all together, Paul Downs Colaizzo and Brett Mahoney were announced as the new writers. In addition, Ancken, Michael Clear, Colaizzo, Mahony, as well as original series creator Lee David Zlotoff all signed on as executive producers. On May 13, 2016, it was reported that CBS had given a series order for MacGyver. It was later announced in June 2016 that the original pilot idea had been scrapped; the series was recast and Peter M. Lenkov, who also developed the 2010 reboot of Hawaii Five-O for the network, had signed on to "revamp" the series.

Title card for the first season. Subsequent seasons featured a different title card after the opening sequence was redesigned.

As part of the revamp Ancken was also pulled from the series and James Wan was once again announced as the director. Lenkov was also announced to be taking over as showrunner of the series. Lionsgate Television also signed on to produce the series along with CBS Television Studios. When CBS revealed its fall schedule it was revealed that the series would premiere on September 23, 2016. On October 17, 2016, the series was given a full series order of twenty-two episodes but only twenty-one were produced. On March 23, 2017, CBS renewed the series for a second season and the first season concluded April 14, 2017.

=== Filming ===
Possible filming locations for the pilot originally included Portland, Oregon. Ultimately the pilot was filmed in Los Angeles, California. Following production of the pilot production moved to Atlanta, Georgia, filming at Mailing Avenue Stageworks in Chosewood Park. Portions of the episode "Flashlight" was filmed in Oahu, Hawaii, on the set of Hawaii Five-0.

=== Casting ===
On March 8, 2016, George Eads was the first to be cast as Lincoln. It was revealed on March 21, 2016, that Lucas Till and Joshua Boone had been cast as Angus MacGyver and Gunner, respectively. Later cast were Addison Timlin and Michelle Krusiec as Mickey and Department of Homeland Security Agent Croix. In June 2016 it was announced that the pilot episode was being re-shot and that Eads and Till would be the only cast members to remain. In addition, Eads role was changed to play former CIA Agent Jack Dalton. As part of the recasting of the series Justin Hires was announced to be playing Wilt Bozer. For the reboot, the role of Peter Thornton from the original series was changed to a woman instead named Patricia Thornton, the role went to Sandrine Holt. Last to be cast was Tristin Mays as Riley Davis. Holt departed the series mid season following the twelfth episode. Ahead of the thirteenth episode it was announced that Meredith Eaton had been cast to replace Holt as Matty Webber, Eaton debuted as a guest star and began receiving main billing in episode eighteen. Recurring cast for the season includes Tracy Spiridakos as Nikki Carpenter. Meanwhile, Daniel Dae Kim, Grace Park, and Taylor Wily all appeared in an episode as their respective Hawaii Five-0 characters.

== Reception ==
=== Critical reception ===
Rotten Tomatoes, a review aggregator website, gives the series an average rating of 4.11 out of 10 based on thirty-six reviews. Meanwhile, Metacritic, which uses a weighted average, gives the series a 38 based on twenty-six reviews indicating "generally unfavorable" reviews. Tyler McCarthy with Den of Geek! stated about the pilot "The MacGyver reboot is the backwards product of nostalgia colliding with modernization". When reviewing both MacGyver and the Lethal Weapon TV adaption Maureen Ryan with Variety said "Lucas Till's performance as the title character misses the mark completely" and that "Both programs seem like broken relics from a time capsule". Daniel Fienberg from The Hollywood Reporter says "Despite a blockbuster director at the helm, it's a shoddy product made out of the sort of ill-fitting bits and bobs that Angus MacGyver himself might fashion into a bomb". Following the season finale Matt Webb Mitovich of TVLine stated "I find the five-person cast a bit claustrophobic, and I’m on record as not being a fan of new boss Matty Webber".

=== Awards and nominations ===
As part of the Creative Arts Emmy Awards at the 69th Primetime Creative Arts Emmy Awards, stunt coordinator Jeff Wolfe was nominated for an Emmy Award in "Outstanding Stunt Coordination for a Drama Series, Limited Series, or Movie"; the award was won by James Lew for Luke Cage. Keith Power, a composer for the series, received a BMI Award for his work on the series. At the 43rd People's Choice Awards the series as a whole was nominated for a People's Choice Award for Favorite New TV Drama, but the award was won by This Is Us.

=== Viewing figures ===
Viewership and ratings per episode of MacGyver (2016 TV series) season 1
No.	Title	Air date	Rating/share (18–49)	Viewers (millions)	DVR (18–49)	DVR viewers (millions)	Total (18–49)	Total viewers (millions)
1	"The Rising"	September 23, 2016	1.7/8	10.90	0.9	3.38	2.6	14.11
2	"Metal Saw"	September 30, 2016	1.3/6	9.07	0.8	2.82	2.1	11.89
3	"Awl"	October 7, 2016	1.1/5	8.09	0.7	2.36	1.8	10.42
4	"Wire Cutter"	October 14, 2016	1.1/5	7.44	—N/a	—N/a	—N/a	—N/a
5	"Toothpick"	October 21, 2016	1.1/5	7.95	—N/a	—N/a	—N/a	—N/a
6	"Wrench"	October 28, 2016	0.9/4	7.27	—N/a	—N/a	—N/a	—N/a
7	"Can Opener"	November 4, 2016	1.1/5	7.59	—N/a	1.46	—N/a	9.05^{1}
8	"Corkscrew"	November 11, 2016	1.1/4	7.65	—N/a	1.67	—N/a	9.32^{1}
9	"Chisel"	November 18, 2016	1.1/5	8.12	—N/a	1.57	—N/a	9.69^{1}
10	"Pliers"	December 9, 2016	1.0/4	7.42	—N/a	2.04	—N/a	9.46
11	"Scissors"	December 16, 2016	1.0/4	7.67	0.5	2.04	1.5	9.71
12	"Screwdriver"	January 6, 2017	1.2/4	8.42	—N/a	1.72	—N/a	10.14^{1}
13	"Large Blade"	January 13, 2017	1.1/5	7.64	0.6	1.95	1.7	9.59
14	"Fish Scaler"	February 3, 2017	1.0/4	7.43	—N/a	2.15	—N/a	9.58
15	"Magnifying Glass"	February 10, 2017	1.2/5	8.02	—N/a	1.65	—N/a	9.67^{1}
16	"Hook"	February 17, 2017	0.9/4	7.24	—N/a	—N/a	—N/a	—N/a
17	"Ruler"	February 24, 2017	1.1/5	6.93	—N/a	—N/a	—N/a	—N/a
18	"Flashlight"	March 10, 2017	1.0/4	7.73	0.6	2.25	1.6	10.02
19	"Compass"	March 31, 2017	0.9/4	6.56	—N/a	—N/a	—N/a	—N/a
20	"Hole Puncher"	April 7, 2017	0.9/4	6.62	—N/a	1.99	—N/a	8.61
21	"Cigar Cutter"	April 14, 2017	0.8/4	6.57	0.5	1.74	1.3	8.32

^1 Live +7 ratings were not available, so Live +3 ratings have been used instead.

== Home video release ==
MacGyver season 1
Set details	Special features	
21 episodes; 5-disc set; 1.78:1 aspect ratio; Languages: English (Dolby Digital 5.1, with subtitles); Subtitles in English	N/A	
DVD release dates
Region 1	Region 2	Region 4
February 27, 2018	N/A	N/A
