= MacGyver (2016 TV series) season 2 =

MacGyver
- Season 2
- Showrunners: Peter M. Lenkov; Craig O'Neill
- Starring: Lucas Till; George Eads; Tristin Mays; Justin Hires; Meredith Eaton; Isabel Lucas
- No. of episodes: 23

Release
- Original network: CBS
- Original release: September 29, 2017 – May 4, 2018

Season chronology
- ← Previous; Season 1 Next → Season 3

The second season of the CBS action-adventure series MacGyver premiered on September 29, 2017 for the 2017–18 television season. The series centers on the fictional Phoenix Foundation which is a covert organization masquerading as a think tank. The series stars Lucas Till, George Eads, Tristin Mays, and Justin Hires. CBS announced the series on March 23, 2017 for a twenty-three episode second season.

== Cast and characters ==
=== Main ===
- Lucas Till as Angus "Mac" MacGyver
- George Eads as Jack Dalton
- Tristin Mays as Riley Davis
- Justin Hires as Wilt Bozer
- Meredith Eaton as Matilda "Matty" Webber
- Isabel Lucas as Samantha Cage

=== Recurring ===
- Aina Dumlao as Andie Lee
- David Dastmalchian as Murdoc
- Lauren Vélez as Cassandra Glover
- Reign Edwards as Leanna Martin
- William Baldwin as Elwood Davis
- Lance Gross as Billy Colton

=== Guest ===
- Daniella Alonso as Dr. Alejandra Rose
- Ashley Tisdale as Allie Winthrop
- Amy Smart as Dixie/Dawn
- Garrett Morris as Willy
- Kamar De Los Reyes as Captain Delarosa
- Diogo Morgado as Carlos

== Episodes ==
The number in the "No. overall" column refers to the episode's number within the overall series, whereas the number in the "No. in season" column refers to the episode's number within this particular season. "U.S. viewers (millions)" refers to the number of viewers in the U.S. in millions who watched the episode as it was aired.

No. overall	No. in season	Title	Directed by	Written by	Original release date	Prod. code	U.S. viewers (millions)
22	1	"DIY or DIE"	Stephen Herek	Peter M. Lenkov & Craig O'Neill & David Slack	September 29, 2017	MAC201	6.69
Bozer has recently been released from the hospital due to his injuries from last season and Mac and Jack have recently returned after trying to find both Murdoc and Mac's father, to no avail. Mac does find his father's old watch, though. CIA agent Samantha Cage (Isabel Lucas) requests the Phoenix Foundation's help in an off-the-books mission to recover a SEAL officer who's been kidnapped for the past two years. They rescue the officer but, because of her policy violations, Cage is dishonorably discharged from the CIA. Matty hires Cage for the Phoenix Foundation. After their mission, Mac finds a photo of himself in his father's watch, taken the day his father left.
23	2	"Muscle Car + Paper Clip"	Ericson Core	Nancy Kiu	October 6, 2017	MAC203	6.38
Riley hesitates when she holds someone at gunpoint, causing a thief to escape with a portable EMP device. Jack takes the blame for it, but gets worried when Riley has to go on a solo operation involving a group of hackers known as Bedlam. While Riley tries to slow Bedlam down, Mac and Cage work on saving the US Secretary of Defense, whose pacemaker has been hacked.
24	3	"Roulette Wheel + Wire"	Duane Clark	Justin Lisson	October 13, 2017	MAC202	6.74
Mac, Jack, Riley, Bozer and Samantha all head to a casino in Azerbaijan, where a terrorist group is using its vault to hide diamonds which are suspected to be part of a WMD purchase. The team foils the plot and isolates the terrorists, but not before the WMD, a nuclear bomb, is armed. Mac then has 15 minutes to open the locked vault and seal the bomb inside it.
25	4	"X-Ray + Penny"	Bethany Rooney	Craig O'Neill & David Slack	October 20, 2017	MAC204	6.77
Following a trip to France to investigate a lead on finding his father, Mac returns home and is soon abducted by Murdoc's henchmen and held captive by Murdoc. After beginning to torture a drugged Mac, Murdoc leaves the room briefly, allowing him to escape. Samantha puts Mac through a memory reviving process to get details about the location of Murdoc's torture room, but Murdoc is gone by the time the Phoenix team arrives.
26	5	"Skull + Electromagnet"	Liz Allen Rosenbaum	Lindsey Allen	October 27, 2017	MAC205	6.45
A group of soldiers, including the vice president's son, has their jet go down with a mysterious prisoner on board. Mac correctly deduces that the plane crashed on Goat Island in the Bermuda Triangle, the same site where an entire Navy regiment vanished long ago. The team works to locate the survivors while dealing with the dangerous escaped prisoner, later identified as former CIA agent-turned-traitor Harper Hayes (Jeananne Goossen).
27	6	"Jet Engine + Pickup Truck"	Stephen Herek	Andrew Karlsruher	November 3, 2017	MAC206	7.09
In Nigeria, a group of rebels ignites the wellhead of an oil pipeline, causing a fire. While Riley and Bozer protect a nearby village from burning up, Mac, Jack, and Cage work on evading the rebels and putting out the fire. Although the mission is successful, Riley and Bozer face possible disciplinary action for disobeying Matty's order to evacuate.
28	7	"Duct Tape + Jack"	Gabriel Beristain	Brian Durkin	November 10, 2017	MAC207	7.27
In Ecuador, Presidential Candidate Hector León (Joseph Castillo-Midyett) is in dire need of a heart transplant, or else the country will become a police-state under Colonel Zarate (Joseph Melendez). While Riley and Cage work on protecting León and preparing him for the surgery, Mac and Jack work on transporting the heart and surgeon Alejandra Rosa (Daniella Alonso) safely to the hospital and avoiding Zarate's soldiers. Meanwhile, there's a robbery at Jack's apartment. Bozer gets help from Phoenix forensics expert Jill in recovering Jack's things, including Jack's father's dog tags.
29	8	"Packing Peanuts + Fire"	Stacey K. Black	Lindsey Allen	November 17, 2017	MAC208	7.17
The Phoenix Foundation has gained intel on an art dealer named Lemaire who sells rare stolen pieces to fund terrorist groups. Mac and Jack steal an original Franz Marc painting, The Tower of Blue Horses, in order to gain an audience with him, but are conned out of it when dealing with Lemaire's contact. The team, minus Bozer, is able to recover the painting and arrest Lemaire. Meanwhile, Matty enrolls Bozer in a training program for new government agents which he is required to complete as a Phoenix agent. While at training, he discovers a spy selling information about the agent trainees. Also, Riley's dad, Elwood (William Baldwin), meets with her in order to reconnect. Riley is reluctant to do so and keeps this development from Jack, whom she now considers a father figure.
30	9	"CD-ROM + Hoagie Foil"	Bobby Roth	Marqui Jackson & Nancy Kiu	December 1, 2017	MAC209	6.61
The team infiltrates a terrorist group planning to deploy a canister of nerve gas. Cage is caught by the group and concocts a cover story while trying to convince them that the canister they possess is fake. Thus, Mac is required to create a look-alike canister while he and Jack make plans to recover the original. Elsewhere, Bozer tries to pass an interrogation test at the training center, causing him to confront a painful childhood memory. After Riley tells Jack about her father, Jack watches them from afar and finds out that someone wants to kill Elwood. At the end of the episode, Mac views a videotape he found in his father’s burned house. As the song “Father and Son” plays in the background, he discovers a reflection of Matty watching him as a child with his father. He begins to wonder if she is involved in his disappearance.
31	10	"War Room + Ship"	Tawnia McKiernan	Brian Durkin & Andrew Karlsruher	December 8, 2017	MAC210	7.21
Jack finds out from Elwood that, a year ago, Elwood and his partner stole a baseball signed by Jackie Robinson worth 75 thousand dollars. However, Elwood threw the ball into the Hudson when he decided to reform, forgetting to tell his partner. Jack finds out that the person who wants to kill Elwood is the old partner. With help from Riley, they make a fake baseball to give to the partner. At the same time, a ship with 31 students and a teacher named Zoe Kimura (Amy Okuda) is stuck in the Arctic Ocean. MacGyver helps the teacher save the ship while they wait for the coast guard. Unfortunately, a break in the ship’s hull requires the teacher to sacrifice herself. Meanwhile, Bozer and Leanna wake up handcuffed to each other in a hotel room. They must work together to return to the Operative Training Center and pass their final test, which they do, only to learn they must now go their separate ways and never communicate with each other again.
32	11	"Bullet + Pen"	Carlos Bernard	Marqui Jackson	December 15, 2017	MAC211	6.87
At the company Christmas party, Mac is arrested by LAPD's Detective Greer (guest star Bruce McGill, Jack Dalton in the original series) for setting off an improvised bomb at a warehouse. Although Jack swears he cleared the building, the dead body of a maintenance man was found in the rubble. To get Mac out of jail without blowing the cover of the Phoenix Foundation, the team must deconstruct the event and prove the maintenance man was already dead before being discarded in the warehouse at a later time. After Cage returns home, she is met in her apartment by Murdoc, who shoots her and leaves her for dead.
33	12	"Mac + Jack"	Ron Underwood	Story by : Peter M. Lenkov; Teleplay by : Craig O'Neill & David Slack	January 5, 2018	MAC212	7.83
The group figures out Cage is in danger and they rush her to a hospital, staying the entire night until getting word that she will recover. Upon returning to his house with Jack, Mac finds that the house has been rigged with explosives. Seeing a unique combination of triggering device and explosive material, Mac uses his knowledge of the Ghost's patterns to deduce that the bomb in his house was set to distract authorities from an even larger bomb in downtown Los Angeles. Flashbacks reveal how Mac and Jack met in Afghanistan and how their initial hostility bloomed into true friendship.
34	13	"CO2 Sensor + Tree Branch"	Brad Turner	Story by : Timothy J. Lea; Teleplay by : Adam Beechen	January 12, 2018	MAC213	8.14
While Jack attends his high school reunion to seek revenge on his rival Jimmy (Eddie McClintock) for beating him out for Homecoming King, Mac and the others compete in a drone vehicle competition designed to help injured soldiers get transported off the battlefield safely. Mac runs into an old flame of his, Allie Winthrop (Ashley Tisdale), who once stole the schematics for his first drone. When Allie's drone, Bruno, is hacked and starts racing toward the Pentagon, Mac, Allie, and Bozer must stop it before F-22 jets destroy the drone with Allie trapped inside. Jack realizes that losing the crown was what inspired him to join the Army, CIA, and Phoenix.
35	14	"Mardi Gras Beads + Chair"	Mike Martinez	Story by : Brian Durkin; Teleplay by : Marqui Jackson & Andrew Karlsruher	January 19, 2018	MAC214	7.68
Matty learns that Duke Jacoby, one of Jack's aliases from his time as a CIA agent, has resurfaced. She and Mac accompany Jack to New Orleans and encounter a woman named Dixie (Amy Smart) who is pretending to be Duke's wife and has stumbled upon 16 other CIA aliases. Meanwhile, Riley discovers that Bozer has been using a secure Phoenix communication channel to converse with Leanna.
36	15	"Murdoc + Handcuffs"	Stephen Herek	Marqui Jackson	February 2, 2018	MAC215	7.27
One of Murdoc's hired assassins offers Murdoc to the Phoenix Foundation in exchange for $10 million. However, the team runs into trouble after acquiring Murdoc, learning that his mentor Nicholas Helman (guest star Michael Des Barres, Murdoc in the original series) is hell-bent on revenge and searching for him. After Mac, Jack, and Murdoc successfully fend off Helman, Murdoc is allowed to see his son before being imprisoned again, but he and his son escape.
37	16	"Hammock + Balcony"	Eagle Egilsson	Justin Lisson	March 2, 2018	MAC216	6.93
The Phoenix Foundation is asked by the CIA and Interpol to capture a Serbian war criminal, but the only way to find him is through his son, who recently married an American woman with a known social media presence. Upon learning of the couple's honeymoon at an exclusive winery resort in France, Matty sets up Bozer and Riley as a fake honeymoon couple, along with Mac and, to Bozer's shock, Leanna. Bozer and Leanna wonder if Matty knows of their secret communications. The initial plan is to interrogate the son to find out his father's location, but plans change when the son admits to killing his brother to become his father's right-hand man. Meanwhile, Jack enlists Riley's father and Jill from the Phoenix Foundation to help him break into Matty's house and steal something from her safe. Jack later talks to Mac about what they found and Mac realizes that Matty did know his father and lied to him.
38	17	"Bear Trap + Mob Boss"	Steven A. Adelson	Nancy Kiu	March 9, 2018	MAC217	6.61
As Mac, Jack, Riley, and Bozer meet to discuss Matty's files and Mac's dad, Matty sends Mac, Jack, and Riley to capture a man who has flipped on his Ukrainian mob boss. The chase leads them to the sealed site of the Chernobyl disaster. They find a group that is smuggling out nuclear waste, which can be sold on the black market and turned into dirty bombs. At home, Matty asks Bozer to investigate who broke into her house. Bozer slows his investigation and tries to cover anything that would lead to his friends, even though he suspects Matty already knows who the culprit is. Throughout the episode, there is tension between Mac and Matty because he knows that she lied to him about not knowing his father. Mac asks the group to put off confronting Matty, believing it isn't the right time yet.
39	18	"Riley + Airplane"	Antonio Negret	Lindsey Allen	March 30, 2018	MAC218	6.43
Matty sends Mac, Jack, and Riley to track down a traitor named Emil Beck by first locating one of Beck's recent contract associates, Owen Palmer. In doing so, the team reconnects with the Colton family of bounty hunters, who are chasing the huge bounty on Beck's head for other crimes he's committed. After some initial hostilities, the teams agree to work together when Matty assures the Coltons they will get paid. They capture Palmer, who gives up information on Beck and is then transported on a commercial jet back to Los Angeles with Riley and Billy Colton guarding him. Mac and Jack then capture Beck, only to learn that what he stole is electronic coding to bring down any airplane. They arrive too late to stop him from sabotaging one jet as a demonstration for his customers -- the very jet with Riley, Billy, and Palmer on it. It is then up to Riley to hack into the jet's software and save herself and all on board.
40	19	"Benjamin Franklin + Grey Duffle"	Sharat Raju	Story by : Andrew Klein; Teleplay by : Andrew Karlsruher	April 6, 2018	MAC219	6.68
Dawn, a.k.a. Dixie, the con artist whom the team met in New Orleans, visits Jack, claiming that a CIA agent's death was not an accident. She also reveals that someone within the CIA codenamed Echo is making fake passports for people. Jack and Dawn visit one passport recipient while Mac and Bozer visit another. Both are forced into a shootout, but capture the suspects. They discover money hidden in the walls, which is actually counterfeit. Matty visits an old friend, CIA Deputy Director Julian Halsey, to identify Echo. The team tracks clues to Lima, Peru. After some trouble with local authorities, they locate the facility making the fake cash and capture someone trying to clear everything out. At Matty's request, they use the suspect's phone to see who tipped him off and a burner phone on Julian's desk rings. He takes Matty captive in his car, which she crashes, allowing the team to find her alive and arrest Julian. As Matty recovers, the team realizes that they are missing money: a million one-dollar bills that the counterfeiters had not yet turned into hundreds. Dawn leaves the money on the porch of a children's home where she once lived.
41	20	"Skyscraper – Power"	Peter Weller	Brian Durkin & Joshua Brown	April 13, 2018	MAC220	6.38
The Phoenix Foundation learns that a former Navy SEAL who has organized a criminal empire has targeted billionaire Ralph Jericho (Raphael Sbarge). The chase first leads the team to South Korea, but they are too late to catch the criminals leaving on a jet. Mac and Jack have to hijack a private plane owned by an elderly man named Saul (Ed Asner) to tail the other jet, which takes them to Beijing. Riley and Bozer soon also arrive to help. An outgunned Mac and Jack enter a skyscraper where Jericho owns an entire floor and rescue Jericho's young son from the thugs. Then, they must thwart what they suspect is a robbery. But when they find Jericho's safe untouched, they learn that the criminals' plans are more sinister.
42	21	"Wind + Water"	Mark Manos	Lee David Zlotoff	April 20, 2018	MAC221	6.27
MacGyver, Jack, Riley, and Bozer are in Puerto Rico helping Carlos (Diogo Morgado), Mac's old friend from basic training, rebuild his family's hurricane-damaged home. As they prepare to leave, the team gets wind of a group planning to steal $2 million in relief aid from the bank Carlos manages. They arrive at the bank too late, as Carlos and several others have already been taken hostage by the armed robbers. Mac and the team want to help, but there's a problem: Matty needs them on a plane to Los Angeles to deal with an urgent terrorist matter. Matty buys them some time by having a plane pick up the team in Puerto Rico. Mac intentionally gets himself taken hostage at the bank so he can deal with the matter from the inside.
43	22	"UFO + Area 51"	Ericson Core	Story by : Marqui Jackson; Teleplay by : Lindsey Allen & Nancy Kiu	April 27, 2018	MAC222	6.26
Mac and Riley go to a government research facility in Nevada and meet up with Dr. Isaac Herman (Arye Gross), who is studying a mysterious metallic sphere that landed in the desert. As an armed group, led by Porter (Michael Bisping), heads for the facility, Mac discovers that the sphere was a test to determine if a nuclear bomb could be delivered into the U.S. undetected. When the thugs arrive, Herman is shot and wounded. Mac and Riley manage to escape with Herman and decide the closest facility that will have armed protection and medical staff is Area 51. But, when they arrive, they find only two soldiers manning the facility and have to devise other ways to hold off the attackers. Back at the Phoenix Foundation, Matty grills Jack about the break-in at her house. Later, Riley gives Mac a flash drive with information about his father, which she acquired in Nevada using the upgraded security clearance Matty obtained for them.
44	23	"MacGyver + MacGyver"	Stephen Herek	Craig O'Neill & David Slack	May 4, 2018	MAC223	6.10
Mac confronts Matty and quits, telling her he can't work for someone he doesn't trust. She tells him she does not have the authority to approve dismissals, only "Oversight" does. Mac then goes to see Oversight, who turns out to be his father, James. James wants to explain to Mac why he couldn't see him all these years, but first he needs Mac's help in disrupting his former partner's cartel in Mexico, which is trying to create a drug that turns humans into the ultimate soldiers. Jack joins them after he arrives trying to find Mac. Back in Los Angeles, Bozer learns that Leanna will be coming to work for the Phoenix Foundation. While James, Mac, and Jack manage to destroy a lab and get back home, James' old partner escapes and is in the wind. Mac makes his peace with Matty, but then tells his father he's quitting using the same line he gave Matty: "I can't work for someone I don't trust."

== Ratings ==
Viewership and ratings per episode of MacGyver (2016 TV series) season 2
No.	Title	Air date	Rating/share (18–49)	Viewers (millions)	DVR (18–49)	DVR viewers (millions)	Total (18–49)	Total viewers (millions)
1	"DIY or DIE"	September 29, 2017	0.8/4	6.69	0.4	1.56	1.2	8.26^{2}
2	"Muscle Car + Paper Clip"	October 6, 2017	0.8/4	6.38	—	—	—	—
3	"Roulette Wheel + Wire"	October 13, 2017	0.8/4	6.74	—	—	—	—
4	"X-Ray + Penny"	October 20, 2017	0.8/4	6.77	—	1.33	—	8.11^{2}
5	"Skull + Electromagnet"	October 27, 2017	0.9/4	6.45	—	—	—	—
6	"Jet Engine + Pickup Truck"	November 3, 2017	0.8/4	7.09	—	1.35	—	8.44^{2}
7	"Duck Tape + Jack"	November 10, 2017	0.9/4	7.27	—	1.40	—	8.67^{2}
8	"Packing Peanuts + Fire"	November 17, 2017	0.9/4	7.17	—	—	—	—
9	"CD-ROM + Hoagie Foil"	December 1, 2017	0.8/4	6.61	—	1.50	—	8.11^{2}
10	"War Room + Ship"	December 8, 2017	0.9/4	7.21	—	1.34	—	8.55^{2}
11	"Bullet + Pen"	December 15, 2017	0.8/4	6.87	—	—	—	—
12	"Mac + Jack"	January 5, 2018	0.9/4	7.83	—	1.34	—	9.18^{2}
13	"CO2 Sensor + Tree Branch"	January 12, 2018	1.0/4	8.14	—	1.41	—	9.55^{2}
14	"Mardi Gras Beads + Chair"	January 19, 2018	1.0/4	7.68	—	1.59	—	9.27^{2}
15	"Murdoc + Handcuffs"	February 2, 2018	0.9/4	7.27	—	1.53	—	8.79^{2}
16	"Hammock + Balcony"	March 2, 2018	0.8/4	6.93	—	1.56	—	8.48^{2}
17	"Bear Trap + Mob Boss"	March 9, 2018	0.9/4	6.61	—	—	—	—
18	"Riley + Airplane"	March 30, 2018	0.8/4	6.43	—	—	—	—
19	"Benjamin Franklin + Grey Duffle"	April 6, 2018	0.8/4	6.68	—	1.74	—	8.42
20	"Skyscraper – Power"	April 13, 2018	0.8/4	6.38	—	1.70	—	8.08
21	"Wind + Water"	April 20, 2018	0.8/4	6.27	—	—	—	—
22	"UFO + Area 51"	April 27, 2018	0.7/3	6.26	—	1.30	—	7.56^{2}
23	"MacGyver + MacGyver"	May 4, 2018	0.6/3	6.10	—	1.63	—	7.73

^2 Live +7 ratings were not available, so Live +3 ratings have been used instead.
