= List of MacGyver (2016 TV series) episodes =

MacGyver is an American action-adventure television series developed by Peter M. Lenkov and starring Lucas Till as the title character. It is a reboot of the ABC series of the same name created by Lee David Zlotoff, which aired from 1985 to 1992. The series premiered on September 23, 2016, on CBS.

In May 2020, CBS renewed the series for a fifth season, which premiered on December 4, 2020. During the course of the series, 94 episodes of MacGyver aired over five seasons, concluding on April 30, 2021.

== Series overview ==
Season	Episodes	Originally released	
Season	Episodes	First released	Last released
1	21	September 23, 2016	April 14, 2017
2	23	September 29, 2017	May 4, 2018
3	22	September 28, 2018	May 10, 2019
4	13	February 7, 2020	May 8, 2020
5	15	December 4, 2020	April 30, 2021

== Episodes ==
=== Season 1 (2016–17) ===
In Season 1, all episodes, with the exception of the pilot, are named after a tool on MacGyver's Swiss Army Knife.

No. overall	No. in season	Title	Directed by	Written by	Original release date	Prod. code	U.S. viewers (millions)
1	1	"The Rising"	James Wan	Story by : Peter M. Lenkov & Paul Downs Colaizzo; Teleplay by : Peter M. Lenkov	September 23, 2016	MAC101	10.90
2	2	"Metal Saw"	Jerry Levine	Craig O'Neill	September 30, 2016	MAC102	9.07
3	3	"Awl"	Matt Earl Beesley	David Slack	October 7, 2016	MAC103	8.09
4	4	"Wire Cutter"	Joe Dante	John Turman	October 14, 2016	MAC104	7.44
5	5	"Toothpick"	Bobby Roth	Nancy Kiu	October 21, 2016	MAC105	7.95
6	6	"Wrench"	Alec Smight	Brian Durkin	October 28, 2016	MAC106	7.27
7	7	"Can Opener"	Omar Madha	Sean Hennen	November 4, 2016	MAC107	7.59
8	8	"Corkscrew"	Janice Cooke	Lindsey Allen	November 11, 2016	MAC108	7.65
9	9	"Chisel"	Brad Tanenbaum	Bret VandenBos & Brandon Willer	November 18, 2016	MAC109	8.12
10	10	"Pliers"	Lee Rose	Brian Durkin	December 9, 2016	MAC110	7.42
11	11	"Scissors"	Stephen Herek	Lindsay Allen and Nancy Kiu	December 16, 2016	MAC111	7.67
12	12	"Screwdriver"	Craig Siebels	Story by : Peter M. Lenkov; Teleplay by : Craig O'Neill and David Slack	January 6, 2017	MAC112	8.42
13	13	"Large Blade"	Sylvain White	Andrew Karlsruher	January 13, 2017	MAC113	7.64
14	14	"Fish Scaler"	Eagle Egilsson	Story by : John Turman; Teleplay by : Craig O'Neill and David Slack	February 3, 2017	MAC114	7.43
15	15	"Magnifying Glass"	Stephen Herek	Brian Durkin	February 10, 2017	MAC115	8.02
16	16	"Hook"	Tawnia McKiernan	Nancy Kiu	February 17, 2017	MAC116	7.24
17	17	"Ruler"	Antonio Negret	Andrew Karlsruher	February 24, 2017	MAC117	6.93
18	18	"Flashlight"	Jonathan Brown	Lindsay Allen	March 10, 2017	MAC118	7.73
19	19	"Compass"	Christine Moore	Lee David Zlotoff	March 31, 2017	MAC119	6.56
20	20	"Hole Puncher"	Elizabeth Allen Rosenbaum	Craig O'Neill & David Slack	April 7, 2017	MAC120	6.62
21	21	"Cigar Cutter"	Stephen Herek	Story by : Craig O'Neill & David Slack; Teleplay by : Peter M. Lenkov	April 14, 2017	MAC121	6.57

=== Season 2 (2017–18) ===
In Season 2, all episodes, with the exception of the premiere, are two key parts of an invention that MacGyver creates in the episode.

No. overall	No. in season	Title	Directed by	Written by	Original release date	Prod. code	U.S. viewers (millions)
22	1	"DIY or DIE"	Stephen Herek	Peter M. Lenkov & Craig O'Neill & David Slack	September 29, 2017	MAC201	6.69
23	2	"Muscle Car + Paper Clip"	Ericson Core	Nancy Kiu	October 6, 2017	MAC203	6.38
24	3	"Roulette Wheel + Wire"	Duane Clark	Justin Lisson	October 13, 2017	MAC202	6.74
25	4	"X-Ray + Penny"	Bethany Rooney	Craig O'Neill & David Slack	October 20, 2017	MAC204	6.77
26	5	"Skull + Electromagnet"	Liz Allen Rosenbaum	Lindsey Allen	October 27, 2017	MAC205	6.45
27	6	"Jet Engine + Pickup Truck"	Stephen Herek	Andrew Karlsruher	November 3, 2017	MAC206	7.09
28	7	"Duct Tape + Jack"	Gabriel Beristain	Brian Durkin	November 10, 2017	MAC207	7.27
29	8	"Packing Peanuts + Fire"	Stacey K. Black	Lindsey Allen	November 17, 2017	MAC208	7.17
30	9	"CD-ROM + Hoagie Foil"	Bobby Roth	Marqui Jackson & Nancy Kiu	December 1, 2017	MAC209	6.61
31	10	"War Room + Ship"	Tawnia McKiernan	Brian Durkin & Andrew Karlsruher	December 8, 2017	MAC210	7.21
32	11	"Bullet + Pen"	Carlos Bernard	Marqui Jackson	December 15, 2017	MAC211	6.87
33	12	"Mac + Jack"	Ron Underwood	Story by : Peter M. Lenkov; Teleplay by : Craig O'Neill & David Slack	January 5, 2018	MAC212	7.83
34	13	"CO2 Sensor + Tree Branch"	Brad Turner	Story by : Timothy J. Lea; Teleplay by : Adam Beechen	January 12, 2018	MAC213	8.14
35	14	"Mardi Gras Beads + Chair"	Mike Martinez	Story by : Brian Durkin; Teleplay by : Marqui Jackson & Andrew Karlsruher	January 19, 2018	MAC214	7.68
36	15	"Murdoc + Handcuffs"	Stephen Herek	Marqui Jackson	February 2, 2018	MAC215	7.27
37	16	"Hammock + Balcony"	Eagle Egilsson	Justin Lisson	March 2, 2018	MAC216	6.93
38	17	"Bear Trap + Mob Boss"	Steven A. Adelson	Nancy Kiu	March 9, 2018	MAC217	6.61
39	18	"Riley + Airplane"	Antonio Negret	Lindsey Allen	March 30, 2018	MAC218	6.43
40	19	"Benjamin Franklin + Grey Duffle"	Sharat Raju	Story by : Andrew Klein; Teleplay by : Andrew Karlsruher	April 6, 2018	MAC219	6.68
41	20	"Skyscraper – Power"	Peter Weller	Brian Durkin & Joshua Brown	April 13, 2018	MAC220	6.38
42	21	"Wind + Water"	Mark Manos	Lee David Zlotoff	April 20, 2018	MAC221	6.27
43	22	"UFO + Area 51"	Ericson Core	Story by : Marqui Jackson; Teleplay by : Lindsey Allen & Nancy Kiu	April 27, 2018	MAC222	6.26
44	23	"MacGyver + MacGyver"	Stephen Herek	Craig O'Neill & David Slack	May 4, 2018	MAC223	6.10

=== Season 3 (2018–19) ===
In Season 3, all episodes, with the exception of the premiere, are three key people/items/events that MacGyver and his friends find or experience in the episode.

No. overall	No. in season	Title	Directed by	Written by	Original release date	Prod. code	U.S. viewers (millions)
45	1	"Improvise"	Stephen Herek	Peter M. Lenkov & Craig O'Neill	September 28, 2018	MAC301	5.77
46	2	"Bravo Lead + Loyalty + Friendship"	Duane Clark	Brian Durkin	October 5, 2018	MAC302	5.73
47	3	"Bozer + Booze + Back to School"	Tessa Blake	Nancy Kiu	October 12, 2018	MAC303	6.16
48	4	"Guts + Fuel + Hope"	Peter Weller	Rob Pearlstein	October 19, 2018	MAC304	6.01
49	5	"Dia de Muertos + Sicarios + Family"	Eagle Egilsson	Jim Adler & Andrew Karlsruher	October 26, 2018	MAC305	5.90
50	6	"Murdoc + MacGyver + Murdoc"	Stephen Herek	Craig O'Neill	November 2, 2018	MAC306	6.06
51	7	"Scavengers + Hard Drive + Dragonfly"	Gabriel Beristain	Andrew Karlsruher	November 9, 2018	MAC307	6.43
52	8	"Revenge + Catacombs + Le Fantome"	Lily Mariye	Brian Durkin	November 16, 2018	MAC308	6.20
53	9	"Specimen 234 + PAPR + Outbreak"	Mike Martinez	Lindsey Allen	November 30, 2018	MAC309	6.28
54	10	"Matty + Ethan + Fidelity"	David Straiton	Andrew Karlsruher	December 7, 2018	MAC310	6.36
55	11	"Mac + Fallout + Jack"	Carlos Bernard	Jim Adler	January 4, 2019	MAC311	6.42
56	12	"Fence + Suitcase + Americium-241"	Ron Underwood	Brian Durkin	January 11, 2019	MAC312	6.58
57	13	"Wilderness + Training + Survival"	Brad Turner	Joshua Brown & Andrew Klein	January 18, 2019	MAC313	6.90
58	14	"Father + Bride + Betrayal"	Avi Youabian	Story by : Sophia Lopez; Teleplay by : Lindsey Allen & Nancy Kiu	February 1, 2019	MAC314	6.96
59	15	"K9 + Smugglers + New Recruit"	Gabriel Beristain	Rob Pearlstein	February 15, 2019	MAC315	6.38
60	16	"Lidar + Rogues + Duty"	Stephen Herek	Don Perez	February 22, 2019	MAC316	6.57
61	17	"Seeds + Permafrost + Feather"	Alexandra La Roche	Nancy Kiu and Lindsey Allen	March 15, 2019	MAC317	5.62
62	18	"Murdoc + Helman + Hit"	Roderick Davis	Lee David Zlotoff	April 5, 2019	MAC318	5.57
63	19	"Friends + Enemies + Border"	Andi Armaganian	Justin Lisson	April 12, 2019	MAC319	6.08
64	20	"No-Go + High-Voltage + Rescue"	Eagle Egillson	Rob Pearlstein & Andrew Karlsruher	April 26, 2019	MAC320	5.54
65	21	"Treason + Heartbreak + Gum"	Stephen Herek	Nancy Kiu & Lindsey Allen	May 3, 2019	MAC322	5.33
66	22	"Mason + Cable + Choices"	Maja Vrvilo	Jim Adler	May 10, 2019	MAC321	5.47

=== Season 4 (2020) ===
No. overall	No. in season	Title	Directed by	Written by	Original release date	Prod. code	U.S. viewers (millions)
67	1	"Fire + Ashes + Legacy = Phoenix"	David Straiton	Terry Matalas	February 7, 2020	MAC402	5.94
68	2	"Red Cell + Quantum + Cold + Committed"	David Straiton	Terry Matalas	February 14, 2020	MAC401	5.77
69	3	"Kid + Plane + Cable + Truck"	Lily Mariye	Rob Pearlstein	February 21, 2020	MAC403	5.83
70	4	"Windmill + Acetone + Celluloid + Firing Pin"	Eagle Egilsson	Andrew Karlsruher	February 28, 2020	MAC404	5.57
71	5	"Soccer + Desi + Merchant + Titan"	Duane Clark	Cindy Appel	March 6, 2020	MAC405	5.65
72	6	"Right + Wrong + Both + Neither"	Roderick Davis	Andrew Klein	March 13, 2020	MAC406	5.84
73	7	"Mac + Desi + Riley + Aubrey"	Brad Turner	Stephanie Hicks	March 27, 2020	MAC407	6.72
74	8	"Father + Son + Father + Matriarch"	David Straiton	Travis Fickett	April 3, 2020	MAC408	7.07
75	9	"Code + Artemis + Nuclear + N3mesis"	Michael Martinez	Brandon Botta & Casey Tollett Botta	April 10, 2020	MAC409	6.38
76	10	"Tesla + Bell + Edison + Mac"	Yangzon Brauen	Rob Pearlstein	April 17, 2020	MAC410	6.44
77	11	"Psy-Op + Cell + Merchant + Birds"	Ericson Core	Story by : Stephanie Hicks & Andrew Klein; Teleplay by : Cindy Appel & Andrew Karlsruher	April 24, 2020	MAC411	6.19
78	12	"Loyalty + Family + Rogue + Hellfire"	Geoff Shotz	Jim Adler	May 1, 2020	MAC412	5.89
79	13	"Save + The + Dam + World"	Carlos Bernard	Story by : Terry Matalas; Teleplay by : Cindy Appel	May 8, 2020	MAC413	5.77

=== Season 5 (2020–21) ===
No. overall	No. in season	Title	Directed by	Written by	Original release date	Prod. code	U.S. viewers (millions)
80	1	"Resort + Desi + Riley + Window Cleaner + Witness"	Avi Youabian	Stephanie Hicks	December 4, 2020	MAC511; MAC415 (Note: These episodes were originally written as part of the fourth season and initially received season four production codes. After filming of the fourth season was cut short due to the COVID-19 pandemic in the United States, the episodes were then completed as part of the fifth season and also received season five production codes. The first code indicates the production code of the fifth season, while the second code is the initial fourth season production code.)	4.90
81	2	"Thief + Painting + Auction + Viro-486 + Justice"	Duane Clark	Peter M. Lenkov & Andrew Klein	December 11, 2020	MAC510; MAC414	4.79
82	3	"Eclipse + USMC-1856707 + Step Potential + Chain Lock + Ma"	David Straiton	Jim Adler & Stephanie Hicks	December 18, 2020	MAC501	4.72
83	4	"Banh Bao + Sterno + Drill + Burner + Mason"	Peter Weller	Justin Lisson & Sophia Lopez	January 8, 2021	MAC515; MAC419	5.17
84	5	"Jack + Kinematics + Safe Cracker + MgKNO3 + GTO"	Ericson Core	Jim Adler	January 15, 2021	MAC512; MAC416	4.99
85	6	"Quarantine + N95 + Landline + Telescope + Social Distance"	Andrew Ahn	Stephanie Hicks & Andrew Karlsruher	January 22, 2021	MAC502	4.99
86	7	"Golden Lancehead + Venom + Pole Vault + Blood + Baggage"	David Straiton	Joshua Brown & Andrew Karlsruher	February 5, 2021	MAC513; MAC417	5.16
87	8	"SOS + Hazmat + Ultrasound + Frequency + Malihini"	Yangzom Brauen	Cindy Appel	February 12, 2021	MAC514; MAC418	4.73
88	9	"Rails + Pitons + Pulley + Pipe + Salt"	Christine Moore	Rob Pearlstein	February 19, 2021	MAC504; MAC420	4.96
89	10	"Diamond + Quake + Carbon + Comms + Tower"	Michael Martinez	Andrew Karlsruher & Andrew Klein	March 5, 2021	MAC503	4.50
90	11	"C8H7ClO + Nano-Trackers + Resistance + Maldives + Mind Games"	David Straiton	Joshua Brown & Teresa Huang	March 26, 2021	MAC505	4.31
91	12	"Royalty + Marriage + Vivaah Sanskar + Zinc + Henna"	Anne Renton	Monica Macer & Andrew Klein	April 2, 2021	MAC506	4.34
92	13	"Barn Find + Engine Oil + La Punzonatura + Lab Rats + Tachometer"	Katie Eastridge	Alessia Costantini & Andrew Karlsruher	April 9, 2021	MAC507	4.73
93	14	"H2O + Orthophosphates + Mission City + Corrosion + Origins"	Christine Swanson	Teresa Huang & Joshua Brown	April 16, 2021	MAC508	4.33
94	15	"Abduction + Memory + Time + Fireworks + Dispersal"	David Straiton	Monica Macer & Alessia Costantini & Andrew Klein & Stephanie Hicks	April 30, 2021	MAC509	4.48

== Ratings ==
=== Overview ===
MacGyver : U.S. viewers per episode (millions)

Season	Episode number																						
Season	1	2	3	4	5	6	7	8	9	10	11	12	13	14	15	16	17	18	19	20	21	22	23
1	10.90	9.07	8.09	7.44	7.95	7.27	7.59	7.65	8.12	7.42	7.67	8.42	7.64	7.43	8.02	7.24	6.93	7.73	6.56	6.62	6.57	–	
2	6.69	6.38	6.74	6.77	6.45	7.09	7.27	7.17	6.61	7.21	6.87	7.83	8.14	7.68	7.27	6.93	6.61	6.43	6.68	6.38	6.27	6.26	6.10
3	5.77	5.73	6.16	6.01	5.90	6.06	6.43	6.20	6.28	6.36	6.42	6.58	6.90	6.96	6.38	6.57	5.62	5.57	6.08	5.54	5.33	5.47	–
4	5.94	5.77	5.83	5.57	5.65	5.84	6.72	7.07	6.38	6.44	6.20	5.89	5.77	–									
5	4.90	4.79	4.72	5.17	4.99	4.99	5.16	4.73	4.96	4.50	4.31	4.34	4.73	4.33	4.48	–							

Audience measurement performed by Nielsen Media Research
