= MacGyver (2016 TV series) season 5 =

MacGyver
- Season 5
- Showrunner: Monica Macer
- Starring: Lucas Till; Tristin Mays; Justin Hires; Meredith Eaton; Levy Tran; Henry Ian Cusick
- No. of episodes: 15

Release
- Original network: CBS
- Original release: December 4, 2020 – April 30, 2021

Season chronology
- ← Previous; Season 4

The fifth and final season of the CBS action-adventure series MacGyver premiered on December 4, 2020 for the 2020–21 television season. CBS renewed the series for a fifth season in May 2020 and announced it would be the final season in April 2021. The season contained fifteen episodes and concluded on April 30, 2021. MacGyver, a remake of the 1985 series of the same name, centers on the fictional Phoenix Foundation which is a covert organization masquerading as a think tank. The series stars Lucas Till, Tristin Mays, Justin Hires, Meredith Eaton, Levy Tran and Henry Ian Cusick. Jorge Garcia appeared in the eighth episode of the season as his Hawaii Five-0 character.

The season was also the only season not to have Peter M. Lenkov serving as a showrunner after he was fired prior to the season over allegations of creating a toxic work environment. Monica Macer, who joined the series as an executive producer a month before Lenkov was fired, served as the showrunner for the season. The season premiere, "Resort + Desi + Riley + Window Cleaner + Witness", was watched by 4.90 million viewers, while the season finale, "Abduction + Memory + Time + Fireworks + Dispersal", was watched by 4.48 million viewers. The most watched episode of the season was the fourth episode, "Banh Bao + Sterno + Drill + Burner + Mason", with 5.17 million viewers.

== Cast and characters ==
=== Main ===
- Lucas Till as Angus "Mac" MacGyver
- Tristin Mays as Riley Davis
- Justin Hires as Wilt Bozer
- Meredith Eaton as Matilda "Matty" Webber
- Levy Tran as Desiree "Desi" Nguyen
- Henry Ian Cusick as Russell "Russ/Rusty" Taylor

=== Recurring ===
- Alexandra Grey as Parker

=== Guest stars ===
- Anabelle Acosta as Paula
- Camilla Arfwedson as Sofia Walker
- Tobin Bell as Leland
- David Dastmalchian as Murdoc
- Ernie Hudson as Milton Bozer
- Dan Lauria as Lenny Krengel
- Zach McGowan as Roman
- Aly Michalka as Franklin "Frankie" Mallory
- Aimee Mullins as Jess Miller
- Bojana Novakovic as Anya Vitez
- Joe Pantoliano as Eric "General Ma" Andrews
- Wendy Raquel Robinson as Lauretta Bozer
- Peter Weller as Elliot Mason

=== Crossover ===
- Jorge Garcia as Jerry Ortega

== Episodes ==
The number in the "No. overall" column refers to the episode's number within the overall series, whereas the number in the "No. in season" column refers to the episode's number within this particular season. "U.S. viewers (millions)" refers to the number of viewers in the U.S. in millions who watched the episode as it was aired.

No. overall	No. in season	Title	Directed by	Written by	Original release date	Prod. code	U.S. viewers (millions)
80	1	"Resort + Desi + Riley + Window Cleaner + Witness"	Avi Youabian	Stephanie Hicks	December 4, 2020	MAC511; MAC415 (Note: These episodes were originally written as part of the fourth season and initially received season four production codes. After filming of the fourth season was cut short due to the COVID-19 pandemic in the United States, the episodes were then completed as part of the fifth season and also received season five production codes. The first code indicates the production code of the fifth season, while the second code is the initial fourth season production code.)	4.90
The Phoenix team tries to locate Paula Matos, who worked the legitimate businesses for international arms dealer Gustavo Salazar before he forced her to the criminal side. They learn she is likely being held in the Zurich Grand Hotel, which is really a front international criminals use to hide out. After Mac and Russ convince Vincent Broulee, the son of the hotel's owner, to get them access, Matty sends Desi and Riley to check in under the guise of being cyber criminals. Mac and Russ eventually follow, but Vincent double-crosses them, putting the entire team in danger.
81	2	"Thief + Painting + Auction + Viro-486 + Justice"	Duane Clark	Peter M. Lenkov & Andrew Klein	December 11, 2020	MAC510; MAC414	4.79
After an MI6 agent Russ mentored is killed when she tries to keep a deadly bioweapon from falling into the hands of terrorists, the entire Phoenix team works on a retrieval plan with one addition: notorious cat burglar Jess Miller. Unable to pull off the heist herself due to having a prosthetic leg from a past injury, Miller is asked to train Desi. Despite the timeline being moved up, cutting her training short, Desi performs flawlessly, but the vial containing the virus has been moved. This forces the team to use one of Miller's other skills while Mac improvises.
82	3	"Eclipse + USMC-1856707 + Step Potential + Chain Lock + Ma"	David Straiton	Jim Adler & Stephanie Hicks	December 18, 2020	MAC501	4.72
After Mac and Riley successfully retrieve the plans for a suitcase nuke thought to be ordered by CODEX leader Leland, Russ is tailed on his drive home and abducted. Russ is forced to make a video and Riley catches a glimpse of CODEX soldier Roman, thought to be dead. Russ says CODEX wants a mercenary named Eric Andrews in exchange for Russ' freedom while, off-camera, Leland gets Russ to reveal the location of a scepter that Mac's Aunt Gwen had before she perished. With the FBI refusing to help, Mac and Desi break Andrews, known in Southeast Asia as "General Ma" (demon), out of the prison where he's been since 1985. With Andrews becoming an ally, Mac and Desi rescue Russ. Back home, Russ reveals he told a half-truth about the scepter's location, then reveals it to the team and shows that it contains electronic files of all CODEX's plans.
83	4	"Banh Bao + Sterno + Drill + Burner + Mason"	Peter Weller	Justin Lisson & Sophia Lopez	January 8, 2021	MAC515; MAC419	5.17
After Mac and Desi visit Desi's parents, they discover that Desi's brother, a medical examiner, is being forced to list a murder victim's death as a suicide. The people making the request have threatened to kill his parents if he doesn't cooperate. Although Desi's true profession remains a mystery to her family, she assures her brother that she and Mac can help. Elsewhere, Russ and Matty attend an awards ceremony where they try to recruit a teenage genius. Shortly after, they notice the teen being followed by what the team is later able to identify as FBI agents. To find out what agent may have gone rogue, they reluctantly consult Elliot Mason, who turns out to have a connection to the teen.
84	5	"Jack + Kinematics + Safe Cracker + MgKNO3 + GTO"	Ericson Core	Jim Adler	January 15, 2021	MAC512; MAC416	4.99
Jack Dalton's body is returned to the US after he is killed in pursuit of international terrorist Tiberius Kovac in Zagreb, Croatia. Kovac is said to have blown up himself and Jack rather than be captured. The team has little time to mourn, as Mac receives a coded postcard that Jack ordered to be sent upon his death. The card is from Jack's alias "Ozzy Ulrich" and references the "wilderness of mirrors," which Russ recognizes as code for deception. The team heads to Zagreb, where they are double-crossed by local contact Anya Vitez (Bojana Novakovic), whom Russ knows from the British Consulate in Croatia. They soon learn that Tiberius Kovac never existed and was instead created by Anya to cover her criminal enterprises.
85	6	"Quarantine + N95 + Landline + Telescope + Social Distance"	Andrew Ahn	Stephanie Hicks & Andrew Karlsruher	January 22, 2021	MAC502	4.99
As Mac, Bozer, and Riley are quarantined at Mac's house, they come across shady business at a neighbor's house. Mac is overtaken by a thug and learns from the neighbors that their son, who runs a cleaning business currently disinfecting a closed shopping mall, has been threatened by the thug's crew. Mac deduces the criminals' plan to impersonate the cleaning crew and rob a jewelry store in the mall. After getting free, he calls in Desi to assist Bozer, Riley, and himself in thwarting the robbery and ending the threat. Meanwhile, a casual fling between Russ and his former colleague Sofia turns into a 28-day quarantine. Sofia discovers research Russ is doing on an old treasure and he later learns that Sofia took photos of the research and fled.
86	7	"Golden Lancehead + Venom + Pole Vault + Blood + Baggage"	David Straiton	Joshua Brown & Andrew Karlsruher	February 5, 2021	MAC513; MAC417	5.16
Mac has been secretly working with his college friend Frankie alongside two other colleagues to develop a cure for cancer using a rare snake venom. Mac gets a call from Desi, who is still having trust issues following the CODEX mission and tailed him, and he goes outside to explain to her. When the two return to the lab, they find it ransacked with the two lab assistants dead and Frankie missing, and soon learn that the snake venom could be used as a bio-weapon. What ensues is a race to beat the clock involving Phoenix, the Department of Defense, and a middleman who betrayed his country to take a higher payment from a criminal element. The rogue agent is later revealed by Matty to have been paid by CODEX.
87	8	"SOS + Hazmat + Ultrasound + Frequency + Malihini"	Yangzom Brauen	Cindy Appel	February 12, 2021	MAC514; MAC418	4.73
Phoenix is visited by former Hawaii Five-0 member Jerry Ortega, who once helped Mac and is known for his conspiracy theories. Ortega has discovered some recruitment efforts by CODEX that he thinks may be valuable. However, Mac and Desi are pulled away by Matty for a case of a personal nature. Her friend and former mentor, a cold war hero, has reached out about strange illnesses among his staff. Back home, Ortega learns of a bomb request from CODEX and Russ realizes Jerry is the best person to impersonate a bomb maker. During the meet, Russ and Bozer are able capture four CODEX members, while Ortega grabs a flash drive off one member. Russ learns from the flash drive that the CODEX recruiting efforts are more widespread than anyone thought. Note : This episode is a crossover with Hawaii Five-0.
88	9	"Rails + Pitons + Pulley + Pipe + Salt"	Christine Moore	Rob Pearlstein	February 19, 2021	MAC504; MAC420	4.96
The Phoenix team learns that two U.S. soldiers transporting a hard drive containing DOD intel through Uzbekistan are in danger. When Mac, Riley, and Desi arrive, they are surprised to see an American leading the group trying to steal the hard drive. Mac makes a highly risky move to keep the intel from being communicated, leading Desi and others to feel like he is trying to prevent any more friends from getting hurt after the tragedies with Jimmy, Gwen, and Jack. Russ and Bozer receive information that CODEX leader Leland may be behind the hard drive theft but, after figuring out where he is, they find his dead, burned body. Russ deduces that the reason they are seeing so many random acts from CODEX recently is because the many members and factions are fighting to fill the leadership void.
89	10	"Diamond + Quake + Carbon + Comms + Tower"	Michael Martinez	Andrew Karlsruher & Andrew Klein	March 5, 2021	MAC503	4.50
Mac's plans to propose to Desi are interrupted when Matty and Russ learn a CODEX-wide communication has originated from Mexico City. When Mac, Desi, and Riley arrive, Mac finds that Murdoc is calling the shots, later discovering that Eric "General Ma" Andrews (Ep. 5.3) broke Murdoc out of their dark site. When Desi and Riley are detained and Mac is cornered, the group learns the ultimate plan when a web meeting with all the CODEX cell leaders begins: Andrews plans to assassinate Mac on camera as a means of ensuring his election to replace Leland as CODEX leader. During the caper, Murdoc reveals some big secrets within Phoenix that he learned, such as Riley's feelings for Mac and some tragic news about Leanna that Russ has kept from Bozer.
90	11	"C8H7ClO + Nano-Trackers + Resistance + Maldives + Mind Games"	David Straiton	Joshua Brown & Teresa Huang	March 26, 2021	MAC505	4.31
When the leader of a freedom fighter group in the Republic of Srpska goes missing, Mac and Riley head there to find him, only to learn of a large underground syndicate that uses nanotech to track the protestors. They fight to save the protestors, while Russ works to disable the tracking software that was developed by a former MI6 professor he knows from his past. Working with his new assistant, Parker, and "acting director" Bozer (so titled because Matty is busy in D.C.), Russ juggles assisting Mac and Riley while Desi is on a separate mission in the Andes. All of this happens under the watch of the Minister of Defense from the UK, who is here because of an agreement of collaboration between the American DOD and British Ministry. Originally, she declines to work with the Phoenix because she always gets left out by Russ. She changes her mind after witnessing the performance of the whole Phoenix team. Although he and Riley are successful, Mac later finds Chinese serial numbers in the nano tracking devices.
91	12	"Royalty + Marriage + Vivaah Sanskar + Zinc + Henna"	Anne Renton	Monica Macer & Andrew Klein	April 2, 2021	MAC506	4.34
Mac, Desi, and Russ go undercover at a royal Indian wedding to protect a princess whose causes are opposed by multiple groups. However, the real threat appears to be someone much closer. While there, Russ runs into Sofia and presses her about why she left suddenly when they were quarantined. Sofia ultimately admits to having interest in pursuing the Incan treasure that Russ has been researching for decades. Back home, Matty and Parker work to uncover the source of the nano trackers that are still inside Mac and Riley. Also, Bozer becomes suspicious of Riley when he sees evidence that she has reconnected with her old hacking network.
92	13	"Barn Find + Engine Oil + La Punzonatura + Lab Rats + Tachometer"	Katie Eastridge	Alessia Costantini & Andrew Karlsruher	April 9, 2021	MAC507	4.73
When an antique car connected to a former head of the Mafia is found in a barn, Mac & Desi go to Italy to find the car to prove that the head of the Mafia is not dead, but their mission goes sideways when they get accused of murder by the local police and their captain, who has a history with the Mafia. Things get worse when soon they discover that both of Mac's hands are paralyzed from the side effects of the nano tracker inside him and Riley. Mac and Desi meet with Russ and Riley at San Marzano and, with the help of the local mechanic group, hold a car show in the city to flush out the head of the Mafia. At the end of the episode, while Matty is busy looking at the dealer of the nano tracker thanks to Riley hacking the dealer's webcam, she sees the dealer get shot and murdered right before the murderer cuts the transmission directly.
93	14	"H2O + Orthophosphates + Mission City + Corrosion + Origins"	Christine Swanson	Teresa Huang & Joshua Brown	April 16, 2021	MAC508	4.33
Mac, Desi, and Bozer visit the home of Bozer's parents after learning that Bozer's Aunt Pamela passed away when her vehicle ran off the road into a river. Mac discovers that Pamela had ingested an unusual amount of chlorine, indicating she was drowned somewhere else first. Mac and Desi follow up on the possibility that Pamela was about to expose a cover-up involving the municipal water supply. Meanwhile, Bozer tries to protect his mother, Lauretta, after a chase convinces him that she is the next target. Lauretta soon learns that Pamela secretly sent her damning evidence on the culprits. Elsewhere, Riley investigates the company that manufactured the nano trackers, visiting the founder, Dr. Basco Fox, under the guise of looking for employment. She later uses her hacking group to remove evidence from the building, without permission from Matty or Russ. Security footage retrieved shows a dismissed employee stealing materials on his way out.
94	15	"Abduction + Memory + Time + Fireworks + Dispersal"	David Straiton	Monica Macer & Alessia Costantini & Andrew Klein & Stephanie Hicks	April 30, 2021	MAC509	4.48
The team learns that Orson Marcato is behind the theft of the nano trackers that are inside Mac and Riley. After disappearing for a day during a preliminary fact-finding excursion, Mac and Riley turn up in a cornfield with no recollection of where they were. Memory exercises (and later video evidence) lead them to realize they were the subjects of experiments to see if the nano trackers could be manipulated to control their physical actions. By questioning Marcato's assistant, they learn that the U.S. government is behind the experiments. Matty confirms this during a meeting in D.C., as the team rushes to prevent nano trackers from being pushed into hundreds of U.S. soldiers and their families at a D.C. rally. After successfully thwarting this threat, Bozer proposes a way to remove the trackers in a hyperbaric chamber, which proves successful. However, Mac announces his resignation, not wanting to work for a government that can conduct experiments without permission. His colleagues follow suit until Russ and Matty announce their plans to make Phoenix a fully private entity, which will refuse any government contracts and only work on cases of their own choosing. This brings everyone back into the fold.

== Production ==
=== Development ===
The season was ordered on May 6, 2020. Prior to the season, Teresa Huang was hired as the story editor for the series. On June 12, 2020, the series' writers announced that they had started working on writing for the season.

This was also the first and only season without Peter M. Lenkov as showrunner, after he was fired from both MacGyver and Magnum P.I. on July 7, 2020 by CBS, following allegations that he created a toxic work environment. Lenkov had also been the showrunner for Hawaii Five-0, which had already concluded its ten season run prior to his firing. Also, as a result of his firing, he also lost the final year on his overall deal with CBS Television Studios. In response to his firing, Lenkov said, "I accept responsibility for what I am hearing, and am committed to doing the work that is required to do better and be better." Monica Macer, who was hired as an executive producer on the series in June 2020, replaced Lenkov as the showrunner. Series star Lucas Till said that Lenkov's actions, particularly during the first season, caused him to feel suicidal, and drove him to his breaking point. Till also said that Lenkov bullied, verbally abused, and body-shamed him. A spokesperson for Lenkov stated that Till's accusations were not true, and that Lenkov had always supported Till.

On August 12, 2020, it was announced that CBS Television Studios had signed a deal with the law enforcement advisory group 21CP Solutions, to consult on its crime and legal dramas, which includes MacGyver. 21CP Solutions will help the series' to more accurately portray law enforcement. This comes after the George Floyd protests, which caused the television industry to rethink their portrayal of law enforcement.

=== Filming ===
On November 11, 2020, Justin Hires announced that filming had started on the season. There were nine remaining episodes written for the fourth season that were then completed and aired as part of the fifth season. Filming on the season had been completed prior to the series' cancellation.

=== Casting ===
One of the remaining episodes from the fourth season included a crossover appearance from Jorge Garcia as Jerry Ortega, his character from Hawaii Five-0.

On February 18, 2021, it was announced that Alexandra Grey had been cast in a recurring role as Parker, a transgender female Phoenix engineer who assists the team. The following day, Ernie Hudson and Wendy Raquel Robinson were revealed to have been cast as Milton and Lauretta Bozer, the parents of Hires' character, Wilt. Multiple actors reprised their roles from previous seasons, including Aly Michalka and David Dastmalchian.

=== Cancellation and future ===
On April 7, 2021, it was announced that MacGyver would end after five seasons with the series finale being set for April 30, 2021. The series was averaging 5.85 million viewers an episode when the decision was made. Kelly Kahl, CBS' Entertainment President, stated about the decision "All of us at CBS are extremely grateful for the incredible work and dedication from Lucas and the rest of the cast, as well as Monica, the writers and the entire crew, the MacGyver team traveled far and wide to repeatedly save the world with little more than bubble gum and a paper clip and made this show distinctly their own. We're gratified we get to give this dedicated and loyal fan base the opportunity to say goodbye to their favorite characters in the thoughtful manner this series deserves." Macer said the news came as a shock to her and that the network informed her of the cancellation first and allowed her time to tell the cast and crew prior to making the news public. Because filming on the season was finished, Macer also had to turn what she planned on being a season finale, into a series finale using the already completed footage. Once the news became public, fans of the series organized a loose campaign titled "#SaveMacGyver." Within 48 hours a hashtag calling for the renewal of the series trended on Twitter in multiple countries, gaining over 116,000 tweets in support. A Change.org petition with the same goal raised over 29,000 signatures. 1.35 million paperclips, a signature tool of Angus MacGyver's were sent to CBS Studio Center in Los Angeles, California, with several thousand more sent directly to Kahl's office in New York City. Numerous billboards were also purchased in effort of the campaign.

Following the series finale, Macer shared her plans for a sixth season in an interview. The planned sixth season would have included a Black Hawk Down-style episode centered around Tran's character, Desi, and her presumed dead ex-fiancé, Evan. This storyline would have allowed a romance between MacGyver and Riley, the characters of Till and Mays, respectively; who would have gotten together early in the sixth season. In 2022 Lenkov also shared his original plans for a fifth season finale that also would have set up a sixth season. In a rough scriptment for the fifth season finale, titled "Biometric + Compass + Paperclip + Family + Goodbye", the episode would have featured a time jump to the year 2035 that introduced the future son of MacGyver and Riley. The time jump would have also led to a relationship between MacGyver and Riley early in the sixth season. In Macer's version of the sixth season Desi and Evan would have begun a relationship; Riley then would have attempted to resign from the Phoenix Foundation, causing a fight between MacGyver and Riley that led to their first kiss. Other storylines for Macer's sixth season would have included Cusick's and Arfwedson's characters having a child; further exploration of the parents of Hires' character; and Eaton's character assigning Riley to an undercover project.

== Release ==
The season premiered during the 2020–21 television season as part of CBS's Friday lineup with Magnum P.I. and Blue Bloods. On August 26, 2020, it was announced that CBS hoped to begin airing the season in November 2020. On November 9, 2020, it was announced that the season would premiere on December 4, 2020.

== Viewing figures ==
Viewership and ratings per episode of MacGyver (2016 TV series) season 5
No.	Title	Air date	Rating (18–49)	Viewers (millions)	DVR (18–49)	DVR viewers (millions)	Total (18–49)	Total viewers (millions)
1	"Resort + Desi + Riley + Window Cleaner + Witness"	December 4, 2020	0.5	4.90	0.3	1.20	0.8	6.10
2	"Thief + Painting + Auction + Viro-486 + Justice"	December 11, 2020	0.5	4.79	0.2	0.94	0.7	5.73
3	"Eclipse + USMC-1856707 + Step Potential + Chain Lock + Ma"	December 18, 2020	0.5	4.72	—N/a	—N/a	—N/a	—N/a
4	"Banh Bao + Sterno + Drill + Burner + Mason"	Jauaury 8, 2021	0.6	5.17	0.2	1.21	0.8	6.39
5	"Jack + Kinematics + Safe Cracker + MgKNO3 + GTO"	January 15, 2021	0.6	4.99	0.2	1.11	0.8	6.10
6	"Quarantine + N95 + Landline + Telescope + Social Distance"	January 22, 2021	0.6	4.99	—N/a	—N/a	—N/a	—N/a
7	"Golden Lancehead + Venom + Pole Vault + Blood + Baggage"	February 5, 2021	0.5	5.16	—N/a	—N/a	—N/a	—N/a
8	"SOS + Hazmat + Ultrasound + Frequency + Malihini"	February 12, 2021	0.5	4.73	—N/a	1.32	—N/a	6.06
9	"Rails + Pitons + Pulley + Pipe + Salt"	February 19, 2021	0.6	4.96	—N/a	1.12	—N/a	6.16
10	"Diamond + Quake + Carbon + Comms + Tower"	March 5, 2021	0.5	4.50	0.2	1.27	0.7	5.77
11	"C8H7ClO + Nano-Trackers + Resistance + Maldives + Mind Games"	March 26, 2021	0.4	4.31	—N/a	—N/a	—N/a	—N/a
12	"Royalty + Marriage + Vivaah Sanskar + Zinc + Henna"	April 2, 2021	0.5	4.34	—N/a	—N/a	—N/a	—N/a
13	"Barn Find + Engine Oil + La Punzonatura + Lab Rats + Tachometer"	April 9, 2021	0.5	4.73	0.2	1.12	0.7	5.89
14	"H2O + Orthophosphates + Mission City + Corrosion + Origins"	April 16, 2021	0.5	4.33	0.2	1.11	0.6	5.44
15	"Abduction + Memory + Time + Fireworks + Dispersal"	April 30, 2021	0.5	4.48	0.2	1.14	0.7	5.62
