= The Rising (MacGyver) =

- MacGyver episode
- Episode no.: Season 1 Episode 1
- Directed by: James Wan
- Story by: Peter M. Lenkov & Paul Downs Colaizzo
- Teleplay by: Peter M. Lenkov
- Production code: MAC101
- Original air date: September 23, 2016

Guest appearances
- Tracy Spiridakos as Nikki Carpenter; Vinnie Jones as John Kendrick; Cory Scott Allen as Vincent the Director; India Batson as Tiffany; Alessandro Folchitto as Doorman; Elizabeth Tavares as Lead Tech/Dying; Kenneth Israel as Pilot; Michael E. Sanders as Co-Pilot; Craig Newman as Lead Tech DXS; Don Dipetta as Armed Guard

Episode chronology
← Previous —	Next → "Metal Saw"
- MacGyver (2016 TV series) season 1

"The Rising" is the first episode of the first season of the 2016 reboot of MacGyver. It aired on September 23, 2016. The story for the episode was written by Peter M. Lenkov and Paul Downs Colaizzo. The teleplay was also written by Peter M. Lenkov. The episode was directed by James Wan.

== Plot ==
Angus "Mac" MacGyver, with help from Jack Dalton and Nikki Carpenter, infiltrates a party to steal a biological weapon. As Mac and Jack meet up with Nikki, they find her held hostage by John Kendrick. Mac gives up the bio-weapon, but Kendrick shoots both him and Nikki, killing her. Three months later, Mac is on holiday when his boss, Patricia Thornton of the Department of External Services (DXS), calls him and Jack back to help retrieve the bio-weapon. They recruit convicted hacker Riley Davis, who tracks Kendrick to San Francisco, where they also discover that Nikki is alive and working with him. After capturing them, Mac finds out that Nikki has sold the bio-weapon to someone who plans on making it airborne via an IED. Mac finds the bio-weapon and extracts it from the IED before it explodes. A few days later, Thornton tells the group that Nikki's betrayal caused the DXS to become public, so they have to shut down and relocate under a new name. Mac chooses the name Phoenix, to which the rest of the group agrees. Nikki is arrested by the FBI but disappears during transport, leaving the cuffs behind with a hairpin.

== Production ==
The series was first announced as being in development on October 2, 2015, with R. Scott Gemmill, James Wan, Henry Winkler, and Michael Clear. On February 2, 2016, the series was given the green light to produce a pilot, with Paul Downs Colaizzo replacing Gemmill as writer. On March 8, 2016, David Von Ancken replaced Wan as the director of the pilot. On May 13, 2016, CBS ordered the series, and Peter M. Lenkov replaced Colaizzo and Brett Mahoney as showrunner. On June 16, 2016, Wan was rehired as the director for the pilot.

=== Casting ===
On March 8, 2016, George Eads was cast as Lincoln, "a man who could easily be written off as an eccentric conspiracy theorist but he's a legit government employee with great capability for compassion." On March 21, 2016, Lucas Till was cast as Angus MacGyver and Joshua Boone was cast as Gunner, "MacGyver's best friend from high school." On March 28, 2016, Addison Timlin and Michelle Krusiec, were cast as Mickey, "an app developer who's aggressively progressive in her political views with a soft spot for MacGyver", and as Agent Croix, "Lincoln's sister who works for the Department of Homeland Security." On May 13, 2016, CBS retooled the series, with only Till and Eads staying, with Eads now playing Jack Dalton. On June 14, 2016, Justin Hires was cast as Wilt Bozer, "MacGyver's ambitious roommate". On July 15, 2016, Sandrine Holt was cast as Patricia Thornton, "an ex-field agent turned director of operations for DXS. She doesn't let the title 'Boss' stand in her way and is always willing to join the team in the field - meaning that she's not going to let those under her have all the fun." On July 27, 2016, Tristin Mays was cast as Riley Davis, "a highly unpredictable computer hacker who isn't exactly thrilled to be working alongside MacGyver and his team - but it sure beats rotting in prison, right?"

== Reception ==
=== Viewing figures ===
In the United States the episode was watched live by 10.90 million viewers. Within seven days, the episode was watched by a total of 14.11 million viewers.

=== Critical response ===
Matt Fowler of IGN said, "It's just a flat, glossy front-loaded spectacle that values quips and quirks over drama. It's spray cheese on saltines. The pilot episode ... may be filled chases and fights and all sorts of ticking time-bomb action, but there's nothing underneath. ... Plus, the science isn't even all that impressive. Look, you tune into MacGyver to see him MacGyver, but there's nothing here that'll exactly blow your mind, and MacGyver's choice to walk into dangerous situations with a clear intent to "improvise" his way out of things should the mission go wrong is a little annoying."

== See also ==
- List of MacGyver (2016 TV series) episodes
- MacGyver (2016 TV series) season 1
