= Flashlight (MacGyver) =

- MacGyver episode
- Episode no.: Season 1 Episode 18
- Directed by: Jonathan Brown
- Written by: Lindsay Allen
- Production code: MAC118
- Original air date: March 10, 2017

Guest appearances
- Daniel Dae Kim as Chin Ho Kelly; Grace Park as Kono Kalakaua; Taylor Wily as Kamekona

Episode chronology
← Previous "Ruler"	Next → "Compass"
- MacGyver (2016 TV series) season 1

"Flashlight" is the eighteenth episode of the first season of MacGyver. It aired on March 10, 2017. The episode was written by Lindsay Allen and directed by Jonathan Brown. The episode was a crossover with Hawaii Five-0. Daniel Dae Kim, Grace Park, and Taylor Wily, crossed over as Chin Ho Kelly, Kono Kalakaua, and Kamekona, respectively.

== Plot ==
The Phoenix team gets rerouted to Hilo, Hawaii, to help after an earthquake. MacGyver and Jack work with Chin Ho Kelly and Kono Kalakaua of the Hawaii Five-0 Task Force, to save a group of government scientists trapped in a building, while also trying to stop a team of Chinese soldiers attempting to steal confidential experiments. They are able to save the scientists before the soldiers attack the building. Meanwhile, Bozer rescues a dog, and a makes a splint for the dog's broken leg. He then works with Kamekona to try and return the dog to its owner. MacGyver, Jack, Kono, and Chin, follow the Chinese soldiers to the beach, where they have a standoff, before eventually managing to stop the soldiers. Lastly, MacGyver decides to let Jack throw him a birthday party, which Kamekona caters.

== Production ==
Both MacGyver and Hawaii Five-0 had made references to each other previously, with Jack having mentioned knowing Five-0 leader, Lieutenant Commander Steve McGarrett, and Chin Ho Kelly having mentioned the Phoenix Foundation.

=== Casting ===
The episode featured three crossover appearances from Hawaii Five-0: Daniel Dae Kim as Chin Ho Kelly, Grace Park as Kono Kalakaua, and Taylor Wily as Kamekona. It was also the first episode to feature Meredith Eaton as a main cast member.

== Reception ==
=== Viewing figures ===
In the United States the episode was watched live by 7.73 million viewers. Within seven days, the episode was watched by a total of 10.02 million viewers.

=== Critical response ===
Tashy Cerny of Tracking Board said, "not the strongest structured episode the show has produced this season, but the action and the storyline was definitely of merit. Earthquake relief effort-turned sniper chase was definitely a new plot move for the show, and it is much appreciated. It’s clear that the show still struggles to fit into its role as somewhat of a mini-action movie, but there’s no doubt with each episode the essence of what this MacGyver reboot is gets stronger and more defined." She also gave the episode a rating of a B.

== See also ==
- List of MacGyver (2016 TV series) episodes
- MacGyver (2016 TV series) season 1
