= Michael Gilden =

American actor (1962–2006)

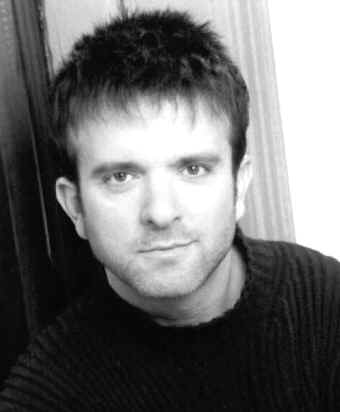
- Born: September 22, 1962; Los Angeles, California, U.S.
- Died: December 5, 2006 (aged 44); Los Angeles, California, U.S.
- Height: 4 ft (122 cm)
- Spouse: Meredith Eaton (m. 2001)

Michael Jeffrey Gilden (September 22, 1962 – December 5, 2006) was an American actor with dwarfism.

== Biography ==
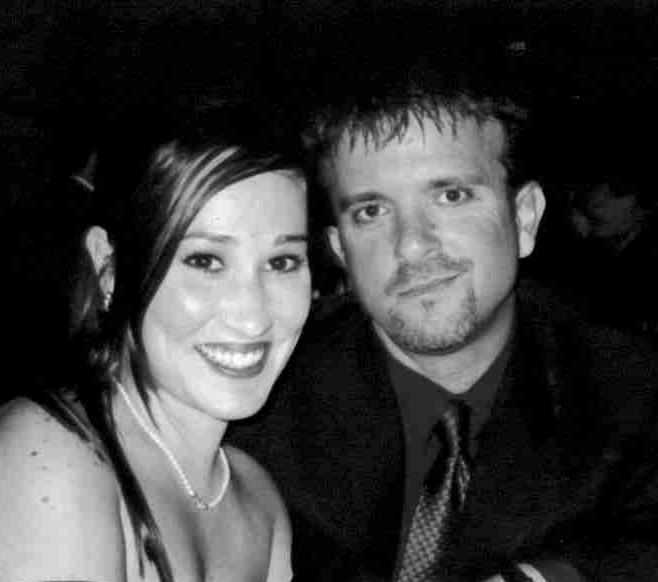
With Meredith Eaton-Gilden

The 4-foot (1.2 m)-tall Gilden had a form of dwarfism. He lived and worked in Los Angeles.

Gilden performed or did stunt work in a variety of television series and films, including Charmed, CSI: Crime Scene Investigation, Family Law, Cybill, NCIS and Pulp Fiction (the page in the Jack Rabbit Slim scene), and had a role as an Ewok in the film Return of the Jedi. He appeared twice in Season 4 of NCIS. Gilden was also a Financial Advisor.

In August 1997, he met Meredith Eaton through mutual friends in Atlanta, Georgia. Gilden encouraged Eaton to pursue a career in acting, and she became an actress in 1999. The couple married on May 20, 2001.

Gilden died by suicide by hanging himself on December 5, 2006 in his Los Angeles home. He was 44.

== Filmography ==
=== Film ===
Year	Title	Role	Notes
1981	Under the Rainbow	Hotel Rainbow Guest	
1983	Star Wars: Episode VI – Return of the Jedi	Ewok #28	
1990	Nerds of a Feather	Little Army of Little Russian Soldiers	
1993	Freaked	Eye	
1994	Pulp Fiction	Phillip Morris Page	
2000	Once Upon a Christmas	Dunder	TV movie
2001	Snow White: The Fairest of Them All	Monday	TV movie
2002	CSI: Crime Scene Investigation	Lawrence Ames	Episode: "A Little Murder"
2003	Nudity Required	Little Dirk	
2006	NCIS	Marty Pearson	Two episodes
