= Unconditional Love (2002 film) =

- UK DVD cover
- Directed by: P. J. Hogan
- Written by: Jocelyn Moorhouse; P.J. Hogan
- Produced by: Jocelyn Moorhouse; Patricia Whitcher; Jerry Zucker
- Starring: Kathy Bates; Rupert Everett; Meredith Eaton; Peter Sarsgaard; Lynn Redgrave; Dan Aykroyd; Jonathan Pryce
- Cinematography: Remi Adefarasin
- Edited by: Robert C. Jones
- Music by: James Newton Howard
- Distributed by: New Line Cinema
- Release date: 23 August 2002 (UK)
- Running time: 121 minutes
- Country: United States
- Language: English

Unconditional Love is a 2002 American midlife reinvention comedy film co-written and directed by P. J. Hogan and starring Kathy Bates, Rupert Everett, Dan Aykroyd, and Meredith Eaton. The film follows Grace Beasley, an archetypal timid and repressed homemaker who, in the wake of a sudden, unexpected marital separation and her favorite pop star's untimely death, takes a plane to England to attend the entertainer's funeral. The film was released in the United Kingdom on 23 August 2002.

== Plot ==
Grace Beasley is a content but timid housewife in Chicago. One morning, she wins tickets to a concert for her favorite singer, Victor Fox, just as her husband, Max, tells her he wants a divorce, citing a need for more variety and excitement in his life and expressing a dislike of her frequent singing. Soon afterward, Grace discovers that her son Andrew is also divorcing his wife, Maudey.

At the Victor Fox concert, Grace learns the event has been cancelled and is stunned to later discover that the singer has been murdered. She decides to go to England to attend the funeral, and sees a dedication to Victor Fox in the newspaper defining unconditional love, signed "D.S." While sending flowers to the service, Grace discovers another arrangement has already used the same phrase—Victor's valet, Dirk Simpson. She persuades the florist to give her the address and goes to Victor Fox's home, where Dirk is wallowing in grief.

Grace is approached by members of Victor's family, who believe she is a recording executive because she is American. They tell her that Dirk claims he and Victor were lovers, which they deny, and ask her for help gaining access to Victor's home so they can take control of the property and his estate. When Grace reveals she is just a fan, however, they angrily reject her.

Grace's warmth and motherly nature win over Dirk, who reveals that Victor was rejected by his family for being gay and that he enjoyed dressing up in a tiara and pink feather boa as a child. He also tells Grace he plans to get revenge by going to Chicago to track down and kill the serial killer who murdered Victor. Before they leave, Dirk and Grace talk their way into the funeral home to dress Victor's body in a tiara and pink feather boa, which scandalizes his relatives at the funeral.

In the US, Maudey joins Grace and Dirk's effort to hunt down the Crossbow Killer, who has killed several people in Chicago, including Victor Fox. The trio is arrested due to a misunderstanding, and at the police station Maudey and Andrew reconcile, while Max expresses a desire to reunite with Grace.

Grace chooses to go back to Max, disappointing Dirk, but is disheartened to find he no longer wants adventure and new experiences, but rather to return to the life they had before. Realizing this is not what she wants, Grace meets Maudey and finds Dirk dressed as Victor and loudly playing his music in the parking garage where he was murdered.

The trio are confronted by the Crossbow Killer, revealed to be a deranged window washer who hates singing because it reminds him of his abusive mother, so sing to distract him. Grace is terrified but finds the courage to outsmart the killer. She, Dirk and Maudey overpower the killer and lead the police to him.

Weeks later, Grace and Dirk appear on a talk show, where they are celebrated for their bravery. Dirk announces that the Fox family have decided to turn Victor's home into a sanctuary for homeless gay youth, and Victor's relatives, faced with bad publicity, are forced to comply. Max stands up in the audience and requests that Grace sing for everyone, showing he is trying to change. Barry Manilow takes the stage and sings a duet with her.

== Cast ==
- Kathy Bates as Grace Beasley
- Rupert Everett as Dirk Simpson
- Meredith Eaton as Maudey
- Lynn Redgrave as Nola Fox
- Stephanie Beacham as Harriet Fox-Smith
- Richard Briers as Barry Moore
- Dan Aykroyd as Max Beasley
- Jonathan Pryce as Victor Fox
- Pat Finn as Keith
- Peter Sarsgaard as Window Washer
- Bitty Schram as Waitress
- Sarah Peirse as Florist
- Roddy Maude-Roxby as Minister
- Barry Manilow as himself
- Julie Andrews as herself

== Critical reception ==
The film was shot in late 1999 and early 2000 in Chicago and England, but New Line Cinema continually postponed the American release, leaving the film on the shelf until finally premiering it on the Starz network in August 2003 and then sending it direct-to-DVD that October.

The film has received mostly negative reviews from film critics. Christopher Null wrote, "It's a sloppy mishmash of stories...none of which stand on their own and which crash disastrously when combined. Bates comes off as dippy and distant. Everett comes of [sic] as mean and crusty. Pryce is just inexplicable with a gray pompadour and blue sequins. And Manilow rocks. Er..."

Jason Bovberg had slightly kinder things to say about the film. "As a dark comedy, Unconditional Love can be occasionally effective. There are a few moments in this film that had me laughing quite hysterically. Merely the sight of Jonathan Pryce shuffle-dancing through clouds over the opening credits loads the film with promise. And Meredith Eaton as Maudey steals every scene she's in. But in the end, you can't escape the fact that Bates has difficulty carrying this movie and in fact, doesn't seem to really understand the type of film she's in."

== DVD ==
The film is available on DVD and includes the film's trailer, and a deleted scene.
