= Madam Secretary =

Madam Secretary may refer to:

- "Madam Secretary", a term of address for females with the Secretary (title), such as cabinet secretaries presiding over governmental bodies.
- Madam Secretary (book), the 2003 autobiography of United States Secretary of State Madeleine Albright
- Madam Secretary (TV series), a U.S. political drama television series (2014–2019)
