= Jonathan Brown (cinematographer) =

American cinematographer and television director

- Born: 17 February 1970 (age 56); Philadelphia, United States
- Years active: 1995–2020 (Cinematography); 2017–present (Director)

Jonathan Brown is an American cinematographer and television director.

== Early life ==
In June 2008, Brown was invited to join the Academy of Motion Picture Arts and Sciences.

== Career ==
Brown began his career as a camera operator and Steadicam operator, with credits including Four Rooms (1995), Gattaca (1997) and Cement(2000), before becoming a director of photography. He shot several of Shawn Levy's comedies, including Big Fat Liar (2002), Just Married and Cheaper by the Dozen (both 2003), and The Pink Panther (2006).

=== Transition to directing ===
Brown was the original director of photography on the CBS series Madam Secretary. According to cinematographer Learan Kahanov, who was hired as the show's A-camera operator, the showrunner and Brown said during his interview that they wanted someone who could potentially take over the cinematography, because Brown wanted to direct. Brown subsequently directed seven episodes of the series between 2015 and 2017 and went on to direct episodes of other network dramas

== Filmography ==
=== Cinematographer ===
Film

Year	Title	Director	Notes
1999	Dill Scallion	Jordan Brady	
1999	Pros & Cons	Boris Damast	
2000	Backroads	Shirley Cheechoo	
2002	Big Fat Liar	Shawn Levy	
2002	The Third Wheel	Jordan Brady	
2003	Just Married	Shawn Levy	
2003	Cheaper by the Dozen	Shawn Levy	
2004	Without a Paddle	Steven Brill	
2005	The Family Stone	Thomas Bezucha	
2006	The Pink Panther	Shawn Levy	
2006	School for Scoundrels	Todd Phillips	
2007	Mama's Boy	Tim Hamilton	
2011	Monte Carlo	Thomas Bezucha	
2013	The Big Wedding	Justin Zackham	
2013	The Internship	Shawn Levy	
2014	Walk of Shame	Steven Brill	
2014	The Rewrite	Marc Lawrence	

Television

Year	Title	Director	Notes
2000	Manhattan, AZ	Boris Damast	Episode "Brown Parcels of Land"
2014-2016	Madam Secretary		34 episodes
2020	Council of Dads	James Strong	Episode "Pilot"

=== Director ===
Television

Year	Title	Director	Executive Producer	Notes
2015–2017	Madam Secretary	Yes	No	7 episodes
2017	MacGyver	Yes	No	Episode "Flashlight"
2017	Doubt	Yes	No	Episode "Top Dog/Underdog"
2018	How to Get Away with Murder	Yes	No	Episodes "Everything We Did Was for Nothing" and "We Can Find Him"
2019	Almost Family	Yes	No	Episode "Notorious AF"
2020	Council of Dads	Yes	Yes	Episodes "Who Do You Wanna Be?" and "Stormy Weather"
2022–2026	Chicago Med	Yes	Yes	5 episodes
2022–2024	FBI: International	Yes	No	6 episodes
2022–2024	Law & Order: Organized Crime	Yes	No	Episodes "Can't Knock the Hustle", "Blood Ties" and "Deliver Us from Evil"
2025	Countdown	Yes	Yes	4 episodes
2026	FBI	Yes	No	Episode: "Atonement"
