= Paul Downs Colaizzo =

American playwright and film director

- Born: June 27, 1985 (age 41); Pittsburgh, Pennsylvania, US
- Education: New York University (BFA)
- Occupation: Playwright

Paul Downs Colaizzo (/kəˈleɪzoʊ/) is an American playwright, screenwriter and film director.

== Early life and education ==
Colaizzo was born in Pittsburgh, Pennsylvania and raised in Alpharetta, Georgia.

He received his Bachelor of Fine Arts from New York University in New York City.

== Career ==
Colaizzo's play Really Really premiered at The Signature Theatre in Arlington, Virginia in January 2012, breaking Signature Theatre box office records. A new production opened Off-Broadway at the Lucille Lortel Theater in January 2013 starring Zosia Mamet and Matt Lauria and directed by David Cromer, as part of MCC's 2012–2013 season. The MCC production was sold-out and twice extended. Colaizzo stepped into the play for three performances in the role of Johnson while actor Kobi Libii filmed a television pilot.

Colaizzo's play Pride in the Falls of Autrey Mill premiered at The Signature Theatre in Arlington, Virginia in autumn of 2013 starring Christine Lahti. A reading of the play, held in New York City in October 2011, was directed by David Schwimmer and produced by Jeffrey Richards. It starred Julie White and Jonathan Groff.

Colaizzo served as the Script Associate for the musical Sister Act, contributing additional book material with Douglas Carter Beane.

In 2015, Colaizzo's medical drama LFE was picked up to pilot by CBS. It starred Melissa Leo, Daniel Sharman, and Brandon Micheal Hall. Later that year, Colaizzo inked a 2-year overall deal with CBS, during which he served as an executive producer and co-writer for the pilot episode for the network's reboot of MacGyver.

In November 2017, it was announced Colaizzo would direct Brittany Runs a Marathon, starring Jillian Bell, from a screenplay he wrote, and would also serve as an executive producer.

== Personal life ==
Colaizzo resides in New York City.
