= Lee David Zlotoff =

American film director

- Born: July 10, 1954 (age 72); New York City, New York, United States
- Occupations: Producer, director, screenwriter
- Known for: MacGyver

Lee David Zlotoff (born July 10, 1954) is a producer, director and screenwriter best known as the creator of the TV series MacGyver. He started as a screenwriter for Hill Street Blues in 1981. He then became a producer of Remington Steele in 1982.

== Early life and education ==
Zlotoff graduated from Brooklyn Technical High School in 1970. He then attended St. John's College in Annapolis, Maryland.

== Career ==
Zlotoff created MacGyver, which ran on ABC between 1985 and 1992 and was sold throughout the world. He then produced the television series The Man from Snowy River (Australian title: Banjo Paterson's The Man from Snowy River — American title: Snowy River: The McGregor Saga). The series was based on the Banjo Paterson poem "The Man from Snowy River".

He wrote and directed the 1996 film The Spitfire Grill, which won the Audience Award at the Sundance Film Festival and was nominated for the Grand Jury Prize.

At the 2008 Maker Faire, Zlotoff announced his interest in a MacGyver movie. Zlotoff said he had full control of the movie after obtaining the rights several years ago. He also has written two of the episodes for the TV series NCIS in season 3 and season 7 of the series.

In 2010, a feature film version of the Saturday Night Live parody of MacGyver, MacGruber, prompted Zlotoff to send cease-and-desist letters and threaten further legal action.

Zlotoff served as executive producer of the 2016 reboot of MacGyver.

He contributes to Make magazine.
