= Organizations in MacGyver (1985 TV series) =

There are various fictional organizations in the 1985–1992 American television series MacGyver.

== DXS Department of External Services ==
The DXS is a U.S. intelligence agency where MacGyver and Peter Thornton are employed during the first season. It is revealed that MacGyver had been working there since 1979, when he was recruited by Pete. At the beginning of Season 2, both of them leave for the Phoenix Foundation, but DXS agents still reappear throughout the series, sometimes as allies and sometimes as antagonists. While in their employ, MacGyver was usually sent overseas to rescue Americans in danger, locate or destroy sensitive equipment, or ordinary intelligence-gathering operations; however, other sections of the DXS are much more susceptible to corruption and have been seen trying to kidnap foreign heads of state or interfering with democratic elections, among other things.

== Phoenix Foundation ==
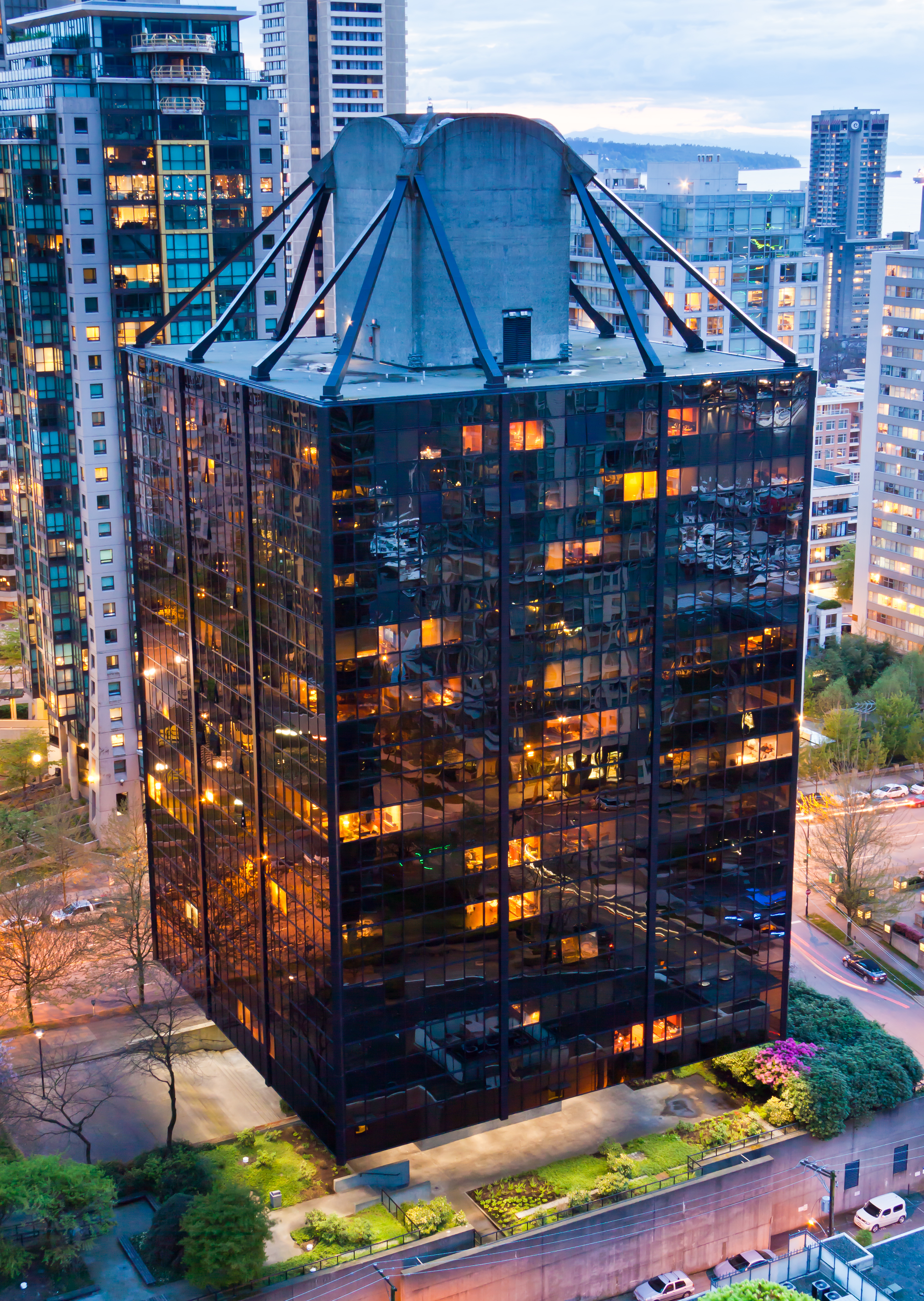
The Qube building in Vancouver served as the Phoenix Foundation Headquarters

A non-profit think tank and government contractor that employs Peter Thornton (as Director of Field Operations) and MacGyver (as field agent and "troubleshooter") in Seasons 2 through 7. It often cooperates with government agencies, particularly the police or intelligence community (as MacGyver puts it, "we don't have to cut through as much red tape"). It also does a great deal of work on its own: environmental surveys and clean-up operations, anti-drug initiatives, social programs, etc. The Phoenix Foundation is described as a "corporate white knight", an entity trusted and respected by the general public for its integrity. One of the organization's main aims during the 1980s and early 1990s was the socially responsible furthering of technologies within the United States, such as computer applications and systems and applied biosciences.

Initially located in a high-security building designed and built by Lawton Enterprises, we later find that the foundation has another facility which seems to consist entirely of underground laboratories. Both facilities have a "hi-tech" look, and incorporate a variety of advanced technologies, from security to inventory management. The foundation provided secure research and development facilities to the U.S. military.

The Phoenix Foundation was active in many areas of research and development other than military; these included such things as law enforcement, environmental research and protection initiatives, and public assistance programs such as hearing restoration for the deaf. They also provided consultation services such as mediation and negotiation, witness protection reassignment, environmental impact consultation, to name but a few.

A number of foundation staff were ex-DXS agents who saw the foundation as a way of continuing the peace process they started at the DXS. Most of them maintained their security clearances, which helped the foundation to work around red tape and politics to get speedier results than other agencies. Some foundation signs mention a "Western Division", suggesting it has other divisions, possibly around the country or worldwide, although this was never confirmed in any episode.

The Phoenix Foundation is also the covert organization masquerading as a think tank in the 2016 reboot of the series.

== Homicide International Trust ==
Appropriately shorthanded to "HIT", they are an international fraternity of assassins, employing killers from around the world to carry out their contracts. Murdoc was employed by them until he tried to retire; the organization reacted by putting a hit on him as punishment for his repeated failures, forcing him to ask for MacGyver's help in order to save himself and his sister. He later tries to rejoin their ranks, and is rejected when he tries and fails to kill MacGyver (again).

== Challengers' Club ==
A Boys & Girls Club that provides shelter for inner-city kids in need of help (recovering drug addicts, former prostitutes, orphans). It was founded by Booker and Cynthia Wilson, and by the end of the series was run solely by Cynthia (after her husband was killed by a neighborhood racist in the season 4 episode "The Challenge"). MacGyver is often involved with them and will sometimes use his connections in the Phoenix Foundation to secure funding or other forms of help.
