= Justin Hires =

American actor and stand-up comedian (born 1985)

- Born: June 24, 1985 (age 41); St. Petersburg, Florida, U.S.
- Occupation: Actor
- Years active: 2007–present
- Height: 5 ft 6 in (168 cm)

Justin Hires (born June 24, 1985) is an American actor and stand-up comedian. Hires is known for portraying Detective James Carter on the CBS television series Rush Hour, Juario in 21 Jump Street, and Wilt Bozer in the 2016 reboot series of MacGyver.

== Early years ==
Hires was born on June 24, 1985, in St. Petersburg, Florida to Barbara Hires, who worked as an Area 2 superintendent for the schools of Pinellas County. Hires attended Gibbs High School in St. Petersburg, Florida, where he graduated. Hires attended and graduated from Clark Atlanta University with a Bachelor of Arts degree. He was also in many different Vines.

== Career ==
Hires landed minor roles in two feature films: Stomp the Yard and The Gospel. In 2015, Hires joined the cast of the television series Rush Hour as Detective James Carter. In June 2016, Hires was cast in the MacGyver reboot series as Wilt Bozer.

In 2017, Hires wrote and was set to star in Homecoming, a film acquired by Tucker Tooley Entertainment and executive produced by 50 Cent, however, the film was never made. He later wrote the screenplay for the Half Baked sequel, Half Baked: Totally High.

== Filmography ==
Film
Year	Title	Role	Notes
2005	The Gospel	Youngster	
2007	Stomp the Yard	Byron	
2012	21 Jump Street	Juario	
2013	Slightly Single in L.A.	Bar Guy	
2014	10 Cent Pistol	Jayson	
2024	Half Baked: Totally High	Curtis	Writer

Television
Year	Title	Role	Notes
2009	Disaster Date	Various characters	2 episodes
2011	In the Flow with Affion Crockett	Various characters	Episode: "No Rush!"
2012–2015	Key and Peele	Laron's Friend #3, Bystander #1	4 episodes
2014	Jerks with Cameras	Jerk	8 episodes
2015–2016	TripTank	Skinny, Caller, Malcolm, George, Seahorse, Turtle (voice)	5 episodes
2016	Rush Hour	Detective James Carter	Main role, 13 episodes
2016–2021	MacGyver	Wilt Bozer	Main role, 94 episodes
2018	The Lion Guard	Hodari (voice)	Episode: "The Little Guy"
2025	Lil Kev	Chin Check, TV Announcer, Marcus Garvey Painting (voice)	3 episodes
