= Meredith Eaton =

American actress (born 1974)

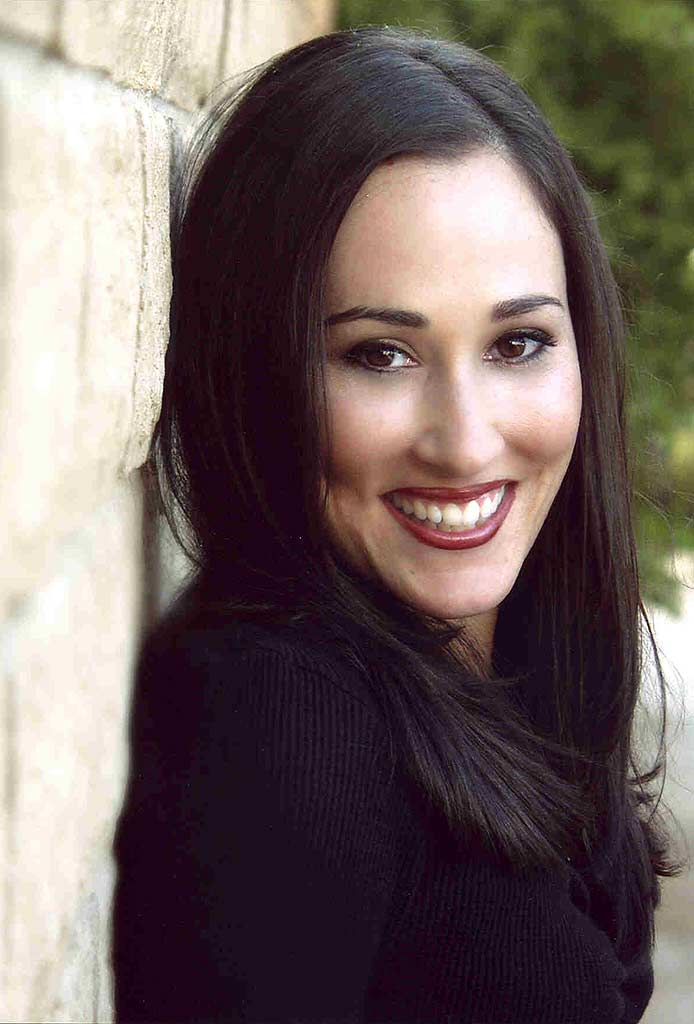
- Born: August 26, 1974 (age 52); Long Island, New York U.S.
- Occupation: Actress
- Years active: 1999–present
- Height: 122 cm (4 ft 0 in)
- Spouses: Michael Gilden (m. 2001; died 2006) Brian S. Gordon (m. 2008)
- Children: 1

Meredith Hope Eaton Gordon (sometimes credited as Meredith Eaton-Gilden; born August 26, 1974) is an American actress. She is known for portraying the attorney Emily Resnick on the CBS television series Family Law (in which she was the first female with dwarfism to fill a regular role in an American prime time series), for her recurring role as Bethany Horowitz on the ABC series Boston Legal, and for her lead role as Matilda "Matty" Webber on the CBS series MacGyver.

== Early life ==
Eaton was born on Long Island, New York, to a clinical social worker mother and an administrative law judge father. She attended Hofstra University in Hempstead, New York, where she was an active member of the Delta Phi Epsilon sorority; she graduated in 1996 with a degree in interdisciplinary studies, minoring in theater. In June 2007, she was named by Hofstra University as their Alumnus of the Month.

== Acting career ==
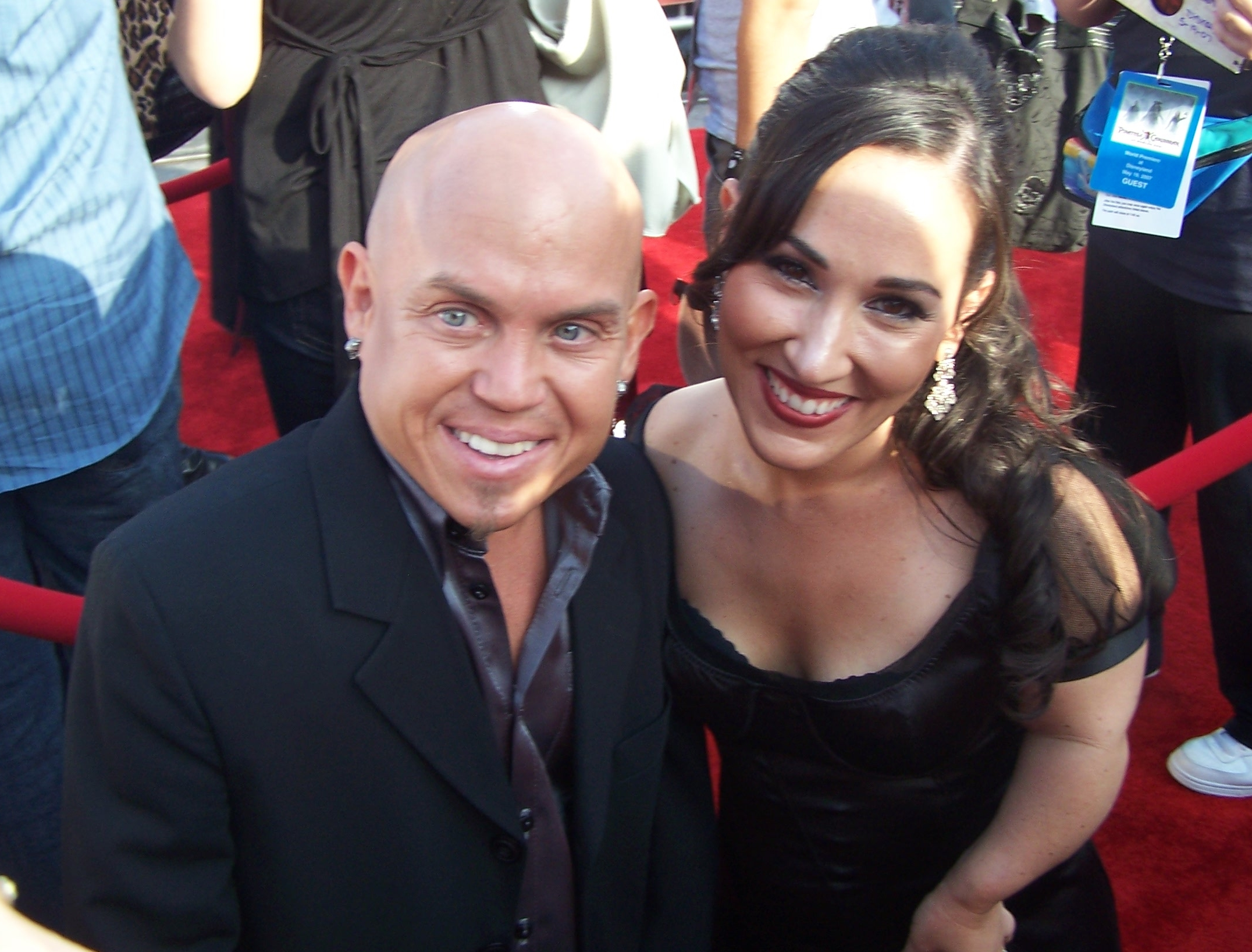
Eaton, right, at the premiere of Pirates of the Caribbean: At World's End, May 2007. (Pictured with Martin Klebba.)

Eaton's acting career began in 1999 when she attended an open casting call for the comedy film Unconditional Love. Despite its being her first audition, she won out over 500 women from Canada, the United States, and the United Kingdom to be cast in the role of Maudey Beasley.

Unconditional Love was not released until 2002. Her performance was seen by Paul Haggis, who created the role of Emily Resnick for her on Family Law. Joining the cast in 2002, she continued with the series until its cancellation later that same year. She later had significant guest appearances on NYPD Blue, Dharma & Greg, CSI: Crime Scene Investigation, House and NCIS. She also appeared as herself in Standing Tall at Auschwitz, which was a History Channel documentary on the Ovitz family, and in No Bigger Than a Minute, an independent documentary on dwarfism which aired on the PBS program P.O.V.

In 2006, she joined the cast of Boston Legal as Bethany Horowitz, a love interest to William Shatner's character Denny Crane. The role was written specifically for her by David E. Kelley.

Eaton portrayed Carol Wilson, an immunologist who works for the CDC and is a friend of forensic scientist Abby Sciuto, on five episodes of CBS's NCIS and one episode of its spin-off NCIS: New Orleans. In 2013, Meredith starred opposite Christopher Walken and Bill Nighy in David Hare's Turks & Caicos. In 2016, Eaton became a series regular on the CBS show MacGyver. She played Matilda "Matty" Webber, MacGyver's boss and the new director of operations at The Phoenix Foundation.

== Personal life ==
Eaton earned a master's degree in clinical psychology from the Derner Institute of Advanced Psychological Studies at Adelphi University, where she achieved a 4.0 grade point average. Between her roles in Family Law and Boston Legal, Eaton worked as a psychotherapist with patients in a locked unit for the criminally insane at a Los Angeles hospital. She would later credit her training in psychology for giving her a better ability to understand character dynamics in preparing for acting roles.

Eaton married Brian Gordon on October 12, 2008. Gordon is a professional photographer. They have one child together, a daughter.

Eaton was previously married to Michael Gilden from 2001 until his death in 2006.

== Filmography ==
=== Film ===
Year	Title	Role	Notes
2002	Unconditional Love	Maudey Beasley	
2009	Balls Out: Gary the Tennis Coach	Mrs. Tuttle	
2011	Paranormal Activity 3	Woman	
2013	Paranoia	Hospital Nurse #3	
2014	Veronica Mars	Receptionist	
2014	Paranormal Activity: The Marked Ones	Covena	
TBA	The Ones †	Kendra	Post-production

=== Television ===
Year	Title	Role	Notes
2001	NYPD Blue	Stella Kensington	Episode: "Family Ties"
2001	Dharma & Greg	Kate	Episode: "Pride & Prejudice"
2001–2002	Family Law	Emily Resnick	Main role
2002	CSI: Crime Scene Investigation	Melanie Grace	Episode: "A Little Murder"
2003	Mr. Ambassador	Melody	TV film
2006	House	Maddy Ralphean	Episode: "Merry Little Christmas"
2006–2008	Boston Legal	Bethany Horowitz	Recurring role
2007	Without a Trace	Brenda Spivak	Episode: "Claus and Effect"
2008	Law & Order: Special Victims Unit	Jocelyn Miller	Episode: "Inconceivable"
2009–2024	NCIS	Carol Wilson	5 episodes
2014	Turks & Caicos	Clare Clovis	TV film
2014	NCIS: New Orleans	Carol Wilson	Episode: "Carrier"
2015	Battle Creek	Meredith Oberling	Recurring role
2017–2021	MacGyver	Matilda "Matty" Webber	Main role
