= Tristin Mays =

American actress (born 1989)

- Mays on the set of DollHouse Destiny
- Born: June 20, 1989 (age 37)
- Occupation: Actress
- Years active: 1996–present

Tristin Michelle Mays (born June 20, 1989) is an American actress. Mays portrayed Riley Davis in the reboot of the MacGyver series on CBS who works as a covert operative for the Phoenix Foundation.

== Career ==
While best known for her role as Riley Davis on the 2016 CBS reboot of MacGyver, Mays has played in television series including as Shaina in the Nickelodeon series Gullah Gullah Island and as Robin Dixon, the daughter of Marcus Dixon in Alias.

Her other television credits include Ned's Declassified School Survival Guide, Everybody Hates Chris, True Jackson, VP, Zeke and Luther, Big Time Rush, Victorious and The Vampire Diaries as Sarah Salvatore.

At six years old, she joined the cast of Gullah Gullah Island in 1997, replacing Shaina M. Freeman as “Shaina”. In 1999, she was cast as Nala in The Lion King on Broadway. She subsequently played Fan in Dickens' A Christmas Carol. She also appeared in the TV show Impractical Jokers season 8 episode 5.

== Filmography ==
=== Film ===
Year	Title	Role	Notes
2011	Hot Dog Water	Julia	Short film
2012	Thunderstruck	Isabela Sanchez	
2012	She is Not My Sister	Megan	
2013	House Party: Tonight's the Night	Autumn Rose	Direct-to-video film
2015	The Wedding Ringer	Cute bridesmaid	
2020	The Christmas Sitters	Nora	Direct-to-TV film

=== Television ===
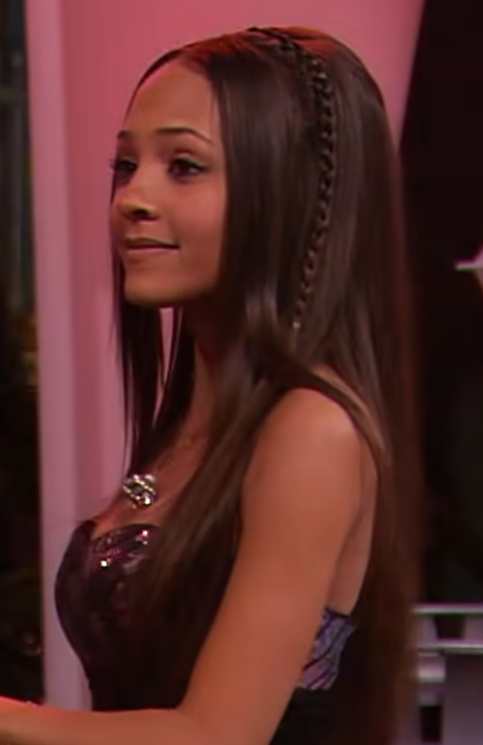
Mays on the show Victorious in 2011

Year	Title	Role	Notes
1996	Harambee!	Angel	Television film
1997	Gullah Gullah Island	Shaina	Series regular
2001–2004	Alias	Robin Dixon	3 episodes
2006	Ned's Declassified School Survival Guide	Bernice	Episode: "Substitute Teachers and the New Kid"
2008	Everybody Hates Chris	Jenise Huckstable	Episode: "Everybody Hates Homecoming"
2009	Private	Taylor Bell	Web series; series regular
2010	True Jackson, VP	Hailey	Episode: "My Boss Ate My Homework"
2010–2011	Zeke and Luther	Monica Lopez	3 episodes
2010	Big Time Rush	Stephanie King	2 episodes
2010	Kelly Brook's Cameltoe Shows	Herself	Funny or Die skit
2011	Victorious	Sherry	Episode: "Prom Wrecker"
2011	FAIL	Alicia	Web series; series regular
2011	Kickin' It	Vanessa / M.C.	Episode: "All the Wrong Moves"
2012	The Newsroom	Karaoke Girl	Episode: "The 112th Congress"
2015–2016	The Vampire Diaries	Sarah Nelson/Salvatore	Recurring role (season 6), Guest (season 8) 7 episodes
2015	Supergirl	Maxwell Lord's Assistant	Episode: "Childish Things"
2015	Night of the Wild	Rosalyn	Television film
2016–2018	T@gged	Brie	
2016–2021	MacGyver	Riley Davis	Main role
2017	Switched at Birth	Ally	3 episodes
2019	Impractical Jokers	Herself	Season 8 Episode 5: "Full Mental Jacket"
