= MacGyver =

Fictional character and title character of MacGyver

- MacGyver character
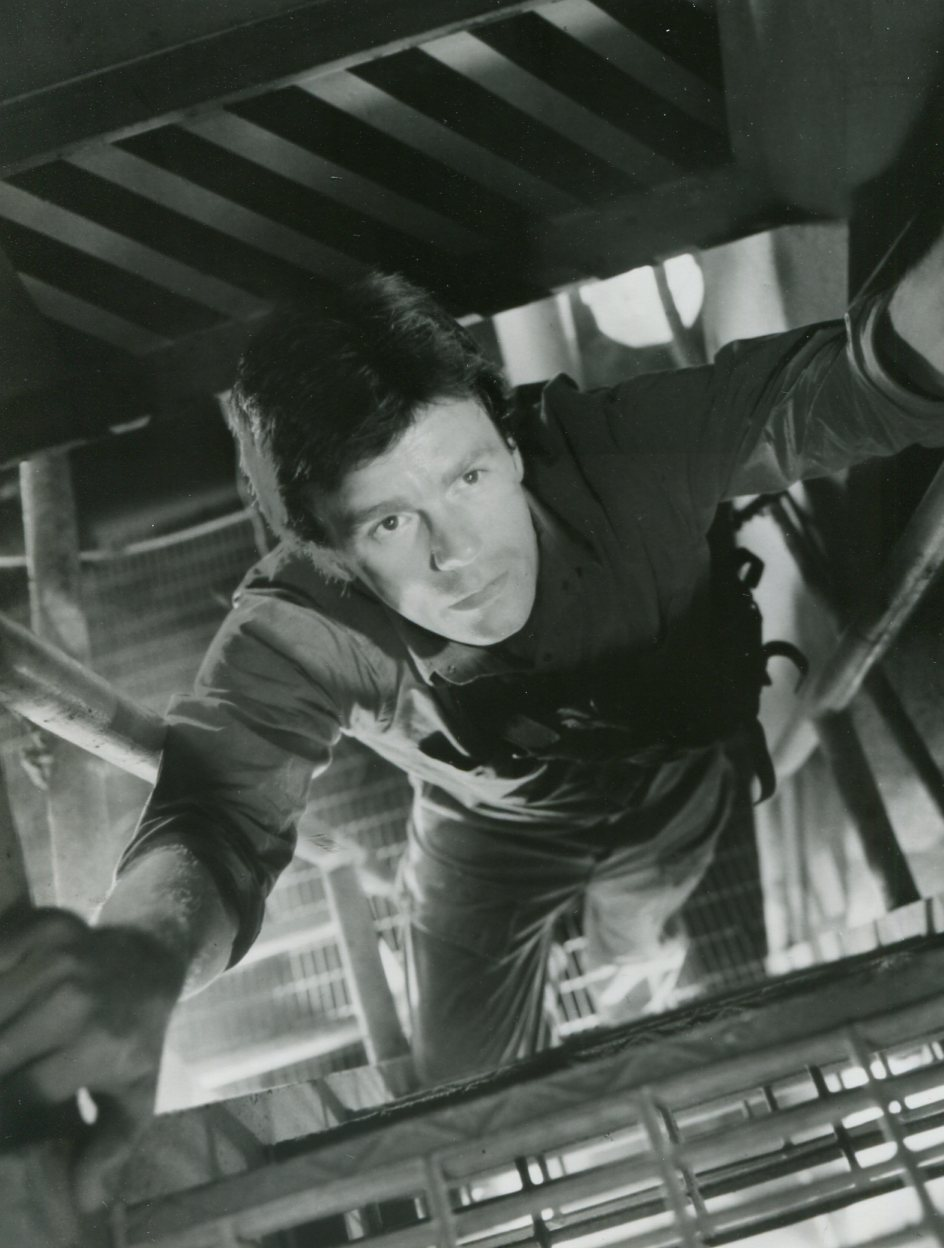
- Richard Dean Anderson as MacGyver
- First appearance: "Pilot"
- Last appearance: "Trail to Doomsday"
- Created by: Lee David Zlotoff
- Portrayed by: Richard Dean Anderson Other: Sean Wohland (young)

In-universe information
- Children: Sean Angus "Sam" Malloy (son)

Angus "Mac" MacGyver is the title character and the protagonist in the TV series MacGyver. He is played by Richard Dean Anderson in the original 1985 series. Lucas Till portrays a younger version of MacGyver in the 2016 reboot.

In both portrayals, MacGyver is shown to possess a genius-level intellect, proficiency in multiple languages, superb engineering skills, excellent knowledge of applied physics, military training in bomb disposal techniques, and a preference for non-lethal resolutions to conflicts. MacGyver works for the fictional Phoenix Foundation in Los Angeles, which in the original series was an independent think tank, and in the 2016 reboot is a clandestine government organization using the cover of a think tank. In addition to his scientific knowledge and inventive use of common items, he always carries a Swiss Army knife and refuses to carry a gun.

== MacGyver (1985–1992 original series, 1994 specials) ==
=== Personality ===
MacGyver is a non-violent problem solver and typically eschews the use of guns. (Note: In the first episode of the series, MacGyver fires an AK-47 at some Soviet soldiers. His dislike of firearms was established in subsequent episodes.) His violent actions are performed in self-defense, and he takes non-fatal action when possible.

MacGyver is depicted as an ally to social and environmental causes. He aids vulnerable populations throughout the series. During vineyard worker strikes, MacGyver assists Latino protesters against vineyard owners. MacGyver appears to have a strong connection with children, filling the role of "big brother" at the series' inception. MacGyver demonstrates his allegiance to children by assisting a mountain excursion for delinquent youths. MacGyver also conducts hearing research at a school for deaf children.

In regard to the environment, MacGyver strives to protect endangered species such as eagles, the black rhino, and wolves. At an unspecified date during the series, MacGyver begins practicing vegetarianism.

MacGyver is persistent and spontaneous. He employs improvisation to evade anticipatory countermeasures, and his plans are difficult to thwart on account of their unpredictability. This constant spontaneity challenges MacGyver as well as his adversaries. Because MacGyver continues to operate in this manner, it is assumed the tactical advantage of spontaneity outweighs its disadvantages. This is observed by MacGyver's nemesis Murdoc.

MacGyver demonstrates mood congruence, exhibiting grief in tragedy, fear in peril, and pain in suffering. This stands in contrast to exaggeratedly macho or stoic action heroes. MacGyver is introspective, and takes responsibility for personal losses and tragedies. He experiences guilt when duty prevents him from attending his mother's death and funeral. He experiences depression when his best friend suffers a fatal climbing accident.

MacGyver's most-used item is his Swiss Army knife. He usually carries a roll of duct tape in his back pocket, flattened out to make it fit. Other items he often has on hand are: an ID card, a Timex Camper watch, strike-anywhere matches, a few paper clips, chewing gum, and a flashlight. He also has a toolbox in his Jeep. MacGyver initially used a Jeep Cherokee and then a Jeep Wrangler beginning with Season 2, but in Season 5 he began driving his grandfather Harry's "classic" 1946 Chevrolet pickup truck.

MacGyver is proficient in Russian, German, French, Italian, Spanish, and American Sign Language, and knows how to use International maritime signal flags and Morse code. He is an avid outdoorsman with skills that include skiing and outdoor survival. Despite an acute fear of heights, he is skilled at mountain/rock climbing, hang gliding, and parachuting - static line, ripcord and high-altitude military parachuting. His other hobbies include ice hockey and racing, and he has shown interest in painting and guitar.

His haircut is a mullet, in a clean-cut, lightly gelled variation on the classic hairstyle.

While never being in a long-term on-screen relationship, he has relationships with several women in individual episodes and several past long-term relationships are mentioned, from which he has one child. He is on good terms with his past romantic acquaintances.

=== First name ===
MacGyver's first name was originally intended to be Stacey, as seen in a press release from Paramount. However, it was never confirmed in any episode, and remained a mystery until the seventh season. Whenever he is asked about it, he says he dislikes his first name and quickly changes the subject. His grandfather, Harry Jackson, calls him "Bud" or "Buddy". Most of his friends and colleagues call him by his last name MacGyver or simply "Mac".

In the final season, his first name is revealed to be Angus when, while knocked unconscious and hallucinating, he meets a 7th-century man named Ian M'Iver ("son of Ingmarr") whose son has the same first name. This revelation is repeated in the series finale, which introduces MacGyver's son as having the middle name Angus, as well as on the packaging of the MacGyver DVD season sets.

=== Biography ===
MacGyver's birthdate is first seen as January 23, 1951 but was then revised in season 2 as March 23, 1952, the date which continued to be used for the rest of the series. However, in Series 6 Episode 12 Jerico Games, he looks at a 1968 high school yearbook when he was supposedly 18. He was raised in Mission City, Minnesota. MacGyver was in the Cub Scouts. A Den Mother by the name of Mrs. Fryfogel taught him "backwoods common sense" and the motto "Be prepared."

At the age of 7, his grandmother Celia Jackson and father James MacGyver (Martin Milner) were killed in a car accident in which they both drowned, and MacGyver grew up with his mother, Ellen MacGyver. His grandfather, Harry Jackson (John Anderson) acted as his father, but moved away when MacGyver was 16, working for a time in Alaska while sending money to MacGyver and his mother, and eventually settled down as a farmer in Minnesota.

At about 12 years of age, MacGyver had a traumatic experience of the accidental shooting death of a friend by a bullet from a falling gun. MacGyver is a lifelong player of ice hockey, having played in his local hockey leagues and coached for a minor league team. He is a supporter of the Calgary Flames and believed he could have made the NHL. He met Jack Dalton while in high school.

MacGyver went to Western Tech where he graduated with a dual degree in chemistry and physics. After graduating from college he turned down an offer to work at the nearby nuclear power plant and it is later revealed that he briefly served during the Vietnam War in a bomb-defusing team. Five years before the start of the series, MacGyver worked as a "Hell Fighter," fighting oil well fires in Sumatra, Indonesia. Sometime during this time MacGyver's mother died of a stroke while he was in Afghanistan on assignment, though no specifics are given other than its being after Christmas. Eventually he moved to Los Angeles where he held numerous jobs until he accidentally meets Peter Thornton, an agent at the Department of External Services (DXS). When MacGyver saves Thornton's life using a paper clip, a wrench and shoelaces, MacGyver is offered a job as a field agent at the DXS.

In the first episode of Season 2, Thornton takes a job as Director of Operations at the Phoenix Foundation, and MacGyver follows, where he is hired as a "sort of troubleshooter." He is assigned to a variety of tasks, usually field operations such as conducting environmental surveys and testing security systems. In the fifth season, Harry dies of a heart attack, at which point MacGyver believes he has no remaining relatives.

In the second to last episode of the show, it is revealed that MacGyver has a son, Sean "Sam" Angus Malloy. Sean's mother is the photojournalist Kate Malloy who MacGyver had met after college. Kate had been murdered in China several years prior to MacGyver's meeting their son for the first time. After discovering and reuniting with Sean, MacGyver decides to resign from the Foundation in order to spend time with his son.

Two television specials featuring the character followed, both occurring and released in 1994, two years after the series ended. In the first one (MacGyver: Lost Treasure of Atlantis), MacGyver teams up with his former college archaeology instructor, Professor Atticus (Brian Blessed), to help him prove his theories about ancient Atlantis while dodging the bullets of genocidal Yugoslav troops, a Greek revolutionary and a ruthless treasure hunter. Soon thereafter (MacGyver: Trail to Doomsday), he investigates the murder of a friend in Britain, and eventually traces it to an unscrupulous businessman who sells nuclear arms research for profit. No mention in either special is made of Pete Thornton, Jack Dalton, MacGyver's son Sean or any of the show's other regulars.

=== Family ===
- Harry Jackson (John Anderson) – MacGyver's maternal grandfather. Harry is introduced in season 1. Harry usually calls MacGyver "Bud", and MacGyver refers to him as "Harry", but why is never revealed until the episode "Phoenix Under Siege". Harry had cut ties with Mac and his mom, and was living a life of solitude until MacGyver came to him while trying to keep a low profile due to a bounty on his head. After this they kept in regular contact, with Harry appearing in several more episodes until he dies of a heart attack in the fifth season. MacGyver's grandmother was mentioned several times but never portrayed in the series, though her name was revealed to be Celia.
- James (Martin Milner) and Ellen MacGyver (Shelia Moore) – MacGyver's parents. Both of MacGyver's parents are deceased before the series begins. James MacGyver died, along with MacGyver's grandmother, when their car went off the road and they drowned in a creek when MacGyver was 7. His mother, Ellen died from a stroke the day after an unspecified Christmas, but Mac was not able to make it home to see her. James appears in two episodes. Ellen appears in one.
- Sean "Sam" Angus Malloy (Dalton James) – MacGyver's first son. Sean is the son of MacGyver and photojournalist Kate Malloy, who had a relationship after college before the series began. Unknown to MacGyver until several years after Kate's death, he fathered a child with Malloy, Sean. Sean appears in only one episode.

=== Cultural impact ===
The term "MacGyver" has now become part of the colloquial lexicon of American English and the anglospherical general vernacular. When one "MacGyvers" a solution to a problem, one finds a simple yet elegant solution using existing resources. This is in contrast to a kludge, which has a meaning relatively close to "MacGyver" but generally considered more insulting, or with the implication that it's prone to fail or very temporary; or a Rube Goldberg, which is a solution that's overly complicated. The term is even used in Stargate: SG-1, when Amanda Tapping explains something to Richard Dean Anderson.

== MacGyver (2016–2021 series) ==
Angus MacGyver
- Lucas Till as MacGyver
- First appearance: "The Rising"
- Last appearance: "Abduction + Memory + Time + Fireworks + Dispersal"
- Created by: Lee David Zlotoff
- Portrayed by: Lucas Till
- Developed by: Peter M. Lenkov

In-universe information
- Occupation: Secret agent
- Family: Ellen Hayes (mother); James MacGyver (father)
- Relatives: Harry Jackson (grandfather); Gwendolyn Hayes (aunt)
- Nationality: American

Lucas Till portrays a younger version of Angus "Mac" MacGyver in the 2016 reboot of the series.

=== Personality and skills ===
MacGyver has a genius-level intellect and a particular ability for adaptation and improvisation. He is a resourceful U.S. operative who works for the Phoenix Foundation, a covert U.S. government agency operating under the guise of a think tank. Trained as an EOD technician for the Army, Mac prefers to use non-lethal means to stop his enemies, and refuses to carry a gun, though if necessary he will resort to lethal measures. He is never without his trusty Swiss Army knife and uses anything in his environment to his advantage. While not an expert in biology or medicine, MacGyver is shown to be an efficient field medic and knowledgeable in crime scene techniques and DNA sequencing procedures.

He is afraid of heights, though is able to overcome his fear to finish his missions. Though not an expert fighter, he is shown to be able to temporarily hold off multiple enemies in hand-to-hand combat, typically long enough for him to figure out a way to end the conflict using his adaptation and improvisational skills. He is proficient in multiple languages, including Italian, German and Mandarin. He also knows Morse code.

He is shown to be charming, personable, and with an easy ability to make and keep friends. MacGyver shows flashes of intense anger when his friends are threatened or when his father, who disappeared from MacGyver's life at the age of 10, is mentioned.

=== Biography ===
MacGyver was raised primarily in Mission City, California. His mother died when MacGyver was 5, and his father disappeared from MacGyver's life when MacGyver was 10. After his father's disappearance, MacGyver was raised by his grandfather. MacGyver met his best friend Wilt Bozer in the fifth grade, and both graduated from Mission City High School. Bozer and MacGyver are roommates when the series begins, although Bozer initially believes that MacGyver works as an IT expert.

MacGyver spent two years at MIT studying physics, though did not graduate. He left MIT to join the Army because he wanted to make an actual difference in people's lives rather than thinking about theoretical problems, being trained as an EOD technician and spending three years in Afghanistan. In the Army he met Jack Dalton, who was a Delta Force soldier.

After leaving the Army, MacGyver was hired by the Department of External Services, a government clandestine operation using the guise of a think tank. Eventually, Jack Dalton left his position with the CIA and became MacGyver's partner at DXS; by the time of the series pilot, they had spent three years as partners at DXS. After DXS's original, unnamed cover is blown a new cover is needed which will allow for a transition of the organization's assets so its work can continue. MacGyver suggests the name "Phoenix", after the mythological bird that is reborn by rising from its own ashes, and the organization begins using the cover-name of the "Phoenix Foundation".
