= MacGyver (2016 TV series) season 3 =

MacGyver
- Season 3
- Promotional poster for the season
- Showrunners: Peter M. Lenkov; Craig O'Neill
- Starring: Lucas Till; Tristin Mays; George Eads; Justin Hires; Meredith Eaton
- No. of episodes: 22

Release
- Original network: CBS
- Original release: September 28, 2018 – May 10, 2019

Season chronology
- ← Previous; Season 2 Next → Season 4

The third season of the CBS action-adventure series MacGyver premiered on September 28, 2018 for the 2018–19 television season. The series centers on the fictional Phoenix Foundation which is a covert organization masquerading as a think tank. The series stars Lucas Till, George Eads, Tristin Mays, and Justin Hires. Eads departed in "Father + Bride + Betrayal". CBS announced the series on April 28, 2018 for a twenty-two episode third season. The season premiere, "Improvise", brought in 5.77 million viewers.

== Cast and characters ==
=== Main ===
- Lucas Till as Angus "Mac" MacGyver
- George Eads as Jack Dalton
- Tristin Mays as Riley Davis
- Justin Hires as Wilt Bozer
- Meredith Eaton as Matilda "Matty" Webber

=== Recurring ===
- William Baldwin as Elwood Davis
- Tate Donovan as James MacGyver/"Oversight"
- Reign Edwards as Leanna Martin
- Levy Tran as Desiree "Desi" Nguyen

=== Guest stars ===
- Peter Weller as Elliot Mason/Bad MacGyver
- Chad Michael Collins as Lt. Robert Reese; MacGyver's friend
- Presilah Nunez as ATF Agent Maria Ramirez with ATF K-9; MacGyver's friend
- Michael Des Barres as Nicholas Helman
- Brendan Hines as Ethan Raines; Matty's Husband
- Lance Gross as Billy Colton
- Sheryl Lee Ralph as Mama Colton
- David Dastmalchian as Dennis Murdoc
- David Bianchi as Oscar
- Mo Gallini as Daris

== Episodes ==
The number in the "No. overall" column refers to the episode's number within the overall series, whereas the number in the "No. in season" column refers to the episode's number within this particular season. "U.S. viewers (millions)" refers to the number of viewers in the U.S. in millions who watched the episode as it was aired.

No. overall	No. in season	Title	Directed by	Written by	Original release date	Prod. code	U.S. viewers (millions)
45	1	"Improvise"	Stephen Herek	Peter M. Lenkov & Craig O'Neill	September 28, 2018	MAC301	5.77
With Mac having happily taken on a new life helping a village in Nigeria, he is met by his father, who tells him Jack is in trouble. Video has surfaced of Jack working with the former leader of Belarus, whom he helped to depose and who is now trying to assemble an army to reclaim his position. With help from Bozer, Leanna, and Riley, Mac and his father are able to locate Jack, only to see him captured by the current leader of Belarus. Following a successful mission, Matty tells James MacGyver that the Phoenix Foundation really needs his son and convinces him to make a greater effort towards reconciliation with his son. Meanwhile, Jill has been heading up an investigation into locating Murdoc and is later killed by him.
46	2	"Bravo Lead + Loyalty + Friendship"	Duane Clark	Brian Durkin	October 5, 2018	MAC302	5.73
Mac officially rejoins the Phoenix team and asks to head up the attempt to capture Murdoc. He soon finds himself helping Jack and his old Delta Force team rescue a fellow member, who is on the run in Honduras after being falsely accused of terrorism. Elsewhere, Matty assigns Leanna, Riley, and Bozer to pilfer the cell phone from a criminal liaison who is in L.A., knowing that the phone will be loaded with contacts from the criminal underworld.
47	3	"Bozer + Booze + Back to School"	Tessa Blake	Nancy Kiu	October 12, 2018	MAC303	6.16
Matty has Mac, Bozer, Riley, and Leanna pose as college transfer students to find out who is recruiting students at Western Tech University to unwittingly assist in terrorist operations using new transparent bomb technology. Meanwhile, Jack takes Riley's place providing backup for Billy Colton as he tries to collar a bail jumper, but things don't go so well.
48	4	"Guts + Fuel + Hope"	Peter Weller	Rob Pearlstein	October 19, 2018	MAC304	6.01
While Jack is being debriefed by the CIA for his role in Belarus and Leanna is on another assignment, Mac and Riley are left to help a tankerful of liquid oxygen make it to a children's hospital in the Adjara region of southwest Georgia. Complicating the mission are rebel forces blocking the roads and criminals who want to steal the valuable contents of the tanker. Meanwhile, Riley tries to convince Mac to accept his father's lunch invitation.
49	5	"Dia de Muertos + Sicarios + Family"	Eagle Egilsson	Jim Adler & Andrew Karlsruher	October 26, 2018	MAC305	5.90
Mac and Jack return to Mexico with James to try and capture cartel kingpin Luis Gomez, with the ultimate goal of getting Gomez to reveal the location of James' rogue former partner, Walsh. After capturing Gomez and making preparations to get him out of the country, a cop whose family member was killed by Gomez shoots and kills him in revenge. Elsewhere, Bozer and Riley pose as a suburban couple who have just moved in across the street from Daniel Kettner, a man who is suspected of selling U.S. secrets to China.
50	6	"Murdoc + MacGyver + Murdoc"	Stephen Herek	Craig O'Neill	November 2, 2018	MAC306	6.06
Murdoc forces Mac to help locate his son, Cassian, while revealing he has kidnapped Mac's girlfriend Nasha and is holding her as collateral. Murdoc states his ex-wife, Amber, has escaped from a Serbian prison and is now trying to get her son back. As they track leads to find Cassian in Colombia, Jack and Bozer work to locate the spot where Nasha is being held. Amber double-crosses Murdoc and escapes with millions of dollars but, by that time, Mac has rescued Cassian and arrested Murdoc. Murdoc agrees to return to federal prison in exchange for The Phoenix placing Cassian in a protected home.
51	7	"Scavengers + Hard Drive + Dragonfly"	Gabriel Beristain	Andrew Karlsruher	November 9, 2018	MAC307	6.43
After a prominent Senator gets a ransom request over a compromising photo on his old laptop, he comes to Matty for help, knowing that there is an even more critical file on the computer regarding the top-secret "Project Dragonfly." Matty sends Mac, Jack, Bozer, and Riley on a "needle in a haystack" mission in Ghana to locate the computer's hard drive in a massive electronics landfill. There, they encounter a 16-year-old girl who works for a ruthless man in an operation that recovers anything valuable from the landfill's contents. After a successful mission, Matty is shown privately viewing a video file on the recovered hard drive. The video shows her husband, Ethan Reigns, announcing that he's about to begin a deep undercover assignment for the CIA on August 7, 2010.
52	8	"Revenge + Catacombs + Le Fantome"	Lily Mariye	Brian Durkin	November 16, 2018	MAC308	6.20
Matty has intelligence that the Ghost Bomber is back and is plotting a major attack. She tasks Mac, Riley, and Bozer with locating and capturing the elusive criminal and they are later joined by British intelligence officer Eileen Brennan (Holland Roden). Brennan claims to have a personal interest in capturing the Ghost, stating he killed her parents, but Mac later discovers that Brennan is Irish and is the Ghost's daughter.
53	9	"Specimen 234 + PAPR + Outbreak"	Mike Martinez	Lindsey Allen	November 30, 2018	MAC309	6.28
Matty orders Mac, Jack, and Bozer to track the disappearance of a deadly virus from the Centers for Disease Control in Atlanta. The chase leads the team to Romania, where a man named Dr. Luka is planning to use the virus to avenge the death of his brother in a mining accident. Elsewhere, Billy takes Riley on a road trip. After encountering a car thief along the way, the trip ends in a surprise for Riley.
54	10	"Matty + Ethan + Fidelity"	David Straiton	Andrew Karlsruher	December 7, 2018	MAC310	6.36
Matty reveals the shocking secret that her husband has been undercover in a criminal organization for eight years; when his status as a CIA agent comes out, Matty needs MacGyver to find and extract her husband before it's too late. The team travels to Cyprus, where Ethan is working undercover for a terrorist organization called S Company. After a successful mission, the team learns that Ethan has a new wife and a young daughter, which he gained to keep his cover. Matty later tells Ethan to go back to his wife and child, stating that they both need him.
55	11	"Mac + Fallout + Jack"	Carlos Bernard	Jim Adler	January 4, 2019	MAC311	6.42
Mac and Jack's mini-vacation is cut short when Griggs, from Mac's first mission as a part of DXS, abducts them and locks them in a concrete room as revenge for leaving him and another agent during a mission gone wrong in Jakarta. Mac fakes Jack's death to reveal Griggs' identity and knocks him out. Meanwhile, Matty tasks Riley, Bozer, and Leanna with stealing a diamond encoded with terrorist intelligence from a princess in Milan. Bozer asks Leanna to move into a new apartment with him, marking the next stage in their relationship.
56	12	"Fence + Suitcase + Americium-241"	Ron Underwood	Brian Durkin	January 11, 2019	MAC312	6.58
Riley is tasked with pretending to be master thief Charlotte Cole to catch "The Fence," an underworld criminal. The Fence has Riley steal a dirty bomb hidden in a brief case from Silverwall in Moscow. Matty threatens the real Charlotte to help them stop the bomb from getting in The Fence's hands, in return for not telling her family about her crimes. Aided by Charlotte, the Phoenix team infiltrates Silverwall and finds the bomb. Mac determines that the bomb is made of Americium 241 and defuses it with Charlotte's help. Charlotte double-crosses Mac, handcuffing him to the table and fleeing with the suitcase. The team finds the plane on which Charlotte will return to Los Angeles to give the case to The Fence. To stop this, Riley intercepts the exchange. But since Riley was initially pretending to be Charlotte, this forces The Fence to hesitate when they are held at gunpoint. The Fence reveals that he has Charlotte's family in captivity to determine the real Charlotte Cole. With Riley about to be shot, Mac saves her with a flaming tire trick.
57	13	"Wilderness + Training + Survival"	Brad Turner	Joshua Brown & Andrew Klein	January 18, 2019	MAC313	6.90
Having taken Bozer and Riley to the Washington state wilderness for a survival training session, Mac is captured by a group of criminals. While Riley and Bozer work to locate Mac without the aid of technology, Mac stays alive by assuring the thieves he can locate their stolen crate of cash that was washed away by a storm. Elsewhere, Matty and Jack receive credible evidence that the people Ethan double-crossed while undercover have located him and his family. The two thwart an attack and help Ethan and his family relocate again but, in the process, Ethan's wife Deena learns about his history with Matty. Matty assures Deena that Ethan's life is with her and their child, saying she will not attempt to win him back.
58	14	"Father + Bride + Betrayal"	Avi Youabian	Story by : Sophia Lopez; Teleplay by : Lindsey Allen & Nancy Kiu	February 1, 2019	MAC314	6.96
Alonzo Olvera, an international black market arms dealer, offers to turn himself in and provide Matty with details of his operation if she will give him safe entry into the United States to walk his only daughter down the aisle on her wedding day. Matty agrees, but has Mac, Jack, Riley, and Bozer pose as wedding guests to make sure Alonzo doesn't try to escape. Armed thugs, thought to be irate arms customers of Alonzo's, storm the wedding reception. After they are captured, Alonzo is found to have been killed via cyanide injection. Mac deduces that a wedding guest, someone very close to Alonzo, is behind the attack. After a successful capture of the perpetrator, Jack tells the group that he is leaving on an open-ended mission to take down international terrorist Tiberius Kovac, who was thought to be killed in an explosion years ago but is very much alive.
59	15	"K9 + Smugglers + New Recruit"	Gabriel Beristain	Rob Pearlstein	February 15, 2019	MAC315	6.38
After a surprising introduction to Phoenix's newest recruit, Desi, MacGyver and team are assigned to protect a gun-sniffing dog who has a bounty on its head. During a confrontation with loud gunfire, the dog runs away. Now, the team must find him before someone collects the bounty. They find the dog, but not before he and his trainer are taken by the men who put out the bounty. Fortunately, the people who put out the bounty don't want to kill the dog, but rather use him and his trainer to find the holes in their operation. This buys time for Mac, Desi, and the team to rescue them.
60	16	"Lidar + Rogues + Duty"	Stephen Herek	Don Perez	February 22, 2019	MAC316	6.57
The Phoenix must recover the body of a pilot whose plane crashed while testing an experimental laser mapping system that MacGyver designed. It turns out that the pilot is alive, with minor injuries, turning the mission into a search and rescue. Mac and Desi are able to find the pilot and escape local authorities, then locate and arrest the person who sabotaged the pilot's plane. Back home, Riley tries to identify the hacker who tricked a SWAT team into arresting her and Elwood in Riley's home. Matty and Riley discover that it wasn't just Riley's personal information that was compromised, but everyone's at the Phoenix, with the exception of Desi. Now, they must find out who leaked their files, and why, before it's too late.
61	17	"Seeds + Permafrost + Feather"	Alexandra La Roche	Nancy Kiu and Lindsey Allen	March 15, 2019	MAC317	5.62
Mac, Riley, and Desi head to Greenland, where a man working in a highly secure international seed vault has vanished without a trace. Upon arrival, the team finds a dead body and one packet of seeds missing from a North Korean crate, the seeds being for a pea pod whose plant can be synthesized into a deadly poison. Suspecting a terror plot, the team ultimately locates the escapee, Arthur, only to learn he has a revenge motive instead. At home, Mac has Bozer and Leanna tail his father, suspecting he is hiding something. Mac later finds his dad in a hospital, receiving cancer treatments.
62	18	"Murdoc + Helman + Hit"	Roderick Davis	Lee David Zlotoff	April 5, 2019	MAC318	5.57
Phoenix learns of a hit that is apparently the work of Nicholas Helman, presumed to have been previously killed by Murdoc. After discovering that Helman has been hired to kill members of a Hong Kong cartel that were planning to turn state's evidence, the team goes to the Phoenix black site to seek Murdoc's help in locating his former mentor. The cartel hits are discovered to be a plot conceived by Murdoc himself, who used his son's visits to breach the black site's security system and lure Helman to him. In a scuffle between Murdoc, Bozer, and Helman, both Bozer and Helman are shot while Murdoc escapes. However, Murdoc is later captured by Mac and his father. As additional punishment, Murdoc is forced to share an adjoining cell with Helman, who survived the shooting, as did Bozer.
63	19	"Friends + Enemies + Border"	Andi Armaganian	Justin Lisson	April 12, 2019	MAC319	6.08
Out of contact with the Phoenix due to their cell phones being lost in a scuffle in Bosnia, Mac and Desi happen upon a truck that has fallen into a sinkhole, trapping a family and a badly injured border guard. While helping the family get out of danger, Mac learns they are Syrian and the border guard was shot by a rogue group trying to keep Syrians out of the country. Back in Los Angeles, Bozer is thrilled that Mac's father is letting him drive his new company vehicle with all the bells and whistles. But, upon pressing the brake to start the vehicle, Bozer realizes he's triggered a bomb that will go off if he releases the brake. Riley eventually disables the bomb by hacking into the vehicle's CAN bus, but now Phoenix must try to figure out who wants Oversight killed.
64	20	"No-Go + High-Voltage + Rescue"	Eagle Egillson	Rob Pearlstein & Andrew Karlsruher	April 26, 2019	MAC320	5.54
Upon learning of the disappearance of a young couple in Bogotá, James sends Mac, Desi, Riley, and Bozer to find them after the state department refuses to help due to the couple's participation in dangerous and illegal 'No-go' challenges. After completing one of the challenges, things take a turn when the team realizes human traffickers have been using the No-go challenges to prey on the participants. Meanwhile, after upgrading Sparky the Robot with emotion analysis software, Bozer and Riley discover Mac and Desi are attracted to one another, making Bozer worry about his best friend.
65	21	"Treason + Heartbreak + Gum"	Stephen Herek	Nancy Kiu & Lindsey Allen	May 3, 2019	MAC322	5.33
After Matty's ex-husband, Ethan, reaches out to her to help him save his wife and daughter from his old boss, she goes off the grid to steal a classified list of operatives as a ransom payment, resulting in Ethan kidnapping the director of the CIA. Mac, Desi, and Bozer also go off the grid to help locate Ethan's family before the ransom is made, but they only manage to locate Ethan's wife, not his daughter. They are able to stall for time when James appears and helps them take down the criminal leader responsible, saving Ethan's daughter. However, due to his actions against the CIA, Ethan goes to prison for treason. Meanwhile, Riley travels to Paris to help Billy and Mama Colton capture two international fugitives for their roles in terrorist activities. However, Riley discovers Billy has been cheating on her. While the mission was a success, she breaks up with Billy, as she cannot trust him anymore.
66	22	"Mason + Cable + Choices"	Maja Vrvilo	Jim Adler	May 10, 2019	MAC321	5.47
A sophisticated bomb draws in the Phoenix team and a bomb squad, and leads to Mac's old friend Charlie being held in a booby-trapped elevator. The device is found to be the work of Elliot Mason (Peter Weller), a former military special operations officer who has gone rogue. Mac does all he can to disable the booby trap, but Mason has anticipated his moves and offers Mac a choice: save his friend or allow a hundred innocent people to die from another bomb he has set. Charlie sacrifices himself to let Mac off the hook, after which Mason reveals a grudge he holds against James MacGyver for ordering an extraction mission that caused the death of Mason's son. As a result, he says he will continue to torment Angus MacGyver by forcing him to make painful choices. James then admits to his son that he did order the extraction mission, which was done to save Angus himself.

== Production ==
=== Development ===
Title card for the second and third seasons.

On April 18, 2018, CBS renewed MacGyver for a third season. When CBS announced its fall schedule it was revealed that the series would keep its timeslot of Fridays at 8 pm (ET). The season premiered on September 28, 2018, and is expected to contain twenty-two episodes.

=== Filming ===
The series continues to be produced in Atlanta, Georgia, filming at Mailing Avenue Stageworks in Chosewood Park.

=== Casting ===
The season features five starring roles, all five of which returned from the first season. Isabel Lucas is the only main cast member not to return from the second season following her departure in "CO2 Sensor + Tree Branch". In addition, George Eads departed the series in the fourteenth episode. Levy Tran was cast in a recurring role as Desiree Nguyen to replace Eads.

== Reception ==
=== Critical reception ===
Rotten Tomatoes, a review aggregator website gives the series a user rating of 3.4 out of 5 based on twenty-seven reviews.

=== Ratings ===
Viewership and ratings per episode of MacGyver (2016 TV series) season 3
No.	Title	Air date	Rating/share (18–49)	Viewers (millions)	DVR (18–49)	DVR viewers (millions)	Total (18–49)	Total viewers (millions)
1	"Improvise"	September 28, 2018	0.7/3	5.77	0.4	1.82	1.1	7.59
2	"Bravo Lead + Loyalty + Friendship"	October 5, 2018	0.7/3	5.73	0.3	1.60	1.0	7.33
3	"Bozer + Booze + Back to School"	October 12, 2018	0.8/4	6.16	0.3	1.54	1.1	7.70
4	"Guts + Fuel + Hope"	October 19, 2018	0.7/3	6.01	0.4	1.57	1.1	7.58
5	"Dia de Muertos + Sicarios + Family"	October 26, 2018	0.6/3	5.90	0.4	1.66	1.0	7.55
6	"Murdoc + MacGyver + Murdoc"	November 2, 2018	0.8/3	6.06	0.3	1.41	1.1	7.47
7	"Scavengers + Hard Drive + Dragonfly"	November 9, 2018	0.7/3	6.43	0.4	1.50	1.1	7.94
8	"Revenge + Catacombs + Le Fantome"	November 16, 2018	0.7/3	6.20	0.4	1.60	1.1	7.80
9	"Specimen 234 + PAPR + Outbreak"	November 30, 2018	0.7/3	6.28	0.4	1.49	1.1	7.77
10	"Matty + Ethan + Fidelity"	December 7, 2018	0.7/3	6.36	—N/a	1.61	—N/a	7.97
11	"Mac + Fallout + Jack"	January 4, 2019	0.7/3	6.42	0.4	1.65	1.1	8.07
12	"Fence + Suitcase + Americium-241"	January 11, 2019	0.7/4	6.58	0.4	1.62	1.1	8.19
13	"Wilderness + Training + Survival"	January 18, 2019	0.8/4	6.90	—N/a	1.58	—N/a	8.48
14	"Father + Bride + Betrayal"	February 1, 2019	0.8/4	6.96	0.4	1.67	1.2	8.64
15	"K-9 + Smugglers + New Recruit"	February 15, 2019	0.7/4	6.38	—N/a	1.62	—N/a	8.00
16	"Ligar + Rogues + Duty"	February 22, 2019	0.8/4	6.57	—N/a	1.53	—N/a	8.11
17	"Seeds + Permafrost + Feather"	March 15, 2019	0.6/3	5.62	—N/a	1.66	—N/a	7.29
18	"Murdoc + Helman + Hit"	April 5, 2019	0.6/3	5.57	0.4	1.74	1.0	7.31
19	"Friends + Enemies + Border"	April 12, 2019	0.7/4	6.08	0.3	1.44	1.0	7.52
20	"No-Go + High-Voltage + Rescue"	April 26, 2019	0.6/4	5.54	—N/a	1.47	—N/a	7.01
21	"Treason + Heartbreak + Gum"	May 3, 2019	0.6/4	5.33	—N/a	1.51	—N/a	6.84
22	"Mason + Cable + Choices"	May 10, 2019	0.6/4	5.47	—N/a	1.59	—N/a	7.06
