= MacGyver (2016 TV series) season 4 =

MacGyver
- Season 4
- Promotional poster for the season
- Showrunners: Peter M. Lenkov; Terry Matalas
- Starring: Lucas Till; Tristin Mays; Justin Hires; Meredith Eaton; Levy Tran; Henry Ian Cusick
- No. of episodes: 13

Release
- Original network: CBS
- Original release: February 7 – May 8, 2020

Season chronology
- ← Previous; Season 3 Next → Season 5

The fourth season of the CBS action-adventure series MacGyver premiered on February 7, 2020, as a mid-season replacement for the 2019–20 television season. CBS renewed the series for a fourth season in May 2019. The season contained thirteen episodes and concluded on May 8, 2020. The series continues to center on the fictional Phoenix Foundation which is a covert organization masquerading as a think tank. It stars Lucas Till, Tristin Mays, Justin Hires, Meredith Eaton, Levy Tran and Henry Ian Cusick.

The season premiere, "Fire + Ashes + Legacy = Phoenix", was watched by 5.94 million viewers, while the season finale, "Save + The + Dam + World", was watched by 5.77 million viewers. The most watched episode of the season was the eighth episode of the season, "Father + Son + Father + Matriarch", with 7.07 million viewers.

== Cast and characters ==
=== Main ===
- Lucas Till as Angus "Mac" MacGyver
- Tristin Mays as Riley Davis
- Justin Hires as Wilt Bozer
- Meredith Eaton as Matilda "Matty" Webber
- Levy Tran as Desiree "Desi" Nguyen
- Henry Ian Cusick as Russell "Russ/Rusty" Taylor

=== Recurring ===
- Leonardo Nam as Aubrey
- Tate Donovan as James "Jimmy" MacGyver/Oversight
- Jeri Ryan as Gwendolyn "Gwen" Hayes
- Amber Skye Noyes as Scarlett

=== Guest stars ===
- Joshua Leonard as Martin Bishop
- Xander Berkeley as General John Acosta
- Emmanuelle Vaugier as Major Anne Frost
- Amanda Schull as Emilia West
- James Murray as Maître d’
- Sal Vulcano as Chef Salvatore
- Joe Gatto as Larry
- Brian Quinn as Dale
- Keith David as Burke
- John Ales as Nikola Tesla
- Scottie Thompson as Ellen MacGyver
- Zach McGowan as Roman
- Tobin Bell as Leland

== Episodes ==
The number in the "No. overall" column refers to the episode's number within the overall series, whereas the number in the "No. in season" column refers to the episode's number within this particular season. "U.S. viewers (millions)" refers to the number of viewers in the U.S. in millions who watched the episode as it was aired.

| No. overall | No. in season | Title | Directed by | Written by | Original release date | Prod. code | U.S. viewers (millions) |
|---|---|---|---|---|---|---|---|
| 67 | 1 | "Fire + Ashes + Legacy = Phoenix" | David Straiton | Terry Matalas | February 7, 2020 | MAC402 | 5.94 |
Ex MI6 agent-turned-private military contractor Russ Taylor recruits former Phoenix Foundation members Mac, Riley, Bozer, Matty, and Desi to hunt down a bioweapon that will likely be used for a devastating attack on a major U.S. city. The man in charge of the weapon, Martin Bishop, reveals a mysterious organization that is planning multiple catastrophes to get the attention of world leaders. Bishop then kills himself with a poison pill. After Mac and the team successfully stop the weapon from doing any damage, Taylor proposes rebooting the Phoenix Foundation as a privately funded entity.
| 68 | 2 | "Red Cell + Quantum + Cold + Committed" | David Straiton | Terry Matalas | February 14, 2020 | MAC401 | 5.77 |
Department of Defense General John Acosta recruits MacGyver to steal a highly classified project from a military lab in order to find the flaws in its security. But when it's discovered that the general is planning an attack using the weapon, the team must stop Acosta before the weapon is uploaded while also trying to rescue the general's kidnapped daughter and grandson. When the two are rescued, the kidnapper kills himself after revealing his association with Martin Bishop's group. Meanwhile, Riley expresses concern about Mac and Desi's breakup, citing that the group has this "Phoenix Curse" about relationships. In reality, Riley already has another boyfriend that no one knows about except Matty.
| 69 | 3 | "Kid + Plane + Cable + Truck" | Lily Mariye | Rob Pearlstein | February 21, 2020 | MAC403 | 5.83 |
While aboard their jet, MacGyver and the team discover a private plane in which the pilot, flying with his young son, has suffered a heart attack. Mac and Desi board the plane mid-flight and discover that the medical emergency was perpetrated. During the rescue, Russ and Matty disagree over who has the ultimate authority to make critical judgment calls during an active operation. Russ later agrees that Matty is more qualified to do so.
| 70 | 4 | "Windmill + Acetone + Celluloid + Firing Pin" | Eagle Egilsson | Andrew Karlsruher | February 28, 2020 | MAC404 | 5.57 |
When a building explodes in a village in Germany, Mac discovers the cause was a defective time-release bomb from World War II. Mac finds another bomb that hasn't been detonated yet, so he and Riley try to extract it without setting it off. Meanwhile, Desi works to save one of the victims in the rubble while Russ is concerned about Bozer's role on the team. Mac finally finds out that Riley is dating someone. He also hints at his feelings for Riley. They later find out that the mysterious organization was established in the 1940s under the name "CODEX."
| 71 | 5 | "Soccer + Desi + Merchant + Titan" | Duane Clark | Cindy Appel | March 6, 2020 | MAC405 | 5.65 |
The team finally plays offense against CODEX by planning to take down their source of income, "The Merchant," who rigs women's soccer games in Milan, Italy. Desi goes undercover as a member of the soccer team and The Merchant takes the bait, asking her to throw the game. The team finds out that The Merchant is going to have a meeting with the leader of CODEX, "Titan." Russ wants to get to Titan, but things go bad when The Merchant plants an electronic chip in Desi that will electrocute her if she fails to intentionally miss a penalty kick. Mac devises a way to save Desi while the rest of the team tries to catch The Merchant and Titan. They save Desi, but The Merchant and Titan escape. In the end, they are shocked to learn that Titan appears to be Matty.
| 72 | 6 | "Right + Wrong + Both + Neither" | Roderick Davis | Andrew Klein | March 13, 2020 | MAC406 | 5.84 |
The team determines that Matty is not "Titan" and learns that CODEX hacked their servers to plant the fake evidence. While on a plane, Russ listens to a voicemail from his former love, Emilia, who asks him for help. He learns that Emilia was kidnapped by the same Eastern European rebels he fought during his military contract days. He then takes the Phoenix team to a small, impoverished town just across the Ukrainian border to rescue Emilia and rid the town of the rebels for good. In the end, the team saves Emilia and shuts down the rebels' illegal operation before Russ pays the rebels to leave the town.
| 73 | 7 | "Mac + Desi + Riley + Aubrey" | Brad Turner | Stephanie Hicks | March 27, 2020 | MAC407 | 6.72 |
Mac and Desi witness the murder of the restaurant owner by Chinese Triad hitmen, while on a double date with Riley and her boyfriend Aubrey. The hitmen kidnap Riley and Aubrey due to a $2 million debt, as Aubrey confesses to Riley that he co-owns the restaurant. After Aubrey sees his accounts have been emptied, Riley says she can use her hacking skills to locate the money. In the end, Aubrey breaks up with Riley over her dishonesty about her job, so she moves in with Mac. Meanwhile, Matty visits James MacGyver in his hospital room to tell him about the CODEX situation. He tells her to look up something called File 47, which he describes as "the end of the world."
| 74 | 8 | "Father + Son + Father + Matriarch" | David Straiton | Travis Fickett | April 3, 2020 | MAC408 | 7.07 |
When Mason resurfaces, Mac and his father must put aside their feud and catch him once and for all, but they soon realize it was set up by CODEX, forcing all three to work together to escape. They get caught by CODEX and finally meet "Titan," who turns out to be Mac's aunt, Gwendolyn "Gwen" Hayes, a former DXS Agent thought to have been killed. She explains that the state of the world has forced scientists to "play God" and wipe out one-quarter of the earth's population to preserve its long-term future. She tries to persuade Mac to join her but fails. Mason and James make a plan to destroy the place after Mac is safe, but James is forced to manually trigger the blast and is presumed dead. Mac survives alongside Mason, who then flees again. Meanwhile, The Phoenix is ambushed by the CIA, who found out Matty was inquiring about File 47. After thwarting the CIA, Matty finally tells the team about File 47, stating that all who worked on it were presumed dead except one: Gwen.
| 75 | 9 | "Code + Artemis + Nuclear + N3mesis" | Michael Martinez | Brandon Botta & Casey Tollett Botta | April 10, 2020 | MAC409 | 6.38 |
When Los Angeles County has a blackout, Riley discovers that "N3MESIS," an old code developed by her and two of her hacker friends, Kai and Peyton, is being used to hack a nuclear power plant. Riley tracks down Peyton to get the master key. Riley is able to reboot the power plant computers but, during the reboot, someone takes over the computers and starts a sequence to trigger a meltdown. While Mac and the team devise a contraption to provide core cooling and buy time, Riley and Desi locate Kai, who was caught on video hacking the county power grid. Kai says she was paid by someone, who turns out to be Peyton, having orchestrated the attack to expose weaknesses in the plant's security. Although they save the city from a meltdown, Mac is forced to sacrifice the power plant supervisor's life while he was trying to close down the nitrogen tubes manually. Riley visits Kai in prison and thanks her for helping take down Peyton. Mac and Russ watch a video that James MacGyver left in case of his death. He gives them a string of numbers, after which the USB drive and laptop self-destruct.
| 76 | 10 | "Tesla + Bell + Edison + Mac" | Yangzon Brauen | Rob Pearlstein | April 17, 2020 | MAC410 | 6.44 |
The team learns that the secret code James left leads to the address of a remote home where Nikola Tesla himself was building a superweapon. When CODEX ambushes them at the old house, it causes Mac to lose his short-term memory. Mac undergoes a dangerous memory treatment, transporting him back to a house in the 1920s where he encounters an old school bully, the power plant supervisor who was sacrificed (from the previous episode), Thomas Alva Edison, Alexander Graham Bell, his mother Ellen (whom he learns supported File 47), and even his evil self before he meets Tesla to get the answers his memory lost. Meanwhile, Russ, Desi, and Riley work without Mac to find the superweapon before CODEX does. They find it in an abandoned mine and learn that it's a type of electromagnetic ray gun. A recovered Mac gets on the phone with the team and helps them arm and use the weapon, which thwarts all the CODEX soldiers except Scarlett, who escapes. The episode closes with Desi making dinner for Mac in his home, as Mac looks at a window and sees his evil self smiling back at him.
| 77 | 11 | "Psy-Op + Cell + Merchant + Birds" | Ericson Core | Story by : Stephanie Hicks & Andrew Klein; Teleplay by : Cindy Appel & Andrew Karlsruher | April 24, 2020 | MAC411 | 6.19 |
Having captured The Merchant in China, The Phoenix drugs him and brings him back to L.A., where Russ concocts an elaborate simulation to make The Merchant think he's in a Chinese prison with Mac for a cellmate. Pretending that Aunt Gwen convinced him to join CODEX, Mac tries to get The Merchant to reveal the location of their bunker. However, The Merchant figures out the simulation and gets a coded message out to CODEX, who plans to storm the building. After a bloody battle, The Merchant is taken away in a car, but it's revealed his captors are Russ and Bozer. Russ reveals they intercepted CODEX earlier and the battle The Merchant witnessed was staged. Riley realizes that she likes Mac, which Bozer knows. Mac later visits the imprisoned Merchant and asks how he almost believed in Mac's commitment to join CODEX. The Merchant says Mac sounded truly conflicted about his ideals.
| 78 | 12 | "Loyalty + Family + Rogue + Hellfire" | Geoff Shotz | Jim Adler | May 1, 2020 | MAC412 | 5.89 |
Russ questions Mac's loyalties when bio-feedback reveals he wasn't lying in his conversations with The Merchant. Mac insists he was playing a role, but Desi is also suspicious. Russ and Matty visit the White House to enlist military support to stop CODEX for good. Mac vehemently disagrees with a planned missile strike, knowing there are children and innocent people on the CODEX compound after conversations with Gwen. Gwen also revealed that Mac's mother did not die of cancer, but was murdered by the U.S. government. Mac goes rogue, certain that the best way to stop CODEX is to join them and convince them there are other ways to achieve their goals. He takes Scarlett out of custody to help him enter the compound and they are later joined by Riley. The three obtain Tesla's Shiva weapon on the way and use it to thwart the incoming missile. Gwen welcomes Mac and Riley into CODEX.
| 79 | 13 | "Save + The + Dam + World" | Carlos Bernard | Story by : Terry Matalas; Teleplay by : Cindy Appel | May 8, 2020 | MAC413 | 5.77 |
At the CODEX underground compound, Mac meets with Gwen's boss Leland. Mac and Riley are then given a transport assignment and, though they are kept in the dark about the group's plans, Mac deduces they have some kind of nuclear device. Along the way, they are confronted by Russ and Desi at gunpoint. Mac is able to convince them he's still on their side, but the meeting is captured by a CODEX camera. Leland shows the footage to Gwen and states that Mac and Riley will be killed when they get to their fake destination, along with members of Gwen's team. Mac is able to convince Gwen to help him save the world. Mac figures out that the nuke will be used to trigger the massive volcano that rests under Yellowstone National Park by blowing up a dam and forcing water down a thousand-mile drilled passage. He concludes that they can't keep the bomb from exploding, but he can disable the nuclear reaction. Unfortunately, his timing device is destroyed in a scuffle, so Gwen volunteers to trigger Mac's device manually, sacrificing herself. Reunited with The Phoenix, Mac arranges a Senate hearing wherein he presents his mother's climate change research.

== Production ==
=== Development ===
On May 9, 2019, CBS renewed MacGyver for a fourth season, with Terry Matalas replacing Craig O'Neill as co-showrunner alongside Peter M. Lenkov. It was later revealed that the season would premiere on February 7, 2020, after being pushed to mid-season to make room for Magnum P.I. on CBS' Friday schedule. On November 6, 2019, it was revealed that CBS had ordered nine additional episodes which would’ve brought the season order to twenty-two episodes. However, on March 14, 2020, it was announced that production on the fourth season had been shut down due to the COVID-19 pandemic. As a result, CBS later decided to save some of the remaining episodes for season 5 and end season 4 after episode thirteen.

=== Casting ===
On May 9, 2019, it was announced that Levy Tran, who plays Desi Nguyen, was expected to be promoted to series regular for the season, after recurring during the previous season. On June 7, 2019, it was officially confirmed that Tran would be promoted to series regular. On June 28, 2019, it was announced that Henry Ian Cusick had been cast as a series regular in the role of Russ. On February 18, 2020, it was announced that Jorge Garcia would guest-star in an episode as Jerry Ortega, his character from Hawaii Five-0, however, his appearance was later delayed until season 5. On February 20, 2020, it was revealed that Jeri Ryan has been cast in a recurring role as MacGyver's aunt Gwen. All four members of the comedy troupe The Tenderloins (James Murray, Sal Vulcano, Joe Gatto, and Brian Quinn) guest-starred in episode seven as restaurant employees. Tate Donovan and Peter Weller both reprised their roles from previous seasons as James MacGyver and Elliot Mason, respectively.

=== Lenkov's termination ===
Following the conclusion of the season, Lenkov was fired from both MacGyver and Magnum P.I., on July 7, 2020, following allegations that he created a toxic work environment. Lenkov had also been the showrunner of Hawaii Five-0, which concluded in April 2020, three months before his firing. He was replaced by Monica Macer for season five. In response the Lenkov's firing, series star Lucas Till said that Lenkov's actions caused him to feel suicidal and that Lenkov bullied, verbally abused, and body-shamed him, which a spokesperson for Lenkov claimed was not true.

== Viewing figures ==
Viewership and ratings per episode of MacGyver (2016 TV series) season 4
| No. | Title | Air date | Rating (18–49) | Viewers (millions) | DVR (18–49) | DVR viewers (millions) | Total (18–49) | Total viewers (millions) |
|---|---|---|---|---|---|---|---|---|
| 1 | "Fire + Ashes + Legacy = Phoenix" | February 7, 2020 | 0.7 | 5.94 | 0.3 | 1.55 | 0.9 | 7.49 |
| 2 | "Red Cell + Quantum + Cold + Committed" | February 14, 2020 | 0.7 | 5.77 | —N/a | 1.51 | —N/a | 7.29 |
| 3 | "Kid + Plane + Cable + Truck" | February 21, 2020 | 0.6 | 5.83 | —N/a | 1.39 | —N/a | 7.23 |
| 4 | "Windmill + Acetone + Celluloid + Firing Pin" | February 28, 2020 | 0.6 | 5.57 | —N/a | 1.43 | —N/a | 7.05 |
| 5 | "Soccer + Desi + Merchant + Titan" | March 6, 2020 | 0.6 | 5.65 | —N/a | 1.30 | —N/a | 6.95 |
| 6 | "Right + Wrong + Both + Neither" | March 13, 2020 | 0.7 | 5.84 | —N/a | 1.46 | —N/a | 7.30 |
| 7 | "Mac + Desi + Riley + Aubrey" | March 27, 2020 | 0.8 | 6.72 | —N/a | 1.34 | —N/a | 8.06 |
| 8 | "Father + Son + Father + Matriarch" | April 3, 2020 | 0.8 | 7.07 | —N/a | 1.35 | —N/a | 8.42 |
| 9 | "Code + Artemis + Nuclear + N3mesis" | April 10, 2020 | 0.7 | 6.38 | 0.3 | 1.47 | 1.0 | 7.85 |
| 10 | "Tesla + Bell + Edison + Mac" | April 17, 2020 | 0.7 | 6.44 | 0.3 | 1.51 | 1.0 | 7.95 |
| 11 | "Psy-Op + Cell + Merchant + Birds" | April 24, 2020 | 0.7 | 6.19 | —N/a | 1.30 | —N/a | 7.50 |
| 12 | "Loyalty + Family + Rogue + Hellfire" | May 1, 2020 | 0.6 | 5.89 | 0.3 | 1.34 | 0.9 | 7.23 |
| 13 | "Save + The + Dam + World" | May 8, 2020 | 0.6 | 5.77 | 0.3 | 1.39 | 0.9 | 7.16 |
