= Bob Zellner =

American civil rights activist (born 1939)

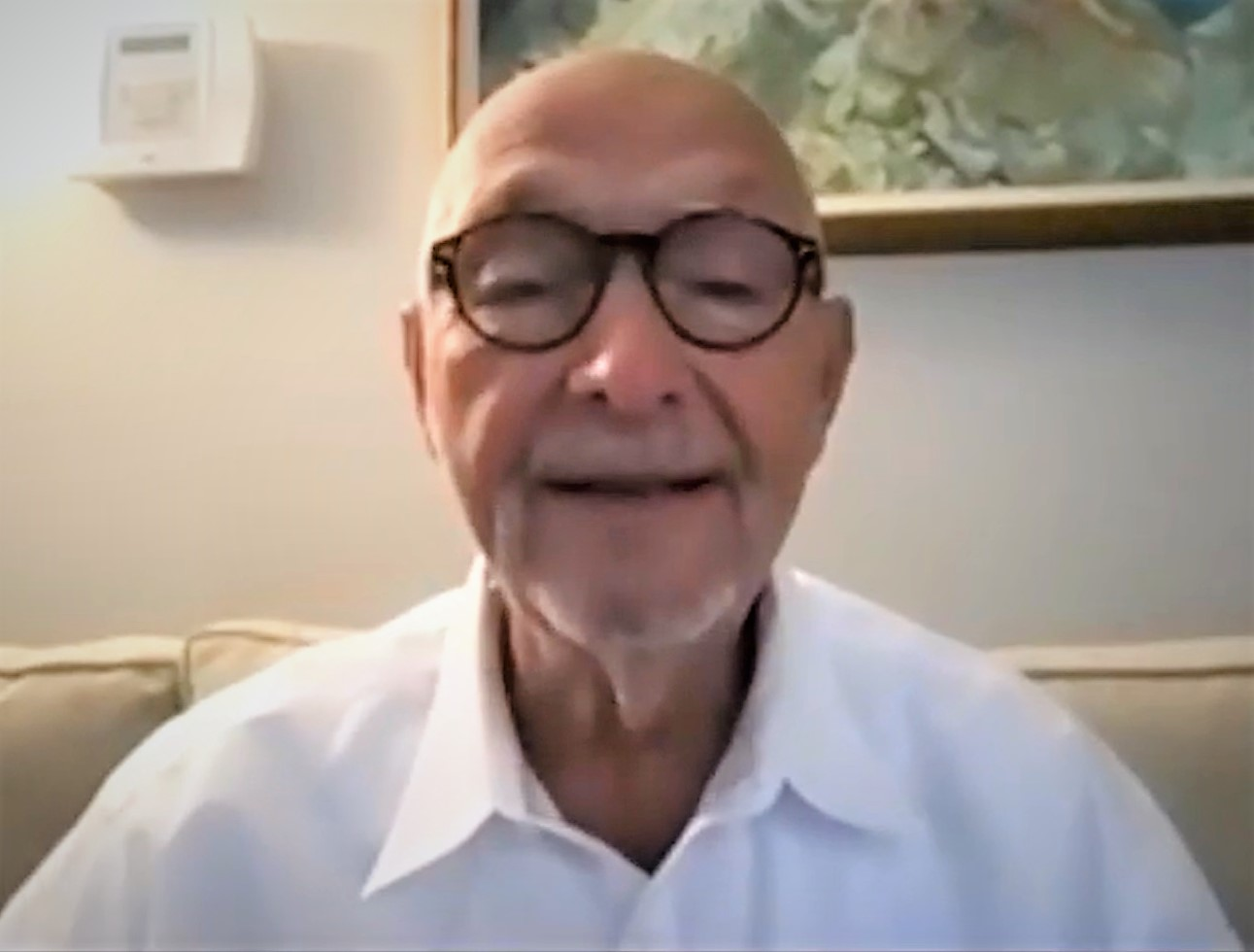
- Zellner interviewed by Green Left in 2021
- Born: April 5, 1939 (age 87); Jay, Florida, U.S.
- Education: Huntingdon College (B.A., 1961); Tulane University (PhD, 1993)
- Known for: Civil rights activism
- Spouses: Dorothy Zellner (m. 1962, divorced): Linda Miller

John Robert Zellner (born April 5, 1939) is an American civil rights activist. He graduated from Huntingdon College in 1961 and that year became a member of the Student Nonviolent Coordinating Committee (SNCC) as its first white field secretary. Zellner was involved in numerous civil rights efforts, including nonviolence workshops at Talladega College, protests for integration in Danville, Virginia, and organizing Freedom Schools in Greenwood, Mississippi, in 1964. He also investigated the murders of Chaney, Goodman, and Schwerner that summer.

Zellner was arrested and severely beaten for his activism several times. He left SNCC in 1967 but continued his civil rights activism. He later taught the history of the civil rights movement at Long Island University and published a memoir of his activism that was adapted into the 2020 film Son of the South, with Lucas Till portraying him. Zellner was arrested as recently as 2013, for protesting a North Carolina voter ID law.

== Early life and education ==
John Robert Zellner was born to James Abraham Zellner and Ruby Hardy Zellner on April 5, 1939, in Jay, Florida. (Note: Some sources state that he was born in Alabama, He grew up in Alabama, the second oldest of five children. but Zellner's autobiography states that he was born in Jay, Florida.) He was named after his godfather and the officiant at his parents' wedding, Bob Jones Sr. His relatives were involved in the Ku Klux Klan (KKK) and his father and grandfather were members. Zellner's father organized for the white supremacist group but eventually left the Klan after supporting Jewish resistance in Nazi dominated eastern Europe during the 1930s, prior to World War II. A pivotal experience was traveling through Russia with a Black gospel group while evangelizing. After James left the KKK, Zellner's grandparents disowned their son. James then became a minister in the Methodist Church. James was one of the few preachers in the South who supported the civil rights movement and many churches refused to allow him to preach over his views on integration.

Zellner was educated at W. S. Neal High School in Brewton, Alabama, and Murphy High School where he graduated in 1957. He attended Huntingdon College, which was at the time an all-white school. While a senior there he researched "solutions to racial problems in the South" as a sociology assignment. For the paper Zellner and four others wanted to interview civil rights activists Martin Luther King Jr. and Ralph Abernathy. They told their professor they planned to visit King and Abernathy at the Montgomery Improvement Association (MIA). He responded by suggesting they visit the library or conduct field research through the KKK or white citizens' council, and told the five it "won't be necessary" to study multiple points of view in the issue of race. The five disregarded his instructions and discussed civil rights with students at the Alabama State College for Negroes and visited the MIA's offices. The group ended up interviewing King, Rosa Parks, and E. D. Nixon, catalyzing Zellner's interest in the civil rights movement. The white community did not approve, and Zellner had crosses burned outside his dorm by the KKK, the school suggested his expulsion, and the Attorney General of Alabama accused him of communism. Zellner's interest in the movement grew, and he helped Freedom Riders who were under attack by white supremacists in May 1961. Zellner graduated from Huntingdon with a degree in psychology and sociology later that year. Zellner later studied for a summer at the Highlander Folk School and two years at Brandeis University but did not graduate.

Through his meetings over civil rights Zellner had been introduced to the Student Nonviolent Coordinating Committee (SNCC), a student-led civil rights organization. He was contacted by Anne Braden and soon hired to "conduct outreach to whites", becoming a formal volunteer on September 11, 1961. He was SNCC's first and, for the first year he worked, only white field secretary.

== Civil rights work ==
As a civil rights activist, Zellner was beaten unconscious several times, leading to brain damage and post-traumatic stress disorder. He was severely beaten by white men after protesting the murder of Herbert Lee, as well as the expulsion of Brenda Travis and Ike Lewis from Burglund High School. Police officers and Federal Bureau of Investigation agents watched the beating occur. Zellner was briefly involved in running a high school for students who had dropped out of Burglund in protest. He was arrested on December 10, 1961, during the Albany Movement when he sat in an integrated group on a train. Hundreds protested the arrest, including almost three hundred who marched while they were on trial.

In 1962 Zellner and Chuck McDew visited Dion Diamond, an imprisoned Freedom Rider in Baton Rouge, Louisiana. The two were arrested, held for a month, and charged with criminal anarchy. Zellner was arrested again in January 1963 at Huntingdon College on charges of vagrancy, which was later changed to false pretenses. He was defended against a possible ten-year sentence by Clifford Durr and Charles Morgan Jr., and acquitted. After the Children's March in Birmingham, Alabama, in 1963 turned violent, Zellner and other activists went to the city. He attended the March on Washington for Jobs and Freedom in 1963. Zellner was involved in nonviolence workshops at Talladega College, protests for integration in Danville, Virginia, and organizing Freedom Schools in Greenwood, Mississippi, in 1964 during the Freedom Summer, when he became close friends with Stokely Carmichael. He also investigated the murders of Chaney, Goodman, and Schwerner with Rita Schwerner. Also that year he was the co-director of the Southern Student Organizing Committee. In about 1964, Zellner took a two-year break from his civil rights activism to study towards earning a Master's in sociology at Brandeis. He did not graduate and returned to SNCC, where he was one of just seven active white members.

He left SNCC in 1966 after the group expelled all white members, and moved to the Southern Conference Educational Fund. Zellner appealed SNCC's decision in 1967 as he presented a project to organize white workers in Mississippi, but was denied re-entry. He continued his project without their support, moving with his wife, Dorothy Zellner, to the Gulf Coast and establishing the Grass-Roots Organizing Workers (GROW; also known as Get Rid of [George] Wallace). The couple also created the Deep South Education and Research Center. Their project consisted of organizing pulpwood workers to advocate for higher wages. A strike beginning in September 1971 was successful after three months. During the civil rights movement, Zellner was arrested many times, with one source counting 25 arrests by the summer of 1963. In the 1970s he lectured at the National Institute for Minorities in China (now Minzu University of China).

From 1991 to 1993 he worked to earn a PhD from Tulane University in history, writing a dissertation on the civil rights movement. That year he was hired to teach about the civil rights movement at Long Island University. Zellner published Wrong Side of Murder Creek: A White Southerner in the Freedom Movement in 2008. After moving to Wilson, North Carolina, Zellner was arrested in 2013 protesting a North Carolina voter ID law.

== Legacy ==
An oral history based on interviews with Zellner is included in the 2006 book Generation on Fire: Voices of Protest from the 1960s by Jeff Kisseloff. Zellner later described his involvement with SNCC as "the greatest thing that ever happened in my life."

Zellner published a memoir, The Wrong Side of Murder Creek, in 2011. The memoir inspired the 2020 film Son of the South, in which he was portrayed by Lucas Till.

== Personal life ==
Zellner has been married twice, first to Dorothy Zellner (from August 9, 1963) and later to Linda Miller.

== Bibliography ==
- Brown, Sarah Hart (2000). Standing Against Dragons: Three Southern Lawyers in an Era of Fear. LSU Press. ISBN 978-0-8071-4019-2.
- Lewis, Andrew B. (2009). The Shadows of Youth: The Remarkable Journey of the Civil Rights Generation. Farrar, Straus and Giroux. ISBN 978-1-4299-3574-6.
- Marshall, James P. (2013). Student Activism and Civil Rights in Mississippi: Protest Politics and the Struggle for Racial Justice, 1960–1965. LSU Press. ISBN 978-0-8071-4984-3.
- Zellner, Bob; Curry, Constance (2008). The Wrong Side of Murder Creek: A White Southerner in the Freedom Movement. Montgomery, AL: NewSouth Books. ISBN 978-1-58838-222-1.
