= Son of the South (film) =

2020 American biographical historical drama film

- Official film poster
- Directed by: Barry Alexander Brown
- Screenplay by: Barry Alexander Brown
- Based on: The Wrong Side of Murder Creek by Bob Zellner
- Produced by: Colin Bates; Stan Erdreich; Bill Black; Eve Pomerance
- Starring: Lucas Till; Lex Scott Davis; Lucy Hale; Jake Abel; Shamier Anderson; Julia Ormond; Brian Dennehy; Cedric the Entertainer
- Cinematography: John Rosario
- Edited by: Barry Alexander Brown
- Music by: Steven Argila
- Production companies: Lucidity Entertainment; Major Motion Pictures; River Bend Pictures; El Ride Productions; SSS Film Capital
- Distributed by: Clear Horizon Entertainment; Vertical Entertainment
- Release dates: August 26, 2020 (ABFF); February 5, 2021 (United States)
- Running time: 105 minutes
- Country: United States
- Language: English
- Budget: $5.5 million
- Box office: $48,582

Son of the South is a 2020 American biographical historical drama film, written and directed by Barry Alexander Brown. Based on Bob Zellner's 2011 autobiography, The Wrong Side of Murder Creek: A White Southerner in the Freedom Movement, Lucas Till portrays Zellner, with Lex Scott Davis, Lucy Hale, Jake Abel, Shamier Anderson, Julia Ormond, Cedric the Entertainer and Brian Dennehy appearing in supporting roles. Spike Lee serves as an executive producer.

It had its world premiere at the American Black Film Festival on August 26, 2020. It was released on February 5, 2021, by Clear Horizon Entertainment and Vertical Entertainment, receiving mixed reviews from critics, however praising Till's performance.

== Plot ==
The film opens on April 5, 1961, and focuses on Bob Zellner, who is the son of a Methodist minister, a senior attending all-White Huntingdon College in Montgomery, Alabama. Seeking information with which to write research papers on race relations, Zellner and four fellow students attend an event held in a Baptist Black church to mark the fifth anniversary of the 1955–1956 Montgomery bus boycott. The event is conducted by Ralph Abernathy and Rosa Parks. When the police arrive to arrest them, the White students evade arrest by fleeing through a back door. Dubbed the 'Huntingdon Five' in a newspaper, a cross is burned on the yard outside Zellner's room by the KKK. Zellner's klansman grandfather, J.O., warns him not to involve himself in the civil rights movement.

Witnessing an attack on the Freedom Riders on May 19, 1961, Zellner helps Jessica Mitford get to safety. At first a passive supporter of the movement, Zellner goes on to become SNCC's first White field secretary. Facing suspicion at first from black SNCC activists, he proves his bona fides by protesting alongside them, narrowly escaping a lynching by rural, white southerners while in McComb, Mississippi after a march to the county courthouse on October 30, 1961. Following the murder of Herbert Lee, Zellner decides to leave the movement and continue his studies in the North. After a violent confrontation with a former friend, who organized the attempted lynching, Zellner firmly changes course and then commits himself to the movement. The film ends with a montage of Zellner's civil rights activism during the 1960s, including a tribute to his mentor, the late John Lewis.

== Cast ==
- Lucas Till as Bob Zellner
- Lex Scott Davis as Joanne
- Lucy Hale as Carol Anne
- Jake Abel as Doc
- Shamier Anderson as Reggie
- Ludi Lin as Derek Ang
- Dexter Darden as John Lewis
- Sienna Guillory as Jessica Mitford
- Chaka Forman as Jim Forman
- Mike Manning as Townsend Ellis
- Julia Ormond as Virginia Durr
- Brian Dennehy as J.O. Zellner
- Cedric the Entertainer as Ralph Abernathy
- Sharonne Lainer as Rosa Parks
- Nicole Ansari-Cox as Professor Kleiner
- Matt William Knowles as Jim Zwerg
- Byron Herlong as James Zellner
- Onye Eme-Akwari as Charles McDew

== Production ==
=== Development and pre-production ===
In February 2019, it was announced Barry Alexander Brown would direct the film, from a screenplay he wrote, while Colin Bates, Eve Pomerance, Bill Black, and Stan Erdreich would serve as producers on the film, while Spike Lee, Frank Barwah, Steven Ray, and Christian D. Bruun will serve as executive producers. In April 2019, Lucas Till, Lucy Hale, Lex Scott Davis, Julia Ormond, Cedric the Entertainer, Mike Manning, Sharonne Lainer, Brian Dennehy, Chaka Forman, Shamier Anderson, Jake Abel, Ludi Lin, Onye Eme-Akwari, Dexter Darden, and Matt William Knowles joined the cast of the film.

=== Filming ===
Principal photography began in April 2019, in Montgomery, Alabama. Many outdoor scenes, including the attempted lynching scene, the creek scenes, the fishing pond, and the fields were filmed at the Riverview Plantation in nearby Montgomery County.

== Release ==
The film had its world premiere at the American Black Film Festival on August 26, 2020. Before that, Clear Horizon Entertainment acquired U.S. distribution rights to the film. On January 14, 2021, it was announced along with the release of the trailer, that Vertical Entertainment will co-distribute the film in the U.S. and release it in theaters and VOD on February 5.

== Reception ==
Son of the South received mixed reviews from critics. On review aggregator Rotten Tomatoes the film has a 59% rating based on reviews from 17 critics and an average rating of 5.7/10. On Metacritic, the film holds a rating of 60 out of 100, based on 4 critics, indicating "mixed or average reviews".

Despite the film's mixed critical reception, Till's performance received critical acclaim.

== See also ==
- Civil rights movement in popular culture
