= The Lost & Found Family =

- DVD Cover
- Directed by: Barnet Bain
- Written by: Terry Collis; Jeff Ross; Anna Waterhouse
- Produced by: Terry Collis; Bobbie Collis
- Starring: Ellen Bry; Lucas Till
- Cinematography: Brian Gunter
- Edited by: Ellen Goldwasser
- Music by: Nuno Malo
- Distributed by: Sony Pictures Home Entertainment
- Release date: September 15, 2009
- Running time: 91 minutes
- Country: United States
- Language: English

The Lost & Found Family is a 2009 direct-to-video Christian film starring Ellen Bry and Lucas Till. It was released on September 15, 2009 by Sony Pictures Home Entertainment. The film was directed by Barnet Bain.

== Plot ==
The story centers around a foster family made up of a group of misfits. Esther Hobbes (Ellen Bry) is left alone and widowed after her husband's death, but she learns to find peace within herself and use her faith and belief in the inherent good in all people to help those in need.

With nothing but the house her husband bought for her before he died, she decides to sell the home and move to Jackson, Georgia. The new house she moves to is home to five foster children: Crystal, the daughter of a drug addict (and named after crystal methamphetamine), Jasmine, a mute child with past trauma, Justin and Terry, two troubled teens, and Max, whose mother does not love him.

Through God and her growing relationships with the children, Esther begins to find courage to save the house. She soon discovers the house is a historical building, and with the help of the children and their parents they save the home. Esther then finds investors willing to fund her new goal of building more homes for foster children. At the end of the movie, Jasmine speaks to Esther after years of being silent, and tells her "Thank you."

== Cast ==
- Ellen Bry as Ester Hobbes
- Lynn Cole as Ramona
- Jeff Portell as Tony
- Lucas Till as Justin
- Reagan Lamb as Crystal
- Jessica Luza as Teri
- Micheal May as Max
- Erin Patterson as Jasmine
- Greg Thompson as Jon Garrett
- Justin Carpenter as Travis
- Teri Carpenter as Monica
- Della Cole as Doctor
- Bruce Taylor as Judge Washington
- Syvonne as Old Woman
- Ken Colquit as Probation Officer
- Cynthia Evans as Stephanie
- Bob King as Mr. White
- Stan Patterson as Cab Driver
- Dolan Wilson as Owner
- Tonya Stoneman as Deana
