= The personal is political =

Political slogan and argument of second-wave feminism

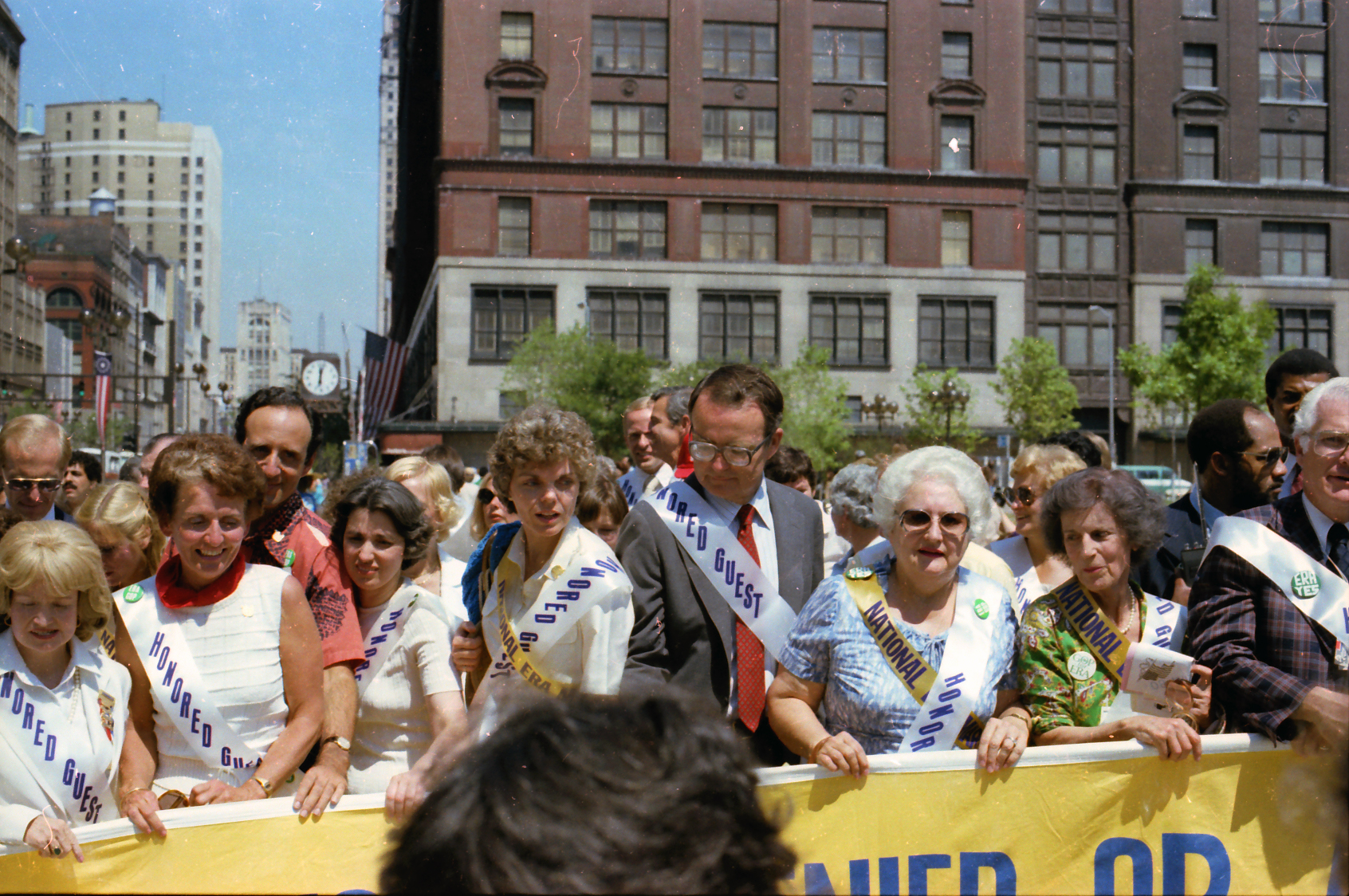
Photo from a pro-Equal Rights Amendment march in Detroit, Michigan, 1980, during the second wave of feminism. "The personal is political" was used as a popular slogan and rallying cry during these marches.

"The personal is political" is a political argument used as a rallying slogan by student activist movements and second-wave feminism from the late 1960s. In the feminist movement of the 1960s and 1970s, it was seen as a challenge to the patriarchy, nuclear family and family values. The phrase was popularized by the publication of feminist activist Carol Hanisch's 1969 essay, "The Personal Is Political." The phrase and idea have been repeatedly described as a defining characterization of second-wave feminism, radical feminism, women's studies, or feminism in general. It has also been used by some female artists as the underlying philosophy for their art practice.

== Origin and meaning ==
The phrase "the personal is political" was popularized by second-wave feminism in the late 1960s and was also important in the civil rights movement, student movement, and black power movement. It underscored the connections between personal experience and larger social and political structures. In the feminist movement of the 1960s and 1970s, it was a challenge to the nuclear family and family values that resulted from the embedded patriarchy structure. It forced popular social movements to challenge what was considered to be "political" and to reflect upon how lived experiences impact the perception of reality. Issues that had previously been considered moral or trivial offenses in everyday actions were being acknowledged as oppressive structural norms.

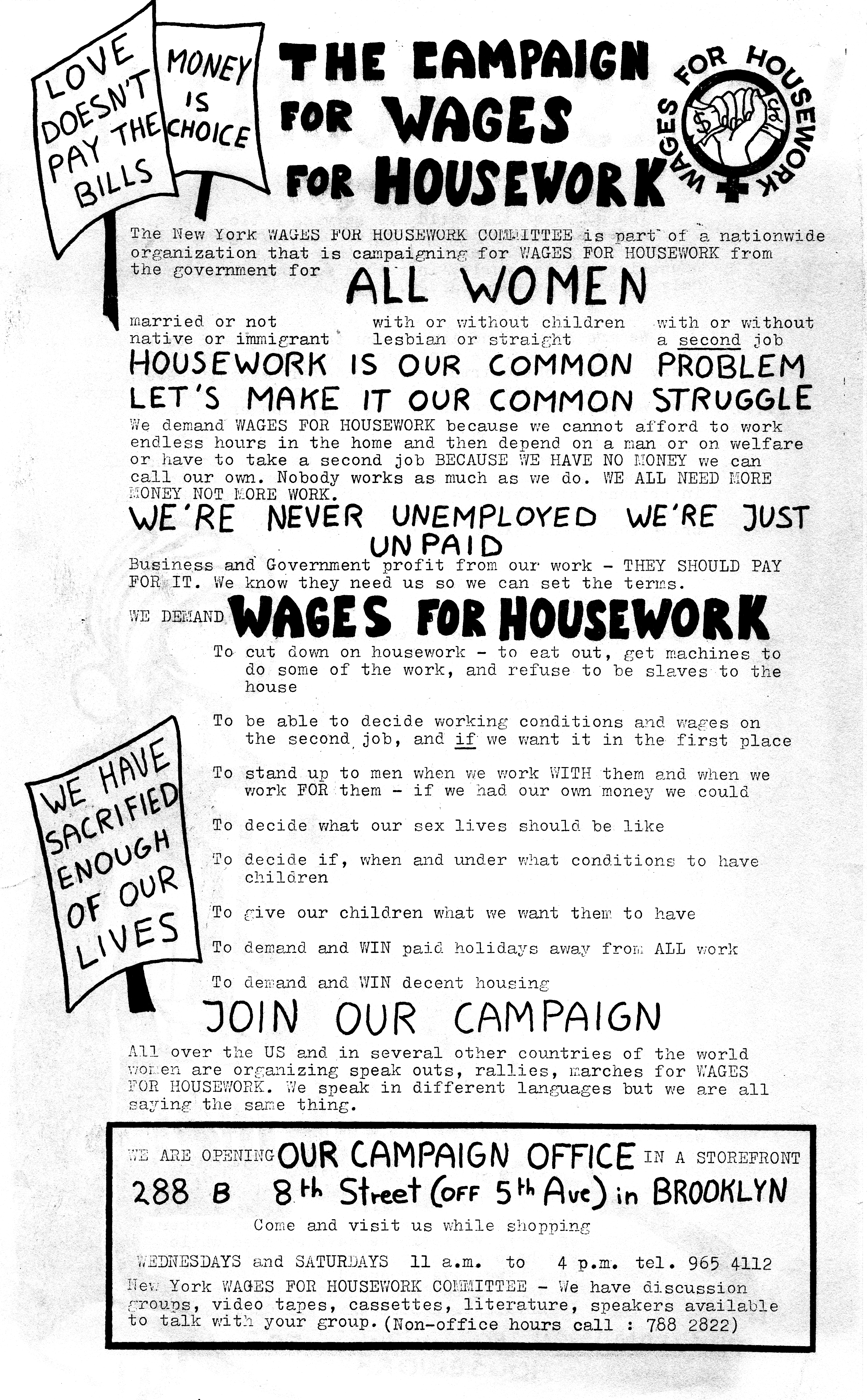
A flyer produced and distributed by the New York Wages for Housework Committee in 1974 that uses the framework of "the personal is political" to address women's unpaid domestic labor as "a common problem" requiring a "common struggle."

The idea that women were unhappy in their roles as housewives and mothers was previously seen as a private issue. However, "the personal is political" argues that women's personal issues (e.g. sex, childcare, and women not being content with their lives at home) are political issues that need political intervention to generate change. "The personal is political" drew attention to this relationship and resisted the claim that these issues are personal problems that should be solved in private and by the individual. This emphasized that politics were in play even in the most personal circumstances and relationships. Furthermore, the slogan tackles the perception that women enjoy a transcendent identity irrespective of ethnicity, race, class, culture, marital status, sexuality and disability by encouraging individuals to think about personal experience politically.

In 1970, the phrase was popularized by the publication of a 1969 essay by feminist Carol Hanisch under the title "The Personal Is Political". Hanisch disavows authorship of the phrase, saying that "As far as I know, that was done by Notes from the Second Year editors Shulie Firestone and Anne Koedt after Kathie Sarachild brought it to their attention as a possible paper to be printed in that early collection". According to Kerry Burch, Shulamith Firestone, Robin Morgan, and other feminists given credit for originating the phrase have also declined authorship. Burch writes, "Instead, they cite millions of women in public and private conversations as the phrase's collective authors." Gloria Steinem has likened claiming authorship of the phrase to claiming authorship of "World War II".

The phrase has been repeatedly described as a defining characterization of second-wave feminism, radical feminism, women's studies, or feminism in general.

== The Carol Hanisch essay ==
Carol Hanisch, a member of New York Radical Women and a prominent figure in the Women's Liberation Movement, drafted an article defending the political importance of consciousness-raising groups in February 1969 in Gainesville, Florida. Originally addressed to the women's caucus of the Southern Conference Educational Fund in response to a memo written by SCEF staffer Dorothy Zellner, the paper was first given the title, "Some Thoughts in Response to Dottie [Zellner]'s Thoughts on a Women's Liberation Movement". At the time Hanisch was a New York City-based staffer of the Fund and was advocating for engagement in dedicated organizing for women's liberation in the American South. Hanisch sought to rebut the idea that sex, appearance, abortion, childcare, and the division of household labor were merely personal issues without political importance. To confront these and other issues, she urged women to overcome self-blame, discuss their situations with each other, and organize collectively against male domination of society. In her essay, Hanisch's central argument is that women's "therapy" groups (later known as "consciousness-raising groups") should not be dismissed as "apolitical" or "navel-gazing" as some critics have argued but instead are deeply political as they address issues that affect the lives of women due to the organisation of the social system. She takes pains to highlight the fact that these issues should not be seen as problems caused by women's failures but rather by an oppressive system and should be treated as such, even though they may appear purely personal.

Hanisch does not herself use the phrase "the personal is political" in the essay, but writes:

One of the first things we discover in these groups is that personal problems are political problems. There are no personal solutions at this time. There is only collective action for a collective solution.

The essay was published under the title, "The Personal Is Political," in Notes from the Second Year: Women's Liberation in 1970. The essay's author believes that Shulamith Firestone and Anne Koedt, the book's editors, gave the essay its famous title. The essay has since been reprinted in Radical Feminism: A Documentary Reader.

== Multiple meanings ==
The phrase has adopted a number of meanings since first being coined in the 1960s. Hanisch herself observed in 2006 that "Like most of the theory created by the Pro-Woman Line radical feminists, these ideas have been revised or ripped off or even stood on their head and used against their original, radical intent." This highlights how feminists have interpreted the nature of the connection between the personal and political in divergent ways.

- The interpretation that arose in second-wave feminism is that the restriction of women to the private sphere is a political issue. The home is seen by some feminists as a site of oppression because women have had little choice but to adhere to the role of housewife and carry out domestic duties. These roles and norms expected of women (such as to be feminine; mothers; supportive wives) are acquired through the process of socialization. For example, young girls are often given babies and cooking sets as toys, which teaches them their role is to be a mother and carry out domestic duties. Likewise, the patriarchal structure is designed to embed the role of men in a similar fashion (i.e to be masculine, strong, independent, "bread winner"). Therefore, according to some feminists, the role of women at home and gender norms highlight the politicisation of the personal because it shows the consequences gender politics and the patriarchal structuring of society has had in women's lives.
- Private, female experiences are often shared. For example, abortion is an issue that has united women from all classes and backgrounds and so highlights that their personal experiences can be collective. Personal experiences shared between women arise from social conditions caused by patriarchy and gender politics. As summarized by Heidi Hartmann, "Women's discontent, radical feminists argued, is not the neurotic lament of the maladjusted but a response to a social structure in which women are systematically dominated, exploited, and oppressed." So to declare the private as political is thought to erode the boundaries between the two and avoid the oppression of women through ignorance of their common, therefore collective experiences.
- Believing politics only occurs in the public sphere excludes personal struggles and marginalises women. Politics is power that takes place in both the private and public sphere because issues that affect the private sphere (such as free contraception; equal pay) are also located in the public sphere. More simply, personal issues are affected by law making and enforcement. For example, the issue of domestic violence, occurring in the private sphere, was mostly excluded from the public political arena, such as the right to legal recourse or intervention. There was minimal legal protection for women, and domestic violence was considered as a waste of time for the police: “It is only in the last ten years that domestic violence has been taken seriously as a criminal justice issue. Before that, the vast majority of cases were brushed under the carpet with the refrain ‘it’s just a domestic’”. Former Director of Public Prosecutions (DPP), Keir Starmer (Starmer, 2011). Accordingly, this indicates that the personal and public (political) spheres are interdependent.
- This phrase asserts that women's personal issues need to be politicized for women to be emancipated from the patriarchy.

== Impact ==
The phrase has heavily figured in black feminism, such as "A Black Feminist Statement" by the Combahee River Collective, Audre Lorde's essay "The Master's Tools Will Never Dismantle the Master's House", and the anthology This Bridge Called My Back: Writings by Radical Women of Color, edited by Gloria E. Anzaldúa and Cherríe Moraga. More broadly, as Kimberlé Crenshaw observes: "This process of recognizing as social and systemic what was formerly perceived as isolated and individual has also characterized the identity politics of African Americans, other people of color, and gays and lesbians, among others." Black feminists expanded on the concept of "the personal is political" by dealing with the intersections of race, class and sex.

Other authors such as Betty Friedan (author of The Feminine Mystique) have also been seen to adapt the argument. Betty Friedan broke new ground as she explored the idea of women finding personal fulfilment outside of their traditionally seen roles. Friedan helped advance the women's rights movement as one of the founders of the National Organization for Women. Susan Oliver author of the biography Betty Friedan: The Personal Is Political, relies on the phrase in her attempt “to pull Friedan from the shadow of her most famous work and invites us to examine her personal life in order that we may better understand and appreciate 'the impact and influence' of her activities on the women's rights movement”.

The centrality of the "personal is political" to the second-wave feminist movement means that it is the impetus behind many policy and law changes, including the following in England:

- Legalisation of abortion (1967)
- Access to contraception on the NHS (1961)
- Access to contraception on the NHS regardless of marital status (1967)
- Criminalization of rape in marriage (1991, 2003)
- Married women property act revision (1964)

It also led to many non-state political action, including women's strikes, women's protests (including protests against Miss World 1970), Women's Liberation Movement (WLM) conferences, and the setting of women's refuges, rape crisis centres, and women's communes.

Both third-wave feminism and postfeminism hold the argument of "the personal is political" as central to their beliefs, "the second-wave' understanding of 'the personal is political' quickly evolved away from its explanatory and analytical power to become a prescription for feminism living—a shift that ultimately collapsed the terms together." Thus the concept continues to impact contemporary feminist discussion.

Third-wave feminists tend to focus on 'everyday feminism' for example, combining feminist values and statements with fashion, relationships and reclaiming traditionally feminised skills. Valuing these elements and openly declaring them to be political is considered to combine the person with the political, however this, like the meaning of the term, is contested. Some second-wave feminists believe that declaring all personal choices to be political, such as whether to wear nail polish, does not focus enough on how political structures shape "the personal". Other feminists argue that viewing the personal as political the way "everyday feminists" do does not necessarily mean ignoring how second-wave feminists used the term, and that both interpretations and applications are compatible.

== Art ==
Artists such as the Australian Ann Newmarch, founding member of the Women's Art Movement in Adelaide in 1976, used the philosophy to underpin her work, such as in her screenprint, Women Hold Up Half the Sky.

The Personal Is Political: Feminist Art from the Sara M. and Michelle Vance Waddell Collection was an exhibit in Cincinnati that showed how feminist artists connect their daily lives to the politics around their bodies. These artists used their creative expression to reveal connections between the personal and political realms of their lives.

Martha Wilson is a New York artist whose work reveals how her identity as a woman has been shaped by forces around her, like power relationships, culture and gender. Her work in the Portrait Society in 2009 made use of self portraits to explore how the personal is political.

== Use of technology ==
As argued by Frances Rogan and Shelley Budgeon in The Personal Is Political: Assessing Feminist Fundamentals in the Digital Age, technology has broken down the distinction between what is private and public even further. Private items, like smartphones, become products of connectivity and public communication. This technology can be seen as oppressive or as an opportunity for women. Social media grants a larger amount of visibility to women's experiences, which in turn can increase social surveillance, scrutiny and self-monitoring, and can be harmful.

They assert that at the same time, social media can act in a way that portrays women's bodies and appearance as signifiers of worth. Digital spaces like social media can give a user the ability to empower themselves through the platform. These platforms are also useful in bringing awareness to important gendered issues, and communicating experiences to a larger audience.

== Hashtag movements and personal narratives ==
On platforms such as Twitter and Instagram, personal stories often carry political weight. Li (2020), analyzed tweets and hashtags such as #MeToo and #WhyIDidntReport which shared intimate stories of sexual assault, which led directly into political discourse. Responses to these tweets called for activism and protests, rather than keeping the issue personal. Additionally, Lu (2023) adds that feminist campaigns on Instagram intensifies this effect because they use intense images and graphics to break the silence on taboo issues. Survivors posts become a “collective voice” that unifies experiences. Personal stories become means to ignite political discourse online. Ureta (2021), tells us that the “personal is political” has transcended individual cases to form a shared collective struggle with the #MeToo campaign.

== Criticisms ==
Liberal feminists argue that the phrase is dangerous because it erodes necessary political boundaries. This is because it is said to take away the importance of the public aspect of politics. It is further criticised by Hannah Arendt that, in this process of eroding political boundaries, the public space of politics is transformed into a pseudo-space of interaction in which individuals no longer 'act' but merely behave as economic producers and consumers.

Furthermore, according to some critics, the interpretation of the phrase to be about women being oppressed in the home has a very narrow focus on middle-class white women. This excludes women who work, lesbian couples, women who can not afford childcare and the experiences of other cultures.

The phrase "the personal is political" has given rise to cultural feminism, which many female activists see as a hindrance to political action and reform. It is argued that cultural feminism encourages activists to move away from politics and give in to traditional roles of the patriarchy.

Critics have also argued that the slogan has been inverted in contemporary usage. While its original second-wave meaning emphasised that shared personal experiences of oppression required collective political responses, later applications (particularly in third-wave and postfeminist contexts) have treated individual lifestyle choices as inherently political. Liza Featherstone has described this as a neoliberal perversion in which "the political is personal," reducing politics to individual moral performance and self-improvement at the expense of collective organising. Some second-wave feminists have rejected this everyday application of the slogan, arguing that it loses the original emphasis on collective action against structural inequalities.

Psychological and therapeutic interpretations of the slogan have also been criticised for depoliticising rather than politicising the personal. Celia Kitzinger argued that such approaches personalise political problems, focus on "revolution from within," and uncritically validate experience without analysing the social conditions that shape it.

In neoliberal contexts, the emphasis on personal experience has been criticised for turning lived experience into a form of capital that can reinforce existing hierarchies and selective empathy rather than challenge structural power.

== See also ==
- Identity politics
- Intersectionality
- Marxist feminism
- Social reproduction
- Wages for housework
- New York Radical Women, New York Radical Feminists, and Redstockings
