= The Collective (2023 film) =

American film by Tom DeNucci

- Theatrical release poster
- Directed by: Tom DeNucci
- Written by: Matt Rogers; Jason James
- Produced by: Jordan Yale Levine; Jordan Beckerman; Richard Switzer
- Starring: Lucas Till; Ruby Rose; Mercedes Varnado; Paul Ben-Victor; Tyrese Gibson; Don Johnson
- Cinematography: Alonso Homs
- Edited by: Thijs Bazelmans
- Music by: David Bateman
- Production company: Yale Productions
- Distributed by: Quiver Distribution
- Release date: August 4, 2023
- Running time: 86 minutes
- Country: United States
- Language: English

The Collective is an American action film written by Matt Rogers and Jason James, directed by Tom DeNucci and starring Lucas Till, Ruby Rose, Mercedes Varnado, Paul Ben-Victor, Tyrese Gibson and Don Johnson. It was released on August 4, 2023.

== Cast ==
- Lucas Till as Sam
- Ruby Rose as Daisy
- Don Johnson as Liam
- Mercedes Varnado as Nikita
- Tyrese Gibson as Hugo
- Paul Ben-Victor as Miro
- Michael Zuccocla as Christopher
- Eric Lutes as George

== Production ==
In December 2022, it was reported that Lucas Till, Ruby Rose, Tyrese Gibson and Don Johnson were cast in the film and that principal photography wrapped. The following month, Paul Ben-Victor and Mercedes Varnado were added to the cast.

== Release ==
In May 2023, it was announced that the North American distribution rights to the film were acquired by Quiver Distribution. The film was released in theaters, on digital and on demand on August 4, 2023.

== Reception ==
Jeffrey M. Anderson of Common Sense Media awarded the film two stars out of five.
