= MacGyver (2016 TV series) =

American action-adventure television series (2016–2021)

- Title card for the fourth and fifth seasons
- Genre: Action-adventure
- Based on: MacGyver by Lee David Zlotoff
- Developed by: Peter M. Lenkov
- Showrunners: Peter M. Lenkov; Craig O'Neill; Terry Matalas; Monica Macer
- Starring: Lucas Till; Tristin Mays; George Eads; Sandrine Holt; Justin Hires; Meredith Eaton; Isabel Lucas; Levy Tran; Henry Ian Cusick
- Theme music composer: Randy Edelman
- Composer: Keith Power
- Country of origin: United States
- Original language: English
- No. of seasons: 5
- No. of episodes: 94 (list of episodes)

Production
- Executive producers: Henry Winkler; Paul Downs Colaizzo; James Wan; Peter M. Lenkov; Lee David Zlotoff; Brett Mahoney; Michael Clear; Craig O'Neil; Monica Macer
- Producers: P. Todd Coe; Peter M. Tassler; Lucas Till
- Production locations: Marietta, Georgia; Los Angeles, California (pilot)
- Cinematography: Gabriel Beristain; James L. Carter; Peter Levy; Michael Martinez; Darren Genet; Christopher Duddy; Matthew Moriarty
- Editor: Mark Manos
- Running time: 40–44 minutes
- Production companies: 101st Street Entertainment (seasons 1–4); Atomic Monster; Lionsgate Television; CBS Studios

Original release
- Network: CBS
- Release: September 23, 2016 – April 30, 2021

Related
- MacGyver (original series) (1985–1992)

MacGyver is an American action-adventure television series developed by Peter M. Lenkov that ran on CBS from September 23, 2016 to April 30, 2021, comprising five seasons and 94 episodes. The series stars Lucas Till as the title character, an undercover government agent who prefers to fight crime with ingenious feats of engineering rather than lethal force. It is a reboot of the original series of the same name created by Lee David Zlotoff, which aired from 1985 to 1992. CBS cancelled the show in April 2021; the series finale aired on April 30, 2021.

MacGyver takes place in the same fictional universe as two other series, both also developed by Lenkov and both reboots of earlier shows: Hawaii Five-0 and Magnum P.I. The three shows have been collectively referred to as the "Lenkov-verse".

== Premise ==
Angus "Mac" MacGyver is a U.S. government agent of a secret, privately funded U.S. government intelligence agency (cloaked as a think tank) called the Phoenix Foundation, where he uses his extraordinary talent for problem solving and his extensive knowledge of science to save lives and, in some cases, prevent catastrophes. "With skills that are only limited by his creativity, Mac saves the day using paper clips instead of pistols, birthday candles instead of bombs, and gum instead of guns."

The episodes make frequent use of second-person narrative in the form of voice-overs provided by Lucas Till as Angus MacGyver. The commentary usually provides instructions or "tricks of the trade", as if for a training or orientation film.

== Cast and characters ==
=== Main ===
- Lucas Till as Angus "Mac" MacGyver: Mac is a highly intelligent and incredibly resourceful U.S. operative who works for the Phoenix Foundation, a covert agency operating under the guise of a think tank. Trained as an EOD technician for the U.S. Army, Mac prefers to use non-lethal means to stop his enemies; he is never without his trusty Swiss Army knife and has the uncanny ability to use anything in his environment to his advantage. He is very proficient in chemistry, applied physics and engineering. At the end of season two, he learns that his absent father, James MacGyver, is Oversight—the man who oversees the Phoenix Foundation. Mac then leaves the Phoenix because of his lack of trust in its leadership. He eventually returns after realizing how much they need his skill set.
- George Eads as Jack Dalton (seasons 1–3): Mac's partner in the field and a former Delta Force operator. Jack's history with Mac goes back to his days in the Army and, unlike Mac, he is not afraid to use guns in the field. He also has history with Riley, because he was once in a relationship with her mother and had an altercation with her deadbeat father. While mostly easy-going and laid-back, Jack can get serious when the situation calls for it and often calls upon his special operations training to help the team get out of a tight spot. Midway through season 3, at the end of "Father + Bride + Betrayal", Jack leaves the Phoenix to track Tiberius Kovac, a terrorist thought to have been killed years earlier. In season 5's "Jack + Kinematics + Safe Cracker + MgKNO3 + GTO", it was revealed that Jack had been killed in action while trying to apprehend Kovac.
- Tristin Mays as Riley Davis: A tough-as-nails, sarcastic hacker who is hired by the Phoenix Foundation as their cyber specialist. Riley was originally in prison for trying to hack the NSA in order to save her mother from a reclusive hacktivist group. She had a strained relationship with Jack because he vanished from her and her mother's lives after an altercation with her abusive father, but now views Jack as a father figure.
- Sandrine Holt as Patricia Thornton (season 1): Initial Director of Field Operations at the Phoenix Foundation and, in Mac's own words, the most successful clandestine operative in U.S. history. By the book and serious most of the time, Thornton regularly assigns the team their missions. In the 12th episode, "Screwdriver", she is discovered to be a mole working for the Organization and arrested.
- Justin Hires as Wilt Bozer: Mac's best friend whom he has known since childhood. He is initially a struggling film director possessing several artistic talents. His ability to create lifelike masks and facial prosthetics gets him hired at the Phoenix Foundation, working primarily in robotics. Bozer is a source of comic relief and, in the 1st season, helps Riley in exchange for getting her phone number one digit at a time. When Bozer undergoes training at the Operative Training Center, he falls for fellow recruit Leanna Martin.
- Meredith Eaton as Matilda "Matty" Webber: Thornton's replacement as Director of Operations at Phoenix Foundation and Jack's ex-boss from the CIA. It is revealed in season 3's "Scavengers + Hard Drive + Dragonfly" that she is married, but has not worn a wedding ring since her husband, Ethan Reigns, went on a deep undercover assignment.
- Isabel Lucas as Samantha Cage (season 2), CIA officer and formerly of SASR 4th Squadron. After she is discharged from the CIA for her unsanctioned actions in the second season premiere, Matty recruits her into the Phoenix Foundation. In the episode "Bullet + Pen", she is ambushed and shot by Murdoc, an assassin who is one of MacGyver's main enemies, in her apartment, but survives and returns home to her native Australia to recover.
- Levy Tran as Desiree "Desi" Nguyen (seasons 4–5; recurring season 3), Desi is a new recruit for the Phoenix Foundation who takes over for Jack after he leaves. Though she does things differently than Jack, she seems to be equally effective. She is skilled in six martial arts, and very adept at hand-to-hand combat. The fourth season premiere reveals that Desi and Mac had a brief romantic relationship that ended badly. Their romance is rekindled in season 5.
- Henry Ian Cusick as Russell "Russ" Taylor (seasons 4–5), is an Ex-MI6 Agent. Before joining the Phoenix, he worked as a Private Military Contractor and managed Spearhead Operations. Described as a master manipulator and salesman, Russ is skilled in propaganda and lie detection, and boasts an extremely high emotional intelligence. He is also very wealthy, and thus is used to both getting his way and enjoying the spoils of war (including expensive suits, fast cars, private jets and a house in Monte Carlo). The events of the fourth season portray Russ as being obsessed with destroying Codex, with him later revealing that Codex approached him for recruitment several years ago.

=== Recurring ===
- Tracy Spiridakos as Nikki Carpenter (season 1), an undercover CIA operative who formerly worked as a hacker for DXS until she faked her own death. She is also Mac's ex-girlfriend.
- Amy Acker as Sarah Adler (season 1), a CIA operative and Jack's ex-girlfriend
- David Dastmalchian as Murdoc (seasons 1–3 & 5), an assassin who described himself as one of the best in the world. When he was first introduced, he was referred to as Suspect 218, which is a nod to the original series. Originally, Murdoc was hired to kill Mac, but frequently targeted other members of the Phoenix Foundation after developing a fascination with the group since they are the first ones to survive his attempts to kill them. He is at first thought to have been sent by Nikki, but is later revealed to have been sent by Thornton. Murdoc is especially obsessed with Mac as he sees him as an equal and a "friend."
- Aina Dumlao as Andie Lee (seasons 1–2): Andie Lee was the personal assistant of Patricia Thornton (Sandrine Holt), Director of Field Operations for the DXS and the Phoenix Foundation during the first half of season. She was present when Thornton’s successful career and highest respect in the governmental ranks abruptly ended when she was revealed to be the mole known as ‘Chrysalis’ and arrested for treason in Episode 1×12 (Screwdriver). Thornton was later replaced by Matty Webber (Meredith Eaton) whom Andie continued to work for into early season 2.
- Kate Bond as Jill Morgan: A forensics expert at the Phoenix Foundation. The team members occasionally ask her for help on personal missions. She is seen leading a task force to help capture Murdoc in the third season premiere. Murdoc kills her at the end of the episode.
- Lauren Vélez as Cassandra Glover (season 2), a coordinator for Operative Training Center
- Reign Edwards as Leanna Martin (seasons 2–3), a recruit at the Operative Training Center. Bozer meets and becomes good friends with Leanna, later leading to a romantic relationship that they try to keep secret. In the season 2 finale, Leanna is hired by the Phoenix Foundation. In the fifth season episode "Diamond + Quake + Carbon + Comms + Tower", it is revealed that she was killed on a mission six months prior, a fact that Russ had hidden from Bozer.
- William Baldwin as Elwood Davis (seasons 2–3), Riley's estranged father
- Lance Gross as Billy Colton (seasons 1–3), a member of the Colton bounty hunting family who becomes a love interest of Riley's. Riley breaks up with him after she discovers, on a mission, that Billy was cheating on her.
- Sheryl Lee Ralph as Mama Colton (seasons 1–3), Billy's mother and the head of the Colton bounty hunting family
- Emerson Brooks as Charlie Robinson (seasons 1–3), Mac's old war pal who is now a bomb squad specialist. He was killed by Elliot Mason in Season 3.
- Tate Donovan as James MacGyver/"Oversight" (seasons 2–4), Mac's father who had mysteriously disappeared from his life. He was first introduced in Season 2, and he and Mac slowly developed a relationship again. In Season 3, it was revealed that Oversight had cancer. Oversight was killed after he manually detonated an explosive at Codex headquarters in Season 4, just after he revealed his cancer had returned.
- Sibongile Mlambo as Nasha (season 3), Mac's ex-girlfriend whom he met in Nigeria after briefly leaving the Phoenix Foundation
- Brendan Hines as Ethan Reigns (season 3), Matty's husband who went deep undercover for eight years shortly after their marriage. It's revealed in season 3 that, to keep his cover, Ethan married another woman and had a child with her.
- Peter Weller as Elliot Mason (seasons 3–5), a former military special ops officer and former FBI agent who holds a grudge against James MacGyver for supposedly causing the death of Mason's son
- Leonardo Nam as Aubrey (season 4), Riley's brief love interest, who breaks up with her after Riley reveals where she really works
- Jeri Ryan as Gwendolyn "Gwen" Hayes (season 4), MacGyver's aunt (his mother's sister); an ex-DXS agent who was presumed dead, but is now a high-ranking official within Codex
- Amber Skye Noyes as Scarlett (season 4), a Codex soldier
- Zach McGowan as Roman (seasons 4–5), a Codex soldier
- Alexandra Grey as Parker Phillips (season 5), the newest engineer at Phoenix Foundation

=== Notable guests ===
- Daniel Dae Kim as Lieutenant Chin Ho Kelly, a member of the Five-0 Task Force
- Grace Park as Officer Kono Kalakaua, a member of the Five-0 Task Force
- Taylor Wily as Kamekona Tupuola, an entrepreneur and confidential informant for the Five-0 Task Force
- Michael Des Barres as Nicholas Helman, a hitman who is also Murdoc's mentor. Des Barres played Murdoc in the original MacGyver series.
- Bruce McGill as LAPD Detective Greer. McGill played Jack Dalton in the original MacGyver series.
- Sarah Sokolovic as Amber, Murdoc's ex-wife and mother of their son, Cassian
- Sean Cameron Michael as The Ghost Bomber
- Presilah Nunez as ATF Agent Maria Ramirez, MacGyver's friend from their time in the Army and the handler of ATF K-9 Cody
- Brian "Q" Quinn as Dale, a restaurant patron who slips Mac a candy bar at a fancy restaurant
- James "Murr" Murray as the maitre'd of a restaurant where Mac and Desi go undercover
- Salvatore "Sal" Vulcano as Chef Salvatore, who serves rare delicacies
- Joseph "Joe" Gatto as Larry, a bartender at a restaurant where Mac and Desi go undercover
- Scottie Thompson as Ellen, Angus' deceased mother who appears in a dream sequence and a flashback
- John Ales as Nikola Tesla
- Mark Boyd as Alexander Graham Bell
- Tom Thon as Thomas Edison
- Cuyle Carvin as DXS Agent Charles
- Sean Blakemore as President Danny Linson
- Tobin Bell as Leland
- Jorge Garcia as Jerry Ortega, a former member of the Five-0 Task Force
- Bojana Novakovic as Anya Vitez
- Deepti Gupta as Priya Chanani, Ministry of Defense
- Ernie Hudson as Milton Bozer, Wilt's father
- Wendy Raquel Robinson as Lauretta Bozer, Wilt's mother
- Ben Wang as Eli Brown, a young genius-level intellect & inventor who is a new agent at The Phoenix Foundation

== Production ==
=== Development ===
Title card for the first season, done in the style of the original series. Subsequent seasons featured a different title card after the opening sequence was redesigned.

In October 2015, the original series' executive producer, Henry Winkler, signed on to produce a remake series with James Wan and R. Scott Gemmill for CBS, which owns the rights to MacGyver through its acquisition of the original Paramount Television. In February 2016, it was announced that CBS had greenlit production of a pilot episode written by Paul Downs Colaizzo and directed by Wan. Wan pulled out from directing due to scheduling conflicts and was replaced by David Von Ancken.

In May 2016, the network picked up the series. Co-creator and executive producer Peter M. Lenkov would serve as the showrunner. On May 18, 2016, CBS released a first video trailer for new series. In June 2016, the network scrapped the original pilot, with Wan to direct a new pilot episode. On June 21, 2016, CBS announced that the series would premiere on Friday, September 23, 2016.

On October 17, 2016, CBS ordered a full season of 21 episodes. On March 23, 2017, CBS renewed the series for a second season, which premiered on September 29, 2017. On May 9, 2019, it was announced that CBS renewed the series for a fourth season, which premiered on February 7, 2020. On November 6, 2019, it was announced that CBS had ordered an additional nine episodes in this fourth season, which would've brought the total to 22 episodes. Due to the COVID-19 outbreak, this total was reduced to 20 episodes, with six additional episodes being completely filmed before the production halt. However, producers and CBS later chose to conclude the season with the final episode of the CODEX story arc, which was scripted to fit within the original 13 episode order. This decision came after MacGyver was renewed for a fifth season on May 6, 2020, allowing the final six episodes filmed for season 4 to be moved to season 5. The fifth season premiered on December 4, 2020.

=== Casting ===
In March 2016, Lucas Till was announced as the new MacGyver, Joshua Boone as Gunner, MacGyver's best friend from high school, alongside former and longtime CSI star George Eads as Jack Dalton, who was originally named Lincoln, a man who could easily be written off as an eccentric conspiracy theorist but is a legitimate government employee with great capability for compassion. Later cast were Addison Timlin as Mickey, an app developer who is aggressively progressive in her political views but who has a soft spot for MacGyver, and Michelle Krusiec as Agent Croix, Dalton's sister who works for the Department of Homeland Security. However, the original pilot with this casting was scrapped by CBS in June 2016—a new pilot episode was ordered with only Till and Eads from the original cast continuing on to the revised version of the show.

Around the same time the new pilot was ordered, Justin Hires was cast as Wilt Bozer, MacGyver's roommate who is an aspiring filmmaker. In July 2016, Variety reported that Sandrine Holt had been cast as Patricia Thornton, an ex-field agent who was the director of operations for the Department of External Services, and that Tristin Mays was cast as Riley Davis, a highly unpredictable computer hacker with a chip on her shoulder. Lenkov and Wan said that same month that they wanted to cast Richard Dean Anderson, the original MacGyver actor, into the new show, stating "we’re all MacGyver fanatics so we’re hoping to get him on the show and have him be on this incarnation."

On November 26, 2018, it was announced that George Eads was set to depart the series midway through the show's third season. According to creator Peter M. Lenkov, Eads had asked to be released from his contract for some time so he could spend more time with his young daughter who resides in Los Angeles; the series is filmed in Atlanta. Producers ultimately agreed with Eads being written out of the show but left the opportunity for him to return as a guest star in the future. His final episode aired on February 1, 2019. Eads' character was killed offscreen in the fifth season episode "Jack + Kinematics + Safe Cracker + MgKNO3 + GTO", ruling out any further opportunities for Eads to reprise the role.

=== Lenkov's firing ===
On July 7, 2020, it was reported that Lenkov was fired from his role as executive producer and showrunner following an investigation into allegations that he created a hostile work environment. Lucas Till later told Vanity Fair about being verbally abused and body shamed by Lenkov, stating, "I've never worked this hard in my life, and I am fine with hard work. But the way Peter treats people is just unacceptable. I was suicidal that first year on the show, because of the way he made me feel. But the way he's treated the people around me — that's just my breaking point." Executive producer Monica Macer replaced Lenkov as showrunner.

=== Cancellation ===
On April 7, 2021, with three season 5 episodes remaining, CBS made the announcement that the fifth season would be the show's last, setting the series finale for April 30, 2021.

Series regular Justin Hires thanked CBS for "employing me for 6 years" in a Twitter post following the cancellation, but then got in a possible dig, adding "We're still #1 in our time slot." While confirming Hires' claim, author Jessica Rawden of Cinema Blend noted that MacGyver had seen a steady drop in viewers since George Eads exited in season 3.

=== Book ===
The Official MacGyver Survival Manual: 155 Ways to Save the Day
- Authors: Dr. Rhett Allain; Peter M. Lenkov (foreword); Lucas Till (introduction)
- Language: English
- Publisher: Weldon Owen
- Publication date: September 17, 2019
- Pages: 208
- ISBN: 9781681884349

The Official MacGyver Survival Manual: 155 Ways to Save the Day is a book that gives instructions on how to "MacGyver" things as seen in MacGyver. The book was written by Dr. Rhett Allain, the show's resident physicist. The foreword was written by Peter M. Lenkov, and the introduction was written by Lucas Till. The Official MacGyver Survival Manual: 155 Ways to Save the Day was released on September 17, 2019.

== Episodes ==
Season	Episodes	Originally released	
Season	Episodes	First released	Last released
1	21	September 23, 2016	April 14, 2017
2	23	September 29, 2017	May 4, 2018
3	22	September 28, 2018	May 10, 2019
4	13	February 7, 2020	May 8, 2020
5	15	December 4, 2020	April 30, 2021

=== Crossovers ===
Crossover between		Episode(s)	Type	Actors crossing over	Date aired
Series A	Series B	Episode(s)	Type	Actors crossing over	Date aired
MacGyver	Hawaii Five-0	"Flashlight" (MacGyver 1.18)	One-part crossover	Appearing in Series A: Daniel Dae Kim, Grace Park, Taylor Wily	March 10, 2017
Main article: Flashlight (MacGyver) The Phoenix Foundation team of MacGyver gets rerouted to Hawaii after a 7.2 magnitude earthquake hits the coast of Hawaii. While aiding Detective Chin Ho Kelly and Officer Kono Kalakaua from Five-0 task force, they also have to deal with Chinese intelligence soldiers who use the earthquake to steal top-secret weaponry that the scientists are currently developing.
MacGyver	Hawaii Five-0	SOS+ Hazmat + Ultrasound + Frequency + Malihini (MacGyver 5.8)	Guest appearance	Appearing in Series A: Jorge Garcia	February 12, 2021

== Reception ==
=== Ratings ===
Season	Time slot (ET/PT)	Episodes	Season premiere		Season finale		TV season	Rank	Viewers (in millions)
Season	Time slot (ET/PT)	Episodes	Date	Viewers (in millions)	Date	Viewers (in millions)	TV season	Rank	Viewers (in millions)
1	Friday 8:00 pm	21	September 23, 2016	10.90	April 14, 2017	6.57	2016–17	27	9.80
2	Friday 8:00 pm	23	September 29, 2017	6.69	May 4, 2018	6.10	2017–18	38	8.59
3	Friday 8:00 pm	22	September 28, 2018	5.77	May 10, 2019	5.47	2018–19	48	7.70
4	Friday 8:00 pm	13	February 7, 2020	5.94	May 8, 2020	5.77	2019–20	44	7.50
5	Friday 8:00 pm	15	December 4, 2020	4.90	April 30, 2021	4.48	2020–21	44	5.90

=== Critical response ===
MacGyver received generally a mixed opinion from television critics, with many comparing it poorly to the original and some praising and criticizing CBS for making it an updated show. Rotten Tomatoes shows a 25% rating for Season 1, with the site's critical consensus reading, "Despite using spare parts from countless successful TV procedurals, the new MacGyver fails to cobble together a compelling show." Metacritic gives a score of 38 out of 100, indicating "generally unfavorable reviews".

USA Today wrote: "If... you're looking for something approaching the original's simple DIY charms—or, for that matter, something even marginally original—look elsewhere. What you're getting here is a factory-made retread that is less MacGyver than MacGyver: Impossible, with the title character now just one member of an impossible mission team.... MacGyver may not fully engage you, but at least it won't actively annoy you."

IGN's verdict was: "CBS' MacGyver is an unnecessary, middling reboot that has little to offer—its biggest sin being a bland hero and eye-rolling stakes. Lifting more than a few swerves from the Mission Impossible franchise, this new MacGyver somehow even manages to make the science gimmick dull."

Movie Pilot was more positive, commending Till's performance, while noting that the show does a good job of "maintaining the essence of the original while appealing to a modern generation".

Irish Film Critic stated being satisfied with the reboot: "Season 1 introduced us to the new characters and while it took some getting used to, after years of watching Richard Dean Anderson doing his thing, about halfway through season 1, I was finally able to accept Lucas Till as the new MacGyver. He is charming, charismatic, and when it calls for it, courageous, at times, putting his own life over that of everyone around him. The chemistry between the entire main cast is obvious and everyone has their own individual idiosyncrasies and character traits but never is it more evident than when they're all together. Over time, they have become a family as a result of their trials, tribulations, and missions and usually with the closing of each episode, they rendezvous at Mac and Bozer's place in the Hollywood Hills, share a laugh, have a beer, and generally, try to keep a positive outlook on what is to come. Exactly what a family is supposed to do."

=== Awards and nominations ===
Year	Award	Category	Recipient(s)	Result	Ref.
2017	People's Choice Awards	Favorite New TV Drama	MacGyver	Won	
2017	Creative Arts Emmy Awards	Outstanding Stunt Coordination for a Drama Series, Limited Series, or Movie	Jeff Wolfe	Won	
2017	BMI Awards	—N/a	Keith Power	Won	
2018	Teen Choice Awards	Choice TV Actor: Action	Lucas Till	Nominated	
2019	Teen Choice Awards	Choice TV Show: Action	MacGyver	Won	
2019	Teen Choice Awards	Choice TV Actor: Action	Lucas Till	Won	

== Home media ==
The first season was released on DVD in region 1 on February 27 and second season on September 18, 2018. In 2022 in the UK a box set was released of all 5 seasons

DVD name	Episode number	Release date
MacGyver: Season 1	21	February 27, 2018
MacGyver: Season 2	23	September 18, 2018
MacGyver: Season 3	22	January 14, 2020
MacGyver: Season 4	13	June 8, 2021
MacGyver: The Complete Series	94	June 14, 2022
