= Southern Conference Educational Fund =

Southern Conference Educational Fund (SCEF)
- Map of the U.S. South (2011), region supported by the SCEF
- Predecessor: Southern Conference for Human Welfare (SCHW)
- Formation: November 20, 1942; 83 years ago
- Dissolved: 1981; 45 years ago
- Purpose: Promote social justice, civil rights, electoral reform
- Headquarters: New Orleans; Louisville; Atlanta
- Region served: American South
- Key people: Anne Braden, Carl Braden
- Staff: Carol Hanisch, Bob Zellner, Dorothy Zellner

The Southern Conference Educational Fund (SCEF) (1942–1981) was an organization that sought to promote social justice, civil rights, and electoral reform in the American South, particularly for African Americans. The organization began as the Education Fund of the Southern Conference for Human Welfare (SCHW), before becoming an independent successor organization after the SCHW was disbanded in 1948.

== History ==
During 1948, the SCHW split over its support for presidential candidate: some members supported Progressive Party candidate Henry A. Wallace, others the Democratic Party's incumbent US President Harry S. Truman. SCHW officers met in November 1948 and voted to end the floundering organization. On November 20, 1948, SCHW leaders met at Monticello, Virginia, and passed a resolution to reformulate the organizations's last remaining group, the Southern Conference Educational Fund (SCEF), "committed solely to the ending of segregation in the south." The next day, November 21, 1948, SCHW leaders voted to disband.

In 1969, while serving as a staff member of SCEF, the civil rights activist and feminist Dorothy Zellner wrote a memo critiquing feminist consciousness-raising groups as "therapy" and for being insufficiently "political". In response, fellow SCEF member Carol Hanisch addressed an essay to the women's caucus of the SCEF in February 1969. Originally titled "Some Thoughts in Response to Dottie's Thoughts on a Women's Liberation Movement", the article was republished in 1970 in the book Notes from the Second Year: Women's Liberation under the title "The Personal is Political". The essay has since become widely circulated in feminist circles.

Due to financial problems, the organization disbanded in 1981.

== Works ==
- Southern Patriot (SCEF newspaper)

== See also ==
- Anne Braden
- Carl Braden
- Carol Hanisch
- Aubrey Willis Williams
- Bob Zellner
- Dorothy Zellner
- New York Radical Women
- The personal is political
