= Dorothy Zellner =

American human rights activist and feminist

Dorothy Miller Zellner
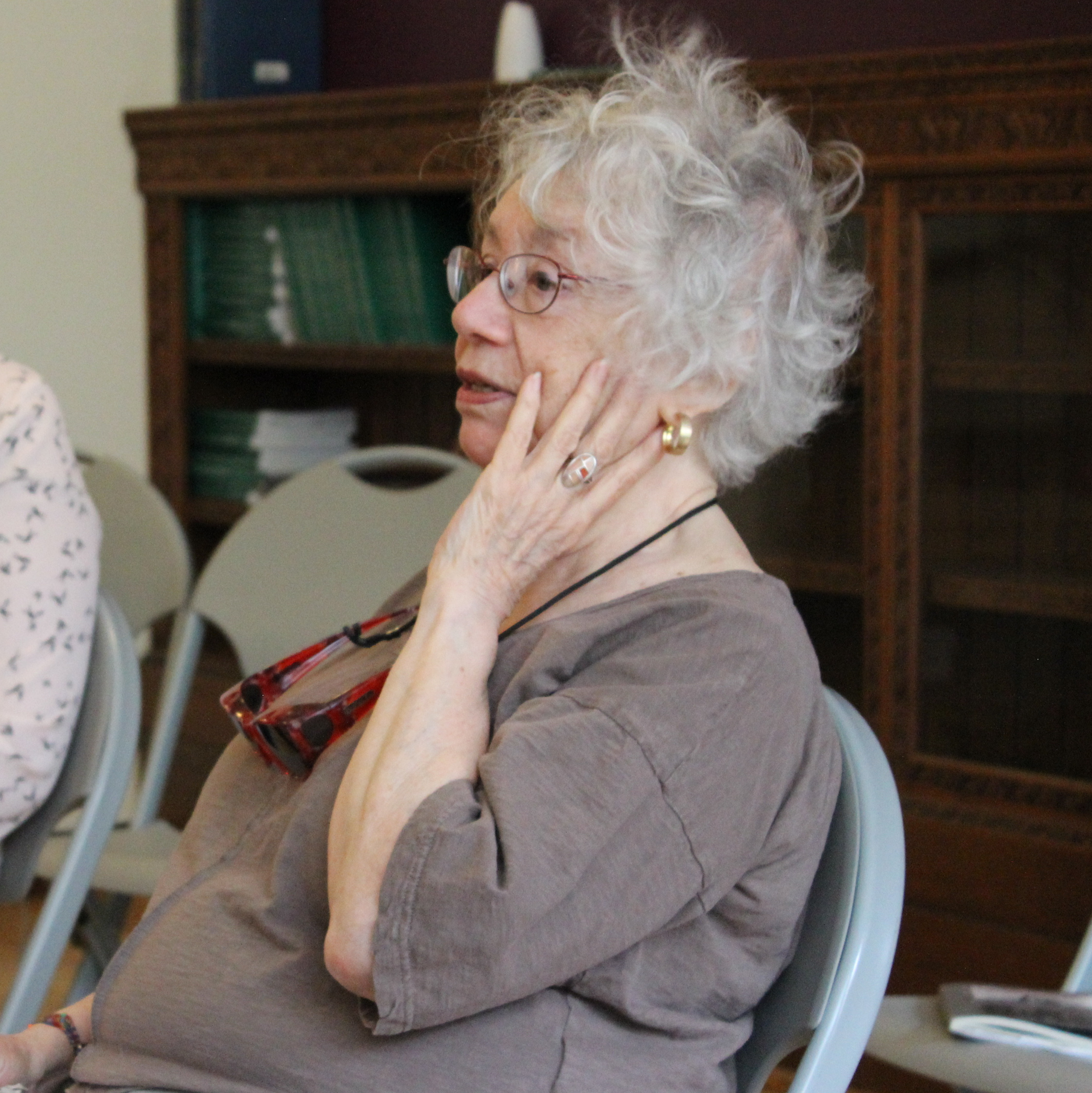
- Zellner in 2019
- Born: 1938 (age 87–88); New York City, New York, U.S.
- Education: Queens College, City University of New York
- Occupation: Civil rights activist
- Spouse: Bob Zellner (m. 1962, divorced)

Dorothy "Dottie" Miller Zellner (born 1938) is an American human rights activist, feminist, editor, lecturer, and writer. A veteran of the 1960s civil rights movement, she served as a recruiter for the Freedom Summer project and was co-editor of Student Voice, the student newsletter of the Student Nonviolent Coordinating Committee. She is active in the Palestinian solidarity movement.

== Early life ==
Zellner was born in Manhattan and raised by left-wing secular non-Zionist Jewish immigrant parents who could speak Yiddish. Her parents raised her with an awareness of Black history, racial justice, socialism, the Soviet Union, and Jewish resistance to Nazism. She credits the Jewish social justice tradition of her parents for inspiring her to become involved in the civil rights movement. Zellner graduated from Queens College. Zellner is "100% atheist".

== Political activism ==
In 1966, Zellner helped design the logo for the Black Panther Party. She was asked by Stokely Carmichael to go to Zoo Atlanta and photograph a panther for inspiration. Her husband Bob Zellner and another SNCC member took photographs and Zellner created a sketch. Carmichael requested that Zellner make another attempt based on a rough drawing by SNCC member Ruth Howard that Howard had based on the mascot of Clark Atlanta University. In 1967, Zellner's second drawing become the official Black Panther Party logo.

In 1969, while serving as a staff member of the Southern Conference Educational Fund (SCEF), Zellner wrote a memo critiquing feminist consciousness-raising groups as "therapy" and for being insufficiently "political." In response, fellow SCEF member Carol Hanisch addressed an essay to the women's caucus of the SCEF in February 1969. Originally titled "Some Thoughts in Response to Dottie’s Thoughts on a Women’s Liberation Movement", the article was republished in 1970 in the book Notes from the Second Year: Women's Liberation under the title "The Personal is Political." The essay has since become widely circulated in feminist circles.

Zellner worked as a nurse for several years, before she joined the Center for Constitutional Rights in 1984. She became director of publications and development for Queens College School of Law in 1998.

After hearing a talk by Israeli peace activist Uri Avnery in 2002, Zellner became involved in the Israeli-Palestinian peace movement. Since 2002, she has traveled to Israel and Palestine on dozens of occasions, volunteered with Physicians for Human Rights, and is an active supporter of the Boycott, Divestment and Sanctions movement (BDS).

== See also ==
- Black Panther Party
- Lowndes County Freedom Organization
- The personal is political
