= Rita Schwerner Bender =

Civil rights activist and lawyer (born 1942)

Rita Schwerner Bender (née Levant; born 1942) is an American civil rights activist and lawyer. She and her first husband, Michael Schwerner, participated in the Freedom Summer of 1964, where Michael was murdered by the Ku Klux Klan. As his young widow, she drew national attention for her commentary on racial prejudice in the United States, delivered at a press conference after her husband went missing. After the Civil Rights Movement, Schwerner became an attorney, practicing family law in Washington state. She continues to advocate for civil rights through her law practice and public presentations.

== Early life ==
Rita Levant and Michael Schwerner both grew up in New York City. They married when she was 20 and he was 22.

== Activism ==
The Schwerners became active in the civil rights movement first in the north; she and Michael were both arrested at a civil rights protest in Baltimore in July 1963.

=== Freedom Summer and death of Michael Schwerner ===
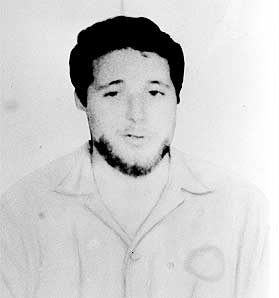
Michael Schwerner

The Schwerners moved to Meridian, Mississippi in January 1964.

She was a teacher, and the two worked at a freedom school and registering black voters. The summer of 1964, known as "Freedom Summer" was an endeavor to register more black voters in the deep south. It was headed up by civil rights activist groups such as the Congress for Racial Equality (CORE) and the Student Nonviolent Coordinating Committee (SNCC).

Rita and Michael Schwerner were among a group of three hundred students who went to Mississippi to help with the voting campaign. They were 22 and 24 years old. In June 1964, the Schwerners were attending a civil rights activism training in Ohio when they learned a church involved in the movement in Neshoba County, Mississippi, had been burned down and its clergy beaten. Michael Schwerner, James Chaney, a black man, and Andrew Goodman, who was white (as were the Schwerners) drove the Schwerner family station wagon back to Mississippi to investigate. On Sunday, June 21, the three men were driving together when they were stopped by Neshoba deputy sheriff Cecil Price outside of the town of Philadelphia, Mississippi. Price arrested the three men on charge of speeding and locked them in the jailhouse, only to release them around 10pm that night. The men were never seen again.

Rita Schwerner was still in Ohio when she learned of their disappearance, and two days later, at the Cincinnati airport with Fannie Lou Hamer and getting ready to travel back to Mississippi, Schwerner learned their station wagon had been found burned, in a swamp. She returned to Mississippi, for safety "staying [at a] black-owned hotel, with a guard organized by black ministers keeping watch outside."

Schwerner spoke actively, pressing President Johnson to expand the federal government's efforts to find them.

The national media covered the story in detail, and FBI posters went up for the three all over the country. In the wake of this national crisis and the disappearance of her husband, Rita Schwerner was interviewed by the media in Meridian, Mississippi and gave this response:

It is tragic, as far as I am concerned, that white northerners have to be caught up in the machinery of injustice and indifference in the South. Before the American people register concern, I personally suspect that if Mr. Chaney, who is a native Mississippian negro, had been alone at the time of the disappearance that this case like so many other that have come before would have been completely unnoticed.

Soon it was discovered that Schwerner, Chaney, and Goodman had been murdered by the Ku Klux Klan. Sheriff Price was affiliated with the Klan and had participated in the murder. Three years later, Price was convicted with the killing of the three men and was given six years in prison. He died in 2001 at the age of 63. Although there were other Klan members involved in the murder, only six of these were convicted along with Price.

==== Edgar Ray Killen Case ====
In 2005, 41 years after the murders of James Chaney, Andrew Goodman, and Michael Schwerner, Edgar Ray Killen was found guilty of three counts of manslaughter and was sentenced to 60 years in prison. Rita testified and responded to the verdict with:

On the one hand, I understood the symbolic importance of a conviction and the real importance of it. This man should have been convicted of murder. The fact that a jury of 12 people in this county could not agree to convict him of murder indicates that there are still a lot of people in the state who choose to look the other way. The one thing that they had to have found was that he acted with malice. No one sitting and listening to evidence this week could have truly believed that he did not intend to have these men killed.

=== Continued civil rights activism ===
After her husband's death, Schwerner stayed in Mississippi and continued to pursue civil rights work with the Mississippi Freedom Democratic Party. In particular she worked on an action "challeng[ing] the all-white Mississippi delegation" to the 1964 Democratic National Convention in Atlantic City: "Delegates used borrowed passes to march on the convention floor and were hauled away by guards, galvanizing Mississippi's black population. Rita Schwerner testified before the credentials committee with Freedom Democratic Party members standing in silent tribute."

== Education ==
Schwerner earned her Bachelor's degree at Queens College in New York City and then chose to pursue her law degree. She attended Rutgers School of Law in New Jersey in 1965, graduating three years after her husband was murdered. Out of 150 students in the graduating class of 1968, Schwerner was one of five women. While studying at Rutgers, she also met her second husband, William J. Bender.

== Law practice ==
Rita Schwerner Bender is a private family practice attorney in Washington State. Her areas of specialty are family law, adoption and assisted reproduction, professional ethics and discipline, and "specializes in providing indigent defendants access to legal assistance."

Bender continues to be active in the fight for civil rights, speaking on topics like "Searching for Restorative Justice: The Trial of Edgar Ray Killen" and "Racial Disparity in Education and State Action." Additionally, Bender has written or co-written several publications pertaining to her areas of law practice. A few of her works are "FAQ: Surrogacy, Sperm Donation and Egg Donation in Washington for Prospective Gay and Lesbian Parents" (with Raegen N. Rasnic and Janet M. Helson) and "Washington State Legal Technician Rule: Myths and Facts," which appeared in the Washington State Bar news in 2008.
