= Field secretary =

Position within various civil rights organizations

Field secretary is a position within various civil rights organizations in the United States, such as the National Association for the Advancement of Colored People (NAACP) and the Student Nonviolent Coordinating Committee (SNCC). In the NAACP, it was the highest-ranking position of each state chapter of the organization.

== Notable field secretaries ==
- Ella Baker
- Medgar Evers
- Fannie Lou Hamer
- James Weldon Johnson
- John Lewis
- Gilbert R. Mason
- Bob Moses
- Rosa Parks
- Walter F. White
- Bob Zellner
