= Lucas Till =

American actor (born 1990)

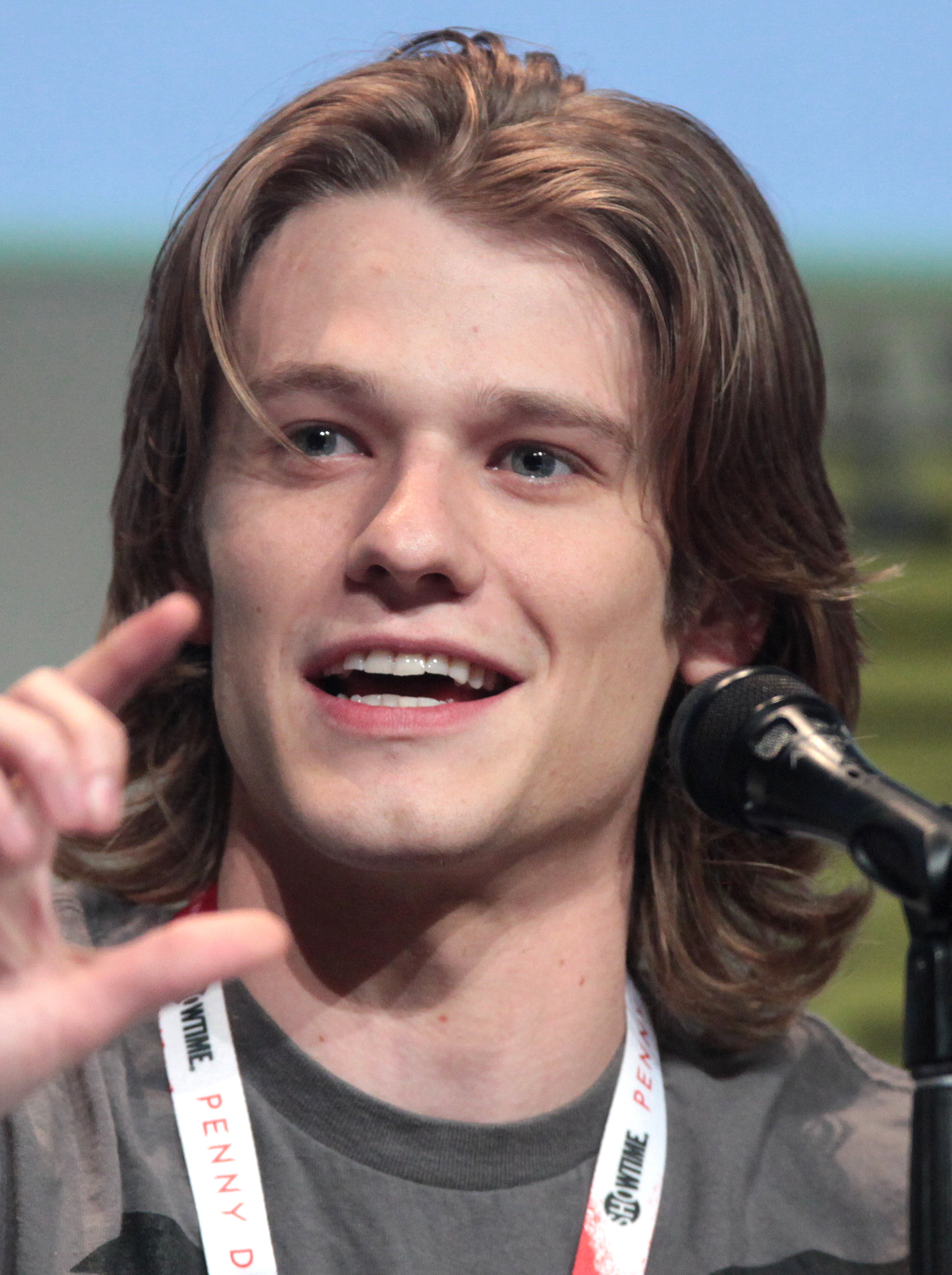
- Till at the 2015 San Diego Comic Con
- Born: Lucas Daniel Till; August 10, 1990 (age 36); Fort Hood, Texas, U.S.
- Occupation: Actor
- Years active: 2003–present
- Spouse: Skyler Samuels (m. 2024)
- Children: 2

Lucas Daniel Till (born August 10, 1990) is an American actor. He began his career in the early 2000s with roles in independent films, before gaining early attention for his supporting role in the biopic Walk the Line (2005). He had his breakthrough with romantic lead roles in the Disney film Hannah Montana: The Movie and music videos for Taylor Swift's "You Belong with Me" and Miley Cyrus' "The Climb" (all 2009).

The action comedies The Spy Next Door (2010) and Monster Trucks (2016) brought Till wider attention, and he had box office success with his portrayal of Havok in 20th Century Fox's X-Men prequel films (2011–2016). Till next played the eponymous role in the CBS action crime drama series MacGyver (2016–2021), a reboot of the 1980s series of the same name. He subsequently garnered critical acclaim for his portrayal of Bob Zellner in the historical biopic Son of the South (2020), before starring in the action film The Collective (2023) and the Netflix western series The Abandons (2025).

== Early life and education ==
Till was born on August 10, 1990, in Fort Hood, Texas. He is the son of chemist Dana Lyn (née Brady) and John Mark Till, a colonel in the Army. He has a younger brother, Nick (b. 1997). Till spent most of his childhood living in the suburbs of Atlanta, Georgia. His family noticed he enjoyed impersonating voices and characters. When he was 11 his mother enrolled him in local acting classes, and it was not long before he was discovered by Joy Pervis, an agent from a Talent agency in Atlanta. Till began booking almost immediately in print, local, regional, and national commercials. He later attended Kell High School. After filming for The Hannah Montana Movie in Nashville, Till went back home to graduate with the Kell High School class of 2008. After graduation, he moved to Los Angeles, California, to continue acting.

== Career ==
=== 2000s: Early career and Hannah Montana film ===
In 2003, Till made his first film collaboration in the short film The Lovesong of Edwerd J. Robble, in the role of Michael. At the age of 12, he was cast in The Adventures of Ociee Nash in which he played Harry Vanderbilt, the bully of the main character. In 2004, Till played the role of Jay in the horror film Lightning Bug which filmed in Fairview, Alabama, and, later, he participated in the short film Pee Shy, playing Chad. His first major movie role was Jack Cash, the older brother of Johnny Cash, who died in a sawmill accident, in the biographical film Walk the Line (2005). After Walk the Line, Till was featured in a number of television films for Lifetime and independent films. For example, the following year, Till played the young Samuel North in a feature film The Other Side filmed in Atlanta, Georgia. In 2006, he also joined the cast of the Lifetime television film Not Like Everyone Else, portraying Kyle Kenney.

In 2008, Till starred as Jensen in Gregg Bishop's horror-comedy Dance of the Dead which was hand-picked by director Sam Raimi for distribution through Lions Gate Entertainment and Ghost House Pictures. He was also invited to participate in the fifth season of the American television series House in the episode titled "Joy to the World" in the role of Simon, a high school student who has a romantic relationship with his schoolmate, but due to their social differences, they cannot be together. Three weeks before graduating from high school, Till auditioned for Hannah Montana: The Movie (starring Miley Cyrus) and landed the role of Travis Brody, a young cowboy and Miley's friend who ends up becoming her love interest. The role garnered Till two nominations at the 2009 Teen Choice Awards, in the Choice Movie Actor: Music/Dance and Choice Movie: Liplock (shared with Cyrus) categories respectively. As part of the awards promotion campaign, Till recorded three short films: Not Another Changeling Movie, a parody of Angelina Jolie's movie Changeling; The Red Menace and The Bourneson Stupidity, a parody of the film The Bourne Identity.

In early 2009, he participated in the horror film Laid to Rest as a commercial employee. He also participated in the episodes "Scotophobia" and "Hydrophobia" of the horror web series Fear Clinic playing the character of Brett, a young man suffering from hydrophobia. He starred in the music video for Taylor Swift's "You Belong with Me" as her next-door neighbour and love interest. Till and Swift first met in 2008 while filming for Hannah Montana: The Movie. In 2009, he participated in the fifth season of Medium in the role of Adam Mankowitz in the episode titled "Things to do in Phoenix when you're dead", and on Leo Little's Big Show along with Emily Osment in the episode titled "Hannah Montana: The Movie". He was also part of the starring cast in the movie The Lost & Found Family released directly in DVD format and distributed by Sony Pictures Home Entertainment. His character was Justin, a young boy with some bad attitudes.

=== 2010s: Career fluctuations and breakthrough with MacGyver ===
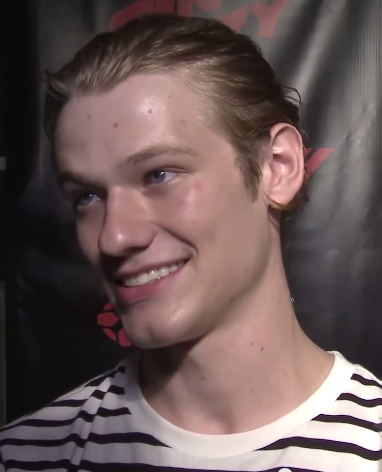
Till in 2014

In early 2010, Till played the role of a Russian agent in the film The Spy Next Door starring Jackie Chan. That same year, he played Matt Parker, a high school quarterback in the first season of Blue Mountain State in the episode titled "The Legend of the Golden Arm". He also returned to collaborate in the co-production in an independent science fiction adventure film directed by Jason Trost and in which he also plays Jack, a young man on vacation in Asia who realizes that his horrible dreams are becoming a reality and that reality is turning into a nightmare. The movie was called "Vacation 8". In 2011, he was part of the cast of the Columbia Pictures-produced action science fiction film Battle: Los Angeles as Corporal Grayston. Till played Alex Summers/Havok, a mutant who has the ability to absorb solar energy which he can then launch as plasma energy from his body in the X-Men spin-off X-Men: First Class, a superhero film produced by 20th Century Fox and Marvel Entertainment directed by Matthew Vaughn. This role allowed him to receive a nomination for the 13th Teen Choice Awards in the Choice Movie: Chemistry category (shared with Jennifer Lawrence, Nicholas Hoult, Zoë Kravitz, Caleb Landry Jones, and Edi Gathegi).

In 2011, the actor took his first steps into the world of audiovisual production, collaborating with the production of the independent superhero film All Superheroes Must Die (also known as Vs) and in which he also plays the role of Ben / Cutthroat. In the film, four superheroes (one of whom is Till) are kidnapped by their arch enemy and are forced to compete in a series of challenges to save an abandoned city full of kidnapped innocent civilians. Later that year, he collaborated on the music video accompanying the performance of Adele's song "Someone like You" by Tony Oller. In the video, Till plays Tony's friend who gets in the way of their love affair. In 2011, he also made a commercial for an international brand of sports shoes.

In 2012, Till returned to work in dramas by participating in the movie Dark Hearts in the role of Sam, a young man who travels to the city to spend time with his older brother and thus escape problems at home. He next worked with Nicole Kidman on the 2013 film Stoker, in which he played a bragging young man named Chris Pitts. He was also part of the starring cast in the direct-to-DVD film Crush as Scott Norris, a star member of the high school soccer team who despite having a knee injury caused by a blow in a game runs every morning. That same year, he returned to collaborate with Jason Trost in the production of the independent comedy Wet and Reckless and in which he played Toby 'Dollars'. He also participated with Liam Hemsworth, Gary Oldman and Harrison Ford in the film Paranoia as Kevin, friend and co-worker of Adam (Liam Hemsworth).

In 2014, Till returned to movies in the horror genre by participating in the film Wolves as Cayden Richards, a high school student who is becoming a werewolf and who after the murder of his parents tries to discover the truth of who he really is. He appeared in the thriller and drama movie Sins of our Youth as Tyler, alongside Joel Courtney, Mitchel Musso and Bridger Zardina. He was also a co-producer on the horror and suspense film My Eleventh. He also participated in the television series Comedy Bang! Bang! in the first episode of the third season titled "Patton Oswalt Wears a Black Blazer & Dress Shoes" and reprised his role as Havok in X-Men: Days of Future Past, the sequel to 2011's First Class.

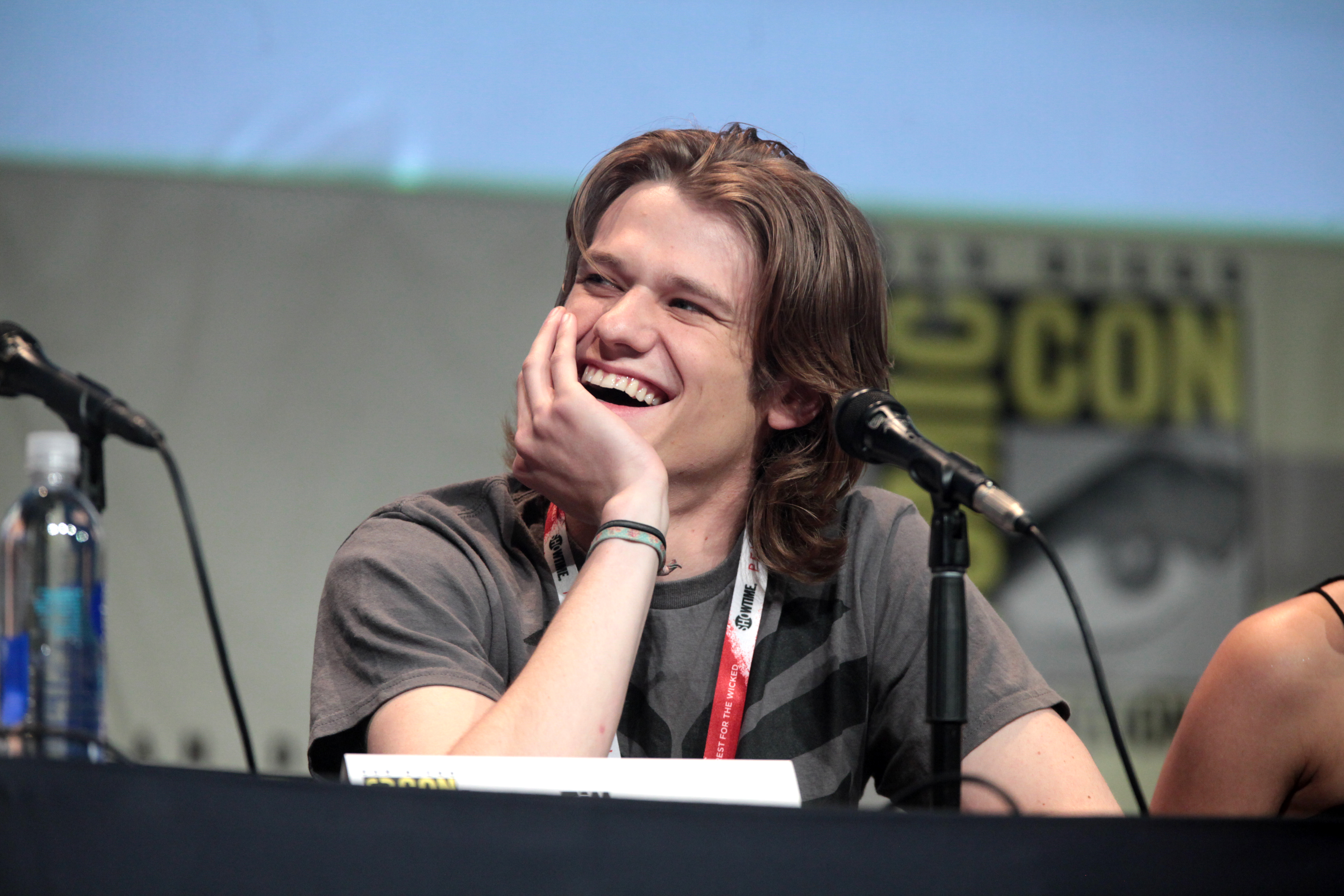
Till promoting MacGyver at the 2015 San Diego Comic-Con

In 2015, Till participated in the dramatic film Bravetown, originally titled Strings, playing the role of Josh Harvest a DJ in his early and formative stage, and in the suspense movie The Curse of Downers Grove in the role of Bobby. Both movies released directly in DVD format.

In 2016, Till played Ben Philips Jr. in the horror film The Disappointments Room and returned as Havok in X-Men: Apocalypse, the third installment in the X-Men prequel films series. That same year, he began starring as Angus "Mac" MacGyver in the television reboot of MacGyver, which airs on CBS. Mac is a secret agent of a United States government organization that uses his extraordinary talent to solve problems and his extensive knowledge of science to save lives. Paramount Animation together with Nickelodeon Movies produced the comedy and adventure film titled Monster Trucks, directed by Blue Sky Studios founder Chris Wedge in which Till starred as Tripp.

During 2016 and 2017, he started working on a project as a co-producer, the science fiction and suspense film Spectrum playing the role of a young scientist named Connor.

He also participated in the one-hour animated television special titled Michael Jackson's Halloween which premiered on CBS in October 2017 lending his voice to the character of Vincent, a young store clerk who wants to be a DJ. In the same month, he participated with CBS Cares in a television campaign in support of hurricane relief in Puerto Rico after Hurricane Maria struck the area.

CBS renewed MacGyver in which Till played the starring role, continuing his role in the second, third and fourth seasons. This leading role allowed him to receive the nomination in 2018 in the 20th edition of the Teen Choice Awards in the category of Choice TV Actor: Action, a nomination that he also received in 2019 in the 21st broadcast of the Teen Choice Awards in the same category. In addition to the leading role, Till collaborated in the production of the 13 episodes that make up the fourth season of the series.

In 2019, he collaborated again with CBS Cares in a television campaign in support of the fight against lupus.

=== 2020s: MacGyver finale and critical success in film ===
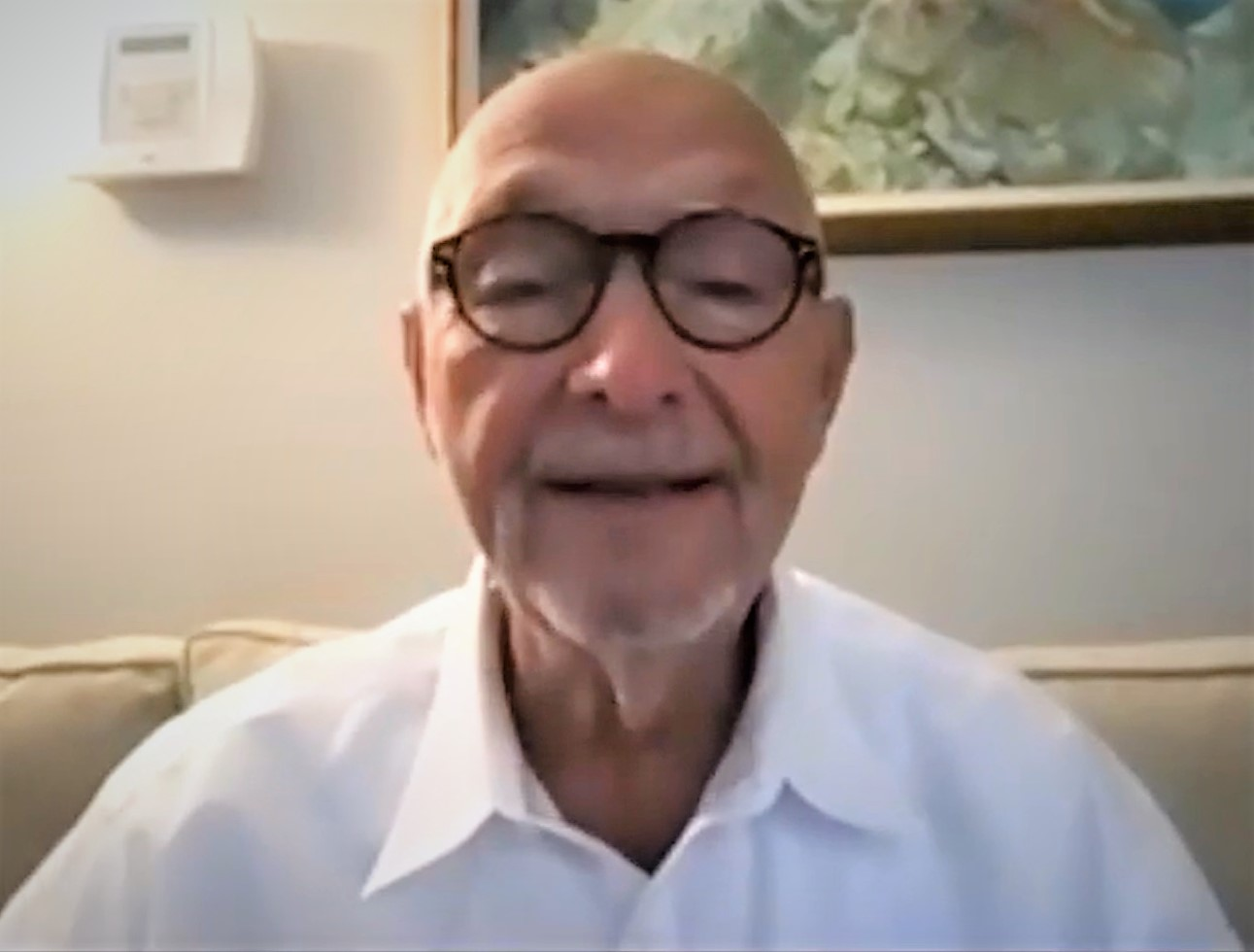
Till's portrayal of Bob Zellner (pictured) in Son of the South garnered critical acclaim.

He renewed his contract in 2020 to continue his leading role in the fifth season of MacGyver. Till has said in interviews that he was the subject of verbal abuse and body shaming from the showrunner of MacGyver, Peter Lenkov. Till reported being suicidal in the first year of the filming of MacGyver due to Lenkov's abuse. Lenkov was later fired from CBS on July 7, 2020.

Till played Bob Zellner, the grandson of a member of the Ku Klux Klan, who joins the civil rights movement in the United States in the film Son of the South, based on Zellner's autobiography The Wrong Side of Murder Creek. Written and directed by Barry Alexander Brown, the film received mixed reviews from critics, although Till's performance was widely praised. YouTube film critic Jackie K. Cooper praised his performance, saying Till "does a very good job". The New York Times and Variety also praised Till's performance.

In March 2024, Till was cast as Garret Van Ness in the Netflix western series The Abandons, starring opposite Gillian Anderson and Nick Robinson. Filming began in Spring the same year, after being delayed due to the 2023 Hollywood labor disputes.

== Personal life ==
Around 2017–2018, Till began dating actress Skyler Samuels. In March 2024, Samuels revealed that the two had since gotten married and were currently residing in Till's hometown of Atlanta, Georgia. They have two children, born in 2024 and 2026 respectively.

== Filmography ==
=== Film ===
Year	Title	Role	Notes
2003	The Lovesong of Edwerd J. Robble	Michael	Short film
2003	The Adventures of Ociee Nash	Harry Vanderbilt	
2004	Pee Shy	Chad	Short film
2004	Lightning Bug	Jay Graves	
2005	Walk the Line	Young Jack Cash	
2006	The Other Side	Young Samuel North	
2008	Dance of the Dead	Jensen	Direct-to-video
2009	Laid to Rest	Young Store Clerk	Direct-to-video
2009	Hannah Montana: The Movie	Travis Brody	
2009	The Lost & Found Family	Justin	Direct-to-video
2010	The Spy Next Door	Larry	
2011	Battle: Los Angeles	Cpl. Scott Grayston	
2011	X-Men: First Class	Alex Summers/Havok	
2011	All Superheroes Must Die	Cutthroat/Ben	Direct-to-video; also producer
2012	Dark Hearts	Sam	Direct-to-DVD
2013	Stoker	Chris Pitts	
2013	Crush	Scott Norris	Direct-to-video
2013	Wet and Reckless	Toby 'Dollars'	Direct-to-video; also producer
2013	Paranoia	Kevin	
2014	Wolves	Cayden Richards	Direct-to-video
2014	Kristy	Aaron	Direct-to-video
2014	Sins of Our Youth	Tyler	
2014	X-Men: Days of Future Past	Alex Summers/Havok	
2015	Bravetown	Josh Harvest	Direct-to-video
2015	The Curse of Downers Grove	Bobby	Direct-to-video
2016	X-Men: Apocalypse	Alex Summers/Havok	
2016	The Disappointments Room	Ben Philips Jr.	
2017	Monster Trucks	Tripp Coley	
2020	Son of the South	Bob Zellner	
2023	The Collective	Sam Alexander	
2026	Clean Hands	Deputy Dormer	

=== Television ===
Year	Title	Role	Notes
2006	Not Like Everyone Else	Kyle Kenney	Television film
2008	House	Simon	Episode: "Joy to the World"
2009	Medium	Adam Mankowitz	Episode: "Things to Do in Phoenix When You're Dead"
2009	Fear Clinic	Brett	Episodes: "Scotophobia" and "Hydrophobia"
2010	Blue Mountain State	Golden Arm/Matt Parker	Episode: "The Legend of the Golden Arm"
2014	Comedy Bang! Bang!	Thief	Episode: "Patton Oswalt Wears a Black Blazer & Dress Shoes"
2016–2021	MacGyver	MacGyver	Lead role
2017	Michael Jackson's Halloween	Vincent (voice)	Television special
2025	The Abandons	Garret Van Ness	Main role

=== Music videos ===
Year	Title	Artist
2009	"You Belong with Me"	Taylor Swift
2009	"The Climb"	Miley Cyrus

=== Producer ===
Year	Title	Notes
2011	All Superheroes Must Die	Co-producer
2013	Wet and Reckless	Co-producer
2014	My Eleventh	Co-producer
2017	Spectrum	Co-producer
2020	MacGyver	Co-producer

== Awards and nominations ==
Year	Award	Category	Nominated work	Result
Teen Choice Awards	2009	Choice Movie Actor: Music/Dance	Hannah Montana: The Movie	Nominated
Teen Choice Awards	2009	Choice Movie: Liplock (shared with Miley Cyrus)	Hannah Montana: The Movie	Nominated
Teen Choice Awards	2011	Choice Movie: Chemistry (shared with Jennifer Lawrence, Nicholas Hoult, Zoë Kravitz, Caleb Landry Jones, and Edi Gathegi)	X-Men: First Class	Nominated
Teen Choice Awards	2018	Choice TV Actor: Action	MacGyver	Nominated
Teen Choice Awards	2019	Choice TV Actor: Action	MacGyver	Nominated
