= Levy Tran =

American actress (born 1983)

- Born: Vy Le Tran; April 8, 1983 (age 43); San Jose, California, U.S.
- Education: San Jose State University (BA)
- Occupations: Actress; model
- Years active: 2011–present
- Height: 5 ft 6 in (1.68 m)

Vy Le "Levy" Tran (born April 8, 1983) is a Vietnamese-American actress and model.

== Early life ==
Vy Le Tran was born in San Jose, California, U.S., to Vietnamese parents. She can speak English and Vietnamese. After graduating from Piedmont Hills High School, she received a Bachelor's degree in Child and Adolescent Development while minoring in mathematics. Afterwards, she worked at a funeral home as an embalmer in 2011.

== Career ==
In 2011, Tran pursued a modeling career, and after doing commercials decided to move to Los Angeles in 2012. Tran then became successful in modeling as a top Asian female model. Tran modeled for top brands like Inked Magazine, Glass Magazine and Tattoo Life. She has stated that her favorite tattoo on her body is her zombie tattoo because of its artistry, but partially regrets her first tattoo she got when she was 18 years old. In 2012, Levy made her first television debut on MTV's Guy Code as a guest host. In 2013, Tran was involved in a controversial music video called "Asian Girlz" created by Day Above Ground. Tran quickly apologized for the music video, stating: “I sincerely apologize to all who feels that I set Asian women back 50 yrs. I know I lost respect from a lot of ppl [sic]. It wasn't my intention. [...] It was meant to be light hearted and fun. Satirical. They are sweet boys and not at all racist. That is all I will say. I'm sorry once again.”

In 2015, Levy played the role of the race starter in Furious 7. She was later voted as one of the most beautiful women of the Fast & Furious franchise. She later went on to have appearances on the television series Jungle Justice in 2015, and later starred in the films Female Fight Squad and The Unwilling. Tran went on to appear in several other television series, including playing Lip's sex partner and coworker Eddie in season 8 of Shameless. Levy then went on to play the role of Roenick in the 2018 film The First Purge and also appeared as Trish Park in the 2018 Netflix series The Haunting of Hill House.

Levy was cast to play operative Desiree "Desi" Nguyen in the final eight episodes for season three of MacGyver in 2019. Tran said that she enjoys her role as Desi, and was excited for season four. In June 2019, Tran was officially confirmed as a main cast member for season four of MacGyver.

== Personal life ==
Tran is very dedicated to her fitness. Tran has also stated "I want to start a movement of new age housewives where you have women with dyed hair, piercings, and tattoos who are very traditional in a household kind of setting." Tran is known to be a dog lover, and she has owned a Basset Hound named Carlos since 2013.

== Filmography ==
=== Film ===
Year	Title	Role	Notes
2015	Furious 7	Race Starter	
2016	Vigilante Diaries	Kid 2.0	
2016	Female Fight Squad	Lisa	
2016	The Unwilling	Nurse Không May	
2017	Gemini	Thiri	
2017	Mad Genius	Nicola	
2018	The First Purge	Roenick	
2018	The Silk Road	Haruko	
2020	Two Ways to Go West	Addy	
2022	Secret Headquarters	Virginia	
2023	Expend4bles	Lash	

=== Television ===
Year	Title	Role	Notes
2012	Guy Code	Herself	
2015	Jungle Justice	Vy	
2015	Chosen Kin	Mya	
2016	Confessions of a Hollywood Bartender	Stephanie	
2017	Animal Kingdom	Christie	
2017	Chosen Kin Origins	Mya	
2017–2018	Shameless	Eddie	Recurring; 8 episodes
2018	Chosen Kin Origins: New Breed	Mya	
2018	The Haunting of Hill House	Trish Park	Recurring; 4 episodes
2019–2021	MacGyver	Desiree "Desi" Nguyen	Recurring (season 3); Main cast (season 4–5)
2022	Magnum P.I.	Tia Min	Episode: "Dead Man Walking"
2025	S.W.A.T.	Maya	Episode: "Exploited"
