= List of MacGyver episodes =

List of MacGyver episodes, MacGyver (season #), or List of MacGyver episodes (season #) may refer to:

- List of MacGyver (1985 TV series) episodes
  - MacGyver (1985 TV series, season 1)
  - MacGyver (1985 TV series, season 2)
  - MacGyver (1985 TV series, season 3)
  - MacGyver (1985 TV series, season 4)
  - MacGyver (1985 TV series, season 5)
  - MacGyver (1985 TV series, season 6)
  - MacGyver (1985 TV series, season 7)
- List of MacGyver (2016 TV series) episodes
  - MacGyver (2016 TV series, season 1)
  - MacGyver (2016 TV series, season 2)
  - MacGyver (2016 TV series, season 3)
  - MacGyver (2016 TV series, season 4)
  - MacGyver (2016 TV series, season 5)
