= List of MacGyver characters =

There were several recurring characters in the 1985 television series MacGyver and its 2016 reboot.

MacGyver's producers had a tendency to use an actor in multiple roles throughout the series. Several recurring characters were added throughout the series run, appearing as guest-stars in the opening credits.

== Overview ==
Character	Portrayed by	Seasons												
Character	Portrayed by	Original								Reboot				
Character	Portrayed by	1	2	3	4	5	6	7	TV films	1	2	3	4	5
Angus MacGyver	Richard Dean Anderson	Main	Main	Main	Main	Main	Main	Main	Main					
Angus MacGyver	Lucas Till									Main	Main	Main	Main	Main
Jack Dalton	Bruce McGill		Recurring	Recurring	Recurring	Recurring		R						
Jack Dalton	George Eads									Main (Note: George Eads is credited as a series regular from 1x1 through 3x14 of the reboot.)	Main	Main		
Riley Davis	Tristin Mays									Main	Main	Main	Main	Main
Wilt Bozer	Robin Mossely					R	R							
Wilt Bozer	Justin Hires									Main	Main	Main	Main	Main
Matty Webber	Meredith Eaton									Main (Note: Meredith Eaton is credited as a series regular from 1x18, of the reboot, onwards. From 1x13 through 1x17, of the reboot, she is credited as a recurring guest star.)	Main	Main	Main	Main
Peter Thornton / Patricia Thornton	Dana Elcar	R	Main	Main	Main	Main	Main	Main						
Peter Thornton / Patricia Thornton	Sandrine Holt									M (Note: Sandrine Holt is credited as a series regular from 1x01 through 1x12 of the reboot.)				
Samantha Cage	Isabel Lucas										M (Note: Isabel Lucas is credited as a series regular from 2x01 through 2x13, of the reboot, and only in the episodes she appears in.)			
Desiree "Desi" Nguyen	Levy Tran											R	Main	Main
Russell "Russ/Rusty" Taylor	Henry Ian Cusick												Main	Main
Recurring cast
Nikki Carpenter	Elyssa Davalos			R										
Nikki Carpenter	Tracy Spiridakos									R				
Dennis "Murdoc"	Michael Des Barres		Recurring	Recurring	Recurring	Recurring	Recurring	Recurring						
Dennis "Murdoc"	David Dastmalchian									Recurring	Recurring	Recurring		G
Jill Morgan	Kate Bond									G	R	G		
Billy Colton	Cuba Gooding Jr.					R		R						
Billy Colton	Lance Gross									Guest	Guest	R		
Cassandra Glover	Lauren Vélez										R			
Leanna Martin	Reign Edwards										Recurring	Recurring		
Elwood Davis	William Baldwin										R	G		
James MacGyver/"Oversight"	Martin Milner					G								
James MacGyver/"Oversight"	Tate Donovan										G	Recurring	Recurring	
Parker	Alexandra Grey													R

== Main characters ==
=== MacGyver ===
Portrayed by Richard Dean Anderson in original, Lucas Till in 2016 reboot

MacGyver is a troubleshooter who prefers non-violent conflict resolution wherever possible. He refuses to carry or use a gun due to a childhood accident with a revolver that resulted in the death of a friend. MacGyver is an outspoken advocate of gun control, as well as a supporter of environmental preservation, racial equality, and assisting the poor. Even in cases where his improvised devices are used to attack hostile opponents, he is always doing so in self-defense and, if possible, subduing or disabling rather than killing. He is often suspicious of militaristic attitudes within the government; he sees his Phoenix Foundation employer as an alternative to the more conventional (and violent) means of law enforcement.

In the 2016 reboot, MacGyver is a U.S. operative who works for the Phoenix Foundation, a covert agency operating under the guise of a think tank. Trained as an Explosive Ordnance Disposal technician for the Army, he prefers to use non-lethal means to stop his enemies. Mac spends the majority of the first and second seasons searching for his father James, who abandoned him as a child shortly after losing his mother. He eventually finds him in the season 2 finale, where he learns James has been watching over him all his life, and is now his boss codenamed 'Oversight'. Unable to work for people he doesn't trust, Mac quits the Phoenix and refuses to rejoin as he cannot trust his father. Maddy convinces James to quit, which leads Mac to rejoin.

=== Peter Thornton/Patricia Thornton ===
Peter Thornton portrayed by Dana Elcar in original; Patricia Thornton portrayed by Sandrine Holt in 2016 reboot

Peter Thornton (portrayed by Dana Elcar) is MacGyver's boss and best friend. Pete is divorced from Connie Thornton (portrayed by Linda Darlow). Pete is an operative at the Department of External Services (DXS) which is where he is impressed by Mac's ingenuity while tracking down Murdoc, an international assassin. When Pete takes the position of Director of Operations at the Phoenix Foundation several years later, he brings MacGyver into the program. In addition to sending Mac out on various tasks for the Foundation, Pete is many times forced to bail MacGyver out of the trouble he gets into. Pete has a son, Michael, who has always been resentful that he was never around when he was growing up. In the sixth season Thorton begins going blind as a result of glaucoma. (Elcar was diagnosed with glaucoma.)

In 2016 reboot, Patricia Thornton is an ex-field agent & director of operations for the Department of External Services and Phoenix Foundation. In the 12th episode, "Screwdriver", she is discovered to be a mole working for the Organization and arrested.

=== Jack Dalton ===
Portrayed by Bruce McGill in original as recurring, by George Eads in 2016 reboot as main

In the original series, Jack is an aviator and old friend of MacGyver's with a weakness for get-rich-quick schemes that invariably get both of them into trouble. He always wears a peaked cap and his left eye twitches when he is lying.

In the 2016 reboot, Jack Dalton (played by former CSI star George Eads) is Mac's partner in the field and a former Delta Force soldier and CIA operative. Jack's history with Mac goes back to his days in the Army and unlike Mac, he is not afraid to use guns in the field. He also has history with Riley, because he was once in a relationship with her mother and had an altercation with her abusive father. While mostly easy-going and laid-back, Jack can get serious when the situation calls for it and often calls upon his special forces training to help the team get out of a tight spot.

- Actor Bruce McGill guested in the reboot series as Detective Greer in episode 2x11 "Bullet + Pen".

=== Wilt Bozer ===
Portrayed by Robin Mossley in original as recurring, by Justin Hires in 2016 reboot as main

In the original series, Wilt Bozer appears in a handful of episodes of Season 5 and 6: "Serenity", "The Lost Amadeus", "Hearts of Steel", and "MacGyver's Women".

In the 2016 reboot, Wilt Bozer is an aspiring filmmaker, prosthetic makeup artist, and MacGyver's best friend and roommate. At first, he doesn't know about MacGyver's real job. Bozer later joins the Phoenix Foundation after discovering MacGyver's secret, and uses his talents to create lifelike masks and facial prosthetics as well as a humanoid robot.

=== Riley Davis ===
Portrayed by Tristin Mays in 2016 reboot as main

A computer systems expert and skilled hacker recruited by Phoenix Foundation. She was in a Super Max prison for hacking the National Security Agency. Davis was recommended to Director Thorton by Jack Dalton, one of her mother's boyfriends due to Nikki Carpenter being allegedly killed in action. Her sentence was cut short by request of the DXS and continued working with the Phoenix.

=== Matt Webber/Matilda Webber ===
Portrayed by Madison Mason in original (one episode), by Meredith Eaton in 2016 reboot as main

Matt Webber was a field operative who replaced Pete in "Early Retirement". At the end of the episode it was revealed that he was working against Pete.

Matilda "Matty" Webber is the new Director of Operations at Phoenix Foundation and Jack's ex-boss at the CIA. She takes over after Patricia Thornton is outed and arrested.

=== Samantha Cage ===
Portrayed by Isabel Lucas in 2016 reboot as main

Samantha Cage is a CIA officer and formerly SASR 4th Squadron. After she is discharged from the CIA for her unsanctioned actions to save a MIA SEAL, in the second-season premiere, Matty recruits her into the Phoenix Foundation.

=== Desiree "Desi" Nguyen ===
Portrayed by Levy Tran in 2016 reboot as recurring (season 3) and main (seasons 4 and 5)

Desi Nguyen is the Phoenix Foundation's newest agent, who uses her skills to protect MacGyver and his team on their global missions. She replaced Jack Dalton as the team's muscle.

=== Russell "Russ" Taylor ===
Portrayed by Henry Ian Cusick in 2016 reboot as main

Russ Taylor is an Ex-MI6 Agent-Turned-Private Military Contractor described as a master manipulator and salesman, Russ is skilled in propaganda and lie detection, and boasts an extremely high emotional intelligence. He is also very wealthy, and thus is used to both getting his way and enjoying the spoils of war (including expensive suits, fast cars, private jets and a house in Monte Carlo).

== Recurring characters in both series ==
=== Murdoc ===
Murdoc (portrayed by Michael Des Barres) is MacGyver's most frequent opponent. He is a master assassin who never fails—except when MacGyver gets involved. Murdoc is a master of disguise, as well as highly skilled and creative in the use of booby traps. Murdoc's signature for each hit is to take photographs of his victims at the moment of their deaths. His first appearance in the series is presented as his second run-in with MacGyver. Murdoc returns for revenge for their first encounter—to the surprise of MacGyver, as Murdoc had apparently been killed. Murdoc's revenge scheme not only fails, but results in him apparently being killed again. This became a recurring theme: each of Murdoc's subsequent appearances ends in another apparently certain "death", which he incredibly survives, to return in a later episode.

In the 2016 reboot, Murdoc (played by David Dastmalchian) is a hired hitman known as Suspect 218 to the CIA whose targets are enemies and MacGyver. After being captured by the Phoenix Foundation in season 1, in season 2 he escapes and becomes obsessed in finding his lost son, Casian. Michael Des Barres, who played Murdoc in the original series, plays Murdoc's mentor, Nicholas Helman, in the reboot.

=== Nikki Carpenter ===
Nikki Carpenter (portrayed by Elyssa Davalos) joins the Phoenix Foundation in the third season. She often has differences of opinion with MacGyver, although the two eventually come to respect each other as professionals.

In the 2016 reboot, the character (played by Tracy Spiridakos) is a former agent for the DXS and MacGyver's former girlfriend who went rogue but later revealed to be an undercover agent for the CIA.

=== Harry Jackson ===
Harry Jackson (portrayed by John Anderson) is MacGyver's grandfather, who helped raise MacGyver after his grandmother and father were killed in a car accident when MacGyver was aged nine. Seven years later, Harry left MacGyver to work in Alaska, sending money to MacGyver and his mother. At this time, MacGyver and Harry lost contact, but beginning in season one, MacGyver and Harry meet again, after eighteen years without contact, in the episode "Target MacGyver", in which MacGyver and his grandfather work together to defeat an assassin named Axminster (D'Mitch Davis). Harry appears in the five episodes "Target MacGyver" (season 1), "Phoenix Under Siege", "Friends" (both season 2) "Passages" (season 5) and "Harry's Will" (season 6). Harry dies of a heart attack in the fifth-season finale episode "Passages".

In the 2016 reboot, the character (played by Michael O'Keefe) first appears in a flashback in the fourth episode of season 2.

=== Coltons ===
The Coltons (portrayed by Della Reese, Cleavon Little, Richard Lawson, and Cuba Gooding Jr.) are a family of bounty hunters (Mama Colton, Frank, Jesse and Billy), introduced one at a time—the only episode in which more than one appears is their collective final appearance in the final season, on which occasion they (and their bulldog, Frog) took over the episode entirely, relegating MacGyver to a cameo appearance. This episode, called "The Coltons", was actually intended as a backdoor pilot for a spin-off starring the Coltons, but ABC network officials decided that series would not be picked up.

In the 2016 reboot, they are played by Sheryl Lee Ralph, Lance Gross, Javicia Leslie, & Jermaine Rivers and first appear in the first-season episode 16, "Hook", when they get the upper hand on Mac and Jack several times, until a Foundation team retrieves the fugitive from them. Mac, Jack, Bozer & Riley end up saving the Coltons' lives from their criminal employers. They reappear in the second-season episode "Riley + Airplane", after which Billy Colton (Gross) becomes Riley's love interest.

=== Charlie Robinson ===
Charlie Robinson (portrayed by Steven Williams) is MacGyver's Army Bomb disposal EOD Specialist with EOD Tech Specialist MacGyver sent by DXS to work with him. He appears in Episode: "Countdown"

In the 2016 reboot, he is portrayed by Emerson Brooks as an old friend of EOD Tech Specialist MacGyver; he's another EOD Specialist in Army Bomb disposal. He appears in season 1: Episode: "Wrench", season 2: Episode: "Mac & Jack" & Season 3: Episodes: "Revenge + Catacombs + Le Fantome" and "Mason + Cable + Choices".

=== Penny Parker ===
Penny Parker (portrayed by Teri Hatcher): Penny Parker and MacGyver meet in line at an airport in Bulgaria when she tries to smuggle some jewels out of the country in his pocket. With little talent, but big dreams, her pursuit of a show business career gets her into trouble more than once; she was once used by Murdoc as an unwitting pawn in an attempt to eliminate MacGyver. She was also the spitting image of her late aunt Betty Parker, who was murdered in 1958 by her boyfriend, and was suffering from lead poisoning., Like the somewhat impulsive identically named female-sleuth character of author Mildred Benson, Penny isn't exactly stupid, but she tends to act without thinking things through, and has only a shaky grasp of how the world works. Thus, the long-suffering MacGyver often has to bail Penny out of trouble and otherwise assist her in handling life situations.

In the 2016 reboot, she's played by Bianca Malinowski.

=== Jimmy MacGyver ===
James "Jimmy" MacGyver is MacGyver's father. He is portrayed by Martin Milner in the original series.

In the 2016 reboot, where he is portrayed by Tate Donovan, he is Angus' long lost father. After losing his wife and Angus' mother, James abandoned his family not long after, leaving Angus in the care of his grandfather. It is revealed in the season 2 finale that the unseen and enigmatic head of the Phoenix Foundation (and every name it went by before this) codenamed 'Oversight' is in fact James: a fact Angus learns when Matty forces a face-to-face meeting when Angus quits the Phoenix. James reveals that he left his family to protect Angus from the enemies he'd made around the world, many of whom wouldn't hesitate endangering a child's life, but also because the pain of losing his wife made James scared of what he might do around Angus.

== Recurring characters only in original series ==
- Helen Wilson (portrayed by Susan Chapple): Pete Thornton's secretary. Episodes – The Odd Triple, The Spoilers, Rock the Cradle, Cleo Rocks, The Battle of Tommy Giordano, Blind Faith, and Strictly Business
- Willis (portrayed by Bruce Harwood): Episodes – The Wall, The Wasteland, Trail of Tears, and Hind-Sight
- Maria Romburg (portrayed by Brigitta Stenberg): Maria appears in the sixth season initially to scam a friend of MacGyver's. She changes sides, joins the Phoenix Foundation, and becomes a love interest of MacGyver.
- Mei Jan (portrayed by Michele Chan) (initially calling herself Sue Ling):is MacGyver's foster daughter who enlists MacGyver's help in completing her mission for the Chinese student movement. She later reveals that the real Sue Ling was killed in the Tiananmen Square protests of 1989.
- Cynthia Wilson (portrayed by Roxanne Reese): Introduced with her husband Booker (Michael D. Roberts) in "The Challenge", Cynthia runs the Challenger's Club, a program for troubled inner-city teens. In episodes where MacGyver tries to help runaways or other youths, he invariably sends them to the Challenger's Club as a safe haven.
- Lisa Woodman (portrayed by Mayim Bialik): is a young girl who MacGyver originally meets at a Swiss boarding school in the episode "Cease Fire", where she accidentally loses his trusty Swiss Army knife. She later returns in two more episodes, "Hearts of Steel" and "Twenty Questions", the latter involving Mac helping her overcome an alcohol abuse problem.
- Mike Kiley (portrayed by Jackson Davies): Episodes – Twenty Questions, The Wall, and Lesson in Evil
- Mama Lorraine (portrayed by Kimberly Scott): is a voodoo priestess. She appears in episodes The Hood, The Prometheus Syndrome and Walking Dead.

== Recurring characters from the 2016 reboot ==
- Sarah Adler (portrayed by Amy Acker): Jack's former partner and ex-girlfriend from the CIA.
- Jill Morgan (portrayed by Kate Bond): A forensics expert at the Phoenix Foundation. She was killed by Murdoc.
- Leanna Martin (portrayed by Reign Edwards): A recruit whom Bozer meets and becomes good friends and later starts a relationship with at the Operative Training Center. It is later revealed she had been allegedly killed during an undercover CIA op.
- Cassandra Glover (portrayed by Lauren Vélez): a coordinator for Operative Training Center.
- Elwood Davis (portrayed by William Baldwin): Riley's estranged father.
- Gwendolyn "Gwen" Hayes (portrayed by Jeri Ryan): MacGyver's Aunt and his Mother's Sister; an ex-DXS agent who was presumed dead; head of Codex.
- Zoe Kimura (portrayed by Amy Okuda): MacGyver falls in love with her, she and 31 other students get trapped in a room filled with water and sadly drowns.
