= Mayim Bialik =

American actress, television personality, and author (born 1975)

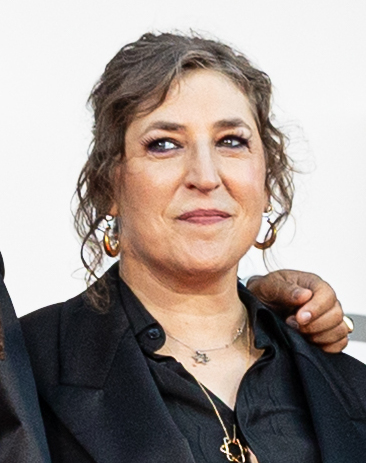
- Bialik at the 82nd Venice International Film Festival in 2025
- Born: Mayim Chaya Bialik; December 12, 1975 (age 50); San Diego, California, U.S.
- Education: University of California, Los Angeles (B.S., Ph.D.)
- Occupations: Actress; author
- Years active: 1987–present
- Spouse: Michael Stone (m. 2003; div. 2013)
- Children: 2
- Scientific career
- Fields: Neuroscience
- Thesis: Hypothalamic Regulation in Relation to Maladaptive, Obsessive-Compulsive, Affiliative, and Satiety Behaviors in Prader-Willi Syndrome (2007)
- Website: groknation.com

Mayim Chaya Bialik (/ˈmaɪɪm biˈɑːlɪk/ MY-im bee-AH-lik; born December 12, 1975) is an American actress and former game show host. From 1991 to 1995, she played the title character of the NBC sitcom Blossom. From 2010 to 2019, she played neuroscientist Amy Farrah Fowler on the CBS sitcom The Big Bang Theory, for which she was nominated four times for the Primetime Emmy Award for Outstanding Supporting Actress in a Comedy Series and won the Critics' Choice Television Award for Best Supporting Actress in a Comedy Series in 2015 and 2017. Bialik shared hosting duties of Jeopardy! with Ken Jennings on a rotating basis between August 2021 and December 2023.

== Early life and education ==
Mayim Chaya Bialik was born on December 12, 1975, in San Diego, California, to Beverly (née Winkleman) and Barry Bialik. Her family were Jewish immigrants who lived in the Bronx, New York City. Three of her four grandparents migrated from Poland, Czechoslovakia, and Hungary. After being raised as a Reform Jew, she described herself as Modern Orthodox Jewish in 2013. Bialik became a bat mitzvah and has called herself a "staunch Zionist". Her name, Mayim ("water" in Hebrew), originates in a family nickname for her great-grandmother, Miriam. The Hebrew-language poet Hayim Nahman Bialik was her great-great-great-granduncle.

Bialik graduated in 1993 from North Hollywood High School in Los Angeles, California. In acknowledgment of her acting commitments, she was granted a deferred acceptance and attended University of California, Los Angeles (UCLA). She earned a Bachelor of Science (B.S.) degree in neuroscience, with minors in Hebrew and Jewish studies, in 2000.

Bialik has said she did not have the grades needed for medical school. She went on to study for a doctorate in neuroscience. She took a break from studies in 2005 to return to acting. She returned to earn her Doctor of Philosophy (Ph.D.) degree in neuroscience from UCLA in 2007. Her dissertation was titled "Hypothalamic regulation in relation to maladaptive, obsessive-compulsive, affiliative and satiety behaviors in Prader–Willi syndrome". Bialik has publicly discussed having obsessive-compulsive disorder, which first became apparent during her childhood.

== Career ==
=== 1987–2009: Child actress and other roles ===
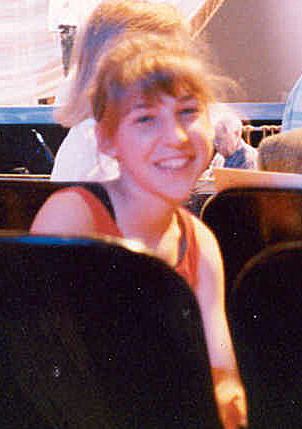
Bialik at the rehearsal for the 1989 Academy Awards

Bialik started her career as a child actress in the late 1980s. Her early roles included the 1988 horror film Pumpkinhead (her first acting job) and guest appearances on The Facts of Life (two final-season episodes) and Beauty and the Beast. In 1988 to 1989, she appeared in eight episodes of the sitcom Webster as Frieda, Webster's classmate. It was for Beauty and the Beast, where she played a sewer-dwelling girl named Ellie (with about ten lines of dialogue) that she obtained her Screen Actors Guild (SAG) card. Bialik appeared in three episodes of MacGyver as Lisa Woodman. She appeared in Beaches (1988), playing Bette Midler's character as a young girl. Many reviews singled out her performance as a strong point in the film. She appeared in the music video for Michael Jackson's song "Liberian Girl". In 1990, she was tied to two television pilots, Fox's Molloy and NBC's Blossom. Molloy produced six episodes for a tryout run, followed by the shooting of the pilot special for Blossom. The latter aired two weeks before the Fox series and garnered higher ratings. When Molloy folded after its six episodes, Blossom premiered as a mid-season replacement on January 3, 1991, and aired until May 22, 1995.

Bialik also made a guest appearance as a fictionalized version of herself in the series Saving Grace. In 2009, Clinton Kelly nominated her for a makeover on TLC's What Not to Wear.

=== 2010–2019: The Big Bang Theory ===
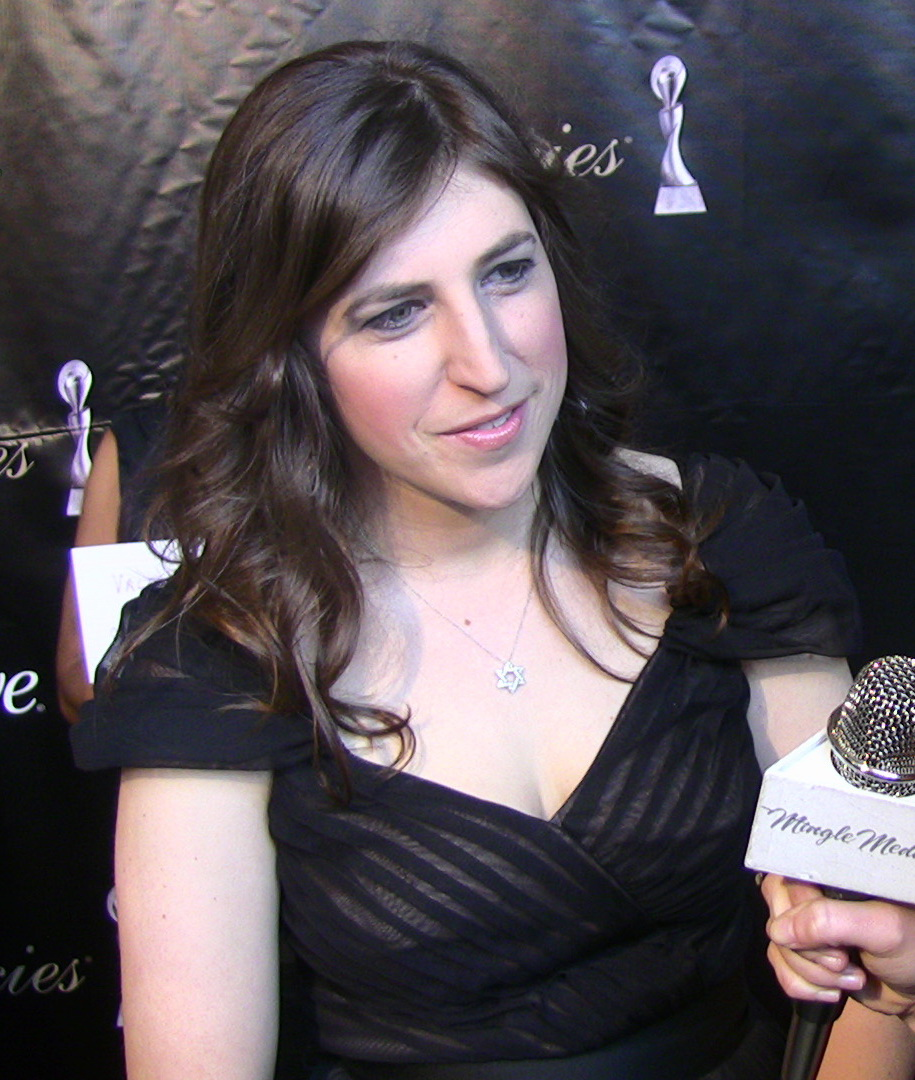
Bialik at the 36th Annual Gracie Awards in 2011

She joined the cast of The Big Bang Theory as Dr. Amy Farrah Fowler in 2010. Her first appearance was in the season 3 finale as a potential love interest for the character of Sheldon Cooper (played by Jim Parsons). In season 4, her character gained a recurring status as Sheldon's "friend that's a girl, but not a girlfriend." Beginning with the 8th episode of season 4, she became part of the main cast. Amy is a neurobiologist, a field that is related to Bialik's real-life doctorate in neuroscience. Bialik's performance in The Big Bang Theory earned her Emmy Award nominations in 2012, 2013, 2014, and 2015 for Outstanding Supporting Actress in a Comedy Series. Bialik was one of seven actresses who had a "quirky" personality to audition for the role. She is one of the guest stars on the 2014 Steve Carell improvisational sketch show Riot.

In August 2014, Bialik began hosting a revival of Candid Camera on TV Land alongside Peter Funt. In 2019, Bialik appeared in a commercial for IBM. On August 20, 2019, it was announced that she and her new production company, Sad Clown Productions, had signed exclusive contracts with Warner Bros. Entertainment. Mackenzie Gabriel-Vaught, a former executive at Chuck Lorre Productions, is Sad Clown's head of development. Sad Clown Productions, in conjunction with Jim Parsons's That's Wonderful Productions, BBC Studios, and Miranda Hart, executive-produces a starring vehicle for Bialik, Call Me Kat, based on the British series Miranda. A co-production of Warner Bros. and Fox Entertainment, it premiered on Fox on January 3, 2021, and was renewed for a second season in May 2021.

During her time on The Big Bang Theory, Bialik wrote two books: 2012's Beyond the Sling is about attachment parenting, while 2014's Mayim's Vegan Table contains over 100 of Bialik's vegan recipes. Her third book, 2017's Girling Up, is about the struggles of and ways in which girls grow up, showing the scientific ways in which their bodies change. Its successor, Boying Up (2018) analyzes the science, anatomy, and mentality of growing up as a boy, and the physical and mental changes and challenges boys face while transitioning from adolescence to adulthood.

=== 2021–2023: Jeopardy! host and directorial debut ===
From May 31 to June 11, 2021, Bialik was a guest host of Jeopardy! On August 11, 2021, it was announced that she would host the series' future primetime specials and spinoffs. When executive producer Mike Richards resigned as host after one week, it was announced that Bialik would guest-host the show for three weeks. Her contract was extended to seven weeks; she would then alternate with Ken Jennings for the rest of the calendar year. On December 8, 2021, it was announced that Bialik and Jennings would continue to host the show for the rest of the 2021–22 season. On July 27, 2022, it was announced that Bialik and Jennings would be the show's permanent hosts in a job-sharing arrangement.

In May 2023, it was announced that Bialik would temporarily leave Jeopardy! and would not serve as host for the rest of season 39 due to her support of the 2023 Writers Guild of America strike. Ken Jennings hosted the remainder of season 39 during Bialik's absence. In December 2023, it was announced that she would no longer host the syndicated version of Jeopardy! Despite this, the show was still open to having her host the prime-time specials and spin-offs. Michael Davies, the executive producer of the show, told Rolling Stone in January 2025 that "Mayim, which was absolutely her right, elected not to cross the picket line during the [SAG-AFTRA] strike. And as Ken got more reps, I think he got better and he earned the job." Bialik teased a potential return to the franchise four months prior.

Bialik wrote and directed her first film, As They Made Us (2022), about a divorced mom juggling her family's needs and her own quest for love. Dustin Hoffman and Candice Bergen starred as well as Simon Helberg, Bialik's former The Big Bang Theory castmate. The film was expected to premiere in late 2020, but the COVID-19 pandemic delayed filming. Ash Christian was attached to the project, but died in August 2020. Principal photography began in June 2021. The film was released on April 8, 2022.

In May 2023, Bialik competed as a contestant on an episode of Celebrity Wheel of Fortune against Vanna White and Ken Jennings. Bialik won $62,200 for Mental Wealth Alliance.

== Advocacy and activism ==
=== Grok Nation ===
Bialik founded Grok Nation (originally styled "GrokNation") in August 2015 to facilitate conversations among people of different ages and backgrounds about issues. It aimed to engage readers in online conversations that led to offline action, mobilizing them to change the world as a community. To grok means to understand in a profound manner. (The term comes from the 1961 science fiction novel Stranger in a Strange Land by Robert A. Heinlein.) Bialik had written on a similar idea for Jewish Telegraphic Agency–affiliated Jewish parenting site Kveller for five years. She announced and described her new creation on Kveller.

Along with former Sassy writer and editor Christina Kelly, Bialik relaunched Grok Nation as a women's lifestyle site in March 2018. The site ceased updates in March 2019, with new content shifting to Bialik's email newsletter.

=== Support of Israel ===
Bialik identifies as "unapologetically Zionist" and often advocates for Israel on social media. She identifies as a liberal Zionist and has stated that her liberal values do not contradict her Zionism. She has stated that she has family who live on a kibbutz as well as family who are religious Zionists and live in Israeli settlements in the West Bank.

During the 2014 Gaza war, Bialik donated money to the Israel Defense Forces (IDF) for armored vests. In a 2018 keynote address at the Global Forum for Combating Antisemitism, she stated that her support for Israel has led to attacks against her on social media, including calls to boycott her and The Big Bang Theory.

After the 2023 October 7 attacks, Bialik posted frequently in support of the IDF and the Israeli hostages. That month, she falsely claimed that pro-Palestinian protesters at the University of California, Los Angeles were calling for a "Jewish genocide"; the protesters were actually chanting, "Israel, Israel, you can't hide: We charge you with genocide". In late 2023, Bialik appeared in several videos with Noa Tishby in which they rejected calls for a ceasefire in the Gaza war.

In January 2024, PEN America was criticized for co-sponsoring an event hosted by Bialik. The event was protested by Writers Against the War on Gaza. About 500 authors signed a letter condemning PEN America for removing Randa Jarrar while she was protesting the event. In February 2024, Bialik also posted a video of herself laughing at Dan Ahdoot's comedy routine about the Israeli–Palestinian conflict. Social media users, including David Ehrlich and David Krumholtz, accused Bialik of trivializing the conflict.

Bialik has signed open letters by the pro-Israel group Creative Community for Peace (CCFP), including an October 2023 letter condemning Hamas and calling for the release of hostages taken by Hamas, a 2025 letter condemning a boycott of Israeli film institutions by Film Workers for Palestine and a 2026 letter rejecting accusations that Israel is committing genocide in Gaza. In September 2024, Bialik signed an open letter by StopAntisemitism, StandWithUs, End Jew Hatred and 2024 New Voices urging the Biden administration to "protect and support" Israel and secure the release of the hostages.

=== Veganism ===
Bialik is a vegan and a founding member of the Shamayim V'Aretz Institute, a Jewish organization that advocates the ethical treatment of animals. She stopped eating meat at age 19, and later became vegan after reading Jonathan Safran Foer's 2009 book, Eating Animals.

In 2012, in response to recent safety recalls of salmon and beef products, Bialik appeared in a still-image ad for the animal-rights activist group People for the Ethical Treatment of Animals (PETA). The ad featured Bialik in a 1950s-style house dress and apron, holding a piece of meat over an open trash can. The ad's caption read, "The only way to be sure that meat doesn't poison your family is to throw it out. Protect your families (and animals!) now by choosing vegan." In a promotional interview, Bialik told PETA she felt guilty eating meat earlier in life and did not realize there was another option at the time. She also claimed she had not contracted any sinus infections or needed to take any antibiotics since cutting dairy products out of her diet. In April 2025, Bialik collaborated with PETA to promote vegan alternatives to traditional Passover foods made from or with animal products.

In 2017, Bialik announced that she and vegan chef Ali Cruddas had opened Bodhi Bowl, a vegan restaurant in Los Angeles. It closed permanently in 2020 due to the COVID-19 pandemic.

=== The New York Times op-ed on Harvey Weinstein ===
After the Harvey Weinstein sexual misconduct allegations surfaced, Bialik wrote a New York Times op-ed in 2017 in which she described the entertainment industry as one "that profits on the exploitation of women ... [and] the objectification of women". With regard to protecting herself from sexual harassment, Bialik wrote that she dressed modestly and did not act flirtatiously with men, adding, "In a perfect world, women should be free to act however they want. But our world isn't perfect. Nothing—absolutely nothing—excuses men for assaulting or abusing women. But we can't be naïve about the culture we live in." Bialik's article drew backlash from critics who said she was insinuating that modesty and a conservative wardrobe can guard one against sexual assault. Patricia Arquette tweeted, "I have to say I was dressed non-provocatively at 12 walking home from school when men masturbated at me. It's not the clothes." In response, Bialik said she regretted that the piece "became what it became" and participated in a Facebook Live event hosted by The New York Times to answer questions about it.

=== Vaccination ===
==== Initial statements ====
In a 2009 interview, Bialik said of her family: "We are a non-vaccinating family, but I make no claims about people's individual decisions. We based ours on research and discussions with our pediatrician, and we've been happy with that decision, but obviously there's a lot of controversy about it."

==== Beyond the Sling ====
In 2012, Bialik's book, Beyond the Sling, was published, in which she discussed the attachment parenting movement and once again stated that she and her spouse had decided not to vaccinate their children. The book was co-edited by pediatrician and anti-vaccine activist Robert Sears.

In a May 2012 criticism of the book, Wired columnist Marziah Karch accused Bialik of "freeloading on the system and weakening it at the same time" by relying on herd immunity to protect her children when they had no medical reason to forgo vaccines. Karch also labeled Bialik a "Typhoid Mary" and pointed out that her children's pediatrician was anti-vaccine activist Jay Gordon. Gordon, who wrote the introduction for Beyond the Sling and contributed to Bialik's 2014 cookbook, has falsely claimed that vaccines cause autism. In her column, Karch also claimed that anti-vaccine beliefs were common within the attachment parenting movement.

In a Kveller column published later in May 2012—which Karch assumed was a response to her own piece—Bialik stated that neither the attachment parenting movement at large nor the nonprofit Attachment Parenting International took any stance regarding the vaccination of children. She also said she would not engage with anyone who brought up the death of a child when criticizing attachment parenting, stating:

It's disrespectful to families who have lost children for me to defend myself, since responding with, "My friend's brother had an adverse reaction to a vaccination and he is never going to develop mentally past the age of 6 because of it," seems really tacky and insensitive and wrong (even if it's true).

In her column, Bialik further stated, "And to the vaccine proponents who think I have ever told anyone what to do with their children: I'm not biting," and, "Here's a nibble, though (sigh): Children today get about four times as many vaccines as the average 35-year-old did when we were kids." Bialik ended the piece by saying she relied on the information found on the Centers for Disease Control and Prevention website when researching vaccines, as well as the 2007 edition of The Parents' Concise Guide to Childhood Vaccinations by Lauren Feder and the 2011 edition of The Vaccine Book by Sears (both anti-vaccine texts).

==== Later statements and public scrutiny ====
In February 2015, Bialik stated on social media and Kveller that her children had been vaccinated and she was not anti-vaccine. She implied she was motivated to "clea[r] things up" by the "anger" and "hysteria" surrounding her previous public statements. The following day, Bialik added:

Honestly, people. Do your research. Do what's right for you. Let me live my life and you live yours. No one gets to know the timeline of my kids' medical appointments because they are not celebrities and they are not your property. Put me on the altar if you have nothing better to do today, but just be happy with your decisions and leave my kids alone. My job is not in jeopardy. Everything is fine, except in the clearly supportive and loving world of social media and gossip. Have a fantastic day everyone.

In October 2020, amid the COVID-19 pandemic, Bialik said that though she had not received a vaccination in 30 years, she planned to be vaccinated against both the flu and the SARS-CoV-2 virus and that, "As of today, my children may not have had every one of the vaccinations that your children have, but my children are vaccinated." Bialik also stated, "Now, do I think we give way too many vaccines in this country compared to when I was a vaccinated child? Yes," and said she believed there was a "tremendous profit" being made from the sale of vaccines.

When Bialik was chosen to guest-host Jeopardy! in 2021, her prior statements regarding vaccines, attachment parenting, and the Weinstein scandal (as well as her endorsement of the controversial nutritional supplement Neuriva) were widely discussed and debated by mainstream journalists and social-media users.

In April 2022, Bialik said her children were unvaccinated when Beyond the Sling was published, but had since been vaccinated according to a "delayed" vaccination schedule.

== Personal life ==
In 2014, Bialik was awarded an honorary Doctor of Humane Letters (L.H.D.) degree from Boston University. In June 2017, she sprained her vocal cords and was ordered by her ear, nose, and throat (ENT) specialist to avoid speaking for a month.

=== Marriage and family ===
Bialik married Michael Stone on August 31, 2003; they had a Victorian-themed ceremony that included traditional Jewish wedding customs. Stone, who was raised Mormon, but left the church as an adolescent, converted to Judaism to marry Bialik. They have two sons together. Bialik returned to television in 2010, as opposed to continuing her scientific career, so she could spend more time with her children. Bialik and Stone announced their divorce in November 2012, and it was finalized six months later.

=== Religious beliefs ===
In a 2012 interview, Bialik labeled herself "aspiring Modern Orthodox". She has also appeared in several YouTube cameos as Blossom and Amy Farrah Fowler, asking questions about Jewish beliefs. The videos are produced by Allison Josephs, Bialik's Judaism study partner, whom she met with the help of Partners in Torah. Bialik is a frequent contributor to the Jewish parenting website Kveller. In an October 2011 Kveller column, Bialik discussed having to work on the set of The Big Bang Theory during the Jewish holiday of Sukkot and how she adhered to halakha (Jewish religious law) as closely as possible while doing so. Bialik said she hired a non-Jewish driver to take her to set (as she was forbidden from driving a car, but not riding in it), abstained from using her phone and laptop, and dressed in fancy "shul" clothing she would normally wear to observe religious holidays or attend religious services. Bialik said that she one day hoped to be able to avoid filming on any Jewish holiday and described herself as a "Jew in exile" and "a happily employed actress." She also stated:

I wasn't sure if I should be so public about me working on the holiday, but I have never claimed to be perfect in observance, and I hope that by sharing ways I make observance fit my life, I can give someone else the support to know that it's it's not all or nothing as we learn and grow, that while we are on any particular path, we can still enjoy it even if it's not moving exactly where—or as fast as—we want it to.

In a March 2010 interview, Bialik said she had both her sons circumcised in traditional Jewish ceremonies, despite the practice being largely rejected within the West Coast-based "holistic and green" parenting circles she was a part of. In a May 2012 Kveller column responding to various unnamed critics, Bialik said that anti-circumcision activists had accused her of "worshiping a false god" and "mutilating and psychologically scarring [her] sons beyond repair".

== Filmography ==
=== Film ===
Year	Title	Role	Notes
1988	Beaches	Young Cecilia "CC" Carol Bloom	
1988	Pumpkinhead	Christine Wallace	
1990	The Kingdom Chums: Original Top Ten	Petey	Voice
2006	Kalamazoo?	Maggie Goldman	
2011	The Chicago 8	Nancy Kurshan	
2022	As They Made Us	—N/a	Director, writer and producer
2025	Like Father Like Son	Anabelle Weiss	
2025	Father Mother Sister Brother	Emily	

=== Television ===
Year	Title	Role	Notes
1987	Beauty and the Beast	Ellie	Episode: "No Way Down"
1988	The Facts of Life	Jennifer Cole	Episodes: "The Beginning of the End" and "The Beginning of the Beginning"
1988–1989	Webster	Frieda	Recurring role (Season 6)
1989–1990	Empty Nest	Laurie Kincaid	Episodes: "The R.N. Who Came to Dinner" and "Harry Knows Best"
1989–1990	MacGyver	Lisa Woodman	Recurring role (Season 5 and Season 6)
1990	Doogie Howser, M.D.	Candace	Episode: "Ask Dr. Doogie"
1990	Molloy	Molloy Martin	Lead role
1990	Murphy Brown	Natalie	Episode: "I Want My FYI"
1990	The Earth Day Special	Herself	Television special
1990–1995	Blossom	Blossom Russo	Lead role
1991	Sea World's Mother Earth Celebration	Herself	Television special
1992	Where in the World is Carmen Sandiego?	Herself	Guest role
1993	The Hidden Room	Jillie	Episode: "Jillie"
1994	Don't Drink the Water	Susan Hollander	Television film
1994–1995	The John Larroquette Show	Rachel	Episodes: "The Book of Rachel", "Rachel and Ton" and "Rachel Redux"
1995–1996	The Adventures of Hyperman	Brittany Bright	Voice; Main role
1996, 1999	Hey Arnold!	Maria	Voice; Episodes: "6th Grade Girls" and "Phoebe Skips"
1996	Aaahh!!! Real Monsters	Cindy	Voice; Episode: "Things That Go Bump in the Night"
1996	The Real Adventures of Jonny Quest	Lucy / Julia	Voice; Episodes: "Assault on Questworld" and "The Alchemist"
1997, 2000	Recess	Kirsten Kurst	Voice; 5 episodes
1997	Johnny Bravo	Tour Guide	Voice; Episode: "Going Batty"
1997	Extreme Ghostbusters	Girl in Future	Voice; Episode: "Ghost Apocalyptic Future"
1998	Welcome to Paradox	Rita	Episode: "Alien Jane"
2001–2002	Lloyd in Space	Mean Cindy	Voice; Recurring role (Season 1–2)
2003	7th Heaven	Cathy	Episode: "Dick"
2004	Kim Possible	Justine Flanner	Voice; Episode: "Partners"
2005	Katbot	Paula	Voice; Recurring role
2005	Fat Actress	Herself	Episode: "The Koi Effect" and "Holy Lesbo Batman"
2005, 2007	Curb Your Enthusiasm	Jodi Funkhouser	Episodes: "The Bowtie", "The Ida Funkhouser Roadside Memorial" and "The TiVo Guy"
2009	What Not to Wear	Herself	Episode: "Mayim"
2009	Saving Grace	Esther	Episode: "Mooooooooo"
2009	Bones	Genie Gormon	Episode: "The Cinderella in the Cardboard"
2009	'Til Death	Herself	Episodes: "The Break-Up", "Merit Play" and "Baby Steps"
2010	The Secret Life of the American Teenager	Dr. Wilameena Bink	Recurring role (Season 2–3)
2010	Who Wants to Be a Millionaire?	Herself / Expert	Season 8
2010–2019	The Big Bang Theory	Amy Farrah Fowler	Guest role (Season 3); Main role (Season 4–Season 12)
2011	The Dog Who Saved Halloween	Medusa	Voice; television film
2012	Survivor: One World	Herself/Attendant	Reality; Episode: "Reunion"
2014	Candid Camera	Host	Season 38
2014	Stan Lee's Mighty 7	Lady Lightning	Voice; Television film
2015	Blaze and the Monster Machines	Great Sphinx	Voice; Episode: "Race to the Top of the World"
2015	The Flight Before Christmas	Stephanie Michelle Hunt	Television film; also producer
2016	Star vs. the Forces of Evil	Willoughby	Voice; Episode: "Fetch"
2017	MasterChef Junior	Guest judge	Episode: "Batter Hurry Up"
2017	Rhett & Link's Buddy System	Glenda	Episode: "To Kill a Robot"
2017	Drop the Mic	Herself	Episode: "Mayim Bialik vs. Kunal Nayyar / Ashley Tisdale vs. Nick Lachey"
2020	Celebrity Show-Off	Herself	Host
2020	Lego Masters	Herself	Episode: "Space Smash"
2020	Match Game	Herself	Celebrity panel
2020	Vampirina	Dr. Gem Jeodopolis	Voice; Episode: "Fang Ten!/Science Rocks"
2020–2024	Young Sheldon	Amy Farrah Fowler	3 episodes (voice only in 2 episodes, live-action in "Memoir")
2021–2023	Call Me Kat	Kat	Main role; also executive producer
2021–2023	Jeopardy!	Herself	Host, 10 episodes syndicated (season 37), 115 episodes syndicated (season 38), 9 episodes ABC (season 38)
2022–2023	Celebrity Jeopardy!	Herself	Host (season 1)
2023	Celebrity Wheel of Fortune	Self – Celebrity Contestant	Episode: "Vanna White, Ken Jennings and Mayim Bialik"
2023	The Tiny Chef Show	Herself	Episode: "Tiny Chef's Marvelous Mish Mesh Special"
2025	Night Court	Herself	Episode: "Mayim Worst Enemy"
2026	Stuart Fails to Save the Universe	Amy Farrah Fowler	2 episodes

=== Web ===
Year	Title	Role	Notes
2013	Untitled Web Series About a Space Traveler Who Can Also Travel Through Time	B.O.O.T.H.	Voice; Episode: "Second Season Prequel"
2016	Yidlife Crisis	Chaya	Episode: "The Double Date"
2017	Rhett and Link's Buddy System	Pathologist	
2017–2018	Good Mythical Morning	Herself	Episodes: "What's On My Head?", "3 Monkeys Blindfold" and "Dissecting A Frog"
2018	The Super Slow Show	Herself	Episode: "Slow Learners"

=== Video games ===
Year	Title	Voice role	Notes
2003	X2: Wolverine's Revenge	Bush Pilot / May Deuce	
2020	Borderlands 3	Herself	

=== Podcast ===
Year	Title	Genre	Ref.
2021–present	Mayim Bialik's Breakdown	Focuses on mental health	

== Written works ==
=== Non-academic ===
- Bialik, Mayim; Jay Gordon (Introduction) (2012). Beyond the Sling: A Real-Life Guide to Raising Confident, Loving Children the Attachment Parenting Way. Touchstone. ISBN 978-1451662184.
- Bialik, Mayim; Jay Gordon (2014). Mayim's Vegan Table: More Than 100 Great-Tasting and Healthy Recipes from My Family to Yours. Da Capo Lifelong Books. ISBN 978-0738217048.
- Bialik, Mayim (2017) Girling Up: How to be Strong, Smart and Spectacular. Philomel Books. ISBN 978-0399548604.
- Bialik, Mayim (2018) Boying Up: How to be Brave, Bold and Brilliant. Philomel Books. ISBN 978-0525515975.
- Bialik, Mayim (2021) Flash Facts. DC Comics. ISBN 9781779503824.

=== Academic ===
- Dapretto, Mirella; Hariri, Ahmad; Bialik, Mayim H.; Bookheimer, Susan Y. (1999). "Cortical correlates of affective vs. linguistic prosody: An fMRI study". NeuroImage. 9 (2): S1054. ISSN 1053-8119.
- Bialik, Mayim Chaya (2007). Hypothalamic regulation in relation to maladaptive, obsessive-compulsive, affiliative, and satiety behaviors in Prader-Willi syndrome (PhD thesis). University of California, Los Angeles. OCLC 732917927. ProQuest 304879069.

== Awards and nominations ==
Year	Award	Category	Nominee	Result
1988	Young Artist Award	Best Young Actress in a Motion Picture Comedy or Fantasy	Beaches	Won
1990	Young Artist Award	Best Young Actress Guest Starring in a Television Series	Empty Nest	Nominated
1992	Young Artist Award	Best Young Actress in a New Television Series	Blossom	Nominated
1993	Young Artist Award	Outstanding Young Comedian in a Television Series	Blossom	Nominated
2012	Primetime Emmy Award	Outstanding Supporting Actress in a Comedy Series	The Big Bang Theory	Nominated
2012	Online Film and Television Association Award	Best Supporting Actress in a Comedy Series	The Big Bang Theory	Won
2012	Screen Actors Guild Award	Outstanding Performance by an Ensemble in a Comedy Series	The Big Bang Theory	Nominated
2012	Satellite Award	Best Supporting Actress - Series, Miniseries or Television Film	The Big Bang Theory	Nominated
2013	Primetime Emmy Award	Outstanding Supporting Actress in a Comedy Series	The Big Bang Theory	Nominated
2013	Online Film and Television Association Award	Best Supporting Actress in a Comedy Series	The Big Bang Theory	Won
2013	Screen Actors Guild Award	Outstanding Performance by an Ensemble in a Comedy Series	The Big Bang Theory	Nominated
2014	Primetime Emmy Award	Outstanding Supporting Actress in a Comedy Series	The Big Bang Theory	Nominated
2014	Screen Actors Guild Award	Outstanding Performance by an Ensemble in a Comedy Series	The Big Bang Theory	Nominated
2014	Screen Actors Guild Award	Outstanding Performance by a Female Actor in a Comedy Series	The Big Bang Theory	Nominated
2014	Online Film and Television Association Award	Best Supporting Actress in a Comedy Series	The Big Bang Theory	Nominated
2014	Critics' Choice Television Award	Best Supporting Actress in a Comedy Series	The Big Bang Theory	Nominated
2014	Young Hollywood Award	Best On-Screen Couple (with Jim Parsons)	The Big Bang Theory	Nominated
2014	TV Guide Award	Favorite Duo (with Jim Parsons)	The Big Bang Theory	Nominated
2015	Screen Actors Guild Award	Outstanding Performance by an Ensemble in a Comedy Series	The Big Bang Theory	Nominated
2015	Online Film and Television Association Award	Best Supporting Actress in a Comedy Series	The Big Bang Theory	Nominated
2015	Critics' Choice Television Award	Best Supporting Actress in a Comedy Series	The Big Bang Theory	Nominated
2015	Primetime Emmy Award	Outstanding Supporting Actress in a Comedy Series	The Big Bang Theory	Nominated
2016	Screen Actors Guild Award	Outstanding Performance by an Ensemble in a Comedy Series	The Big Bang Theory	Nominated
2016	Online Film and Television Association Award	Best Supporting Actress in a Comedy Series	The Big Bang Theory	Nominated
2016	Critics' Choice Television Award	Best Supporting Actress in a Comedy Series	The Big Bang Theory	Won
2017	Screen Actors Guild Award	Outstanding Performance by an Ensemble in a Comedy Series	The Big Bang Theory	Nominated
2017	Online Film and Television Association Award	Best Supporting Actress in a Comedy Series	The Big Bang Theory	Nominated
2018	Critics' Choice Television Award	Best Supporting Actress in a Comedy Series	The Big Bang Theory	Won
2019	Jew in the City Orthodox Jewish All Stars	Keter Shem Tov Award	Herself	Won
2023	Primetime Emmy Awards	Outstanding Host For A Game Show	Jeopardy!	Nominated

== See also ==
- List of artists and entertainers with advanced degrees
