= MacGyver (1985 TV series) season 2 =

MacGyver
- Season 2
- "His Mind Is the Ultimate Weapon"
- No. of episodes: 22

Release
- Original network: ABC
- Original release: September 22, 1986 – May 4, 1987

Season chronology
- ← Previous; Season 1 Next → Season 3

The second season of the American television series MacGyver, consisting of 22 episodes, began on September 22, 1986, and ended on May 4, 1987 and aired on the ABC network. The region 1 DVD was released on June 7, 2005.

== Episodes ==
No. overall	No. in season	Title	Directed by	Written by	Original release date	Rating/share (households)
23	1	"The Human Factor"	Charlie Correll	Robin Bernheim	September 22, 1986	15.4/24
When MacGyver is sent in to test security at a top secret military lab, the artificially intelligent central computer malfunctions and traps him and the scientist who built the AI inside, and he has to outsmart it to help them escape. Note: This is the first episode to feature Dana Elcar in the opening credits, after several guest starring roles in the first season.
24	2	"The Eraser"	Paul Krasny	Stephen Kronish	September 29, 1986	14.0/22
A hitman passes himself off as a father looking for his lost son, causing MacGyver to help him find his target.
25	3	"Twice Stung"	Paul Krasny	Story by : Bill Froehlich & Mark Lisson & Phil Combest; Teleplay by : Mark Lisson & Bill Froehlich	October 6, 1986	13.9/22
When a friend of MacGyver's attempts suicide over losing his life savings from a scam, Mac, Pete and a foundation employee devise a scam on the very con artist to steal back the money from he stole.
26	4	"The Wish Child"	Charlie Correll	Story by : Stephen Kronish & Brian Lane & Stephen Kandel; Teleplay by : Bill Froehlich & Stephen Kandel	October 20, 1986	13.1/20
MacGyver must rescue the brother of a friend when the boy gets tricked by scam artists to pass himself as the fulfillment of ancient Chinese legend. This episode features James Hong, Tia Carrere, George Takei and Michael Paul Chan.
27	5	"Final Approach"	Alexander Singer	Rob Hedden	October 27, 1986	10.3/15
MacGyver is stranded in the wilderness with a group of teenage gang members; he must get them to put aside their differences long enough to survive the ordeal.
28	6	"Jack of Lies"	Charlie Correll	Kerry Lenhart & John J. Sakmar	November 3, 1986	14.3/22
MacGyver's friend, Jack Dalton, tricks him into going to Central America to rescue a botanist, but she turns out to be an old friend of theirs. Note: First appearance of Bruce McGill as Jack Dalton.
29	7	"The Road Not Taken"	Cliff Bole	Story by : Chuck Bowman; Teleplay by : Stephen Kronish	November 10, 1986	14.9/23
MacGyver runs into an old girlfriend when he and Pete go into Southeast Asia to help a group of orphans escape a rogue militia group with intent on killing them.
30	8	"Eagles"	Paul Krasny	George Lee Marshall	November 17, 1986	14.6/22
MacGyver is sent up into the mountains to locate two endangered eagles; he also finds poachers trying to kill him after he witnessed the whole operation.
31	9	"Silent World"	James L. Conway	Stephen Kandel	November 24, 1986	14.4/22
A group of international thieves try to steal a top secret missile, and MacGyver's deaf friend dreams are the only key to help catch the bad guys.
32	10	"Three for the Road"	Alan Crosland	Story by : Mark Lisson & Rob Hedden; Teleplay by : John J. Sakmar & Kerry Lenhart	December 15, 1986	13.7/21
A stranded MacGyver hitches a ride with a retired actor and his wife — unaware that they are in possession of stolen counterfeit money while on the run from the mob.
33	11	"Phoenix Under Siege"	Gilbert M. Shilton	Story by : John I. Koivula; Teleplay by : Stephen Kronish	January 5, 1987	12.9/18
MacGyver and his grandfather stop by the foundation on their way to a hockey game to pick up the tickets; terrorists are there setting a bomb and trap MacGyver and his grandfather in the building.
34	12	"Family Matter"	Alexander Singer	Paul Magistretti	January 12, 1987	16.1/23
When Pete's ex-wife and son are kidnapped by a disgruntled former agent, MacGyver must come to the rescue.
35	13	"Soft Touch"	Charlie Correll	Joan Brooker & Nancy Eddo	January 19, 1987	16.7/23
After rescuing a Russian political prisoner from Siberia, MacGyver must foil a plot to assassinate a South American government official after Mac's lady friend, Penny Parker, witnesses the death of a federal agent at the hands of assassins. Guest starring: Teri Hatcher as Penny Parker.
36	14	"Birth Day"	James L. Conway	Rob Hedden	February 2, 1987	14.8/22
MacGyver must help a pregnant woman escape her ex-convict husband who intends to murder her after she discovers a secret about him.
37	15	"Pirates"	Bruce Kessler	Stephen Kandel	February 9, 1987	16.3/23
MacGyver must rescue a friend when she is kidnapped by pirates convinced she can lead them to sunken treasure.
38	16	"Out in the Cold"	Cliff Bole	Stephen Kronish	February 16, 1987	17.5/24
MacGyver and Pete are skiing when a mob informant plants microfilm on MacGyver; after getting back home the mob comes after them.
39	17	"Dalton, Jack of Spies"	Bob Sweeney	John J. Sakmar & Kerry Lenhart	February 23, 1987	15.8/23
Jack fakes his own death and MacGyver must help him clear his name after he is accused of murdering a CIA agent by two corrupt CIA agents.
40	18	"Partners"	Cliff Bole	Mark Lisson & Bill Froehlich	March 2, 1987	15.1/22
Murdoc, a master-of-disguise assassin who was long thought dead, lures MacGyver and Pete into a trap; while trying to escape they reminisce over their previous encounter with him. Notes: This episode also details on Mac's first meeting with Pete and joining the Phoenix Foundation. First appearance of Michael Des Barres as Murdoc.
41	19	"Bushmaster"	Don Chaffey	Rob Hedden	March 23, 1987	15.5/23
When MacGyver goes to South America to rescue a downed pilot, the pilot's daughter stows away on the trip to try to help.
42	20	"Friends"	Cliff Bole	Stephen Kronish	April 6, 1987	15.4/24
Jack Dalton lures MacGyver to the Phoenix Foundation for a surprise birthday party where many of his friends from past adventures are waiting; this makes him reconsider his recently tendered resignation.
43	21	"D.O.A.: MacGyver"	Cliff Bole	Jaison Starkes	April 27, 1987	12.6/21
MacGyver's friend is killed after telling him of a bomb to be planted at a funeral; while escaping his friend's killers, he receives a head injury which causes amnesia. Can MacGyver regain his memories and stop the bombing in time?
44	22	"For Love or Money"	James L. Conway	Douglas Heyes, Jr.	May 4, 1987	12.3/20
MacGyver must team up with an agent who he despises in order to break a political prisoner out of Czechoslovakia while avoiding GRU agents. Note: This is the last episode to be filmed on location in Los Angeles until season 7; filming and production relocated to Vancouver, British Columbia for seasons 3–6.
