= MacGyver (1985 TV series) season 5 =

MacGyver
- Season 5
- "The Right Man When Things Go Wrong"
- No. of episodes: 21

Release
- Original network: ABC
- Original release: September 18, 1989 – April 30, 1990

Season chronology
- ← Previous; Season 4 Next → Season 6

The fifth season of MacGyver, an American television series, began September 18, 1989, and ended on April 30, 1990. It aired on ABC. The region 1 DVD was released on March 14, 2006.

== Production ==
During the fifth season, Dana Elcar began suffering the severe effects of aging glaucoma. Because of this, the producers of MacGyver wanted to write him out of the show. Richard Dean Anderson, however, suggested that Elcar’s disease be incorporated into the show, allowing him to continue his portrayal of Pete Thornton.

== Episodes ==
No. overall	No. in season	Title	Directed by	Written by	Original release date	U.S. viewers (millions)
84	1	"Legend of the Holy Rose (Part 1)"	Michael Caffey	Stephen Downing	September 18, 1989	14.4
After completing a rescue mission in Colombia, MacGyver is enticed by an archaeologist friend to join her quest for the Holy Grail.
85	2	"Legend of the Holy Rose (Part 2)"	Charlie Correll	Stephen Downing	September 25, 1989	18.1
MacGyver and Zoe's search is complicated by Von Leer (Christopher Neame), a corrupt gem dealer, stealing ancient artifacts they need.
86	3	"The Black Corsage"	Charlie Correll	Paul B. Margolis	October 2, 1989	18.3
MacGyver joins bounty hunter Frank Colton (Cleavon Little) to track Bulgarian defector Sophia Ross (Christianne Hirt) running from bandits looking for a valuable ancient necklace.
87	4	"Cease Fire"	William Gereghty	Chris Haddock	October 9, 1989	17.0
Assisting the negotiations between two countries at a conference in Geneva, MacGyver is framed for a sniper's assassination attempt on President Habad (Michael Naxos) by the president's advisor. His only ally is a schoolgirl (Mayim Bialik) he encountered while on the run.
88	5	"Second Chance"	Michael Caffey	Robert Sherman	October 16, 1989	19.9
MacGyver heads a project bringing young Amerasians to the United States, but his companion meets the son he did not know he had. But the boy is involved with thieves stealing high end products, including a dialysis machine.
89	6	"Halloween Knights"	Charlie Correll	John Sheppard	October 30, 1989	19.2
An old nemesis, Murdoc (Michael Des Barres), forges an uneasy alliance with MacGyver to free his innocent sister, who is being held captive by his ruthless mentor and the organization of assassins he works for.
90	7	"Children of Light"	Bill Corcoran	Rick Mittleman	November 6, 1989	19.7
Chinese student Mei Jan (Michele B. Chan) arrives at MacGyver's home claiming to be his foster daughter Sue Ling, but later she is not who she is and holds evidence of the massacre at Tiananmen Square. That evidence is being sought by Chinese government officials who want those secrets buried.
91	8	"Black Rhino"	Michael Caffey	Paul B. Margolis	November 13, 1989	19.2
In Kambezi, MacGyver helps Billy Colton (Cuba Gooding, Jr.) track down "Ladysmith" de Bruin (Kai Wulff), a South African poacher who butchers endangered black rhinos for their valuable horns.
92	9	"The Ten Percent Solution"	Michael Preece	Tom Drake & Sally Drake	November 20, 1989	18.2
MacGyver investigates a Holocaust survivor's claim to a masterpiece painting as belonging to him before the Nazi regime confiscated it and uncovers a conspiracy by neo-Nazi supremacists with intent to create an Aryan nation inside the United States.
93	10	"Two Times Trouble"	Michael Preece	Robert Sherman	December 11, 1989	19.3
MacGyver's rock singer friend Roxie (Audrey Landers) believes her twin sister Carla is trying to kill her. But not everything is what it appears to be.
94	11	"The Madonna"	Michael Caffey	Cathleen Young	December 18, 1989	17.2
MacGyver helps a priest friend search on Christmas Eve for a church's stolen Madonna statue with the involvement of an unusual homeless woman staying at the Challenger Club, who seems surrounded by minor miracles.
95	12	"Serenity"	William Gereghty	Stephen Kandel	January 8, 1990	22.2
Exhausted from work, MacGyver falls asleep and dreams that he is in the Old West aiming to retire with a claim to a Montana ranch home, although trouble soon starts with neighboring landowner Pete Thornton and his hired mercenary, Murdoc. Note: Last official appearance of Teri Hatcher as Penny Parker; she later appeared in flashback scenes in season 6's "Hind-Sight."
96	13	"Live and Learn"	Harry Harris	Rick Mittleman	January 15, 1990	22.1
MacGyver and Pete initiate a program to assist high school dropouts, in the process crossing paths with a student who struggles between his love for electrical engineering and his father, who is involved in the construction business. When the student witnesses a bribery to a safety inspector, only MacGyver can help prove his claim.
97	14	"Log Jam"	William Gereghty	Lee Maddux	February 5, 1990	21.4
While visiting an environmental activist friend, MacGyver must aid in investigating the death of a logger. The culprit is the supervisor and an employee, under orders from the company's owner with ties to the Yakuza.
98	15	"The Treasure of Manco"	Michael Preece	Chris Haddock	February 12, 1990	19.6
MacGyver helps a friend discover some Incan treasure in Peru, only to encounter an old acquaintance now the commander of a guerrilla army.
99	16	"Jenny's Chance"	Michael Caffey	Rick Drew & John Sheppard	February 19, 1990	23.0
MacGyver, Jack Dalton (Bruce McGill), and Pete Thornton arrange an elaborate sting operation to trap a ruthless money launderer (Vic Tayback, in his final acting role) who rigs horse races with the aid of infrasound, who is also responsible for the death of a horse trainer friend of Mac and Jack, and is threatening the trainer's daughter (Linda Blair.)
100	17	"Deep Cover"	Charlie Correll	Robert Sherman & Paul B. Margolis	February 26, 1990	20.1
A corporate spy steals a prototype sonar equipment by seducing the Phoenix Foundation engineer who designed it.
101	18	"The Lost Amadeus"	Michael Caffey	Paul B. Margolis	March 19, 1990	20.6
An eccentric woman leads MacGyver on a wild adventure to save a priceless violin and the virtuoso owner.
102	19	"Hearts of Steel"	Charlie Correll	Rick Mittleman	April 9, 1990	18.8
A group of disgruntled former steelworkers demand a ransom by kidnapping the daughter of the corporate executive responsible for the closure of their mill.
103	20	"Rush to Judgement"	Charlie Correll	Robert Sherman	April 16, 1990	18.4
As a juror in an intense murder trial, MacGyver takes the time to investigate the case on his own.
104	21	"Passages"	William Gereghty	Story by : Anthony Rich; Teleplay by : John Sheppard	April 30, 1990	18.4
While on the trail of a priceless Egyptian artifact, MacGyver falls into a coma and is hospitalized. Struck with mysterious visions of the afterlife, he reconnects with his grandfather and deceased parents.
