= MacGyver (1985 TV series) season 4 =

MacGyver
- Season 4
- "He Acts Fast and Thinks Faster"
- No. of episodes: 19

Release
- Original network: ABC
- Original release: October 31, 1988 – May 15, 1989

Season chronology
- ← Previous; Season 3 Next → Season 5

The fourth season of the American television series MacGyver consisting of 19 episodes. The series began on October 31, 1988 and ended on May 15, 1989 while it aired on the ABC network. The first season of the series to be broadcast in stereo. The region 1 DVD was released on December 6, 2005.

== Episodes ==
| No. overall | No. in season | Title | Directed by | Written by | Original release date | U.S. viewers (millions) | Rating/share (households) |
|---|---|---|---|---|---|---|---|
| 65 | 1 | "The Secret of Parker House" | Mike Vejar | Story by : Gene Hanson; Teleplay by : Rick Drew & John Sheppard & Gene Hanson | October 31, 1988 | 18.1 | 12.5/20 |
MacGyver is a ghostbuster in a spooky old house inherited by Penny Parker who is a dead ringer for her insane aunt, who once lived in the house. But this haunted house hide a long buried secret.
| 66 | 2 | "Blood Brothers" | Charlie Correll | Rick Drew | November 21, 1988 | 18.6 | 12.2/20 |
Back in his childhood home town, MacGyver is haunted by memories of his youth where a friend was killed by a gun while preventing his friend's son from suffering the same fate as a result of handling local drug dealers. Guest stars: Jason Priestley
| 67 | 3 | "The Outsiders" | Mike Vejar | Michelle Poteet Lisanti | November 28, 1988 | 18.6 | 13.2/20 |
After surviving a car accident, MacGyver is taken in by an Amish family and he must help them settle their dispute with land developers.
| 68 | 4 | "On a Wing and a Prayer" | Charlie Correll | John Whelpley | December 5, 1988 | 16.2 | 11.7/18 |
Thornton and a nun are taken hostage by Central American rebels, and MacGyver and Jack must rescue them.
| 69 | 5 | "Collision Course" | Chuck Bowman | Paul B. Margolis | December 12, 1988 | 16.9 | 11.7/19 |
An important sports car race demonstrating new engine technology is sabotaged and the lead driver is injured as a result of the accident, so MacGyver must drive the race car. The sabotage is the work of a corrupt businessman and a rival racer from Mac's past.
| 70 | 6 | "The Survivors" | Michael Caffey | Reed Moran | January 9, 1989 | 20.3 | 13.5/20 |
MacGyver and Thornton discover the wreckage of a DEA plane shot down by drug smugglers during an annual wilderness survival training.
| 71 | 7 | "Deadly Dreams" | Les Landau | Stephen Downing | January 16, 1989 | 20.3 | 13.2/20 |
MacGyver helps the police pursue an escaped psychopath, who turns out to be a puppet to Dr. Zito, a psychopathic criminal genius.
| 72 | 8 | "Ma Dalton" | Rob Bowman | John Whelpley | January 23, 1989 | 21.9 | 14.6/22 |
Jack Dalton and MacGyver search for Dalton's mother who is a fugitive pursued by a bounty hunter and a corrupt stock trader from her past.
| 73 | 9 | "Cleo Rocks" | Chuck Bowman | John Sheppard & Rick Drew | February 6, 1989 | 20.9 | 13.2/19 |
A shadowy figure, Murdoc, lurks backstage to manipulate Penny Parker in a suspicious rock musical to those he failed to kill, Pete and MacGyver.
| 74 | 10 | "Fraternity of Thieves" | Michael Preece | Grant Rosenberg | February 13, 1989 | 21.0 | 13.9/21 |
Leaks from a classified Phoenix system technology suggest a double agent working within the foundation. The double agent happens to be closer than everyone could ever imagine.
| 75 | 11 | "The Battle of Tommy Giordano" | Mike Vejar | Marianne Clarkson | February 20, 1989 | 22.9 | 14.6/22 |
MacGyver's friend wins custody of her son, causing her ex-husband to involve his uncle, the head of a crime family.
| 76 | 12 | "The Challenge" | Dana Elcar | Chris Haddock | February 27, 1989 | 22.4 | 15.0/22 |
A Challenger club youth is framed for theft by a bigot who's trying to shut the club down.
| 77 | 13 | "Runners" | Michael Caffey | Joel Schwartz | March 13, 1989 | 23.0 | 15.2/23 |
MacGyver protects a runaway girl; her bitter past reminds him of some of his own.
| 78 | 14 | "Gold Rush" | William Gereghty | David Engelbach | March 27, 1989 | 22.3 | 15.1/24 |
An easy US-Soviet salvage operation of Russian gold in Alaska is complicated by unwanted competition.
| 79 | 15 | "The Invisible Killer" | Dana Elcar | Chris Haddock | April 10, 1989 | 23.3 | 15.5/24 |
A wilderness stress relief outing for Phoenix employees turns to a fight for survival, when escaped convicts begin posing as members of the hike.
| 80 | 16 | "Brainwashed" | Michael Caffey | John Sheppard | April 24, 1989 | 18.1 | 12.7/22 |
Jack Dalton is brainwashed to assassinate a foreign African country's president. But when MacGyver tries to de-programs him, he realizes that Jack wasn't their only "puppet".
| 81 | 17 | "Easy Target" | Charlie Correll | Rick Drew | May 1, 1989 | 20.2 | 13.5/22 |
Terrorists hold MacGyver and Thornton hostage as they attempt to cripple the city with a stolen EMP generator.
| 82 | 18 | "Renegade" | Michael Caffey | Story by : Robert Bielak & Chris Haddock; Teleplay by : Chris Haddock | May 8, 1989 | 20.8 | 13.9/23 |
MacGyver pursues a mentally disturbed ex-Navy SEAL who has stolen a vial of anthrax from the Phoenix Foundation. The case is personal for Mac for the same thief saved his life in the past.
| 83 | 19 | "Unfinished Business" | Charlie Correll | Marianne Clarkson | May 15, 1989 | 19.0 | 13.2/22 |
MacGyver, Peter Thornton and Jack Dalton are stalked by a female former lover of MacGyver with business to finish with him.
