= Dennis Foley =

American novelist

- Military career
- Allegiance: United States
- Branch: United States Army
- Service years: 1962-1982
- Rank: Lieutenant Colonel
- Commands: 1st Battalion, 327th Infantry Regiment, A Company, 75th Ranger Regiment, Special Forces A team
- Conflicts: Vietnam War
- Awards: 2 Silver Stars, 4 Bronze Stars
- Other work: Screenwriter, Author
- Website: www.dennisfoley.com

Dennis Foley is a former special forces officer who fought in the Vietnam War and is the author of the Jim Hollister series of military fiction novels. Since retiring from the military, he has written for television and film and served as a technical adviser for television and film.

== Military service ==
Foley joined the army before he was drafted into the military from high school and attended basic training at Fort Dix. It was there that he became fascinated by the Airborne Special Forces after seeing a recruiting pitch made by two Rangers. He arrived in Vietnam in December 1965 and was assigned to command the Tiger Force of the 1st Battalion of the 327th Infantry Regiment. He remained with that unit until 1967. Foley went on to command a long range patrol company, a Ranger company, two rifle companies, two special forces teams, and an airborne battalion headquarters company. These postings took him to Germany, Vietnam, Thailand, and elsewhere in South East Asia. At one point, he was assigned to the teaching staff of the Command and General Staff College at Fort Leavenworth, where he was a Tactics and Special Operations instructor.

== Civilian life ==
In 1982, Foley retired from the military after 20 years of service. He has since worked as a screenwriter in Hollywood, an author, and a writing instructor.

== Bibliography ==
- Foley, Dennis (1994). Special Men: a LRP's Recollections. New York: Ivy Books. ISBN 9780804109154. OCLC 30994804.

== Television credits ==
=== Writing ===
- MacGyver, "The Golden Triangle" episode (1985)

=== Technical advisor ===
- She's in the Army Now (1981)
- World War III (1982)
