= The Global Forum for Combating Antisemitism =

International meeting

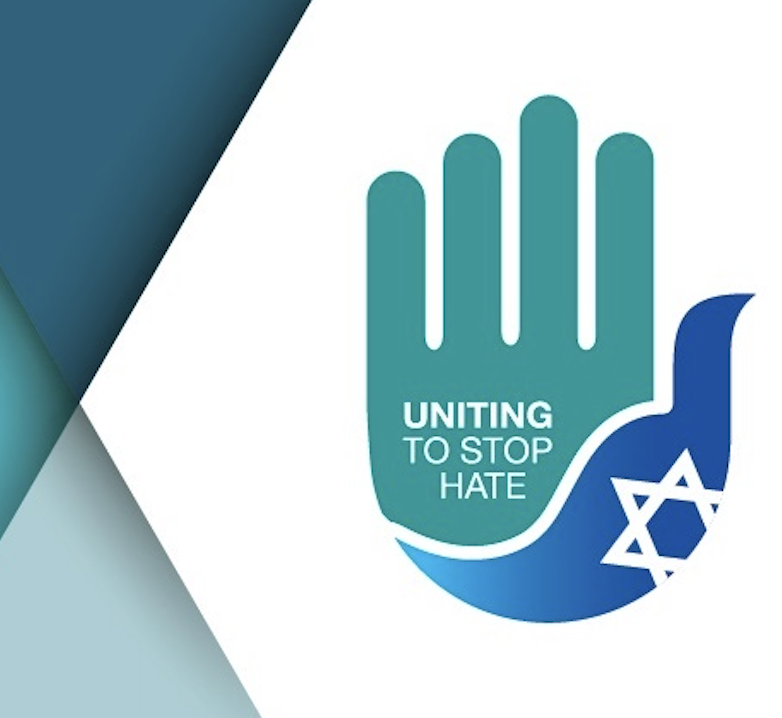
Logo of the 6th Global Forum Conference

The Global Forum for Combating Antisemitism is an international gathering for assessing the state of antisemitism globally and formulating effective forms of societal and governmental response. The forum is a project of the Israel Ministry of Foreign Affairs.

The first forum took place in 2004 and has since taken place every two to three years in Jerusalem. The Sixth Global Forum for Combating Antisemitism was held from 15-21 of March 2018. This forum was held in cooperation with the Israel Ministry for Diaspora Affairs.

The 2018 forum focused on the continuing challenge of web antisemitism and cyberhate, 1500 participants, along with senior government ministers, from Israel, Europe and Latin America attended the forum.

== Statements adopted by various Global Forums ==
At the 5th GFCA, in 2015, a document confronting Cyberhate and Online Antisemitism in Europe were signed. During the 6th GFCA, in 2018, Israeli Justice Minister, Ayelet Shaked, co-signed a joint statement on Countering online Hate Speech and Incitement to Violence and Terrorism, along with the Justice Ministers of Italy, Malta, and the Hellenic Republic. This joint statement recognised freedom of expression as a fundamental right of a democratic society which has been enhanced by the technology of the internet; it noted however that internet companies needed to do more to combat and differentiate between freedom of expression and hate speech.

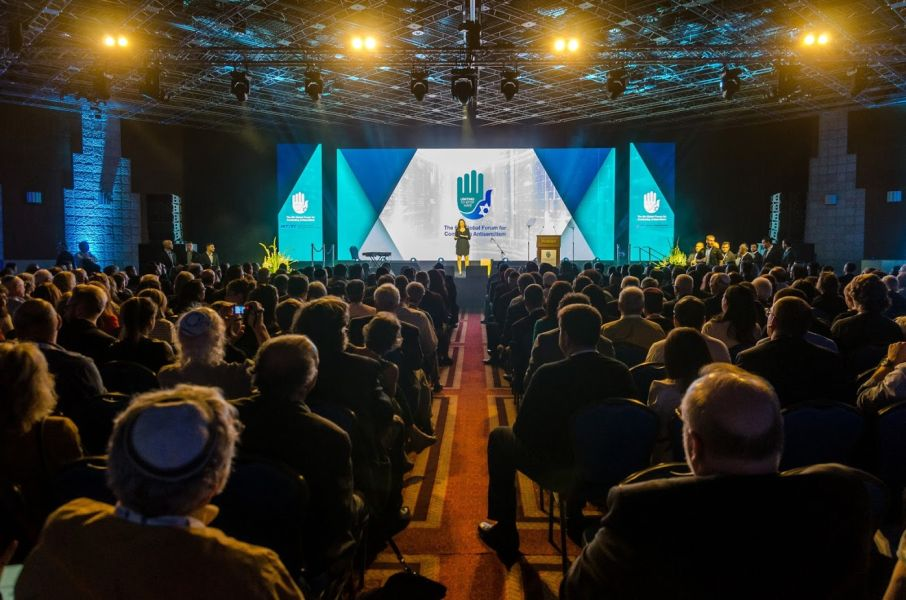
Attendees at the GFCA 2018

== Attendees ==
Key attendees of the GFCA in 2013 include:

Country	Attendees	Title	Additional
Canada	Dr. Mario Silva	Chairman of the IHRA (International Holocaust Remembrance Alliance) for the year 2013	
Greece	Konstantinos Karagounis	Deputy Minister of Justice, Transparency & Human Rights	
Hungary	Dr. Bence Retvari	Secretary of State, Ministry of Public Administration and Justice	
Israel	Zeev Elkin Naftali Bennett	Deputy Minister of Foreign Affairs Minister for Jerusalem and Diaspora Affairs	
Lithuania	Neris Germanas	Vice Minister of Foreign Affairs of the Republic of Lithuania	

Key attendees of the GFCA in 2015 included:

Country	Attendees	Title	Additional
Canada	Tim Uppal	Minister of State for Multiculturalism	
France	Anne Hidalgo	Mayor of Paris	
Germany	Heiko Maas	Minister of Justice	
Israel	Benjamin Netanyahu Naftali Bennett	Prime Minister of Israel Minister for Diaspora Affairs	
UN	Nickolay Mladenov	Special UN Coordinator for the Middle East Peace Process	Delivered a message from United Nations Secretary General Ban Ki-moon

Key attendees of the GFCA in 2018 included:

Country	Atendees	Title	Additional
Bulgaria	Rumen Radev	President of Bulgaria	
France	Manuel Valls	former Prime Minister of France	
Israel	Benjamin Netanyahu Naftali Bennett Tzipi Hotoveley Natan Sharansky	Prime Minister of Israel Minister of Education Deputy Minister of Foreign Affairs Former Chairman of the Jewish Agency for Israel	Keynote Speaker
Greece	Stavros Kontonis	Minister of Justice, Transparency and Human Rights	
Italy	Imam Yahya Sergio Yahe Pallavicini Andrea Orlando	Vice President of the Islamic Community of Italy Minister of Justice	
Malta	Owen Bonnici	Minister of Justice, Culture and Local Government	
UK	Ephraim Mirvis	Chief Rabbi of the Commonwealth	
UN	Irina Bokova	former Director-General of UNESCO	
US	Malcom I. Hoenlein David Friedman Mike Singer Ronald S. Lauder Mayim Bialik	Executive Vice Chairman of Conference of Presidents of Major American Jewish Organizations US Ambassador to the state of Israel The former mayor of Charlottesville President of WJC Actress and Neuroscientist	Keynote Speaker

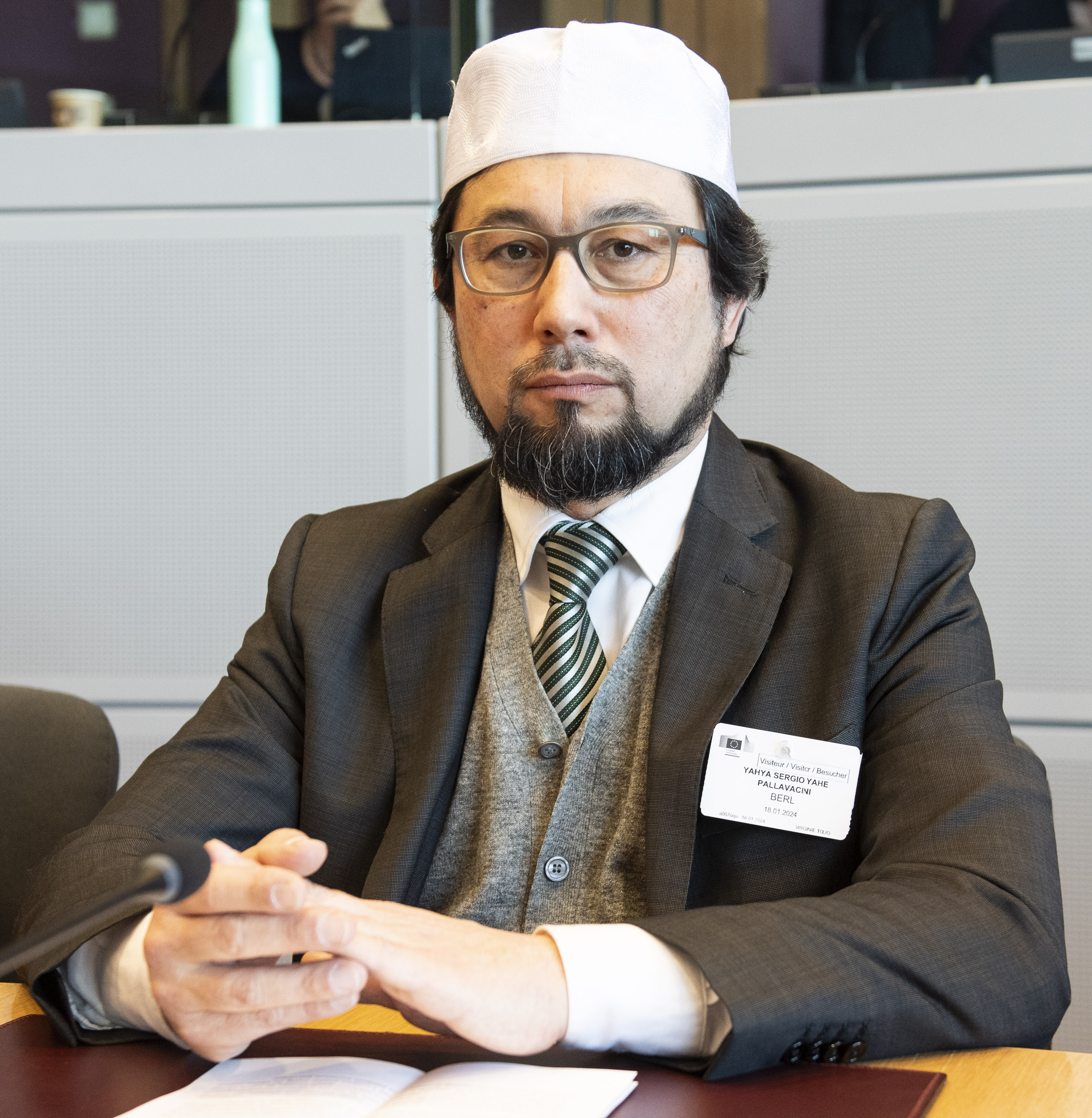
Imam Yahya Sergio Pallavicini

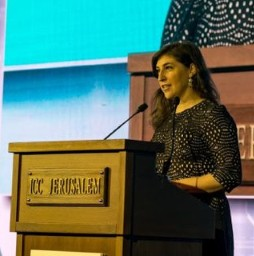
Keynote Address by Mayim Bialik
