= MacGyver (1985 TV series) season 3 =

MacGyver
- Season 3
- "Saving the Day Is All in a Day's Work"
- No. of episodes: 20

Release
- Original network: ABC
- Original release: September 21, 1987 – May 9, 1988

Season chronology
- ← Previous; Season 2 Next → Season 4

The third season of the American television series MacGyver, consisting of 20 episodes, began on September 21, 1987, and ended on May 9, 1988, and aired on the ABC network. The region 1 DVD was released on September 6, 2005.

== Episodes ==
No. overall	No. in season	Title	Directed by	Written by	Original release date	Rating/share (households)
45	1	"Lost Love (Part 1)"	Cliff Bole	Jerry Ludwig	September 21, 1987	11.9/20
While protecting a priceless Chinese artifact, MacGyver encounters an old flame, who he thought was dead.
46	2	"Lost Love (Part 2)"	Cliff Bole	Jerry Ludwig	September 28, 1987	12.2/19
While protecting a priceless Chinese artifact, MacGyver tries to rescue his love from danger.
47	3	"Back from the Dead"	James L. Conway	Stephen Kronish	October 5, 1987	12.2/20
MacGyver helps a former hit-man in the witness protection program after the mob rediscovers him. Note: This episode features a special appearance by baseball Hall of Famer Hank Aaron.
48	4	"Ghost Ship"	Mike Vejar	Stephen Kandel	October 19, 1987	13.1/21
While on an assignment to plant beacons for a mapping expedition in the Alaskan wilderness, MacGyver stumbles upon an abandoned ship with a teenage girl and the legendary Bigfoot.
49	5	"Fire and Ice"	Alan Simmonds	Rick Husky	October 26, 1987	13.7/22
After his friend is killed, MacGyver must go after the killer with the help from his friend's sister, Nikki Carpenter. The diamond thief they are both after is a diplomat with immunity. Note: First guest starring appearance of Elyssa Davalos as Nikki Carpenter; she previously played the role of Lisa Kosov in both "Lost Love" episodes.
50	6	"GX-1"	Mike Vejar	Calvin Clements, Jr.	November 2, 1987	11.2/17
MacGyver and Nikki Carpenter, who don't get along well with each other, must beat the Soviets to find a downed experimental USAF stealth fighter jet. The added difficulty for the task is that they must help a Soviet psychic defect from his people.
51	7	"Jack in the Box"	James L. Conway	David Rich	November 9, 1987	14.3/23
Jack Dalton's antics get him and MacGyver thrown into a Southern work camp with a corrupt warden. The intentions of the corrupt sheriff, the warden and the greedy mine owner are to find stolen money. Guest starring: Lance LeGault as Sheriff 'Bull' Bodine
52	8	"The Widowmaker"	Mike Vejar	Story by : Harv Zimmel; Teleplay by : John Whelpley	November 16, 1987	13.7/22
While grieving over the loss of a friend on the mountain called Widowmaker, MacGyver's old nemesis, Murdoc, resurfaces and tries to finish what he started years ago.
53	9	"Hell Week"	James L. Conway	Leonard Mlodinow & Scott Rubenstein	November 23, 1987	13.2/21
MacGyver is picked to judge a contest at his old college, but an upset student, who is the son of MacGyver's professor, makes a bomb which MacGyver must defuse.
54	10	"Blow Out"	Cliff Bole	Reed Moran	December 21, 1987	11.4/19
MacGyver must figure out why terrorists are trying to kill Nikki Carpenter and prevent the terrorist group from carrying out their next target.
55	11	"Kill Zone"	Chuck Bowman	Calvin Clements, Jr.	January 4, 1988	15.4/22
When a virus that mysteriously causes things to grow old quickly is accidentally unleashed, MacGyver must stop it before it is released upon the world.
56	12	"Early Retirement"	Cliff Bole	John Whelpley	January 18, 1988	13.9/20
Pete is framed for an accident, and MacGyver has to prove Pete's innocence before his successor, who framed him, carries out an insidious plan on a visiting foreign dignitary.
57	13	"Thin Ice"	Cliff Bole	Rick Drew	February 1, 1988	12.9/19
While helping his hospitalized high school hockey coach take the school team to the state championship, MacGyver must deal with the star player's bad temper and non-sportsmanship.
58	14	"The Odd Triple"	James L. Conway	Stephen Kandel	February 29, 1988	14.0/21
Jack Dalton unwittingly gets MacGyver involved in a high profile jewelry heist; Pete must come to their rescue in France.
59	15	"The Negotiator"	Charlie Correll	Calvin Clements, Jr.	March 7, 1988	13.0/20
A real estate developer tries to order MacGyver killed when his environmental study threatens a major oceanfront development project. Note: Last official appearance of Elyssa Davalos as Nikki Carpenter; she later appeared in flashback scenes in season 4's "Unfinished Business."
60	16	"The Spoilers"	Mike Vejar	Stephen Kandel	March 14, 1988	15.4/23
MacGyver and a mountain hermit work together to try and stop a chemical plant owner from illegally dumping radioactive and toxic waste into a stream. Guest starring: Randall "Tex" Cobb.
61	17	"Mask of the Wolf"	Cliff Bole	Story by : John J. Sakmar & Kerry Lenhart and Calvin Clements, Jr. & Reed Moran; Teleplay by : Calvin Clements & Jr. & Reed Moran	March 28, 1988	13.5/21
MacGyver and Jack must help an elderly Inuk man to try and stop two criminals intending on steal a tribal sacred wolf mask.
62	18	"Rock the Cradle"	Mike Vejar	John Whelpley	April 18, 1988	13.0/21
MacGyver and Jack are stuck caring for an abandoned baby while looking for the mother, who is on the run from counterfeiters.
63	19	"The Endangered"	Charlie Correll	Peter Filardi	May 2, 1988	13.3/22
MacGyver goes to visit an old girlfriend who is now a park ranger and must help her stop a group of poachers.
64	20	"Murderers' Sky"	Mike Vejar	Herman Miller	May 9, 1988	14.3/23
When an elderly Chinese businessman is murdered by criminals who want to take over his business, MacGyver and the man's grandson must work together to thwart the criminals' plot to take over the company. Guest starring: Tia Carrere.
