= MacGyver (1985 TV series) season 1 =

MacGyver
- Season 1
- "Always Prepared for Adventure"
- No. of episodes: 22

Release
- Original network: ABC
- Original release: September 29, 1985 – May 7, 1986

Season chronology
- Next → Season 2

The first season of the American television series MacGyver, consisting of 22 episodes, began on September 29, 1985, and ended on May 7, 1986, and aired on the ABC network. The region 1 DVD was released on January 25, 2005.

== Summary ==
In this season, the show introduces MacGyver, described as "an action hero who practiced non-violent methods and fought with his mind instead of his hands or weapons." It follows MacGyver and his friend Pete, as they use tools and cleverness to deal with difficult and often dangerous situations.

== Episodes ==
No. overall	No. in season	Title	Directed by	Written by	Original release date	Rating/share (households)
1	1	"Pilot"	Jerrold Freedman (as Alan Smithee)	Thackary Pallor	September 29, 1985	10.9/17
On top of a vertical rock face encampment, MacGyver rescues a captured Air Force pilot and reacquires a component from a top secret missile in Central Asia from the armed captors. Although MacGyver doesn't believe in using guns, he carries one (a Valmet rifle disguised as an AKM) in order to appear like one of the guards and later rigs it to fire off as a distraction in the opening gambit of the pilot episode. Extremely out-of-character for later MacGyver episodes he also shoots twice at the guards pursuing them, then hands the weapon over to the Air Force pilot he is rescuing while he prepares their escape. After coming home, he is called in to rescue a group of scientists trapped in an underground New Mexico laboratory after a major explosion. The explosion causes a sulfuric acid leak that puts MacGyver in a rush with time before the acid leaks into the aquifer. It turns out that this explosion was not an accident; it was planned by one of the trapped scientists to prevent his ozone research from getting turned into a doomsday weapon. MacGyver survival techniques include using chocolate bars to plug the sulfuric acid leak (the sugar forms a sticky paste when it reacts with the acid) and making an alkali metal (sodium in a cold pill) and water bomb to blow a hole in a wall. Note: Dana Elcar appears in this episode as a guest star playing Andy Colson, not as his later regular role of MacGyver's boss Peter Thornton.
2	2	"The Golden Triangle"	Donald Petrie (opening gambit); Paul Stanley	Terry Nation (opening gambit); Dennis Foley	October 6, 1985	12.2/19
MacGyver is in a junkyard trying to stop the transaction of top secret missile launch codes by corrupt Pentagon officials. MacGyver has 24 hours to get in and out of Burma to retrieve a canister of deadly toxin from a crashed American jet. However, during his mission, he gets captured by a local opium drug lord, Truang, who mistakes him for a narcotics agent. Truang and his General, Narai, have the local villagers enslaved to produce the drug harvest. MacGyver escapes and then completes his initial mission by returning the poison canister to his escape helicopter. However, instead of fleeing, MacGyver decides to stay in Burma to help the villagers fight the drug lords and their henchmen. Survival techniques include creating a choking gas by igniting fire ash and alcohol inside bamboo and creating a diversion using foliage in the road that looks so phony, the enemy takes a detour route, leading them into the real trap: a dug out pit that incapacitates their vehicles.
3	3	"Thief of Budapest"	Lee H. Katzin (opening gambit); John Patterson	Terry Nation & Stephen Downing (opening gambit); Joe Viola	October 13, 1985	13.0/19
MacGyver's mission is to retrieve a very valuable horse from Arabian tribesmen who stole it. After a wild horse chase along a beach, a helicopter airlifts him and the horse away to safety. MacGyver goes to Hungary to meet with his Russian double-agent friend Grotsky. Grotsky has valuable intelligence information about Soviet spies infiltrating the US hidden inside his pocket watch. However, before MacGyver can obtain possession of it, the watch was pick-pocketed by a little Gypsy girl named Jana. MacGyver's new mission now is to retrieve the stolen watch from the girl before Soviet agents, who want to reacquire the information, do. The car chase from this episode, featuring three Mini Coopers, was taken from the British caper film The Italian Job, which was filmed in Turin in 1969.
4	4	"The Gauntlet"	Lee H. Katzin	Judy Burns (opening gambit); Stephen Kandel	October 21, 1985	14.3/22
MacGyver's mission is to sneak into a compound in a Middle Eastern country and retrieve a planning map that reveals target locations marked by terrorists. He is spotted when he tries to escape and uses the map in various resourceful ways to aid in his escape, eventually eluding his pursuers by lifting off in a hot air balloon. When he returns, he is sent to Central America on a mission to bring an American journalist, Kate Connolly, back home. Kate agrees to go home but only when she completes her big story which is an American criminal with a personal grudge against a man named Dave Reyerson and a military general named Vasquez negotiating a deal over weapons with evidence of a brewing coup d'état. After Kate photographs the incriminating evidence, MacGyver and she must now escape from Vasquez's men by fleeing to the Mexican border.
5	5	"The Heist"	? (as Alan Smithee)	Story by : Larry Alexander & James Schmerer; Teleplay by : James Schmerer	November 3, 1985	14.3/20
MacGyver helps a politician's daughter steal back $60 million in diamonds that were stolen by a ex-militia leader casino owner.
6	6	"Trumbo's World"	Lee H. Katzin (opening gambit); Donald Petrie	Stephen Kandel	November 10, 1985	15.6/22
MacGyver must rescue a kidnapped scientist from foreign mercenaries. MacGyver and a wildlife photographer friend (played by Peter Jurasik) must uncover the reason for the strange happenings in the Amazon rainforest. Then, in a story based on "Leiningen Versus the Ants", MacGyver helps a man in the Amazon jungle defend his plantation against billions of ants. Some footage from the 1954 film The Naked Jungle was used in this episode.
7	7	"Last Stand"	John Florea	Judy Burns	November 17, 1985	15.8/22
Armed thieves take MacGyver and a small group hostage at a rural airport. He has to figure out how to defeat the thieves and free the hostages, including himself.
8	8	"Hellfire"	Richard Colla	Story by : Douglas Brooks West; Teleplay by : Stephen Kandel & James Schmerer & Douglas Brooks West	November 27, 1985	13.1/21
MacGyver's friends, Bill and Laura (played by Nana Visitor), are drilling for oil in a remote area when the oil well catches fire. MacGyver suggests calling for help but Bill says that they don't have enough time to wait because their lease expires in two weeks. MacGyver says that he will help put it out. The two of them travel to an old abandoned mine to look for dynamite. Their hope is that by dropping explosives into the oil well shaft, it will explode and consume all of the surrounding oxygen, thereby extinguishing the fire. They manage to find some crates of dynamite in the mine and return with it. To get close enough to drop the explosives, they fashion a rail system using an old car and a refrigerator that acts as a heat shield. After a collection of team work, the fire is finally extinguished. MacGyver offers his assistance to rebuild the rig and help them drill.
9	9	"The Prodigal"	Alexander Singer	Story by : David Abramowitz & Paul Savage; Teleplay by : David Abramowitz	December 8, 1985	11.6/17
MacGyver meets up with Frank Bennett, a man who is considering testifying in Federal Court against his mobster brother, Joey. When Mac leaves for a moment, a black car drives up and two men grab Frank. The two men take him to Joey, who knows that Frank has been talking to Federal Agents. Frank wants Joey to shut down his drug business. Joey says that will not happen and is on the verge of killing him when MacGyver sets up a diversion, and helps Frank escape. Frank goes to Federal Marshal Wylie's office to give a statement, after asking MacGyver to visit his mother in the hospital. MacGyver learns that Frank's mother is dying and wishes to see her son one last time. The Feds disapprove of this because it is too risky for their key witness. However, MacGyver needs to keep his promise to Frank's mother and so he frees Frank from Wylie's men. They later discover that Joey moved Mrs. Bennett to her home. MacGyver warns Frank that it's a trap, but Frank insists on seeing her. Frank is allowed to visit his mother, who then passes away. MacGyver must then extract themselves from the house before Joey and his mob crew can kill them.
10	10	"Target MacGyver"	Lee H. Katzin (opening gambit); Ernest Pintoff	Terry Nation (opening gambit); Story by : Mike Marvin; Teleplay by : Stephen Kandel & Mike Marvin & James Schmerer	December 22, 1985	13.2/21
MacGyver rescues a kidnapped Army General. After MacGyver destroys a Middle-Eastern nuclear reactor, the operators sent a professional assassin team on him. Mac goes to visit his grandfather in order to lie low, but the assassins tracked him down.
11	11	"Nightmares"	Cliff Bole	James Schmerer	January 15, 1986	15.9/23
MacGyver is poisoned with a hallucinogenic drug and he only has a short time to find and take the antidote before the poison kills him. A young girl he met is his only hope into acquiring the antidote and bringing in the criminal to justice. Note: First appearance of Dana Elcar as Pete Thornton, Mac's friend and, from season 2 and onward, his boss.
12	12	"Deathlock"	Cliff Bole (opening gambit); Alexander Singer	Jerry Ludwig (opening gambit); Stephen Kandel	January 22, 1986	17.7/26
MacGyver must escape East Berlin in a coffin. Note: This was the last episode to feature an Opening Gambit. When MacGyver is taken to a safe house following an operation, it turns out that the place has been booby trapped by an assassin MacGyver has encountered in the past.
13	13	"Flame's End"	Bruce Seth Green	Story by : Hannah Louise Shearer; Teleplay by : Stephen Kandel	January 29, 1986	16.0/23
An ex girlfriend is in trouble and calls MacGyver when she discovers a plot to steal Uranium from the nuclear processing facility where she works. Guest Star: Robert Englund
14	14	"Countdown"	Stan Jolley	Tony DiMarco & David Ketchum	February 5, 1986	15.2/23
MacGyver teams up with an old buddy from 'Nam to defuse a time bomb aboard a cruise ship loaded with passengers, and identify and apprehend the bomber before he could escape. This episode was inspired by the British suspense film Juggernaut. Guest Star: Dana Elcar as Pete Thornton
15	15	"The Enemy Within"	Cliff Bole	David Abramowitz	February 12, 1986	14.9/22
MacGyver must discover the identity of a mole within the agency who is responsible for the deaths of four top agents.
16	16	"Every Time She Smiles"	Charlie Correll	James Schmerer	February 19, 1986	15.3/23
While trying to escape Bulgaria with secret microfilm, MacGyver meets an American actress who accidentally gets him caught by the secret police. Note: First appearance of Teri Hatcher as Penny Parker.
17	17	"To Be a Man"	Cliff Bole	Don Mankiewicz	March 5, 1986	12.6/19
Sent to Afghanistan to retrieve a downed satellite component, MacGyver is shot down and wounded. He is sheltered by a woman (played by Persis Khambatta) and her son and must rely on their help to escape the Red Army.
18	18	"Ugly Duckling"	Charlie Correll	Larry Gross	March 12, 1986	15.3/23
MacGyver helps out a young genius computer hacker who gets kidnapped by arms dealers who need help with programing stolen missile targeting system. Guest Stars: Melinda O. Fee as Carol Lafferty, Russell Johnson as Oslow, Rob Paulsen as Rogers
19	19	"Slow Death"	Don Weis	Stephen Kandel	April 2, 1986	17.4/27
MacGyver helps Afghan tribesmen who hijack a train in search for two con men who sold them poisons disguised as medicine.
20	20	"The Escape"	Don Chaffey	Stephen Kandel	April 16, 1986	15.7/25
MacGyver cooks up an elaborate plot to break a medical missionary (played by John de Lancie) out of a prison in French North Africa; once they escape, a big surprise awaits.
21	21	"A Prisoner of Conscience"	Cliff Bole	Stephen Kandel	April 30, 1986	13.3/22
MacGyver must fake insanity so that he and Pete can assist a woman to break her political activist father from a secured Russian mental asylum.
22	22	"The Assassin"	Charlie Correll	James Schmerer	May 7, 1986	13.6/24
MacGyver succeeds in capturing a master-disguise/assassin, but now he must impersonate the assassin in order to unravel the latest assassination plot.

== See also ==
- Leiningen Versus the Ants (book that inspired "Trumbo's World")
