= MacGyver (1985 TV series) season 6 =

MacGyver
- Season 6
- "Braver Than Most – Smarter Than the Rest"
- No. of episodes: 21

Release
- Original network: ABC
- Original release: September 17, 1990 – May 6, 1991

Season chronology
- ← Previous; Season 5 Next → Season 7

The sixth season of MacGyver, an American television series, began September 17, 1990, and ended on May 6, 1991. It aired on ABC. The region 1 DVD was released on June 13, 2006.

== Episodes ==
| No. overall | No. in season | Title | Directed by | Written by | Original release date | U.S. viewers (millions) |
|---|---|---|---|---|---|---|
| 105 | 1 | "Tough Boys" | Mike Vejar | Art Washington | September 17, 1990 | 17.7 |
MacGyver tracks youth vigilantes and their leader who are terrorizing the neighborhood crack ring.
| 106 | 2 | "Humanity" | William Gereghty | Lincoln Kibbee | September 24, 1990 | 16.2 |
MacGyver appeals to bring secret files to public view but collides with an elite corpsman loyal to Romania's dead tyrant Ceauşescu.
| 107 | 3 | "The Gun" | William Gereghty | Robert Sherman | October 1, 1990 | 18.6 |
A gun used in an assassination of a politician 20 years ago and a present-day cop killing is sought by both a crazed anarchist and MacGyver, who needs it to clear a friend accused of the shooting.
| 108 | 4 | "Twenty Questions" | Michael Caffey | Rick Mittleman | October 8, 1990 | 20.9 |
MacGyver intervenes for a teenage friend for her alcohol abuse when she is involved in several burglaries.
| 109 | 5 | "The Wall" | Michael Preece | Rick Drew | October 22, 1990 | 17.2 |
MacGyver reunites an East German expatriate with his granddaughter, who might be involved with two ex-Stasi agents.
| 110 | 6 | "Lesson in Evil" | William Gereghty | John Sheppard | October 29, 1990 | 18.3 |
Dr. Zito, the notorious murderer, escapes after a sanity hearing and leaves clues to face off with MacGyver.
| 111 | 7 | "Harry's Will" | William Gereghty | Lincoln Kibbee | November 5, 1990 | 21.7 |
A kooky bunch of crooks and an elderly ex-con pursue MacGyver's inherited station wagon thought to hold a valuable treasure kept hidden by his grandfather. Note: This episode features an unusually wide array of guest stars: Lyle Alzado, John Anderson, Dick Butkus, James Doohan, Henry Gibson, Sandra Gould, Rich Little, Marion Ramsey, Marion Ross, Jesse White, Wendy O. Williams and Abe Vigoda. Executive Producer Henry Winkler also made a cameo appearance as Wilton Newberry, Harry's lawyer, but wasn't credited as the list of guest stars in that episode.
| 112 | 8 | "MacGyver's Women" | Michael Preece | Lincoln Kibbee & Stephen Kandel | November 12, 1990 | 18.8 |
MacGyver dreams he's in the Old West to defend three women from outlaws.
| 113 | 9 | "Bitter Harvest" | Mike Vejar | Michael Kane | November 19, 1990 | 20.0 |
Investigating the murder of a migrant farm worker activist leads MacGyver to a farmer using illegal pesticides.
| 114 | 10 | "The Visitor" | William Gereghty | Brad Radnitz | December 3, 1990 | 22.4 |
A pair of smooth talking "extraterrestrials" promise to transport a desperate rural family to a trouble free planet, for a price. MacGyver is also helped by a mysterious salesman whose reason for helping are unknown.
| 115 | 11 | "Squeeze Play" | Michael Preece | Art Washington | December 17, 1990 | 18.3 |
A baseball counterfeit memorabilia ring kidnaps the daughter of a former baseball player. Only MacGyver, with the help of Ma Colton, can save her in time.
| 116 | 12 | "Jerico Games" | William Gereghty | Robert Sherman | January 7, 1991 | 20.8 |
MacGyver reunites with a high school sweetheart, now the wife of a media mogul sponsoring an international sports competition. When Mac is framed for the man's murder, the identity of the mastermind is one that'll hurt Mac the most.
| 117 | 13 | "The Wasteland" | Michael Caffey | Story by : Grant Rosenberg & Robert Hamner; Teleplay by : Robert Hamner | January 21, 1991 | 19.7 |
MacGyver investigates an out of control industrial developer, while his son and daughter maneuver him out of the family business no matter the cost.
| 118 | 14 | "Eye of Osiris" | Mike Vejar | John Sheppard | February 4, 1991 | 19.7 |
MacGyver helps an archeologist friend find the Eye of Osiris at an archaeological dig but come across unwanted obstacles along the way.
| 119 | 15 | "High Control" | Michael Caffey | Lincoln Kibbee | February 11, 1991 | 19.4 |
MacGyver goes undercover as a biker to help a recent parolee and a friend of Mac's who is getting framed and blackmailed by his old biker gang.
| 120 | 16 | "There but for the Grace" | William Gereghty | John Considine | February 18, 1991 | 20.4 |
MacGyver goes undercover as a homeless person to help find the murderer of a pastor friend of his.
| 121 | 17 | "Blind Faith" | Michael Caffey | John Considine | March 4, 1991 | 15.4 |
Pete has troubles with glaucoma and MacGyver takes his place in getting a video tape from a train that has major political ramifications for a small Latin American country.
| 122 | 18 | "Faith, Hope & Charity" | William Gereghty | Brad Radnitz | March 18, 1991 | 19.3 |
While tracking a gray wolf, MacGyver is caught in a bear trap and found by two elderly sisters who run a bed & breakfast where he recuperates while fending off mobsters who are searching for money stolen from them.
| 123 | 19 | "Strictly Business" | Mike Vejar | John Sheppard | April 8, 1991 | 17.7 |
Murdoc comes out of retirement and tries to clear his almost spotless killing record by killing MacGyver. MacGyver survives Murdoc's first attempt but ends up with amnesia and takes refuge at a remote summer camp with the caretaker and her daughter.
| 124 | 20 | "Trail of Tears" | Michael Preece | Lincoln Kibbee | April 29, 1991 | 16.2 |
A power company tries to run a new power line near an Indian reservation. MacGyver must stop a misguided native activist from taking matters too far.
| 125 | 21 | "Hind-Sight" | Michael Preece | Rick Mittleman | May 6, 1991 | 15.5 |
Pete is awaiting glaucoma surgery and feeling useless, but MacGyver reminds him of why he needs Pete.
