= MacGyver (1985 TV series) season 7 =

MacGyver
- Season 7
- "Back in Action – Ready for Danger"
- No. of episodes: 14

Release
- Original network: ABC
- Original release: September 16, 1991 – May 21, 1992

Season chronology
- ← Previous; Season 6

The seventh and final season of MacGyver, an American television series, began September 16, 1991, and ended on May 21, 1992. It aired on ABC. The region 1 DVD was released on October 24, 2006.

== Episodes ==
No. overall	No. in season	Title	Directed by	Written by	Original release date	U.S. viewers (millions)
126	1	"Honest Abe"	Michael Caffey	Lincoln Kibbee	September 16, 1991	12.9
Preparations to attend his godson's bar mitzvah are interrupted when MacGyver tries to pick up his godson's grandfather Abe (an undercover CIA operative) and gets caught up in Abe's theft of a hi-tech stealth helicopter. A corrupt manufacturer and two undercover federal agents further complicate the mission. Guest stars: Lance LeGault (Colonel Roderick Decker on The A-Team)
127	2	"The 'Hood"	Mike Vejar	Rick Mittleman	September 23, 1991	12.9
The destruction of MacGyver's houseboat forces him into a new neighborhood where he meets a young woman in trouble with hit men.
128	3	"Obsessed"	William Gereghty	John Sheppard	September 30, 1991	14.1
Nightmares about Murdoc affect MacGyver as he provides security at the criminal trial of a deposed dictator. Note: Final appearance of Murdoc.
129	4	"The Prometheus Syndrome"	William Gereghty	Robert Sherman	October 7, 1991	13.4
A psychopathic arsonist kills one of MacGyver's friends. Guest star Randolph Mantooth.
130	5	"The Coltons"	William Gereghty	Story by : Michael Greenburg & Stephen Downing; Teleplay by : Stephen Downing	October 14, 1991	14.7
The Colton bounty hunter brothers search for a young woman who is an important murder witness. Note: This episode was produced for the sixth season, while filming took place in Vancouver, British Columbia (as evidenced in the closing credits). However, for unknown reasons, it was not broadcast until the seventh season. Richard Dean Anderson (MacGyver) is absent for the majority of this episode.
131	6	"Walking Dead"	Michael Preece	Mark Rodgers	October 21, 1991	14.7
A student activist is kidnapped by a Voodoo practitioner, who gathers black civilians for a violence movement. Its up to MacGyver and a neighborhood Voodoo priestess to stop him.
132	7	"Good Knight MacGyver (Part 1)"	Mike Vejar	John Considine	November 4, 1991	14.6
A concussion sends MacGyver to King Arthur's Court, where his strange ways threaten Merlin's magic, but they also save the magician.
133	8	"Good Knight MacGyver (Part 2)"	Mike Vejar	John Considine	November 11, 1991	17.0
MacGyver finishes helping Merlin to free Galahad's Cecilia and stop wicked Morgana.
134	9	"Deadly Silents"	William Gereghty	Brad Radnitz	November 18, 1991	15.1
MacGyver helps a silent movie comedian save the remaining prints of his work which are stolen by a dramatic pair.
135	10	"Split Decision"	Michael Caffey	David Rich	December 2, 1991	14.8
MacGyver's boxer buddy Earl Dent struggles with custody of his daughter, and is blackmailed by bad bookies who want him to throw his comeback fight.
136	11	"Gunz 'N Boyz"	William Gereghty	Art Washington	December 16, 1991	15.4
A Challenger Club youth gets too deep in gang violence.
137	12	"Off the Wall"	Michael Preece	Rick Mittleman	December 30, 1991	17.9
A slumlord unjustly evicts MacGyver's young graffiti artist friend and his grandmother.
138	13	"The Stringer"	Mike Vejar	John Sheppard	April 25, 1992	22.3
MacGyver helps a Chinese dissident and gets help from an unexpected source: his son. Note: Final episode. A voiceover by Richard Dean Anderson at the end of the episode thanks the viewers and closes the series.
139	14	"The Mountain of Youth"	William Gereghty	Brad Radnitz	May 21, 1992	12.3
MacGyver and Jack Dalton search for the fountain of youth. Note: Originally scheduled to be aired before 'The Stringer', it was later released after the final episode.
