= Michael Caffey =

American television director (1930–2017)

- Born: Michael Terrance Caffey; July 14, 1930; San Francisco, California, US
- Died: May 3, 2017 (aged 86); Oregon, US
- Occupation: Television director
- Years active: 1966–1995

Michael Terrance Caffey (born July 14, 1930 – May 5, 2017) was an American television director.

== Early life ==
Michael's parents were Benjamin Franklin Caffey (1902–1983) and Verna Marguerite Caffey (1905–1972).

== Personal life ==
Michael Caffey married Ann Gorey in 1949. Together they have 13 children. One of his children is Charlotte Caffey an American rock and roll guitarist and songwriter, best known for her work in the Go-Go's in the 1980s, including writing "We Got the Beat." Via Charlotte he is the father in law of the Redd Kross singer and guitarist, Jeff McDonald. Another child is Thomas Caffey who composes music for films. Thomas' most recent work was the trailer for 10,000 BC. One of his youngest children is Joyce Caffey who owns Ultrasonic Music in Los Angeles, California.

Michael Caffey owned Bird Rock Island. The Island surrounds Bird Rock State Marine Conservation Area.

== Film career ==
He began his career as an editor on The Ten Commandments.

He was a director on the following television shows: B.J. and the Bear, Barnaby Jones, Bert D'Angelo/Superstar, Chicago Story, Dan August, Freebie and the Bean, Hagen, Grandpa Goes to Washington, Hawaii Five-O, Here's Boomer, It Takes a Thief, Kingston: Confidential, Legend, Legmen, The Young Rebels, The Name of the Game, Garrison's Gorillas, Hondo, Judd for the Defense, M.A.N.T.I.S., Manhunter, Mannix, Search, Serpico, The Rookies, The Bold Ones: The New Doctors, The Interns, The Immortal, Sword of Justice, The Hardy Boys Mysteries, The Streets of San Francisco, Hawkeye, Guns of Paradise, Paradise, Cagney & Lacey, The Wizard, Simon & Simon The Adventures of Bricso County Jr., The Amazing Spider-Man, Cannon, The F.B.I., The Doctors, The Master, The Mod Squad, The Nancy Drew Mysteries, The Wild Wild West, Two Marriages, Enos, Kay O'Brien, Kolchak: The Night Stalker, Buck Rogers in the 25th Century, Paris 7000, The Gemini Man, Trapper John, M.D., Crazy Like A Fox, High Performance, CHiPs, T.J. Hooker, Time Express, Emergency Plus Four, Logan's Run, The Survivors, The Hanged Man, Seven in Darkness, The Devil and Miss Sarah and The Silent Gun.
