= MacGyver (1985 TV series) =

American action-adventue television series (1985–1992)

- Genre: Action; Adventure; Spy fiction
- Created by: Lee David Zlotoff
- Starring: Richard Dean Anderson; Dana Elcar
- Narrated by: Richard Dean Anderson
- Theme music composer: Randy Edelman
- Country of origin: United States
- Original language: English
- No. of seasons: 7
- No. of episodes: 139 + 2 TV films (list of episodes)

Production
- Executive producers: Henry Winkler; John Rich
- Production locations: California, United States; Vancouver and Burnaby, British Columbia, Canada
- Running time: 45–48 minutes
- Production companies: Henry Winkler-John Rich Productions; Paramount Network Television

Original release
- Network: ABC
- Release: September 29, 1985 – May 21, 1992

Related
- MacGyver (2016 series) (2016–2021)

MacGyver is an American action-adventure television series created by Lee David Zlotoff and starring Richard Dean Anderson as the title character. Henry Winkler and John Rich were the executive producers. The series follows the adventures of Angus MacGyver, a secret agent armed with remarkable scientific resourcefulness to solve any problem out in the field using any materials at hand.

The show ran for seven seasons on ABC in the United States and various other networks abroad from 1985 to 1992. The series was filmed in Los Angeles during seasons one, two and seven, and in Vancouver during seasons three through six. The show's final episode aired on April 25, 1992, on ABC (the network aired a previously unseen episode for the first time on May 21, 1992, but it was originally intended to air before the series finale).

The series was a ratings success and gained a loyal following. It was popular in the United States and around the world. Two television films, Lost Treasure of Atlantis and Trail to Doomsday, aired on ABC in 1994. A spin-off series, Young MacGyver, was planned in 2003, but only the pilot was made. Merchandise for MacGyver includes games, toys, print media and an original audio series. A reboot series was broadcast on CBS from 2016 to 2021, which today owns the rights to the original series through its acquisition of the original Paramount Television.

== Plot ==
The show follows Angus MacGyver, played by Richard Dean Anderson, who works as a troubleshooter for the fictional Phoenix Foundation in Los Angeles and as an agent for a fictional United States government agency, the Department of External Services (DXS). Educated as a scientist in Physics at Western Tech ("Hell Week"), MacGyver served in the U.S. Army Special Forces as a Bomb Team Technician/EOD during the Vietnam War ("Countdown"). Resourceful and possessing an encyclopedic knowledge of the physical sciences, he solves complex problems by making things out of ordinary objects, along with his ever-present Swiss Army knife, duct tape, and occasionally matches. He favors non-violent resolutions and prefers not to handle firearms due to the accidental shooting death of one of his friends when he was 12.

His main asset is his practical application of scientific knowledge and inventive use of common items. The clever solutions MacGyver implemented to seemingly unsolvable problems‍—‌often in life-or-death situations requiring him to improvise complex devices in a matter of minutes‍—‌were a major attraction of the show, which helped generate interest in the applied sciences, including engineering, and for providing entertaining storylines. All of MacGyver's exploits on the show were ostensibly vetted by consulting scientists for the show's writers to ensure a basis on scientific principles. In the few cases where MacGyver used household chemicals to mix poisons, explosives or other items deemed too dangerous to be accurately described to the public, details were altered or left vague or an essential component or step was omitted.

The show often dealt with social issues, though more so in seasons 4–7 than 1–3, which were mostly about MacGyver's adventures working for the United States government and later for the Phoenix Foundation.

== Episodes ==
| Season | Episodes | Originally released | |
| Season | Episodes | First released | Last released |
|---|---|---|---|
| 1 | 22 | September 29, 1985 | May 7, 1986 |
| 2 | 22 | September 22, 1986 | May 4, 1987 |
| 3 | 20 | September 21, 1987 | May 9, 1988 |
| 4 | 19 | October 31, 1988 | May 15, 1989 |
| 5 | 21 | September 18, 1989 | April 30, 1990 |
| 6 | 21 | September 17, 1990 | May 6, 1991 |
| 7 | 14 | September 16, 1991 | May 21, 1992 |
| TV films | 2 | May 14, 1994 | November 24, 1994 |

Several episodes, including the pilot, begin with a cold open, finding MacGyver already on a mission. MacGyver often narrates a story from his childhood relating to his current situation. He resolves this situation quickly, and the main story commences after the opening credits. The credits refer to such an opening sequence as the "Opening Gambit"‍—‌it occurs far more commonly in earlier episodes than in later ones. This segment is often written and directed by a different team than the main story of the episode. After the credits, the main story plays out in standard three-act structure. In many episodes, the opening sequence occurs after the opening credits and often does not involve MacGyver on a mission but rather in a situation used for character development. In the same manner as the "Opening Gambit" sequences, these opening segments often do not directly relate to the main story.

== Cast ==
- Richard Dean Anderson as Angus MacGyver, a secret agent for the Los Angeles–based Phoenix Foundation who prefers a thoughtful approach to assignments over violence.
- Dana Elcar as Pete Thornton, MacGyver's boss and best friend. He was an operative at the Department of External Services (DXS), which is where he is impressed by Mac's ingenuity while tracking down Murdoc (Michael Des Barres), an international assassin and master of disguise. When Thornton becomes director of operations at the Phoenix Foundation several years later, he brings MacGyver into the program. In addition to sending Mac out on various tasks for the foundation, Thornton is many times forced to bail MacGyver out of the trouble he gets into, while at the same time being clueless and lacking street-smarts while in the field. Thornton has a son named Michael. Late in the show, it is learned that Pete has glaucoma, an element written in because of Elcar developing glaucoma in real life. Dana Elcar is first cast in the pilot episode as Andy Colson, the Chief of Operations at the KIVA Laboratories.
- Bruce McGill as Jack Dalton, MacGyver's comical best friend. He is a soldier of fortune/bush pilot who periodically gets everyone into a heap of trouble with various get rich quick schemes out of which only MacGyver can rescue them. His left eye twitches when he is lying. Dalton often attempts to romance the women he is introduced to.

== Production ==
=== Development ===
While creating the series MacGyver, John Rich was working on the sitcom Mr. Sunshine for ABC, which was short-lived and cancelled quickly. Henry Winkler had just finished off his eleven-year run on Happy Days and was looking for another project. Lee David Zlotoff was working as a producer for Remington Steele, which was airing on NBC. The three got together to form the basis for MacGyver and sold the idea to Paramount, and ABC became interested in the series. Vin DiBona, the producer of America's Funniest Videos, was also in the mix during early production of the show.

=== Filming ===
The series was filmed in Southern California for its first two seasons and again in its final season. From seasons 3 to 6, it was filmed in various locations around Vancouver in British Columbia, Canada. Los Angeles remained as the setting of the show for the entire duration. The move to Vancouver was due to the threat of the series being cancelled due to the high production cost. In seasons 1 and 2, MacGyver was portrayed living in a waterfront apartment in Venice Beach. In season 3, he moved onto a houseboat at an unspecified location, though implied still to be in Los Angeles (the actual shooting took place at Coal Harbour, near downtown Vancouver). Filming returned to Los Angeles for the final season.

=== Casting ===
When the series was in pre-production, Winkler and Rich were looking for a suitable actor for the lead. After Richard Dean Anderson's appearance in the American television series The Love Boat, Winkler got Anderson to audition for the part. According to Rich, every auditioning actor "hulked" his way through his audition. When Anderson eventually auditioned for the role, Winkler and Rich felt that he gave the character a human touch which the other actors could not. Both believed that Anderson would become one of the new "breakout" stars on American television.

Anderson is known for having done many of the stunts in the series, though in later seasons he reduced his participation because of accumulating injuries. He injured his back and required foot surgery because of accidents working as a stuntman.

== Broadcast history ==
After a slow start in its first season, MacGyver became a sleeper hit for ABC in its second season, during which it began a six-year run as the lead-in to ABC's Monday Night Football (the longest such run in history). During the show's fourth season, Richard Dean Anderson complained that ABC was not marketing the series enough. Saying that the series is "just another action show" for ABC, he further stated that ABC did not give the series enough promotion.

MacGyver's seventh season was abbreviated. After the twelfth episode of the season aired on December 30, 1991, MacGyver disappeared from the ABC schedule and did not return until April 25, 1992, by which point the series had been canceled. The finale aired that night, with a previously unaired episode following on May 21, 1992. When asked why the series was canceled, Anderson replied: "The only reason it went off the air was that everybody was ready to move on. I was physically exhausted and had no life."

=== Ratings ===
| Season | Episodes | First aired | Last aired | Time slot | Rank | Rating |
|---|---|---|---|---|---|---|
| 1 | 22 | September 29, 1985 | May 7, 1986 | Sunday at 8:00 p.m. Wednesday at 8:00 p.m. | #47 | 14.6 |
| 2 | 22 | September 22, 1986 | May 4, 1987 | Monday at 8:00 p.m. | #45 | 14.6 |
| 3 | 20 | September 21, 1987 | May 9, 1988 | Monday at 8:00 p.m. | #53 | 12.9 |
| 4 | 19 | October 31, 1988 | May 15, 1989 | Monday at 8:00 p.m. | #42 | 13.6 |
| 5 | 21 | September 18, 1989 | April 30, 1990 | Monday at 8:00 p.m. | #47 | 12.3 |
| 6 | 21 | September 17, 1990 | May 6, 1991 | Monday at 8:00 p.m. | #52 | 11.5 |
| 7 | 14 | September 16, 1991 | May 21, 1992 | Monday at 8:00 p.m. | #64 | 9.6 |

=== TV films ===
In 1994, the series was released in over 70 different worldwide markets. Because of popular demand, two TV movies were created, both released in 1994. The first movie, MacGyver: Lost Treasure of Atlantis, premiered in the United States in May. The film was shot in England and Greece. The second movie was entitled MacGyver: Trail to Doomsday, and shot in England. Anderson served as executive producer for both films, which were filmed in Europe.

== Syndication and home media ==
Reruns of the series still air in North America, Europe, Australia, Asia, Costa Rica and Ethiopia. Alongside local syndication, reruns aired on the USA Network from 1990 to 1997, on WGN America from 1998 to 2002, on TV Land from January 2003 to 2006, on Spike for a brief time in 2005. It is formerly aired on Cloo (2011–2017) with marathon blocks shown on the weekends and on May 13, 2015, Esquire Network started airing reruns of the series. MeTV Network had acquired the rights to air the series as of December 2, 2015. It aired weekday afternoons & weeknights on MeTV from 12/19/16-5/26/17.

On June 15, 2010, Paramount released the two TV movies on DVD in Region 1 in a separate single-disc release entitled MacGyver – The TV Movies.

On January 13, 2015, CBS Home Entertainment announced they would release a repackaged version of the complete series set on DVD in Region 1, at a lower price, on April 7.

| DVD/BLU RAY TITLE | Region 1/A (United States) |
|---|---|
| The Complete First Season | January 25, 2005 |
| The Complete Second Season | June 7, 2005 |
| The Complete Third Season | September 6, 2005 |
| The Complete Fourth Season | December 6, 2005 |
| The Complete Fifth Season | March 14, 2006 |
| The Complete Sixth Season | June 13, 2006 |
| The Final Season | October 24, 2006 |
| The TV Movies | June 15, 2010 |
| The Complete Series (39 Disc Set) | July 30, 2009 |
| The Complete Collection (38 Disc Set) | April 7, 2015 |
| The Complete Collection (33 Blu-Ray Disc Set) | November 2, 2021 |

=== High definition remaster ===
In June 2018, CBS announced that the original camera negatives, thought to be lost, had been located and a high definition remaster of the series was underway. The June 21 press release confirmed that the first three seasons had been completed, with the remaining four to be remastered before the end of 2018. The press release also included a teaser showcasing the notable improvement in quality.

== Impact ==
The series is referenced in episodes of The Simpsons, primarily detailing the obsession Marge Simpson's sisters (Patty and Selma) have with the show and their crush on the MacGyver character. The sisters' regular viewing of the show is an unalterable element of their daily schedule to the point of death as demonstrated in the episode "Black Widower". The episode featured a fictional scene of MacGyver where he downplays his role in saving a village. ("Don't thank me. Thank the moon's gravitational pull.")

In the first episode of Anderson's later show, Stargate SG-1, Amanda Tapping ad-libbed that the Air Force had to "MacGyver" a Dial Home Device for the Stargate, and a split-second shot following this shows Anderson "flashing an understated wry smile" in response; the producers, including Anderson, "loved it" and Anderson later stated "I thought it was brilliant". (However, this line was removed when this episode was re-released in 2009.)

In 2006, Anderson appeared in a MasterCard television commercial for Super Bowl XL. In it, he manages to cut the ropes binding him to a chair using a pine tree air freshener, uses an ordinary tube sock as the pulley for a zip-line, and somehow repairs and hot-wires a nonfunctional truck using a paper clip, ballpoint pen, rubber band, tweezers, nasal spray, and a turkey baster. In contrast to previous MasterCard commercials showing people making extravagant purchases to accomplish some mundane task, MacGyver is portrayed as escaping from some sort of deathtrap using less than $20 worth of common household items. The commercial ends by showing him purposefully buying an assortment of such things at a department store with his credit card (as a tongue-in-cheek explanation for how he seems to always have items he needs on hand no matter where he goes). Although the commercial implies that Anderson is portraying MacGyver, he is not identified.

In an August 2007 survey commissioned by the McCormick Tribune Foundation, Americans polled voted MacGyver as the favorite fictional hero they would want to have if they were ever caught in an emergency.

In 2008, the phrase "What would MacGyver do?" was used in a New Zealand television commercial for Gregg's "freestyle cooking" range of herbs and spices. The commercial featured the word MacGyver unfolding like a puzzle with a potato peeler and chopping knife opening out like the blades of a Swiss Army knife.

=== "MacGyver" and "MacGyverism" ===
MacGyver employs his resourcefulness and his science, technology, and outdoorsmanship, and sportsmanship to resolve what are often life-or-death crises. He creates inventions from simple items to solve these problems, relying on only a Swiss Army knife and duct tape, instead of high-tech weapons and equipment like typical secret-agent show characters. These inventions became synonymous with the character and were called MacGyverisms by fans. The writers of the show based the inventions on ideas from scientific advisers, real events, items found on location, and ideas submitted by fans in a contest with prize money. MacGyverism was first said on the show by the character Joanne Remmings in "Twice Stung" (season 2, episode 3).

MacGyverism led to the verb to MacGyver. In 1989, Richard Dean Anderson discussed this term on The Arsenio Hall Show; Hall had heard it used to mean 'to do the impossible', and suggested it belonged in a dictionary. MacGyver entered the Oxford Dictionaries website in 2015 as a verb meaning "make or repair (an object) in an improvised or inventive way, making use of whatever items are at hand".

=== Awards and nominations ===
Awards and nominations received by MacGyver
| Award | Year | Category | Nominee | Episode | Result |
|---|---|---|---|---|---|
| BMI Film & TV Awards | 1991 | BMI TV Music Award | Randy Edelman | | Won |
| Emmy Awards | 1987 | Outstanding Achievement in Makeup for a Series | Rolf John Keppler, Michael Westmore, Robert Norin | "Friends" | Nominated |
| Emmy Awards | 1989 | Outstanding Sound Editing for a Series | William H. Angarola, Miguel Rivera, Barbara Issak, Jon Johnson, Keith Bilderbeck, Art Ottinger, Steve Danforth | "Gold Rush" | Nominated |
| Emmy Awards | 1990 | Outstanding Sound Editing for a Series | William H. Angarola, Miguel Rivera, Barbara Issak, George Nemzer, Guy Tsujimoto, David Long, Steve Danforth | "The Lost Amadeus" | Nominated |
| Emmy Awards | 1992 | Outstanding Individual Achievement in Costuming for a Series | Thomas Welsh, Bernadette O'Brien | "Good Knight MacGyver", part I | Nominated |
| Genesis Awards | 1991 | Best TV - Drama | Paul B. Margolis, Henry Winkler | – | Won |
| TV Land Awards | 2005 | Greatest Gear or Admirable Apparatus | Richard Dean Anderson | — | Nominated |
| TV Land Awards | 2007 | Most Uninsurable Driver | Richard Dean Anderson | — | Nominated |
| Young Artist Awards | 1990 | Best Young Actor Guest Starring in a Television Series | Cuba Gooding Jr. | – | Nominated |
| Young Artist Awards | 1990 | Best Young Actress Guest Starring in a Television Series | Holly Fields | – | Nominated |

== Failed reboot ==
Jared Padalecki was part of a failed pilot for a MacGyver show.

== 2016 CBS reboot series ==
In October 2015, the original series' executive producer, Henry Winkler, signed on to produce a reboot series with James Wan and R. Scott Gemmill for CBS.

In March 2016, Lucas Till was announced as the new MacGyver, Joshua Boone as Gunner, MacGyver's best friend from high school, former CSI star George Eads as Lincoln (later renamed as Jack Dalton), a man who could easily be written off as an eccentric conspiracy theorist but is a legitimate government employee with great capability for compassion, Addison Timlin as Mickey, an app developer who is aggressively progressive in her political views, with a soft spot for MacGyver, and Michelle Krusiec as Agent Croix, Lincoln's sister who works for the Department of Homeland Security.

The following May, the network picked up the series, with co-creator/exec producer Peter Lenkov to serve as showrunner, and indicated that the new series would air later that year. That June, however, the network scrapped the pilot episode and ordered a new pilot be directed by Wan with Till and Eads remaining in the cast. Justin Hires was cast as Wilt Bozer, MacGyver's roommate. In June, Variety reported that Sandrine Holt was cast as Patricia Thornton, an ex-field agent who is now director of operations for the Department of External Services, and that Tristin Mays was cast as Riley Davis, a highly unpredictable computer hacker with a chip on her shoulder.

The rebooted show ran until 2021, when it was cancelled.

== In other media ==
=== Mobile game ===
A 3D puzzle game based on the TV series titled MacGyver: Deadly Descent was released on iOS and Android.

=== MacGyver and the New Citan ===
Anderson reprised his role as MacGyver in September 2012 in a new series of short films, created by Mercedes-Benz for the launch of their new MPV Citan in Europe.

=== Comic book ===
The comic book was very well received around the world with the first issue selling out within the first two weeks and received mostly favorable reviews through major comic book sites. However, the series' lead author, Tony Lee, confirmed in September 2014 that the series in total did not sell well enough to warrant a second series.

=== Novel series ===
In 2022, series creator Lee David Zlotoff and author Eric Kelley collaborated on the first novel based on the series, MacGyver: Meltdown. The novel and its followup, 2024's MacGyver: Seismic Shift, are continuations of the television series and see MacGyver once again working for the United States government.

== See also ==
- List of MacGyver (1985 TV series) episodes
- Life hacking – Trick to make life easier
- Bush mechanic
- Shadetree mechanic – Auto mechanic with minimal equipment
