= Charles Correll (director) =

American television director and cinematographer

- Born: Charles James Correll Jr. January 23, 1944; Los Angeles, California, U.S.
- Died: June 4, 2004 (aged 60); Tarzana, California, U.S.
- Occupation(s): Director, Cinematographer, Actor
- Known for: Without a Trace
- Spouse: Robin Kellick
- Children: 3

Charles Correll Jr. (January 23, 1944 – June 4, 2004) was an American television director and cinematographer. The son of Charles Correll Sr. of the sitcom Amos & Andy, his brother is Richard Correll, a former child actor and later a television director.

== Death ==
He died of pancreatic cancer on June 4, 2004, in Los Angeles, California. He was survived by his wife Robin with two daughters and a son.

== Filmography ==
=== Director ===
Year	Film	Role	Other notes
1978	National Lampoon's Animal House	Cinematographer	
1979	Portrait of a Hitman	Cinematographer	
1984	Star Trek III: The Search for Spock	Cinematographer	
1985	Wallenberg: A Hero's Story	Cinematographer	
1986–1990	MacGyver	Director	19 episodes
1987	Revenge of the Nerds II: Nerds in Paradise	Cinematographer	
1993	Mother of the Bride	Director	
1990–1993	Law & Order	Director	2 episodes
1996–2000	Beverly Hills, 90210	Director	7 episodes
1993–1999	Melrose Place	Director	47 episodes
2001–2002	CSI: Crime Scene Investigation	Director	3 episodes
2002–2003	CSI: Miami	Director	3 episodes
2003–2004	Without a Trace	Director	3 episodes

=== Actor ===
Year	Film	Role	Other notes
1984	Star Trek III: The Search for Spock	Space Dock Worker	Cameo, Uncredited
