= Murdoc =

Fictional character from the TV series MacGyver

- MacGyver character
- First appearance: "Partners" (season 2)
- Last appearance: "Obsessed" (season 7)
- Created by: Lee David Zlotoff
- Portrayed by: Michael Des Barres

In-universe information
- Gender: Male
- Occupation: Assassin
- Family: Ashton (sister)

Murdoc is a fictional character that appears in the ABC television series MacGyver and in the CBS reboot series of the same name. In both portrayals, Murdoc is an assassin and frequent antagonist of both series.

== Original series ==
Murdoc is played by Michael Des Barres. Murdoc is an assassin working for the Homicide International Trust, an international group of assassins. He appears in a total of nine episodes, being the most frequent antagonist of the series and one of the very few to make recurring appearances.

== Character ==
Murdoc is Angus MacGyver's most frequent opponent, a member of Homicide International Trust (HIT) and master assassin who never fails – except when MacGyver gets involved. Murdoc is an accomplished pianist, a master of disguise, as well as creative and highly skilled in the use of booby traps. He is also fond of heavy weapons, including flamethrowers, bazookas, and dynamite. Murdoc's signature for each hit is to take photographs of his victim at the moment of their death. MacGyver first encountered Murdoc in 1980: Murdoc (disguised as a woman named Sarah) was being followed by Peter Thornton, and (after originally helping Murdoc escape by mistake) MacGyver saves Pete (and himself) from being blown up by two of Murdoc's helpers. Their interaction convinces Pete to hire MacGyver to work with him at the DXS. At the end of this encounter, Murdoc had apparently been killed.

Murdoc's next appearance is seven years later; he has resurfaced to take revenge on MacGyver for foiling his plans during their first encounter. Murdoc's revenge scheme not only fails, but once again results in his apparent death. This became a recurring theme with the character: resurfacing after an apparent death, only to fail and appear to die again. This "near death" cycle occurred a total of six times throughout the series. He has survived, among other things, falling down an abandoned mine shaft, driving off a cliff in a car that exploded upon impact, having a collapsing building fall on him, being electrocuted and falling into a pool of flaming water, and falling thousands of feet off the sheer face of a mountain. His body was never found.

Murdoc always screams "MacGyver!" at the moment of his "death", except in episode "Halloween Knights", where he and MacGyver act as allies. When Murdoc tried to retire following his repeated failures to deal with MacGyver, HIT refused to let him go, instead putting a hit out on him and eventually holding his sister hostage in an attempt to bring him in. To rescue her, Murdoc is forced to seek MacGyver's help. In this episode, it is revealed that he is terrified of snakes.

He has over-the-top disguises and weapons complemented by a maniacal-smile persona that offer a touch of comic relief to the series. One signature giveaway is his wearing a death's head ring. He gets childlike joy from taunting his victims before he kills them using elaborate traps (which MacGyver can just manage to escape).

== Chronology ==
No. overall	Appearance	Title	Directed by	Written by	Original release date
40	2	"Partners"	Cliff Bole	Mark Lisson & Bill Froehlich	March 2, 1987
Murdoc lures MacGyver and Pete into a trap; while trying to escape they flashback over their previous encounters with him.
52	3	"The Widowmaker"	Mike Vejar	Story by : Harv Zimmel; Teleplay by : John Whelpley	November 16, 1987
While grieving over the loss of a friend on the mountain called Widowmaker, MacGyver's old nemesis, Murdoc, finds him and tries to end what he started years ago. Unknown to MacGyver and Nikki, Murdoc survives after falling off the mountain.
73	4	"Cleo Rocks"	Chuck Bowman	John Sheppard & Rick Drew	February 6, 1989
A shadowy figure lurks in a theater backstage to manipulate Penny Parker in a suspicious rock musical. Murdoc disguises himself as a director named Jacques Leroux. MacGyver finds out that Murdoc is still alive when he decodes a death-themed poem. Murdoc falls into a fiery pool while fighting against MacGyver, but he subsequently survives it.
89	5	"Halloween Knights"	Charlie Correll	John Sheppard	October 30, 1989
Murdoc forges an uneasy alliance with MacGyver to free his innocent sister, who is held captive by a vengeful mentor and his organization of assassins.
123	6	"Strictly Business"	Mike Vejar	John Sheppard	April 8, 1991
Murdoc comes out of retirement and tries to clear his almost spotless killing record by killing MacGyver; MacGyver ends up with amnesia on a remote farm.
128	7	"Obsessed"	William Gereghty	John Sheppard	September 30, 1991
Nightmares about Murdoc affect MacGyver as he provides security at the criminal trial of a deposed dictator. In the last phone scene, Murdoc was alive.

== Other appearances ==
No. overall	Appearance	Title	Directed by	Written by	Original release date
83	4	"Unfinished Business"	Charlie Correll	Marianne Clarkson	May 15, 1989
MacGyver, Peter Thornton and Jack Dalton are stalked by a former female foe of MacGyver with business to finish with him. Murdoc appears in flashbacks only, from this season's Cleo Rocks appearance.
95	5	"Serenity"	William Gereghty	Stephen Kandel	January 8, 1990
Exhausted from work, MacGyver falls asleep and dreams that he is in the Old West aiming to retire with a claim to a Montana ranch home, although trouble soon starts with neighboring landowner Pete Thornton and his hired mercenary, Murdoc. Murdoc appears in MacGyver's dream as a hired mercenary in his only non-canon appearance.
125	6	"Hind-Sight"	Michael Preece	Rick Mittleman	May 6, 1991
Pete is awaiting glaucoma surgery and feeling useless, but MacGyver reminds him of why he needs Pete. Murdoc appears in flashbacks only.

== 2016 series ==
Murdoc
- MacGyver (2016) character
- First appearance: "Corkscrew" (season 1)
- Created by: Lee David Zlotoff
- Portrayed by: David Dastmalchian

In-universe information
- Full name: Dennis
- Aliases: Murdoc; Suspect 218
- Gender: Male
- Occupation: Assassin
- Children: Cassian (son)
- Nationality: American
- Abilities: Master Assassin; Threat Elimination; Weapons Training; Close quarters combat; Hand-to-hand combat; Weapon improvisation; Master of disguise; Trap making; Espionage; Awareness training; Impersonation; Bomb making; Hunting

Murdoc is played by David Dastmalchian. As with the original series Murdoc is Angus MacGyver's frequent opponent who never fails – except when MacGyver gets involved, a master of disguise, creative and highly skilled in the use of booby traps, and fond of weapons. However, in this series he is initially a lone master assassin who later attempts to build a "Collective" recruiting other highly skilled assassins towards this goal.

=== Character biography ===
Nothing is initially known about Murdoc's childhood, but he later states that as a child he would rip the legs off spiders and then squish them for fun. He also claims his father was abusive and that he killed him.

When Murdoc was in his early 20s he failed the psychiatric tests when attempting to enlist in the Army, and started working within foreign militaries in order to fulfill his desire to shoot and kill people.

Eventually he was mentored by an assassin named Nicolas Helman, who Murdoc tells MacGyver and Jack Dalton he considers an even deadlier individual than himself. They end their partnership and later Murdoc accidentally killed Helman's wife during a shootout between them.

After becoming an assassin, but over a decade before his first encounter with MacGyver, Murdoc met a woman named Nadia who became pregnant with his child and fell in love with him while he only felt she was "less repulsive than most humans". Soon after giving birth to their child, Murdoc smothered her to death using a pillow, revealing she was his intended target all along.

MacGyver's first known encounter with Murdoc is when Murdoc was hired to assassinate MacGyver by an initially unknown individual. He is then known as the international assassin Suspect 218, until he is formally introduced in his meeting of MacGyver's roommate Wilt Bozer and later to MacGyver himself.

Murdoc is able to deceive Bozer long enough to enter MacGyver's home by pretending to be a "friend from work" there to see him. During a phone call MacGyver warns Bozer about Murdoc and his likely true intentions to kill him until Murdoc forces Bozer to end the call. Murdoc then subdues Bozer and uses one of Bozer's movie masks to hide his appearance when MacGyver returns. Murdoc is able to get the rest of MacGyver's Phoenix Team as hostages and demands that MacGyver surrender to him or he would kill the team. After a final showdown between the two, Murdoc loses and is arrested by the Phoenix Foundation. At this time he refuses to reveal any other identity, and states he is Murdoc; this is actually the name of a previous victim, but the only name he will give them.

Murdoc's next appearance is later that year; Riley Davis and Bozer visit him in prison to determine the identity of the mole within the Phoenix Foundation. Murdoc states he will not give them any information until they get him a rare first edition book. They do and Murdoc assists them by giving them all the information he has.

Murdoc later helps MacGyver to impersonate him in order to find an individual being targeted and the person requesting the assassination. During the course of this event it is revealed that the leader of Phoenix, Matilda Webber, had found out about his now teenage son, Cassian, who attends an exclusive private school in Switzerland. It is further revealed that while Murdoc does care for Cassian, sending him presents and keeping him safe, Cassian is unaware of his father's career as an assassin.

At the end of the first season it is discovered that Murdoc was able to secretly hire an assassin to enter the Phoenix Foundation headquarters in disguise to get revenge on MacGyver and team. While the entire team does survive the hired assassin, Murdoc is able to kill his prison guard and escape prison.

During their next encounter Murdoc drugs and kidnaps MacGyver, holding him in an abandoned warehouse basement and demanding to know Cassian's location. While MacGyver argues that Cassian would dislike him for what he has done, Murdoc responds saying "boys need their fathers" and uses MacGyver's recent searching for his father as proof. However, MacGyver refuses to disclose his location and eventually Murdoc leaves the room giving MacGyver an opportunity to escape through sewer tunnels. When the Phoenix Foundation agents arrive they find a picture of a man named Henry Fletcher and assume he is a new target. While the team is at the warehouse, Murdoc calls Samantha Cage on the phone and after a brief conversation about their similarities, including the use of false names (something her team seems unaware of), he shoots Cage with a sniper rifle. It is soon discovered that Cage was wearing a bulletproof vest and survives.

The team then determines that Fletcher is a professor who also is employed covertly as an assassin who makes his victims disappear. After arresting Fletcher, Murdoc frees Fletcher from a transport vehicle by using a rocket launcher, and leaves MacGyver trapped in the wreckage. After Murdoc rescues Fletcher, he requests that he be his first recruit into his "collective" of assassins.

After finding out Cage survived his earlier attempt to kill her, Murdoc makes a second attempt. This time he shot her at close range and left her to die alone. However, she was able to call MacGyver, who got her to a hospital where she recovered.

Later Henry Fletcher requests and succeeds in receiving $10 million to hand Murdoc over to the Phoenix Foundation. After trading, Helman shows back up seeking revenge for killing his wife and reveals that Murdoc's real first name is Dennis. Murdoc is able to get away while they are hiding and during a moment when MacGyver is left alone by Dalton, both Murdoc and Helman reappear and Murdoc shoots MacGyver in the shoulder to get him out of the way and then kills Helman. He then surrenders and requests to see his son in return for saving MacGyver's life. When he sees Cassian he asks him to put on an earlier present he sent him, headphones, and turn up his favorite song as loud as he wants. While his son is distracted he kills the guards using a pencil sharpener blade and flees with his son. He then drives to Fletcher's apartment and kills him after implying his plan is to kill all those members of his Collective that betrayed him.

== Cameo ==
The original Murdoc, Michael Des Barres, portrayed Murdoc's mentor, Nicolas Helman, in the 2016 series.
