= List of MacGyver (1985 TV series) episodes =

MacGyver is an American action-adventure television series created by Lee David Zlotoff and Henry Winkler. The show ran for seven seasons on ABC in the United States and various other networks abroad from 1985 to 1992.

The pilot episode was first aired in the United States on September 29, 1985. The show's final episode aired on April 25, 1992, on ABC (the network aired a previously unseen episode for the first time on May 21, 1992, but it was originally intended to air before the series finale). Two television movies, MacGyver: Lost Treasure of Atlantis and MacGyver: Trail to Doomsday, aired on ABC in 1994.

== Series overview ==
Season	Episodes	Originally released	
Season	Episodes	First released	Last released
1	22	September 29, 1985	May 7, 1986
2	22	September 22, 1986	May 4, 1987
3	20	September 21, 1987	May 9, 1988
4	19	October 31, 1988	May 15, 1989
5	21	September 18, 1989	April 30, 1990
6	21	September 17, 1990	May 6, 1991
7	14	September 16, 1991	May 21, 1992
TV films	2	May 14, 1994	November 24, 1994

== Episodes ==
=== Season 1 (1985–86) ===
No. overall	No. in season	Title	Directed by	Written by	Original release date	Rating/share (households)
1	1	"Pilot"	Jerrold Freedman (as Alan Smithee)	Thackary Pallor	September 29, 1985	10.9/17
2	2	"The Golden Triangle"	Donald Petrie (opening gambit); Paul Stanley	Terry Nation (opening gambit); Dennis Foley	October 6, 1985	12.2/19
3	3	"Thief of Budapest"	Lee H. Katzin (opening gambit); John Patterson	Terry Nation & Stephen Downing (opening gambit); Joe Viola	October 13, 1985	13.0/19
4	4	"The Gauntlet"	Lee H. Katzin	Judy Burns (opening gambit); Stephen Kandel	October 21, 1985	14.3/22
5	5	"The Heist"	? (as Alan Smithee)	Story by : Larry Alexander & James Schmerer; Teleplay by : James Schmerer	November 3, 1985	14.3/20
6	6	"Trumbo's World"	Lee H. Katzin (opening gambit); Donald Petrie	Stephen Kandel	November 10, 1985	15.6/22
7	7	"Last Stand"	John Florea	Judy Burns	November 17, 1985	15.8/22
8	8	"Hellfire"	Richard Colla	Story by : Douglas Brooks West; Teleplay by : Stephen Kandel & James Schmerer & Douglas Brooks West	November 27, 1985	13.1/21
9	9	"The Prodigal"	Alexander Singer	Story by : David Abramowitz & Paul Savage; Teleplay by : David Abramowitz	December 8, 1985	11.6/17
10	10	"Target MacGyver"	Lee H. Katzin (opening gambit); Ernest Pintoff	Terry Nation (opening gambit); Story by : Mike Marvin; Teleplay by : Stephen Kandel & Mike Marvin & James Schmerer	December 22, 1985	13.2/21
11	11	"Nightmares"	Cliff Bole	James Schmerer	January 15, 1986	15.9/23
12	12	"Deathlock"	Cliff Bole (opening gambit); Alexander Singer	Jerry Ludwig (opening gambit); Stephen Kandel	January 22, 1986	17.7/26
13	13	"Flame's End"	Bruce Seth Green	Story by : Hannah Louise Shearer; Teleplay by : Stephen Kandel	January 29, 1986	16.0/23
14	14	"Countdown"	Stan Jolley	Tony DiMarco & David Ketchum	February 5, 1986	15.2/23
15	15	"The Enemy Within"	Cliff Bole	David Abramowitz	February 12, 1986	14.9/22
16	16	"Every Time She Smiles"	Charlie Correll	James Schmerer	February 19, 1986	15.3/23
17	17	"To Be a Man"	Cliff Bole	Don Mankiewicz	March 5, 1986	12.6/19
18	18	"Ugly Duckling"	Charlie Correll	Larry Gross	March 12, 1986	15.3/23
19	19	"Slow Death"	Don Weis	Stephen Kandel	April 2, 1986	17.4/27
20	20	"The Escape"	Don Chaffey	Stephen Kandel	April 16, 1986	15.7/25
21	21	"A Prisoner of Conscience"	Cliff Bole	Stephen Kandel	April 30, 1986	13.3/22
22	22	"The Assassin"	Charlie Correll	James Schmerer	May 7, 1986	13.6/24

=== Season 2 (1986–87) ===
No. overall	No. in season	Title	Directed by	Written by	Original release date	Rating/share (households)
23	1	"The Human Factor"	Charlie Correll	Robin Bernheim	September 22, 1986	15.4/24
24	2	"The Eraser"	Paul Krasny	Stephen Kronish	September 29, 1986	14.0/22
25	3	"Twice Stung"	Paul Krasny	Story by : Bill Froehlich & Mark Lisson & Phil Combest; Teleplay by : Mark Lisson & Bill Froehlich	October 6, 1986	13.9/22
26	4	"The Wish Child"	Charlie Correll	Story by : Stephen Kronish & Brian Lane & Stephen Kandel; Teleplay by : Bill Froehlich & Stephen Kandel	October 20, 1986	13.1/20
27	5	"Final Approach"	Alexander Singer	Rob Hedden	October 27, 1986	10.3/15
28	6	"Jack of Lies"	Charlie Correll	Kerry Lenhart & John J. Sakmar	November 3, 1986	14.3/22
29	7	"The Road Not Taken"	Cliff Bole	Story by : Chuck Bowman; Teleplay by : Stephen Kronish	November 10, 1986	14.9/23
30	8	"Eagles"	Paul Krasny	George Lee Marshall	November 17, 1986	14.6/22
31	9	"Silent World"	James L. Conway	Stephen Kandel	November 24, 1986	14.4/22
32	10	"Three for the Road"	Alan Crosland	Story by : Mark Lisson & Rob Hedden; Teleplay by : John J. Sakmar & Kerry Lenhart	December 15, 1986	13.7/21
33	11	"Phoenix Under Siege"	Gilbert M. Shilton	Story by : John I. Koivula; Teleplay by : Stephen Kronish	January 5, 1987	12.9/18
34	12	"Family Matter"	Alexander Singer	Paul Magistretti	January 12, 1987	16.1/23
35	13	"Soft Touch"	Charlie Correll	Joan Brooker & Nancy Eddo	January 19, 1987	16.7/23
36	14	"Birth Day"	James L. Conway	Rob Hedden	February 2, 1987	14.8/22
37	15	"Pirates"	Bruce Kessler	Stephen Kandel	February 9, 1987	16.3/23
38	16	"Out in the Cold"	Cliff Bole	Stephen Kronish	February 16, 1987	17.5/24
39	17	"Dalton, Jack of Spies"	Bob Sweeney	John J. Sakmar & Kerry Lenhart	February 23, 1987	15.8/23
40	18	"Partners"	Cliff Bole	Mark Lisson & Bill Froehlich	March 2, 1987	15.1/22
41	19	"Bushmaster"	Don Chaffey	Rob Hedden	March 23, 1987	15.5/23
42	20	"Friends"	Cliff Bole	Stephen Kronish	April 6, 1987	15.4/24
43	21	"D.O.A.: MacGyver"	Cliff Bole	Jaison Starkes	April 27, 1987	12.6/21
44	22	"For Love or Money"	James L. Conway	Douglas Heyes, Jr.	May 4, 1987	12.3/20

=== Season 3 (1987–88) ===
No. overall	No. in season	Title	Directed by	Written by	Original release date	Rating/share (households)
45	1	"Lost Love (Part 1)"	Cliff Bole	Jerry Ludwig	September 21, 1987	11.9/20
46	2	"Lost Love (Part 2)"	Cliff Bole	Jerry Ludwig	September 28, 1987	12.2/19
47	3	"Back from the Dead"	James L. Conway	Stephen Kronish	October 5, 1987	12.2/20
48	4	"Ghost Ship"	Mike Vejar	Stephen Kandel	October 19, 1987	13.1/21
49	5	"Fire and Ice"	Alan Simmonds	Rick Husky	October 26, 1987	13.7/22
50	6	"GX-1"	Mike Vejar	Calvin Clements, Jr.	November 2, 1987	11.2/17
51	7	"Jack in the Box"	James L. Conway	David Rich	November 9, 1987	14.3/23
52	8	"The Widowmaker"	Mike Vejar	Story by : Harv Zimmel; Teleplay by : John Whelpley	November 16, 1987	13.7/22
53	9	"Hell Week"	James L. Conway	Leonard Mlodinow & Scott Rubenstein	November 23, 1987	13.2/21
54	10	"Blow Out"	Cliff Bole	Reed Moran	December 21, 1987	11.4/19
55	11	"Kill Zone"	Chuck Bowman	Calvin Clements, Jr.	January 4, 1988	15.4/22
56	12	"Early Retirement"	Cliff Bole	John Whelpley	January 18, 1988	13.9/20
57	13	"Thin Ice"	Cliff Bole	Rick Drew	February 1, 1988	12.9/19
58	14	"The Odd Triple"	James L. Conway	Stephen Kandel	February 29, 1988	14.0/21
59	15	"The Negotiator"	Charlie Correll	Calvin Clements, Jr.	March 7, 1988	13.0/20
60	16	"The Spoilers"	Mike Vejar	Stephen Kandel	March 14, 1988	15.4/23
61	17	"Mask of the Wolf"	Cliff Bole	Story by : John J. Sakmar & Kerry Lenhart and Calvin Clements, Jr. & Reed Moran; Teleplay by : Calvin Clements & Jr. & Reed Moran	March 28, 1988	13.5/21
62	18	"Rock the Cradle"	Mike Vejar	John Whelpley	April 18, 1988	13.0/21
63	19	"The Endangered"	Charlie Correll	Peter Filardi	May 2, 1988	13.3/22
64	20	"Murderers' Sky"	Mike Vejar	Herman Miller	May 9, 1988	14.3/23

=== Season 4 (1988–89) ===
No. overall	No. in season	Title	Directed by	Written by	Original release date	U.S. viewers (millions)	Rating/share (households)
65	1	"The Secret of Parker House"	Mike Vejar	Story by : Gene Hanson; Teleplay by : Rick Drew & John Sheppard & Gene Hanson	October 31, 1988	18.1	12.5/20
66	2	"Blood Brothers"	Charlie Correll	Rick Drew	November 21, 1988	18.6	12.2/20
67	3	"The Outsiders"	Mike Vejar	Michelle Poteet Lisanti	November 28, 1988	18.6	13.2/20
68	4	"On a Wing and a Prayer"	Charlie Correll	John Whelpley	December 5, 1988	16.2	11.7/18
69	5	"Collision Course"	Chuck Bowman	Paul B. Margolis	December 12, 1988	16.9	11.7/19
70	6	"The Survivors"	Michael Caffey	Reed Moran	January 9, 1989	20.3	13.5/20
71	7	"Deadly Dreams"	Les Landau	Stephen Downing	January 16, 1989	20.3	13.2/20
72	8	"Ma Dalton"	Rob Bowman	John Whelpley	January 23, 1989	21.9	14.6/22
73	9	"Cleo Rocks"	Chuck Bowman	John Sheppard & Rick Drew	February 6, 1989	20.9	13.2/19
74	10	"Fraternity of Thieves"	Michael Preece	Grant Rosenberg	February 13, 1989	21.0	13.9/21
75	11	"The Battle of Tommy Giordano"	Mike Vejar	Marianne Clarkson	February 20, 1989	22.9	14.6/22
76	12	"The Challenge"	Dana Elcar	Chris Haddock	February 27, 1989	22.4	15.0/22
77	13	"Runners"	Michael Caffey	Joel Schwartz	March 13, 1989	23.0	15.2/23
78	14	"Gold Rush"	William Gereghty	David Engelbach	March 27, 1989	22.3	15.1/24
79	15	"The Invisible Killer"	Dana Elcar	Chris Haddock	April 10, 1989	23.3	15.5/24
80	16	"Brainwashed"	Michael Caffey	John Sheppard	April 24, 1989	18.1	12.7/22
81	17	"Easy Target"	Charlie Correll	Rick Drew	May 1, 1989	20.2	13.5/22
82	18	"Renegade"	Michael Caffey	Story by : Robert Bielak & Chris Haddock; Teleplay by : Chris Haddock	May 8, 1989	20.8	13.9/23
83	19	"Unfinished Business"	Charlie Correll	Marianne Clarkson	May 15, 1989	19.0	13.2/22

=== Season 5 (1989–90) ===
No. overall	No. in season	Title	Directed by	Written by	Original release date	U.S. viewers (millions)
84	1	"Legend of the Holy Rose (Part 1)"	Michael Caffey	Stephen Downing	September 18, 1989	14.4
85	2	"Legend of the Holy Rose (Part 2)"	Charlie Correll	Stephen Downing	September 25, 1989	18.1
86	3	"The Black Corsage"	Charlie Correll	Paul B. Margolis	October 2, 1989	18.3
87	4	"Cease Fire"	William Gereghty	Chris Haddock	October 9, 1989	17.0
88	5	"Second Chance"	Michael Caffey	Robert Sherman	October 16, 1989	19.9
89	6	"Halloween Knights"	Charlie Correll	John Sheppard	October 30, 1989	19.2
90	7	"Children of Light"	Bill Corcoran	Rick Mittleman	November 6, 1989	19.7
91	8	"Black Rhino"	Michael Caffey	Paul B. Margolis	November 13, 1989	19.2
92	9	"The Ten Percent Solution"	Michael Preece	Tom Drake & Sally Drake	November 20, 1989	18.2
93	10	"Two Times Trouble"	Michael Preece	Robert Sherman	December 11, 1989	19.3
94	11	"The Madonna"	Michael Caffey	Cathleen Young	December 18, 1989	17.2
95	12	"Serenity"	William Gereghty	Stephen Kandel	January 8, 1990	22.2
96	13	"Live and Learn"	Harry Harris	Rick Mittleman	January 15, 1990	22.1
97	14	"Log Jam"	William Gereghty	Lee Maddux	February 5, 1990	21.4
98	15	"The Treasure of Manco"	Michael Preece	Chris Haddock	February 12, 1990	19.6
99	16	"Jenny's Chance"	Michael Caffey	Rick Drew & John Sheppard	February 19, 1990	23.0
100	17	"Deep Cover"	Charlie Correll	Robert Sherman & Paul B. Margolis	February 26, 1990	20.1
101	18	"The Lost Amadeus"	Michael Caffey	Paul B. Margolis	March 19, 1990	20.6
102	19	"Hearts of Steel"	Charlie Correll	Rick Mittleman	April 9, 1990	18.8
103	20	"Rush to Judgement"	Charlie Correll	Robert Sherman	April 16, 1990	18.4
104	21	"Passages"	William Gereghty	Story by : Anthony Rich; Teleplay by : John Sheppard	April 30, 1990	18.4

=== Season 6 (1990–91) ===
No. overall	No. in season	Title	Directed by	Written by	Original release date	U.S. viewers (millions)
105	1	"Tough Boys"	Mike Vejar	Art Washington	September 17, 1990	17.7
106	2	"Humanity"	William Gereghty	Lincoln Kibbee	September 24, 1990	16.2
107	3	"The Gun"	William Gereghty	Robert Sherman	October 1, 1990	18.6
108	4	"Twenty Questions"	Michael Caffey	Rick Mittleman	October 8, 1990	20.9
109	5	"The Wall"	Michael Preece	Rick Drew	October 22, 1990	17.2
110	6	"Lesson in Evil"	William Gereghty	John Sheppard	October 29, 1990	18.3
111	7	"Harry's Will"	William Gereghty	Lincoln Kibbee	November 5, 1990	21.7
112	8	"MacGyver's Women"	Michael Preece	Lincoln Kibbee & Stephen Kandel	November 12, 1990	18.8
113	9	"Bitter Harvest"	Mike Vejar	Michael Kane	November 19, 1990	20.0
114	10	"The Visitor"	William Gereghty	Brad Radnitz	December 3, 1990	22.4
115	11	"Squeeze Play"	Michael Preece	Art Washington	December 17, 1990	18.3
116	12	"Jerico Games"	William Gereghty	Robert Sherman	January 7, 1991	20.8
117	13	"The Wasteland"	Michael Caffey	Story by : Grant Rosenberg & Robert Hamner; Teleplay by : Robert Hamner	January 21, 1991	19.7
118	14	"Eye of Osiris"	Mike Vejar	John Sheppard	February 4, 1991	19.7
119	15	"High Control"	Michael Caffey	Lincoln Kibbee	February 11, 1991	19.4
120	16	"There But For the Grace"	William Gereghty	John Considine	February 18, 1991	20.4
121	17	"Blind Faith"	Michael Caffey	John Considine	March 4, 1991	15.4
122	18	"Faith, Hope & Charity"	William Gereghty	Brad Radnitz	March 18, 1991	19.3
123	19	"Strictly Business"	Mike Vejar	John Sheppard	April 8, 1991	17.7
124	20	"Trail of Tears"	Michael Preece	Lincoln Kibbee	April 29, 1991	16.2
125	21	"Hind-Sight"	Michael Preece	Rick Mittleman	May 6, 1991	15.5

=== Season 7 (1991–92) ===
No. overall	No. in season	Title	Directed by	Written by	Original release date	U.S. viewers (millions)
126	1	"Honest Abe"	Michael Caffey	Lincoln Kibbee	September 16, 1991	12.9
127	2	"The 'Hood"	Mike Vejar	Rick Mittleman	September 23, 1991	12.9
128	3	"Obsessed"	William Gereghty	John Sheppard	September 30, 1991	14.1
129	4	"The Prometheus Syndrome"	William Gereghty	Robert Sherman	October 7, 1991	13.4
130	5	"The Coltons"	William Gereghty	Story by : Michael Greenburg & Stephen Downing; Teleplay by : Stephen Downing	October 14, 1991	14.7
131	6	"Walking Dead"	Michael Preece	Mark Rodgers	October 21, 1991	14.7
132	7	"Good Knight MacGyver (Part 1)"	Mike Vejar	John Considine	November 4, 1991	14.6
133	8	"Good Knight MacGyver (Part 2)"	Mike Vejar	John Considine	November 11, 1991	17.0
134	9	"Deadly Silents"	William Gereghty	Brad Radnitz	November 18, 1991	15.1
135	10	"Split Decision"	Michael Caffey	David Rich	December 2, 1991	14.8
136	11	"Gunz 'N Boyz"	William Gereghty	Art Washington	December 16, 1991	15.4
137	12	"Off the Wall"	Michael Preece	Rick Mittleman	December 30, 1991	17.9
138	13	"The Stringer"	Mike Vejar	John Sheppard	April 25, 1992	22.3
139	14	"The Mountain of Youth"	William Gereghty	Brad Radnitz	May 21, 1992	12.3

== TV films (1994) ==
Title	Directed by	Written by	Original release date	U.S. viewers (millions)
Lost Treasure of Atlantis	Mike Vejar	John Sheppard	May 14, 1994	14.5
MacGyver and his former college archeology professor (Brian Blessed) search for the Lost Treasure of Atlantis while at the same time shake off unwanted competition.
Trail to Doomsday	Charlie Correll	John Considine	November 24, 1994	16.4
After the death of his close friend, MacGyver investigates, and discovers a nuclear processing plant in Great Britain and a plan to sell nuclear weapons. Will MacGyver be able to expose and stop the conspiracy before they carry out the deed?
