= Through the Keyhole =

British comedy panel show (1987–2019)

- Also known as: Keith Lemon's Through the Keyhole
- Genre: Comedy; Panel show
- Created by: Kevin Sim
- Presented by: Sir David Frost; Leigh Francis
- Country of origin: United Kingdom
- Original language: English
- No. of series: 8 (ITV); 1 (Sky One); 9 (BBC); 6 (Revival)
- No. of episodes: 115 (ITV); 42 (Sky One); 314 (BBC); 47 (Revival)

Production
- Production locations: The Leeds Studios (1987–2008); Pinewood Studios (2013–2018); BBC Elstree Centre (2018–2019)
- Running time: 30 minutes (1987–2006); 45 minutes (2007–2008); 60 minutes (2013–2019)
- Production companies: Yorkshire Television (1987–1995); Paradine Productions (1996–2008); Talkback (2013–2019)

Original release
- Network: ITV
- Release: 3 April 1987 – 1 May 1995
- Network: Sky One
- Release: 22 February – 23 December 1996
- Network: BBC One
- Release: 5 May 1998 – 2 August 2004
- Network: BBC Two
- Release: 27 February 2006 – 4 June 2008
- Network: ITV
- Release: 31 August 2013 – 23 February 2019

Through the Keyhole is a British comedy panel game show created by the television producer Kevin Sim and originally presented by Sir David Frost in the studio and Loyd Grossman on location. The location presenter explores celebrities' houses and a panel of other celebrities in the studio try to guess who the famous homeowner is.

The show was originally produced by Yorkshire Television and was broadcast on ITV from 3 April 1987 to 1 May 1995, then on Sky One from 22 February to 23 December 1996 before moving to BBC One from 5 May 1998 to 2 August 2004 and its sister channel BBC Two from 27 February 2006 to 4 June 2008.

In 2013, the show was revived for ITV with Leigh Francis as the host. In February 2020, it was reported that the programme had been cancelled after six series.

== History ==
=== Original series ===
Through the Keyhole originally started as a segment on TV-am, first being broadcast on its launch day on 1 February 1983. The idea was created by Kevin Sim as a chance to look around some of the most influential homes with Grossman at the helm as the tour presenter. Grossman was mistakenly given the job after someone had confused him with another journalist. It became a regular feature of TV-am throughout 1983 until May 1985.

In Spring 1986, Frost transferred the concept to Yorkshire Television who picked up the format, to produce a full half-hour programme for ITV, where a celebrity panel tries to guess whose house is being looked at. From 1987, it ran in primetime on Friday nights for eight years on ITV and was rarely out of the top ten entertainment programmes on television. The executive producers were Kevin Sim and Chantal Rickards. From 1996, it was produced by Frost's own production company, Paradine Productions, at Yorkshire Television. That same year, the show also moved to Sky One for one series. It then moved to BBC One Daytime in 1998 until 2004. The final three series aired on BBC Two from 2006 to 2008, after which it was cancelled by the BBC. However, a special aired in March 2011 for Red Nose Day 2011 as part of marathon panel show 24 Hour Panel People.

=== Revival ===
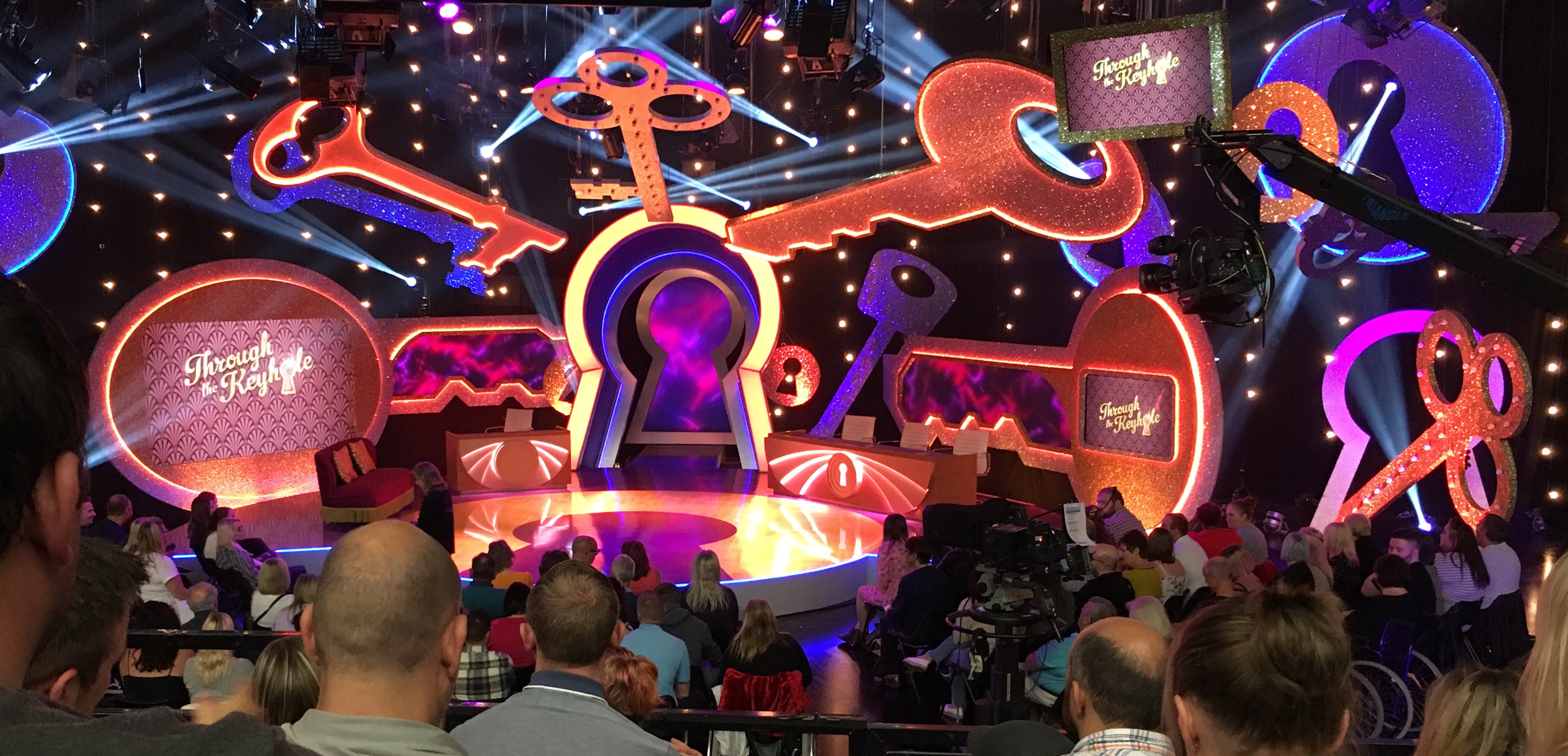
Through the Keyhole set at BBC Elstree Centre in 2018

In 2013, the programme returned on its original broadcast channel ITV with Leigh Francis (in character as Keith Lemon) taking up the dual roles of studio presenter and house detective. The new series was filmed at Pinewood Studios until 2018, with series 6 filmed at the BBC Elstree Centre's Studio D in the latter half of the year. Dave Berry was a regular panellist. The first episode of the revived series aired on the same day that former host Sir David Frost died, although the news did not break until the following morning.

Before his death in August 2013, Frost gave his backing to ITV's remake, saying: "I am delighted that the Keyhole format is now entering its fourth decade on TV. I know the pilot show went down very well with the studio audience and I wish Keith and his team the very best of luck for the series."

== Format ==
At the start of each episode, Frost introduces a panel of three celebrities with the catchphrase "And what a panel they are ..." and some gently humorous or mocking descriptions. He then hands over to the location presenter who gives the panellists a guided tour of a property, noting particular items, though there is typically a large amount of misdirection involved as the items pointed out by the presenter are not necessarily the most pertinent clues to the person's identity. Items not specifically mentioned may provide much more useful clues. Once completed, Frost reveals the identity of the guest to the audience and the panel are given turns at guessing their identity. The audience participate with varying degrees of applause according to the accuracy of the panellists' guesswork.

The panellists are either successful at identifying the guest or Frost reveals their identity, after which they are interviewed and given a key-shaped trophy as a memento. Starting during Loyd Grossman's reign as location presenter, the geographic spread was extended with one of the properties on each episode being located in the US and one in Europe. When Stefanie Powers joined in 2007, she was based in the US and conducted the US property tours, whilst in the UK Lisa Snowdon conducted the European part.

== Celebrity panellists and homeowners ==
=== ITV ===
==== Series 1 ====
#	Celebrity panellists	Celebrity homeowners	Original air date
1	Alan Coren; Mary Parkinson; Kenneth Williams	Spike Milligan; Stirling Moss	3 April 1987
2	Willie Rushton; Eve Pollard; Chris Tarrant	Linda Lusardi; Freddie Starr	10 April 1987
3	Chris Tarrant; Nina Myskow; Lord Lichfield	Tony Blackburn; Robert Maxwell	17 April 1987
4	Alan Coren; Mary Parkinson; Kenneth Williams	Lynsey de Paul; Magnus Pyke	24 April 1987
5	Chris Tarrant; Nina Myskow; Lord Lichfield	Bryan Robson; Beryl Reid	1 May 1987
6	Willie Rushton; Eve Pollard; Chris Tarrant	Molly Parkin; Vince Hill	8 May 1987
7	Alan Coren; Moira Stuart; Willie Rushton	Five Star; Mary Whitehouse	15 May 1987
8	Chris Tarrant; Eve Pollard; Kenneth Williams	Suzanne Dando; Lennie Bennett	22 May 1987
9	Steve Blacknell; Anna Raeburn; Willie Rushton	Rick Wakeman; Sandy Gall	29 May 1987
10	Alan Coren; Moira Stuart; Willie Rushton	Jack Charlton; Stan Boardman	5 June 1987
11	Chris Tarrant; Eve Pollard; Kenneth Williams	Denis Healey; Janet Brown	12 June 1987
12	Chris Tarrant; Nina Myskow; Lord Lichfield	Tessa Sanderson; George Melly	19 June 1987
13	Chris Tarrant; Eve Pollard; Kenneth Williams	Harvey Smith; Duchess of Argyll	26 June 1987

==== Series 2 ====
#	Celebrity panellists	Celebrity homeowners	Original air date
1	Chris Tarrant; Emma Freud; Willie Rushton	David Steel; Ruby Wax	15 April 1988
2	Pattie Coldwell; Lord Lichfield; Eve Pollard	Uri Geller; Bob Carolgees	22 April 1988
3	Willie Rushton; Clare Rayner; Chris Tarrant	Michael Fish; Su Pollard	29 April 1988
4	Chris Tarrant; Anna Raeburn; Nigel Dempster	Jane Rossington; Fred Trueman	6 May 1988
5	Willie Rushton; Sarah Kennedy; Alan Coren	Clive Sinclair; Kenny Everett	13 May 1988
6	Willie Rushton; Eve Pollard; Judith Chalmers	Katie Boyle; Bernard Manning	20 May 1988
7	Willie Rushton; Clare Rayner; Chris Tarrant	Bob Champion; Debbie Greenwood	27 May 1988
8	Pattie Coldwell; Lord Lichfield; Eve Pollard	Gordon Honeycombe; Liz Dawn	3 June 1988
9	Willie Rushton; Sarah Kennedy; Alan Coren	Clare Francis; Bill Oddie	24 June 1988
10	Chris Tarrant; Anna Raeburn; Nigel Dempster	Mike Reid; Mike Read	1 July 1988
11	Chris Tarrant; Emma Freud; Willie Rushton	Kenny Ball; Lucinda Green	8 July 1988
12	Willie Rushton; Eve Pollard; Alan Coren	Lord Montagu of Beaulieu; Fatima Whitbread	15 July 1988
13	Chris Tarrant; Eve Pollard; Alan Coren	Jean Rogers; Clement Freud	5 August 1988

==== Series 3 ====
#	Celebrity panellists	Celebrity homeowners	Original air date
1	Chris Tarrant; Alan Titchmarsh; Eve Pollard	Henry Cooper; Ruth Madoc	17 February 1989
2	Willie Rushton; Chris Tarrant; Eve Pollard	Bruce Kent; Jimmy Savile	24 February 1989
3	Willie Rushton; Patti Coldwell; Ned Sherrin	Bernie Clifton; Delia Smith	3 March 1989
4	Sue Lloyd; Bill Oddie; Chris Tarrant	Lance Percival; Maria Whittaker	10 March 1989
5	Alan Coren; Debbie Rix; Chris Tarrant	Nina Myskow; Eddie "The Eagle" Edwards	17 March 1989
6	Willie Rushton; Chris Tarrant; Eve Pollard	Jim Bowen; Ossie Ardiles	24 March 1989
7	Clement Freud; Anna Raeburn; Willie Rushton	Victor & Marilyn Lownes; Paddy Ashdown & Jane Ashdown	31 March 1989
8	Chris Tarrant; Eve Pollard; Alan Coren	Rachael Heyhoe Flint; Russell Grant	7 April 1989
9	Katie Boyle; Willie Rushton; Carol Vorderman	Mary Peters; Screaming Lord Sutch	14 April 1989
10	Judi Spiers; Chris Tarrant; Sue Lloyd	Sharron Davies; Bernard Matthews	21 April 1989
11	Patti Coldwell; Willie Rushton; Ned Sherrin	Annabel Croft; Kenny Lynch	28 April 1989
12	Willie Rushton; Anna Raeburn; Clement Freud	Norman St John-Stevas; Steve Wright	5 May 1989
13	Judi Spiers; Chris Tarrant; Bill Oddie	Eddy Shah; Kathy Staff	12 May 1989

==== Series 4 ====
#	Celebrity panellists	Celebrity homeowners	Original air date
1	Chris Tarrant; Stephanie Calman; Alan Coren	Judge James Pickles; Doc Cox	9 March 1990
2	Katie Boyle; Willie Rushton; Chris Tarrant	Sheila Ferguson; Lord Oaksey	16 March 1990
3	Willie Rushton; Patti Coldwell; Mike Read	Barbara Castle; Barry McGuigan	23 March 1990
4	Willie Rushton; Chris Tarrant; Katie Boyle	Viscount Weymouth; John Conteh	30 March 1990
5	Chris Tarrant; Nina Myskow; Danny La Rue	Patrick Moore; Gerald Harper	6 April 1990
6	Willie Rushton; Hilary Kingsley; Mike Read	Acker Bilk; Rose-Marie	13 April 1990
7	Willie Rushton; Nina Myskow; Andrew O'Connor	Debbie Moore; Roger De Courcey	20 April 1990
8	Willie Rushton; Nina Myskow; Andrew O'Connor	Phil Drabble; Peter Stringfellow	27 April 1990
9	Chris Tarrant; Stephanie Calman; Alan Coren	Simon & Annette Howard; William Roache	4 May 1990
10	Willie Rushton; Eve Pollard; Lord Lichfield	Zandra Rhodes; Ray Illingworth	11 May 1990
11	Lord Lichfield; Eve Pollard; Danny La Rue	Jeffrey Archer; Glynn Christian	18 May 1990
12	Willie Rushton; Eve Pollard; Mike Read	Gerry & Susan Goldwyres; Phil & Frances Edmonds	25 May 1990
13	Eve Pollard; Chris Tarrant; Alan Titchmarsh	Tony Hart; Don Maclean	1 June 1990

=== Revival ===
==== Series 1 ====
#	Celebrity panellists	Celebrity homeowners	Original air date	Viewers (millions)
1	Dave Berry; Eamonn Holmes; Martine McCutcheon	Louis Smith; John Prescott; Duncan James; Lee Ryan	31 August 2013	5.13
2	Dave Berry; Jonathan Ross; Denise van Outen	Mary Berry; Carol McGiffin; Tom Fletcher	7 September 2013	4.21
3	Dave Berry; Cilla Black; Holly Willoughby	Louis Walsh; Kerry Katona; Greg Rutherford	14 September 2013	4.25
4	Dave Berry; Terry Wogan; Catherine Tyldesley	Bruno Tonioli; Stacey Solomon; Kelly Hoppen	21 September 2013	3.95
5	Dave Berry; Emma Bunton; Larry Lamb	Linda Robson; Mel B Joey Essex	28 September 2013	3.27
6	Dave Berry; Simon Gregson; Mollie King	Amir Khan; Daryl Hannah; Sarah Harding	5 October 2013	3.64
7	Dave Berry; Julian Clary; Barbara Windsor	Gino D'Acampo; Neil Morrissey; Denise Welch	15 December 2013	3.58

- Note: Episode 7 was a Christmas special.

==== Series 2 ====
#	Celebrity panellists	Celebrity homeowners	Original air date	Viewers (millions)
1	Alan Carr; Ruth Langsford; Jonathan Ross	Sinitta; Shaun Ryder; Laurence Llewelyn-Bowen	30 August 2014	3.35
2	Joe Swash; Gabby Logan; Paddy McGuinness	Harry Judd; George Takei; John Thomson	6 September 2014	3.31
3	Jimmy Carr; Natalie Anderson; Dave Berry	Will Mellor; Chris Packham; Claire Richards	13 September 2014	3.61
4	Kian Egan; Christine Bleakley; Warwick Davis	Gene Simmons; Sam Bailey; Duncan Bannatyne	20 September 2014	3.59
5	Craig Charles; Fearne Cotton; Dave Berry	David Dickinson; JB Gill; Claire Sweeney	27 September 2014	3.24
6	Vernon Kay; Carol Vorderman; Katherine Ryan	Rylan Clark; Hilary Devey; Nicky Clarke	4 October 2014	3.39
7	Des O'Connor; Myleene Klass; Dave Berry	Dave Myers; Verne Troyer; Toyah Willcox	11 October 2014	2.85
8	Jonathan Ross; Kym Marsh; Louis Walsh	Jane Seymour; Louie Spence; Alex James	26 December 2014	2.65

- Note: Episode 8 was a Christmas special

==== Series 3 ====
#	Celebrity panellists	Celebrity homeowners	Original air date	Viewers (millions)
1	Gino D'Acampo; Sue Cleaver; Johnny Vegas	Germaine Greer; James Argent; Lou Ferrigno	29 August 2015	2.85
2	Jonathan Ross; Kimberley Walsh; Andi Peters	Penn Jillette; Carl Fogarty; James and Ola Jordan	5 September 2015	2.69
3	Paddy McGuinness; Tess Daly; Jerry Springer	Craig Revel Horwood; Bill Oddie; Yvette Fielding	12 September 2015	3.09
4	Bruno Tonioli; Davina McCall; Dave Berry	David Haye; Vanessa Feltz; Charlotte Crosby	19 September 2015	2.71
5	Antony Cotton; Sara Cox; Jimmy Carr	Sharon Osbourne; Dom Joly; Kimberly Wyatt	26 September 2015	2.01
6	Mark Wright; Janet Street-Porter; Vernon Kay	Peter Andre; Kate Silverton; Simon Webbe	3 October 2015	Under 2.01
7	Michael Buerk; Ashley Roberts; Dave Berry	Anthea Turner; Ken Hom; Georgia May Foote	10 October 2015	Under 2.13
8	Jimmy Carr; Stephen Mulhern; Claudia Winkleman	Russell Grant; Jack Osbourne; Jo Wood	24 December 2015	Under 1.91

- Note: Episode 8 was a Christmas special.

==== Series 4 ====
A fourth series began airing on 7 January 2017, with a Christmas episode airing two weeks previously, on 24 December. Eight episodes were recorded at Pinewood Studios in July 2016.

#	Celebrity panellists	Celebrity homeowners	Original air date	Viewers (millions)
1	Shayne Ward; Kelly Brook; Johnny Vegas	Kimberley Walsh; Wayne Sleep; Tony Mortimer	24 December 2016	Under 3.51
2	Will Mellor; Fearne Cotton; Judge Rinder	Pamela Anderson; Sid Owen; Lady Colin Campbell	7 January 2017	Under 3.42
3	Eamonn Holmes; Emma Bunton; Jonathan Ross	Gok Wan; Adam West; Andrea McLean	14 January 2017	3.87
4	Marvin Humes; Kate Garraway; Jimmy Carr	Jo Whiley; Jamie Laing; Abz Love	21 January 2017	3.58
5	Paddy McGuinness; Caroline Flack; Dave Berry	Tony Hadley; Dominic Littlewood; Macy Gray	28 January 2017	3.74
6	John Thomson; Kym Marsh; Stephen Mulhern	Harry Redknapp; Gemma Collins; Antony Worrall Thompson	4 February 2017	3.65
7	Fay Ripley; Steve Jones; Rochelle Humes	John Barrowman; Paul Burrell; Cheryl Baker	11 February 2017	3.74
8	David Haye; Samia Ghadie; Dave Berry	Dennis Rodman; Ian "H" Watkins; Melinda Messenger	18 February 2017	3.39

- Note: Episode 1 was a Christmas special.

==== Series 5 ====
A fifth series began airing on 13 January 2018. Prior to this, an I'm a Celebrity...Get Me Out of Here! special aired in December 2017 instead of a Christmas episode.

#	Celebrity panellists	Celebrity homeowners	Original air date	Viewers (millions)
1	Jimmy Carr; Myleene Klass; Tony Blackburn; Stacey Solomon	Vicky Pattison; Derek Acorah; Spencer Pratt and Heidi Montag	9 December 2017	Under 3.46
2	Ben Shephard; Frankie Bridge; Jonathan Ross	Denise Richards; Peter Stringfellow; Su Pollard	13 January 2018	3.63
3	Gregg Wallace; Scarlett Moffatt; Paddy McGuinness	Professor Green; Caprice Bourret; Jesse Metcalfe	20 January 2018	
4	Stephen Mulhern; Rochelle Humes; Louis Walsh	Gloria Hunniford; Bobby Davro; Janice Dickinson	27 January 2018	
5	Shane Richie; Rachel Riley; Alex James	Russell Watson; Katie Price; Jenny Powell	3 February 2018	
6	Jimmy Carr; Scarlett Moffatt; Eamonn Holmes	Vinnie Jones; Ore Oduba; Carol Decker	10 February 2018	
7	Paddy McGuinness; Catherine Tyldesley; Chris Kamara	Ricki Lake; Jamie Theakston; Danielle Armstrong	17 February 2018	
8	Jonathan Ross; Melanie Sykes; Ashley Banjo	John Barnes; Martin Roberts; Ross King	24 February 2018	

- Note: Episode 1 was an I'm a Celebrity special.

==== Series 6 ====
A sixth series began airing on 12 January 2019. Prior to this, a Christmas special aired on 14 December 2018.

#	Celebrity panellists	Celebrity homeowners	Original air date	Viewers (millions)
1	Jimmy Carr; Lorraine Kelly; Jonathan Ross	Julian Clary; Sally Lindsay; Kate Thornton	14 December 2018	
2	Danny Dyer; Sally Phillips; Chris Kamara	Michael Owen; Lesley Garrett; Emily Atack	12 January 2019	
3	Paddy McGuinness; Dani Dyer; Martin Kemp	Shirley Ballas; Linda Barker; Ollie Locke	19 January 2019	
4	Rob Beckett; Alfie Boe; Lucy Fallon	Carmen Electra; Charlie Brooks; Peter Duncan	26 January 2019	
5	Johnny Vegas; Caitlyn Jenner; Craig Revel Horwood	Dean Cain; Mariella Frostrup; Toby Anstis	2 February 2019	
6	Stacey Solomon; Beverley Callard; Joel Dommett	Melissa Joan Hart; Richard Blackwood; Aldo Zilli	9 February 2019	
7	Jimmy Carr; Carol Vorderman; Kriss Akabusi	Steve Guttenberg; Joey Essex; Rebecca Adlington	16 February 2019	
8	Rob Beckett; Janet Street-Porter; Krishnan Guru-Murthy	Shane Lynch; Fatima Whitbread; Scott Mills	23 February 2019	

- Note: Episode 1 was a Christmas special.

== Transmissions ==
=== ITV ===
==== Series ====
Series	Start date	End date	Episodes
1	3 April 1987	26 June 1987	13
2	15 April 1988	5 August 1988	13
3	17 February 1989	12 May 1989	13
4	9 March 1990	1 June 1990	13
5	5 April 1991	12 July 1991	15
6	8 May 1992	31 July 1992	13
7	14 May 1993	3 September 1993	17
8	10 April 1994	19 June 1994	11

==== ITV Specials ====
Date	Title
14 August 1988	The Best of Through the Keyhole
21 August 1988	The Best of Through the Keyhole
28 August 1988	The Best of Through the Keyhole
19 May 1989	The Best of Through the Keyhole
11 January 1990	The Best of Through the Keyhole
26 June 1994	Classic Quiz
1 May 1995	Classic Quiz

=== Sky One ===
Series	Start date	End date	Episodes
1	22 February 1996	23 December 1996	42

=== BBC ===
Series	Start date	End date	Episodes
1	5 May 1998	5 October 1998	42
2	29 March 1999	10 December 1999	54
3	3 April 2000	7 December 2000	52
4	14 May 2001	1 February 2002	39
5	3 July 2002	14 March 2003	32
6	1 March 2004	2 August 2004	30
7	27 February 2006	31 March 2006	25
8	26 March 2007	9 May 2007	20
9	6 May 2008	4 June 2008	20

=== ITV revival ===
Series	Start date	End date	Episodes
1	31 August 2013	5 October 2013	6
2	30 August 2014	11 October 2014	7
3	29 August 2015	10 October 2015	7
4	7 January 2017	18 February 2017	7
5	13 January 2018	24 February 2018	7
6	12 January 2019	23 February 2019	7

==== ITV Specials ====
Date	Title
15 December 2013	Christmas Special
26 December 2014	Christmas Special
24 December 2015	Christmas Special
24 December 2016	Christmas Special
9 December 2017	I'm a Celebrity Special
14 December 2018	Christmas Special

== International broadcast ==
In 2016, the Dutch SBS6 channel broadcast the Dutch version, called Met de deur in huis, hosted by Kees Tol. In this show, comedian Tineke Schouten visits the houses of Dutch celebrities. The panel (Maik de Boer, Patty Brard and Ruben van der Meer) have to guess whose house she is in. In the same year, a second series aired on SBS6.
