= Christopher Fowler =

English writer (1953–2023)

- Born: Christopher Robert Fowler; 26 March 1953; London, England
- Died: 2 March 2023 (aged 69); London, England
- Occupation: Novelist
- Writing career
- Pen name: L. K. Fox
- Period: 1984–2022
- Genres: Thriller, crime fiction
- Notable works: Bryant & May Mysteries
- Website: www.christopherfowler.co.uk

Christopher Robert Fowler (26 March 1953 – 2 March 2023) was an English writer. While working in the British film industry he authored fifty novels and short story collections, including the Bryant & May mysteries, which record the adventures of two Golden Age detectives in modern-day London. He also wrote a psychological thriller, Little Boy Found, under the pseudonym L.K. Fox. His other works include screenplays, video games, graphic novels, audio and stage plays.

Fowler's awards include the 2015 CWA Dagger in the Library (for his entire body of work), The Last Laugh Award (twice) and the British Fantasy Award (multiple times), the Edge Hill Prize and the inaugural Green Carnation Award. He was inducted into the Detection Club in 2021.

== Early life ==
Fowler was born in Greenwich, London, the son of a legal secretary and a glassblower and manufacturer of scientific instruments. He was educated at Colfe’s grammar school in Lee before enrolling to study art at Goldsmiths College in 1972.

== Career ==
Before becoming a novelist, Fowler was a copywriter and film marketer. At the age of 26, he founded the film promotion company, The Creative Partnership, with producer Jim Sturgeon, producing trailers, posters and commercials for radio and TV. He wrote the tag-line for the 1979 sci-fi/horror movie Alien, "In space, no one can hear you scream".

=== Bryant & May mysteries ===
Fowler was best known as the author of the Bryant & May mysteries, in which the two detectives, Arthur Bryant and John May, are members of the fictional Peculiar Crimes Unit, based on a unit his father worked in during World War II.

The Bryant & May series is set primarily in London, with stories taking place in various years between World War II and the present. While there is a progressive narrative, the cases each stand alone as separate stories. The exceptions are Full Dark House, an origin story which focuses on May's reminiscence of the team's first case together during the Blitz; Seventy-Seven Clocks, framed as Bryant's retelling of a case from 1973; and On the Loose and Off the Rails, which continue characters and events across two books. Hall of Mirrors is set in 1969; at one point, the characters discuss the events of that summer: the Woodstock music festival, the Moon landing, and the Manson murders. There are two volumes of "missing cases" (short stories), London's Glory and England's Finest.

Fowler weaves many factual layers of London's history and society throughout the series. Most of the locations are recognisable London landmarks such as St Paul's Cathedral, the Tate Gallery and various theatres. A major feature of The Water Room is the network of tunnels and underground rivers underneath the city. In Off the Rails they explore the London Underground network.

There are many references to other literary works throughout the series. Seventy-Seven Clocks contains references to Gilbert and Sullivan throughout the narrative, while The Victoria Vanishes has deliberate similarities with The Moving Toyshop by Edmund Crispin. Although the books appear to have bizarre, uncanny elements, they are not in any way supernatural or fantastical. The unit in which they are set is based on real post-war London units.

The series is also available in audiobook format, narrated by Tim Goodman. Characters from this series also appear in Fowler's Roofworld, Rune, Darkest Day, and Soho Black, although these books are not considered part of the series.

=== Other novels and short stories ===
Fowler's book Rune is an update to a modern setting of the M. R. James story "Casting the Runes". It also features Bryant, May and several characters from that series.

His story "The Master Builder" was filmed as Through the Eyes of a Killer, starring Richard Dean Anderson, Marg Helgenberger and Tippi Hedren. His tenth short story collection, Old Devil Moon, won the Edge Hill Audience Prize 2008. His short story "Left Hand Drive" was made into a film that won Best British Short. His stories "On Edge" and "The Most Boring Woman in the World" were both filmed. His novella Breathe won the British Fantasy Society Award for best novella in 2005.

Put into different temporal settings, some elements of his original 2008 story "Arkangel" from Exotic Gothic 2 reappear in his 2012 frame-novel Hell Train (a book called "must read now!” by SciFiNow), including the Polish town of Chelmsk, the physical descriptions of its white gold-rivetted damnation train Arkangel and the town's yokels.

His memoir of a lonely 1960s childhood, Paperboy, won the inaugural Green Carnation prize, which celebrates fiction and memoirs written by gay men. A sequel, Film Freak, charted his travels through the British film industry. His collection Red Gloves consisted of 25 new stories marking a quarter-century in print, two graphic novels and a Hammer horror radio play. He also wrote a Sherlock Holmes audio drama for BBC 7 entitled The Lady Downstairs and the War of the Worlds videogame with Sir Patrick Stewart, for Paramount. He was at work on a new thriller, Summer Dies, and a complete collection of his short stories from 1985 to when he died. The third and final installment of his memoir on writing, Word Monkey, was published posthumously.

Further works include:

- Nyctophobia (2014) Solaris Books ISBN 978-1781082102, a haunted house novel set in bright daylight about a woman who is terrified of the dark
- The Casebook of Bryant & May, a graphic novel illustrated by Keith Page
- Menz Insana, a graphic novel illustrated by John Bolton

=== Forgotten Authors series ===
Fowler wrote a periodic column for The Independent titled Invisible Ink. In this series, he looked at a wide range of writers whose works, once popular, have now fallen out of the public eye. His book version, The Book of Forgotten Authors, is published by Quercus.

== Personal life and death ==
Fowler lived in Barcelona and King's Cross, London. His husband, Peter Chapman, was a TV executive.

Fowler was diagnosed with cancer in March 2020, which he announced on his blog the following April. He died in London on 2 March 2023, at the age of 69.

Joanne Harris wrote about him for The Bookseller, speaking of his support for upcoming writers and his "peerless talent": "He has been the most enduring influence of my career, both as a writer and as a friend."

== Novels and collections ==
Title	B&M?	Year	ISBN
How to Impersonate Famous People		1984	ISBN 0-7043-3463-1
The Ultimate Party Book		1985	ISBN 0-04-793087-X
City Jitters		1986	ISBN 0-7221-3704-4
More City Jitters		1988	ISBN 0-4402-0146-2
Roofworld		1988	ISBN 0-7126-2421-X
The Bureau of Lost Souls (US: More City Jitters)		1989	ISBN 0-7126-2459-7
Rune		1990	ISBN 0-7126-3466-5
Red Bride		1992	ISBN 0-356-20805-2
Sharper Knives		1992	ISBN 0-7515-0152-2
Darkest Day		1993	ISBN 0-316-90534-8
Spanky		1994	ISBN 0-7515-0959-0
Flesh Wounds		1995	ISBN 0-7515-1431-4
Psychoville		1995	ISBN 0-7515-1664-3
Menz Insana (graphic novel)		1997	ISBN 1-56389-300-2
Disturbia		1997	ISBN 0-7515-1910-3
Soho Black		1998	ISBN 0-7515-2559-6
Personal Demons		1998	ISBN 1-85242-597-0
Uncut		1999	ISBN 0-7515-2644-4
Calabash		2000	ISBN 0-7515-3040-9
The Devil in Me		2004	ISBN 1-85242-768-X
Demonized (short stories)		2004	ISBN 1-85242-848-1
Full Dark House	B&M 1	2004	ISBN 0-553-81552-0
Breathe		2004	ISBN 1-903889-67-7
The Water Room	B&M 2	2004	ISBN 0-385-60554-4
Seventy-Seven Clocks	B&M 3	2005	ISBN 0-385-60885-3
Ten Second Staircase	B&M 4	2006	ISBN 0-385-60886-1
Old Devil Moon		2007	ISBN 978-1-85242-925-6
White Corridor	B&M 5	2007	ISBN 978-0-385-61067-4
The Victoria Vanishes	B&M 6	2008	ISBN 978-0-385-61068-1
Paperboy (autobiography)		2009	ISBN 978-0-385-61557-0
Bryant & May on the Loose	B&M 7	2009	ISBN 978-0-385-61465-8
Bryant & May Off the Rails	B&M 8	2010	ISBN 978-0-553-80720-2
Bryant & May and the Memory of Blood	B&M 9	2011	ISBN 978-0-85752-049-4
Hell Train		2012	ISBN 978-1-907992-44-5
Bryant & May: The Invisible Code	B&M 10	2012	ISBN 978-0857520500
Film Freak (autobiography)		2013	ISBN 978-0857521606
The Casebook of Bryant & May (graphic novel)	B&M	2013	ISBN 978-1848634565
Plastic		2013	ISBN 978-1781081242
Bryant & May: The Bleeding Heart	B&M 11	2014	ISBN 978-0345547651
Bryant & May and the Secret Santa (single short story)	B&M 11.5	2015	ISBN 978-1101968970
Bryant & May and the Burning Man	B&M 12	2015	ISBN 978-0345547682
The Sand Men		2015	ISBN 978-1781083741
Bryant & May: London's Glory (short stories)	B&M 13	2016	ISBN 978-0857523457
Bryant & May: Strange Tide	B&M 14	2016	ISBN 978-1101887035
Little Boy Found (as LK Fox)		2017	ASIN B06XJ5G9CH
Bryant & May: Wild Chamber	B&M 15	2017	ISBN 978-0857523433
Bryant & May: Hall of Mirrors	B&M 16	2018	ISBN 978-0857523440
Bryant & May: The Lonely Hour	B&M 17	2019	ISBN 978-08575-2568-0
Bryant & May: England's Finest (short stories)	B&M 18	2019	ISBN 978-08575-2569-7
Bryant & May: Oranges and Lemons	B&M 19	2020	ISBN 978-08575-2570-3
Bryant & May: London Bridge Is Falling Down	B&M 20	2021	ISBN 978-0-593-35621-0
Hot water		2022	ISBN 978-1-78909-984-3
Bryant & May’s Peculiar London	B&M	2022	ISBN 978-0-85752-784-4
Word Monkey		2023	ISBN 978-0-8575-2962-6
The Foot on the Crown		2025	ISBN 978-1-7876-3744-3

== See also ==
- List of horror fiction writers
