= Little Boy Found (novel) =

Psychological thriller written by Christopher Fowler under the pen name L. K. Fox

First edition

Little Boy Found is a psychological thriller written by L.K. Fox, a pen name for the author Christopher Fowler, known for writing the series Bryant and May. Little Boy Found was first published on 6 July 2017 as an eBook and then was later released as a paperback. The novel was published by Quercus Books.

== Author ==
Christopher Fowler wrote the book series Bryant and May; horror novels from the ‘80s and ‘90s. Born in 1953, Fowler grew up in Greenwich, London. He has written more than forty novels and short-story collections and also writes a weekly column in The Independent called Invisible Ink. Christopher created the pen name L. K. Fox specifically for Little Boy Found because it is not his usual style of writing. The name is non-gender specific and also uses his mother's initials. Some other books and short stories written by Christopher Fowler are that Rune, The Master Builder, and Red Bride.

== Plot ==
The story is a first-person narrative told from the point of view of Nick and Ella. It follows the events that led them to one another. The main plot; Nick discovers that his son has gone missing when looking at a photograph that he had taken after having a collision with another car. When he goes back to look at this photo for insurance purposes he sees to his horror that his son is in the back of the car, being driven away by a stranger.

Ben contacts his estranged husband, supposedly the biological father of Gabriel, however, it is learned that he is not the father, and adopted him when he was in his previous marriage; his then wife Kate was not able to have children, so they adopted Gabriel. When Kate died Ben met Nick and they married. Ben never reveals that Gabriel is adopted and lets Nick believe that Gabriel is his son. With Gabriel still missing Nick does not understand why Ben is not as worried as he is. He's also increasingly angry with the police and their lack of effort in finding Gabriel. Nick decides to take on the role of finding his son himself, which puts him in great danger.

Meanwhile, young Ella watches and waits, following a child through its adoption process, then worming her way into the household to become the baby's nanny. How these events are connected comes as a shock to all concerned. 'Little Boy Found' began life under the title 'There's Something I Haven't Told You', and subverts traditional elements of the psychological suspense novel.

== Main characters ==
- Nick- The stepfather of Gabriel and is struggling to come to the fact that Gabriel has gone missing and often turns to drink to drown his sorrows. He has to take medication to prevent him from imagining things, however often refuses to do so.
- Ella- A teenage girl who becomes obsessed with a musician named Ryder. Ella is very rebellious and does not get along with either her father or her stepmother. She disobeys their orders and goes to watch Ryder and his band perform. Ella gets to meet her hero, however, he doesn't turn out how she expected and he rapes her. Later Ella comes to find that she is pregnant. She is sent to psychiatric care and gets to her child taken away from her.
- Ben- The father of missing boy Gabriel and married to Nick, he was previously married to a woman called Kate, Ben and Kate adopted their son Gabriel.
- Gabriel- A young boy who has a type of autism, pervasive development disorder. He goes missing one day when he was supposed to be at school, Gabriel was taken from his mother when he was born and was given up for adoption. He was then adopted by Kate and Ben Summerton.

== Supporting characters ==
- Harry- The father of Ella, a hedge-fund manager. He is very old fashioned, rich and owned the biggest house in The Avenue. He was married to Jean and then married Karen after Jean died. Harry is very strict towards Ella and does not try to help or understand her. Jean was usually the supportive parent.
- Jean- The mother of Ella, who dies when Ella is a young girl. Jean was very supportive of Ella and helped her through hard times in her life.
- Karen- The stepmother of Ella who is very lazy and often sits around the house all day complaining. She is 12 years younger than Harry and often felt jealous of his previous marriage with Jean.
- Kate- The ex-wife of Ben, she and Ben adopted Gabriel when they were together due to her inability to get pregnant. When Kate first adopted Gabriel, she was a very caring and loving mother, however, the novelty of having a child wore away and Kate became very hostile and not as loving. Kate then dies as she has a car accident.
- Buck- A friend of Ella's who helped her find her son and looked after her for a long period of time. Buck has a dark past that is unknown throughout the majority of the book, it is then learned that Buck was a figment of Ella's imagination.
