= List of awards and nominations received by Richard Dean Anderson =

Richard Dean Anderson awards and nominations
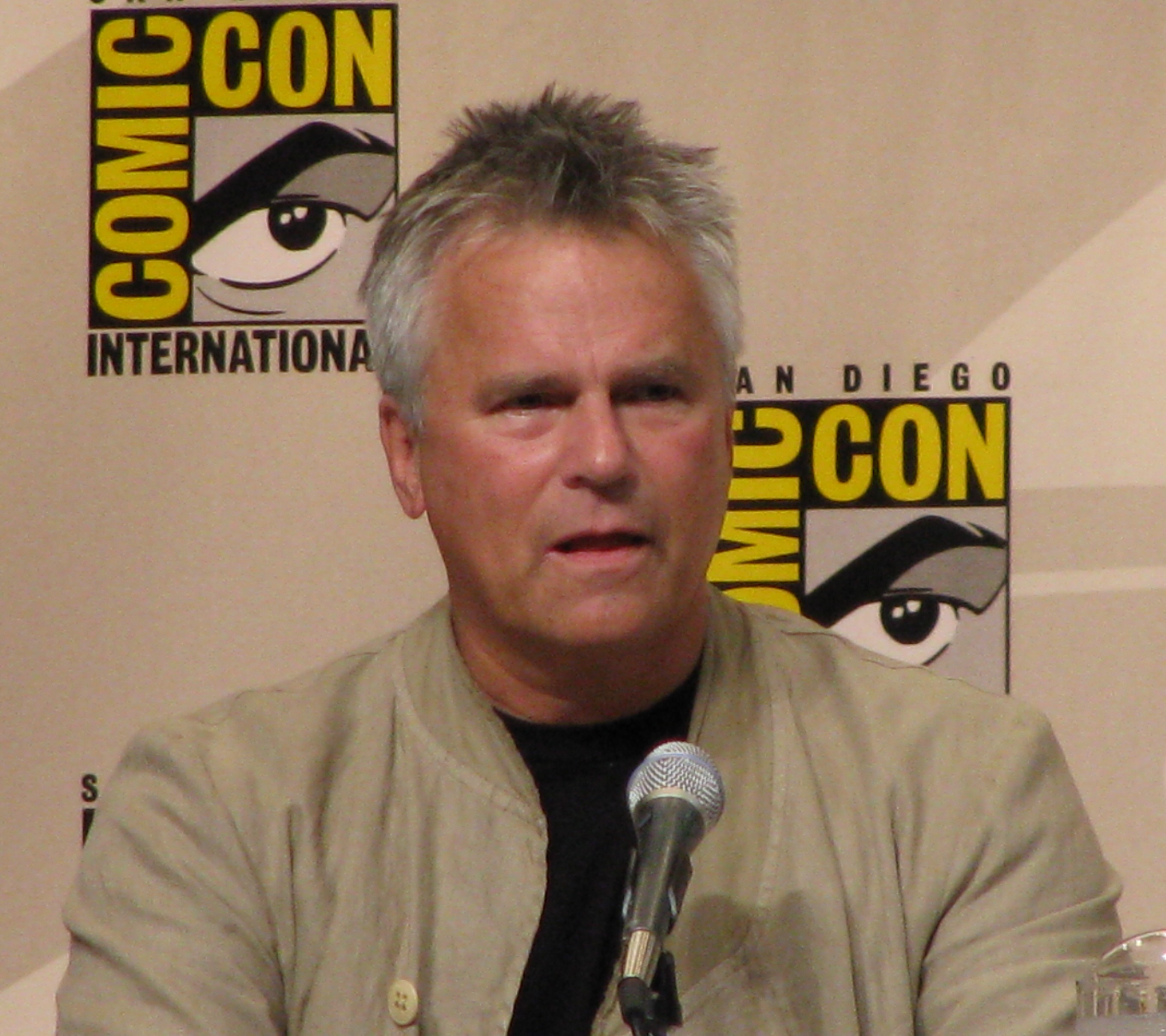
- Anderson in 2008
Awards and nominations
Award	Wins	Nominations
Saturn Awards	2	10
Constellation Awards	0	1
Gemini Awards	0	1
TV Land Awards	0	2

Totals (Note: Certain award groups do not simply award one winner. They acknowledge several different recipients, have runners-up, and have third place. Since this is a specific recognition and is different from losing an award, runner-up mentions are considered wins in this award tally. For simplification and to avoid errors, each award in this list has been presumed to have had a prior nomination.)
- Wins: 2
- Nominations: 14

Richard Dean Anderson is an American film and TV actor who has received numerous awards and honours in the course of a career that has spanned over thirty years. He won, or was nominated for, awards for his work in several series. Starring as Angus MacGyver in the action adventure series MacGyver (1985–92), he received nominations at the TV Land Awards. His next series role was Jack O'Neill (1997-2005) in the military science fiction show Stargate SG-1.

Since 1985, Anderson has been nominated for various awards—nine Saturn Awards (winning two), one Gemini Award, and two TV Land Awards.

== Awards and nominations ==
=== Jules Verne Award ===
Year	Category	For	Result
2012	Jules Verne Award for Excellence in exploration, environmental and cinematic achievements	Sea Shepherd Conservation Society	Received

=== Celebrity Award ===
Year	Category	For	Result
1995	Commitment to the foundation	Make-a-Wish Foundation	Received

=== Constellation Awards ===
Year	Category	For	Result
2009	Best Male Performance in a 2008 Science Fiction Film, TV Movie, or Mini-Series	Stargate: Continuum	Nominated

=== Gemini Awards ===
Year	Category	For	Result
2000	Best Dramatic Series	Stargate SG-1	Nominated

=== Saturn Awards ===
Year	Category	For	Result
1998	Best Actor on Television	Stargate SG-1	Won
1999	Best Genre TV Actor	Stargate SG-1	Nominated
1999	Best Genre TV Actor	Stargate SG-1	Won
2000	Best Genre TV Actor	Stargate SG-1	Nominated
2001	Best Actor on Television	Stargate SG-1	Nominated
2002	Best Actor on Television	Stargate SG-1	Nominated
2003	Best Actor on Television	Stargate SG-1	Nominated
2004	Best Actor on Television	Stargate SG-1	Nominated
2005	Best Actor on Television	Stargate SG-1	Nominated

=== TV Land Awards ===
Year	Category	For	Result
2005	Greatest Gear or Admirable Apparatus	MacGyver	Nominated
2007	Most Uninsurable Driver	MacGyver	Nominated

=== Military awards ===
Anderson was presented with general's stars and granted the title of 'honorary brigadier general' by the United States Air Force, for his positive portrayal of the Air Force, shortly after his fictional character Colonel Jack O'Neil was promoted to general on the show. The show is credited with helping to increase recruitment to the United States Air Force.

The United States Navy also allowed filming aboard a real Los Angeles class submarine for use in creating the first episode of Stargate: Atlantis, in which the character Jack O'Neill appears.

== See also ==
- List of awards and nominations received by Stargate SG-1
