= Through the Eyes of a Killer =

1992 American made-for-television film

- VHS cover
- Genre: Thriller
- Based on: "The Master Builder" by Christopher Fowler
- Written by: Solomon Isaacs
- Directed by: Peter Markle
- Starring: Richard Dean Anderson
- Music by: George S. Clinton
- Country of origin: United States
- Original language: English

Production
- Executive producer: Jennifer Alward
- Producer: Tom Rowe
- Production location: Vancouver
- Cinematography: Frank Tidy
- Editor: David Campling
- Running time: 94 minutes
- Production companies: Morgan Hill Productions; Pacific Motion Pictures; Wilshire Court Productions

Original release
- Network: CBS
- Release: December 15, 1992

Through the Eyes of a Killer is a 1992 American made-for-television thriller film starring Richard Dean Anderson and Marg Helgenberger. The film premiered on CBS on December 15, 1992. It was based on the Christopher Fowler short story "The Master Builder".

== Plot ==
Laurie has a brief affair with Ray, the contractor who is renovating her apartment; later, he refuses to accept the end of their relationship.

== Cast ==
- Marg Helgenberger as Laurie Fisher
- Richard Dean Anderson as Ray Bellano
- David Marshall Grant as Max Campbell
- Melinda Culea as Alison Rivers
- Tippi Hedren as Mrs. Bellano
- Joe Pantoliano as Jerry
- Monica Parker as Dorothy

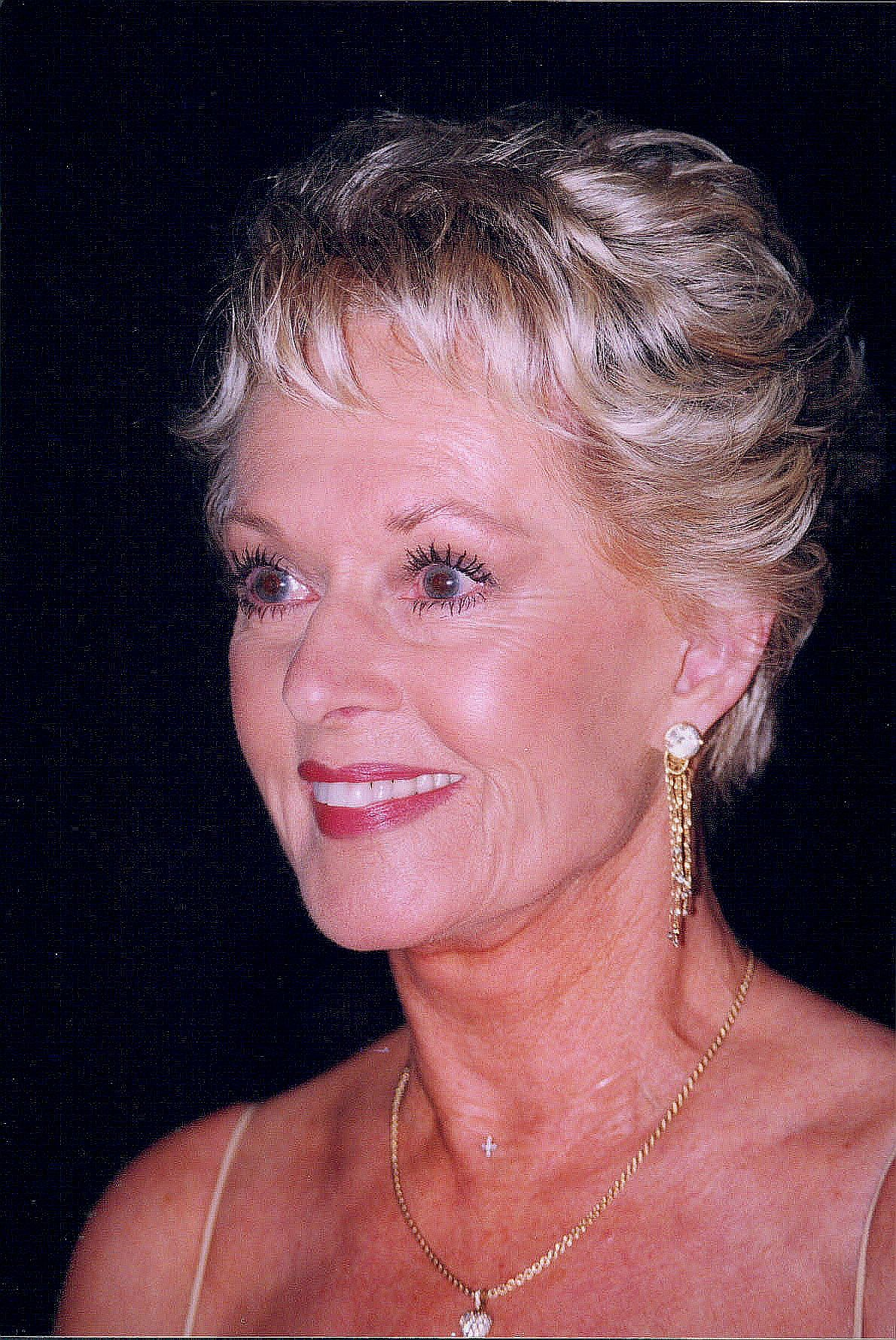
Tippi Hedren (1998 photography)

== Production ==
Fowler commented on the presence of Hedren in the cast as follows: "even though there was originally no part for an older lady. She was terrific in it, and I earned my first screen credit."

== Reception ==
The MovieScene stated that Through the Eyes of a Killer "is not a bad movie, it certainly delivers plenty of 90s TV movie thrills and drama, including some of the semi-erotic kind.^{"} while another review found "The actors do not deliver high performances, which makes the screenplay that John Pielmeier based on the story The Master Builder by Christopher Fowler even less convincing."
