= Beatie Edney =

British actress

- Born: Beatrice Edney; 23 October 1962 (age 63); London, England, UK
- Occupation: Actress
- Years active: 1972–present
- Mother: Sylvia Syms
- Relatives: Nick Webb (cousin); Alex Webb (cousin)

Beatrice Edney (born 23 October 1962) is an English actress. She is best known for playing Heather MacLeod in Highlander (1986), and Prudie Paynter in Poldark (2015–2019).

== Early life ==
Born in London, she is the daughter of actress Sylvia Syms and her husband Alan Edney. Her brother is Benjamin Edney and her cousin was musician Nick Webb.

== Career ==
Edney first came to audiences' attention as Heather MacLeod in the 1986 film Highlander, the first entry in the Highlander series. She returned to the role again in the 2000 film Highlander: Endgame.

In 1989, Edney starred as Maud in the television production of Uncle Silas with Peter O'Toole, shown as The Dark Angel in America. In 1990, she appeared in the Bruce Beresford film Mister Johnson, alongside Pierce Brosnan and Edward Woodward.

Her many television appearances include a leading role in the 1986 series Lost Empires, based on the novel by J. B. Priestley, in which she acted alongside Colin Firth. She has also appeared in episodes of a host of successful British television dramas such as Rosemary & Thyme, A Touch of Frost, Prime Suspect, Inspector Morse (and its spin-off, Lewis), Agatha Christie's Poirot (in the episodes "The Mysterious Affair at Styles" and "The Clocks") and Wallander. In 1994, Edney played the role of Louisa Gradgrind in the television adaptation of Charles Dickens' Hard Times. In 1995, she had a starring role in the Channel 4 sitcom Dressing for Breakfast.

In 2012, she played Queen Charlotte in The Madness of George III at the Apollo Theatre, London. Other stage appearances have included The Girlfriend Experience at the Royal Court. From 2015 to 2019, she played Prudie in the BBC One period drama Poldark.

== Filmography ==
=== Film and television ===
- A Day at the Beach (1970) - Winnie
- Lost Empires (1986, TV series) - Nancy Ellis
- Highlander (1986) - Heather MacLeod
- Diary of a Mad Old Man (1987) - Simone (Marcel's daughter-in-law)
- A Handful of Dust (1988) - Marjorie
- Inspector Morse (1989, TV series, Episode: "The Last Enemy") - Deborah Burns
- The Dark Angel (1989, TV mini-series) - Maud Ruthyn
- Trouble in Paradise (1989) - Ann Kusters
- Frederick Forsyth Presents: Just Another Secret (1989, TV film) - Anneliese
- The Lilac Bus (1990, TV film) - Dee
- Mister Johnson (1990) - Celia Rudbeck
- Agatha Christie's Poirot (1990, TV series, Episode: "The Mysterious Affair at Styles" - Mary Cavendish
- In the Name of the Father (1993) - Carole Richardson
- Hard Times (1994, TV mini-series) - Louisa Gradgrind
- Mesmer (1994) - Marie Antoinette
- MacGyver: Trail to Doomsday (1994, TV film) - Natalia
- Prime Suspect (1995, TV series, Episode: "The Lost Child") - Susan Covington
- The Affair (1995, TV film) - Esther
- Thief Takers (1995–1996, TV series) - Cathy Worsley
- Dressing for Breakfast (1995–1998, TV series) - Louise
- The Tenant of Wildfell Hall (1996, TV mini-series) - Annabella
- Bloodlines: Legacy of a Lord (1998) - Kate Manning
- Highlander: Endgame (2000) - Heather MacLeod
- Murder Rooms: Mysteries of the Real Sherlock Holmes (2001, TV series, Episode: "The White Knight Stratagem") - Lyla Milburn
- Animated Tales of the World (2002, TV series, Episode: "King Solomon & the Bee") - Queen of Sheba (voice)
- A Touch of Frost (2003, TV series, Episode: "Hidden Truth") - Sheila Hadley
- My Uncle Silas (2003, TV series, Episode: "The Christening") - Ellen
- Messiah: The Harrowing (2005, TV mini-series) - Grace Eccleshall
- Doctors (2005, TV series, Episode: "Running Free") - Laura Aherne
- Rosemary & Thyme (2006, TV series, Episode: "The Gooseberry Bush") - Penelope Braxton
- Kenneth Williams: Fantabulosa! (2006, TV film) - Joan Sims
- Hotel Babylon (2007, TV series) - Louise
- The Bill (2007, TV series, Episode: "Man Down" - Jessica Stamford
- Miss Pettigrew Lives for a Day (2008) - Mrs. Brummegan
- In Your Dreams (2008) - Zoe
- New Tricks (2009, TV series, Episode: "Last Laugh") - Janet Spencer
- Agatha Christie's Poirot (2009, TV series, Episode: "The Clocks" - Mrs. Hemmings
- Wallander (2010, TV series, Episode: "The Fifth Woman") - Adela Blomberg
- Law & Order: UK (2010, TV series, Episode: "Duty of Care") - Megan Parnell
- Lewis (2013, TV series, Episode: "Down Among the Fearful") - Justine Skinner
- The Coroner (2015–2016, TV series) - Judith Kennedy
- Year of the Rabbit (2019, TV mini-series, Episode: "Gangs") - Miss McHenry
- Poldark (2015–2019, TV series) - Prudence "Prudie" Paynter
- Save the Cinema (2022) - Mrs. Griffiths (Beehive Woman)
- Van der Valk (2022, TV series, Episode: "Plague on Amsterdam") - Cassie Davids
- Am I Being Unreasonable? (2022, TV series) - Carol
- Andor (2022, TV series, Episode: "Announcement") - Judge
