= The Hello Girls =

- Genre: Comedy drama
- Inspired by: Switchboard Operators by Carol Lake
- Directed by: Dermot Boyd; Richard Laxton
- Starring: Letitia Dean; Amy Marston; Helen Sheals; Stephanie Turner; Maggie McCarthy; Samantha Seager; Kate Lonergan; Beverley Klein; Mark Aiken; Martin O'Brien; Colin Wells
- Country of origin: United Kingdom
- Original language: English
- No. of series: 2
- No. of episodes: 16

Original release
- Network: BBC One
- Release: 5 September 1996 – 13 August 1998

The Hello Girls is a British comedy drama that originally aired on BBC One for two series from 5 September 1996 to 13 August 1998. It was inspired by the novel Switchboard Operators written by Carol Lake. The series is set in and around the Derby telephone exchange during 1959 and 1961 respectively.

The Hello Girls was launched with much promotion aimed around former EastEnders actress Letitia Dean, who played Chris Cross, one of the 'girls' who worked at the telephone exchange. It performed very well in the ratings for both series.

The theme tune Busy Line is performed by the main cast (known as 'The Teletones' in the programme).

Each episode is 30 minutes in duration.

== Main cast ==
- Letitia Dean – Chris Cross
- Amy Marston – Sylvia Sands
- Helen Sheals – Ronnie Ferrari
- Stephanie Turner – Miss Armitage
- Maggie McCarthy – Miss Marriott
- Samantha Seager - Val Pepper (Latimer in Series 2)
- Kate Lonergan – Pam Heath
- Beverley Klein – Fanny Fanshaw
- Mark Aiken - Dave Curtis
- Martin O'Brien - Johnny
- Colin Wells - Dick Mandeville

== Episode guide ==
Series One

- 1. First Day (5 September 1996)
- 2. Saturday Shift (12 September 1996)
- 3. The Teletones (19 September 1996)
- 4. Listening In (26 September 1996)
- 5. Baslow 212 (3 October 1996)
- 6. The Occasion Cake (10 October 1996)
- 7. The Emergency Call (17 October 1996)
- 8. Miss GPO Personality 1959 (24 October 1996)

Series Two

- 1. Work To Rule (25 June 1998)
- 2. The Pools (2 July 1998) (5.06m)
- 3. Down Under (9 July 1998) (6.01m)
- 4. Secret Admirer (16 July 1998) (5.37m)
- 5. Fever (23 July 1998) (6.16m)
- 6. Cupids Arrow (30 July 1998) (6.51m)
- 7. The Perfect Joy (6 August 1998) (5.90m)
- 8. Walking Back To Happiness (13 August 1998) (6.75m)

The show was directed by both Dermot Boyd and Richard Laxton
