= Mark Aiken =

Northern Irish actor

- Born: Belfast, Northern Ireland, UK
- Occupation: Actor
- Notable work: The Sarah Jane Adventures

Mark Aiken is an actor from Northern Ireland.

== Biography ==
Aiken was born in Belfast, Northern Ireland and attended The London Academy of Music and Dramatic Art. He has appeared in a number of UK and US TV drama series including 24, CSI: Crime Scene Investigation, The Sarah Jane Adventures, Spooks, Waking the Dead, Jonathan Creek and Soldier Soldier. He also appeared in the third season of Marcella.

He also appeared in the second series of the Gold Blend couple advertisements for Nescafé.

== Selected filmography ==
- Shelley (1990, TV Series) - Constable Myers
- Birds of a Feather (1991, TV Series) - Tom
- Charles and Diana: Unhappily Ever After (1992) – Nick
- Casualty (1993, TV Series) - Michael Volare
- Chiller (1995, TV Series) - Declan O'Hare
- Game On (1995, TV Series) - Male Assistant
- Nelson's Column (1995, TV Series) - Tony
- Thief Takers (1996, TV Series) - Francis Conti
- Dressing for Breakfast (1998, TV Series) - Mike
- The Hello Girls (1998, TV Series) - Dave Curtis
- Jonathan Creek (1999, TV Series) - Robin Priest
- Dubrovnik Twilight (1999) - Tom
- Beast (2000, TV Series) - John
- Black Books (2000, TV Series) - Ben
- Judge John Deed (2001, TV Series) - Roberto Romero
- Merseybeat (2002, TV Series) - Guy Morgan
- Waking the Dead (2002, TV Series) - Tim Walker
- Charmed (2003, TV Series) - Dark Knight
- No Angels (2004, TV Series) - Paul Merchant
- Wonderfalls (2004, TV Series) - Dr. Frank Chambers
- Alias (2005, TV Series) - Fintan Keene
- CSI: NY (2005, TV Series) - Whitman Price
- Las Vegas (2006, TV Series) - Paul Logan
- CSI: Miami (2006, TV Series) - Colin Danville
- 24 (2009, TV Series) - Nichols
- Trinity (2009, TV Series) - Mr. Pearce
- Spooks (2009, TV Series) - Russell Price
- Lewis (2011, TV Series) - Donald Voss
- The Sarah Jane Adventures (2011, TV Series) - Joseph Serf
- The Case (2012, TV Mini-Series) - Paul Carrington
- CSI: Crime Scene Investigation (2012, TV Series) - Arthur Martens
- 100 Streets (2016) - Keith Negotiator
- Astral (2018) - Dr. James Lefler
- Father Brown (2019, TV Series) - Major Basil Winthrop - S7E3 “The Whistle in the Dark”
