= Beyond Betrayal =

1994 television film by Carl Schenkel

- Genre: Action; Drama; Thriller
- Written by: Shelley Evans; Joanna George
- Directed by: Carl Schenkel
- Starring: Susan Dey; Richard Dean Anderson
- Theme music composer: Christopher Franke
- Country of origin: United States
- Original language: English

Production
- Executive producers: Daniel H. Blatt; Judith Paige Mitchell
- Producers: Sam Manners; Randy Nelson
- Production location: Vancouver
- Cinematography: John S. Bartley
- Editor: Jimmy B. Frazier
- Running time: 96 minutes
- Production companies: Daniel H. Blatt Productions; Warner Bros. Television

Original release
- Network: CBS
- Release: October 11, 1994

Beyond Betrayal is a 1994 American made-for-television action drama thriller film directed by Carl Schenkel and starring Susan Dey and Richard Dean Anderson.

== Plot ==
Joanna runs away from her abusive cop husband and meets Sam, who is separated from his obsessive wife.

== Cast ==
- Susan Dey as Joanna / Emma Doyle
- Richard Dean Anderson as Bradley Matthews
- Annie Corley as Iris McKay
- James Tolkan as Joe Maloney
- Michael O'Neill as Ray Pasquerello
- Dennis Boutsikaris as Sam
- Brigitta Dau as Lynn McKay
- Tamsin Kelsey as D.A.
- Jerry Wasserman as Detective
- Arlene Mazerolle as Molly
- Byron Lucas as Biker
- Robin Mossley as Ticket agent
- BJ Harrison as Judge
- Michelle T. Carter as Travel agent
- Dee Jay Jackson as Bus driver

== Reception ==
Reviewer Todd Everett of Variety wrote, "Susan Dey plays an abused wife in 'Beyond Betrayal,' a TV-pic with an unremittingly sick edge that will appeal to some and turn others off. In either event, credit Richard Dean Anderson with a performance so creepy that masks of his character could be Halloween bestsellers." The review concludes, "Truth is, thanks to the strong performances, Carl Schenkel's imaginative direction and Christopher Franke's spiky score, there'd be plenty of suspense without artificial enhancement."

A review in People on October 10, 1994, called the film "well-acted by all involved, particularly Anderson. The former star of MacGyver, who is establishing a solid second career as a TV-movie villain, forges another scary monster here."
