= Amy Marston =

English actress

- Born: 1972 (age 53–54); Birmingham, Warwickshire, England
- Occupation: Actor
- Years active: 1995–present

Amy Jessica Marston (born 1972) is an English actress on screen and in theatre. She is known for her roles as Sylvia Sands in The Hello Girls, as Deborah in Rome, and as Jenny Rawlinson in EastEnders.

== Film and television career ==
In 1996, Marston made her debut appearance on television in the mini-series Neverwhere, playing the role of Anasthesia for two episodes, in a cast which included Tamsin Greig and Peter Capaldi. Between 1996 and 1998, she played Sylvia Sands for 16 episodes of The Hello Girls alongside Letitia Dean.

In 2004, Marston played Priscilla Stanbury in the 4-part BBC miniseries He Knew He Was Right alongside Bill Nighy, Geoffrey Palmer and David Tennant. In 2007, she portrayed Deborah for six episodes of the historical drama Rome.

In 2012, she appeared in the feature film Bel Ami, alongside Christina Ricci, Kristin Scott Thomas and Uma Thurman. She co-starred with Jamie Dornan in the 2014 TV mini-series New Worlds for three episodes. In 2016, she played the role of Jenny Rawlinson in EastEnders . In 2019 she appeared in The Current War, alongside Benedict Cumberbatch, Michael Shannon and Nicholas Hoult. In 2019, she appeared in an episode of the BBC soap opera Doctors as Shannon Wren.

In 2024, she played young Patricia in the television series Insomnia.

== Theatre career ==
Marston was nominated for the 2018 Offie for 'Best female in a play' - as Sylvia Gellburg in Broken Glass at the Watford Palace Theatre.

== Filmography ==
Film
Year	Title	Role
2001	Charlotte Gray	Pregnant Mother
2008	Love Letters (short film)	Helen
2009	The Imaginarium of Doctor Parnassus	Classy Shopper 1
2010	Toast	Primary School Teacher
2012	Bel Ami	Nanny
2015	Crown for Christmas (TV film)	Miss Wick
2016	Little Hard (short film)	Lo
2017	Potty Mouth	Runner
2017	A Christmas Prince (TV film)	Max Golding
2018	Six from Eight	Mary
2018	The Little Stranger	Mrs. Blundell
2019	The Current War	Annabelle Worthington
2020	Big Boys Don't Cry	Mary
2021	Operation Mincemeat	Nurse Tate
2021	Seacole	Alice's Neighbour

Television
Year	Title	Role
1995–2018	Casualty	Mattie Reynold (1995)/ Ginny Everly (2010)/ Lisa Adams (2018)
1996	Neverwhere	Anasthesia (2 episodes)
1996	Over Here	Daphne (Producer)
1996–1998	The Hello Girls	Sylvia Sands (16 episodes)
1997	Black Velvet Band	Half-Pint
1997	The History of Tom Jones: a Foundling	Susan (1 episode)
1997	The Bill	Sandra Winter (1 episode)
1998	Faith in the Future	Salesgirl (1 episode)
1999	Where the Heart Is	Julie Cartland
2000	The Mrs Bradley Mysteries	Agnes Delamere
2002	Judge John Deed	Darina Hay (1 episode)
2002–2007	Doctors	Becca Nash (2002) / Hayley (2007)
2004	The Final Quest	Agnes
2004	He Knew He Was Right	Priscilla Stanbury (3 episodes)
2005	Man Stroke Woman	Customer (1 episode)
2005	Jericho	Annie Wilson (1 episode)
2006-2014	Holby City	Nicola Davis (2014) / Carrie Haines (2006) (2 episodes)
2007	Doc Martin	Terri Oakwood
2007	The Last Detective	Rose Boden
2007	Rome	Deborah (5 episodes)
2008	Consuming Passion: 100 Years of Mills & Boon	Margaret Boon
2009	Kingdom	Miss Dodds (1 episode)
2010	At Home with the Georgians	Anne Dormer
2012	Dark Matters: Twisted But True	Juanita Lopez / Dr. Brenda Milner (2 episodes)
2014	New Worlds	Martha Hawkins (3 episodes)
2015	The Coroner	Olivia Sidwell (Napoleon's Violin, S1:E8)
2015	DCI Banks	Dr. Beverley Calcutt (Ghosts: Part 1, 2015)
2016	EastEnders	Jenny Rawlinson (2 episodes)
2017	Endeavour	Sister Clodagh MacMahon (1 episode)
2017	Quacks	Laura (1 episode)
2018	Vera	Glenda Jannen (1 episode)
2019	Doctors	Shannon Wren
2019	Summer of Rockets	Miss Goodwin
2021	Manhunt	Diamanda (episode: The Night Stalker: Part 2)
2021	Showtrial	Lydia Vendler (2 episodes - Velleities and Lady Tease)
2023	A Kind of Spark	Miss Murphy
2023	Silent Witness	Amy Nystrom, Series 26 episode 5 - "Star, Part 1"
2024	Insomnia (TV series)	Young Patricia - 4 episodes

== Stage ==
Year	Title	Role	Theatre
1995	Unidentified Human Remains	Benita (lead role)	Manchester Royal Exchange
1995	The Children's Hour	Catherine	National Theatre
1999	Eurydice	Eurydice (lead role)	Whitehall Theatre
1999	Sitting Pretty	Zelda	Chelsea Theatre
2000	Ghost Train Tattoo	Lisa	Manchester Royal Exchange
2000	Snake In A Fridge	Donna	Manchester Royal Exchange
2000	Snapshots	Lian (lead role)	Manchester Royal Exchange
2001	Henna Night	Judith	Chelsea Theatre
2003	After Mrs Rochester	Maryvonne & Jane Eyre	Shared Experience
2005	Enlightenment	Joanna	Abbey Theatre, Dublin
2008	Humble Boy	Rosie Pye	Northampton Theatre Royal
2009	Don John	Elvira	BAC & Tour
2012	Stepping Out	Andy	Salisbury Playhouse
2012	Man In The Middle	Kathy Lette/Interrogator	Theatre503
2014	A Small Family Business	Harriet Ayres	National Theatre
2015	Feed the Beast	Heather/Curator of Chequers/Ensemble	Birmingham Repertory Theatre
2018	Parents' Evening	Mother (lead role)	Jermyn Street Theatre
2018	Broken Glass	Sylvia Gellburg (lead role) *Offie Nominated Best Actress	Watford Palace Theatre

== Awards and nominations ==
Year	Award	Category	Nominated work	Result	Ref.
2018	The Offies	Best Female in a Play	Broken Glass, Watford Palace Theatre	Nominated	
