= Dressing for Breakfast =

- Genre: Sitcom
- Created by: Stephanie Calman
- Starring: Beatie Edney; Holly Aird; Charlotte Cornwell; Nigel Lindsay; Mark Aiken
- Country of origin: United Kingdom
- Original language: English
- No. of series: 3
- No. of episodes: 21

Production
- Running time: 30 minutes
- Production company: Warner Sisters Productions

Original release
- Network: Channel 4
- Release: 24 November 1995 – 27 February 1998

Dressing for Breakfast is a Channel 4 sitcom which ran between 24 November 1995 and 27 February 1998 about two women, Louise (Beatie Edney) and Carla (Holly Aird).

The series was based on a 1988 book with the same title by Stephanie Calman who also wrote the series.

== Storyline ==
The plot mainly concerns 29-year-old jewellery maker/seller Louise and her quest to find the perfect man. Her interfering left wing activist mother Liz (Charlotte Cornwell) gets in the way. In her search for a boyfriend she makes some wrong choices and gets advice from best friend Carla and her husband Dave (Nigel Lindsay).

== Reception ==
The TV series was generally well received. It gained acclaim for featuring strong female characters and its frank look at female sexuality. It proved popular with audiences and was commissioned for three series broadcast between 1995 and 1998.

== Cast ==
The cast included:

- Beatie Edney as Louise
- Holly Aird as Carla
- Charlotte Cornwell as Liz
- Nigel Lindsay as Dave
- Mark Aiken as Mike (S3)
- Sophie Stanton as Rose
- Robert Langdon Lloyd as Fabrizio (S1)
- Philip Glenister as Mark (S1 Ep2)
- Andrew Clover as Laurence (S3)
- Richard Durden as Graham (S2)
- Lucy Robinson as Sarah (S3)
- Sam Kelly as Creepy Man
- Omid Djalili as Turkish Man (S1 Ep4)
- Ray Fearon as Steve (S1 Ep4)
- Juliette Gruber as Sophie (S1 Ep4)
- Danny Webb as John (S2 Ep3)
- Victoria Carling as Elaine (S2 Ep3)

== Trivia ==
There was only a 13-year age difference between Charlotte Cornwell who portrayed Louise's mother and Beatie Edney (Louise).
