= Legend (TV series) =

TV series

- Intertitle
- Genre: Science fiction Western
- Created by: Michael Piller; Bill Dial
- Starring: Richard Dean Anderson; John de Lancie; Mark Adair Rios; Jarrad Paul
- Composer: Ken Harrison
- Country of origin: United States
- Original language: English
- No. of seasons: 1
- No. of episodes: 12

Production
- Executive producers: Bill Dial; Michael Piller; Richard Dean Anderson; Michael Greenburg
- Running time: 45 minutes
- Production companies: Gekko Film Corporation; Mike and Bill Productions; Paramount Television

Original release
- Network: UPN
- Release: April 18 – August 22, 1995

Legend is a science fiction Western television series that ran on UPN from April 18, 1995, until August 22, 1995, with one final re-airing of the pilot on July 3, 1996. It starred Richard Dean Anderson and John de Lancie.

== Plot ==
Ernest Pratt, a gambling, womanizing, cowardly, hard-drinking writer has created a literary hero, Nicodemus Legend, the main character in a series of dime novels set in the West. Because Pratt writes the novels in the first person and has posed as Legend for their cover art, many readers believe that Pratt is Nicodemus Legend.

In the pilot episode, when Pratt learns that Nicodemus Legend has been impersonated and a warrant issued for his arrest, he travels to the scene of the incident to clear the name of his protagonist.

Pratt meets up with the impersonator, who turns out to be a great admirer of his tales, the eccentric European scientist Janos Bartok – a Nikola Tesla analogue who had been Thomas Edison's research partner – and his brilliant assistant Huitzilopochtli Ramos, who has taken every single course Harvard University had to offer. Bartok "borrowed" the Legend persona in order to help the townspeople of Sheridan, Colorado.

They enlist the reluctant Pratt to their cause, and show him how their scientific expertise and outlandish inventions (frequently based on ideas from Pratt's books) can bolster the impression that Pratt really is Nicodemus Legend. Bartok says:

Your celebrity has the power to give our enemies pause. My science can increase that reputation. And together, we will create the real Legend.

Suffering from writer's block and inspired at the thought of doing good, Pratt agrees to assume the persona of his literary creation and to live as the image he created of an adventurous and heroic man. Together, they adventure throughout the West solving mysteries, capturing wrong doers, and making scientific discoveries.

== Characters ==
Richard Dean Anderson and John de Lancie as Ernest Pratt and Janos Bartok

=== Main ===
- Ernest Pratt, played by Richard Dean Anderson, was born into a good, conservative Boston family in 1836 and attended Harvard College for a short time, where he fell under the spell of the Romantic poets and Gothic literature. Defying his banker father, Pratt decided to pursue the life of a writer and headed west to San Francisco where he became an apprentice reporter for the San Francisco Chronicle. A chance meeting with Mark Twain changed Pratt's life and inspired the young man to set to work on his first successful book, Solitary Knight of the High Plains, which introduced the dashing hero, Nicodemus Legend. Pratt's technique of writing in the first person helps give his readers the impression that Legend's exploits are real.
- Nicodemus Legend, also played by Anderson, is the fictional hero of numerous popular novels by Ernest Pratt. Legend is a champion of the underdog, a crusader for justice and truth. His perfect manners, good looks, courage and dedication, and beautiful hand-beaded buckskin outfits make him a dashing and romantic figure. Legend is tough and quick-witted with an impressive knowledge of science. He hates violence, preferring to use brains instead of a gun. In sharp contrast with Pratt, Legend does not drink, smoke, or indulge in sexual activity, although frequently approached by attractive women. Since Pratt's novels are written in the first person from Legend's point of view, many readers fail to realize that Legend is a fictitious character.
- Janos Bartok, played by John de Lancie, was born in Hungary in 1840. He speaks five languages and is a prodigy in mathematics and electrical engineering. Bartok is fascinated with all aspects of life, from the discovery of new scientific advancements to spiritualism and extra-sensory perception and especially with the idea that man will one day fly. After winning a scholarship to the University of Budapest, Bartok came to New York to work at Western Union where he met the young Thomas Edison. A bitter competition developed between these two brilliant scientists. Eventually, Edison destroyed Bartok's reputation by claiming that Bartok had stolen his ideas. Tiring of the scandal and the resulting media attention, Bartok left New York and headed West, settling in Colorado to continue his experiments. His financial backing comes from a wealthy widow in Denver with scientific interests and perhaps other interests in Bartok. In his leisure time he reads the humorous novels of Mark Twain and a series of dime novels which chronicle the adventures of Nicodemus Legend. Janos Bartok was inspired by Serbian scientist Nikola Tesla.

=== Recurring ===
- Huitzilopochtli Ramos, played by Mark Adair Rios, is Mexican, a descendant of Aztec kings who has inherited the great Aztec genius for mathematics. His first name, Huitzilopochtli, means "Hummingbird of the South" and was the name of the chief tribal God in the Aztec religion. Ramos' brilliance was recognized early in his life, and he eventually went to work for a Harvard archaeologist on a dig in Mexico. The archaeologist was so impressed by Ramos' intellect that he helped the young man get a scholarship to Harvard. As a running joke, Ramos was described in several different episodes as having a degree in a wide variety of different specialties. The character was a sharp distinction from the cliche image of the mad scientist's assistant, as Ramos is fiercely intelligent in his own right. Ramos is fiercely devoted to Bartok, whom he met when they were both working for Western Union. Bartok in turn is unstinting in his praise for Ramos.
- Skeeter, played by Jarrad Paul, is Legend's version of the Artful Dodger who seems to come from nowhere and live nowhere, but who's always around and into things.
- Harry Parver, played by Bob Balaban, is the representative of Pratt's publisher. He is an Easterner who is fascinated by the West but quite out of place in it. Parver is a businessman surrounded by geniuses, dreamers and lunatics. It is his job to be concerned with deadlines, re-writes and promotional stunts to keep the Legend books at the top of the best-seller lists.

== Episodes ==
No.	Title	Directed by	Written by	Original release date	Prod. code
1	"Birth of a Legend"	Charles Correll	Michael Piller & Bill Dial	April 18, 1995	001–002
In the 1870s West, a boozing dime novelist, Ernest Pratt, assumes the identity of his books' hero, Nicodemus Legend. In the opener, Legend helps a group of immigrant farmers protect themselves from a greedy landowner. Note: This was broadcast as a double length episode (premiere).
2	"Mr. Pratt Goes to Sheridan"	William Gereghty	Michael Piller & Bill Dial	April 25, 1995	004
A notorious bank robber who's accused of murder announces he'll give himself up - but only to Legend. Meanwhile, Pratt has trouble adhering to his literary creation's lifestyle.
3	"Legend on His President's Secret Service"	Michael Vejar	Bob Wilcox	May 2, 1995	003
Pratt must thwart a plot to assassinate President Ulysses S. Grant hatched by a group of Texans unhappy with the outcome of the Civil War.
4	"Custer's Next to Last Stand"	William Gereghty	Bill Dial	May 9, 1995	006
While a mysterious figure from his past stalks him, Pratt helps General Custer expose corruption inside the War Department.
5	"The Life, Death, and Life of Wild Bill Hickok"	Michael Caffey	Peter Allan Fields	May 16, 1995	007
Having lost much of his eyesight and confidence, Wild Bill Hickok -- a legend in his own right -- enlists the help of Nicodemus Legend in bringing down a band of train robbers.
6	"Knee-High Noon"	James L. Conway	Steve Stolier & Frederick Rappaport	May 23, 1995	008
An aggressive stage mother manipulates Pratt into promoting the career of her bratty son, who fancies the role of "Legend Junior." Meanwhile, Pratt investigates a pair of cattle rustlers.
7	"The Gospel According to Legend"	Michael Vejar	John Considine	June 12, 1995	009
A preacher encourages the townspeople to reject Bartok's scientific experiments as the devil's work, but his motives are less than divine.
8	"Bone of Contention"	Charles Correll	George Geiger	June 20, 1995	010
Legend winds up in the middle of a feud between competing paleontologists who think they've made the find of the century in Sheridan.
9	"Revenge of the Herd"	Bob Balaban	Tim Burns	July 4, 1995	005
Pratt and Bartok concoct a scheme to stop a German hunting party from slaughtering a buffalo herd prized by an Arapaho Indian tribe.
10	"Fall of a Legend"	Michael Vejar	Bob Shane & Ron Friedman	July 18, 1995	011
When Pratt is wrongly accused of murder and lands on the Sheriff's Most Wanted List, he learns that with his famous face, there's nowhere to hide.
11	"Clueless in San Francisco"	Charles Correll	Carol Caldwell & Marianne Clarkson	July 25, 1995	012
Pratt goes home to San Francisco to help a woman who was raised by Indians find her biological parents, but some folks there would prefer she didn't succeed.
12	"Skeletons in the Closet"	Steve Shaw	David Rich	August 8, 1995	013
A skeleton wearing an Aztec ring awakens Ramos's sense of Mexican heritage, sending him on a search for the killer that leads to a town full of racial discord.

== Production ==
=== Development ===
Legend was originally conceived as a TV movie before it was picked up as a series.

=== Filming ===
It was shot on location in Mescal and Tucson, Arizona, from January to June 1995.

== Broadcast history ==
The series was a Gekko Film Corp production in association with Bill & Mike Productions for Paramount Network Television, broadcast on UPN.

Twelve episodes were aired, including the 2-hour pilot episode. Despite critical praise, this program aired during UPN's first year of existence and after a change in network management, along with lower than expected ratings, the show was canceled along with almost every other program aired on the UPN lineup. TV Land aired reruns of all episodes around 1999.

== Other media ==
=== DVD ===
On January 5, 2016, Mill Creek Entertainment released Legend – The Complete Series on DVD in Region 1 for the very first time. However, over ten hours of runtime is spread on just two discs, which means a sub-standard bitrate.

=== Novels ===
While no actual Legend novels were produced, several titles were referenced in the series, in keeping with the plot device of using gimmicks from Pratt's novels.

Novel	Plot
Solitary Knight of the High Plains	The character of Legend is introduced to the reading public.
Land of the Orange Sky	Legend helps a school teacher lady in Colorado.
Legend and Cherokee Joe	Legend takes a bad fall.
Blood on the Texas Sands	Includes the quadrovelocipede.
The Chase Through the Booby-Trapped Arroyos	Also includes the quadrovelocipede.
Legend and the Ghost of the Chiricahuas	A novel that would worry a gunfighter.
Legend and the Massacre at Mesquite Flat	Disarmed and disabled five Apaches in this book.
Double Shadows	Legend helps out the Payson twins, who were accused of a crime they didn't commit. Set in Amarillo, Texas.
The Mystery of the Feathercreek Murder	Legend uses forensic science to solve a murder.
When Legend Came Marching Home	Legend is a Yankee cavalry hero, who was with the 5th Michigan Volunteer Cavalry Regiment, coming home after the American Civil War.
Blood on the Moonlit Prairie	Used a night vision device.
Legend and the Guns of Brothers	Legend versus the James-Younger Gang.
Wheels Across Montana	Stage Robbers rob a coach by coming up from behind.
Dry Gulch	Crossing the desert.
Borderline	Takes place in El Paso del Norte and features the colorful Mexican street Camino Real.
Legend's Lost Love	About Clementine, Legend's first love, whom the angels took from him.
Legend Meets Frontier Laddie	Legend teams up with a Collie dog.

== Reception ==
Jeff Jarvis of TV Guide appreciated the show's attempt to follow up The Adventures of Brisco County, Jr., as another Western with wry humor, but he ultimately didn't recommend it. Jarvis said that while the show is "cute" and that Anderson and de Lancie "click together", he called the show "dull" when it should be "exciting". David Bianculli of the Daily News received Legend more positively. He liked the two starring actors, and said the Western science-fiction format of the show "provides far more fun, and sly intelligence, than viewers might initially suspect." Writing in the New York Post, John Podhoretz called Legend "a gorgeous amalgam of science fiction and old-fashioned Western," noting it was "eerily similar" to The Adventures of Brisco County, Jr. He said the pilot episode was "an engaging piece of work" which was "photographed with stunning care and taste."
