= Pavel Douglas =

Polish-born British actor (born 1951)

Pavel Douglas (born 5 January 1951) is a Polish-born British actor.

== Biography ==
Douglas was born in Kraków on 5 January 1951, and was naturalised in 1959. By the end of the 1970s, having been brought up in Scotland and France, he made his first credited television debut with a small part in the television series Shoestring.

== Career ==
In 1983, he appeared as a salesman in a training video for Austin Rover, alongside Nicholas Ball.

During the mid-1980s, Douglas was credited as "Captain" in two episodes of Robin of Sherwood. In 1988 and 1989, he appeared in several episodes of EastEnders as minor character Gregory Mantel, who was notably the character responsible for ordering the hit on Den Watts. He is also known for the role of Lord Alexander Felsham in the many series of BBC's Lovejoy (1986–93).

In December 1989, Douglas appeared on BBC 1's adaptation of The Voyage of the Dawn Treader as Lord Bern.

He has since taken on many more television and feature film roles including Charles Devon in Passport to Murder (1993), John "The Red" Comyn in The Bruce (1996), French Warship Captain in GoldenEye (1995), Nigel Wheeler in Heartbeat (1996), and Chris Duncan in Silent Witness (2006). He also provided the voices for Big Ears and Mr. Plod (specials only) in children's animated series, Make Way for Noddy in 2002. In 2007, he guest starred in Doctors, where he portrayed the role of Chief Superintendent Leo Jackson. This won him and the cast "Best Single Episode" at the 2007 British Soap Awards. As of 2007, he has appeared as Patrick Johnston in River City for BBC Scotland. In 2008, he appeared as Captain Lindeman in the television film "Krakatoa", in 2009 as Commander John McDowell in Stockwell for ITV, and in 2010 as Jonothan Owen in Holby City for the BBC.

In 2007, he appeared in the Channel 4 documentary Extraordinary Breastfeeding, where his wife explained why she was still breastfeeding their children as they were growing up.

In 2024 Pavl Douglas joined the Christmas Special episode of The Madame Blanc Mysteries, as Frederick.

== Filmography ==
Year	Film	Role	Notes
1995	GoldenEye	French Warship Captain	
1996	The Bruce	John 'Red' Comyn, Lord of Badenoch	
2002	Make Way for Noddy	Big Ears	UK re-dub
2015	Crown for Christmas	Fergus	Hallmark Channel movie
