= Crown for Christmas =

American made-for-television film

- DVD cover
- Written by: Neal H. Dobrofsky; Tippi Dobrofsky; Michael Damian
- Directed by: Alex Zamm
- Starring: Danica McKellar; Rupert Penry-Jones; Pavel Douglas
- Music by: Chris Hajian
- Country of origin: United States
- Original language: English

Production
- Executive producers: Eric Jarboe; Brad Krevoy; Amanda Phillips Atkins; Jimmy Townsend
- Producer: Amy Krell
- Cinematography: Viorel Sergovici
- Editors: Charles Norris; Heath Ryan
- Running time: 86 minutes
- Production companies: Maid Productions LLC; Cinedigm Home Entertainment LLC

Original release
- Network: Hallmark Channel
- Release: November 27, 2015

Crown for Christmas is a 2015 American made-for-television romantic comedy film starring Danica McKellar and Rupert Penry-Jones. The film premiered on Hallmark Channel on November 27, 2015, as part of their Countdown to Christmas seasonal programming block.

== Plot ==
Alison "Allie" Evans (Danica McKellar) is an American hotel maid who was fired for not getting an important guest's room ready in time. Overhearing this, a hotel patron's servant, Fergus (Pavel Douglas), hires her to be a governess for his employer's daughter in the country of Winshire. When Allie accepts and arrives in the country, she finds that Fergus' employer is widower King Maximillian (Rupert Penry-Jones) and that his daughter is Princess Theodora (Ellie Botterill) who has become mischievous since her mother's death. But, she meets her match in Allie, as Allie single-handedly raised her younger brother and sister following their parents' deaths.

When not busy looking after the princess, Allie befriends the other staff members. All while King Maximillian is being pressured by Chancellor Riggs (Colin McFarlane) to become engaged to Lady Celia (Alexandra Evans). Theodora has some objections to this as she thinks Allie would be a better match. When the party arrives, Allie is invited, much to the jealousy and irritation of Lady Celia and to hers and Max’s dismay, the wedding ring has gone missing.

After Princess Theodora steals a ring from her future stepmother, Lady Celia, as an act of rebellion, Allie confronts her about the theft, understanding the deeper reasons behind Theodora’s behavior. Allie recognizes that the young princess is lashing out due to her unresolved grief over her mother and fears that her father’s engagement to Lady Celia will lead to further emotional loss. With patience and kindness, Allie helps Theodora understand her own feelings, encouraging her to return the ring and apologize, which slowly softens Theodora’s heart and strengthens her bond with Allie.

During this time, King Maximillian grows increasingly impressed with Allie’s gentle influence over his daughter. He sees how Allie manages to break through Theodora’s tough exterior and bring out her vulnerable, playful side. This connection only deepens Max’s feelings for Allie, as he finds himself captivated by her warmth, resilience, and down-to-earth spirit.

Despite her growing affection for the king, Allie is keenly aware of the social gulf between them. Lady Celia, sensing the king’s interest in Allie, becomes cold and dismissive, making it clear that Allie, as a former maid, does not belong in their world. Allie begins to consider leaving the castle, worried that her presence might cause tension and negatively impact Max’s engagement.

Meanwhile, Max is also wrestling with his duty to his country and the arranged marriage to Lady Celia, which is more about political alliance than love. However, as Christmas Eve approaches, he realizes he cannot deny his feelings for Allie. In a private moment, he confides in her about the pressures he faces and how she has brought light and joy back into his life, making him question what he truly wants for his future.

The night of the royal Christmas Ball, Max makes a pivotal decision. He publicly calls off his engagement to Lady Celia, choosing instead to pursue a life with Allie. The crowd is shocked, but Theodora beams with happiness, having seen the connection between her father and Allie. In a romantic and heartfelt moment, Max declares his love for Allie in front of the guests, effectively choosing love over duty.

Allie, deeply moved, accepts his proposal, and the story concludes with the three of them—Max, Allie, and Theodora—embracing their new family bond as they celebrate Christmas together.

== Production ==
The film's story was written by former 80's pop singer Michael Damian, who is known for writing other royalty-themed Christmas movies such as A Princess for Christmas and A Royal Christmas. The film was shot in Romania and Slovenia.

== Cast ==
- Danica McKellar as Allie Evans
- Rupert Penry-Jones as King Maximillian
- Ellie Botterill as Princess Theodora
- Deborah Moore as Mrs. Hinden
- Cristian Bota as Carter
- Alexandra Evans as Countess Celia
- Pavel Douglas as Fergus
- Amy Marston as Miss Wick
- Colin McFarlane as Chancellor Riggs
- Emma Sutton as Mrs. Claiborne
