= Ordinary Heroes (1986 film) =

1986 film Peter H. Cooper

- Genre: Drama; War
- Written by: Ira R. Barmak
- Directed by: Peter H. Cooper
- Starring: Richard Dean Anderson; Valerie Bertinelli; Doris Roberts
- Music by: Perry Botkin Jr.
- Country of origin: United States
- Original language: English

Production
- Producer: Ira R. Barmak
- Production locations: Park City, Utah (Bandinis interior); Provo, Utah (Bandinis Exterior); Salt Lake City
- Cinematography: Hal Trussell
- Editor: Mark Rosenbaum
- Running time: 105 minutes
- Production company: Crow Productions

Original release
- Network: ABC
- Release: October 19, 1986

Ordinary Heroes is a 1986 American made-for-television war drama film directed by Peter H. Cooper. It premiered on ABC on October 19, 1986.

The film is a remake of the 1945 film Pride of the Marines, but set in the Vietnam War instead of World War II.

== Plot ==
In 1971, Tony (Richard Dean Anderson) fell in love with Maria (Valerie Bertinelli), but their future was abruptly put on hold when Tony was drafted to fight in the Vietnam War. When he returned to the country two years later, she was still waiting for him, but he was no longer the same.

== Cast and characters ==
- Richard Dean Anderson as Tony Kaiser
- Valerie Bertinelli as Maria Pezzo
- Doris Roberts as Edith Burnside
- Jesse D. Goins as Ken Bryant
- Matthew Laurance as Dr. Farber
- Richard Baxter as Steve Burnside
- Emily Love as Tina Burnside
- Liz Torres as Miss Cortez

== Production ==
Parts of the film were shot in Salt Lake City and Magna, Utah.
