= John Bartley =

American cinematographer (1947–2025)

- Born: John Stanley Bartley; February 12, 1947; Wellington, New Zealand
- Died: August 17, 2025 (aged 78); Los Angeles, California, U.S.
- Other name: John S. Bartley
- Occupation: Cinematographer
- Years active: 1978–2025

John Stanley Bartley, A.S.C. C.S.C. (February 12, 1947 – August 17, 2025) was a New Zealand-born Canadian cinematographer, best known for his work on television series such as Lost, Bates Motel and The X Files and feature films such as The X Files: I Want to Believe and The Chronicles of Riddick.

== Life and career ==
Bartley was raised in Wellington, where he didn't get to watch television until his early teens, and even then only one channel was broadcasting in New Zealand. In an interview he said that National Velvet and The Bridge on the River Kwai were two of his favorite films when he was young.

In 1995, Bartley received his first Emmy Award nomination in the category "Outstanding Individual Achievement in Cinematography for a Series" for The X-Files episode "One Breath". He lost the award to Tim Suhrstedt for Chicago Hope. Bartley was nominated the following year for The X Files episode "Grotesque", in the same category, and won the award. Bartley was also nominated for an Emmy in the Outstanding Cinematography For A One Hour Series category for the Lost episode "The Constant."

Bartley died on August 17, 2025, at the age of 78.

== Filmography ==
=== As cinematographer or director of photography ===
==== Film ====
- Grand Unified Theory (2016)
- Hunting Season (2013)
- Innocent (2011)
- 17th Precinct (2011)
- The X Files: I Want to Believe (2008)
- The Prince of Motor City (2008)
- Gray Matters (2006)
- Odd Girl Out (2005)
- The Nickel Children (2005)
- Naughty or Nice (2004)
- The Chronicles of Riddick (2004)
- Alien Lockdown (2004)
- Wrong Turn (2003)
- Then Came Jones (2003)
- Spinning Boris (2003)
- Eight Legged Freaks (2002)
- The Matthew Shepard Story (2002)
- Another Life (2002)
- Black River (2001)
- See Spot Run (2001)
- HRT (2001)
- Where the Money Is (2000)
- A Cooler Climate (1999)
- Masters of Horror and Suspense (1999)
- A Feeling Called Glory (1999)
- Disturbing Behavior (1998)
- Tricks (1997)
- Echo (1997)
- The X-Files: The Unopened File (1996)
- Beyond Betrayal (1994)
- Another Stakeout (1993)
- Jumpin' Joe (1992)
- Home Movie (1992)
- Yes Virginia, There Is a Santa Claus (1991)
- Sky High (1990)
- Beyond the Stars (1989)

==== Television ====
- Wu Assassins (2019)
  - 10 episodes
- Insomnia (2018)
  - 8 episodes
- The Good Doctor (2017–2018)
  - 9 episodes
- iZombie (2015)
  - pilot
- Bates Motel (2013)
  - 45 episodes
- Vikings (2013)
  - 9 episodes
- Charlie's Angels (2011)
  - 2 episodes
- Dragon Age: Redemption (2011)
  - 6 episodes
- Undercovers (2010–2011)
  - 6 episodes
- Lost (2005–2010)
  - 51 episodes
- Glory Days (2002)
  - 9 episodes
- Roswell (1999)
  - 4 episodes
- The X files (1993–1996)
  - 62 episodes
- The Commish (1991–1993)
  - 44 episodes
- Broken Badges (1991)
  - 3 episodes
- 21 Jump Street (1990–1991)
  - 8 episodes
- Booker (1990)
  - 12 episodes
- Wiseguy (1990)
  - 2 episodes

=== As other crew ===
- The Room Upstairs (1987)
- Backfire (1987)
- The Boy Who Could Fly (1986)
- Love Is Never Silent (1985)
- Picking Up the Pieces (1985)
- Love, Mary (1985)
- The Journey of Natty Gann (1985)
- The Glitter Dome (1984)
- The Three Wishes of Billy Grier (1984)
- Secrets of a Married Man (1984)
- Spacehunter: Adventures in the Forbidden Zone (1983)
- Packin' It In (1983)
- A Piano for Mrs. Cimino (1982)
- The Babysitter (1980)
- Mr. Patman (1980)
- Bear Island (1979)
- Who'll Save Our Children? (1978)
