= Stephanie Turner (British actress) =

British actress (born 1944)

- Born: 25 May 1944 (age 82); Bradford, West Riding of Yorkshire, England
- Occupation: Actress
- Years active: 1967–2010

Stephanie Turner (born 25 May 1944) is an English retired actress. She is best known for the lead role of Inspector Jean Darblay in the first three series of the 1980s television BBC police drama Juliet Bravo (1980–82).

== Early life ==
Turner was born in Bradford, West Riding of Yorkshire.

== Career ==
Her first notable television role was as Shirley Walton in 5 episodes of Coronation Street in 1968. In 1974 she appeared in an episode of Special Branch as Jean Gosling, sister of Frank Gosling played by Dennis Waterman, a year later she appeared again with Waterman in three episodes of The Sweeney (1975), playing his on-screen wife, Alison Carter. Her regular role as the featured character WPC Howarth in Z-Cars (1971–75) stood her in good stead for the future role of Inspector Jean Darblay.

She appeared in a 1975 episode of Public Eye as Julia Sissons, a 'missing' common-law wife-turned-barmaid. She also made an appearance in Whatever Happened To The Likely Lads and played a recurring role as Jessie Naylor, née Maugham, in Series 2 of Sam (1974).

In 1980, after losing out to Jill Gascoine for the role of DI Maggie Forbes in ITV's The Gentle Touch (the first British police drama with a female lead), Turner won the role of Inspector Jean Darblay in the rival BBC series Juliet Bravo, which started airing four months after The Gentle Touch. Turner left the programme after the third series, replaced by Anna Carteret as Inspector Kate Longton.

In the 1990s, she was in each episode of The Hello Girls as Miss Armitage, a supervisor of a 1950s GPO switchboard; and played Mrs Hope Q.C. in two episodes of At Home with the Braithwaites.

Having worked in various roles between the 1960s and 2000s on stage, on radio, on television and as a director, Turner retired from acting in 2010. In more recent years she has helped to direct drama students, had a share in an antiques business, and volunteered with InterAct Stroke Support (a charity that allows actors to read to patients following a stroke).

== Selected filmography ==
Year	Title	Role	Notes
1968	Coronation Street	Shirley Walton	5 episodes
1968	Softly, Softly	Rita Ray	Episode: "Five Pairs of Hands"
1970	Doomwatch	Toni Harker	Episode: "Survival Code"
1970	Morning Story	Mrs. Woolford	TV movie
1971	Owen M.D.	Molly Christie	2 episodes
1971 – 1975	Z-Cars	WPC Howarth	16 episodes
1972	Play for Today	Jane	Episode: "The Reporters"
1973	Crown Court	Allison James	Episode: "No Spoiling (Part 3)"
1973	Whatever Happened To The Likely Lads	Mary	Episode: "Birthday Boy"
1974	Sam	Jessie Taylor (née Maugham)	8 episodes
1974	Special Branch	Jean Gosling	Episode: "Stand and Deliver"
1975	Public Eye	Julia Sissons	Episode: "What's to Become Of Us?"
1975	The Sweeney	Alison Carter	3 episodes
1977	Play for Today	Gillian Otway	Episode: "A Photograph"
1978	Emmerdale	Ruth Hepton	12 episodes
1980	ITV Playhouse	Helen	Episode: "The Specialist"
1980 – 1982	Juliet Bravo	Inspector Jean Darblay	44 episodes
1985	Theatre Night	Mrs. Erlynne	Episode: "Lady Windermere's Fan"
1990	Screen Two	Podust	Episode: "Small Zones"
1991	Boon	Jeanette Jakes	Episode: "Two Men in a Vault"
1992	Casualty	Dinah Reynolds	Episode: "Profit and Loss"
1992	Van der Valk	Elis Kortman	Episode: "Still Waters"
1993	The Bill	Marcia Thompson	Episode: "Delinquent"
1995	Peak Practice	Doreen Rawlings	Episode: "Giving Up"
1996	A Touch of Frost	Mrs. Jarvis	Episode: "Deep Waters"
1996 – 1998	The Hello Girls	Miss Armitage	16 episodes
2003	At Home with the Braithwaites	Mrs Hope Q.C.	2 episodes
2006	Doctors	Gwen Clancy	Episode: "Igonarance is Bliss"
