= MacGyver: Lost Treasure of Atlantis =

American TV movie

- Written by: Lee David Zlotoff, John Sheppard
- Directed by: Michael Vejar
- Starring: Richard Dean Anderson; Brian Blessed
- Country of origin: United States
- Original language: English

Production
- Producer: Richard Dean Anderson
- Running time: 95 minutes

Original release
- Release: May 14, 1994

MacGyver: Lost Treasure of Atlantis is a 1994 American television film directed by Michael Vejar, based on a script written by Lee David Zlotoff and John Sheppard.

The film was shot in England and Greece.

== Cast ==
Actor	Role
Richard Dean Anderson	Angus MacGyver
Brian Blessed	Professor Atticus
Sophie Ward	Kelly Carson
Christian Burgess	Lord Cyril Cleeve
Oliver Ford Davies	Professor Carson
Tim Woodward	Colonel Petrovic
Kevork Malikyan	Zavros
Geoffrey Beevers	Academy Director
Hugh Quarshie	Chief Rhodes
George Jackos	Sergeant

== Plot ==
MacGyver and his former college archeology professor Atticus search for the Lost Treasure of Atlantis while at the same time shaking off unwanted competition.

== See also ==
- MacGyver (1985 TV series)
- MacGyver: Trail to Doomsday
