= Richard Dean Anderson =

American actor (born 1950)

- Anderson in 2026
- Born: January 23, 1950 (age 76); Minneapolis, Minnesota, U.S.
- Education: St. Cloud State University, Ohio University
- Occupations: Actor, producer
- Years active: 1976–present
- Partner(s): Apryl A. Prose (1996–2003)
- Children: 1
- Awards: Full list
- Website: rdanderson.com

Richard Dean Anderson (born January 23, 1950) is an American actor. He began his television career in 1976, playing Jeff Webber in the American soap opera series General Hospital, and then rose to prominence as the lead actor in the television series MacGyver (1985–1992). He later appeared in films such as Through the Eyes of a Killer (1992), Pandora's Clock (1996), and Firehouse (1997).

In 1997, Anderson returned to television as the lead actor of the series Stargate SG-1, a spin-off continuation of the 1994 film Stargate, replacing actor Kurt Russell. He played the lead from 1997 to 2005 and had a recurring role from 2005 to 2007. Since 1997, he has appeared in the follow-up Stargate spin-off series Stargate: Atlantis and Stargate: Universe, reprising his role from SG-1 as General Jack O'Neill.

== Early life ==
Anderson was born in Minneapolis, Minnesota, the eldest of four sons born to Stuart Jay Anderson, a teacher, and Jocelyn Rhae Carter, an artist. He is of Norwegian, Scottish, Finnish-Swedish, English, German, and Swedish descent. His last name, Anderson, derives from his Finnish-Swedish paternal grandfather from Munsala in Finland.

He grew up in Roseville, Minnesota, where he attended Alexander Ramsey High School. As a teenager, his dream of becoming a professional hockey player was ended when he broke both arms three weeks apart while playing hockey for the school team at the age of 18. According to Hockey Hall of Fame member Stan Mikita as of 2009, Anderson was "a hockey nut and pretty damn good hockey player." He developed an early interest in music, art, and acting. For a short time, he tried to become a jazz musician.

Anderson studied to become an actor at St. Cloud State University and then at Ohio University but dropped out before he received his degree because he felt "listless". Right after his junior year in college, he participated with friends in a cross-country bicycle ride from Minnesota to Alaska. He then moved to North Hollywood along with his friend and girlfriend before moving to New York City, finally settling in Los Angeles. He worked as a whale handler in a marine mammal show, as entertainment director at Marineland, a musician in medieval dinner theater, and as a street mime and juggler. He has stated that this period was "the happiest of [his] life" and has expressed an interest in teaching juggling, clowning, and other circus arts to disadvantaged youths.

== Career ==
=== Early career ===
Anderson's first screen role was The Birthday Party, a 1975 short film produced by the Marine Reserve Public Affairs Unit to mark the 200th anniversary of the founding of the United States Marine Corps. Shortly afterwards, Anderson joined the American soap opera, General Hospital as Dr. Jeff Webber from 1976 to 1981. Afterwards, Anderson guest-starred as one half of an interracial couple in an episode of The Facts of Life that also served as a backdoor pilot.

In 1982–1983 he starred as Adam in the CBS television series Seven Brides for Seven Brothers, based very loosely on the movie of the same name. In the 1983–1984 season, he played Lieutenant Simon Adams on the 22-week Dennis Weaver series Emerald Point N.A.S. on CBS, paired onscreen with Celia Warren (Susan Dey), the wife of naval lawyer Jack Warren (Charles Frank). Anderson then played Tony Kaiser in the acclaimed TV movie Ordinary Heroes, which aired in 1986.

==== MacGyver ====
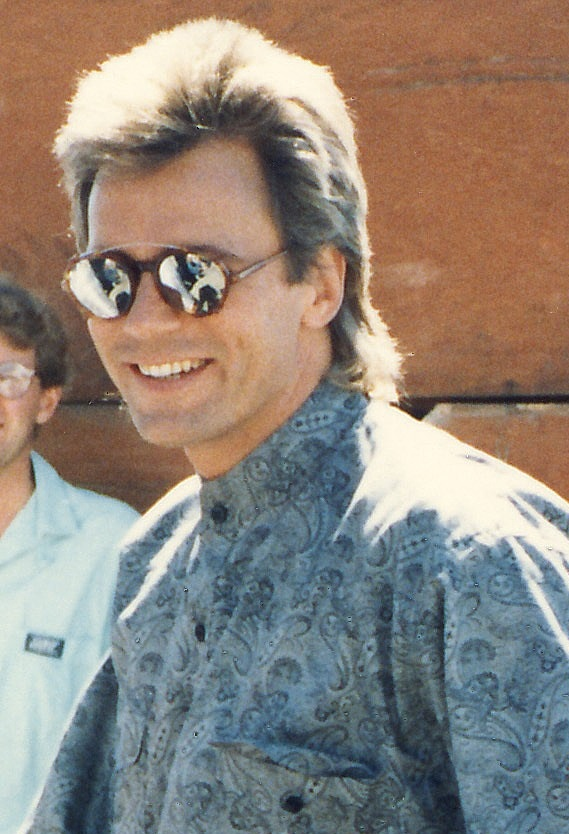
Anderson while on the set of MacGyver, filming the season 3, episode 3 ending "Back from the Dead", circa 1987

Anderson came to fame in the lead role of Angus MacGyver in the hit television series MacGyver, which lasted from 1985 to 1992 and was highly successful throughout its seven-year run. The character Angus MacGyver, also known as just MacGyver or Mac, was an optimistic action hero who was notable for using a Swiss Army knife instead of a firearm as his tool of choice. Anderson stated that he was initially drawn to the role because he "was intrigued by the idea of a TV hero who had an aversion to guns", noting his own aversion to violence and how the MacGyver character differed from popular action heroes of that time.

In 1994, Anderson produced two follow-up movies to MacGyver. After MacGyver ended, Anderson stated "MacGyver was seven years of being in virtually every frame that was shot and having absolutely no life at all."

During the run of MacGyver, Anderson suffered a number of injuries related to doing his own stunt work, some of which required surgery. He suffered a compressed disc in his back when he fell into a hole while filming an episode midway through the first season of the show. He continued filming in a "fairly crippled" state for a year and a half before having surgery that improved his condition, but still experienced pain from the incident. Anderson described it as an "exploded" disc that caused a "severe sciatic condition".

=== Later career ===
==== Stargate ====
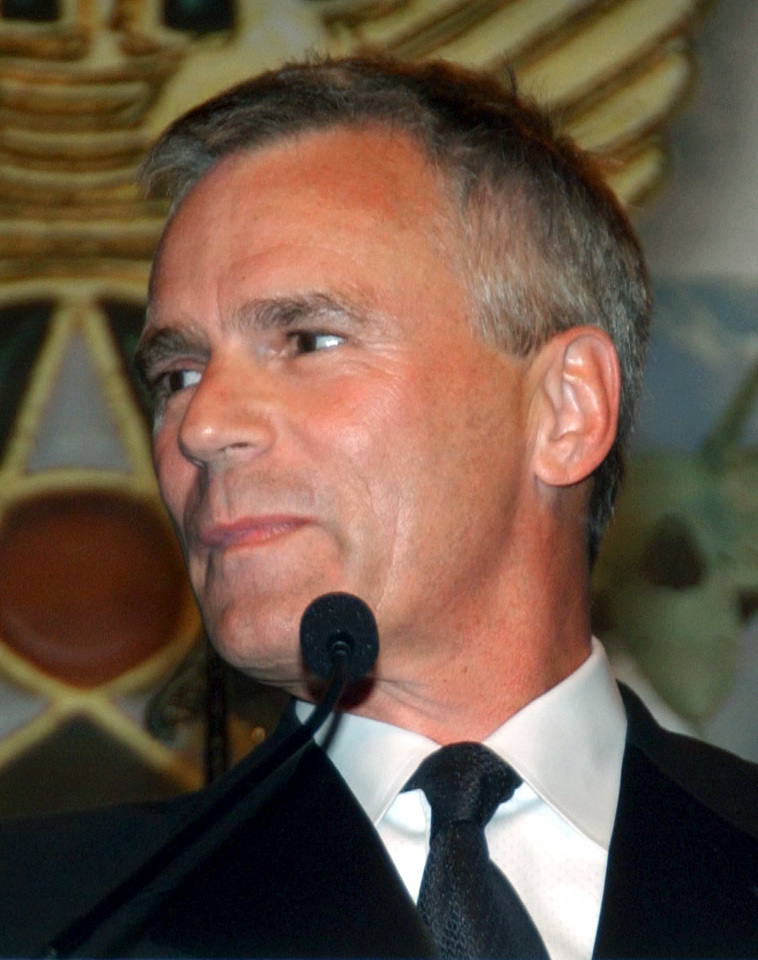
Anderson was recognized by the Air Force for his role in Stargate SG-1 and was made an honorary Air Force brigadier general

From 1997 to 2005, Anderson starred as Jack O'Neill in Stargate SG-1, based on the movie Stargate starring Kurt Russell and James Spader. John Symes, president of Metro–Goldwyn–Mayer (MGM), called Anderson himself and asked him if he wanted a part in the series. Anderson watched the Stargate film over and over again and came to the conclusion that the film had "great potential" and signed a contract with the Stargate producers.

Anderson agreed to become involved with the project if his character was allowed significantly more comedic leeway than Kurt Russell's character in the feature film. He also requested Stargate SG-1 be more of an ensemble show so that he would not be carrying the plot alone as he did on MacGyver. According to Anderson, he also would ad-lib "a lot of lines to bring a slightly sarcastic humor to the character".

In season eight, he chose to have his character "promoted" to base commander on Don S. Davis's advice. This enabled Davis to retire from acting due to his ailing health and Anderson to take over the smaller role which involved far less on-location shooting so that he could spend more time with his young daughter. The following season, Anderson terminated his status as star and producer of Stargate SG-1, opting to make several guest appearances per season instead, allowing his sizable role to be filled by veteran actors Ben Browder (replacing Anderson as field commander), Claudia Black (replacing Anderson as the comic relief) and Emmy nominee Beau Bridges (replacing Anderson as Base commander).

In September 2004, at the Air Force Association's 57th Annual Air Force Anniversary Dinner in Washington, D.C., then-Air Force Chief-of-Staff General John P. Jumper presented Anderson with an award for his role as star and executive producer of Stargate SG-1, a series which portrayed the Air Force in a positive light from its premiere. Anderson was also made an honorary Air Force brigadier general.

==== Other work ====
In 1995, he co-starred with John de Lancie in Legend, a comic series of only twelve episodes about a dime novel writer in the Wild West who, against his will, has to play the role of his own fictional character. Originally written as a TV movie, with the decision to make Legend a series, the original teleplay became the two-hour pilot episode. Anderson was applauded for his roles as Ernest Pratt and Nicodemus Legend by many critics, most notably John O'Connor from The New York Times.

A great fan of the television show The Simpsons, which he repeatedly referenced during his time on SG-1, Anderson was invited in 2005 to guest star on the show. He voiced himself in the episode "Kiss Kiss, Bang Bangalore", in which the actor was kidnapped by Selma and Patty Bouvier, Marge Simpson's sisters, his MacGyver character having been their longstanding heartthrob. Dan Castellaneta, the voice actor who portrays Homer Simpson (among other characters), made a guest appearance on Stargate SG-1 ("Citizen Joe") and, in describing his unnatural ability to see the life events of Jack O'Neill, made reference to O'Neill's fondness for The Simpsons.

Anderson briefly reprised his role as Angus MacGyver in 2006 when he appeared in a MasterCard commercial during Super Bowl XL. While the plot follows the "MacGyver Formula", it is somewhat satirical of the series, showing unlikely if not impossible solutions to the obstacles faced by Anderson's character. In one shot, he cuts through a thick rope with a pine-scented air freshener. The official MasterCard website for the commercial refers to it as "the Return of MacGyver".

Lee David Zlotoff, the creator of MacGyver, announced on May 3, 2008, that a MacGyver film was in production. Anderson expressed interest in revisiting his role; however, the film has not been made or released.

Anderson cameoed as MacGyver in what seemed to be a Saturday Night Live advertisement parody featuring the show's recurring character MacGruber, portrayed by Will Forte, but was rather a real commercial for both Saturday Night Live and Pepsi, in which the titular character becomes obsessed with the soft drink. This aired three times during the January 31, 2009, SNL broadcast, and the second part aired again during Super Bowl XLIII on the following day.

Anderson has also played the role of General Jack O'Neill in Stargate Atlantis and Stargate Universe, which first aired in October 2009.

Anderson joined the cast of Fairly Legal on USA Network in fall 2010 in the recurring role of David Smith, appearing in three episodes.

=== Other creative works ===
Anderson has served as an executive producer in six shows in which he himself has acted: MacGyver: Lost Treasure of Atlantis, MacGyver: Trail to Doomsday, Legend, Stargate SG-1, Firehouse and From Stargate to Atlantis: Sci Fi Lowdown.

Anderson composed the song "Eau d'Leo" for the MacGyver episode "The Negotiator".

Together with Michael Greenburg, Anderson created the Gekko Film Corporation. The company was involved with Stargate SG-1, producing every episode from 1997 to 2007 with the exception of 2006. The company itself has served as Anderson's backing agency.

== Charity work ==
Anderson has supported Waterkeeper Alliance, an organization trying to stop water pollution.

Anderson is a member of the Board of Trustees for Challengers Boys and Girls Club, a youth organization established in 1968 with the help of MacGyver producer Stephen Downing, and featured in an episode from season 4 of the show.

Anderson received the 1995 Celebrity Award from the Make-a-Wish Foundation because of his commitment to the foundation. He is also a supporter for various Sclerosis Society non-profit organizations and has done several public service announcements to show his support for the various organizations.

Anderson is an avid supporter of the Special Olympics and was one of many speakers at the 1991 opening ceremonies.

In recent years, Anderson has helped several environmental organizations around the world. He is a member of Board of Advisors of the Sea Shepherd Conservation Society and has worked with the members of the Earth Rivers Expeditions to Produce River Project.

== Personal life ==
Anderson divides his time among Vancouver, Los Angeles and northern Minnesota. A self-described "winter sports fanatic," he loves hockey and skiing. In 1998, he noted that he "had to slow it down a little bit" due to having "a couple of reconstructed knees." During filming of SG-1, he orchestrated both street and ice hockey games consisting of cast and crew. He was also a race car driver during the MacGyver years.

From 1996 to 2003, his partner was Apryl A. Prose, mother of his only child, Wylie Quinn Annarose Anderson, born on August 2, 1998. Anderson left Stargate SG-1 because he wanted to spend more time with his daughter, stating, "Being a father, well, I don't know if this is a change, but it makes me want to get out of here faster. Get off the clock. Just 'cause the baby is my reason for living, my reason for coming to work."

== Filmography ==
=== Television ===
Year	Series	Role	Notes
1976–1981	General Hospital	Dr. Jeff Webber	611 episodes
1981	The Facts of Life	Brian Parker	Episode: "Brian and Sylvia"
1981	Today's F.B.I.	Andy McFey	Episode: "The Fugitive"
1982	The Love Boat	Carter Randall	Episode: "Isaac Gets Physical/She Brougher Her Mother Along/Cold Feet"
1982–1983	Seven Brides for Seven Brothers	Adam McFadden	22 episodes
1983–1984	Emerald Point N.A.S.	Lt. Simon Adams	22 episodes
1985–1992	MacGyver	Angus MacGyver	139 episodes
1991	The Tonight Show Starring Johnny Carson		
1995	Legend	Ernest Pratt/Nicodemus Legend	12 episodes
1996	Pandora's Clock	Capt. James Holland	2 episodes
1997–2007	Stargate SG-1	Jack O'Neill	173 episodes
2004–2006	Stargate Atlantis	Jack O'Neill	4 episodes
2006	The Simpsons	Himself	Episode: "Kiss Kiss, Bang Bangalore"
2009	Saturday Night Live	MacGyver	2 episodes
2009–2010	Stargate Universe	Jack O'Neill	6 episodes
2011	Fairly Legal	David Smith	4 episodes
2011	Raising Hope	Keith	Episode: "Jimmy and the Kid"
2012	Mercedes Benz: MacGyver and the New Citan	Angus MacGyver	2 episodes
2013	Don't Trust the B— in Apartment 23	Himself	1 episode

=== Films ===
Year	Title	Role	Notes
1975	The Birthday Party	Korean War Marine	Public Information Film
1982	Young Doctors in Love	Drug Dealer	uncredited
1986	Odd Jobs	Spud	
1986	Ordinary Heroes	Tony Kaiser	TV movie
1992	Through the Eyes of a Killer	Ray Bellano	TV movie
1992	In the Eyes of a Stranger	Jack Rourke	TV movie
1994	MacGyver: Lost Treasure of Atlantis	Angus MacGyver	TV movie
1994	MacGyver: Trail to Doomsday	Angus MacGyver	TV movie
1994	Beyond Betrayal	Bradley Matthews	TV movie
1995	Past the Bleachers	Bill Parish	TV movie
1997	Firehouse	Lt. Michael Brooks	TV movie
2008	Stargate: Continuum	Jack O'Neill	

=== Video games ===
Year	Title	Role	Notes
1997	Fallout: A Post-Nuclear Role Playing Game	Killian Darkwater	Voice Actor
2013	Stargate SG-1: Unleashed	Jack O'Neill	Voice Actor

=== Producer ===
Year	Title	Role	Notes
1994	MacGyver: Lost Treasure of Atlantis	Executive Producer	TV
1994	MacGyver: Trail to Doomsday	Executive Producer	TV
1997	Stargate SG-1	Executive Producer	TV
1997	Firehouse	Executive Producer	TV
2004	From Stargate to Atlantis: Sci Fi Lowdown	Executive Producer	TV

=== Composer ===
Year	Title	Notes
1988	MacGyver	TV series (song "Eau d'Leo" in episode "The Negotiator")
