= MacGyver: Trail to Doomsday =

American TV movie

- Written by: Lee David Zlotoff, John Considine
- Directed by: Charles Correll
- Starring: Richard Dean Anderson; Beatie Edney; Peter Egan
- Music by: Ken Harrison
- Country of origin: United States
- Original language: English

Production
- Producers: Richard Dean Anderson; Henry Winkler; John Rich
- Cinematography: David Geddes
- Editor: Ron Binkowski
- Running time: 93 minutes

Original release
- Release: November 24, 1994

MacGyver: Trail to Doomsday is a 1994 American television film directed by Charles Correll, created by Lee David Zlotoff and based on a script written by John Considine. Production took place in London.

== Cast ==
Actor	Role
Richard Dean Anderson	Angus MacGyver
Beatie Edney	Natalia
Peter Egan	Frederick
Alun Armstrong	Capshaw
Bob Sherman	Anthony Graves
Lena Headey	Elise Moran
Michael Cronin	Dr. Massey
Jack Ellis	Joseph
Nicholas Farrell	Paul Moran
Robert Gwilym	Nikolai
Gabe Cronnelly	Policeman
Nicholas Hutchison	Jenkins
Richard James	lab-technician
Vincent Keane	Claude
Rocky Taylor	Plato

== Plot ==
MacGyver is in London visiting his friend Paul Moran. When Moran is murdered, MacGyver discovers a secret nuclear weapons factory right in the center of Britain.

== See also ==
- MacGyver (1985 TV series)
- MacGyver: Lost Treasure of Atlantis
