= Stephanie Calman =

British writer

Stephanie Calman is the author of six books, Confessions of a Bad Mother, Confessions of a Failed Grown-Up, How (Not) to Murder Your Mother, How (Not) to Murder Your Husband, Dressing for Breakfast and Gentleman Prefer My Sister.

In addition to being an author she created the Channel 4 sitcom Dressing for Breakfast and has appeared on TV shows such as Have I Got News for You and The Wright Stuff.

The daughter of the cartoonist Mel Calman, she is married with two children.
