= Law & Order: Organized Crime season 5 =

Season of American television series

Law & Order: Organized Crime
- Season 5
- Showrunners: John Shiban; Matt Olmstead
- Starring: Christopher Meloni; Danielle Moné Truitt; Ainsley Seiger; Rick Gonzalez; Dean Norris
- No. of episodes: 10

Release
- Original network: NBC/Peacock
- Original release: April 17 (NBC/Peacock); September 25, 2025 (NBC) – June 12, 2025 (Peacock); November 27, 2025 (NBC)

Season chronology
- ← Previous; Season 4

The fifth and final season of the American police drama Law & Order: Organized Crime aired its first two episodes on April 17, 2025. The first two episodes would air on Peacock, while its first episode would also have a special airing on NBC. The remaining eight episodes aired on Peacock. In Canada this season airs on Citytv, and streams on the Citytv+ website service, which is also accessible via Amazon Prime Video. In April 2026, the series was canceled after five seasons.

== Cast and characters ==
=== Main ===
- Christopher Meloni as Senior Detective Elliot Stabler
- Danielle Moné Truitt as Sergeant Ayanna Bell
- Ainsley Seiger as Detective 2nd Grade Jet Slootmaekers; (Episodes 1–3)
- Rick Gonzalez as Detective 2nd Grade Bobby Reyes
- Dean Norris as Randall Stabler

=== Recurring ===
- Tate Ellington as Professor Kyle Vargas
- Autumn Mirassou as Maureen "Mau" Stabler
- Allison Siko as Kathleen Stabler
- Nicky Torchia as Elliot "Eli" Stabler Jr.
- Kiaya Scott as Becky
- Michael Trotter as Joseph "Joe" Stabler, Jr.
- Garland Scott as Sergeant Hunt
- Tom Payne as Julian Emery

=== Crossover stars from Law & Order: Special Victims Unit ===
- Mariska Hargitay as Captain Olivia Benson
- Peter Scanavino as Assistant District Attorney Dominick "Sonny" Carisi, Jr.
- Tamara Tunie as M.E. Dr. Melinda Warner

=== Special guest stars ===
- Ellen Burstyn as Bernadette "Bernie" Stabler
- Jason Patric as Detective Tim McKenna

=== Guest stars ===
- Joseph Lee as A-Seong Gan
- Mary Elizabeth Mastrantonio as Isabella Spezzano
- Alberto Frezza as Roman Spezzano
- Anthony Skordi as Rocco Spezzano
- Olivia Thirlby as Detective Frances Tanner

== Episodes ==
No. overall	No. in season	Title	Directed by	Written by	Original release date	NBC air date	Prod. code
66	1	"Lost Highway"	Michael Slovis	John Shiban & Amy Berg	April 17, 2025	September 25, 2025	501
Les Coyotes Enragé (Mad Coyotes) biker gang leader Andre Lebec and Vic Kingman burn a cop's corpse. Mark Kingman hires Elliot, undercover as Hank, at 3 Kings Haulage, which trafficks women, underage girls and drugs across the Canadian border. FBI liaison, Special Agent Bruce Sheppard adds, they also smuggle weapons. His tech explains they drive a protected route through the Akwesasne Reservation. Confronted while raping Pebbles, Felix draws a knife, Elliot hits with a bat, but Vic levels a shotgun. Noticing "something's off", Bell learns Sheppard's prior C.I. was killed. Lug Nut radios, in code, "jonesing", selecting a hooker from Vic's photos. Lebec kills Felix for being "messy". Bunny reports Sad Eyes (Luisa Diaz's alias) missing; Elliot finds her photo in Lug Nut's rig and alerts Bell. Luisa is revealed to be in a semi-trailer with another girl's frozen corpse. Vargas correlates thirty-six unsolved female murders along I-90. Cricket alerts Elliot that Bunny is missing; last seen with Steve Kingman, who runs their motel. After Elliot pummels Mark and threatens Steve, Elliot rescues Bunny, beating the trucker, "Teddy Bear", but Vic slams his semi into Elliot's pickup. Meanwhile, Randall looks after Bernadette, and Eli meets his police FTO.
67	2	"Dante's Inferno"	Jean de Segonzac	Christopher Meloni & John Shiban	April 17, 2025	October 2, 2025	502
Doctors and nurses treat Elliot; he dreams, calling, "Liv!" as Captain Olivia Benson hears his prognosis. Bell and Sheppard arrive in force, arresting Mark and Steve. Reyes and Slootmaekers cannot prevent Vic's suicide. Elliot wakes; Olivia informs that Bunny survived. Sedated, Elliot hears Bunny asking, "Are you gonna save Sad Eyes?" Elsewhere, Lug Nut sells Sad Eyes to Sloppy Joe. Still at the hospital, Elliot, as "Hank", questions trucker Theodore "Teddy Bear" Bharinger regarding Sad Eyes. Teddy replies, "that sounds like a Lugs thing," and Elliot surmises a "kill club" network of serial killers that sell females to other truckers. After updating Reyes, Elliot passes out, hearing the doctor say that Bunny was in a coma before being taken off life support. Olivia confirms, she died before he saw her. Pressured, Steve talks. At a trucker swapmeet for drugs and females, Jet poses as a hooker to find Lugs. Bobby loses sight of Jet, who fights off Lugs strangling her. Bobby apprehends Lugs, who directs them to Sloppy Joe's "work shop" where he fires a nailgun; Jet and Elliot shoot him dead, freeing Luisa. Elliot realizes he is hit. After the traumatic encounter, Jet takes time off.
68	3	"Paranza Dei Bambini"	Laura Belsey	Liz Sagal & Davon Briggs	April 24, 2025	October 9, 2025	503
After events in "The Last Supper" ADA Dominick "Sonny" Carisi, Jr. informs Elliot that Bryanna Pescador recanted her statement against Carlo, who warns Elliot of a new player starting a full-scale war. Judge Hoff dismisses Carlo's case; the disguised bailiff shoots Carlo dead, and forces Elliot to kill him. Naples, Italy six years ago: Stabler arrests Isabella Spezzano, who stabbed her husband, calling the Camorra a cancer. For testimony against their new clan boss, her cousin Rocco, Stabler leverages her grandchildren, Gia, Pietro and Roman, who "belong with nonna". Presently: Elliot contacts his C.I., Isabella, who agrees to decode the shooter's Camorra calling card. A motorcyclist shoots Bryanna, but Kiki survives. They identify Jason Conti (the "bailiff"), and motorcyclist-assassin, Fernando Russo. After contacting Mrs. Russo, Fernando flees, killing himself. Elliot finds his Naples sketch, "The Piranha are here", meaning young Camorra foot soldiers. Bell checks on Jet, who created an "enhanced highway serial-killer database", now with 148 cases. Vargas finds Bryanna's $2-million deposit from a shell corporation in Afragola, which also funds Roman's new brewery. Considering an FBI position, Jet collects her office belongings. Another motorcyclist fires at Elliot, Eli, and Becky, who is eight-and-a-half months pregnant.
69	4	"Promesse Infrante"	Alex Zakrzewski	Amy Berg & Will Pascoe	May 1, 2025	October 16, 2025	504
After the shooting, Elliot's therapist recommends "conditional release". At Fernando's church memorial, Roman warns Elliot, "Take care...It's about to start." Interrogated, former altar boy David Bianchi explains, because of Father Antonio De Luca, and Fernando giving him a gun, they quit church, where Elliot confesses failing to save children who are "dying on the streets...being turned into killers", vowing to stop it. Surveilling, Rocco calls Elliot, "Someone who should be dead." Going undercover, a cashier introduces Angel Acosta, who jumps Reyes into Los Santos. At Gia's "twin-tuition", Isabella finds Pietro's revolver. Roman initiates Pietro into Camorra's piranhas, while Los Santos beats piranha Nico. Isabella reveals Antonio ran with the Camorra as a teenager. Los Santos ambushes Piranhas, killing Sal Conte; Bobby warns Pietro away. Elliot warns Eli against sharing their personal life, but Sergeant Hunt intervenes. Elliot confronts Isabella about Pietro's arrest warrant; in vain, she orders Roman to cut ties with the Camorra. Vargas investigates Rocco's prison visitors. Polizia report, Antonio is a POI in a political assassination. Reyes activates his tracker as Los Santos attacks Roman's brewery, where Stabler confronts Roman, who is shot. Unable to shoot Reyes, Pietro is shot dead by Eli as police arrive.
70	5	"Lago D'Averno"	Michael Slovis	John Shiban & Liz Sagal	May 8, 2025	October 23, 2025	505
While Becky's "preemie" son is born, Hunt advises Eli about IA interrogation; Moses Warren sends Eli for psychological evaluation. Vargas hacks cameras, confirming Rocco escaped prison. Elliot survives his Tahoe exploding. Isabella realizes her sister Lucia is here after Antonio brings Roman, who admits joining Camorra as protection against Rocco. Via JPL's "Ronnie" CubeSat, Vargas surveils Our Lady of the Cross to track the car-bomber. Reyes questions Sister Superior Mary Leo-Gene, aka Lucia, who reports to Rocco and tortures Antonio for Roman's whereabouts. Stabler tells Warner to investigate Hunt instead of Eli. After Ronnie shows "Mary" entering a shielded room, Bell finds Antonio dead. Elliot alerts Isabella's family. Gia shoots Rocco's henchman while Lucia severs Isabella's right pinky. Elliot intervenes, handing Isabella a shotgun to detain Lucia while he searches for Rocco. Gia is unable to shoot Rocco, so Roman does. Hearing Isabella's shotgun, Elliot finds a woman with her face blown off, dressed in Isabella's clothing. Elliot checks with M.E. Dr. Melinda Warner regarding Isabella, but finds the corpse's pinky unsevered, indicating it is really Lucia, telling Melinda, "Never mind." Meanwhile, Randall enlists Kyle, who confirms Joey was calling Bernadette from Europe.
71	6	"Red, White, Black and Blue"	Eriq La Salle	Tim Walsh	May 15, 2025	October 30, 2025	506
Masked narcotics officers abduct, bind, and photograph Lucero. ADA Anne Frasier and Detective Tommy Da Silva demand that Sinaloan drug lord Miguel "El Diablo" Olivas confess his crimes or his girlfriend will be indicted. Salvadoran gunmen arrive; after arguing, Olivas shoots Tommy and beats Anne to death. Three more officers are killed. Chief of Detectives Gordon Saubert subtly hints at Elliot, "do what needs to be done." Officer Berkowitz drills, "Where is he?", but Reyes takes over questioning Lucero. Believing he was "dirty", Detective Tim McKenna asks Tommy's wife Mary about "side jobs", angering her. McKenna gets "creative", threatening to call Mexican Federales to kill Lucero's family. She labels him, "The killer cop...who murdered Miguel's family!" Bell intervenes, "This is my house." Privately, Lucero tells Reyes, Olivas is headed to Brewster. In the subway, Olivas takes a hostage and evades them. Bell learns the DEA sealed McKenna's file. Elliot confronts, "Did you kill Olivas's family?" McKenna qualifies that he fed information that got them killed. Reyes suspects a mole in his El Dorado task force. Pressured, Mary reveals Tommy met guys in Staten Island. Demente leads them to a stash house, where Elliot finds Olivas, shot, and detains him.
72	7	"Beautiful Disaster"	Yangzom Brauen	Amy Berg & Katrina Cabrera Ortega	May 22, 2025	November 6, 2025	507
After Zipp Chow's robot projects "corporate greed" art protest messages, A-Seong Gan congratulates Skye Johnson, furtively signaling Max to detonate it, killing Tyler Pearson. While A-Seong's mother lay hospitalized, Skye protests Pearson's death; he deflects, "a happy accident." Counterterrorism Bureau Detective Frances Tanner detains Vargas, whose code "fingerprint" was used, but she sees the Collective's signature style in other cities' demonstrations. Zipp Chow's robot tech reveals outside hackers, and "Oh My Darling, Clementine" played before the explosion. A-Seong compliments Kendra's coding; Max criticizes his drug use, eliciting anger. A 1NYC reporter announces "electric vehicle outage causing gridlock." Max accelerates Gemma Powell's car, killing her assistant Julia Ortiz, and hospitalizing Gemma, who heard the same song. In vain, Skye warns A-Seong to stop. Vargas discovers a "6088" motif that Tanner calls, "an homage to Basquiat." Vargas finds Skye, who claims her art was stolen. Later, Skye quits A-Seong, telling Tanner, "I'm ready to talk." Having eavesdropped, A-Seong plays his mother's video-song and starts a fire that kills Skye. Meanwhile, Elliot discovers Erik working with Randall. Becky worries about Eli's drinking. Elliot warns Hunt, "get between me and my kid again, I'll kick the living shit out of you." Joey visits Bernadette.
73	8	"Fail Safe"	Jean de Segonzac	Will Pascoe & John Shiban	May 29, 2025	November 13, 2025	508
Dr. Arden Stokol concludes, no further treatment is justified. A-Seong accuses, "you're justifying murder...it won't go unanswered." Landlady Yulia lets Tanner and Stabler into Skye's apartment, discovering her association with Pearson and Powell – The Society for Resistant Art. Vargas correlates members, identifying Zip Chow robotics engineer Max Sherman, tracing him to A-Seong's Maru karaoke bar. They call Bomb Squad Captain Sean Pierce, detaining A-Seong, who says Pearson "sold out" to NFT, quoting Honoré de Balzac, "Behind every fortune lies a great crime." Powell had rejected his art. Tanner accuses, he burned Skye after rejection. Vargas discovers username Balzac6088 downloaded his code. An explosion kills Stokol; Tanner notes, Gan smiled at the same time. Vargas discovers Nari Choi, A-Seong's mother who owns Naru, died, revealing motive. Tanner is lured away. A runner discovers Tanner bound atop a bomb with cellphone activation, and computerized countermeasures, which Vargas counter-codes to defeat. Elliot approaches for a visual. A-Seong waits for maximum media coverage, but Vargas blocks Max's signals, giving Elliot the password to deactivate it. They arrest A-Seong and his Collective. Meanwhile, Bernadette survives surgery. Joe Jr. calls, "No matter what happens...soon now, Elliot, know that I love you. I made my own choices."
74	9	"Off the Books"	Cory Bowles	Teleplay by : Liz Sagal & Davon Briggs; Story by : Matt Olmstead	June 5, 2025	November 20, 2025	509
Julian Emery kills Manuel Chavez, who failed him. Joe surreptitiously leaves foil with Boone's one-eyed skull, but the lab tech cannot find heroin. Tanner says CTB tagged it as a Syrian governmental psychoactive stimulant, Captagon, which funds terrorism. Elliot reveals Joe as his "off the books" C.I., who reveals a meeting with Turkish distributor Sadat Majid, but Julian is listening. They raid, confiscating five kilos, but Majid does not know Emery. Tanner believes they took out Emery's competition, suggesting Joe lied. Joe claims that Julian was "spooked" away, but Emery is moving $300-million in Captagon at Miller Airfield, Staten Island. Elliot gives him a pendant, "from mom". Julian discovers its tracker after henchman Vincent notices an inbound "cop caravan". Raiding the warehouse, Julian uses Joe as a shield to escape. Elliot chases. Vargas sends backup. Julian demands Elliot revoke his APB, or he will kill Joe. Hearing helicopters, Julian shoots Joe, who, dying, says, "I mailed it, El." Captain Mason says, "need to do this by the book." Tanner takes over, as Elliot informs his family. McKenna reveals "Emery's muscle", Vincent. "We can take him in. Or we can go for a ride." Elliot replies, "Let's go for a ride."
75	10	"He Was a Stabler"	Peter Stebbings	Teleplay by : Edgar Castillo; Story by : Matt Olmstead & Edgar Castillo	June 12, 2025	November 27, 2025	510
With fire extinguisher nearby, Elliot spays lighter fluid on Vincent Mathis and lights a match. "Julian Emery...Tell us where he is." Tanner declares tons of Captagon are inbound; Command wants Emery alive. Investigating real estate bought by Pastorious Global Partners, who paid Emery as broker, Reyes identifies construction supplier Tony Yared. Stabler and McKenna rough him up to list properties Emery might use. Randall supplies Joey's mailed thumbdrive, and secures their family at Montauk, where Bernadette unboxes Joe's NYPD application. Reyes finds an address, but Emery is gone. From his SIM-card, McKenna finds ex-wife Allegra Northcott, who calls Julian. Stabler bluffs Allegra's arrest, and Giles's foster care, but Julian is unmoved. Vargas triangulates the call, finding plate numbers. Stabler gives OCCB Emery's destination. Raiding it, Stabler follows Emery, as does Bell. They take him alive. Faced with Guantanamo, Emery names Hezbollah's top leaders. Wanting bigger fish, FBI ASAC Ed Guthrie says, "You're done here." Furious, Elliot shouts "He killed my brother!" Vargas restores Joe's thumbdrive containing six months of damning evidence against Emery. Stabler concludes, "We got him." Emery belittles Joe, but Elliot retorts, "He was a Stabler" who assured Emery's imprisonment for the rest of his life. Series epilogue: On bereavement leave, Elliot takes Bernadette and family to see Joe's NYPD Memorial Plaque for his sacrifice in service as a Confidential Informant, remarking on his dedication, courage, and efforts to save countless lives.
