= Law & Order: Organized Crime season 2 =

Season of American television series

Law & Order: Organized Crime
- Season 2
- Showrunners: Ilene Chaiken; Barry O'Brien
- Starring: Christopher Meloni; Danielle Moné Truitt; Tamara Taylor; Ainsley Seiger; Dylan McDermott; Nona Parker Johnson
- No. of episodes: 22

Release
- Original network: NBC
- Original release: September 23, 2021 – May 19, 2022

Season chronology
- ← Previous; Season 1 Next → Season 3

The second season of Law & Order: Organized Crime premiered on September 23, 2021, on NBC and consisted of 22 episodes. The season finale aired on May 19, 2022. Tamara Taylor and Dylan McDermott depart the show after episode 14. Nona Parker Johnson joins the cast and departs after the season finale.

== Cast and characters ==
=== Main ===
- Christopher Meloni as Senior Detective Elliot Stabler
- Danielle Moné Truitt as Sergeant Ayanna Bell
- Tamara Taylor as Professor Angela Wheatley (episodes 1, 9–14)
- Ainsley Seiger as Junior Detective Jet Slootmaekers
- Dylan McDermott as Richard Wheatley (episodes 1, 9–14)
- Nona Parker Johnson as Detective Carmen "Nova" Riley

=== Crossover stars from Law & Order: Special Victims Unit ===
- Mariska Hargitay as Captain Olivia Benson
- Ice-T as Sergeant Fin Tutuola
- Raúl Esparza as Defense Attorney (former ADA) Rafael Barba
- Dann Florek as Former Captain Donald Cragen
- Octavio Pisano as Detective Joe Velasco

=== Special guest stars ===
- Dash Mihok as Reggie Bogdani
- Vinnie Jones as Albi Briscu
- Michael Raymond-James as Jon Kosta
- Guillermo Diaz as Sergeant/Lieutenant Bill Brewster
- Ellen Burstyn as Bernadette Stabler
- Mykelti Williamson as Preston Webb
- Denis Leary as Detective Frank Donnelly
- Jennifer Beals as Cassandra Webb
- Ron Cephas Jones as Congressman Leon Kilbride

=== Recurring ===
- Mike Cannon as Detective 3rd Grade Carlos Maldonado
- Rachel Lin as Detective 1st Grade Victoria Cho
- Lolita Davidovich as Flutura Briscu
- Antino Crowley-Kamenwati as Hugo Bankole
- Izabela Vidovic as Rita Lasku
- Caroline Lagerfelt as Agniezjka "Agnes" Bogdani
- Robin Lord Taylor as Sebastian "Constantine" McClane
- Gregg Henry as Edmund Ross
- Wesam Keesh as Adam "Malachi" Mintock
- James Cromwell as Miles Darman
- Liris Crosse as Officer Tanisha Carling
- Eddie Yu as Officer David Yoshida
- Justin Grace as Ron Bolton
- Sebastian Arroyo as Officer Jessie Santos
- Patrick Murney as Officer Scott Parnell,
- Tim Ransom as Officer Stanwood
- Autumn Mirassou as Maureen "Mau" Stabler
- Allison Siko as Kathleen Stabler
- Jeffrey Scaperrotta as Richard "Dickie" Stabler
- Kaitlyn Davidson as Elizabeth "Lizzie" Stabler
- Nicky Torchia as Elliot "Eli" Stabler Jr.

== Episodes ==
No. overall	No. in season	Title	Directed by	Written by	Original release date	Prod. code	U.S. viewers (millions)
9	1	"The Man with No Identity"	Bethany Rooney	Ilene Chaiken & Kimberly Ann Harrison	September 23, 2021	201	4.18
Stabler goes undercover as ex-con Eddie "Ashes" Wagner within the Albanian mob as they aim to take over New York City's cocaine trade. Elsewhere, Richard Wheatley has only one more hurdle to clear before he is released from prison, while Angela Wheatley recovers from Morales' poisoning attempt.
10	2	"New World Order"	Fred Berner	Nichole Beattie	September 30, 2021	202	4.12
The alliance between the Kosta and Marcy Killers mobs has them targeting the Italians for control of the drug and protection trades. When the Italians retaliate, Marcy member Nova's girlfriend is killed. Nova is later revealed to be Carmen Riley, an undercover working for Brewster in the Narcotics Task Force. Note: This episode continues a crossover event that begins on Law & Order: Special Victims Unit season 23 episode 3 and concludes on Law & Order: Organized Crime season 2 episode 3.
11	3	"The Outlaw Eddie Wagner"	John Polson	Eric Haywood	September 30, 2021	203	4.12
Stabler helps Kosta underboss Albi dispose of a body as a favor, then almost suffers the same fate when he learns a personal secret about Albi. Jet tracks down the hacker whom she suspects of installing multiple blockers on the phone that the Kostas issued to Stabler. Stabler is welcomed into a meeting with boss Jon Kosta as the episode closes. Note: This episode concludes a crossover event that begins on Law & Order: Special Victims Unit season 23 episode 3 and continues on Law & Order: Organized Crime season 2 episode 2.
12	4	"For a Few Lekë More"	Jean de Segonzac	Zachary Reiter	October 7, 2021	204	3.20
Stabler is required to stand up for himself with another Kosta member to keep his cover from getting blown and breaks the guy's nose, only to learn the guy is engaged to the boss' daughter. Albi is able to help Elliot avoid punishment, but the boss forces Stabler to take the injured member's place in a bar heist, resulting in Elliot having to shoot a man who pointed a gun at him. Meanwhile, the Organized Crime unit is able to publicly apprehend the man supplying encrypted phones to multiple crime groups, planning to have Jet's hacker captive supply new phones as part of his deal to avoid prosecution.
13	5	"The Good, The Bad, and The Lovely"	Terry Miller	Juliet Lashinsky-Revene	October 14, 2021	205	3.32
Having endeared himself to Flutura and found fake passports for several young Albanian women in her home, Elliot alerts SVU of likely human trafficking by the Kostas. He gets a job with Reggie working security at a high-end charity event that Flutura has set up. Bell attends as a guest of Congressman Kilbride while SVU sets up a sting. As SVU moves in upon getting Bell's proof of prostitution, Elliot helps Reggie and Flutura escape, then takes off to rescue Rita, a young woman he met when she was waitressing at an Albanian diner. Flutura alerts Albi and Kosta that they have a rat. Meanwhile, Elliot deals with his son acting out at home. Note: This episode concludes a crossover event that begins on Law & Order: Special Victims Unit season 23 episode 5 and continues on Law & Order: Organized Crime season 2 episode 5.
14	6	"Unforgivable"	Monica Raymund	Rick Marin	October 21, 2021	206	3.02
Elliot's cover is threatened when Eddie Wagner's 19-year old son, who hasn't seen his father since age 6, comes to town. Bell and Denise are awaiting a meeting with Congressman Kilbride concerning Denise's nephew when Bell sees Nova leaving Kilbride's office with an envelope of money. Reggie is tasked with assassinating a politician who called out the Kostas on television, but he kills the politician's wife instead.
15	7	"High Planes Grifter"	Alex Hall	Kimberly Ann Harrison	November 4, 2021	207	3.25
After arresting Reggie Bogdani, Bell and Brewster interrogate him to try to turn him against the family. Elliot reveals his true identity to Reggie, which angers him. Stabler testifies to a grand jury to get them to indict the members of the Kosta Organization. Stabler goes back undercover in the K-O only to find out that Jon Kosta wants Reggie dead; Stabler then plays audio of that to Reggie, which makes him turn against the family, testifying in front of the grand jury. However, Reggie's mother is able to get a message out to Albi. The grand jury issues indictments for members of the K-O, which leads to the NYPD raiding their diner and bars. Detective Vanessa Cho and a few NYPD officers raid Jon Kosta's home, only to find he's not there (just his daughter and her boyfriend) while Stabler and Bell raid the Briscus' home.
16	8	"Ashes to Ashes"	Jean de Segonzac	Kimberly Ann Harrison & Nichole Beattie	November 11, 2021	208	3.04
The team tracks Kosta and Albi to the boxing gym that fronts their business. The K-O blows up the building, killing the real Eddie Wagner's son, and escapes via tunnel. Kosta is caught first, trying to escape in an ambulance, then Albi is captured later despite Flutura trying to warn him off. The K-O is formally indicted, as is Agnes Bogdani for murdering a court reporter. Reggie Bogdani goes into witness protection. Bell meets with Carmen Riley ("Nova"), who has been promoted to vice president in the Marcy Killers. Riley confirms Congressman Kilbride was in the meeting where the decision was made, with Kilbride bragging that he's "developing a relationship" with someone in the organized crime unit (Bell).
17	9	"The Christmas Episode"	Fred Berner	Zachary Reiter & Rick Marin	December 9, 2021	209	3.50
Eli Stabler meets a woman at a New Jersey promenade and goes to an apartment with her, where they drink tequila and take his grandmother's opioids. He wakes up to find the woman dead and has to be talked down from a bridge by a New Jersey cop, as Elliot and Olivia Benson head to the scene. Jet learns that the woman was actually killed by a mob hitman, with the intention of framing Eli. When the hitman reveals he was paid in cyber currency that ties back to Richard Wheatley, Elliot confronts Wheatley in prison. Richard says the only person with the codes to his currency is his daughter, Dana. Elliot visits Angela Wheatley, who denies knowing where Dana is, but she's later shown hiding her daughter. Meanwhile, Rafael Barba says that the D.A.'s office doesn't have a strong enough case against Richard, so he is released from prison; for a second time, Barba rejects Wheatley's offer to become his consigliere. Note: This episode concludes a crossover event that begins on Law & Order: Special Victims Unit season 23 episode 9.
18	10	"Nemesis"	Jim McKay	Eric Haywood & Juliet Lashinsky-Revene	January 6, 2022	210	3.31
A cyber attack allows notorious hacker Sebastian McClane, known as "Constantine," to escape from prison. McClane engineered a hack on a government agency in Washington, DC that caused a security guard to be locked in a gold vault, wherein he suffocated to death. Wheatley is released from prison with the understanding that he will cooperate with the FBI. He privately vows to rebuild his criminal empire and is shown to be behind the scheme that freed McClane. McClane is brought to Wheatley's home so Richard can discuss his plans for him. Wheatley is asked to assist the Organized Crime Task Force with a current cyber attack. Elliot is certain Wheatley was behind the attack for the purposes of solving it and making himself appear to be fully cooperating with law enforcement. Elsewhere, Congressman Kilbride becomes embroiled in construction payola, which Riley reports to Ayanna.
19	11	"As Nottingham Was to Robin Hood"	Alex Hall	Kimberly Ann Harrison & Nichole Beattie	January 13, 2022	211	3.25
McClane refuses to work with Wheatley, saying he only had one reason to get out of prison, revealed when he digs up $200,000 in cash and tries to open a bank account for the daughter of the deceased security guard. McClane agrees to surrender to the FBI after he tells the guard's widow about the account. However, Wheatley's henchman impersonates an FBI agent and picks up McClane, returning him to Wheatley's home. Meanwhile, McClane's loyal followers start engineering computer glitches that cause chaos throughout the city. Wheatley taunts Elliot and scares his mother. Elliot locates Wheatley and says he will personally kill him and bury the body if Wheatley ever threatens his family again. Wheatley later helps New York Governor Teddy Garcia with a hack and warns Garcia that Elliot Stabler's obsession with him is making him a loose cannon.
20	12	"As Iago Is to Othello"	Fred Berner	Rick Marin	January 20, 2022	212	3.22
Elliot worries about a new man in his mother's life. Wheatley and a reluctant McClane are behind a hack of a federal financial system. It's revealed that Wheatley did it to disturb the markets and test the waters before doing something far more sinister later. The Organized Crime team surveils Wheatley's home and learns he is obsessed with not only reclaiming his fortune but also getting back together with Angela. Governor Garcia shares concerns over Stabler's mental state with Ayanna. Stabler invites Angela for a meal and puts on a show of affection, knowing Wheatley is watching. Wheatley attacks his ex-wife and McClane is powerless to stop it. McClane later tells Organized Crime that he is purposely leaving behind a digital footprint. Jet figures out a password to get at Wheatley's files, which turns out to be the date of Kathy Stabler's murder. Enraged, Elliot attacks Wheatley in an elevator. A bloodied Wheatley laughs and says he will always live in Stabler's head. Miles, the new man in Bernadette Stabler's life, is revealed to be working for Wheatley.
21	13	"As Hubris Is to Oedipus"	Stephen Surjik	Emmy Higgins & Zachary Reiter	February 24, 2022	213	3.48
Wheatley recaptures McClane and ties up both him and Angela. He forces McClane to gather his followers and get them to carry out Wheatley's sinister plans. Elliot goes undercover as one of McClane's followers and learns that the group will plant bombs in five symbolic areas of the city (e.g. financial, medical, judicial). The Organized Crime Task Force rescues McClane after Wheatley left him to die, having released and taken Angela. The Task Force learns the five bombs are a distraction for Wheatley's real target: he is taking over the main power plant and hacking its systems in order to hold the entire city hostage.
22	14	"...Wheatley Is to Stabler"	Sarah Boyd	Ilene Chaiken & Kimberly Ann Harrison	March 3, 2022	214	3.16
Wheatley shuts down power throughout the city and makes several demands, including the release of his son Richie, a flight to the Caribbean, and a meet with Elliot Stabler. As the Task Force and other law enforcement try to figure out how to access the power plant and capture Wheatley without causing more havoc, McClane helps Jet and Malachi activate an outdated backup plant to try and restore some power to New York. Wheatley murders Richie and gets Elliot to admit, on livestream, that he's shot ten citizens on duty, among other confessions. Wheatley finally tries to get Stabler to say he lied about Wheatley killing Kathy, which Elliot refuses to do but, by then, Jet and Malachi successfully restore power. Wheatley makes his escape to the airport with Angela driving, after revealing he kidnapped Elliot's mother. After locating Bernadette and removing Wheatley's threat, law enforcement tails his car. When Elliot informs her of Richie's murder, Angela steers the car over a cliff and into the river. Ayanna later confirms that they found Angela dead, but can't locate Wheatley's body.
23	15	"Takeover"	John Polson	Eric Haywood	March 10, 2022	215	3.11
Stabler is shown being suspended and surrendering his gun, then later arguing with Ayanna at 1PP about "not having my back," but it's soon revealed to be a ruse so that Stabler will be welcomed into a gang of dirty cops working for old colleague Frank Donnelly (Denis Leary). Stabler becomes involved in raiding a drug house with Donnelly, where the cops steal the drug money. Donnelly then has to backpedal when the drugs are revealed to be connected to the Marcy Killers. Stabler's suspicions are confirmed: Donnelly's gang of cops have an understanding with the Marcy Killers. Meanwhile, Nova's position within the Marcy Killers is elevated even further, as Webb's other VPs now report to her. It's revealed that Nova has a brother, a Baptist minister, who does not know she is a cop. Webb and his wife attend a church service there and see Nova hugging her brother.
24	16	"Guns & Roses"	Jean de Segonzac	Juliet Lashinsky-Revene	March 17, 2022	216	3.43
A lawyer and the sex worker she's trying to help are both gunned down. Hugo, a VP in the Marcy Killers, had tried to warn off the lawyer. Ayanna puts Hugo on the suspect list, but Nova insists he wasn't the shooter. Stabler is assigned to Donnelly's precinct. Precinct Captain Darnell is not happy to have Stabler and puts him on desk duty. However, Donnelly takes Stabler out for the night to raid a meth lab. The lab workers are tipped off and leave with the drugs, but Donnelly's crew finds a stash of guns they can sell. A lone crook who stayed behind shoots at Stabler, but Donnelly jumps in front and takes the bullet to his vest. Captain Darnell is angry that Stabler went out with active cops and says he plans to get him fired. Donnelly puts a cop named Van Aller in charge of selling the guns and Elliott learns Van Aller is behind the sex worker shooting. Van Aller confesses to Stabler that IAB will soon be all over him. While Elliott goes into a bar for a drink, Van Aller shoots and kills himself. In front of Nova, Hugo is disciplined by Webb for trying to protect the lawyer, whom he says is an old friend. Darnell says "someone high up" would not let him fire Stabler and gives Stabler his gun while warning him about the same higher-ups.
25	17	"Can't Knock the Hustle"	Jonathan Brown	Kimberly Ann Harrison & Emmy Higgins	April 7, 2022	217	2.98
A new ADA urges the task force to flip a member of the Brotherhood. Stabler questions how his father got the Combat Cross. Elliot and Santos work on switching diamonds on a millionaire, when Donnelly shows up unexpectedly. Donnelly pretends to be the millionaire's driver and kills him when he wants to go to the police. Santos gets arrested in front of his house for his actions with the Brotherhood. Elliot visits Cragen to question him about his father.
26	18	"Change the Game"	John Polson	Rick Marin	April 14, 2022	218	3.15
Donnelly and his wife host a baby shower and the Brotherhood question Donnelly about Stabler. Stabler and Donnelly work with Webb to find a missing case of artwork filled with illegal weapons. Stabler tries to convince Santos to flip on the Brotherhood. Donnelly bails when he and Stabler have to get the guns from the warehouse. When Stabler goes to check on Donnelly, his wife goes into labor and Stabler has to drive her to the hospital. Stabler delivers the guns back to Webb, getting into Webb's good graces. Stabler looks at old family videos.
27	19	"Dead Presidents"	Rob J. Greenlea	Zachary Reiter	April 28, 2022	219	3.18
Stabler and Donnelly are rehired by Webb to find out who stole millions in cash from him. Webb thinks the money is in Rutger Ulrich's house, so Stabler hires Malachi to break into the safe. Stabler, Donnelly, and Malachi find nothing in the safe. The investigation continues when a rental van that stole the money is put under Stabler's name. Derrick Riley (Carmen/Nova's brother) buys a gun to kill Preston Webb. Ayanna's wife looks to take a job from Congressman Kilbride. Stabler also questions his father's old partner on what happened when his father got the Combat Cross.
28	20	"Lost One"	Cherie Nowlan	Juliet Lashinsky-Revene	May 5, 2022	220	4.08
Stabler must team up with Benson and the SVU after Santo's daughter gets kidnapped. Bell and her unit investigate Preston Webb while Stabler asks the Brotherhood. Donnelly drops money off to Santo's wife to help pay for the ransom. Stabler finds out that Donnelly named his baby after him. Stabler and Benson find Santo's daughter across the street from a museum in Queens. Stabler finds out the money Donnelly brought to Santo's wife's house has the same serial numbers as the money that was robbed from Webb. Note: This episode concludes a crossover event that begins on Law & Order: Special Victims Unit season 23 episode 20.
29	21	"Streets Is Watching"	Sharon Lewis	Erica Michelle Butler	May 12, 2022	221	3.16
Stabler and Bell find out from Nova that a bounty was put out on Stabler through the Marcy Killers. Stabler questions Donnelly about the rental van being put in his name. Stabler gets shot outside his apartment and finds out that the assassin is a very skilled woman. Donnelly announces he is leaving the Brotherhood and passing the group over to Stabler. Later, Stabler chases the assassin, but loses her. Derrick tries to kill Webb, but Nova shoots him in the leg. Stabler is able to take down the assassin when she tries to go for him again in his own apartment. Stabler finds out that his father was crooked and that it was his partner who shot him.
30	22	"Friend or Foe"	Ken Girotti	Rick Marin & Barry O'Brien	May 19, 2022	222	3.37
Stabler visits Hansen, who in turn calls Donnelly to tell him that Stabler is undercover. Donnelly then puts a hit out on Stabler. Meanwhile, Preston Webb has gone missing and Cassandra is worried. Donnelly tells Stabler he knows where Webb is, but it's a setup where Stabler gets shot during a shootout. He is saved by a bulletproof vest. Meanwhile, the task force arrests Congressman Kilbride, but Denise gets mad at Ayanna for doing so. Stabler starts taking down all of the Brotherhood one by one because they think he is dead. He rounds up everyone except for Donnelly. Preston Webb is found dead in the Gowanus Canal and Donnelly is off the radar. Cassandra gets arrested after the task force finds out she was the one who put the hit out on Stabler. Meanwhile, Stabler finds Donnelly and chases him throughout the city. They stop at a train track where Donnelly commits suicide instead of getting arrested. Ayanna finds out that Denise left her after the Kilbride incident. Stabler apologizes to the father of a kid who was shot by his father, the act that got his father the Cross. Stabler gets the Combat Cross while surrounded by friends and family. Nova and Derrick leave New York when they find out that Preston Webb is dead.

== Ratings ==
Viewership and ratings per episode of Law & Order: Organized Crime season 2
No.	Title	Air date	Rating (18–49)	Viewers (millions)	DVR (18–49)	DVR viewers (millions)	Total (18–49)	Total viewers (millions)
1	"The Man with No Identity"	September 23, 2021	0.6	4.18	—N/a	—N/a	—N/a	—N/a
2	"New World Order"	September 30, 2021	0.7	4.12	—N/a	—N/a	—N/a	—N/a
3	"The Outlaw Eddie Wagner"	September 30, 2021	0.7	4.12	—N/a	—N/a	—N/a	—N/a
4	"For a Few Lekë More"	October 7, 2021	0.6	3.20	—N/a	—N/a	—N/a	—N/a
5	"The Good, The Bad, and The Lovely"	October 14, 2021	0.6	3.32	0.5	2.11	1.0	5.43
6	"Unforgivable"	October 21, 2021	0.5	3.02	0.4	2.04	0.9	5.06
7	"High Planes Grifter"	November 4, 2021	0.5	3.25	—N/a	—N/a	—N/a	—N/a
8	"Ashes to Ashes"	November 11, 2021	0.5	3.04	—N/a	—N/a	—N/a	—N/a
9	"The Christmas Episode"	December 9, 2021	0.6	3.50	0.7	2.63	1.3	6.13
10	"Nemesis"	January 6, 2022	0.5	3.31	—N/a	—N/a	—N/a	—N/a
11	"As Nottingham Was to Robin Hood"	January 13, 2022	0.6	3.25	—N/a	—N/a	—N/a	—N/a
12	"As Iago Is to Othello"	January 20, 2022	0.5	3.22	—N/a	—N/a	—N/a	—N/a
13	"As Hubris Is to Oedipus"	February 24, 2022	0.5	3.48	—N/a	—N/a	—N/a	—N/a
14	"...Wheatley Is to Stabler"	March 3, 2022	0.5	3.16	—N/a	—N/a	—N/a	—N/a
15	"Takeover"	March 10, 2022	0.5	3.11	—N/a	—N/a	—N/a	—N/a
16	"Guns & Roses"	March 17, 2022	0.5	3.43	—N/a	—N/a	—N/a	—N/a
17	"Can't Knock the Hustle"	April 7, 2022	0.4	2.98	—N/a	—N/a	—N/a	—N/a
18	"Change the Game"	April 14, 2022	0.5	3.15	—N/a	—N/a	—N/a	—N/a
19	"Dead Presidents"	April 28, 2022	0.5	3.18	—N/a	—N/a	—N/a	—N/a
20	"Lost One"	May 5, 2022	0.6	4.08	—N/a	—N/a	—N/a	—N/a
21	"Streets Is Watching"	May 12, 2022	0.5	3.16	—N/a	—N/a	—N/a	—N/a
22	"Friend or Foe"	May 19, 2022	0.4	3.37	—N/a	—N/a	—N/a	—N/a
