= Law & Order: Organized Crime season 1 =

Season of American television series

Law & Order: Organized Crime
- Season 1
- Showrunners: Matt Olmstead; Ilene Chaiken
- Starring: Christopher Meloni; Danielle Moné Truitt; Tamara Taylor; Ainsley Seiger; Dylan McDermott
- No. of episodes: 8

Release
- Original network: NBC
- Original release: April 1 – June 3, 2021

Season chronology
- Next → Season 2

The first season of Law & Order: Organized Crime premiered mid-season on April 1, 2021, on NBC and consisted of only 8 episodes right after the production of the 21st season of Law & Order: Special Victims Unit was suspended due to the COVID-19 pandemic. The season finale aired on June 3, 2021.

== Cast and characters ==
=== Main ===
- Christopher Meloni as Senior Detective Elliot Stabler
- Danielle Moné Truitt as Sergeant Ayanna Bell
- Tamara Taylor as Professor Angela Wheatley
- Ainsley Seiger as Junior Detective Jet Slootmaekers
- Dylan McDermott as Richard Wheatley

=== Crossover stars from Law & Order: Special Victims Unit ===
- Mariska Hargitay as Captain Olivia Benson
- Peter Scanavino as Assistant District Attorney Dominick Carisi Jr.
- Demore Barnes as Deputy Chief Christian Garland

=== Recurring ===
- Ben Chase as Detective 1st Grade Freddie Washburn
- Michael Rivera as Detective 2nd Grade Diego Morales
- Shauna Harley as Pilar Wheatley
- Nick Creegan as Richard "Richie" Wheatley Jr.
- Jaylin Fletcher as Ryan Wheatley
- Christina Marie Karis as Dana Wheatley
- Ibrahim Renno as Izak Bekher
- Charlotte Sullivan as Detective 3rd Grade Gina Cappelletti
- Autumn Mirassou as Maureen "Mau" Stabler
- Allison Siko as Kathleen Stabler
- Jeffrey Scaperrotta as Richard "Dickie" Stabler
- Kaitlyn Davidson as Elizabeth "Lizzie" Stabler
- Nicky Torchia as Elliot "Eli" Stabler Jr.
- Ryan Buggle as Noah Porter-Benson
- Keren Dukes as Denise Bullock
- Diany Rodriguez as ADA Maria Delgado
- Wendy Moniz as ADA Anne Frasier
- Daniel Oreskes as Lieutenant Marv Moennig
- Nicholas Baroudi as Joey Raven
- Steve Harris as Ellsworth Lee

=== Guests ===
- Isabel Gillies as Kathy Stabler

== Episodes ==
No. overall	No. in season	Title	Directed by	Written by	Original release date	Prod. code	U.S. viewers (millions)
1	1	"What Happens in Puglia"	Fred Berner	Teleplay by : Ilene Chaiken; Story by : Dick Wolf & Ilene Chaiken and Matt Olmstead	April 1, 2021	101	7.86
Detective Elliot Stabler, now a member of an elite organized crime task force, relocates to New York after years of absence and works to take down a crime family who has been selling fake N95 respirators and personal protection equipment overseas while searching for the people responsible for his wife's murder. Note : This episode concludes a crossover event that begins on Law & Order: Special Victims Unit season 22 episode 9.
2	2	"Not Your Father's Organized Crime"	Ken Girotti	Ilene Chaiken	April 8, 2021	102	4.84
The task force investigates stolen COVID-19 vaccines being distributed to corrupt doctors who are selling priority access. Meanwhile, Richard tries to bond with Richie over the family empire, but Dana tries to convince Richie that it is not worth it.
3	3	"Say Hello to My Little Friends"	John David Coles	Rick Marin	April 15, 2021	103	4.41
The task force gets intel on a public vaccination drive being organized by Richard, so they plan to foil it while also making a major bust in the case. Later, Richie tries to convince Gina to see him, but is met with pushback.
4	4	"The Stuff That Dreams Are Made Of"	Fred Berner	Juliet Lashinksy-Revene	April 22, 2021	104	4.36
Elliot, in denial about his worsening post-traumatic stress disorder, becomes subject to an intervention staged by his family and Olivia Benson, much to his dismay. Meanwhile, Gina tries to plant a bug in Richard's wine cellar while maintaining her cover in front of him.
5	5	"An Inferior Product"	Eriq La Salle	Zachary Reiter	May 13, 2021	105	4.45
After a failed drug bust ends with an informant dead and an arrest by abusive NYPD officers leaves Bell's nephew hospitalized, Stabler works with Benson to investigate. Wheatley orders a hit on a gang replicating Purple Magic. One of the survivors is implicated in supplying the drugs that killed Benson's half-brother Simon. Elliot learns from Bekher that Angela arranged the hit on Kathy. Note : This episode concludes a crossover event that begins on Law & Order: Special Victims Unit season 22 episode 13.
6	6	"I Got This Rat"	Bethany Rooney	Jean Kyoung Frazier & Rick Marin	May 20, 2021	106	4.24
Angela is arrested for ordering the hit on Kathy Stabler. She blames Richard for deceiving her by telling her it was Elliot who was responsible for her son Rafiq's death when, in reality, Richard killed him because he was ripping off Purple Magic. She then decides to cooperate with the investigation to put Richard away. Meanwhile, Dana finds out Gina is an undercover cop and informs Richard. A furious Richard then instructs a reluctant Richie to kill Gina. Bekher is present when Richie carries out the hit.
7	7	"Everybody Takes a Beating Sometime"	Jean de Segonzac	Marcus J. Guillory	May 27, 2021	107	4.04
One of Richard's men shoots and kills Bekher, later telling Richie there cannot be a witness to him murdering Gina. The task force sets up a sting with international arms dealer Gianluca Silvano, now an informant, making an illegal COVID-19 vaccine buy from Richard. When the buy goes as planned, Stabler and the task force move in to arrest Richard, his son, and his men. Richard tries to escape on a subway train, but Stabler overpowers and cuffs him. Dana is arrested by NYPD officers at the Contrapos office and some of Wheatley's accomplices are arrested, as well. Bell finds out that Gina is dead and confronts Richie in his jail cell.
8	8	"Forget It, Jake; It's Chinatown"	Fred Berner	Zachary Reiter & Juliet Lashinsky-Revene	June 3, 2021	108	4.02
The Wheatleys are formally indicted. Kept under protection in a hotel during the trial, Angela collapses in the shower; her bath supplies are found to be poisoned with a Novichok agent. Wheatley approaches a U.S. Attorney to move his case to federal court, where he offers up his associates in exchange for leniency. Having learned the truth of his grandfather's murder, Richie contracts a hit on his father from prison. Wheatley is wounded, but is rescued by Stabler and Bell. Using a hidden cell phone, Wheatley arranges for Stabler and Benson to meet in the hospital where Angela is recuperating. His inside man turns out to be Morales, who is killed by Bell, but not before injecting Angela with another poison.

== Ratings ==
Viewership and ratings per episode of Law & Order: Organized Crime season 1
No.	Title	Air date	Rating (18–49)	Viewers (millions)	DVR (18–49)	DVR viewers (millions)	Total (18–49)	Total viewers (millions)
1	"What Happens in Puglia"	April 1, 2021	1.6	7.86	0.8	3.06	2.3	10.92 (Note: Live +7 ratings were not available, so Live +3 ratings have been used instead.)
2	"Not Your Father's Organized Crime"	April 8, 2021	0.8	4.84	0.7	2.96	1.5	7.80
3	"Say Hello to My Little Friends"	April 15, 2021	0.7	4.41	—N/a	—N/a	—N/a	—N/a
4	"The Stuff That Dreams Are Made Of"	April 22, 2021	0.6	4.36	0.7	2.83	1.3	7.20
5	"An Inferior Product"	May 13, 2021	0.7	4.45	0.6	2.37	1.3	6.82
6	"I Got This Rat"	May 20, 2021	0.7	4.24	0.6	2.53	1.3	6.77
7	"Everybody Takes a Beating Sometime"	May 27, 2021	0.6	4.04	0.7	2.62	1.3	6.66
8	"Forget it, Jake; it's Chinatown"	June 3, 2021	0.6	4.02	0.6	2.38	1.2	6.40
