= Izabela Vidovic =

American actress (born 2001)

- Born: May 27, 2001 (age 25); Chicago, Illinois, U.S.
- Occupation: Actress
- Years active: 2006–present

Izabela Vidovic (Croatian: Vidović, pronounced [izaběla ʋîdoʋitɕ]; born May 27, 2001) is an American actress. She began as a child actress, and is known for her roles in the films Homefront and Wonder, and for her recurring role as Taylor Shaw in the Freeform television series The Fosters.

== Early life ==
Vidovic was born in Chicago, Illinois, to Croatian American father Mario Vidović and Bosnian mother Elizabeta Bašić. Elizabeta is a filmmaker, actress, and writer, born to Croats from the town of Busovača in Bosnia. Vidovic, who can speak Croatian, started performing in stage productions by the time she was seven, appearing in Mary Poppins, Camp Rock, and Annie. Vidovic moved on to film and television productions in 2011.

== Career ==
Vidovic has appeared in several series on The CW. In 2013, she played Charlotte on The 100 in the first-season episodes "Murphy’s Law" and "Earth Kills". In 2017, Vidovic first played a young Kara Danvers / Kara Zor-El in the Supergirl season 3 flashback episode "Midvale", then in 2021 reprised this role for two time-travel episodes of season 6. Also in 2017, she played the lead character's sister Olivia in the film Wonder. The following year, Vidovic had a multi-episode arc in the fourth season of iZombie as Isobel. In 2019, she had a recurring role in the fourth season of Veronica Mars on Hulu.

== Personal life ==
Vidovic married actor Jack Alcott on October 12, 2025.

== Filmography ==
=== Film ===
Year	Title	Role	Notes	Refs
2008	Thoda Pyar Thoda Magic	Anna	Uncredited	
2012	Find Me	Frankie		
2013	Grave Secrets	Robin		
2013	Homefront	Maddy Broker		
2017	Wonder	Olivia "Via" Pullman		
2021	Severed Silence	Sunny		

=== Television ===
Year	Title	Role	Notes	Refs
2006	Psych	Speller 12	Episode: "The Spellingg Bee" (uncredited)	
2011	Raising Hope	8-Year-Old Delilah	Episode: "What Up, Cuz?"	
2011	Conan	Young Girl	Episode: "The Double-Fudging of Vanessa Del Rio"	
2011	Criminal Minds: Suspect Behavior	Young Rachel	Episode: "The Time Is Now"	
2012	Up All Night	Tanya Moore	Episode: "New Boss"	
2012	Harry's Law	Shelby Higgins	Episode: "After the Lovin'"	
2012	Christmas Angel	Olivia Mead	TV movie	
2012	Deadtime Stories	Robin Peterson	Episode: "Grave Secrets"	
2012	Help for the Holidays	Ally VanCamp	TV movie (Hallmark)	
2012	Little Brother	Sam Alexis	TV movie	
2014	The 100	Charlotte	3–4 episodes (season 1)	
2014	Bones	Daughter	Episode: "The Nail in the Coffin"	
2014–2015	About a Boy	Shea Garcia-Miller	Recurring role	
2015	Halo: The Fall of Reach	Linda (Teen)	TV miniseries; voice role	
2015–2018	The Fosters	Taylor Shaw	Guest role (seasons 2–3); recurring role (seasons 4–5)	
2017–2021	Supergirl	Young Kara	Recurring role	
2018	iZombie	Isobel	4 episodes	
2019	Veronica Mars	Matty Ross	Recurring role (season 4)	
2021	Just Beyond	Lily Renton	Episode: "Unfiltered"	
2021, 2024	Law & Order: Organized Crime	Rita Lasku	Recurring role (season 2); guest role (season 4)	
