= Law & Order: Organized Crime season 4 =

Season of American television series

Law & Order: Organized Crime
- Season 4
- Promotional poster
- Showrunner: John Shiban
- Starring: Christopher Meloni; Danielle Moné Truitt; Ainsley Seiger; Rick Gonzalez
- No. of episodes: 13

Release
- Original network: NBC
- Original release: January 18 – May 16, 2024

Season chronology
- ← Previous; Season 3 Next → Season 5

The fourth season of Law & Order: Organized Crime premiered on January 18, 2024, on NBC and consisted of 13 episodes due to the writers' strike. This is the last season to air on NBC, before the series moved to Peacock. The season finale aired on May 16, 2024.

== Cast and characters ==
=== Main ===
- Christopher Meloni as Senior Detective Elliot Stabler
- Danielle Moné Truitt as Sergeant Ayanna Bell
- Ainsley Seiger as Detective 2nd Grade Jet Slootmaekers
- Rick Gonzalez as Detective 2nd Grade Bobby Reyes

=== Crossover stars from Law & Order: Special Victims Unit ===
- Dann Florek as Former Captain Donald Cragen
- Peter Scanavino as Assistant District Attorney Dominick Carisi Jr.
- Tamara Tunie as Dr. Melinda Warner

=== Recurring ===
- Abubakr Ali as Detective Samir Bashir
- Tate Ellington as Professor Kyle Vargas
- Stephen Lang as Angus Boone
- Tom Payne as Julian Emery
- Rivera Reese as ATF Agent Trisha Beck
- Maryam Roberts as Dahlia
- Lois Smith as Doris Boone
- Michael Trotter as Joe Stabler Jr.
- Autumn Mirassou as Maureen "Mau" Stabler
- Allison Siko as Kathleen Stabler
- Jeffrey Scaperrotta as Richard "Dickie" Stabler
- Kaitlyn Davidson as Elizabeth "Lizzie" Stabler
- Nicky Torchia as "Eli" Stabler Jr.
- Michael Trotter as Joseph "Joe" Stabler Jr.
- Nicole Shalhoub as Captain Nazanin Shah

=== Special guest stars ===
- Ellen Burstyn as Bernadette Stabler
- Dean Norris as Randall Stabler
- Jennifer Ehle as Meredith Bonner
- Keith Carradine as Clay Bonner

=== Guest stars ===
- Will Janowitz as Eric Bonner
- James Yaegashi as ATF Special Agent Marcus Cole

== Episodes ==
| No. overall | No. in season | Title | Directed by | Written by | Original release date | Prod. code | U.S. viewers (millions) |
|---|---|---|---|---|---|---|---|
| 53 | 1 | "Memory Lane" | Jon Cassar | John Shiban & Amy Berg | January 18, 2024 | 401 | 3.90 |
icon
| 54 | 2 | "Deliver Us from Evil" | Jonathan Brown | Will Pascoe & Bridget Tyler | January 25, 2024 | 402 | 3.71 |
When a local mosque is bombed, killing the imam, Stabler meets with Bashir, a hate crimes officer who believes more is at play. Jet is keen on Vargas' program, but the others are more skeptical. Reyes and Jet struggle with their feelings. Stabler also reunites with Dr. Melinda Warner, who he hasn't seen in twelve years. Elliot's estranged brother Randall is invited to NY by their mother, who wants to see him.
| 55 | 3 | "End of Innocence" | Jon Cassar | Amy Berg & Katrina Cabrera Ortega | February 1, 2024 | 403 | 3.67 |
Stabler and Bashir search for an asylum seeker and his son who have gone missing from the mosque. This leads them to a smuggling ring using Afghani refugees to smuggle gems into the country within their bodies. They break up the ring, kill those behind the bombing, and rescue the son who was being held hostage to coerce his father. Stabler learns that his younger brother Joe is back in NY.
| 56 | 4 | "The Last Supper" | Stephen Surjik | John Shiban & Liz Sagal | February 8, 2024 | 404 | 3.51 |
The widow Santos contacts Stabler and agrees to testify for Carisi against Los Santos and go into witness protection with her two children because her family is being threatened by her brother-in-law. They stash the family in a safe house guarded by the team, except for Stabler who killed their father, until they can be picked up. Stabler has a family dinner at his house so the family can see his mother before she goes into a retirement home. The dinner devolves into drunken arguments and recriminations as secrets from the past are revealed. Stabler is called away when Los Santos storm the safe house after being tipped off by the daughter. During the firefight, Stabler fights his way into the house and tries to get the Santos' and his team out. The son picks up a gun and shoots Bell, so Stabler throws him to the ground to stop him getting off another round. Bell is rushed to the hospital and Stabler is suspended pending an IAB investigation into the incident.
| 57 | 5 | "Missing Persons" | Nelson McCormick | Amy Berg & Davon Briggs | February 22, 2024 | 405 | 3.59 |
Bell is recovering in the hospital. Stabler is suspended and cleaning up after the dinner party when he finds some brown heroin. Jet and Reyes are questioned by IAB. A friend of Rita Lasku, the waitress Stabler helped while undercover with the Kostas, tells Stabler that Rita is missing and shows him a video of her at a party with the Westbook DA. Stabler turns up at the DA's house and asks about his friend Rita before being thrown in jail by Chief Bonner. Stabler discovers that a local waitress also went missing after a party and her brother gives him her burner. Jet, Reyes, Bashir and Vargas have arrived after tracking Stabler's phone to Long Island. Stabler calls a number on the waitress' burner and is sent a video of Lasku tied up in a bunker. Stabler finds the bunker and frees the waitress who is tied up inside. He is attacked by the kidnapper, who escapes after a fight. Outside, Stabler digs up Lasku's body in the sand. Chief Bonner takes over the investigation and more bodies are found in the dunes.
| 58 | 6 | "Beyond the Sea" | Jean de Segonzac | John Shiban & Will Pascoe | February 29, 2024 | 406 | 3.28 |
icon
| 59 | 7 | "Original Sin" | Juan J. Campanella | Liz Sagal & Bridget Tyler | March 14, 2024 | 407 | 3.43 |
The squad backs up Stabler in pursuing a murder case outside of their jurisdiction as an unlikely ally provides a key piece of evidence. Bell works to find a way to get Stabler back on the job.
| 60 | 8 | "Sins of Our Fathers" | Milena Govich | Amy Berg & Katrina Cabrera Ortega | March 21, 2024 | 408 | 3.16 |
icon
| 61 | 9 | "Semper Fi" | Carlos Bernard | John Shiban & Katie Letien | April 11, 2024 | 409 | 2.85 |
icon
| 62 | 10 | "Crossroads" | Jon Cassar | Amy Berg & Davon Briggs | April 18, 2024 | 410 | 3.27 |
icon
| 63 | 11 | "Redcoat" | Leslie Hope | Liz Sagal | May 2, 2024 | 411 | 2.64 |
icon
| 64 | 12 | "Goodnight" | Gonzalo Amat | Amy Berg & Will Pascoe | May 9, 2024 | 412 | 2.75 |
icon
| 65 | 13 | "Stabler's Lament" | Jon Cassar | John Shiban | May 16, 2024 | 413 | 2.90 |
icon

== Ratings ==
Viewership and ratings per episode of Law & Order: Organized Crime season 4
| No. | Title | Air date | Rating (18–49) | Viewers (millions) | DVR (18–49) | DVR viewers (millions) | Total (18–49) | Total viewers (millions) |
|---|---|---|---|---|---|---|---|---|
| 1 | "Memory Lane" | January 18, 2024 | 0.5 | 3.90 | —N/a | —N/a | —N/a | —N/a |
| 2 | "Deliver Us From Evil" | January 25, 2024 | 0.4 | 3.71 | —N/a | —N/a | —N/a | —N/a |
| 3 | "End of Innocence" | February 2, 2024 | 0.4 | 3.67 | —N/a | —N/a | —N/a | —N/a |
| 4 | "The Last Supper" | February 8, 2024 | 0.4 | 3.51 | —N/a | —N/a | —N/a | —N/a |
| 5 | "Missing Persons" | February 22, 2024 | 0.4 | 3.59 | —N/a | —N/a | —N/a | —N/a |
| 6 | "Beyond the Sea" | February 29, 2024 | 0.4 | 3.28 | —N/a | —N/a | —N/a | —N/a |
| 7 | "Original Sin" | March 14, 2024 | 0.3 | 3.43 | 0.2 | 1.91 | 0.5 | 5.34 |
| 8 | "Sins of Our Fathers" | March 21, 2024 | 0.3 | 3.16 | —N/a | —N/a | —N/a | —N/a |
| 9 | "Semper Fi" | April 11, 2024 | 0.3 | 2.85 | —N/a | —N/a | —N/a | —N/a |
| 10 | "Crossroads" | April 18, 2024 | 0.3 | 3.27 | —N/a | —N/a | —N/a | —N/a |
| 11 | "Redcoat" | May 2, 2024 | 0.2 | 2.64 | —N/a | —N/a | —N/a | —N/a |
| 12 | "Goodnight" | May 9, 2024 | 0.3 | 2.75 | —N/a | —N/a | —N/a | —N/a |
| 13 | "Stabler's Lament" | May 16, 2024 | 0.3 | 2.90 | —N/a | —N/a | —N/a | —N/a |
