= Craig Gore =

Craig Gore may refer to:

- Craig Gore (businessman)
- Craig Gore (screenwriter)
