= David Ayer =

American filmmaker (born 1968)

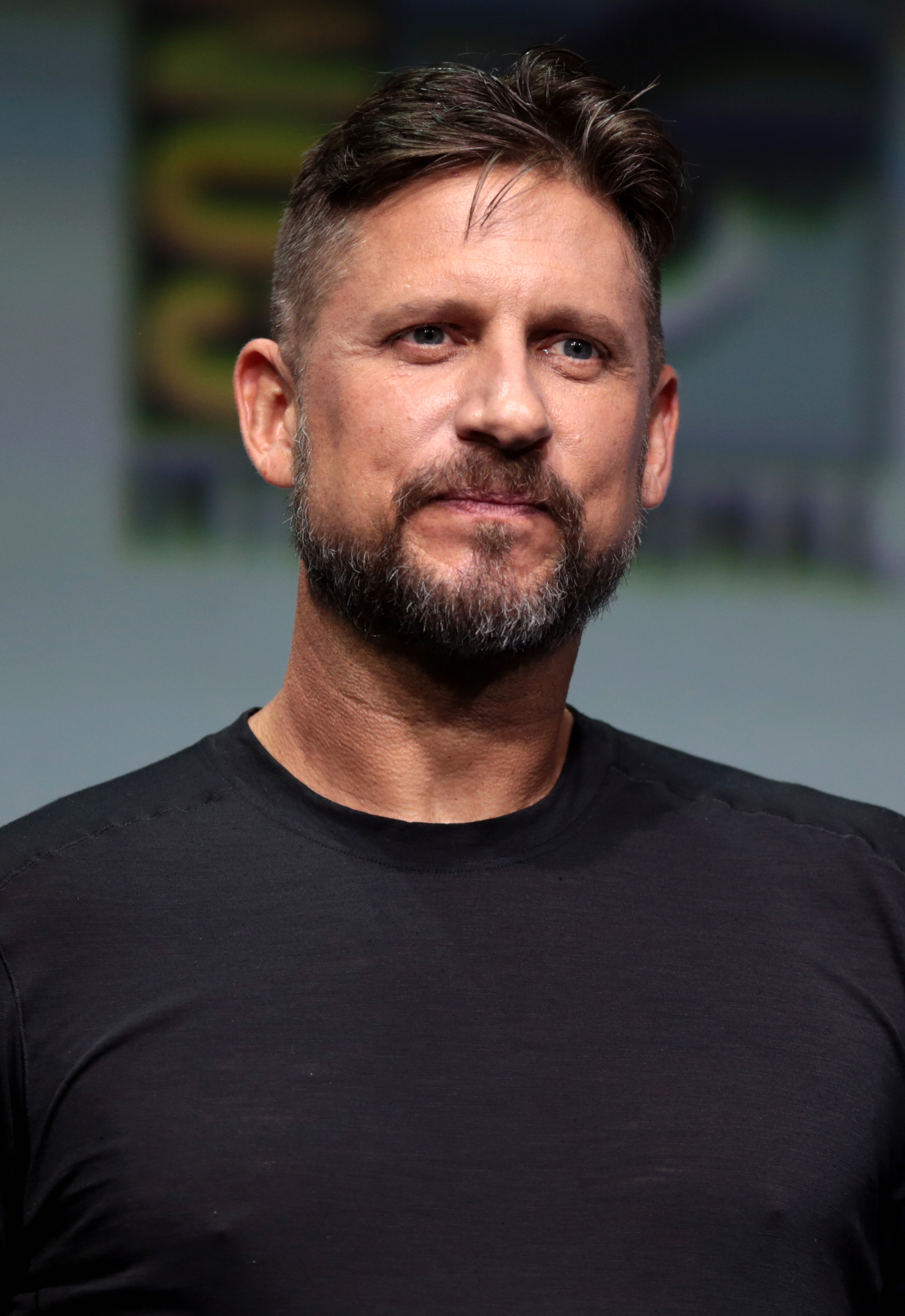
- Ayer at the 2017 San Diego Comic-Con
- Born: January 18, 1968 (age 58); Champaign, Illinois, U.S.
- Occupations: Film director; film producer; screenwriter
- Years active: 2000–present
- Spouse: Mireya Ayer (m. 2002; sep. 2017)
- Children: 4

David Ayer (born January 18, 1968) is an American filmmaker. Born in Champaign, Illinois, Ayer grew up in Los Angeles, California, where his experiences in South Central Los Angeles became the inspiration for many of his screenplays.

Ayer made his breakthrough with his screenplay to Training Day, directed by Antoine Fuqua, and made his directorial debut with Harsh Times. Ayer wrote and directed End of Watch, which was acclaimed for its realistic portrayal of Los Angeles police.

Ayer's other films include Fury, The Tax Collector, Sabotage, Suicide Squad, The Beekeeper, and A Working Man.

== Early life and education ==
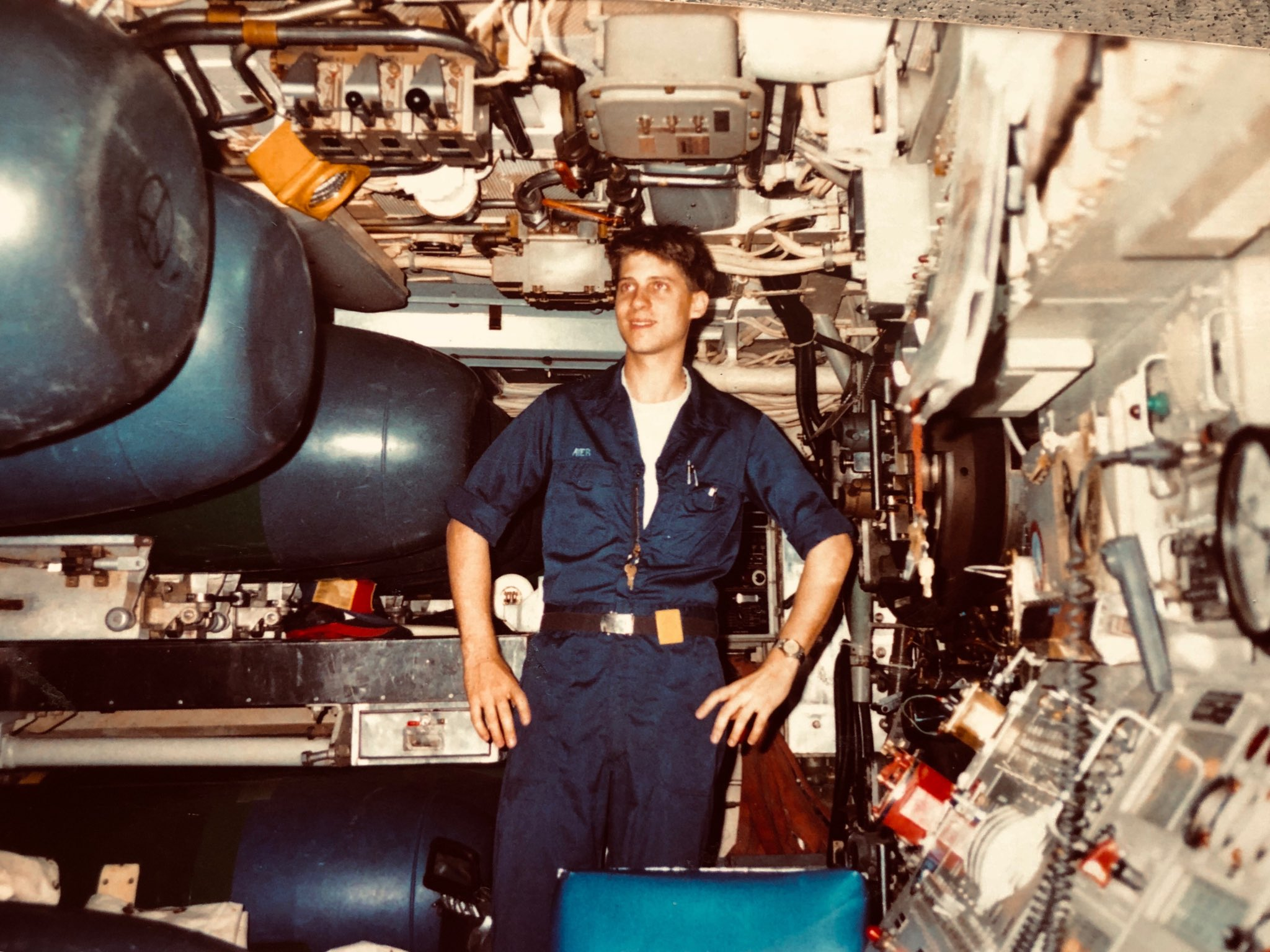
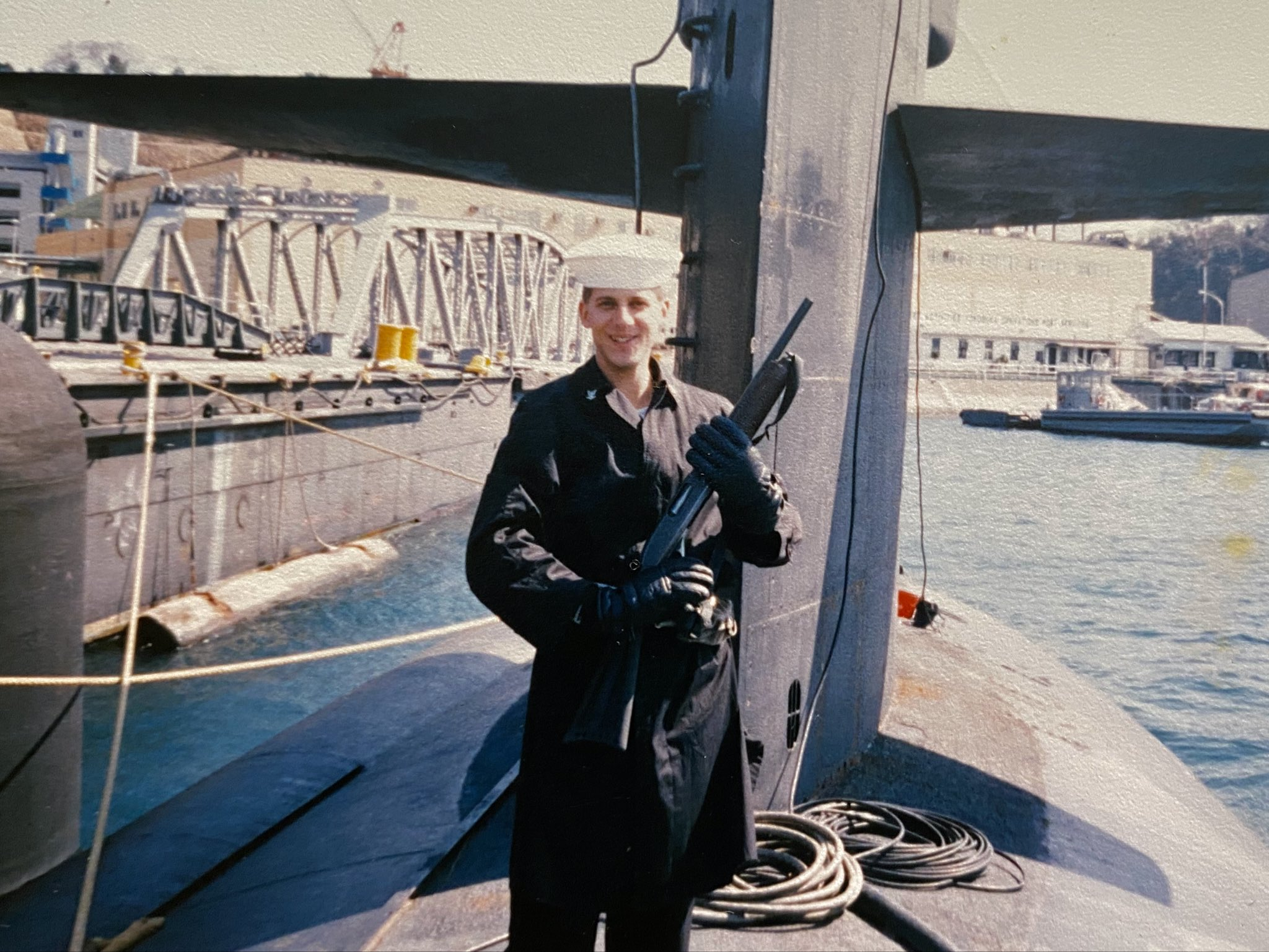
Ayer as a submariner in the U.S. Navy during the 1980s.

Ayer was born in Champaign, Illinois, on January 18, 1968, and grew up in Bloomington, Minnesota, and Bethesda, Maryland, where he was kicked out of his house by his parents as a teenager. Ayer lived with his cousin in Los Angeles, California, where his experiences in South Central Los Angeles became the inspiration for many of his films. Ayer dropped out of high school and painted houses for a living. Ayer enlisted in the U.S. Navy as a submarine sonar technician (STS) aboard the USS Haddo (SSN-604). He has spoken favorably about his time in the Navy and has credited it with his successful filmmaking career. His grandfather was also in the Navy in the 1950s.

== Career ==
Ayer's screenplay, U-571 was based on his experiences as a submariner in the U.S. Navy. Ayer collaborated on the screenplay for The Fast and the Furious in 2001. Ayer wrote the screenplay for crime drama Dark Blue, and it was his research into the Los Angeles Police Department that led to his most prominent screenplay, Training Day. Ayer signed a contract to write a screenplay for S.W.A.T., which was based on his original story pitch. The film was directed by Clark Johnson and released in 2003.

In 2006, Ayer admitted that U-571 had distorted history, and said that he would not do it again. He told BBC Radio 4's The Film Programme that he "did not feel good" about suggesting that Americans, rather than the British, had captured the naval Enigma cipher: "It was a distortion ... a mercenary decision ... to create this parallel history in order to drive the film for an American audience. Both my grandparents were officers in the Second World War, and I would be personally offended if somebody distorted their achievements."

Ayer's directorial debut was with a film he also wrote, Harsh Times -- an action-drama set on the streets of South Central Los Angeles, showing how drug use and past military experiences affects people's attempts to lead normal lives. He went on to direct the action thriller Street Kings, which was released in 2008.

Ayer later wrote and directed End of Watch, an action thriller about the daily lives of two South Central Los Angeles policemen, played by Jake Gyllenhaal and Michael Peña. The film was released in the fall of 2012 to profitable box-office returns and favorable reception from critics, with Roger Ebert naming it as the fourth-best film of 2012, hailing it as "one of the best police movies in recent years". His next film was the action thriller Sabotage, starring Arnold Schwarzenegger; the film was released on March 28, 2014. He wrote and directed the World War II-set action film, Fury, starring Brad Pitt, Shia LaBeouf and Logan Lerman; the film was released in October 2014.

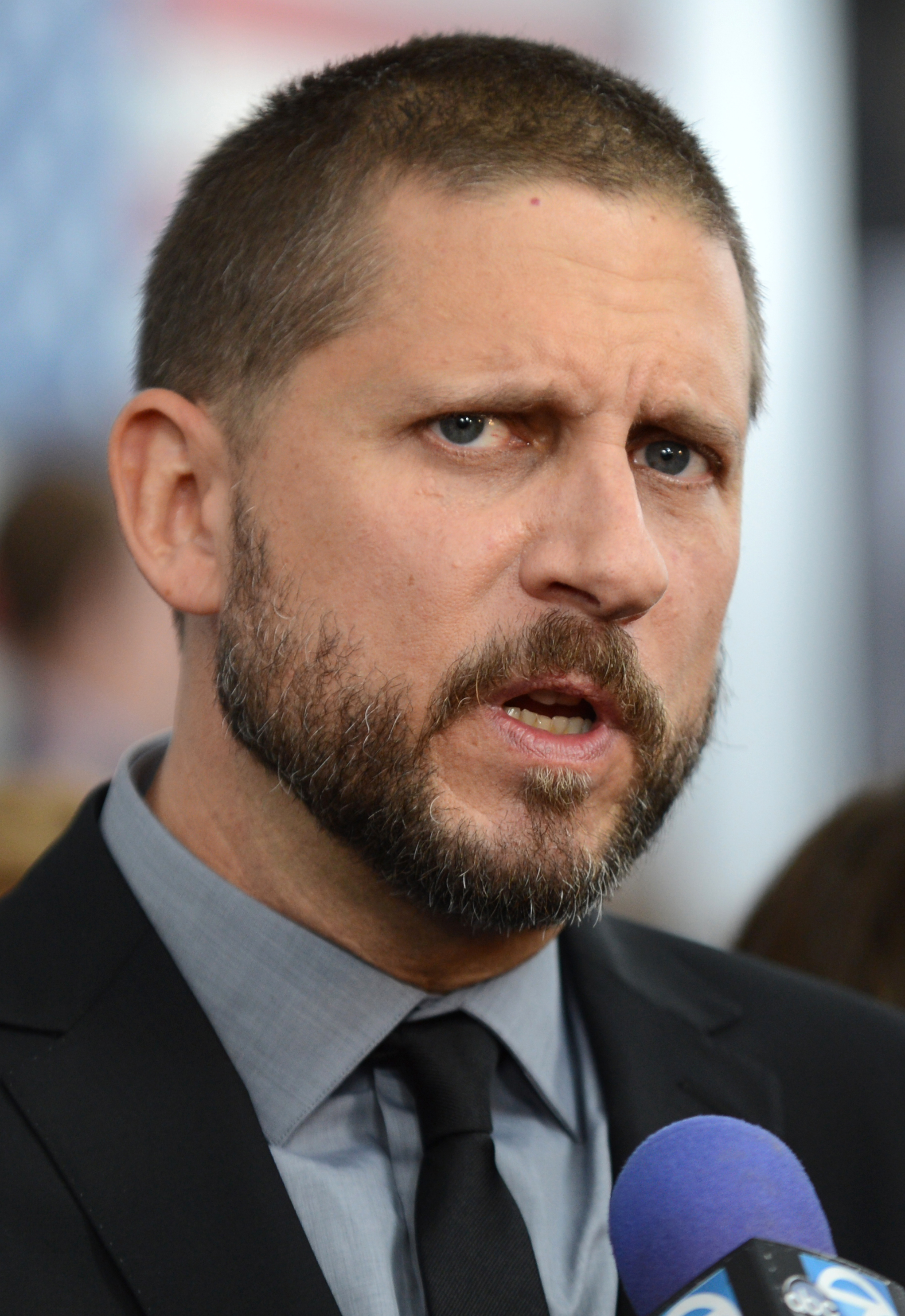
Ayer in 2014

Ayer wrote and directed the film adaptation of the comic book Suicide Squad, which was released on August 5, 2016. The film, along with Ayer's directing, received negative reviews, though it became his most commercially successful film to date.

Ayer also directed Bright, "a contemporary cop thriller, but with fantastical elements", starring Will Smith and Joel Edgerton with a script penned by Max Landis that Ayer rewrote. Netflix picked up the film for a $90 million deal. The film was released on December 22, 2017. On January 3, 2018, Netflix confirmed they were moving ahead with the sequel for Bright, with Smith and Edgerton reprising their roles and Ayer directing and writing the script with Evan Spiliotopoulos, the filming of which began in March 2019. This ultimately did not happen due to Will Smith's schedule, and on May 5, 2020, he was replaced with Louis Leterrier as Ayer wanted to focus on The Dirty Dozen remake for Warner Bros.

On December 13, 2016, Ayer was brought on board to direct the spin-off of Suicide Squad, Gotham City Sirens, which evolved into Birds of Prey, directed by Cathy Yan, and starring Margot Robbie reprising her role of Harley Quinn. Gotham City Sirens remained in development, but as of April 2021, Gotham City Sirens has been put on pause.

Ayer established Cedar Park Entertainment on January 4, 2018, with former head of programming at Audience Network, Chris Long. Primarily established to produce films and television shows, the first film Cedar Park produced was 2020's The Tax Collector, Ayer's second collaboration with actor Shia LaBeouf. On June 21, 2018, it set a first look deal with Entertainment One, and it will cover television series, both scripted and unscripted.

In May 2022, Ayer signed on to direct action thriller The Beekeeper for Miramax, written by Kurt Wimmer and starring Jason Statham, with Metro-Goldwyn-Mayer later acquiring domestic distribution rights. In October 2023, it was announced that Ayer and Statham would reunite to work on A Working Man, from a screenplay by Sylvester Stallone and Ayer, based on the novel Levon's Trade by Chuck Dixon, with production expected to begin in March 2024.

== Filmography ==
Film

Year	Title	Director	Writer	Producer
2000	U-571	No	Yes	No
2001	Training Day	No	Yes	Co-producer
2001	The Fast and the Furious	No	Yes	No
2002	Dark Blue	No	Yes	No
2003	S.W.A.T.	No	Yes	No
2005	Harsh Times	Yes	Yes	Yes
2008	Street Kings	Yes	No	No
2012	End of Watch	Yes	Yes	Yes
2014	Sabotage	Yes	Yes	Yes
2014	Fury	Yes	Yes	Yes
2016	Suicide Squad	Yes	Yes (Note: The footage shot during the film’s principal photography was written by David Ayer but the footage shot during the film’s reshoots/additional photography (described as being a higher amount than the average for a film) was written by Geoff Johns. Ayer retained sole writing credit for the finished film.)	No
2017	Bright	Yes	No	Yes
2020	The Tax Collector	Yes	Yes	Yes
2024	The Beekeeper	Yes	No	Yes
2025	A Working Man	Yes	Yes	Yes
2026	Heart of the Beast	Yes	No	Yes

Cameo roles

Year	Title	Role
2001	Training Day	Russian mafia hitman
2008	Street Kings	Gang member prisoner in L.A. County Jail
2016	Suicide Squad	Belle Reve prison guard (Extended Cut)

Television

Year	Title	Director	Executive producer	Note
2020	Deputy	Yes	Yes	Episodes "Graduation Day" and "10-8 Outlaws"

Other roles

Year	Title	Role
1998	The Patriot	Early screenplay drafts
2001	Training Day	Stunts
2003	The Hunted	Uncredited script revisions
2004	Taking Lives	Uncredited script revisions
2008	HBO First Look	Special production footage
2009	X-Men Origins: Wolverine	Early screenplay drafts
2009	Law Abiding Citizen	Uncredited script revisions
2014	Deliver Us from Evil	Early screenplay drafts
2020	Birds of Prey	Executive producer
2021	The Suicide Squad	Special thanks
2023	Snorkeling	Executive producer
2024	The Beekeeper	Additional literary material
2024	Bosco	Executive producer

== Unrealized projects ==
Year	Title and description
2000s	Squids, a coming-of-age story set on a nuclear submarine during the waning days of the Cold War.
2000s	The Wild Bunch, a modern-day remake of the 1969 film for Warner Bros. Pictures Ayer had written his own script, "updating the tale", according to Film Review.
2000s	Mafia Cop, A film based on the life and story of Louis Eppolito, who was convicted of murdering for the mob while serving as an NYPD detective.
2000s	A remake of The Wild Geese that would have been directed by Rupert Sanders
2000s	Armored, an American remake of the 2004 French thriller Cash Truck with Andrew Kevin Walker as co-writer and F. Gary Gray to direct. The film would eventually be directed and co-written by Guy Ritchie and released as Wrath of Man.
2000s	A feature film adaptation of the Wired article "Deep Sea Cowboys," about a deep-sea salvage crew.
2000s	Last Man, a science fiction action film for New Regency and 20th Century Fox.
2010s	A reboot of Commando for 20th Century Fox.
2010s	An untitled series about U.S. Special Forces soldiers who take on new lives undercover inside the LA underworld.
2010s	A remake of Scarface for Universal Pictures from a screenplay by Jonathan Herman and the Coen brothers.
2010s	Family Crimes, a Latina crime drama series for Starz that Ayer was set to direct, write, and executive produce alongside Jerry Bruckheimer, Jonathan Littman, and KristieAnne Reed.
2010s	The Bone Church, a television series adaptation of Stephen King's poem that Ayer was set to executive produce with Chris Long.
2010s	Cointelpro, a script written by Leon Hendrix and Ajani Jackson that’s set in 1960s Chicago and centers on a campaign to tear apart the young Civil Rights movement from the inside.
2010s	Sons and Soldiers, a television adaptation of Bruce Anderson's World War II novel, Ayer was also set to direct the pilot episode and produce.
2010s	Major Crimes, an anthology series that would follow the most daring heists, robberies, and crimes in Los Angeles history. Ayer would’ve executive produced alongside Chris Long and Tucker Tooley.
2010s	A war film about the Second Battle of El Alamein for Lionsgate Films from a screenplay by James Coyne.
2010s	DEA, a crime drama written by Craig Gore that Ayer was going to executive produce for eOne and Fox Entertainment
2010s	Troubleshooter, a high-octane, off-beat family soap written by Sheri Elwood
2010s	North Hollywood, a film based on the deadly 1997 North Hollywood shootout that Ayer would’ve produced and was to be directed by Albert Hughes.
2010s	The Dirty Dozen, a contemporary-set reboot of 1967 film of the same name that was going to be a co-production between Genre Films and Warner Bros. Pictures.
2020s	Six Years, a feature film adaptation of Harlan Coben's novel for Netflix, with Ayer also set to produce the film with his Cedar Point Entertainment partner Chris Long.
2020s	End of Watch, a television adaptation of the 2012 film that Ayer was set to executive produce and co-write a pilot for Fox.
2020s	Lollipop, a racing series that will invite audiences to actively participate in a virtual racing circuit linked to the plot.
