= List of Law & Order: Organized Crime episodes =

Law & Order: Organized Crime is an American crime drama television series that premiered on April 1, 2021, on NBC. The seventh series in the Law & Order franchise and a spin-off of Law & Order and Law & Order: Special Victims Unit, the series stars Christopher Meloni as Elliot Stabler, reprising his role from SVU.

As of June 12, 2025, 75 episodes of Law & Order: Organized Crime have aired, concluding the fifth season.

== Series overview ==
Season	Episodes	Originally released		
Season	Episodes	First released	Last released	Network
1	8	April 1, 2021	June 3, 2021	NBC
2	22	September 23, 2021	May 19, 2022	NBC
3	22	September 22, 2022	May 18, 2023	NBC
4	13	January 18, 2024	May 16, 2024	NBC
5	10	April 17, 2025	June 12, 2025	NBC/Peacock

== Episodes ==
=== Season 1 (2021) ===
No. overall	No. in season	Title	Directed by	Written by	Original release date	Prod. code	U.S. viewers (millions)
1	1	"What Happens in Puglia"	Fred Berner	Teleplay by : Ilene Chaiken; Story by : Dick Wolf & Ilene Chaiken and Matt Olmstead	April 1, 2021	101	7.86
2	2	"Not Your Father's Organized Crime"	Ken Girotti	Ilene Chaiken	April 8, 2021	102	4.84
3	3	"Say Hello to My Little Friends"	John David Coles	Rick Marin	April 15, 2021	103	4.41
4	4	"The Stuff That Dreams Are Made Of"	Fred Berner	Juliet Lashinksy-Revene	April 22, 2021	104	4.36
5	5	"An Inferior Product"	Eriq La Salle	Zachary Reiter	May 13, 2021	105	4.45
6	6	"I Got This Rat"	Bethany Rooney	Jean Kyoung Frazier & Rick Marin	May 20, 2021	106	4.24
7	7	"Everybody Takes a Beating Sometime"	Jean de Segonzac	Marcus J. Guillory	May 27, 2021	107	4.04
8	8	"Forget It, Jake; It's Chinatown"	Fred Berner	Zachary Reiter & Juliet Lashinsky-Revene	June 3, 2021	108	4.02

=== Season 2 (2021–2022) ===
No. overall	No. in season	Title	Directed by	Written by	Original release date	Prod. code	U.S. viewers (millions)
9	1	"The Man with No Identity"	Bethany Rooney	Ilene Chaiken & Kimberly Ann Harrison	September 23, 2021	201	4.18
10	2	"New World Order"	Fred Berner	Nichole Beattie	September 30, 2021	202	4.12
11	3	"The Outlaw Eddie Wagner"	John Polson	Eric Haywood	September 30, 2021	203	4.12
12	4	"For a Few Lekë More"	Jean de Segonzac	Zachary Reiter	October 7, 2021	204	3.20
13	5	"The Good, The Bad, and The Lovely"	Terry Miller	Juliet Lashinsky-Revene	October 14, 2021	205	3.32
14	6	"Unforgivable"	Monica Raymund	Rick Marin	October 21, 2021	206	3.02
15	7	"High Planes Grifter"	Alex Hall	Kimberly Ann Harrison	November 4, 2021	207	3.25
16	8	"Ashes to Ashes"	Jean de Segonzac	Kimberly Ann Harrison & Nichole Beattie	November 11, 2021	208	3.04
17	9	"The Christmas Episode"	Fred Berner	Zachary Reiter & Rick Marin	December 9, 2021	209	3.50
18	10	"Nemesis"	Jim McKay	Eric Haywood & Juliet Lashinsky-Revene	January 6, 2022	210	3.31
19	11	"As Nottingham Was to Robin Hood"	Alex Hall	Kimberly Ann Harrison & Nichole Beattie	January 13, 2022	211	3.25
20	12	"As Iago Is to Othello"	Fred Berner	Rick Marin	January 20, 2022	212	3.22
21	13	"As Hubris Is to Oedipus"	Stephen Surjik	Emmy Higgins & Zachary Reiter	February 24, 2022	213	3.48
22	14	"...Wheatley Is to Stabler"	Sarah Boyd	Ilene Chaiken & Kimberly Ann Harrison	March 3, 2022	214	3.16
23	15	"Takeover"	John Polson	Eric Haywood	March 10, 2022	215	3.11
24	16	"Guns & Roses"	Jean de Segonzac	Juliet Lashinsky-Revene	March 17, 2022	216	3.43
25	17	"Can't Knock the Hustle"	Jonathan Brown	Kimberly Ann Harrison & Emmy Higgins	April 7, 2022	217	2.98
26	18	"Change the Game"	John Polson	Rick Marin	April 14, 2022	218	3.15
27	19	"Dead Presidents"	Rob J. Greenlea	Zachary Reiter	April 28, 2022	219	3.18
28	20	"Lost One"	Cherie Nowlan	Juliet Lashinsky-Revene	May 5, 2022	220	4.08
29	21	"Streets Is Watching"	Sharon Lewis	Erica Michelle Butler	May 12, 2022	221	3.16
30	22	"Friend or Foe"	Ken Girotti	Rick Marin & Barry O'Brien	May 19, 2022	222	3.37

=== Season 3 (2022–2023) ===
No. overall	No. in season	Title	Directed by	Written by	Original release date	Prod. code	U.S. viewers (millions)
31	1	"Gimme Shelter – Part One"	Jean de Segonzac	Rick Eid & Gwen Sigan	September 22, 2022	301	4.97
32	2	"Everybody Knows the Dice Are Loaded"	John Polson	Bryan Goluboff	September 29, 2022	302	3.60
33	3	"Catch Me if You Can"	Kate Woods	Michael Konyves & Juliet Lashinsky-Revene	October 6, 2022	303	3.00
34	4	"Spirit in the Sky"	Simon Brand	Jorge Zamacona	October 13, 2022	304	3.12
35	5	"Behind Blue Eyes"	John Polson	Barry O'Brien	October 27, 2022	305	3.18
36	6	"Blaze of Glory"	Anna Dokoza	Daniel "Koa" Beaty	November 3, 2022	306	2.93
37	7	"All That Glitters"	Simón Brand	Josh Fagin & Candice Sanchez McFarlane	November 10, 2022	307	3.00
38	8	"Whipping Post"	Sharon Lewis	Jorge Zamacona	November 17, 2022	308	3.49
39	9	"Last Christmas"	Jean de Segonzac	Sean Jablonski	December 8, 2022	309	3.28
40	10	"Trap"	John Polson	Emmy Higgins	January 5, 2023	310	3.79
41	11	"The Infiltration Game"	Stephen Surjik	Alec Wells	January 12, 2023	311	3.39
42	12	"Partners in Crime"	Tess Malone	Teleplay by : Barry O'Brien; Story by : Barry O'Brien & John A. McCormack	January 26, 2023	312	4.16
43	13	"Punch Drunk"	Brenna Malloy	Juliet Lashinsky-Revene	February 2, 2023	313	3.65
44	14	"All in the Game"	Oz Scott	Michael Konyves	February 16, 2023	314	3.45
45	15	"The Wild and the Innocent"	Alex Zakrzewski	Jorge Zamacona	February 23, 2023	315	3.65
46	16	"Chinatown"	Milena Govich	Josh Fagin & Candice Sanchez McFarlane	March 23, 2023	316	3.24
47	17	"Blood Ties"	Jonathan Brown	Alec Wells	March 30, 2023	317	2.88
48	18	"Tag:GEN"	John Polson	Nick Culbertson	April 6, 2023	318	3.29
49	19	"A Diplomatic Solution"	Jon Cassar	Christina Piña	April 27, 2023	319	3.24
50	20	"Pareto Principle"	Gonzalo Amat	David Graziano & Brendan Feeney	May 4, 2023	320	3.08
51	21	"Shadowërk"	Tess Malone	Teleplay by : Brendan Feeney & Candice Sanchez McFarlane; Story by : David Graziano	May 11, 2023	321	3.48
52	22	"With Many Names"	John Polson	Teleplay by : Julie Martin & Nicholas Evangelista; Story by : David Graziano	May 18, 2023	322	4.00

=== Season 4 (2024) ===
No. overall	No. in season	Title	Directed by	Written by	Original release date	Prod. code	U.S. viewers (millions)
53	1	"Memory Lane"	Jon Cassar	John Shiban & Amy Berg	January 18, 2024	401	3.90
54	2	"Deliver Us from Evil"	Jonathan Brown	Will Pascoe & Bridget Tyler	January 25, 2024	402	3.71
55	3	"End of Innocence"	Jon Cassar	Amy Berg & Katrina Cabrera Ortega	February 1, 2024	403	3.67
56	4	"The Last Supper"	Stephen Surjik	John Shiban & Liz Sagal	February 8, 2024	404	3.51
57	5	"Missing Persons"	Nelson McCormick	Amy Berg & Davon Briggs	February 22, 2024	405	3.59
58	6	"Beyond the Sea"	Jean de Segonzac	John Shiban & Will Pascoe	February 29, 2024	406	3.28
59	7	"Original Sin"	Juan J. Campanella	Liz Sagal & Bridget Tyler	March 14, 2024	407	3.43
60	8	"Sins of Our Fathers"	Milena Govich	Amy Berg & Katrina Cabrera Ortega	March 21, 2024	408	3.16
61	9	"Semper Fi"	Carlos Bernard	John Shiban & Katie Letien	April 11, 2024	409	2.85
62	10	"Crossroads"	Jon Cassar	Amy Berg & Davon Briggs	April 18, 2024	410	3.27
63	11	"Redcoat"	Leslie Hope	Liz Sagal	May 2, 2024	411	2.64
64	12	"Goodnight"	Gonzalo Amat	Amy Berg & Will Pascoe	May 9, 2024	412	2.75
65	13	"Stabler's Lament"	Jon Cassar	John Shiban	May 16, 2024	413	2.90

=== Season 5 (2025) ===
- Dean Norris is promoted to series regular as Randall Stabler
- Ainsley Seiger departs in the third episode, "Paranza Dei Bambini".

No. overall	No. in season	Title	Directed by	Written by	Original release date	NBC air date	Prod. code
66	1	"Lost Highway"	Michael Slovis	John Shiban & Amy Berg	April 17, 2025	September 25, 2025	501
67	2	"Dante's Inferno"	Jean de Segonzac	Christopher Meloni & John Shiban	April 17, 2025	October 2, 2025	502
68	3	"Paranza Dei Bambini"	Laura Belsey	Liz Sagal & Davon Briggs	April 24, 2025	October 9, 2025	503
69	4	"Promesse Infrante"	Alex Zakrzewski	Amy Berg & Will Pascoe	May 1, 2025	October 16, 2025	504
70	5	"Lago D'Averno"	Michael Slovis	John Shiban & Liz Sagal	May 8, 2025	October 23, 2025	505
71	6	"Red, White, Black and Blue"	Eriq La Salle	Tim Walsh	May 15, 2025	October 30, 2025	506
72	7	"Beautiful Disaster"	Yangzom Brauen	Amy Berg & Katrina Cabrera Ortega	May 22, 2025	November 6, 2025	507
73	8	"Fail Safe"	Jean de Segonzac	Will Pascoe & John Shiban	May 29, 2025	November 13, 2025	508
74	9	"Off the Books"	Cory Bowles	Teleplay by : Liz Sagal & Davon Briggs; Story by : Matt Olmstead	June 5, 2025	November 20, 2025	509
75	10	"He Was a Stabler"	Peter Stebbings	Teleplay by : Edgar Castillo; Story by : Matt Olmstead & Edgar Castillo	June 12, 2025	November 27, 2025	510
