= NYPD Organized Crime Control Bureau =

Disbanded bureau of New York Police Department

Organized Crime Control Bureau
- Active: November 19, 1971 - March 2016
- Country: United States
- Agency: New York Police Department
- Abbreviation: OCCB

Structure
- Officers: 1,600
- Divisions: Narcotics Division; VICE Enforcement Division; Auto Crime Division; Gang Division; Firearms Division; Investigative Support Division; Organized Crime Investigations Division

The Organized Crime Control Bureau (OCCB) was one of the ten bureaus that formed the New York Police Department. The Bureau was charged with the investigation and prevention of organized crime within New York City. The OCCB was disbanded in March 2016 with all investigative entities moved to the Chief of Detectives' office. The reason for this was the NYPD launching a major reshuffle of its investigative forces, consolidating several of them in an effort to tackle the city's biggest crime problem — violence by gangs and youth crews.

The Organized Crime Control Bureau was headed by Bureau Chief Thomas P. Purtell when it was disbanded.

== History ==
Formed after the Knapp Commission investigations into police corruption, all investigations within the bureau were conducted by specially structured teams, in an effort to reduce the chance of corruption.

Following the 2008 Mumbai attacks, officers from the OCCB were trained in the use of Ruger Mini-14s to provide support to the Emergency Service Unit forming the Critical Incident Response Capacity (CIRC) in case of a similar situation arising in New York City.

== Organization ==
- Narcotics Division
  - Narcotics Boroughs Manhattan North and Manhattan South
  - Narcotics Boroughs Brooklyn North and Brooklyn South
  - Narcotics Borough Bronx
  - Narcotics Borough Queens
  - Narcotics Borough Staten Island
- Vice Enforcement Division (Merged with Narcotics Division in 2011)
- Auto Crime Division
- Gang Division
  - Manhattan Gang Squad
  - Brooklyn North and Brooklyn South Gang Squads
  - Bronx Gang Squad
  - Queens Gang Squad
  - Staten Island Gang Squad
- Firearms Suppression Division
- Investigative Support Division
- Organized Crime Investigation Division
- Field Control Division (Internal Affairs)

== Overview ==
The Organized Crime Control Bureau had numerous units and sub-units that investigated matters such as organized auto larceny rings, unlawful firearms, and prostitution. It was involved in using the Racketeer Influenced and Corrupt Organizations Act (RICO) to search for and destroy organized criminal activities and to seize property and vehicles. The OCCB used undercover police officers to infiltrate various criminal organizations and had been effective against the Italian Mafia, "the Westies" of the Irish Mob, Chinese Triads, and Russian Bratvas organized criminal elements. The OCCB's Joint Organized Crime Task Force worked in cooperation with the Federal Bureau of Investigation's New York Field Division (the largest FBI office in the US).

== See also ==
- New York City Police Department
- Federal Bureau of Investigation
- Law & Order: Organized Crime—Features a fictional version of the NYPD's Organized Crime Control Bureau
