= Rebel (2017 TV series) =

American TV series

- Genre: Police drama Neo-blaxploitation
- Created by: Amani Walker
- Starring: Danielle Moné Truitt; Method Man; Brandon Quinn; Angela Ko; Mykelti Williamson; Giancarlo Esposito
- Country of origin: United States
- Original language: English
- No. of seasons: 1
- No. of episodes: 9

Production
- Executive producers: John Singleton; Dallas Jackson; Randy Huggins; Michael McGahey; Robyn Snyder; Fernando Szew; Kate Lanier
- Running time: 42 minutes
- Production companies: New Deal Productions; 8 Mile Scomi Productions; MarVista Entertainment; Silver Screen Pictures Entertainment; BET Networks

Original release
- Network: BET
- Release: March 28 – May 23, 2017

Rebel is an American police drama television series created by Amani Walker, starring Danielle Moné Truitt. The series premiered on BET on March 28, 2017. The series follows Oakland police officer Rebecca "Rebel" Knight, who after her brother was killed by police, began working as private investigator. In November 2017, BET cancelled the series after one season.

Rebel was picked up to series with eight episode order and a two-hour pilot on April 20, 2016, by BET. John Singleton is executive producer, writer and director.

On June 9, 2016, stage actress Danielle Moné Truitt was cast as lead character, while Giancarlo Esposito, Mykelti Williamson, Method Man, and Brandon Quinn also were cast as series regulars. On November 28, 2017, the series was cancelled after one season.

== Cast ==
=== Main cast ===
- Danielle Moné Truitt as Oakland Police Detective Rebecca "Rebel" Knight. She is a former Army Staff Sergeant and served a tour in Afghanistan. Rebel later quits her job with the force and becomes a P.I. Truitt also plays her character's mother Bernadette in flashbacks.
- Method Man as Terrance "TJ" Jenkins
- Brandon Quinn as Thompson "Mack" McIntyre
- Angela Ko as Cheena
- Mykelti Williamson as Rene Knight, Rebel's father.
- Giancarlo Esposito as Charles Gold

=== Recurring characters ===
- Derek Ray as Jimmy McIntyre
- Michael Masini as Vaughn Bryant
- Jerry Kernion as Captain Frank Hart
- Mandy June Turpin as April Sommerdale
- West Liang as Bryan Markey
- Mikelen Walker as Malik Knight
- Malcolm M. Mays as Brim
- Anthony L. Fernandez as Texas, Diego Perreira
- Adrian Anchondo as Hector
- Anthony Corrales as Eddie Porzo
- Patrick Labyorteaux as Dr. Adam Loyton
- Rebecca Wisocky as Elsa Folster
- Travis Johns as Sam Halderton
- Bree Williamson as Dolores
- Angel Parker as Stella Parker
- Juan Alfonso as Jorge Polanco Jr.
- Julia Cho as Dr. Sara Chan
- Karole Foreman as Claudine Dudley
- Marcuis Harris as Pastor Durod
- Katie A. Keane as Dr. Jennifer Delge
- Tamala Jones as Jackie
- Lauren London as Kim
- Adam Karst as Ahmad Zirnoff
- Tre Hall as Two Man
- Paige Hurd as Simone

== Episodes ==
No.	Title	Directed by	Written by	Original release date	Prod. code	US viewers (millions)
1	"Pilot"	John Singleton	Story by : Amani Walker; Teleplay by : Kate Lanier	March 28, 2017	100	0.705
A renegade cop (Danielle Moné Truitt) has to make a series of tough choices after an on-the-job incident involving the death of her brother, changes her life forever.
2	"Brother's Keeper"	Carl Seaton	Randy Huggins	April 4, 2017	101	0.564
Rebel sets out to disprove the police department's claim about Malik and discovers something she never knew about her brother as well as one of the cops involved in his death.
3	"Chasing Ghosts"	Carl Seaton	A.C. Allen	April 11, 2017	102	0.496
Rebel and TJ team up to help a female Army vet from Iraq who is homeless and on the run for her life.
4	"Black Not Blue"	Salli Richardson	Terri Kopp	April 18, 2017	103	0.440
Mack enlists Rebel to investigate a worker at his mother's assisted living facility. She discovers something surprising about his mother and is reminded of what a good man her ex-partner is, despite the fact that he shot at Malik.
5	"Conceal and Carry"	Salli Richardson	Patrick Moss	April 25, 2017	104	0.478
Rebel takes on a cold case from her time as a detective: the murder of a 17-year-old aspiring artist.
6	"Partners"	Sheldon Candis	A.C. Allen & Natasha Tash Gray	May 2, 2017	105	0.480
Rebel investigates a young church-going boy who robbed a liquor store. Meanwhile, Mr. Knight's old flame, Jackie, returns and stirs up old wounds for Rebel.
7	"Breaking Point"	Sheldon Candis	Randy Huggins & Terri Kopp	May 9, 2017	106	0.455
Rebel and Cheena track a new lead connected to Vaughn Bryant. Meanwhile, at the police department, Charles is faced with a moral dilemma.
8	"Redemption"	Jeffrey W. Byrd	Randy Huggins & Terri Kopp	May 16, 2017	107	0.461
Rebel and Cheena team up with Mack and Jimmy to find a missing Brim.
9	"Just Us"	Jeffrey W. Byrd	Randy Huggins & Terri Kopp	May 23, 2017	108	0.398
With the conspiracy behind Malik’s death finally unraveling, Rebel takes it upon herself to confront his killer. Lauren Lake guest as Rebel's rival.
