= Harsh Times (film) =

2006 film directed by David Ayer

- Theatrical release poster
- Directed by: David Ayer
- Written by: David Ayer
- Produced by: David Ayer; Andrea Sperling
- Starring: Christian Bale; Freddy Rodriguez; Eva Longoria; Terry Crews; Noel Gugliemi
- Cinematography: Steve Mason
- Edited by: Conrad Buff
- Music by: Graeme Revell
- Production companies: Metro-Goldwyn-Mayer; Bauer Martinez Entertainment; Crave Films
- Distributed by: MGM Distribution Co. (United States); Summit Entertainment (International)
- Release dates: September 11, 2005 (Toronto International Film Festival); November 10, 2006 (United States)
- Running time: 116 minutes
- Country: United States
- Language: English
- Budget: $2 million
- Box office: $6 million

Harsh Times is a 2005 American action crime film written and directed by David Ayer in his directorial debut. Set in South Central Los Angeles, the film stars Christian Bale and Freddy Rodriguez. The film was distributed by Metro-Goldwyn-Mayer and Bauer Martinez Entertainment. Ayer says that the film's characters are largely based on the people he knew when he lived in South Central Los Angeles.

== Plot ==
Former U.S. Army Ranger and Global War on Terrorism veteran Jim Davis has PTSD. Jim, determined to marry his Mexican girlfriend Marta, and bring her into the United States to start a life together, returns to Los Angeles, California. He reunites with his best friend Mike Alonzo, whose longtime girlfriend Sylvia is a young attorney "on the warpath" over his failure to get a job. Mike's previous job was outsourced and Sylvia encourages Jim to help Mike find new employment. After failing the psychological profile for a position in the LAPD, Jim gets drunk with Mike and they visit Jim's ex-girlfriend. A fight ensues when her current boyfriend shows up with a group of friends. Jim gets the upper hand and when Mike produces a gun, they rob the men of their possessions, including marijuana and a handgun. Jim leaves messages on Mike's answering machine with different voices, pretending to be companies responding to his resume. The fake callbacks put Sylvia in a good mood and Jim and Mike go to a "paisa" bar to try selling the stolen gun but leave after a potential buyer is killed. Mike is horrified, but Jim is excited by witnessing death again.

When Mike returns home drunk to an upset Sylvia, he plays back the answering machine messages and discovers Jim's voice was inadvertently captured at the end. Sylvia throws Mike out and he stays at Jim's place. Jim gets shortlisted for a position with the Department of Homeland Security, but, after cheating on a urine test, he fails a polygraph question about drug use. His only other prospect is from a government agent working out of Colombia who appreciates Jim's ability to "get things done." Jim accepts, warned not to marry a foreigner, and ordered to report to FLETC.

Mike visits Sylvia with the news he's gotten a real job with a company managed by an old friend. She calms down and they make love. Jim arrives and tells her Mike is coming to Mexico with him for the weekend as a last chance to hang out. Despite Sylvia's opposition, Mike accompanies Jim and Toussant to Mexico. They attend a party where Marta reveals she's pregnant. Jim responds violently, threatening to punch her in the stomach and shoot her in the head. Mike convinces Toussant and Jim it's time to leave. Jim drives home in a belligerent state as Toussant gives him an ultimatum to either seek counseling or he'll cut off all contact until he does.

Jim reveals to Mike he is transporting 20 kilograms of marijuana. When Mike protests, Jim pulls a gun, then breaks down, horrified at what he's becoming. Mike agrees to accompany Jim to the drug deal and realizes one of the buyers is the same man they had earlier robbed. A gunfight erupts and the man is killed. The rest of the buyers plead for their lives, but Jim kills them also. As Jim and Mike escape, a bystander in a nearby house shoots at their car hitting Jim in the back and face and paralyzing him. Jim urges Mike to "step up" and shoot him to end his suffering. They say their goodbyes, and Mike kills Jim. When he reunites with Sylvia they embrace and Mike breaks down.

== Cast ==
- Christian Bale as Jim Davis
- Freddy Rodriguez as Mike Alonzo
- Eva Longoria as Sylvia Alonzo
- Tammy Trull as Marta
- Terry Crews as Darrell
- Samantha Esteban as Letty
- Tania Verafield as Patty
- Noel Gugliemi as "Flaco"
- Chaka Forman as Toussant
- Adriana Millan as Rita
- César García Gómez as "Listo"
- Geo Corvera as "Wilo"
- Blue Mesquita as Leo
- Craig Ricci Shaynak as Agent Doug Gillespie
- Michael Monks as Agent Hollenbreck
- J.K. Simmons as Agent Richards
- Armando Riesco as Alex
- Emilio Rivera as Eddy
- Sonia Iris Lozada as Gracie
- Daniel Edward Mora as Joe "Crazy Joe"
- Anthony "Citric" Campos as Casper
- Abel Soto as Chucky "Lil Chucky"
- Robert Larabee as "Big Shadow"
- Paul Renteria as Ranchero
- Brisa as Lina
- Violeta Monroy as Vicky
- Kenneth Choi as Fujimoto

== Reception ==
Bale's performance was praised. On the review aggregator website Rotten Tomatoes, 48% of 99 critics' reviews are positive, with an average rating of 5.5/10. The website's critical consensus reads, "Despite a dedicated performance by Christian Bale, Harsh Times suffers from a heavy-handed and overly bleak plot." According to Metacritic, which calculated a weighted average score of 56 out of 100 based on 24 critics, the film received "mixed or average" reviews. Audiences polled by CinemaScore gave the film an average grade of "C" on an A+ to F scale.

=== Box office ===
Released November 10, 2006 the film grossed $5,967,038 worldwide.
