= Homefront (2013 film) =

2013 film by Gary Fleder

- Theatrical release poster
- Directed by: Gary Fleder
- Screenplay by: Sylvester Stallone
- Based on: Homefront by Chuck Logan
- Produced by: Sylvester Stallone; Kevin King Templeton; John Thompson
- Starring: Jason Statham; James Franco; Winona Ryder; Kate Bosworth; Rachelle Lefevre; Frank Grillo; Clancy Brown; Izabela Vidovic
- Cinematography: Theo van de Sande
- Edited by: Padraic McKinley
- Music by: Mark Isham
- Production companies: Endgame Entertainment; Millennium Films; Nu Image
- Distributed by: Open Road Films
- Release date: November 27, 2013 (United States)
- Running time: 100 minutes
- Country: United States
- Language: English
- Budget: $22 million
- Box office: $51.7 million

Homefront is a 2013 American action thriller film directed by Gary Fleder and written by Sylvester Stallone, who also produced the film with Kevin King Templeton and John Thompson. The film, which is based on the novel of the same name by Chuck Logan, stars Jason Statham, James Franco, Winona Ryder, and Kate Bosworth. In the film, Phil Broker, a retired Drug Enforcement Administration (DEA) agent, leads a peaceful life with his daughter Maddy, but trouble ensues as Broker and Maddy get entangled with Gator Bodine, a crime boss, due to a school bullying incident.

Filming began on October 1, 2012, in New Orleans, Louisiana. Homefront was released on November 27, 2013.

== Plot ==
Phil Broker, a DEA agent, leads a raid on a methamphetamine lab owned by Danny "T" Turrie, a biker gang boss who leads the Outcasts MC. Danny T is arrested, but his son is killed when police shoot him. Broker retires from the agency as a result and moves to Rayville, Louisiana, with his daughter, Maddy, as that was where her deceased mother grew up. One day, Maddy defends herself from a bully, Teddy, and Broker is called to her school. Teddy's mother, Cassie, instigates a fight between her unassertive husband, Jimmy, and Broker, which Broker wins easily.

An enraged Cassie asks her brother and Teddy's uncle Morgan "Gator" Bodine, a crime boss running a meth lab in the backwoods, to intimidate Broker. Gator sneaks into their house, kidnaps Maddy's cat, Luther, and finds old DEA personnel files and Broker's passport, discovering that Broker was responsible for Danny T's arrest.

Hoping to expand his influence, Gator and his girlfriend Sheryl tip off Danny T, who sends his club members led by Cyrus Hanks to kill Broker and Maddy. Broker smooths over the situation with Teddy's family by having Maddy invite Teddy to her birthday party and tensions between the two families ease. Broker's DEA contacts warn him about Gator. Broker heads to Gator's meth lab and sets traps, but is subdued and tortured by Gator's thugs. He manages to defeat them and recover Luther. Before Maddy and he can leave town, Cyrus and his crew arrive with guns. Broker kills them all.

During the firefight, Sheryl kidnaps Maddy, who uses her dad's cell phone to call him. From her descriptions, he realizes that Maddy has been taken to Gator's meth lab. Gator lashes out at Sheryl for kidnapping Maddy and getting him involved, as he wanted to keep his name out of the mess. Cassie and Jimmy arrive; horrified to find Maddy there, she confronts Gator and accidentally sets off Broker's traps, causing the building to explode and destroying his meth lab. Gator accidentally shoots Cassie and flees with Maddy in his truck, with Broker in pursuit.

When Broker crashes his car, Gator prepares to shoot him, but is distracted by Maddy, who begs for mercy. Broker thrashes Gator, but lets him live rather than kill him in front of Maddy. Gator and Sheryl are arrested, while Cassie is taken to the hospital.

Later, Broker visits Danny T in prison, letting him know that he will be around when Danny T is eventually released.

== Cast ==
- Jason Statham as Phil Broker, a former DEA agent seeking a secluded life with his daughter
- James Franco as Morgan "Gator" Bodine, a local meth dealer, Cassie and Jimmy's older brother and Teddy's uncle seeking to expand his empire
- Winona Ryder as Sheryl Marie Mott, Gator's girlfriend
- Kate Bosworth as Cassie Bodine Klum, Gator's antagonizing younger sister, Jimmy's wife and Teddy's mother
- Rachelle Lefevre as Susan Hetch, the school psychiatrist
- Frank Grillo as Cyrus Hanks, a ruthless biker leading the Outcasts in Danny "T's" stead
- Clancy Brown as Keith Rodrigue, sheriff of Richland Parish
- Izabela Vidovic as Maddy Broker, Phil's daughter
- Omar Benson Miller as Teedo, Phil's fellow construction co-worker
- Austin Craig as Teddy Klum, Cassie and Jimmy's son, Gator's nephew and a school bully who instigated a fight with Maddy
- Marcus Hester as Jimmy Klum, Cassie's husband, Teddy's father and Gator's brother-in-law
- Chuck Zito as Danny "T" Turrie, president of the Outcast MC New Orleans charter, whom Broker busted for meth cooking and dealing
- Linds Edwards as Jojo Turrie, Danny "T's" junkie son
- Pruitt Taylor Vince as Werks, an Outcast biker connected to Sheryl

== Production ==
Sylvester Stallone wrote the script, which is based on the novel of the same name by Chuck Logan. The film was originally intended to have Stallone in the lead role Phil Broker, but Stallone stayed on as the producer and passed on the lead role to Jason Statham. Early in development, Stallone originally conceived the script as a sequel to the Rambo films until it was shelved for a decade.

== Reception ==
=== Box office ===
Homefront grossed $20.2 million in the United States and Canada and $31.5 million in other territories, for a worldwide total of $51.7 million, against a budget of $22 million. It opened at number five at the US box office in its first weekend and spent its first three weekends in the top 10 at the US box office.

=== Critical response ===
On the review aggregator website Rotten Tomatoes, 42% of 114 critics' reviews are positive, with an average rating of 5.0/10. The website's consensus reads: "While it boasts a capable cast, the disappointingly dull Homefront hearkens back to classic action thrillers without adding anything to the genre." Metacritic, which uses a weighted average, assigned the film a score of 40 out of 100, based on 35 critics, indicating "mixed or average" reviews. Audiences polled by CinemaScore gave the film an average grade of "B" on an A+ to F scale.

Scott Foundas of Variety notes the reliable presence of Statham, but blames director Gary Fleder for "making an incoherent jumble of most of the action scenes". He calls Kate Bosworth's performance the film's "greatest surprise", and James Franco's performance as its "biggest disappointment". Foundas calls the film "surprisingly joyless" and "less than the sum of its parts."
