= Craig Gore (screenwriter) =

American screenwriter and television producer

- Born: Myrtle Beach, South Carolina
- Citizenship: American
- Education: Columbia College Chicago (bachelor's)
- Occupations: Screenwriter; television producer
- Known for: Chicago P.D.; S.W.A.T.; Law & Order: Organized Crime

Craig Gore (born 1973) is an American screenwriter and television producer. Gore’s career has spanned over fifteen years, during which he has written and produced multiple hours of television and sold numerous pilots to studios.

== Early life and education ==
Gore was born in Myrtle Beach, South Carolina, and grew up on a military base in North Carolina. Raised by his father, Gore faced significant challenges in his youth, including his father’s incarceration for manslaughter when Gore was 13.

During his teenage years, Gore was involved in criminal activities, including safecracking, auto theft, and robbery, which led to his imprisonment at the age of 18. During his time in prison, he worked in the library and became an avid reader, sparking his interest in writing.

After his release, pursued higher education, earning a bachelor's degree in Fiction Writing from Columbia College Chicago in 1999.

== Career ==
After graduating from college, Gore then moved to Los Angeles to pursue a writing career. In 2008, he sold his first television pilot, Stray Bullets, to Fox Television Studios. Over the next few years, he sold several more original pilots before securing a role as executive story editor on the series Defiance in 2011.

In 2013, Gore was hired as a staff member for NBC’s Chicago P.D., serving as a co-executive producer during the show’s first four seasons. In 2017, he became a head writer and executive producer for CBS's S.W.A.T., a position he held for three seasons.

In 2019, Gore co-wrote the pilot for D.E.A., a procedural drama developed with David Ayer under Ayer’s Cedar Park Entertainment. The project was set to be co-produced by Entertainment One and Fox Entertainment but was ultimately not produced due to the COVID-19 pandemic.

In July 2021, Gore was hired by Joseph Sikora to adapt the book Everybody Pays: Two Men, One Murder, and the Price of Truth, which follows the true story of the hitman Harry Aleman.

In 2022, Gore served as co-creator and co-showrunner for the MBC Studios series S.E.F., following the lives and cases of a Saudi Arabian special forces team, which remains in development.

Gore is currently serving as executive producer on Donald Goines: The Godfather of Street Lit, a documentary about the life, literary legacy, and unsolved murder of the novelist Donald Goines.

== Controversy ==
In 2020, a Facebook Friend of Gore's took a screenshot of Gore holding a prop rifle from S.W.A.T. and posted it to Twitter with a caption threatening to shoot looters in Los Angeles, which resulted in him being fired from his role as co-executive producer of Law & Order: Organized Crime.

In November 2020, Gore won a wrongful termination lawsuit against NBC, with both parties settling in June 2021.

In 2021, Gore sued the "Facebook Friend" for defamation, who admitted in Los Angeles Superior Court that him posting the picture online was "all a joke".
