= Law & Order: Organized Crime =

American television series (2021–2025)

- Genre: Police procedural; Crime thriller
- Created by: Dick Wolf; Ilene Chaiken; Matt Olmstead
- Developed by: Warren Leight; Julie Martin
- Showrunners: Matt Olmstead; Ilene Chaiken; Barry O'Brien; Bryan Goluboff; Sean Jablonski; David Graziano; John Shiban
- Starring: Christopher Meloni; Danielle Moné Truitt; Tamara Taylor; Ainsley Seiger; Dylan McDermott; Nona Parker Johnson; Brent Antonello; Rick Gonzalez; Dean Norris
- Narrated by: Steven Zirnkilton
- Theme music composer: Mike Post
- Opening theme: "Theme of Law & Order: Organized Crime"
- Composer: Ruth Barrett
- Country of origin: United States
- Original language: English
- No. of seasons: 5
- No. of episodes: 75 (list of episodes)

Production
- Executive producers: Dick Wolf; John Shiban; Mike Slovis; Ilene Chaiken; Arthur W. Forney; Peter Jankowski; Fred Berner; Terry Miller; Christopher Meloni
- Cinematography: Jim Denault; Jack Donnelly
- Running time: 40–49 minutes
- Production companies: Wolf Entertainment; Universal Television

Original release
- Network: NBC
- Release: April 1, 2021 – November 20, 2025
- Network: Peacock
- Release: April 17 – June 12, 2025

Related
- Law & Order franchise

Law & Order: Organized Crime is an American crime drama television series that premiered on NBC on April 1, 2021, running until June 12, 2025, with season five moving to Peacock. The seventh series in the Law & Order franchise and a spin-off of Law & Order and Law & Order: Special Victims Unit, the series stars Christopher Meloni as Elliot Stabler, reprising his role from SVU. The show features a "single-arc" storyline that takes multiple episodes to resolve.

The first season premiered on April 1, 2021, and was renewed for a second season originally comprising 24 episodes, though only 22 were produced. The second season premiered on September 23, 2021, and the series was renewed in May 2022 for a third season, which premiered on September 22, 2022. In April 2023, the series was renewed for a fourth season, which premiered on January 18, 2024. On April 25, 2024, it was announced that the series was renewed for a fifth season and would move to Peacock. The fifth season premiered its first episode on NBC after a two-part crossover event between Law & Order and Law & Order: SVU. The first two episodes were already available to stream on April 17, 2025, on Peacock.

On July 28, 2025, it was reported that the show's fifth season will re-air in its original Thursday 10 p.m. slot on NBC starting on September 25, 2025, and that NBC could decide on whether to pick it up for a sixth season based on its ratings. In April 2026, the series was canceled after five seasons.

== Premise ==
In the nation's largest city, the vicious and violent members of the underworld are hunted by the detectives of the Organized Crime Control Bureau. These are their stories.

— Opening narration for seasons 1–4 spoken by Steven Zirnkilton

The series centers on Law & Order: Special Victims Unit character Elliot Stabler, a veteran detective who returns to the NYPD in New York following his wife's murder. Stabler joins the Organized Crime Task Force, led by Sergeant Ayanna Bell.

== Cast and characters ==
=== Main ===
- Christopher Meloni as Detective 1st Grade Elliot Stabler, a former Manhattan Special Victims Unit detective who returns to New York after retiring from the police department several years earlier. He joins a task force within the Organized Crime Control Bureau to find his wife's killers and becomes its second-in-command.
- Danielle Moné Truitt as Sergeant Ayanna Bell, squad supervisor of the OCCB task force and Stabler's current direct superior and partner
- Tamara Taylor as Prof. Angela Wheatley (seasons 1–2), a former math professor at Columbia University, ex-wife of Richard Wheatley, and a suspect in the hit ordered on Kathy Stabler
- Ainsley Seiger as Detective 2nd Grade Jet Slootmaekers (seasons 1–5), a former independent hacker who is recruited to the OCCB task force on Stabler's recommendation. She was requalified as an NYPD officer to work with the OCCB task force. In season 3 episode 16 ("Chinatown"), she is promoted from Detective 3rd Grade to Detective 2nd Grade. In season 5, she leaves the OCCB task force to work with the FBI.
- Dylan McDermott as Richard Wheatley (né Sinatra) (seasons 1–2), son of notorious mobster Manfredi Sinatra, now a businessman and owner of an online pharmaceutical company who leads a second life as a crime boss, and was a suspect in the murder of Stabler's wife. He was presumed murdered by Angela after she discovered that Wheatley murdered their son Richie.
- Nona Parker Johnson as Detective 3rd Grade Carmen "Nova" Riley (season 2), an undercover narcotics detective working under Brewster's command to infiltrate the Marcy Killers. She retires from the NYPD and leaves New York after the murder of the gang's leader Preston Webb.
- Brent Antonello as Detective 2nd Grade Jamie Whelan (season 3), a detective with the OCCB. Formerly at the Belle Harbor, Queens Precinct. In the season 3 finale, he is shot and paralyzed by Kyle Wilkie and later dies in the hospital.
- Rick Gonzalez as Detective 2nd Grade Roberto "Bobby" Reyes (seasons 3–5), an undercover detective with the OCCB
- Dean Norris as Randall Stabler (season 5; recurring season 4), Stabler's older brother and a real-estate developer based in Florida

=== Recurring ===
- Ben Chase as Detective 1st Grade Freddie Washburn (season 1), a detective from the Narcotics unit recruited to the OCCB task force, and Bell's former senior partner in Narcotics
- Michael Rivera as Detective 2nd Grade Diego Morales (season 1), a detective originally from the Gun Violence Suppression Division recruited to the OCCB task force
- Shauna Harley as Pilar Wheatley (season 1; guest season 2), Richard's current wife
- Nick Creegan as Richard "Richie" Wheatley Jr. (season 1; guest season 2), Richard and Prof. Angela Wheatley's older son, who aspires to follow in the family business
- Jaylin Fletcher as Ryan Wheatley (season 1), Richard's and Pilar's son
- Christina Marie Karis as Dana Wheatley (season 1; guest season 2), Richard and Prof. Angela Wheatley's only daughter who assists her father in his crimes
- Ibrahim Renno as Izak Bekher (season 1), an Israeli criminal with combatant experience at the IDF
- Charlotte Sullivan as Detective 3rd Grade Gina Cappelletti (season 1), an undercover detective assigned to the OCCB task force
- Autumn Mirassou as Maureen "Mau" Stabler, Stabler's oldest child
- Allison Siko as Kathleen Stabler, Stabler's second daughter
- Jeffrey Scaperrotta as Richard "Dickie" Stabler, Stabler's oldest son and Lizze's twin brother
- Kaitlyn Davidson as Elizabeth "Lizzie" Stabler, Stabler's youngest daughter and Dickie's twin sister
- Nicky Torchia as Elliot "Eli" Stabler Jr., Stabler's youngest child
- Michael Trotter as Joseph Stabler Jr. (seasons 4–5), Stabler's younger brother
- Keren Dukes as Denise Bullock (seasons 1–3), the ex-wife of Ayanna Bell, and birthmother of Jake, their shared son
- Wendy Moniz as ADA Anne Frasier (seasons 1–2; guest season 5), the prosecutor on the Wheatley and K-O case
- Daniel Oreskes as Lieutenant Marv Moennig (seasons 1–2), the commanding officer of the OCCB task force
- Nicholas Baroudi as Joey Raven (season 1), the owner of the Seven Knights club
- Diany Rodriguez as ADA Maria Delgado (season 1), an ADA who formerly worked with the task force
- Steve Harris as Ellsworth Lee (season 1), Angela Wheatley's attorney
- Mike Cannon as Detective 3rd Grade Carlos Maldonado (season 2), a detective formerly under Brewster's command, but who now works under Bell's
- Rachel Lin as Detective 1st Grade Victoria Cho (season 2), a detective formerly under Brewster's command, but who now works under Bell's
- Lolita Davidovich as Flutura Briscu (season 2), the wife of Albanian mobster and gang leader, Albi Briscu
- Antino Crowley-Kamenwati as Hugo Bankole (season 2; guest season 1), a VP in the Marcy Killers organization
- Izabela Vidovic as Rita Lasku (season 2; guest season 4), a waitress who was trafficked by the Kosta Organization
- Caroline Lagerfelt as Agniezjka "Agnes" Bogdani (season 2), Reggie Bogdani's mother and Albi Briscu's sister
- Robin Lord Taylor as Sebastian "Constantine" McClane (season 2), a notorious hacker and high-security convict who escaped prison
- Gregg Henry as Edmund Ross (season 2), a businessman who was involved in a sex trafficking ring with the Kosta Organization
- Wesam Keesh as Adam "Malachi" Mintock (season 2), a hacker who created an app for the Kosta Organization, now forced to assist the Organized Crime Task Force in order to avoid prosecution
- Jen Jacob as Bridget Donnelly (season 2), Frank's second wife (whom he cheats), and mother of their son, Elliott, named after Stabler
- James Cromwell as Miles Darman (season 2), a neighbor of Stabler who was hired by Wheatley to charm Bernadette
- Liris Crosse as Officer Tanisha Carling (season 2), a member of the Brotherhood
- Eddie Yu as Officer David Yoshida (season 2), a member of the Brotherhood
- Justin Grace as Ron Bolton (season 2), a member of the Brotherhood
- Sebastian Arroyo as Officer Jessie Santos (season 2), a member of the Brotherhood
- Patrick Murney as Officer Scott Parnell, a member of the Brotherhood
- Tim Ransom as Officer Stanwood (season 2), a member of the Brotherhood
- Wass Stevens as Dominic Russo (season 3), an enforcer associated with Vincent Bishop and Teddy Silas
- Kevin Corrigan as Vincent Bishop (season 3), a former construction foreman associated with Teddy Silas
- Michael Drayer as Kenny Kyle (season 3), a career criminal and a suspect in the murder of Henry Cole
- Janel Moloney as Deputy Inspector Lillian Goldfarb (season 3)
- Christopher Cassarino as Vaughn Davis (season 3), a gang leader who recruited fake cops to rob and assault civilians. He is also the foster brother of Bobby Reyes, Manny Rivera, and Dante Scott.
- JR Lemon as Deputy Inspector Ray Thurman (season 3)
- Pooch Hall as Dante Scott (season 3), a recently released drug dealer who joins a criminal gang run by Vaughn Davis. He is also the foster brother of Vaughn Davis, Bobby Reyes, and Manny Rivera.
- Daniel Jenkins as Leonard Baker (season 3), the former sexually abusive foster father of Bobby Reyes, Vaughn Davis, Dante Scott, and Manny Rivera
- Ayelet Zurer as Agent Tia Leonetti (season 3), an agent with Italian police
- Mark Ivanir as Michael Abramov (season 3), an Israeli criminal who operates from Eastern Europe, and smuggles gold and sweatshop workers into the United States
- Tate Ellington as Professor Kyle Vargas (seasons 4–5), an artificial intelligence expert who joined the Organized Crime Control Bureau
- Kiaya Scott as Becky (seasons 4–5), Eli's girlfriend and mother of their son, Owen
- Abubakr Ali as Detective Samir "Sam" Bashir (season 4), a detective with the Organized Crime Control Bureau
- Nicole Shalhoub as Captain Nazanin Shah (season 4), the commanding officer of the Hate Crimes Division
- Will Janowitz as Eric Bonner (season 4), the son of Judge Clay Bonner and the brother of Chief Meredith Bonner, who became a serial killer
- Stephen Lang as Angus Boone (season 4)
- Lois Smith as Doris Boone (season 4)
- Garland Scott as Sergeant Hunt, Eli's training officer (season 5)

=== Special guest stars ===
- Ellen Burstyn as Bernadette "Bernie" Stabler (season 2–5), Stabler's mother
- Michael Raymond-James as Jon Kosta (season 2), the founder and leader of the Albanian mafia called the Kosta Organization
- Vinnie Jones as Albi Briscu (season 2), an Albanian gangster who is the last remaining member of his organization from the old country. He serves as Jon Kosta's underboss
- Dash Mihok as Reggie Bogdani (season 2), Albi Briscu's nephew who serves as Stabler's boss during his time undercover infiltrating the Kosta organization
- Guillermo Díaz as Sergeant/Lieutenant William "Bill" Brewster (season 2), the sergeant of a Narcotics task force and was previously Ayanna Bell's boss before she was transferred to the Organized Crime Control Bureau. He is promoted to lieutenant and takes over as commanding officer following Lieutenant Moennig's departure.
- Ron Cephas Jones as Congressman Leon Kilbride (season 2), a politician who fosters connections and seems to have one with the Wheatleys. He is also the mentor of Preston Webb and is affiliated with Marcy Killers.
- Mykelti Williamson as Preston Webb (season 2), a construction magnate who is actually a dangerous crime kingpin in charge of the Marcy Killers organization; he is affiliated with Congressman Kilbride. He is killed in the season 2 finale.
- Jennifer Beals as Cassandra Webb (season 2), the wife of Preston Webb
- Denis Leary as Frank Donnelly (season 2), a longtime member of the NYPD who has a history with Stabler. Donnelly is revealed to be the leader of The Brotherhood, a crime syndicate of dirty cops within the NYPD. After the Brotherhood is uncovered and arrested at the end of the second season, Donnelly commits suicide to avoid disgrace and prison.
- Gus Halper as Teddy Silas (season 3), a construction foreman who gets involved in a murder investigation run by the OCCB task force. He is the husband of Pearl Serrano and the son of Robert Silas. He later helps OCCB to try to take down the New Westies organization, but he leaves in the middle of their investigation, and he gets arrested once again.
- Camilla Belle as Pearl Serrano (season 3), the wife of Teddy Silas
- Jennifer Ehle as Chief Meredith Bonner (season 4), police chief of the town of Westbrook, daughter of Clay Bonner and sister of Eric Bonner
- Keith Carradine as Judge Clay Bonner (season 4), judge of the town of Westbrook, father of Meredith and Eric Bonner
- Jason Patric as Detective Tim McKenna (season 5), Stabler’s former partner on the Anti-Crime Task Force

=== Crossover stars from Law & Order: Special Victims Unit ===
- Mariska Hargitay as Captain Olivia Benson (seasons 1–3, 5)
- Peter Scanavino as Assistant District Attorney Dominick Carisi Jr. (seasons 1, 3–5)
- Demore Barnes as Deputy Chief Christian Garland (season 1)
- Ice-T as Sergeant Fin Tutuola (seasons 2–3)
- Raúl Esparza as Defense Attorney (Former ADA) Rafael Barba (season 2)
- Dann Florek as Former Captain Donald Cragen (seasons 2, 4)
- Octavio Pisano as Detective Joe Velasco (seasons 2–3)
- Kelli Giddish as Detective/Sergeant Amanda Rollins (season 3)
- Molly Burnett as Detective Grace Muncy (season 3)
- Tamara Tunie as Dr. Melinda Warner (seasons 4–5)

=== Crossover stars from Law & Order ===
- Jeffrey Donovan as Detective Frank Cosgrove (season 3)
- Mehcad Brooks as Detective Jalen Shaw (seasons 3)
- Camryn Manheim as Lieutenant Kate Dixon (season 3)

== Episodes ==
Season	Episodes	Originally released		
Season	Episodes	First released	Last released	Network
1	8	April 1, 2021	June 3, 2021	NBC
2	22	September 23, 2021	May 19, 2022	NBC
3	22	September 22, 2022	May 18, 2023	NBC
4	13	January 18, 2024	May 16, 2024	NBC
5	10	April 17, 2025	June 12, 2025	NBC/Peacock

== Production ==
=== Development ===
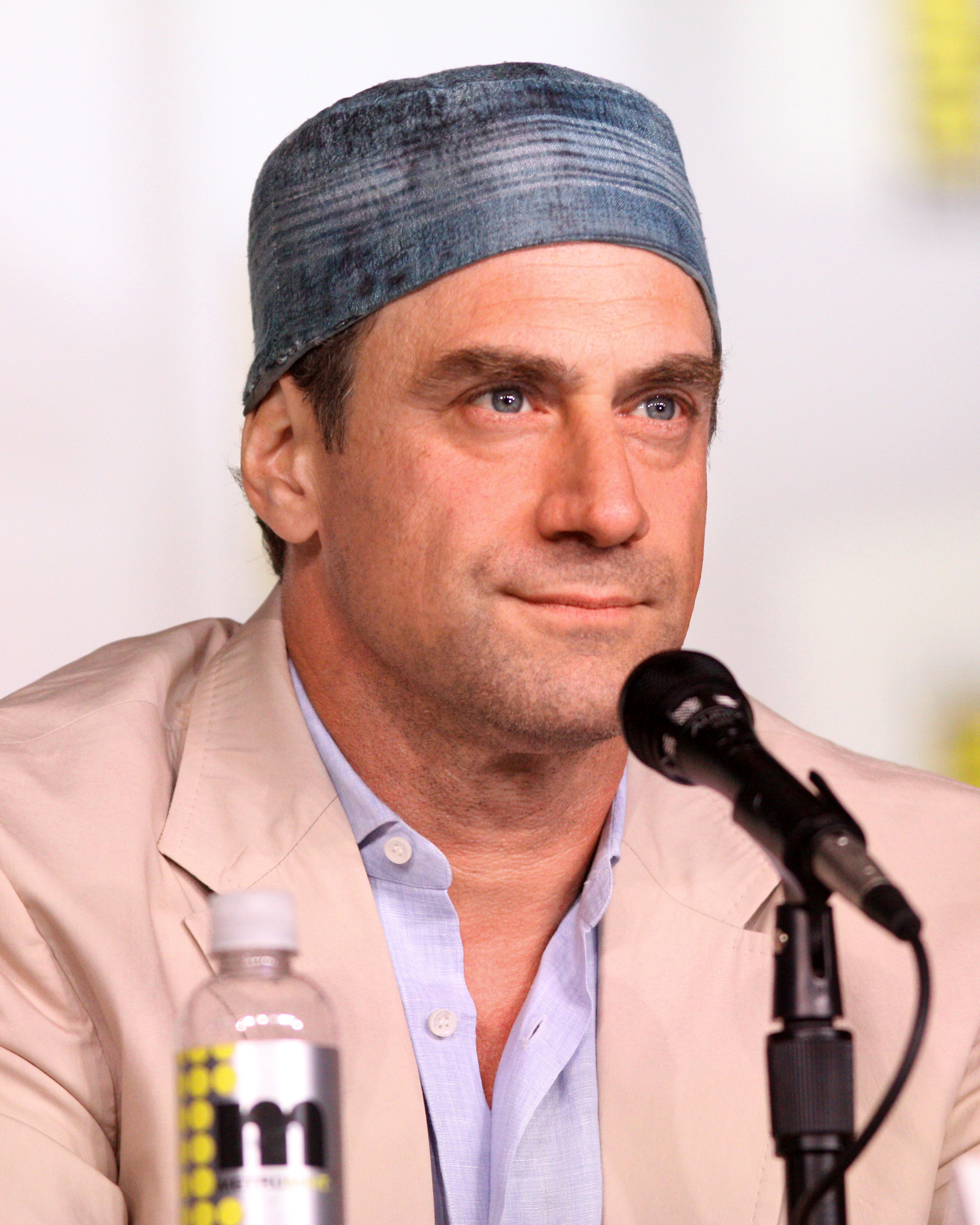
After working on Special Victims Unit, Christopher Meloni returned to the Law & Order franchise to reprise his role as Elliot Stabler.

In March 2020, NBC had given a 13-episode order to a new crime drama starring Meloni as his character from Law & Order: Special Victims Unit, Elliot Stabler. Dick Wolf, Arthur W. Forney, and Peter Jankowski, serve as the executive producers, with Matt Olmstead being looked at as showrunner and writer. The series came following Wolf's five-year deal with Universal Television, which will serve as the series' production company along with Wolf Entertainment.

The series was originally planned to be set up in the twenty-first season finale of Law & Order: Special Victims Unit, with Stabler's wife and son returning. The episode would also have revealed the whereabouts of the Stabler family following Meloni's departure as the character in season twelve. When asked whether or not the storyline would instead happen in the twenty-second season premiere, Law & Order: Special Victims Unit showrunner Warren Leight said that "it's pretty clear that Elliot will be in the SVU season opener". Craig Gore was set to be a writer for the series, but was fired by Wolf on June 2, 2020, for controversial Facebook posts about looters and the curfew put in place in Los Angeles due to protests about the murder of George Floyd. Gore had listed himself as co-executive producer on the series on his Facebook profile, but Meloni announced Olmstead would be the showrunner for the series, not Gore. The same day, the series title was revealed to be Law & Order: Organized Crime. The first teaser for the series was released during the 30 Rock: A One-Time Special on July 17. In July, Meloni stated he had not yet seen a script, and the writers were still working on the story. By October, Olmstead had stepped down as showrunner, and he was later replaced by Ilene Chaiken in December.

In February 2022, Chaiken was replaced as showrunner by Barry O'Brien. In May 2021, NBC renewed the series for a second season, which premiered on September 23, 2021. In May 2022, NBC renewed the series for a third season, which premiered on September 22, 2022. Bryan Goluboff was appointed showrunner for the third season, but left after three months, and was replaced by Sean Jablonski, who then also left due to "creative differences", and David Graziano took over for the final episodes of the third season. In April 2023, NBC renewed the series for a fourth season that premiered on January 18, 2024, with John Shiban as showrunner. Shiban departed during production of the fifth season in fall 2024, marking the sixth change in showrunners over the show's five seasons. On April 16, 2026, it was announced the series had been canceled after five seasons.

=== Casting ===
During the production of the series, in July 2020, Meloni announced Mariska Hargitay would make a guest appearance as her character from Law & Order: Special Victims Unit, Olivia Benson. On January 27, 2021, Dylan McDermott had been cast in the series, with Tamara Taylor, Danielle Moné Truitt, Ainsley Seiger, Jaylin Fletcher, Charlotte Sullivan, Nick Creegan, and Ben Chase joining the following month. At the end of March, it was reported that Nicky Torchia, Michael Rivera, and Ibrahim Renno would appear in recurring roles. In March, it was revealed that some of the actors who played members of the Stabler family as far back as 1999, in episodes of Law & Order: Special Victims Unit, would appear in the new series, including Allison Siko as daughter Kathleen and Jeffrey Scaperrotta as son Dickie, while Isabel Gillies appeared as soon to be murdered wife Kathy in the Law & Order: Special Victims Unit episode that sees the Stablers return to New York, setting the scene for the new series. In August, Ron Cephas Jones, Vinnie Jones, Lolita Davidovich, Mykelti Williamson, Guillermo Díaz and Dash Mihok joined the cast in recurring roles for the second season. In early 2022, Jennifer Beals and Denis Leary joined the cast in recurring roles. In July 2022, Rick Gonzalez and Brent Antonello joined the cast for the third season. In August 2022, Camilla Belle and Gus Halper joined the cast for the third season.

=== Filming ===
Like Law & Order: Special Victims Unit, the series is filmed on location in New York. Production was set to begin on the series in August 2020, but was announced in September that the series was the only one produced by Wolf Entertainment to not be given a start date for production. The series later began production on January 27, 2021, during the COVID-19 pandemic, with Meloni and Hargitay sharing pictures on set. In the following months, the production on the series had been halted twice due to two positive COVID-19 tests; despite the halt, it was announced the series would still premiere on the same date.

On July 19, 2022, Johnny Pizarro, a crew member working on the show, was fatally shot while filming was underway for the third season. Filming on the fifth season, set to air on Peacock, began in August 2024.

== Release ==
=== Broadcast ===
On June 16, 2020, it was announced the series would air on Thursdays on NBC at 10 p.m. Eastern Time, the former timeslot of Law & Order: Special Victims Unit, with the latter moving up an hour to 9 p.m. The series was the only new series on NBC's fall lineup at the moment for the 2020–21 television season. In August 2020, the series was pushed back to 2021 and on February 4, 2021, it was announced the series would premiere on April 1, 2021, as part of a two-hour crossover with Law & Order: Special Victims Unit. The first season consists of eight episodes. The series moved from broadcast to streaming for season 5, with NBC airing the premiere episode on April 17, 2025 after the Law & Order and SVU crossover.

=== Streaming ===
The series is available on the streaming service, Peacock, with episodes being released on the service a week after they air on NBC for the service's free tier, and the next day for the paid tier. In 2024, it was announced the series will move permanently to streaming on Peacock for season 5 premiering on April 17, 2025.

=== International ===
In Canada, Organized Crime airs on Citytv in simulcast with NBC, unlike past American-set Law & Order series which have all aired on CTV. Because of commitments to other Thursday night programming like Grey's Anatomy, CTV aired the direct lead-in episode of SVU out of simulcast in the 10:00 p.m. ET/PT timeslot, airing directly against the premiere of its spin-off on Citytv. In 2021, all Law & Order series moved to Citytv, airing simulcast with NBC. Like in the United States, the series moved to Citytv's streaming service Citytv+ for season 5, releasing new episodes on the same day as Peacock, but unlike NBC, which aired the first episode after SVU, Citytv did not due to commitments to Law & Order Toronto: Criminal Intent. In Australia, Organized Crime airs on the Nine Network on Monday night timeslot starting April 12, 2021.

=== Home media ===
The first two seasons have been released on DVD for Region 4, with all yet to be released for Region 1.

DVD Name	Ep#	Release dates		
DVD Name	Ep#	Region 1	Region 2	Region 4
Season One	8	N/A	N/A	December 8, 2021
Season Two	22	N/A	N/A	November 22, 2022

== Ratings ==
Viewership and ratings per season of Law & Order: Organized Crime
Season	Timeslot (ET)	Episodes	First aired		Last aired		TV season	Viewership rank	Avg. viewers (millions)	Avg. 18–49 rating
Season	Timeslot (ET)	Episodes	Date	Viewers (millions)	Date	Viewers (millions)	TV season	Viewership rank	Avg. viewers (millions)	Avg. 18–49 rating
1	Thursday 10:00 p.m. (Note: The second episode of the second season aired outside of its regular timeslot, at Thursday 9 p.m. The third season premiered outside its timeslot, at Thursday 8 p.m.)	8	April 1, 2021	7.86	June 3, 2021	4.02	2020–21	21	7.83	1.5
2	Thursday 10:00 p.m.	22	September 23, 2021	4.18	May 19, 2022	3.37	2021–22	45	5.51	1.0
3	Thursday 10:00 p.m.	22	September 22, 2022	4.97	May 18, 2023	4.00	2022–23	39	5.49	TBD
4	Thursday 10:00 p.m.	13	January 18, 2024	3.90	May 16, 2024	2.90	2023–24	40	5.18	TBD

== Reception ==
The show was well received by long time fans of the franchise, especially those eager to see Olivia Benson and Elliot Stabler back on screen together. Upon the series premiere, TVLine wrote, "It's rare that a television event lives up to its hype. But thanks to Meloni and Hargitay, Elliot Stabler's big return to the Law & Order universe really did... From the first moment that Hargitay and Meloni shared a scene, they were right back in it. Therefore, so were we."

Stacy Lambe of E! Online noted that the Benson-Stabler reunion was "worth the wait, with the franchise delivering some unexpected twists and turns as well as plenty of heartfelt moments."

Variety's Daniel D'Addario called the premiere "juicily entertaining", and Decider's Joel Keller wrote, "Law & Order: Organized Crime isn't 'classic' L&O, but it's got an intriguing continuing storyline and two fantastic leads... it's a story that looks to be really compelling to watch. Much of that, of course, is due to Meloni's incendiary acting.

The Los Angeles Times wrote about the fan reaction to the premiere, saying "the reaction to Stabler’s highly anticipated comeback was, predictably, intense—and mostly communicated through various GIFs and memes of people crying, screaming and collapsing on the floor. So yeah. That's where the Law & Order fandom is at right now.
