= Danielle Moné Truitt =

American actress (born 1981)

- Born: March 2, 1981 (age 45); Sacramento, California, U.S.
- Education: Sacramento State University
- Occupation: Actress
- Years active: 2005–present
- Known for: Deputy; Law & Order: Organized Crime
- Spouse: Kelvin Truitt (divorced)
- Children: 2

Danielle Moné Truitt (born March 2, 1981) is an American actress. She is known for her roles in BET's television series Rebel and Fox's television series Deputy. She later starred as NYPD Sergeant Ayanna Bell on NBC's crime drama Law & Order: Organized Crime (2021–2025), having first made her debut on Special Victims Unit.

== Biography ==
Truitt was born and raised in Sacramento, California. She was Miss Black Sacramento 2000 and studied theatre and dance at Sacramento State, from which she graduated in 2004. She briefly worked in banking after graduation, before joining a local theater company. In addition to starring in Rebel and Organized Crime, she is a two-time Ovation Awards nominee (The Mountaintop, Dreamgirls) and received an NAACP Theatre Award nomination for The Mountaintop.

== Personal life ==
Truitt was married to Kelvin Truitt as of 2007, but the marriage ended in 2021. She has two children.

== Filmography ==
=== Film ===
Year	Title	Role	Notes
2005	Fugitive Hunter	Patrice	
2009	Benny Bliss and the Disciples of Greatness	Choir Singer	
2009	The Princess and the Frog	Georgia (voice)	Also the performance model for Tiana.
2009	See Dick Run	Helen	
2010	Thespians	Danielle	Short
2013	Stolen Moments	Erin	
2014	ETXR	Kay	
2020	Junebug	Junie	Short
2020	Moar Like Goner, Amirite?	Cynthia	Short

=== Television ===
Year	Title	Role	Notes
2014	Super Fun Night	Miss T	Episode: "Li'l Big Kim"
2015	Mulaney	Girl #2	Episode: "Power Moves"
2017	Face Value	Herself	Episode: "Earthquake vs. Danielle Truit"
2017	Rebel	Rebecca "Rebel" Knight	Main Cast
2019	Snowfall	Sheila	Episode: "The Bottoms"
2020	Deputy	Charlie Minnick	Main Cast
2020	Chicago Med	Dr. Angela Douglas	Episode: "Those Things Hidden in Plain Sight"
2021–22	Law & Order: Special Victims Unit	Sergeant Ayanna Bell	Recurring Cast: Season 23, Guest: Season 24
2021–2025	Law & Order: Organized Crime	Sergeant Ayanna Bell	Main Cast

=== Video games ===
Year	Title	Role	Notes
2009	The Princess and the Frog	Georgia	
