= Ainsley Seiger =

American actress (born 1998)

- Ainsley Seiger at the Deauville American Film Festival
- Born: Ainsley Cameron Seiger; September 4, 1998 (age 28); Cary, North Carolina, US
- Education: University of North Carolina School of the Arts (BFA)
- Occupation: Actress
- Years active: 2018–present

Ainsley Cameron Seiger (born September 4, 1998) is an American actress who appeared as a series regular on Law & Order: Organized Crime as Jet Slootmaekers.

== Early life ==
Seiger is from Cary, North Carolina. Seiger's mother is an opera singer and voice coach, and her father is a jeweler and goldsmith.

Seiger attended Apex High School. While there, she played Wednesday in the school's production of The Addams Family, Cosette in Les Misérables, and Nikki in Curtains the Musical. In July 2016, she was selected as a Triangle Rising Stars by the Durham Performing Arts Center. In addition to being a qualifying event for the National High School Musical Theatre Awards, winners of the Triangle Rising Stars received a $1,000 scholarship and spent a week in New York City performing at Minskoff Theatre, working with Broadway professionals, and representing the Triangle at the Jimmy Awards.

Seiger then attended the University of North Carolina School of the Arts in Winston-Salem, graduating in 2020.

== Career ==
=== On stage ===
While still in college, Seiger played Wendla in a production of Spring Awakening.

In 2018, Seiger performed in Virginia Theater Festival productions of A Chorus Line and The Cocoanuts. She began working with the creative team of the festival when she was fourteen.

Seiger played the lead role in Violet at the PlayMakers Summer Youth Conservatory in July 2021.

In 2023, during the SAG-AFTRA strike, Seiger played Sally Bowles in a Virginia Theatre Festival production of Cabaret.

=== On screen ===
Seiger's first screen role was in 2019 for the short film American Waste. She was also in the short film Bernstein’s MASS: An Artist’s Call for Peace.

In February 2021, Seiger landed her first big Hollywood gig when she became a regular on NBC's Law & Order: Organized Crime, playing the role of hacker Jet Slootmaekers. Because of COVID, she was cast for the role by submitting a recording. A week later, she was cast and had two days to move to New York for shooting. This was her first television credit.

In 2026, Seiger starred as Taylor Prout in the independent dark comedy Party USA, directed by Jared Sprouse.

== Personal life ==
Seiger uses any pronouns (she/they/he), and is bisexual.

== Filmography ==
=== Film ===
Year	Title	Role	Notes
2018	Bernstein's MASS: An Artist's Call for Peace	Themself	
2019	American Waste	Joan	
2026	Party USA	Taylor Prout	

=== Television ===
Year	Title	Role	Notes
2021–2025	Law & Order: Organized Crime	Det. Jet Slootmaekers	Main role
2021–2023	Law & Order: Special Victims Unit	Det. Jet Slootmaekers	3 episodes
2022	Law & Order	Det. Jet Slootmaekers	Episode: "Gimme Shelter – Part Three"

== Awards and nominations ==
Year	Work	Award	Category	Result	Citation
2026	Party USA	Chelsea Film Festival	Best Actress	Won	
2026	Party USA	Cobb International Film Festival	Best Actress	Won	
2026	Party USA	Smodcastle Film Festival	Best Actor - Comedy	Won	
2026	Party USA	Rome International Film Festival	Best Actor	Won	
