= List of FBI episodes =

FBI is an American crime drama television series created by Dick Wolf and Craig Turk that premiered on CBS on September 25, 2018. FBI received a straight-to-series commission for 13 episodes on September 20, 2017. On October 11, 2018, it was announced that the series had received a full season order from CBS. In January 2019, CBS renewed the series for a second season; which premiered on September 24, 2019. Due to the COVID-19 pandemic in the United States, filming was curtailed of the final three episodes of the second season, with the nineteenth episode, "Emotional Rescue", serving as the season finale. In May 2020, CBS renewed the series for a third season, which premiered on November 17, 2020. In March 2021, the series was renewed for a fourth season, which premiered on September 21, 2021. In May 2022, CBS renewed the series for a fifth and sixth season. The fifth season premiered on September 20, 2022. The sixth season premiered on February 13, 2024. In April 2024, CBS renewed the series for seasons seven through nine. The seventh season premiered on October 15, 2024. The ninth season is scheduled to premiere on October 5, 2026.

As of November 16, 2026, 164 episodes of FBI have aired, currently in its ninth season.

== Series overview ==
Season	Episodes	Originally released		Rank	Viewers (millions)
Season	Episodes	First released	Last released	Rank	Viewers (millions)
1	22	September 25, 2018	May 14, 2019	11	12.37
2	19	September 24, 2019	March 31, 2020	4	12.55
3	15	November 17, 2020	May 25, 2021	5	10.98
4	21	September 21, 2021	May 12, 2022	4	10.29
5	23	September 20, 2022	May 23, 2023	4	9.52
6	13	February 13, 2024	May 21, 2024	6	8.82
7	22	October 15, 2024	May 20, 2025	12	10.42
8	22	October 13, 2025	May 18, 2026	20	8.90
9	TBA	October 5, 2026	TBA	TBA	TBA

== Episodes ==
=== Season 1 (2018–19) ===
- Missy Peregrym (Maggie Bell) and the cast of FBI make their debuts in the season premiere, "Pilot".
- Connie Nielsen (SAC Ellen Solberg) departs in the season premiere, "Pilot".
- Sela Ward joins the main cast as Special Agent-in-Charge Dana Mosier and leaves the show in the season finale.

No. overall	No. in season	Title	Directed by	Written by	Original release date	Prod. code	U.S. viewers (millions)
1	1	"Pilot"	Niels Arden Oplev	Teleplay by : Craig Turk; Story by : Dick Wolf & Craig Turk	September 25, 2018	FBI101	10.09
2	2	"Green Birds"	Nick Gomez	Aaron Fullerton	October 2, 2018	FBI104	9.37
3	3	"Prey"	Norberto Barba	Andrew Wilder	October 9, 2018	FBI105	9.17
4	4	"Crossfire"	Arthur W. Forney	Brian Anthony	October 16, 2018	FBI102	9.31
5	5	"Doomsday"	Fred Berner	Judith McCreary	October 23, 2018	FBI106	8.82
6	6	"Family Man"	Jean de Segonzac	Barbie Kligman	October 30, 2018	FBI103	9.41
7	7	"Cops and Robbers"	Jean de Segonzac	Hadi Nicholas Deeb	November 13, 2018	FBI108	9.19
8	8	"This Land Is Your Land"	Charlotte Brandstrom	Claire Demorest	November 20, 2018	FBI109	8.91
9	9	"Compromised"	Ed Ornelas	Katie Swain	December 4, 2018	FBI107	9.72
10	10	"The Armorer's Faith"	Nicole Rubio	Andrew Wilder	December 11, 2018	FBI111	9.04
11	11	"Identity Crisis"	Norberto Barba	Rick Eid	January 15, 2019	FBI112	9.33
12	12	"A New Dawn"	Terry Miller	Brian Anthony	January 22, 2019	FBI110	7.40
13	13	"Partners in Crime"	Jean De Segonzac	Claire Demorest	February 12, 2019	FBI113	9.45
14	14	"Exposed"	Norberto Barba	David Amann	February 19, 2019	FBI114	9.06
15	15	"Scorched Earth"	Nick Gomez	Rick Eid & Brian Anthony	February 26, 2019	FBI115	9.45
16	16	"Invisible"	Charles S. Carroll	Joe Halpin	March 12, 2019	FBI116	8.95
17	17	"Apex"	Jean De Segonzac	Andrew Wilder	March 26, 2019	FBI117	9.13
18	18	"Most Wanted"	Fred Berner	René Balcer	April 2, 2019	FBI118	9.08
19	19	"Conflict of Interest"	Christine Swanson	Nick Santora	April 16, 2019	FBI119	8.76
20	20	"What Lies Beneath"	Vincent Misiano	David Amann	April 30, 2019	FBI120	8.86
21	21	"Appearances"	Jean De Segonzac	Joe Halpin	May 7, 2019	FBI121	8.76
22	22	"Closure"	Nicole Rubio	Rick Eid	May 14, 2019	FBI122	8.56

=== Season 2 (2019–20) ===
- Alana de la Garza (SAC Isobel Castille) is promoted to series regular.
- John Boyd joins the cast in a recurring role, starting with "Little Egypt" through "An Imperfect Science" as Special Agent Stuart Scola. He is promoted to the main cast in the fifth episode, "Crossroads".
- Ebonée Noel (Kristen Chazel) departs the series in the season finale, "Emotional Rescue".

No. overall	No. in season	Title	Directed by	Written by	Original release date	Prod. code	U.S. viewers (millions)
23	1	"Little Egypt"	Arthur W. Forney	Rick Eid	September 24, 2019	FBI201	8.83
24	2	"The Lives of Others"	Alex Chapple	David Amann	October 1, 2019	FBI202	9.46
25	3	"American Idol"	Milena Govich	Mo Masi	October 8, 2019	FBI203	8.70
26	4	"An Imperfect Science"	Jean de Segonzac	Erica Shelton Kodish	October 15, 2019	FBI204	8.75
27	5	"Crossroads"	Charles S. Carroll	Rick Eid & Clare Demorest	October 22, 2019	FBI205	8.87
28	6	"Outsider"	Stephen Surjik	Rick Eid & David Amann	November 5, 2019	FBI206	8.54
29	7	"Undisclosed"	Emile Levisetti	Joe Halpin & Katherine Visconti	November 12, 2019	FBI207	8.87
30	8	"Codename: Ferdinand"	Alex Zakrzewski	David Amann	November 19, 2019	FBI208	8.83
31	9	"Salvation"	Alex Chapple	Rick Eid	November 26, 2019	FBI209	8.81
32	10	"Ties That Bind"	Stephen Surjik	Claire Demorest	December 17, 2019	FBI210	8.47
33	11	"Fallout"	Alex Chapple	David Amann	January 7, 2020	FBI211	9.32
34	12	"Hard Decisions"	Emile Levisetti	Joe Halpin	January 14, 2020	FBI212	8.57
35	13	"Payback"	Monica Raymund	David Amann & Mo Masi	January 21, 2020	FBI213	9.24
36	14	"Studio Gangster"	Alex Chapple	Rick Eid	January 28, 2020	FBI214	9.26
37	15	"Legacy"	Carl Seaton	Claire Demorest	February 11, 2020	FBI215	8.93
38	16	"Safe Room"	Carlos Bernard	Rick Eid & Joe Halpin	February 18, 2020	FBI217	9.22
39	17	"Broken Promises"	Olivia Newman	Tamara Jaron	March 10, 2020	FBI216	8.30
40	18	"American Dreams"	Terry Miller	David Amann	March 24, 2020	FBI218	10.67
41	19	"Emotional Rescue"	Monica Raymund	Rick Eid & Joe Halpin	March 31, 2020	FBI219	10.85

=== Season 3 (2020–21) ===
- Katherine Renee Kane joins the main cast as Special Agent Tiffany Wallace in the season premiere, "Never Trust a Stranger".

No. overall	No. in season	Title	Directed by	Written by	Original release date	Prod. code	U.S. viewers (millions)
42	1	"Never Trust a Stranger"	Alex Chapple	Rick Eid	November 17, 2020	FBI301	8.21
43	2	"Unreasonable Doubt"	Jean de Segonzac	Tom Szentgyörgyi	November 24, 2020	FBI302	8.39
44	3	"Liar's Poker"	Alex Chapple	Joe Halpin	December 8, 2020	FBI303	6.71
45	4	"Crazy Love"	Jean de Segonzac	Rick Eid & Tamara Jaron	January 24, 2021	FBI304	8.99
46	5	"Clean Slate"	Rose Troche	Claire Demorest	January 26, 2021	FBI305	8.27
47	6	"Uncovered"	Alex Chapple	Kristy Lowrey	February 9, 2021	FBI306	7.72
48	7	"Discord"	Carlos Bernard	Andy Callahan	March 2, 2021	FBI307	7.36
49	8	"Walk the Line"	Mykelti Williamson	Rick Eid	March 9, 2021	FBI308	7.66
50	9	"Leverage"	John Polson	Erica Meredith	March 16, 2021	FBI309	8.07
51	10	"Checks and Balances"	Stephen Surjik	Tamara Jaron & Claire Demorest	April 6, 2021	FBI310	8.07
52	11	"Brother's Keeper"	Alex Chapple	Tom Szentgyörgyi	April 27, 2021	FBI311	7.57
53	12	"Fathers and Sons"	Stephen Surjik	Rick Eid & Joe Halpin	May 4, 2021	FBI312	8.08
54	13	"Short Squeeze"	Joanna Kerns	Rick Eid & Joe Halpin	May 11, 2021	FBI313	7.69
55	14	"Trigger Effect"	Monica Raymund	Andy Callahan & Tamara Jaron & Kristy Lowrey	May 18, 2021	FBI314	7.59
56	15	"Straight Flush"	Alex Chapple	Teleplay by : Rick Eid & Joe Halpin; Story by : Claire Demorest & Heather Michaels	May 25, 2021	FBI315	7.08

=== Season 4 (2021–22) ===
No. overall	No. in season	Title	Directed by	Written by	Original release date	Prod. code	U.S. viewers (millions)
57	1	"All That Glitters"	Alex Chapple	Teleplay by : Rick Eid; Story by : Dick Wolf & Rick Eid	September 21, 2021	FBI401	7.12
58	2	"Hacktivist"	Jean de Segonzac	Claire Demorest	September 28, 2021	FBI402	7.37
59	3	"Trauma"	Alex Chapple	Joe Webb	October 5, 2021	FBI403	6.71
60	4	"Know Thyself"	Tim Busfield	Teleplay by : Joe Halpin; Story by : Jen Frosch	October 12, 2021	FBI404	6.75
61	5	"Charlotte's Web"	Yangzom Brauen	Claire Demorest & Heather Michaels	November 2, 2021	FBI406	6.99
62	6	"Allegiance"	John Polson	Keith Eisner	November 9, 2021	FBI405	7.17
63	7	"Gone Baby Gone"	Eif Rivera	Zach Calig	November 16, 2021	FBI407	7.61
64	8	"Fire and Rain"	Sharat Raju	Rick Eid	December 7, 2021	FBI408	7.03
65	9	"Unfinished Business"	Alex Chapple	Teleplay by : Joe Halpin; Story by : Joe Halpin & J.F. Halpin	December 14, 2021	FBI409	8.31
66	10	"Fostered"	Stephen Surjik	Joe Webb & York Walker	January 4, 2022	FBI410	8.52
67	11	"Grief"	Matthew McLoota	Keith Eisner	January 11, 2022	FBI411	8.45
68	12	"Under Pressure"	Brenna Malloy	Claire Demorest	February 1, 2022	FBI412	7.54
69	13	"Pride and Prejudice"	Alex Chapple	Teleplay by : Kristy Lowrey; Story by : Joe Halpin	February 22, 2022	FBI413	7.38
70	14	"Ambition"	Jean de Segonzac	Keith Eisner	March 8, 2022	FBI414	7.71
71	15	"Scar Tissue"	Lisa Robinson	Heather Michaels	March 22, 2022	FBI415	8.03
72	16	"Protective Details"	Alex Zakrzewski	Joe Webb	March 29, 2022	FBI416	7.58
73	17	"One Night Stand"	Alex Chapple	Rick Eid & Joe Halpin	April 12, 2022	FBI417	7.39
74	18	"Fear Nothing"	Jon Cassar	Rick Eid & Joe Halpin	April 19, 2022	FBI418	7.51
75	19	"Face Off"	Jackeline Tejada	Claire Demorest & York Walker	April 26, 2022	FBI419	7.56
76	20	"Ghost from the Past"	Heather Cappiello	Rick Eid & Joe Halpin	May 10, 2022	FBI420	7.16
77	21	"Kayla"	Alex Zakrzewski	Keith Eisner & Joe Webb	May 17, 2022	FBI421	7.15
78	22	"Prodigal Son" (Note: This episode was pulled from its planned airing on May 24, 2022 on CBS due to the Uvalde school shooting that occurred the same day that the episode was scheduled to air. It was, however, aired on other networks as Season 4 Episode 22.)	Alex Chapple	Rick Eid	May 24, 2022	FBI422	6.97

=== Season 5 (2022–23) ===
No. overall	No. in season	Title	Directed by	Written by	Original release date	Prod. code	U.S. viewers (millions)
79	1	"Hero's Journey"	Alex Chapple	Rick Eid & Joe Halpin	September 20, 2022	FBI501	6.81
80	2	"Love is Blind"	Jon Cassar	Alexander Maggio	September 27, 2022	FBI502	7.10
81	3	"Victim"	Carlos Bernard	Rick Eid & Joe Halpin	October 11, 2022	FBI504	7.41
82	4	"Flopped Cop"	Carl Weathers	Thomas Kelly	October 18, 2022	FBI503	7.11
83	5	"Double Blind"	Alex Chapple	Claire Demorest	November 6, 2022	FBI505	6.88
84	6	"Ready or Not"	Stephen Surjik	Heather Michaels & Thomas Kelly	November 15, 2022	FBI506	7.31
85	7	"Into the Fire"	Gonzalo Amat	Joe Webb	November 22, 2022	FBI507	7.54
86	8	"Fortunate Son"	Alex Chapple	Rick Eid & Joe Halpin	December 13, 2022	FBI508	7.39
87	9	"Second Life"	Jon Cassar	Claire Demorest	January 3, 2023	FBI510	7.59
88	10	"Heroes"	Milena Govich	Rick Eid & Joe Halpin	January 10, 2023	FBI509	7.44
89	11	"Breakdown"	Alex Chapple	Alexander Maggio	January 24, 2023	FBI511	7.47
90	12	"Protégé"	Stephanie Marquardt	Joe Webb	February 14, 2023	FBI513	7.20
91	13	"Money for Nothing"	Jean de Segonzac	Rick Eid & Joe Halpin	February 21, 2023	FBI514	6.89
92	14	"The Lies We Tell"	Lisa Robinson	Rick Eid & Joe Halpin	February 28, 2023	FBI515	6.81
93	15	"Family First"	Eduardo Sanchez	York Walker & Thomas Kelly	March 14, 2023	FBI512	7.16
94	16	"Imminent Threat - Part Two"	Alex Chapple	Rick Eid	April 4, 2023	FBI516	6.54
95	17	"Obligation"	Alex Zakrzewski	Claire Demorest	April 11, 2023	FBI517	6.84
96	18	"Sins of the Past"	Oscar Lozoya	Thomas Kelly	April 18, 2023	FBI518	6.76
97	19	"Sisterhood"	Tim Busfield	Rick Eid & Joe Halpin	April 25, 2023	FBI519	6.80
98	20	"Privilege"	Carlos Bernard	Claire Demorest	May 9, 2023	FBI520	6.46
99	21	"Torn"	Yangzom Brauen	Thomas Kelly	May 16, 2023	FBI521	6.58
100	22	"God Complex"	Alex Chapple	Rick Eid & Joe Halpin	May 23, 2023	FBI522	6.54

=== Season 6 (2024) ===
- Katherine Renee Kane (Tiffany Wallace) departs the series in the season finale.

No. overall	No. in season	Title	Directed by	Written by	Original release date	Prod. code	U.S. viewers (millions)
101	1	"All the Rage"	Alex Chapple	Rick Eid & Joe Halpin	February 13, 2024	FBI601	7.70
102	2	"Remorse"	Carlos Bernard	Alexander Maggio	February 20, 2024	FBI602	7.13
103	3	"Stay in Your Lane"	Alex Chapple	Rick Eid & Joe Halpin	February 27, 2024	FBI603	6.38
104	4	"Creating a Monster"	Milena Govich	Peter Elkoff	March 12, 2024	FBI604	7.12
105	5	"Sacrifice"	Laura Belsey	Bryce Ahart & Stephanie McFarlane	March 19, 2024	FBI605	7.12
106	6	"Unforeseen"	Milena Govich	Joe Halpin & Marley Schneier	March 26, 2024	FBI606	6.76
107	7	"Behind the Veil"	Eric Laneuville	Peter Elkoff & Alexander Maggio	April 2, 2024	FBI607	6.88
108	8	"Phantom"	Jean de Segonzac	Rick Eid	April 9, 2024	FBI608	6.40
109	9	"Best Laid Plans"	Alex Chapple	Rick Eid & Joe Halpin	April 16, 2024	FBI609	7.09
110	10	"Family Affair"	Alex Zakrzewski	Bryce Ahart & Stephanie McFarlane	April 23, 2024	FBI610	7.03
111	11	"No One Left Behind"	Monica Raymund	Peter Elkoff	May 7, 2024	FBI611	6.13
112	12	"Consequences"	Carlos Bernard	Alexander Maggio	May 14, 2024	FBI612	5.99
113	13	"Ring of Fire"	Alex Chapple	Rick Eid & Joe Halpin	May 21, 2024	FBI613	6.14

=== Season 7 (2024–25) ===
- Lisette Olivera joins the main cast as Special Agent Sydney Ortiz starting with Episodes 4–8.

No. overall	No. in season	Title	Directed by	Written by	Original release date	Prod. code	U.S. viewers (millions)
114	1	"Abandoned"	Alex Chapple	Mike Weiss	October 15, 2024	FBI701	5.89
115	2	"Trusted"	Milena Govich	Aaron Ginsburg	October 22, 2024	FBI702	5.88
116	3	"Détente"	Laura Belsey	Ryan Maldonado & Eduardo Javier Canto	October 29, 2024	FBI703	5.61
117	4	"Doubted"	Alex Chapple	Bryce Ahart & Stephanie McFarlane	November 12, 2024	FBI704	6.31
118	5	"Pledges"	Jon Cassar	Sabir Pirzada	November 19, 2024	FBI705	6.55
119	6	"Perfect"	Cory Bowles	Mae Smith	December 3, 2024	FBI706	6.66
120	7	"Monumental"	Eriq La Salle	Matthew S. Partney	December 10, 2024	FBI707	6.58
121	8	"Riptide"	Jean de Segonzac	Woody Straussner	December 17, 2024	FBI708	6.68
122	9	"Descent"	Carlos Bernard	Aaron Ginsburg	January 28, 2025	FBI710	6.22
123	10	"Redoubt"	Alex Chapple	Mike Weiss	February 4, 2025	FBI709	5.98
124	11	"Shelter"	Jon Cassar	Ryan Maldonado & Eduardo Javier Canto	February 11, 2025	FBI712	6.05
125	12	"Manhunt"	Nelson McCormick	Bryce Ahart & Stephanie McFarlane	February 18, 2025	FBI711	6.55
126	13	"Unearth"	Jean de Segonzac	Woody Straussner	February 25, 2025	FBI714	6.28
127	14	"Hitched"	Alex Chapple	Mae Smith	March 11, 2025	FBI713	6.43
128	15	"Acolyte"	Loren Yaconelli	Bryce Ahart & Stephanie McFarlane	March 18, 2025	FBI715	6.19
129	16	"Covered"	Alex Chapple	Sabir Pirzada	April 1, 2025	FBI716	6.01
130	17	"Lineage"	Milena Govich	Woody Strassner & Mae Smith & Sabir Pirzada	April 8, 2025	FBI718	6.01
131	18	"Blkpill"	Jon Cassar	Ryan Maldonado & Eduardo Javier Canto	April 15, 2025	FBI717	5.77
132	19	"Partner"	Eriq La Salle	Matthew S. Partney	April 22, 2025	FBI719	5.96
133	20	"Startup"	Peter Stebbings	Aaron Ginsburg	May 6, 2025	FBI720	5.64
134	21	"Devoted"	Carlos Bernard	Suhana Chander & Aaron Ginsberg	May 13, 2025	FBI721	5.73
135	22	"A New Day"	Alex Chapple	Mitch Kampf & Mike Weiss	May 20, 2025	FBI722	6.17

=== Season 8 (2025–26) ===
- Juliana Aidén Martinez joins the main cast as Special Agent Eva Ramos in episode 3.

No. overall	No. in season	Title	Directed by	Written by	Original release date	Prod. code	U.S. viewers (millions)
136	1	"Takeover"	Alex Chapple	Mike Weiss	October 13, 2025	FBI801	4.43
The team investigate the disappearance of a federal judge, only to discover he has been tracking his missing son on the remote island of Port Turner, where local authority has collapsed. The team's search escalates into a dangerous confrontation with armed militants as they attempt to rescue the judge's son and recover the judge himself. Amid the operation, Assistant Special Agent in Charge Jubal Valentine is confronted with the realities of his new responsibilities. Dani dies after receiving the bullet intended for Scola during the armed confrontation with the militia. Meanwhile, Special Agent in Charge Isobel Castille remains in critical condition, but gradually begins to make a recovery.
137	2	"Captured"	Carlos Bernard	Aaron Ginsburg	October 20, 2025	FBI802	4.16
After a security guard is killed and valuable paintings are taken from an international cultural exchange, the Rushman Gallery, the team is dragged into a complex and difficult investigation when they learn that the robbers were blackmailed. Maggie utilises her personal connections by asking a friend to assist in creating a profile of the suspects. The blackmailers are revealed to be members of the Russian Strauss group, who are aiming to rescue their leader, Igor Petrovich, from captivity at the Ukrainian consulate. Meanwhile, Jubal learns the stark realities of keeping promises in his new role as acting Special Agent in Charge.
138	3	"Boy Scout"	Peter Stebbings	Ryan Maldonado & Eduardo Javier Canto	October 27, 2025	FBI803	3.70
Scola and his new partner, Special Agent Eva Ramos, are sent to look into the death of a young man who was found dead on federal land after being beaten. At first, it looks like a random attack, but the team finds links to a bigger operation that involves the DEA and Scola's former DEA mentor Bobby Galloway, which makes it hard to coordinate. Meanwhile, Castille returns to work earlier than expected and is also offered to become the new Assistant Director in Charge of the New York Office.
139	4	"Manifest"	Jon Cassar	Bryce Ahart & Stephanie McFarlane	November 3, 2025	FBI804	4.10
After a failed assassination attempt on a U.S. senator, Maggie and OA are given the job of getting her back to Washington, D.C., on a commercial flight, which quickly turns into a life-or-death situation. During the flight, the senator suddenly collapses, and Maggie notices discoloration in OA's skin, which suggests poisoning rather than natural causes. As officials on the ground get ready for an emergency landing, things get tense as the NY field office has to help Maggie and OA protect the other passengers while also trying to find the person responsible.
140	5	"Falsetto"	Alex Chapple	Sabir Pirzada	November 10, 2025	FBI805	4.11
Maggie partners with Eva Ramos in an investigation after a father is stabbed in broad daylight at a New York City park. The situation escalates when a second murder appears linked to the first, revealing that the attacker may be operating off a carefully crafted hit list. Meanwhile, OA is still recovering from his poisoning in the previous episode.
141	6	"Parental"	Milena Govich	Mae Smith	November 17, 2025	FBI806	4.26
Following the death of a manager of a Rusk medical clinic, the FBI suspects a New Jersey robbery crew to be responsible, but quickly learn that one of the robbers had filed a failed lawsuit against Dr. Franklin Rusk for alleged malpractice after his infant child died during birth. The team later learn Rusk was a part of a trafficking ring, who stole children from drug addicted parents and had adoption agencies give them up for adoption. Meanwhile, Castille faces the challenge of bonding with her new stepchildren.
142	7	"Fadeaway"	Yangzom Brauen	Woody Strassner	December 1, 2025	FBI807	4.42
Eight people die in an apartment explosion, which the team quickly deduce could be related to a gang war between the Latin Kings and United Blood Nations, and suspect that the order came from inside the Ridgebury prison. However the talks of infringement on the Latin Kings' territory escalates into a prison riot-which Ramos and Scola get caught in-after the leader of the United Blood Nations is killed. Meanwhile, Castille prepares to take on her new job, but ultimately turns it down in favor of staying in her current job, feeling that she belongs more in it.
143	8	"Ratlined"	Ken Girotti	Woody Strassner	December 8, 2025	FBI808	4.38
Corridor Daily journalist Holly Chanwell is assassinated while interviewing the Prime Minister of Jordan, but as the team track down her assassin, Zoe Morrison, she as well is killed. Some time later Chanwell's cameraman Quinn Han is also kidnapped. The team learns that a rogue Chinese group working for deputy attaché Licha Jiao have been tracking down critics of China and Chanwell was assassinated for trying to uncover their activities. Castille attempts to make a cooperation agreement with the Chinese consulate to encircle Licha and make her reveal Quinn's location. Meanwhile, OA tries to tell Gemma about him being poisoned, but she instead reveals that she has been cheating on him with a work client.
144	9	"Lone Wolf"	Ludo Littee	Jake Tinker	December 15, 2025	FBI809	5.46
145	10	"Wolf Pack"	Alex Chapple	Bryce Ahart & Stephanie McFarlane	December 15, 2025	FBI810	5.46
Following a tip on the FBI hotline, Maggie, OA and Kelly investigate the disappearance of a prostitute and later discover more victims of a suspected serial killer. However, the team soon learns that the killer, Warren Stroud, had ordered his victims to steal valuable items from selected targets, all as a part of a bigger plan to destroy critical infrastructure in Manhattan. Although they arrest him after killing the surviving victim, his wife Janice, is revealed to be conspiring with him and is attempting to finish the plan. The team manages to foil the plan to bomb a power plant, but are too late to prevent another cell of the 3rd Testament from detonating the fibre optic cable station on Hudson Street, leading to a citywide disruption of power supply and network connection. Having been tipped about Hudson Street by Tyler, Jubal rushes to the scene to tend to his now severely injured son. Minutes before the Hudson Street explosion, Tyler caught the suspects on video. After the explosion, he is rushed to the hospital in critical condition. The team tries out prototype tech by Cado, gaining temporary access to internet and communications. Thanks to Tyler's footage, they identity Baker McCaffery as the mastermind behind the plot, taking over the mantle from his brother Chip. Jubal tracks down a wounded shooter after the subway system is disabled by the 3rd Testament, but some time later the group broadcast a false evacuation alert, directing people towards the tunnels. The team deduces that they intend to target the Holland Tunnel with cyanide. Jubal confronts Baker and a scuffle ensues before he can shut off the gas canisters and arrests Baker. At the hospital, Jubal reads Tyler's college essay, learning how much he really looks up to him and shortly afterwards, Tyler wakes up from his coma.
146	11	"Confetti"	Alex Chapple	Ryan Maldonado & Eduardo Javier Canto	February 23, 2026	FBI812	4.69
Nina Chase works an undercover operation with the aim of flipping Luka Simovic against his father the team manage to convince him in exchange for witness protection. They learn that the Simovic clan intends to merge with the Jalisco cartel when Luka's brother Nikola is set to marry Rosa Ortega. Nina and Maggie go undercover at the wedding alongside Luka, and as the Jalisco cartel shows up, Maggie learns that the widow of the former leader, Alicia, actually took over the cartel instead of the brother, Carlos. Additionally she learns that the Jaliscos never intended to merge with the Simovics, but massacring them so they could take over their enterprise. The team, including Castille and Jubal, are later invited to Nina and Stuart’s wedding.
147	12	"Daybreak"	Milena Govich	Aaron Ginsburg	March 2, 2026	FBI811	4.66
After witness Cordell Meech and two agents are murdered in witness protection, the team initially determine that the AUSA responsible for Meech's grand jury killed the trio, but after the real AUSA is found dead and the imposter confronted, Maggie learns that "Oslo" has returned. Suspecting the other witnesses from Meech's NGO could be targeted next, the team rush to secure them and bring them to 26 Fed. However, "Oslo" infiltrates the building and kills one of the witnesses before OA captures him in an elevator. He reveals that an unknown person contacted him to take out the witnesses, which he only agreed to do because they kidnapped his daughter.
148	13	"Fanatics"	John Behring	Mitch Kampf	March 9, 2026	FBI813	4.97
The team investigate the kidnapping of Landon Gibney, the son of entrepreneur and New York Jackals owner Stan Gibney, after a robbery of a drug supplier goes wrong. However, when Landon reappears unharmed, they learn that the kidnappers instead kidnapped his friend Ricky. The team rushes to track down the kidnappers and stop one of them and save Ricky in the process. Furthermore, they determine that the kidnappers were part of a Big Brother program and are convinced their mentor Eric Atwood was wrongfully convicted of murder. The crew, led by Sean Lewis hold Stan and the Jackals team hostage demanding Atwood's release. As the situation escalates, resulting in the death of the Jackals captain, Eva however, learns that Atwood did actually commit the murder and has him call Sean to tell him the truth and get him into surrendering and releasing Stan. Jubal attempts to convince Stan after his release, to do good by Sean in a process of forgiveness, mirroring what Atwood did for Sean.
149	14	"Forgiven"	Yangzom Brauen	Mae Smith	March 16, 2026	FBI814	4.85
Maggie's sister, Erin goes missing after she was meant to meet with a potential date. Maggie goes off-grid to find her, only to discover that Ray DiStefano, who she but away years ago and previously sought help from in an investigation, has been released from prison and she suspects he is seeking revenge for her withholding his father's death from him. After she is also abducted by DiStefano, OA and the team scramble to find her and Erin. With help from Maggie's mentor Peter Olson, they piece together Ray's backstory to determine where he could possibly he holding them. Maggie manages to escape his clutches and flees through a forest to a lake before DiStefano catches up to her again and they fight, either Maggie toppling DiStefano over the cliff to his death. OA and the team reach her, but true to DiStefano's final words, Maggie is devastated to find that he had already killed Erin before their final showdown.
150	15	"Crusader"	Carlos Bernard	Mike Weiss	March 23, 2026	FBI815	4.94
When two young children and a daycare worker die from accidental exposure to a lethal form of fentanyl, the team investigate, leading them to the supply coming from drug kingpin Hector Vega, which Eva previously had attempted to throw in jail when she was working for the DA's office. Vega works with the team to catch a more notorious kingpin, the relatively unknown Jalen Turner, who has been supplying nitazene. After staging a robbery of Turner's supply, Eva goes to meet him with Vega in an abandoned mall in Queens. However, despite successfully returning his supply, Turner reveals he knew of their robbery and shoots Vega and a shootout ensues. Though the manage to apprehend Turner, Vega manages to escape once again.
151	16	"3 Up, 3 Down"	Anna Dokoza	Woody Strassner	March 30, 2026	FBI816	4.58
A drive-by shooting kills a married couple, where the team discovers that the husband was involved in smuggling trafficking out of the Port of New York, and his supervisor is also killed. Furthermore, they learn that notorious Chechen bomber Anzor Gery had been smuggled in through the port. However, when they track him down, he explains that the Houthis had smuggled him to the US to make a bomb for them used to target the USS Maldonado during Fleet Week. The team scramble to stop the leader from sending drones with the bombs towards the Maldonado, but they are locked on target. However, after a jammer stops their course, OA manages to diverge them into each other saving the Maldonado. As Maggie returns to work, she faces doubts that she is ready to return, which she doesn't acknowledge at first.
152	17	"Shahadah"	Avi Youabian	Sabir Pirzada	April 13, 2026	FBI817	4.66
VA psychiatrist Saima Khan is found dead under an overpass after being kidnapped, having been tortured. The team work with Special Agent Zara Ushruf, going undercover at a local mosque where they suspect the imam is responsible, following up on suspicions regarding the disappearances of two other women. However, when Maggie and OA confront him, it's revealed that he has been protecting women against domestic violence. Another woman, they later learn was actually witness to the murder of the gambling commissioner, but she refuses their protection. They survey her and follow her to her meeting with the hitman who killed the commissioner, later apprehending her for hiding evidence. They also learn that the hit on the commissioner was ordered by a Malaysian gambling company after they initially had been refused to buy up a local casino. Zara invites OA for dinner, later revealing it to actually be a date.
153	18	"Behavior"	Alex Chapple	Ryan Maldonado & Eduardo Javier Canto	April 20, 2026	FBI818	4.76
When a mother and son disappear from a state park, their discovery of their bodies leads them to larger amount of victims which Maggie realises shares similarities with the South Shore Ripper's killing spree back in 2002. Her mentor Peter Olson returns to assist the team with profiling the new killer, which he and Maggie disagree about could imply that the South Shore Ripper has returned. Scola and Eva have a close encounter with a store owner who sold wiring the new Ripper used, but despite sharing some similarities, the team deduce he's not the Ripper. Maggie later deduces that the Ripper's surviving victim, Abel Shaw, is the new Ripper. They race to save his latest victims, but they've already been relocated when Shaw is arrested. Maggie digs into his past during questioning and eventually makes him reveal where the victims are, leading to their subsequent rescue.
154	19	"Fidelity"	Peter Stebbings	Bryce Ahart & Stephanie McFarlane	April 27, 2026	FBI819	4.67
When an FBI evidence locker is robbed, the team discover they killed a billionaire who was under house arrest. Secret cameras help them identify one of the suspects, Jared Huxley, who they learn worked with his brother Sam, seeking revenge for the suicide of their brother Drew, who kept notes of powerful men involved in a pedophile ring. Eva is forced to shoot Jared after she and Scola confronts him, but the team take Drew's diary as evidence toward the men involved in the ring, importantly their ring leader Ricky Benson. They also seek assistance from one of the current victims in going after Benson, whom they arrest in an attempt to escape the city. Castille meets the new ADIC, Lawrence Green, whom she has reservations about, but these are proven wrong when he encourages the team to prosecute the men involved in the pedophile ring.
155	20	"Roleplay"	Jon Cassar	Suhana Chander	May 4, 2026	FBI820	4.67
Susan Grantwell, a major mayoral donor, is murdered in her home after a supposed failed robbery. However, the team eventually learn that her death was a part of a much larger scheme involving her son's tutor, Lucas Williams, who stole her ring to be pawned in order to rely $315,000 to the Bratva which he had accidentally stolen from in a crypto scam. The case pits Jubal against childhood friend and now turned Bratva leader Andrei Ovechkin, who denies that the Bratva had anything to do with Lucas and the kidnapping of his sister Faith. Jubal convinces him to cooperate to lure out the kidnappers, who are aspiring criminals wanting to join the Bratva. However, Andrei is stabbed after he rejects the duo's request and the team quickly apprehend them before tracking down Faith's location and saving her. Despite his assistance, Andrei expresses to Jubal that their next meeting won't be as friends.
156	21	"Long Shot"	Carlos Bernard	Aaron Ginsburg	May 11, 2026	FBI821	4.62
While investigating the Alameda Underground's hideout, OA goes against the orders of ADIC Green and is temporarily reassigned to survey June Taxera, the wife of AU's founder, alongside Zara. The rest of the team continue the investigation after a company executive was murdered by the AU, and later a progressive newspaper's offices is blown up. OA and Zara discover that June is involved in the bombings, having given the orders based through manipulating marketing bets. The team manage to stop the AU from successfully bombing a marathon, but June finds herself as the target on the betting market after Simon Ford uses information from a meeting with Castille and Green. OA and Zara secure June as the rest of the team ascend on their location and disarm the remaining AU members.
157	22	"Defector"	Alex Chapple	Aaron Ginsburg & Ryan Maldonado & Eduardo Javier Canto	May 18, 2026	FBI822	5.39
An armed delivery van supposedly carrying a deadly EMA virus is stopped by armed gunmen, the team scramble to look for the assailants and look into how the virus got stolen in the first place. The trail leads them to the assailants, who have kidnapped the driver and guard, further revealed to be working for Anna Vorpe. The FBI and Vorpe's team work together to track down the virus and it's prototype cure, which have been taken by members of South African terror group Vierstaat from a defector from the virology lab. A Vierstat member holds an entire bus hostage and releases the virus forcing a quarantine, while also demanding the release of an Albanian oligarch. As the team secures the cure, Vorpe's team takes it for themselves after injuring Maggie and OA, who opposed them. The bus outbreak is covered up and Green fires OA for protesting the move. Vorpe approaches OA afterwards, offering him a spot on her team. OA accepts and informs Maggie and Castille, implying that he will be their inside man within Vorpe's team.

=== Season 9 (2026) ===
No. overall	No. in season	Title	Directed by	Written by	Original release date	Prod. code	U.S. viewers (millions)
158	1	"Rendition"	Alex Chapple	Aaron Ginsburg	October 5, 2026	FBI901	5.53
159	2	"Omissions"	Michael Katleman	Eduardo Javier Canto & Ryan Maldonado	October 12, 2026	FBI902	5.21
160	3	"White Rock"	John Behring	Sabir Pirzada	October 19, 2026	FBI903	5.24
161	4	"Reticence"	John Behring	Bryce Ahart & Stephanie McFarlane	October 26, 2026	FBI904	5.11
162	5	"Atonement"	Jonathan Brown	Woody Strassner	November 2, 2026	FBI905	5.48
163	6	"Ultimatum"	Nimisha Mukerji	Mae Smith	November 9, 2026	FBI906	5.54
164	7	"Posterity"	Milena Govich	Jake Tinker	November 16, 2026	FBI907	6.29
165	8	"22 Minutes"	John Behring	Eduardo Javier Canto & Ryan Maldonado	November 30, 2026	FBI908	TBD
166	9	"Perdition"	Peter Stebbings	Woody Strassner	December 7, 2026	FBI909	TBD
167	10	"Albatross"	Jean de Segonzac	Aaron Ginsburg	December 14, 2026	FBI910	TBD

== See also ==
- FBI (franchise)
- List of FBI: Most Wanted episodes
- List of FBI: International episodes
