= List of FBI: International episodes =

FBI: International is an American crime television series that airs on CBS. It is the second spin-off from Dick Wolf's drama FBI and the third series in the FBI franchise. The series follows a team of FBI special agents who investigate crime and terrorism abroad. FBI: International premiered on September 21, 2021, and a full season was ordered in October 2021.

In May 2022, CBS renewed the series for a second and third season. The second season premiered on September 20, 2022. The third season premiered on February 13, 2024. On April 9, 2024, CBS renewed the series for a fourth season which premiered on October 15, 2024. In March 2025, CBS canceled the series after four seasons.

During the course of the series, 78 episodes of FBI: International aired over four seasons, between September 21, 2021, and May 20, 2025.

== Series overview ==
Season	Episodes	Originally released		Rank	Rating
Season	Episodes	First released	Last released	Rank	Rating
1	21	September 21, 2021	May 24, 2022	16	8.23
2	22	September 20, 2022	May 23, 2023	15	7.74
3	13	February 13, 2024	May 21, 2024	18	7.09
4	22	October 15, 2024	May 20, 2025	TBA	TBA

== Episodes ==
=== Season 1 (2021–22) ===
No. overall	No. in season	Title	Directed by	Written by	Original release date	Prod. code	U.S. viewers (millions)
1	1	"Pilot"	Michael Katleman	Teleplay by : Derek Haas; Story by : Dick Wolf & Derek Haas	September 21, 2021	INT101	6.43
2	2	"The Edge"	Michael Katleman	Derek Haas	September 28, 2021	INT102	6.04
3	3	"Secrets as Weapons"	Deborah Kampmeier	Matt Olmstead	October 5, 2021	INT103	6.08
4	4	"American Optimism"	Deborah Kampmeier	Matt Olmstead	October 12, 2021	INT104	5.64
5	5	"The Soul of Chess"	Alex Zakrzewski	Wade McIntyre	November 2, 2021	INT105	5.42
6	6	"The Secrets She Knows"	Anton Cropper	Brooke Roberts	November 9, 2021	INT106	5.59
7	7	"Trying to Grab Smoke"	Alex Zakrzewski	Matt Olmstead	November 16, 2021	INT107	5.96
8	8	"Voice of the People"	John Polson	Stuti Malhotra	December 7, 2021	INT108	5.79
9	9	"One Kind of Madman"	Michael Katleman	Roxanne Paredes	January 4, 2022	INT109	6.06
10	10	"Close to the Sun"	Rob Greenlea	Hussain Pirani	January 11, 2022	INT110	6.29
11	11	"Chew Toy"	Rob Greenlea	Hussain Pirani	February 1, 2022	INT111	6.25
12	12	"One Point One Million Followers"	Hernan Otaño	Derek Haas	February 22, 2022	INT112	6.14
13	13	"Snakes"	Loren Yaconelli	Matt Olmstead	March 8, 2022	INT113	5.92
14	14	"The Kill List"	David Barrett	Wade McIntyre	March 22, 2022	INT114	6.12
15	15	"Shouldn't Have Left Her"	Michael Katleman	Derek Haas	March 29, 2022	INT115	6.24
16	16	"Left of Boom"	Nina Lopez-Corrado	Rachael Joyce	April 12, 2022	INT116	5.79
17	17	"Uprooting"	Avi Youabian	Brooke Roberts	April 19, 2022	INT117	6.02
18	18	"On These Waters"	Michael Katleman	Hussain Pirani	April 26, 2022	INT118	6.10
19	19	"Get That Revolution Started"	Jonathan Brown	Wade McIntyre	May 10, 2022	INT119	5.82
20	20	"Black Penguin"	Milan Cheylov	Roxanne Paredes	May 17, 2022	INT120	5.96
21	21	"Crestfallen"	Rob Greenlea	Matt Olmstead	May 24, 2022	INT121	5.32

=== Season 2 (2022–23) ===
No. overall	No. in season	Title	Directed by	Written by	Original release date	Prod. code	U.S. viewers (millions)
22	1	"Unburdened"	Jonathan Brown	Derek Haas	September 20, 2022	INT201	5.44
23	2	"Don't Say Her Name Again"	Avi Youabian	Matt Olmstead	September 27, 2022	INT202	5.88
24	3	"Money Is Meaningless"	Jonathan Brown	Wade McIntyre	October 4, 2022	INT203	5.97
25	4	"Copper Pots and Daggers"	Avi Youabian	Roxanne Paredes	October 11, 2022	INT204	6.15
26	5	"Yesterday's Miracle"	Attila Szalay	Hussain Pirani	October 18, 2022	INT205	6.09
27	6	"Call It Anarchy"	Milena Govich	Rachael Joyce	November 15, 2022	INT206	5.51
28	7	"A Proven Liar"	Michael Katleman	Kristina Thomas	November 22, 2022	INT207	5.82
29	8	"Hail Mary"	Jen McGowan	Edgar Castillo	December 13, 2022	INT208	5.41
30	9	"Wheelman"	John Behring	Derek Haas	January 3, 2023	INT209	5.48
31	10	"BHITW"	Alex Zakrzewski	Matt Olmstead	January 10, 2023	INT210	5.82
32	11	"Someone She Knew"	Jonathan Brown	Roxanne Paredes	January 24, 2023	INT211	6.06
33	12	"Glimmers and Ghosts"	Kevin Dowling	Edgar Castillo	February 14, 2023	INT212	5.49
34	13	"Indefensible"	Alex Zakrzewski	Hussain Pirani	February 21, 2023	INT213	5.22
35	14	"He Who Speaks Dies"	Deborah Kampmeier	Rachael Joyce	February 28, 2023	INT214	5.55
36	15	"Trust"	Nina Lopez-Corrado	Derek Haas	March 14, 2023	INT215	5.54
37	16	"Imminent Threat—Part One"	Michael Katleman	Teleplay by : Wade McIntyre; Story by : Rick Eid & Wade McIntyre	April 4, 2023	INT217	6.51
38	17	"Jealous Mistress"	Eduardo Sanchez	Kristina Thomas	April 11, 2023	INT216	5.79
39	18	"Blood Feud"	Avi Youabian	Hussain Pirani	April 18, 2023	INT218	5.26
40	19	"Dead Sprint"	Michael Katleman	Kyle Steinbach	April 25, 2023	INT219	5.49
41	20	"A Tradition of Secrets"	Attila Szalay	Wade McIntyre	May 9, 2023	INT220	5.44
42	21	"Fed to the Sharks"	Loren Yaconelli	Roxanne Paredes	May 16, 2023	INT221	5.47
43	22	"Fencing the Mona Lisa"	Michael Katleman	Matt Olmstead & Edgar Castillo	May 23, 2023	INT222	5.36

=== Season 3 (2024) ===
No. overall	No. in season	Title	Directed by	Written by	Original release date	Prod. code	U.S. viewers (millions)
44	1	"June"	Michael Katleman	Matt Olmstead	February 13, 2024	INT301	5.97
45	2	"The Last Stop"	Nina Lopez-Corrado	Edgar Castillo	February 20, 2024	INT302	5.44
46	3	"Magpie"	Alex Zakrzewski	Hussain Pirani	February 27, 2024	INT303	5.18
47	4	"Cowboy Behavior"	Michael Katleman	Roxanne Paredes	March 12, 2024	INT304	5.40
48	5	"Death by Inches"	Jonathan Brown	Wade McIntyre	March 19, 2024	INT305	5.34
49	6	"Fire Starter"	Kevin Dowling	Rachael Joyce	March 26, 2024	INT306	5.08
50	7	"Andiamo!"	Jonathan Brown	Kyle Steinbach	April 2, 2024	INT307	5.42
51	8	"Remove the Compromise"	John Behring	Edgar Castillo	April 9, 2024	INT308	5.33
52	9	"Rules of Blackjack"	Yangzom Brauen	Hussain Pirani	April 16, 2024	INT309	5.70
53	10	"Red Light"	Michael Katleman	Rachael Joyce	April 23, 2024	INT310	5.74
54	11	"Touts"	Attila Szalay	Wade McIntyre	May 7, 2024	INT311	4.94
55	12	"Gift"	Milena Govich	Roxanne Parades	May 14, 2024	INT312	4.79
56	13	"Tuxhorn"	Michael Katleman	Matt Olmstead & Kyle Steinbach	May 21, 2024	INT313	4.52

=== Season 4 (2024–25) ===
No. overall	No. in season	Title	Directed by	Written by	Original release date	Prod. code	U.S. viewers (millions)
57	1	"A Leader, Not a Tourist"	Michael Katleman	Matt Olmstead	October 15, 2024	INT401	4.99
Following a pursuit of a group of robbers in Los Angeles which leads to his partner being hospitalised, Supervisory Special Agent Wesley "Wes" Mitchell heads to Budapest and continues the investigation into the robbery crew with the Fly Team. But with two of the robbers most likely killed, the team and Mitchell rely on information from the surviving member, Vilmos Barany, who reveals that Greg Czonka, a dual citizen who runs a youth center, recruits boys from his centre to conduct robberies on his behalf, with further evidence pointing to a remitting scheme. Mitchell's unofficial visit to Czonka puts him at odds with Hungarian police and a reprimand from Vo. Mitchell later learns that his partner died from complications during surgery, and the case claims a further victim when they learn that an embassy counsellor was on Czonka's payroll. As Czonka is arrested, he vows to get back at Mitchell. With his relationship in shambles, Mitchell is offered to work with the Fly Team by Vo, who views him as more qualified than their current leader, an offer Mitchell is left to consider.: This episode marks the debut appearance of Jesse Lee Soffer (Wesley "Wes" Mitchell).
58	2	"The Other Hard Part"	John Behring	Edgar Castillo	October 22, 2024	INT402	4.80
With Mitchell taking over as the new Fly Team leader, the team are dispatched to Rotterdam to assist the Dutch police when the US Ambassador to the Netherlands, Arthur Coates, is taken hostage at the World One News TV station along with 60 civilians. The crew demands a transfer of €40 million and a helicopter in exchange for releasing the hostages. The team learns that imprisoned businessman Clemens Anholts masterminded the plot through secret messages to retrieve the location of the key witness against him for the murder of his ex-girlfriend, from the ambassador. Once the hostages are freed and the crew apprehended, the Fly Team go rogue to secure the witness, guarding themselves against police on Anholts' payroll. Mitchell fends her off from a hitman, but is wounded in the process, but nonetheless manages to keep him at bay until the Fly Team and Dutch police arrive. The conviction against Anholts is retained as he is extradited to the US, while the witness is put in witness protection until she can testify.: Jeremy Sisto (Jubal Valentine) is credited as a Special Guest Star.
59	3	"Nothing Sudden About It"	Avi Youabian	Rachael Joyce	October 29, 2024	INT403	4.69
Seventeen-year-old Leah Cardwell is abducted while out on a beach party in Lisbon, Portugal. The Fly Team joins the Portuguese police in tackling the investigation, but less than 24 hours after Leah was abducted, she is found alive and well, further revealing that she was let go after the kidnapper heard her mother's vows in the news. The case takes an unusual turn when they begin to doubt Leah's story, suspecting the entire abduction could have been staged. Though they are able to confirm her story, a closer look at her parents' history reveals that her father most recently secured custody over her two brothers and Leah is scheduled to dump her father's surname once she turns eighteen, and he most likely hired the kidnapper to make the mother look bad. This is further proven when the father officially submits a child negligence complaint. Mitchell and Vo force the father into a corner, leaving him no choice but confess or risk prison time in either the US or Portugal.
60	4	"The Unwinnable War"	Milena Govich	Wade McIntyre	November 12, 2024	INT404	4.85
The Deputy Inspector General approaches the Fly Team with a special assignment to investigate corrupt DEA agent Daniel Lopez operating in Madrid, Spain, and more specifically asking Tate to work undercover with her skillset; to get him to implicate himself. Though hesitant at first, Tate accepts the assignment. The team arrives in Madrid under the guise of assisting the DEA in their drug investigation into the Serrano cartel, whom they discover Lopez is working with. Tate joins Lopez in speaking to his informant, but quickly deduces that it must be someone else. Without informing Lopez, the team apprehends the real informant and turn him against Lopez and set up a bait for him about a false raid. But the cartel sees through this, leading to Tate's cover being blown after she visits Lopez prior to his meeting with the cartel's attorney, but the team rapidly come to her rescue. The team convince Lopez' corrupt colleagues to turn against him, securing the conviction against him.
61	5	"The Future's Looking Bright"	Loren Yaconelli	Hussain Pirani	November 19, 2024	INT405	5.18
Delawarean Gil Schrader arrives in Warsaw, Poland, to meet Natalya Kovalenko, a girl he met on an online dating site, only for them both to abducted shortly after meeting each other in person. The Fly Team arrive to assist the Polish police in the case, but find their resources stretched thin. Schrader's abduction is revealed to be a part of a dating scam and that Natalya was in on the plan, but once apprehended, they convince her to cooperate to bring Schrader back. But with his bank accounts frozen by his daughter, the scammers force her to pay for her father's return. Through a middleman, the team and police find and free Schrader, but Smitty vows to save British national Keith Edmunds who also fell victim to the scammers and whose finger they found at Schrader's abduction site. The team decides to support her effort and together they head to Edmunds' last known location and fight through shooters before managing to free him.
62	6	"They Paid More"	Michael Katleman	Roxanne Paredes	December 3, 2024	INT406	5.00
Twelve American volunteers for the charity organisation Guided Hand are abducted in the high Atlas Mountains in Morocco and the Fly Team are dispatched to assist Moroccan police with the case. They learn that a checkpoint guard had gone back on his deal with Guided Hand founder Emmy Devlin, who is later found alive and well in another city. Furthermore, the abductors are revealed to be led by a Russian mercenary with a history of kidnapping foreign volunteers in Africa. Through a random video, the team determine that Emmy's husband Mark was held in an old school, which is empty when they get there. However, further evidence points them to a compound where the hostages are being kept and the Russian has his base of operations. The team go in and rescue the hostages. Mark demands other civilians be released as well, forcing Mitchell's hand. Once the hostages are saved, both Mark and Emmy are sent back to the US due to their outstanding warrants for unpaid debts, fraud and other economic charges by the IRS.
63	7	"Keen as a Bean"	Brenna Malloy	Kyle Steinbach	December 10, 2024	INT407	4.98
Tyler Booth, an agent and an acquittance of Mitchell, convinces Kelsey Haskins, the ex-wife of traitor and blackmailer Ed Haskins, to assist the FBI in luring him out of Russia. He heads to Budapest to receive Mitchell and the Fly Team's help, which Mitchell accepts. But not long after they proceed with their investigation, they learn that Ed rather wants to meet Kelsey in Tallinn, Estonia. Booth and the team attempt to keep the operation covert, but the Estonian police uncover their operation and offers their discretion despite them not initially being informed. Booth and Mitchell manage to make Kelsey push forward Ed's arrival time, but to everyone's surprise, she joins him when he arrives, risking imprisonment herself once they are both arrested. Additionally with Booth's daughter targeted, the team convince Ed to save Kelsey from imprisonment in exchange for his material password. The deputy director offers Booth ninety days temporary work with the Fly Team until he can figure out his next assignment.
64	8	"You'll Never See It Coming"	Michael Katleman	Edgar Castillo	December 17, 2024	INT408	5.25
Vilmos Barany is killed in prison by Greg Czonka before he can testify against him. The Fly Team work with the Hungarian prosecution to salvage the case against Czonka. During trail, Czonka's defence attempt to use Booth's testimony to discredit Mitchell's integrity as an agent and he later takes the stand himself, realising Czonka is going after him personally. With Mitchell's credibility in doubt, the judge considers ruling in favour of Czonka, until the team identifies the prison guard who put Barany together with Czonka. He provides them with a recording of who contacted him, identified as Victor Stoll. But before they can apprehend Stoll, he commits suicide. The team uses Stoll's safe keep of transactions against Czonka, which implicates him in Barany's death. Despite receiving a new sentence, Czonka later escapes from his prisoner transport and a sniper injures Vo in the process. The team locate an airfield Czonka made, but he has left the country when they reach it. With Vo in critical condition, Mitchell vows to get Czonka even without the badge.
65	9	"The Kill Floor"	Alex Zakrzewski	Matt Olmstead & Edgar Castillo	January 28, 2025	INT409	4.47
The hunt for Csonka takes the team to Paris, where Csonka has killed an old associate of his for refusing to help him. With the assistance of the French police, the team question his girlfriend Valerie, who guides them to his apartment, but this is soon revealed to be a diversion and Raines is kidnapped in the confusion. Mitchell and Booth go to great lengths to make Valerie help them get a ping on Csonka's location. Raines manages to break free from his restraints when Csonka is forced to change plans and manages to stab him in the leg. Mitchell and Booth manage to catch up to him and the former confronts him one last time before he is forced to shoot him when he tries to resist. Mitchell gives wine to the family whose apartment they accidentally broke into earlier, who also forgive him for the blunder. Vo continues to be in critical condition and Tate updates the family in case her condition should get worse, but she later eventually begins to recover.
66	10	"Keep Calm and Deliver The Biotoxin"	Steve Robin	Wade McIntyre	February 4, 2025	INT410	4.36
Russian biochemist Vasily Sviridov is murdered while attempting to defect with his highly sensitive biotoxins research, tasking his daughter Yulia last minute to bring the research to his American confidant dr. Alexander Chang. Raines, Smitty and Booth are deployed to intercept and escort her to safety from Lviv, Ukraine to Kraków in neighbouring Poland. However, underway, two Russian GRU operatives almost capture her in order to retrieve the research, but the trio stops them. In Poland, Yulia is brought to a temporary safe place with Raines before more Russians arrive, but Booth picks them up and brings them to Smitty. While Raines and Yulia head to Warsaw, Smitty and Booth secretly deliver the biotoxins to the research lab. Raines meanwhile hands over a scapegoat suitcase to the Russians before he and Yulia can get to safety. Booth learns that Smitty is intent on telling the truth about the events in Paris pending an inquiry, and could jeopardise his promotion. Smitty concludes to resign from the team so Booth can get his promotion, but Mitchell ensures that Booth departs for home and is reunited with his daughter, while retaining Smitty.
67	11	"Veritas Fidelis"	Yangzom Brauen	Beatrice Morgan	February 11, 2025	INT411	4.34
Smitty asks the Fly Team to take on the case of Emma Byers, an American student at Blackmore University in Muswell, England, who was found in a river with defence wounds indicating foul play. The team learns that Byers was accepted into the Covington Club, a secret society with a long history. When another member of the club is murdered, they learn from her computer that she was enacting revenge against the club, with documented evidence of crimes committed by members, after her rape case was dismissed. Furthermore, both Byers and the male victim were silenced from revealing the truth. Byers' identified rapist, James Haylett, flees the country for Russia with his father, but they divert their plane to Rostock, but German Europol led by Katrin Jaeger, are stopped from apprehending James due to his German citizenship protection under German law. However, after freezing the father's assets from Russia, Jaeger is able to apprehend James. Raines also determines that Smitty was framed in the case that led to her expulsion from Blackmore, by the chancellor herself, prompting her arrest.
68	12	"Blood Doesn't Become Water"	Michael Katleman	Rachael Joyce	February 18, 2025	INT412	4.96
The murder of six-year-old Dillon Portillo in Baltimore leads FBI agent Riley Quinn to join the Fly Team in searching for his brother Liam, their mother Monica and stepfather Ahmed Bashar, who have fled to Istanbul, Turkey. There, the team are assisted by Turkish intelligence. Quinn is also tasked by Dave Zaleski from Internal Affairs to find evidence of Mitchell potentially being corrupt in exchange for a reduced sentence for her brother, an ATF agent jailed under wrong pretenses. Through a web of links to human smuggling to Syria, the team learns that Ahmed intended to take Monica and Liam to the country, but after falling short of money to get them all there, they leave Liam behind in an apartment in mafia territory. The duo head for his uncle's car shop in a last ditch attempt at finding more money, but Ahmed flees in a fit of rage and Monica stays behind in hiding until the team arrives. Seeing their window closing to stop Ahmed before he reaches the Syrian border, the team fly in to apprehend him before he can do so.
69	13	"You've Been Greenlit"	Attila Szalay	Hussain Pirani	February 25, 2025	INT413	4.80
Businessman James Reed is shot in broad daylight in Bratislava, Slovakia and Becca Morgan is held by Slovak police until the perpetrator can be apprehended. The Fly Team is called in to assist in the investigation. Looking into Reed's business, they quickly determine that local partner Oto Kostra's enforcement of their business makes him a potential suspect. Despite Becca identifying him as the shooter, Slovak captain Janic insists on his innocence, which proves correct when Reed's autopsy determines that Becca killed him, but she has already been released. The team manages to secure Reed's business partner Steve Hale before she can kill him, while her motives are revealed to be traced to her father losing his startup to Reed and Hale. They chase her to the docks and apprehend her, but Janic is revealed to be corrupt, and Mitchell is forced to shoot him and is arrested. Quinn's testimony, however, swiftly clears him of any wrongdoing. Feeling the pressure from her brother and Zaleski, Quinn refers the latter to the Paris incident and later reveals the truth to Vo.
70	14	"A Winged Lion for Protection"	Avi Youabian	Roxanne Paredes	March 11, 2025	INT414	4.86
Caitlyn Priolo is murdered in her employer's, Marlena Klein, apartment in Venice and the latter is held by the police as a person of interest. The team learn that through her work in house flipping, Klein was caught in a wire fraud scheme set up by her affair partner Baron Dario Caspani. Digging deeper, they learn that Priolo had found out about the scheme and had saved info to expose Caspani, but their investigation is interrupted by the CIA's Martin Russo, who reveals that Caspani is involved with illegal weapons smuggled to the Middle East. Mitchell asks Russo to also get Zaleski of his and Quinn's backs after Vo informs him of the former's predicament. Despite a hitman confessing he was hired by Caspani and Priolo's evidence, the Italian prosecutor refuses to apprehend him. Frustrated with the outcome, Mitchell leaks the proof to local media. With Zaleski dealt with, Quinn is set to join the Violent Crimes Unit back home upon her return.
71	15	"They May Get Their Wish"	Peter Stebbings	Kyle Steinbach	March 18, 2025	INT415	4.59
Most Wanted Indonesian evangelist Bakti Santoso resurfaces in Gibraltar, prompting the Fly Team to head there to conduct surveillance on him until they get enough proof to apprehend him. Due to lack of evidence, Europol and the Gibraltar police are not committed to apprehending him. They also try to infiltrate his movement by having bugs planted with the help of follower Isla Hewitt, who initially refuses to do so before changing her mind and committing to the task. Tate learns that Santoso surveyed his own home, thereby exposing Hewitt's involvement, but it also reveals his true intentions with Hewitt’s daughter, prompting Mitchell to utilize Santoso's footage as evidence. Santoso flees across the Spanish border to his hideout outside Algeciras and the team work with reluctant Spanish police to infiltrate his hideout and arrest Santoso and his remaining followers. Ella Driscoll, Mitchell's ex-girlfriend and fellow agent, reaches out to him about a case, which he initially dismisses until she personally arrives in Budapest to speak to him.: Jeremy Sisto (Jubal Valentine) is credited as a Special Guest Star.
72	16	"Little Angel"	Steve Robin	Wade McIntyre	April 1, 2025	INT416	4.54
Driscoll asks Mitchell and the Fly Team to assist her in investigating the cryptocurrency extortion and kidnapping of business executive Bryce Mayfield's family in Prague. They learn that the kidnappers work for the Nikolic syndicate, who Mayfield loaned money from and his family was kidnapped in order to force him to repay them. With a ransom in demand, the team keep tabs on Mayfield as he makes the drop, but the kidnappers don't meet up, but still release his family. A clue left by Mayfield's bodyguard leads them to the kidnappers' hideout and subsequent takedown. Suspicious of Driscoll's undercover record, Tate investigates further and learns that her stepfather had invested in Mayfield's business potentially causing a conflict of interest. When confronted with this, Driscoll admits that her overarching goal was to get back with Mitchell. Upon learning this, Mitchell aims to cut Driscoll out of his life and asks Tate for advice. She advises him to let Driscoll go and keep the case intact.
73	17	"Dead Dead"	Michael Katleman	Beatrice Morgan	April 8, 2025	INT417	4.82
DNI behavioral analyst David Steiner goes missing while hiking with his family and friends in Grisons, Switzerland. The Fly Team assist Tyler Booth with the investigation and quickly deduce that the circumstances of Steiner's disappearance and supposed death are highly suspicious, leading them to gradually conclude that he faked his death. Looking into his digital footprint, they learn that he was having an affair with his friend's daughter, Olivia. Additionally both Olivia's father and Steiner's wife Carolyn suspected he was having affairs with multiple women, another also revealed to be the US ambassador. Learning that he was attempting to flee the country, they find him dead in his hideout. Suspecting Carolyn to be responsible, they question her until deducing that the details don't add up and quickly realign focus towards the oldest son, Finn, whom she was trying to protect. Mitchell learns that his biological father, Dean Bartlett, has filed for early release and becomes determined to ensure he stays in prison.
74	18	"Lone Wolf"	Steve Robin	Rachael Joyce	April 15, 2025	INT418	4.59
A Georgian soldier goes rogue and shoots several US soldiers during a joint US-Georgia military exercise but is killed before he can flee. Working with general Finley, the team work under the assumption that the shooting was an act of terrorism, which leads them to the Sakartvelo Liberation Front, who opposes US and Western involvement in the country. Following the bombing of an American community centre in Tbilisi, Booth suspects the SLF is targeting the US embassy next, prompting an immediate lockdown just as nine SLF members infiltrate the embassy. Booth is forced to leave a Georgian intelligence worker outside the safe room, who the SLF use as a hostage and demands their message be broadcast. Smitty and Raines go in undercover as a news crew and save the hostage before clearing the path for the others to enter and rescue Booth, the ambassador and embassy personnel. Having been released through his commuted sentence, Mitchell's biological father, Dean, attempts to contact him, but Mitchell rejects his offer to meet up.
75	19	"Flinch Now and It's Over"	Attila Szalay	Hussain Pirani	April 22, 2025	INT419	4.55
Weapons dealer Ray Lockhart surfaces in Vienna after stealing drones from a Polish military base. Mitchell and Smitty go undercover as a South African couple trying to buy the drones, but they quickly learn that Lockhart has already found a buyer and additionally his nephew Jordan is killed after being brought onboard as the team's informant. The team work to derail Lockhart's initial buyer, allowing Mitchell and Smitty to take up the mantle. Smitty nearly finds her cover compromised with Nicole Lockhart but convinces her to help her and the team to ensure her freedom from Ray's reign. While Mitchell ensues Lockhart's test of character before securing the purchase, Austrian police and the team breach the compound once Lockhart confirms the location of the remaining drones. Mitchell's biological father arrives in Budapest to speak to him, which he reluctantly agrees to. Unconvinced he has changed, Mitchell leaves him with X-rays of his broken jaw as a child while also learning that he has a sister, which he feels indifferent about.
76	20	"We're Out of Here"	Jon Cassar	Roxanne Parades	May 6, 2025	INT420	4.47
The team are called in last minute to handle a prisoner exchange between the US and Iran when the US envoy for hostage affairs George Campbell is held back in Romania due to a governmental investigation into a suspected rescuer to one of the Iranian prisoners. Upon the team reaching Belgrade, where the exchange will take place, unknown perpetrators wreck their convoy and rescue prisoner Zahra Nawaz. The team learns that her cousin Mohsen Shah orchestrated her rescue, but Vo kills her after she resists once they've tracked her down. The exchange still goes ahead, but only two of the American hostages are released. Mitchell reaches an agreement to hand over Shah once he has been found, which the team does with the help of his niece, securing the release of the last hostage. Booth encourages Mitchell to determine whether his father lied about his sister, which he later discovers he did not. Dean calls the sister, Delilah, informing her of his attempt to convince Mitchell to meet her.
77	21	"Herbivore Man"	Milena Govich	Teleplay by : Kyle Steinbach; Story by : Matt Olmstead & Kyle Steinbach	May 13, 2025	INT421	4.40
Medical student Naomi Fearnley is found dead and gagged in a Budapest hotel room and the team determine that she led a double life to help her father financially. Upon learning that Japanese police have looked into her case files, they learn that they have investigated similar cases in Tokyo and dispatches detective Isokawa to assist them. However, the team later finds themselves at odds with the Japanese over their suspect, and after Tate accesses their case files, learns that there were at least 12 victims in Tokyo, more then what the Japanese initially shared. Together with Hungarian police, they initiate an undercover operation to catch the killer in the act. Upon arrest, he is identified as business executive Kenzo Takeyama, but he denies responsibility and later commits suicide by cyanid pill. Takeyama's online history however proves that he had an accomplice who still operates in Tokyo. Despite their investigative differences, Isokawa's superior approves Mitchell's request to join them in their home country.
78	22	"Gaijin"	Michael Katleman	Teleplay by : Edgar Castillo; Story by : Matt Olmstead & Edgar Castillo	May 20, 2025	INT422	4.80
Upon arriving in Tokyo, Mitchell learns from his team that another victim, Heather Washburn, has been abducted by the second perpetrator. They manage to identify the perpetrator as Lloyd Acuff, a longtime American resident in Tokyo. After speaking to him, Mitchell asks Isokawa's superior to keep tabs on Acuff, but internal rules prevent him from doing so. Mitchell and Isokawa deal with Heather's mother who has arrived looking for her daughter, but to their surprise, Acuff reaches out under the pretense of helping her. Speaking to his earliest victim, they secure DNA samples to support Acuff's suspicion. Furthermore, they seek the Takeyamas’ approval to search Kenzo's property, discovering a torture chamber and proof of at least fifty more victims. When Isokawa is put off the case, Mitchell races to capture Acuff, get a confession and a location for Heather before saving her. Raines and Vo await the results for who of them will get the new GS14 job, while Mitchell goes to Pittsburgh to finally meet his half-sister, Delilah.

== See also ==
- FBI (franchise)
- List of FBI episodes
- List of FBI: Most Wanted episodes
