= List of FBI: Most Wanted episodes =

FBI: Most Wanted is an American crime drama television series created by René Balcer and produced by Wolf Entertainment that was ordered to series by CBS in May 2019. It premiered on January 7, 2020. In May 2020, the series was renewed for a second season; which premiered on November 17, 2020. In March 2021, CBS renewed the series for a third season; which premiered on September 21, 2021. In May 2022, CBS renewed the series for a fourth and fifth season. The fourth season premiered on September 20, 2022. The fifth season premiered on February 13, 2024. In April 2024, CBS renewed the series for a sixth season which premiered on October 15, 2024. In March 2025, CBS canceled the series after six seasons.

During the course of the series, 108 episodes of FBI: Most Wanted aired over six seasons, between January 7, 2020, and May 20, 2025.

== Series overview ==
Season	Episodes	Originally released		Rank	Avg. viewership (in millions)
Season	Episodes	First released	Last released	Rank	Avg. viewership (in millions)
Backdoor pilot		April 2, 2019		—N/a	9.08
1	14	January 7, 2020	May 5, 2020	17	10.20
2	15	November 17, 2020	May 25, 2021	14	8.83
3	22	September 21, 2021	May 24, 2022	12	8.75
4	22	September 20, 2022	May 23, 2023	14	8.02
5	13	February 13, 2024	May 21, 2024	17	7.28
6	22	October 15, 2024	May 20, 2025	TBA	TBA

== Episodes ==
=== Backdoor pilot (2019) ===
For the backdoor pilot, "No. overall" and "No. in season" refer to the episode's place in the order of episodes of the parent series FBI.

No. overall	No. in season	Title	Directed by	Written by	Original release date	Prod. code	U.S. viewers (millions)
18	18	"Most Wanted"	Fred Berner	René Balcer	April 2, 2019	FBI118	9.08
When ICE agent Thomas Gilman flees after killing his wife and two children with the explosion destroying his house and leaving one of his neighbors dead and two others wounded, Maggie and OA are called in to investigate the scene with the FBI's New York field office eventually contacting the Fugitive Task Force led by SSA Jess LaCroix to help arrest Gilman while determining the motive for his killings. The episode's story is based on FBI Ten Most Wanted Fugitives "Robert William Fisher".

=== Season 1 (2020) ===
- Julian McMahon, Kellan Lutz, Roxy Sternberg, Keisha Castle-Hughes, and Nathaniel Arcand debut as Supervisory Special Agent Jess LaCroix and his team of Special Agents: Kenny Crosby, Sheryll Barnes, Hana Gibson, and Clinton Skye in the season premiere, "Dopesick".

No. overall	No. in season	Title	Directed by	Written by	Original release date	Prod. code	U.S. viewers (millions)
1	1	"Dopesick"	Fred Berner	René Balcer	January 7, 2020	MW101	7.19
2	2	"Defender"	Nicole Rubio	Richard Sweren	January 14, 2020	MW102	6.51
3	3	"Hairtrigger"	Jim McKay	Story by : Gina Gionfriddo & Jerome Hairston; Teleplay by : Gina Gionfriddo	January 21, 2020	MW106	6.59
4	4	"Caesar"	Fred Berner	Kathy McCormick	January 28, 2020	MW105	6.11
5	5	"Invisible"	Elodie Keene	Dwain Worrell	February 11, 2020	MW107	6.11
6	6	"Prophet"	Rose Troche	Richard Sweren	February 18, 2020	MW108	6.29
7	7	"Ghosts"	Jean de Segonzac	Story by : Gina Gionfriddo & Jerome Hairston; Teleplay by : Gina Gionfriddo	March 10, 2020	MW109	5.99
8	8	"Predators"	Fred Berner	Elizabeth Rinehart	March 17, 2020	MW110	6.44
9	9	"Reveille"	Fred Berner	Ryan Causey	March 24, 2020	MW114	9.49
10	10	"Silkworm"	Ken Girotti	Dwain Worrell	March 31, 2020	MW113	8.10
11	11	"Ironbound"	Alex Chapple	Elizabeth Rinehart	April 14, 2020	MW103	8.95
12	12	"Ride or Die"	John David Cole	Story by : Jerome Hairston & Gina Gionfriddo; Teleplay by : Jerome Hairston	April 14, 2020	MW104	7.16
13	13	"Grudge"	Leslie Libman	Kathy McCormick	April 28, 2020	MW112	6.96
14	14	"Getaway"	Ken Girotti	Story by : Jerome Hairston & Gina Gionfriddo; Teleplay by : Jerome Hairston	May 5, 2020	MW111	6.62

=== Season 2 (2020–21) ===
- YaYa Gosselin (Tali Skye LaCroix) becomes a series regular.
- Nathaniel Arcand (Clinton Skye) departs the series in Episode 3, "Deconflict".
- Miguel Gomez joins the main cast as Special Agent Ivan Ortiz starting with Episode 8, "Vanished".

No. overall	No. in season	Title	Directed by	Written by	Original release date	Prod. code	U.S. viewers (millions)
15	1	"Rampage"	Jim McKay	Richard Sweren	November 17, 2020	MW202	5.38
16	2	"Execute"	Jim McKay	Elizabeth Rinehart	November 24, 2020	MW201	5.69
17	3	"Deconflict"	Elodie Keene	Wendy West	December 8, 2020	MW203	4.92
18	4	"Anonymous"	Deran Sarafian	Spindrift Beck	January 19, 2021	MW204	5.81
19	5	"The Line"	Jean de Segonzac	Dwain Worrell	January 26, 2021	MW205	6.23
20	6	"Dysfunction"	Jim McKay	Melissa Scrivner Love	February 9, 2021	MW206	5.64
21	7	"Winner"	Eric Laneuville	Wendy West & Spindrift Beck	March 2, 2021	MW207	5.73
22	8	"Vanished"	Rose Troche	Elizabeth Rinehart	March 9, 2021	MW208	6.14
23	9	"One-Zero"	Tess Malone	Richard Sweren & Dwain Worrell	March 16, 2021	MW209	6.26
24	10	"Spiderwebs"	Carlos Bernard	Ticona S. Joy & D. Dona Le	April 6, 2021	MW210	6.44
25	11	"Obstruction"	Ken Girotti	Melissa Scrivner Love	April 27, 2021	MW211	5.62
26	12	"Criminal Justice"	Milena Govich	Richard Sweren	May 4, 2021	MW212	5.49
27	13	"Toxic"	Ken Girotti	Gina Gionfriddo & Elizabeth Rinehart	May 11, 2021	MW213	5.79
28	14	"Hustler"	John Polson	Wendy West & Spindrift Beck	May 18, 2021	MW214	5.48
29	15	"Chattaboogie"	Milena Govich	David Hudgins	May 25, 2021	MW215	5.79

=== Season 3 (2021–22) ===
- Alexa Davalos joins the main cast as Special Agent Kristin Gaines.
- Kellan Lutz (Kenny Crosby) departs in Episode 1.
- YaYa Gosselin (Tali Skye LaCroix) departs the series in Episode 10.
- Julian McMahon (Jess LaCroix) departs the series in Episode 14 before his death on July 2nd, 2025.
- Dylan McDermott joins the main cast as Supervisory Special Agent Remy Scott in Episode 17.
- Miguel Gomez (Ivan Ortiz) departs the series in Episode 21.

No. overall	No. in season	Title	Directed by	Written by	Original release date	Prod. code	U.S. viewers (millions)
30	1	"Exposed"	Ken Girotti	Story by : Dick Wolf & David Hudgins & Elizabeth Rinehart; Teleplay by : David Hudgins & Elizabeth Rinehart	September 21, 2021	MW301	7.12
31	2	"Patriots"	Peter Stebbings	Richard Sweren	September 28, 2021	MW302	5.59
32	3	"Tough Love"	Marc Roskin	Stephanie Sengupta	October 5, 2021	MW303	5.65
33	4	"Inherited"	Romeo Tirone	Wendy West	October 12, 2021	MW304	5.50
34	5	"Unhinged"	Ken Girotti	Melissa Scrivner Love	November 2, 2021	MW305	4.97
35	6	"Lovesick"	Jean de Segonzac	Ticona S. Joy	November 9, 2021	MW306	4.88
36	7	"Gladiator"	Tess Malone	Spindrift Beck	November 16, 2021	MW307	5.64
37	8	"Sport of Kings"	Carlos Bernard	Richard Sweren	December 7, 2021	MW308	5.45
38	9	"Run-Hide-Fight"	Ken Girotti	Elizabeth Rinehart	December 14, 2021	MW309	6.86
39	10	"Incendiary"	Milena Govich	D. Dona Le	January 4, 2022	MW310	5.43
40	11	"Hunter"	John Murray	Rickey Cook	January 11, 2022	MW311	5.56
41	12	"El Pincho"	Ludovic Littee	Wendy West	February 1, 2022	MW312	5.91
42	13	"Overlooked"	Milena Govich	Stephanie Sengupta	February 22, 2022	MW313	5.70
43	14	"Shattered"	Lisa Demaine	Elizabeth Rinehart	March 8, 2022	MW314	5.55
44	15	"Incel"	Carlos Bernard	Zach Cannon	March 22, 2022	MW315	5.79
45	16	"Decriminalized"	Tim Busfield	Melissa Scrivner Love	March 29, 2022	MW316	5.84
46	17	"Covenant"	Ken Girotti	David Hudgins & Spindrift Beck	April 12, 2022	MW317	5.43
47	18	"Reaper"	Alex Zakrzewski	Elizabeth Rinehart & D. Dona Le	April 19, 2022	MW318	5.25
48	19	"Whack Job"	Cory Bowles	Richard Sweren & Ryan Causey	April 26, 2022	MW319	5.44
49	20	"Greatest Hits"	Ken Girotti	Stephanie Sengupta & Zach Cannon	May 10, 2022	MW320	5.28
50	21	"Inheritance"	Jean de Segonzac	Gina Gionfriddo & Ticona S. Joy	May 17, 2022	MW321	5.46
51	22	"A Man Without a Country"	Heather Cappiello	Teleplay by : David Hudgins; Story by : David Hudgins & Wendy West	May 24, 2022	MW322	4.77

=== Season 4 (2022–23) ===
- Edwin Hodge joins the main cast as Special Agent Ray Cannon.
- Alexa Davalos (Kristin Gaines) departs the series in the season finale.

No. overall	No. in season	Title	Directed by	Written by	Original release date	Prod. code	U.S. viewers (millions)
52	1	"Iron Pipeline"	Peter Stebbings	Richard Sweren	September 20, 2022	MW402	5.27
53	2	"Taxman"	Ken Girotti	David Hudgins	September 27, 2022	MW401	5.40
54	3	"Succession"	Tess Malone	Wendy West	October 4, 2022	MW403	5.28
55	4	"Gold Diggers"	Don McCutcheon	Stephanie Sengupta	October 11, 2022	MW404	5.41
56	5	"Chains"	Ken Girotti	Elizabeth Rinehart	October 18, 2022	MW405	5.29
57	6	"Patent Pending"	Sudz Sutherland	Ryan Causey	November 15, 2022	MW406	4.74
58	7	"Karma"	Cory Bowles	D. Dona Le	November 22, 2022	MW407	5.11
59	8	"Appeal"	Heather Cappiello	Spindrift Beck	December 13, 2022	MW408	5.00
60	9	"Processed"	Ken Girotti	Melissa Scrivner-Love	January 3, 2023	MW409	4.40
61	10	"False Flag"	Cory Bowles	Zach Cannon	January 10, 2023	MW410	5.01
62	11	"Crypto Wars"	Milena Govich	Christopher Salmanpour	January 24, 2023	MW411	5.20
63	12	"Black Mirror"	Jean de Segonzac	Richard Sweren	February 14, 2023	MW412	4.80
64	13	"Transaction"	Jon Cassar	Khalid A. Moalim	February 21, 2023	MW413	4.72
65	14	"Wanted: America"	Ludovic Littee	Wendy West	February 28, 2023	MW414	4.72
66	15	"Double Fault"	Ken Girotti	D. Dona Le	March 14, 2023	MW415	5.14
67	16	"Imminent Threat – Part Three"	Ken Girotti	Teleplay by : Elizabeth Rinehart; Story by : Rick Eid & Elizabeth Rinehart	April 4, 2023	MW418	6.08
68	17	"The Miseducation of Metcalf 2"	Sharon Lewis	Stephanie SenGupta	April 11, 2023	MW416	5.03
69	18	"Rangeland"	Loren Yaconelli	Richard Sweren & Ryan Causey	April 18, 2023	MW417	5.06
70	19	"Bad Seed"	Ludovic Littee	Spindrift Beck & Chris Salmanpour	April 25, 2023	MW419	5.10
71	20	"These Walls"	Peter Stebbings	David Hudgins & Richard Sweren	May 9, 2023	MW420	5.04
72	21	"Clean House"	Milena Govich	Wendy West & Rickey Cook	May 16, 2023	MW421	5.05
73	22	"Heaven Falling"	Ken Girotti	David Hudgins	May 23, 2023	MW422	4.83

=== Season 5 (2024) ===
- Shantel VanSanten (Nina Chase) becomes a series regular.

No. overall	No. in season	Title	Directed by	Written by	Original release date	Prod. code	U.S. viewers (millions)
74	1	"Above & Beyond"	Ken Girotti	David Hudgins & Elizabeth Rinehart	February 13, 2024	MW501	5.36
75	2	"Footsteps"	Milena Govich	Richard Sweren	February 20, 2024	MW502	4.93
76	3	"Ghost in the Machine"	Peter Stebbings	Ryan Causey	February 27, 2024	MW503	4.67
77	4	"Hollow"	Jean de Segonzac	Wendy West	March 12, 2024	MW504	4.95
78	5	"Desperate"	Ken Girotti	Elizabeth Rinehart	March 19, 2024	MW505	4.74
79	6	"Fouled Out"	Corey Bowles	D. Dona Le	March 26, 2024	MW506	4.49
80	7	"Rendition"	Sharon Lewis	David Hudgins & Chris Salmanpour	April 2, 2024	MW507	4.98
81	8	"Supply Chain"	Lisa Robinson	Richard Sweren	April 9, 2024	MW508	4.66
82	9	"The Return"	Ken Girotti	Khalid A. Moalim	April 16, 2024	MW509	5.03
83	10	"Bonne Terre"	Peter Stebbings	David Hudgins & Wendy West	April 23, 2024	MW510	5.11
84	11	"Radio Silence"	Cory Bowles	Elizabeth Rinehart & D. Dona Le	May 7, 2024	MW511	4.53
85	12	"Derby Day"	Jean de Segonzac	Chris Salmanpour & Ryan Causey	May 14, 2024	MW512	4.55
86	13	"Powderfinger"	Ken Girotti	David Hudgins & Wendy West	May 21, 2024	MW513	4.12

=== Season 6 (2024–25) ===
No. overall	No. in season	Title	Directed by	Written by	Original release date	Prod. code	U.S. viewers (millions)
87	1	"Aquarium Drinker"	Ken Girotti	David Hudgins	October 15, 2024	MW601	4.21
The Fugitive Task Force investigate the death of detective Albert Kelly in what they and the NYPD at first suspect is a gang related hit due to Kelly's scheduled testimony against one. This is however disproven when they discover other victims killed in a similar manner, including the assailant's mother, who had been in a relationship with Kelly; wife and unborn son, who they identify as Gary Muscar. They further learn that he is planning an attack at his college, where he plants a bomb in the canteen and starts sniping students who are protesting against climate change. Scott and Cannon confront Muscar on the rooftops, where he explains how his mental illness developed since he was a child, but he had never acted on his thoughts. As they attempt to apprehend him, Gary commits suicide. Scott's sister prepares to move to Paris for a new job and Scott officially starts a relationship with Abby Deaver.
88	2	"Varsity Blues"	Don McCutcheon	Richard Sweren	October 22, 2024	MW602	4.21
Teenager Zach Stolowitz is kidnapped by his classmates Caitlyn Baker and Brooke Perkins in Madison, New Jersey following the suicide of their friend Maria Tomassi. Seeking to enact revenge against both him and his friend Will Haggerty, they task him to make a deepfake of Will in a similar matter to images spread of Maria prior to her death. The Fugitive Task Force stumbles upon their own challenges of deepfakes when Scott falls victim to one after questioning Haggerty and his father. Things take a turn when the girls accidentally kill Zach after he cries for help and furthermore, Will later holds them at gunpoint in their car, demanding them to take him to Zach. Once the team intercept them, they discover Zach's body in the trunk while also talking Will out of committing suicide. Cannon and Cora grow concerned when they learn that Caleb has skipped football lessons, which the latter later suspects is due to the former and his father's pressure on him to succeed in it.
89	3	"White Buffalo"	Peter Stebbings	Wendy West	October 29, 2024	MW603	3.91
Climate activists Trevor Allen and Emma Culp go on the run after accidentally killing a security guard at a museum following a protest. The duo seek refuge in Pennsylvania with fellow activist Tori Newell. Trevor decides that their next target should be the recently opened pipeline in her area. The Fugitive Task Force intercept them after they hijacked an oil tanker truck and released the gas at an amusement park, but Trevor and Emma escaped. The duo learns from the security supervisor that there exists a secret well that the oil company has yet to publicly reveal. While taking him hostage, they decide that the secret well could serve their interests better. The task force arrives at the pipeline and decide to ambush them, shooting Trevor and Nina talks Emma into surrendering. Nina and Scola face challenges in tackling the former's father when he comes to visit. Nina later makes a stand against him while out eating with him and her sister, making him leave in a fit of rage.
90	4	"Pig Butchering"	Lisa Robinson	Elizabeth Rinehart	November 12, 2024	MW604	4.15
Barnes returns to work and is determined to help 17-year-old Jessica Davis, who scam called her from a calling center in an unknown location. Scott is reluctant to take the case and sensing no other way, Barnes asks Gibson to help her. After finding a middleman to the scammers, they discover a dead body of a caller from the center. Scott then reluctantly accepts the case and brings the whole team onboard. Jessica and her friend Shandy were abducted after attending a job interview and placed at the calling center, which they determine is somewhere in Newark. The Cobbs, who run the center, intensify their search for the mole among the callers until Jessica confesses after Shandy is tortured for information. Before the Cobbs can execute them, the Task Force arrive and infiltrate the center, but the Cobbs escape briefly before being cornered. Struggling to come to terms with her wife and children moving to Washington, D.C., Barnes confides in Gibson about how she has been coping.
91	5	"Money Moves"	Ken Girotti	Ryan Causey	November 19, 2024	MW605	4.80
A group of robbers rob a warehouse in Atlanta, Georgia, before fleeing, one of them is hurt and a security guard killed in the process. The Task Force identify the lead robbers as brothers Mike and Nate Perry, nephews of longtime prisoner Ronald Perry, who gives them intel on them in exchange for a reduced sentence. Following a botched robbery at a pharmacy in South Carolina, the crew target a high secure Charlotte bank facility, trapping themselves inside. The team also learns that Nate’s girlfriend served as the crew’s inside man since the Atlanta robbery. They attempt to negotiate with them, but the crew escape to an airfield in an armored van. After a shootout at the airfield, Scott tries to put the brothers against each other, leading to Nate convincing Mike to surrender. Cora is worried about Caleb seeing his biological father Lou again, which Cannon initially supports, but becomes more doubtful after hearing Lou plans to bring Caleb to a club where he would be considered a minor.
92	6	"Pageantry"	Carlos Bernard	D. Dona Le	December 3, 2024	MW606	4.38
Honduran Miss Globe Lorlly Varela dies of sarin gas poisoning on live television in Philadelphia, which leads the Task Force to her opposition to the Honduran regime which could have led to her death. When a Vietnamese dissident also dies in Brooklyn, the team determines that the killings are a serious of hits done by assassin Harper Dowar. They determine that her next target is the President of Venezuela attending a soccer match in Newark, they race to secure the President and the Venezuelan soccer team. However, things take a turn when Scott learns from Dowar that she is not targeting the president, but rather her replacement on the said mission: her ex-boyfriend Adrien Dubois. Scott reluctantly agrees to work with her until Dubois is arrested, and she is extradited to the Philippines by the CIA for the murder of the Philippine Miss Globe. Gibson and Ethan face growing challenges in their relationship due to the latter's job, but Gibson later discovers him using Oxycodone and possibly seeing a mistress.
93	7	"Highway to Hell"	David Barrett	Rickey Cook	December 10, 2024	MW607	4.27
District Attorney Merritt Pasternak is executed alongside her husband and a shop worker, which the Task Force soon learn is related to her husband's work within Wall Street trading. Furthermore, his company had links to a shell company linked to a local Queens biker gang and a money laundering scheme. The gang has sent two of their members to locate the company CFO Jeff Scholes, who they believe ripped them off. Once the team corner the driver, they learn that he is undercover ATF agent Greg Ashton. Working with the ATF to locate Scholes, things take a turn when Ashton goes rogue and takes the money on Scholes' flash drive for himself. The team go after Ashton and his former partner, Vic Kolchin, to a warehouse, where Kolchin is killed and Cannon is captured by Ashton. Nina manages to talk him into surrendering before he can flee. Scott is reunited with his old friend Blake but later has second thoughts about him. Despite these challenges, he decides to give him another chance.
94	8	"The Electric Company"	Cory Bowles	Richard Sweren	December 17, 2024	MW608	4.87
The Fugitive Task Force heads to the Sundown county of Archer in Virginia to investigate a possible serial killer following the deaths of several people by taser and ensuing heart attacks. They quickly identify the tasers to be utilized by Deputy Eli Nelson of the Sheriff's Office, which becomes the beginning of a round of intimidation against the team, especially Barnes and Cannon, and people involved in the case they're investigating, by the sheriff and his deputies. With the local district attorney unwilling act against the deputies' actions, the team ask the State Attorney General for warrants against the department after a person of interest is killed. It's revealed that Nelson killed people he held accountable for putting his father in a wheelchair. Following a standoff between him, his partner and the Task Force, the team inevitably arrests the sheriff as well. Scott is apprehensive about April being willing to live away from his apartment so she can stay closer to the courthouse for a postponed trial, which he gradually finds tolerable despite his reservations.
95	9	"Moving On"	Jon Cassar	D. Dona Le	January 28, 2025	MW609	4.20
Following the death of Postal worker Vicky Collins in an arson attack, several other victims either meet or narrowly avoid a similar fate around Philadelphia and New York City. The team learn that they all had family members who worked with the Philadelphia PD or Fire Department during the 1985 MOVE bombing and that the arsonist, Gerry Colworth, lost his family in a spillover fire. Coupled with his recent divorce, sole custody and losing his job, they suspect this triggered Colworth to commit his arson attacks. As he attacks the home of the former police commissioner's granddaughter, the team corner him escaping from a roof he was sniping from, with Cannon and Barnes talking him into surrendering. Nina's sister, Tink, asks her for advice in confronting her husband Brett about lying about work applications. Nina later learns from her father that Tink and Brett had a fight and decides to go to Houston to be with them while Tink recovers.
96	10	"Ars Moriendi"	Ken Girotti	David Hudgins	February 4, 2025	MW610	3.96
After meeting at a diner, the team fall witness to a murder in broad daylight and chase the perpetrator on foot and by vehicle across the city before he eventually escapes. With the help of the cyber division's Jill Potts, they learn that the perpetrator, Jay Lark, is a part of an online community which portrays murders as a sick game of who gets the most kills. They also track down his friend, Jarrett Bahri, who he competes with for the most points and kills. With more victims appearing, including a cop, the team narrow their search down to Jarrett's home after Jay was spotted fleeing to his residence from his own. Jarrett turns the tables on Jay and holds him hostage and grows more erratic despite attempts of de-escalation. They breach his basement just as he prepares to kill Jay. Barnes and Potts bond over their shared experiences with former partners and the latter asks her out for a drink, which later leads to them sleeping together.
97	11	"Do You Realize??"	Milena Govich	Wendy West & Bryce Cracknell	February 11, 2025	MW611	4.02
14-year-old Brianne Moten is kidnapped from her foster home in Philadelphia after her foster parents are tortured and killed. The team quickly learn that she was kidnapped by 19-year-old Jake Williams, whom she had a brotherly bond with during their previous time in foster care together. As the team try to catch up with them, the duo try to reach out to their younger foster sister Sydney, who they eventually learn has been moved into a new home. When they reach her home, Brianne learns that she'd rather stay with her new family, whom she feels more at home with, all the while Jake holds the foster parents hostage until the team arrives. Jake keeps Gibson hostage, and she manages to talk him into surrendering, relating to his experiences in foster care and her own adoption. Cannon's father helps him and Cora with building a new bookshelf but hurts himself when falling of the ladder. After a trip to the hospital, they learn he has a serious condition which will require immediate surgery.
98	12	"68 Seconds"	Sharon Lewis	Elizabeth Rinehart	February 18, 2025	MW612	4.39
Scott's ex-girlfriend, judge April Brooks is sexually assaulted after holding a lecture at a college in Lewiston, Maine. Scott asks the rest of the team to assist in the investigation and they learn that the rapist has been active for at least a decade and there are many victims spanning different states. They come close to catching him in a bird sanctuary, but he narrowly escapes, but they also rescue another victim in his van. They later discover his identity, Patrick Henderson, through a bone marrow transplant he had. When his girlfriend learns about his actions, he attacks her and escapes, furthermore aggravated by one of his earlier victims speaking out on a blog. Henderson returns to the Lewiston college pledging to kill Brooks as threatened earlier, and the team rush to secure her and stopping him for good. Scott also prepares to take the next step in his relationship with Abby, proposing they go on a vacation to Italy, something she is hesitant about at first before being convinced.
99	13	"Greek Tragedy"	Ludo Littee	Ryan Causey	February 25, 2025	MW613	4.17
Two sorority girls are tortured and killed after returning home from a party in Charlottesville, Virginia, which puts the team on course to learn that the fraternity led by one of the victims' boyfriend, Nick Turpin, are involved in drug trafficking of alprazolam and are in debt to their dealer, Kimani Lyons, who they deduce was responsible for the murders. When Lyons kidnaps one of the frat boys to make him produce more alprazolam for him, Nick calls on his frat to join him in rescuing him. The team works with D.C. police to stop both Nick and Kimani at a party in Gateway, preventing either of them from harming each other any further. Ethan returns to Gibson and confesses to her that he is an addict and that he furthermore has been blackmailed by his dealer, Jamie Dutton. Gibson decides to help him get into rehab and threatens Jamie with federal charges should she continue to blackmail Ethan. Additionally, Ethan confesses his love for Gibson, but she is unsure how to react to it.
100	14	"100%"	Ken Girotti	Wendy West & Jon-Alexander Genson	March 11, 2025	MW614	4.36
While accompanying Ethan to rehab, he and Gibson and five other people find themselves taken hostage by veterans Dani Harrigan and Carver Fleck after the duo learns that the latter's disability benefits papers have been lost in the VA's system. Gibson sends an SOS to the Fugitive Task Force, who are soon joined by the hostage negotiations team and the NYPD. Dani allows for medical attention to a wounded guard, food to be delivered and releasing one hostage as part of the negotiations but gradually begins to lose patience due to her demands for Carver not being met. The hostages are relocated twice, and Ethan tries to sympathize with them over their shared war experiences. After the FBI tries to breach, Dani plants a bomb to scare them off. Ethan takes the fall for Gibson when media gets wind of an FBI agent being held hostage, however, he manages to talk Dani down just as the FBI breach the building for the second time. Gibson also finally acknowledges Ethan's love for her, which she reciprocates.
101	15	"Four Bodies"	Milena Govich	Richard Sweren	March 18, 2025	MW615	4.30
Following a late-night murder, the Task Force are tasked to assist the NYPD in tracking a suspected serial killer whose victims share a similar M.O. Determining that all the victims were men and killed after going to clubs at night, they identify the killer with the help from a surviving victim. The killer, Mia Travis, is revealed to be influenced by the feminist 4B movement and taking the principles to the next level by killing men she deems predatory. They learn from her therapist that she is targeting her former music teacher, Marcus Everett, who groomed her when she was fifteen. They race to Everett's house in Boston and hear Everett's confession before talking Mia into surrendering. Nina learns that her sister Tink, has allowed her abusive husband Brett to move into her house again despite what he has done. Additionally, Tink asks if she can help pay their mortgage, which Nina is hesitant about until learning that Scola already gave Tink a check to pay for it, upsetting her over not being consulted.
102	16	"Toxic Behavior"	Craig Langus	Elizabeth Rinehart	April 1, 2025	MW616	4.28
St. Michael's Hospital is put into overdrive when two patients are hospitalized following poison attacks, which the Task Force investigates. They determine that the assailant utilized DNM poison, which doesn't have a cure, to poison the victims and that all of them seem to be unrelated to each other. The assailant releases a ransom demanding $10 million or more people will die. The team investigate hospital staff who could have access to poisons to make DNM, determining that orderly Cormac McClure was responsible. McClure has been targeting people he holds accountable to be a part of a wider societal problem. His son Jason has been tasked to continue his work; the team are forced to kill Cormac when he wields a gun at them. They chase Jason to a water tower, resulting in a standoff before Cannon talks him down. Scott and Abby are reunited after the latter has been spending time away at her job, and Scott invites her to Blake's bar so they can catch up.
103	17	"Gut Job"	Ludo Littee	Rickey Cook	April 8, 2025	MW617	4.41
Reality star Jake Carman wakes up in his Philadelphia home to find his wife Monica dead and a bloodied hammer in his hands. Knowing his innocence, he goes on the run to find whoever killed her. Concurrently, the Fugitive Task Force are assigned his case and question people who knew the couple and their history. Carman learns that Monica had an affair with their Haddonfield pastor Westin Tillis and heads out to find him, but before he can reach him, Tillis' brother-in-law Olin kills him to cover up loose ends. Carman tracks down Olin and confronts him about Monica's affair, additionally learning that she was pregnant. The team arrives just before Olin can kill Carman and attempts to escape, but they stop him before he can go too far. Barnes feels inferior to Jill Potts' friend group when she takes her out to meet them. When Barnes learns of an open position in Washington, D. C., she begins to ponder if she should apply for it so she can be closer to her children.
104	18	"Trust"	Loren Yaconelli	Ryan Causey	April 15, 2025	MW619	4.41
Socialite Vanessa van Dyke is drowned in her bathtub in her Newport home and as the Fugitive Task Force investigate the circumstances of her death, they discover a complicated web of an internal family conspiracy. They learn that her husband, Jay Bradford, was having an affair with their nanny Amelia, and the two conspired to frame her death on the club bartender Kevin Mulvaney and stage his death as suicide. Not believing this, Scott shifts focus towards the couple on the run with the son George. They come close to stop them at the yacht club before the duo escapes to Mystic, Connecticut, intending to steal another boat and heading for The Bahamas. As they struggle to start the boat, the Task Force attempt to talk them into surrendering, with Amelia surrendering first after learning about Jay's neglect of his firstborn son and Jay subsequently surrenders as well. Barnes confides in Gibson about her possible new job and later has her job interview, receiving high praise and acclaim and an unofficial offer for the position.
105	19	"Starman"	Ken Girotti	Wendy West	April 22, 2025	MW620	4.07
Astronaut Ace Colwin is abducted from his home in Lancaster, Pennsylvania in the midst of a poker game with friends. As the team takes the case, they later discover Colwin's body and not too long afterwards dentist Hank McCallahan is abducted under similar circumstances but manages to escape. They determine that both men were subscribed to the online porn site FansAllowed and model Leah Miller, who they also suspect could be underage. To contact her, they arrange a meeting with her but also learn that she's only on the site to help a friend pay up for a debt. Scott, Nina and Cannon head to her father Jacob Miller's horse farm and end up in a brawl with him before being forced to kill him. Gibson and Barnes intercept Leah when she arrives and decides not to charge her for using a fake ID. Scott and Abby decide to open a restaurant together but come to disagreements about its color scheme. He eventually decides to adhere more to her wishes than his own.
106	20	"Trash Day"	Peter Stebbings	D. Dona Le	May 6, 2025	MW618	4.14
Mayor of Paterson Jocelyn Yang is kidnapped before meeting an old friend. As the Fugitive Task Force investigates, Yang's chief of staff is killed after yielding to a ransom demand for her release. They quickly determine that she was in on her own abduction by Josh Dao, the son of local sanitation mogul Peter Dao. She however ditches him after a failed robbery and the team question him, but he refuses to cooperate, but he reluctantly does once his mother also winds up dead. Yang is revealed to have gone to Peter and that the two had an affair and plan to run away together. After another corpse is discovered as a ruse by the duo, they track them down to Chinatown in New York and corner them in an alleyway. Peter resists and uses Yang as a human shield, forcing the team to shoot them both. With Cannon's father back from hospital, he proposes that he, Cannon, and Caleb, go for a camping trip, which becomes more improvised after the weather turns against them.
107	21	"Souls on ICE"	Cory Bowles	Rickey Cook & Bryce Cracknell	May 13, 2025	MW621	4.12
When a church in Newark is raided by masked ICE agents, the Fugitive Task Force investigates the case and quickly learns that the raid was conducted by a group disguised as ICE agents in order to target three men, two of which are taken captive and the third released. The team manages to halt their efforts when they attempt to raid a refugee center, with one of their members being arrested, but he refuses to cooperate. The team later learns that the group were Afrikaner neo nazis who targeted illegal immigrants to harvest their organs and sell them to willing donors. They infiltrate the disused pet clinic they operate from and take down all the members when they attempt to escape and resist, also saving the surviving captive. Barnes is officially offered the position in Washington, D. C., with Scott having mixed feelings about the matter, but still supports her decision. He also ponders about his own future with the FBI, weighing it against possibly helping Abby with their restaurant permanently.
108	22	"The Circle Game"	Ken Girotti	David Hudgins & Richard Sweren	May 20, 2025	MW622	4.24
A federal worker is killed during a protest against federal layoffs. The team go after Judy King and Saquon Ball, former Department of Education workers who sought to send a message. Ball holds King and his aunt hostage at the latter's house before King and his aunt escape. When he resists, the team is forced to shoot him. As King and the aunt surrender, members of the government agency Bureau of Government Oversight steal codes from the NCA. The team realizes they are dealing with cyber terrorism as infrastructure temporarily fails throughout the East Coast. They follow one of the members, Kyle McConnelly, to the rendezvous with his partner, Patesh Karna, but shoot him when he resists. Karna holds a priest hostage, but Scott pushes him into surrendering and securing the codes. Nina forgives her father for his earlier outburst. Cannon and Cora are expecting a child. Scott announces that he is retiring and that Barnes will succeed him as team leader as they all gather to celebrate the opening of his and Abby's restaurant.

== See also ==
- FBI (franchise)
- List of FBI episodes
- List of FBI: International episodes
