= Under the Stadium Lights =

- Directed by: Todd Randall
- Based on: Brother's Keeper by: Al Pickett; Chad Mitchell
- Produced by: Hamid Torabpour; Camille Torabpour; Mark Smith; Charles Bridwell; Stelio Savante
- Starring: Milo Gibson; Glenn Morshower; Noel Gugliemi; Carter Redwood; Acoryé White; Adrian Favela; Germain Arroyo; Nicholas Delgado; Eddie George; Abigail Hawk; Bucky Covington; Laurence Fishburne
- Cinematography: Joseph Loeffler
- Edited by: Todd Randall
- Music by: Erick Schroder
- Production company: Winter State Entertainment
- Distributed by: Saban Films
- Release date: June 4, 2021
- Country: United States
- Language: English

Under the Stadium Lights is a 2021 sports drama film directed by Todd Randall and starring Milo Gibson and Laurence Fishburne. It is based on the nonfiction book Brother's Keeper by Al Pickett and Chad Mitchell. The film follows the players, coach, and team chaplain of a high school football team in Abilene, Texas.

It was released in select theaters and on video on demand in the United States on June 4, 2021 by Saban Films.

== Cast ==
- Laurence Fishburne as Harold Christian, who was somewhat of a local celebrity in Abilene and owned a restaurant (Harold's BBQ) which fed the players each Thursday night during the season.
- Milo Gibson as Chad Mitchell, the team chaplain and author of the novel this film is based on.
- Abigail Hawk as Ashley Mitchell, Chad's wife.
- Adrian Favela as Anthony Carriola
- Carter Redwood as Ronnell Sims
- Acoryé White as Herschel Sims
- Germain Arroyo as Augustine Barrientes
- Glenn Morshower as Steve Warren
- Noel Gugliemi as Albert
- Eddie George as Ronnell Sims Sr.
- Bucky Covington
- Ava Justin as Patron
- Gwen Ruhoff as Patron
- Bruce Purcell as Patron

== Production ==
Principal photography wrapped before the COVID-19 pandemic and the film is now in post-production. Production began in Minnesota in 2018 and wrapped up filming in Abilene, Texas in early 2019. While shooting in Abilene the crew filmed at popular local destinations such as Abilene Zoological Gardens, Paramount Theatre, Abilene High School, and Shotwell Stadium.

== Release ==
In November 2020, Saban Films acquired North American and U.K. rights to the film and renamed Under the Stadium Lights. It was released in select theaters and on digital June 4, 2021. It was released on DVD on August 3, 2021.

== Reception ==
On the review aggregator website Rotten Tomatoes, 11% of 18 critics' reviews are positive, with an average rating of 3.6/10. Metacritic, which uses a weighted average, assigned the film a score of 31 out of 100, based on 5 critics, indicating "generally unfavorable" reviews. Alan Ng of Film Threat rated the film a 7 out of 10. Nell Minow of RogerEbert.com awarded the film two stars. Ty Burr of The Boston Globe awarded the film one star.
