= Carter Redwood =

American actor

- Born: February 18, 1992 (age 34)
- Occupation: Actor
- Years active: 2012–present

Carter Redwood is an American actor. He is best known for playing SA Andre Raines in the police procedural series FBI: International.

== Early life ==
Redwood was raised in the Hill District of Pittsburgh, Pennsylvania to Carl and Tawyna Redwood. At age 13 he made his debut as a director with two-act plays for the Pittsburgh Playwrights Company and a one-act play for the Pittsburgh New Works Theater Company. As a sixth-grader, he won first place in the Pittsburgh Public Theater Shakespeare monologue competition for “Othello.” He won this competition again between 2004 and 2009. In 2009, he took his first trip out of the United States, traveling to Katowice, Poland, to participate in the Festival of Americas, where he performed in a stage production of “Angry Black Man Poetry.” In 2014 he graduated from the Carnegie Mellon University and won the He cites African-American playwright August Wilson as his main influence as well mentor and friend Mark Clayton Southers of Pittsburgh Playwrights Theatre for helping him discover his passion for acting.

== Career ==
He played Nick in the romantic drama film Premature and had an 2 episode arc on the musical drama series Rise playing Bump. One of his first big film roles came playing Crockett in the war film The Yellow Birds. He had a recurring role as Pedro Guzman in the drama miniseries The Long Road Home. He made an appearance in two episodes of the comedy drama series Orange Is the New Black. He played Ray Ray Kennedy one of the lead characters in the drama series 5th Ward The Series. His best known role so far has been playing SA Andre Raines in the police procedural series FBI: International.

== Personal life ==
In 2023 alongside his brother Maurice Redwood he was given the honour of August Wilson House Fellows by Duquesne University.

== Filmography ==
=== Film ===
| Year | Title | Role | Notes |
|---|---|---|---|
| 2012 | Mafia | Soldier#2 | |
| 2013 | Seventeen Days | Drae | |
| 2013 | Underdogs | Damien Taylor | |
| 2013 | Robinson | Brandon | Short |
| 2013 | Sandman 118 | Miles | Short |
| 2014 | Not Cool | JC | |
| 2014 | Blood First | Rico | |
| 2015 | The Recall | Jamal Dawson | Short |
| 2016 | The Transfiguration | Andre | |
| 2017 | The Yellow Birds | Lenny Crockett | |
| 2018 | Interference | Mike | Short |
| 2019 | Premature | Nick | |
| 2020 | I Gotta Dookie | Dj | Short |
| 2020 | Respite | Dan Rogers | |
| 2021 | Under the Stadium Lights | Ronnell Sims | |
| 2021 | Mother's Milk | Sparrow | |

=== Television ===
| Year | Title | Role | Notes |
|---|---|---|---|
| 2013 | Redwood Time | Carter Redwood | 10 episodes |
| 2015 | Madam Secretary | MPD Officer | Episode; Chains of Command |
| 2015 | The Good Wife | Jamir | Episode; The Deconstruction |
| 2016 | Blue Bloods | Office Eric Russell | Episode; Blowback |
| 2017 | The Long Road Home | Spc Pedro Guzman | 8 episodes |
| 2018 | Rise | Bump | 2 episodes |
| 2017-2018 | Orange Is the New Black | Bladt | 2 episodes |
| 2020 | 5th Ward The Series | Ray Ray Kennedy | 6 episodes |
| 2022 | Winning Time: The Rise of the Lakers Dynasty | Brian | Episode; Is That All There Is |
| 2023 | FBI | FBI SA Andre Raines | Episode; Imminent Threat:Part Two |
| 2021-2025 | FBI: International | FBI SA Andre Raines | 78 episodes |
| 2026 | Public Interest | James | In Production |
