= Herschel Sims =

American football player and coach (born 1991)

Current position
- Title: Assistant coach
- Team: Houston Christian
- Conference: Southland

Biographical details
- Born: September 17, 1991 (age 34); Abilene, Texas, U.S.

Playing career
- 2011: Oklahoma State
- 2012: Lamar
- 2013–2015: Abilene Christian
- Position: Running back

Coaching career (HC unless noted)
- 2017–2020: North Texas (GA - Running Backs)
- 2021–2022: SMU (OA)
- 2023–present: Houston Christian (AHC)

Herschel Sims (born September 17, 1991) is an American former football running back who is currently an assistant coach at Houston Christian University. He played college football at Oklahoma State, Lamar University and Abilene Christian University.

== High school ==
Sims began high school football with the Abilene High School Eagles, who won the 2009 5A State Championship (Texas), against the Katy High School Tigers. He began playing for the Oklahoma State Cowboys in the 2011 season. Sporting News ranked him as the number 14 best college recruit. Rivals.com said that he was the fourth best back in the country. In 2010, part of Sims' final high school football season was profiled on the MTV documentary series, World of Jenks. He played in the 2011 U.S. Army All-American Bowl.

The 2021 film Under the Stadium Lights which focuses on the Abilene High Eagles' 2009 season features Sims as portrayed by Acoryé White. Sims was not active in the film and provided very little support to the actors involved.

== Recruiting ==
One of the most sought after signatures in the 2010 class Sims pledged early to Oklahoma State, but was frequently listed as a soft commitment. Texas A&M and TCU also recruited him, but Sims fended them off only to be reportedly mulling a late offer from Auburn. However, he stuck to his original commitment and signed with Oklahoma State.

- Scout ranked him No. 5 among America's backs and as the No. 6 player in Texas.
- Ranked by Rivals.com as the second best all-purpose running back in the country, the No. 8 player in Texas and No. 73 overall recruit in America
- First-team Texas Super Team by Texas Football.
- First-team Associated Press all-stater and as a junior was the Texas 5A offensive player of the year.
- A member of the SuperPrep's national Elite 50, checking in at No. 39
- US Army All-American

== Oklahoma State ==
Reported in June 2011 to summer training camp at 208 pounds.

Played his first collegiate game against Kansas. Sims scored his first touchdown against the Jayhawks as well. He had two 100-yard games against Baylor and Texas Tech. He racked up 242 yards on just 31 carries, an average of nearly 7.8 yards per carry.

Sims has been accused of stealing $700 from a teammate. He was dismissed from the team on June 1, 2012. On June 5, 2012, he was charged with two felony counts of second-degree forgery.
