= The Transfiguration (film) =

- Film poster
- Directed by: Michael O'Shea
- Written by: Michael O'Shea
- Produced by: Susan Leber
- Starring: Eric Ruffin
- Cinematography: Sung Rae Cho
- Edited by: Kathryn J. Schubert
- Music by: Margaret Chardiet
- Production company: Transfiguration Productions
- Release dates: 14 May 2016 (Cannes); 21 April 2017
- Running time: 97 minutes
- Country: United States
- Language: English

The Transfiguration is a 2016 American horror drama film written and directed by Michael O'Shea. It was selected to be screened in the Un Certain Regard section at the 2016 Cannes Film Festival. The film was released in the United Kingdom on April 21, 2017.

== Plot ==
Milo is a 14-year-old boy who believes himself to be a vampire, and struggles with remorse over his kills. He keeps a visual journal containing rules of vampirism that he must follow, and hoards a secret stash of cash stolen from his numerous victims. After ambushing a man in a public public restroom, he leaves for his home, public housing in Brooklyn, New York where he lives with his older brother, Lewis. Lewis has refused to tell Milo where their mother is buried, as, before the events of the film, he walked in on him drinking the blood from her freshly slit wrists after her suicide.

While on a walk, Milo encounters his new neighbor Sophie—with whom he had become acquainted with the night before—as a group of drunken teenage boys are gang raping her. Sophie, like Milo, is an [orphan], and lives with her grandfather who regularly beats her. Once the boys leave, Sophie begins cutting herself and Milo leans in towards Sophie's bloody arm before she stops him. Sophie admits to having contemplated suicide, and in response Milo cryptically tells her that he could not do so because it is "against the rules", alluding to the contents of his visual journal. Sophie finds him strange, yet endearing, and they return to Milo's house. When Milo shows Sophie a video of lambs being slaughtered, she abruptly leaves, though they soon reconcile. He visits the park where he sleeps beneath a bridge and ambushes a homeless man and drinking his blood.

Milo invites Sophie to his house, where they watch Nosferatu. Sophie claims Twilight is a better film and suggests Milo watches it, later gifting him a copy of the first Twilight novel. Sophie tracks down Milo's mother's grave and she and Milo visit it.

Later, when a wealthy young white couple ask Milo if he can help them acquire "C" or "molly", Milo leads the boyfriend to the basement of a nearby building. This location is revealed to be the meeting place of a neighborhood gang that frequently torments Milo. Offended at the boyfriend's expectation of drugs, the gang kills him as Milo watches through the window. The police pick up Milo and inquire about a recent crime, telling Milo that if he does not tell the police what he knows about the crime, they will tell the neighborhood gang that he is a snitch. The police then escort Milo back home. The gang, having seen this, grow distrustful of Milo.

Sophie and Milo consummate their relationship and live together blissfully in Milo's apartment for a few days until Sophie stumbles across Milo's hunting journal. Shaken, she leaves. In the mean time, Milo stalks a man to his home, exsanguinating him and his young daughter before stealing some fine china. On the way home, Milo weeps and contemplates jumping off of a tall building.

The next day, Milo gives Andre, the leader of the gang, his collection of goods stolen from his victims, ostensibly to regain his trust. However, Milo then covertly visits a police station and frames the gang for his murders. In therapy, he expresses a newly positive outlook, and, after buying her flowers, takes Sophie on a date at Coney Island. At night, sitting beneath the docks at the beach, he imagines killing her and sucking the blood out of her neck. Upon departure, he gives her a lump sum of cash so that she move in with her cousin in Alabama. She asks him to come with her, but he refuses and flees. At home, he watches a police shootout during which the entire gang is arrested.

At home, the usually taciturn Lewis comforts an anxious Milo, and reminisces about their mother, marking the first time Lewis has spoken about her since her death. The next morning, Lewis asks Milo if Milo then goes for a walk, where he is quickly gunned down by friends of the gang members he had arrested. Unaware that he has died, Sophie unsuccessfully tries to contact Milo before boarding the bus to Alabama alone.

As Milo is bagged and autopsied, Sophie reads a letter from Milo that he had left in her bag. In it, he reveals that he read Twilight, but "thought it sucked", and states that he has given the topic of vampire suicide more thought. While he maintains that vampires cannot kill themselves in the conventional sense, he elaborates, contextualizing his most recent actions to the viewer. He explains that he believes that a vampire could kill itself indirectly by orchestrating something that it knew would result in death, especially if motivated by a desire, but inability, to not hurt others. The film ends with Milo's freshly buried casket.

== Cast ==
- Eric Ruffin as Milo
- Chloe Levine as Sophie
- Aaron Moten as Lewis
- Carter Redwood as Andre
- Danny Flaherty as Mike
- Larry Fessenden as Drunk Man
- Lloyd Kaufman as Hobo
- James Lorinz as Detective
- Victor Pagan as Deli Regular
- Anna Friedman as Stacey

== Reception ==
On review aggregator Rotten Tomatoes, the film holds an approval rating of 85%, based on 55 reviews with an average rating of 6.6/10. The website's critical consensus reads, "The Transfiguration tells a quieter, more deliberately paced tale than genre fans might expect, but for those with the patience to let it sink in, it offers its own rewards." On Metacritic, the film has a weighted average rating of 65 out of 100, based on 16 reviews, indicating "generally favorable reviews".
