= Alex Zakrzewski =

Television director and cinematographer

- Born: Alexander Zakrzewski
- Occupation(s): Television director, cinematographer
- Years active: 1995–present

Alexander Zakrzewski is an American television director and cinematographer. He has directed episodes of Cold Case, Law & Order: Criminal Intent, Law & Order: Special Victims Unit, Numb3rs and The Wire, and has also worked on several Tom Fontana produced shows including Homicide: Life on the Street, Oz and The Jury. Prior to his episodic work, he shot documentaries for independent film makers and US networks, including several for Harpo Productions, where he developed a reputation for fluid, handheld work.

For The Wire, Zakrzewski directed Season 3, Episode 9, "Slapstick", in 2004. He returned in 2006 to direct the ninth episode of the fourth season, "Know Your Place". Show runner David Simon, who first worked with Zakrzewski on Homicide: Life On the Street, praised Zakrzewski's work on The Wire's restaurant scene between Howard "Bunny" Colvin and his students in the episode.

== Filmography ==
=== Director ===
Year	Show	Episode	Notes
2025	Boston Blue	"History"	Season 1, episode 3
2025	FBI: International	"The Kill Floor"	Season 4, episode 9
2024	FBI	"Family Affair"	Season 6, episode 10
2024	FBI: International	"Magpie"	Season 3, episode 3
2023	FBI	"Obligation"	Season 5, episode 18
2023	FBI: International	"Indefensible"	Season 2, episode 13
2023	FBI: International	"BHITW"	Season 2, episode 10
2023	Law & Order: Organized Crime	"The Wild and the Innocent"	Season 3, episode 15
2022	Bosch: Legacy	"Message in a Bottle"	Season 1, episode 3
2022	Bosch: Legacy	"Plan B"	Season 1, episode 5
2022	FBI: Most Wanted	"Reaper"	Season 3, episode 18
2022	FBI	"Kayla"	Season 4, episode 21
2022	FBI	"Protective Details"	Season 4, episode 16
2021	FBI: International	"Trying to Grab Smoke"	Season 1, episode 7
2021	FBI: International	"The Soul of Chess"	Season 1, episode 4
2021	Bosch	"Brazen"	Season 7, episode 1
2021	Bosch	"Sabes Demasiado"	Season 7, episode 3
2021	Bosch	"Jury's Still Out"	Season 7, episode 5
2021	Bosch	"Workaround"	Season 7, episode 7
2020	Bosch	"Good People on Both Sides"	Season 6, episode 2
2020	Stumptown	"The Dex Files"	Season 1, episode 17
2020	Stumptown	"Reality Checks Don't Bounce"	Season 1, episode 10
2019	Bosch	"Two Kinds of Truth"	Season 5, episode 1
2019	Bosch	"Pill Shills"	Season 5, episode 2
2019	FBI	"Codename: Ferdinand"	Season 2, episode 8
2019	The InBetween	"The Length Of The River"	Season 1, episode 6
2019	City on a Hill	"From Injustice Came the Way to Describe Justice"	Season 1, episode 5
2019	Reef Break	"Pilot"	Season 1, episode 1
2018	Bosch	"Devil in the House"	Season 4, episode 3
2018	Bosch	"The Coping"	Season 4, episode 5
2018	Daredevil	"Upstairs/Downstairs"	Season 3, episode 8
2018	Animal Kingdom	"The Center Will Hold"	Season 3, episode 3
2018	The Crossing	"The Androcle Option"	Season 1, episode 10
2017	Bosch	"God Sees"	Season 3, episode 3
2017	Bosch	"Blood Under the Bridge"	Season 3, episode 5
2017	Mercy Street	"Unknown Soldier"	Season 2, episode 5
2016	Bosch	"Trunk Music"	Season 2, episode 1
2016	Bosch	"The Thing About Secrets"	Season 2, episode 2
2016	Bosch	"Follow the Money"	Season 2, episode 8
2016	The Man in the High Castle	"Loose Lips"	Season 2, episode 8
2015	Bosch	"Chapter Seven: Lost Boys"	Season 1, episode 7
2015	Bosch	"Chapter Nine: The Magic Castle"	Season 1, episode 9
2011	Treme	"Santa Claus, Do You Ever Get the Blues?"	Season 2, episode 4
2010	Memphis Beat	"One Night of Sin"	Season 1, episode 5
2010	The Good Wife	"Bad"	Season 1, episode 13
2010	Blue Bloods	Season 1-14	
2008	Life on Mars	"Have You Seen Your Mother, Baby, Standing in the Shadows"	Season 1, episode 4
2008	Swingtown	"Running on Empty"	Season 1, episode 10
2008	Numb3rs	"High Exposure"	Season 5, episode 1
2008	Numb3rs	"Pay to Play"	Season 4, episode 17
2008	CSI: NY	"Enough"	Season 5, episode 6
2008	Cold Case	"Shore Leave	Season 6, episode 5
2008	Cold Case	"Bad Reputation"	Season 5, episode 16
2007	Cane	"One Man Is an Island"	Season 1, episode 7
2007	Tell Me You Love Me	"1.8"	Season 1, episode 8
2007	Smith	"Six"	Season 1, episode 6
2007	The Unit	"The Outsiders"	Season 2, episode 19
2007	Cold Case	"Thrill Kill"	Season 5, episode 1
2007	Cold Case	"Stalker"	Season 4, episode 24
2007	Cold Case	"8:03 am"	Season 4, episode 14
2007	Numb3rs	"Tabu"	Season 4, episode 8
2007	Numb3rs	"Hollywood Homicide"	Season 4, episode 2
2007	Numb3rs	"Contenders"	Season 3, episode 16
2006	Numb3rs	"Two Daughters"	Season 3, episode 2
2006	Numb3rs	"Double Down"	Season 2, episode 13
2006	Cold Case	"The War at Home"	Season 4, episode 2
2006	Cold Case	"Death Penalty: Final Appeal"	Season 3, episode 20
2006	Cold Case	"Sanctuary"	Season 3, episode 15
2006	The Unit	"Off the Meter"	Season 2, episode 7
2006	The Wire	"Know Your Place"	Season 4, episode 8
2006	Saved	"Cowboys & Independents"	Season 1, episode 6
2005	Numb3rs	"Judgment Call"	Season 2, episode 1
2005	Numb3rs	"Counterfeit Reality"	Season 1, episode 7
2005	The Wire	"Slapstick"	Season 3, episode 9
2005	E-Ring	"Christmas Story"	Season 1, episode 11
2005	Close to Home	"Double Life Wife	Season 1, episode 7
2005	Law & Order: Criminal Intent	"Unchained"	Season 5, episode 4
2005	Law & Order: Criminal Intent	"My Good Name"	Season 4, episode 22
2005	Wanted	Unknown episodes	
2005	CSI: NY	"Recycling"	Season 1, episode 12
2005	Cold Case	"Committed"	Season 3, episode 5
2005	Cold Case	"Creatures of the Night"	Season 2, episode 21
2005	Cold Case	"Revolution"	Season 2, episode 14
2004	Cold Case	"The House"	Season 2, episode 4
2004	Cold Case	"Resolutions"	Season 1, episode 18
2004	CSI: NY	"Three Generations Are Enough"	Season 1, episode 8
2004	The Jury	"Last Rites"	Season 1, episode 5
2004	Law & Order: Special Victims Unit	"Criminal"	
2004	Law & Order: Criminal Intent	"Eosphoros"	Season 4, episode 5
2004	Law & Order: Criminal Intent	"Fico Di Capo"	Season 3, episode 19
2003	Law & Order: Criminal Intent	"Pravda"	Season 3, episode 5
2003	Law & Order: Criminal Intent	"The Gift"	Season 3, episode 3
2003	Law & Order: Criminal Intent	"Con-text"	Season 2, episode 10
2003	10-8: Officers on Duty	"A Hard Day's Night"	Season 1, episode 2
2003	The Handler	Unknown episodes	
2003	Oz	"Exeunt Omnes"	
2003	Law & Order: Special Victims Unit	"Abomination"	
2003	Law & Order: Special Victims Unit	"Futility"	
2003	Law & Order: Special Victims Unit	"Appearances"	
2003	Law & Order: Special Victims Unit	"Pandora"	
2002	Law & Order: Special Victims Unit	"Disappearing Acts"	
2002	Law & Order: Special Victims Unit	"Execution"	
2002	Law & Order: Special Victims Unit	"Protection"	
2002	Oz	"Impotence"	
2002	Oz	"Visitation"	
2002	Boomtown	"Coyote"	
2002	Hack	Unknown episodes	
2002	Crossing Jordan	"Acts of Mercy"	
2001	Law & Order: Special Victims Unit	"Scourge"	
2001	Oz	"Medium Rare"	
2001	The Agency	Unknown episodes	
2000	The Beat	Unknown episodes	

=== Cinematographer ===
- Crime & Punishment (2002)
- The Beat (2000)
- Homicide: Life on the Street (1995–1999)
- Oz (1997)
