= Milena Govich =

American actress

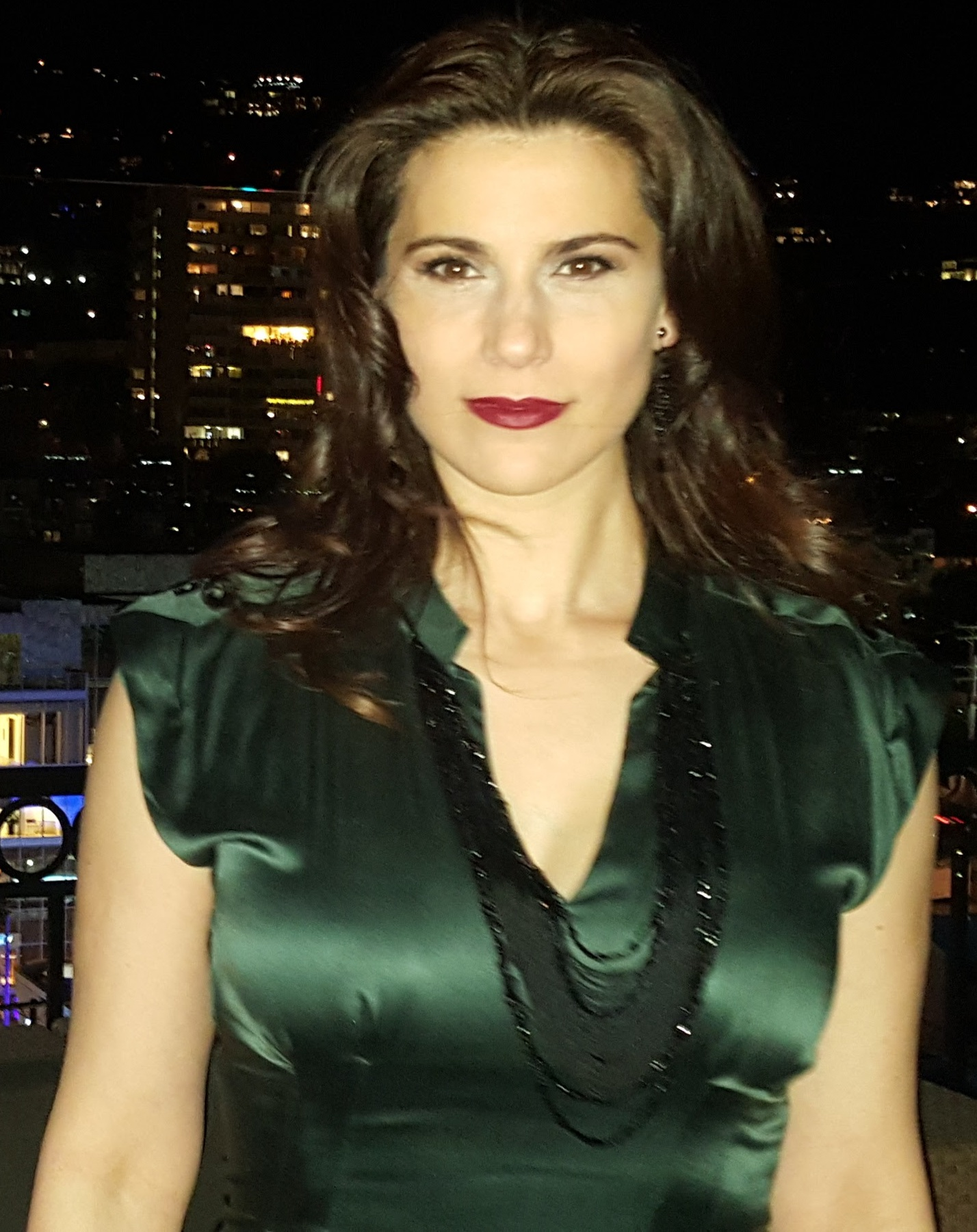
- Govich on January 7, 2016
- Born: October 29, 1976 (age 50); Norman, Oklahoma, U.S.
- Education: University of Central Oklahoma
- Occupations: Actress, director, singer, musician, dancer
- Years active: 2000–present
- Spouse: David Cornue (m. 2003)

Milena Govich (/ˈɡoʊvɪtʃ/ GOH-vitch; Serbian: Милена Говић) (born October 29, 1976) is an American actress, director, singer, dancer, and musician, who may be best known for portraying Detective Nina Cassady for one season on Law & Order (2006–2007).

== Early life and education ==
Milena Govich was born in Norman, Cleveland County, Oklahoma. Both of her parents, Dr. Bruce Michael Govich and Dr. Marilyn Green Govich, were professors of music: her father at the University of Oklahoma and her mother at the University of Central Oklahoma. Her father was Serbian and her mother is of Scottish and English ancestry. Her aunt, Milica Govich, is also an actress who has appeared on Broadway, television, and film such as Law & Order in a recurring role of Trial Judge Leanne Dreben since 2022.

Milena graduated from Norman High School in 1995 as valedictorian of her class. She followed her academic parents by graduating from the University of Central Oklahoma in 1999 once again graduating valedictorian with a double-degree in performance and pre-medical studies, and a minor in dance and violin. After graduation, Govich moved to New York City to pursue an acting career.

== Career ==
Govich has appeared on Broadway in the musical revival of Cabaret, joining the 1998–2004 production in December 2000. She began in the role of Lulu, featuring her singing, dancing, and playing violin, and was the understudy and eventual replacement for the lead role, Sally Bowles. Govich also performed on Broadway in the 2002 musical revival of The Boys from Syracuse and in the musical Good Vibrations. She starred as Millie Dillmount in the first regional production of Thoroughly Modern Millie. In July 2012, Govich starred in the title role of Charity Hope Valentine in Sweet Charity in Oklahoma City.

On television, Govich first gained national attention in the United States as Gabby in the pilot episode of CBS' Love Monkey, then as the prostitute/con-artist Candy on Rescue Me. She was in the lead cast of the Dick Wolf-produced series Conviction, a short-lived mid-season replacement in early 2006. Wolf immediately brought her back, in the 2006–2007 season, as Detective Nina Cassady in the main cast of his flagship series, Law & Order. She and her on screen partner, Jesse L. Martin as Det. Ed Green, were both replaced for the following season as part of the regular changes on the long-running series.

She has been featured or recurred on numerous other television shows: as New Orleans District Attorney Lyndsey Swann in the 20th Century Fox Television show K-Ville; as Assistant District Attorney Tracy Hunt on the CBS series The Defenders; and as Regina Turner on Make It or Break It.

She played a leading role on the MTV drama, Finding Carter.

Govich has also appeared in several films, including 2004's Bad Behavior, 2006's In Love, 2009's Sordid Things, 2011's A Novel Romance, starring opposite Steve Guttenberg, and Lucky Number, starring opposite Method Man.

== Directing ==
Govich was one of eight filmmakers selected for the American Film Institute's Directing Workshop for Women, mentored by Paul Feig. Her directorial debut short film, Temporary (which gained her acceptance into AFI) has won multiple awards on the film festival circuit.

Her short film, Unspeakable, written by David Cornue, served as an episodic proof of concept for a one-hour TV drama, also written by Cornue. As of May 2020, it remains unreleased.

Twelve years after leaving Law & Order, Govich reunited with Wolf as a director and co-executive producer for his CBS series FBI.

== Personal life ==
Govich is married to David Cornue, a writer, composer and film producer.

On October 10, 2008, Govich sang the U.S. national anthem at the New Jersey Devils home opener at the Prudential Center in Newark, New Jersey. She has also appeared twice on tour as a guest performer with Taiwanese pop star Fei Xiang.

== Filmography ==
=== Film ===
Year	Title	Role	Notes
2004	Bad Behavior	Alex	Short film
2006	In Love	Maxine	Short film
2006	East Side Story	Sara	Short film
2009	Sordid Things	Helen Little	
2011	A Novel Romance	Jenny Sparks	
2015	Lucky Number	Scar	
2015	Pass the Light	Anne	
2021	The Cleaner	Vanessa	

=== Television ===
Year	Title	Role	Notes
2005	Law & Order	Geneva	Episode: "Flaw"
2005–2009	Rescue Me	Candy	Recurring role
2006	Love Monkey	Gabby	Episode: "Pilot"
2006	Conviction	A.D.A. Jessica Rossi	Main cast
2006–2007	Law & Order	Det. Nina Cassady	Main cast
2007	K-Ville	D.A. Lyndsey Swann	Episodes: "Cobb's Webb", "Bedfellows" & "Melissa", "Boulet in a China Shop"
2009	Psych	Morgan Conrad	Episode: "Earth, Wind and... Wait for It"
2010	The Defenders	ADA Tracy Hunt	Episodes: "Nevada v. Cerrato", "Nevada v. Rodgers"
2011	Body of Proof	Mindy Harbinson	Episode: "Dead Man Walking"
2012	Make It or Break It	Regina Turner	Episodes: "Dream On" & "United States"
2014	The Mentalist	Molly	Episode: "Grey Water"
2014–2015	Finding Carter	Lori Stevens	Recurring role

=== Director ===
Year	Title	Notes
2018–2023	Chicago Med	8 episodes
2019	The InBetween	Episode: "Kiss Them for Me"
2019, 2021	Chicago Fire	2 episodes
2019–2026	FBI	9 episodes
2021	The Equalizer	Episode: "Shooter"
2021–2025	FBI: Most Wanted	9 episodes
2022	Good Sam	Episode: "The Griffith Technique"
2022–2025	Law & Order	6 episodes
2022–2025	FBI: International	4 episodes
2023–2024	Law & Order: Organized Crime	2 episodes
2026	Chicago P.D.	Episode: "Restored"
2026	CIA	2 episodes
