= FBI: International =

American television series (2021–2025)

- Genre: Crime drama; Police procedural; Action
- Created by: Dick Wolf & Derek Haas
- Starring: Luke Kleintank; Heida Reed; Carter Redwood; Vinessa Vidotto; Christiane Paul; Eva-Jane Willis; Christina Wolfe; Jesse Lee Soffer
- Composer: Atli Örvarsson
- Country of origin: United States
- Original language: English
- No. of seasons: 4
- No. of episodes: 78 (list of episodes)

Production
- Executive producers: Dick Wolf; Derek Haas; Matt Olmstead; Michael Katleman; Arthur W. Forney; Peter Jankowski
- Running time: 43 minutes
- Production companies: Wolf Entertainment; CBS Studios; Universal Television

Original release
- Network: CBS
- Release: September 21, 2021 – May 20, 2025

Related
- FBI; FBI: Most Wanted; CIA

FBI: International is an American police procedural television series that premiered on CBS on September 21, 2021. It is the second spin-off of Dick Wolf's drama FBI and the third series in the FBI franchise. The series follows a team of FBI special agents who investigate crime and terrorism abroad. A full season was ordered in October 2021.

In May 2022, CBS renewed the series for a second and third season. The second season premiered on September 20, 2022. The third season premiered on February 13, 2024, a delay from September 2023 due to the WGA and SAG-AFTRA strikes. For the same reason, there were just 13 episodes in the third season. In April 2024, the series was renewed for a fourth season, which premiered on October 15, 2024. In March 2025, the series was canceled after four seasons.

== Premise ==
The series follows members of the Federal Bureau of Investigation (FBI)'s international "Fly Team" (IFT), elite Special Agents headquartered in Budapest who locate and neutralize threats against American interests around the world principally in Europe.

The team is led by FBI Supervisory Special Agent Scott Forrester, a tough and grizzled FBI agent. Under his supervision are FBI Special Agents Jamie Kellett, a career FBI agent and second in command; Andre Raines, a young but highly intelligent agent with expertise in accounting; and Cameron Vo, an interrogation expert who is the newest team member, having formerly been a field agent in the Seattle FBI field office. Assisting the team is Katrin Jaeger, a veteran Europol Agent from Germany who helps the team navigate political and linguistic barriers. At the end of season 1, Jaeger is promoted to oversight of all Europol operations, and Megan "Smitty" Garretson, an old fling of Forrester, is assigned in her place.

At the start of season 3, in the aftermath of an explosion that destroys the Fly Team's headquarters, Special Agent Amanda Tate is assigned to the team as a tech analyst, while Kellett transfers back to the DC Field Office. Forrester later leaves the team and the Bureau after reuniting and going on the run with his fugitive mother. Special Agent Wesley "Wes" Mitchell gets assigned in his place.

In addition to facing a wide array criminal and terroristic threats, the Fly Team must also contend with the practical and legal challenges of operating in foreign jurisdictions, ranging from uneasy partnerships with foreign law enforcement to restrictions on using firearms. The show's international flavor is meant to juxtapose it with the vast majority of American police procedural shows, which take place almost exclusively in the United States.

== Cast ==
=== Main ===
- Luke Kleintank as Scott Forrester (seasons 1–3), an FBI Supervisory Special Agent and Head of the International Fly Team. Near the end of the third season, he leaves the team and the Bureau to reunite with his fugitive mother, with the two disappearing shortly afterwards.
- Heida Reed as Jamie Kellett (seasons 1–3), an FBI Special Agent who is the team's second in command. She later resigns from the team in the third season premiere, having fulfilled many things on her list, while also revealing she's returning to the United States and joining the Washington, D.C. field office.
- Carter Redwood as Andre Raines, an FBI Special Agent on the team, with a background in accounting.
- Vinessa Vidotto as Cameron Vo, an FBI Special Agent; she is a West Point graduate and is the team's newest member (until the addition of special agent Amanda Tate). In season 3, she is made second-in-command of the Fly Team following Kellett's departure.
- Christiane Paul as Katrin Jaeger (season 1; guest seasons 2 & 4), a multilingual Europol agent from Germany who acts as a liaison for the team, until her promotion to the head of Europol at the end of the first season.
- Eva-Jane Willis as Megan "Smitty" Garretson (seasons 2–4), a Europol agent and old acquaintance of Forrester assigned to replace Jaeger as the team's liaison.
- Christina Wolfe as Amanda Tate (seasons 3–4), an FBI Supervisory Intelligence Analyst brought on to lead the Fly Team's new analyst team.
- Green as Tank, a black Giant Schnauzer trained in Schutzhund and retired cadaver dog that obeys Scott Forrester's commands and is adopted by Andre Raines.
- Jesse Lee Soffer as Wesley "Wes" Mitchell (season 4), a former L.A.P.D. officer who is the new Supervisory Special Agent and Head of the International Fly Team following Forrester's departure.

=== Recurring ===
- Greg Hovanessian as FBI Special Agent Damian Powell (seasons 2–3)
- Sarah Junillon as FBI Intelligence Analyst Claire Armbruster (season 3)
- Stefan Trout as FBI Intelligence Analyst Ernesto Saunders (season 3–4)
- Eric James Gravolin as FBI Intelligence Analyst Kyle Cartwright (season 3–4)
- Colin Donnell as Brian Lange, an FBI Supervisory Special Agent and the FBI's liaison to the NSA (season 3)
- Jay Hayden as Agent Tyler Booth (season 4)
- Sydney Sainté as FBI Intelligence Analyst Celeste Lee (season 4)
- Veronica St. Clair as FBI Special Agent Riley Quinn (season 4)

=== Crossover characters ===
- Jeremy Sisto as Jubal Valentine, Assistant Special Agent in Charge in the FBI NYC field office (FBI)
- Zeeko Zaki as Omar Adom "OA" Zidan, an FBI Special Agent from New York (FBI)
- Alana de la Garza as Isobel Castile, Special Agent in Charge in the FBI NYC field office (FBI)
- Julian McMahon as Jesse LaCroix, an FBI Supervisory Special Agent of the Fugitive Task Force (FBI: Most Wanted)
- Missy Peregrym as Margaret "Maggie" Bell, an FBI Special Agent assigned to New York (FBI)
- R. Ward Duffy as FBI Deputy Director John Van Leer (FBI)
- John Boyd as Stuart Scola, an FBI Special Agent from New York (FBI)
- Shantel VanSanten as Nina Chase, an FBI Special Agent (FBI, FBI: Most Wanted)

== Production ==
=== Development ===
On January 12, 2020, it was reported that Dick Wolf was having conversations with CBS Entertainment President Kelly Kahl about launching a second FBI spinoff, following the success of the first spinoff, FBI: Most Wanted. Wolf claimed he always envisioned FBI as a franchise, as it offers an "endless trove of stories", while Kahl states "We are always talking to Dick [Wolf] and Dick is always bouncing ideas off of us and I can't rule anything out." It was also reported that development of the proposed spinoff would begin during the 2020–21 television season.

On February 18, 2021, it was announced that a second FBI spinoff titled FBI: International was being developed for the 2021–22 television season. Derek Haas was announced as the series showrunner and one of its executive producers, alongside Wolf, Peter Jankowski, and Arthur Forney. The new series is also likely, to begin with, a backdoor pilot. On March 24, 2021, CBS officially ordered the series, announcing it would debut in a crossover episode of FBI and FBI: Most Wanted, with Rick Eid also being added as an executive producer.

FBI: International premiered on September 21, 2021; a full season was ordered on October 11, 2021.

On May 9, 2022, CBS renewed the series for a second and third season. The second season premiered on September 20, 2022. The third season premiered on February 13, 2024. On April 9, 2024, CBS renewed the series for a fourth season which premiered on October 15, 2024. On March 4, 2025, CBS canceled the series after four seasons.

=== Broadcast ===
The show airs on Tuesday nights in Canada on Global.

Every episode of past seasons is available to stream on Peacock in the United States, while the current season is available to stream on Paramount+.

The show airs on Network 10 in Australia, Rai 2 in Italy, TV 2 in Norway, FOX in Portugal and AXN Asia.

FBI: International aired the first episode of season 1 on Sky Witness in the UK on July 22, 2022, at 9 pm with new episodes of FBI: International airing every Thursday at 10 pm, an hour after the main FBI series which airs in the UK on Thursday nights at 9 pm.

=== Casting ===
In July 2021, Luke Kleintank, Heida Reed, Vinessa Vidotto, Christiane Paul, and Carter Redwood were cast to star. On July 14, 2022, Paul exited the series with Eva-Jane Willis replacing her as a new character. On November 29, 2023, Christina Wolfe joined the cast as a new series regular for the series' third season. On December 7, 2023, it was announced that Heida Reed would leave the show some time during the third season. On April 23, 2024, it was announced that Luke Kleintank would leave the show during the third season. The next day, Colin Donnell joined the cast as a guest on third season. On June 20, 2024, Jesse Lee Soffer joined the cast as a new series regular for the series' fourth season.

== Episodes ==
Season	Episodes	Originally released		Rank	Rating
Season	Episodes	First released	Last released	Rank	Rating
1	21	September 21, 2021	May 24, 2022	16	8.23
2	22	September 20, 2022	May 23, 2023	15	7.74
3	13	February 13, 2024	May 21, 2024	18	7.09
4	22	October 15, 2024	May 20, 2025	TBA	TBA

== Reception ==
Viewership and ratings per season of FBI: International
Season	Timeslot (ET)	Episodes	First aired		Last aired		TV season
Season	Timeslot (ET)	Episodes	Date	Viewers (millions)	Date	Viewers (millions)	TV season
1	Tuesday 9:00 p.m.	21	September 21, 2021	6.43	May 24, 2022	5.32	2021–22
2	Tuesday 9:00 p.m.	22	September 20, 2022	5.44	May 23, 2023	5.36	2022–23
3	Tuesday 9:00 p.m.	13	February 13, 2024	5.97	May 21, 2024	4.52	2023–24
4	Tuesday 9:00 p.m.	22	October 15, 2024	4.99	May 20, 2025	4.80	2024–25

== See also ==
- Criminal Minds: Beyond Borders – Similar concept focusing on an FBI team that works internationally.
