= Michael Katleman =

American director and producer

- Occupations: Film director, film producer, television director, television producer
- Years active: 1985–present
- Parent: Harris Katleman (father)
- Website: http://mkatlemanreel.com/

Michael Katleman is an American film, television director and producer. He has worked on Smallville, Tru Calling, Gilmore Girls, Northern Exposure, Dark Angel, The Vampire Diaries, as well as many other programs. In 2007, Katleman directed the feature film Primeval.

== Partial filmography ==
- CIA (2026, director)
- FBI (2026, director)
- Cowboy Bebop (2021, director, executive producer)
- FBI: International (2021–2025, director)
- The Fix (2019, director)
- Reverie (2018, director)
- Primeval (2007, director, feature film)
- Point Pleasant (2005, executive producer)
- Tru Calling (2003–2005, director, executive producer)
- Birds of Prey (2002–2003, director, executive producer)
- Smallville (2002–2003, director)
- Gilmore Girls (2000–2001, director)
- China Beach (1988–1990, director, assistant director)
