= Lucky Spencer =

Fictional character from General Hospital

- General Hospital character
- Jonathan Jackson as Lucky Spencer
- Portrayed by: Jonathan Jackson (1993–1999, 2009–2025); Jacob Young (2000–2003); Greg Vaughan (2003–2009); Guy Wilson (2025)
- Duration: 1993–2011; 2015; 2024–2025
- First appearance: October 29, 1993
- Last appearance: June 11, 2025
- Created by: Claire Labine (Note: The announcement of Luke and Laura's child was shown in 1984, under executive producer Gloria Monty and head writer Anne Howard Bailey. The character was later developed and introduced in 1993 under executive producer Wendy Riche, during the transition between the writing team led by Claire Labine. Anthony Geary (Luke Spencer) and friend Irene Suver also helped to develop the introduction.)
- Introduced by: Wendy Riche (1993, 2000); Frank Valentini (2015, 2024)
- Book appearances: Robin's Diary; The Secret Life of Damian Spinelli
- Spin-off appearances: General Hospital: Twist of Fate (1996)
In-universe information
- Other names: Lucas Lorenzo Spencer Jr.; Ronan O'Reilly
- Occupation: Barman; Humanitarian; Police detective; Deception photographer
- Family: Spencer; Webber
- Parents: Luke Spencer; Laura Spencer
- Stepparents: Kevin Collins
- Sisters: Lulu Spencer
- Half-brothers: Nikolas Cassadine; Ethan Lovett
- Spouse: Elizabeth Webber (2005–2007) (Note: Elizabeth and Lucky divorce twice in 2007. First in January, remarrying in March, and divorcing again in October.); Siobhan McKenna (2011)
- Sons: Aiden Spencer
- Grandfathers: Tim Spencer; Gordon Grey; Rick Webber (adoptive)
- Grandmothers: Lena Eckert Spencer; Lesley Webber
- Uncles: Mike Webber (adoptive); Rick Webber Jr. (adoptive); Cyrus Renault; Martin Grey
- Aunts: Amy Vining; Bobbie Spencer; Pat Spencer
- Nephews: Spencer Cassadine; Rocco Falconeri; Ace Cassadine
- Nieces: Charlotte Cassadine; Phoebe Wilson
- First cousins: Carly Corinthos; B. J. Jones (adoptive); Lucas Jones (adoptive); Valerie Spencer

Lucky Spencer is a fictional character from the ABC Daytime soap opera General Hospital. He is the son of Luke (Anthony Geary) and Laura Spencer (Genie Francis). His birth having been announced on-screen in 1985, a ten-year-old Lucky was cast in 1993, played by then-newcomer Jonathan Jackson. Jackson left the series in 1999, and the character was played by Jacob Young and later Greg Vaughan, who was let go in 2009 to allow Jackson to reprise the role. Lucky's characterization changed throughout the different portrayers; originally a street-smart con artist, Lucky develops an edge during Young's tenure and more drastically changes during Vaughan's portrayal, as Lucky becomes a struggling police officer. With Jackson's reprisal, Lucky begins showing some of the character's original quick-witted qualities, but after a series of harrowing storylines, Jackson left the series in December 2011 and the role was not recast. Jackson briefly reprised the role in July 2015, and full-time in 2024. Guy Wilson appeared in several episodes as Lucky in February 2025 when Jackson was unavailable. Jackson exited again when Lucky left Port Charles in June 2025.

As a child, Lucky is known for taking part in the adventures of his parents. As a teenager, he becomes part of the supercouple Lucky Spencer and Elizabeth Webber (played by Rebecca Herbst) while Lucky helps Elizabeth recover after she has been raped. He learns of his parents' rape incident decades prior, exacerbating his rebellion and independence. Lucky is kidnapped and presumed dead in 1999, and returns brainwashed in 2000. He becomes a police officer in 2003, and faces financial and marital struggles during the following years, as well as prescription drug abuse. Lucky faces a series of tragic events starting in 2010, including Elizabeth's affair with his brother Nikolas Cassadine (Tyler Christopher), the death of his legal son Jacob Spencer, his father's alcoholism, the death of his wife Siobhan McKenna (Erin Chambers) and his own relapse into drug addiction.

Lucky's teenage story arcs had social impact; viewers praised the recovery of Elizabeth's rape as helping other victims to heal, and the couple's innocent relationship aimed to show the option of sexual abstinence to younger viewers. Jackson received numerous accolades for his portrayal of Lucky, including five Daytime Emmy Awards. Young also received a Daytime Emmy Award, while Vaughan was the only portrayer of Lucky to never receive an Emmy nomination.

== Casting ==
The faces of Lucky Spencer
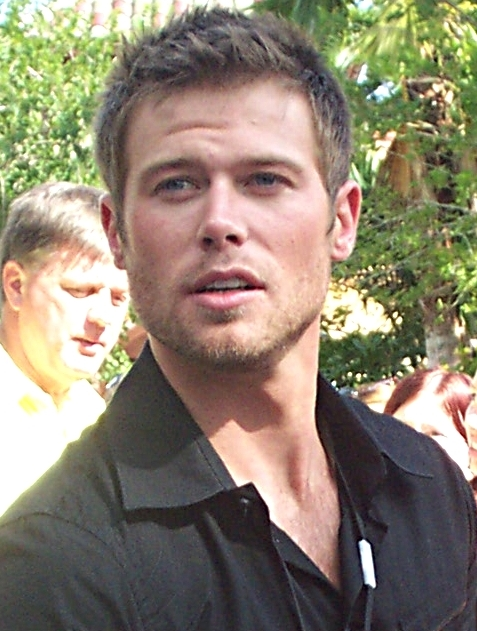
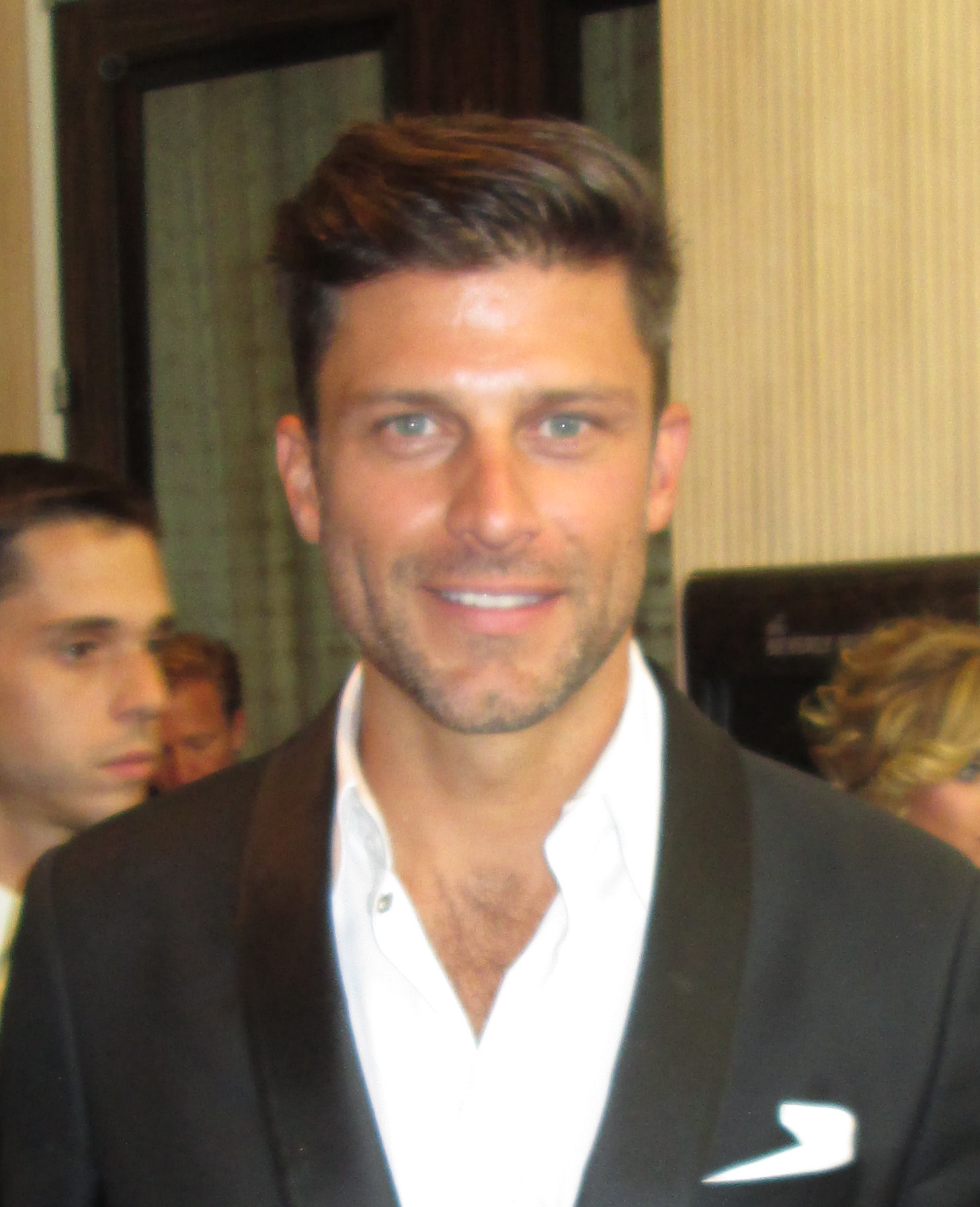
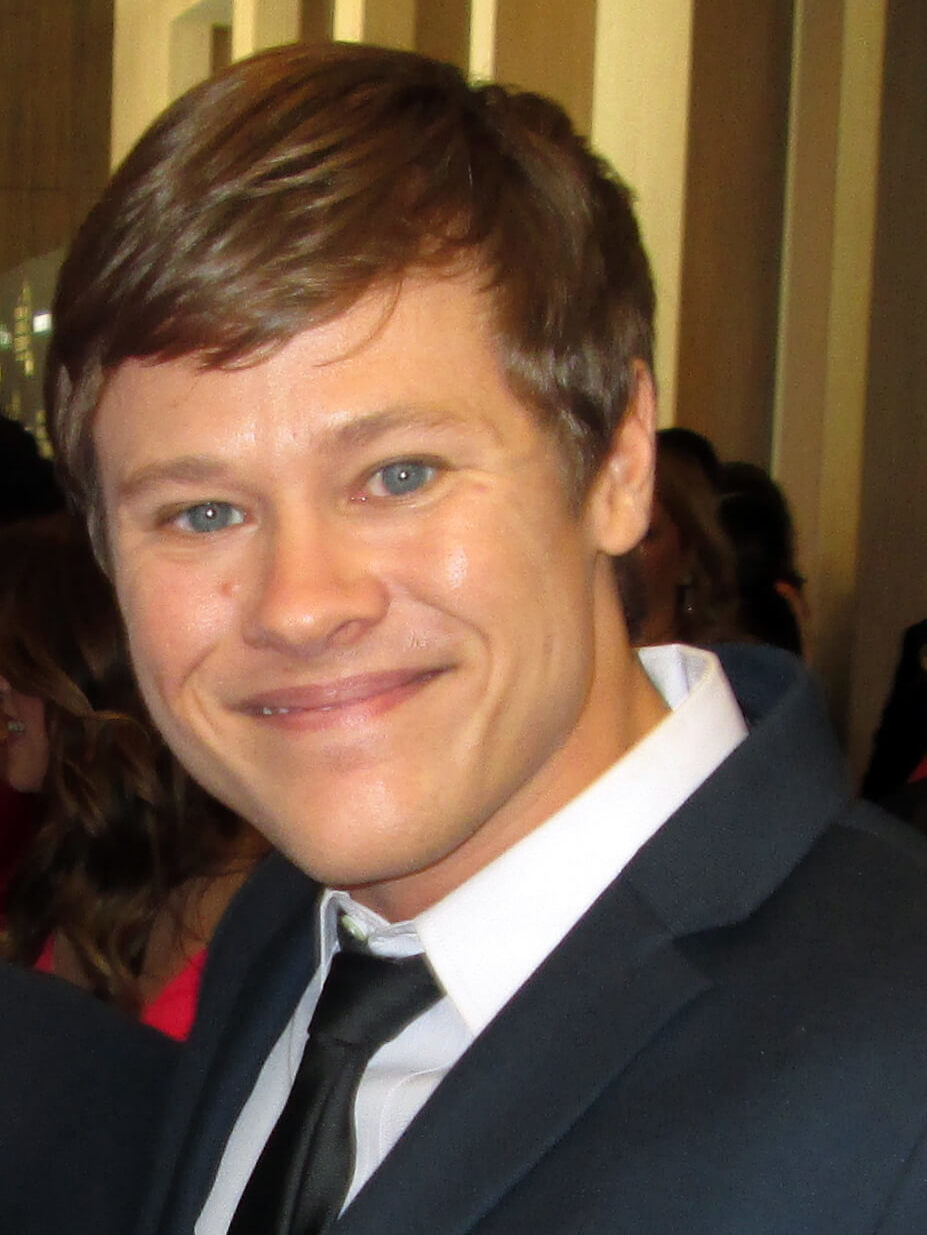
Actor Jacob Young (left) was cast as Lucky in 2000 and departed the role in 2003. Greg Vaughan (right) was cast as Young's successor and appeared in the role from 2003 to 2011. In 2025, Guy Wilson (right) temporarily portrayed the role for select episodes while Jackson was unavailable.

The role was originated on October 29, 1993, by eleven-year-old Jonathan Jackson. Rumors circulated that Jackson’s contract negotiations were not going well in 1996, and again in 1998, when Jackson responded that he was considering college and had given the series six months notice of his consideration in accordance with his contract. In January 1999, it was reported that the series had worked out a deal, and Jackson stated he had briefly extended his contract to allow the character's popular romance to continue. His contract allowed him to leave if he received a feature film role, and Jackson left in April, shooting pre-taped scenes that appeared on May 17, 1999. Jackson explained to Soap Opera Weekly: "I kind of feel that the fact of how much work they've given me this year, at this stage as an actor, they just maxed out quite a bit of what I would do for the show. And I'm at a better age now to go out. There are more projects for people my age or a little older than there were a few years ago. Hollywood's the kind of town where you kinda have to strike while the iron's hot." Jackson's manager Tony Monziotti released the statement: "[Jackson] has told GH and made it very clear to me that he wants to periodically go back to GH. It's a question of if the storyline warrants it and they want him to come back; Jonathan would be more than happy to." In early 2000, Jackson stated he would enjoy reprising the role but his schedule would not allow it. He suggested a short-term return that could coincide with the departure of co-star Rebecca Herbst (who plays Lucky's love interest Elizabeth Webber) should she not renew her contract, allowing for periodic returns from the couple later on. Although Herbst expressed interest, the show opted to keep the characters on canvas.

The role was recast with Jacob Young, who had left his role as Rick Forrester on The Bold and the Beautiful. Angela Shapiro, at the time President of ABC Daytime, stated: "It is challenging to cast a character as intense and compelling as Lucky Spencer. We are fortunate to find a young actor with Jacob's charisma and talent." Young assumed the role on February 25, 2000, almost a year after Jackson's last appearance, speculated to be an attempt to ease the transition between characters due to Jackson's popularity. Young commented: "At first I was a little bit insecure about (taking the role after Jackson). But now that I've started to think about it, Lucky was such a great character, and Jonathan did such a great job that (fans) wanted him to come back. (Lucky) being in such demand, I think it was great that it opened up and allowed someone else to come in and give this character a shot." In November 2000, Young guest starred on the FOX network sketch comedy series MADtv, making a small cameo appearance as the character. That December, Young announced he would not be renewing his contract, and last appeared on February 10, 2003. He cited a desire to pursue music and film work at the time, later admitting monetary contract disagreements as the reason he left.

Greg Vaughan, who had recently been let go from his role as Diego Guittierez on The Young and the Restless, was cast shortly thereafter and first appeared on February 20, 2003. Vaughan later described his screen test to Soap Opera Digest: "I was a little bit intimidated. I knew about the character, the foundation of the story. I knew it was a difficult task that I was about to take on." In July 2009, Vaughan denied rumors that he was being let go or put on recurring status. That September, ABC announced that Vaughan had decided to leave to explore other opportunities, and that Jackson would be reprising the role. However, Vaughan announced via Twitter that it was the network that decided to let him go. Jackson stated upon returning: "It was a tough situation. I was not under any sort of headspace that someone was losing their job; it was that the role was opening up. (...) It was more of a confusing thing for me coming back and not knowing exactly what was going on, on the other end of things." Vaughan last aired on October 20, 2009, while Jackson first aired on October 27, 2009.

In November 2011, it was announced that Jackson would vacate the role due to the large amount of work he was receiving. TV Guide reported that Jackson attempted to negotiate with the network for a lighter schedule and to be repaired with on-screen love interest Herbst (Elizabeth), but was denied on both accounts. Jackson explained: "I love to work hard but I've been at maximum capacity in terms of mental and emotional output for months on end and it has become too difficult. I am extremely thankful that they wanted to give me all those storylines with so much depth, but there's just no balance. (...) I have a wife and three kids and other things in life I have to think about. I just knew I couldn't sustain the schedule at GH and that kind of emotion for much longer. It was just too intense." Jackson confirmed the character would not die or be recast, and last appeared on December 23, 2011. In June 2015, Entertainment Weekly revealed that Jackson would briefly reprise the role of Lucky, to be a part of the exit storyline of actor Anthony Geary.

On June 11, 2024, at the 51st Daytime Emmy Awards, executive producer Frank Valentini teased the return of a "former cast member is coming back. And I think that the audience will go crazy for HIM" to KABC-TV. Eighteen days later, Deadline Hollywood announced Jackson would reprise the role of Lucky for a "long run." Jackson returned to set on August 5, 2024, with Lucky returning during the August 23 episode as a series regular. In February 2025, Guy Wilson briefly played in the role while Jackson was unavailable. Four months later, it was announced Jackson would again exit the role, nine months after returning. Addressing his exit with TV Insider, Jackson cited the travel from Tennessee to California as "too disruptive" for him and his family. He exited the role on June 11.

== Storylines ==
Lucky Spencer first appears in October 1993, as a ten-year-old that has spent his life on the run from mobster Frank Smith (Mitchell Ryan) with his parents, Luke and Laura Spencer (Anthony Geary and Genie Francis). Smith finds them living in British Columbia, Canada, and Lucky is sent ahead to Port Charles for safety. Lucky is shot and almost paralyzed while following Luke. In August 1994, his sister Lesley Lu "Lulu" Spencer is born, and in 1995, he becomes good friends with Emily Quartermaine (then Amber Tamblyn) and they briefly run away. Lucky struggles with a gambling problem in early 1996 and accumulates a large debt playing poker. Lulu is diagnosed with aplastic anemia, and Lucky is shocked to learn about his half-brother Nikolas Cassadine (then Tyler Christopher), who arrives to donate bone marrow and becomes instant rivals with Lucky. Lucky helps Luke investigate Stefan Cassadine's (Stephen Nichols) computer game Timoria, and they find his presumed dead grandmother Lesley Webber (Denise Alexander). On Valentine's Day 1998, Lucky finds Elizabeth Webber (Rebecca Herbst) after she has been raped and takes care of her. He finds out from Nikolas that Luke raped Laura years ago, and moves out. He lives in a boxcar and eventually in a room above Jason Morgan (Steve Burton)'s bike shop in exchange for work. Lucky and Elizabeth help Nikolas and Emily catch Emily's blackmailer, found to be Elizabeth's rapist, and in the process Lucky and Nikolas start to bond. Meanwhile, Lucky and Elizabeth fall in love; they exchange vows in a church on Valentine's Day in 1999. In April, Lucky is presumed dead in a fire, but it is revealed he is being held captive by Cesar Faison (Anders Hove), hired by Helena Cassadine (Constance Towers).

In early 2000, Helena lets Lucky (now Young) go and it becomes clear he has been brainwashed. Helena uses the Ice Princess diamond to make Lucky act violently and erases Lucky's memories of love for Elizabeth. Elizabeth fakes her death to help Nikolas (then Stephen Martines, credited as Coltin Scott) gain Helena's trust, and Lucky's visions of her and their love help him break Helena's control. They reunite, but he is unable to regain his feelings and in December 2001, Elizabeth stops their wedding when she realizes the truth. They struggle to start over, and Elizabeth breaks up with Lucky after she finds him kissing her sister Sarah Webber (then Sarah Laine). In August 2002, Lucky and Nikolas try to cover up the death of Laura's stepfather Rick Webber (Chris Robinson) when they think Luke killed him. When Laura is told she killed Rick, she has a mental breakdown and has to be committed. Luke acts self-destructively and Nikolas takes control of Laura's treatment, causing tension between Luke and Lucky (now Vaughan). When Lucky's girlfriend Summer Halloway (Brittney Powell) is pushed off a cliff, he joins the police academy to help find evidence. Luke is unhappy that Lucky has become a cop, causing various rifts between them. In February 2004, Lucky almost dies during a fire at the Port Charles Hotel. When Nikolas (reprised by Christopher) is presumed dead in April, Lucky comforts Emily (now Natalia Livingston) and develops romantic feelings she does not return. Lucky is suspended for helping Nikolas when he presumably kills Helena. Lucky finds Helena, who shoots him, putting him into a coma. Luke unplugs his ventilator, causing him to breathe on his own. Meanwhile, Lucky and Elizabeth reconnect. Their financial struggles prompt Elizabeth to become a surrogate mother for Courtney (Alicia Leigh Willis) and Jasper Jacks (Ingo Rademacher), upsetting Lucky, but Elizabeth miscarries in September 2005. They marry in October, and Lucky takes on raising Liz's son Cameron as his own. Lucky almost dies in a train crash on the way to their honeymoon, and again during an encephalitis outbreak in February 2006. In April, he has a serious back injury while trying to save Elizabeth from Manny Ruiz (Robert LaSardo). Overcome by his injury, financial trouble and guilt over the death of his partner Jesse Beaudry (Matt Marraccini), Lucky becomes addicted to painkillers and has an affair with Maxie Jones (Kirsten Storms). Elizabeth walks in on them, and sleeps with Jason Morgan, becoming pregnant. She lets Lucky believe he is the father to avoid him relapsing. Maxie fakes a pregnancy in an unsuccessful attempt to keep Lucky. Elizabeth divorces Lucky, but they remarry after he completes rehab. In May 2007, Elizabeth gives birth to Jacob Spencer. Her relationship with Jason makes Lucky jealous, and their marriage struggles. Lucky starts dating Jason's ex-girlfriend Sam McCall (Kelly Monaco) as they divorce. In November 2007, Lucky discovers the truth about Jake, but agrees to the secret to protect him from Jason's dangerous lifestyle. Lucky and Sam break up.

In early 2009, Elizabeth is poisoned by a biotoxin and Lucky stays by her bedside. He is upset to learn in June that Ethan Lovett (Nathan Parsons) is his half brother. When Lucky dates Rebecca Shaw (Natalia Livingston), Nikolas kisses Elizabeth to make them jealous, prompting Lucky and Elizabeth to get back together. Elizabeth is attracted to Nikolas, and sleeps with him the night she accepts Lucky's proposal. Meanwhile, Lucky (reprised by Jackson) works with Dante Falconeri (Dominic Zamprogna) to investigate Franco (James Franco). In early 2010, Lucky finds Nikolas and Elizabeth having sex and eventually berates them. They learn she is pregnant, and Helena Cassadine changes the DNA test to show Nikolas as the father. In July, Elizabeth gives birth to Aiden, who is kidnapped by Franco until Lucky finds him. Lucky is approached by Interpol to pose as Irish hitman Ronan O'Reilly and identify "The Balkan" (Daniel Benzali). Lucky brings Siobhan McKenna (Erin Chambers) home for safety, and asks her to marry him so she can get a green card. In March 2011, Elizabeth finds out Lucky is Aiden's father, but keeps it a secret after Jake is killed in a hit-and-run accident. Lucky helps convince Elizabeth to donate Jake's kidney to Josslyn Jacks. He finds out Luke hit Jake and accuses him of drunk driving, staging an unsuccessful intervention. Lucky burns down the old Spencer house, accidentally injuring Siobhan. To stop him from drinking, Elizabeth tells Lucky that Aiden is his son. Nikolas briefly plans to take Aiden out of the country before returning him and leaving town. Lucky volunteers for an undercover drug case during which Anthony Zacchara (Bruce Weitz) has him injected with drugs. Elizabeth finds Lucky but gets in a car accident that puts Siobhan in the hospital on her way to get him medication. Anthony kills Siobhan and Lucky uses pills when he finds her dead. He struggles to overcome his addiction. Elizabeth tries to reconcile but Lucky goes to Ireland. He receives a mysterious message that Aiden is hurt just in time to get him to the hospital. Elizabeth fakes a breakdown to get Lucky's attention, and when Lucky finds out the truth he goes back to Ireland. He recognizes someone, later revealed to be his mother Laura. In 2013, Ethan reveals that Lucky is in Africa, doing volunteer work.

Lucky made a brief return in 2015 as part of Luke Spencer's exit.

== Character development ==
=== Introduction ===
Lucky is introduced to the canvas within the much anticipated return of his parents, famed General Hospital adventurers and popular supercouple of the 1970–80s, Luke and Laura Spencer. Luke and Laura had been last seen in Texas in December 1984, when Laura announces her pregnancy, and reveal off-screen in August 1985 that they had a son. The series SORAS-aged the child when he is introduced as a ten-year-old in 1993, played by Jackson. Anthony Geary (Luke) and writer Irene Suver helped to create the storyline of the family's return, and the network fired most of the General Hospital writing team in August 1993 to bring on new head writer, Emmy Award winner Claire Labine. The original introduction story for Lucky was planned to have the child in need of a bone marrow transplant, a story later used on Lucky's younger sister Lulu. Instead, the story included high-budget action sequences reminiscent of the couple's previous adventures, including explosions, car chases and parachutes. Lucky had spent his life on the run with his parents, and is independent, street-smart and quick-witted. The character is shown to be a product of his parents, exhibiting qualities of both. Jackson later explained to Entertainment Weekly in 2009:

I think that Lucky's always been a paradox and a contradiction a little bit because he had the edge and the wildness and the rebellion of Luke but he also had the purity and the innocence of Laura.

"He's a total peer, and when we work, he's utterly my son. He has absorbed Genie [Laura] and me. If you watch him, he's got a lot of her emotional turns, and he's picked up my rhythm. He moves like me. I've seen him in other things, and he doesn't do that. This is a choice he's made as Lucky."

— Geary (Luke) in 1996, on Jackson’s portrayal.

Lucky's rich life experience for his young age makes him wise beyond his years. He plays cons with his parents and is always able to make a quick get away; in his introduction storyline, he travels from Canada to Port Charles on his own when his parents have to send him ahead for safety. He later is able to stay one step ahead of his parents when he and his friend Emily Quartermaine (then Tamblyn) briefly run away. He has a loving relationship with his unconventional parents, who often treat him as a friend and peer, especially his father. Luke in turn looks to see himself in Lucky, and the two have a very close bond. In 1995, Jackson described to the Los Angeles Times: "Lucky lives every boy's dream. He has loving parents, a baby sister, a loyal dog, and even a little bit of danger in his life. But with parents like Luke and Laura, he can't help but get in on the action."

=== Rebellion ===
“The intent is to drive a big wedge between Lucky and the father he idolizes, which is going to be brutal and painful for both of them. It's really hard to believe the writers are doing it, because this is a very scary can of worms that could eat us all."

— Geary in 1998, on Luke and Lucky's relationship after the reveal of the rape.

In 1998, the series chose to revisit the Luke and Laura rape storyline of the 1970s by having the incident revealed to Lucky. The controversial story of Luke raping Laura had quickly been renounced to a seduction at the time, after facing pressure from fans of the newly popular couple. In 1998, Pat Fili-Krushel, then President of Daytime Programming for ABC Daytime, explained to The New York Times: "What we felt we should investigate is how, as the famous saying goes, the sins of the father are visited on the children." Head writer at the time Robert Guza, Jr. commented to the Associated Press: "We are going to say, certainly, that the son is dealing with rape in a much better way, a much more appropriate way, and a much healthier way, than the father did."

In the story, Lucky comes across Elizabeth Webber (Herbst) after she has been raped, and confides his upset to his father before his hostile half-brother Nikolas Cassadine (then Christopher) reveals to him that Luke had raped Laura years prior. The betrayal Lucky feels from having the truth kept from him has a drastic impact on the character, especially because of how close he had been with his parents. Having moved around often, their relationship had become more like best friends than parent-child. Lucky struggles to understand his parents' actions. Jackson described Lucky in 1999 as: "a black-and-white personality. He either loves or hates people. He doesn't know about balance." Lucky's relationship with each of his parents suffers; he thinks his mother is in denial about her attack, and is even more angry with his father for keeping the secret while Lucky was coping with Elizabeth's assault. Lucky moves out and his independence grows further as he crashes at various places around Port Charles while holding odd jobs and continuing his schoolwork. As a result of the ordeal, honesty becomes important to Lucky; Jackson explained to Soap Opera Digest in December 1998: "He doesn't want to do what his parents did as far as keeping secrets from each other and lying. He's pretty set on doing things differently when it comes to the decisions he makes in his life."

"I think his passion for the people and things he loves was something that I related to. He felt everything so deeply, and the reactions I gave as an actor came from me trying to wrap my own brain around everything that happened to him."

— Jackson in 1999, reflecting on Lucky's character.

Lucky and Luke start a slow process of reconciling when Luke kidnaps Lucky to an abandoned cabin and Lucky watches Luke distressfully dream of the rape while suffering from a delirious fever following a wolf trap accident. Lucky's relationship with his mother becomes further strained in December 1998 when he and Nikolas are told that Stefan Cassadine (Nichols) is Nikolas's father, not the presumed-dead Stavros Cassadine, and Laura had kept the secret. Lucky and Nikolas begin to bond over the betrayal of their respective families. Lucky's estrangement with his parents adds to his newfound open-mindedness about Nikolas, as Jackson told Soap Opera Magazine: "Lucky's been trying to change the way he looks at things, to not become Luke. That's part of the process – not having the same relationship with Nikolas that Luke has with Stefan. (...) He's trying to find his own Spencer." The former enemies become friends, a sign of Lucky's growth of character. Actress Genie Francis (Laura) explained to Soap Opera Digest in April 1999: "It's huge, absolutely huge. (It's) something that really seemed impossible, but Lucky surprises [Laura] with his big heart and his maturity." In the same interview, Guza described the acceptance Lucky had come to have about his parents, recounting scenes where Lucky bonds with each. Guza explained: "They still have a ways to go, but the important thing is they're making the inroads now. (...) I wouldn't say it's the final resolution between them, but they're well on their way toward it."

=== Relationship with Elizabeth Webber ===
In 1998, Lucky enters into a relationship with Elizabeth Webber (Herbst) that affects his character throughout the years. Jackson explained to Soap Opera Digest that prior to being paired with Elizabeth, the series had been hesitant to do a romantic storyline with his young character. He stated: "It's a real tricky thing, especially with me growing up on the show. I mean, I was 11 when I started, so there's a lot of people watching who almost feel like parents. They're sensitive about who I get interested in. I think it's really cool to see everyone respond so positively toward [Herbst] and toward the characters being together." Lucky and Elizabeth first bond when Lucky finds Elizabeth after she has been raped. He protectively cares for her, and as their on-screen relationship gradually progresses to friendship and innocent romance, the characters' off-screen popularity made them known as a supercouple. Dealing with Elizabeth's rape becomes more complicated for Lucky when he learns of the rape between his parents; he fears that he could have inherited violent sexual behaviors from his father, and could hurt Elizabeth. Elizabeth helps him deal with his fears, as well as his fallout with his parents.

“From the very minute Elizabeth's rape happened, his relationship with Elizabeth has been unique. I think something outside of him threw him into this connection with her. It almost wasn't a choice. It wasn't something he thought about intellectually, it just happened.”

— Jackson in 1998, on Lucky and Elizabeth.

Jackson explained that Lucky and Elizabeth's mutual unfortunate life circumstances were a major factor in their growing relationship, stating: "They automatically had a chance to prove to each other that they were going to be there through some of the worst stuff. And they passed." Jackson also felt that the couple's relationship was crucial to Lucky's growth and acceptance of his parents, stating to Soaps In Depth in 1999: "I think it was through that relationship and that love that Lucky obtained a sense of peace that made him want to mend things with his parents more. I don't think he would have done it otherwise." When Jackson left the series in April 1999, Lucky and Elizabeth's teenage romance ends as Lucky is presumed dead in a fire. The couple attempts reconciliation from 2000 to 2002 during Jacob Young's tenure, and reunites in 2005 while Greg Vaughan played the role. Lucky and Elizabeth have an on-and-off relationship throughout the years that includes marriages, infidelity and children. Herbst explained portraying the relationship through different actors to Comcast in 2010: "The characters are still the same. Each individual actor chose to play him a little differently. You just roll with it. Each relationship was different. They all had their uniqueness."

=== Edge ===
After Jackson left the series in April 1999, the character was kept off-screen for almost a year before Young took over the role upon Lucky’s return in February 2000. Young commented on his new character: "I like Lucky's mystique. He's just very cool, relaxed. He never oversteps his boundaries. I’m planning to give my own perspective to this." The series explained the character's absence and staged death as a kidnapping by Cesar Faison (Hove) and Helena Cassadine (Towers). It is soon apparent upon his return that Lucky has been brainwashed; Guza explained the change in character that would be seen in Lucky's reunion with his parents: "The kid doesn't at all react the way we expected. This time he's been away he's obviously changed a great deal, into a different person emotionally. His whole relationship to his parents is confusing. It's a different Lucky, in many ways." The mind control continues after Lucky is released; Helena makes him act erratically and violently, hurting his father and forgetting his memories of love for Elizabeth. The ordeal leaves an impression on Lucky after it is over; the writers used the opportunity to develop an edge to the character. The series promoted Lucky as a "rebel" in its teen-focused summer advertising campaign in 2000. Young filmed commercials where he stated in character: "Rules? I don't play that game." Young explained the change in character to entertainment journalist Candace Havens in 2000:

He definitely has more of an edge now than he did before. Part of that is because of what has happened to him, and some of it is just the way I am as an actor. He's kind of lost and isn't sure where he belongs.

Lucky maintains his edgier nature as his relationship with Elizabeth falls apart as a result of Helena's damage, and later on as he deals with his mother's mental breakdown and catatonia. TVSource Magazine reflected in 2009 on Lucky's character during Young's tenure: "The brainwashing eventually wore off, but the character never really gelled with the brave, strong, compassionate and loyal son of Luke Spencer that Jackson had created."

=== Adulthood ===
Vaughan assumed the role in 2003. He was a visually older actor than Young and Jackson, and Lucky's storylines grew to become more adult as well. In 2009, Vaughan reflected that fans “embraced me more as Lucky being the man, instead of the child.” The year Vaughan started, Lucky starts a career in law enforcement when he joins the police academy in order to become involved in the murder investigation of his girlfriend Summer Halloway (Powell). This was a confusing character change for viewers, as Lucky had grown up emulating his parents and their cons, sharing in his father's distaste for law enforcement. Becoming a cop puts Lucky and his father Luke on opposite sides of the law, a contributing factor to the tension seen between them in forthcoming years. Other adult issues Lucky faces include financial struggles and marriage. In 2005, Lucky is repaired with Elizabeth and becomes the stepfather to her son Cameron. Vaughan told Soap Opera Digest in 2005:

I identify more with the older version of Lucky than the youthful version. They're more set in their ways now. But that's pretty much the only way I know [Lucky and Elizabeth] since they've been reunited, taking him on as somebody who has an occupation, going through the financial struggles of an adult, taking care of a child and significant other that he wants to spend the rest of his life with.

“Today, Lucky is a police officer with a major ax to grind against his father – he's no longer the little ‘cowboy' Jackson played originally.”

— Entertainment Weekly in 2009, on the change in Lucky’s character during Vaughan's tenure.

During Vaughan's tenure, Lucky also made a drastic character change away from his previously known quick thinking and street smarts, seen both in his police work and personal life. By 2009, Abby West of Entertainment Weekly wrote that Lucky was "a character who's been written as earnest (he's Johnny Law to his father's rebel) if not the brightest bulb", while Leslie Gray Streeter of The Palm Beach Post called him "everybody's favorite cute punching bag." The character's misfortune escalates in 2006, when Lucky becomes addicted to painkillers following the stress of a back injury, his medical bills and his guilt over the death of his partner. Adding to his stress, his pride is often hurt when Elizabeth is saved from peril by Jason Morgan (Burton) rather than him, adding stress to their marriage. His addiction leads to an affair with Maxie Jones (Storms), who supplies him pills and fakes a pregnancy in an attempt to make him stay with her. Elizabeth finds out about the affair and sleeps with Jason, becoming pregnant and telling Lucky he is the father. The series of unfortunate storylines led Steeler to state that the writers "made [Lucky] a dull stooge whose woman would rather be with anyone else but him", while TVSource Magazine called Lucky "Port Charles' bumbling police detective who just can't catch a break".

Lucky's relationship with Elizabeth falls apart due to their financial problems, Lucky’s addiction, their infidelity, and Lucky's discovery in 2007 that Elizabeth's son Jake is Jason's son. Meanwhile, Lucky's misfortune continues as his best friend Emily Quartermaine (then Livingston) is murdered the same night his father has a heart attack. Vaughan described Lucky's state of mind to the New York Daily News in 2007: “Words cannot define the rage and the fury. This beautiful thing, that has completely altered his life and given it new meaning, is a lie. (...) He's bitter. He's also in a very weak place, emotionally and physically.” Accompanying the fallout of Lucky and Elizabeth's marriage, Jason's jealous ex-girlfriend Sam McCall (Monaco) manipulates Lucky into a relationship with her as revenge on Elizabeth, although her feelings eventually turn genuine. Monaco described the pairing to Soap Opera Digest in 2008: "Sam and Lucky's romance was nice. It was sweet. It was friendly. It was innocent. I mean, gosh, Sam did do a lot of manipulating and crap (to land Lucky), but he was teaching her a lot."

During Vaughan's tenure, Lucky becomes more of a backburner character with minimal story arcs that center around him. During budget cuts in 2009, Vaughan addressed rumors by stating, “I haven't been put on recurring status – but it feels like it!”

=== Jackson's return ===
"When it comes to Lucky, it's very visceral for me and very instinctive. So much of the character was what he was – the offspring of Luke and Laura. (...) When you play a character day in and day out for years like I did, it's like a second skin almost. It's very close to you. So walking back in, I just brought who I am now as an adult into it. And it just felt really smooth and comfortable."

— Jackson in 2009, on reprising the role.

Jackson returned to the role in October 2009, and viewers wondered if Lucky would regain original character traits that had changed over the years and different actors. Jackson stated that he had not seen the other actors' portrayal of Lucky and was basing his reprisal on his experience of creating the role. He told Entertainment Weekly:

I'm coming with the strength of originating the character and working with Tony [Geary] and Genie [Francis] at a young age in sort of defining who Lucky was and is. I guess I'm more focused on the connection I do have with the character than the transitions that people might have to undergo to see me as the character.

Jackson said that he was not concerned or focused on the events in Lucky's life while he was gone, stating: “You can't act information and you can't act history (...) That's what happened and that's what he's gone through, and that's that.” Jackson felt the heart and soul of the character were still the same; the foundation of Lucky was still the product of Luke and Laura. He described his portrayal as working through the contradictory traits Lucky inherited from his parents, the purity of Laura versus the con artist side of Luke. He explained that he was taking the essence of being their son and translating him into adulthood.

“There's no fighting it – Jackson brings an entirely different dynamic to the role.”

— Entertainment Weekly on Jackson's 2009 return.

When asked about the now strained relationship between Lucky and Luke, Jackson stated: “Tony [Geary] and I have had some great scenes that feel like re-establishing something. Again, I did not watch the other versions of Lucky, but for me it's picking up where I left off ten years ago, but now as an adult. There is a lot of interesting chemistry going on there.” The history between Jackson and Geary helped the on-screen relationship become more dynamic. Jackson's return also saw the relationship between Lucky and Jason change. Although Lucky does not abandon the police force, the previously black-and-white cop works hand-in-hand with the mob enforcer in attempts to take down both "The Balkan" (Benzali) and Franco (James Franco). Lucky becomes stuck between the two sides of the law. Jackson explained to The Huffington Post in 2009: "I think my instincts towards him being a detective (include) ambiguity. Growing up as Luke's son, and given Luke's ties to the mob, Lucky's seen the world from both sides. I don't think that Lucky sees it as black and white. There are shades of gray." In 2010, when asked if Lucky would become more “Luke-like” now that he was back in the role, Jackson replied: “I am hoping that is where they go with it. Lucky has been doing a lot of that straight cop stuff. I think if we can show the wild side of him that resembles Luke that will be nice.” He commented in a 2011 interview with Entertainment Weekly that he would like Lucky and Luke to work a con again, stating: "Lucky feels the most free and like himself when he's doing stuff like that. They've had Luke and Lucky pitted against each other for a while, so it'd be nice to pair them up."

=== Tragedy ===
"Jackson's performance resonated with hurt, [betrayal], and that everything and everyone he believed in shattered in just that one sickening moment."

— Michael Fairman, on Lucky learning of the affair.

When Jackson returned to the role, he was given multiple emotional storylines that continually put Lucky in tragic situations. As Jackson resumed the character in October 2009, Lucky is unaware that Elizabeth, his fiancée again, is having an affair with his brother Nikolas. What started as a joke grows into a physical relationship the same night Elizabeth accepts Lucky's remarriage proposal. Herbst explained to Comcast: "I truly believe that [Elizabeth] is in love with Lucky and has been in love with him her entire life. But what happened with Nikolas caught her by surprise as much as everybody else. It's hard for her to articulate it. She just knows that Nikolas did make her feel more like a woman and that in her relationship with Lucky she's very much still that 16-year-old girl that constantly needs to be saved. That's kind of the role that Lucky has played in her life." When Lucky eventually walks in on her with Nikolas, he does not say anything and instead trashes his house and resumes drinking. J Bernard Jones from entertainment website Zap2it described that Lucky: "generally was an emotional wreck, careening all over the place like a pinball. On the other hand, whenever Lucky was with Elizabeth or Nikolas he was cold and detached, imbuing just enough of Jackson's trademark sincerity (some would say over-earnestness) to knock the two cheatin' hearts off-kilter." Lucky is irate by the time he confronts them. Herbst described the scene: "Jonathan actually seemed like one more step and he was going to take my head off. Honestly, it was not so hard to be present when he was yelling at me like he did." Jones from Zap2it stated that in the confrontation scenes: "Jackson accomplished a much harder task than simply reclaiming the Lucky mantle: he has bridged the gap between his previous run, Jacob Young's and most recently, Greg Vaughan's. Now Lucky seems like a whole person once again, as opposed to a fractured character sliced up over the years by the writers, and fractured by fan loyalties." Lucky, Nikolas and Elizabeth soon learn that Elizabeth is pregnant, and either brother could be the father. Jackson explained Lucky's position:

This is potentially the third child that she's had with someone else besides him so I think it's extraordinarily painful and sort of over-the-top emotionally. That little percentage of possibility that it could be his scares the crap out of him because if it was his he would have to deal with reconciliation and forgiveness, not even being with her necessarily, just even having to heal some of the wounds. Either way, it's a horrible situation.

In a separate interview, Jackson stated that while on the surface Lucky may not want the child to be his, deep down he thinks a part of the character does. Elizabeth hopes Lucky is the father, thinking it is the only way she can salvage their relationship, and has a difficult time coming to terms with Lucky not wanting her anymore. After Lucky finds her suffering from hypothermia in the church where they said their vows as teenagers, and later has to talk her down off the roof of the hospital, she is sent to Shadybrook sanitarium. This prompts Lucky to be gentler about his anger, and to stop drinking before suffering a serious relapse. Jackson explained: "The crisis that's going on with Elizabeth, the fact that Cam and Jake don't have a mother right now, I think that sort of wakes Lucky up to say, 'I need to get my stuff together because I need to be present for those kids.'" Elizabeth gives birth to Aiden, and they believe Nikolas to be the father due to Helena tampering with the DNA test. Aiden is kidnapped by Franco, forcing Lucky to work together with Nikolas, which starts to repair their relationship. Still feeling lost, Lucky accepts an undercover assignment to pose as an Irish hitman named Ronan O'Reilly, coincidentally his doppelgänger. Lucky works to take down "The Balkan", and meets Siobhan McKenna (Chambers), who initially puts an end to his romantic bad luck streak. They face trouble when Siobhan is blackmailed by The Balkan and hides it from Lucky, who is sensitive to betrayal after Elizabeth's affair. They eventually plan a green card marriage so that she can stay in the country with him. During their first ceremony, Lucky learns his son Jake has been in a hit-and-run accident, that eventually renders him braindead. Jake's death sets another string of tragic events in motion. Lucky finds out his father was the driver, and accuses Luke of driving drunk. Lucky is adamant that his father is an alcoholic, but Luke refutes that Lucky wants to blame the alcohol so that he does not have to blame him. Lucky eventually stages an intervention, which only angers Luke. Lucky tracks Luke down to the brothel where Luke grew up, but when Luke tells Lucky that it liberated him to kill Jake, Lucky leaves. Distraught, he burns down his childhood home, accidentally injuring Siobhan. Elizabeth finds Lucky and tells him that he is Aiden's father, stopping Lucky from drinking. In May 2011, Jackson spoke of the unending turmoil in Lucky's life:

Honestly, it has been insane the amount of intense work I have had over the past year on GH. I have literally been on my knees praying to continually get through it. There was the Elizabeth tragedy that happened last year, and then Lucky was drunk, and then he was at the edge of everything for four months. Then, this year it has been Jake's death, and the Luke's intervention and one thing after another.

Lucky's life did not subside; he volunteers for an undercover drug case, and is injected with drugs under the orders of Anthony Zacchara (Weitz). He spends a night hallucinating, and although Elizabeth finds him and eventually gets him medication, she meanwhile gets in a car accident that puts Lucky's wife Siobhan in the hospital. Anthony murders Siobhan, and her death is the last straw for Lucky, who willingly takes pills. Lucky struggles but stops his drug use. He denies Elizabeth's attempts to reconcile and leaves town in December 2011.

Jackson stated leaving his children during Christmas was one piece of unfinished business Lucky had, as well as not having gone on any adventures with his family. Anthony Geary agreed, telling Soaps In Depth: "That was a major production mistake, and a terrible waste. The whole family was primed for a great adventure together. The audience would have loved it, and it would have been completely consistent with our family history. Sometimes they miss the most obvious story ideas. It's frustrating." Geary added that father and son were left in a bitter place when Lucky abruptly left town, lacking any resolution after Jake's death and the intervention. When asked in 2012 to describe Lucky after his departure, Jackson explained to CT Post: "He has a dark side, but he's a really good soul. He's more tortured than villainous. He's had drug abuse, lost a child, been through a lot."

== Reception ==
In 2023, Charlie Mason from Soaps She Knows placed Lucky at #16 on his ranked list of General Hospital’s 40+ Greatest Characters of All Time, commenting that "A do-right guy in a do-wrong town, Luke’s halo-clad son was destined to suffer — and man, did he, through his own “death,” drug addiction, adultery and, in the end, the demolition of his relationship with true love Elizabeth Webber… at least for now."

=== Introduction ===
“It didn't take much time for him to become an audience favorite. Jackson's artless, all-boy portrayal is a breath of fresh air."

— Soap Opera Digest on Jackson's portrayal in 1994.

The introduction of Lucky, paired with Luke and Laura's reintroduction, was met with some cynicism; Georgia Dullea of the Milwaukee Journal Sentinel did not approve of the show's decision to let go of other popular characters in order to introduce the family. Dullea also accused the series of using Lucky, an attractive child character, as an effort to get fans to care for Luke and Laura as much as they did during the height of the couple's popularity. However, ratings rose after the family appeared, and fans responded positively. Jackson's portrayal of Lucky was also welcomed and received praise from critics. Allison Waldman of The Huffington Post reflected in 2008: "Jonathan came onto the show with huge expectations thrust upon him. He was Luke and Laura's son, Lucas Lorenzo Spencer, Jr. – Lucky. He had to be up to speed in scenes with Genie Francis and Anthony Geary. (...) Jonathan was perfect right out of the gate; he looked, sounded and acted like he'd be Luke's kid. He was sensitive like Laura, too, not just a smart ass kid." In 1995, Jackson won his first Daytime Emmy Award for Outstanding Younger Actor in a Drama Series and his first Soap Opera Digest Award for Outstanding Child Actor. He was nominated for Young Artist Awards in 1996, 1997 and 1999. He won The Hollywood Reporter's YoungStar Award in 1995, 1997, 1998 and 1999, and was nominated in 2000. He again won Daytime Emmy Awards for Outstanding Younger Actor in 1998 and 1999, making him the record holder for the Younger Actor category, both with three wins and with six nominations. Jackson won the Soap Opera Digest Award for Outstanding Younger Lead Actor in 1999. During his teenage years as Lucky, Jackson became a popular "teen heartthrob" among fans, featured on fan magazines such as Tiger Beat and garnering many fan clubs and internet fansites.

=== Romance ===
During Jackson's first stint as Lucky, the character's relationship with Elizabeth Webber (Herbst) was called a supercouple, compared to Lucky's parents Luke and Laura. The characters first became popular during the storyline of Elizabeth's rape in 1998, a storyline that received critical acclaim. Viewers wrote to the series praising the story and how it helped rape victims to heal. The storyline won General Hospital a SHINE Award (Sexual Health IN Entertainment) in 1998. Fans also responded to Jackson's performance; Robyn Flans of Soap Opera Magazine stated in 1998: "Jonathan's sensitive portrayal of a young man experiencing the awakening of his own male stirrings while horrified by this hideous act of violence has been magnificent, and you have an amazing character – one that Jackson manipulates to perfection." Lucky and Elizabeth's romantic relationship took place gradually as result of the rape, and viewers liked the slow pacing that made the relationship honest and innocent, something unique among soap opera couples at the time. Each character dealing with personal issues, the couple's first kiss happened months into the relationship, and was anticipated and celebrated by fans. The series used the popular teen characters as an opportunity to reach young viewers with a social message through Lucky and Elizabeth's decision to abstain from sex. Executive producer at the time Wendy Riche explained her desire to show the decisions and pressures teenagers face, stating to Soap Opera Weekly: "We have the opportunity with these beloved characters who have struggled together and who have loved together and who are exploring sexuality together to reach an audience that doesn't really want to be preached to, but wants to feel it." Herbst and Jackson's popularity continued after Jackson's April 1999 departure; that July they were voted number one actor, actress and couple by fans of Soaps In Depth.

=== Recasts ===
“In the soap world, there are very few roles that can't be recast, but this may be one of them. The role of Lucky is so much Jonathan Jackson's because viewers watched him grow up and it will be very difficult for any actor to not only fill his acting shoes, but to win over viewer's hearts."

— Soap Opera Update in 1999, on the potential of recasting Lucky.

When Jackson left the role in 1999, a recast was opposed by viewers and costars. When Jackson's departure had previously been rumored in 1996, Anthony Geary (Luke) told TV Guide that he "went to (the GH powers) and said, 'If we lose him, then let's kill Lucky.' Jonathan is too much a part of us to replace him." Geary repeated these sentiments when Jackson confirmed leaving in 1999. When a recast was rumored in early 2000, Jackson stated: "When all the actors who are going to be working with the character don't want it, it's kind of too bad that they still do it. But I don't really get surprised with a lot of things that they do." The role was recast with Jacob Young, and by the time he appeared on-screen in February 2000, the character had been off-screen for almost a year, speculated to be an attempt to ease the transition between actors due to Jackson's popularity. Young was able to become accepted by fans; in 2001, Candace Havens wrote in The Free Lance–Star: "His hard work has paid off and many fans can't even remember there was ever someone else in the role." Young was named Sexiest Soap Star by People magazine in 2001. In 2002, Young won a Daytime Emmy Award for Outstanding Younger Actor. Greg Vaughan, who took over the role from 2003 to 2009, was the only portrayer of Lucky not to be nominated for an Emmy award. However, Vaughan did have a fan following. He was chosen by ABC Daytime and SOAPnet to participate in their 2008 Hot Guys Calendar, featuring popular male costars from ABC soap operas. At the start of 2008, Zap2it named Vaughan No. 6 on their Top 10 Most Improved list, stating: "The gorgeous Mr. Vaughan plays angry and sexy very well. Thank goodness we're getting to see it." During Vaughan's tenure, Lucky entered into a relationship with Sam McCall (Kelly Monaco) that was popular with fans. Zap2it named them No. 6 on their list of Top Couples of 2007, and tied them for No. 3 in 2008 along with entangled couple Elizabeth (Herbst) and Jason Morgan (Steve Burton), stating: "[Lucky and Sam were] conceived out of a revenge plot, yet quickly surprised fans and execs alike with their instant chemistry. Is the Quad in for another partner-switching shake-up in 2009?" When Vaughan left in 2009, he reflected on his reception: "I am grateful as to how the fans embraced me, whether they liked me or not. It was my job to win them over and I did that in due time." Some felt Vaughan was not a good fit for the character. In April 2008, Allison Waldman of The Huffington Post named Jackson as one of the top ten actors to make an impact on General Hospital, stating: "He's still the real Lucky to many people, even though two other actors have subsequently played the part."

=== Jackson's reprisal ===
When Jackson was hired to reprise the role in 2009, his return was highly anticipated, but accompanied by controversy as Vaughan was let go in order to bring Jackson back. Fans had a bittersweet reaction to the switch. The network promoted Jackson's return with the phrase, "Elizabeth's first love is back!", which angered some of Vaughan's fans. However, ratings rose the week Jackson returned, and his performance was well received. Jackson was nominated for the Daytime Emmy Award for Outstanding Supporting Actor in a Drama Series in 2010, only having been with the show for three months of 2009. Jackson's return changed the dynamic of the Elizabeth and Nikolas affair storyline, which had a negative reception from fans who thought it did not align with the history between Herbst and Jackson. The scenes in early 2010 where Lucky confronts Elizabeth and Nikolas about their affair received praise. That April, We Love Soaps named Jackson No. 26 of the top 50 Greatest Soap Actors, Damon L. Jacobs commenting: "From that first scene as Lucky in the Canadian diner, to his recent scenes of betrayal railing against Elizabeth and Nikolas, Jonathan adds a profound depth and spiritual gravity to the scripted words that is far beyond his years. His piercing bloodshot eyes shoot daggers far more deadly than Sonny's guns, and his smile encapsulates all that was celebrated about Luke and Laura's connection." Michael Logan of TV Guide named Jackson the best actor of 2010, referencing the affair confrontation when stating:

Jackson's performance in those episodes was seismic, full of fury and anguish and a soul-wrenching complexity that left me breathless. I don't for a minute think GH will push him for one of the two lead actor slots on the Emmy pre-nom ballot – certainly not with alpha dogs Tony Geary (Luke) and Maurice Benard (Sonny [Cortinthos]) taking up space – so he'll likely be dismissed to the supporting category. But make no mistake about it: Jackson was more brilliant and memorable than any other leading man in soaps.

Jackson submitted those scenes for the 38th Daytime Emmy Awards, where he won his fourth Daytime Emmy Award and first win as Outstanding Supporting Actor. The scenes were compared to classics such as Judith Light's performance of Karen Wolek's courtroom confession scene on One Life to Live and Kim Zimmer’s performance of Reva Shayne's fountain scene on Guiding Light. Jackson's on-screen chemistry with Erin Chambers (Siobhan) also had a positive reception at the end of 2010. However the following year they were rated the No. 6 Worst Soap Opera Couple of 2011 by Zap2it, who stated: "We spent 2011 desperately clinging to those few early memories, as Siobhan transformed from an appealing character into a shrill, insecure harpy (...) Try as Jackson and Chambers might, the actors were unable to salvage an ounce of their prior appeal as a couple." On the other hand, the entertainment website named Jackson No. 3 of the Top 10 Male Entertainers that year. Jackson had a range of emotional work in 2011 that received acclaim, including the scenes following the death of Lucky's son Jake, a storyline met by criticism by some fans. In 2012, Jackson won his fifth Daytime Emmy Award for his scenes where Lucky tells Luke that Luke was the driver that hit Jake and confronts him about his drinking. When Jackson was nominated, On-Air On-Soaps stated:

Jonathan Jackson's work on GH in 2011 was transcendent. Storyline after storyline he delivered in spectacular fashion; acting acrobatics and realism, and such emotional depth to the life of Lucky Spencer that we the viewers cried right along with him. If any nominee up for this year's Daytime Emmy had a banner year, it was Jackson.

In 2024, Michael Fairman named Jackson's return as his "Worst Return" for his "Best and Worst in Soaps 2024" listing. In his write-up, Fairman called out the writer's material, believing they "could not have set up his return worse". He also noted how the character spent weeks "lamenting whether he should just go back to Africa, and it all came off as wishy-washy, deadbeat dad syndrome." In conclusion, Fairman noted his hope for a "major story" for Jackson in the role.

== See also ==
- Lucky Spencer and Elizabeth Webber
