= Lucky Spencer and Elizabeth Webber =

Lucky and Elizabeth
- General Hospital character
- Jonathan Jackson and Rebecca Herbst as Lucky and Elizabeth, December 2009
- Duration: 1997–2002; 2005–2007; 2009–2010; 2024–present
- Created by: Robert Guza, Jr. (Note: While seeds for the couple's story were planted during Janet Iacobuzio and Christopher Whitesell's tenure, Lucky and Elizabeth's actual romance doesn't start until the spring of 1998 during Guza's tenure.)
- Introduced by: Wendy Riche
In-universe information
- Other names: L&L, L&L2
- Family: Spencer; Webber
- Spouse: 2005–07
- Sons: Cameron Spencer; Jacob Spencer; Aiden Spencer

Lucas Lorenzo "Lucky" Spencer Jr. and Elizabeth Imogene Webber are fictional characters and a supercouple from the ABC Daytime soap opera, General Hospital. Lucky Spencer is the son of supercouple Luke and Laura, played by Anthony Geary and Genie Francis. Elizabeth Webber is the granddaughter of original General Hospital character, Steve Hardy (John Beradino), and long-time character Audrey March Hardy (Rachel Ames). Lucky was originated by Jonathan Jackson in 1993, who continued to play the role when Rebecca Herbst originated Elizabeth in 1997. Jackson left the series in 1999, and Lucky was played by Jacob Young and later Greg Vaughan, who was let go in 2009 to allow Jackson to reprise the role. Jackson left the series in December 2011 and the role was not recast. Jackson returned to the role in 2015 and full time in 2024. Herbst portrayed the couple with each actor, and has been the only contract actress to play Elizabeth.

The couple first rose to popularity in early 1998 when Lucky helps Elizabeth recover after she has been kidnapped and raped. The teenagers take part in a slow and innocent romance, interrupted in 1999 when Lucky is presumed dead in a fire. He returns brainwashed in 2000, eventually resulting in their break-up in 2002. The couple reunites and marries in 2005, facing financial struggles, and Lucky becomes a father figure to Elizabeth's son Cameron. Lucky's involvement in drug addiction in 2006 leads to infidelity, and they divorce twice in 2007 after Lucky learns he is not the biological father of Elizabeth's son Jake. They get engaged again in 2009, but split up when Lucky learns of Elizabeth's affair with his brother Nikolas Cassadine (Tyler Christopher). They remain connected through the death of their son Jake, and learning that Lucky is the father of Elizabeth's son Aiden. Elizabeth helps Lucky through his drug relapse in 2011, but he refuses to reconcile and leaves for Ireland. Lucky briefly returned in 2015 with Jake's return and full time in 2024.

Lucky and Elizabeth were first called a supercouple as teenagers, commonly referred to by the portmanteau "L&L" or "L&L2" on internet message boards due to their similarities to Lucky's parents Luke and Laura. Viewers praised the recovery of Elizabeth's rape as helping other victims to heal, and the couple's innocent relationship aimed to show the option of sexual abstinence to younger viewers. The chemistry between Jackson and Herbst is often cited as part of their success. Both won Soap Opera Digest Awards during their popular 1999 storyline. In 2008, Lucky and Elizabeth were named No. 9 of ABC Daytime's Top 100 Greatest Couples by Soaps In Depth.

== Casting ==
The role of Lucky Spencer was originated on October 29, 1993 by Jonathan Jackson, and Rebecca Herbst originated the role of Elizabeth Webber on August 1, 1997. During 1998 and 1999, rumors circulated various times concerning Jackson's departure, either to attend college or pursue more film roles. Jackson briefly extended his contract in early 1999, stating to Soap Opera Digest: "Seeing how much the fans are enjoying [the Lucky and Liz relationship], I wanted to do a little more with it before I left." Jackson exited the series shortly thereafter and last appeared on May 24, 1999, at the height of the duo's popularity as a young supercouple. Surrounding Jackson's exit, rumors circulated about Herbst's departure. In early 2000, Jackson stated he would like to reprise the role but his schedule would not permit it. He suggested a short-term return that would coincide with Herbst's departure should she not renew her contract, allowing for periodic returns from the couple later on. Although Herbst also expressed interest, the show wanted to keep the characters on canvas. Herbst resigned in July for three years. Fans were weary of a new actor playing Lucky; while rumors circulated in October 1999, Soap Opera Update wrote: "Lucky and Liz were a true daytime supecouple thanks to the undeniable chemistry between Herbst and Jackson. That magic is hard to duplicate in a recast."

The role of Lucky was recast with Jacob Young on February 25, 2000, almost a year after Jackson's last appearance, speculated to be an attempt to ease the transition between characters due to Jackson's popularity. In November 2000, Young and Herbst guest starred on the FOX network sketch comedy series MADtv, making small cameos as Lucky and Elizabeth. Young did not renew his contract, and left the series on February 10, 2003. Greg Vaughan stepped into the role on February 20, 2003. In September 2009, ABC announced that Vaughan had decided to leave to explore other opportunities, and that Jackson would be reprising the role. However, Vaughan announced via Twitter that it was the network that decided to let him go. Vaughan last aired on October 20, 2009, while Jackson first aired on October 27, 2009.

On January 18, 2011, it was announced that Herbst had been let go from General Hospital and ABC stated her exit would be storyline dictated. Jackson was one of many costars to speak out, stating: "I'm heartbroken over the news about Becky. She is absolutely irreplaceable; an incredible actress and a phenomenal person. I'm confident the future has brilliant things in store for her! Right now, I'm just speechless and deeply disappointed." After much fan protest, a month later ABC released another statement saying that Herbst would retain her role on the show. In November 2011, it was announced that Jackson would vacate the role of Lucky due to the large amount of work he was receiving. TV Guide reported that on top of lighter scheduling requests, Jackson had also attempted to negotiate with the network to be repaired with on-screen love interest Herbst, but was denied. Jackson confirmed the character would not die or be recast, and last appeared the week of December 19, 2011.

== History ==
=== Early years, 1997–99 ===
Lucky and Elizabeth meet for the first time in August 1997. Liz has a huge crush on Lucky, but Lucky is interested in Elizabeth's beautiful sister, Sarah Webber (then Jennifer Sky). In February 1998, Elizabeth believes they have a date for the Valentine's Day dance, but decides not to go when she finds out that Lucky is going with Sarah. While crossing through the park home, Elizabeth is abducted at gunpoint, beaten, raped, and left for dead. Lucky finds her battered & bruised and brings her to his house, where he calls his Aunt Bobbie Spencer (Jacklyn Zeman), a nurse. Lucky feels responsible for not meeting her at the dance, and becomes very protective of Elizabeth. He treats her gently and patiently, becoming the main person she is able to trust after the kidnapping and rape. Meanwhile, Lucky's hostile half brother Nikolas Cassadine (then Tyler Christopher) reveals to him that Lucky's father, Luke (Anthony Geary), raped his mother, Laura (Genie Francis). Lucky is so furious with his parents for hiding the truth that he moves out of their home and begins to crash in various places around Port Charles. While Lucky helps Liz to recover, Liz in turn helps Lucky deal with the betrayal he feels from his parents. In a 1998 interview with Soap Opera Digest, Jackson explained: "Liz is the only person who [Lucky] trusts right now and feels comfortable around. There's going to be a lot of tension, especially for Lucky, because there's that natural instinct to get close to her. But you can't really do that because of what she's been through. He can't really make that move." In the same interview, Herbst added: "I think for Liz, Lucky is her whole world right now. He's her protector and her provider. It started as this crush, but it has gone deeper than that." Elizabeth also helps Lucky foster a relationship with Nikolas, with the help of their friend Emily Quartermaine (then Amber Tamblyn). The couples begin to refer to themselves as the "Four Musketeers." Lucky and Elizabeth continue to become inseparable, and Liz leaves home and joins Lucky for a short time. They sleep in the catacombs of Wyndamere and spend a night in a department store, similar to Luke and Laura’s adventures years before.

"They've made love in many ways already. Mentally, emotionally... all that good, old-fashioned lovemaking."

— Herbst, on Liz and Lucky’s decision to not have sex.

The two fall deeply in love. However, their physical relationship is slow moving, with Elizabeth coping with her rape, and Lucky dealing with his fear of having similar sexually violent tendencies as his father. Their much anticipated first kiss in October 1998 is preceded by Lucky serenading Elizabeth with a song he wrote for her. Herbst explained in a 1998 interview that Jackson helped plan the scene, wanting there to be "acknowledgement that they were each crossing a line and it felt comfortable and right. Both of them have their concerns, but both of them, have their wants." On Valentine's Day 1999, Lucky takes Elizabeth to a church and they exchange vows. In April they take a trip to New York City and plan their futures together, but refrain from having sex. Head writer at the time Robert Guza, Jr. elaborated to Soap Opera Digest: "A lot of times for a couple this age, not making love could cause a rift. But this does just the opposite. It brings them closer than ever, if you can imagine." Both Lucky and Liz feel it is the happiest time in their life. However, soon after, Lucky is presumably killed in a fire, leaving Elizabeth devastated. During Lucky's funeral, it is revealed that Lucky is alive and being held captive by Cesar Faison (Anders Hove) and Helena Cassadine (Constance Towers).

=== Lucky's return, 2000–03 ===
Lucky and Elizabeth (Young and Herbst, pictured) in December 2001.

In February 2000, Faison reveals to Luke that Lucky is alive, and Luke and Laura leave to track Lucky down. Helena lets Lucky (now Jacob Young) go and it is soon apparent Lucky has been brainwashed. He pushes away his parents and Elizabeth. Dr. Kevin Collins (Jon Lindstrom) is able to break through the lower levels of programming, but Helena uses the Ice Princess diamond to hypnotize Lucky on a deeper level, making Lucky act violently and erratically. In an effort to fight Helena's control, Lucky proposes to Elizabeth. Although shocked, she accepts. Helena gives Lucky a diamond to give Elizabeth that triggers his brainwashing. Lucky is arrested for attacking Stefan Cassadine (Stephen Nichols), and escapes jail on Helena's orders. Elizabeth finds him and convinces him to get help.

Nikolas (then Stephen Martines, credited as Coltin Scott) pretends to go back to the Cassadine family in order to learn Helena's plan. When Helena makes Lucky inject Luke with drugs, he realizes he cannot control his actions and ends his engagement. Elizabeth kidnaps Lucky to keep him safe, and they make up. Nikolas tries to trick Helena into showing him the trigger for Lucky’s programming, but she brainwashes Lucky alone and removes his memories of loving Elizabeth. Elizabeth steals the Ice Princess, and although Lucky gets better at fighting Helena's control, he is still unable to love Elizabeth. Nikolas and Elizabeth fake her death in order to make Helena believe Nikolas is loyal. Lucky has visions of Elizabeth, and their love helps him break Helena's control. When Helena takes several hostages in her lab, she is unable to make Lucky do her bidding and her plan is thwarted. Lucky and Liz reunite, and despite Lucky not being able to recover his love for Elizabeth, he proposes and they plan a New Year's Eve wedding. When Gia Campbell (Marisa Ramirez) tells Liz the truth, the wedding is called off. The couple tries to start over but struggles. Liz’s sister Sarah (now Sarah Laine) returns and has romantic tension with Lucky. Elizabeth finds out Lucky and Sarah kissed and breaks up with him. She later finds them having sex, solidifying the break up. Sarah soon becomes jealous of Lucky's attention to Elizabeth and leaves town, and Elizabeth and Lucky stay good friends. TVSource Magazine commented on the change of Lucky's character during Young's tenure: "The brainwashing eventually wore off, but the character never really gelled with the brave, strong, compassionate and loyal son of Luke Spencer that Jackson had created."

=== Marriage, infidelity and divorce, 2004–08 ===
Lucky and Elizabeth (Vaughan and Herbst, pictured) in 2008, with children Jacob Spencer and Cameron Spencer.

“I identify more with the older version of Lucky than the youthful version. They're more set in their ways now. But that's pretty much the only way I know [Lucky and Elizabeth] since they've been reunited, taking him on as somebody who has an occupation, going through the financial struggles of an adult, taking care of a child and significant other that he wants to spend the rest of his life with."

— Vaughan, on portraying the adult version of Lucky and Liz's relationship.

In 2004, Lucky (now Greg Vaughan) and Elizabeth reconnect while they work together to save Emily from Helena's attempts to kill her, and help Nikolas evade charges for Helena's supposed death. Helena shoots Lucky, putting him into a coma, and they get back together when he wakes up. They eventually move in together, and their financial struggles prompt Elizabeth to serve as a surrogate mother for Courtney (Alicia Leigh Willis) and Jasper Jacks (Ingo Rademacher), upsetting Lucky. Elizabeth miscarries in September 2005, and Lucky comforts her. They marry in October, and Lucky acts as a father figure to her son, Cameron. They get into a train crash during their honeymoon where Lucky almost dies. In 2006, Elizabeth is kidnapped by Manny Ruiz and Jason comes to her aid, hurting Lucky's pride. Lucky sustains a serious back injury during the incident, and becomes addicted to his painkillers during the stress of his recovery. He becomes paranoid that Elizabeth is having an affair with Patrick Drake. He starts getting pills from Maxie Jones (Kirsten Storms) and starts having an affair with her. In August, Elizabeth catches them in bed together and sleeps with Jason. Elizabeth later learns that she is pregnant and Jason is the father, but keeps it a secret while Lucky goes to rehab and they divorce. Elizabeth hopes to keep the baby safe from Jason's lifestyle and keep Lucky from relapsing by claiming him as the father. Lucky makes a drastic character change away from his previously known quick thinking and street smarts, he is oblivious to Elizabeth's lies of Jake's paternity, and also when Maxie Jones fakes a pregnancy. TVSource Magazine called Lucky “Port Charles' bumbling police detective who just can't catch a break,” while Entertainment Weekly stated he was “a character who's been written as earnest (he's Johnny Law to his father's rebel) if not the brightest bulb (a girlfriend’s fake pregnancy, Elizabeth’s carrying another man’s child).” Liz and Lucky remarry in March 2007 and Elizabeth gives birth to Jacob Spencer that May. Elizabeth seeks Jason's help when Jake is kidnapped and their continued friendship causes both Lucky and Jason’s girlfriend, Sam McCall (Kelly Monaco) to become jealous. In November 2007 Lucky discovers the truth about Jake's paternity but agrees to keep the paternity a secret to protect Jake. Angry with Elizabeth, Sam begins an affair with Lucky as payback. Elizabeth and Lucky continue to drift apart and divorce again.

=== Lucky vs Nikolas, 2009–10 ===
"What it is... brokenness, and that is really a devastating thing when you love somebody, and to have that wounding and betrayal, it’s terrible. I am sure many can relate to what we have been through on-air. It was tragic."

— Jackson, on the fallout of Liz and Nikolas's affair.

In February 2009, Lucky stays by Elizabeth's bedside after she is poisoned by a biotoxin, but the two decide to stay friends and not resume a romantic relationship. When Lucky begins dating Rebecca Shaw (Natalia Livingston), Nikolas (reprised by Christopher) kisses Elizabeth to make Lucky and Rebecca jealous. Lucky and Elizabeth are prompted to get back together, however Elizabeth finds herself attracted to Nikolas. She sleeps with him in September 2009, returning home that night to accept Lucky's marriage proposal. Jackson reprised the role of Lucky in October, changing the dynamic of the story. Jackson commented to The Huffington Post: "I've come back and jumped onto a moving train. What Becky [Herbst] and I originally established with our love story changes the hue of what's happening now. Her settling to be with Lucky doesn't fly with the foundation and the chemistry that Becky and I have." Elizabeth is unable to stop the affair and struggles with her guilt while she and Lucky plan their future. Herbst explained:

I truly believe that [Elizabeth] is in love with Lucky and has been in love with him her entire life. But what happened with Nikolas caught her by surprise as much as everybody else. It’s hard for her to articulate it. She just knows that Nikolas did make her feel more like a woman and that in her relationship with Lucky she’s very much still that 16-year-old girl that constantly needs to be saved. That’s kind of the role that Lucky has played in her life.

That New Year's Eve the couple recreates the night when Lucky asked Elizabeth to be his girlfriend. Elizabeth gives Lucky his old guitar, and the couple make many references to their popular 1990s storyline. In January 2010, Lucky finds Elizabeth and Nikolas having sex, but does not confront them. Instead he destroys the Spencer home and begins drinking. J Benard Jones from entertainment website Zap2it described that Lucky: "generally was an emotional wreck, careening all over the place like a pinball. On the other hand, whenever Lucky was with Elizabeth or Nikolas he was cold and detached, imbuing just enough of Jackson's trademark sincerity (some would say over-earnestness) to knock the two cheatin' hearts off-kilter." Lucky is irate by the time he confronts them. Herbst described: "It was terrible, those scenes! [Elizabeth] totally deserved it, so it did not make it that hard for me to play. All I had to do was listen to Jonathan, and I felt so guilty." Jackson spoke of the confrontation: "It is difficult, you know? Because I really love them as people, so to have to go there (...) As soon as the director would yell 'Cut', I'd say, 'I'm sorry, Becky!', because I felt horrible."

"I hope that somehow we preserve the integrity of the characters. As Jonathan pointed out before, [Elizabeth]'s already mothered two children that [Lucky] wished were his. Just think about the implications if this child actually ends up being Nikolas’s. For him to once again stand by her side, that’s a tough thing to sell. (...) I hope we find a way to at least salvage all of our dignity in all of this."

— Christopher, on Elizabeth and Nikolas's affair.

On Valentine's Day, Liz returns to the church where they said their vows as teenagers and passes out from hypothermia. Lucky finds her and takes her to the hospital where they learn she is pregnant and either Nikolas or Lucky could be the father. Jackson explained Lucky’s position: "This is potentially the third child that she’s had with someone else besides him so I think it’s extraordinarily painful and sort of over-the-top emotionally. That little percentage of possibility that it could be his scares the crap out of him because if it was his he would have to deal with reconciliation and forgiveness, not even being with her necessarily, just even having to heal some of the wounds. Either way, it’s a horrible situation." In a separate interview, Jackson went on to state that while on the surface the character may not want the child to be his, deep down he thinks a part of Lucky does. Both Jackson and Herbst added that they personally hoped the child would be Lucky's. Herbst explained that Elizabeth hopes Lucky is the father because it is the only way she can salvage their relationship, and has a difficult time coming to terms with Lucky not wanting her anymore. After Lucky has to talk Elizabeth down off the roof of the hospital, she is admitted into Shadybrook. In March, Helena Cassadine alters the DNA test results show Nikolas as the father. In July, Elizabeth gives birth to Aiden Alexi Nikolossovich Cassadine, who is shortly kidnapped by Franco (James Franco). Lucky finds Aiden and returns him. When asked if the couple could reunite after the affair, Jackson responded: "I do think that is possible. But it would have to take time, and be an incredible sort of process of forgiveness and newness, and that would be a redemption and rebirth. I love to play that because it is something we all go through in life and they are very human emotions. (...) It's going to be two people who have been torn apart trying to find a way to love each other and not loving each other the way they used to, but truly having to fall in love again." In a separate interview, Herbst stated:

I don’t think they have ruined them. They have taken a different path. We can’t be the same kids we were ten years ago. We are adults now, and in the soap world adults have to have baggage and problems. There has to be issues and this is the way it goes. We can’t be two adults hiding in boxcars like we used to.

=== Lucky's relapse, 2011 ===
In 2011, head writer at the time Garin Wolf hinted: "Lucky and Elizabeth both have a huge journey in front of them – fun, different paths that they're going to take that no one will see coming. That's all I'm going to say." In March 2011, Elizabeth is reading a new DNA test that shows Lucky to be Aiden's father when Jake wanders outside and is rendered braindead from a hit and run accident. Elizabeth is furious with Jason when he asks her to donate Jake’s kidney to Josslyn Jacks, who is suffering from kidney cancer. Lucky convinces Elizabeth into letting Jake go in order to save Josslyn and other children like her. Jackson explained the effect of Jake's death: "I think whenever a child is in danger, even if the parents aren't a couple anymore, there's going to be a very deep emotional connection between them for the sake of their child, so it certainly creates a new dynamic for Lucky and Elizabeth." It is learned that Luke Spencer was the driver who hit Jake, and Lucky accuses him of drunk driving. Luke begins on a downward spiral, and Lucky arranges an unsuccessful intervention. Meanwhile, in the aftermath of Jake's death, Elizabeth does not tell Lucky about Aiden's paternity, especially after she sees him happy with Siobhan McKenna (Erin Chambers) at the ceremony of their green card marriage. After an unsuccessful trip to bring Luke home, Lucky sets the Spencer house on fire and accidentally injures Siobhan. Elizabeth tells Lucky the truth about Aiden to stop him from drinking. Nikolas does not believe Elizabeth, and briefly plans to take Aiden out of the country before changing his mind and returning him. He says goodbye to Lucky and leaves town. Elizabeth finds out she accidentally gave Siobhan the wrong medication during surgery, and although Lucky believes it was an accident, Siobhan does not and begins a rivalry with Elizabeth. In the aftermath of Jake's death, Jackson responded to inquiries of a reunion between Lucky and Elizabeth:

I have no idea in terms of where the show is going with that, but from my little subjective corner, I think that's absolutely a possibility. I think the connection with the fans is pretty strong with the history that's there. It's a great romantic situation right now. There's a lot of people who are really excited about Lucky and Siobhan and then there are a lot of people who are very excited about a potential reunion with Lucky and Elizabeth. So that's a good place to be in terms of having that kind of romantic conflict.

"The answer can't be to always have one of the two people betray the other one and have the whole thing fall apart because the characters end up compromising everything about themselves. (...) That would be the challenge: how do you create drama and suspense nuances but maintain the integrity of the characters?"

— Jackson in 2011, on his request for a Lucky and Elizabeth reunion.

Lucky volunteers for an undercover drug case, making Siobhan worry he will relapse. Elizabeth supports Lucky and tries to help him obtain information from the hospital. Anthony Zacchara (Bruce Weitz) has Lucky injected with drugs. After a series of hallucinations, Liz finds him and tries to talk him down. She goes to get medicine while Lucky runs off to the church and hallucinates the night he and Elizabeth said their vows in 1999. Meanwhile, Elizabeth gets into a confrontation with Siobhan, and Siobhan falls down a flight of stairs. While driving Siobhan to the hospital, Liz loses control of the car while try to keep Siobhan conscious and crashes the car. After getting Siobhan to the hospital she realizes where Lucky must have gone and gives him medication. Siobhan survives surgery, but later dies after she is poisoned by Anthony Zacchara. When Lucky finds her dead, he starts taking pills again. Elizabeth continues to have faith in him, and when she is kidnapped by Anthony's men, Lucky saves her. Elizabeth tries to reconcile with Lucky, but refuses, saying they always end up hurting each other. He struggles to overcome his addiction again and takes a trip to Ireland as Siobhan's dying wish. He receives a mysterious message that Aiden is ill just in time to get him to the hospital. Elizabeth fakes a mental breakdown to get Lucky's attention, and when he finds out she is lying he leaves town permanently. Lucky leaves town to facilitate Jackson leaving the series, stating one of his reasons being the delay of a reunion between Lucky and Elizabeth. He explained:

I think the fans want [a reunion], too. I was away from 'GH' for 10 years and came back (in 2009) specifically to work with certain people. (...) I absolutely love working with [Herbst] and love it when our characters are together romantically. Even though things have gotten crazy between Liz and Lucky over the years, there's still a deep potential for something powerful and redemptive there. So it seemed like a real no-brainer to me. From my perspective, I just assumed they'd get back together. Maybe it's a timing problem. There have been big changes in the writing team at 'GH' and that may have shifted the timeline for Lucky and Elizabeth to reunite. Or maybe it just wasn't ever going to happen at all. I don't know.

== Reception and impact ==
“This is one relationship that's as refreshingly honest as they come with characters as real and sweet as their portrayers."

— Soap Opera Magazine in 1998, on the popularity of Lucky and Liz.

Lucky and Elizabeth first made a supercouple name for themselves during the storyline of Elizabeth's rape in 1998. The young couple was compared to the romance of Lucky's parents Luke and Laura, notorious supercouple of the 1980s. As a result, they are commonly referred to by the portmanteau "L&L" or "L&L2" on internet message boards. Similar to the nuances of other supercouples, Lucky always calls Liz by a certain name, a popular detail to fans. Jackson explained to Soap Opera Magazine that it was his idea: "I just made a decision that I wanted to call her Elizabeth. I don't know why. I really like the name. I think it's beautiful – and I also think she has a different relationship with him. Everyone else may call her Liz, but to him she's Elizabeth." As the on-screen couple took the start of their relationship slow, their popularity with fans grew quickly. The gradual timing of the relationship was one reason for the popularity, as viewers watched them blossom from friends to something more. The slow progression made viewers feel the relationship was honest and innocent, something unique among soap opera couples at the time. Jackson described in a 1999 interview, “What's been portrayed is what people want to see. A kind of pure romance and pure love." Herbst commented to Soap Opera Digest in 1998: "I think one of the reasons why people like them so much is because their relationship is so healthy. (...) Individually they have their own issues and problems that they need to work out. But I think people like seeing that – they like seeing them work out their problems together." Elizabeth and Lucky first grow close as friends, while Lucky helps Liz deal with her rape and Liz helps Lucky deal with his family issues. Another factor in the couple's rise to supercouple status was the chemistry between original portrayers of the couple, Herbst and Jackson. Their chemistry grew as they bonded during Elizabeth's rape. Herbst explained in a 1998 interview:

When I get on the set every morning – as soon as I'm Liz – I just want to be hugged by him. Jonathan and I have really bonded through this whole thing. I really depended on him to help me through it. I think he knew that I was scared to death to act this out, and he was right there with me, just as leery, but still being the man role model.

The slow progression of the couple's physical relationship was another reason for its success. Each character dealing with personal issues, the couple’s first kiss happened months into the relationship, and was much anticipated and celebrated by fans. The gradual pacing continued when the couple decided to wait to have sex, shortly before Lucky is presumed dead in April 1999 and off-screen for close to a year. Herbst and Jackson’s popularity continued after his departure; that July they were still voted number one actor, actress and couple by fans of Soaps In Depth.

=== Impact ===
"There were a lot of people that had been through some form of abuse that wrote in and would say how amazing the storyline was and how it was very healing for them. I know that it impacted people on many levels."

— Jackson, on the effect of the rape storyline.

The storyline of Elizabeth's rape was initially seen with some controversy, but the story of Elizabeth's recovery benefited viewers and received critical acclaim. Victims of abuse wrote in to the series, saying the story helped them to heal. Viewers related to Elizabeth, and spoke out that watching her heal showed them they could as well. Herbst stated in 1998:

I got so much mail, especially the first two weeks after Liz's rape aired. I got letters from people talking about how they were raped as a child, or that their mother was. A couple of them said that they hadn't talked about it with anybody, but that this storyline has helped them a lot. They thanked us for portraying it in a way that was very real to them. They've thought about it and realized that they're okay – the way Liz is okay. She may be hurt and damaged, but she's alive.

Herbst commented that the story helped her to be more aware and better understand the process of recovering from rape, and that she was glad to be able to help others cope. Herbst was seen as a role model to female viewers. The storyline won General Hospital a SHINE Award (Sexual Health IN Entertainment) in 1998. Both Herbst and Jackson received praise for their portrayals. Herbst continued to be well received throughout Liz's recovery, as she confronted her suspected rapist and later on her actual rapist. Soap Opera Magazine named Herbst Star of the Week in October 1998 when Elizabeth confronted her teacher, mistakenly believing him to be her rapist. When she was faced with her actual rapist, Soap Opera News described the scene: "We felt each transition in Liz's thoughts and feelings. We felt her fear. Then we felt her anger. Then we felt her take control over the situation. We experienced each experience with her. A television set no longer existed. The audience was in that photo studio, standing beside her, repulsed by this man." In 1999, Robyn Flans of Soap Opera Magazine spoke of Jackson: "Jonathan's sensitive portrayal of a young man experiencing the awakening of his own male stirrings while horrified by this hideous act of violence has been magnificent, and you have an amazing character – one that Jackson manipulates to perfection."

"We have the opportunity with these beloved characters who have struggled together and who have loved together and who are exploring sexuality together to reach an audience that doesn't really want to be preached to, but wants to feel it."

— Executive Producer Wendy Riche on reaching young viewers.

The couple also influenced viewers with their decision to abstain from sex. Executive producer at the time Wendy Riche explained her intent on showing the decisions about sex that teenagers are faced with, such as whether or not they are ready and using protection. Riche added that Elizabeth would portray the pressure young girls typically feel about agreeing to having sex. The characters were normal and relatable, making them a good choice to try to reach young viewers with a social message. Head writer at the time Robert Guza, Jr. explained to Soap Opera Weekly: "They are young people, but they are old beyond their age – very wise souls. (...) It's not like these are street kids who are irresponsible and deeply, deeply in love with each other. (...) What happens when you take a couple like that who are so connected and you bring up the question of sexuality as opposed to a couple who weren't as connected and would be talking to other people and pretending one thing to each other and something else with somebody else. That's not this dynamic at all. Liz and Lucky don't play games with one another." Jackson spoke on the message of abstinence, stating he felt that viewers should not make decisions based on what television characters do, but that he hoped the story would encourage young viewers to discuss sex with their parents more, and to understand that they have options.

=== Jackson's return ===
“We've worked together for so long, when I was a teen and now again... it's all just kind of there. All available. She's such a great actress. So willing to go there. We didn't need to do anything special.”

— Jackson, on preparing with Herbst for Jake's death scenes.

When Jackson returned to the series in 2009, he stated the chemistry with Herbst was still there and thought it would help with whichever direction their storyline went. Both actors spoke out on their on-screen relationship during Jackson’s return. Herbst explained: "I have such a special place in my heart for Jonathan. He was the one I worked with right from the beginning. (...) We had great chemistry a million years ago, and we have a great chemistry now." In a separate interview, Jackson spoke of Herbst: “The chemistry that we have together is very strong and very good with the romance, the love story with Lucky and Elizabeth, so that’s always gonna be there.”

Viewers speculated and anticipated that with Jackson's return, the couple might reunite. Abby West from Entertainment Weekly commented that Jackson and Herbst still had an easy rapport, but wondered if the couple's chemistry would translate to the characters as adults. Jackson returned to the storyline of Elizabeth having an affair with Lucky's brother Nikolas. This changed the dynamic of the story, and some fans disliked the affair due to the history between Jackson and Herbst. Others disliked the coupling of Elizabeth and Nikolas altogether; Zap2it named them the No. 7 Worst Soap Couple of 2009, stating: "The return of Jonathan Jackson as the original Lucky (...) has only made this ridiculous affair even more unbearable. There is no way Liz would do this to the sweet, charming boy who saw her through her rape nightmare all those years ago." The scenes in early 2010 where Lucky confronts Elizabeth and Nikolas about the affair received praise. They were deemed a soap opera classic, compared to Judith Light's performance of Karen Wolek's courtroom confession scene on One Life to Live and Kim Zimmer’s performance of Reva Shayne's fountain scene on Guiding Light. The couple also received praise in 2011 during the death of their son Jake. Regan Cellura from Zap2it stated: "Lucky's scenes (...) opposite Elizabeth are reminiscent to those that made Lucky and Liz a young supercouple." During the storyline, Jackson was asked by The Huffington Post if Lucky and Elizabeth should end up together, answering:

It would be a little hard to deny the connection that fans have had with the Lucky and Elizabeth storyline since its inception. It was a very unique love story at the time with Elizabeth healing from the rape and Lucky being there for her. There was purity and romance and it was just something that really connected with people in a huge, huge way. That connection is still there.

=== Awards and recognition ===
The portrayers of both Lucky and Elizabeth won numerous awards. Jackson, who had won his first Daytime Emmy Award for Outstanding Younger Actor in a Drama Series and Soap Opera Digest Award for Outstanding Child Actor in 1995, again won in 1998 and 1999 for his work during the couple's story arc. In 1999, both Jackson and Herbst won Soap Opera Digest Awards for Outstanding Young Lead Actor and Actress, respectively. Herbst was also nominated in 1999 for the Daytime Emmy Award for Outstanding Younger Actress in a Drama Series. Jacob Young, who took over the role in 2000, earned the Daytime Emmy Award for Outstanding Younger Actor in 2002 for his portrayal of Lucky. Herbst received a nomination for the Daytime Emmy Award for Outstanding Supporting Actress in a Drama Series in 2007. In 2008, Lucky and Elizabeth were named No. 9 by Soaps In Depth of the Top 100 Greatest Couples of ABC Daytime. In March 2011, TV Guide's Nelson Branco proclaimed Lucky and Liz as one of the only remaining supercouples on General Hospital. Herbst received another Daytime Emmy nomination for Outstanding Supporting Actress in 2012, and Jackson, who reprised the role in late 2009, won the Daytime Emmy Award for Outstanding Supporting Actor in a Drama Series in 2011 and 2012.

== See also ==
- List of supercouples
