= Mermaids (2003 film) =

- DVD cover
- Screenplay by: Daniel Cerone
- Story by: Brent V. Friedman; Rebecca Swanson; Daniel Cerone
- Directed by: Ian Barry
- Starring: Nikita Ager; Erika Heynatz; Sarah Laine
- Theme music composer: Roger Mason
- Countries of origin: United States; Australia
- Original language: English

Production
- Producers: Ian Barry; Martin Brown; Michele Brustin; Timothy O. Johnson
- Editor: Neil Thumpston
- Running time: 84 minutes
- Production companies: Taylor Brown Corporation; Viacom Productions

Original release
- Network: PAX TV
- Release: November 15, 2003

Mermaids is a 2003 television film directed by Ian Barry and starring Sarah Laine, Nikita Ager and Australian model Erika Heynatz as a trio of mermaid sisters who band together to avenge their father's death. The film is also known in other languages as Sereias (Brazil), Três Sereias (Portugal), Mermaids - Las sirenas (Spain), Oi treis gorgones (Greece), Seireenisiskokset (Finland), Sirènes (France), Siren as (Argentina and Mexico), Русалки (Bulgaria and Russia), Sirene (Croatia), Mořské panny (Czech Republic), and Morské panny (Slovakia).

== Plot ==
Unscrupulous fisherman John Mallick and his assistant Carlo are fishing with soda bombs in open water to harvest coral reefs when they notice a large creature thrashing in the water. Mallick shoots it and discovers that it's a merman. They attempt to collect the body, but the vessel is knocked by a powerful force. Mallick sees a figure in the water pointing a trident at him, and he and Carlo escape without the body of the merman.

The figure is Diana, the merman's eldest daughter. She has superhuman strength and a magical trident that turns into a comb she can wear in her hair. Diana buries her father's body. Although she loathes humans, Diana ventures onto land for the first time to seek out her sisters, Venus and June, to help her find Mallick and justice for their father's murder.

The middle sister, Venus, is working in a cafe, where she swims in a tank with a fake mermaid tail. When Diana finds her, she is appalled by her sister's behavior and suspects that there is another reason behind her choosing to perform for humans. The youngest sister June has lived among humans for three years and is working at a sea park. June is in love with Randy, a marine patrolman who has a long-term girlfriend named Cynthia. Although the three sisters don't get along because of their differing life choices, they agree to band together to find Mallick.

June and Randy are aware of Mallick's illegal fishing and attempt to hunt him down together. At one point, Randy boards Mallick's boat in search of evidence, but Mallick and Carlo knock him unconscious into the sea. June rescues him and drags him to shore. It is gradually revealed that Randy is unhappy with Cynthia and he falls in love with June instead.

Diana discovers that Venus is forced to work at the cafe because the owner Earl Barker has taken her pearl tiara: her birthright of magic that gives anyone who holds it power over the owner. Diana forces Earl to give up the tiara and also finds a large seashell, the birthright of another mermaid. Venus realizes that it belongs to Earl's middle-aged wife Betty, who has forgotten her mermaid heritage. Venus returns the shell, but Betty decides to stay on land because she has a human daughter.

The three sisters learn that Mallick has discovered their father's body and is keeping it in a freezer. They confront him, but Mallick has researched mermaids and knows that they must grant one wish to anyone who asks for it. He asks them to find him a chest of sunken treasure. The sisters agree, but work on a plan: Venus finds the gold, Diana finds their father's body, and June asks for Randy's help, accidentally revealing her true identity as a mermaid which Randy happily accepts. When the sisters deliver the gold, the police also arrive at Mallick's warehouse. When they check the freezer, the merman's tail has transformed back into legs as the freezer is dry, and they arrest Mallick for murder.

June worries that Randy is ignoring her and Venus confesses that she used her siren ability to make Randy forget the events of the previous few days to keep the sisters' mermaid secret safe. June is crushed, but decides to stay on land in hopes of another chance with Randy. Venus wants to stay with her as all her previous time on land has been as a prisoner and she wants to explore it on her own terms. To the surprise of her sisters, Diana decides to stay on land as well so that she can watch over her younger sisters as their father would have wanted. The film ends on the implication that the three sisters will have many other adventures together.

== Cast ==
- Nikita Ager as Venus
- Erika Heynatz as Diana
- Sarah Laine as June
- Daniel Frederiksen as Randy
- Sean Taylor as Mallick
- Jason Chong as Carlo
- Geneviève Lemon as Betty
- Brittany Byrnes as Tess
- Holly Brisley as Young Betty
- Lara Cox as Cynthia
- Gyton Grantley as Tim
- Robert Coleby as Director
- Andy Anderson as Officer Krutchen
- Sally McKenzie as Georgia

== Influences ==
The film borrows elements from Hans Christian Andersen's 1837 fairy tale "The Little Mermaid". As part of the film's mythology, merpeople are said to live for hundreds of years, but do not have an immortal soul. There is also a legend that states that if a human loves a merperson, they will share half of their soul.

June's subplot in the film is also derived from the Hans Christian Andersen story. June saves the life of her beloved when he is about to drown. When June drags him to shore, he is half-conscious, but only manages to see a vague shadow of her. Later, at the end of the film, Randy decides to marry his fiancée, Cynthia, as he does not know that June was the one who saved his life

In this version of mermaid mythology, merpeople are magical creatures who gain legs when dry and a tail when wet, an idea that was made famous by the film Splash. The three sisters also seem to be able to break glass from screaming and/or screeching like whales or dolphins much like Madison. Just like the earlier parts of Splash, Diana was naked when she came to land and became human. Unlike Madison, Diana steals the clothes from one of the surfers that advances on her.

The subplot involving Earl and his mermaid wife Betty seems to be derived from the story of "The Mermaid of Gollerus" also known as "The enchanted cap", a famous Irish tale in which a man named Dick Fitzgerald finds a mermaid's red cap and marries the green-haired mermaid it belongs to. The film seems to substitute the cap for the sea shell Diana finds, this also seems to be where they got the idea of taking "the item of power/birth right" from the mermaid as it is a major part of the fable and the way that Mr Fitzgerald is able to keep his mermaid wife with him much like Earl Barker does with Betty and Venus.

The mermaids in the movie are also bound to grant one wish of anyone who asks it of them, no matter if it is literal or metaphorical. The three sisters in the film also have other magical abilities: Diana has super strength and Venus can hypnotize men to obey her. June is shown talking to sea creatures (like a sea lion at the sea park) and Venus is seen lifting a heavy treasure chest telekinetically underwater but it is unknown if these abilities are exclusive to each.

== See also ==
- Mermaids in popular culture
