= Flight of the Living Dead: Outbreak on a Plane =

- Teaser poster for the film
- Directed by: Scott Thomas
- Written by: Scott Thomas; Mark Onspaugh; Sidney Iwanter
- Produced by: David Shoshan
- Starring: David Chisum; Kristen Kerr; Kevin J. O'Connor; Derek Webster; Dale Midkiff; Erick Avari; Richard Tyson
- Music by: Nathan Wang
- Distributed by: Imageworks Entertainment; Pacific Entertainment Group
- Release dates: 30 June 2007 (Los Angeles Film Festival); 5 May 2007 (London sci fi film festival)

Flight of the Living Dead: Outbreak on a Plane is a 2007 direct-to-video zombie film by director Scott Thomas. Thomas co-wrote the screenplay with Mark Onspaugh and Sidney Iwanter. The film was originally titled Plane Dead, but the title was changed at Montreal's 2007 Fantasia Festival screening. In spite of a successful screening there and at other festivals, the film did not gain a commercial release and was issued directly to DVD in unrated form.

== Plot ==
On a routine flight from Los Angeles to Paris, a renegade group of scientists have smuggled aboard a secret container holding a fellow scientist infected with a deadly genetically engineered virus which reanimates the dead. The virus is said to be a variant of the "malaria virus." They discovered and manufactured the virus with the intent of turning it into a biological weapon. Their goal was to produce "super soldiers" who could continue fighting in the harshest conditions, including being mortally wounded or under heavy enemy fire. The virus has to be transmitted through bodily fluids. The infected have superhuman abilities, including sprinting and leaping beyond human capabilities. The zombies also become very durable, as one survived being turned into partial mulch after being chucked into an airplane engine.

The 747-200 encounters massive thunderstorms, and the violent motions from turbulence releases one of the infected scientists from its cargo hold. At first, the scientist that emerged from her storage appears normal, though she has no idea where she is. Screen flashes of blood and germs indicate her succumbing to the mutated strain. The box she was in was apparently kept at low temperatures to keep her in stasis and to quell the more powerful malaria. She spots a guard, who lost his leg after heavy boxes landed on him, severing one leg. She pleads with him to ask where she is, only to be shot by the wounded guard who also inadvertently destroys the communication system. Two of the scientists go below to ascertain if the container has been damaged by the turbulence, along with the co-pilot. They are subsequently ambushed by the lady (she would be considered Patient Zero) and the now infected guard. The zombies then manage to break into the passenger hold, starting a zombie outbreak. The uninfected passengers must fight for survival aboard the flight. No government will allow the infected airliner to land, leaving the survivors stranded in the sky with their ravenous tormentors. Billy, his wife Anna, Burrows, Frank, Paul, and Megan, a stewardess aboard the plane, are all that are left of the uninfected. They must make their way to the cockpit and signal a fighter jet behind them that there are still living people aboard the 747 or the fighter will destroy them with a homing missile strike. After managing to get a MP5K machine gun from the dead guard, Burrows, Frank and Billy make their way from the tail of the plane to the cockpit, while the couple stay behind. Billy is bitten but manages to kill some of the undead passengers before the virus takes hold of him. When Anna comes to help Billy, she gets bitten but kills a zombie by thrusting an umbrella into its mouth. The zombies then attempt to overrun them, but Billy opens the emergency exit and most of the infected get sucked out.

Frank and Burrows make it to the First Class upper deck and access the cockpit where Frank kills the zombie copilot and pilot, and the two of them try to get the plane off autopilot and signal the fighter which fires at them. They are ultimately successful and waggle the plane's wings, alerting the fighter. The fighter pilot hits the abort key and the missile explodes away from the 747, but close enough to the plane to open a hole in the side. All the zombies are apparently sucked out. Frank and Burrows try to control the plane, but hit a mountain and crash land near Las Vegas, Nevada.

As the survivors walk toward the city, apparently some of the zombies also survived the crash, and they lurch toward the city as well.

== Cast ==
- David Chisum as Truman Burrows
- Kristen Kerr as Megan
- Kevin J. O'Connor as Frank Strathmore
- Richard Tyson as Paul Judd
- Raymond J. Barry as Capt. Ray Banyon
- Todd Babcock as 1st Officer Randy Stafford
- Derek Webster as William "Long Shot" Freeman
- Erick Avari as Leo Bennett
- Siena Goines as Anna Freeman
- Brian Thompson as Kevin
- Heidi Marnhout as Emily
- Sarah Laine as Cara
- Brian Kolodziej as Peter
- Brian Ames as Tony
- Mieko Hillman as Stacy
- Dale Midkiff as Dr. Lucas Thorp
- Cliff Weisman as Dr. Sebastian
- Ashley Bashioum as Jackie
- David Feldman as Porter
- Tucker Smallwood as Col. Wolff
- Michael Tomlinson as Madison
- Rick Murke as Fighter Pilot
- Laura Cayouette as Dr. Kelly Thorp
- Claudia Katz as Nun
- Danielle Nicole as Lizzy

== Reception ==
On review aggregator Rotten Tomatoes, the film holds an approval rating of 89% based on nine reviews.

== See also ==
- Snakes on a Plane
- Quarantine 2: Terminal
