= Scott Thomas (director) =

American film director

Scott Thomas is an American director, screenwriter, producer and creator of Pacific Entertainment Group Inc.

== Filmography ==
=== Director ===
- A Place to Hide (1988)
- Silent Assassins (1988) (co-director)
- One West Waikiki (1996) (TV series) (episode "Rest in Peace")
- Anacardium AKA Deranged (2001)
- Latin Dragon (2004)
- Yesterday's Dreams (2005)
- Flight of the Living Dead: Outbreak on a Plane (2007)

=== Writer ===
- NightMan (1997) (TV series)
- Anacardium AKA Deranged (2001)
- Latin Dragon (2004)
- Flight of the Living Dead: Outbreak on a Plane (2007)

=== Producer ===
- Hard Knox (1984) (TV movie) (supervising producer)
- Two Fathers' Justice (1985) (TV movie) (supervising producer)
- Charley Hannah (1986) (TV movie) (supervising producer)
- Jesse Hawkes (1989) (TV series) (supervising producer)
- P.S. I Luv U (1991) (TV series) (supervising producer for 1 episode)
- X-Men (1992–1996) (TV series) (supervising producer for 63 episodes)
- The Color of Evening (1994) (co-producer)
- One West Waikiki (1994–1996) (TV series) (producer for 18 episodes)
- Ultraforce (1995) (TV series) (executive producer for 13 episodes)
- Gargoyles: The Goliath Chronicles (1996) (TV series) (supervising producer for 1 episode)
- NightMan (1997) (TV series) (producer for 3 episodes)
- NightMan (1997) (TV movie) (producer)
- Blue Hill Avenue (2001) (supervising producer)
- Latin Dragon (2004) (producer)
- Flight of the Living Dead: Outbreak on a Plane (2007) (producer)
