= Siena Goines =

American film and television actress

- Born: Washington, D.C.
- Occupation: Actress
- Years active: 1995–present

Siena Goines is an American film and television actress, her credits include The Young and the Restless (1998-2000), Judging Amy (2000-2004), The Sweetest Thing (2002), The 40-Year-Old Virgin (2005), and Flight of the Living Dead: Outbreak on a Plane (2007), Deputy and Westworld (2020).

== Early life and career ==
Goines was born in Washington, D.C. From 1998 to 2000, Goines played the role of Callie Rogers on the CBS daytime soap opera, The Young and the Restless, where she earned an NAACP Image Award nomination for Outstanding Actress in a Daytime Drama 2000. From 2000-2004, Goines played a recurring role of Mia in the CBS drama Judging Amy.

She appeared in The Sweetest Thing (2002) , The 40-Year-Old Virgin (2005), and Flight of the Living Dead: Outbreak on a Plane (2007). In 2007, Goines had a recurring role as Sarah Mason in the CBS drama Jericho.

In 2020, Goines was cast as a Television Series Regular as Rachel Delgado on FOX's Deputy, and the same year she starred in an episode of Westworld.

== Filmography ==
=== Film ===
Year	Title	Role	Notes
1996	Co-ed Call Girl	Jody	TV movie
1996	The Rockford Files: Friends and Foul Play	Candace Clark	TV movie
1998	Restaurant	Carol	
2000	In the Weeds	Katie	
2002	Joe and Max	Marva Lewis	TV movie
2002	The Sweetest Thing	Tammy	
2004	Rancid	Angela Morris	
2005	My Short Film	Studio Exec	Short
2005	The 40-Year-Old Virgin	Woman at Speed Dating	
2006	Only in Miami	Tanya	Short
2006	Sucka Punch	Monica	Video short
2007	Flight of the Living Dead: Outbreak on a Plane	Anna Freeman	
2007	Throwing Stars	Lynn	
2007	The Mannsfield 12	Nadine	
2007	Jekyll	Christy	
2008	Jada	Jada	
2009	The Least Among You	Ruth Kelly	
2009	Creature of Darkness	Karla	
2009	The Divided	Rebecca	
2016	The Last Punch	Brenda Cornelius	
2016	Nina	Heather	
2016	Lost Girls	Mrs. Sanchez	Short
2016	Brothers in Atlanta	Simone	TV movie
2017	Capture	Cathy	Short
2018	Bachelor Lions	Jane Cross	
2018	What Still Remains	JoAnn	

=== Television ===
Year	Title	Role	Notes
1995	In the House	Janice	Episode: "Dog Catchers"
1996	The Big Easy	Isabella	Episode: "Crawdaddy"
1997	Women: Stories of Passion	Mya	Episode: "Grip Till It Hurts"
1997	Days of Our Lives	Carol Michaels	Episode: "Episode #1.8114"
1998	Chicago Hope	Tanya Worrell	Episode: "Bridge over Troubled Watters"
1998	Push	Mia	Recurring cast
1998–2000	The Magnificent Seven	Rain	Episode: "Ghosts of the Confederacy" & "Penance"
1998–2000	The Young and the Restless	Callie Rogers Stark	Regular Cast
2000–04	Judging Amy	Mia	Recurring cast: season 2-5
2001	Charmed	Inspirational Muse	Episode: "Muse to My Ears"
2004	The Division	Willa	Episode: "The Box" & "Zero Tolerance: Part 1"
2006	Windfall	-	Episode: "Pilot"
2007	Passions	Valerie Davis	Regular Cast
2007	Jericho	Sarah Mason	Recurring cast: season 1
2007	Tell Me You Love Me	Saskia	Episode: "Episode #1.3 & #1.8"
2008–09	Private Practice	Claudia Jenkins	Episode: "Worlds Apart" & "Contamination"
2010	Castle	Donna Vincennes	Episode: "The Third Man"
2010	Futurestates	Rika	Episode: "The Rise"
2010–11	Chase	Natalie	Recurring cast
2011	Criminal Minds	Tsia Mosely	Recurring cast: Season 6
2011	Necessary Roughness	Shannon	Episode: "Whose Team Are You On?"
2011	Strictly Sexual: The Series	Autumn	Recurring cast
2012	The Beauty Inside	Alex #9	Episode: "Hello My Name Is Alex"
2016	Days of Our Lives	Simone Michaels	Episode: "Episode #1.12844"
2018	Andi Mack	Pat Driscoll	Recurring cast: season 2
2019	Grey's Anatomy	Natasha Deon	Episode: "Help, I'm Alive" & "Girlfriend in a Coma"
2019	Chicago Med	Alice Novak	Episode: "Can't Unring That Bell"
2020	Deputy	Deputy Rachel Quinn	Episode: "Graduation Day"
2020	Westworld	Dr. Natasha Lang	Episode: "Decoherence"
2020	Casting The Net	Holly	Main cast
