= Deputy (TV series) =

American Western procedural drama television series

- Genre: Crime drama; Police procedural
- Created by: Will Beall
- Starring: Stephen Dorff; Yara Martinez; Brian Van Holt; Bex Taylor-Klaus; Siena Goines; Shane Paul McGhie; Mark Moses; Danielle Moné Truitt
- Country of origin: United States
- Original language: English
- No. of seasons: 1
- No. of episodes: 13

Production
- Executive producers: Will Beall; David Ayer; Chris Long; Barry Schindel; Kimberly Ann Harrison; John Coveny
- Camera setup: Single-camera
- Running time: 44 minutes
- Production companies: Carcharodon Films (pilot); Cedar Park Entertainment; Entertainment One Television; Fox Entertainment (pilot); XOF Productions

Original release
- Network: Fox
- Release: January 2 – March 26, 2020

Deputy is an American procedural drama television series created by Will Beall. The project started development in October 2018. Fox made a put pilot commitment in January 2019 and then ordered to series in May 2019. The series aired from January 2 to March 26, 2020. In April 2020, Fox canceled the series after one season.

== Cast ==
=== Main ===
- Stephen Dorff as Deputy Sergeant/Sheriff Bill Hollister, who assumes the mantle of Los Angeles County Sheriff after his predecessor dies of a heart attack. With a reputation for playing by his own rules and defying the system, Bill intends to restore what he believes is a lost sense of honor and duty among his officers.
- Yara Martinez as Dr. Paula Reyes, Bill's supportive wife and a trauma surgeon.
- Brian Van Holt as Deputy Cade Ward, a former Marine-turned-sheriff's deputy who overcame a difficult childhood as a foster child.
- Bex Taylor-Klaus as Deputy (later Detective) Brianna Bishop, a seasoned investigator in the Sheriff's office assigned to Bill's personal security detail when he becomes sheriff. Despite their reservations about his unorthodox style of leadership, they view him as the best chance to reform the department.
- Siena Goines as Deputy Rachel Delgado, Ward's partner who leaves active duty after being shot during a raid.
- Shane Paul McGhie as Deputy Joseph Harris, a rookie deputy, Bill's god son, and the son of Bill's late partner who joins the department in part to honor his father's sacrifice.
- Mark Moses as Undersheriff Jerry London, Bill's second-in-command. He views his new boss with contempt, given his refusal to follow police procedure or respect the rules of the bureaucracy.
- Danielle Moné Truitt as Deputy Charlie Minnick, a seasoned deputy who was in a secret relationship with her superior, Deputy Gabriel Luna, until his death. She later becomes Harris's second training officer, replacing Luna.

=== Recurring ===
- Natalia Cigliuti as Teresa Ward, a lawyer and Cade's wife.
- Valeria Jauregui as Maggie Hollister, Bill and Paula's teenage daughter.
- Danny Soto as Bobby Perez
- Gianna Gallegos as Camilla
- Sarah Minnich as Deputy Sara Book
- Josh Helman as Deputy Carter, a friend of Harris who encourages him to loosen up.
- Jenny Gago as Anjelica Reyes, Paula's mother and Maggie's grandmother
- Jaime Ray Newman as Carol Riley, a DA who becomes a candidate for sheriff. She begins an investigation into Bill's involvement in the Johnson case, learning the names of several CIs that one of her aides leaks. London forces her to resign as DA and end her campaign for sheriff, on the threat that he will reveal that her recklessness led to several good people being killed.
- Michael Harney as William Hollister Sr. Bills father, a widower and retired LASD deputy. Its implied he has dementia.

=== Guest ===
- Bobby Naderi as Deputy Gabriel Luna, a training officer who oversees the department's new class of deputies. He was in a relationship with Minnick, and was Harris's initial training officer until he was killed in a convenience store shooting.
- Karrueche Tran as Genevieve, Bishop's girlfriend.
- Jason Wiles as David Browder, an inmate dying from cancer.
- Meg Smith as Taylor, Maggie's friend.
- Lex Lotito as Suki, Maggie's other friend.

== Episodes ==
No.	Title	Directed by	Written by	Original release date	U.S viewers (millions)
1	"Graduation Day"	David Ayer	Will Beall	January 2, 2020 (Note: The episode was first released online on fox.com, the FOX app, and Hulu on January 1, 2020.)	4.75
Following the sudden death of his superior Bradford, Bill Hollister, as his longest-serving mounted deputy, is appointed as Sheriff until elections can be held. Finding himself thrust into a world where politics overlap with police priorities, Bill defies protocol by personally taking part in a raid on a gang hideout, during which a gangster is killed in front of his children. Bill encourages his friend Cade to consider adopting the children since he and his wife are having trouble conceiving. Bill's godson Joseph is attacked while on duty at the county jail; an inmate steals his uniform and escapes. Under intense scrutiny, Bill contemplates resigning, but both his wife and his subordinate Bishop persuade him otherwise. After shutting down an ICE operation he considers ethically wrong, Bill takes Bishop and Cade on a mounted assault to rescue the kidnapped daughter of a cartel money launderer using information provided by Joseph. Bishop kills the inmate, the girl is saved, and the launderer agrees to cooperate. Cade tells his newly adopted son that if he intends to take revenge for his father's death, he'll have to stay and watch him. Bill stops Joseph from quitting, but refuses to put him on the front lines.
2	"10-8 Outlaws"	David Ayer	Kimberly Ann Harrison	January 9, 2020	4.03
Bill continues to struggle with the responsibilities of his new office, which largely entail taking care of bureaucratic tasks he finds dull and boring and stepping away from the day-to-day grind of catching criminals. All that changes when Roman Burgin (Jack Kesy)—a man who Bill has long despised—returns to crime after getting out of jail. Bill sets up a manhunt and insists on taking part against Bishop's advice. While preparing for his first day on patrol, Joseph sees his instructor Luna sharing a kiss with fellow Deputy Minnick, a potential violation of department rules. Joseph agrees to keep silent at Luna's request. Burgin steals money and a motorbike from a cartel drop point and prepares to flee across the border; Bill orders the highways to be shut down in response. Angered by both his boss' arrogant attitude and his wife serving him divorce papers, Undersheriff London brings Minnick into a plan to undermine Bill. Burgin is intercepted and taken into custody. That night, Bill meets Bishop's girlfriend Genevieve and gives Cade advice on parenting. While picking up food and drinks with Joseph, Luna is shot and critically wounded.
3	"10-8 Deputy Down"	Chris Grismer	John Coveny	January 16, 2020	3.66
In the aftermath of Luna's shooting, the entire department makes finding his assailant their highest priority. However, Bill denies Joseph's request to join in, assigning him to Luna's security detail. A heartbroken Minnick convinces him to help her arrest a man who had threatened Luna, which turns out to be one of his informants maintaining his cover. Bill and Cade utilize Bill's old friend, a barber they refer to as "The Mayor", to help them track the gun used in the shooting. This leads them to a paroled convict who admits he already sold the weapon. London tries to embarrass Bill by falsely announcing the shooter's arrest to the media. Luna dies from complications from surgery and his death is formally reported to the department. Based on the suspect's word, Bill finds the real shooter, a mentally ill man named Donald Murphy who shot Luna after mistaking him for his abusive father. Rather than let his deputies pursue and potentially shoot Murphy, Bill personally arrests him. Joseph gives Minnick a lost necklace Luna gifted to her, earning her forgiveness.
4	"10-8 Firestone"	Milan Cheylov	Story by : Atticus East; Teleplay by : Clay Senechal & John Coveny	January 23, 2020	3.26
Valeria, a former informant of Bill's from when he worked Narcotics as a deputy, is arrested during a raid on a smuggler's house. Bill brings her to his home for safety, where Paula discovers that she and her husband were once in a relationship until he was stabbed protecting her, which was the same night they first met. A social worker tells Cade and Theresa that they need to determine if their adopted children want to stay with them. Minnick is assigned as Joseph's new training officer, and secretly accepts an offer from London to use her position to spy on Bill so she won't risk a promised promotion. Bill gets in touch with DHS, who agree to put Valeria in witness protection if she turns on her employers. She names her fellow smuggler as Ernesto Diaz, who Bill orders to be released from custody, correctly suspecting that his fellow gangsters will torture him out of fear that he talked. Cade leads a squad to arrest the cartel members, while Ernesto flees and is run over trying to escape. With his dying breath, he tells Bill that the cartel will find Valeria. Joseph goes out for a drink, but the bartender ignores him. A stranger then invites him over to his table.
5	"10-8 Black & Blue"	Chris Grismer	Kimberly Ann Harrison & Gregory Yeoman	January 30, 2020	3.34
Matthew Evans, a childhood friend of Joseph's, is accused of murdering drug kingpin Trent Anderson. Although Evans insists he wasn't responsible, Bill checks in with Johnson, the LAPD detective handling the case, and learns that he was in contact with Anderson with plans to start dealing himself. Joseph's efforts to investigate the shooting are also complicated by the hostility shown towards him as a black police officer; Minnick steps in to offer her insights about how to deal with having two separate, yet mutually exclusive identities. Paula asks to be fired when told the hospital is cutting her department's funding, but Bill tells her to stay and fight. An associate of Evans bails him out with the intention of silencing him. Joseph and Minnick catch him red-handed and the shooter flips, revealing that Johnson is dirty and had Trent killed to hide his crimes. Bill takes him into custody, aware that doing so will antagonize the LAPD. Cade learns that Theresa might finally be pregnant. London decides to run for sheriff. Bill goes to see his elderly father Will, who is slowly losing his mental facilities, and takes him out riding.
6	"10-8 Do No Harm"	Rachel Leiterman	Rick Dunkle	February 6, 2020	3.52
London finalizes his divorce, and asks Bill to endorse him as sheriff to avoid an ugly campaign. While on duty at the county jail, Paula and her staff are taken hostage by an inmate, David Browder, and his psychotic girlfriend Rose; she demands, at gunpoint, that Paula perform lifesaving surgery on her boyfriend. Against London's advice that he's too emotionally invested, Bill takes charge and cuts a deal with Rose to trade some of the hostages for medical equipment. However, when he tries to breach the jail, he learns that Rose has anticipated this, having made extensive preparations. Bill makes the only move he has left: offering himself as a hostage, along with a promise that he'll help them escape, in return for Paula 's release. The surgery is completed, and Rose agrees to the deal. Bill instructs Cade to snipe Rose when they get to the roof, but she figures out the plan and takes him, Paula, and the rest of the hostages onto the roof in disguises. As the chopper descends, Bill pulls off his disguise, giving Cade just enough time to shoot Rose. David is placed under arrest, and Bill and Paula have a tearful reunion with Maggie.
7	"10-8 Search and Rescue"	Toa Fraser	Ian McCulloch	February 13, 2020	3.42
In the midst of a large fire consuming Santa Clarita, Bill joins Cade on an assignment to find a missing girl named Tulsa. They determine that Tulsa is a kidnapping victim and have Minnick and Joseph find the home of her abductor, rescuing another girl and a woman who turns out to be his wife. She admits that her husband is a serial killer who has been kidnapping young women he finds attractive and then taking them into the mountains to be murdered when they get too "old" for him. Cade has to stay behind when the abductor shoots a camper, so Bill continues the pursuit alone and finds Tulsa. He beats the abductor severely and arrests him. Bishop suffers a concussion in a car accident and spends some time in the hospital, where they snap at Paula for asking personal questions. Later, they visit the family home and reveals that they have been struggling with their gender identity for some time and have been taking male hormones. Maggie assaults a reporter while faking the flu to skip school. When Bill finds out, he tells Paula and Maggie that he wants them to help decide whether he should continue to serve as sheriff.
8	"10-8 Selfless"	Peter Leto	Clay Senechal	February 20, 2020	3.33
Cade stumbles across the case of a homeless veteran, who was beaten to death in his tent. Determined not to let the man's murder be written off like countless others, he visits the support group he'd been attending, which coincidentally is the group that helped save him years earlier when he was homeless. Bill comes under pressure from city administrators to either declare his candidacy or endorse London; despite his belief that London is not fit to be sheriff, Bill is concerned about the burdens of the job and how they affect his family. Cade gets a new lead when Joseph and Minnick find a security guard that matches a suspect description. The man is interrogated, and reveals he was paid to kill the veteran. By following the money, Bill arrests Neal Ahern, a wealthy developer who planned the murder in a bid to get the homeless removed from near his new building. Bishop gets Bill's consent for their decision to transfer to Major Crimes as an analyst. Anticipating Bill's formal announcement of his candidacy, Minnick accesses his department file to dig up dirt for London.
9	"10-8 Entitlements"	Laura Belsey	Kimberly Ann Harrison & Rick Dunkle	February 27, 2020	3.65
London uses leverage to force Bill to investigate a series of burglaries targeting wealthy homeowners (and prospective donors). Cade and Bishop learn that the thieves are bored rich boys engaging in a nationwide competition for fame and notoriety, but the stakes are suddenly raised when a woman is shot and nearly killed during a failed robbery. Paula's mother visits to help plan Maggie's quinceañera and discovers her granddaughter has a secret boyfriend. Bill meets with community activists at London's insistence; they pledge to throw their full support behind him should he choose to run. The boys are caught, and Bill successfully challenges London to do the right thing and charge them while declaring to the press that the city's affluent are in need of a reckoning. After saving Minnick's life, Joseph begins to seriously contemplate his growing feelings for her. Cade and Teresa are informed that the grandmother of their foster children has asked to see them. Bishop breaks up with their girlfriend when she refuses to accept their new identity. When Bill comes by, they ask to be called only Bishop from now on.
10	"10-8 School Ties"	Carol Banker	Ian McCulloch & William L. Rotko	March 5, 2020	3.34
DA Carol Riley announces her candidacy for sheriff, and rebuffs London's attempts to befriend her. Minnick's friend Isobel steals a bag of cash from a cartel enforcer, putting her life in danger. Bill meets Maggie's boyfriend Wyatt and grills him, upsetting her. Cade and Teresa let their children spend the day with their grandmother, and are shocked to learn that the arrangement could very well be permanent. Isobel calls Minnick and hides in a nearby library, where Minnick and Joseph track her while Bill and Cade deal with the enforcer's men. Isobel gets her hands on the enforcer's gun, but Minnick tells her to drop it and arrests him while ensuring she isn't charged. Bill offers Minnick her long-awaited promotion, but she refuses, saying she wants to finish Joseph's training. Bill contacts a reporter with damaging information about DA Riley, and gets Maggie to forgive him intruding on her personal choices. London asks Minnick to help him again, but she tells him their relationship is finished as she no longer feels comfortable betraying Bill's trust. London makes it clear he intends for Bill and Riley to destroy each other so he can be sheriff.
11	"10-8 Paperwork"	Ben Hernandez Bray	Clay Senechal & Bruce Zimmerman	March 12, 2020	3.53
DA Riley informs Bill that she will be investigating his involvement with the Johnson case. Minnick and Joseph bring in a man with a fake ID; Bishop reaches out to their contacts and learn that he's an up-and-coming cocaine trafficker set to close a major deal with a Mexican cartel. When cartel gunman attack the station while the trafficker stages a jailbreak, Joseph's quick thinking enables a rapid response, ending with Bill and Cade tracking down the fugitive and breaking up his operation in the process. Cade and Teresa are told that they need a strong case for why their kids' grandmother shouldn't get custody. Riley interviews several of Bill's officers, but they all refuse to cooperate and the investigation stalls. In response, she decides to begin digging into Bill's career history, prompting him to decide that he won't run to spare his family from being targeted. However, Paula, who believes that she and Maggie can survive whatever's thrown at them, convinces him otherwise. Joseph is left to fill out paperwork and talks with a fellow deputy, Carter, who gets him to ditch his responsibilities and go out for a drink.
12	"10-8 Agency"	Chris Grismer	Rick Dunkle & Ruth Ferrera	March 19, 2020	3.94
Bill's father-in-law Jorge prepares him for the impending declaration of his candidacy. Minnick and Joseph look into the murder of a wealthy man estranged from his adult children, and wrap the case up quickly when Bishop finds proof that the victim's trophy wife was stealing from him while engaged in an affair with his son. Cade goes to see his kids' grandmother to offer a compromise, but she refuses, they argue, and Cade fears that she'll use his outburst against him in court. Paula is unable to move past the trauma of being held hostage and finally goes to see Rose, telling her that she's no longer afraid and that Rose should have trusted her to save her boyfriend. DA Riley threatens to have Bill and Joseph slapped with criminal charges; Bill rebukes her and London offers her material that could destroy his campaign, so long as she agrees to let him win. Joseph witnesses Carter beating up a man and stops him, but when he lies to protect his friend, Minnick has no choice but to put him in temporary custody as punishment. Cade and Bishop inform Bill that someone has been targeting and murdering informants working for the department.
13	"10-8 Bulletproof"	Chris Grismer	Kimberly Ann Harrison	March 26, 2020	3.93
With bodies piling up, Bill learns that the Mayor has been abducted and orders his team to find the common link between all of the victims. In the midst of it all, Cade is informed that he and Teresa have lost their case and nearly gives into the temptation to drink until Bill steps in to remind him that the fight's not over yet. Carter tells Joseph that by lying for him, he's earned the right to join the "Lions", a group of cops who chafe at the rules of the Department. Joseph apologizes to Bill and tells Carter he's done associating with him. Bill discovers that Riley has been meeting with Johnson and obtained the list of informants from him, which one of her people has since leaked. Angry and enraged, he persuades Johnson to name the mole and has him arrested, then takes Bishop, Cade, London, Minnick, and Joseph to rescue the Mayor. The abductors are all killed, and Bill has just enough time to make it to Maggie's quinceañera with several of his friends. London forces Riley to drop her investigation and resign as DA, and shreds his material on Bill after deciding to run a clean campaign. Joseph and Minnick share a small kiss when he promises never to lie to her again.

== Production ==
=== Development ===
On February 5, 2019, it was announced that Fox had given the production a pilot order. The pilot was written by Will Beall and David Ayer who executive produces, along with Chris Long and Barry Schindel. Production companies involved with the pilot include Entertainment One and Fox Entertainment.

On May 9, 2019, it was announced that Fox had given the series order. A few days later, it was announced that the series would premiere as a mid-season replacement in the spring of 2020. On April 3, 2020, the series was canceled after one season.

=== Casting ===
In March 2019, it was announced that Stephen Dorff had joined the cast in the leading role, along with Yara Martinez, Brian Van Holt, Siena Goines, Bex Taylor-Klaus, Shane Paul McGhie and Mark Moses. In October 2019, it was announced that Karrueche Tran had joined the cast in a recurring role playing Genevieve. On January 28, 2020, Jenny Gago was cast in a recurring capacity.

== Release ==
=== Marketing ===
On May 13, 2019, Fox released the first official trailer for the series. On October 22, Fox released a preview clip confirming a January premiere.

== Reception ==
=== Critical response ===
On Rotten Tomatoes, the series holds an approval rating of 40% with an average rating of 5.8/10, based on 15 reviews. The website's critical consensus reads, "While those looking for a stylish new procedural with a few unexpected nuances will find much to like, Deputy sticks too closely to its genre guns to break any new ground." On Metacritic, it has a weighted average score of 51 out of 100, based on 10 critics, indicating "mixed or average reviews".

=== Rating ===
Viewership and ratings per episode of Deputy
No.	Title	Air date	Rating/share (18–49)	Viewers (millions)	DVR (18–49)	DVR viewers (millions)	Total (18–49)	Total viewers (millions)
1	"Graduation Day"	January 2, 2020	0.8/4	4.75	0.4	2.56	1.2	7.31
2	"10-8 Outlaws"	January 9, 2020	0.7/3	4.03	0.4	2.60	1.1	6.63
3	"10-8 Deputy Down"	January 16, 2020	0.6/4	3.66	0.5	2.81	1.1	6.48
4	"10-8 Firestone"	January 23, 2020	0.5/3	3.26	0.5	2.93	1.0	6.20
5	"10-8 Black & Blue"	January 30, 2020	0.6/3	3.34	0.4	2.58	1.0	5.93
6	"10-8 Do No Harm"	February 6, 2020	0.6/3	3.52	0.5	2.73	1.1	6.26
7	"10-8 Search and Rescue"	February 13, 2020	0.5/3	3.42	0.5	2.64	1.0	6.06
8	"10-8 Selfless"	February 20, 2020	0.5/3	3.33	0.5	2.72	1.0	6.05
9	"10-8 Entitlements"	February 27, 2020	0.6/3	3.65	0.5	2.72	1.1	6.37
10	"10-8 School Ties"	March 5, 2020	0.5/2	3.34	0.4	2.52	0.9	5.86
11	"10-8 Paperwork"	March 12, 2020	0.5/3	3.53	0.4	2.53	0.9	6.06
12	"10-8 Agency"	March 19, 2020	0.6/3	3.94	0.5	2.73	1.1	6.67
13	"10-8 Bulletproof"	March 26, 2020	0.5/2	3.93	0.5	2.58	1.0	6.52
