= Sarah Laine =

American actress

- Other name: Serah D'Laine
- Occupations: Actress, branding strategist, business coach
- Years active: 1999–2010 (film & TV)

Sarah Laine, also credited as Serah D'Laine, is an American former actress. She has appeared in several films, including in Wild Things: Diamonds in the Rough and Mermaids.

== Life and career ==
Laine made her acting debut in two episodes of the television series Passions in 1999. She played a small supporting role in the comedy American Pie 2 (2001). She had a recurring role as Dr. Sarah Webber on the daytime drama General Hospital in 2002. In the 2003 fantasy film Mermaids, she played one of the three mermaid sisters who kill their father's murderers. The made-for-television film was originally conceived as a pilot for a television series. She played a leading role in the erotic thriller Wild Things: Diamonds in the Rough (2005), where she portrays a rich young woman named Marie who is battling with her obnoxious stepfather over a pair of extremely valuable diamonds. She appeared in a larger role in the horror films Flight of the Living Dead (2007) and The Terror Experiment (2010).

Laine had her last acting credit in 2010, and as of 2013 had an adjunct faculty position at the Sedona Film School of the Yavapai College in Yavapai County, Arizona.

== Filmography ==
=== Film ===
- American Pie 2 (2001): Girl at Party
- Mermaids (2003): June
- Like Family (2004): Lisa
- The Rain Makers (2005): Allison
- Wild Things: Diamonds in the Rough (2005): Marie Clifton
- A.K.A. (2006)
- Wicked Wicked Games (2006): Dr. Megan Winters
- Flight of the Living Dead: Outbreak on a Plane (2007): Cara
- Parasomnia (2008): Young Nurse
- Redefining Love (2009): Jo
- Knuckle Draggers (2009): Erica
- The Rig (2010): Carey
- Here & Now (2010): Yolanda
- The Terror Experiment (Flight or Flight) (2010): Carol Milner

=== Television ===
- Roswell (1999): Elana
- Jake in Progress (2005): Kendra
- Cold Case (2007): Penny '38
