= SHINE Awards =

The SHINE Awards ("Sexual Health in Entertainment"), formerly known as the Nancy Susan Reynolds Awards, are annual media awards given by The Media Project since the mid-1980s, resulting from a partnership between the Kaiser Family Foundation and Advocates for Youth. They honor "those in the entertainment industry who do an exemplary job incorporating accurate and honest portrayals of sexuality into their programming."
