= Tyler Christopher (actor) =

American actor (1972–2023)

- Born: Tyler Christopher Baker; November 11, 1972; Joliet, Illinois, U.S.
- Died: October 31, 2023 (aged 50); San Diego, California, U.S.
- Other name: Tyler Baker
- Occupation: Actor
- Years active: 1993–2023
- Spouses: Eva Longoria (m. 2002; div. 2004); Brienne Pedigo (m. 2008; div. 2021)
- Children: 2
- Relatives: Derk Cheetwood (cousin)

Tyler Christopher Baker (November 11, 1972 – October 31, 2023) was an American actor. He was best known for his roles as Nikolas Cassadine (1996–1999, 2003–2011, 2013–2016) and Connor Bishop (2004–2005) on the ABC soap opera General Hospital.

In August 2016, it was announced that Christopher would be joining the cast of the NBC soap opera Days of Our Lives as the son of long-time villains Stefano DiMera and Vivian Alamain. His tenure on the show began December 29, 2017. Christopher left the series on March 20, 2019.

== Early life ==
Tyler Christopher Baker was born in the Chicago suburb of Joliet, Illinois, on November 11, 1972, to Jim and Jimi-Ann (née Stewart; 1941–2016) Baker and grew up in Delaware, Ohio, the youngest of four children. Though his parents believed they had Native American heritage, a DNA test taken by his father and sister showed no Native American ancestry.

Christopher attended Ohio Wesleyan University for two years.

== Career ==
In 1993, Christopher — then credited as Tyler Baker — auditioned for the role of Stone Cates for the soap opera General Hospital; the role was later cast with actor Michael Sutton. In April 1996, Christopher was cast in the role of Nikolas Cassadine for the series; he signed a three-year deal and filmed his first scenes in late June 1996. In June 1999, it was announced that Christopher opted not to renew his deal with the soap opera. Following his daytime departure, Christopher made guest appearances on primetime shows including Charmed, Angel, Felicity, and CSI: Crime Scene Investigation. In March 2003, it was announced that Christopher would return to General Hospital; then-executive producer Jill Farren Phelps described Christopher's return as an opportunity the series could not pass up.

In March 2011, Soap Opera Digest reported on their social media accounts that Christopher had been let go from the series, because of his casting on ABC Family's The Lying Game, produced by former General Hospital head writer Charles Pratt Jr. Christopher verified the reports of his firing to ABC Soaps In Depth; he explained that he had been released from his deal on Friday March 18, 2011, and the character of Nikolas was to be written out. Christopher's deal was set to expire in June and the date would have marked the beginning of the last 13 week-cycle period in his deal—at which time the network would notify the actor of their decision to offer another deal. While Christopher had previously admitted he was unsure about renewing his deal, he was open to working both shows and thought it was a likely possibility considering they were both under ABC. Christopher last appeared on June 30, 2011; he later returned for a three-day guest appearance from July 27 to July 30, 2011.

In March 2013, Christopher returned in a recurring capacity at General Hospital, while continuing to appear on The Lying Game. In June 2013, it was announced that Christopher had signed a deal to appear on a regular basis on General Hospital. The following month, it was announced that The Lying Game had been canceled after two seasons. In May 2016, actor Nick Stabile was temporarily cast in the role of Nikolas, with Christopher being unavailable, for an undisclosed amount of time. In September 2016, Soap Opera Digest reported that negotiations between Christopher and the serial had fallen apart, and that he would not be reprising his portrayal of Nikolas. Christopher made his last appearance on June 16, 2016.

In August 2017, it was announced that Christopher had joined the cast of Days of Our Lives in a newly created role. Christopher previously made a one-episode guest appearance on the soap in 2001. He made his first appearance as Stefan DiMera on December 29, 2017. His last episode was March 20, 2019.

== Personal life ==
Christopher was married to Eva Longoria from 2002 to 2004. He was previously engaged to General Hospital co-star Vanessa Marcil and dated Natalia Livingston. He and auto racing reporter Brienne Pedigo publicly announced their engagement in October 2006; Christopher and Pedigo married September 27, 2008. The couple had their first child, a son, on October 3, 2009. In October 2014, it was announced that Christopher and his wife were expecting their second child, due in May 2015. On May 3, 2015, Christopher announced on his official Twitter feed that Pedigo had given birth to a baby girl. Pedigo filed for divorce in February 2019.

In later years of his life, Christopher was open about his bipolar disorder and alcoholism. He claimed to have died three times in alcohol related instances. In November 2019 while Christopher was going through alcohol withdrawal, he experienced delirium tremens, leading to a fall during which he hit his head on the edge of a bathtub and sustained a traumatic brain injury. He underwent a craniotomy to relieve pressure on his brain.

After recovering from his head injury and ending a medical guardianship under his sister in September 2021, Christopher moved to Hollywood from Ohio to try to find work as an actor where he was homeless for the first six months. Before his death, he was close friends with General Hospital co-star Maurice Benard who is also diagnosed with bipolar disorder and gave support to Christopher.

=== Legal issues ===
On November 11, 2019, Christopher was arrested and charged with public intoxication in Martinsville, Morgan County, Indiana after falling asleep in the back of an Uber car. He pleaded guilty and paid a small fine.

From January 2020 to September 2021, Christopher was placed under the medical guardianship of his sister Susan Asmo Baker following a nearly fatal head injury. After requesting that the guardianship be ended and his sister approving, he filed a lawsuit against her, citing guardianship abuse and alleging that she misused $40,000.

In May 2023, Christopher was arrested on suspicion of public intoxication at the Hollywood Burbank Airport. Police responded to reports of a drunk male and arrived to find him sleeping on the ground near a terminal. He was arrested and fined.

== Death ==
On October 31, 2023, Christopher was found dead. His cause of death was revealed to be positional asphyxia due to acute alcohol intoxication. He was 50 years old.

== Filmography ==
Year	TV & Film	Role	Notes
1996–2016	General Hospital	Nikolas Cassadine; Connor Bishop	July 15, 1996 – July 14, 1999, April 21, 2003 – July 30, 2011, March 22, 2013, to June 16, 2016; October 26, 2004 – January 25, 2005
1999	Catfish in Black Bean Sauce	Michael	
2000	Face the Music	Dan	
2000	The Pretender	Ethan	2 episodes: "The Inner Sense" (part 1 & 2)
2000	Charmed	Anton	1 episode
2000	Angel	Bret Folger	1 episode
2000	Family Law	Neil Lumston	1 episode
2001	The Pretender 2001	Ethan	
2001	Days of Our Lives	Signore Christofero	1 episode
2001	Felicity	Clubgoer	1 episode
2001	Out of the Black	Cole Malby	
2001	Sam's Circus	Sgt. Samuel Van Handle	
2001	Special Unit 2	Det. David Scott	1 episode
2002	Frogmen Operation Stormbringer	Captain Rick Jeffries	
2002	The Division	Seaman Stan Bellows	1 episode
2002	JAG	GSGT Joe Akers	1 episode
2002	Boomtown	Holden McKay	1 episode
2002	CSI: Crime Scene Investigation	Billy Rattison	1 episode
2002	The Twilight Zone	Dr. Jay Ferguson	Episode: "One Night at Mercy"
2003	Crossing Jordan	Officer Fisher	1 episode
2005	Into the West	Jacob Wheeler Jr.	unknown episodes
2006	Secrets of a Small Town	Grant Wilson	Unaired television pilot
2009	Raven	Vlad	
2009	The New York City Kitties	Alexandar Vander Platt/Handsome Devil	
2011–2013	The Lying Game	Dan Whitehorse	Recurring role, 27 episodes
2014	Beyond the Lights	Liam King	
2017–2019	Days of Our Lives	Stefan DiMera	Series regular
2018	F.R.E.D.I.	Randy	
2023	Icestorm	Griffin	

== Awards and nominations ==
Year	Award	Category	Project	Result	Ref.
1997	Soap Opera Digest Award	Best Newcomer	General Hospital	Won	
1997	First Americans in the Arts	Outstanding Performer in a Television Series	General Hospital	Won	
1998	First Americans in the Arts	Outstanding Performer in a Television Series	General Hospital	Won	
1998	Daytime Emmy Award	Outstanding Younger Actor in a Drama Series	General Hospital	Nominated	
1998	TV Guide	12 Hottest Daytime Stars	General Hospital	Won	
2004	NAACP Image Award	Outstanding Actor in a Daytime Drama Series	General Hospital	Nominated	
2005	Daytime Emmy Award	Outstanding Supporting Actor in a Drama Series	General Hospital	Nominated	
2006	Daytime Emmy Award	Outstanding Supporting Actor in a Drama Series	General Hospital	Nominated	
2011	American Indian Film Institute	Best Supporting Actor in a Movie		Won	
2016	Daytime Emmy Award	Outstanding Lead Actor in a Drama Series	General Hospital	Won	
2019	Daytime Emmy Award	Outstanding Lead Actor in a Drama Series	Days of Our Lives	Nominated	

First	Nikolas Cassadine (role); 1996–99; 2003–16	Succeeded by Coltin Scott
Preceded by Coltin Scott	Nikolas Cassadine (role); 1996–99; 2003–16	Succeeded by Nick Stabile
