= Law & Order: Organized Crime season 3 =

Season of American television series

Law & Order: Organized Crime
- Season 3
- Promotional poster
- Showrunners: Bryan Goluboff; Sean Jablonski; David Graziano
- Starring: Christopher Meloni; Danielle Moné Truitt; Ainsley Seiger; Brent Antonello; Rick Gonzalez
- No. of episodes: 22

Release
- Original network: NBC
- Original release: September 22, 2022 – May 18, 2023

Season chronology
- ← Previous; Season 2 Next → Season 4

The third season of Law & Order: Organized Crime premiered on September 22, 2022, on NBC and consisted of 22 episodes. The season finale aired on May 18, 2023.

== Cast and characters ==
=== Main ===
- Christopher Meloni as Senior Detective Elliot Stabler
- Danielle Moné Truitt as Sergeant Ayanna Bell
- Ainsley Seiger as Detective Jet Slootmaekers
- Brent Antonello as Detective Jamie Whelan
- Rick Gonzalez as Detective Bobby Reyes

=== Recurring ===
- Christopher Cassarino as Vaughn Davis
- Kevin Corrigan as Vincent Bishop
- John Doman as Robert Silas
- Michael Drayer as Kenny Kyle
- Pooch Hall as Dante Scott
- Daniel Jenkins as Leonard Baker
- JR Lemon as Deputy Inspector Ray Thurman
- Janel Moloney as Deputy Inspector Lillian Goldfarb
- Wass Stevens as Dominic Russo
- Ayelet Zurer as Agent Tia Leonetti
- Allison Siko as Kathleen Stabler
- Nicky Torchia as Elliot "Eli" Stabler Jr.

=== Crossover stars from Law & Order: Special Victims Unit ===
- Mariska Hargitay as Captain Olivia Benson
- Kelli Giddish as Detective/Professor Amanda Rollins
- Octavio Pisano as Detective Joe Velasco
- Ice-T as Sergeant Fin Tutuola
- Peter Scanavino as Assistant District Attorney Dominick Carisi Jr.
- Molly Burnett as Detective Grace Muncy

=== Crossover stars from Law & Order ===
- Jeffrey Donovan as Detective Frank Cosgrove
- Mehcad Brooks as Detective Jalen Shaw
- Camryn Manheim as Lieutenant Kate Dixon

=== Special guest stars ===
- Camilla Belle as Pearl Serrano
- Gus Halper as Teddy Silas
- Ellen Burstyn as Bernadette Stabler

== Episodes ==
No. overall	No. in season	Title	Directed by	Written by	Original release date	Prod. code	U.S. viewers (millions)
31	1	"Gimme Shelter – Part One"	Jean de Segonzac	Rick Eid & Gwen Sigan	September 22, 2022	301	4.97
During the War in Ukraine, a teen girl's whole family is killed. She comes to New York, where she gets trafficked. She is running in the street with blood on her face when Frank Cosgrove finds her and she gets hit by a car. While he is leading EMTs to her, the perp kills her and gets away before Cosgrove can react. Cosgrove teams up with Jalen Shaw to work on the case. They find out that the girl was living with her aunt and was missing for two months. They also find out from the M.E. that saltwater was on her hands. They learn there was a yacht party going on at a local pier. They go to the owner of the yacht, who says he leases it out to people. They visit Olivia Benson, who gives them access to the cameras in the area. They find out that there was someone chasing the teen. When they go to visit the person, Mark Sirenko, Cosgrove threatens him. Cosgrove gets questioned by Elliot Stabler, as OCCB had been investigating Sirenko for organized crime ties. When they find out that Stabler has a CI in Sirenko's employ, Stabler refuses to get him involved, but then changes his mind after Cosgrove says that was not like the Stabler he'd heard about. Stabler's CI clones Sirenko's phone and almost gets killed in the process. Stabler has Benson try to find information on a woman they found on Sirenko's phone. SVU finds her location and Cosgrove and Stabler raid the house. They arrest the woman and find a fourteen year-old girl in a bedroom. Note : This episode begins a crossover event that continues on the Law & Order: Special Victims Unit season 24 premiere episode "Gimme Shelter Part 2" and concludes on the Law & Order season 22 premiere episode "Gimme Shelter Part 3".
32	2	"Everybody Knows the Dice Are Loaded"	John Polson	Bryan Goluboff	September 29, 2022	302	3.60
The wealthy and powerful Silas family has broken ground on New York's first casino, but someone threatens to delay construction: resident Henry Cole who refuses to leave his home. When Cole ends up dying from a fall over his apartment balcony, Stabler suspects foul play. The M.E. shows Stabler rat bites on Cole's leg. Stabler, Jet, and new OCCB detective Jamie Whelan investigate and learn the rats were not native to New York, but a species from Africa that have venomous bites. The man who purchased the rats from a black market dealer gets bitten himself. He escapes from his hospital bed, leading the detectives on a chase. While breaking in another detective, Bobby Reyes, Ayanna deals with her pending divorce from Denise, who still does not forgive her for arresting Congressman Kilbride.
33	3	"Catch Me if You Can"	Kate Woods	Michael Konyves & Juliet Lashinsky-Revene	October 6, 2022	303	3.00
Stabler and the task force question Silas and Serrano about Kenny Kyle, the person buying the rats. They deny knowing him. Meanwhile, Kyle finds a gun hidden in the woods. Two police officers show up and get shot by Kyle. Pearl hires a private investigator to spy on Teddy. The person who Kyle bought the rats from gets sent to the hospital after Kyle comes asking for antibiotics to combat rat bites. Stabler and Jamie visit a woman who Kyle had always visited if he was in a predicament, Dede Hayes. She says she has not seen him in a long time. Bell and Reyes go to the casino construction site where they find someone in the wall of the building who was bitten by the rats. Kyle takes cover in someone's house to care for the bites on his leg. Kyle calls Hayes, who lied to the detectives, and she goes to Kyle's location. Stabler and Jamie follow Hayes, but she fools them into thinking she is elsewhere while going to Kyle. Hayes tries to kill Kyle by hiring people, but all three of them get killed by Kyle. Kyle steals a car with a child inside, causing Ayanna and Reyes to go find him. Ayanna tricks Kyle into giving the baby to her while Reyes arrests him. Teddy finds out that Pearl hired a private investigator and pays them off. Stabler is infuriated when one of the cops who was shot by Kyle dies.
34	4	"Spirit in the Sky"	Simon Brand	Jorge Zamacona	October 13, 2022	304	3.12
At the construction site, a new worker falls and is taken to the hospital, leading to a dispute between Pearl and Bishop. Meanwhile, Kenny goes to Rikers and assaults one of the police officers there, resulting in a visit from Stabler. Reyes wants to go into Rikers to try and talk to Kenny, but Bell does not want him to do so. She later changes her mind. Because of the incident at the site, construction is halted. Reyes tries to get in with Kenny and later does when he takes a shank to the stomach in his stead. Bishop is out of town at a funeral with Russo when he hears about the construction incident. Pearl later takes over the whole operation. Bell wants Reyes out of Rikers, as she does not want to lose another asset like she did with Gina Cappelletti. Stabler later takes over as his reporting officer. Bishop and Russo are afraid Kenny is going to talk in prison. Stabler and Reyes manage a deal with Kenny, his testimony in exchange for going to a prison in Florida to be close to family. Stabler and the task force find a connection between Russo, Bishop, and Kenny. Stabler and Jamie chase Russo down to the JFK airport, where they get into a shootout and Russo dies. Silas and his father talk about the death of Russo and how Stabler is on their tail. Stabler still tries to talk sense into Teddy and Pearl, but they continue to refuse to cooperate. Stabler and Jamie later visit Bishop, who commits suicide in the bathtub at his family home. Kenny gets to go to Florida and thanks Reyes for helping him. Stabler tells Pearl to watch her back as Henry Cole's building gets demolished.
35	5	"Behind Blue Eyes"	John Polson	Barry O'Brien	October 27, 2022	305	3.18
Stabler gets called to testify against the Brotherhood in court. He later gets asked by Amanda Rollins to investigate the rape of two girls who were assaulted by people dressed as cops. Bell gets told by the Deputy Inspector that OCCB might get shut down. Stabler and the task force question a guy who was attacked by dirty cops, but he does not trust the detectives. At first, they think it might be a faction of the Brotherhood, but that turns out to be false. A kid named Dante gets out of prison and joins his friends Manny and Vaughn, who are revealed to be the group of fake cops. Dante later joins his friends and they pull off another heist later that night. When Vaughn tries to rape a girl at the house they're robbing, Dante reveals his name, which causes him to shoot the girl. Bell and Jamie find blood on a coffee table, revealed to be Manny's, and Jet and Jamie go into a nightclub to clone his phone. Rollins and Stabler are able to get confirmation from the daughter of the first rape that it is Manny. Jet finds out that they are planning another heist that night. Reyes comes back to the task force after testifying against the guy who shanked him. The task force then gets into a shootout with both real cops and the fake cops where in Dante gets shot and Manny is arrested for staying behind with Dante. Reyes reveals to Bell that he grew up in a foster home with Manny and Dante, but also that he was in a foster home with Vaughn.
36	6	"Blaze of Glory"	Anna Dokoza	Daniel "Koa" Beaty	November 3, 2022	306	2.93
The team raids Vaughn's house only for Vaughn to watch from a security camera and blow up a car outside of the house, feet away from the team. Reyes goes back to the hospital to talk to Dante, but he gives Reyes nothing to work with. The Deputy Inspector's office isn't able to help provide more resources for the team until later on. Stabler and Jamie talk to Manny's lawyer, but they're not looking to cut a deal with information. Reyes goes to his foster family home to find Leonard, but he escapes through a window as Reyes is talking to the kids downstairs. Vaughn's crew tries to shoot at two cops and one of them gets injured. Stabler and Jamie find out that Vaughn was in the Police Academy and they talk to his instructor. The instructor directs them to Paul Fink, a local hustler at a pool hall. Vaughn kills two more of his crew for not following his orders. Fink leads Stabler and Jamie to NYPD detective Nate Reynolds, who lies to the detectives that he does not talk to Vaughn. Stabler and Jamie follow Reynolds to a junkyard, where they see him putting guns in a dumpster. Reyes, still tracking Leonard, follows him to a house and confronts him. Leonard is able to tell Reyes and Bell that Vaughn is looking to go out "in a blaze of glory." Vaughn later shows up at the junkyard and gets into a shootout with Stabler and Jamie before he is subsequently arrested. Reyes goes to tell Dante the news, but finds out he has died. As Stabler and Bell celebrate with a toast, Stabler gets a call from Pearl Serrano saying she has information for him.
37	7	"All That Glitters"	Simón Brand	Josh Fagin & Candice Sanchez McFarlane	November 10, 2022	307	3.00
Jet and Jamie go undercover to take down a jewelry smuggling operation, using Detective Tia Leonetti as their courier. Tia is Stabler's former partner from when he was with the police in Rome. She came to New York to help take down Abramov, who is smuggling gold. Meanwhile, Abramov killed one of his people when he asked for more gold. Reyes goes undercover to talk to Abramov. He succeeds, but they decide to turn one of the girls in the smuggling operation instead. Meanwhile, Pearl Serrano gives Jamie information to help him take down Teddy Silas, leading them to the warehouse where Abramov keeps the gold, as well as the skull of one of his victims. Stabler and Tia are able to get information from a consulate member of Northern Africa where Abramov is transporting gold from. They all track Abramov to an airport when he tries to get away, but the task force is able to take him down. The NYPD is able to find more girls who were held hostage by Abramov's crew. Pearl tries to get Teddy to separate himself from the business.
38	8	"Whipping Post"	Sharon Lewis	Jorge Zamacona	November 17, 2022	308	3.49
Bell gets a visit from Lillian Goldfarb, who tells her that she is going to get promoted to Deputy Inspector, but Organized Crime has to shut down. Meanwhile, Stabler gets a call from Teddy who says that Pearl mysteriously fell the previous night and is in the hospital. The doctors do not know the reason as to what happened. Bell tells Stabler not to take the case, but he does not listen to her and takes it anyways. Stabler and Jamie go to the bar outside of which Pearl fell and find the security footage was erased. Robert Silas tells Teddy to remove Pearl from his assets. Stabler and Jamie visit a bartender who was drugging people at the bar that night. They later find out that he did not spike Pearl's drink. Jet notes that she was wearing a scarf when she left; they check the scarf and find it was laced with a drug. Meanwhile, Reyes and Jamie go to Teddy's apartment to do a forensics check for the drug, but he does not let them help. Stabler goes to see Tia before she leaves to get her help with the case. Stabler goes to the hospital to see Pearl, but she'd left the hospital with help from her sister Eva. They get information from her doorman that a man named Belucci brought in a scarf. Stabler and Tia go to arrest Belucci and are able to catch him when he runs. They interrogate him, but his lawyer comes in, the same one who represents Silas. Elliot and Tia go see Robert and Teddy Silas to ask them questions, and Robert shuts it down by threatening Elliot with making calls to 1PP (One Police Plaza). While driving back to the precinct, Elliot drops Tia off at the airport and heads back to Italy and says goodbye to Stabler. Silas finds out about the lawyer and beats up Belucci with a bat in front of Stabler, Reyes, and Jamie. Stabler talks to Teddy about what Belucci said in the ambulance, that Robert Silas was the one who ordered the hit on Pearl Serrano. He tells Stabler that Pearl is pregnant. Stabler tries to find Robert, but he has fled his apartment. Finally, Bell tells Stabler that OCCB is shutting down and he gets mad, saying that his "heart and soul are in this unit."
39	9	"Last Christmas"	Jean de Segonzac	Sean Jablonski	December 8, 2022	309	3.28
Robert Silas' attorney comes to the task force to talk about making a deal. Stabler and Bell meet Robert in a neutral location to discuss the deal while Jet, Jamie, and Reyes are en route. The location has no service to get in contact with anyone. While discussing the deal, a fake DA shows up after Bell tells him where to go. She finds out he is fake when the real DA shows up to negotiate. The task force gets into a shootout with the fake ADA where Stabler winds up shooting him from the window. When Stabler, Reyes, and Jamie go to check the body, they get ambushed by members of the Russo crime family. Jamie gets shot and winds up in another part of the building, but Stabler manages to find him. The task force gets out of the building thanks to throwing Reyes' cell phone off the roof to get a signal. Bell tells Lillian that she is not taking the new job at 1PP and cleanses the whole office with sage.
40	10	"Trap"	John Polson	Emmy Higgins	January 5, 2023	310	3.79
An informant named Tino rams into the back of a police car, while his wife gets kidnapped by a group of street racers. Stabler winds up seeing a psychiatrist after the incident at Robert Silas' warehouse, but leaves when he gets a call from Tino asking for help finding his girlfriend. Bell meets with the new Deputy Inspector, who respects her for denying the position. Stabler and Reyes meet up with a friend of Stabler's up in the Bronx who refuses to give information on the street racers. The task force finds out it is run by a woman named Menendez who runs street cars down in Miami. Stabler and Reyes arrest one of their drivers after they find the wife's earpods in the back of his car. Since he used to race stock cars, Jamie goes undercover to become the new driver in Menendez's group, which he does by earning the respect of a man named Ruiz. The location Jamie goes is where Tino's wife is and the task force takes down some of the group while Menendez, Ruiz, and Jamie leave in another car. Reyes and Jet chase the car, but Jamie outmaneuvers them.
41	11	"The Infiltration Game"	Stephen Surjik	Alec Wells	January 12, 2023	311	3.39
Jamie drives Ruiz and Menendez to where the true leader of the organization is, Antonio Duran. Duran immediately kicks Jamie out, causing Stabler to take over the undercover operation. They stage Jamie's death, which infuriates him as he wanted to do the job. Thurman brings in two detectives from Miami to help the task force take down Duran's drug-running operation. Stabler is able to get a position in Duran's group because of the staged video. Duran later has Menendez keep an eye on Stabler to see what he is all about. Stabler later finds out that there was a shooting near his friend's bodega that he visited earlier and comforts the owner. Stabler needs more money for Duran's deal. When he goes back to the bar, he finds that Ruiz has been shot. As he tries to get Ruiz to safety, the two Miami detectives raid the bar and kill Ruiz. Stabler and Jamie get into an argument, as Jamie is keeping the Miami detectives from knowing anything about the case. Bell feels there is something off about Thurman and does some investigating, finding out he has an alias. Looking back at Ruiz's GPS, they are able to find his hideout and arrest Menendez. Menendez leads the task force to Duran. When she finds that she was lied to the whole time, she kills Duran and gets arrested by the task force. Stabler apologizes to Jamie about the interrogation from earlier.
42	12	"Partners in Crime"	Tess Malone	Teleplay by : Barry O'Brien; Story by : Barry O'Brien & John A. McCormack	January 26, 2023	312	4.16
At the arraignment of Octavio Montanero, Montanero lashes out in court saying that Eamon Murphy killed Bell's former partner, not him. This causes Bell to investigate what happened years ago. She finds out that the weapon that killed her partner did not match the slug that was found. Murphy hears about what happened at the arraignment and asks his second-in-hand Seamus O'Meara to handle it. Montanero later gets killed in jail. Thurman tells Bell to be careful about what she is doing with the case. Stabler asks for help from Teddy Silas, using one of his bars for a sting operation to take down Murphy in exchange for a lighter sentence. The task force sets up the bar as a casino to make it look legit so they can open it for business. Reyes goes to visit a relative of his to ask for help in taking down the New Westies. O'Meara and Murphy visit Montanero's wife and threaten her with Murphy's killer dog. DA Rika Harold shows up to have Stabler provide information on the New Westies. Bell receives a visit from her former partner's wife to get support in the case, but finds she is leaving all of that behind. When Reyes and Jet take Teddy to the bar, they see a loaded gun in his bag and confiscate it. At the casino, Jet is able to get in with O'Meara and the two start a relationship. Reyes and Jamie take down a bust with the rest of O'Meara's gang. Stabler and Bell tell Jet that she is doing a good job undercover. Jet later bumps into O'Meara out on the street and meets Murphy. Rika calls Stabler and says Montanero's case is closed, as his death is being ruled a suicide.
43	13	"Punch Drunk"	Brenna Malloy	Juliet Lashinsky-Revene	February 2, 2023	313	3.65
Jet takes big steps in her relationship with O'Meara. A fight erupts at the bar with O'Meara and another group, later revealed to be people that Rika hired to help Stabler. Murphy visits the bar and asks Stabler to make him a partner, to which Stabler gives him 25% and has to show up to the bar regularly. O'Meara and Jet go to a heliport where they see Murphy bringing in an Irish boxing champ. Murphy is shown wearing the police academy ring of Bell's former partner on his finger. Bell later visits Thurman, as he is trying to keep her from further investigating, but she tells him no one is going to stop her from finishing the case. Jamie and Reyes try to get Gustavo, one of the people who got busted previously, to go back out and buy more drugs so they'll have a better case. Jet believes there is a contract out on O'Meara if he does not follow through with certain orders. Gustavo bails out of the operation and Stabler has to go in and set up another bar, as Murphy is mad. O'Meara and Jet up the ante on their relationship. Reyes takes photos of this and shows Bell, causing Bell to deliberate whether to take Jet out of the operation or not. Teddy and Murphy set up a boxing match at the bar. Jet is mad at Reyes for taking the photos of her and O'Meara. Jet puts on an act in front of Bell to show that she is ready to take the job. The boxing match goes well until Michael Amato comes in and shoots the place up. O'Meara and Jet run out, but Jet's wig gets pulled off and her cover is blown. O'Meara knocks her out and places her in the trunk of his car while Bell is listening on the phone.
44	14	"All in the Game"	Oz Scott	Michael Konyves	February 16, 2023	314	3.45
Amato watches Jet get kidnapped by O'Meara and then gets kidnapped himself by Murphy moments later. Teddy holds a cop hostage and escapes after being told by the task force not to get in the way. Stabler questions Murphy about where O'Meara is. Murphy has an idea as to where he may be. O'Meara takes Jet into the woods to kill her. Jet manages to escape and the task force takes O'Meara into custody after Stabler shoots him. Murphy finds out from Amato that OCCB was running the bar and later kills Amato with his dog. Bell and Stabler find out that Teddy escaped from Thurman while comforting Jet at the hospital. Teddy gets help from a friend and calls Murphy to get him out. Jamie and Reyes miss him by a second as Teddy gets away. Meanwhile, Stabler, Jet, and Bell find the pen gun that killed Bell's former partner in O'Meara's place. Stabler asks O'Meara about the pen gun they found while Jamie and Reyes question the car shop owner about aiding Teddy's escape. Teddy is about to get killed by Murphy's dog, but the task force arrives before it escalates. Bell questions Murphy about her former partner. Jet visits O'Meara before he goes to jail for his actions. Bell later finds out that Murphy is an FBI informant, so their investigation is thrown out. Bell meets Murphy at his warehouse and almost kills him, but is stopped by Stabler. O'Meara is killed in his hospital bed on the orders of Murphy, upsetting Jet. Stabler threatens Murphy, telling him to watch his back.
45	15	"The Wild and the Innocent"	Alex Zakrzewski	Jorge Zamacona	February 23, 2023	315	3.65
Stabler attempts to prevent a gang war when Janelle Carver, the daughter of David Carver, leader of the "Sons of Sin" motorcycle club and also Stabler's old platoon leader in the Marines, is abducted and her fiancé murdered by members of "The Cursed Crew," a rival gang lead by Peter Grimes who has close connections with the Los Toros cartel. The task force uses a prospect to find a weapons cache also being tracked by the ATF. They inform Stabler that kidnapping is usually done by cartels, not motorcycle gangs, leading Stabler to find that Carver was selling guns to Grimes, who then gave them to the cartel. Carver pulled out of the deal when he found out the cartel were killing Marines, but he is unable to give the name of the supplier who 3-D prints them. Tracing polymer sales with 3-D printers, Bell and Slootmaekers find the manufacturer Julius Hays and make him a deal. Stabler gets David leniency on his weapons dealing. Marco of Los Toros puts the pressure on Grimes, who promises him all the guns he'll ever need. Grimes changes the deal and threatens an undercover Stabler with footage of Janelle. As Julius was a ghost manufacturer, Whelan decides to go to the deal undercover as Hays, selling guns that do not shoot. The deal begins to go wrong when Los Toros shows up with the intent of taking "Hays" after a Sons of Sin member informs on the deal and a firefight ensues. Grimes drives off with Janelle, but the task force catches up to and arrests him.
46	16	"Chinatown"	Milena Govich	Josh Fagin & Candice Sanchez McFarlane	March 23, 2023	316	3.24
Deputy Inspector Ray Thurman calls the task force after an assassination attempt on Stephen Lee, a candidate for Chinatown councilman. Lee's wife Jennifer is hit and taken to the hospital. Detective Chang, 4th Precinct, Community Affairs attempts to push OCCB off the case. Lee was receiving threats from gangs and informed the 4th Precinct, but refuses a security detail until Stabler persuades him otherwise. The investigation leads to Daniel Yao, a worker who ran during the attempt. Stabler and Bell meet with Captain Lin at the 4th Precinct, who is likewise uncooperative. Yao identifies the assassin as Yeung, a member of the Doyers Street Gang, the biggest in Chinatown, but Chang arrives to inform Stabler and Bell that he is lying, as Yeung is her CI in the gang and was with her during the shooting. They set Yao loose and he meets with Yuze Zhao, a high ranking member in the Black Tiger Gang. Stabler meets with Michael Quan, Lee's campaign advisor who replaced Stabler's assigned detail with his own private security, and the situation gets more chaotic when someone puts out a reward for whoever shot Lee's wife. Zhao takes Yao to Kai, the leader of Doyers Street, to explain Yao's actions and turn him over to be killed before the task force moves in. While they fail to apprehend Kai, they manage to arrest Zhao. Detective Chang brings in Lily, a previous slave the Black Tigers used until she got pregnant, who now works in Chinatown community medical thanks to Jennifer Lee. Because she helped so many women the Black Tigers were trafficking, Jennifer turns out to be the actual target. In light of this truth, Stephen Lee decides to drop out of the race. Jennifer was attempting to help Mei Shen, who disappeared a month after an incident at the bank where she worked. After checking Jennifer's cell phone, they track Shen to an address in Queens and find her body. Captain Lin makes a move on the Black Tigers and raids their hideout, putting an ID on Zhao as the shooter, unlikely as Shen was killed around the time Zhao was in custody. Jennifer Lee wakes up in the hospital and tells them that Shen was supposed to have received shelter from Michael Quan. Slootmaekers reports that Lee's campaign was being funded by a banking group in China where Quan was on the board of directors. Stabler promises that Quan will go down for the assassination attempt.
47	17	"Blood Ties"	Jonathan Brown	Alec Wells	March 30, 2023	317	2.88
Detective Chang works with the task force to help them take down Michael Quan, who is now running for city council. In order to fight his smuggling and human trafficking operation, they stake out his ship "The Blue Siren" to intercept a supposed slave shipment, but only find Wen Shao, a frantic father in search of his 16 year old son Bo, all the way from China. A wayward life raft shows signs that the slaves may have been moved before the ship made port. They, along with Bo, are taken by Kai and the Doyers Street Gang. The task force finds an abandoned Excelsior truck with secret messages from the 12 slaves asking for help. Quan has Kai kill a coast guard officer who covered for him at the docks. Bell and Chang head to Sister Shu, a contact of Chang's, to ask who handled the Blue Siren shipment. While it seems they are stonewalled, Chang is confident that Shu will ask around so her CIs will inform. Stabler is taken by Shao to Bill Huang, Shao's contact. He forges passports for the gangs and gives Stabler an address Whelan and Reyes have already located. Shao rushes into the building and Stabler runs after him, but Bo is not there. Captain Lin is informed of Quan's dealings and Quan denies everything. The Doyers are identified as the gang holding the slaves and Stabler sets up Shao to "buy" his son back. Shao identifies Bo to the seller, but he claims Bo cannot be bought because he is "special" and invites Shao to an auction where Bo is being sold. Quan offers a 2 million dollar donation to the NYPD for a new task force against human trafficking to get the heat off himself and potentially shut down the OCCB. Shao goes into the auction as the task force's access to the building. Quan is present at the club where the auction is being held and recognizes Shao from a photo given to him by Kai, whom he instructs to move out everything. The police move in after Shao lets them know the auction is being held there. Whelen and Reyes arrest Kai before he relocates Bo and the slaves and Stabler arrests Quan. After recent events, Stabler chooses to spend the rest of his day with Eli.
48	18	"Tag:GEN"	John Polson	Nick Culbertson	April 6, 2023	318	3.29
Whelan and Reyes go undercover at a gay club looking for Paolo Costa, a drug dealer from Rio. During the bust, someone collapses at the club and Paolo is beaten before he is arrested by an unidentified male. The man who collapsed is identified as a Eric Geary, a policeman. He is taken to the hospital and, once stabilized, states that he was drugged with GHB. Costa lawyers up during interrogation about the drugs and who he is selling them to. The task force works to find the man who assaulted Costa. Bell and Slootmaekers track him down and arrest him. He states that he was fighting back against someone targeting gay men at the club, drugging them and robbing their bank accounts. Chang is brought in on the case and tells them about a shoeprint on a victim's back; further investigation finds that the victims were attacked at five clubs owned by Robert Petrillo, a RICO suspect. Stabler and Bell question him about his connections and Petrillo denies involvement. Bell is called in when someone is killed by GHB overdose. A neighbor informs her of someone the victim was seeing. Geary reports to Bell of a watch that went missing while he was at the club. The task force checks a pawn shop to obtain footage of the thief, who they find and arrest. He lawyers up despite confessing to being part of a crew and a poster is found on him promoting a circuit party event. Petrillo goes to his son Alex, questioning him about the attacks at the clubs, but Alex is more concerned with his father's debts. Geary is brought in to assist Stabler, who is going undercover. At the club, they find "Ben," a spotter for the thieves, and Alex Petrillo, who attempts to drug Stabler. The task force moves in and arrests Alex, matching his boot to the victim in the photo. Alex had been robbing the victims to pay off Frank Moretti, a mob boss to whom his father Robert owes money. To help them track down Moretti, they make a deal with Alex, who drives them to a location where Robert is being blackmailed by Moretti into giving him the clubs. Alex finds that Robert has been laundering money for the mob. Moretti is caught and arrested after shooting at Robert.
49	19	"A Diplomatic Solution"	Jon Cassar	Christina Piña	April 27, 2023	319	3.24
Chief Novak of NYPD Counter Intelligence arrives during a UN assembly to provide high profile transport to an External Affairs Minister named Diya Laghari from Delhi. She is called upon to give a speech that may turn the tide in the Ukraine War. Stabler takes personal charge of Madam Laghari and her briefcase before the escort is attacked by remote car bombing; Laghari's personal assistant, Sita, is injured. Soon, Laghari is delivered to the Consulate and Stabler meets her head of security, Veer. Whelan and Reyes investigate the sewers and are later cornered by under-dwellers who point them to a suspect. Slootmaekers runs facial recognition on the suspect and Bernadette identifies the suspect as Russian by the brand of cigarettes he has. Vikram Patel, Madam Lagari's original driver who was not present during the bombing, is found in his house, shot in the head. Though Patel sold information on the drive route, Laghari subtlety implicates Veer as a suspect. Reyes visits a friend of his concerning the cigarettes and discovers someone named Ivan Ostrowski, former Russian Militia, set off the bomb. The task force raids his house and finds evidence identifying him as the bomber before arresting him. They find a hit list which includes Patel, Laghari, and a Leland Johnson who stole semiconductors from a military factory that are used in various government weapons. Johnson is found after Veer picks up his drop and the task force arrests him. The Consulate is then raided and searched; Veer is arrested for illegal arms trading, but Laghari was the one who attempted to leave the country with the conductors. A cover story is put in place as a diplomatic solution to let her return to India empty-handed.
50	20	"Pareto Principle"	Gonzalo Amat	David Graziano & Brendan Feeney	May 4, 2023	320	3.08
On Staten Island, Agent Curtis McCrary of the FBI calls in the task force when Phil McBride's head is discovered decapitated in his clothes dryer by his wife. It is found that he was part of a crew of bank robbers, probably linked to heists in Union Square worth over 2 million dollars. Another of the crew, Frank Little, was shot the previous morning. They're linked by their jobs at a Crypto exchange. The investigation leads them to Lloyd Bloom who is living with Phil's sister in Rosebank, working as a lineman for Con-Electric. He is taken in for questioning after being found taking duffel bags he stashed with $1 million inside. He claims that McBride gave him the bag to keep safe. Finding the murder weapon links Bloom to Little's murder, but not directly to McBride's murder. The DNA of Junior Suarez found at McBride's murder scene implicates him, though on the night of the murder he was supposed to be in prison. He had frequent visits from his twin sister Tiffany, so Reyes goes to question her and finds that Suarez gave her twenty-five thousand dollars recently. Suarez's relative is also a lineman like Lloyd. A prison guard Mike Pendergast becomes a suspect when he is linked to many bogus furloughs from prison. Pendergast is later arrested in a sting, but not before attempting to send a signal. Pendergast only ever paid his furlough hitmen in cigarettes, revealing that Suarez was taking side jobs for money. His DNA is found at another crime scene, an indication of something larger than prison hitmen. After considerable stress, Stabler hallucinates his wife in the interrogation room.
51	21	"Shadowërk"	Tess Malone	Teleplay by : Brendan Feeney & Candice Sanchez McFarlane; Story by : David Graziano	May 11, 2023	321	3.48
The Special Victims Unit is called in to cooperate when Junior Suarez is linked to a rape for hire case they are working. Benson and Stabler go to Greenhaven to check Suarez's cell and find a phone. While there, Benson has an uncomfortable reunion with Oscar Papa, the leader of BX9. Sergeant Bell later interviews Maria Varga and identifies Juarez as her attacker. Slootmaekers finds he was paid in bitcoin and got the job online. Whelan and Reyes are tasked with checking the computer of Derek Scully, Varga's previous employer, but discover it was his wife who hired Juarez from a website called "Shadowërk," a kickstarter for the depraved. On the site, they find the selfies of rapes committed, along with a list of other requests for violent crime. They find nine users who wanted Rachel Lee Sprague murdered and Stabler has them arrested. They question her next door neighbor, who reveals he put $500 down on a crowdfunding for Sprague's murder. Further looking at Shadowërk's site uncovers the site works worldwide, with taken jobs marked by katana symbols. Shortly, a hit is put out for Gary Longo, a bookie, and Stabler and Whelan rush to the Bronx to stop the job. They prepare a sting on his apartment and a suspicious Core Global delivery truck driver "Josh Crocklen" approaches with a gun and is arrested. He reveals that everything goes through someone named Hyakunin Giri who receives the selfies. Once Hyakunin Giri's IP is traced to Dublin, Ohio, McCrary is put on the investigation. After sending a fake selfie for Longo's "hit," Crocklen gets paid 2000 dollar. Stabler goes to Rollins and she profiles someone who feels powerless in his own life. McCrary returns when Shadowërk puts out a hit on Barbara Zeigler, a Federal judge who is later found murdered. Note : This episode continues a crossover event that begins on Law & Order: Special Victims Unit Season 24 Episode 21 "Bad Things", continues on Law & Order: Special Victims Unit Season 24 Episode 22 "All Pain Is One Malady", and concludes on Law & Order: Organized Crime Season 3 Episode 22 "With Many Names.
52	22	"With Many Names"	John Polson	Teleplay by : Julie Martin & Nicholas Evangelista; Story by : David Graziano	May 18, 2023	322	4.00
Shadowërk puts a bounty on Oliva Benson and Elliot Stabler worth $50,000. Jacob Bettencourt, an IT worker in association with Shadowërk, is questioned by Whelan and Reyes. In response to the bounty, the Feds take Benson and Stabler off active duty. Linda Wilkie is questioned and investigating her leads to her son, Kyle, who was coding at summer camp the past five years. The police and FBI raid the Wilkie home, but Kyle is not there. Benson and Stabler are attacked at a diner and, after Benson is shot, she kills the perp. Linda Wilkie gets a lawyer before she is questioned by Sergeants Bell and Finn. She refuses to give him up until Rollins speaks with her about a suicide note he left on Christmas. They locate him at the currently closed summer camp and find the selfies on his cabin wall. Unfortunately, Kyle shoots Whelan in the neck. Wilkie stabs himself after seeing Stabler. This forces the medics to prioritize saving Kyle over Whelan. Wilkie is taken to prison hospital. Kyle is forced to shut down Shadowërk when his mother is brought up on charges and extradited from Ohio. Whelan is paralyzed when he comes out of surgery and his visiting father takes him off life support. Wilkie goes to prison for life. Note : This episode concludes a crossover event that begins on Law & Order: Special Victims Unit Season 24 Episode 21 "Bad Things", and continues on Law & Order: Special Victims Unit Season 24 Episode 22 "All Pain Is One Malady" and Law & Order: Organized Crime Season 3 Episode 22 "With Many Names.

== Ratings ==
Viewership and ratings per episode of Law & Order: Organized Crime season 3
No.	Title	Air date	Rating (18–49)	Viewers (millions)	DVR (18–49)	DVR viewers (millions)	Total (18–49)	Total viewers (millions)
1	"Gimme Shelter – Part One"	September 22, 2022	0.6	4.97	—N/a	—N/a	—N/a	—N/a
2	"Everybody Knows the Dice Are Loaded"	September 29, 2022	0.5	3.60	—N/a	—N/a	—N/a	—N/a
3	"Catch Me if You Can"	October 6, 2022	0.4	3.00	—N/a	—N/a	—N/a	—N/a
4	"Spirit in the Sky"	October 13, 2022	0.5	3.12	—N/a	—N/a	—N/a	—N/a
5	"Behind Blue Eyes"	October 27, 2022	0.5	3.18	—N/a	—N/a	—N/a	—N/a
6	"Blaze of Glory"	November 3, 2022	0.4	2.93	—N/a	—N/a	—N/a	—N/a
7	"High Planes Grifter"	November 10, 2022	0.4	3.00	—N/a	—N/a	—N/a	—N/a
8	"Whipping Post"	November 17, 2022	0.4	3.49	—N/a	—N/a	—N/a	—N/a
9	"Last Christmas"	December 8, 2022	0.4	3.28	—N/a	—N/a	—N/a	—N/a
10	"Trap"	January 5, 2023	0.5	3.79	—N/a	—N/a	—N/a	—N/a
11	"The Infiltration Game"	January 12, 2023	0.5	3.39	—N/a	—N/a	—N/a	—N/a
12	"Partners in Crime"	January 26, 2023	0.5	4.16	—N/a	—N/a	—N/a	—N/a
13	"Punch Drunk"	February 2, 2023	0.5	3.65	—N/a	—N/a	—N/a	—N/a
14	"All in the Game"	February 16, 2023	0.5	3.45	—N/a	—N/a	—N/a	—N/a
15	"The Wild and the Innocent"	February 23, 2023	0.5	3.65	—N/a	—N/a	—N/a	—N/a
16	"Chinatown"	March 23, 2023	0.4	3.24	—N/a	—N/a	—N/a	—N/a
17	"Blood Ties"	March 30, 2023	0.4	2.88	—N/a	—N/a	—N/a	—N/a
18	"Tag:GEN"	April 6, 2023	0.4	3.29	—N/a	—N/a	—N/a	—N/a
19	"A Diplomatic Solution"	April 27, 2023	0.3	3.24	—N/a	—N/a	—N/a	—N/a
20	"Pareto Principle"	May 4, 2023	0.3	3.08	—N/a	—N/a	—N/a	—N/a
21	"Shadowërk"	May 11, 2023	0.4	3.48	—N/a	—N/a	—N/a	—N/a
22	"With Many Names"	May 18, 2023	0.4	4.00	—N/a	—N/a	—N/a	—N/a
