= Orbitel =

Orbitel may refer to:

- Orbitel (Bulgarian company), a wireline telecommunications and Internet service provider with national licences for voice and data
- Orbitel (Colombian company), the international business unit of UNE EPM Telecomunicaciones
- Orbitel (British company), maker of the Orbitel 901, the first phone to receive an SMS text message, in 1992
