= Mónica Fonseca =

Colombian-American television presenter, journalist and blogger

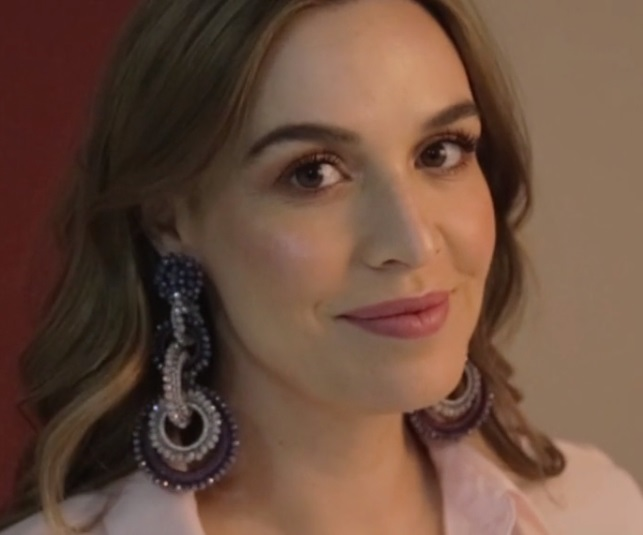
- Born: June 10, 1982 (age 44); Miami, Florida, U.S.
- Occupations: Journalist, TV Presenter
- Spouses: Mark Tacher (m. 2009; div. 2011) Juan Pablo Raba (m. 2011)
- Children: 2

Mónica Patricia Fonseca Delgadillo (born June 10, 1982) is a Colombian-American television presenter, journalist and blogger who was born in Miami, Florida. She is a United Nations Environmental Ambassador, an Audi ambassador and spokesperson, and an ING Financial Partners affiliate for their "Helping to Build Wealth" program.

She works as a talent for CNET Networks and has her own feature segment on the Univision show "¡Despierta América!" called "Las Mujeres También Hablamos de Tecnología" (We Women Also Talk About Technology), where she talks and presents the latest gadgets and apps used in daily life.

She's also co-host in the original production of V-me, Show Business Extra which is broadcast in the United States for the Hispanic audience.

A talent working for LatinWE, she is the co-founder of the online beauty platform Fancybox, and also founder and spokesperson for Instafit.

Nowadays she is a Huggies Mom, a spokesperson for Rowenta Beauty Tools, an "it girl" for Arkitect by Pinkfilosofy, and a spokesperson for the breast cancer awareness campaign #ÚneteALaLucha by Chocolyne along with the photographer Andrés Oyuela and designer Mónica Holguín.

== Early life and career ==
Mónica Fonseca began her career when she was just a child, along with her father Carlos Fonseca Zárate, an environmentalist/civil engineer and economist who was the Deputy Minister of Environment for Colombia. Always inspired to follow in her father's footsteps, she worked as his assistant in several environmental projects, congresses and conferences. Fonseca began her Political Science studies at the Universidad De Los Andes and then she traveled to Maryland, United States, where she continued her studies and worked in an NGO called Environmental Solutions where she was in charge of creating the Spanish digital edition of the encyclopedia of Marine Areas of the Caribbean.

Along with her friends, she produced fashion shows at age 15 and that is how she began modeling. Her first television appearance was for CityTV as a guest host of RadioCity where she covered fashion events for the network. From 2001, she worked as a presenter for CityTV in the programs Citynoticias (she presented the entertainment section), RadioCity and CityCápsula.

== Trajectory ==
In 2004, she started working at Caracol Radio and participated in various broadcasts for the network, among them Los 40 Principales, in which she was part of the morning program A Despertar. She received the Shock award for best commercial radio voice that same year by public polling.

Later on, she was part of the staff for the show La Ventana for Caracol Radio. In 2005, Fonseca left City TV to present the show Hola Escola broadcast on Canal Uno along with the Argentinian presenter, director and musician César Escola. The show received an India Catalina award.

In the second trimester of 2005, Fonseca joined Canal Caracol, presenting the humor show "También Caerás" (You will fall for it, too) along with the singer, presenter and actor Moisés Angulo. In October of that year, Fonseca replaced the presenter and singer Adriana Tono in the entertainment section of the news broadcast Caracol Noticias.

She made special coverage of beauty contests and fairs in Colombia and was nominated by TV y Novelas magazine as best entertainment presenter for her work at Caracol Noticias.

Fonseca presented a show on the Discovery Travel & Living channel in which she traveled to different places in Latin America and introduced viewers to the diverse lifestyles, travels, boutique hotels, spas and luxury hotels of these places.

In 2006, Fonseca left "La Ventana" to be part of the staff of the show with the highest number of listeners in the afternoon, "La Hora Del Regreso," on W Radio, directed by Julio Sánchez Cristo.

In February 2007, news director Álvaro García hired her to present the morning edition of Noticias RCN, where, at the same time, Fonseca proposed to create a dedicated space for technology; that is how the section called Mundo Digital was created, which she directed and presented for six years.

That year, she was the TV host for the program 13 Pasos for the Cosmopolitan channel, where she began a relationship with the Mexican actor Mark Tacher; they were married 2010 and divorced in 2011.

In 2008, Claudia Gurisatti invited Fonseca to become part of the on-air talent for NTN24 and to have a 30 minute section created and directed by Fonseca entitled Ciencia, Salud y Tecnología (Science, Health and Technology) until 2013. This section was recognized and awarded by the experts in the said fields and she co-hosted Planeta Gente, obtaining an India Catalina award.

In 2011, she was in a show called Los Originales produced by the broadcasting station La X of the Radial Todelar network along with Jaime Sánchez Cristo and his crew.

That same year, she was a special guest jury member for Project Runway Latin America for the Glitz* channel.

In August 2011, she married actor and producer Juan Pablo Raba in a private ceremony in Miami, United States; they have a son Joaquín Raba Fonseca, who was born July 19, 2012.

In addition to being a presenter and host for special events, Fonseca has been spokesperson for several brands such as Huggies, Mother Care, Pepa Pombo, Amelia Toro, Pink Filosofy, Apple, Almacenes Éxito, UNE, Pantene, Loreal, Despegar.com, BlackBerry, Seven-Seven Belier, Rowenta, Listerine, the Ministry of Labor and Adriana Arango.

== Awards and recognition ==
- Infashion Magazine Awards
- Cartagena International Music Festival
- TvyNovelas awards (different nominations and categories)
- Mapa del Poder Revista Semana, Most Influential People In Digital Media of Colombia
