= Law & Order: Special Victims Unit season 24 =

Season of American television series

Law & Order: Special Victims Unit
- Season 24
- Season 24 U.S. DVD cover
- Starring: Mariska Hargitay; Kelli Giddish; Ice-T; Peter Scanavino; Octavio Pisano; Molly Burnett
- No. of episodes: 22

Release
- Original network: NBC
- Original release: September 22, 2022 – May 18, 2023

Season chronology
- ← Previous; Season 23 Next → Season 25

The twenty-fourth season of the American crime-drama television series Law & Order: Special Victims Unit was ordered on February 27, 2020, by NBC, which premiered on September 22, 2022, with a crossover premiere event, the season contained 22 episodes, and concluded on May 18, 2023. The season was produced by Wolf Entertainment and Universal Television; the new showrunner is David Graziano replacing Warren Leight. Molly Burnett was announced to join the cast on July 24. Burnett left the main cast after the season finale. On August 24, Kelli Giddish confirmed she would be leaving midway through the season.

== Cast ==
=== Main ===
- Mariska Hargitay as Captain Olivia Benson
- Kelli Giddish as Senior Detective Amanda Rollins (episodes 1–9, special guest star episode 22)
- Ice-T as Sergeant Odafin "Fin" Tutuola
- Peter Scanavino as Assistant District Attorney Dominick "Sonny" Carisi, Jr.
- Octavio Pisano as Junior Detective Joe Velasco
- Molly Burnett as Junior Detective Grace Muncy (episodes 7–22, recurring episodes 2–6)

=== Crossover stars ===
==== Law & Order ====
- Mehcad Brooks as Junior Detective Jalen Shaw
- Jeffrey Donovan as Senior Detective Frank Cosgrove
- Camryn Manheim as Lieutenant Kate Dixon

==== Law & Order: Organized Crime ====
- Christopher Meloni as Senior Detective Elliot Stabler
- Brent Antonello as Detective Jamie Whelan
- Rick Gonzalez as Detective Bobby Reyes
- Ainsley Seiger as Junior Detective Jet Slootmaekers
- Danielle Moné Truitt as Sergeant Ayanna Bell

=== Recurring ===
- Adrian Alvarado as Detective Ray Fernandez
- Erin Anderson as Attorney April Andrews
- Jasmine Batchelor as Detective Tonie Churlish
- Anjali Bhimani as Nisha Singh
- Stephen C. Bradbury as Judge Colin McNamara
- Betty Buckley as Trial Division Chief Assistant District Attorney Lorraine Maxwell
- Ryan Buggle as Noah Porter-Benson
- Charlotte Cabell as Jesse Murphy Rollins
- Maurice Compte as Captain Mike Duarte
- Rigo Garay as Hector Suárez
- Rock Kohli as Rav Singh
- Kevin Kane as Detective Terry Bruno
- J.C MacKenzie as Attorney Richard Pace
- Beatrice Mallow as Billie Rollins
- Quentin Nguyen-Duy as Officer Eric Tran
- Suzana Norberg as Rose Bergman
- Anthony Patellis as Judge Lonnie Dukakis
- Adam Petchel as Elias Olsen
- Kadia Saraf as US Attorney Anya Avital
- Terry Serpico as Chief Tommy McGrath
- Frances Turner as Attorney Elaine Samuels
- Aida Turturro as Judge Felicia Catano
- Robbie Williams as Mason Carter
- Frank Wood as Medical Examiner Abel Truman
- Aditi Yadav as Priya Singh

=== Notable guests ===
- Jordan Belfi as Spencer Lewis
- Anna Belknap as Ginny McCann
- Brooke Bloom as Maggie D'Angelo
- James Carpinello as Paul Greco
- Lola Glaudini as Lena Hess
- Dave Shalansky as Ethan Schmidt
- Nancy Travis as Winifred "Winnie" Olsen
- Nia Vardalos as Defense Attorney Minnona Efron
- Dana Wheeler-Nicholson as Lilah Jones
- Bradley Whitford as Pence Humphreys

== Episodes ==
Law & Order: Special Victims Unit season 24 episodes
No. overall	No. in season	Title	Directed by	Written by	Original release date	Prod. code	U.S. viewers (millions)
517	1	"Gimme Shelter – Part Two"	Jean de Segonzac	Rick Eid & Gwen Sigan	September 22, 2022	2403	5.47
Benson and Fin question the girl they found in the house, while Cosgrove and Shaw pressure the woman. They all raid Sirenko's house where Stabler, Benson, and Cosgrove all find makings of a bomb in a secret room. They try contending with the FBI and the Deputy Mayor, who don't budge because they don't want to evacuate 9 million people from the city. Stabler has his CI get in contact with Sirenko to find out about the bomb, but it leads to a shootout and Stabler's CI dead. Stabler questions Sirenko's bodyguard, but he is not talking. Stabler also heats things up with the Deputy Mayor after he talks about his CI. Jet finds out about a house that is being rented. The guy works for a hotel where they find the actual location of the bomb. The police and FBI start evacuating the building. Shaw finds the bomb, but Dixon won't let him defuse it. Cosgrove finds Sirenko, but gets away once the bomb detonates. Rollins finds Sirenko taking hostages inside a clothing store. Cosgrove, Shaw, and Stabler are able to pursue Sirenko in an alleyway where he is arrested. Note: This episode continues a crossover event that begins on the season three premiere of Law & Order: Organized Crime and concludes on the season twenty-two premiere of Law & Order.
518	2	"The One You Feed"	Norberto Barba	David Graziano & Julie Martin	September 29, 2022	2401	4.62
A group of teens from the BX9 gang terrorize an Ohioan family of tourists. McGrath teams up the SVU detectives with the Bronx Gang Unit to track down the perpetrators. Captain Mike Duarte (Maurice Compte) offers Velasco a spot on the Gang Unit, while Junior Detective Grace Muncy transfers from the Gang Unit to SVU, and Rollins deals with having been shot. Benson, Duarte, and the D.A.'s office clash over a plea bargain to take down the BX9 gang leader.: First appearance of Molly Burnett as Detective Grace Muncy.
519	3	"Mirror Effect"	Michael Smith	Teleplay by : Julie Martin & Margaret Rose Lester; Story by : David Graziano & Julie Martin	October 6, 2022	2402	4.16
Two young pop stars with troubled backgrounds escalate their volatile relationship to the point where SVU must make an arrest, while their parents compound the problem as the media and fans fuel the fire. Rollins continues to struggle with PTSD, which also begins to affect her children at home.
520	4	"The Steps We Cannot Take"	Juan J. Campanella	Brianna Yellen & Kathy Dobie	October 13, 2022	2404	4.36
The home invasion and shooting of Nisha and Rav Singh to kidnap their teen daughter Priya leads the squad to shocking discoveries at the home of the perpetrator's father, Soren Olsen, who is found dead and buried in the yard. Two prior abductees, Nadine, who is pregnant, and Gillian who has a daughter Bella by Soren, are also found locked up with Priya. Benson and Chief A.D.A. Maxwell must then decide who to arrest for Soren's murder. Meanwhile, Fin and Velasco continue to mentor Muncy on fitting in with the squad.
521	5	"Breakwater"	Jean de Segonzac	Teleplay by : Denis Hamill & Monet Hurst-Mendoza; Story by : Denis Hamill	October 27, 2022	2405	4.42
A young lifeguard discloses being raped by his boss, Paul Greco, and asks the SVU for help when he suspects his boss is also preying on his sister. Velasco finds yet another female victim who is reluctant to testify in court after she is threatened with the violation of her father's probation. The investigation then expands to include depraved indifference murder for several related drowning deaths attributable to incompetent lifeguards in Greco's "pay or lay" qualification scheme.
522	6	"Controlled Burn"	Oscar René Lozoya II	Teleplay by : David Graziano & Nolan Dunbar; Story by : David Graziano & Julie Martin	November 3, 2022	2406	3.90
Rollins continues fighting her "monster" and delivers a seminar on sexual compulsion. Meanwhile, Maggie D'Angelo (Brooke Bloom) is drugged, raped, and strangled by a man in a crow mask at an underground private brownstone party for high-powered VIPs. The investigation uncovers video of the party-goers' sexual activities, leading detectives to the owner of the brownstones; a powerful businesswoman, Lena Hess (Lola Glaudini).
523	7	"Dead Ball"	Michael Smith	Brendan Feeney & Kathy Dobie & Gabriel Vallejo	November 10, 2022	2407	4.12
Reporter Nellie Kramer tells Benson about being raped after she interviewed popular soccer star Paolo Rocha, but Kramer refuses to file charges to protect her son. Benson and her squad investigate Rocha's past and uncovers a dozen other victims, including the sixteen-year-old daughter of Rocha's longtime friend and manager, leading to Rocha's downfall.
524	8	"A Better Person"	Michael Pressman	Teleplay by : Brianna Yellen & Margaret Rose Lester; Story by : David Graziano	November 17, 2022	2408	4.95
While Rollins ponders a potential opportunity to teach forensic psychology, the SVU hunts for a suspect who violently sodomizes, bites, and kills his victims, beginning with the son of Detective Mark McDaniels (Greg Grunberg), who had no idea his son Aidan wanted to become his daughter Aida. Benson and Rollins then get another call that he struck again with yet another transgender victim, Cora Jones (Rain Valdez). Muncy apprehends Belgian national Lukas Peeters, but McDaniels faces losing his badge for tampering with evidence.
525	9	"And a Trauma in a Pear Tree"	Norberto Barba	David Graziano & Julie Martin	December 8, 2022	2409	4.97
Carisi and Rollins attend the most important arraignment of their lives; their wedding. Noah's Christmas wish comes true when he and Benson meet Noah's half-brother Connor, another child of criminal Johnny D (from Season 16, Episodes 15 "Undercover Mother" and 23 "Surrendering Noah"). Benson finds a hidden camera in her Woodstock hotel that starts an off-duty, non-jurisdictional investigation. She and Rollins help take down the perpetrators, after which, Rollins tells Benson about her new teaching job at Fordham University. After many delays and motions, the trial of Elias Olsen begins (after the events in "The Steps We Cannot Take"), but it is put in jeopardy by a slick defense attorney's accusal of police brutality by Muncy.: Final appearance of Kelli Giddish (Detective Amanda Rollins) as she departed the series after this episode.
526	10	"Jumped In"	Martha Mitchell	Teleplay by : Brendan Feeney & Monet Hurst-Mendoza; Story by : Kadia Saraf & Terry Serpico	January 5, 2023	2410	5.49
Benson is attacked outside her home by the Tremont clique of BX9, green-lit by gang leader Oscar Papa, in retaliation for the events in "The One You Feed". Chief McGrath calls Bronx Gang Unit Captain Duarte to liaise with Benson, and to support Bronx SVU. Det. Bruno picks out a cold case for Benson in which six deaf schoolgirls were raped, for which Pup Peters was wrongfully jailed. Lieutenant Dixon (from the newly revived seasons of Law & Order) offers to translate ASL for the victims. The perpetrator is found through a familial DNA search, and his angry motive becomes clear; his hated mother is also deaf. Benson assigns Fin to work with Det. Bruno and "white shield" Ofcr. Churlish to clear their case backlog. At the hospital, Benson confronts the BX9 teen who attacked her.
527	11	"Soldier Up"	Jonathan Herron	David Graziano & Julie Martin	January 12, 2023	2411	5.13
Benson tries to help Albert "Fugazi" Diaz, the BX9 gang member who attacked her. He was told by BX9 to "soldier up" or they would rape his mother again. Capt. Duarte shows Benson shocking evidence of a "rape tree" with underwear from the raped mothers and sisters of BX9 members, used to recruit and threaten members into gang loyalty. Muncy and Benson find one of the victims to track those responsible, and Tutuola and Bruno interrogate Lindsay "Bug Bear" Del Toro, who raped Fugazi's mother. Fin helps vet the hiring of new Bronx SVU detectives. Fugazi gives up Benny "Maestro" Barros who is picked up and flipped against Oscar Papa.
528	12	"Blood Out"	Patricia Riggen	David Graziano & Julie Martin	January 26, 2023	2412	5.77
Carisi puts BX9 crime boss Oscar Papa on trial, but quickly gets short on witnesses. Velasco plays "dirty" to get information from another witness, but Churlish secretly records him and passes it to Benson. Meanwhile, Tutuola and Bruno try to help a woman who was drugged-darted with wildnil, raped, and left for dead in a garbage truck, leading to veterinarian Tim Birch. Capt. Duarte is attacked and killed with machetes by five BX9 gang members, as ordered by Papa who confesses to the murder.
529	13	"Intersection"	Norberto Barba & Juan J. Campanella	David Graziano & Julie Martin	February 2, 2023	2413	5.34
A car crash prompts the SVU to track down an ambulance driver who rapes female crash victims. Bruno's ex-wife demonstrates the use of an InfraPass that EMTs use to change traffic lights as proof that the suspect might have deliberately caused the accidents. A third attempted rape leads to multiple fatalities as detectives close in on the suspect, who has taken a hostage. Fin introduces Detective Bruno to Manhattan SVU, and Benson has Muncy listen to Velasco's "confession" recorded by Churlish.
530	14	"Dutch Tears"	Bethany Rooney	Monet Hurst-Mendoza & Kathy Dobie & Gabriel Vallejo	February 16, 2023	2414	5.13
Ivan "Dutch" Hernandez (Richard Cabral), a convict released after 23 years in jail, waits with a gun in the home of his arresting officer, Fin, who had just won the Harlem Heart award. Hernandez tells Fin he wants justice against a rapist who branded him with an "H", and against the corrections officer who let the rapist into his cell when he was only 17. Fin calls Bruno, Benson and Carisi to help find, identify, and arrest the suspects. While they stake out a bar to ID the suspect, Hernandez explains how "Dutch Tears" relate to his nickname. Fin tells Bruno about his old partner John Munch, who recently married a female rabbi and moved back to Baltimore to run a bar.: Richard Belzer, who played Munch for the show's first sixteen seasons, died three days after this episode aired.
531	15	"King of the Moon"	Mariska Hargitay	David Graziano & Julie Martin	February 23, 2023	2415	5.01
Neurologist and writer Pen Humphreys (Bradley Whitford), who suffers from dementia, confesses to raping and murdering his life-long wife Winnie (Nancy Travis). Carisi believes there’s more to the case and asks Benson to dig deeper before the Homicide Squad closes the case. Fin and Churlish interrogate Velasco about his "confession" to shooting someone for his boss. Velasco tells them about growing up in Ciudad Juárez and being trained as a sicario (contract killer) for the cartel when he was only 15 years old. Fin tells Benson how impressed he is with Churlish.: Humphreys describes Benson as having "an ass like the devil and a face like Jayne Mansfield", a reference to Mariska Hargitay's mother.; This episode was dedicated to the memory of Richard Belzer.
532	16	"The Presence of Absence"	Norberto Barba	Brianna Yellen & Brendan Feeney	March 23, 2023	2416	4.56
A young widow, Zoe Greene, is raped by a match on an internet dating site while blindfolded by her dead husband's tie. After setting a trap, she discovers it was her best friend who was trying to impregnate her with her own nephew's sperm. Muncy struggles with Velasco's absence and argues with Churlish who got Velasco into hot water. At Chief McGrath's instruction, and Benson's agreement with Fin's recommendation, Churlish joins Manhattan SVU.
533	17	"Lime Chaser"	Juan J. Campanella	David Graziano & Julie Martin	March 30, 2023	2417	4.30
The squad searches for suspects who drug women's drinks in order to deliver them to clients who rape them. The investigation leads the SVU to Muncy’s brother who agrees to become part of a sting operation. To impress Benson by catching the perpetrators, Churlish puts herself into a risky operation without Benson's approval. Benson later warns Churlish to put teamwork before ambitious perfection.
534	18	"Bubble Wrap"	Batán Silva	Teleplay by : Margaret Rose Lester & Nolan Dunbar; Story by : Denis Hamill	April 6, 2023	2418	4.57
Construction tycoon Connie Parish (Michelle Gomez) obstructs the SVU investigation into her son Martin (Joseph Cross) after he rapes employee Mona Stewart. Carisi is unable to indict when Stewart is bought off by Connie. Charges escalate to murder after Stewart is found dead from cocaine adulterated with an industrial abrasive. The same abrasive is then found in her son's lungs, implicating Connie in both cases.
535	19	"Bend the Law"	Martha Mitchell	Teleplay by : Brendan Feeney & Gabriel Vallejo; Story by : David Graziano & Julie Martin	April 27, 2023	2419	4.39
Carisi treads carefully after Lorraine Maxwell's husband, Roger Briggs (Tom Irwin), is implicated in sex trafficking of fifteen-year-old girls at the prestigious Whitmere Club. Benson sends Churlish and Velasco to Camden, Maine to take his old friend Anthony "Chili" Suarez, now working as a schoolteacher, into custody for a cartel hit.
536	20	"Debatable"	Jean de Segonzac	Teleplay by : Brianna Yellen & Kelly Minster; Story by : Julie Martin & Kathy Dobie	May 4, 2023	2420	4.28
Benson tries to help a student, Naomi Hayes, when she is raped after a debate tournament, but she won't disclose which of four boys was responsible. After one of the boys shows detectives a video of the assault, Naomi reveals that it was her coaches, Parker & Helene Young, but they claim it was consensual. Fin suspects a defense witness and former student, Colin Sharpe, may not be telling the whole truth, and Benson thinks it may have been yet another rape. It's then left to Carisi to impeach Sharpe's testimony in open court.
537	21	"Bad Things"	Juan J. Campanella	Teleplay by : Julie Martin & Nicholas Evangelista; Story by : David Graziano	May 11, 2023	2421	4.24
Kate Wallace, a tourist from Columbus, Ohio, is raped in her hotel room by a perp who addresses her by name and takes a selfie. Soon after, Mark Reed is found in the wilderness, stuck for weeks in a hole with empty bags of licorice all around, reminding Muncy of the control technique Elias Olsen once used. Reed later dies in the hospital. Muncy and Churlish question Reed's wife, Shelly, who identifies the body. Soon, another rape is reported in the West Village at a tea house, again calling the victim, Evie Quinn, by name and taking a selfie, though this time she was watched by her stalker Billy Vitale. Vitale is confronted by Fin and Velasco, but denies knowledge. Special Victims Division reports three similar previous assaults with the same patterns in the past six months. Reed's wife says that he went missing after going into the city and making a charge at a bakery; a baker there identifies Elias Olsen as someone to whom Reed was speaking. On Staten Island, Benson and Carisi speak with Darlene Quinlan, a previous victim who called off an engagement with her fiancé Greg a week before the wedding. Benson and Carisi speak with Greg, who denies knowledge, but obvious bitter feelings lead Benson to believe that the rapist was hired. Fin and Velasco question Maria Varga, a nanny who claimed that Brooklyn Special Victims Unit matched DNA to a convict from Green Haven, Junior Suarez, who is officially still imprisoned. They go question Derek Scully, her last boss with whom she once hooked up before quitting the next day, but he again denies knowledge. Benson and Carisi go to Rose Bergman (Suzana Norberg), who was raped in her office after filing for divorce from her husband of 25 years, Harvey. Muncy and Churlish track Olsen to a church and arrest him after some coercing. With no concrete evidence linking the rapes, Elliot Stabler and the Organized Crime Control Bureau are called in to cooperate with the Special Victims Unit. This begins a four-episode crossover that continues in Law & Order: Organized Crime, Season 3, Episode 21 "Shadowërk", followed by Law & Order: Special Victims Unit Season 24, Episode 22 "All Pain Is One Malady", and concludes in Law & Order: Organized Crime, Season 3, Episode 22 "With Many Names".
538	22	"All Pain Is One Malady"	Norberto Barba	David Graziano & Julie Martin	May 18, 2023	2422	4.37
A website called Shadowërk is behind a large revenge-for-hire scheme that reaches globally. Agent McCrary investigates an IP Address in Dublin, Ohio, which is the location of an office called Escrow. Chief McGrath shows up to put the pressure on Benson and the Unit to arrest the perps in New York, risking getting on Shadowërk's radar. Kate Wallice is attacked again while taking a walk. She later gives DNA evidence to Fin and Bruno that she spit into a hoodie. Slootmaekers works on a virus to slow down their progress on the dark web in hopes they replace their servers. Kate's new attacker later goes after a 14-year-old boy, Manny Lopez. Shadowërk goes down in possible reply to Slootmaeker's virus, leaving their leader in the wind. The serial rapist strikes again in the subway, attacking Yves Netty, a 22-year-old male college student. Netty did not get raped and stabbed the attacker in the abdomen. All the hospitals in the area are monitored and he's spotted in an urgent care, identified as Randy Gordon, and arrested. Gordon confesses to seven other attacks in the past year. At Escrow, an IT person rushes to investigate the servers. Running the plates on the unmarked car identifies Jacob Bettencourt, a student from Kenyon College. He attempts to steal the server before McCrary arrests him. Benson and Stabler are called in to Ohio when Shadowërk comes back online faster, now with a hit for Benson and Stabler set at a $50,000 bounty.: Final appearance of Molly Burnett as Detective Grace Muncy.; This is the third in a four-episode crossover, continued from Law & Order: Organized Crime, Season 3, Episode 21 "Shadowërk", that concludes in Law & Order: Organized Crime, Season 3, Episode 22 "With Many Names".

== Ratings ==
Viewership and ratings per episode of Law & Order: Special Victims Unit season 24
No.	Title	Air date	Rating/share (18–49)	Viewers (millions)	DVR (18–49)	DVR viewers (millions)	Total (18–49)	Total viewers (millions)
1	"Gimme Shelter – Part Two"	September 22, 2022	0.7	5.47	0.3	1.84	1.0	7.31
2	"The One You Feed"	September 29, 2022	0.5	4.62	0.4	2.29	0.9	6.91
3	"Mirror Effect"	October 6, 2022	0.6	4.16	0.4	2.13	1.0	6.29
4	"The Steps We Cannot Take"	October 13, 2022	0.6	4.36	0.4	2.16	1.0	6.53
5	"Breakwater"	October 27, 2022	0.6	4.42	0.4	2.29	1.0	6.71
6	"Controlled Burn"	November 3, 2022	0.5	3.90	0.4	2.24	0.9	6.14
7	"Dead Ball"	November 10, 2022	0.5	4.12	0.5	2.48	1.0	6.60
8	"A Better Person"	November 17, 2022	0.6	4.95	0.4	2.11	1.0	7.06
9	"And a Trauma in a Pear Tree"	December 8, 2022	0.6	4.97	0.4	2.21	1.0	7.19
10	"Jumped In"	January 5, 2023	0.6	5.49	0.5	2.34	1.10	7.83
11	"Soldier Up"	January 12, 2023	0.6	5.13	0.4	2.27	1.10	7.39
12	"Blood Out"	January 26, 2023	0.7	5.77	0.4	2.18	1.10	7.95
13	"Intersection"	February 2, 2023	0.6	5.34	0.5	2.29	1.10	7.62
14	"Dutch Tears"	February 16, 2023	0.7	5.13	0.5	2.34	1.10	7.47
15	"King of the Moon"	February 23, 2023	0.6	5.01	0.4	2.24	1.0	7.25
16	"The Presence of Absence"	March 23, 2023	0.5	4.56	—N/a	—N/a	—N/a	—N/a
17	"Lime Chaser"	March 30, 2023	0.5	4.30	—N/a	—N/a	—N/a	—N/a
18	"Bubble Wrap"	April 6, 2023	0.5	4.57	—N/a	—N/a	—N/a	—N/a
19	"Bend the Law"	April 27, 2023	0.5	4.39	—N/a	—N/a	—N/a	—N/a
20	"Debatable"	May 4, 2023	0.4	4.28	—N/a	—N/a	—N/a	—N/a
21	"Bad Things"	May 11, 2023	0.5	4.24	—N/a	—N/a	—N/a	—N/a
22	"All Pain Is One Malady"	May 18, 2023	0.4	4.37	—N/a	—N/a	—N/a	—N/a
