= Coyote (TV series) =

American crime drama television series

- Genre: Crime drama
- Created by: David Graziano; Michael Carnes; Josh Gilbert
- Starring: Michael Chiklis
- Music by: H. Scott Salinas
- Country of origin: United States
- Original language: English
- No. of seasons: 1
- No. of episodes: 6

Production
- Executive producers: David Graziano; Michael Carnes; Josh Gilbert; Michelle MacLaren; Mike Richardson; Keith Goldberg; Rebecca Hobbs; Michael Chiklis
- Producer: Jose Ludlow
- Production companies: Dark Horse Entertainment; The Carnes & Gilbert Business; Narrative/Ballistics; MacLaren Entertainment; Paramount Network Original; Sony Pictures Television Studios

Original release
- Network: CBS All Access
- Release: January 7, 2021

Coyote is an American crime drama television series created by David Graziano, Michael Carnes and Josh Gilbert. The series stars Michael Chiklis and premiered on CBS All Access on January 7, 2021.

The series was originally ordered as ten episodes, targeted for sibling Paramount Network, but eventually was passed off to CBS All Access as a six-episode season. In January 2023, the series was removed from Paramount+.

== Premise ==
=== Main protagonist ===
After 32 years of working as a Border Patrol agent, Ben Clemens is forced to work for the people he spent his career trying to keep out of the United States.

== Cast ==
- Michael Chiklis as Ben Clemens, a recently retired U.S. Border Patrol agent
- Juan Pablo Raba as Juan Diego "El Catrin" Zamora, the head of a small family cartel
- Adriana Paz as Silvia Peña, manager of a local restaurant
- Kristyan Ferrer as Dante, a member of the cartel
- Octavio Pisano as Sultan, a member of the cartel
- Cynthia McWilliams as Holly Vincent, federal agent for Homeland Security Investigations
- Julio Cesar Cedillo as Neto Mendez, an officer in the Guardia Nacional de México
- Emy Mena as María Elena Flores, who is carrying Dante's child
- Kelli Williams as Jill Kerr

== Episodes ==
No.	Title	Directed by	Written by	Original release date
1	"Call of the Void"	Michelle MacLaren	Michael Carnes & Josh Gilbert & David Graziano	January 7, 2021
2	"Silver or Lead"	Michelle MacLaren	Michael Carnes & Josh Gilbert & David Graziano	January 7, 2021
3	"Sin of Origin"	Guy Ferland	David Graziano & Maria Renee Prudencio	January 7, 2021
4	"Juan Doe"	Guy Ferland	David Graziano & Katrina Cabrera Ortega	January 7, 2021
5	"King Tide"	Stephen Kay	Michael Carnes & David Graziano	January 7, 2021
6	"Plaza De Nada"	Stephen Kay	Josh Gilbert & Kseniya Melnik	January 7, 2021

== Production ==
=== Development ===
Development of the series was first announced on May 1, 2019. On June 26, 2019, it was reported that Paramount Network had given a 10-episode straight-to-series order to Coyote. On November 19, 2020, it was announced that the series would debut on CBS All Access rather than Paramount Network.

=== Filming ===
Filming occurred in Baja California in January 2020.

== Critical response ==
Review aggregator Metacritic gave the series a score of 65 out of 100, indicating "generally favorable reviews", based on 8 professional critics.
