= Anna (2015 Colombian film) =

2015 film

- Film poster
- Directed by: Jacques Toulemonde Vidal
- Written by: Jacques Toulemonde Vidal
- Starring: Juana Acosta
- Release date: 14 November 2015 (Stockholm IFF)
- Running time: 96 minutes
- Countries: Colombia; France
- Languages: Spanish; French

Anna is a 2015 Colombian-French drama film directed by Jacques Toulemonde Vidal. The film was named on the shortlist for Colombia's entry for the Academy Award for Best Foreign Language Film at the 89th Academy Awards, but it was not selected.

== Cast ==
- Kolia Abiteboul as Nathan
- Juana Acosta as Anna
- Bruno Clairefond as Bruno
- Fabrice Colson as L'homme à l'aéroport
- Augustin Legrand as Philippe

== Awards and nominations ==
=== Goya Awards ===
Year	Category	Result
2017	Best Spanish Language Foreign Film	Nominated
