= Juana Acosta =

Colombian and Spanish actress

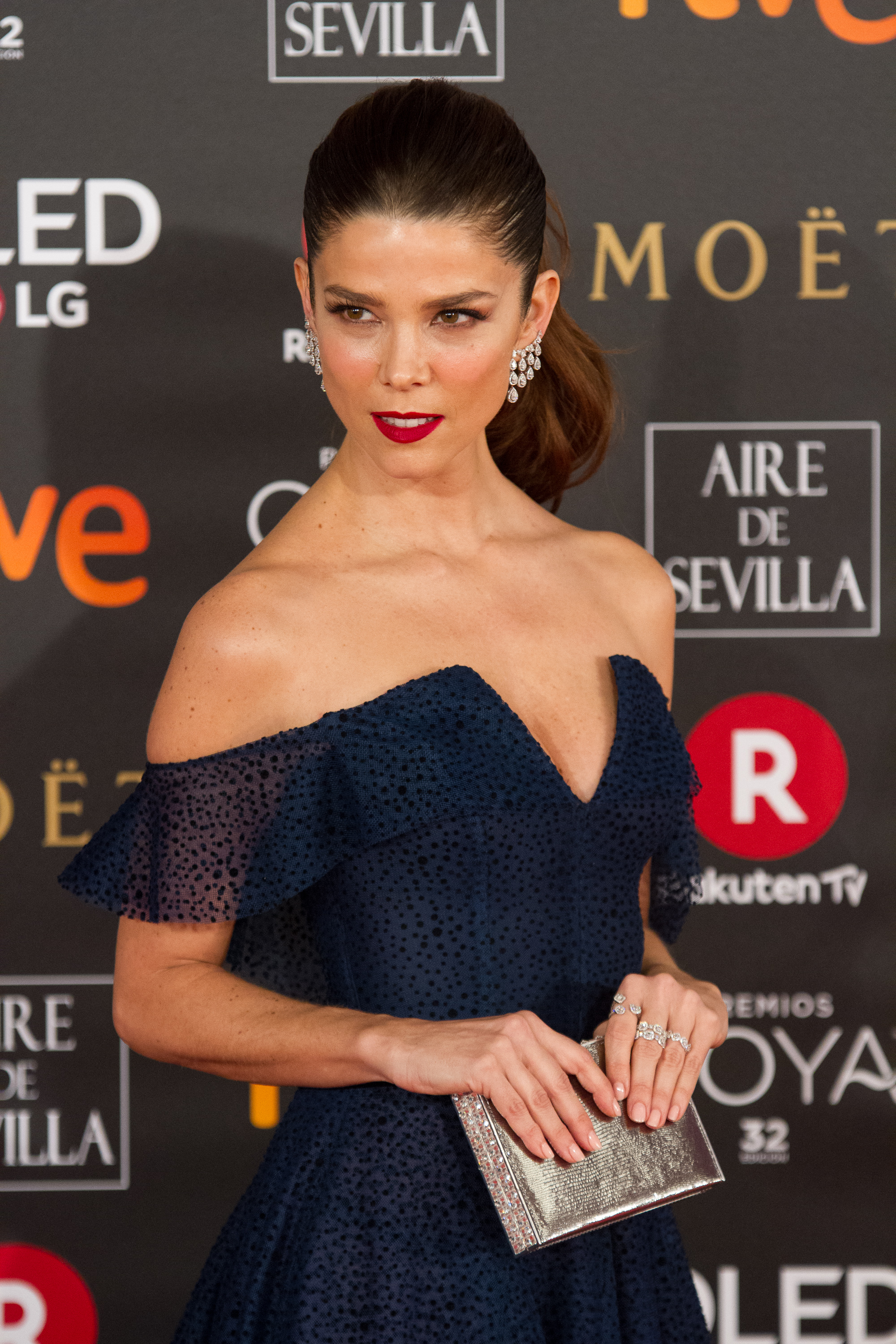
- Acosta in 2018
- Born: 28 November 1976 (age 49); Cali, Valle del Cauca, Colombia
- Occupation: Actress
- Years active: 1995–present
- Relatives: Valentina Acosta (sister)

Juana Acosta Restrepo (born 28 November 1976) is a Colombian and Spanish actress. She has appeared in more than 40 films.

== Biography ==
Juana Acosta was born in Cali, Valle del Cauca, on 28 November 1976. Her younger sister Valentina has also pursued an acting career. Juana Acosta made her television debut with an appearance in the Colombian telenovela Mascarada, whereas she made her film debut featuring in the 1998 film Time Out. She moved to Spain in 2000, making her debut in Spanish television with an appearance in Policías, en el corazón de la calle. She has a daughter with her ex-partner, fellow actor Ernesto Alterio. She earned a nomination to the Goya Award for Best Supporting Actress for her performance in the 2020 film One Careful Owner.

== Selected filmography ==
=== Film ===
Year	Title	Role	Notes	Ref.
1998	Golpe de estadio (Time Out)			
2005	Los 2 lados de la cama (The 2 Sides of the Bed)	Gema		
2005	A golpes (A golpes)	Juanita		
2006	Bienvenido a casa (Welcome Home)	Nieves		
2010	Una hora más en Canarias (With or Without Love)	Mónica		
2013	Libertador (The Liberator)	Manuela Sáenz		
2015	Tiempo sin aire (Breathless Time)	María		
2015	Anna	Anna		
2016	Acantilado (The Cliff)	Helena		
2016	7 Años	Verónica		
2017	Perfectos desconocidos (Perfect Strangers)	Ana		
2018	Jefe	Ariana		
2018	Ola de crímenes (Crime Wave)	Susana		
2019	Imprisoned	Maria		
2020	El inconveniente (One Careful Owner)	Sara		
2021	Las consecuencias (The Consequences)	Fabiola		
2022	Llegaron de noche (What Lucia Saw)	Lucía Barrera de Cerna		
2023	Lobo feroz	Vidal		
2024	La fianza (The Bond)	Ana		

=== Television ===
Year	Title	Role	Notes	Ref.
2007	Génesis: en la mente del asesino	Sofía Santana		
2008–09	Hospital Central	Dra. Sofía Carrillo	Introduced in season 15	
2010	Adolfo Suárez, el presidente	Carmen Díez de Rivera	TV movie aired as a 2-part miniseries	
2011	Crematorio	Mónica		
2011–12	Hispania, la leyenda	Aldara	Introduced in season 2	
2014–15	Velvet	Sara Ortega	8 episodes	
2018–19	Gigantes	Lucía		
2021	La templanza (The Vineyard)	Carola Gorostiza		
2021	El inocente (The Innocent)	Emma Durán / María Luján	8 episodes	

== Accolades ==
Year	Award	Category	Work	Result	Ref.
2012	21st Actors and Actresses Union Awards	Best Television Actress in a Secondary Role	Crematorio	Won	
2016	5th Macondo Awards	Best Actress	Anna	Won	
2016	3rd Fénix Awards	Best Actress	Anna	Nominated	
2017	4th Platino Awards	Best Actress	Anna	Nominated	
2021	8th Feroz Awards	Best Supporting Actress in a Film	One Careful Owner	Nominated	
2021	35th Goya Awards	Best Supporting Actress	One Careful Owner	Nominated	
