= Imprisoned (film) =

2019 American thriller drama film

- Film poster.
- Directed by: Paul Kampf
- Written by: Paul Kampf
- Produced by: Luiollo Ruiz; Paul Kampf; Holly Levow; Tom Sperry
- Starring: Laurence Fishburne; Juan Pablo Raba; Juana Acosta; Esai Morales; Jon Huertas; John Heard; Edward James Olmos
- Cinematography: Rene Jung
- Edited by: Andres Ramirez
- Music by: Robert Rospide
- Production companies: Equitas Entertainment Partners; Positive Catalyst; Kidlat Entertainment; The Pimineta Film Company; Blue Rider Pictures
- Distributed by: Cinema Libre Studio
- Release dates: October 25, 2018 (Los Angeles premiere); September 13, 2019
- Running time: 104 minutes
- Country: United States
- Language: English

Imprisoned is a 2018 American thriller drama film written and directed by Paul Kampf and starring Laurence Fishburne, Juan Pablo Raba, Juana Acosta, Esai Morales, Jon Huertas, John Heard (in his final film after his death in 2017), and Edward James Olmos.

== Plot ==
Dylan Burke was a small-time criminal in the past and made a lot of mistakes, but he moved past his troubled past when he met Maria, the love of his life. Maria owns a charming seashore coffee shop, and Dylan is currently employed as an open-water fisherman. It is the perfect existence that neither of them ever imagined they would have.

== Cast ==
- Laurence Fishburne as Daniel Calvin
- Juan Pablo Raba as Dylan Burke
- Juana Acosta as Maria
- Edward James Olmos
- John Heard
- Esai Morales
- Jon Huertas
- Ana Isabelle

== Production ==
The film was shot entirely in Puerto Rico in 2017 before Hurricane Maria hit.

== Release ==
Cinema Libre Studio acquired North American distribution rights to the film in July 2019.

The film was released in theaters on September 13, 2019.

== Reception ==
The film has a 0% rating on Rotten Tomatoes. Jeffrey M. Anderson of Common Sense Media awarded the film two stars out of five. Alex Saveliev of Film Threat gave it a five out of ten.
