= Los caballeros las prefieren brutas =

- Genre: Dramedy
- Based on: Los caballeros las prefieren brutas by Isabella Santodomingo
- Written by: Julio Cabello; Marlon Quintero; Rosa Clemente García; Claudia Sánchez; Jorge Hiller
- Directed by: Alessandro Angulo; Carlos Moreno; Juan Felipe Orozco; Henry Rivero
- Starring: Valerie Domínguez; Juan Pablo Raba; Michelle Manterola; Mijail Mulkay; Patricia Castañeda; Gustavo Ángel
- Music by: César Escola
- Country of origin: Colombia
- Original language: Spanish
- No. of seasons: 2
- No. of episodes: 62

Production
- Executive producers: Alessandro Angulo; Marlon Quintero; Nana Velásquez; Carlos Lamus
- Production location: Bogotá, Colombia
- Cinematography: Alfredo Ruiz
- Production companies: Sony Pictures Television; Laberinto Producciones; Caracol Televisión

Original release
- Network: Sony Entertainment Television; Caracol Televisión
- Release: 22 February 2010 – 6 January 2012

Los caballeros las prefieren brutas is a Colombian dramedy created and produced by Caracol Televisión, and Sony Pictures Television. The series is based on the Best-selling novel of the same name by the writer Isabella Santodomingo. The first season composed of 22 episodes premiered worldwide, except for Colombia on 22 February 2010, and concluded on 26 July 2010. While the second season consisting of 40 episodes premiered on 13 October 2011. It stars Colombian actress Valerie Domínguez, and Juan Pablo Raba.

In Colombia, the series premiered on 20 July 2010 on Caracol Televisión, and concluded in general on 6 January 2012. During its first season in Colombia, the series averaged a rating of 11.8. While the second season averaged only 5.8 ratings during its broadcast.

The series revolves around Cristina Oviedo (Valerie Domínguez), a beautiful young woman, who is about to get married, but upon discovering the infidelity of her promised future, decides to throw him out of his house and in his desperate search to find someone to help her with the expenses in the apartment, decide to rent a room to Alejandro Botero (Juan Pablo Raba), a man who appears to be gay in order to be accepted as a tenant.

== Cast ==
=== Main ===
- Valerie Domínguez as Cristina Oviedo
- Juan Pablo Raba as Alejandro Botero
- Michelle Manterola as Gracia Oviedo
- Mijail Mulkay as Rodrigo Florez
- Patricia Castañeda as Hannah de la Espriella
- Gustavo Ángel as Miguel Forero
- Patricia Bermúdez as Roberta Acevedo

=== Recurring ===
- Ángela Vergara as Pamela Davila
- Juan Pablo Espinosa as Eduardo Santodomingo
- Carolina Acevedo as Martina
- Bárbara Perea as Nelsy
- Luigi Aycardi as Armando Villalba
- Valentina Acosta as Luna
- Arap Bethke as Manuel Carmona
- Luciano D'Alessandro as Ricaldo Altunez
- Majida Issa as Lili
- Sebastián Martínez as Kenny Paulsen
- Héctor de Malba as Leandro
- Roberto Manrique as Daniel
- Santiago Rodríguez as René Campiña
- Kathy Sáenz as Isabella
