= Jefe (2018 film) =

2018 Spanish-Portugal comedy film

- Film poster
- Directed by: Sergio Barrejón
- Written by: Natxo López; Marta Sofía Martins
- Produced by: Carlo D'Ursi; María Luisa Gutiérrez
- Starring: Luis Callejo; Juana Acosta; Carlos D'Ursi; Josean Bengoetxea; Bárbara Santa-Cruz; Maica Barroso; Adam Jezierski; Sergio Quintana; Diana Lázaro; Dalila Carmo
- Cinematography: Antonio J. García
- Edited by: Raúl de Torres
- Music by: Jimmy Barnatán; Ana Álvarez Prada
- Production companies: Potenza Producciones; Bowfinger International Pictures; Jefe La Película AIE; Fado Filmes
- Distributed by: Súper 8
- Release dates: 15 April 2018 (Málaga); 6 July 2018 (Spain)
- Running time: 89 minutes
- Countries: Spain; Portugal
- Language: Spanish

Jefe is a 2018 comedy film directed by Sergio Barrejón and written by Natxo López and Marta Sofía Martins. It stars Luis Callejo and Juana Acosta. It is a Spanish-Portuguese co-production.

== Plot ==
César, a rude and self-centered businessman, appears to be on the verge of losing everything until a night janitor at his office assists him in discovering much-needed self-discipline.

== Cast ==
- Luis Callejo as César
- Juana Acosta as Ariana
- Carlo D'Ursi as Gómez
- Josean Bengoetxea as Javier
- Bárbara Santa-Cruz as Teresa
- Maica Barroso as Jimena
- Adam Jezierski as Charly
- Sergio Quintana as Garrido
- Diana Lázaro
- Dalila Carmo

== Production ==
Jefe was produced by Potenza Producciones, Bowfinger International Pictures, and Jefe La Película AIE alongside Fado Filmes, and it had support of ICAA, Ibermedia and the Madrid regional administration.

== Release ==
The film premiered on 15 April 2018 at the 21st Málaga Spanish Film Festival. Distributed by Súper 8, it was theatrically released in Spain on 6 July 2018. It was released on 26 October 2018 on Netflix streaming.

== Accolades ==
Year	Award	Category	Nominee(s)	Result	Ref.
2019	33rd Goya Awards	Best Adapted Screenplay	Marta Sofía Martins, Natxo López	Nominated	

== See also ==
- List of Spanish films of 2018
