= Juan Pablo Raba =

Colombian film, TV and telenovela actor (born 1977)

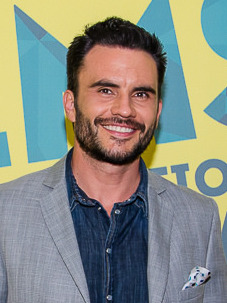
- Raba in 2015
- Born: Juan Pablo Raba Vidal; 14 January 1977 (age 49); Bogotá, Colombia
- Years active: 1998–present
- Spouse: Mónica Fonseca (m. 2011)
- Children: 2

Juan Pablo Raba Vidal (born 14 January 1977) is a Colombian film, TV and telenovela actor, best known internationally for his role as Gustavo Gaviria in the 2015 Netflix series Narcos.

== Early life ==
Raba was born in Bogotá, Colombia where he graduated from Colegio Nueva Granada. After his parents' divorce, he was raised in Spain by his Argentinian father.

== Career ==
Raba subsequently returned to Colombia and worked as a model. He sought work from the Colombian TV channel Caracol, who suggested that he take acting lessons. He took acting classes in Bogota with Edgardo Roman and then continued his studies in New York at the Lee Strasberg Institute.

Not long after, he accompanied a friend to an acting class where Colombian professor Edgardo Roman was impressed by Raba's acting ability. Encouraged, Raba began attending auditions. Two months after his first audition, Caracol channel asked him to co-star in the television series Amor En Forma. In 1999, he played a small part in the TV series Marido y mujer.

Immediately after, he took the leading part in the TV series La reina de Queens. Around the same time, he appeared in the theatrical play Chronicle of a Death Foretold, based on the book by Gabriel García Márquez.

Later the Venezuelan channel RCTV asked him to co-star in the telenovela Viva La Pepa. This led to an offer to appear in La niña de mis ojos, which launched Raba's international career. In 2002's Mi gorda bella, Raba played Orestes Villanueva Mercuri, who falls in love with the good-hearted Valentina.

In 2004, when he filmed for RCTV the TV series Estrambótica Anastasia. In 2005, he returned to Colombia and filmed for the channel Caracol the TV series Por amor a Gloria. In 2006 included he appeared in the movie Una Abuela Virgen and as the main character in the TV film Soltera y sin Compromiso.

In the following years he had parts in several soap operas. In 2008 Raba appeared in El Cartel de los sapos, in a 2009 episode of Tiempo final and in an episode of Mental. After that he had a part in Los Caballeros Las Prefieren Brutas. In 2013 he was a main character in Los secretos de Lucía.

In 2014, he was cast as Gustavo Gaviria, the cousin of Pablo Escobar in Narcos. He stated that this was a very personal story for him since his uncle was killed by Escobar. In 2015 Raba joined the third season of Agents of S.H.I.E.L.D. as the Inhuman Joey Gutierrez.

== Personal life ==
In 2003, he met Colombian journalist Paula Quinteros, whom he married on 6 December in a barefoot Celtic ceremony in Los Roques, Venezuela.

In 2006, he and Paula announced their separation, which subsequently resulted in their divorce in 2007.

In August 2011, he married television presenter Mónica Fonseca in a private ceremony in Miami, United States. On 19 July 2012, his wife gave birth to their son, Joaquín Raba Fonseca. Raba is an active cyclist and now resides in Miami. With his family, he has been very active in human and animal rights organizations.

== Filmography ==
=== Films ===
| Year | Title | Role | Notes |
|---|---|---|---|
| 2006 | Elipsis | Guest Party | Uncredit Cameo |
| 2006 | Anillo de compromiso | Fede | Short film |
| 2007 | Una abuela virgen | Carlos | |
| 2007 | Ni tan largos, ni tan cortos | Carlos | |
| 2007 | Puras joyitas | Bigote | |
| 2009 | Día naranja | Leo | |
| 2011 | The Snitch Cartel | John Mario Martínez / Pirulo | |
| 2012 | El cielo en tu mirada | Mario Domínguez | |
| 2012 | La Lectora | Waiter | Special appearance |
| 2013 | Secreto de Confesión | Teniente Restrepo | |
| 2015 | The 33 | Darío Segovia | |
| 2016 | 7 años | Carlos | |
| 2017 | Nacido de Nuevo | Ramon | Short film |
| 2017 | Shot Caller | Herman Gómez | |
| 2018 | Peppermint | Diego Garcia | |
| 2018 | Operation Entebbe | Juan Pablo | |
| 2019 | Imprisoned | Dylan Burke | |
| 2021 | The Marksman | Mauricio | |
| 2023 | Freelance | President Juan Venegas | |
| 2024 | Long Gone Heroes | Guapo | |

=== Television ===
| Year | Title | Role | Notes |
|---|---|---|---|
| 1998 | Amor en forma | Eduardo | |
| 1999 | Marido y mujer | Isidrio | |
| 2000 | La reina de Queens | Andres Velásquez | |
| 2001 | Viva la Pepa | Luis Ángel Perdomo | |
| 2001 | La niña de mis ojos | Alejandro Rondón | |
| 2002 | Mi gorda bella | Orestes Villanueva Mercouri | |
| 2004 | Estrambótica Anastasia | Aureliano Paz | |
| 2005 | Por amor a Gloria | Esteban Marín | |
| 2006 | Soltera y sin compromiso | Jaime Villalba | Television film |
| 2006 | Y los declaro marido y mujer | Juan Andrés Gutiérrez | |
| 2007 | Sobregiro de amor | Martín Monsalve | |
| 2008 | El cartel | John Mario Martínez / Pirulito | |
| 2008 | Tiempo final | Franco | 2 episodes |
| 2009 | Sin retorno | Diego | Episode: "Heroína" |
| 2009 | Mental | Ray Hernandez | Episode: "Pilot" |
| 2010 | El Clon | Said Hashim | Episode: "Encuentro divino" |
| 2010 | Los caballeros las prefieren brutas | Alejandro Botero | |
| 2011 | La Reina del Sur | Jaime Gutiérrez Solana | 5 episodes |
| 2011 | Flor Salvaje | Emiliano Monteverde | Episode: "Gran estreno" |
| 2012 | Pobres Rico | Gonzalo Rico | |
| 2013 | Los secretos de Lucía | Miguel Gaitán | |
| 2013 | Wake Up with No Make Up | Iván | 4 episodes |
| 2014 | El corazón del océano | Unknown role | 3 episodes |
| 2015–16 | Agents of S.H.I.E.L.D. | Joey Gutierrez | 6 episodes |
| 2015–16 | Narcos | Gustavo Gaviria | 10 episodes |
| 2017–2018 | Six | Ricky "Buddha" Ortiz | 18 episodes |
| 2018-19 | Distrito Salvaje | Jhon Jeiver "Yei Yei" | |
| 2021 | Coyote | Juan Diego "El Catrin" Zamora | |
| 2023 | Echo 3 | Ernesto Matiz | |
| 2025 | Law & Order: Special Victims Unit | Defense Attorney Andre Vaughn | Episode: Accomplice Liability |
| 2026 | Dutton Ranch | Joaquin | 9 episodes |
| TBA | Noticia de un Secuestro | Alberto Villamizar | Amazon Prime Upcoming series |
