= 7 años =

- Directed by: Roger Gual
- Written by: José Cabeza, Julia Fontana
- Screenplay by: Jose Cabeza, Julia Fontana
- Story by: Jose Cabeza
- Produced by: Guadalupe Balaguer Trelles Andrés Calderón Cristian Conti Federico Jusid Juan Mayne Elizabeth Polk
- Starring: Juana Acosta; Àlex Brendemühl
- Cinematography: Arnau Valls Colomer
- Edited by: Alberto de Toro
- Music by: Federico Jusid
- Distributed by: Contemporary Theatrical Productions
- Release date: 28 October 2016
- Running time: 1h 17min
- Country: Spain
- Language: Spanish

7 años (transl. "7 Years") is a 2016 Spanish drama film directed by Roger Gual.

== Plot ==
Four business partners have a fiscal problem in the company they work for and decide to determine which of them will take the fall and go to prison for their financial crimes. From debates and a vote in the group, whoever is nominated will be jailed for 7 years.

== Cast ==
- Juana Acosta – Veronica (Vero)
- Àlex Brendemühl – Marcel
- Paco León – Luis
- Manuel Morón – José Veiga
- Juan Pablo Raba – Carlos
