= Molly Burnett =

American actress (born 1988)

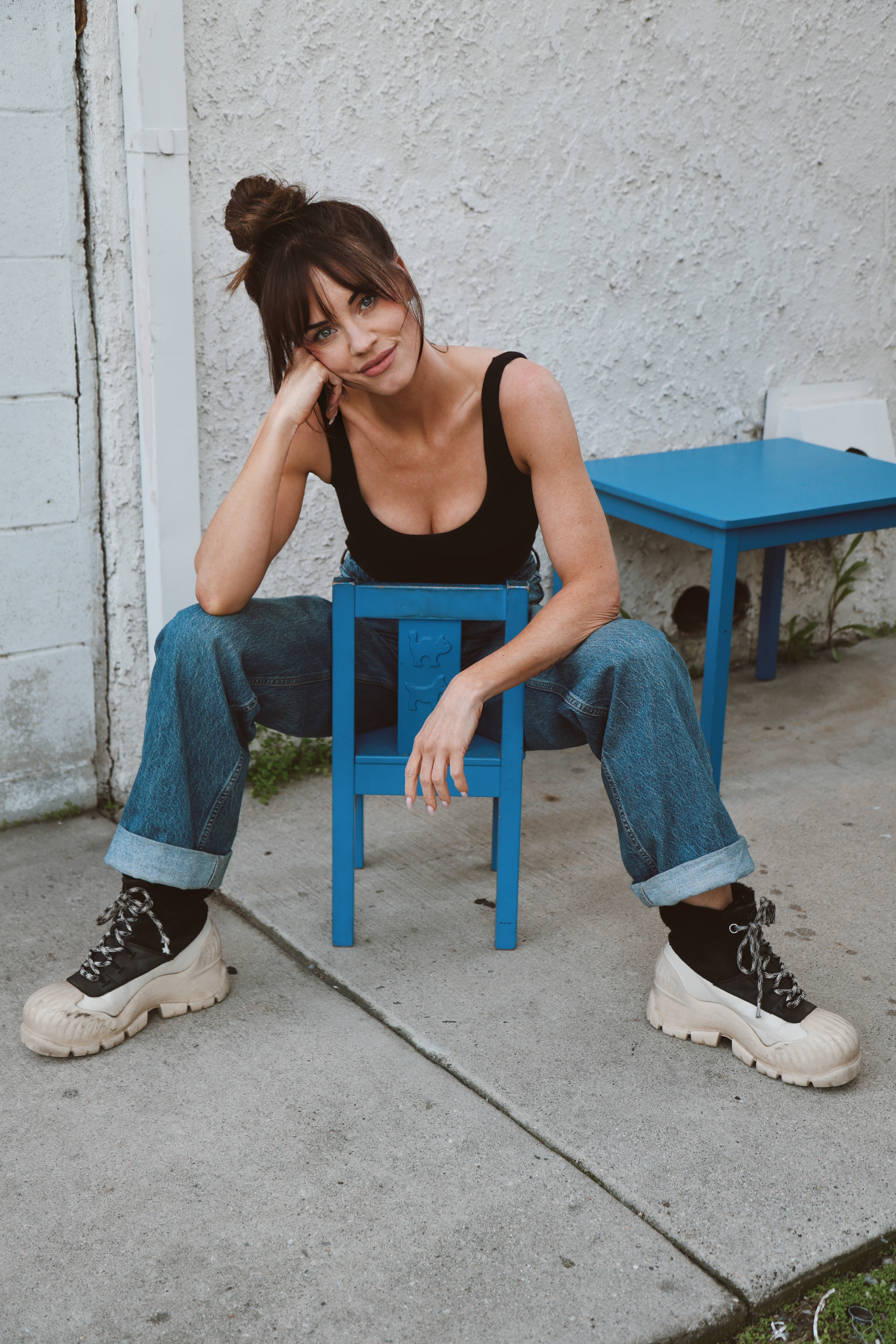
- Burnett in 2026
- Born: Molly Kathleen Burnett; April 23, 1988 (age 38); Denver, Colorado
- Occupation: Actress
- Years active: 2007–present
- Website: instagram.com/mollyburnett/

Molly Kathleen Burnett (born April 23, 1988) is an American actress. She has been nominated for three Daytime Emmy Awards: twice for Outstanding Younger Actress in a Drama Series, and once for Outstanding Supporting Actress in a Digital Daytime Drama Series.

Burnett is known for playing Melanie Jonas on the soap opera Days of Our Lives (2008–2012, 2014–2016), Kelly Ann on the crime drama series Queen of the South (2017–2021), and Grace Muncy on the crime drama series Law & Order: Special Victims Unit (2022–2023).

== Early life ==
Burnett is the first born child of Katie and David Burnett, and was raised in the Denver suburb of Littleton, Colorado along with her younger brother Will. While attending Littleton High School, she took on numerous roles at both school and theater companies in the greater Denver area. Her credits include A Midsummer Night's Dream, Noises Off, and the title role in Annie. After graduating with honors from Littleton High School, Burnett enrolled at Wagner College, a private liberal arts school on Staten Island.^{[1]}

== Career ==
In 2008, Burnett landed the role of heroine Melanie Jonas on the daytime serial Days of Our Lives. In 2012, she left daytime television to pursue other roles, landing guest spots on such prime time series as CSI: NY and Major Crimes. She also landed her first movie role, portraying Ashley Bloom in the MTV Original Film Ladies Man: A Made Movie, as well as the role of Justine Gable in the Hallmark Hall of Fame film This Magic Moment. In late 2015, Burnett appeared in the multi-episode role of Nina Moore on CSI: Cyber. Burnett's indie film credits include the roles of Lex in the sci-fi thriller Ctrl+Alt+Del, Lisa in The Wedding Party, and of Southern Belle Kate Stenson in Shattered.

Burnett returned to Days of Our Lives for a six-month stint in late 2014. In mid-2016, she temporarily played the role of Maxie Jones on the daytime serial General Hospital. In mid-2018, Burnett once again stepped in for an ailing Kirsten Storms on General Hospital as Maxie Jones. From 2017 to 2021, Burnett played Kelly Ann on USA Network's Queen of the South. In 2022, she began recurring as Detective Grace Muncy, on NBC's Law & Order: Special Victims Unit, for the show's 24th season, before being promoted to series regular beginning with the season's seventh episode. On May 19, 2023, it was announced that Burnett would be leaving the series after only one season.

== Filmography ==
=== Film ===
List of film roles
Year	Title	Role	Notes
2013	Ladies Man: A Made Movie	Ashley Bloom	
2014	Parking	Sarah	
2015	Hiker	Brooke Ferrio	
2016	Ctrl Alt Delete	Lex	
2016	The Wedding Party	Lisa	
2017	Mommy I Didn't Do It	Gail Saverin	
2017	Shattered	Kate Stinson	

=== Television ===
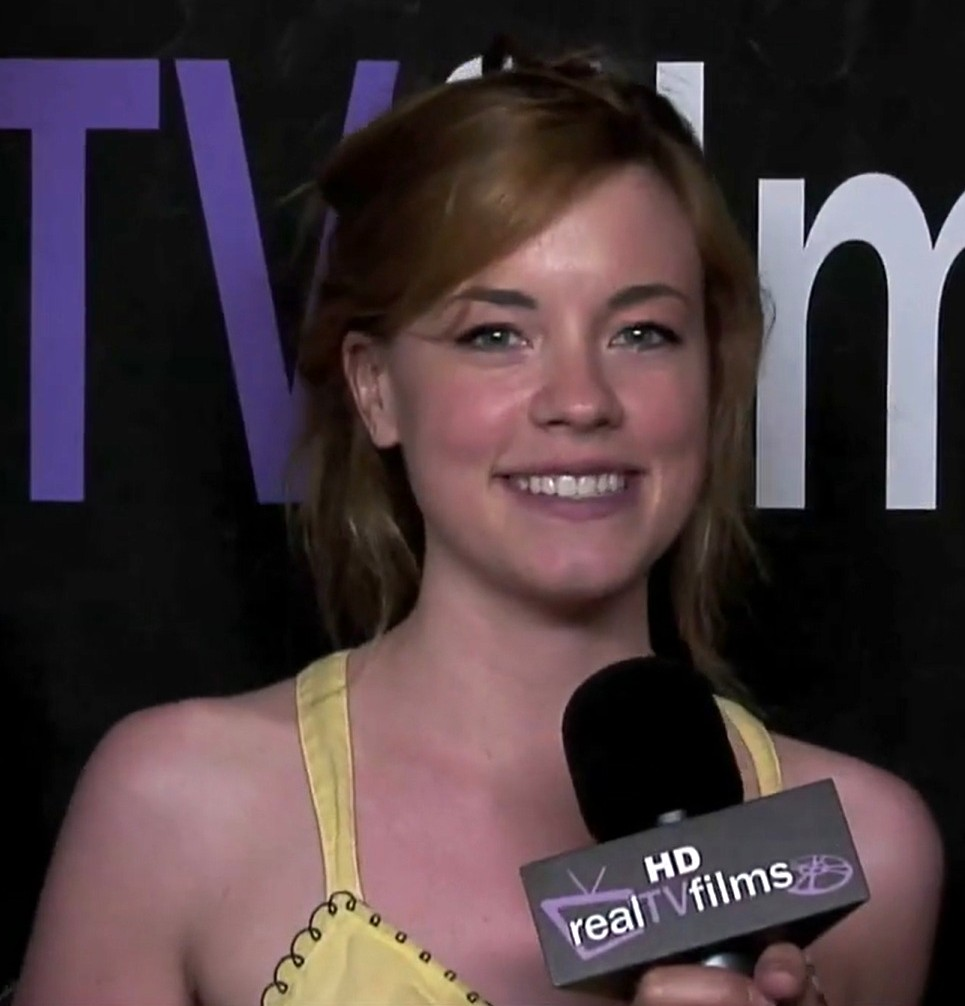
Burnett in 2009

List of television roles and appearances
Year	Title	Role	Notes
2007	Life	Josie	Episode: "Serious Control Issues"
2008–2012, 2014–2016	Days of Our Lives	Melanie Layton Kiriakis Jonas	Main role
2009	True Blood	Amanda Jane	Episode: "Keep This Party Going"
2010	Good Luck Charlie	Madison	Episode: "Boys Meet Girls"
2011–2012	Venice: The Series	Sarah	Main role; web series
2012	CSI: NY	Molly Byrne	Episode: "Slainte"
2012	Cameras	Molly	Main role; web series
2013	Zach Stone Is Gonna Be Famous	Deb	Episode: "Zach Stone Is Gonna Be The Zacthelor"
2013	Major Crimes	Kim Riley	Episode: "Jailbait"
2013	This Magic Moment	Justine Gable	Television film
2013	Addicts Anonymous	Haley Meyers	Main role; web series
2013, 2015	Jessie	Darla Shannon	Episodes: "GI Jessie", "A Close Shave"
2015	Longmire	Sarah	Episode: "Four Arrows"
2016, 2018	General Hospital	Maxie Jones	Temporary replacement; 11 episodes
2016–2017	Relationship Status	Laura	Episodes: "The Good Guy", "The Match", "The Ring Bearer"
2015–2016	CSI: Cyber	Nina Moore	Recurring role; 4 episodes
2017–2021	Queen of the South	Kelly Anne Van Awken	Recurring role; 21 episodes
2018	The Lover in the Attic: A True Story	Dolly Oesterreich	Television film
2022	Chicago P.D.	Raquel Landry	Episode: "Fool's Gold"
2022–2023	Law & Order: Special Victims Unit	Detective Grace Muncy	Main role
2023	Law & Order: Organized Crime	Detective Grace Muncy	Episode: "With Many Names"
2025	9-1-1	Lori	Episodes: “The Sky Is Falling”, “Reentry”
2026	Criminal Minds: Evolution	Cora Sault	Episode: “Proxy”

=== Music videos ===
- "Give Me Your Hand" (2018), by Shannon K

== Awards and nominations ==
List of awards and nominations received by Molly Burnett
Award	Year	Category	Work	Result	Ref.
Daytime Emmy Award	2010	Outstanding Younger Actress in a Drama Series	Days of Our Lives	Nominated	
Daytime Emmy Award	2012	Outstanding Younger Actress in a Drama Series	Days of Our Lives	Nominated	
Daytime Emmy Award	2018	Outstanding Supporting Actress in a Digital Daytime Drama Series	Relationship Status	Nominated	
