= Orbitel (Bulgarian company) =

Orbitel, Inc
- Company type: limited liability company
- Industry: telecommunications
- Founded: 1997
- Headquarters: Sofia, Bulgaria
- Products: Internet services, Virtual private networks, ADSL, fixed telephony, carrier selection, web hosting, corporative e-mail
- Revenue: ▼€9.85 million (2008)
- Number of employees: 126 (December, 2008)
- Website: http://www.orbitel.bg

Orbitel (Bulgarian: Орбител) is a Bulgarian wireline telecommunications and Internet service provider with national licenses for voice and data. Through its national packet-switched network Orbitel provides convergent telecommunication solutions for telephony, high speed Internet and VPNs throughout Bulgaria. Orbitel also provides services such as web site hosting, domain registration, corporate e-mail and professional consultations.

Orbitel was founded in 1997 by entrepreneurs Victor Francess and Nikolai Gorchilov, who served as board members and CEOs until 2007.

== Investors ==
=== European Bank for Reconstruction and Development ===
In 2001 The European Bank for Reconstruction and Development chose Orbitel to make the first foreign investment in the Bulgarian IT sector. The company becomes one of the biggest Bulgarian Internet service providers.

=== Magyar Telekom ===
In February 2006 Orbitel became part of the leading Hungarian operator Magyar Telekom. In November 2009, Magyar Telekom decided to exit the Bulgarian alternative retail telecommunication business and focus its operations on businesses where it sees more lucrative prospects.

=== Spectrum Net ===
In November 2009 Spectrum Net, part of Alfa Finance Holding, decided to purchase the shares from Magyar Telekom.

== Network ==
Orbitel introduced the first next generation telecommunication platform in Southeastern Europe. The company introduced the softswitch based technology for convergent voice, data and video, proven by operators such as France Telecom, Telefonica, FastWeb and Tiscali.

Orbitel's network backbone is based on MPLS technology and covers more than 35 cities, among which are all the district centers in Bulgaria and the European telecommunication center London.. Till the end of 2009 Orbitel used own national fiber network built on DWDM technology, part of long-term strategy of the company for development as a key broadband operator in Bulgaria. The backbone network of Orbitel has capacity of 10 Gbit/second and covers 23 cities in the country (90% of the population).
