= Orbitel (Colombian company) =

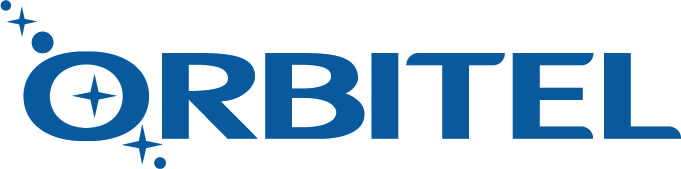
- Company type: Public
- Industry: Telecommunications
- Founded: Medellín, Colombia (1998)
- Headquarters: Medellín, Antioquia, Colombia
- Area served: Medellín, Colombia; Miami, Florida, USA; New York City, USA; Canada; Spain
- Products: Long-distance calling Stored-value card Wholesale Solutions.
- Number of employees: 500
- Website: www.orbitel.com

Orbitel was the international business unit of UNE EPM Telecomunicaciones, a leading telecommunications company in Colombia. Orbitel is present in more than 20 states of the United States and Canada (through its subsidiary Cinco Telecom Corp. ), and in Spain (under the name of Orbitel Comunicaciones Latinoamericanas S.A.U.). Orbitel provides a large array of services to serve the needs of Latin Americans abroad such as prepaid services, long distance plans, virtual numbers, international top-ups and carrier class traffic termination services.

== History ==
Around the mid 1990s, the Colombian telecommunications industry was liberalized, which was followed by the entrance of several independent telecommunications providers. In 1998, a group of investors (led by Santo Domingo and Sarmiento Angulo) joined EPM to incorporate Orbitel, company born to provide long-distance telecommunications services inside Colombia and worldwide.

In 2006, Orbitel bids and wins the right to a governmental license to operate the promising WiMAX technology, starting to provide its service that same year in the city of Cali.

In the context of the increased rivalry in the Colombian telecommunications industry (due to the entry of Movistar Móviles Colombia, Claro and América Móvil), EPM spins off its telecommunications business in an independent new venture. To achieve a more competitive position in the long distance market and to make good use of the newly gained WiMAX license of Orbitel, EPM buys the 50% of the company that still rests in the hands of the Santo Domingo's and Sarmiento Angulo's holdings.

The following year, the 1st of August 2007, EPM Telecomunicaciones, Orbitel and Emelco's telecommunications business merge into a single company under the umbrella of the brand UNE.

From the very beginning of its history, UNE tries to blend together the different brands that made up the group. Already in 2007, UNE tries to homogenize the logos and the culture of all of its brands under the slogan: “una marca UNE”. That same year, UNE takes over the Colombian business from Orbitel, which leaves Orbitel as an international services provider for the Latin Americans abroad in the United States and Spain.

== International Presence ==
In the United States and Canada. Orbitel incorporates its subsidiary in USA in the year 2000, opening its first corporate venue in Miami, closely followed by the opening of the New York office. The American subsidiary also offers its services to Orbitel's clients in Canada. Orbitel's flagship product, “the Colombia Card”, has become the most frequently used card among Colombians in the United States.

In Spain. Orbitel starts providing service to Latin Americans in Spain in the year 2004 through its pre-paid card “Orbitel Latina”. Currently, Orbitel operates in Spain through a mobile virtual network thanks to the agreement reached with Vodafone in 2009, which grants Orbitel access to Vizzavi's infrastructures in Spain.
