= David Graziano =

American dramatist

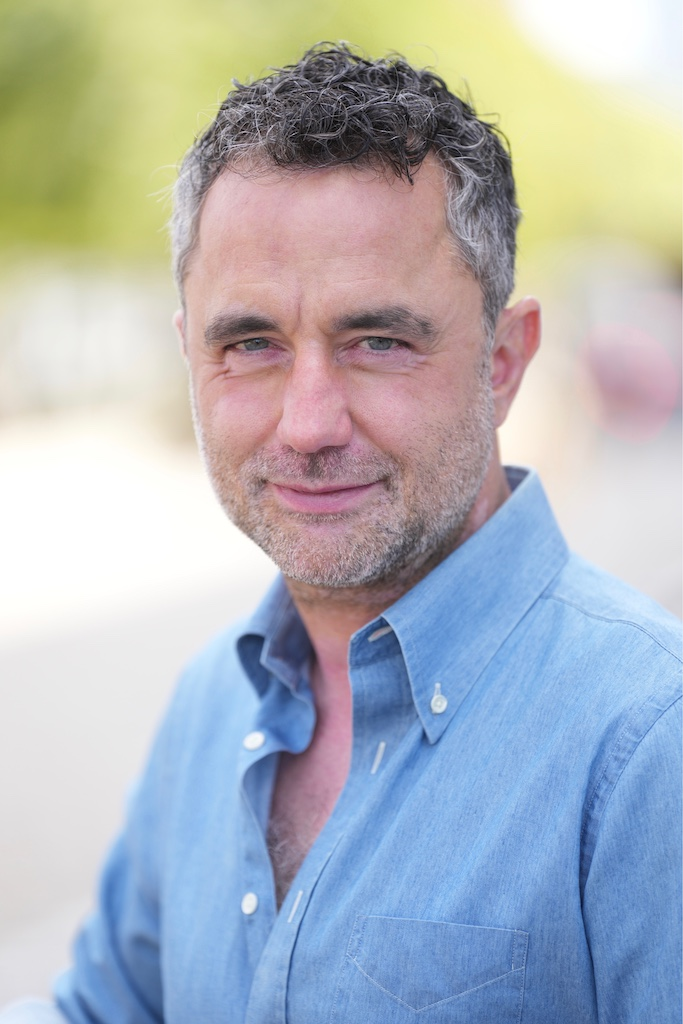
- Born: Brooklyn, New York, U.S.
- Education: New York University
- Occupations: Television Producer and Writer
- Years active: 1998–present

David Graziano is an American television writer, producer and award-winning playwright born in New York. His career began when Acorn, one of his plays, was produced and performed at the Humana Festival in Louisville, Kentucky in 1998.

After being interviewed on National Public Radio, he was invited by J. J. Abrams to write on his television show Felicity.

Since then, Graziano has written for numerous broadcast and cable dramatic television series, including In Plain Sight, Lie to Me, Southland, the Neil Gaiman adaptation American Gods, and Tom Clancy’s Jack Ryan in an Executive Producer capacity. Most recently, Graziano was the co-creator, Executive Producer and Showrunner of the CBS All Access drama Coyote, directed by Emmy award-winning director Michelle MacLaren and starring Emmy and Golden Globe winner Michael Chiklis. His pilot "$alvage", developed under the auspices of Cobra Kai creators at Counterbalance Entertainment is presently in development at Sony Pictures Entertainment, in addition to an untitled cop show set in 1970s-era New York with SK Global.

In June 2022, he was named the new showrunner of Law & Order: Special Victims Unit, starting with its twenty fourth season.
