= Cold (Law & Order: Special Victims Unit) =

- Law & Order: Special Victims Unit episode
- Episode no.: Season 9 Episode 19
- Directed by: David Platt
- Written by: Judith McCreary
- Production code: 09019
- Original air date: May 13, 2008

Guest appearances
- Deirdre Lovejoy as Penelope Fielding; Victoria Cartagena as Cecelia Cruz; Jack Gwaltney as Thomas Crane; Brian Tarantina as Bill Jensen; Arthur Gerunda as Inspector; Mike Doyle as CSU Tech Ryan O'Halloran; Joanna Merlin as Judge Lena Petrovsky; Robert Turano as Wesley Meadows; Caren Browning as Judith Siper; Viola Davis as Donna Emmett; Special guest appearance by: Judith Light as Judge Elizabeth Donnelly

Episode chronology
← Previous "Trade"	Next → "Trials"
- Law & Order: Special Victims Unit season 9

"Cold" is the nineteenth episode and season finale of the ninth season of the police procedural television series Law & Order: Special Victims Unit and the 202nd episode overall. It originally aired on NBC in the United States on May 13, 2008. In the episode, Detective Chester Lake (Adam Beach) refuses to cooperate after fatally shooting a police officer during a gunfight, causing the Special Victims Unit squad to investigate what he is hiding. The investigation and subsequent trial lead to Assistant District Attorney Casey Novak facing censure and Detective Tutuola (Ice-T) requesting a transfer out of the Special Victims Unit.

The episode was written by Judith McCreary and was directed by David Platt. It marks the final appearance of Adam Beach, who had portrayed Detective Lake since the end of the eighth season and decided to depart the cast towards the end of the ninth. His character is arrested for shooting a police officer after discovering the officer is about to be acquitted for a rape he committed ten years ago. It also marks the final appearance of Diane Neal (ADA Casey Novak) as a series regular after five seasons; her character is censured for lying to a judge about evidence.

According to Nielsen ratings, the episode's original broadcast was watched by 11.81 million viewers and acquired a 4.0 rating / 11% share in the 18–49 demographic.

== Plot ==
An old murder case of a teenage girl is reopened when Detective Chester Lake is caught in a gunfight and wounded by the case's former investigator, Detective Edward Kralik. The shooting leaves Kralik dead, and Lake's uncooperative answers lead to confusion in the squad room. The case intensifies when Lake escapes from the hospital and takes hostage the original case's only witness, Cecilia Cruz (Victoria Cartagena).

The SVU squad is left to revisit the original murder case, as Detectives Benson (Mariska Hargitay) and Stabler (Christopher Meloni) search for Lake and his hostage. Tutuola (Ice-T) threatens to leave the squad after Stabler searches his cell phone records, thinking Tutuola is Lake's accomplice. The case ultimately causes Novak (Diane Neal) to violate due process while prosecuting the case.

ADA Novak is called to Judge Donnelly's (Judith Light) chambers and is informed that the district attorney had declined to refile charges against defendant Thomas Crane (Jack Gwaltney), and that Novak would be facing censure or indefinite suspension by the bar association. Novak then answers a message that she has just received and leaves the office.

That night, Lake has fatally shot Thomas Crane, which ultimately leads to his arrest, leaving Novak and the SVU detectives in shock. The assembled group watch, as Lake is taken away by officers. Lake solemnly looks at his former colleagues while he is loaded up in the car that drives off.

== Production ==
"Cold" was written by Judith McCreary and directed by David Platt.

In April 2008, it was first announced that Diane Neal who portrayed Assistant District Attorney Casey Novak since the fifth season would abruptly depart the cast. An SVU spokesperson confirmed the actress' departure to TV Guide, saying, "Diane spent five years on SVU and was a tremendous addition to the SVU team. She is looking forward to new opportunities and she will be missed." But as soon as it was announced Neal had departed the cast, it was said that she was fired from the show. This came about shortly after TV Guide broke the news of Neal's departure. Michael Ausiello of TV Guide noted that a show insider says an emotional Neal gathered the crew together on the set and informed them that she had just been fired.

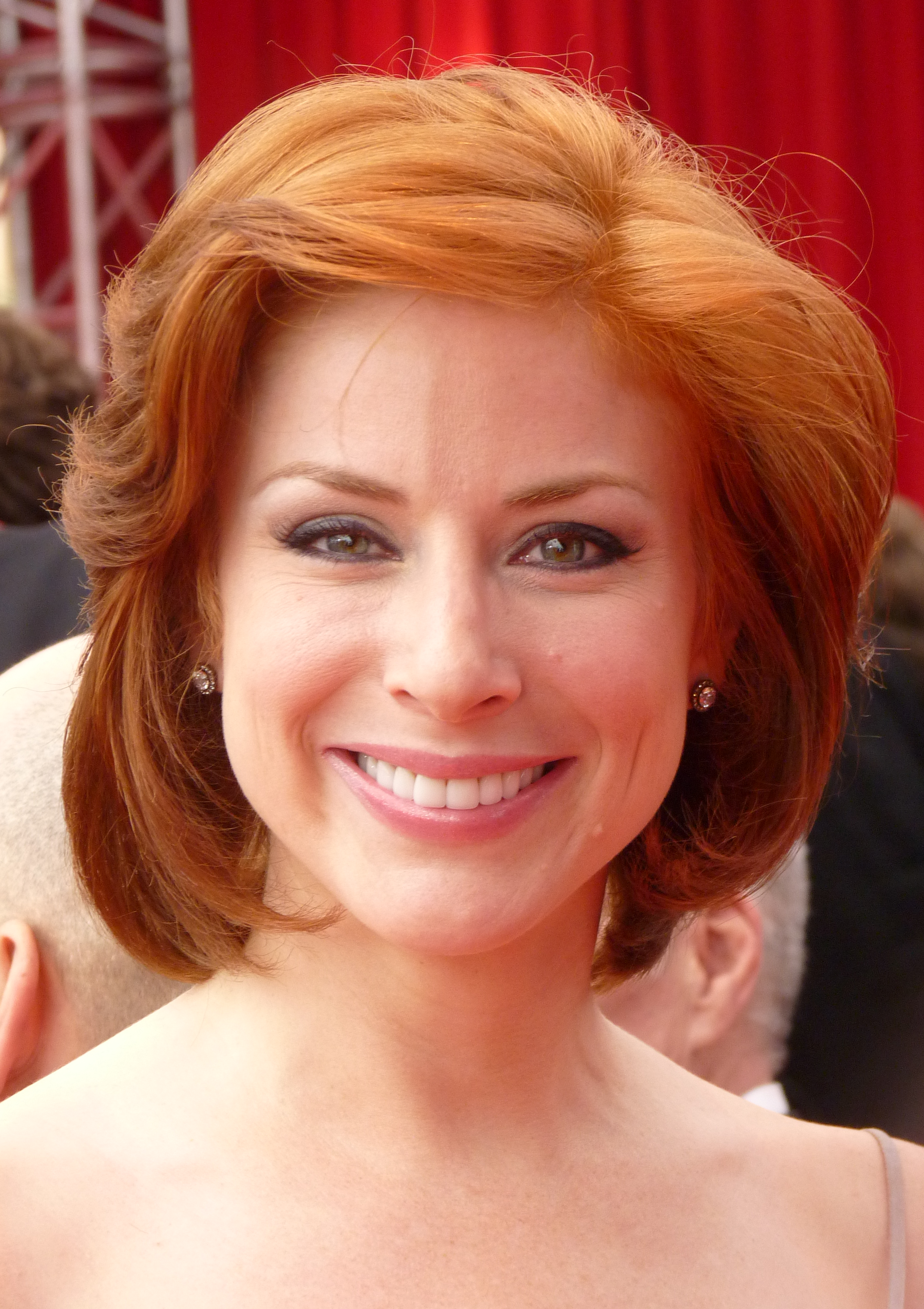
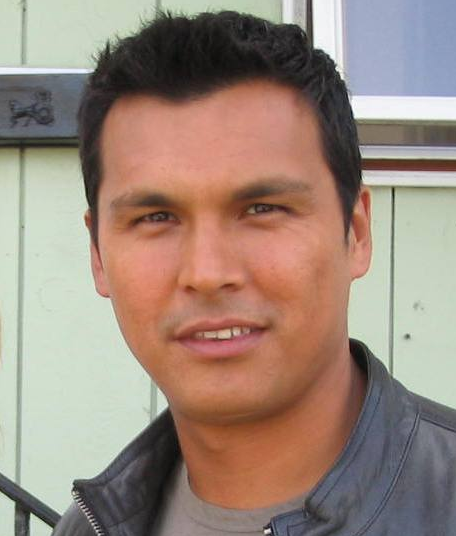
Diane Neal (left) was brought back to the series at the end of the twelfth season and in a recurring role throughout the thirteenth season. With Adam Beach (right) on the cast, the series was more "ensemble"; Beach's character primarily partnered with Ice-T's Tutuola, but was often seen partnered with Mariska Hargitay's Olivia Benson.

While Neal confirms that she "did talk to the crew" about her departure, she declined to say whether she used "the F-word". "Rumors are rumors," Neal said. "I love the crew. The crew loves me. We've really gotten along and bonded over these past five years. And they're always looking out for me and watching my back." Asked if she was blindsided by the news, Neal, choosing her words carefully, responded, "I don't know if blindsided is the right word.... I've lasted longer by several years than almost any other ADA [in the Law & Order universe]. So every year I've been like, 'Is this going to be the one when I leave?' Dick Wolf is known for replacing his cast regularly. And the truth is, I'm really looking forward to the future."

Allison Waldman of AOL TV was not happy about Neal's SVU departure, "Unlike so many of the faces and forms that come in and out of the L&O universe, Diane Neal stuck out. And I mean that in a good way. She had a presence and a passion, which was not only recognizable amid the many others who seem interchangeable, it was crucial to match fire with Christopher Meloni, Mariska Hargitay and the other SVU cast."

Neal was not the only cast member to depart: Adam Beach, who joined the cast at the beginning of the ninth season to portray Detective Chester Lake, was departing the cast. Series creator Dick Wolf sounded sanguine about Beach's departure, calling him a "superb actor." Wolf said, "He did a terrific job this season on 'SVU', and I look forward to working with him again in the near future." Beach joined Law & Order: SVU on the heels of his starring role in Dick Wolf's Emmy-winning HBO film Bury My Heart at Wounded Knee, which earned the actor a Golden Globe nomination. "I very much enjoyed my year on Law & Order: SVU," Beach said. "Now I'm looking forward to new adventures." Beach also guest-starred in two eighth season episodes as Detective Lake, "Outsider" and "Screwed", prior to fully joining the cast.

For season 10, Dick Wolf wanted to search for a new character to replace Novak. In season 10, she is temporarily replaced by Assistant District Attorney Kim Greylek portrayed by Michaela McManus until Stephanie March returns as ADA Alexandra Cabot. There was no replacement for Beach's Detective Lake.

== Reception ==
=== Ratings ===
In its original NBC broadcast (May 13, 2008), "Cold" ended its broadcast with 11.81 million viewers after reaching 10.83 during the first half of the episode. NBC won the 10pm hour with the season finale of Law & Order: SVU and the age 18-49 audience. It started with a 3.5 rating / 9% share in the demographic and increased to a 4.0 rating / 11% share. Overall SVU averaged a 3.8 in the demographic vs. a 2.1 for Women's Murder Club on ABC and a 2.1 for a rerun of Criminal Minds on CBS.
