= Law & Order: Special Victims Unit season 9 =

Season of American television series

Law & Order: Special Victims Unit
- Season 9
- Season 9 U.S. DVD cover
- Starring: Christopher Meloni; Mariska Hargitay; Richard Belzer; Diane Neal; Ice-T; Adam Beach; BD Wong; Tamara Tunie; Dann Florek
- No. of episodes: 19

Release
- Original network: NBC
- Original release: September 25, 2007 – May 13, 2008

Season chronology
- ← Previous; Season 8 Next → Season 10

The ninth season of the police procedural/legal drama, Law & Order: Special Victims Unit premiered September 25, 2007 and ended May 13, 2008 on NBC. It aired on Tuesday nights at 10pm/9c. Mariska Hargitay, having won a Golden Globe Award in 2005, received her second Golden Globe nomination for her work in the ninth season.

== Production ==
Showrunner/executive producer Neal Baer was more hands-on in the ninth season of SVU writing episodes "Alternate" and "Authority". The last episode crediting Baer as the primary writer was the seventh season episode "Storm". Multiple episodes of the ninth season dealt openly with the abortion debate. A 2008 article for Newsday that criticized American media for avoiding any mention of abortion called Law & Order: SVU the "one exception... willing to take such risks." This season of SVU also coincided with the 2007 Writers Guild of America strike for which Neal Baer served on the negotiating committee. With all of the writing staff participating in the strike, episodes stopped airing for nearly three whole months after the January 22, 2008 episode "Inconceivable".

With Geoffrey Erb having left during the previous season, George Pattison became the show's director of photography. When discussing the visuals in Season 9, Neal Baer said "Last year, we were too dark; we want better lighting."

== Cast changes and returning characters ==
The first episode "Alternate" reveals that Richard Belzer's character, Detective John Munch, passed the sergeant's exam. As a result, other characters begin to refer to him as Sergeant John Munch. Season 9 dramatically reduced the amount of screen time given to Richard Belzer and the following seasons of SVU continued to do the same. When commenting on the reduction in his workload, Belzer said he was "a bit mystified" and that "It's like yanking the tonsils out of the gift horse if I complain too much."

Towards the end of the season, it was announced that Diane Neal (ADA Casey Novak) was departing the cast and days later it was said that she was fired from the series. Asked if she was blindsided by the news, Neal responded "I don't know if blindsided is the right word.... I've lasted longer by several years than almost any other ADA [in the Law & Order universe]. So every year I've been like, 'Is this going to be the one when I leave?' Dick Wolf is known for replacing his cast regularly. And the truth is, I'm really looking forward to the future."

Adam Beach fully joined the cast as Detective Chester Lake, who had already appeared twice on the show. A plan announced by Neal Baer in February 2007 was to portray the detective as a special victim himself. This was fulfilled in the episode "Fight", which reveals that Lake was a foster child. However, days after Diane Neal's departure was announced, Adam Beach announced that he was departing the cast as well. "I very much enjoyed my year on Law & Order: SVU," Beach said. "Now I'm looking forward to new adventures."

== Cast ==
=== Main ===
- Christopher Meloni as Detective Elliot Stabler
- Mariska Hargitay as Detective Olivia Benson
- Richard Belzer as Detective / Sergeant John Munch
- Diane Neal as Assistant District Attorney Casey Novak
- Ice-T as Detective Odafin "Fin" Tutuola
- Adam Beach as Detective Chester Lake
- BD Wong as FBI Special Agent Dr. George Huang
- Tamara Tunie as Medical Examiner Dr. Melinda Warner
- Dann Florek as Captain Donald "Don" Cragen

=== Crossover stars from Law & Order ===
- Sam Waterston as District Attorney Jack McCoy

=== Recurring cast ===
- Caren Browning as Crime Scene Unit Captain Judith Siper
- Beverly D'Angelo as Defense Attorney Rebecca Balthus
- Mike Doyle as Crime Scene Unit Forensics Technician Ryan O'Halloran
- Joel de la Fuente as Technical Assistance Response Unit Technician Ruben Morales
- Isabel Gillies as Kathy Stabler
- Anne James as Dr. Jane Larom
- Patricia Kalember as Judge Karen Taten
- Deep Katdare as Dr. Parnell
- David Lipman as Judge Arthur Cohen
- Austin Lysy as Defense Attorney Russell Hunter
- Peter McRobbie as Judge Walter Bradley
- Joanna Merlin as Judge Lena Petrovsky
- Audrie J. Neenan as Judge Lois Preston
- John Schuck as Chief of Detectives Muldrew
- Steven Weber as Defense Attorney Matthew Braden
- Julia White as Dr. Anne Morella

=== Guest stars ===
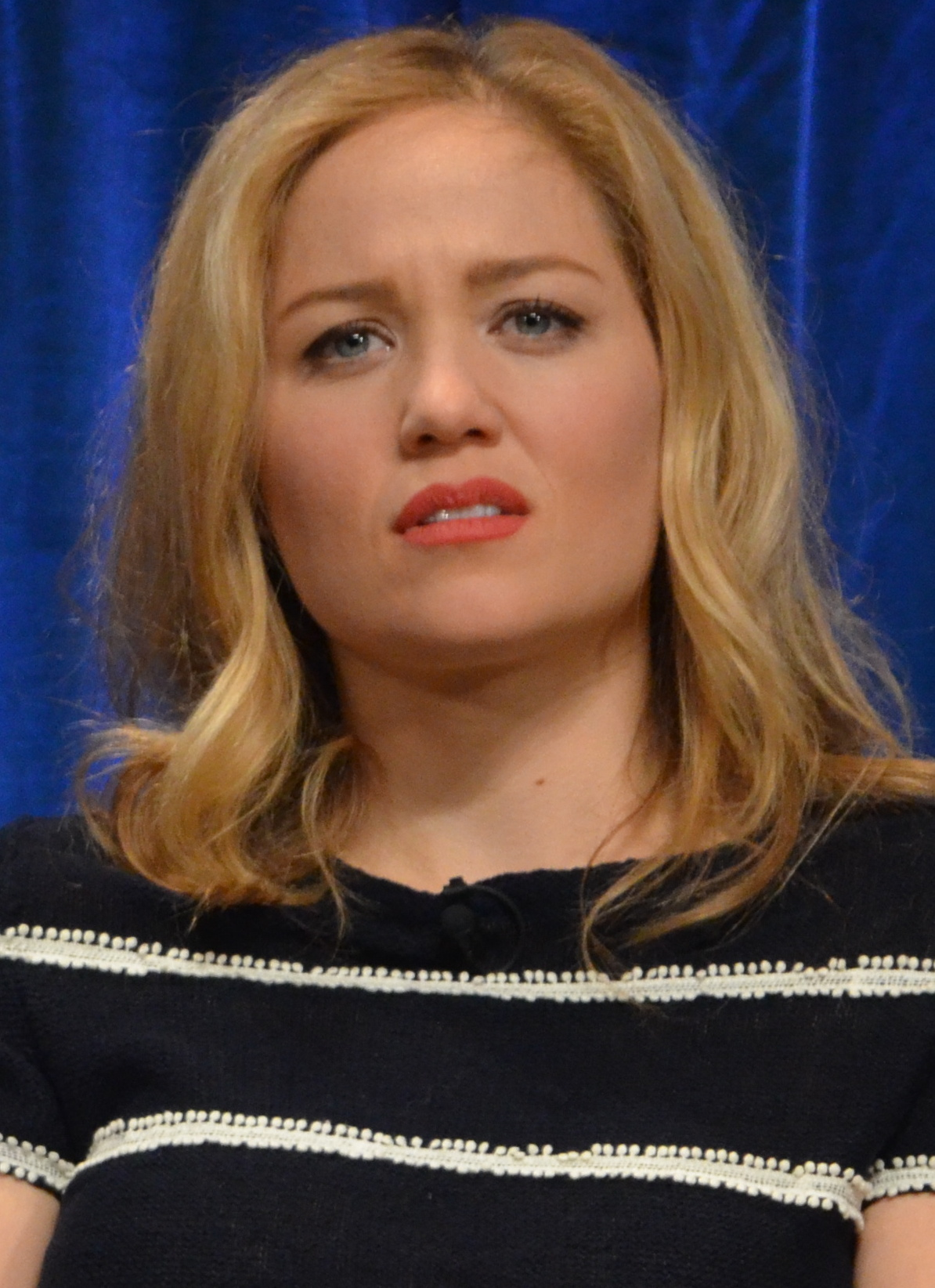
Erika Christensen's character Agent Lauren Cooper reaches a tragic conclusion in the episode "Signature".

Cynthia Nixon guest starred in the season premiere "Alternate" as Janis Donovan, a woman with multiple personalities. Nixon described it by saying "I read all about multiple personalities — it was such a juicy part!" This role won her a Primetime Emmy Award for Outstanding Guest Actress in a Drama Series. Nixon had previously appeared in the second ever episode of Law & Order, in 1991. Bronson Pinchot starred as her psychiatrist. He talked about working with Meloni and Hargitay and described them as "the most welcoming stars of any show I've ever guested on." For the show's 200th episode "Authority", Robin Williams guest starred as an engineer who tries to teach the public a lesson using extreme methods. Williams was nominated for a Primetime Emmy Award for Outstanding Guest Actor in a Drama Series. In an interview about casting, Neal Baer stated that the most famous guest stars used by the show play roles that were written with them in mind. He mentioned Cynthia Nixon and Robin Williams as examples and said that the details of their stories were only written after it was known that they would be available.

Kevin Tighe guest starred as a kidnapper and rapist in the episode "Avatar" which was well received by gamers. The detectives make use of a virtual world similar to Second Life to hunt down his character. In the same episode, reporter David Keeps, who is a friend of Mariska Hargitay, briefly appeared as an unnamed detective. Keeps wrote that he only went to the SVU set for a visit until Hargitay arranged to have him written into the scene at the last minute. The third episode "Impulsive" guest starred Melissa Joan Hart as a teacher and Kyle Gallner as her student in a "he said, she said" rape case. The episode began filming in April 2007 making it the first episode of the ninth season produced.

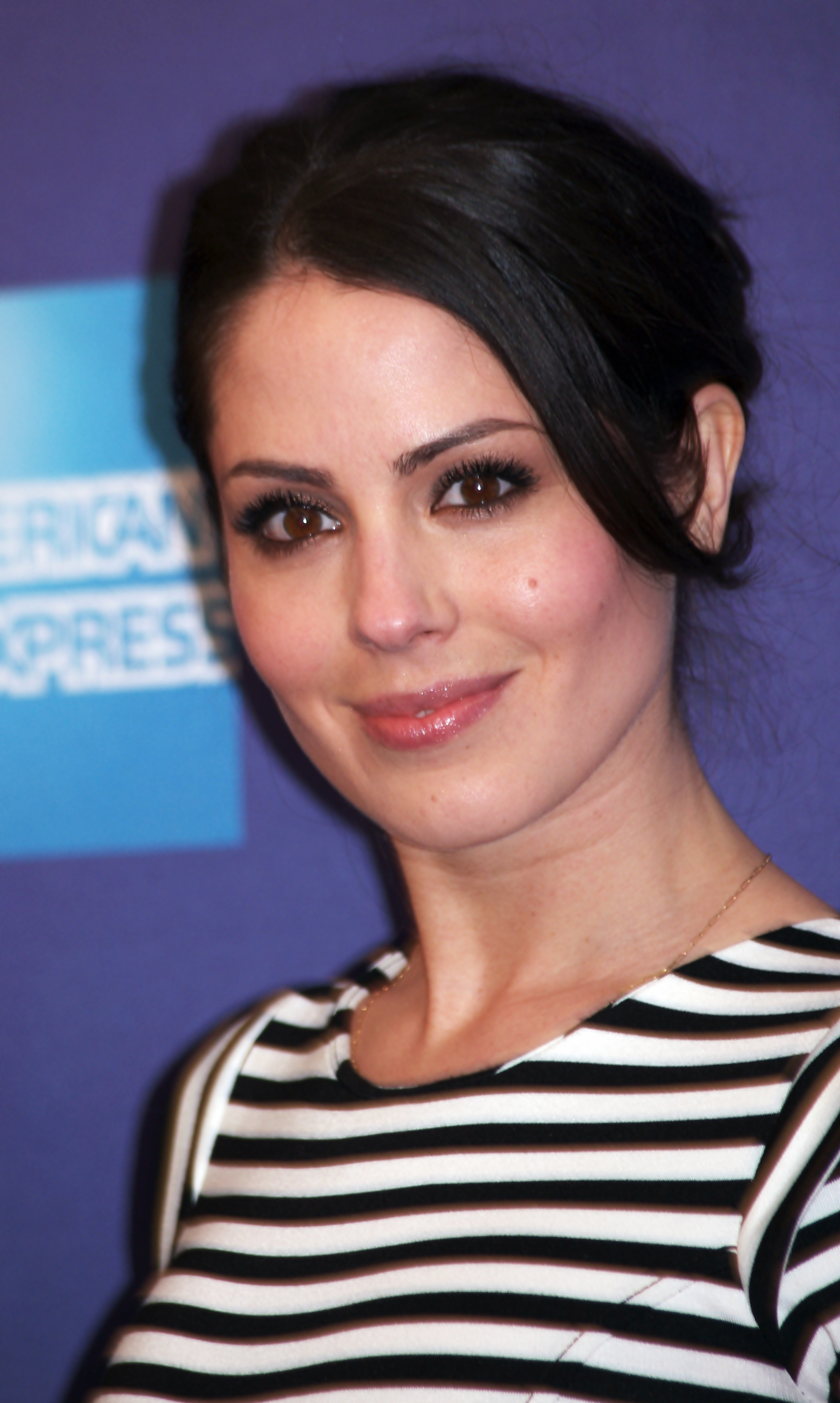
In "Trade", Michelle Borth played Avery Hemmings, a lawyer who knows more about the case she is trying than she lets on.

In "Savant", a child played by Paulina Gerzon becomes the key to solving a case when the SVU learns about her extremely sensitive hearing. Children's author Robert Black praised SVU's ability to find good child actors and said that Gerzon "was fantastic as a girl with Williams syndrome, even having to deliver her lines through a set of oversized false teeth." This episode also showed Vincent Spano reprising his role as FBI Agent Dean Porter. In "Harm", Elizabeth McGovern played Dr. Faith Sutton, a doctor who feels it is her duty to help the war on terror by teaching torture techniques. When talking about this issue, Neal Baer explained "I don't think they should, but I think it's more interesting if we hear Elizabeth McGovern's perspective and say 'I have a son and how are we going to stop this?' and we have a complicated, interesting, deep discussion through our characters. The same interview brought up a line spoken by Elliot Stabler in "Harm" that was critical of invasive interrogations. Baer said that Christopher Meloni requested this line to help keep his character three-dimensional. The episode "Blinded" commented on the Kennedy v. Louisiana debate about punishing child rape with the death penalty. Sam Waterston made an appearance as his Law & Order character, DA Jack McCoy. Since the eighteenth season of Law & Order had yet to air at this point, this was the first time that Jack McCoy appeared as the DA rather than an EADA.

The episode "Fight" featured guest appearances by UFC fighters Forrest Griffin and Renzo Gracie. Nicole "Coco" Austin also appeared and had a scene with her husband Ice-T. This marked their first acting appearance together even though Coco had appeared on SVU once before. Mark Valley guest starred in the following episode "Paternity" as a father who is shocked to learn that his child is not related to him. Bruce Fretts of TV Guide said he "got more dramatic meat to chew in an hour than he's had in three years on Boston Legal." This episode additionally deals with the birth of Elliot Stabler's fifth child and was submitted as an Emmy bid episode for Christopher Meloni. Olivia Benson finds herself in a situation in which she must help to deliver the baby and Elliot Stabler hugs her as a way of saying thank you. This was not in the script but Meloni insisted on it while the scene was filmed saying "Guys, I have to hug her."

Shareeka Epps made her first television appearance in the dark episode "Undercover" starring as a terrified rape victim who is assaulted by a prison guard. The episode was filmed in a real prison. In "Closet", Bill Pullman starred as Kurt Moss, a reporter in a short-lived relationship with Olivia Benson. As a way of complimenting Pullman, Neal Baer joked that "Benson finally has a boyfriend, and he was well worth the wait." The second last episode "Trade" starred Stephen Collins and Matthew Davis as Pearson Bartlett Sr and Jr, a pair of coffee magnates who come under suspicion in a woman's murder. When asked if he enjoyed being on SVU, Collins tweeted "yes, but the role was difficult." This was followed by the fast-paced season finale "Cold".

== Episodes ==
Law & Order: Special Victims Unit season 9 episodes
No. overall	No. in season	Title	Directed by	Written by	Original release date	Prod. code	U.S. viewers (millions)
184	1	"Alternate"	David Platt	Neal Baer & Dawn DeNoon	September 25, 2007	0903	12.12
A woman (Cynthia Nixon) who switches between five different personalities is suspected of harming her daughter. The investigation is met with initial resistance from her psychiatrist (Bronson Pinchot). When the woman's sister (Laura Allen) is released from jail, their parents are found murdered the next day and the two of them become the prime suspects.: Partially inspired by the Lyle and Erik Menendez case and the film Sybil.
185	2	"Avatar"	Peter Leto	Paul Grellong	October 2, 2007	0904	11.62
A girl who plays virtual world games (Christina Brucato) goes missing. Her boyfriend (Ryan Lynn), a suspect in the case, is discovered to suffer from sexsomnia which caused him to attempt to rape her sister (Liza Joyce). In an effort to locate the girl, Detectives Benson and Stabler use her avatar to track her kidnapper (Kevin Tighe) down.
186	3	"Impulsive"	David Platt	Jonathan Greene	October 9, 2007	0901	12.30
A statutory rape case against a high school teacher (Melissa Joan Hart) is filed after gonorrhea is discovered in one of her students (Kyle Gallner). The teacher tries to secretly have an abortion which angers her husband (Quincy Dunn-Baker) and gets her accused of destroying evidence. However, after observing the student more closely, the SVU realizes that he is a sex addict who hires prostitutes, photoshops scantily-clad women and masturbates with high frequency. He confesses to raping his teacher and, after being diagnosed of having compulsive sexual behaviour disorder, is sent to a rehabilitation clinic. The situation changes gears when the student is raped by a much older sex offender (David Conley), exposing ongoing problems at the clinic and insanity defenses.
187	4	"Savant"	Kate Woods	Judith McCreary	October 16, 2007	0905	12.51
A government agent (Aidan Quinn) discovers that his daughter (Paulina Gerzon), who has Williams syndrome, is the only witness to the savage beating of his wife (Judy Kuhn). Even though the investigation is impeded by the man's superiors (Jayne Atkinson), Detectives Benson and Stabler and ADA Novak work with his daughter to reconstruct the night the beating took place. Her testimony is able to clear one suspect (Robert Clohessy), who also has a mentally challenged son and implicate his older son (Josh Barclay Caras).
188	5	"Harm"	Peter Leto	Josh Singer	October 23, 2007	0902	12.31
The detectives investigate the fatal stabbing of a private school teacher (Elizabeth Morton), who had volunteered at a victim's rehabilitation center. The teacher had been working with an Iraqi man (Jarreth J. Merz) whose story helped uncover some military secrets. The investigation leads to a doctor (Elizabeth McGovern) who works for private military contractors focusing on interrogation techniques. Melinda Warner tries to have her medical license revoked for violating the Hippocratic Oath.
189	6	"Svengali"	David Platt	Kam Miller	November 6, 2007	0906	11.70
A college student is found murdered in an attack that bears the hallmarks of an infamous serial killer (Jared Harris). Detectives Benson and Stabler question the killer and discover his loyal following, which includes a comic book artist (Gareth Saxe) who glorifies the murders. When the last person (Shannon Marie Woodward) to see the victim alive goes missing, the detectives search for her, thinking that she is about to become the next victim. Benson also finds herself in danger when the fans retaliate against the investigation.
190	7	"Blinded"	David Platt	Jonathan Greene	November 13, 2007	0909	12.48
Detective Stabler is attacked and temporarily blinded when arresting a child molester (Arye Gross) who suffers from schizophrenia. Disturbed by what has been done to her partner, Detective Benson tries to sabotage New York's case against the man and have him put on death row in Louisiana instead. Due to her own conflict of interest, ADA Novak tries to bend the rules in the opposite direction and have the man acquitted. The situation is resolved when the District Attorney reminds Novak that executing a mentally ill prisoner is illegal and threatens to pull her license unless she acts as a voice for the prosecution. The schizophrenic is sent to a New York mental hospital and Benson admits that her interference almost caused a miscarriage of justice.: Special appearance by Sam Waterston as DA Jack McCoy.
191	8	"Fight"	Juan J. Campanella	Mick Betancourt	November 20, 2007	0907	11.69
A brutal murder leads the detectives into the dangerous world of unsanctioned mixed martial arts. Detective Lake discovers two troubled brothers (Gaius Charles and Arlen Escarpeta) who have been in and out of the foster care system. The brothers admit that they were told to rape the girl (Whitney Vance) in order to enter a gang. The case gets harder when the leader of the gang and prime suspect (Anwan Glover) is accidentally crushed to death in a trash compactor and one of the brothers lies to protect the other.
192	9	"Paternity"	Kate Woods	Amanda Green	November 27, 2007	0910	12.29
The murder of a young boy (Thomas Langston)'s nanny leads Detectives Benson and Stabler to suspect her Internet love interest, "Casanova" (Steven Bauer). However, the nanny's employers (Mark Valley and Anastasia Griffith) soon get troubles of their own when the father finds out that his son is not his biological son. Stabler's family suffers a tragedy leaving his unborn child in serious danger after Benson and Kathy are hurt in a car accident.
193	10	"Snitch"	Jonathan Kaplan	Mark Goffman	December 4, 2007	0908	11.73
Detectives Benson and Stabler investigate when the wife of an informant (Hakeem Kae-Kazim) is found dead. The man is revealed to be a Nigerian polygamist with several wives still living, one of whom (Tracy Middendorf) is not Nigerian. Benson and Stabler suspect that the man's cultural tradition may have been the cause of his wife's murder when they find a website that exposes potential witnesses to the crime for which he was testifying. A new Homicide Bureau Chief ADA (Gloria Reuben) has to try to keep her case from falling apart after the husband refuses to testify against the killer (Method Man) of a young boy.
194	11	"Streetwise"	Helen Shaver	Paul Grellong	January 1, 2008	0913	12.35
The SVU squad members are called in when a wealthy teenager (Natalie Hall) is found murdered in Central Park. Suspicion soon falls on the "parents" (Mae Whitman and Thom Bishops) in a homeless street family. A young girl (Madeline Taylor) agrees to give information about them to Benson and Stabler in exchange for food but it is not long before she is found murdered as well.
195	12	"Signature"	Arthur W. Forney	Judith McCreary	January 8, 2008	0911	15.15
Detectives Benson and Lake investigate a double homicide in which a man was shot and a woman was raped and stabbed. They soon team up with FBI Special Agent Cooper (Erika Christensen) who is tracking a serial killer and sexual sadist known as "The Woodsman." Through the Woodsman's aunt (Jane Cronin), they are able to find out the location of his latest victim. Police rescue the tortured woman (Amanda Leigh Cobb) but she succumbs to her injuries during treatment. The tragic ordeal turns into a case against a vigilante when the SVU discovers that the serial killer is already dead and that he was in fact the male victim discovered with the gunshot wound.
196	13	"Unorthodox"	David Platt	Josh Singer	January 15, 2008	0912	12.21
The sexual assault of a Jewish boy (Braeden Lemasters) prompts the attention of Munch and Stabler. Initially an orthodox rabbi (Bob Dishy) is suspected to be the one responsible, but the case turns into a media circus as a flood of young victims are revealed, with all the clues pointing to one of their classmates. It is discovered that a fourteen-year-old boy (Alexander Gould) is the rapist, but he is declared mentally ill as a result of daily exposure to pornography and minimal supervision by his single father (Mike McGlone).
197	14	"Inconceivable"	Chris Zalla	Dawn DeNoon	January 22, 2008	0914	12.98
When fertilized embryos disappear from a sperm bank, examination of a security tape points the detectives to two publicity-hungry extremists (Mark Moses and Janine Turner). Meanwhile, Olivia ponders her own decisions about fertility and motherhood.
198	15	"Undercover"	David Platt	Mark Goffman	April 15, 2008	0915	13.27
After a teenage girl (Shareeka Epps) is found raped in a community garden, Benson and Stabler find out that her mother (Daria Hardeman) is in a female correction facility. After the rape kit on the girl goes missing, the detectives realize that one of the corrections officers (Johnny Messner) at the facility is raping and brutalizing women. In order to find out who it is, Detective Benson goes undercover as a prisoner and is almost raped herself in the basement of the facility.
199	16	"Closet"	Peter Leto	Ken Storer	April 22, 2008	0916	11.64
When an investment banker is found murdered by an intern (Ian Alda), suspicion turns to his boyfriend (Bailey Chase), a professional football player who could lose everything if the truth about his sexuality comes to light. When information about his sexual orientation is leaked to the media, despite the best efforts of his publicity manager (Rick Hoffman), Benson comes under fire by Internal Affairs for her relationship with a reporter (Bill Pullman).
200	17	"Authority"	David Platt	Neal Baer & Amanda Green	April 29, 2008	0917	12.31
A telephone voice impersonating a police officer asks a fast food restaurant manager to strip search and tie up an employee (Monica Raymund). SVU detectives learn that this plan was orchestrated by an engineer, Merritt Rook (Robin Williams), in order to convince the public to be more discerning and oppose authority. After he is found not guilty, Rook gains much media attention and seizes an opportunity to abduct Olivia Benson. With the help of Rook's co-worker (Ka-Ling Cheung), Elliot is able to learn about the man's tragic past and track him down. In an apparent hostage situation, Rook tries to make Elliot inflict pain on Benson by way of a Milgram experiment.
201	18	"Trade"	Peter Leto	Jonathan Greene	May 6, 2008	0918	10.53
When a pregnant woman (Brandi Burkhardt) is found raped and murdered inside her burnt loft the team investigates a family of coffee importers. The suspects are numerous ranging from the woman's fiance (Matthew Davis) to his father (Stephen Collins). Further investigation reveals a twisted love rectangle between the woman, her fiance, the father and even the son's lawyer (Michelle Borth).
202	19	"Cold"	David Platt	Judith McCreary	May 13, 2008	0919	11.50
The SVU is shaken when multiple members of the squad are determined to stop a conspiracy of dirty cops. Haunted by a ten-year-old rape-murder case, Detective Lake meets with a contact (Deirdre Lovejoy) to find out about new evidence. On his way back, he gets into a firefight with two police officers and kills one of them. In an injured state, Lake tracks down the surviving rape victim (Victoria Cartagena) and convinces her to testify. While this is happening, the SVU squad discovers that the second shooter (Jack Gwaltney) works for the Fugitive Apprehension Team. Benson and Stabler arrive just in time to stop him from killing Lake and Novak proceeds to put the shooter on trial. However, the case quickly goes downhill in the courtroom and Novak withholds evidence in a last-ditch effort to win a conviction. She is informed by Elizabeth Donnelly (Judith Light) that she faces censure and possible suspension, and that the District Attorney declined the opportunity to refile the charges. This leaves Chester with no choice but to gun down the corrupt cop himself, therefore resulting in his arrest.
