= Elizabeth Donnelly =

Fictional character on Law & Order: Special Victims Unit

- Law & Order character
- Light as Elizabeth Donnelly in the season 8 episode "Haystack"
- First appearance: "Guilt"; March 29, 2002
- Last appearance: "Behave"; September 29, 2010
- Portrayed by: Judith Light

In-universe information
- Seasons: 3, 4, 6, 7, 8, 9, 10, 11, 12

Elizabeth "Liz" Donnelly is a fictional character from the NBC crime drama Law & Order: Special Victims Unit, portrayed by Judith Light. She made her first appearance during the third season episode "Guilt", which was broadcast on March 29, 2002.

== Development ==
=== Creation and casting ===
Elizabeth Donnelly was conceived by producer Ted Kotcheff. He wanted Judith Light to make a guest appearance on the show, after he saw her in a production of Wit. However, Light had to tour with the play and was unable to take up Kotcheff's offer. When Light returned to New York, Kotcheff remembered her and offered her the role of Donnelly. Light commented, "perhaps they were looking to create another strong female on the show, but that's how it came about." Gail Shister from The Philadelphia Inquirer reported Light's casting on February 19, 2002, saying she had been cast in a recurring role as the "tough new bureau chief". Light made her first appearance on March 29, 2002.

=== Characterization ===
In their book The Law and Order: Special Victims Unit Unofficial Companion, Susan Green and Randee Dawn described Donnelly as having "a steely presence with a sure moral compass". They also noted that other than her career path, little was known about Donnelly's life. Light said her character was "in love with the law" and not open to corruption, as she always wanted to do the right thing. Light called Donnelly "powerful" and added that she often helped people who had potential. After serving as Bureau Chief ADA, Donnelly became a judge in the seventh season.

== Character biography ==
Although originally appearing as a Bureau Chief ADA, Donnelly is elevated to judgeship. While working for the Manhattan District Attorney's Office, she was the supervisor of Alexandra Cabot (Stephanie March) and Cabot's successor, Casey Novak (Diane Neal). Donnelly has presided over numerous cases prosecuted by Novak, as well as a case prosecuted by Novak's successor, Kim Greylek (Michaela McManus), in the episode "Persona".

Although a judge, Donnelly represents both Novak and Det. Elliot Stabler (Christopher Meloni) in the season 8 episode "Haystack", when a man suing for custody of his child sues them for alleged conspiracy and assault. The suits are dropped following the man's arrest on kidnapping charges.

In the season 7 episode "Gone", Donnelly's office is bugged, resulting in a witness being abducted and murdered. When Novak and SVU detectives are unable to link the homicide to the bugging, Donnelly is reluctantly forced to dismiss the case due to lack of witness testimony, though it is later discovered that the defendants bribed a court officer to bug Donnelly's office. Donnelly helps to catch and interrogate the officer responsible.

In the season 9 episode "Cold", Donnelly calls Novak to her office and informs Novak that Novak will be censured and suspended for violating Brady rules. Novak asks Donnelly what Novak should do, and Donnelly replies, "Something else."

In the season 10 episode "Persona", Donnelly takes a leave of absence from her role as a judge to act as prosecutor on a cold case she was involved with in the 1970s, when a battered woman (Brenda Blethyn) murdered her husband. Donnelly admits to Det. Olivia Benson (Mariska Hargitay) that she was responsible for the woman escaping from custody and therefore took on the case due to "unfinished business".

In the season 10 finale episode "Zebras", Donnelly is poisoned by a syringe (containing potassium chloride, the chemical used for lethal injections) that CSU Tech Intern Dale Stuckey (Noel Fisher) had placed on a chair in her home, resulting in her hospitalization. He did this to get revenge against her for berating him after he made a mistake that cost the prosecution a case. She survives, and is seen trying cases in later episodes.

== Bibliography ==
- Green, Susan; Dawn, Randee (2009). Law & Order: Special Victims Unit: The Unofficial Companion. Dallas: BenBella Books. ISBN 978-1933771-88-5.
