= Kim Greylek =

Fictional character on Law & Order: Special Victims Unit

- Law & Order character
- Michaela McManus as Kim Greylek in "Confession"
- First appearance: "Trials"
- Last appearance: "Lead"
- Portrayed by: Michaela McManus

In-universe information
- Seasons: 10

Kim Greylek is a fictional character on the NBC crime drama Law & Order: Special Victims Unit, portrayed by Michaela McManus.

== Character overview ==
Kim Greylek transfers to the Manhattan District Attorney's Office in a lateral move from the U.S. Department of Justice's Office on Violence Against Women in Washington, D.C. Greylek is assigned to the Special Victims Unit as a permanent replacement of ADA Casey Novak (Diane Neal), who after the events that occurred in "Cold", has been censured. In D.C. Greylek is nicknamed "The Crusader", where she has dealt "with the policy making side of sex crimes" and moves to Manhattan's SVU "to make a difference".

== Character within SVU ==
Introduced in the tenth season premiere episode "Trials", Greylek maintains an unrelenting reputation unpopular with the detectives; she threatens to charge a defendant with a hate crime for raping two women and has a teenage boy charged with assaulting a police officer so he can be tested for HIV. Further, her hands-on approach in accompanying the detectives is at odds with Detective Elliot Stabler (Christopher Meloni), who does not believe he is able to do his job with Greylek looking over his shoulder.

In the episode "Babes", Greylek angers a woman believed to be involved with a young girl's suicide, but she was found not guilty. After gloating about her innocence, the woman physically attacks Greylek in the courtroom for correcting her about being "innocent" and to wash the blood off her hands before holding her daughter's baby. When the officers pull the woman off her, Greylek tells Stabler to charge her with assault.

However, Greylek has shown a softer side; warning Stabler to get a good defense attorney for his daughter Kathleen (Allison Siko), in the episode "Swing". Kathleen, who has bipolar disorder, is charged with breaking & entering in conjunction with theft, and the DA's office will prosecute her.

In the episode "Smut", Greylek successfully prosecutes serial rapist Eric Lutz (Michael Trucco), who claims that his actions were caused by violent pornography; Greylek tracks down Lutz's former fiancée, whom he also raped, and gets her to testify that Lutz does not use pornography and is simply violent by nature. Greylek also seeks justice when a man is brutally beaten outside a strip club, with the man's ex-wife and 13-year-old transgender daughter Hailey (Bridger Zadina) as the prime suspects, in the episode "Transitions". Before the case gets to trial, detectives Olivia Benson (Mariska Hargitay) and Stabler discover that it was Haley's guidance counselor who committed the crime. During the trial, Greylek uncovers that the guidance counselor is also a transgender woman and that is why she tried to help Haley.

The character is written out in episode "Lead", during the middle of a trial where pediatrician Gilbert Keppler (Lawrence Arancio) is found guilty of molesting his patients. Greylek is last seen doing a press conference with Captain Don Cragen (Dann Florek), Benson, and Stabler on the steps of the courthouse. When the doctor's attorney hands the SVU squad a lawsuit, Greylek responds, "What did you people do?". Later in the episode, Benson and Stabler discover the doctor murdered in his home. The detectives hold CSU out of the house until Cragen and Greylek get to the scene in case IAB wants to "screw with" them again. Sergeant John Munch (Richard Belzer) asks if they are sure Greylek isn't on one of her "'I need to be at the crime scene' crusades again", when Detective Fin Tutuola (Ice-T) realises "It's not Greylek" and they all see ADA Alexandra Cabot (Stephanie March) walk up to the scene with Cragen. Cabot tells the detectives that the Justice Department called Greylek back to D.C. and that District Attorney Jack McCoy (Sam Waterston) let her leave immediately.

== Development ==
It's so great to play a woman who's strong and independent and fighting for these victims ... she's fighting to put the bad guys away. What a role to sink your teeth into—I'm just thrilled. It's hard, but bring it on.

— Michaela McManus on what she likes most about Greylek .

After the departure of Diane Neal, who portrayed ADA Casey Novak from the fifth to ninth season of Law & Order: Special Victims Unit, Michaela McManus was approached to replace her. McManus, who departed One Tree Hill for the role, was cast as a series regular in the capacity of Assistant District Attorney. On the casting, creator and executive producer of SVU Dick Wolf claimed, "We look forward to [McManus] working with Neal [Baer], Ted [Kotcheff] and me to create another interesting and memorable character in the Law & Order universe".

The character was originally to be named "Polly Sturges", according to McManus. Then-SVU showrunner Neal Baer instead chose to name the character "Kim Greylek"; "Kim" after American actress Kim Novak (who also inspired the name of SVU character Casey Novak) and "Greylek" after Novak's character in the 1955 film 5 Against the House.

In the series, Greylek departs to D.C. in the fifteenth episode "Lead" and is replaced by Cabot (March) in a recurring capacity (while McManus continued to appear in the opening credits for the rest of the season). However, In April 2009, it was confirmed by TV Guide that McManus would not be returning to SVU, with no response from NBC as to why she departed. On her departure, Baer noted that, "She's [McManus] moved on. Sometimes the part and the actor just don't mesh. It was a mutual decision."

== Credits ==
McManus is credited in 22 episodes of SVU (appearing in 13) as Greylek, making her the shortest-serving ADA in the series.

Seasons	Years	Episodes																								
Seasons	Years	1	2	3	4	5	6	7	8	9	10	11	12	13	14	15	16	17	18	19	20	21	22	23	24	25
10	2008–09				×									×			×	×	×	×	×	×	×			
Seasons	Years	1	2	3	4	5	6	7	8	9	10	11	12	13	14	15	16	17	18	19	20	21	22	23	24	25
Seasons	Years	Episodes																								

Regular cast

×	Regular cast + no appearance

Recurring cast

Guest cast

No credit + no appearance

No episode
