= Casey Novak =

Fictional character on Law & Order: Special Victims Unit

ADA Casey Novak
- Law & Order character
- Novak in her last episode "Valentine's Day"
- First appearance: October 21, 2003 (episode 5.05: "Serendipity")
- Last appearance: April 18, 2012 (episode 13.18: "Valentine's Day")
- Portrayed by: Diane Neal

In-universe information
- Seasons: 5, 6, 7, 8, 9, 12, 13

Casey Novak is a fictional character on Law & Order: Special Victims Unit, portrayed by Diane Neal. She is the only female Assistant District Attorney (ADA) to have appeared in five complete seasons in any Law & Order series and the third-longest-running ADA in the entire franchise.

== Character overview ==
Casey Novak is a young and focused senior-assistant district attorney who has been with the Manhattan DA's office since 2001. It is revealed in early season five that she graduated from Harvard Law School, as seen on a plaque in her office. While sometimes deeply affected by the horrific crimes she deals with on the job, she does not often reveal her emotions. Although she quickly loses her innocence when dealing with sex crimes, she still shows uneasiness when dealing with the gray areas of human involvement, preferring the letter of the law to the messiness of each individual reality. Nonetheless, Novak has a 71 percent success rate in the cases she prosecutes, whereas the average for prosecutors is 44 percent. Novak is prone to blur the line between ADA and detective, as exemplified in the season 9 episode "Impulsive," where Novak essentially leads the investigation.

It is revealed that in her final year of law school, Novak was engaged to a man, Charlie, who had schizophrenia. She ended the relationship when his symptoms became so severe she felt she was no longer safe with him. In 2002, Charlie attacked her in her home during a psychotic episode. She convinced the police not to press charges, but ended the relationship. He eventually became homeless, and was found dead as a "John Doe" in the spring of 2007. She developed a deep compassion for the mentally ill afterward. While prosecuting a case, she deliberately sabotages a competency hearing for a schizophrenic child rapist to avoid him being extradited to Louisiana where he would face the death penalty. Manhattan's new DA Jack McCoy (Sam Waterston) calls Novak into his office and threatens to fire her and have her disbarred if she abuses the authority of the DA's office again.

In the season 6 episode "Goliath", Novak states that she is a big supporter of the U.S military. She explains that her father was an M60 door gunner on a Huey during the Vietnam War. His helicopter crashed three times, and he received a Purple Heart.

Novak lives in an apartment on the Upper West Side of Manhattan. She is Catholic. She used to work serving tables in order to pay for her college tuition. Sometimes, she rides her bicycle to work.

Novak is a redhead, although she had her hair dyed strawberry blonde and blonde for some of her appearances. She is also an avid softball player and a batter.

== SVU prosecutor (2003–08) ==
Novak prosecuted white collar crimes before being assigned full-time to the 16th Precinct in October 2003, after Alexandra Cabot (Stephanie March), thought to be dead, transfers into the Witness Protection Program. During her first case, Novak helps the SVU team save a little girl from a pedophile. Following her first case, Novak asks District Attorney Arthur Branch (Fred Thompson) to reassign her because she feels she cannot handle the intensity of prosecuting sex crimes, especially those committed against children. Branch refuses, saying that he had been eyeing her for the job for some time, and thought that she was a perfect choice for the position.

Novak arrives on the scene with guns blazing, intent on leaving her mark on the bureau, and immediately antagonizes detectives Elliot Stabler (Christopher Meloni) and Olivia Benson (Mariska Hargitay) by taking a hands-on approach, second-guessing their detective work and interfering with their interrogation of a suspect. Her intuition leads to the rescue of a child locked in a cooler on her very first case, and wins her the respect of the squad. She remains aloof and demanding with the detectives, however, until Capt. Don Cragen (Dann Florek) has a candid conversation with her about the necessity of working as a team, as she had previously worked with different cops in each case. By the sixth season, however, she has a good relationship with the SVU detectives, particularly Stabler, who is especially enraged when she is attacked and beaten up, and risks his career by threatening the man he believed to have done it.

Novak has an adversarial relationship with her former supervisor and mentor, Elizabeth Donnelly (Judith Light). In one case, Novak forces her (acting upon a directive from Branch) to recuse herself from a case. Occasionally, she finds herself opposing attorneys with whom she has worked before. Like her predecessor, Alexandra Cabot, she has, at various times, run afoul of stern, by-the-book Judge Lena Petrovsky (Joanna Merlin).

== Departure ==
Toward the end of the ninth season, it was announced that Diane Neal was departing the cast. Days later, it was rumored that she had been fired from the series. Neal said she "did talk to the crew" about her departure; she declined to say whether she was fired. She commented: "Rumors are rumors ... I love the crew. The crew loves me. We've really gotten along and bonded over these past five years. And they're always looking out for me and watching my back."

I've lasted longer by several years than almost any other ADA [in the Law & Order universe]. So every year I've been like, 'Is this going to be the one when I leave?' Dick Wolf is known for replacing his cast regularly. And the truth is, I'm really looking forward to the future.

— Neal on her departure from Law & Order: Special Victims Unit in April 2008

In the season 9 finale "Cold", Novak violates due process by violating the Brady rules while prosecuting a corrupt police officer who raped two 14-year-old illegal immigrants, killing one. Donnelly, now a judge, calls Novak into her chambers and informs her that the DA had declined to refile charges against the defendant because of her actions. Donnelly informs Novak that she is facing censure by the Bar and a suspension of her license to practice law for at least a year.

In the second episode of season 10, ADA Kim Greylek (Michaela McManus) asserts that Novak was disbarred for the violation.

== Return to SVU (2011–12) ==
Novak returns to SVU in the season 12 episode "Reparations", and reveals she was censured but not disbarred; her license was suspended for three years. In her first case after being re-hired by the District Attorney's office, she finds herself at odds with Law & Order: Los Angeles Deputy District Attorney Joe Dekker (Terrence Howard), who is the defendant's lawyer as well as his cousin. Dekker cites Novak's previous misconduct several times throughout the episode. When the case goes to trial, the presiding judge is Lena Petrovsky, whom Novak lied to in the season 9 finale. When Dekker's cousin goes against the deal in place at the allocution hearing and says he only broke into the woman's house and did not rape her, Petrovsky asks Novak if she is trying to railroad another defendant into custody; a shocked Novak replies that both the defendant and his attorney agreed to the deal. In the end, Novak and Stabler realize that the accuser made the rape story up because her grandfather told her to, and the defendant initially agreed because he wanted the girl's grandfather to believe she was raped. Novak subsequently makes a deal with Dekker for his cousin's breaking and entering charge and has the accuser arrested for perjury.

Novak, along with ADA Alex Cabot, returned to Law & Order: Special Victims Unit for its 13th season. She is first seen in the season's third episode "Blood Brothers", in which the SVU squad is investigating the teenage son of a high-profile political couple. She gets into a heated argument with Benson after she tells her that she is "off," to which Benson replies that Novak and her office have "lost their nerve." Novak is the prosecutor in four episodes during season 13, sharing the ADA duties with Cabot, Michael Cutter (Linus Roache), and David Haden (Harry Connick Jr.) She is last seen as the lead prosecutor in "Valentine's Day", in which she goes up against Defense Attorney Marvin Exley (Ron Rifkin), who is defending a woman who seems to have fabricated her own abduction.

== Appearances and crossovers ==
In 2005, Neal appeared as Casey Novak in a crossover within the larger Law & Order franchise that began in the Law & Order: Special Victims Unit season 6 episode "Night", and concluded in the Law & Order: Trial by Jury season 1 episode "Day".

== Credits ==
Neal has been credited in 112 episodes of SVU (appearing in 105) as Novak. Additionally, she appears in a 2005 episode of Law & Order: Trial by Jury, bringing her total episode count to 113 (appearing in 106).

She also starred in an earlier episode of SVU, season 3 episode 10 titled "Ridicule", however she portrayed one of three women accused of raping a male stripper, and her name and likeness were an entirely different character than Novak in the episode.

Law & Order: Special Victims Unit appearances
Seasons	Years	Episodes																								
Seasons	Years	1	2	3	4	5	6	7	8	9	10	11	12	13	14	15	16	17	18	19	20	21	22	23	24	25
5	2003–04																									
6	2004–05																	×								
7	2005–06	×												×						×						
8	2006–07																			×						
9	2007–08										×					×										
12	2011																									
13	2011–12																									
Seasons	Years	1	2	3	4	5	6	7	8	9	10	11	12	13	14	15	16	17	18	19	20	21	22	23	24	25
Seasons	Years	Episodes																								

Law & Order: Trial by Jury appearances
Season	Years	Episodes												
Season	Years	1	2	3	4	5	6	7	8	9	10	11	12	13
1	2005													
Seasons	Years	1	2	3	4	5	6	7	8	9	10	11	12	13
Seasons	Years	Episodes												

Regular cast

×	Regular cast + no appearance

Recurring cast

Guest cast

No credit + no appearance

No episode
