= Zebras (Law & Order: Special Victims Unit) =

- Law & Order: Special Victims Unit episode
- Episode no.: Season 10; Episode 22
- Directed by: Peter Leto
- Written by: Amanda Green; Daniel Truly
- Production code: 10022
- Original air date: June 2, 2009

Guest appearances
- Kelly Bishop as Julia Zimmer; Noel Fisher as Dale Stuckey; Carol Kane as Gwen; Mike Doyle as Ryan O'Halloran; Judith Light as Judge Elizabeth Donnelly; Nick Stahl as Peter Harrison

Episode chronology
← Previous "Liberties"	Next → "Unstable"
- Law & Order: Special Victims Unit season 10

"Zebras" is the twenty-second episode and season finale of the tenth season of the police procedural television series Law & Order: Special Victims Unit, and the show's 224th episode overall. It originally aired on NBC in the United States on June 2, 2009. In the episode, an open-and-shut case against a mentally disturbed murderer, played by Nick Stahl, is blown when a forensics technician makes a technical error. As Elliot and Olivia investigate additional murders believed to be the work of the same killer, they uncover a plot within their own department.

The episode was written by Amanda Green and Daniel Truly, and directed by Peter Leto. It was the final appearance of Mike Doyle, who had played forensics technician Ryan O'Halloran since 2003 and appeared on the show more than 50 times; the character was killed by fellow technician Dale Stuckey (Noel Fisher) as part of a surprise twist conceived by executive producer and showrunner Neal Baer. "Zebras" also included guest appearances by Kelly Bishop, Judith Light and Carol Kane as Gwen Munch, the conspiracy theorist ex-wife of Detective John Munch; Kane had previously played the same role opposite actor Richard Belzer in a 1997 episode of Homicide: Life on the Street.

== Plot ==
A father and daughter rollerblading in Central Park stumble across the body of a woman with several lacerations hidden in a bush. Munch (Richard Belzer) and Fin (Ice-T) learn Peter Harrison (Nick Stahl), who was performing community service for a prior crime against a woman, left work early with a cut thumb around the time of the murder. Stabler (Christopher Meloni) and Benson (Mariska Hargitay) question Harrison, who spouts wild conspiracy theories about the police. During an interrogation, Harrison suggests he killed the woman in Central Park for taking photos of him before his attorney, Julia Zimmer (Kelly Bishop), stops the questioning. Munch and Fin find a bloody knife during a search of Harrison's apartment and forensics technician Ryan O'Halloran (Mike Doyle) confirms the DNA matches the victim, resulting in an open-and-shut case against Harrison. However, Zimmer finds a technical error by forensics technician Dale Stuckey (Noel Fisher) in the evidence paperwork. Though Stuckey insists he made no mistake, Judge Elizabeth Donnelly (Judith Light) is forced to set Harrison free, and makes a harsh rebuke against Stuckey.

Shortly afterward, another woman is found murdered at Coney Island in a similar manner; Stuckey finds a soda can with a bloody fingerprint on it, later confirmed to be Harrison's. The police learn Harrison disclosed his hiding place to a friend on a conspiracy theorist website; Munch recognizes the friend as his ex-wife Gwen (Carol Kane), whom he convinces to reveal Harrison's location. After Harrison evades capture, Stabler and Benson ask for help from Zimmer, who said she has been taking care of Harrison since he lost his parents as a child. An unstable Harrison visits Zimmer, who calls Stabler and Benson to arrest him. As they are about to return to the precinct, Zimmer gets locked into her car and a poisonous gas is released into the air; Stabler breaks her car window, but is unable to save her in time.

Later, Judge Donnelly is nearly killed when she sits on a needle filled with potassium chloride at her home; she is saved when Stabler and Benson rush her to the hospital. O'Halloran tells Stabler and Benson that a mosquito sucked the blood from the killer as he or she was rigging Zimmer's car, and that the DNA from the blood will likely implicate Harrison. As the DNA is later being processed, however, O'Halloran is stabbed and killed by someone in the forensics lab. Stabler arrives and sees on the computer screen that the DNA matches Stuckey just before Stuckey knocks him out from behind. Stuckey then answers Stabler's phone when Benson calls to say that Stabler went out for lunch and forgot his phone. He then ties Stabler to a chair and starts torturing him. Stuckey admits he killed the woman at Coney Island in order to frame Harrison, and that he attacked Zimmer and Donnelly for embarrassing him. Benson arrives and is held at gunpoint by Stuckey, but she convinces Stuckey that she, too, hates Stabler and is in love with Stuckey. While Benson kisses Stuckey to distract him, Stabler kicks him from behind, allowing Benson to knock Stuckey out and free Stabler. When Stabler asks Benson how she knew he was in trouble, Benson says that Stuckey told her that he and O'Halloran went out for sushi, which she knows that Stabler hates.

== Production ==
"Zebras" was written by Amanda Green and Daniel Truly, and directed by Peter Leto. The surprise twist in the episode, in which forensics technician Ryan O'Halloran is killed by fellow technician Dale Stuckey, was conceived by Neal Baer, the series executive producer and showrunner. Baer said the decision to kill the character in the story "just came to [him] one day" and thought that "this may be a really interesting way to bring [the] cast together and deal with this story point". In particular, Baer said he wanted to kill a long-recurring character so the show could "explore characters' reactions to a death in an interesting way". Mike Doyle, the actor who played O'Halloran, was notified about the decision by Baer in a phone call a few weeks before the episode was filmed in May 2009. Baer said Doyle and the rest of the cast took the news well because, in his words, "I think everybody knew that somebody was going, so they weren't shocked." During a May 2009 interview, Baer hinted at the twist by telling media outlets that the season finale would include a surprise ending: "One of our own is murdered."

"Zebras" was the final episode for Doyle, who had been a recurring character since 2003 and had made more than 50 appearances on the show. The episode also marked the seventh on-screen death for the actor, who had been killed in several films and television episodes, including on the HBO series Oz. Christopher Meloni, who also appeared on Oz, comforted Doyle about his character's death by saying, "At least you're not getting gang-raped", a reference to Doyle's death scene from that show. The climax scene of "Zebras", in which Dale Stuckey threatens Elliot Stabler as Olivia Benson tries to talk him down, was filmed on May 7, 2009, in a warehouse in North Bergen, New Jersey. A crew member shouted "dead man walking!" to Doyle as he arrived on the set. The knife protruding from Doyle was staged by strapping to his chest a metal plate with a center slot holding the retractable blade of the fake knife.

Carol Kane played Gwen Munch, Detective John Munch's conspiracy theorist ex-wife. Kane played the same part alongside actor Richard Belzer in 1997 on the series Homicide: Life on the Street, which also starred Belzer as John Munch.

== Reception ==
=== Ratings ===
The episode was watched by 11.3 million viewers, making it the highest rated show of the night. It was the most watched episode of Law & Order: Special Victims Unit in more than a year, and was about two million viewers over its season average. It captured more viewers than the first one-hour episode of Inside the Obama White House, NBC's two-part special documenting one day in the White House of U.S. President Barack Obama; the show, which aired at 9 p.m., one hour before "Zebras", was seen by 9.1 million viewers, the most of its time-slot. The two shows made NBC, which had been experiencing poor ratings in recent years, the highest-watched network for the fourth night in a row. "Zebras" received a 3.5 rating / 9% share among viewers aged between 18 and 49, and a 2.6 rating / 8% share among viewers between 18 and 34. E! writer Joel Ryan, however, noted that Law & Order: Special Victims Unit had little competition other than re-runs because it aired during the summer season.

=== Critical response ===
Ken Tucker of Entertainment Weekly called the death of O'Halloran and the twist involving Stuckey "very welcome, because they added a fresh element of uncertainty to a show that can be predictable". Tucker also praised the return of Kelly Bishop as an attorney. In writing of the episode, Nick Zaino of TV Squad said: "Overall, a well-paced, well-written episode, and a whole lot of creepy fun", and said the scenes with Kane and Belzer were "laugh-out-loud funny". Movieweb.com ranked it as #4 on their "Best Episodes" list, writing, "'Zebras' is one of those SVU episodes that knows how to keep tensions up until the very end... This feels even better thanks to Fisher's performance, whose acting prowess raises the stakes to a whole new level. And even when people know not to believe the first suspect is the final culprit, the way this chapter unfolds makes it almost impossible not to be surprised by its end."
