= Law & Order: Special Victims Unit season 10 =

Season of American television series

Law & Order: Special Victims Unit
- Season 10
- Season 10 U.S. DVD cover
- Starring: Christopher Meloni; Mariska Hargitay; Richard Belzer; Ice-T; Michaela McManus; BD Wong; Tamara Tunie; Dann Florek
- No. of episodes: 22

Release
- Original network: NBC
- Original release: September 23, 2008 – June 2, 2009

Season chronology
- ← Previous; Season 9 Next → Season 11

The tenth season of the police procedural/legal drama Law & Order: Special Victims Unit premiered September 23, 2008, and ended June 2, 2009, on NBC. It was the last season of the show to occupy the Tuesday 10pm/9c timeslot.

== Production ==
The tenth season introduced writer Daniel Truly to SVU. He became a vocal correspondent about the production and was the first to comment on the appropriateness of Ice-T's casting in the show given the alleged misogyny in his music. Truly was used to programs that included frequent meetings with other writers and said "In some ways it's slightly lonelier" on SVU.

The making of the episode "Lunacy" was covered in detail by authors Susan Green and Randee Dawn. The episode, which filmed between July 14 and July 28, 2008, contained a scene in which detectives watch footage of an astronaut on board the International Space Station. In order to film the weightless scene, Kristina Klebe was harnessed into cables which were later edited out. Members of the production staff appeared as astronauts in a still picture. Another scene involved a fight between Detective Stabler and James Brolin's character. A table made of balsa wood and breakaway glass was used in this scene so that it could be broken easily. Early in "Lunacy", detectives learn that their evidence is degraded due to eels feasting on the body. Prop master Anthony Munafo mentioned that he spent eight hours finding a pet store that would sell them enough eels of the right size.

A later episode "Hell" condemned the activities of the Lord's Resistance Army in Uganda. Executive producer Neal Baer collaborated with the Enough Project to portray child soldiers truthfully and called the episode part of a "continuing commitment to bring the audience stories that resonate with timely social issues." The filming of "Hell" marked the first on-location use of the United Nations building in a television episode.

During the tenth season, the director of photography, George Pattison, expressed his desire to continue using 35mm film. He said "Ours is one of the last shows doing that ... Despite pressure from above to save money, Dick Wolf and our creative producers insist on sticking with a proven formula. Whether it's 100 or 0 degrees outside, these cameras work. And they give beautiful latitude compared with digital." Law & Order: Special Victims Unit continued using motion picture cameras for another two years but ultimately switched to digital for Season 13.

== Cast changes and returning characters ==
The unit's new Assistant District Attorney, Kim Greylek, played by Michaela McManus, began appearing in the season premiere. About the role, McManus said, "It's really tricky. This character has a lot of brain power and her vocabulary is different than mine." Despite appearing in the opening credits for every Season 10 episode, McManus’ role only last half the season. Neal Baer explained that "Sometimes the part and the actor just don't mesh." Stephanie March began reprising her role of ADA Alexandra Cabot in the same episode. Until "Lead", Stephanie March's last appearance as ADA Cabot was in the spin-off series Conviction. However, her last SVU appearance was in the sixth season which depicted her as still living in hiding. When asked if her reintroduction to SVU would finally explain how she got out of the witness protection program, March answered "I think this will be nice and neat and make sense." The episode was dedicated to deceased crew member Dennis Radesky.

The season finale "Zebras" was the last episode to feature Mike Doyle. His recurring character Ryan O'Halloran is killed after appearing in every season since the fifth. Neal Baer, who wanted to "explore characters' reactions to a death in an interesting way" decided to kill off the character and informed Doyle of the decision a few weeks before the episode was filmed.

== Cast ==
=== Main ===
- Christopher Meloni as Senior Detective Elliot Stabler
- Mariska Hargitay as Junior Detective Olivia Benson
- Richard Belzer as Sergeant John Munch
- Ice-T as Junior Detective Odafin "Fin" Tutuola
- Michaela McManus as Assistant District Attorney Kim Greylek (episodes 1–15)
- BD Wong as FBI Special Agent Dr. George Huang
- Tamara Tunie as Medical Examiner Dr. Melinda Warner
- Dann Florek as Captain Donald "Don" Cragen

=== Special guest star ===
- Stephanie March as Assistant District Attorney Alexandra Cabot (episodes 15–21)

=== Recurring ===
- Amir Arison as Dr. Manning
- Kelly Bishop as Defense Attorney Julia Zimmer.
- Caren Browning as Crime Scene Unit Captain Judith Siper
- Lizette Carrion as Assistant District Attorney Kristen Torres
- Lindsay Crouse as Judge D. Andrews
- John Cullum as Judge Barry Moredock
- Viola Davis as Defense Attorney Donna Emmett
- Mike Doyle as Crime Scene Unit Forensics Technician Ryan O'Halloran
- Noel Fisher as Crime Scene Unit Forensics Technician Dale Stuckey
- Joel de la Fuente as Technical Assistance Response Unit Technician Ruben Morales
- Isabel Gillies as Kathy Stabler
- Stephen Gregory as Dr. Kyle Beresford
- Peter Hermann as Defense Attorney Trevor Langan
- Judith Light as Executive Assistant District Attorney / Judge Elizabeth Donnelly
- David Lipman as Judge Arthur Cohen
- Deep Katdare as Dr. Parnell
- Alex Kingston as Defense Attorney Miranda Pond
- Swoosie Kurtz as Judge Hilda Marsden
- Joanna Merlin as Judge Lena Petrovsky
- Audrie J. Neenan as Judge Lois Preston
- Allison Siko as Kathleen Stabler
- David Thornton as Defense Attorney Lionel Granger

=== Guest stars ===
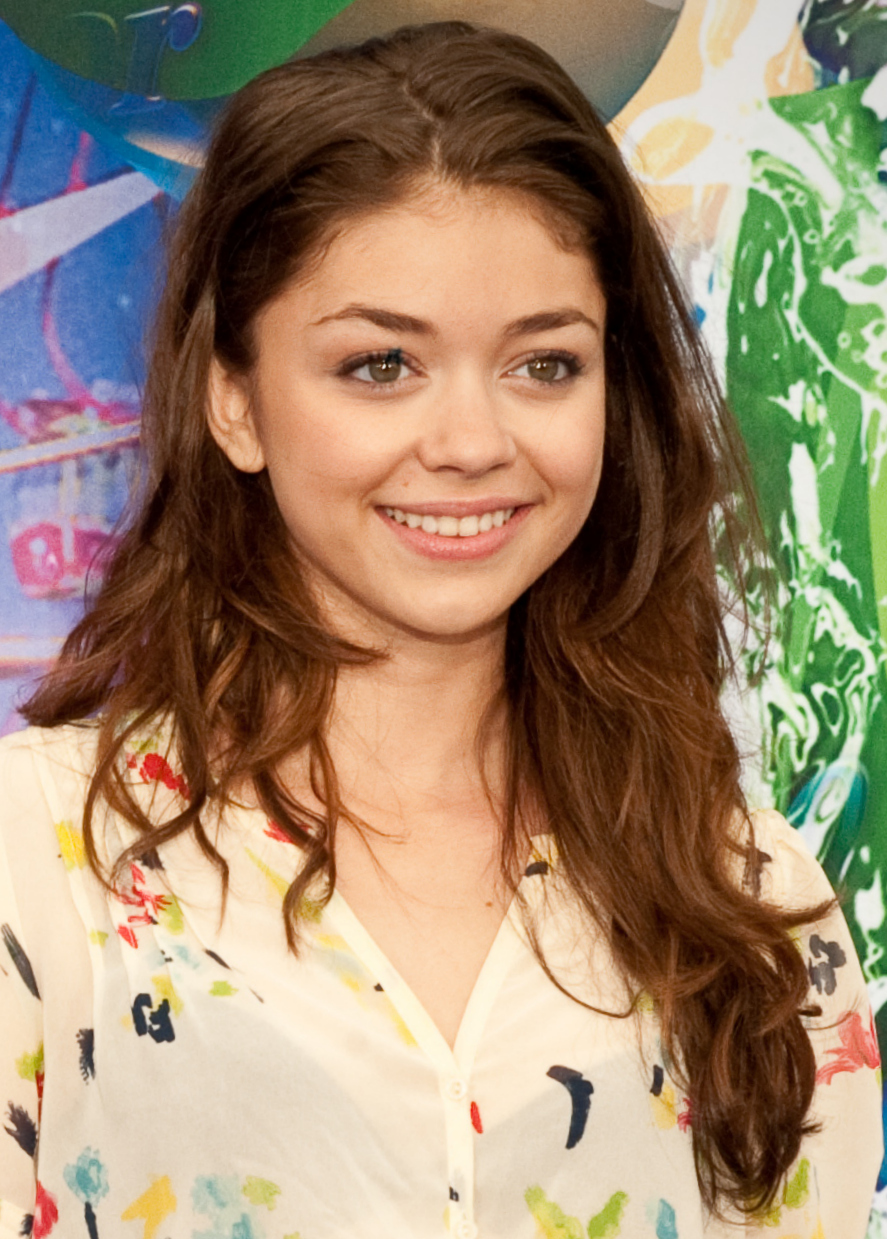
After SVU season 3 Sarah Hyland played a hyperactive student in "Hothouse," followed by a breakout role in Modern Family.

The premiere episode "Trials" stars Sara Gilbert as a rape victim who has given up her child and Luke Perry and Julie Bowen as the foster parents who begin taking care of him. When interviewed about his character, Perry stated that "there are always moments when you gotta find the humanity to people who may be considered the bad guy." Gilbert mentioned being a fan of the show and said "People know me more for comedy, I think, so it's always exciting to me when I get to play something so dramatic." For the role of the foster child, the directors held auditions in New York and Los Angeles before casting Jae Head. In the same episode, Mary Beth Evans briefly appeared as a doctor. She said that the head of NBC daytime "wanted to make Days of Our Lives less of an island and get people from our show onto other NBC shows."

In the third episode "Swing", Ellen Burstyn portrayed Bernadette Stabler, Elliot Stabler's mother who has bipolar disorder. She won a Primetime Emmy Award for Outstanding Guest Actress in a Drama Series for the role.

The fourth episode "Lunacy" was the first filmed in the season and starred James Brolin as an astronaut who used to be one of Stabler's role models. Kristina Klebe played an astronaut who is murdered and Chris Elliott played an enthusiast who follows them around. Christopher Meloni, who stars as Elliot Stabler, joked "Could there be a more confusing actor to have on this show than someone named Chris Elliott?"

The following episode "Retro" which criticized the AIDS denialism movement previously had a working title of "Deniers". It was advertised as being "a big Tamara Tunie episode." Tunie was asked about Martin Mull's character in an interview. She answered "What's frightening is that his argument can sound sane. And Martin is smart enough to make one pause."

The sixth episode "Babes" starred actor and singer Jesse McCartney as a chastity advocate. He commented that the role took him into new territory, saying "I play a murder suspect, a super-Catholic conservative white boy. It's definitely a stretch and a leap. It's an emotional role."

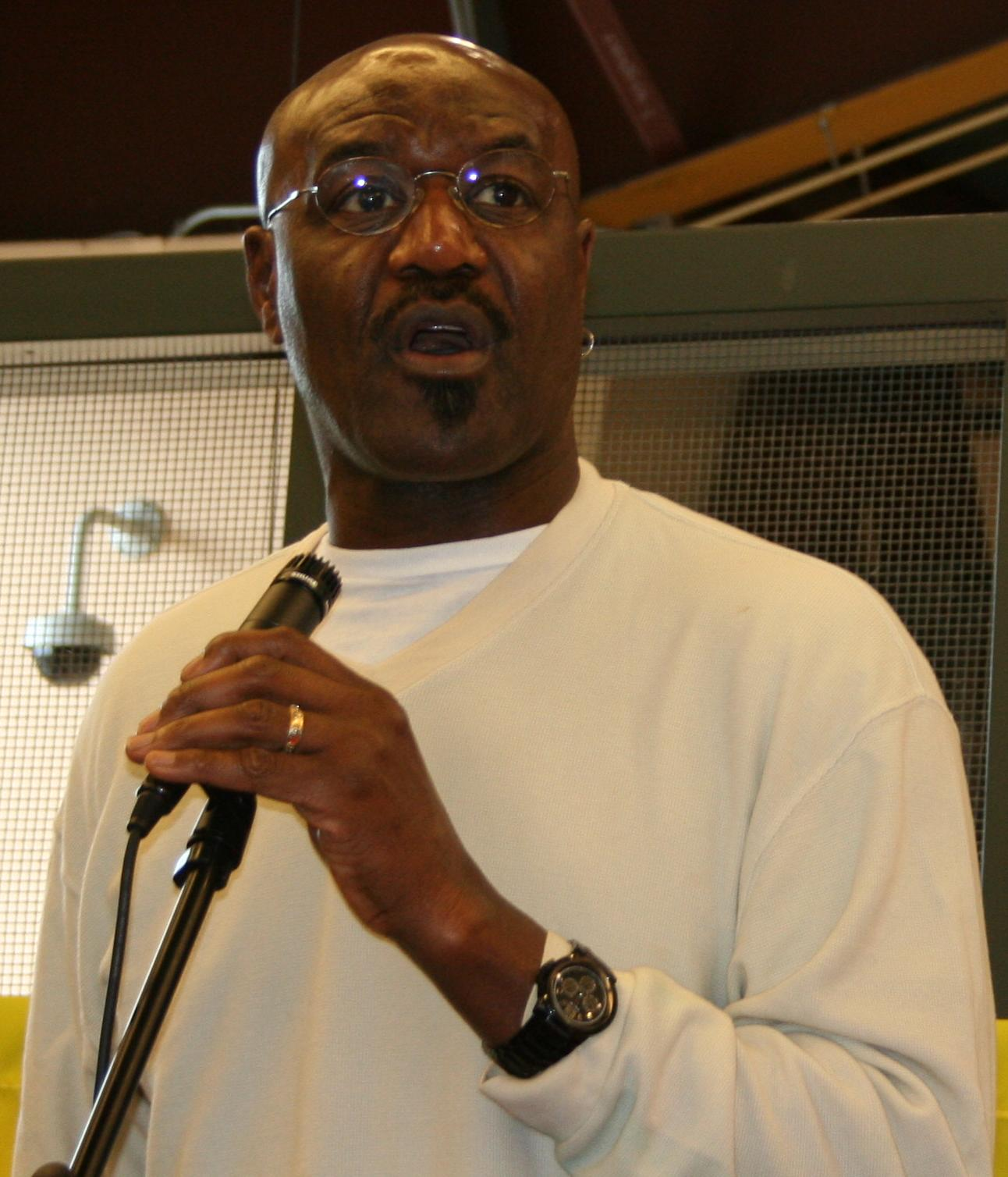
Delroy Lindo plays a sharp detective and grieving father in "Baggage" for which he won an NAACP Image Award for Outstanding Supporting Actor in a Drama Series.

The seventh episode "Wildlife" was promoted before the season began for an undercover scene that showed chemistry between Detectives Benson and Stabler. One of the animals shown in this episode was an eleven-month-old white handed gibbon named Kimba. His fictional species in the show was named the "white crested gibbon" because there was no way that a critically endangered black crested gibbon could be used in the filming.

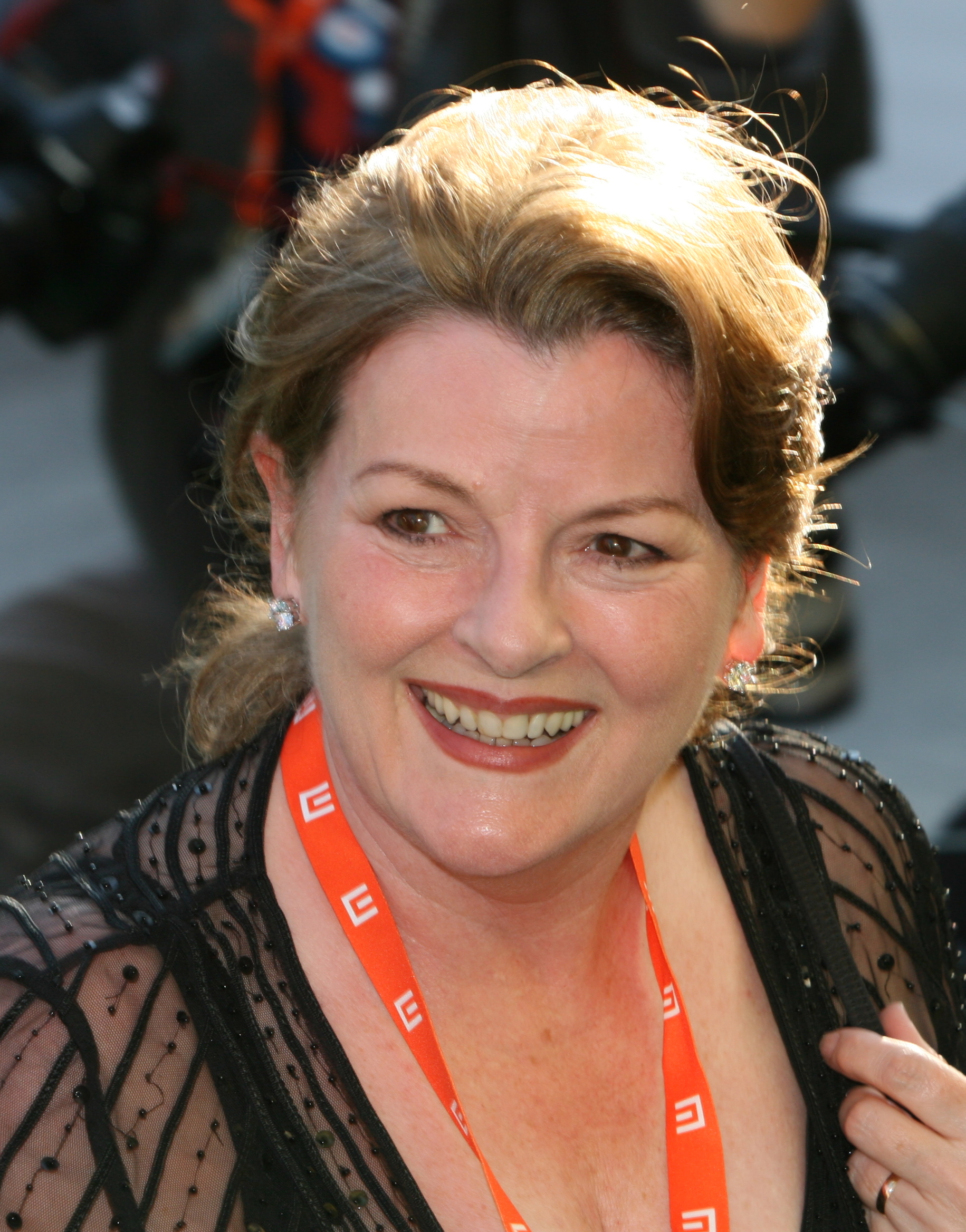
Brenda Blethyn guest starred in "Persona."

The eighth episode "Persona" guest-starred Brenda Blethyn as Caroline Cresswell, a sympathetic fugitive who has been living under a pseudonym. She was nominated for an Outstanding Guest Actress Emmy for her performance.

Michael Trucco played a rapist in the tenth episode "Smut". He mentioned a flurry of comments on his message board from Battlestar Galactica fans following his SVU appearance. Kelly Hu played one of his victims seen at the start of the episode. She blogged "I get to be the victim this time. Fun.", referring to her numerous previous roles as a police officer.

Bridger Zadina gave a widely acclaimed performance as a male-to-female transgender teen in "Transitions". He was one of over 200 child actors who auditioned for casting director Jonathan Strauss and appeared in Google's list of top 30 searches after the episode aired. "Transitions" was submitted for Emmy contention but not nominated.

The following episode "Lead" featured the return of Stephanie March's character, ADA Alexandra Cabot. March expressed excitement about news that she would work with Judith Light again. When interviewed about the episode, Neal Baer said "I always like to play with the format and it also has flashbacks which we rarely do."

The sixteenth episode "Ballerina" guest-starred Carol Burnett as retired dancer Birdie Sulloway. Many of the dancing credits her character mentions in the episode are in fact highlights of Burnett's dancing career. She received an Emmy nomination for Outstanding Guest Actress in a Drama Series for this episode.

The seventeenth episode "Hell" focused on the lives of child soldiers. Mike Colter portrayed a warlord named Joseph Serumaga. Verne Gay of News 12 Networks exclaimed that Colter's character was "played with scary... conviction." Cicely Tyson played an adoptive parent in the episode. According to Neal Baer, she was contracted to appear with short notice.

The episode "Selfish" involved the discovery of a dead baby and the fact that her mother, played by Hilary Duff, covered it up. Initial reports about the episode claimed that it was a response to the Caylee Anthony case. However, Neal Baer cautioned viewers with "You may think it's something familiar, but it turns out it's not." The main focus of the episode is the trial of a mother who inadvertently caused the death of another child by not vaccinating her own child against measles. Neal Baer took a particular liking to this episode in a 2012 interview, saying "It raised this really interesting question about not only what is your responsibility to your own child but to the community of children. It made the show more complex than 'I know what's best for my child.'"

In the season finale "Zebras", Carol Kane played John Munch's ex-wife, whom she previously played on Homicide: Life on the Street. About the reprisal, Neal Baer said "We're thrilled to have Gwen Munch return to her true love."

== Episodes ==
Law & Order: Special Victims Unit season 10 episodes
No. overall	No. in season	Title	Directed by	Written by	Original release date	Prod. code	U.S. viewers (millions)
203	1	"Trials"	David Platt	Dawn DeNoon	September 23, 2008	1002	9.68
Detectives Benson and Stabler investigate allegations of child abuse when a young boy (Jae Head) is caught driving a runaway van. The boy explains how his foster parents (Julie Bowen and Luke Perry) bribe him in exchange for abusive medical testing. As Detective Benson continues to study his accusations, she is led back to a victim of an unsolved rape case (Sara Gilbert). After reviewing both cases, the detectives uncover a connection between them that is complicated and they meet SVU's new ADA, Kim Greylek (Michaela McManus), who quickly butts heads with everyone. Distraught by frightening memories of being sexually assaulted, Benson decides that she needs help and seeks counselling.: While visiting a bar, Sergeant Munch talks to Detective Tutuola about how he used to own a bar in Baltimore and also mentions several people from his past that have left him. The names mentioned included previous partners on SVU (Monique Jeffries and Brian Cassidy) as well as some from Homicide: Life on the Street (Meldrick Lewis and Stanley Bolander), the series from where Munch's character originates. The history behind the bar is also from that series.
204	2	"Confession"	Arthur W. Forney	Judith McCreary	September 30, 2008	1003	10.39
An ashamed pedophile (Marshall Allman) confesses to Benson that he has been fantasizing about his young stepbrother (Aaron Mayer) and says that it is only a matter of time before he does the unthinkable. He also admits to looking at a website to try to curb his pedophilic urge. With no crime committed, the detectives decide to investigate the website for pedophiles leading them to the creator (Tom Noonan). When Stabler discovers his daughter Elizabeth's picture on the website, he lashes out at the man who put it there and gets suspended. When the older stepbrother goes missing this puts his whole family (Teri Polo and Josh Charles) under investigation.
205	3	"Swing"	David Platt	Amanda Green	October 14, 2008	1004	9.51
Stabler is called to a breaking-and-entering scene home because the trespasser is carrying the wallet of Stabler's daughter Kathleen (Allison Siko). Stabler is shocked to find his daughter abusing drugs and behaving promiscuously, and it is determined that Kathleen has bipolar disorder, but she refuses to admit it. Elliot must turn to his estranged mother Bernadette Stabler (Ellen Burstyn), as she is also bipolar, to testify in court that the disorder runs in the family. Bernadette, who is proud of her personality, refuses to equate it with criminal behavior, until Benson steps in to help.
206	4	"Lunacy"	Peter Leto	Daniel Truly	October 21, 2008	1001	9.50
A famous astronaut (Kristina Klebe) is found dead and Stabler's old mentor Dick Finley (James Brolin), after whom Stabler's son is named, helps investigate the case. They first believe the victim is linked to a string of serial rapes, but other suspects closer to the space program present themselves. An obsessed fan (Chris Elliott) is questioned, but is released and soon gets into a gun battle with Finley. Stabler becomes suspicious of Finley after Finley keeps diverting attention away from himself and Stabler learns about Finley's own aspirations of going into space.
207	5	"Retro"	Peter Leto	Story by : Joshua Kotcheff & Jonathan Greene; Teleplay by : Jonathan Greene	October 28, 2008	1005	9.33
When a baby is found with advanced AIDS, Benson and Stabler are called in to investigate why someone would let a baby go untreated for HIV. They are led to a highly unethical doctor (Martin Mull), an AIDS denialist, who believes and teaches that HIV does not cause AIDS and offers alternative treatments to cure HIV. They search for more families that have been influenced by him and are led to a particular family whose younger daughter died of AIDS, which calls the mother (Paula Malcomson) and son (Aidan Mitchell) into question.
208	6	"Babes"	David Platt	Daniel Truly	November 11, 2008	1006	9.42
The investigation into the burning death of a homeless teenager leads Stabler and Munch to a Catholic high school where a senior (Philip Ettinger) admits to the crime. He confesses because he thought his sister was raped by the man, when in truth, his sister (Brittany Robertson) and her friends made a pregnancy pact and willingly had sex to become pregnant. One of those friends (Jessica Varley) is later found dead in an apparent suicide after being harassed online by an angry mother (Debi Mazar). Greylek files a case against her which comes dangerously close to violating the first amendment, but it is eventually discovered that the girl was murdered by her boyfriend (Jesse McCartney) out of jealousy.
209	7	"Wildlife"	Peter Leto	Mick Betancourt	November 18, 2008	1008	10.11
A woman with a Spix's macaw (an endangered species of bird) in her purse turns up dead and her wounds are determined to have been inflicted by a tiger. A hip hop artist (Big Boi), whom the detectives track down, helps Stabler infiltrate an animal smuggling ring run by an infamous killer (Andrew Divoff). The abundance of undercover work begins to not only jeopardize Elliot's marriage, but also his life when Benson underestimates the danger he is in and he is shot. During a planned sale of an endangered gibbon, Benson avenges her partner by arresting a key member (Reg E. Cathey) of the smuggling ring, who turns out to be an undercover officer.
210	8	"Persona"	Helen Shaver	Amanda Green	November 25, 2008	1009	8.59
A woman (Clea DuVall) hides in an alley after claims of being abused and raped by her husband (Nathaniel Marston). Benson gets her to admit the abuse, but she recants before being murdered by her husband. While solving this crime, Benson meets the woman's older neighbor Linnie (Brenda Blethyn) and stumbles upon another case of spousal abuse and murder. It is revealed that Linnie was involved in an abusive relationship until she killed her former husband and escaped custody under the supervision of then-ADA Donnelly (Judith Light). Having been humiliated, Donnelly returns to the DA's Office to seek the maximum sentence. However after Benson stands up for Linnie, Donnelly is touched by the reason for the woman's escape – Linnie was intimidated because Donnelly was the strong woman that she could never be. Linnie's husband (Mike Farrell) leaves after hearing about her double life.
211	9	"PTSD"	Eriq La Salle	Judith McCreary	December 2, 2008	1007	10.33
Benson and Tutuola respond to the murder of a pregnant marine who was raped by one of her fellow marines in Iraq. The two find a suspect (Ryan Kwanten) and become convinced of his guilt, but Greylek faces difficulties when the Navy Commander (Frank Whaley) threatens to shut down their investigation. Benson discovers new evidence, and the real rapist (Dominic Fumusa) is identified along with his wife (Amy Spanger), who committed the murder. During the proceedings, Benson's prior sexual assault stirs up painful memories.
212	10	"Smut"	Chris Eyre	Kam Miller	December 9, 2008	1010	11.02
A woman (Kelly Hu) is found wandering Riverside Park, beaten and raped, and has no memory of what happened. Benson discovers that on the day of her flight out of the country, she instead left the airport with a mysterious man (Michael Trucco). This man is identified and with further probing, the detectives find rape-themed amateur pornographic videos on his computer. Stabler and Benson search for incriminating evidence, but each of his victims from the videos suffers from memory loss from the attack due to the use of date-rape drugs. Attempting to trace the other women in the videos, the detectives must re-inform each victim of her attack to get her testimony. Struggling to remind each victim of her rape, Benson must face the fact that she is still thinking like a victim, in order to get the testimony of one victim in particular (Christy Pusz), who can put the rapist away for good.
213	11	"Stranger"	David Platt	Dawn DeNoon	January 6, 2009	1011	10.82
A teenage girl (Ellen Woglom) miraculously returns home to her parents (Patrick Collins and Tess Harper) after being reported missing over four years ago. Unrecognizable to her family, she tells Benson and Stabler of the cement cell where she spent the past four years as a sex slave and of her fortunate escape. One of the sisters (Kate Baldwin) is relieved to see her after launching a website asking for search tips, but the other (Natalia Payne) seems annoyed with her return. In search of the mystery kidnapper, Benson and Stabler drive the victim around town to help stir up any memories of her abduction. When the answers they get do not seem to match up, the detectives find revealing evidence that make them question the kidnapping story. When they find the girl's abuser (Peter Lewis), they learn that the truth is no less disturbing.
214	12	"Hothouse"	Peter Leto	Charley Davis	January 13, 2009	1012	9.77
When the body of a fourteen-year-old girl (Juliet Brett) is found floating in the Hudson River, Benson and Stabler think she was smuggled into the country by sex traffickers. Tutuola discovers the victim's exceptional academic success and suspects that this had something to do with her murder. The detectives find out that the girl's father (George Tasudis) uses violence to coerce their other daughter (Aya Cash) into non-stop studying, and their mother (Funda Duval) is afraid to stop him. The killer turns out to be a high school student (Sarah Hyland) who obsesses over impressing her mother (Enid Graham). Mitigating circumstances come into play when the SVU discovers that shesuffered from sleep deprivation and overdosed on drugs used to treat ADD.
215	13	"Snatched"	David Platt	Mick Betancourt	February 3, 2009	1013	10.34
When a young girl (Daisy Tahan) is kidnapped, the girl's mother (Michelle Ray Smith) limmediately points Benson and Stabler in the direction of her ex-husband (Ron Eldard), a recently paroled convict. The ex-con's alibi checks out, but Stabler and Tutuola learn that his wife's father (Dabney Coleman) is a master thief with many enemies. Upon confronting the old man, the detectives learn that he has Alzheimer's disease, and with the help of Dr. Huang, they are able to put clues together that lead them to a questionable ally.
216	14	"Transitions"	Peter Leto	Ken Storer	February 17, 2009	1014	9.48
When a man (Frank Grillo) is found badly beaten in a strip club parking lot, a fake fingernail leads the detectives to believe that the attacker is female. The victim awakes in the hospital with no memory of what happened, but brings the attention to his ex-wife (Wendy Makkena) and their thirteen-year-old transgender daughter (Bridger Zadina). She makes it no secret that she hated her father for not accepting her as a girl, causing the detectives to suspect her as well as her transgender boyfriend (Daniel Sea). The perpetrator is eventually revealed to be a guidance counsellor (Aisha Hinds) who has her own painful memories regarding gender identity.
217	15	"Lead"	David Platt	Jonathan Greene	March 10, 2009	1015	11.07
A pediatrician (Lawrence Arancio) is found guilty of sexually assaulting four of his male patients. But when Stabler and Benson go to him for questioning regarding a lawsuit, they find him murdered in his apartment. While waiting for Greylek to show up at the scene, the detectives are surprised to find out that she has transferred out and been replaced by ADA Alexandra Cabot, who is no longer in witness protection. Stabler and Benson's investigation leads to the developmentally challenged son (John Gallagher Jr.) of wealthy parents (Fredric Lehne and Laura Leigh Hughes), who is arrested for the murder. As the trial goes on, the detectives discover that his intellectual disability was caused by lead poisoning and his affinity for Chinese-made products.
218	16	"Ballerina"	Peter Leto	Daniel Truly	March 17, 2009	1016	10.74
When Benson and Stabler arrive on the scene of a single murder, they discover two more dead bodies and link one of them to a strip club owned by a former Rockette (Carol Burnett). She and her nephew Chet (Matthew Lillard) try to assist with the investigation, but when the abusive husband (Vincent Curatola) and the prime suspect for the three murders, suddenly dies, the detectives suspect that the dancer may be a black widow.
219	17	"Hell"	David Platt	Amanda Green	March 31, 2009	1017	9.37
A young girl (Julyza Commodore) is found in an alley with her throat cut and evidence of repeated rape and physical abuse. When asked to write who attacked her, she draws a picture of the devil. When Munch investigates, the squad meets a pastor (Robert Wisdom), the girl's adoptive father, who rescued her and her friend (Gbenga Akinnagbe) from the Lord's Resistance Army. One of its infamous members (Mike Colter), known for recruiting child soldiers, is suspected of being the girl's attacker.
220	18	"Baggage"	Chris Zalla	Judith McCreary	April 7, 2009	1018	9.26
After an up-and-coming artist is brutally murdered in her apartment, Tutuola and Stabler link her death to another unsolved murder case. As they pursue the case further, they realize that these two murders have striking similarities to a string of murders by a mysterious serial killer that Major Case Detective Victor Moran (Delroy Lindo) has been following for months. Moran fights to keep control over the case while Tutuola and Stabler struggle to find the killer (Nelson Vasquez).
221	19	"Selfish"	David Platt	Mick Betancourt	April 28, 2009	1019	10.55
When a woman (Gail O'Grady) reports the disappearance of her 11-month-old granddaughter, the detectives suspect the girl's mother (Hilary Duff) of killing her daughter. The detectives however find out that the baby actually died of measles because another mother (Anastasia Barzee) refused to vaccinate her son. After Cabot puts the evangelical mother on trial, she is found not guilty of manslaughter, prompting the baby's grandfather (Mike Pniewski) to take the law into his own hands.: Based on Casey Anthony case.
222	20	"Crush"	Peter Leto	Jonathan Greene	May 5, 2009	1020	9.82
A high school student (Carly Schroeder) falls down a flight of stairs sending her into a coma. The SVU is alerted when the doctor's examination reveals signs of physical abuse. Upon waking, the girl refuses to name her attacker, even though the detectives already have two suspects: the girl's boyfriend (Alexander Nifong) and a self-described 'drama-geek' (Ezra Miller) with a crush on her. Frustrated, a family court prosecutor (Melinda McGraw) convinces Benson to use sexting as a pretext for arresting her for distributing child pornography. Faced with this ultimatum and helped by Stabler's daughter Kathleen (Allison Siko), the victim admits to being abused by her boyfriend. Afterwards, the detectives plan a sting operation against a biased judge (Swoosie Kurtz) and her clerk (Geoffrey Cantor) after they are unable to make the child pornography charges disappear.: Episode partially based on the 2008 Pennsylvania kids for cash scandal.
223	21	"Liberties"	Juan J. Campanella	Dawn DeNoon	May 19, 2009	1021	6.73
When a woman (Sprague Grayden) seeks to have a restraining order reinstated against her ex-boyfriend (Jon Patrick Walker), the assigned judge has something else on his mind. For peace of mind, Judge Koehler (Alan Dale) asks Stabler to question a convicted serial killer (Victor Arnold) about the whereabouts of his son's body, which adds a new twist to the case.
224	22	"Zebras"	Peter Leto	Amanda Green & Daniel Truly	June 2, 2009	1022	11.56
A tourist is found dead in Central Park with the word "guilty" written across her forehead. With the help of CSU technician Dale Stuckey, Benson and Stabler discover that a deranged former artist (Nick Stahl) was at the park during the crime. They arrest him, but are unable to make the charges stick due to a clerical error by Stuckey. Munch and Tutuola attempt to follow the prime suspect to Coney Island and discover another dead body after losing the suspect. At first, they assume that their mark escaped and committed the murder, however subsequent murders and attacks tell them that something much more sinister is going on.: Carol Kane previously played the part of Gwen Munch in a sixth season episode of Homicide: Life on the Street.
