= Joanna Merlin =

American actress and casting director (1931–2023)

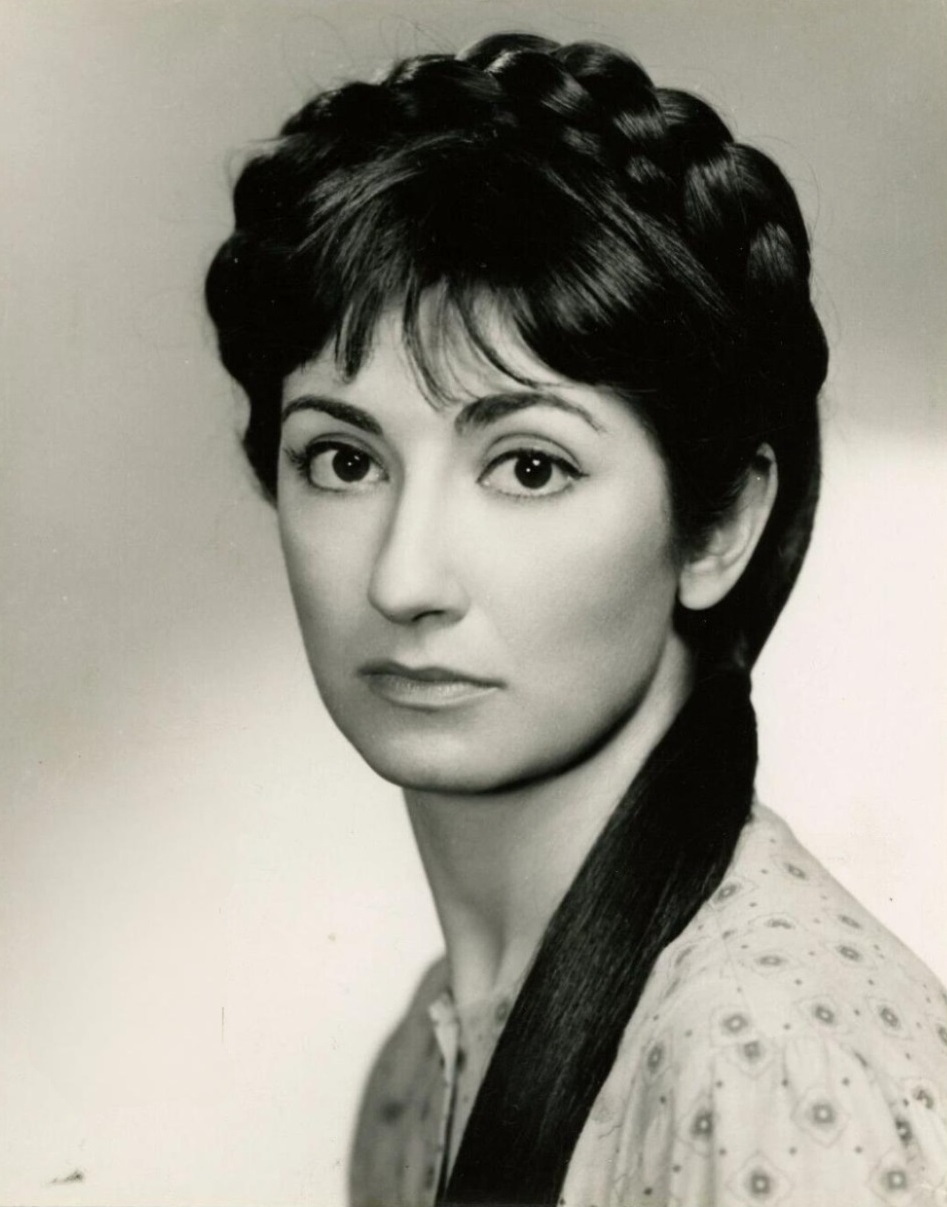
- Born: JoAnn Delores Ratner; July 15, 1931; Chicago, Illinois, U.S.
- Died: October 15, 2023 (aged 92); Los Angeles, California, U.S.
- Occupations: Actor, teacher, author, casting director
- Years active: 1956–2017
- Spouses: Martin Lubner (m. 1950; div. 1955) David Dretzin (m. 1965; died 2006)
- Children: Rachel Dretzin; Julie Dretzin

Joanna Merlin (born JoAnn Delores Ratner; July 15, 1931 – October 15, 2023) was an American actress and casting director who worked with Stephen Sondheim and starred in the original Broadway production of Fiddler on the Roof. She wrote two acting guides and was a faculty member of New York University's graduate acting program. From 2000 to 2011, she was known for her recurring role on Law & Order: Special Victims Unit as Judge Lena Petrovsky.

== Early life ==
JoAnn Delores Ratner, who later took her mother's maiden name, was born in Chicago, Illinois, on July 15, 1931, to Toni Merlin and Harry Ratner, a Jewish grocer. Her parents had immigrated to the United States from Russia. Her family also included her older sister, Harriet Glickman, who would go on to gain recognition for helping persuade Charles M. Schulz in 1968 to add a black character to his Peanuts strip, which he did with the introduction of Franklin.

Merlin first acted on stage at age 11, joining a community theatre production, Too Many Marys. Merlin's family moved to Los Angeles when she was fifteen. She attended UCLA, though did not graduate, and later studied under Michael Chekhov, learning his world-renowned acting technique. She was described as the last student of Chekhov who was still alive and teaching.

== Career ==
Merlin made her first screen appearance in Cecil B. DeMille's film The Ten Commandments in 1956. Five years later, she made her Broadway debut in Becket before playing Tzeitel in Harold Prince's production of Fiddler on the Roof. She left the cast of Fiddler on the Roof before the end of its tour to take care of her two small children, but Harold Prince gave her the opportunity to become involved in casting with a more flexible schedule. Company was the first musical for which Merlin served as the casting director. She was also in charge of casting for such plays as Follies, Evita and Sweeney Todd.

In 1986, she served as casting director for the John Carpenter film, Big Trouble in Little China.

After making appearances in several feature films, including the movie Fame, in which she played Miss Olivia Berg, a classical dance teacher; Merlin appeared in the NBC crime drama Law & Order in 1992 as a defense attorney. Like many actors from that show, she went on to play other characters in the Law & Order franchise - another defense attorney in the original show and a more recurring role as Judge Lena Petrovsky, a judge who was very stern, by-the-book, and scolded or sanctioned, at various times, ADAs Casey Novak (Diane Neal) and Alexandra Cabot (Stephanie March) and Detective (now Captain) Olivia Benson (Mariska Hargitay), in its first spin-off Law & Order: Special Victims Unit. In the latter role, she appeared in 43 episodes, across every season between the years 2000 and 2011.

Merlin taught in New York University's graduate acting program at the Tisch School of the Arts and in 1999, founded the Michael Chekhov Association where she taught acting workshops.

== Personal life and death ==
After a marriage to Martin Lubner in the 1950s ended in divorce, Merlin was married to David Dretzin from 1965 until his death in 2006, from an injury sustained in a car accident. They had two daughters: Rachel, a documentary filmmaker; and Julie, an actress.

Merlin died from myelodysplastic syndrome at the Los Angeles home of her daughter Rachel, on October 15, 2023, at the age of 92.

== Filmography ==
=== Film ===
Year	Title	Role	Notes
1956	The Ten Commandments	Jethro's Daughter	
1958	Weddings and Babies	Josie	
1975	Hester Street	Jake's Landlady	
1979	All That Jazz	Nurse Pierce	
1980	Fame	Miss Berg	
1982	Soup for One	Allan's Mother	
1982	Love Child	Mrs. Sturgis	
1983	Baby It's You	Mrs. Rosen	
1984	The Killing Fields	Sydney Schanberg's Sister	
1985	Year of the Dragon	Casting Director	
1986	Big Trouble in Little China	Casting Director	
1987	Prince of Darkness	Bag Lady	
1987	The Last Emperor	Casting Director	
1988	Mystic Pizza	Mrs. Araújo	
1990	Mr. and Mrs. Bridge	Casting Director	
1991	Class Action	Estelle Ward	
1992	The Lover	Casting Director	
1993	Little Buddha	Tibetan Casting: New York	
1993	M. Butterfly	Casting Consultant	
1993	Mr. Wonderful	Loretta	
1995	Jefferson in Paris	Casting Director	
1995	Two Bits	Guendolina	
1996	MURDER and Murder	Doris	
1998	City of Angels	Teresa Messinger	
2001	The Jimmy Show	Emily	
2003	Just Another Story	Sadie	
2007	The Invasion	Joan Kaufman	
2008	Beautiful Hills of Brooklyn	Producer, Co-writer and the role of Jesse Sylvester	
2008	The Wackness	Grandma Shapiro	
2010	Sarah's Key	Mme. Rainsferd	
2017	Active Adults	Miriam	

=== Television ===
Year	Title	Role	Notes
1960	CBS Repertoire Workshop	Musya	Episode: "The Seven Who Were Hanged"
1962	Naked City	Gloria Werminski	Episode: "King Stanislaus and the Knights of the Round Stable"
1963	The Defenders	Katy Martinez	Episode: "The Bagman"
1964	East Side/West Side	Lucia Lopez	Episode: "It's War, Man"
1967	The Winter's Tale	Paulina	TV movie
1978	The Last Tenant	Mrs. Farelli	TV movie
1980	Nurse	Nan Riley	TV movie
1981	ABC Afterschool Specials	Inez Marin	Episode: "Starstruck"
1982	Another World	Dr. Emily Cole	Soap Opera; Unknown episodes
1983	Jacobo Timerman: Prisoner Without a Name, Cell Without a Number	Unknown	TV movie
1986	Amazing Stories	Marie / Wealthy Lady	Episode: "Gather Ye Acorns"
1989	CBS Schoolbreak Special	Marian Rosenberg	Episode: "A Matter of Conscience"
1990	Murder in Black and White	Dr. Bromberg	TV movie
1991	L.A. Law	Assistant District Attorney Ellen Kennedy	Episode: "Pump it up"
1991	A Marriage: Georgia O'Keeffe and Alfred Stieglitz	Dolly Stieglitz	TV movie
1991	In a Child's Name	Frances Silvano	TV movie
1992	Baby Talk	Unknown	Episodes: "Scenes from a Marriage"
1992–1993	Law & Order	Carla Bowman	2 episodes
1993	Love, Honor & Obey: The Last Mafia Marriage	Rose Profaci	TV movie
1993	Northern Exposure	Nadine Fleischman	Episode: "Birds of a Feather"
1995	Everyman	Casting Advisor	
1996	The Prosecutors	Unknown	TV movie
1996–1997	New York Undercover	Carmella McNamara	4 episodes
1997	All My Children	Judge Brauer	Soap Opera; Unknown episodes
1994–1998	Law & Order	Deirdre Powell	3 episodes
1999	Black and Blue	Ann Benedetto	TV movie
1999	Witness Protection	Mrs. O'Connor, Cindy's Mother	TV movie
2004	The Jury	Jackie Ochs	Episode: "Too Jung to Die"
2008	The American Experience	Family Member	
2010	Frontline	Herself	Episode: Digital Nation"
2011	The Good Wife	Loni Goslin	Episode: "In Sickness"
2000–2011	Law & Order: Special Victims Unit	Judge Lena Petrovsky	43 episodes
2013	Homeland	Grandma Lois	Episode: "Tin Man Is Down"

=== Stage ===
Year	Title	Role	Notes
1961	Becket	Gwendolyn	
1961	A Far Country	Replacement Performer	
1964	Fiddler on the Roof	Tzeitel	
1970	Company	Casting Director	
1971	Follies	Casting Director	
1973	A Little Night Music	Casting Director	
1973	Shelter	Gloria	
1976	Pacific Overtures	Casting Director	
1978	On the Twentieth Century	Casting Director	
1979	Evita	Casting Director	
1979	Sweeney Todd	Casting Director	
1981	Merrily We Roll Along	Casting Director	
1982	A Doll's Life	Casting Director	
1987	Into The Woods	Casting Director	
2014	Absence	Helen Bastion	

== Awards and nominations ==
Year	Award	Category	Film or series	Result
1988	Casting Society of America Artios Award	Best Casting for a Feature Film, Drama	The Last Emperor	Won
2009	Strasbourg International Film Festival Award	Best Actress	Beautiful Hills of Brooklyn	Won
