= Chester Lake (Law & Order: Special Victims Unit) =

Fictional character on "Law & Order: Special Victims Unit"

- Law & Order character
- First appearance: "Outsider" (season 8)
- Last appearance: "Cold" (season 9)
- Portrayed by: Adam Beach

In-universe information
- Title: NYPD Detective
- Partner: Fin Tutuola
- Seasons: 8, 9

Detective Chester Lake is a fictional character played by Adam Beach in the American crime drama television series Law & Order: Special Victims Unit on NBC. Lake is the first detective of Native American descent on a Law & Order series. He is first seen during the eighth season working with the Brooklyn division of the New York Police Department's Special Victims Unit. At the end of the season, he transfers to the Manhattan SVU, where he is partnered with Fin Tutuola (Ice-T) during the ninth season. Lake is arrested in the season finale, "Cold", after he kills a fellow police officer.

Beach met series creator Dick Wolf while filming Bury My Heart at Wounded Knee and signed on as a regular to the show shortly afterwards. However, it was quickly felt that there were too many detectives in the cast, and the character of Lake was written out after only one season. The character was unpopular with viewers, and reception of Lake was generally negative.

== Character biography ==
Lake is of Native American ancestry, Mohawk nation, and his family has lived in New York City for generations. Every male member of his family for the preceding three generations was an ironworker. At some point in the past, he was a foster child.

Lake used to compete as an amateur mixed martial artist with the fight name "Naptime", but abandoned it as a career possibility after tearing his anterior cruciate ligament. Lake is first seen in the eighth season episode "Outsider" as a Brooklyn Special Victims Unit detective who helps Fin Tutuola (Ice-T) work a case involving an alleged rape at the college Fin's son is attending. In the season finale, "Screwed", Captain Donald Cragen (Dann Florek) transfers Lake to Manhattan SVU to help relieve a heavy caseload while several of the detectives in the unit are being investigated. Lake is partnered with Tutuola when he arrives.

Lake becomes a main character in Season 9. In "Avatar", Lake is shown to be a collector of rare books. During that same episode, it is revealed that Gregory Searle (Kevin Tighe), the owner of a bookstore he frequents, is a rapist and kidnapper of young girls. As seen in "Harm", Lake often suffers from insomnia, which he tries to combat by taking nighttime walks through the city. He has picked up bits of information during his walks, such as the noises of particular industrial plants and a knowledge of which restaurants are favored by different ethnic groups, that have occasionally been used by the squad to advance their investigations. During "Svengali", Lake suffers a concussion when a pipe bomb hidden in a pizza goes off in the squad room. Despite his protests, he is transported to the hospital. While going over surveillance, he finds the bomber who attacked Benson at her apartment and calls in reinforcements to help her. In "Fight", Lake uses his past as a foster child to help two brothers who were falsely accused of rape and murder. After the brothers were found innocent, Lake pulls strings to ensure that they remain in college and plans to reunite them with their mother, a recovering heroin addict. After she dies of an overdose, Lake takes them to Red Lobster in her place, since she wanted to do that herself.

In the season 9 finale, "Cold", it is revealed that Lake attends a meeting of individuals called the Vidocq Society in Philadelphia who share information on "cold" murder cases. He later disappears after shooting and killing a fellow police officer who was suspected of raping two illegal immigrants a decade earlier. Lake, who found the surviving victim, is arrested for murder. However, more evidence leads to the discovery that Lake was shot at by someone else and killed the other cop in self-defense, and this leads to a second suspect, Thomas Crane (Jack Gwaltney), a fellow NYPD officer with a history of brutality. Following a jury deadlock in the case of the second suspect, Lake is found standing over Crane's body and is arrested again for murder.

== Development ==
Adam Beach met series creator Dick Wolf while filming the Wolf-produced film Bury My Heart at Wounded Knee. Though the role was only intended to be a guest-starring role for a single episode, Wolf was so impressed by Beach's commitment, dedication, and total immersion in one of the film's central roles that he offered Beach a regular role on SVU. Beach was initially excited about the part, calling it his "dream role," and saying he felt like it showed that he could do great work in television and feature films. He also felt that it would allow new opportunities for Native American actors on television shows.

It quickly became apparent to the show runners, however, that Lake was not working out as a character. It was felt there were too many detectives on the show, and that this was taking away screen time from Beach's fellow cast members, Richard Belzer and Ice-T. It was decided at the end of the ninth season to write Lake out of the series in an effort to bring the focus of the show back to the core cast. Neal Baer said the departure was mutual and amicable, and Beach said that he enjoyed his year on SVU but was looking forward to "new adventures."

== Reception ==
Reaction to Lake was mixed. Susan Green and Randee Dawn, writers of Law & Order: Special Victims Unit: The Unofficial Companion, felt that Lake was never fully accepted by SVU viewers. They felt his presence seemed designed to phase out one of two longtime favorites in the cast, either Richard Belzer or Ice-T, and that this did nothing to endear him to the audience. Molly Willow of The Columbus Dispatch agreed that Lake took away time from Belzer's character, John Munch, and, on the announcement of Beach's departure, said that "Munch is better anyway."

However, a reviewer for Eye For Film wrote, "This new blood on the beat provides extra scope for conflict and it is Lake who lies at the heart of the gripping Season finale Cold, although given how well-developed the existing players already are, it's hard for Beach to make much of an impact." Entertainment Weekly said, "Still, he left quite the impression: His character was the first Native American detective in the long-running franchise, which is memorable enough in its own right. But Beach also ended up exiting the show in an explosive way after his character killed another detective." Screen Rant aggregated Reddit fan opinions, writing, "Chester Lake (Adam Beach) was a dynamic, intellectual detective who often brought character and emotion to his episodes... It was disappointing to some fans to see Lake written off the show as a killer."
