= Peter Leto =

American television director and producer

- Born: Peter Herman Leto
- Occupation(s): Television director, television producer
- Years active: 1998–present

Peter Herman Leto is an American television director and television producer. He is best known for directing work on Law & Order: Special Victims Unit, in which he also served as a unit production manager, first assistant director, second assistant director, co-producer, producer, supervising producer and co-executive producer.

Besides Law & Order: Special Victims Unit, Leto's other television directing work includes A Gifted Man, Under the Dome, Witches of East End, Arrow, Falling Skies, Agent Carter, Designated Survivor, Emergence, Deputy and The Equalizer.

Leto also worked as the second assistant director on the feature films The Last Days of Disco, Rounders, Passion of Mind, Boiler Room and the Law & Order television film Exiled: A Law & Order Movie.
