= Diane Neal =

American actress (born 1975)

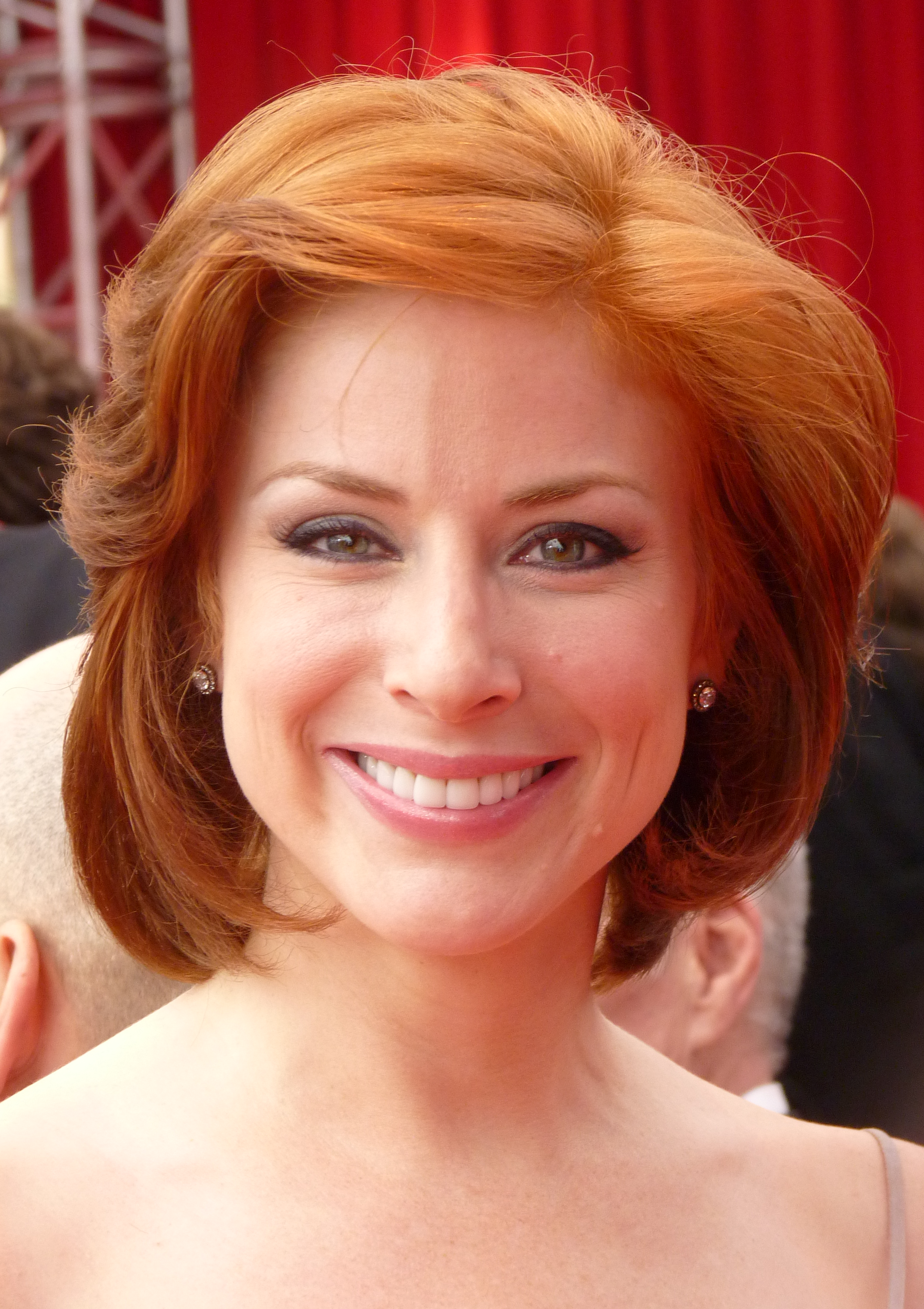
- Neal at the 2012 Monte-Carlo Television Festival
- Born: November 17, 1976 (age 49); Alexandria, Virginia, U.S.
- Citizenship: Israel; United States
- Education: Harvard University (AA)
- Occupations: Actress; model; podcaster
- Years active: 2001–present
- Notable credits: Casey Novak on Law & Order: Special Victims Unit; Abigail Borin on NCIS
- Political party: Independent
- Other political affiliations: Libertarian; Progressive
- Spouse: Marcus O. Fitzgerald (m. 2005; div. 2014)

Diane Neal (born November 17, 1976) is an American-Israeli actress. She is best known for portraying New York Assistant District Attorney Casey Novak in the television series Law & Order: Special Victims Unit from 2003 to 2012. She is also known for portraying Coast Guard Investigative Service (CGIS) Special Agent Abigail Borin in the NCIS franchise.

== Early life ==
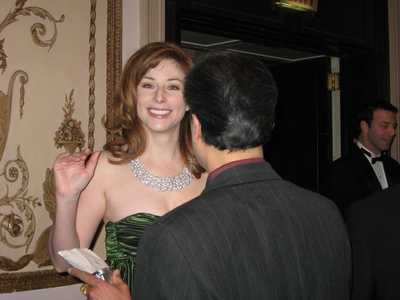
Neal in 2008

Neal was born in Alexandria, Virginia, the youngest of three daughters to Colleen Neal, a math teacher or professor of Jewish descent, and Christopher "Chris" Neal, a federal attorney of Irish descent. She was raised in Littleton, Arapahoe County, Colorado, with her older sisters Leigh and Erin. and Ohio. After Neal graduated from Littleton's Heritage High School, she moved to Hawaii to attend college, but later left school to become a model and travel. Neal started modeling for Shiseido and Pond's skin-care ads. After deciding to resume her education, Neal began attending Harvard University's Extension School in 2009, and graduated with an associate degree in May 2018.

== Career ==
=== Acting ===
Neal first appeared on Law & Order: Special Victims Unit as a guest star, playing a rapist in the Season 3 episode "Ridicule". Neal first appeared as Assistant District Attorney Casey Novak in the show's fifth season, replacing Stephanie March, who played Alexandra Cabot.

Neal portrayed Novak through the end of Season 9, when the character exited the series after being censured by the New York State Bar. In 2011, Neal reprised her role as Novak in the Season 12 episode "Reparations", when Novak returned to SVU as their temporary ADA. After that appearance, she became a recurring character in Season 13. She was last seen in the episode "Valentine's Day". Neal said of her return to the series in Season 13 to TV Guide, "It's back on track to what the original SVU was intended to be, which is about sex crimes and crimes against children, it's got more of a nitty-gritty feel." She says that March's and her return to the fictional universe of the series provided a familiarity for viewers following original cast member Chris Meloni's departure. "I think they should put us in the court room together!" she says about March.

In 2021, Neal starred as Peggy Sue Thomas in the Lifetime movie Circle of Deception.

=== Congressional run ===
On February 6, 2018, Neal announced that she would run for the U.S. House of Representatives in New York's 19th congressional district as an independent. She described her political views as "a little libertarian, I'm a lot liberal, mostly progressive, but I have this amazing ability to be able to take really complicated policy and break it down into edible sound bites, which is something most progressive liberals cannot do." Neal finished with 1% of the vote.

=== Podcast ===
On January 14, 2022, Neal announced that she would be the host of a new comedy and talk podcast named "Hear Say with Diane Neal". The podcast is intended to "amuse and enlighten".

== Personal life ==
On July 9, 2005, Neal married Irish former model and engineer Marcus O. Fitzgerald in a ceremony in the Dominican Republic. Neal and Fitzgerald divorced in 2014.

Neal was later involved in a relationship with magician JB Benn. It ended acrimoniously, and in November 2019, Neal became the plaintiff in a lawsuit in which she made allegations against Benn including fraud and identity theft, and she claimed Benn had subjected her to physical and sexual abuse.

In 2013, Neal was involved in a car crash which fractured her spine. In announcing her 2018 Congressional candidacy, Neal indicated that the long recuperation from her injuries had caused her to place her acting career on hold.

In 2023, Neal moved to Israel and became an Israeli citizen.

== Filmography ==
=== Film ===
Year	Title	Role	Notes
2002	Asterix & Obelix: Mission Cleopatra	Cleopatra (voice)	English version
2003	Dracula II: Ascension	Elizabeth Blaine	Video
2003	Second Born	Natasha	
2005	Dracula III: Legacy	Elizabeth Blaine	Video
2007	BelzerVizion	Dr. Ryan	Short film
2011	Dirty Movie	Nancy	
2013	Newlyweeds	Manny	
2013	Mr. Jones	The Scholar	
2013	Santorini Blue	Florist—"Flowers of the World"	
2014	After	Kat	
2014	A Warden's Ransom	Warden Samantha Brandt	
2015	The Emissary	Christine	Short film
2021	Circle of Deception	Peggy Sue Thomas	

=== Television ===
Year	Title	Role	Notes
2001	Ed	Vanessa	"Loyalties"
2001	Fling	Prudence Fisher	"At the End of the Day"
2001	Law & Order: Special Victims Unit	Amelia Chase	"Ridicule"
2002	The American Embassy	Molly	"Pilot"
2002	Hack	Patricia Bennet	"Husbands and Wives"
2003	Future Tense		TV film
2003–2012	Law & Order: Special Victims Unit	A.D.A. Casey Novak	Main cast: 2003–2008, recurring role: 2011–2012
2005	Law & Order: Trial by Jury	A.D.A. Casey Novak	"Day"
2008	30 Rock	Erin	"Reunion"
2009	My Fake Fiancé	Bonnie	TV film
2010	White Collar	Kimberly Rice	"Front Man"
2010–2014	NCIS	CGIS Special Agent Abigail Borin	Recurring role: Seasons 7–12; "Jurisdiction", "Ships in the Night", "Safe Harbor", "Lost at Sea", "The Namesake", "Oil & Water", "The San Dominick"
2012	A Gifted Man	Attorney Kim Fletcher	"In Case of Complications"
2012–2014	Suits	Allison Holt	"Break Point", "Blood in the Water", "Rewind"; "No Way Out"
2013	Captain Blackout	Daphne	TV film
2013	This Magic Moment	Helena Harris	TV film
2014	Power	Cynthia Sheridan	Recurring role
2015	NCIS: New Orleans	CGIS Special Agent Abigail Borin	"The Abyss", "The Walking Dead", "Rock-a-Bye Baby"
2015	The Following	Lisa Campbell	"Demons", "A Simple Trade", "Dead or Alive", "The Reckoning"
2015	Blue Bloods	Kelly Blake	"Hold Outs"
