= Stephanie March =

American actress (born 1974)

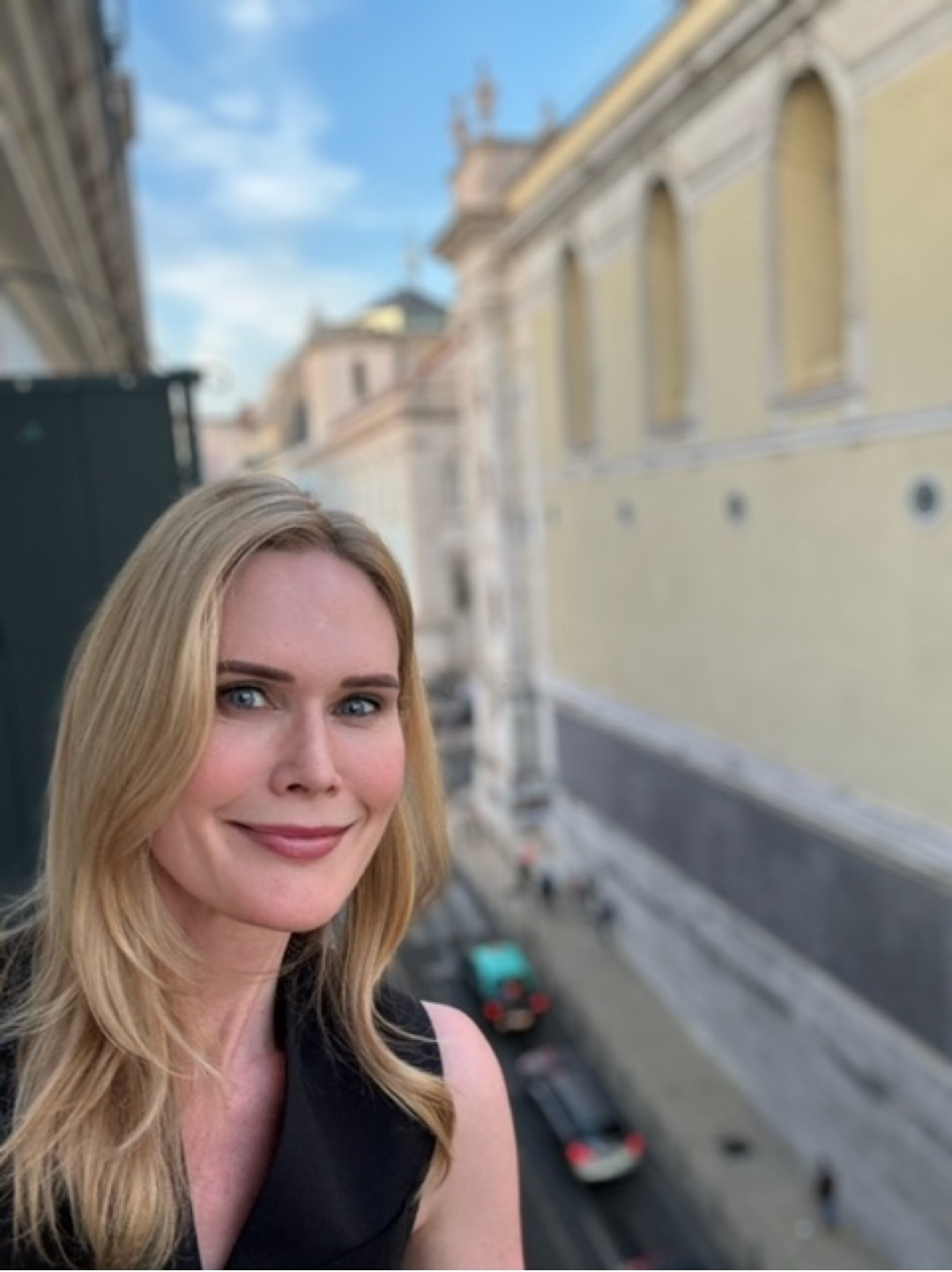
- March in 2024
- Born: Stephanie Caroline March; July 23, 1974 (age 52); Dallas, Texas, U.S.
- Occupations: Actress; activist
- Years active: 1997–present
- Spouse(s): Bobby Flay (m. 2005; div. 2015) Dan Benton (m. 2017)

Stephanie Caroline March (born July 23, 1974) is an American actress and activist. She is known for playing Alexandra Cabot in the NBC crime drama series Law & Order: Special Victims Unit (2000–2018) and its spinoff media. She is also recognized for her activism towards abuse victims, education, and women's rights.

March has appeared in the films Head of State (2003), Mr. & Mrs. Smith (2005), Falling for Grace (2006), The Treatment (2006), Jesse Stone: Night Passage (2006), Confessions of a Shopaholic (2009), and Origin (2023). She also executive produced and starred in the independent film The Social Ones (2019). Her continued television roles include Carol Blanton on the Adult Swim miniseries Neon Joe, Werewolf Hunter (2015), Debora Green in the Lifetime film A House on Fire (2021), and Akira on the superhero series Naomi (2022), and Angelica Wyatt in Amazon Prime's miniseries Shelter (2023).

== Early life ==
March was born in Dallas, Texas, the daughter of John and Laura March, and has a sister, Charlotte. She attended McCulloch Middle School in Highland Park, and Highland Park High School, where Law & Order's Angie Harmon, who played the role of an assistant district attorney on Law & Order, attended concurrently. After her parents' divorce, her mother married Robert Derby.

In 1996, March graduated from Northwestern University, where she was a member of Kappa Alpha Theta sorority. At Northwestern University, March played Helena in A Midsummer Night's Dream in Chicago, where she continued to pursue her stage career.

== Career ==
=== Beginnings and Law & Order ===
In 1997, March made her screen debut in an episode of the CBS series Early Edition. In 1999, March moved to New York and made her Broadway debut in a production of Arthur Miller's Death of a Salesman with Brian Dennehy. She later co-starred in the television film based on the play.

March is best known for her role as Assistant District Attorney Alexandra Cabot on the NBC crime legal drama series Law & Order: Special Victims Unit, who she played as a main character from 2000 to 2003, and reprised in recurring appearances on the show until 2018. On landing the role, March told People magazine "I'm not sure that when I got the job, I intended for this to happen, but once I had the job, I became pretty deliberate about it because the subject matter I found disturbing and compelling. It was just not something I could put away when I came home at night from work. So, I became quite deliberate in my choices of how I wanted to participate and how I wanted to use my voice." The character of Cabot and March's work has earned widespread acclaim, and is often considered one of the best characters and acting performances in the Law & Order series. In 2003, at the 8th Golden Satellite Awards, she and her Law & Order: Special Victims Unit co-stars were nominated for the Satellite Award for Best Television Series – Drama.

March reprised the role as Cabot, now the Bureau Chief ADA of the homicide bureau, on the short-lived NBC courtroom drama Conviction, which debuted in spring 2006. The show, which saw March in a leading role and was part of the Law & Order universe, was cancelled after one 13-episode season following a negative reception from critics and audiences. Despite this, Entertain your Brain wrote that "... March, she has already proven herself on Special Victims Unit."

=== Continued film and television work ===
In 2003, March made her film debut with a supporting role in the political comedy Head of State opposite Chris Rock. She later appeared in the films Mr. & Mrs. Smith, The Treatment, and Falling for Grace, the latter two romantic comedies. March also appeared in the 2009 film The Invention of Lying as the woman Ricky Gervais's character tells the world will end unless she has sex with him. She later co-starred in the independent films Why Stop Now? and Innocence. In 2007, March performed in the Broadway premiere of Eric Bogosian's Talk Radio, starring Liev Schreiber. She also starred in Howard Korder's off-Broadway play Boy's Life alongside Jason Biggs.

March has guest-starred on 30 Rock, Grey's Anatomy, Rescue Me, and Happy Endings. She was cast as a regular character on the short-lived CBS legal comedy-drama Made in Jersey in 2012, but she left the series after the pilot episode. She starred in the 2015 Adult Swim series Neon Joe, Werewolf Hunter. March played the role of Ivanka Trump in the March 2019 Comedy Central TV movie A President Show Documentary: The Fall of Donald Trump. The 22-minute documentary is a comedic portrayal of the aftermath of Trump's imagined loss of the 2020 presidential election.

On March 9, 2019, The Social Ones premiered at the Hammer Theatre Center in San Jose, California, as part of the 2019 Cinequest Film and Creativity Festival. March is a co-executive producer and portrays one of the lead characters. Laura Kosann wrote and directed the film, which also features Richard Kind, Jackie Hoffman, Debra Jo Rupp, and Peter Scolari. The film won Cinequest's Audience Award for Best Comedy Feature. The Social Ones is an ensemble mockumentary that satirizes social media culture, including its fixation on likes, selfies, and social media influencers. The film gained additional attention because it was written, produced, and directed entirely by women. In a March 2019 interview, March explained how a mostly women's production team compared to one that is primarily run by men: "We were under budget, on time, wrapped early, had fun, zero on-set drama, zero backstage drama, and wholly supportive of one another- both in front of and behind the camera. I have never experienced such a seamless set. No ego. All warmth (meets organization, meets diligence, meets determination). Moms really should be in charge of more businesses."

In 2021, March signed with Echo Lake Entertainment, for management in all areas. She subsequently appeared in the Lifetime biographical television film A House on Fire, where she played Debora Green, a former doctor and convicted murderer. Her performance earned praise from critics and audiences; Sayantani Nath of Meaww.com wrote that the actress showed "incredible finesse and brilliance" and further wrote on March's "impressive acting and realistic depiction of Green's mental anguish and struggles."

It was announced that March would join the cast of The CW superhero series Naomi, where she was set to play the role of Akira; released in 2022, the series earned positive reviews from critics and audiences alike. On auditioning for the role, March told ComicBook.com that "When I auditioned, the role of Akira was described to me as a, quote, "Ripley-inspired intergalactic badass," and I thought, "Well, yeah, I want to do that." ... so far, I hope that's how it's come across. It's certainly been fun to play."

In 2023, March played Binky in Ava DuVernay's acclaimed biographical drama film Origin. That year, she also played the role of Angelica Wyatt in the miniseries adaptation of Harlan Coben's Shelter.

== Other work ==
March co-founded SheSpoke (formerly Rouge), a custom-made cosmetics company, with her business partner Rebecca Perkins in 2013.

March and her husband, Dan Benton, became co-producers of the Broadway musical Redwood in 2025.

== Activism and philanthropy ==
March is a philanthropist and advocate for international women's rights, focusing on reproductive rights, the right access to education, freedom from sexual violence, and fair legal representation. She currently serves on the boards of the Panzi Foundation, OneKid OneWorld, the Whitney Museum of American Art, and The Gotham Film & Media Institute. She is a longtime advocate for Planned Parenthood and previously served on the board of Planned Parenthood Global.

March is a member of the Board of Advisors for the Northwestern University School of Communication. In April 2018, March participated in a variety show fundraiser “A Starry Night” at Northwestern University for the School of Communication. In addition to March, other alumni from the school who participated included Stephen Colbert, Tony Roberts, and Dermot Mulroney.

== Personal life ==
March married celebrity chef Bobby Flay on February 20, 2005. She appeared on four of Flay's Food Network shows—Boy Meets Grill, Grill It! with Bobby Flay, Iron Chef America, and Throwdown with Bobby Flay—as a guest judge. According to media reports, March and Flay separated in March 2015 and their divorce was finalized on July 17, 2015.

March wrote an essay, published in June 2016, that detailed her experience with breast augmentation surgery in 2014 and the subsequent removal of the implants due to infection.

On September 1, 2017, March married businessman Dan Benton in Katonah, New York. She was introduced to Benton, the founder of Andor Capital, by a mutual friend in October 2015, several months after her divorce from Flay. The couple resides in the West Village in an apartment they bought in 2018.

== Filmography ==
=== Film ===
Year	Title	Role	Notes
2003	Focus Room	Kim	Short film
2003	Head of State	Nikki	
2005	Mr. & Mrs. Smith	Julie	
2006	Flannel Pajamas	Cathy	
2006	The Treatment	Julia	
2006	Copy That	Stephanie	Short film
2007	Falling for Grace	Kay Douglas	
2009	Confessions of a Shopaholic	Department Store Manager	Scene deleted
2009	The Invention of Lying	Blonde	
2012	Why Stop Now?	Trish	
2014	Innocence	Natalie Crawford	
2019	The Social Ones	Miriam Spacelli	
2023	Origin	Binky	

=== Television ===
Year	Title	Role	Notes
1997	Early Edition	Arlene	Episode: "A Bris Is Just a Bris"
2000	Death of a Salesman	Miss Forsythe	Television film
2000–2018 & 2027	Law & Order: Special Victims Unit	Alexandra Cabot	Main role (seasons 2–5, 11); Recurring role (seasons 6, 10, 13, 19 & 28)
2005	Jesse Stone: Night Passage	Cissy Hathaway	Television film
2006	Conviction	Alexandra Cabot	Main role
2006	30 Rock	Gretchen Thomas	Episode: "Blind Date"
2007	Grey's Anatomy	Jane	Episode: "Physical Attraction... Chemical Reaction"
2009	Rescue Me	Psychic	Episode: "Jimmy"
2012	Made in Jersey	Natalie Minka	Episode: "Pilot"
2013	Happy Endings	Brooke Kerkovich	Episode: "Brothas and Sisters"
2015	Neon Joe, Werewolf Hunter	Mayor Carol Blanton	Recurring role
2017	The President Show	Ivanka Trump	1 episode
2021	Solar Opposites	Defense Attorney (voice)	Episode: "The Apple Pencil Pro"
2021	A House on Fire	Debora Green	Lifetime television film
2022	Naomi	Akira	Recurring role
2023	Harlan Coben’s Shelter	Angelica Wyatt	2 episodes
