= List of Law & Order: Special Victims Unit episodes (season 20–present) =

Law & Order: Special Victims Unit, the first spin-off of Law & Order, is an American police procedural television series that focuses on crimes of sexual nature. While the victim is often murdered, this is not always the case, and victims often play prominent roles in episodes. The series frequently uses stories that are "ripped from the headlines" or based on real crimes. Such episodes take a real crime and fictionalize it by changing the details. The series premiered on NBC on September 20, 1999, and its twenty-seventh season premiered on September 25, 2025. On April 16, 2026, the show was renewed for a twenty-eighth season, which premiered on October 8 of the same year.

Most episode titles of Law & Order: Special Victims Unit between seasons one and twelve are a single word or initialism. From seasons 13–17 and from seasons 21–23 (except for two episodes from season 23), the pattern changes to one in which episodes have a title with the number of letters matching the season number (in exactly two words, seasons 13–17). From seasons 18–20, the episode titles follow no fixed pattern. From season 24 onwards, most episodes have the title spoken at some point in the episode. As of November 12, 2026, 600 episodes of Law & Order: Special Victims Unit have aired, currently in its twenty-eighth season.

== Series overview ==
Season	Episodes	Originally released		Rank	Rating
Season	Episodes	First released	Last released	Rank	Rating
1	22	September 20, 1999	May 19, 2000	30	8.8
2	21	October 20, 2000	May 11, 2001	25	9.6
3	23	September 28, 2001	May 17, 2002	12	10.4
4	25	September 27, 2002	May 16, 2003	14	10.1
5	25	September 23, 2003	May 18, 2004	18	8.7
6	23	September 21, 2004	May 24, 2005	16	9.2
7	22	September 20, 2005	May 16, 2006	18	9.2
8	22	September 19, 2006	May 22, 2007	24	7.9
9	19	September 25, 2007	May 13, 2008	22	7.6
10	22	September 23, 2008	June 2, 2009	26	6.7
11	24	September 23, 2009	May 19, 2010	—N/a	—N/a
12	24	September 22, 2010	May 18, 2011	—N/a	—N/a
13	23	September 21, 2011	May 23, 2012	—N/a	—N/a
14	24	September 26, 2012	May 22, 2013	—N/a	—N/a
15	24	September 25, 2013	May 21, 2014	—N/a	—N/a
16	23	September 24, 2014	May 20, 2015	—N/a	—N/a
17	23	September 23, 2015	May 25, 2016	—N/a	—N/a
18	21	September 21, 2016	May 24, 2017	—N/a	—N/a
19	24	September 27, 2017	May 23, 2018	30	5.6
20	24	September 27, 2018	May 16, 2019	—N/a	—N/a
21	20	September 26, 2019	April 23, 2020	—N/a	—N/a
22	16	November 12, 2020	June 3, 2021	36	5.9
23	22	September 23, 2021	May 19, 2022	40	6.3
24	22	September 22, 2022	May 18, 2023	TBA	TBA
25	13	January 18, 2024	May 16, 2024	TBA	TBA
26	22	October 3, 2024	May 15, 2025	47	8.7
27	21	September 25, 2025	May 14, 2026	39	8.7
28	TBA	October 8, 2026	TBA	TBA	TBA

== Episodes ==
=== Season 20 (2018–2019) ===
- Philip Winchester departs the cast in the season finale, "End Game".
- Michael S. Chernuchin leaves the show as executive producer at the end of the season.

Law & Order: Special Victims Unit season 20 episodes
No. overall	No. in season	Title	Directed by	Written by	Original release date	Prod. code	U.S. viewers (millions)
435	1	"Man Up"	Alex Chapple	Michael Chernuchin & Julie Martin	September 27, 2018	2001	5.09
436	2	"Man Down"	Alex Chapple	Michael Chernuchin & Julie Martin	September 27, 2018	2004	5.09
437	3	"Zero Tolerance"	Michael Pressman	Richard Sweren & Céline C. Robinson	October 4, 2018	2002	4.21
438	4	"Revenge"	Martha Mitchell	Michael Chernuchin & Lawrence Kaplow	October 11, 2018	2003	4.44
439	5	"Accredo"	Jean de Segonzac	Julie Martin & Brianna Yellen	October 18, 2018	2005	3.95
440	6	"Exile"	Stephanie Marquardt	Michael Chernuchin & Allison Intrieri	October 25, 2018	2006	4.22
441	7	"Caretaker"	Jono Oliver	Jordan Barsky	November 1, 2018	2007	4.62
442	8	"Hell's Kitchen"	Monica Raymund	Richard Sweren & Ryan Causey	November 8, 2018	2008	4.44
443	9	"Mea Culpa"	Mariska Hargitay	Michael Chernuchin & Julie Martin	November 15, 2018	2009	4.00
444	10	"Alta Kockers"	Alex Chapple	Michael Chernuchin	November 29, 2018	2010	3.88
445	11	"Plastic"	Fred Berner	Lawrence Kaplow & Brianna Yellen	January 10, 2019	2011	4.00
446	12	"Dear Ben"	Jean de Segonzac	Julie Martin & Matt Klypka	January 17, 2019	2012	4.24
447	13	"A Story of More Woe"	Ray McKinnon	Julie Martin & Céline C. Robinson	January 31, 2019	2013	4.60
448	14	"Part 33"	Alex Chapple	Michael Chernuchin	February 7, 2019	2014	4.15
449	15	"Brothel"	Michael Pressman	Julie Martin & Ryan Causey	February 14, 2019	2015	4.18
450	16	"Facing Demons"	Timothy Busfield	Richard Sweren & Allison Intrieri	February 21, 2019	2016	4.00
451	17	"Missing"	Constantine Makris	Michael Chernuchin & Matt Klypka	March 14, 2019	2017	4.11
452	18	"Blackout"	Chris Misiano	Peter Blauner	March 21, 2019	2018	4.29
453	19	"Dearly Beloved"	Lucy Liu	Richard Sweren & Allison Intrieri	April 4, 2019	2019	3.93
454	20	"The Good Girl"	Jean de Segonzac	Lawrence Kaplow & Brianna Yellen	April 11, 2019	2020	3.94
455	21	"Exchange"	Michael Pressman	Michael Chernuchin & Jordan Barsky	April 25, 2019	2021	3.63
456	22	"Diss"	Alex Chapple	Michael Chernuchin & Allison Intrieri	May 2, 2019	2022	3.95
457	23	"Assumptions"	Fred Berner	Teleplay by : Julie Martin & Richard Sweren; Story by : Michael Chernuchin	May 9, 2019	2023	3.66
458	24	"End Game"	Alex Chapple	Michael Chernuchin & Julie Martin	May 16, 2019	2024	3.58

=== Season 21 (2019–2020) ===
- Warren Leight returns and takes over as executive producer once again.
- Jamie Gray Hyder joins as a recurring guest for the first seven episodes portraying Officer Katriona "Kat" Tamin. She is promoted to the main cast in the eighth episode.
- Demore Barnes had a continuous arc as Deputy Chief Christian Garland starting with "Down Low in Hell's Kitchen".
- Production on the twenty-first season of Law & Order: Special Victims Unit was halted amid the COVID-19 pandemic in March 2020, with 20 of 24 planned episodes finished, making the last completed episode an earlier season finale than planned.

Law & Order: Special Victims Unit season 21 episodes
No. overall	No. in season	Title	Directed by	Written by	Original release date	Prod. code	U.S. viewers (millions)
459	1	"I'm Going to Make You a Star"	Norberto Barba	Warren Leight & Peter Blauner	September 26, 2019	2101	3.84
460	2	"The Darkest Journey Home"	Jean de Segonzac	Julie Martin & Warren Leight	October 3, 2019	2102	3.44
461	3	"Down Low in Hell's Kitchen"	Timothy Busfield	Teleplay by : Monet Hurst-Mendoza & Brendan Feeney; Story by : Lisa Takeuchi Cullen, Julie Martin, & Warren Leight	October 10, 2019	2103	3.42
462	4	"The Burden of Our Choices"	Martha Mitchell	Teleplay by : Julie Martin & Micharne Cloughley; Story by : Warren Leight & Julie Martin	October 17, 2019	2104	3.46
463	5	"At Midnight in Manhattan"	Peter Werner	Teleplay by : Kathy Dobie & Micharne Cloughley; Story by : Brianna Yellen	October 24, 2019	2105	3.73
464	6	"Murdered at a Bad Address"	Michael Smith	Teleplay by : Denis Hamill; Story by : Denis Hamill, Julie Martin, & Warren Leight	October 31, 2019	2106	3.98
465	7	"Counselor, It's Chinatown"	Leslie Hope	Teleplay by : Kathy Dobie & Lisa Takeuchi Cullen; Story by : Julie Martin & Warren Leight	November 7, 2019	2107	3.59
466	8	"We Dream of Machine Elves"	Jonathan Herron	Teleplay by : Brendan Feeney & Monet Hurst-Mendoza; Story by : Julie Martin & Warren Leight	November 14, 2019	2108	3.79
467	9	"Can't Be Held Accountable"	Norberto Barba	Teleplay by : Brianna Yellen; Story by : Julie Martin & Warren Leight	November 21, 2019	2109	3.81
468	10	"Must Be Held Accountable"	Laurie Collyer	Teleplay by : Brianna Yellen & Denis Hamill; Story by : Warren Leight & Julie Martin	January 9, 2020	2110	3.70
469	11	"She Paints for Vengeance"	Mariska Hargitay	Teleplay by : Kathy Dobie; Story by : Kathy Dobie & Julie Martin	January 16, 2020	2111	3.60
470	12	"The Longest Night of Rain"	Michael Smith	Teleplay by : Peter Blauner; Story by : Peter Blauner & Warren Leight	January 30, 2020	2112	3.63
471	13	"Redemption in Her Corner"	Batán Silva	Teleplay by : Monet Hurst-Mendoza & Brianna Yellen; Story by : Julie Martin & Warren Leight	February 6, 2020	2113	3.25
472	14	"I Deserve Some Loving Too"	Jean de Segonzac	Teleplay by : Denis Hamill; Story by : Denis Hamill, Julie Martin, & Warren Leight	February 13, 2020	2114	3.32
473	15	"Swimming with the Sharks"	Martha Mitchell	Teleplay by : Lisa Takeuchi Cullen; Story by : Lisa Takeuchi Cullen, Warren Leight, & Julie Martin	February 20, 2020	2115	3.36
474	16	"Eternal Relief from Pain"	Jean de Segonzac	Peter Blauner	February 27, 2020	2116	3.30
475	17	"Dance Lies and Video Tape"	Leslie Hope	Teleplay by : Micharne Cloughley & Brendan Feeney; Story by : Brendan Feeney, Julie Martin, & Warren Leight	March 26, 2020	2117	3.80
476	18	"Garland's Baptism by Fire"	Norberto Barba	Cheryl L. Davis & Micharne Cloughley	April 2, 2020	2118	3.53
477	19	"Solving for the Unknowns"	Christopher Misiano	Brianna Yellen & Kathy Dobie	April 16, 2020	2119	4.06
478	20	"The Things We Have to Lose"	Juan Campanella	Warren Leight & Julie Martin	April 23, 2020	2120	3.69

=== Season 22 (2020–2021) ===
- Demore Barnes joins the main cast as Deputy Chief Christian Garland.
- Filming for the season started on Monday, September 14, 2020.
- Christopher Meloni (Det. Elliot Stabler) returns as a special guest star in the episode "Return of the Prodigal Son," making this his first appearance on the show after his exit in the season 12 finale ("Smoked").

Law & Order: Special Victims Unit season 22 episodes
No. overall	No. in season	Title	Directed by	Written by	Original release date	Prod. code	U.S. viewers (millions)
479	1	"Guardians and Gladiators"	Norberto Barba	Teleplay by : Brendan Feeney, Denis Hamill, & Monet Hurst-Mendoza; Story by : Warren Leight & Julie Martin	November 12, 2020	2201	3.02
480	2	"Ballad of Dwight and Irena"	Martha Mitchell	Teleplay by : Brendan Feeney & Julie Martin; Story by : Brendan Feeney & Monet Hurst-Mendoza	November 19, 2020	2202	2.95
481	3	"Remember Me in Quarantine"	Juan Campanella	Julie Martin & Warren Leight	December 3, 2020	2203	4.18
482	4	"Sightless in a Savage Land"	Norberto Barba	Matt Klypka, Denis Hamill, Julie Martin, & Warren Leight	January 7, 2021	2204	3.86
483	5	"Turn Me on Take Me Private"	Juan Campanella	Teleplay by : Monet Hurst-Mendoza, Victoria Pollack, Julie Martin, & Warren Leight; Story by : Victoria Pollack & Monet Hurst-Mendoza	January 14, 2021	2205	3.83
484	6	"The Long Arm of the Witness"	Martha Mitchell	Teleplay by : Denis Hamill & Warren Leight; Story by : Denis Hamill & Micharne Cloughley	January 21, 2021	2206	3.74
485	7	"Hunt, Trap, Rape and Release"	Batán Silva	Teleplay by : Kathy Dobie & Monet Hurst-Mendoza; Story by : Kathy Dobie & Julie Martin	February 18, 2021	2207	4.13
486	8	"The Only Way Out Is Through"	Martha Mitchell	Teleplay by : Micharne Cloughley & Kathy Dobie; Story by : Brianna Yellen	February 25, 2021	2208	3.78
487	9	"Return of the Prodigal Son"	Juan J. Campanella	Warren Leight & Julie Martin	April 1, 2021	2209	8.03
488	10	"Welcome to the Pedo Motel"	Jean de Segonzac	Teleplay by : Denis Hamill; Story by : Denis Hamil, Julie Martin, & Warren Leight	April 8, 2021	2210	4.89
489	11	"Our Words Will Not Be Heard"	Batán Silva	Melody Cooper	April 15, 2021	2211	4.73
490	12	"In the Year We All Fell Down"	Jean de Segonzac	Teleplay by : Julie Martin & Warren Leight; Story by : Julie Martin, Warren Leight, & Kathy Dobie	April 22, 2021	2212	4.50
491	13	"Trick-Rolled at the Moulin"	Batán Silva	Teleplay by : Brendan Feeney & Brianna Yellen; Story by : Warren Leight & Julie Martin	May 13, 2021	2213	4.45
492	14	"Post-Graduate Psychopath"	Norberto Barba	Teleplay by : Brianna Yellen & Micharne Cloughley; Story by : Brianna Yellen & Warren Leight	May 20, 2021	2214	4.33
493	15	"What Can Happen In the Dark"	Jean de Segonzac	Micharne Cloughley	May 27, 2021	2215	4.38
494	16	"Wolves in Sheep's Clothing"	Norberto Barba	Teleplay by : Kathy Dobie & Christian Tyler; Story by : Denis Hamill and Julie Martin & Warren Leight	June 3, 2021	2216	4.23

=== Season 23 (2021–2022) ===
- This was the last season to feature Jamie Gray Hyder and Demore Barnes as regulars.
- Octavio Pisano joins the main cast.
- Christopher Meloni, Danielle Mone Truitt and Ainsley Seiger have overarching appearances in a recurring capacity (Law & Order: Organized Crime crossovers).
- Warren Leight leaves the show as executive producer at the end of the season for the second time.

Law & Order: Special Victims Unit season 23 episodes
No. overall	No. in season	Title	Directed by	Written by	Original release date	Prod. code	U.S. viewers (millions)
495	1	"And the Empire Strikes Back"	Norberto Barba	Warren Leight & Julie Martin & Bryan Goluboff	September 23, 2021	2301	5.57
496	2	"Never Turn Your Back on Them"	Norberto Barba	Teleplay by : Julie Martin & Bryan Goluboff; Story by : Warren Leight	September 23, 2021	2302	5.57
497	3	"I Thought You Were on My Side"	John Behring	Teleplay by : Julie Martin & Warren Leight; Story by : Bryan Goluboff	September 30, 2021	2303	4.66
498	4	"One More Tale of Two Victims"	Michael Pressman	Teleplay by : Denis Hamill & Monet Hurst-Mendoza; Story by : Denis Hamill & Bryan Goluboff	October 7, 2021	2304	3.88
499	5	"Fast Times @DIGGYSPENTHOUSE"	Martha Mitchell	Brianna Yellen & Brendan Feeney	October 14, 2021	2305	3.96
500	6	"The Five Hundredth Episode"	Juan J. Campanella	Teleplay by : Brianna Yellen & Julie Martin; Story by : Brianna Yellen & Warren Leight	October 21, 2021	2306	3.89
501	7	"They'd Already Disappeared"	Bethany Rooney	Kathy Dobie & Micharne Cloughley	November 4, 2021	2307	4.42
502	8	"Nightmares in Drill City"	Norberto Barba	Bryan Goluboff	November 11, 2021	2308	3.71
503	9	"People vs. Richard Wheatley"	Michael Smith	Teleplay by : Brendan Feeney & Monet Hurst-Mendoza & Candice Sanchez McFarlane; Story by : Julie Martin & Warren Leight	December 9, 2021	2309	3.49
504	10	"Silent Night, Hateful Night"	Norberto Barba	Teleplay by : Julie Martin & Kathy Dobie & Warren Leight; Story by : Warren Leight	January 6, 2022	2310	4.08
505	11	"Burning with Rage Forever"	Mary Lambert	Brianna Yellen & Brendan Feeney	January 13, 2022	2311	4.22
506	12	"Tommy Baker's Hardest Fight"	Ed Bianchi	Candice Sanchez McFarlane & Bryan Goluboff	January 20, 2022	2312	4.31
507	13	"If I Knew Then What I Know Now"	Juan J. Campanella	Teleplay by : Micharne Cloughley & Julie Martin; Story by : Micharne Cloughley & Warren Leight	February 24, 2022	2313	5.15
508	14	"Video Killed the Radio Star"	Alex Zakrzewski	Teleplay by : Denis Hamill & Monet Hurst-Mendoza; Story by : Warren Leight & Julie Martin	March 3, 2022	2314	4.50
509	15	"Promising Young Gentlemen"	David Grossman	Teleplay by : Kathy Dobie & Candice Sanchez McFarlane & Brianna Yellen; Story by : Julie Martin & Warren Leight	March 10, 2022	2315	4.51
510	16	"Sorry If It Got Weird for You"	Leslie Hope	Teleplay by : Brendan Feeney & Matt Klypka; Story by : Bryan Goluboff & Brendan Feeney	March 17, 2022	2316	4.71
511	17	"Once Upon a Time in El Barrio"	Oscar René Lozoya II	Teleplay by : Denis Hamill & Monet Hurst-Mendoza; Story by : Bryan Goluboff & Denis Hamill	April 7, 2022	2317	4.33
512	18	"Eighteen Wheels a Predator"	Martha Mitchell	Teleplay by : Brianna Yellen & Monet Hurst-Mendoza; Story by : Kathy Dobie	April 14, 2022	2318	4.74
513	19	"Tangled Strands of Justice"	Jean de Segonzac	Teleplay by : Warren Leight & Julie Martin; Story by : Brendan Feeney	April 28, 2022	2319	4.89
514	20	"Did You Believe in Miracles?"	Pratibha Parmar	Teleplay by : Micharne Cloughley & Victoria Pollack; Story by : Micharne Cloughley & Candice Sanchez McFarlane	May 5, 2022	2320	4.90
515	21	"Confess Your Sins to Be Free"	Norberto Barba	Teleplay by : Julie Martin & Christian Tyler; Story by : Denis Hamill & Warren Leight	May 12, 2022	2321	4.50
516	22	"A Final Call at Forlini's Bar"	Juan J. Campanella	Warren Leight & Julie Martin	May 19, 2022	2322	4.52

=== Season 24 (2022–2023) ===
- Molly Burnett joins in a recurring capacity in episodes 2–6, portraying Detective Grace Muncy. She is promoted to the main cast in the seventh episode, but departed the show in the season finale, "All Pain Is One Malady".
- David Graziano joins the crew as showrunner.
- Kelli Giddish (Det. Amanda Rollins) departed the series in the ninth episode, "And a Trauma in a Pear Tree".

Law & Order: Special Victims Unit season 24 episodes
No. overall	No. in season	Title	Directed by	Written by	Original release date	Prod. code	U.S. viewers (millions)
517	1	"Gimme Shelter – Part Two"	Jean de Segonzac	Rick Eid & Gwen Sigan	September 22, 2022	2403	5.47
518	2	"The One You Feed"	Norberto Barba	David Graziano & Julie Martin	September 29, 2022	2401	4.62
519	3	"Mirror Effect"	Michael Smith	Teleplay by : Julie Martin & Margaret Rose Lester; Story by : David Graziano & Julie Martin	October 6, 2022	2402	4.16
520	4	"The Steps We Cannot Take"	Juan J. Campanella	Brianna Yellen & Kathy Dobie	October 13, 2022	2404	4.36
521	5	"Breakwater"	Jean de Segonzac	Teleplay by : Denis Hamill & Monet Hurst-Mendoza; Story by : Denis Hamill	October 27, 2022	2405	4.42
522	6	"Controlled Burn"	Oscar René Lozoya II	Teleplay by : David Graziano & Nolan Dunbar; Story by : David Graziano & Julie Martin	November 3, 2022	2406	3.90
523	7	"Dead Ball"	Michael Smith	Brendan Feeney & Kathy Dobie & Gabriel Vallejo	November 10, 2022	2407	4.12
524	8	"A Better Person"	Michael Pressman	Teleplay by : Brianna Yellen & Margaret Rose Lester; Story by : David Graziano	November 17, 2022	2408	4.95
525	9	"And a Trauma in a Pear Tree"	Norberto Barba	David Graziano & Julie Martin	December 8, 2022	2409	4.97
526	10	"Jumped In"	Martha Mitchell	Teleplay by : Brendan Feeney & Monet Hurst-Mendoza; Story by : Kadia Saraf & Terry Serpico	January 5, 2023	2410	5.49
527	11	"Soldier Up"	Jonathan Herron	David Graziano & Julie Martin	January 12, 2023	2411	5.13
528	12	"Blood Out"	Patricia Riggen	David Graziano & Julie Martin	January 26, 2023	2412	5.77
529	13	"Intersection"	Norberto Barba & Juan J. Campanella	David Graziano & Julie Martin	February 2, 2023	2413	5.34
530	14	"Dutch Tears"	Bethany Rooney	Monet Hurst-Mendoza & Kathy Dobie & Gabriel Vallejo	February 16, 2023	2414	5.13
531	15	"King of the Moon"	Mariska Hargitay	David Graziano & Julie Martin	February 23, 2023	2415	5.01
532	16	"The Presence of Absence"	Norberto Barba	Brianna Yellen & Brendan Feeney	March 23, 2023	2416	4.56
533	17	"Lime Chaser"	Juan J. Campanella	David Graziano & Julie Martin	March 30, 2023	2417	4.30
534	18	"Bubble Wrap"	Batán Silva	Teleplay by : Margaret Rose Lester & Nolan Dunbar; Story by : Denis Hamill	April 6, 2023	2418	4.57
535	19	"Bend the Law"	Martha Mitchell	Teleplay by : Brendan Feeney & Gabriel Vallejo; Story by : David Graziano & Julie Martin	April 27, 2023	2419	4.39
536	20	"Debatable"	Jean de Segonzac	Teleplay by : Brianna Yellen & Kelly Minster; Story by : Julie Martin & Kathy Dobie	May 4, 2023	2420	4.28
537	21	"Bad Things"	Juan J. Campanella	Teleplay by : Julie Martin & Nicholas Evangelista; Story by : David Graziano	May 11, 2023	2421	4.24
538	22	"All Pain Is One Malady"	Norberto Barba	David Graziano & Julie Martin	May 18, 2023	2422	4.37

=== Season 25 (2024) ===
- Kelli Giddish returns to reprise her role as Prof. Amanda Rollins in the season premiere ("Tunnel Blind") and in episode 11 ("Prima Nocta"). Her character was a regular on SVU from seasons 13–24.

Law & Order: Special Victims Unit season 25 episodes
No. overall	No. in season	Title	Directed by	Written by	Original release date	Prod. code	U.S. viewers (millions)
539	1	"Tunnel Blind"	Norberto Barba	David Graziano & Julie Martin	January 18, 2024	2501	5.66
540	2	"Truth Embargo"	Jean de Segonzac	Brendan Feeney & Nicholas Evangelista	January 25, 2024	2502	5.00
541	3	"The Punch List"	Norberto Barba	David Graziano & Gabriel Vallejo	February 1, 2024	2503	5.23
542	4	"Duty to Report"	Juan J. Campanella	Kathy Dobie & Candice Sanchez McFarlane	February 8, 2024	2504	4.82
543	5	"Zone Rouge"	Bethany Rooney	David Graziano & Julie Martin	February 22, 2024	2505	5.07
544	6	"Carousel"	Michael Smith	Brendan Feeney & Michael Carnes	February 29, 2024	2506	4.72
545	7	"Probability of Doom"	Martha Mitchell	David Graziano & Nicholas Evangelista	March 14, 2024	2507	4.70
546	8	"Third Man Syndrome"	Norberto Barba	Kathy Dobie & Candice Sanchez McFarlane	March 21, 2024	2508	4.10
547	9	"Children of Wolves"	Mariska Hargitay	David Graziano & Julie Martin	April 11, 2024	2509	4.07
548	10	"Combat Fatigue"	Michael Smith	David Graziano & Julie Martin	April 18, 2024	2510	4.78
549	11	"Prima Nocta"	Jean de Segonzac	David Graziano & Julie Martin	May 2, 2024	2511	4.32
550	12	"Marauder"	Juan J. Campanella	Teleplay by : Gabriel Vallejo & Greg Contaldi; Story by : Brendan Feeney	May 9, 2024	2512	4.12
551	13	"Duty to Hope"	Norberto Barba	David Graziano & Julie Martin	May 16, 2024	2513	4.14

=== Season 26 (2024–2025) ===
- Kevin Kane (Det. Terry Bruno) joins the main cast this season.
- Juliana Aidén Martinez (Det. Kate Silva) joins the cast, and then she leaves the show in the season finale, "Post-Rage".
- Kelli Giddish (Sgt. Amanda Rollins) had a continuous recurring arc starting with "Divide and Conquer" through "Shock Collar".
- David Graziano leaves the show as executive producer at the end of the season.

Law & Order: Special Victims Unit season 26 episodes
No. overall	No. in season	Title	Directed by	Written by	Original release date	Prod. code	U.S. viewers (millions)
552	1	"Fractured"	Norberto Barba	David Graziano & Julie Martin	October 3, 2024	2601	3.81
553	2	"Excavation"	Juan J. Campanella	Teleplay by : Kathy Dobie; Story by : David Graziano & Julie Martin	October 10, 2024	2602	3.77
554	3	"Divide and Conquer"	Martha Mitchell	David Graziano & Julie Martin	October 17, 2024	2604	3.19
555	4	"Constricted"	Michael Smith	Teleplay by : Candice Sanchez McFarlane; Story by : David Graziano & Julie Martin	October 24, 2024	2603	3.44
556	5	"Economics of Shame"	Jean de Segonzac	Teleplay by : Brendan Feeney; Story by : David Graziano & Julie Martin	October 31, 2024	2605	3.52
557	6	"Rorschach"	Oscar René Lozoya II	Teleplay by : Nicholas Evangelista; Story by : David Graziano & Julie Martin	November 7, 2024	2606	3.13
558	7	"Tenfold"	Jonathan Herron	Teleplay by : Gabriel Vallejo; Story by : David Graziano & Julie Martin	November 14, 2024	2607	3.32
559	8	"Cornered"	Juan J. Campanella	David Graziano & Julie Martin	November 21, 2024	2608	4.23
560	9	"First Light"	Norberto Barba	David Graziano & Julie Martin	January 16, 2025	2609	4.55
561	10	"Master Key"	Norberto Barba	Teleplay by : Nicholas Evangelista; Story by : David Graziano & Julie Martin	January 23, 2025	2610	4.76
562	11	"Deductible"	Oscar René Lozoya II	Kathy Dobie	January 30, 2025	2611	3.94
563	12	"Calculated"	Batán Silva	Teleplay by : Greg Contaldi; Story by : David Graziano & Julie Martin	February 13, 2025	2612	3.99
564	13	"Extinguished"	Heather Quick	Teleplay by : Gabriel Vallejo; Story by : David Graziano & Julie Martin	February 20, 2025	2613	3.84
565	14	"The Grid Plan"	Norberto Barba	David Graziano & Julie Martin	February 27, 2025	2614	3.81
566	15	"Undertow"	Martha Mitchell	Brendan Feeney	March 13, 2025	2615	3.50
567	16	"Let Me Bring Pardon"	Brenna Malloy	David Graziano & Julie Martin	March 20, 2025	2616	4.01
568	17	"Accomplice Liability"	Juan J. Campanella	David Graziano & Julie Martin	April 3, 2025	2617	3.36
569	18	"The Accuser"	Martha Mitchell	Andrea Ciannavei	April 10, 2025	2618	3.71
570	19	"Play with Fire Part 2"	Juan J. Campanella	David Graziano & Julie Martin	April 17, 2025	2619	4.23
571	20	"Shock Collar"	Norberto Barba	Teleplay by : Kathy Dobie & Candice Sanchez McFarlane; Story by : David Graziano & Julie Martin	May 1, 2025	2620	3.66
572	21	"Aperture"	Jean de Segonzac	Michael Carnes	May 8, 2025	2621	3.56
573	22	"Post-Rage"	Norberto Barba	Teleplay by : Kelly Minster & Ben Gaspin; Story by : David Graziano & Julie Martin	May 15, 2025	2622	3.99

=== Season 27 (2025–2026) ===
- Kelli Giddish (Sgt. Amanda Rollins) returns to the main cast this season.
- Aimé Donna Kelly (Captain Renee Curry) is promoted to series regular.
- Christopher Meloni (Elliot Stabler), BD Wong (Dr. George Huang), Dean Winters (Brian Cassidy) and Dann Florek (Donald Cragen) guest star during the season.
- Michele Fazekas assumes the role of showrunner.
- Octavio Pisano (Det. Joe Velasco) departs the cast after the third episode, "A Vicious Circle".
- Corey Cott (Det. Jake Griffin) is promoted to series regular starting with the ninth episode "Purity" also known as "Snowflakes (Part 2)".

Law & Order: Special Victims Unit season 27 episodes
No. overall	No. in season	Title	Directed by	Written by	Original release date	Prod. code	U.S. viewers (millions)
574	1	"In the Wind"	Brenna Malloy	Michele Fazekas	September 25, 2025	2701	3.83
575	2	"A Waiver of Consent"	Juan José Campanella	Kevin J. Hynes	October 2, 2025	2702	3.89
576	3	"A Vicious Circle"	Oscar René Lozoya II	Brant Englestein	October 9, 2025	2703	3.06
577	4	"Clickbait"	Norberto Barba	Kevin Deiboldt	October 16, 2025	2704	3.55
578	5	"Feed the Craving"	Brenna Malloy	Roxanne Paredes	October 23, 2025	2705	3.49
579	6	"Under the Influence"	Norberto Barba	Nicholas Evangelista	October 30, 2025	2706	3.71
580	7	"False Idols"	Steve Boyum	Justine Ferrara	November 13, 2025	2707	3.51
581	8	"Showdown"	Juan José Campanella	Kevin J. Hynes	November 20, 2025	2708	3.62
582	9	"Purity" "Snowflakes (Part 2)"	Jean de Segonzac	Kevin Deiboldt	January 8, 2026	2709	3.95
583	10	"Fidelis ad mortem"	Oscar René Lozoya II	Roxanne Paredes	January 15, 2026	2711	3.96
584	11	"Career Psychopath"	Michael Smith	Nicholas Evangelista	January 22, 2026	2712	4.04
585	12	"Hubris"	Juan José Campanella	Michele Fazekas	January 29, 2026	2713	4.01
586	13	"Corrosive"	Martha Mitchell	Brant Englestein	February 26, 2026	2710	3.74
587	14	"Frequency"	Brenna Malloy	Brant Englestein	March 5, 2026	2714	3.63
588	15	"Thirsty"	Michael Smith	Kevin J. Hynes	March 12, 2026	2715	3.57
589	16	"Vivid"	Norberto Barba	Roxanne Paredes	April 2, 2026	2716	3.15
590	17	"Deep Under"	Juan José Campanella	Nicholas Evangelista	April 9, 2026	2717	3.61
591	18	"Gimmick"	Norberto Barba	Kevin Deiboldt	April 23, 2026	2718	3.41
592	19	"Impropriety"	Jean de Segonzac	Ben Gaspin & Sarah Fiori	April 30, 2026	2719	3.58
593	20	"Old Friends"	Juan José Campanella	Justine Ferrara	May 7, 2026	2720	3.65
594	21	"Monster"	Brenna Malloy	Michele Fazekas	May 14, 2026	2721	4.11

=== Season 28 (2026) ===
Law & Order: Special Victims Unit season 28 episodes
No. overall	No. in season	Title	Directed by	Written by	Original release date	Prod. code
595	1	"Volition"	Brenna Malloy	Michele Fazekas	October 8, 2026	2801
596	2	"Midway"	Juan José Campanella	Kevin Deiboldt	October 15, 2026	2802
597	3	"Anonymity"	Norberto Barba	Nicholas P. Evangelista	October 22, 2026	2803
598	4	"Arcana"	Oscar Rene Lozoya II	Brant Englestein	October 29, 2026	2804
599	5	"Forsaken"	Steve Boyum	Justine Ferrara	November 5, 2026	2805
600	6	"Obedience"	TBA	Michele Fazekas	November 12, 2026	2806
601	7	TBA	TBA	Kevin J. Hynes	TBA	2807
602	8	TBA	TBA	Kevin Deiboldt	TBA	2808

== Home video releases ==
Season	Episodes	DVD release dates					
Season	Episodes	Region 1	Discs	Region 2	Discs	Region 4	Discs
1	22	October 21, 2003	6	February 28, 2005	6	January 19, 2005	6
2	21	September 27, 2005	3	November 21, 2005	6	March 8, 2006	6
3	23	January 30, 2007	5	July 23, 2007	6	August 1, 2007	6
4	25	December 4, 2007	5	September 10, 2007	6	November 21, 2007	6
5	25	September 14, 2004	4	June 16, 2008	6	July 2, 2008	6
6	23	April 1, 2008	5	September 22, 2008	6	December 3, 2008	5
7	22	July 29, 2008	5	February 16, 2009	5	March 4, 2009	5
8	22	February 17, 2009	5	April 13, 2009	5	June 3, 2009	5
9	19	May 26, 2009	5	August 31, 2009	5	September 30, 2009	5
10	22	September 22, 2009	5	December 28, 2009	5	February 4, 2010	5
11	24	September 21, 2010	5	January 16, 2017	6	December 1, 2010	5
12	24	September 27, 2011	5	January 16, 2017	6	December 7, 2011	5
13	23	September 25, 2012	5	February 27, 2017	6	November 28, 2012	6
14	24	September 24, 2013	5	February 27, 2017	6	November 7, 2013	6
15	24	September 23, 2014	5	March 27, 2017	6	December 4, 2014	6
16	23	August 11, 2015	5	March 27, 2017	6	December 11, 2015	6
17	23	September 13, 2016	5	November 28, 2016	5	October 12, 2016	6
18	21	February 13, 2018	4	TBA	TBA	December 6, 2017	4
19	24	September 4, 2018	4	TBA	TBA	September 26, 2018	4
20	24	September 10, 2019	4	TBA	TBA	September 18, 2019	6
21	20	July 7, 2020	4	TBA	TBA	September 23, 2020	5
22	16	July 20, 2021	4	TBA	TBA	September 22, 2021	4
23	22	July 12, 2022	4	TBA	TBA	October 12, 2022	4
24	22	October 3, 2023	5	TBA	TBA	October 11, 2023	6
25	13	September 10, 2024	3	TBA	TBA	November 13, 2024	3
26	22	September 23, 2025	5	TBA	TBA	November 5, 2025	6
27	21	September 29, 2026	5	TBA	TBA	TBA	TBA
