= List of Law & Order: Special Victims Unit episodes (seasons 1–19) =

Law & Order: Special Victims Unit is an American crime drama television series created by Dick Wolf's own production company, Wolf Entertainment for the National Broadcasting Company (NBC). The series focuses on the fictional lives of NYPD detectives, commanding officers and assistant district attorneys look into all types of child abuse as well as rapes, rape-homicides, and other sex crimes. The opening voice-over describes such atrocities as "especially heinous," and the show frequently focuses on the protagonists' struggles to deal with heinous crimes and living victims. It is primarily filmed in throughout all five of New York City's boroughs.

Throughout its run, Law & Order: Special Victims Unit has received critical acclaim and won numerous awards, including one NAACP, one ALMA Award, Primetime Emmy Awards and a Golden Globe Award for lead actress Mariska Hargitay. The series has also tackled important social issues and sparked public discourse on topics such as sexual assault, human trafficking and LGBTQ rights.

From the series debut on September 20, 1999, to May 23, 2018, Law & Order: Special Victims Unit had broadcast its first 434 episodes, to the end of the nineteenth season. The show holds several American television longevity records. It is the longest-running prime-time series in the United States. On November 18, 2003, Law & Order: Special Victims Unit reached its 100th episode in the fifth season, its 200th episode on April 29, 2008, in the ninth season, its 300th episode on October 24, 2012, in the fourteenth season and its 400th episode on February 15, 2017, in the eighteenth season.

In 2022, NBC signed a deal allowing Law & Order: Special Victims Unit episodes to be streamed on Peacock and Hulu. Most previous episodes can be watched for free on NBC.com and the NBC app.

== Series overview ==
Season	Episodes	Originally released		Rank	Rating
Season	Episodes	First released	Last released	Rank	Rating
1	22	September 20, 1999	May 19, 2000	30	8.8
2	21	October 20, 2000	May 11, 2001	25	9.6
3	23	September 28, 2001	May 17, 2002	12	10.4
4	25	September 27, 2002	May 16, 2003	14	10.1
5	25	September 23, 2003	May 18, 2004	18	8.7
6	23	September 21, 2004	May 24, 2005	16	9.2
7	22	September 20, 2005	May 16, 2006	18	9.2
8	22	September 19, 2006	May 22, 2007	24	7.9
9	19	September 25, 2007	May 13, 2008	22	7.6
10	22	September 23, 2008	June 2, 2009	26	6.7
11	24	September 23, 2009	May 19, 2010	—N/a	—N/a
12	24	September 22, 2010	May 18, 2011	—N/a	—N/a
13	23	September 21, 2011	May 23, 2012	—N/a	—N/a
14	24	September 26, 2012	May 22, 2013	—N/a	—N/a
15	24	September 25, 2013	May 21, 2014	—N/a	—N/a
16	23	September 24, 2014	May 20, 2015	—N/a	—N/a
17	23	September 23, 2015	May 25, 2016	—N/a	—N/a
18	21	September 21, 2016	May 24, 2017	—N/a	—N/a
19	24	September 27, 2017	May 23, 2018	30	5.6
20	24	September 27, 2018	May 16, 2019	—N/a	—N/a
21	20	September 26, 2019	April 23, 2020	—N/a	—N/a
22	16	November 12, 2020	June 3, 2021	36	5.9
23	22	September 23, 2021	May 19, 2022	40	6.3
24	22	September 22, 2022	May 18, 2023	TBA	TBA
25	13	January 18, 2024	May 16, 2024	TBA	TBA
26	22	October 3, 2024	May 15, 2025	47	8.7
27	21	September 25, 2025	May 14, 2026	39	8.7
28	TBA	October 8, 2026	TBA	TBA	TBA

== Episodes ==
=== Season 1 (1999–2000) ===
- Robert Palm leaves the show as executive producer.
- Michelle Hurd (Monique Jeffries) appears as a recurring character in episodes 1–13. She is then added to the main cast starting with the 14th episode.

Law & Order: Special Victims Unit season 1 episodes
No. overall	No. in season	Title	Directed by	Written by	Original release date	Prod. code	U.S. viewers (millions)
1	1	"Payback"	Jean de Segonzac	Dick Wolf	September 20, 1999	E0901	14.13
2	2	"A Single Life"	Lesli Linka Glatter	Miriam Kazdin	September 27, 1999	E0903	13.06
3	3	"...Or Just Look Like One"	Rick Rosenthal	Michael R. Perry	October 4, 1999	E0907	12.20
4	4	"Hysteria"	Richard Dobbs	Dawn DeNoon & Lisa Marie Petersen	October 11, 1999	E0908	13.72
5	5	"Wanderlust"	David Jones	Wendy West	October 18, 1999	E0905	14.30
6	6	"Sophomore Jinx"	Clark Johnson	John Chambers	October 25, 1999	E0904	12.48
7	7	"Uncivilized"	Michael Fields	Story by : Robert Palm; Teleplay by : Robert Palm & Wendy West	November 15, 1999	E0912	11.95
8	8	"Stalked"	Peter Medak	Roger Garrett	November 22, 1999	E0911	10.57
9	9	"Stocks & Bondage"	Constantine Makris	Michael R. Perry	November 29, 1999	E0914	10.90
10	10	"Closure: Part 1"	Stephen Wertimer	Wendy West	January 7, 2000	E0915	13.66
11	11	"Bad Blood"	Michael Fields	Dawn DeNoon & Lisa Marie Petersen	January 14, 2000	E0916	13.11
12	12	"Russian Love Poem"	Rick Rosenthal	Eva Nagorski	January 21, 2000	E0913	14.33
13	13	"Disrobed"	David Platt	Janet Tamaro	February 4, 2000	E0910	15.14
14	14	"Limitations"	Constantine Makris	Michael R. Perry	February 11, 2000	E0919	12.24
15	15	"Entitled"	Ed Sherin	Teleplay by : Robert Palm & Wendy West; Story by : Dick Wolf & René Balcer & Robert Palm	February 18, 2000	E0918	17.13
16	16	"The Third Guy"	Jud Taylor	Dawn DeNoon & Lisa Marie Petersen	February 25, 2000	E0920	13.68
17	17	"Misleader"	Richard Dobbs	Story by : Nick Harding & Nick Kendrick; Teleplay by : Nick Kendrick	March 31, 2000	E0902	12.45
18	18	"Chat Room"	Richard Dobbs	Roger Garrett	April 14, 2000	E0923	12.67
19	19	"Contact"	Michael Zinberg	Robert Palm & Wendy West	April 28, 2000	E0921	12.84
20	20	"Remorse"	Alexander Cassini	Michael R. Perry	May 5, 2000	E0924	11.94
21	21	"Nocturne"	Jean de Segonzac	Wendy West	May 12, 2000	E0922	13.70
22	22	"Slaves"	Ted Kotcheff	Lisa Marie Petersen & Dawn DeNoon	May 19, 2000	E0926	12.16

=== Season 2 (2000–2001) ===
- Stephanie March (Alexandra Cabot) and Ice-T (Fin Tutuola) join the cast.
- Michelle Hurd (Monique Jeffries) leaves the cast after the episode "Runaway".
- Neal Baer begins taking over as executive producer.

Law & Order: Special Victims Unit season 2 episodes
No. overall	No. in season	Title	Directed by	Written by	Original release date	Prod. code	U.S. viewers (millions)
23	1	"Wrong Is Right"	Ted Kotcheff	Jeff Eckerle & David J. Burke	October 20, 2000	E1403	13.39
24	2	"Honor"	Alan Metzger	Jonathan Greene & Robert F. Campbell	October 27, 2000	E1407	13.21
25	3	"Closure: Part 2"	Jean de Segonzac	Story by : Wendy West; Teleplay by : Wendy West, Judith McCreary, & David J. Burke	November 3, 2000	E1409	13.44
26	4	"Legacy"	Jud Taylor	Jeff Eckerle	November 10, 2000	E1401	13.37
27	5	"Baby Killer"	Juan J. Campanella	Lisa Marie Petersen & Dawn DeNoon	November 17, 2000	E1411	12.83
28	6	"Noncompliance"	Elodie Keene	Judith McCreary	November 24, 2000	E1417	15.32
29	7	"Asunder"	David Platt	Judith McCreary	December 1, 2000	E1404	15.43
30	8	"Taken"	Michael Fields	Dawn DeNoon & Lisa Marie Petersen	December 15, 2000	E1406	14.31
31	9	"Pixies"	Jean de Segonzac	Story by : Clifton Campbell, Jeff Eckerle, & Tracey Stern; Teleplay by : Tracey Stern	January 12, 2001	E1416	14.85
32	10	"Consent"	James Quinn	Jeff Eckerle	January 19, 2001	E1419	13.59
33	11	"Abuse"	Richard Dobbs	Story by : Gwendolyn M. Parker, Lisa Marie Petersen, & Dawn DeNoon; Teleplay by : Dawn DeNoon & Lisa Marie Petersen	January 26, 2001	E1415	15.23
34	12	"Secrets"	Arthur W. Forney	Story by : Wendy West, Robert F. Campbell, & Jonathan Greene; Teleplay by : Robert F. Campbell & Jonathan Greene	February 2, 2001	E1421	15.72
35	13	"Victims"	Constantine Makris	Nick Kendrick	February 9, 2001	E1420	14.91
36	14	"Paranoia"	Richard Dobbs	Jonathan Greene & Robert F. Campbell	February 16, 2001	E1426	14.11
37	15	"Countdown"	Steve Shill	Dawn DeNoon & Lisa Marie Petersen	February 23, 2001	E1412	15.59
38	16	"Runaway"	Richard Dobbs	Nick Kendrick & David J. Burke	March 2, 2001	E1405	14.57
39	17	"Folly"	Jud Taylor	Todd Robinson	March 23, 2001	E1428	14.30
40	18	"Manhunt"	Stephen Wertimer	Jeff Eckerle	April 20, 2001	E1431	12.67
41	19	"Parasites"	David Platt	Martin Weiss	April 27, 2001	E1427	13.41
42	20	"Pique"	Steve Shill	Judith McCreary	May 4, 2001	E1422	14.27
43	21	"Scourge"	Alex Zakrzewski	Story by : Neal Baer; Teleplay by : Robert F. Campbell & Jonathan Greene	May 11, 2001	E1432	15.06

=== Season 3 (2001–2002) ===
Law & Order: Special Victims Unit season 3 episodes
No. overall	No. in season	Title	Directed by	Written by	Original release date	Prod. code	U.S. viewers (millions)
44	1	"Repression"	Henry J. Bronchtein	Marilyn Osborn	September 28, 2001	E2310	15.79
45	2	"Wrath"	Jean de Segonzac	Judith McCreary	October 5, 2001	E2314	15.04
46	3	"Stolen"	James Quinn	Jonathan Greene & Robert F. Campbell	October 12, 2001	E2315	17.20
47	4	"Rooftop"	Steve Shill	Teleplay by : Robert F. Campbell & Jonathan Greene; Story by : Neal Baer and Robert F. Campbell & Jonathan Greene	October 19, 2001	E2318	15.44
48	5	"Tangled"	Jean de Segonzac	Lisa Marie Petersen & Dawn DeNoon	October 26, 2001	E2312	16.51
49	6	"Redemption"	Ted Kotcheff	Jeff Eckerle	November 2, 2001	E2319	14.58
50	7	"Sacrifice"	Lesli Linka Glatter	Story by : Javier Grillo-Marxuach; Teleplay by : Javier Grillo-Marxuach & Samantha Howard Corbin	November 9, 2001	E2309	16.20
51	8	"Inheritance"	Juan J. Campanella	Story by : Kathy Ebel; Teleplay by : Kathy Ebel and Michele Fazekas & Tara Butters	November 16, 2001	E2311	14.51
52	9	"Care"	Gloria Muzio	Dawn DeNoon & Lisa Marie Petersen	November 23, 2001	E2317	14.86
53	10	"Ridicule"	Constantine Makris	Judith McCreary	December 14, 2001	E2316	15.33
54	11	"Monogamy"	Constantine Makris	Michele Fazekas & Tara Butters	January 4, 2002	E2323	17.72
55	12	"Protection"	Alex Zakrzewski	Jonathan Greene & Robert F. Campbell	January 11, 2002	E2327	16.95
56	13	"Prodigy"	Steve Shill	Lisa Marie Petersen & Dawn DeNoon	January 18, 2002	E2326	16.03
57	14	"Counterfeit"	Arthur W. Forney	Amanda Green	January 25, 2002	E2313	16.76
58	15	"Execution"	Alex Zakrzewski	Judith McCreary	February 1, 2002	E2325	17.05
59	16	"Popular"	Jean de Segonzac	Story by : Kathy Ebel & Stephen Belber; Teleplay by : Stephen Belber	March 1, 2002	E2329	15.80
60	17	"Surveillance"	Steve Shill	Jeff Eckerle	March 8, 2002	E2328	16.39
61	18	"Guilt"	David Platt	Michele Fazekas & Tara Butters	March 29, 2002	E2332	14.41
62	19	"Justice"	Juan J. Campanella	Dawn DeNoon & Lisa Marie Petersen	April 5, 2002	E2331	16.60
63	20	"Greed"	Constantine Makris	Robert F. Campbell & Jonathan Greene	April 26, 2002	E2330	14.22
64	21	"Denial"	Steve Shill	Judith McCreary	May 3, 2002	E2334	16.72
65	22	"Competence"	Jud Taylor	Teleplay by : Jonathan Greene & Robert F. Campbell; Story by : Jeff Eckerle and Jonathan Greene & Robert F. Campbell	May 10, 2002	E2335	17.29
66	23	"Silence"	Steve Shill	Patrick Harbinson	May 17, 2002	E3103	14.27

=== Season 4 (2002–2003) ===
- BD Wong (George Huang) officially joins the cast.

Law & Order: Special Victims Unit season 4 episodes
No. overall	No. in season	Title	Directed by	Written by	Original release date	Prod. code	U.S. viewers (millions)
67	1	"Chameleon"	Jean de Segonzac	Michele Fazekas & Tara Butters	September 27, 2002	E3151	14.88
68	2	"Deception"	Constantine Makris	Michele Fazekas & Tara Butters	October 4, 2002	E3105	15.21
69	3	"Vulnerable"	Juan J. Campanella	Lisa Marie Petersen & Dawn DeNoon	October 11, 2002	E3104	15.91
70	4	"Lust"	Michael Fields	Amanda Green	October 18, 2002	E3102	15.11
71	5	"Disappearing Acts"	Alex Zakrzewski	Judith McCreary	October 25, 2002	E3101	16.54
72	6	"Angels"	Arthur W. Forney	Jonathan Greene & Robert F. Campbell	November 1, 2002	E3106	15.34
73	7	"Dolls"	Darnell Martin	Amanda Green	November 8, 2002	E3114	16.83
74	8	"Waste"	Donna Deitch	Dawn DeNoon & Lisa Marie Petersen	November 15, 2002	E3111	16.12
75	9	"Juvenile"	Constantine Makris	Michele Fazekas & Tara Butters	November 22, 2002	E3112	14.46
76	10	"Resilience"	Joyce Chopra	Patrick Harbinson	December 6, 2002	E3113	16.22
77	11	"Damaged"	Juan J. Campanella	Barbie Kligman	January 10, 2003	E3109	16.60
78	12	"Risk"	Juan J. Campanella	Robert F. Campbell & Jonathan Greene	January 17, 2003	E3115	16.26
79	13	"Rotten"	Constantine Makris	Judith McCreary	January 24, 2003	E3119	16.08
80	14	"Mercy"	David Platt	Christos N. Gage & Ruth C. Fletcher	January 31, 2003	E3118	15.50
81	15	"Pandora"	Alex Zakrzewski	Michele Fazekas & Tara Butters	February 7, 2003	E3120	15.46
82	16	"Tortured"	Steve Shill	Lisa Marie Petersen & Dawn DeNoon	February 14, 2003	E3121	14.52
83	17	"Privilege"	Jean de Segonzac	Patrick Harbinson	February 21, 2003	E3122	14.98
84	18	"Desperate"	David Platt	Amanda Green	March 14, 2003	E3124	16.48
85	19	"Appearances"	Alex Zakrzewski	Story by : Liz Friedman, Vanessa Place, & Stephen Belber; Teleplay by : Stephen Belber	March 28, 2003	E3110	15.31
86	20	"Dominance"	Steve Shill	Robert F. Campbell & Jonathan Greene	April 4, 2003	E3123	15.85
87	21	"Fallacy"	Juan J. Campanella	Story by : Josh Kotcheff & Barbie Kligman; Teleplay by : Barbie Kligman	April 18, 2003	E3117	14.84
88	22	"Futility"	Alex Zakrzewski	Michele Fazekas & Tara Butters	April 25, 2003	E3125	13.49
89	23	"Grief"	Constantine Makris	Adisa Iwa	May 2, 2003	E3116	13.97
90	24	"Perfect"	Rick Wallace	Jonathan Greene & Robert F. Campbell	May 9, 2003	E3126	13.28
91	25	"Soulless"	Chad Lowe	Dawn DeNoon & Lisa Marie Petersen	May 16, 2003	E3127	13.72

=== Season 5 (2003–2004) ===
- Stephanie March (ADA Alexandra Cabot) leaves the cast after the episode "Loss". Her character is "killed off" and put into the Witness Protection Program. March (Cabot) is replaced by Diane Neal as ADA Casey Novak in the episode "Serendipity".

Law & Order: Special Victims Unit season 5 episodes
No. overall	No. in season	Title	Directed by	Written by	Original release date	Prod. code	U.S. viewers (millions)
92	1	"Tragedy"	David Platt	Amanda Green	September 23, 2003	E4403	13.23
93	2	"Manic"	Guy Norman Bee	Patrick Harbinson	September 30, 2003	E4401	11.48
94	3	"Mother"	Ted Kotcheff	Lisa Marie Petersen & Dawn DeNoon	October 7, 2003	E4404	9.94
95	4	"Loss"	Constantine Makris	Michele Fazekas & Tara Butters	October 14, 2003	E4402	12.65
96	5	"Serendipity"	Constantine Makris	Dawn DeNoon & Lisa Marie Petersen	October 21, 2003	E4408	11.87
97	6	"Coerced"	Jean de Segonzac	Jonathan Greene	October 28, 2003	E4409	12.18
98	7	"Choice"	David Platt	Patrick Harbinson	November 4, 2003	E4411	13.08
99	8	"Abomination"	Alex Zakrzewski	Michele Fazekas & Tara Butters	November 11, 2003	E4410	12.99
100	9	"Control"	Ted Kotcheff	Story by : Dick Wolf; Teleplay by : Neal Baer	November 18, 2003	E4413	13.94
101	10	"Shaken"	Constantine Makris	Amanda Green	November 25, 2003	E4414	13.14
102	11	"Escape"	Jean de Segonzac	Barbie Kligman	December 2, 2003	E4415	13.65
103	12	"Brotherhood"	Jean de Segonzac	José Molina	January 6, 2004	E4412	15.36
104	13	"Hate"	David Platt	Robert Nathan	January 13, 2004	E4416	14.09
105	14	"Ritual"	Ed Bianchi	Ruth Fletcher Gage & Christos N. Gage	February 3, 2004	E4406	13.81
106	15	"Families"	Constantine Makris	Jonathan Greene	February 10, 2004	E4419	12.89
107	16	"Home"	Rick Wallace	Amanda Green	February 17, 2004	E4420	14.37
108	17	"Mean"	Constantine Makris	Michele Fazekas & Tara Butters	February 24, 2004	E4421	14.42
109	18	"Careless"	Steve Shill	Patrick Harbinson	March 2, 2004	E4422	12.45
110	19	"Sick"	David Platt	Dawn DeNoon	March 30, 2004	E4423	15.55
111	20	"Lowdown"	Jud Taylor	Robert Nathan	April 6, 2004	E4424	12.49
112	21	"Criminal"	Alex Zakrzewski	José Molina	April 20, 2004	E4425	12.83
113	22	"Painless"	Juan J. Campanella	Jonathan Greene	April 27, 2004	E4426	12.78
114	23	"Bound"	Constantine Makris	Barbie Kligman	May 4, 2004	E4427	13.04
115	24	"Poison"	David Platt	Michele Fazekas & Tara Butters	May 11, 2004	E4428	12.28
116	25	"Head"	Juan J. Campanella	Lisa Marie Petersen & Dawn DeNoon	May 18, 2004	E4418	18.36

=== Season 6 (2004–2005) ===
- Stephanie March returns to reprise her role as ADA Alexandra Cabot for one episode ("Ghost"). Her character was a regular on SVU for seasons 2–5.

Law & Order: Special Victims Unit season 6 episodes
No. overall	No. in season	Title	Directed by	Written by	Original release date	Prod. code	U.S. viewers (millions)
117	1	"Birthright"	Arthur W. Forney	Jonathan Greene	September 21, 2004	E5201	14.20
118	2	"Debt"	David Platt	Amanda Green	September 28, 2004	E5203	13.00
119	3	"Obscene"	Constantine Makris	José Molina	October 12, 2004	E5205	12.35
120	4	"Scavenger"	Daniel Sackheim	Dawn DeNoon & Lisa Marie Petersen	October 19, 2004	E5207	12.62
121	5	"Outcry"	Constantine Makris	Patrick Harbinson	October 26, 2004	E5202	13.01
122	6	"Conscience"	David Platt	Roger Wolfson & Robert Nathan	November 9, 2004	E5208	14.30
123	7	"Charisma"	Arthur W. Forney	Michele Fazekas & Tara Butters	November 16, 2004	E5206	16.38
124	8	"Doubt"	Ted Kotcheff	Marjorie David	November 23, 2004	E5209	15.21
125	9	"Weak"	David Platt	Michele Fazekas & Tara Butters	November 30, 2004	E5213	15.30
126	10	"Haunted"	Juan J. Campanella	Amanda Green	December 7, 2004	E5212	13.50
127	11	"Contagious"	Aaron Lipstadt	Jonathan Greene	January 11, 2005	E5214	15.95
128	12	"Identity"	Rick Wallace	Lisa Marie Petersen & Dawn DeNoon	January 18, 2005	E5215	15.34
129	13	"Quarry"	Constantine Makris	José Molina	January 25, 2005	E5217	14.19
130	14	"Game"	David Platt	Patrick Harbinson	February 8, 2005	E5216	14.18
131	15	"Hooked"	Jean de Segonzac	Joshua Kotcheff	February 15, 2005	E5211	13.76
132	16	"Ghost"	David Platt	Amanda Green	February 22, 2005	E5218	14.03
133	17	"Rage"	Juan J. Campanella	Michele Fazekas & Tara Butters	March 1, 2005	E5219	12.29
134	18	"Pure"	Aaron Lipstadt	Dawn DeNoon	March 8, 2005	E5220	14.73
135	19	"Intoxicated"	Marita Grabiak	Jonathan Greene	March 29, 2005	E5221	14.56
136	20	"Night"	Arthur W. Forney & Juan J. Campanella	Story by : Amanda Green & Chris Levinson; Teleplay by : Amanda Green	May 3, 2005	E5224	16.54
137	21	"Blood"	Félix Alcalá	Patrick Harbinson	May 10, 2005	E5223	14.50
138	22	"Parts"	Matt Earl Beesley	David Foster	May 17, 2005	E5204	16.21
139	23	"Goliath"	Peter Leto	Michele Fazekas & Tara Butters	May 24, 2005	E5225	16.38

=== Season 7 (2005–2006) ===
- Tamara Tunie (M.E. Melinda Warner) officially joins the cast.

Law & Order: Special Victims Unit season 7 episodes
No. overall	No. in season	Title	Directed by	Written by	Original release date	Prod. code	U.S. viewers (millions)
140	1	"Demons"	David Platt	Amanda Green	September 20, 2005	0704	16.82
141	2	"Design"	David Platt	Lisa Marie Petersen	September 27, 2005	0701	15.32
142	3	"911"	Ted Kotcheff	Patrick Harbinson	October 4, 2005	0707	16.24
143	4	"Ripped"	Rick Wallace	Jonathan Greene	October 11, 2005	0703	14.88
144	5	"Strain"	Constantine Makris	Robert Nathan	October 18, 2005	0705	14.36
145	6	"Raw"	Jonathan Kaplan	Dawn DeNoon	November 1, 2005	0708	15.20
146	7	"Name"	David Platt	Michele Fazekas	November 8, 2005	0706	15.76
147	8	"Starved"	David Platt	Lisa Marie Petersen	November 15, 2005	0709	15.73
148	9	"Rockabye"	Peter Leto	Patrick Harbinson	November 22, 2005	0710	17.08
149	10	"Storm"	David Platt	Neal Baer & Amanda Green	November 29, 2005	0711	17.54
150	11	"Alien"	Constantine Makris	José Molina	December 6, 2005	0702	16.30
151	12	"Infected"	Michelle MacLaren	Michele Fazekas & Tara Butters	January 3, 2006	0712	15.22
152	13	"Blast"	Peter Leto	Amanda Green	January 10, 2006	0713	14.72
153	14	"Taboo"	Arthur W. Forney	Dawn DeNoon	January 17, 2006	0714	16.10
154	15	"Manipulated"	Matt Earl Beesley	José Molina	February 7, 2006	0715	15.24
155	16	"Gone"	George Pattison	Jonathan Greene	February 28, 2006	0716	13.83
156	17	"Class"	Aaron Lipstadt	Paul Grellong	March 21, 2006	0717	13.48
157	18	"Venom"	Peter Leto	Judith McCreary	March 28, 2006	0719	14.24
158	19	"Fault"	Paul McCrane	Michele Fazekas & Tara Butters	April 4, 2006	0718	15.36
159	20	"Fat"	Juan J. Campanella	Patrick Harbinson	May 2, 2006	0721	15.27
160	21	"Web"	Peter Leto	Paul Grellong	May 9, 2006	0722	12.88
161	22	"Influence"	Norberto Barba	Ian Biederman	May 16, 2006	0720	12.97

=== Season 8 (2006–2007) ===
- Connie Nielsen had a six episode arc as Det. Dani Beck from the episode "Clock" to the episode "Cage", not appearing in "Infiltrated".

Law & Order: Special Victims Unit season 8 episodes
No. overall	No. in season	Title	Directed by	Written by	Original release date	Prod. code	U.S. viewers (millions)
162	1	"Informed"	Peter Leto	Dawn DeNoon	September 19, 2006	0801	14.55
163	2	"Clock"	Jim Hayman	Allison Intrieri	September 26, 2006	0803	14.41
164	3	"Recall"	Juan J. Campanella	Jonathan Greene	October 3, 2006	0805	14.30
165	4	"Uncle"	David Platt	Dawn DeNoon	October 10, 2006	0804	13.89
166	5	"Confrontation"	David Platt	Judith McCreary	October 17, 2006	0806	12.98
167	6	"Infiltrated"	David Platt	Dawn DeNoon	October 31, 2006	0809	13.36
168	7	"Underbelly"	Jonathan Kaplan	Amanda Green	November 14, 2006	0807	14.76
169	8	"Cage"	David Platt	Patrick Harbinson	November 21, 2006	0808	14.20
170	9	"Choreographed"	Peter Leto	Paul Grellong	November 28, 2006	0810	14.64
171	10	"Scheherazade"	David Platt	Amanda Green	January 2, 2007	0802	15.17
172	11	"Burned"	Eriq La Salle	Judith McCreary	January 9, 2007	0811	14.41
173	12	"Outsider"	Arthur W. Forney	Paul Grellong	January 16, 2007	0816	14.17
174	13	"Loophole"	David Platt	Jonathan Greene	February 6, 2007	0812	13.45
175	14	"Dependent"	Peter Leto	Ken Storer	February 13, 2007	0815	12.94
176	15	"Haystack"	Peter Leto	Amanda Green	February 20, 2007	0813	11.94
177	16	"Philadelphia"	Peter Leto	Patrick Harbinson	February 27, 2007	0817	11.73
178	17	"Sin"	George Pattison	Patrick Harbinson	March 27, 2007	0821	12.86
179	18	"Responsible"	Yelena Lanskaya & David Platt	Allison Intrieri	April 3, 2007	0814	11.16
180	19	"Florida"	David Platt	Jonathan Greene	May 1, 2007	0818	11.41
181	20	"Annihilated"	Peter Leto	Amanda Green	May 8, 2007	0819	10.94
182	21	"Pretend"	David Platt	Dawn DeNoon	May 15, 2007	0820	12.75
183	22	"Screwed"	Arthur W. Forney	Judith McCreary	May 22, 2007	0822	10.28

=== Season 9 (2007–2008) ===
- Adam Beach (Det. Chester Lake) joins the cast, then leaves with Diane Neal (ADA Casey Novak) at the end.

Law & Order: Special Victims Unit season 9 episodes
No. overall	No. in season	Title	Directed by	Written by	Original release date	Prod. code	U.S. viewers (millions)
184	1	"Alternate"	David Platt	Neal Baer & Dawn DeNoon	September 25, 2007	0903	12.12
185	2	"Avatar"	Peter Leto	Paul Grellong	October 2, 2007	0904	11.62
186	3	"Impulsive"	David Platt	Jonathan Greene	October 9, 2007	0901	12.30
187	4	"Savant"	Kate Woods	Judith McCreary	October 16, 2007	0905	12.51
188	5	"Harm"	Peter Leto	Josh Singer	October 23, 2007	0902	12.31
189	6	"Svengali"	David Platt	Kam Miller	November 6, 2007	0906	11.70
190	7	"Blinded"	David Platt	Jonathan Greene	November 13, 2007	0909	12.48
191	8	"Fight"	Juan J. Campanella	Mick Betancourt	November 20, 2007	0907	11.69
192	9	"Paternity"	Kate Woods	Amanda Green	November 27, 2007	0910	12.29
193	10	"Snitch"	Jonathan Kaplan	Mark Goffman	December 4, 2007	0908	11.73
194	11	"Streetwise"	Helen Shaver	Paul Grellong	January 1, 2008	0913	12.35
195	12	"Signature"	Arthur W. Forney	Judith McCreary	January 8, 2008	0911	15.15
196	13	"Unorthodox"	David Platt	Josh Singer	January 15, 2008	0912	12.21
197	14	"Inconceivable"	Chris Zalla	Dawn DeNoon	January 22, 2008	0914	12.98
198	15	"Undercover"	David Platt	Mark Goffman	April 15, 2008	0915	13.27
199	16	"Closet"	Peter Leto	Ken Storer	April 22, 2008	0916	11.64
200	17	"Authority"	David Platt	Neal Baer & Amanda Green	April 29, 2008	0917	12.31
201	18	"Trade"	Peter Leto	Jonathan Greene	May 6, 2008	0918	10.53
202	19	"Cold"	David Platt	Judith McCreary	May 13, 2008	0919	11.50

=== Season 10 (2008–2009) ===
- Michaela McManus (ADA Kim Greylek) joins the cast after replacing Diane Neal (ADA Casey Novak) through the fifteenth episode, "Lead", where she is replaced by Stephanie March (ADA Alexandra Cabot) in a recurring capacity.

Law & Order: Special Victims Unit season 10 episodes
No. overall	No. in season	Title	Directed by	Written by	Original release date	Prod. code	U.S. viewers (millions)
203	1	"Trials"	David Platt	Dawn DeNoon	September 23, 2008	1002	9.68
204	2	"Confession"	Arthur W. Forney	Judith McCreary	September 30, 2008	1003	10.39
205	3	"Swing"	David Platt	Amanda Green	October 14, 2008	1004	9.51
206	4	"Lunacy"	Peter Leto	Daniel Truly	October 21, 2008	1001	9.50
207	5	"Retro"	Peter Leto	Story by : Joshua Kotcheff & Jonathan Greene; Teleplay by : Jonathan Greene	October 28, 2008	1005	9.33
208	6	"Babes"	David Platt	Daniel Truly	November 11, 2008	1006	9.42
209	7	"Wildlife"	Peter Leto	Mick Betancourt	November 18, 2008	1008	10.11
210	8	"Persona"	Helen Shaver	Amanda Green	November 25, 2008	1009	8.59
211	9	"PTSD"	Eriq La Salle	Judith McCreary	December 2, 2008	1007	10.33
212	10	"Smut"	Chris Eyre	Kam Miller	December 9, 2008	1010	11.02
213	11	"Stranger"	David Platt	Dawn DeNoon	January 6, 2009	1011	10.82
214	12	"Hothouse"	Peter Leto	Charley Davis	January 13, 2009	1012	9.77
215	13	"Snatched"	David Platt	Mick Betancourt	February 3, 2009	1013	10.34
216	14	"Transitions"	Peter Leto	Ken Storer	February 17, 2009	1014	9.48
217	15	"Lead"	David Platt	Jonathan Greene	March 10, 2009	1015	11.07
218	16	"Ballerina"	Peter Leto	Daniel Truly	March 17, 2009	1016	10.74
219	17	"Hell"	David Platt	Amanda Green	March 31, 2009	1017	9.37
220	18	"Baggage"	Chris Zalla	Judith McCreary	April 7, 2009	1018	9.26
221	19	"Selfish"	David Platt	Mick Betancourt	April 28, 2009	1019	10.55
222	20	"Crush"	Peter Leto	Jonathan Greene	May 5, 2009	1020	9.82
223	21	"Liberties"	Juan J. Campanella	Dawn DeNoon	May 19, 2009	1021	6.73
224	22	"Zebras"	Peter Leto	Amanda Green & Daniel Truly	June 2, 2009	1022	11.56

=== Season 11 (2009–2010) ===
- Christine Lahti had a four-episode arc as Executive ADA Sonya Paxton; from the season premiere episode "Unstable" to "Hammered". She also returns in the eighth episode, "Turmoil".
- Stephanie March rejoined the cast as ADA Alexandra Cabot starting with the episode "Hardwired" to the episode "Witness".
- Sharon Stone had a four-episode arc as ADA Jo Marlowe from the episode "Torch" to the season finale episode "Shattered".

Law & Order: Special Victims Unit season 11 episodes
No. overall	No. in season	Title	Directed by	Written by	Original release date	Prod. code	U.S. viewers (millions)
225	1	"Unstable"	Arthur W. Forney	Judith McCreary	September 23, 2009	1101	8.36
226	2	"Sugar"	Peter Leto	Daniel Truly	September 30, 2009	1102	8.09
227	3	"Solitary"	Helen Shaver	Amanda Green	October 7, 2009	1103	8.29
228	4	"Hammered"	Peter Leto	Dawn DeNoon	October 14, 2009	1104	8.77
229	5	"Hardwired"	David Platt	Mick Betancourt	October 21, 2009	1105	9.15
230	6	"Spooked"	Peter Leto	Jonathan Greene	October 28, 2009	1106	8.24
231	7	"Users"	David Platt	Michael Angeli	November 4, 2009	1108	7.95
232	8	"Turmoil"	Peter Leto	Judith McCreary	November 11, 2009	1109	8.77
233	9	"Perverted"	David Platt	Dawn DeNoon	November 18, 2009	1110	8.44
234	10	"Anchor"	Jonathan Kaplan	Amanda Green & Daniel Truly	December 9, 2009	1107	7.92
235	11	"Quickie"	David Platt	Ken Storer	January 6, 2010	1111	11.59
236	12	"Shadow"	Amy Redford	Amanda Green	January 13, 2010	1112	7.65
237	13	"P.C."	Juan J. Campanella	Daniel Truly	March 3, 2010	1115	8.14
238	14	"Savior"	Peter Leto	Mick Betancourt	March 3, 2010	1114	8.14
239	15	"Confidential"	Peter Leto	Jonathan Greene	March 10, 2010	1113	8.53
240	16	"Witness"	David Platt	Dawn DeNoon & Christine M. Torres	March 17, 2010	1116	9.65
241	17	"Disabled"	Paul Black	Judith McCreary	March 24, 2010	1117	10.58
242	18	"Bedtime"	Helen Shaver	Story by : Charley Davis; Teleplay by : Neal Baer & Daniel Truly	March 31, 2010	1118	10.08
243	19	"Conned"	David Platt	Ken Storer	April 7, 2010	1119	8.36
244	20	"Beef"	Peter Leto	Lisa Loomer	April 21, 2010	1120	8.75
245	21	"Torch"	Peter Leto	Mick Betancourt & Amanda Green	April 28, 2010	1121	9.49
246	22	"Ace"	David Platt	Jonathan Greene	May 5, 2010	1122	8.43
247	23	"Wannabe"	David Platt	Dawn DeNoon	May 12, 2010	1123	8.57
248	24	"Shattered"	Peter Leto	Amanda Green & Daniel Truly	May 19, 2010	1124	8.79

=== Season 12 (2010–2011) ===
- Melissa Sagemiller has a continuous episode arc as ADA Gillian Hardwicke starting with the episode "Branded" to the episode "Bombshell".
- Diane Neal returns to reprise her role as ADA Casey Novak for one episode ("Reparations"). Her character was a regular on SVU from seasons 5–9.
- Neal Baer leaves the show as executive producer at the end of the season.
- Christopher Meloni (Det. Elliot Stabler), BD Wong (George Huang), and Tamara Tunie (Melinda Warner) leave the cast after the season finale ("Smoked").

Law & Order: Special Victims Unit season 12 episodes
No. overall	No. in season	Title	Directed by	Written by	Original release date	Prod. code	U.S. viewers (millions)
249	1	"Locum"	Arthur W. Forney	Dawn DeNoon	September 22, 2010	1201	10.08
250	2	"Bullseye"	Peter Leto	Daniel Truly	September 22, 2010	1202	10.08
251	3	"Behave"	Helen Shaver	Jonathan Greene	September 29, 2010	1203	9.48
252	4	"Merchandise"	Peter Leto	Judith McCreary	October 6, 2010	1204	8.69
253	5	"Wet"	Jonathan Kaplan	Speed Weed	October 13, 2010	1205	8.13
254	6	"Branded"	Peter Leto	Chris Brancato	October 20, 2010	1206	8.74
255	7	"Trophy"	Donna Deitch	Ken Storer	November 3, 2010	1207	8.13
256	8	"Penetration"	Peter Leto	Christine M. Torres & Dawn DeNoon	November 10, 2010	1208	7.18
257	9	"Gray"	Helen Shaver	George Huang	November 17, 2010	1209	7.65
258	10	"Rescue"	Peter Leto & Constantine Makris	Daniel Truly	December 1, 2010	1210	9.22
259	11	"Pop"	Norberto Barba	Jonathan Greene	January 5, 2011	1212	10.60
260	12	"Possessed"	Constantine Makris	Brian Fagan	January 5, 2011	1213	10.60
261	13	"Mask"	Donna Deitch	Speed Weed	January 12, 2011	1215	8.39
262	14	"Dirty"	Helen Shaver	Judith McCreary	January 19, 2011	1211	6.97
263	15	"Flight"	Alex Chapple	Dawn DeNoon & Christine M. Torres	February 2, 2011	1216	8.81
264	16	"Spectacle"	Peter Leto	Chris Brancato	February 9, 2011	1214	7.89
265	17	"Pursuit"	Jonathan Kaplan	Judith McCreary	February 16, 2011	1217	7.31
266	18	"Bully"	Helen Shaver	Ken Storer	February 23, 2011	1218	8.02
267	19	"Bombshell"	Patrick Creadon	Daniel Truly	March 23, 2011	1219	8.84
268	20	"Totem"	Jonathan Kaplan	Jonathan Greene	March 30, 2011	1220	8.54
269	21	"Reparations"	Constantine Makris	Christine M. Torres	April 6, 2011	1221	8.29
270	22	"Bang"	Peter Leto	Speed Weed	May 4, 2011	1222	8.53
271	23	"Delinquent"	Holly Dale	Dawn DeNoon	May 11, 2011	1223	8.10
272	24	"Smoked"	Helen Shaver	Jonathan Greene & Daniel Truly	May 18, 2011	1224	8.98

=== Season 13 (2011–2012) ===
- The first season not to feature longtime cast member Christopher Meloni, who left the series after 12 seasons in the twelfth season finale.
- Warren Leight begins taking over as executive producer.
- Danny Pino (Det. Nick Amaro) and Kelli Giddish (Det. Amanda Rollins) join the cast.
- Stephanie March (ADA Alexandra Cabot) and Diane Neal (ADA Casey Novak) both return as recurring characters.
- Tamara Tunie (M.E. Melinda Warner) is moved from the main cast to a recurring role.
- BD Wong (Dr. George Huang) reprises his role in "Father Dearest" following his departure from the cast in July 2011.

Law & Order: Special Victims Unit season 13 episodes
No. overall	No. in season	Title	Directed by	Written by	Original release date	Prod. code	U.S. viewers (millions)
273	1	"Scorched Earth"	Michael Slovis	David Matthews	September 21, 2011	1301	7.63
274	2	"Personal Fouls"	Jim McKay	Bryan Goluboff	September 28, 2011	1302	7.24
275	3	"Blood Brothers"	Tom DiCillo	Warren Leight & Julie Martin	October 5, 2011	1303	7.98
276	4	"Double Strands"	Fred Berner	John P. Roche	October 12, 2011	1304	7.34
277	5	"Missing Pieces"	Peter Leto	Julie Martin & Warren Leight	October 19, 2011	1305	7.66
278	6	"True Believers"	Courtney Hunt	Robin Veith	November 2, 2011	1306	7.10
279	7	"Russian Brides"	Alex Chapple	Bryan Goluboff	November 9, 2011	1307	6.70
280	8	"Educated Guess"	Arthur W. Forney	Judith McCreary	November 16, 2011	1308	7.33
281	9	"Lost Traveler"	Jean de Segonzac	Julie Martin & David Matthews	November 30, 2011	1309	9.90
282	10	"Spiraling Down"	Alex Chapple	John P. Roche & Warren Leight	December 7, 2011	1310	7.03
283	11	"Theatre Tricks"	Constantine Makris	Story by : Marygrace O'Shea, Julie Martin, & Warren Leight; Teleplay by : Marygrace O'Shea	January 11, 2012	1311	8.40
284	12	"Official Story"	Michael Smith	Peter Blauner	January 18, 2012	1312	6.42
285	13	"Father's Shadow"	Jean de Segonzac	Warren Leight & Julie Martin	February 8, 2012	1313	6.55
286	14	"Home Invasions"	Jim McKay	Bryan Goluboff	February 15, 2012	1314	5.90
287	15	"Hunting Ground"	Jonathan Kaplan	Story by : John P. Roche & Warren Leight; Teleplay by : David Matthews & John P. Roche	February 22, 2012	1315	5.99
288	16	"Child's Welfare"	Holly Dale	Story by : Warren Leight; Teleplay by : Peter Blauner & Julie Martin	February 29, 2012	1316	5.42
289	17	"Justice Denied"	Michael Slovis	Story by : Stuart Feldman & Warren Leight; Teleplay by : Stuart Feldman	April 11, 2012	1318	5.57
290	18	"Valentine's Day"	Peter Leto	Julie Martin & Warren Leight	April 18, 2012	1317	5.95
291	19	"Street Revenge"	Arthur W. Forney	Story by : Julie Martin & David Matthews; Teleplay by : David Matthews	April 25, 2012	1320	6.56
292	20	"Father Dearest"	Rosemary Rodriguez	Story by : John P. Roche & Warren Leight; Teleplay by : John P. Roche	May 2, 2012	1321	6.62
293	21	"Learning Curve"	Jonathan Herron	Story by : Warren Leight & Julie Martin; Teleplay by : Robin Veith	May 9, 2012	1319	5.90
294	22	"Strange Beauty"	Alex Chapple	Peter Blauner & Robin Veith	May 16, 2012	1322	5.56
295	23	"Rhodium Nights"	Norberto Barba	Warren Leight & Julie Martin	May 23, 2012	1323	7.16

=== Season 14 (2012–2013) ===
- Raúl Esparza has a continuous arc as ADA Rafael Barba starting with the third episode.

Law & Order: Special Victims Unit season 14 episodes
No. overall	No. in season	Title	Directed by	Written by	Original release date	Prod. code	U.S. viewers (millions)
296	1	"Lost Reputation"	Michael Slovis	Warren Leight & Julie Martin	September 26, 2012	1401	7.19
297	2	"Above Suspicion"	Michael Slovis	Julie Martin & Warren Leight	September 26, 2012	1402	7.19
298	3	"Twenty-Five Acts"	Jean de Segonzac	Story by : Warren Leight & Julie Martin; Teleplay by : John P. Roche	October 10, 2012	1403	6.24
299	4	"Acceptable Loss"	Alex Chapple	Ed Zuckerman	October 17, 2012	1404	6.25
300	5	"Manhattan Vigil"	Jean de Segonzac	Peter Blauner	October 24, 2012	1405	6.77
301	6	"Friending Emily"	Jim McKay	Kevin Fox	October 31, 2012	1406	6.05
302	7	"Vanity's Bonfire"	Michael Slovis	Story by : Gwendolyn Parker & Warren Leight; Teleplay by : Gwendolyn Parker	November 14, 2012	1407	5.78
303	8	"Lessons Learned"	Alex Chapple	Story by : Julie Martin & Ed Zuckerman; Teleplay by : Ed Zuckerman & John P. Roche	November 21, 2012	1408	5.20
304	9	"Dreams Deferred"	Michael Smith	Julie Martin & Warren Leight	December 5, 2012	1409	6.16
305	10	"Presumed Guilty"	Courtney Hunt	Kevin Fox	January 2, 2013	1410	7.73
306	11	"Beautiful Frame"	Jean de Segonzac	Peter Blauner	January 9, 2013	1411	8.42
307	12	"Criminal Hatred"	Adam Bernstein	Ed Zuckerman	January 30, 2013	1412	6.42
308	13	"Monster's Legacy"	Jean de Segonzac	Story by : Warren Leight & Julie Martin; Teleplay by : John P. Roche	February 6, 2013	1414	5.23
309	14	"Secrets Exhumed"	Laura Belsey	Warren Leight & Julie Martin	February 13, 2013	1413	6.35
310	15	"Deadly Ambition"	Jim McKay	Story by : Peter Blauner & Kevin Fox; Teleplay by : Warren Leight & Julie Martin	February 20, 2013	1415	5.61
311	16	"Funny Valentine"	Jean de Segonzac	Gwendolyn Parker	February 27, 2013	1416	5.44
312	17	"Undercover Blue"	Michael Smith	Ed Zuckerman & Aaron Tracy	March 20, 2013	1417	5.51
313	18	"Legitimate Rape"	Jonathan Herron	Kevin Fox & Peter Blauner	March 27, 2013	1418	6.61
314	19	"Born Psychopath"	Alex Chapple	Julie Martin & Warren Leight	April 3, 2013	1419	6.34
315	20	"Girl Dishonored"	Holly Dale	Story by : Warren Leight & Julie Martin; Teleplay by : Robert Brooks Cohen	April 24, 2013	1420	7.35
316	21	"Traumatic Wound"	Alex Zakrzewski	Gwendolyn Parker & John P. Roche	May 1, 2013	1421	5.72
317	22	"Poisoned Motive"	Arthur W. Forney	Story by : Warren Leight; Teleplay by : Julie Martin & Ed Zuckerman	May 8, 2013	1422	6.91
318	23	"Brief Interlude"	Kevin Bray	Story by : Peter Blauner, Kevin Fox, & Pedro Garcia; Teleplay by : Peter Blauner & Kevin Fox	May 15, 2013	1423	6.48
319	24	"Her Negotiation"	Norberto Barba	Julie Martin & Warren Leight	May 22, 2013	1424	6.66

=== Season 15 (2013–2014) ===
- Raúl Esparza (ADA Rafael Barba) is promoted to the main cast.
- Richard Belzer (Sergeant John Munch) departs the main cast after the fifth episode.
- Dann Florek (Captain Don Cragen) departs the main cast after the eleventh episode.

Law & Order: Special Victims Unit season 15 episodes
No. overall	No. in season	Title	Directed by	Written by	Original release date	Prod. code	U.S. viewers (millions)
320	1	"Surrender Benson"	Michael Smith	Warren Leight & Julie Martin	September 25, 2013	1501	9.58
321	2	"Imprisoned Lives"	Michael Slovis	Julie Martin & Warren Leight	September 25, 2013	1502	9.58
322	3	"American Tragedy"	Fred Berner	Story by : Jill Abbinanti; Teleplay by : Warren Leight & Julie Martin	October 2, 2013	1503	6.85
323	4	"Internal Affairs"	Jean de Segonzac	Kevin Fox	October 9, 2013	1504	6.31
324	5	"Wonderland Story"	Jennifer Getzinger	Story by : Ed Zuckerman & Lawrence Kaplow; Teleplay by : Warren Leight & Julie Martin	October 16, 2013	1505	7.48
325	6	"October Surprise"	Peter Werner	Story by : Warren Leight & Peter Blauner; Teleplay by : Peter Blauner	October 23, 2013	1506	5.53
326	7	"Dissonant Voices"	Alex Chapple	John P. Roche	November 6, 2013	1507	5.65
327	8	"Military Justice"	Tom DiCillo	Lawrence Kaplow	November 13, 2013	1508	6.16
328	9	"Rapist Anonymous"	Steve Shill	Julie Martin & Warren Leight	November 20, 2013	1509	5.97
329	10	"Psycho/Therapist"	Michael Slovis	Warren Leight & Julie Martin	January 8, 2014	1510	8.81
330	11	"Amaro's One-Eighty"	Nick Gomez	Story by : Warren Leight & Julie Martin; Teleplay by : Kevin Fox	January 15, 2014	1511	5.44
331	12	"Jersey Breakdown"	Jonathan Herron	Story by : Julie Martin & Céline C. Robinson; Teleplay by : Céline C. Robinson	January 22, 2014	1512	6.68
332	13	"Betrayal's Climax"	Holly Dale	Jill Abbinanti	January 29, 2014	1513	7.59
333	14	"Wednesday's Child"	Laura Belsey	Story by : Peter Blauner & Warren Leight; Teleplay by : Peter Blauner	February 5, 2014	1514	6.24
334	15	"Comic Perversion"	Alex Chapple	Story by : Brianna Yellen, Julie Martin, & Warren Leight; Teleplay by : Brianna Yellen	February 26, 2014	1515	7.78
335	16	"Gridiron Soldier"	Jean de Segonzac	Story by : John P. Roche & Julie Martin; Teleplay by : John P. Roche	March 5, 2014	1516	6.01
336	17	"Gambler's Fallacy"	Alex Chapple	Story by : Kevin Fox; Teleplay by : Julie Martin & Warren Leight	March 12, 2014	1517	6.28
337	18	"Criminal Stories"	Mariska Hargitay	Story by : Warren Leight & Julie Martin; Teleplay by : Peter Blauner	March 19, 2014	1518	5.82
338	19	"Downloaded Child"	Adam Bernstein	Story by : Julie Martin & Warren Leight; Teleplay by : Jill Abbinanti	April 2, 2014	1519	5.90
339	20	"Beast's Obsession"	Steve Shill	Warren Leight & Julie Martin	April 9, 2014	1520	7.41
340	21	"Post-Mortem Blues"	Michael Slovis	Julie Martin & Warren Leight	April 30, 2014	1521	6.20
341	22	"Reasonable Doubt"	Alex Chapple	Kevin Fox & Robert Brooks Cohen	May 7, 2014	1522	5.34
342	23	"Thought Criminal"	Adam Bernstein	Story by : Peter Blauner, Julie Martin, & Warren Leight; Teleplay by : Peter Blauner	May 14, 2014	1523	5.42
343	24	"Spring Awakening"	Norberto Barba	Story by : Warren Leight, Julie Martin, & Kevin Fox; Teleplay by : Warren Leight & Julie Martin	May 21, 2014	1524	6.39

=== Season 16 (2014–2015) ===
- Peter Scanavino joins as a recurring guest for the first three episodes, portraying Det. Dominick "Sonny" Carisi, Jr. He is promoted to the main cast in the fifth episode.
- Danny Pino (Det. Nick Amaro) departs the cast after the season finale ("Surrendering Noah").

Law & Order: Special Victims Unit season 16 episodes
No. overall	No. in season	Title	Directed by	Written by	Original release date	Prod. code	U.S. viewers (millions)
344	1	"Girls Disappeared"	Alex Chapple	Story by : Warren Leight & Julie Martin; Teleplay by : Robert Brooks Cohen & Kevin Fox	September 24, 2014	1601	10.07
345	2	"American Disgrace"	Arthur W. Forney	Warren Leight & Julie Martin	October 1, 2014	1602	7.73
346	3	"Producer's Backend"	Michael Pressman	Story by : Julie Martin & Warren Leight; Teleplay by : Jill Abbinanti & Brianna Yellen	October 8, 2014	1603	7.55
347	4	"Holden's Manifesto"	Jean de Segonzac	Story by : Kevin Fox; Teleplay by : Julie Martin & Warren Leight	October 15, 2014	1604	7.16
348	5	"Pornstar's Requiem"	Jennifer Getzinger	Story by : Kevin Fox & Warren Leight; Teleplay by : Robert Brooks Cohen & Céline C. Robinson	October 22, 2014	1605	7.19
349	6	"Glasgowman's Wrath"	Jean de Segonzac	Story by : Julie Martin & Warren Leight; Teleplay by : Brianna Yellen & Jill Abbinanti	November 5, 2014	1606	7.00
350	7	"Chicago Crossover"	Steve Shill	Story by : Dick Wolf & Warren Leight; Teleplay by : Ed Zuckerman	November 12, 2014	1607	10.01
351	8	"Spousal Privilege"	Sharat Raju	Story by : Warren Leight & Julie Martin; Teleplay by : Julie Martin & Samantha Corbin-Miller	November 19, 2014	1608	7.93
352	9	"Pattern Seventeen"	Martha Mitchell	Kevin Fox	December 10, 2014	1609	6.90
353	10	"Forgiving Rollins"	Michael Slovis	Julie Martin & Warren Leight	January 7, 2015	1610	7.76
354	11	"Agent Provocateur"	Alex Chapple	Samantha Corbin-Miller	January 14, 2015	1611	6.68
355	12	"Padre Sandunguero"	Mariska Hargitay	Story by : Peter Blauner & Warren Leight; Teleplay by : Peter Blauner	January 21, 2015	1612	6.77
356	13	"Decaying Morality"	Michael Pressman	Kevin Fox & Brianna Yellen	February 4, 2015	1613	6.20
357	14	"Intimidation Game"	Jean de Segonzac	Story by : Julie Martin, Céline C. Robinson, & Robert Brooks Cohen; Teleplay by : Céline C. Robinson & Robert Brooks Cohen	February 11, 2015	1614	6.12
358	15	"Undercover Mother"	Steve Shill	Warren Leight & Julie Martin	February 18, 2015	1615	6.45
359	16	"December Solstice"	Sharat Raju	Ed Zuckerman	February 25, 2015	1616	7.72
360	17	"Parole Violations"	Jean de Segonzac	Jill Abbinanti	March 25, 2015	1617	5.92
361	18	"Devastating Story"	Michael Slovis	Samantha Corbin-Miller	April 1, 2015	1618	6.25
362	19	"Granting Immunity"	Holly Dale	Story by : Julie Martin & Warren Leight; Teleplay by : Brianna Yellen & A. Zell Williams	April 8, 2015	1619	7.31
363	20	"Daydream Believer"	Martha Mitchell	Story by : Warren Leight & Matt Olmstead; Teleplay by : Julie Martin & Ed Zuckerman	April 29, 2015	1620	9.28
364	21	"Perverted Justice"	Alex Chapple	Story by : Warren Leight & Julie Martin; Teleplay by : Robert Brooks Cohen & Céline C. Robinson	May 6, 2015	1621	6.11
365	22	"Parents' Nightmare"	Jean de Segonzac	Kevin Fox & Brendan Feeney	May 13, 2015	1622	6.82
366	23	"Surrendering Noah"	Michael Slovis	Julie Martin & Warren Leight	May 20, 2015	1623	6.96

=== Season 17 (2015–2016) ===
- Andy Karl has a continuous arc as Sergeant Mike Dodds starting with "Maternal Instincts" to "Heartfelt Passages".
- BD Wong reprised his role as Dr. George Huang in the episode "Depravity Standard". This was his fourth appearance on the show since his departure at the end of season 12.
- Warren Leight leaves the show as executive producer at the end of the season.
- Richard Belzer makes his final appearance as Detective John Munch in the episode “Fashionable Crimes”

Law & Order: Special Victims Unit season 17 episodes
No. overall	No. in season	Title	Directed by	Written by	Original release date	Prod. code	U.S. viewers (millions)
367	1	"Devil's Dissections"	Jean de Segonzac	Story by : Kevin Fox; Teleplay by : Warren Leight & Julie Martin	September 23, 2015	1701	8.27
368	2	"Criminal Pathology"	Alex Chapple	Story by : Kevin Fox; Teleplay by : Julie Martin & Warren Leight	September 23, 2015	1702	8.27
369	3	"Transgender Bridge"	Arthur W. Forney	Story by : Julie Martin & Warren Leight; Teleplay by : Jill Abbinanti & Céline C. Robinson	September 30, 2015	1703	6.69
370	4	"Institutional Fail"	Martha Mitchell	Story by : Samantha Corbin-Miller; Teleplay by : Julie Martin & Brianna Yellen	October 7, 2015	1704	7.00
371	5	"Community Policing"	Jean de Segonzac	Story by : Kevin Fox; Teleplay by : Warren Leight & A. Zell Williams	October 14, 2015	1705	6.20
372	6	"Maternal Instincts"	Michael Pressman	Story by : Robert Brooks Cohen; Teleplay by : Warren Leight & Julie Martin	October 21, 2015	1706	6.33
373	7	"Patrimonial Burden"	Martha Mitchell	Story by : Warren Leight & Julie Martin; Teleplay by : Jill Abbinanti & Céline C. Robinson	November 4, 2015	1707	6.55
374	8	"Melancholy Pursuit"	Michael Pressman	Story by : Brianna Yellen & Samantha Corbin-Miller; Teleplay by : Warren Leight & Julie Martin	November 11, 2015	1708	7.76
375	9	"Depravity Standard"	Martha Mitchell	Ed Zuckerman	November 18, 2015	1709	6.29
376	10	"Catfishing Teacher"	Michael Slovis	Kevin Fox	January 6, 2016	1710	7.84
377	11	"Townhouse Incident"	Nick Gomez	Brianna Yellen	January 13, 2016	1711	8.01
378	12	"A Misunderstanding"	Mariska Hargitay	Céline C. Robinson	January 20, 2016	1712	6.91
379	13	"Forty-One Witnesses"	Michael Pressman	Robert Brooks Cohen	February 3, 2016	1713	7.31
380	14	"Nationwide Manhunt"	Alex Chapple	Warren Leight & Julie Martin	February 10, 2016	1714	7.59
381	15	"Collateral Damages"	Rosemary Rodriguez	Samantha Corbin-Miller	February 17, 2016	1715	7.73
382	16	"Star-Struck Victims"	Michael Pressman	A. Zell Williams	February 24, 2016	1716	6.47
383	17	"Manhattan Transfer"	Alex Chapple	Story by : Julie Martin & Warren Leight; Teleplay by : Kevin Fox & Brendan Feeney	March 2, 2016	1717	6.86
384	18	"Unholiest Alliance"	Jean de Segonzac	Story by : Kevin Fox & Brendan Feeney; Teleplay by : Warren Leight & Julie Martin	March 23, 2016	1718	6.11
385	19	"Sheltered Outcasts"	Mariska Hargitay	Ed Zuckerman	March 30, 2016	1719	6.07
386	20	"Fashionable Crimes"	Martha Mitchell	Penelope Koechl & Jill Lorie Hurst	May 4, 2016	1720	5.26
387	21	"Assaulting Reality"	Alex Chapple	Story by : Brianna Yellen & Robert Brooks Cohen; Teleplay by : Julie Martin, Warren Leight, Brianna Yellen, & Robert Brooks Cohen	May 11, 2016	1721	6.06
388	22	"Intersecting Lives"	Jonathan Starch	Julie Martin & Warren Leight	May 18, 2016	1722	5.78
389	23	"Heartfelt Passages"	Alex Chapple	Warren Leight & Julie Martin	May 25, 2016	1723	7.19

=== Season 18 (2016–2017) ===
- Rick Eid takes over as executive producer. In May 2017, it was announced that he would depart the series as executive producer at the end of this season.

Law & Order: Special Victims Unit season 18 episodes
No. overall	No. in season	Title	Directed by	Written by	Original release date	Prod. code	U.S. viewers (millions)
390	1	"Terrorized"	Alik Sakharov	Rick Eid & Julie Martin	September 21, 2016	1801	7.83
391	2	"Making a Rapist"	Michael Pressman	Kevin Fox	September 28, 2016	1802	6.09
392	3	"Imposter"	Jean de Segonzac	Rick Eid & Gavin Harris	October 5, 2016	1803	5.76
393	4	"Heightened Emotions"	Alex Chapple	Julie Martin & Céline C. Robinson	October 12, 2016	1805	5.88
394	5	"Rape Interrupted"	Michael Pressman	Julie Martin & Brianna Yellen	October 26, 2016	1806	5.85
395	6	"Broken Rhymes"	Adam Bernstein	Rick Eid & Jeffrey Baker	November 9, 2016	1807	5.55
396	7	"Next Chapter"	Fred Berner	Rick Eid & Gavin Harris	January 4, 2017	1809	5.82
397	8	"Chasing Theo"	Jean de Segonzac	Julie Martin & Robert Brooks Cohen	January 11, 2017	1810	6.05
398	9	"Decline and Fall"	Jean de Segonzac	Ed Zuckerman & Robert Brooks Cohen	January 18, 2017	1811	6.46
399	10	"Motherly Love"	Mariska Hargitay	Rick Eid & Julie Martin	February 8, 2017	1812	6.93
400	11	"Great Expectations"	Martha Mitchell	Kevin Fox & Brendan Feeney	February 15, 2017	1808	6.00
401	12	"No Surrender"	Stephanie Marquardt	Gavin Harris & Kinan Copen	February 22, 2017	1813	5.76
402	13	"Genes"	Michael Pressman	Rick Eid & Céline C. Robinson	March 22, 2017	1815	5.19
403	14	"Net Worth"	Alex Chapple	Rick Eid & Jeffrey Baker	March 29, 2017	1816	5.00
404	15	"Know It All"	Jonathan Herron	Ed Zuckerman & Kevin Fox	April 5, 2017	1814	5.07
405	16	"The Newsroom"	Jono Oliver	Story by : Warren Leight & Julie Martin; Teleplay by : Julie Martin & Brianna Yellen	April 26, 2017	1817	5.22
406	17	"Real Fake News"	Martha Mitchell	Ed Zuckerman	May 3, 2017	1818	5.06
407	18	"Spellbound"	Jean de Segonzac	Gavin Harris & Kinan Copen	May 10, 2017	1819	5.01
408	19	"Conversion"	Alex Chapple	Kevin Fox & Brendan Feeney	May 17, 2017	1820	5.56
409	20	"American Dream"	Jean de Segonzac	Rick Eid & Julie Martin	May 24, 2017	1821	5.80
410	21	"Sanctuary"	Michael Pressman	Rick Eid & Julie Martin	May 24, 2017	1822	6.22

=== Season 19 (2017–2018) ===
- Sam Waterston reprises his role as District Attorney Jack McCoy in the episode "The Undiscovered Country".
- Michael S. Chernuchin takes over as executive producer.
- Philip Winchester joins the cast in the thirteenth episode as Peter Stone following the cancellation of Chicago Justice.
- Raúl Esparza departs the cast in the 13th episode, "The Undiscovered Country".

Law & Order: Special Victims Unit season 19 episodes
No. overall	No. in season	Title	Directed by	Written by	Original release date	Prod. code	U.S. viewers (millions)
411	1	"Gone Fishin'"	Alex Chapple	Michael Chernuchin	September 27, 2017	1901	5.67
412	2	"Mood"	Michael Pressman	Allison Intrieri	October 4, 2017	1902	5.82
413	3	"Contrapasso"	Jean de Segonzac	Richard Sweren	October 11, 2017	1903	5.79
414	4	"No Good Reason"	Martha Mitchell	Julie Martin & Brianna Yellen	October 18, 2017	1904	5.58
415	5	"Complicated"	Tricia Brock	Céline C. Robinson	October 25, 2017	1905	5.81
416	6	"Unintended Consequences"	Jonathan Herron	Elizabeth Rinehart	November 8, 2017	1906	4.97
417	7	"Something Happened"	Alex Chapple	Michael Chernuchin	November 29, 2017	1907	7.07
418	8	"Intent"	Adam Bernstein	Lawrence Kaplow & Robert Brooks Cohen	December 6, 2017	1908	6.18
419	9	"Gone Baby Gone"	Jean de Segonzac	Lawrence Kaplow & Elizabeth Rinehart	January 3, 2018	1909	6.23
420	10	"Pathological"	Jono Oliver	Brianna Yellen	January 10, 2018	1910	6.06
421	11	"Flight Risk"	Michael Pressman	Julie Martin & Allison Intrieri	January 17, 2018	1911	6.21
422	12	"Info Wars"	Michael Slovis	Richard Sweren & Robert Brooks Cohen	January 31, 2018	1912	5.48
423	13	"The Undiscovered Country"	Alex Chapple	Michael Chernuchin	February 7, 2018	1913	6.64
424	14	"Chasing Demons"	Fred Berner	Richard Sweren & Allison Intrieri	February 28, 2018	1914	5.55
425	15	"In Loco Parentis"	Norberto Barba	Michael Chernuchin & Julie Martin	March 7, 2018	1915	5.51
426	16	"Dare"	Christopher Misiano	Richard Sweren & Céline C. Robinson	March 14, 2018	1916	6.13
427	17	"Send in the Clowns"	Alex Chapple	Julie Martin & Brianna Yellen	March 21, 2018	1917	6.51
428	18	"Service"	Fred Berner	Lawrence Kaplow & Céline C. Robinson	April 11, 2018	1918	5.43
429	19	"Sunk Cost Fallacy"	Michael Pressman	Michael Chernuchin & Allison Intrieri	April 18, 2018	1919	6.58
430	20	"The Book of Esther"	Jean de Segonzac	Richard Sweren & Ryan Causey	May 2, 2018	1920	6.25
431	21	"Guardian"	Stephanie Marquardt	Julie Martin & Matt Klypka	May 9, 2018	1921	5.71
432	22	"Mama"	Jean de Segonzac	Lawrence Kaplow & Elizabeth Rinehart	May 16, 2018	1922	5.31
433	23	"Remember Me"	Alex Chapple	Michael Chernuchin & Julie Martin	May 23, 2018	1923	6.12
434	24	"Remember Me Too"	Alex Chapple	Michael Chernuchin & Julie Martin	May 23, 2018	1924	6.12

== Home video releases ==
Season	Episodes	DVD release dates					
Season	Episodes	Region 1	Discs	Region 2	Discs	Region 4	Discs
1	22	October 21, 2003	6	February 28, 2005	6	January 19, 2005	6
2	21	September 27, 2005	3	November 21, 2005	6	March 8, 2006	6
3	23	January 30, 2007	5	July 23, 2007	6	August 1, 2007	6
4	25	December 4, 2007	5	September 10, 2007	6	November 21, 2007	6
5	25	September 14, 2004	4	June 16, 2008	6	July 2, 2008	6
6	23	April 1, 2008	5	September 22, 2008	6	December 3, 2008	5
7	22	July 29, 2008	5	February 16, 2009	5	March 4, 2009	5
8	22	February 17, 2009	5	April 13, 2009	5	June 3, 2009	5
9	19	May 26, 2009	5	August 31, 2009	5	September 30, 2009	5
10	22	September 22, 2009	5	December 28, 2009	5	February 4, 2010	5
11	24	September 21, 2010	5	January 16, 2017	6	December 1, 2010	5
12	24	September 27, 2011	5	January 16, 2017	6	December 7, 2011	5
13	23	September 25, 2012	5	February 27, 2017	6	November 28, 2012	6
14	24	September 24, 2013	5	February 27, 2017	6	November 7, 2013	6
15	24	September 23, 2014	5	March 27, 2017	6	December 4, 2014	6
16	23	August 11, 2015	5	March 27, 2017	6	December 11, 2015	6
17	23	September 13, 2016	5	November 28, 2016	5	October 12, 2016	6
18	21	February 13, 2018	4	TBA	TBA	December 6, 2017	4
19	24	September 4, 2018	4	TBA	TBA	September 26, 2018	4
20	24	September 10, 2019	4	TBA	TBA	September 18, 2019	6
21	20	July 7, 2020	4	TBA	TBA	September 23, 2020	5
22	16	July 20, 2021	4	TBA	TBA	September 22, 2021	4
23	22	July 12, 2022	4	TBA	TBA	October 12, 2022	4
24	22	October 3, 2023	5	TBA	TBA	October 11, 2023	6
25	13	September 10, 2024	3	TBA	TBA	November 13, 2024	3
26	22	September 23, 2025	5	TBA	TBA	November 5, 2025	6
27	21	September 29, 2026	5	TBA	TBA	TBA	TBA
