= List of Law & Order: Special Victims Unit episodes =

List of Law & Order: Special Victims Unit episodes may refer to:

- List of Law & Order: Special Victims Unit episodes (seasons 1–19)
- List of Law & Order: Special Victims Unit episodes (season 20–present)
