= They'd Already Disappeared =

- Law & Order: Special Victims Unit episode
- Episode no.: Season 23; Episode 7
- Directed by: Bethany Rooney
- Written by: Kathy Dobie and Micharne Cloughley
- Original air date: November 4, 2021

Guest appearances
- Terry Serpico as Tommy McGrath; Frank Wood as M.E. Abel Truman; Melvin Abston as Country Jones; Blake DeLong as Trace Lambert; Camila Cano-Flavia as Daria Cruz; Dela Meskienyar as Tania Cruz

Episode chronology
← Previous "The Five Hundredth Episode"	Next → "Nightmares in Drill City"
- Law & Order: Special Victims Unit season 23

"They'd Already Disappeared" is the seventh episode of the twenty-third season of Law & Order: Special Victims Unit. The episode aired on November 4, 2021, on NBC. The episode focuses on a serial killer who is targeting sex workers and highlights how some members of police do not take crimes against sex workers seriously. Octavio Pisano is promoted to the regular cast as of this episode. The episode garnered favorable reviews with one review saying it was "one of the most powerful episodes in recent years". The episode was watched by 4.42 million when it aired in USA.

== Premise ==
Episode starts with a woman, Tania Cruz being kicked out of a place because she only wanted to use the restroom and not be a customer of the business, she apologizes to her friend for not being able to get a coffee. The woman goes and meets her sister, who refuses to give her money in case it’s for drugs but does give her a backpack with supplies. She enters a restaurant where the owner is keeping her coat and he agrees to keep her backpack for her, he tries to offer her food, but she insists she’s going on a date. The date goes wrong and she flees to behind a dumpster and calls her sister to inform her she was raped but her attacker catches up with her and kidnaps her.

At the squad room, Fin Tutuola asks Olivia Benson about her meeting with boss Tommy McGrath when Daria, the woman's sister appears demanding to speak with a police officer. Amanda Rollins and Joe Velasco get involved in starting the case. Daria plays the voicemail from her sister to Rollins and Benson who want to get the phone number to track the phone. Daria informs them that her sister is a survival sex worker. Rollins and Velsasco go to a homeless shelter where a worker is shocked that the police are taking the disappearance seriously, she brings two women called Snowflake and Missy to speak the police and all they can help with is sending them to another sex worker who might be able to help. The worker explains how she gave her advice on how to survive on the streets. Tutuola visits the restaurant where she left her backpack, the owner, Country explains how he looks after the sex worker's possessions when they have no place to keep their things, he then gives Tutuola Tania's backpack.

Two more sex workers come to the squad room to inform the detectives that another worker has gone missing, Benson and Velasco take their statements and they equally get worried. Benson sends Velasco and Rollins to the precinct in East Harlem to find out if there is any more missing women where the officer on the desk informs them that the sergeant has gone home for the night but a detective gave them a file which is marked "NHI" or "No Humans Involved" to which both Velasco and Rollins are disgusted. Going through the file of missing women, they see three that could fit the offender's type as Rollins deducts that they’re looking for a serial killer.

Back at the squad, Benson and the team discuss the cases and the lack of investigation when she and Tutuola go to speak with Medical Examiner Truman who thinks he has two cases that match the victimology from ten years prior. Due to the methodology of one of the cases, they look into Country where they learn he has a prior conviction in South Carolina. They take him into the interrogation room where they see from traffic cameras that he had Tania in his car due to him giving her a lift to her date, he gives them the address.

Rollins and Velasco go to the address where Velasco feels they’re being led on a wild goose chase. They speak to a local kid who thinks there’s a vampire living in an abandoned building and might’ve seen Tania but can’t be sure. They decide to investigate the abandoned building and discover mummified bodies. Both are visibly disturbed and then they find both missing girls lying dead on slabs. Benson and Tutuola come with the crime scene technicians to investigate the crimes, Truman reveals that the bodies where mummified DIY. McGrath arrives, disgusted and disturbed at the scene he instructs her to make the case as he calls the scene evil. Velasco checks on Benson where he feels she has seen scenes like this before where she admits she’s never seen anything like it and highlights you never get used to any of the cases they work.

When Benson and Tutuola reinterview Country and show him the photos of the mummified bodies he is clearly disturbed and pleads with them to take the photos away. Benson still makes clear they’ll be searching his restaurant for any property belonging to any of the victims they’ve identified from the scene. He ends up recognizing another victim from a photo of them before they went missing and admitted he took her to a date in the same location. He breaks down and cries. Truman calls them to inform them that he has been able to identify two victims one from Jersey and another from Connecticut. When reading a report, Benson learns that both women disappeared when Country was in prison in South Carolina.

Benson and McGrath hold a press conference to appeal for information while Velasco and Tutuola speak to the kid who told them about the abandoned building and he was able to tell them that the killer is white who drives a pickup truck. Meanwhile Daria goes to the morgue to identify her sister where Truman has a method to help her not be traumatized by the sight of Tania's dead body. Benson commends him for his advice.

Benson and Tutuola travel to Enfield, Connecticut to speak to a victim's mother where she explains that her grandson, the victim's son has autism. Her mother explains that she had a type for "bad boys" and that the last man she ran off with was a carny where the child remembers facts about the day his mother left and the number plate of the vehicle she left in. Upon the information given, Velasco and Rollins go to the house in Jersey of the vehicle owner, Trace Lambert and find him and his mother. He comes to New York to speak to them, but his mother insists on coming along. At the squad room, Velasco reads through his record. Benson asks Velasco to speak with the mother while Tutuola and Rollins interrogate Trace. Benson enters Velasco's interview with his mother who doesn’t think much of her son and after hearing from her, she enters the interview with Trace and gives Tutuola and Rollins a break. Benson tells him everything his mother says about him. Benson belittles Trace until he confesses to his crimes and admits that he killed the owner of the building he stored the bodies in. During his confession he admits to details about the last moments of his victims.

Truman informs the squad that he managed to identify two more victims. Where makes clear he will continue to try and identify the others.

== Development ==
Octavio Pisano was promoted to the regular cast as of this episode. His announcement to the regular cast was announced October 2021, with the comment of "We'll be seeing more of Octavio Pisano on Law & Order: SVU. Pisano, who portrays Detective Joe Velasco, has been promoted to series regular on the NBC procedural. Pisano's Joe Velasco is a former undercover and detective under Chief McGrath (Terry Serpico) who's been assigned to the SVU. Pisano has appeared in 3 episodes so far, beginning with the season 23 premiere."

The episode stars Mariska Hargitay as Olivia Benson, Ice-T as Odafin "Fin" Tutuola, Kelli Giddish as Amanda Rollins and Octavio Pisano as Joe Velasco. Peter Scanavino who portrays Dominick Carisi, Jr. was credited with the main cast of this episode but did not appear.

== Reception ==
Shana, the reviewer for Fangirlish highlighted "The serial rapist and murderer featured in "They'd Already Disappeared" definitely didn't sleep on the "especially heinous" part." when discussing how you can quote the opening intro of every SVU episode. She added "All this is to say, though, that the task of keeping it all fresh has to be an incredibly difficult one, especially as the episode count continues to climb. Law & Order: SVU 23×07, however, certainly fit the bill."

Jack Ori of TVFanatic started his review of the episode by saying "Talk about a post-Halloween scare! Law & Order: SVU Season 23 Episode 7 was one of the creepiest, most disturbing cases the team has faced yet, and that's saying something considering that there are 23 years' worth of material!" He did find some criticism over the portrayal of an autistic character by saying "It was also lucky that one of the other victims' sons turned out to have a form of Autism that allowed him to recall the license plate perfectly several years later... Anyway, most Autistic people aren't savants with photographic memories, so it's annoying when TV dramas reinforce the stereotype that they are."

It was reported by Leila Kozma of Distractify that "Season 23, Episode 7 highlights the jaw-dropping insight and razor-sharp instincts needed to take down a vile serial killer suffering from a severe case of misogyny."

The episode is included in a list compiled by Melissa Boles of Comic Book Resources of the top 10 episodes of Special Victims Unit directed by a woman. The episode placed at number 3. Boles said about the episode "In one of the most powerful episodes in recent years, Rollins and newcomer Joe Velasco (Octavio Pisano) find themselves standing in the middle of a room of mummified bodies." She added, "The episode is a deep look at how disenfranchised women are targeted and is an interesting juxtaposition to SVU's Season 1, Episode 4, "Hysteria," where Olivia solves a 30-year-old case by discovering that the perp, an NYPD police officer, has been staging victims so they lined up like paper dolls. "They'd Already Disappeared" does a great job of showing just how much things have -- and haven't -- changed in 22 years."
