= Law & Order: Special Victims Unit season 4 =

Season of American television series (2002–2003)

Law & Order: Special Victims Unit
- Season 4
- Season 4 U.S. DVD cover
- Starring: Christopher Meloni; Mariska Hargitay; Richard Belzer; Stephanie March; Ice-T; BD Wong; Dann Florek
- No. of episodes: 25

Release
- Original network: NBC
- Original release: September 27, 2002 – May 16, 2003

Season chronology
- ← Previous; Season 3 Next → Season 5

The fourth season of the television series, Law & Order: Special Victims Unit premiered September 27, 2002 and ended May 16, 2003 on NBC. This was the last season of the series to air on Friday nights at 10pm/9c.

== Production ==
Filming for Season 4 began while Season 3 was still airing as evidenced by reports that Sharon Lawrence would appear on SVU in time for May sweeps.

In a 2012 interview for the show Media Mayhem, Neal Baer cited "Juvenile" as a script whose writing was relevant to still debated case law. In the episode, a well meaning boy is manipulated by a sociopathic classmate and charged with felony murder as a result — a topic that was addressed by Miller v. Alabama in the Supreme Court. In the same interview, Baer talked about the detectives having differing opinions on grey areas of the law. He opined that this contributed to NBC's willingness to let him delve into highly charged topics with no censorship and cited "Mercy" as an example.

== Cast changes and returning characters ==
After two seasons of being a recurring guest star, BD Wong (Dr. George Huang) was added to the opening credits of the fourth season. This was also the last full season to star Stephanie March as ADA Alexandra Cabot. Previous seasons had shown Christopher Meloni and Mariska Hargitay in every episode. The first episode to break this trend was "Rotten", which showed Detective Benson working primarily with Detective Tutuola.

Actor Chad Lowe who had previously guest starred in the second season returned to the set of SVU. However, instead of reprising his character, he directed the season finale. The episode "Dominance" introduced the CSU Captain Judith Siper played by actress and life science executive Caren Browning. Browning continued to appear in this role for the eight seasons that followed. As with Neal Baer, she stated that her role on SVU was beneficial to her job in the healthcare industry: "My work on the show has opened many doors and conversations with the press and clients — so there’s a real synergy there."

== Cast ==
=== Main ===
- Christopher Meloni as Senior Detective Elliot Stabler
- Mariska Hargitay as Junior Detective Olivia Benson
- Richard Belzer as Senior Detective John Munch
- Stephanie March as Assistant District Attorney Alexandra Cabot
- Ice-T as Junior Detective Odafin "Fin" Tutuola
- BD Wong as FBI Special Agent Dr. George Huang
- Dann Florek as Captain Donald "Don" Cragen

=== Crossover stars from Law & Order ===
- Dianne Wiest as Interim District Attorney Nora Lewin
- Fred Dalton Thompson as District Attorney Arthur Branch

=== Recurring ===
- Harvey Atkin as Judge Alan Ridenour
- Caren Browning as Crime Scene Unit Captain Judith Siper
- Robert John Burke as Internal Affairs Bureau Sergeant Ed Tucker
- Viola Davis as Defense Attorney Donna Emmett
- Illeana Douglas as Defense Attorney Gina Bernardo
- Ned Eisenberg as Defense Attorney Roger Kressler
- Joel de la Fuente as Technical Assistance Response Unit Technician Ruben Morales
- Jordan Gelber as Crime Scene Unit Forensics Technician David Layton
- Pam Grier as Assistant United States Attorney Claudia Williams
- Peter Hermann as Defense Attorney Trevor Langan
- Jill Marie Lawrence as Defense Attorney Cleo Conrad
- Judith Light as Bureau Chief Assistant District Attorney Elizabeth Donnelly
- David Lipman as Judge Arthur Cohen
- Joanna Merlin as Judge Lena Petrovsky
- Tom O'Rourke as Judge Mark Seligman
- Erik Palladino as Detective Dave Duethorn
- Juliet Adair Pritner as Officer Bailey
- Daniel Sunjata as Crime Scene Unit Forensics Technician Burt Trevor
- Sheila Tousey as Judge Danielle Larsen
- Tamara Tunie as Medical Examiner Dr. Melinda Warner
- Welly Yang as Crime Scene Unit Forensics Technician Georgie

=== Guest stars ===
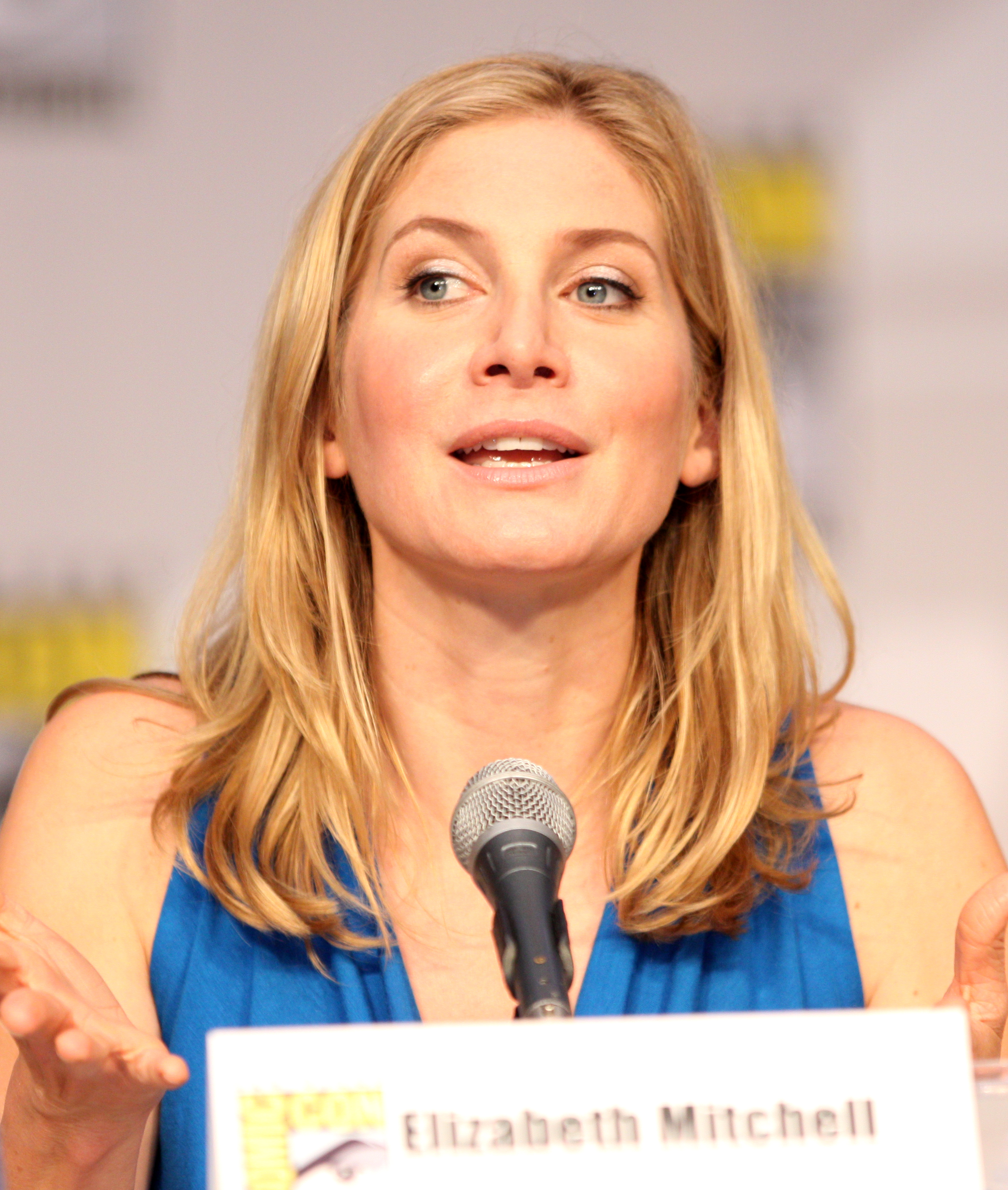
Elizabeth Mitchell, who made her first of two SVU guest appearances on Season 4, was already a fan of the series.

In the season premiere "Chameleon", Sharon Lawrence guest starred as Maggie Peterson, a psychotic prostitute who kills men after she sleeps with them. When discussing the role, Lawrence revealed that her "husband trained as a psychiatrist in a big county psych ward and was very helpful in researching that pathology. It was a great challenge to understand that character's mind." The decorated actress Pam Grier appeared in the fifth episode "Disappearing Acts". She appeared again in the fifteenth episode "Pandora" and was nominated for an NAACP Image Award for Outstanding Supporting Actress in a Drama Series for her time on SVU.

The episode "Angels" guest starred Pablo Santos as Ernesto Diaz, a Guatemalan boy who endured years of living as a sex slave. Of the previous SVU episodes focusing on child molestation, most of them were careful not to expose the child actors to the actual content of the sex crimes. However, Santos discussed several details in his episode as well as in an interview with Zap2it. According to Neal Baer, "We would never do it with, say, a 6-year-old, but we felt like, with a kid who's 15, he can articulate that. It's not something that 15-year-olds haven't heard about. We felt that it's all right." "Waste" explored the question of whether reproductive rights are retained by comatose patients. Bruce Davison and Lisa Pelikan played doctors in the episode marking the first joint appearance by the husband and wife. Philip Bosco's, whose character has Parkinson's disease, would later portray the same dementia in The Savages.

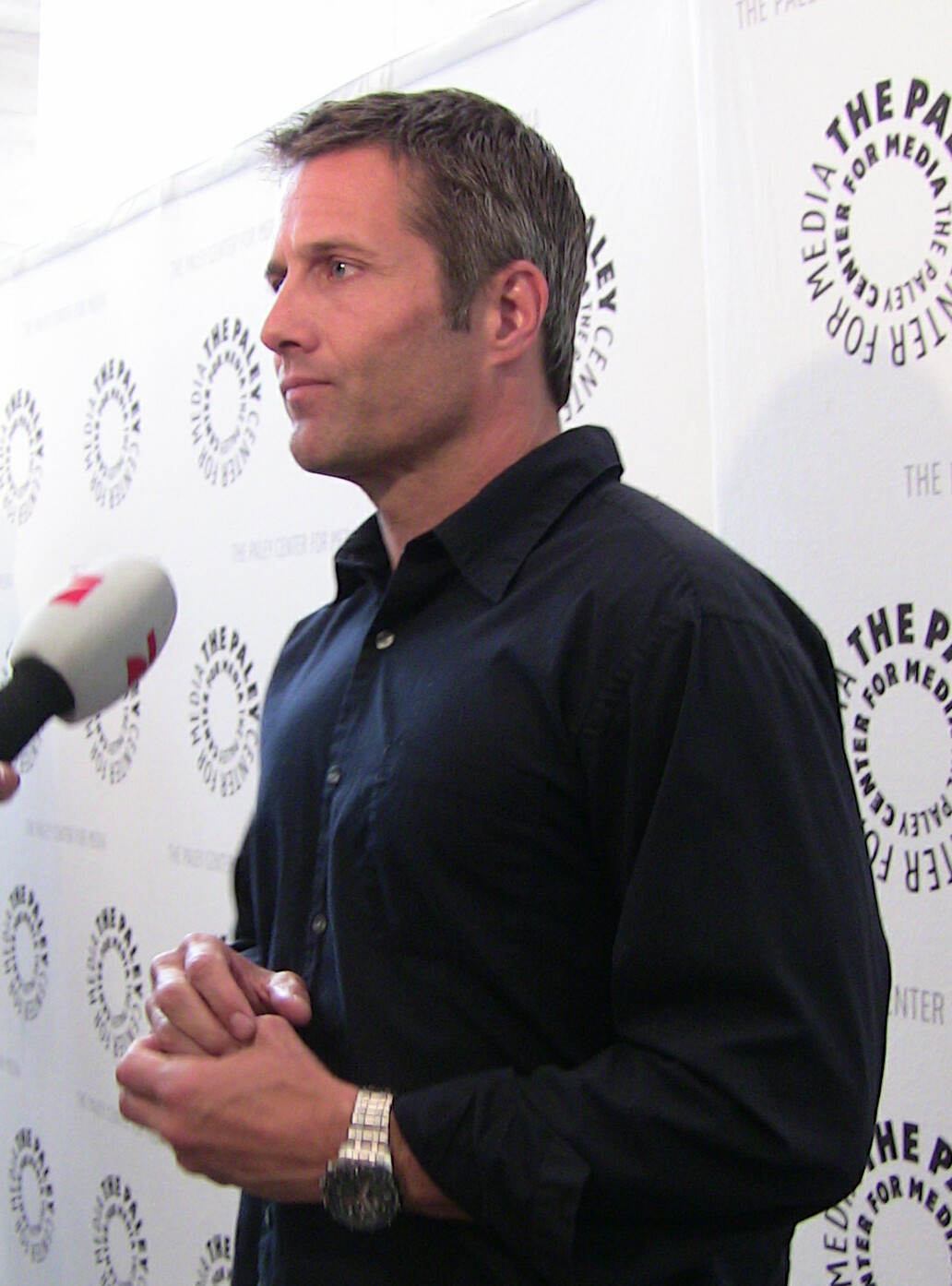
Rob Estes plays an abusive father his son fears to confront. Estes's performance was well received and considered for an Emmy.

Gloria Reuben guest starred in the episode, "Dolls" as the mother of a missing daughter. Reuben later went on to portray Bureau Chief Assistant District Attorney Christine Danielson in the ninth season and Assistant U.S. Attorney Christine Danielson in the twelfth. Concerning Reuben's Season 4 performance, Michael Buckley of TV Guide wrote "The scenes between Reuben and Ice-T are particularly good, and the detective bends the rules to try to help the agonizing mother." With the episode "Appearances", John Cullum guest starred as ADA Cabot's old law professor-turned-defense attorney Barry Moredock who comes in when defendants' civil and amendment rights are believed to be violated. This role became recurring for Cullum in later seasons. Rob Estes guest stars in "Desperate" as the prime suspect in his second wife's murder. Max Jansen Weinstein guest stars as a silent child in "Desperate", where he witnesses his stepmother's murder.

Jason Ritter made a guest appearance this season after his father appeared in season 3. His character in "Dominance" was a disturbed young adult, assisting in murders to gain the respect of his brother played by Ian Somerhalder. Their father is interpreted by Frank Langella.

In the episode "Fallacy", Kate Moennig played Cheryl Avery — a transgender woman who was born Charlie Avery. Moennig considered the show to be her initiation to New York City and said "You have to do Law and Order if you lived in New York!" In the episode "Perfect", Barbara Barrie was nominated for the Primetime Emmy Award for Outstanding Guest Actress in a Drama Series. She portrayed Mrs. Haggerty, one of the organizers of a cult who believes she is doing the right thing before having a change of heart at the end of the episode. This episode was the prime-time broadcast network debut for Gale Harold. In the final episode "Soulless", the detectives are on the trail of a vicious sociopath played by Logan Marshall-Green. The detectives have a debate about whether his character has a conscience, and in this scene, Mariska Hargitay was uncomfortable evoking the pessimistic point of view. Neal Baer told her "I'm sure you do [believe there is good in everyone] but Olivia Benson does not."

== Episodes ==
Law & Order: Special Victims Unit season 4 episodes
No. overall	No. in season	Title	Directed by	Written by	Original release date	Prod. code	U.S. viewers (millions)
67	1	"Chameleon"	Jean de Segonzac	Michele Fazekas & Tara Butters	September 27, 2002	E3151	14.88
The detectives go on the trail of a recently paroled rapist responsible for the murder of a sex worker during a raid at a men's club and are called to the scene where he was shot in self defense by his own gun. However, the murder weapon was also used in another crime while he was still in prison, leading the detectives to investigate the victim (Sharon Lawrence) through a trail of previously unsolved cases, a spending spree and another victim.: Special appearance by Dianne Wiest as DA Nora Lewin. This was the character's final appearance in the Law & Order franchise.
68	2	"Deception"	Constantine Makris	Michele Fazekas & Tara Butters	October 4, 2002	E3105	15.21
A family portrait painted by a kindergartner (Jennifer Michelle Brown) leads the detectives to investigate her mother for child sexual abuse of her teenage stepson (Jonathan Bennett). When the boy's father (Tom Mason) is found murdered, the focus of the investigation shifts to the boy and his stepmother (Sherilyn Fenn) goes to great lengths to protect him and prevent the detectives from learning the truth.
69	3	"Vulnerable"	Juan J. Campanella	Lisa Marie Petersen & Dawn DeNoon	October 11, 2002	E3104	15.91
When an elderly woman (Jane Powell) breaks into an apartment, the detectives discover she had been mistreated but have to investigate with no credible information from the victim because of Alzheimer's disease. They discover that she had been released from a nursing home to the custody of her financially scheming son (Jay Thomas) who becomes the prime suspect. However, they go back to the nursing home to find a pair of suspects, including the director (Mary Kay Place) who details the dangers faced by both patients and staff with her own heroics precariously standing out.
70	4	"Lust"	Michael Fields	Amanda Green	October 18, 2002	E3102	15.11
The wife of a retired attorney (Michael Gross), a public health doctor, is found murdered and raped in Central Park. Her work involved contacting sexual partners of HIV patients which gives the detectives a long list of suspects. The discovery of a second body in Central Park with the same signature shifts the focus to a serial killer; however, the trail leads to a man who has no knowledge of the crimes but has a distant connection to the doctor and her husband.
71	5	"Disappearing Acts"	Alex Zakrzewski	Judith McCreary	October 25, 2002	E3101	16.54
The detectives respond to a brutal rape only to have the victim (Caprice Benedetti) taken into custody by federal agents on racketeering charges. The investigation leads them to a father-son duo (John Heard and Tom Guiry) who are in the Federal Witness Protection Program and an agent (Pam Grier) who appears bound and determined to protect them, regardless of consequence, so they can testify against the Russian mob.
72	6	"Angels"	Arthur W. Forney	Jonathan Greene & Robert F. Campbell	November 1, 2002	E3106	15.34
The body of a battered young boy found in a luggage compartment of an airport shuttle bus sends the detectives to his guardian who was discovered to be a pedophile only to find his corpse in bed with his genitals removed. The subsequent investigation leads them to a travel agency specializing in exotic trips for sexual predators. Stabler is disgusted when he discovers that the man responsible for the murder and castration (Michael Hayden) is himself a child molester who killed a member of his own organization for using more coercion.
73	7	"Dolls"	Darnell Martin	Amanda Green	November 8, 2002	E3114	16.83
When the decomposing body of a sexually molested five-year-old girl is discovered, Benson's and Stabler's investigation leads them to the painful reality that they are searching for a serial child rapist (David Harbour) as they race to save the life of his latest victim. As the mother of the missing girl (Gloria Reuben) frantically awaits news of her daughter's whereabouts, she must reconcile the fact that her own recent bout with addiction may have played a part in her daughter's fate.
74	8	"Waste"	Donna Deitch	Dawn DeNoon & Lisa Marie Petersen	November 15, 2002	E3111	16.12
The investigation into the rape of a comatose woman leads to a doctor (Bruce Davison) whose stem cell research is funded by a billionaire (Philip Bosco) with Parkinson's disease who is desperate for a cure. The woman's parents (Henry Woronicz and JoBeth Williams) petition for custody of the child who was intended to be harvested for stem cells, while the defense argues that their experimentation on a patient who will probably never wake up serves the greater good.
75	9	"Juvenile"	Constantine Makris	Michele Fazekas & Tara Butters	November 22, 2002	E3112	14.46
A cancer patient who was growing marijuana in her apartment is found raped and murdered, sending the detectives on a hunt for two junior-high students (Shane Lyons and Connor Paolo), each blaming the other. The prosecution team is faced with the dilemma of trying the older boy as an adult, despite evidence that he was not mentally capable of being able to carry out the crimes.
76	10	"Resilience"	Joyce Chopra	Patrick Harbinson	December 6, 2002	E3113	16.22
When a fifteen-year-old girl (Rachael Bella) is saved from jumping in front of a train, the SVU is called in to help her. She falsely accuses an ex-boyfriend (Billy Lush) of raping her, but when the search turns to her dysfunctional family, surprise discoveries are made. From an overly helpful father (Titus Welliver), mysterious children and a bracelet that belonged to a murder victim, the detectives unravel a plot by the girl's parents to use children as surrogates.
77	11	"Damaged"	Juan J. Campanella	Barbie Kligman	January 10, 2003	E3109	16.60
When a six-year-old girl who was critically injured in an apparent robbery gone bad later dies and tests positive for a sexually transmitted disease, detectives investigate the family, the store clerk, and the son (Christopher Denham) of a prominent attorney (Michael Gaston) who had appeared to foil the crime. After evidence turns up that the little girl's older sister (Ari Graynor) was dating the alleged sexual predator, ADA Cabot attempts to eradicate the deal that had been made with the older sister for her testimony.
78	12	"Risk"	Juan J. Campanella	Robert F. Campbell & Jonathan Greene	January 17, 2003	E3115	16.26
When a baby dies after drinking baby formula found to be laced with cocaine, the detectives clash with Sgt Ed Tucker (Robert John Burke), who has been pursuing a drug syndicate smuggling cocaine in baby formula. Tutuola's experience in the Narcotics Division proves useful and Stabler is sent undercover as a potential dealer. The team is led to one of their own, Detective Brian Kendall (Matt Mulhern), a highly-decorated cop who has gone rogue. However, the operation hits a snag and Stabler is faced with a choice to either kill or be killed.
79	13	"Rotten"	Constantine Makris	Judith McCreary	January 24, 2003	E3119	16.08
In their investigation of a prisoner's death, Benson and Tutuola learn that he was assaulted before being incarcerated. They subsequently discover several killings of drug dealers in the precinct where the man was arrested, and that two cops (William Mapother and Terry Serpico) from this precinct had a connection to every case.
80	14	"Mercy"	David Platt	Christos N. Gage & Ruth C. Fletcher	January 31, 2003	E3118	15.50
When the body of a baby girl is found inside a cooler, the detectives need to investigate just who she is, and how she got there. They soon learn that the little girl had a genetic disorder known as Tay–Sachs disease that would lead to a painful death in childhood. When the parents (Elizabeth Mitchell and Gregg Edelman) admit to having killed their daughter humanely to spare her that fate, Cabot has to prosecute them for murder, despite reservations. Taking an interest in the case, Detective Munch sits in on the trial.
81	15	"Pandora"	Alex Zakrzewski	Michele Fazekas & Tara Butters	February 7, 2003	E3120	15.46
With Olivia tied up with a child moleststion case, Stabler and a homicide detective (William McNamara) work to solve the rape and brutal murder of a woman who turns out to be luring pedophiles into being arrested. The trail leads to a missing fourteen-year-old girl (Alexis Dziena) who was abducted by a foreign child pornographer (Lothaire Bluteau). The hunt takes Stabler to Prague, where Interpol is investigating the sex trade in Europe. When customers in New York are discovered, Stabler rescues a girl from the home of a child molester (Stephen Gevedon).
82	16	"Tortured"	Steve Shill	Lisa Marie Petersen & Dawn DeNoon	February 14, 2003	E3121	14.52
A Tibetan woman who was tortured in her home country is found murdered, with her foot missing. After an exhaustive search of potential suspects, the killer (Charlie Hofheimer) is found to be a victim of torture at the hands of his mother (Margaret Colin) who tried to use violence to cure him of his shoe fetish.
83	17	"Privilege"	Jean de Segonzac	Patrick Harbinson	February 21, 2003	E3122	14.98
Detectives Benson and Stabler are called to a crime scene – a young woman dressed in a maid's uniform has apparently committed suicide by jumping off a penthouse; however, because of the degree of sex-related bruising, they believe she might have been raped and murdered. The motive for murder is exposed when the detectives investigate a strange relationship between one of the penthouse occupants (Erik von Detten) and his grandmother (Michael Learned).
84	18	"Desperate"	David Platt	Amanda Green	March 14, 2003	E3124	16.48
After a young boy (Max Jansen Weinstein) witnesses the brutal sexual assault, rape, and murder of his stepmother (Amy Dorris), his biological father (Rob Estes) blocks the efforts of the detectives to question him. The boy is unable to speak due to fear and trauma of his father. The boy's father is the prime suspect in his second wife's murder. Although the court order to compel the boy's testimony succeeds, the judge still orders SVU not to talk to the boy. Since there is not much time before the trial begins, a desperate effort is carried out to put the boy back into contact with his biological mother (Signy Coleman) who disappeared 3 years ago with the help of a support network for victims of domestic violence. After the boy talks to his mother, she gives him courage to reveal the identity of his stepmother's killer.
85	19	"Appearances"	Alex Zakrzewski	Story by : Liz Friedman, Vanessa Place, & Stephen Belber; Teleplay by : Stephen Belber	March 28, 2003	E3110	15.31
On a field trip, a student tells his teacher about a suit-case he found. The teacher immediately contacts NYPD to call the bomb squad out. The police find the body of a little girl inside the suit-case. The case is then handed over to Detectives Elliot Stabler and Olivia Benson. They discover that the girl was on the beauty pageant circuit. One of the suspects tells the detectives how he came across a way to kill the girl. A pornographer (Brian Kerwin) is put on trial for giving instructions on how to kill via an alleged child porn story on his company's website. The material is found to fall outside the letter of child pornography laws since it consists of images of models that have been digitally altered to appear under age. The implications for freedom of expression prompt Cabot's former mentor to aid the defense.
86	20	"Dominance"	Steve Shill	Robert F. Campbell & Jonathan Greene	April 4, 2003	E3123	15.85
A quadruple homicide with sexual overtones is just the start of an intense rampage of killings that brings a homicide detective into the mix. As the entire squad races against time to prevent further murders, the evidence leads Tutuola to a building superintendent (Frank Langella), his two sons (Ian Somerhalder and Jason Ritter) and a cross to bear.
87	21	"Fallacy"	Juan J. Campanella	Story by : Josh Kotcheff & Barbie Kligman; Teleplay by : Barbie Kligman	April 18, 2003	E3117	14.84
Benson and Stabler try to prove self-defense when a rape victim (Katherine Moennig) kills her attacker. Events take an unusual turn when they learn that the victim is transgender. The victim's boyfriend (Chad Lindberg) is shocked to learn this and commits suicide. When the woman's lifelong anguish is detailed in court, Cabot begins to feel guilty about sending her to prison (which would be a male prison for a pre-op transgender woman).: Special appearance by Fred Thompson as DA Arthur Branch.
88	22	"Futility"	Alex Zakrzewski	Michele Fazekas & Tara Butters	April 25, 2003	E3125	13.49
After arresting a man (Fred Savage) accused of raping several neighborhood women, Detectives Benson and Stabler attempt to obtain an indictment for their suspect with the help of a key eyewitness - his last victim (Myndy Crist). However, the suspect's decision to handle his own defense casts some doubt over the trial's outcome as he proves to be a formidable opponent for ADA Cabot.
89	23	"Grief"	Constantine Makris	Adisa Iwa	May 2, 2003	E3116	13.97
A waitress is found dead outside of a bar. Her death is ruled a suicide because the victim's boss (Paul Leyden) continually raped her and drove her into depression. When the victim's father (Joe Morton) becomes too close to Stabler, the victim's father snaps and vows revenge against his daughter's rapist.
90	24	"Perfect"	Rick Wallace	Jonathan Greene & Robert F. Campbell	May 9, 2003	E3126	13.28
A murdered fourteen-year-old girl leads the detectives to a prominent physician (Gale Harold) who specialises in reproductive therapy. In order to fund his research into human cloning, he has set up shelters around New York for troubled teenage girls. When they discover a missing girl (Kimberly J. Brown) in one of them, the SVU learns that the shelters actually indoctrinate the girls into a cult with the purpose of impregnating them. The doctor's own children are sold to naive couples unable to conceive who think that their own DNA has been used to produce a cloned baby. With many subordinates taking the fall, Cabot is unable to prosecute the doctor until the missing girl's shelter leader (Barbara Barrie) comes forward with the truth.
91	25	"Soulless"	Chad Lowe	Dawn DeNoon & Lisa Marie Petersen	May 16, 2003	E3127	13.72
A rape victim, Chloe Dutton (Peyton List), is brought into the hospital one night with a bar stamp on her hand, and when Benson tries to interview her, she insists that she wasn't raped after all and that she was drunk. A short time later, the nurse announces that the rapist snatched Chloe from the hospital. Chloe is later found deceased and one of the suspects involved in her death (Logan Marshall-Green) turns out to be a sociopath with a history of murder.
