= Mick Betancourt =

American screenwriter

- Born: April 13, 1974 (age 50); Chicago, Illinois, U.S.
- Occupations: Screenwriter; producer; comedian; actor; director
- Years active: 2002–present

Mick Betancourt (born April 13, 1974) is an American screenwriter, producer, comedian, actor, and director who has written scripts for several television series on major networks, including Chicago Fire, The Mob Doctor, Chicago P.D., and Law & Order: Special Victims Unit.

Betancourt was born in Chicago, to a Puerto rican father, and Irish mother. He graduated from Fenwick High School in 1992 and currently lives in Los Angeles. He sold his first television series to CBS at age 30 and has since written on Breakout Kings, The Black Donnellys, and Detroit 187.

He directed his first short film in 2008, No Place Like Home, which was well received at independent film festivals. Betancourt has performed as a comedian at the Chicago and Montreal Comedy Festivals, and has performed stand-up on channels such as NBC, HBO, TBS, and Comedy Central. He was featured in Studs Terkel's book Death-Will the Circle Be Unbroken.
