= Kathy Dobie =

American journalist

Kathy Dobie is an American investigative journalist notable for her coverage of sexual assault. She has written for Harper's Magazine, GQ, The New York Times and Salon, among others. Her first book, The Only Girl in the Car, was published in 2004.

== Early life ==
Dobie was born and raised in Hamden, Connecticut. She is the third oldest of six children - two older brothers Michael and Bill, two younger sisters Cindy and Beth Ann, and a younger brother Stephen.

Her mother, Kay, was a homemaker, having married at 19 and having her first child, Michael, at 20. Kay was an only child, and her parents separated when she was only two, at which time her mother drove her from Oklahoma to Connecticut.

Her father, Albert, grew up in New Haven, Connecticut and worked at Yale University, where he ran the dining halls and food service.

Dobie and her siblings attended school at St. Rita School in Hamden, a Catholic parish elementary school. She completed one semester at New York University before being put on academic probation and dropping out.

== Writings ==
Dobie has worked for numerous publications, especially GQ. As of May 2016, her most recent published piece was "To Catch a Rapist," published on January 5, 2016 in The New York Times Magazine. She has also written for Harper's Magazine; The Village Voice; Vibe; Salon; and O, The Oprah Magazine.

=== Tiny Little Laws ===
"Tiny Little Laws" was published in the February 2011 issue of Harper's Magazine. The story investigated loopholes in the laws of Native American tribes in relation to federal law and the inability of tribal judicial systems to prosecute those who commit sexual assault.

Dobie traveled to the Standing Rock Indian Reservation, which straddles the border of North and South Dakota. Despite the Bureau of Indian Affairs forbidding local law enforcement from talking to Dobie, she interviewed local authorities as well as residents who were victims of sexual assault to discover that nearly everyone she spoke to was a victim of, or knew someone who was a victim of, such crimes.

"Tiny Little Laws" won the 2012 Deadline Club Award in Minority Focus. It was also a finalist in 2012 for the Michael Kelly Award and the National Magazine Award in public interest.

=== The Long Shadow of War ===
"The Long Shadow of War" was published in the December 2007 issue of GQ. It tells the story of Cecil Ison, a Vietnam War veteran who did not display symptoms of Posttraumatic Stress Disorder until after George W. Bush declared war in March 2003.

"The Long Shadow of War" was a finalist in 2009 for the National Magazine Award in feature writing.

=== Book ===
Dobie's first and only book, The Only Girl in the Car, is a memoir in which she explores her sexuality during her teenage years. She documents the day she lost her virginity after sitting on her front lawn in a candy-striped halter top, hip-hugger jeans and platform shoes and agreed to go to the movies that night with the first man who approached her - Brian, a man in his 30s.

When she was 15 she began seeing a boy, called "Jimmy" in the book, who was in a committed relationship with another girl, "Chrissy." However, almost every night Jimmy would pick up Kathy from her home, his car already full with his friends who were drinking and smoking. He would drop the friends off at the Teen Center where they spent their afternoons, and then he would take Kathy to an empty park.

A few months into the relationship, Kathy writes that instead of dropping his friends off, Jimmy drove the whole group to the park, forcing them to get out of the car while he had sex with Kathy. Then, Jimmy and his friends gang raped her.

She was ostracized by her peers at the Teen Center, who quickly heard of what transpired in the park that night. She knew her life would never be the same, so she turned to writing and embraced her life as a self-proclaimed loner.

The memoir ends with her documenting her life as it is currently - her row house in Brooklyn, her eclectic roommates and neighbors, and the boyfriend who lives across the Brooklyn Bridge - a distance she says she appreciates.

== Awards ==
- 2009: National Magazine Award finalist, feature writing
- 2012: National Magazine Award finalist, public interest
- 2012: Michael Kelly Award finalist
- 2012: Deadline Club Award winner, minority focus
