= Judith McCreary =

American television writer and producer

Judith McCreary is an American television writer and producer. She has worked on such shows as Law & Order: Special Victims Unit, New York Undercover,CSI: Crime Scene Investigation and Criminal Minds.
