= Martha Mitchell (director) =

American television director

- Occupation: Television director
- Years active: 1982–present

Martha Mitchell is an American television director.

She has directed for a number of notable television series. Prior to directing, Mitchell worked as a script supervisor on numerous films, the pilot episode of New York Undercover and episodes of Law & Order from 1990 to 1996.

She is a graduate of Barnard College.

== Selected filmography ==
- NCIS
- House, M.D.
- Without a Trace
- New York Undercover
- Prey
- Strange Luck
- Malibu Shores
- Close to Home
- Numb3rs
- Spy Game
- Judging Amy
- Law & Order
- Charmed
- Jericho
- Joan of Arcadia
- The Guardian
- Family Law
- Veronica Mars
- Timecop
- Promised Land
- The Division
- The Education of Max Bickford
- Haunted
- Now and Again
- The Practice
- Chicago Hope
- The Mentalist
- Mercy
- The Protector
- NYC 22
- Raising the Bar
- Unforgettable
- Blue Bloods
- The Fosters
- You
- The Enemy Within
- Blindspot
