= Jean de Segonzac =

American film director

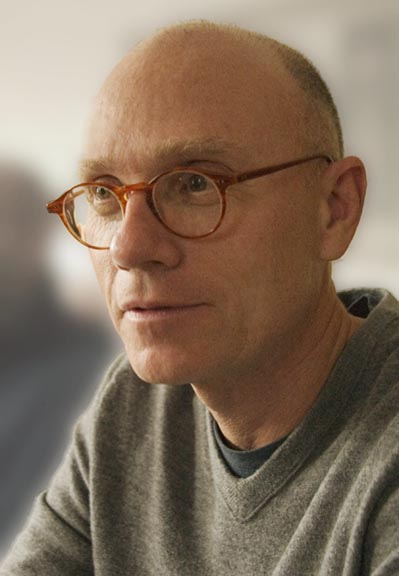
- Jean de Segonzac in 2006
- Other name: Jean DeSegonzac
- Occupations: Director, screenwriter, cinematographer
- Years active: 1985-present

Jean de Segonzac (sometimes credited as Jean DeSegonzac) is an American director, screenwriter and cinematographer who has worked in documentaries and television programs. Most of his work has been in gritty, cinéma vérité-style law enforcement TV dramas.

== Early life ==
Jean de Segonzac was born to Adalbert and Madeleine de Segonzac, the youngest of four children (his siblings include Lionel de Segonzac, Catherine Shainberg, and Laurence de Segonzac). His father (whose nickname was "Ziggy") was a French journalist who was the chief U.S. correspondent for France Soir in Washington, D.C., for two decades as well as a former president of the Foreign Press Association. Jean de Segonzac graduated from the Rhode Island School of Design in 1975.

== Career ==
His first known credit was as cinematographer on the documentary film Born on the Fourth of July in 1985. His second major work was Common Threads: Stories from the Quilt (1989), followed by Crack USA: County Under Siege, which was nominated for an Academy Award for Best Documentary Feature (his camera work was called "intrusive" by one reviewer). He next worked on the 1991 documentary Where Are We? Our Trip Through America (1992) which followed gay filmmakers Rob Epstein and Jeffrey Friedman as they went from small town to small town, interviewing local people. Newsday said, "The film owes much of its success to director of photography Jean De Segonzac, whose alert camera takes in such eccentric details as a copy of The New Sweden on the coffee table of a model mobile home and a kitten lapping water from a miniature kidney-shaped pool.

His breakthrough effort was Nick Gomez's independent feature film, Laws of Gravity (1992). One reviewer called his images for the film "exceptional cinema verite camera work", while another praised the cinematography as "jumpy, in-your-face". His cinematography for the film was a runner-up for the 1992 New York Film Critics Circle Awards. De Segonzac not only provided the cinematography, but also refused his $5,000 salary in order to help complete the film. A reviewer for The Washington Post said de Segonzac "fills the screen with beautifully framed scenes that need little verbal underpinning."

In 1994, de Segonzac was part of the team that won a Peabody Award for the documentary Road Scholar. The film follows Romanian-born poet, novelist and National Public Radio commentator Andrei Codrescu around the United States as he attempts to define what it means to be an American (as seen through the eyes of a naturalized citizen). The film was co-directed by Roger Weisberg and de Segonzac, with de Segonzac also providing the cinematography.

Since 1993, the majority of de Segonzac's work has been on television in law enforcement-themed dramas such as Homicide: Life on the Street, Oz, Brooklyn South, Law & Order, Law & Order: Special Victims Unit, and Law & Order: Criminal Intent. He also worked for Michael Moore's Emmy-winning TV Nation, and provided director and cinematographer duties for a number of made-for-television movies. With Barry Levinson, he is credited with having created the "loose, free-flowing visual style" of Homicide: Life on the Street "that built on the documentary-style affectations of Hill Street Blues." Critic Matt Zoller Seitz, writing for Salon.com, called it one of the 10 greatest television pilots of all time. In 2000, de Segonzac directed actress Adrienne Shelly in the Law & Order episode "High & Low". In 2003, he directed the movie Code 11–14, about a serial Killer on a Boeing 747SP from Sydney Australia to Los Angeles with David James Elliot and Nanci Chambers. Shelly was murdered on November 1, 2006. In February 2007, de Segonzac directed the Law & Order episode "Melting Pot", which was a thinly veiled version of the Shelly murder.

In 1996, de Segonzac's cinematography for John McNaughton's independent crime drama Normal Life (with Luke Perry and Ashley Judd) won him notice for his "hovering, purposefully untidy camerawork".

de Segonzac made his feature film directorial debut with Mimic 2 in 2001. He directed his second feature film, the low-budget science fiction thriller Lost City Raiders, in 2008 and in 2003 he directed the film Code 11–14 with David James Elliot, a Boeing 747SP from Sydney Australia to Los Angeles with a Serial Killer on board.

In 2011, de Segonzac was a co-director on the television series Lights Out on the FX cable network, and directed the seventh episode of the first season of the Kelsey Grammer 2011 television series Boss on the Starz cable network.

de Segonzac directed the very first episode of Law & Order: Special Victims Unit in 1999. In October 2012, he directed the series' 300th episode as well.
