= 1931 Philadelphia mayoral election =

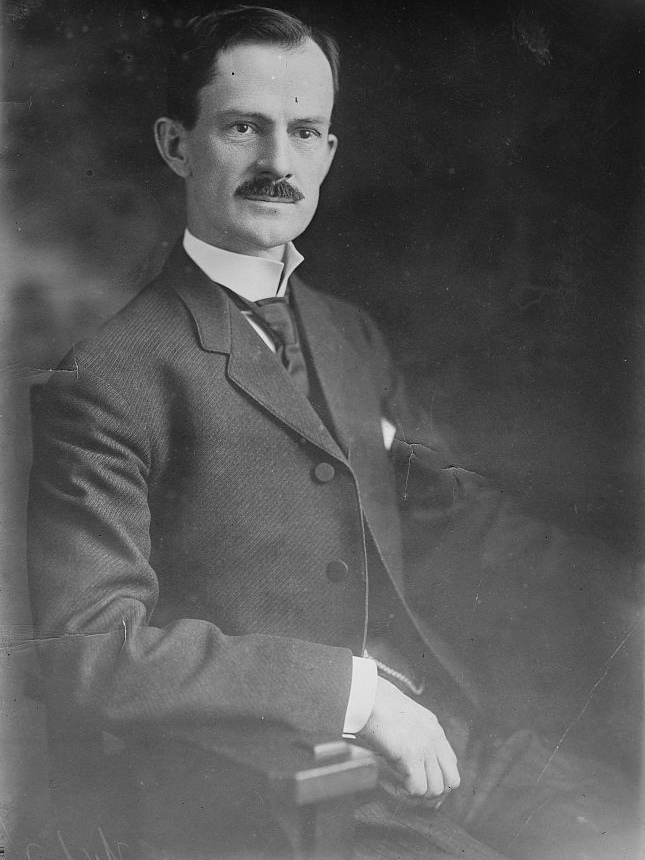

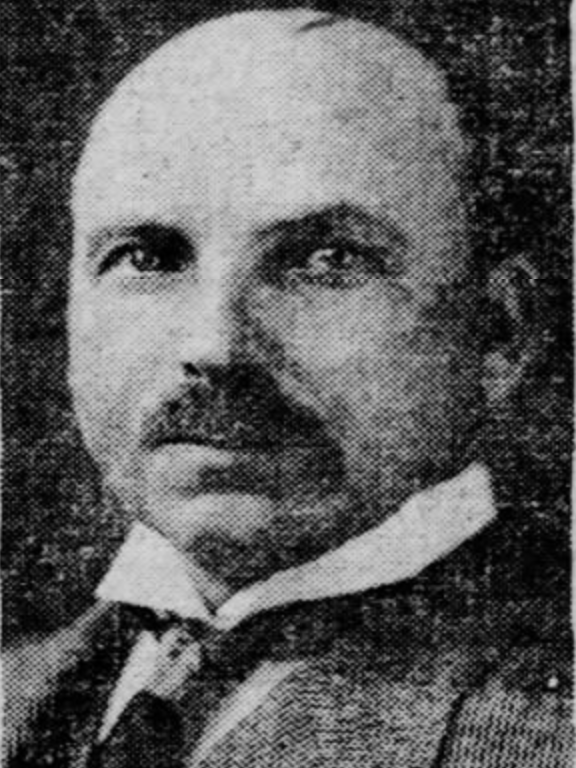
| Nominee | J. Hampton Moore | Michael Donohoe |
| Party | Republican | Democratic |
| Popular vote | 362,329 | 31,330 |
| Percentage | 92.04% | 7.96% |
Mayor before election
Harry Arista Mackey
Republican
Elected mayor
J. Hampton Moore
Republican

The 1931 Philadelphia mayoral election saw the return of J. Hampton Moore to the mayors office.

== Results ==
1931 Philadelphia mayoral election (general election)
| Party | Candidate | Votes | % |
|---|---|---|---|
| Republican | J. Hampton Moore | 362,329 | 92.04% |
| Democratic | Michael Donohoe | 31,330 | 7.96% |
| Turnout | | 393,659 | |
