= It's Me, Matthew! =

2008 film by Neil Stephens

- Directed by: Neil Stephens
- Written by: Michael McDerman
- Produced by: Michael McDerman (executive producer); Louise Devery (associate producer); Antonia Kasper (associate producer)
- Starring: Michael McDerman; Paul Anthony Stewart; Michael Musto; Eric Wilke
- Cinematography: Michael LaVoie
- Edited by: Patrick Flynn
- Music by: Lisa Dotolo
- Release date: August 16, 2008 (North Carolina Gay & Lesbian Film Festival)
- Running time: 15 minutes
- Country: United States
- Language: English

It's Me, Matthew! is a 2008 American short film based on actual events. The semi-autobiographical short film was written, produced, and starred Michael McDerman, who used the stage name Michael Ferreira in this film. It was directed by Neil Stephens. The film running 15 minutes centered on the title character of Matthew, who is confronted with the inner struggle of looking at the past to understand why he's drawn into the personal relationships he's had. His psychoanalyst helps him link the pieces of the puzzle from the present time to the past. The film was screened at North Carolina Gay & Lesbian Film Festival, Rhode Island International Film Festival, Long Island Gay and Lesbian Film Festival, Anthology Film Archives, The Fortress of the Arts Festival of Shorts, Think Short Film Festival, West Hollywood International Film Festival, where it won a Juror Award, and it opened before the gay cinema's gay movie night at Clearview Cinemas, in New York City hosted by Hedda Lettuce.

== Plot ==
The notion of the film is that our adult lives run in cycles of unconscious behavior. Matthew (played both by Eric Wilke and Michael McDerman), confronts the past through Sigmund Freud's theory of psychotherapy. His therapist (Michael Musto) helps Matthew find parallels to the past to resolve childhood trauma.

== Cast ==
=== Main ===
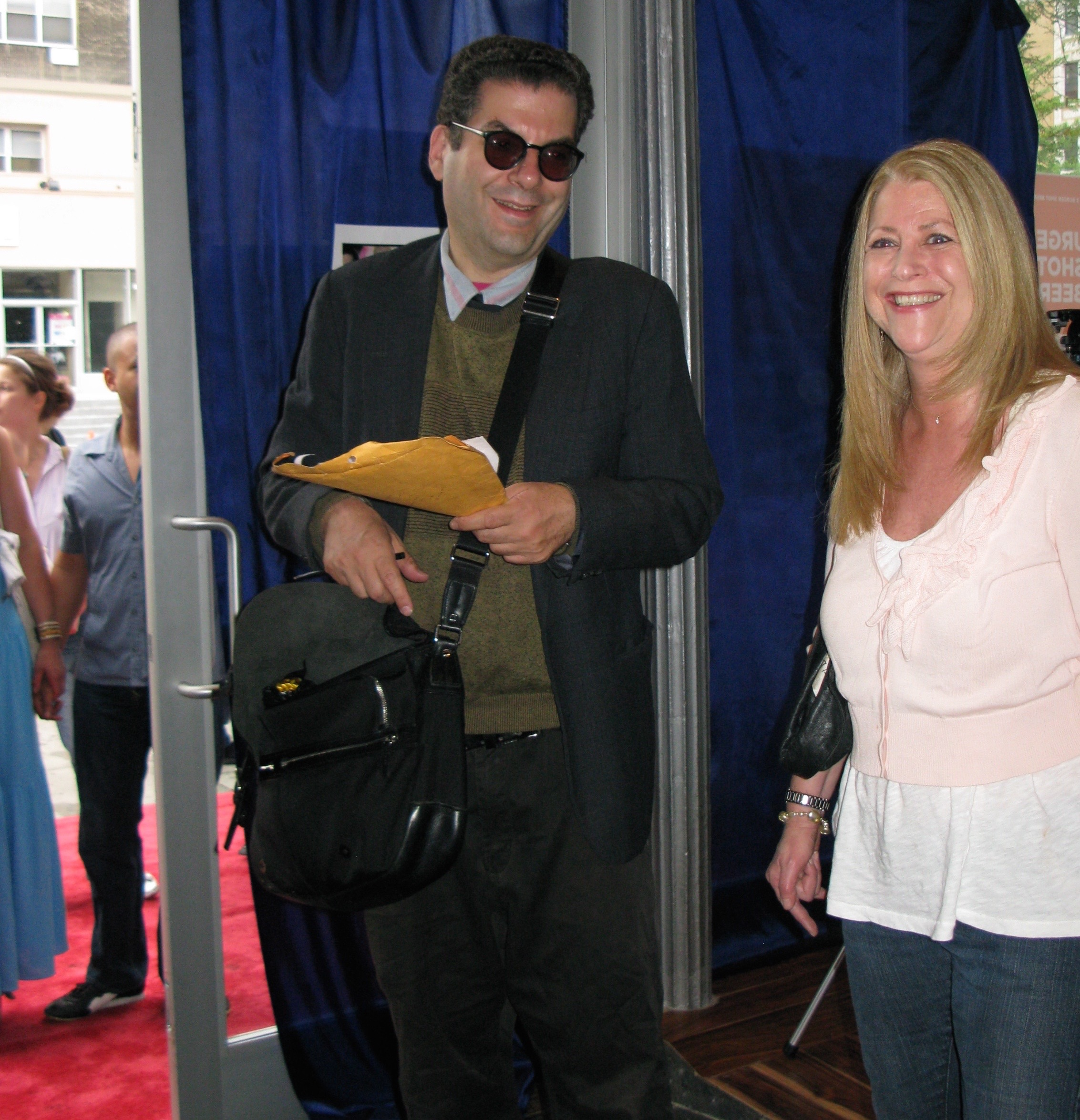
Michael Musto in 2008 at screening event for It's Me, Matthew!

- Michael McDerman as Matthew / Ms. Cann (as Michael Ferreira)
- Paul Anthony Stewart as Brice
- Michael Musto as Therapist
- Eric Wilke as Matthew, as a youth
- Melisanne Russo as Maria (as Melissa Russo)
- Monique Crous as Roommate
- Kelsey O'Brien as Stage Manager (as Kelsey Ruvolo)
- Thomas M. Harlan as Doctor

== Release ==
The film had a platform release private screening event in New York City in June 2008. The film was released at the North Carolina Gay & Lesbian Film Festival on August 16, 2008.

== Critical reception ==
Cliff Bellamy, writing for The Herald-Sun, noted Ferreira's skillful use of the flashback technique.

Brandon Voss, writing for HX Magazine (New York City, New York), June 20, 2008 page 18. "A wonderful film everyone should watch".

Mano, Henrique. MICHAEL FERREIRA TEMS ORIGENS EM MANGUALDE - Luso-americano que faz carreira como actor aventura-se agora an realização - É semi-autobiográfica a primeira curta-metragem que assina como realizador de cinema (MICHAEL FERREIRA HAVE CHANGES IN MANGUALDE - Luso-American who is acting career adventure is now an achievement - is semi-autobiographical short film first signing as film director). Luso-Americano (USA) 27 June 2008, Iss. 3515, pp. 1, 11. Retrieved 2016-01-19.

John Polly, Next Magazine (New York City), June 13, 2008 page 7. " The premier party was a huge success and all the film's stars greeted their new fans".

== Soundtrack ==
Lisa Dotolo, Singer / Songwriter Michael's Song Bella Mere Records (2008)
