= 1935 Philadelphia mayoral election =

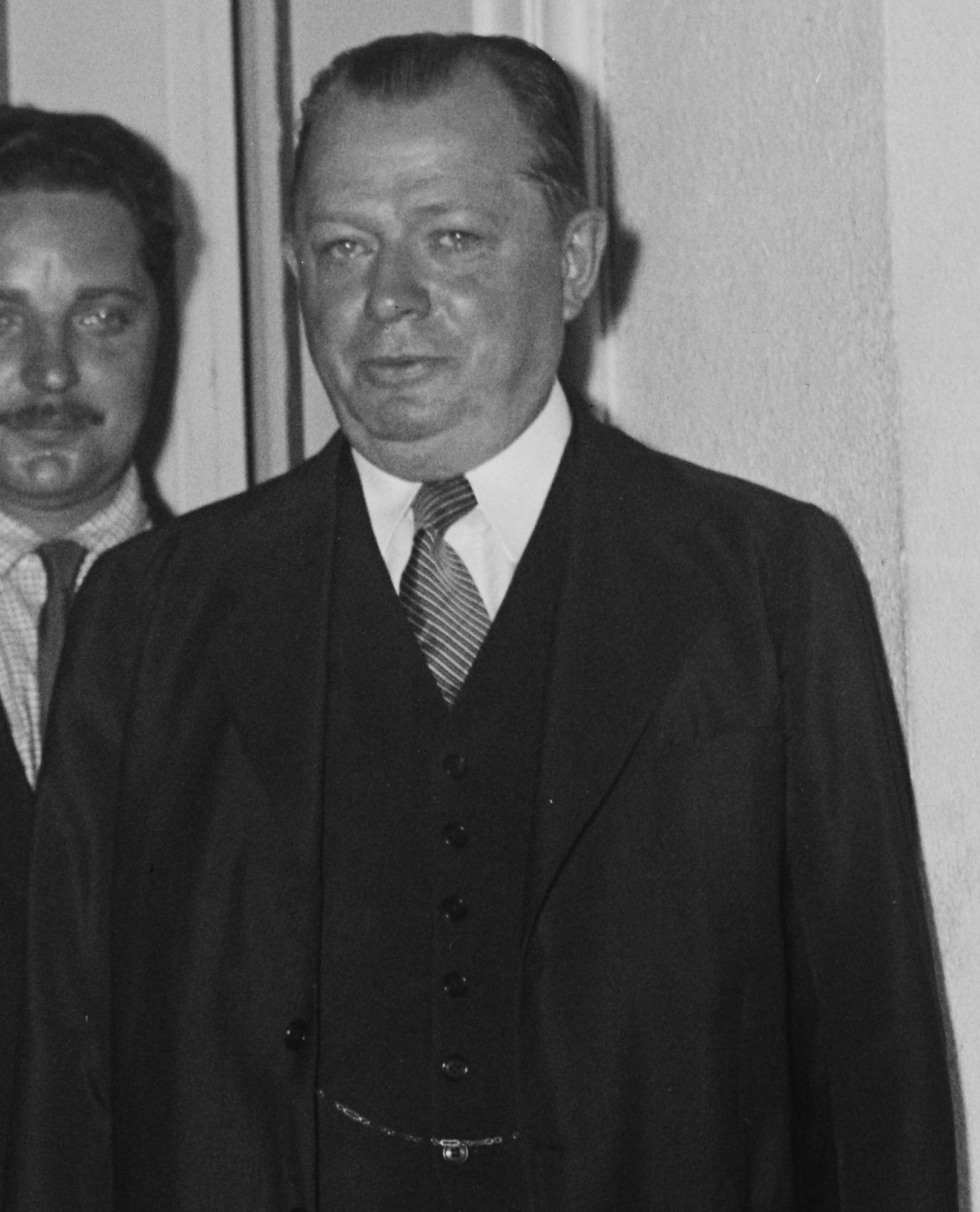

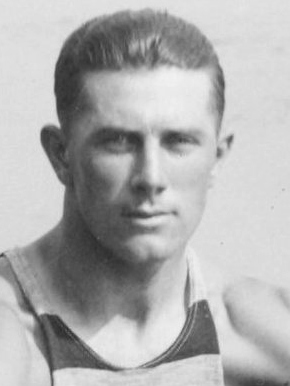
Nominee	Samuel Davis Wilson	Jack Kelly
Party	Republican	Democratic
Popular vote	379,222	333,825
Percentage	53.18%	46.82%
Mayor before election
J. Hampton Moore
Republican
Elected mayor
Samuel Davis Wilson
Republican

The 1935 Philadelphia mayoral election was the election of Samuel Davis Wilson.

== Background ==
From the Civil War, Philadelphia politics had been dominated by a Republican Party political machine. However, the machine's power waned in the 1920s and 1930s, following a series of corruption investigations and the Great Depression, which destroyed the popularity of the Republican Party nationwide and in urban centers in particular.

== General election ==
=== Candidates ===
- Jack Kelly, construction magnate and former Olympic rower (Democratic)
- Samuel Davis Wilson, Philadelphia city controller (Republican)

=== Campaign ===
Wilson was a strong candidate. He had strong persuasive abilities, being able to take opposing positions on a topic while still seeming sincere. For instance, Wilson, as a mayoral candidate, condemned "out of control" federal spending. However, once elected mayor, in 1936 he would later assist in guaranteeing that 40,000 of his constituents were on the Works Progress Administration payroll.

Wilson was not completely loyal to the national Republican Party, as he had previously campaigned for Franklin Roosevelt in 1932.

Wilson was prone to taking a bare-knuckle approach to political discourse, not straying from referring to his opponents by pejoratives as “dirty rats” and “bare-faced liars.”

Having registered 179,000 new voters after the 1932 election cycle, Philadelphia Democrats hoped to finally take the mayoralty. Democrats believed they had recruited the ideal candidate with millionaire contractor and gold medal Olympian Jack Kelly. Kelly was an opponent of discrimination. He had, himself, been blocked from joining the upper echelons of Philadelphia Protestant society. Kelly reached out to Italians, Jews, and African Americans. He also made an effort to slightly diversify the down-ballot positions on the Democratic Party's ticket.

=== Results ===
The race proved to be the narrowest mayoral election that Philadelphia had seen in a long time.

Despite Kelly's efforts, 56% of black voters and half of Philadelphia's ethnic Italian electorate supported Wilson.

1935 Philadelphia mayoral election (general election)
Party	Candidate	Votes	%
Republican	Samuel Davis Wilson	379,222	53.18%
Democratic	Jack Kelly	333,825	46.82%
Turnout		713,047	
