= 1939 Philadelphia mayoral election =

Nominee	Robert Eneas Lamberton	Robert C. White
Party	Republican	Democratic
Popular vote	398,384	361,143
Percentage	52.45%	47.55%
Mayor before election
George Connell
Republican
Elected mayor
Robert Eneas Lamberton
Republican

The 1939 Philadelphia mayoral election saw the election of Robert Eneas Lamberton.

== Results ==
1939 Philadelphia mayoral election (general election)
Party	Candidate	Votes	%
Republican	Robert Eneas Lamberton	398,384	52.45%
Democratic	Robert C. White	361,143	47.55%
Turnout		759,527	
