= Law & Order: Special Victims Unit season 5 =

Season of American television series

Law & Order: Special Victims Unit
- Season 5
- Season 5 U.S. DVD cover
- Starring: Christopher Meloni; Mariska Hargitay; Richard Belzer; Stephanie March; Ice-T; BD Wong; Dann Florek; Diane Neal
- No. of episodes: 25

Release
- Original network: NBC
- Original release: September 23, 2003 – May 18, 2004

Season chronology
- ← Previous; Season 4 Next → Season 6

The fifth season of the television series, Law & Order: Special Victims Unit premiered September 23, 2003, and ended May 18, 2004, on NBC. Law & Order: SVU moved away from its Friday night slot to Tuesday nights at 10pm/9c. Casey Novak, the unit's longest-serving ADA, was introduced in the fifth episode when Diane Neal joined the cast to fill the absence left by Stephanie March.

== Production ==
Early reports about Stephanie March leaving the cast at the end of Season 4 indicate that the first Season 5 episodes were written if not filmed by May 2003.

The sixth episode, "Coerced", shows Elliot Stabler and George Huang at odds with each other about how to get through to a schizophrenic man. Jonathan Greene, who wrote the episode, said that Neal Baer has "instilled in all of us this fascination with how the mind works, and the nexus of where the mind and the law cross."

During a 2012 interview for the show Media Mayhem, Neal Baer revealed that the most controversial episode of his career came from the fifth season. About the episode "Home", he said "I never ever dreamed that I would get so much hate mail" and explained "children who go to private or public schools are seen by lots of people and that's a safety net."

The nineteenth episode, "Sick", was loosely based on the allegations of child abuse against Michael Jackson. Writer Dawn DeNoon penned the episode based on her dislike of the Jackson verdict, saying, "Justice wasn't done in the real arena, so I kept closer to the true story in this one than in most of them." In the real-life case to which DeNoon refers, the evidence that was not introduced in the 2005 trial was introduced in the two 1994 grand jury hearings after the civil settlement for the civil case. Both grand juries disbanded after several weeks and did not indict Jackson, claiming the evidence did not match the accuser's description and citing lack of other evidence.

During the filming of the fifth season, SVU still did not have its own courtroom set. A 2011 video with Diane Neal reveals that the directors were still using the Law & Order courtroom. She reminisced "my memories of this set are of waking up at the ass-crack of dawn on a Saturday when they weren't using it and shooting courtroom for twenty-two hours."

== Cast changes and returning characters ==
Stephanie March (ADA Alexandra Cabot) departed the cast after the fourth episode, her character "killed" and placed into the witness protection program. The last-minute twist of having her character survive was confirmed as a way of letting her character make further appearances. Christopher Meloni joked that "Dick Wolf always has an aversion to whacking his own people. He gives them a door, not a bullet. Unlike The Sopranos, where you're lucky if you leave with your head on."

Diane Neal (who previously guest-starred in the 10th episode of Season 3, "Ridicule", as a female rapist) joined the cast afterward as Casey Novak, a more hands-on and by-the-book ADA than Alex Cabot. In an email interview, Neal wrote "I had no idea whether or not I'd performed well in the audition, but I was lucky enough to get the part." When describing her character, Neal said, "I always walked like I was uncomfortable in heels, therefore so did Novak."

Mike Doyle began portraying CSU forensics technician Ryan O'Halloran with the episode "Choice", a recurring character he portrayed for the next five seasons. Even though a backstory for O'Halloran was not firmly established during the fifth season, Doyle stated that "they used to write for O'Halloran as if he were from the Midwest."

Additionally, Judge Joseph Terhune was introduced, played by Philip Bosco, who guest-starred as a Parkinson's patient in the previous season. The episode "Bound" reveals that his character likes to host poker games and features a scene in which most of the judge characters in SVU are seated at the poker table.

== Cast ==
=== Main ===
- Christopher Meloni as Senior Detective Elliot Stabler
- Mariska Hargitay as Junior Detective Olivia Benson
- Richard Belzer as Senior Detective John Munch
- Stephanie March as Assistant District Attorney Alexandra Cabot (episodes 1–4)
- Ice-T as Junior Detective Odafin "Fin" Tutuola
- BD Wong as FBI Special Agent Dr. George Huang
- Dann Florek as Captain Donald "Don" Cragen
- Diane Neal as Assistant District Attorney Casey Novak (episodes 5–25)

=== Crossover stars from Law & Order ===
- Fred Dalton Thompson as District Attorney Arthur Branch

=== Recurring ===
- Harvey Atkin as Judge Alan Ridenour
- Ian Bedford as Officer Bamford
- Michael Boatman as Defense Attorney Dave Seaver
- Philip Bosco as Judge Joseph Terhune
- Barry Bostwick as Defense Attorney Oliver Gates
- Caren Browning as Crime Scene Unit Captain Judith Siper
- John Cullum as Defense Attorney Barry Moredock
- Beverly D'Angelo as Defense Attorney Rebecca Balthus
- Mike Doyle as Crime Scene Unit Forensics Technician Ryan O'Halloran
- Ned Eisenberg as Defense Attorney Roger Kressler
- Linda Emond as Dr. Emily Sopher
- Joel de la Fuente as Technical Assistance Response Unit Technician Ruben Morales
- Donnetta Lavinia Grays as Officer Ramirez
- Stephen Gregory as Dr. Kyle Beresford
- Peter Hermann as Defense Attorney Trevor Langan
- Jill Marie Lawrence as Defense Attorney Cleo Conrad
- Peter McRobbie as Judge Walter Bradley
- Joanna Merlin as Judge Lena Petrovsky
- Audrie J. Neenan as Judge Lois Preston
- Tom O'Rourke as Judge Mark Seligman
- Joselin Reyes as Paramedic Martinez
- Peter Riegert as Defense Attorney Chauncey Zeirko
- Triney Sandoval as Technical Assistance Response Unit Technician Echevarria
- Daniel Sunjata as Crime Scene Unit Forensics Technician Burt Trevor
- Marlo Thomas as Judge Mary Clark
- Callie Thorne as Defense Attorney Nikki Staines
- David Thornton as Defense Attorney Lionel Granger
- Jim Titus as Officer Marvin Bryson
- Sheila Tousey as Judge Danielle Larsen
- Tamara Tunie as Medical Examiner Dr. Melinda Warner
- Sullivan Walker as Martin Bosa
- Julia White as Dr. Anne Morella
- William Whitehead as Judge Philip Wyler
- Pilar Witherspoon as Julia Hynton
- Charlayne Woodard as Sister Peg
- Craig Wroe as Defense Attorney James Woodrow

=== Guest stars ===
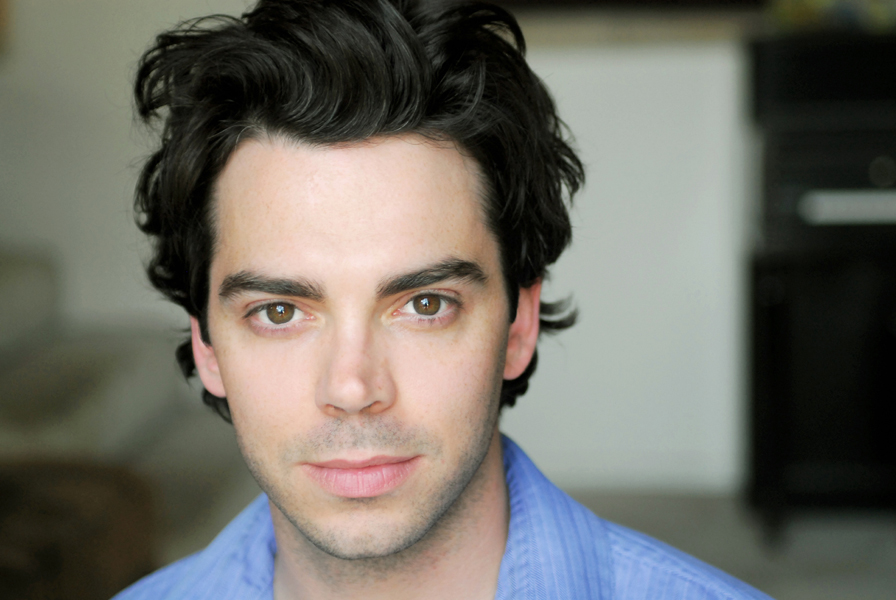
Will Keenan played Billy Tripley, a fictionalized version of Michael Jackson. The name Billy was a reference to "Billie Jean" in Jackson's hit song.

The season opener "Tragedy" featured Shirley Knight who also starred in the premiere of the third season. Her character was Rose Granville, a wealthy mother determined to harm anyone who stands in her daughter's way of success. Mare Winningham was one of two fifth season nominees for the Primetime Emmy Award for Outstanding Guest Actress in a Drama Series. She played the mother of a hyperactive boy who takes the wrong medication and commits a heinous crime as a result. The second was Marlee Matlin for the nineteenth episode "Painless" in which she played assisted suicide advocate Dr. Amy Solwey. Her character shares an emotional scene with Detective Munch during which it is revealed that Munch's father killed himself. This is also true of Richard Belzer's father. Matlin commented that "I remember Richard having a hard time with it at first. I figured there must have been some personal connection there and I believe he told me afterwards."

The episode "Coerced" is about a schizophrenic man trying to reach out to his son. Leland Orser played the father and Spencer List played the son. In a 2012 Twitter interview, List wrote "I became an actor when I was 5 I did a [Law & Order: SVU] and I knew from then on I wanted to do this for the rest of my life." The episode "Choice" sought to raise awareness about fetal alcohol syndrome. Josie Bissett (whose husband Rob Estes appeared in the previous season) played the role of an irresponsible mother. Kathrine Roberts played her daughter and was chosen because she has FAS in real life.

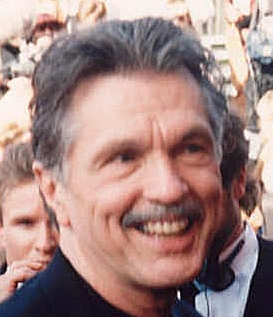
Tom Skerritt played an arrogant judge in "Poison". His character's attitude has been compared to those of three judges in a 2010 hate speech case.

In the episode "Abomination", George Segal portrayed a father in denial about the fact that his son is gay. The accuracy of this episode garnered approval from critics of the ex-gay movement. In the 100th episode "Control", Mariska Hargitay's father, Mickey Hargitay guest starred as a man on a subway station escalator who witnesses the aftermath of a brutal assault. This was Mickey Hargitay's final acting role before his death in September 2006. Cynthia Ettinger guest starred in "Shaken" as a mother whose daughter falls into a coma because of a bad decision she made. Christopher Meloni and Dann Florek were both moved by the episode with Florek saying "it was some of the most emotional stuff Chris has done."

In "Home", Diane Venora portrayed an abusive mother who uses homeschooling as a way of keeping her children from the eyes of the public. When discussing her role, Neal Baer said "She played it, I mean she was ferocious." The episode "Lowdown" guest starred Michael Beach as a black man who infects his wife with AIDS. His character participates in the down low phenomenon of living a double life as a homosexual. After explaining to the squad what that means, Detective Tutuola adds "Don't look at me, I just know stuff." This line was written by Ice-T because, in his words, "at the end of the day, I'm like, 'How do I know so much damn information about this?'" Michael Beach previously played an AIDS patient in ER who was intended to have been on the down low. However, this detail was cut from the episode. "Lowdown" has been referenced in news articles about homophobia in the black community.

In the twenty-first episode "Criminal" James McDaniel portrayed Javier Vega, an ex-convict who has a history with Captain Cragen. Coincidentally, a character played by McDaniel appeared with Cragen in the "Mushrooms" episode of the original Law & Order. Even though he did not play Vega, Florek has stated that this is one of his favourite episodes. The season finale "Head" starred Stacy Edwards as a school principal who becomes pregnant with the child of her student portrayed by Jake Weary. Matt Loguercio, who played a teacher in the episode wrote at length about how he had been auditioning for all three Law & Order when he got the call to appear. He stayed up to date on auditions by taking a classes taught by Jonathan Strauss and Jennifer Jones. Jones was the assistant casting director for SVU at the time and Strauss became the casting director after Julie Tucker departed.

== Episodes ==
Law & Order: Special Victims Unit season 5 episodes
No. overall	No. in season	Title	Directed by	Written by	Original release date	Prod. code	U.S. viewers (millions)
92	1	"Tragedy"	David Platt	Amanda Green	September 23, 2003	E4403	13.23
A high-risk pregnant woman named Annika Bergeron (Karen Goberman) is kidnapped when approaching her due date. Multiple suspects are revealed when they learn that the father Daniel Lester (Gabriel Olds) is seeing a new girlfriend Melinda Granville (Kellie Martin) and that her mother Rose Granville (Shirley Knight) is determined to make sure the relationship lasts.
93	2	"Manic"	Guy Norman Bee	Patrick Harbinson	September 30, 2003	E4401	11.48
Detectives Benson and Stabler learn that an alleged victim (Rory Culkin) of a school shooting that claimed two lives, was in fact the perpetrator. After learning about the boy's psychiatric problems from his mother (Mare Winningham), the squad realizes that a major pharmaceutical company is also responsible.: Special appearance by Fred Thompson as DA Arthur Branch.
94	3	"Mother"	Ted Kotcheff	Lisa Marie Petersen & Dawn DeNoon	October 7, 2003	E4404	9.94
A psychiatrist (Susanna Thompson) is almost fatally attacked – possibly by her patient, but she refuses to reveal information due to doctor-patient confidentiality. Two patients become suspects. One is a recently released serial rapist who is later cleared. The other is a college student (Jon Abrahams) who suffers from fugue states. His hyper-concerned sister (Sherri Parker Lee) gives clues to his traumatized emotional state. Eventually, Detectives Benson and Stabler find a link between the attack, childhood abuse, and an unsolved fire.
95	4	"Loss"	Constantine Makris	Michele Fazekas & Tara Butters	October 14, 2003	E4402	12.65
Alex Cabot gets in over her head while prosecuting the rape and murder of an undercover federal agent. With the help of a confidential informant (Josh Hopkins), the detectives learn that the killer is Rafael Zapata Gaviria (Jacinto Taras Riddick), a powerful drug dealer working for the notorious international drug lord, Cesar Velez. When she refuses to back down, the cartel threatens to kill Cabot and her family, driving her into witness protection.: Special appearance by Fred Thompson as DA Arthur Branch.
96	5	"Serendipity"	Constantine Makris	Dawn DeNoon & Lisa Marie Petersen	October 21, 2003	E4408	11.87
A male dermatologist (Martin Donovan) is suspected of murdering a baby and her mother. When he agrees to a paternity test, the detectives are surprised to learn that it matches the DNA of a serial child molester who applied honey to his penis. Detectives Benson and Stabler soon find out about a victim (Jolie Peters) who remembers the abuse. The new ADA, Casey Novak, has difficulty accepting the nature of the crime and asks to be reassigned.: Special appearance by Fred Thompson as DA Arthur Branch.
97	6	"Coerced"	Jean de Segonzac	Jonathan Greene	October 28, 2003	E4409	12.18
A homeless and schizophrenic man (Leland Orser), desperate to see his son (Spencer List), kidnaps a different boy (Dylan Bluestone) from his bed at night. After being attacked by the man, Detective Stabler begins to contemplate the factors that caused him to snap. This investigation exposes further crimes at an adult group home.
98	7	"Choice"	David Platt	Patrick Harbinson	November 4, 2003	E4411	13.08
A man (Rick Aiello) is arrested for attacking his pregnant wife (Josie Bissett) in protest of her drinking during pregnancy. Detective Benson finds out that she also overindulged in alcohol while pregnant with an earlier child (Kathrine Roberts). The wife is taken to family court by her husband, who accuses her of endangering the fetus by putting it at risk of developing fetal alcohol syndrome.
99	8	"Abomination"	Alex Zakrzewski	Michele Fazekas & Tara Butters	November 11, 2003	E4410	12.99
The homosexual poster-boy of a sexual re-education group is found murdered. After a local fundamentalist is cleared, the detectives turn their attention to the victim's thesis about the failure of sexual re-education groups. An opposing professor (George Segal) is found who has a dysfunctional relationship with his son (Jonathan Tucker).: Special appearance by Fred Thompson as DA Arthur Branch.
100	9	"Control"	Ted Kotcheff	Story by : Dick Wolf; Teleplay by : Neal Baer	November 18, 2003	E4413	13.94
Detectives Benson and Stabler question a witness (Mickey Hargitay) who saw a mutilated man (Austin Pendleton) stumbling through a subway station. The victim soon becomes a suspect when they learn that he used to abduct women, make them his "brides" and force them to live in his dungeon. However, before the man can be arrested, the mother (Jacqueline Bisset) of one of his former victims (Samantha Mathis) manages to kill him. The victim claims to have reported the crime four years earlier and took the law into her own hands because Detective Benson did not believe her.
101	10	"Shaken"	Constantine Makris	Amanda Green	November 25, 2003	E4414	13.14
When a missing child is found showing signs of brain damage, Detective Stabler and Captain Cragen suspect that she was beaten by a pedophile. However, they soon learn the victim suffered from shaken baby syndrome, which leads them to suspect the mother (Cynthia Ettinger), the nannies (Olga Merediz and Nicole Leach), and the mother's boyfriend (Richard Shoberg). When the child later lapses into a coma, Detective Stabler begs the mother to put aside any fears of the charges she may face and do the right thing.: Special appearance by Fred Thompson as DA Arthur Branch.
102	11	"Escape"	Jean de Segonzac	Barbie Kligman	December 2, 2003	E4415	13.65
When a convicted sex offender (Stephen Lang), along with another inmate (Michael K. Williams), breaks out from a Virginia prison, the detectives fear that he is heading for New York City to seek out his former victim (Milo Ventimiglia). Olivia teams up with a Deputy Marshal (Craig Bierko) from her past to find out the real reason for the convict's visit.
103	12	"Brotherhood"	Jean de Segonzac	José Molina	January 6, 2004	E4412	15.36
A local fraternity pledge master (Michael McDerman) is sodomized and murdered. The detectives link the crime to a pornographic website that features college girls at a local bar. The detectives discover that one of the fraternity brothers was ostracized and allegedly raped and uncover more grisly details of the various hazing rituals. A conflict of interest presents itself in court when the sadistic ring leader (Toby Moore) is represented by the father (Gary Cole) of the deceased. The investigation also hits another hurdle as the brothers refuse to talk.
104	13	"Hate"	David Platt	Robert Nathan	January 13, 2004	E4416	14.09
The team find themselves threading on a thin line when a man (Reynaldo Rosales) murders two Arabs (plus a third while in custody) and claims his genes and biology enforced the hatred and violence in him. However, Detectives Benson and Stabler discover a different reason for his Islamophobia and are determined to discredit his claims of genetic predisposition to violence.
105	14	"Ritual"	Ed Bianchi	Ruth Fletcher Gage & Christos N. Gage	February 3, 2004	E4406	13.81
A young boy is killed in a ritualistic manner which Fin identifies as that of Santería and the detectives question the leader (Barry Shabaka Henley) of a local chapter. Their attention turns elsewhere, however when they learn that the victim was one of many slave children smuggled from Nigeria.
106	15	"Families"	Constantine Makris	Jonathan Greene	February 10, 2004	E4419	12.89
When a pregnant teenager (Jenna Gavigan) is murdered, detectives learn that she was involved with a boyfriend (Patrick Flueger) whom his parents (Tom Mason and Jane Seymour) forbade her from seeing. When the squad investigates the boyfriend's parents, the victim's mother (Helen Slater), and younger brother (Spencer Treat Clark), they learn about a deep family secret.
107	16	"Home"	Rick Wallace	Amanda Green	February 17, 2004	E4420	14.37
A young boy (Jesse Schwartz) found digging through garbage cans leads to a paranoid, overprotective mother (Diane Venora). The case takes a twist when the boy is later found dead and his older brother (Joseph Cross) confesses to shooting him.
108	17	"Mean"	Constantine Makris	Michele Fazekas & Tara Butters	February 24, 2004	E4421	14.42
A sociopathic bully (Kelli Garner) in a private high school tortures and murders her own friend. Her other two closest friends (Arielle Kebbel and Kimberly McConnell) appear to protect her throughout the investigation. However, the detectives learn that they are also accessories to the murder who are protecting themselves. Olivia identifies with an overweight girl (Lindsay Hollister) who has been bullied by the four girls for years.: Based on the murder of Shanda Sharer.
109	18	"Careless"	Steve Shill	Patrick Harbinson	March 2, 2004	E4422	12.45
When a young boy (Steven G. Smith II) dies due to a religious ritual gone awry, Fin and Munch unravel a mysterious pattern of violence, abuse and murder within one foster care family (Cress Williams and Malinda Williams). The social worker (Julie Hagerty) faces charges for failing to protect the child, even though it is really the overcrowded system that failed both of them.
110	19	"Sick"	David Platt	Dawn DeNoon	March 30, 2004	E4423	15.55
A rewarding non-disclosure agreement causes two parents (James Colby and Jennifer Van Dyck) to refuse to have their child (Shane Haboucha) questioned about a suspected child molester (Will Keenan). It is also revealed that in hopes of getting millions worth of settlement, a grandmother (Cindy Williams) decides to seek out the same man and falsely accuse him of similar crimes against her granddaughter (Madeleine Martin), using clips she found in the paper.: Based upon the Michael Jackson sex abuse allegations.
111	20	"Lowdown"	Jud Taylor	Robert Nathan	April 6, 2004	E4424	12.49
A prosecutor (Dean Strange) is found dead with HIV in his system. Suspicion points to another attorney (Michael Beach) who was secretly in a sexual relationship with his co-worker. Casey Novak puts her job on the line and involves the suspect's wife (Bethany Butler) to get a confession.
112	21	"Criminal"	Alex Zakrzewski	José Molina	April 20, 2004	E4425	12.83
A criminology professor (James McDaniel), who served a sentence for killing a woman when he was 19, is among the suspects in a graduate student's rape and murder. His daughter (Zoe Saldaña) says he is a good man, but Captain Cragen, the arresting officer in the original crime, refuses to believe that he has been rehabilitated. After a false conviction, the SVU realizes that the real perpetrator is another student (Joe Towne) who killed out of jealousy.
113	22	"Painless"	Juan J. Campanella	Jonathan Greene	April 27, 2004	E4426	12.78
A defense lawyer (John Cullum) challenges the assisted-suicide law in a case involving a hearing-impaired embryologist (Marlee Matlin), whose website encouraged a woman (Karen Young) to kill herself. The suicide survivor claims she was raped, and later commits suicide by medicine. Munch takes a particular interest to the case, which is revealed to be for personal reasons.
114	23	"Bound"	Constantine Makris	Barbie Kligman	May 4, 2004	E4427	13.04
An elderly woman's strangulation leads to a case involving mass murders in a home-nursing company owned by Dr. Matt Spevak (Anthony Rapp) and run by his sister, Emma Spevak (Jane Krakowski). While Stabler is dead set on proving that Dr. Spevak is responsible for the murders and is convinced without a doubt he did it for the money, the rest of the squad aren't so sure, leading to Benson and Stabler discovering that the killer's true identity is the one they least suspected.
115	24	"Poison"	David Platt	Michele Fazekas & Tara Butters	May 11, 2004	E4428	12.28
A four-year-old girl passes out and is hospitalized after having a huge amount of detergent in her stomach. Her seven-year-old sister (Sloane Momsen) reveals that their mother (Cynthia Gibb) forced the child to drink it, but a judge (Tom Skerritt) disqualifies the sister's testimony. Novak and Clark (Marlo Thomas) investigate the judge due to his prior mishandling of an earlier child abuse case, in which he falsely jailed a woman (Lecy Goranson).
116	25	"Head"	Juan J. Campanella	Lisa Marie Petersen & Dawn DeNoon	May 18, 2004	E4418	18.36
A man (James Urbaniak) is investigated for hiding a video camera in a public restroom for sexual pleasure. To escape trial, he reveals an incriminating clip. In the clip, a middle school female principal (Stacy Edwards) commits statutory rape with her male student (Jake Weary) in a public restroom.: Inspired by a real story about a sex offender male teacher in Virginia, who had an egg-sized tumor in the right lobe of the orbifrontal cortex. Once it was removed, he stopped his harassments. Once it grew back, he became a sex offender until it was removed again.
