= Robert E. Lamberton High School =

Defunct high school in Pennsylvania, United States

Coordinates: 39.9757°N 75.2662°W

Robert E. Lamberton High School was an American high school located in the Overbrook Park section of Philadelphia. It shared a building with the Robert E. Lamberton Elementary School, which serves grades K-8. The high school was closed in 2013 as part of Philadelphia's shutdown of 23 district-run schools. Displaced students were enrolled in Overbrook High School. The elementary school continues to operate, and now occupies the whole building.

The school was named for Robert Eneas Lamberton, who served as Mayor of Philadelphia from 1940 to 1941. Lamberton HS had 350 students. The majority of students were African-American, while 2 percent were Caucasian or other ethnic groups in its last year. When it was opened for primarily Caucasian high school students in 1974, the students met in classrooms made available in a local church and synagogue.

== Academics ==
Lamberton had the academic programs that the Commonwealth of Pennsylvania mandated. They taught to prepare for the Benchmark Test, which is given every 6 weeks in each major subject. They had AP Classes in American History, English Literature and Composition, and Calculus. They also supported Dual Enrollment classes. They administered the PSAT and SAT tests, and had SAT Prep courses in English. After-school activities included sports, arts clubs, academic clubs, career clubs, language clubs, and enrichment opportunities.

== School progress ==
In 2007, the percent of students who scored proficient or advanced on the PSSA in math (19%) and in reading (21%) was lower than the state target (Math-45%, Reading-54%). Lamberton's achievement on the PSSA was lower than the district and state averages. In common with 40% of Philadelphia public schools, Lamberton made adequate yearly progress (AYP) in 2007, because its performance had improved over the previous three years.

== Classroom acoustics ==
In 2009–10 the school received a major upgrade to the classroom acoustics to meet ANSI/ASA S12.60-2009 standards, which was documented in this video.

== Graduates ==
Lamberton graduates include Gerald Fleming (Old-School DJ ~ The Ohh Effect DJ's ™), 1981, graffiti artist Steve Powers (artist), 1987, Cpl. Christopher Milito, 1988, a police officer who died in the line of duty in 2010, actor Seth Green, 1991. comedian Big Jay Oakerson, ~1995. and actress Nafessa Williams, 2007.

== See also ==
- School District of Philadelphia
