= 1927 Philadelphia mayoral election =

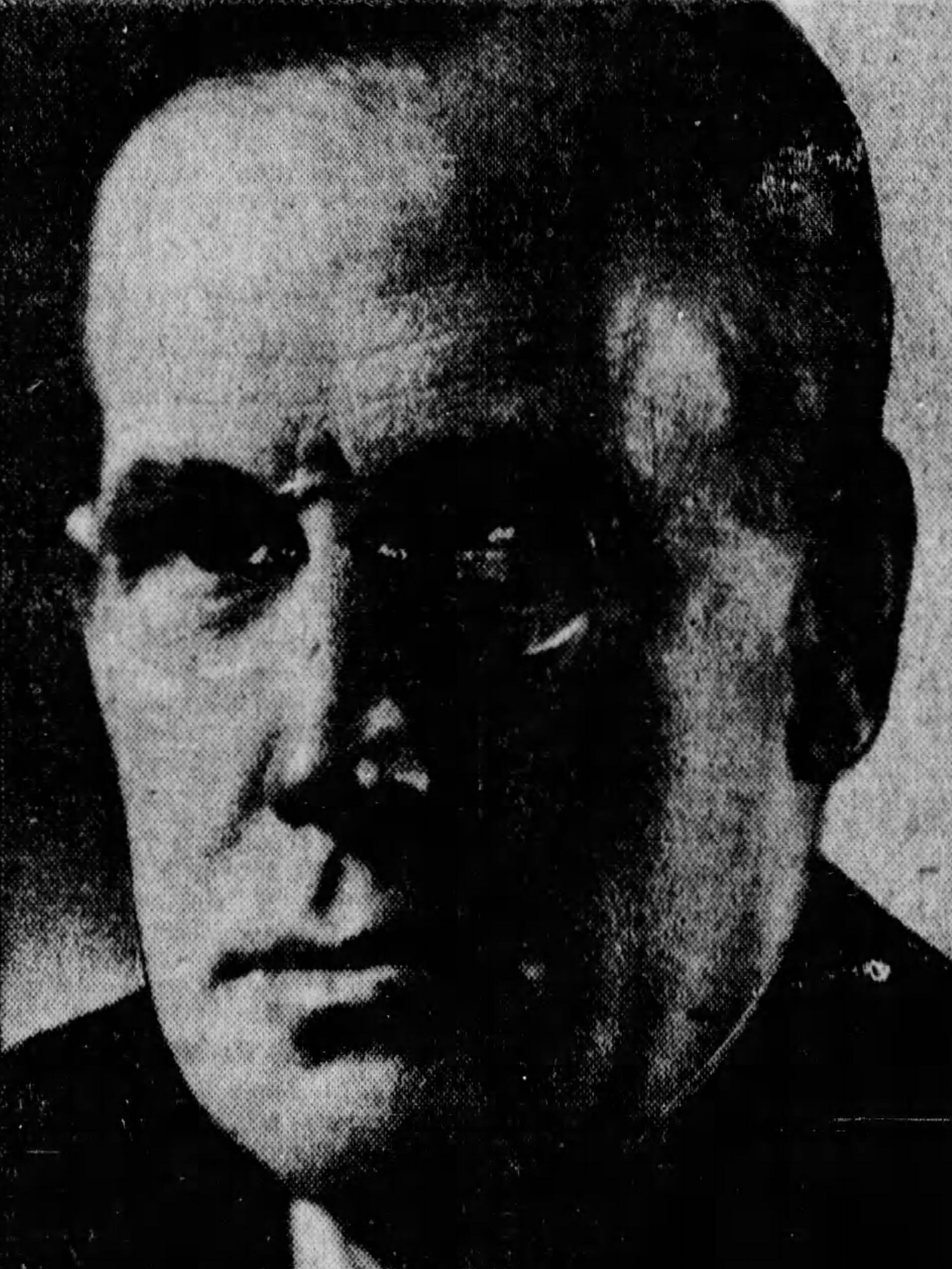

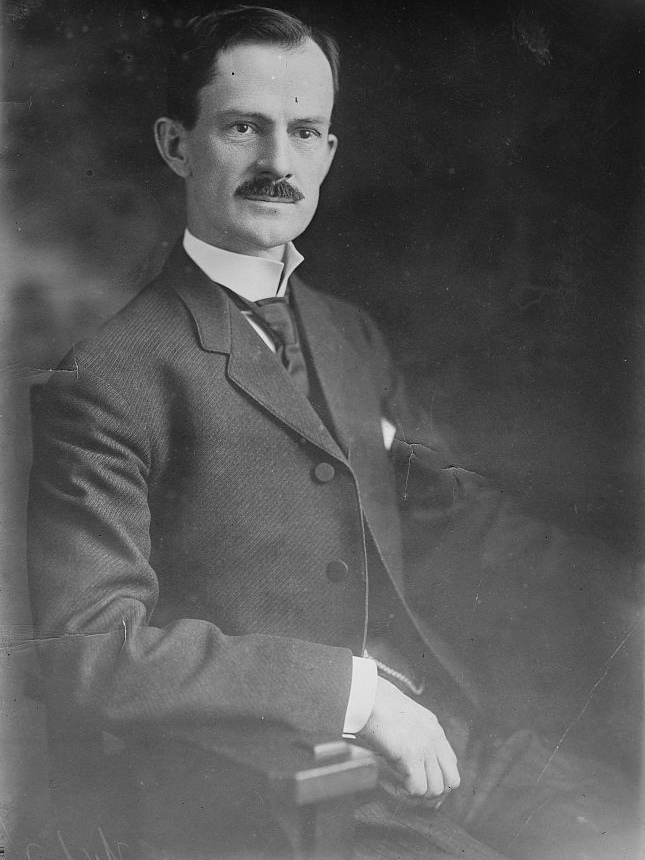
Nominee	Harry Arista Mackey	J. Hampton Moore
Party	Republican	Citizens'
Popular vote	296,959	128,611
Percentage	67.63%	29.29%
Mayor before election
W. Freeland Kendrick
Republican
Elected mayor
Harry Arista Mackey
Republican

The 1927 Philadelphia mayoral election saw Republican nominee Harry Arista Mackey defeat former Republican mayor J. Hampton Moore, who was running on the Citizens' party line.

== Results ==
1927 Philadelphia mayoral election (general election)
Party	Candidate	Votes	%
Republican	Harry Arista Mackey	296,959	67.63%
Citizens'	J. Hampton Moore	128,611	29.29%
Democratic	Thomas A. Logue	9,902	2.26%
Charterite	J.S. McLaughlin	3,605	0.82%
Turnout		439,077	
