= 1919 Philadelphia mayoral election =

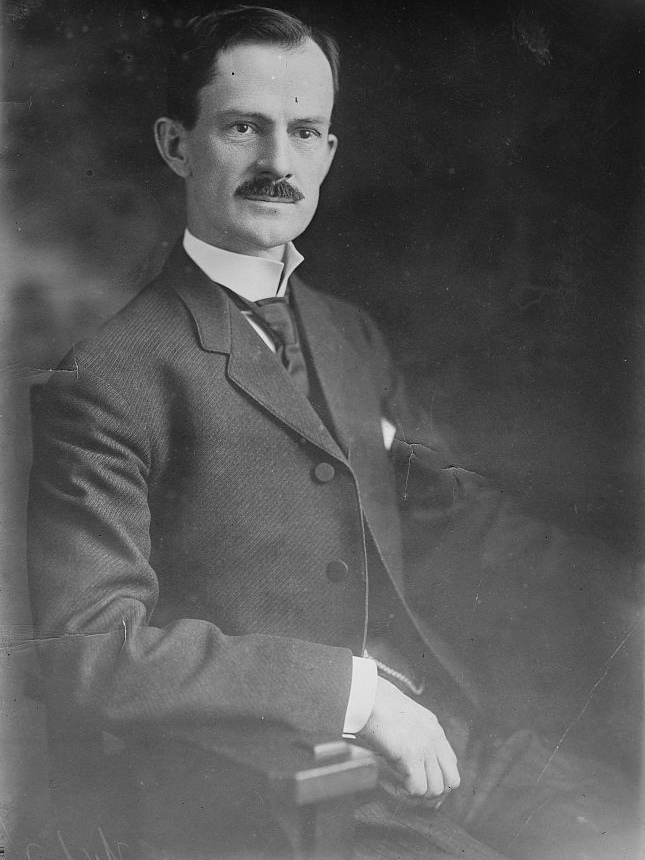

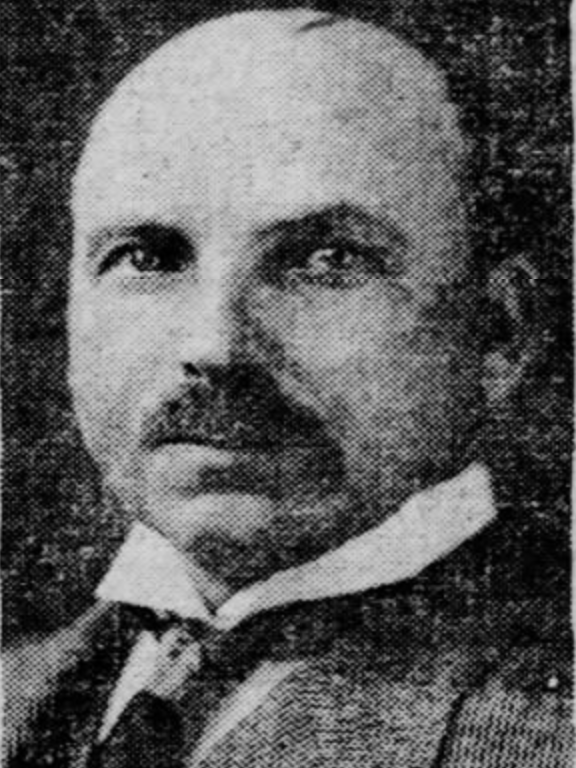

Nominee	J. Hampton Moore	Michael Donohoe	Joseph S. McLaughlin
Party	Republican	Democratic	Charterite
Popular vote	227,739	30,408	17,900
Percentage	80.65%	10.77%	6.34%
Mayor before election
Harry Arista Mackey
Republican
Elected mayor
J. Hampton Moore
Republican

The 1919 Philadelphia mayoral election saw the election of J. Hampton Moore.

== Results ==
1919 Philadelphia mayoral election (general election)
Party	Candidate	Votes	%
Republican	J. Hampton Moore	227,739	80.65%
Democratic	Michael Donohoe	30,408	10.77%
Charterite	Joseph S. McLaughlin	17,900	6.34%
Socialist	Charles Bauer	6,320	2.24%
Turnout		282,367	
