= Michael McDerman =

American actor, comedian, writer, producer, and podcast host (born 1977)

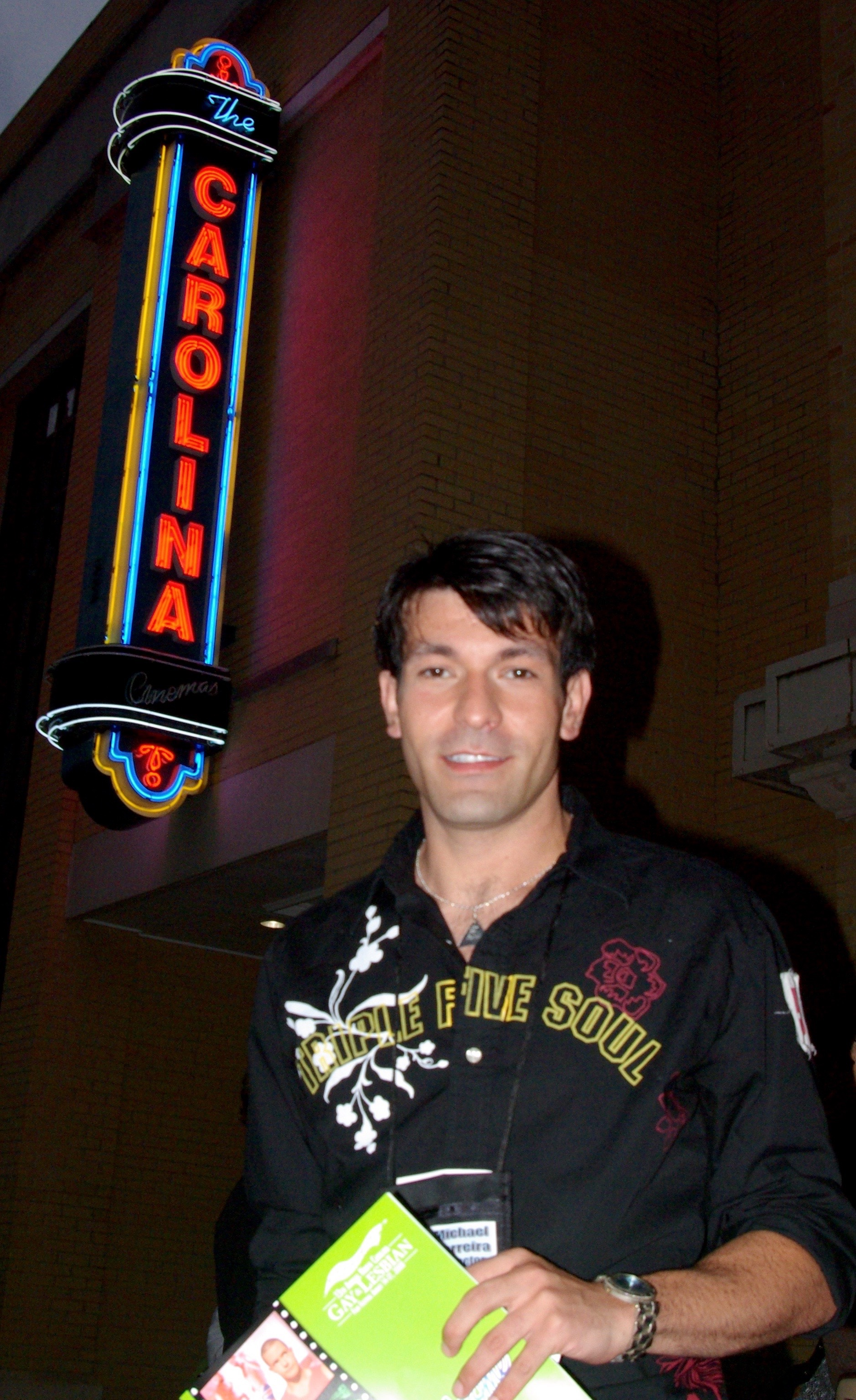
- Michael McDerman in 2008 at North Carolina Gay & Lesbian Film Festival
- Born: August 10, 1977 (age 48); New York City, United States
- Other names: Carmella Cann; Michael Ferreira
- Education: Baruch (MS)
- Occupation: Actor · comedian · writer · drag queen · producer · podcast host
- Website: carmellacann.com

Michael McDerman (born August 10, 1977) is an American actor, comedian, writer, producer, and podcast host.

== Early life ==
McDerman was born in Manhattan to a Portuguese American family. He attended Baruch College graduating in 2006 with a bachelor's degree. While in college, he worked as an actor and drag queen.

== Career ==
On September 16, 2003, McDerman appeared as his self-created alter ego, who he originated and portrayed, Carmella Cann, a drag queen judge on an episode of Ricki Lake entitled "How Straight Is He?" He has hosted many live events as Carmella Cann, including Rhode Island International Film Festival and The Original LGBT Expo in New York City.

He appeared on an episode of Law & Order: Special Victims Unit entitled "Brotherhood" in the role of Tyler Henry, a local fraternity pledge master that is sodomized and murdered, aired on January 6, 2004. Also, in 2004 he was in the stage play by H.M. Koutoukas, Ring of Death in the role of Vicar and Maid, at Theater for the New City, New York City. He has had an appearance on A&E (TV channel) 15 Films About Madonna, Z Rock, Viralcom, Under the Pink Carpet, One Life to Live, and the film's Voodoo You Believe and A Four Letter Word, directed by Casper Andreas. He appeared in 2006 in the television commercial for the New York Comedy Festival, alongside Jim Norton. He was featured in the book Straight Talk with Gay Guys: What Girlfriends Can't Tell You and Straight Men Won't by: Daylle Deanna Schwartz.

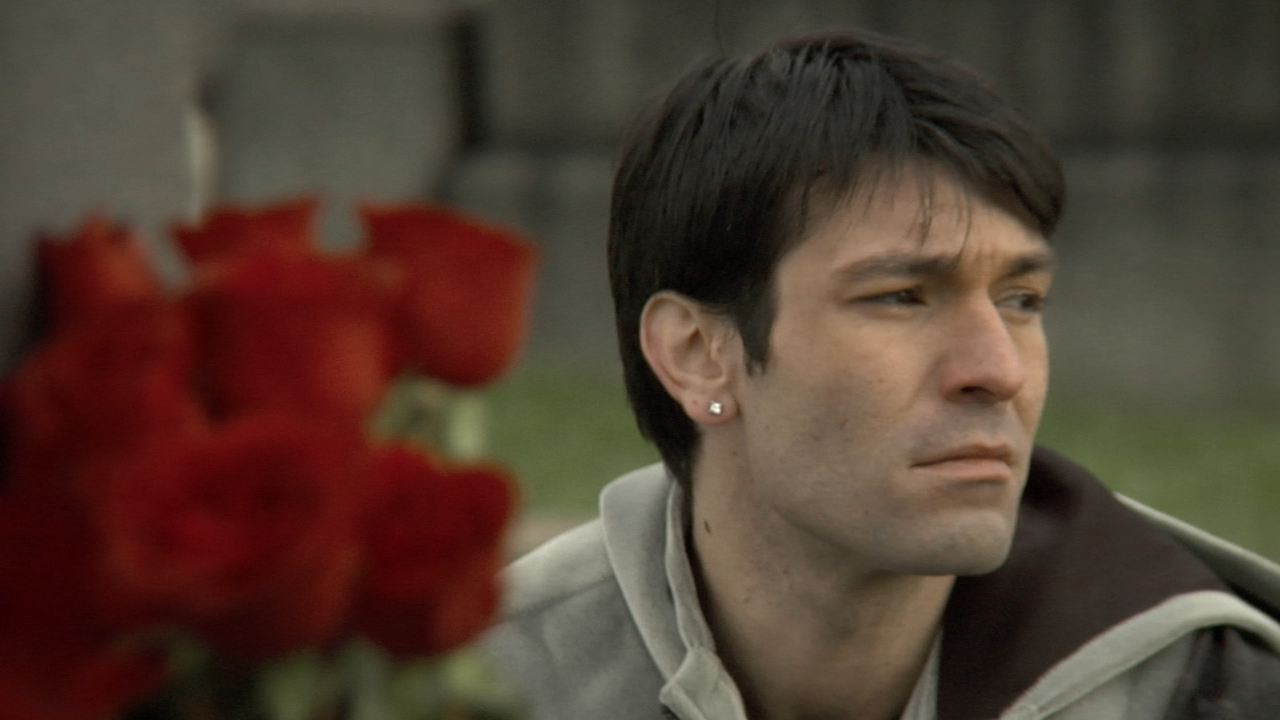
Michael McDerman in It's Me, Matthew!

In 2008, McDerman used the screen name Michael Ferreira, when he wrote, produced, and starred in the semi-autobiographical short film It's Me, Matthew! as the title character, alongside the renowned Michael Musto. In 2013, he was the theatre director for the Off-Off-Broadway stage play by Jean Bergantini Grillo, That Afternoon at Fred Campballs at Times Square Art Center, in New York City. Cann is scheduled to Host the Original LGBT Expo in March 2016.

In 2023, McDerman launched In The Cann With Carmella Cann, a biweekly podcast that blends drag culture with political commentary and entertainment. The show addresses current events, politics, and pop culture, featuring a drag-themed format. New episodes are released regularly and are available on platforms such as Spotify, Apple Podcasts, YouTube, Pandora (service), Amazon Music, iHeart Radio, and Manhattan Neighborhood Network. The podcast has featured notable guests such as former New York State Senator Tom Duane and actor, screenwriter, playwright Charles Busch.

== Education ==
McDerman holds a Master of Science in Industrial and Organizational Psychology from Weissman School of Arts and Sciences at Baruch College.

== Filmography ==
Television and Film
Year	Title	Role	Notes
1999	Trick	Dancer	(Film)
2002	One Life to Live	Man Diner	(TV Series), 1 episode: "Episode #1.8978"
2003	Sex and the City	Gay Guy #2 (uncredited)	(TV Series), 1 episode: "Hop, Skip, and a Week"
2004	Marie and Bruce	Yvonne	(Film)
2004	Law & Order: Special Victims Unit	Tyler Henry	(TV Series), 1 episode: "Brotherhood"
2005	Voodoo You Believe	Adrian	(Short film)
2006	15 Films About Madonna	Madonna - American Life	(TV Series), 1 episode: "Pilot"
2007	A Four Letter Word	Tess Tickles (credited as Michael Ferreira)	(Film)
2008	Z Rock	Stylist	(TV Series), 1 episode: "Episode #1.7"
2008	It's Me, Matthew!	Matthew / Ms. Cann (credited as Michael Ferreira)	(Short film)
2008	Viralcom	Carmella Cann (credited as Carmella Cann)	(TV Series), 1 episode: "You Got Yourself 30 Seconds"
2008	The Accidental Husband	Cake Consultant (uncredited)	(Film)
2023-2025	In The Cann with Carmella Cann	Carmella Cann (Host)	(Podcast Series), 30 episodes

== Published works ==
McDerman, wrote "Leading Ladies: A brief history of gay culture and its Founding Mothers" published in Next Magazine (New York City) (USA) June 19, 2006, pg. 28–29.

== Awards ==
McDerman, in 2008 shared a Juror Award at West Hollywood International Film Festival for the short film It's Me, Matthew!
