= Big Jay Oakerson =

American comedian

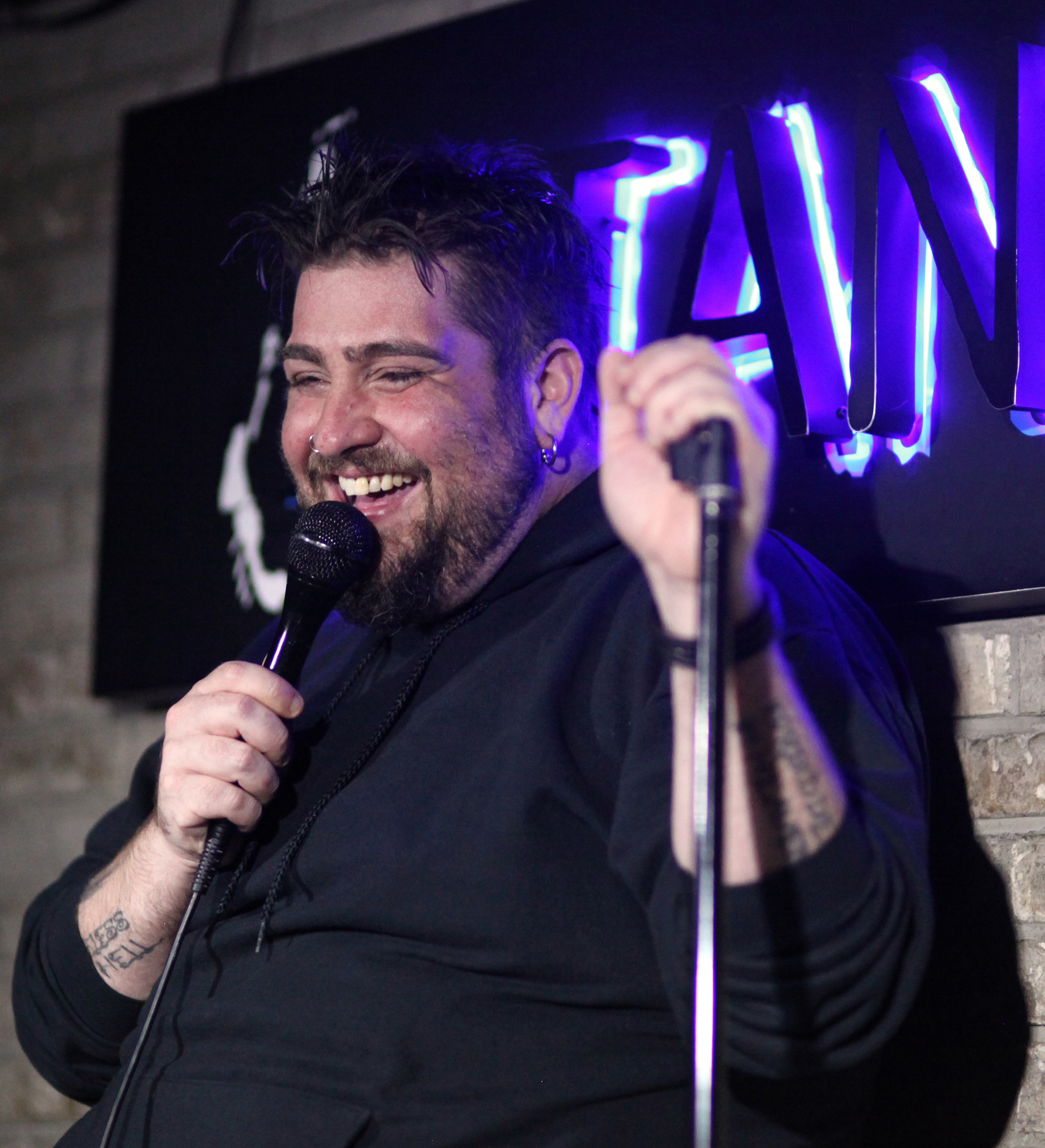
- Oakerson performing in May 2016
- Born: December 7, 1977 (age 48); Philadelphia, Pennsylvania, U.S.
- Alma mater: Camden County College
- Children: 1

Comedy career
- Medium: Television, stand-up, radio, podcasting
- Genres: Observational comedy, crude humor, off-color humor, shock humor, insult comedy, sarcasm, blue comedy, black comedy
- Subjects: Everyday life, current events, pop culture, human behavior, sex, race relations, self-deprecation
- Website: bigjaycomedy.com

Jason Michael "Big Jay" Oakerson (born December 7, 1977) is an American stand-up comedian, radio show host, podcaster and actor. He is the former co-host of The Bonfire, a two-hour live talk show presented on SiriusXM's Comedy Central Radio channel alongside fellow comedian Dan Soder from 2015 to 2023.

== Life and career ==
Oakerson was born in Philadelphia, Pennsylvania, and grew up in West Philadelphia, where he attended Robert E. Lamberton High School. During his senior year of high school, Oakerson moved to the Blackwood section of Gloucester Township, New Jersey with his mother and step-father who worked full-time. His father was absent for most of his childhood. He enrolled at Camden County College but left after a month to pursue comedy. He worked as a chauffeur/bouncer for strippers and children's parties to make ends meet. He opened for Dave Attell and toured with Korn before touring as a headliner.

His television credits include Comedy Central's Premium Blend, Comedy Central Presents, Inside Amy Schumer, Tough Crowd with Colin Quinn, and This Is Not Happening with Ari Shaffir, along with multiple appearances on BET's Comic View, HBO's P. Diddy's Bad Boys of Comedy and Crashing. He co-hosted Movies on Tap on Spike TV. He played Neil on the series Z Rock and appeared in the pilot episode of Louie, as well as an episode in the third season.

On December 1, 2014, Oakerson headlined a free charity show for supporters of morning show Preston & Steve and radio station WMMR in Philadelphia for the annual Campout for Hunger which supports Philabundance.

On June 17, 2016, Oakerson released his first hour long special titled, Live At Webster Hall. He also hosted Big Jay Oakerson's What's Your F@%king Deal?! on Seeso.

In 2025, Oakerson was cast in the Netflix original series, Tires, as a radio host named Dogman.

=== Podcast and radio show host ===
Oakerson hosts Legion of Skanks with comedian, Luis J. Gomez, and libertarian activist and comedian Dave Smith. He co-hosted the podcast The SDR Show on GaS Digital Network with Ralph Sutton until late 2024.

On July 27, 2015, Oakerson, along with fellow stand-up comedian Dan Soder, began their two-hour live radio talk show, The Bonfire, on SiriusXM's Comedy Central Radio channel airing every Monday through Thursday (previously Mondays and Wednesdays) from 6–8p.m. EST. Since March 1, 2021, the show aired on Faction Talk from 5–7p.m. EST after Comedy Central Radio ceased production on all of its talk shows. In 2023, Robert Kelly replaced Dan Soder as the co-host of The Bonfire.

In 2024, Oakerson started another podcast with Luis J. Gomez, Story Warz. A spin-off game show that originated as part of their Legion of Skanks podcast. The show's rules are that

== Specials and albums ==
| Title | Date | Platform |
|---|---|---|
| Live at Webster Hall | 2016 | Comedy Central |
| The Degenerates (Season 1) | 2018 | Netflix |
| Dog Belly | 2023 | Youtube |
| Them/They (Part 1) | 2025 | Youtube |
| Them/They (Part 2) | 2025 | Youtube |
| The Roast of Kevin Hart | 2026 | Netflix |
