= Penn Wynne, Pennsylvania =

Unincorporated community in Pennsylvania, US

Penn Wynne
- Census-designated place
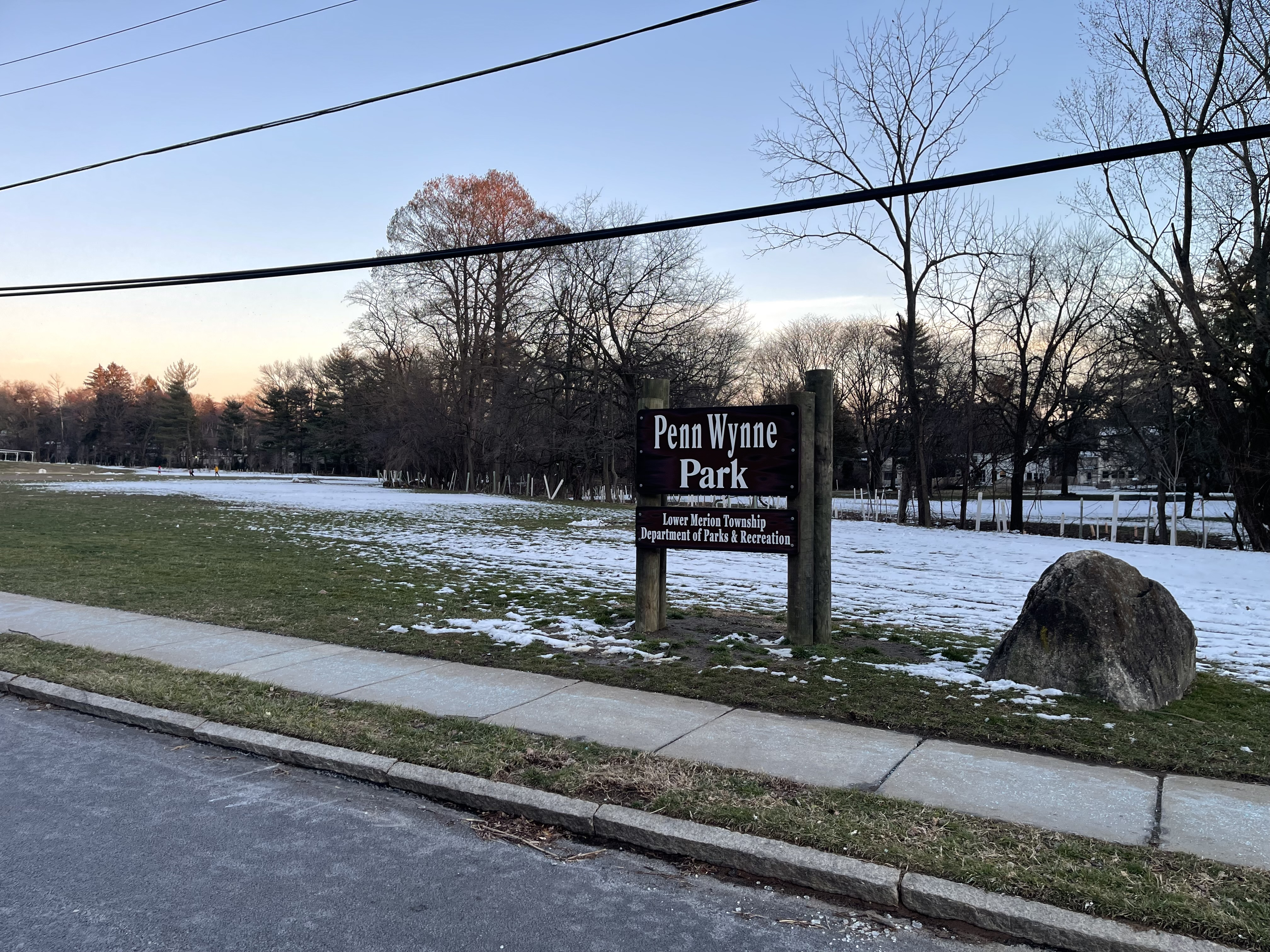
- Penn Wynne Park

- Location of Penn Wynne in Pennsylvania
- Coordinates: 39°59′02″N 75°16′28″W
- Country: United States
- State: Pennsylvania
- County: Montgomery
- Township: Lower Merion

Area
  - Total: 1.06 sq mi (2.75 km^{2})
  - Land: 1.06 sq mi (2.75 km^{2})
  - Water: 0 sq mi (0.00 km^{2})
- Elevation: 217 ft (66 m)

Population (2020)
  - Total: 6,493
  - Density: 6,107.0/sq mi (2,357.92/km^{2})
- Time zone: UTC-5 (EST)
  - Summer (DST): UTC-4 (EDT)
- Area code: 610
- FIPS code: 42-59312

Penn Wynne is a census-designated place (CDP) in Montgomery County, Pennsylvania, United States. It is part of Lower Merion Township, and the mailing address is Wynnewood. The population was 5,697 at the 2010 census. It is mainly a residential area. The main arteries are Haverford Road and Manoa Road.

== Geography ==
Penn Wynne is located at 39°59′2″N 75°16′28″W (39.984012, -75.274510).

According to the United States Census Bureau, the CDP has a total area of 1.0 square mile (2.6 km^{2}), all land.

== Demographics ==
Historical population
| Census | Pop. | Note | %± |
|---|---|---|---|
| 1970 | 6,038 | | — |
| 1990 | 5,807 | | — |
| 2000 | 5,382 | | −7.3% |
| 2010 | 5,697 | | 5.9% |
| 2020 | 6,493 | | 14.0% |
U.S. Decennial Census

As of the 2020 census, the CDP was 65.7% Non-Hispanic White, 7.3% Black or African American, 15.6% Asian, 9.6% Hispanic or Latino, 9.6% Two or More Races.

As of the 2010 census, the CDP was 78.7% Non-Hispanic White, 7.2% Black or African American, 0.1% Native American and Alaskan Native, 9.5% Asian, 0.4% were Some Other Race, and 1.8% were two or more races. 2.8% of the population were of Hispanic or Latino ancestry.

As of the census of 2000, there were 5,382 people, 2,072 households, and 1,504 families residing in the CDP. The population density was 5,158.1 inhabitants per square mile (1,991.6/km^{2}). There were 2,113 housing units at an average density of 2,025.1 per square mile (781.9/km^{2}). In 2018, 88% of the housing units in Penn Wynne were occupied by their owner.

The racial makeup of the CDP was 91.43% White, 3.66% African American, 3.57% Asian, 0.45% from other races and 0.89% from two or more races. Hispanic or Latino of any race were 1.24% of the population.

There were 2,072 households, out of which 33.6% had children under the age of 18 living with them, 63.2% were married couples living together, 7.9% had a female householder with no husband present, and 27.4% were non-families. 25.1% of all households were made up of individuals, and 16.6% had someone living alone who was 65 years of age or older. The average household size was 2.48 and the average family size was 2.98.

In the CDP, the population was spread out, with 24.1% under the age of 18, 3.0% from 18 to 24, 22.0% from 25 to 44, 25.0% from 45 to 64, and 25.8% who were 65 years of age or older. The median age was 45 years. For every 100 females, there were 84.3 males. For every 100 females age 18 and over, there were 78.4 males.

The median income for a household in the CDP in 2024 dollars is $150,298, and the per capital income is $75,026. About 5.2% of the population were below the poverty line.

== History ==
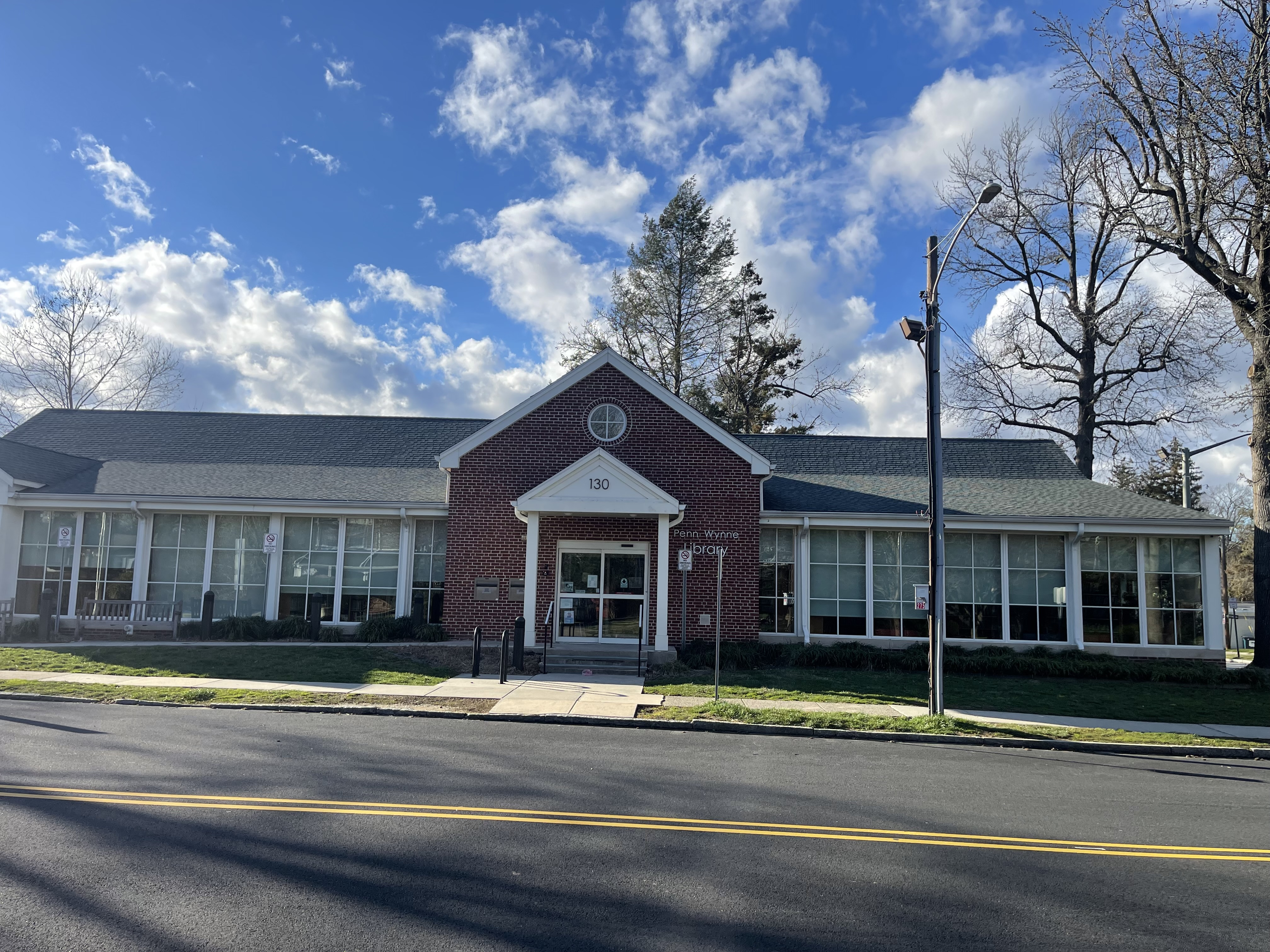
Penn Wynne Library, part of the Lower Merion Library System.

The Penn Wynne area was first known as the Green Hill Zone plantation. It was established in the 17th century by Welsh Quaker Thomas Lloyd.

In the early 1900s, the land was subdivided and developed. There are two sections to Penn Wynne. The southern section primarily contains twin homes built from the early 1920s to the mid-1940s. The northern section of Penn Wynne contains larger, single family homes, generally built after the homes in the southern section.

== Elected officials ==
The following is a list of elected officials representing Penn Wynne:

Federal Offices

- U.S. Senators: Dave McCormick (R) and John Fetterman (D)
- U.S. Representative: Mary Gay Scanlon (D)

Pennsylvania Offices

- Governor: Josh Shapiro (D)
- Lieutenant Governor: Austin Davis (D)
- State Senator: Amanda Cappelletti (D)
- State Representative: Tim Briggs (D)
- State Constables: Julie Sokoloff (D) and Eric Bradway (D)

County Offices

- County Commissioner: Val Arkoosh (D)
- County Commissioner: Ken E. Lawrence Jr. (D)
- County Commissioner: Joe Gale (R)
- District Attorney: Kevin Steele (D)
- Magisterial District Judge, Court 38-2-04: Karen Eisner Zucker (D)

Local Offices

- Lower Merion Township Commissioner: Rick Churchill (D)
- Lower Merion Township Treasurer: Samuel T. Adenbaum (D)
- Lower Merion School District Members: Robin Vann Lynch (President), Melissa Gilbert (Vice President), Laurie Actman, Diane DiBonaventuro, Ben Driscoll, David Federman, Maureen O'Leary, Virginia Pollard, and Subha Robinson

== Community services ==
Penn Wynne is served by the Penn Wynne Fire Company, a volunteer fire company that covers the Penn Wynne neighborhood.

== Education ==
Penn Wynne is within the Lower Merion School District. The school zoning is as follows: All of the CDP is zoned to Penn Wynne Elementary School, an award-winning, Blue Ribbon school, and Black Rock Middle School. High school students in the CDP have a choice between Harriton High School and Lower Merion High School.

== Community ==
Although Penn Wynne is considered an urban neighborhood (based on population density), most streets are lined with large trees maintained by the Lower Merion Shade Tree Commission. Public parks provide additional green spaces as well as a variety of amenities for use by members of the community:

- Penn Wynne Park (10 acres) on East Manoa Road: baseball, basketball, softball, tennis courts, soccer, comfort station, children's play ground, tot lot
- Shortridge Park (12.3 acres) on Shortridge Drive between Remington Road and East Wynnewood Road - sledding area, nature park.
- South Ardmore Park (18.2 acres) - baseball, basketball, soccer, softball, tot lot, tennis courts, children's playground, comfort stations.
- Wynnewood Valley Park (10.9 acres) - basketball, tennis courts (with Pickleball Lines), children's playground, tot lot, nature park, picnic tables, comfort station, garden for the blind.

=== Penn Wynne Civic Association ===
The Penn Wynne Civic Association ("PWCA") is dedicated to serving Penn Wynne residents. The organization defines the boundaries of Penn Wynne as the Delaware County line to the west, Remington Road to the north, Lancaster Avenue to the east and City Avenue to the south.

The PWCA is a community organization, not a political organization. The PWCA's goal is to remain neutral on political matters. However, the PWCA has on occasion taken up community causes that have broad support. For example, in the past, the PWCA has opposed Lankenau Hospital's proposed access route through Manoa Road and has been active in promoting public safety in the Penn Wynne community.

The PWCA holds an annual Fourth of July parade in the neighborhood. The parade route goes through the Penn Wynne area before ending at the Penn Wynne Elementary School. When the parade ends, the PWCA hosts a Fourth of July celebration, where games are provided for children in the neighborhood, food is sold, and awards are given to community leaders.

In addition to the annual Fourth of July parade, the PWCA holds an annual meeting in October, where the PWCA usually provides a forum for officials running for elective office.

The PWCA holds its monthly board meetings every first Thursday of the month at 7:30 pm at the Penn Wynne Library on Overbrook Parkway.

=== Jewish community ===
Penn Wynne has a large Jewish population consisting of many Orthodox Jews. It has been a popular destination of many Jews leaving the adjacent Philadelphia neighborhood of Overbrook Park. Congregation Beth Hamedrosh, an Orthodox synagogue that had been situated in Overbrook Park since 1958, bought a property in Penn Wynne in 2000. Following the process of getting zoning permits and fundraising, groundbreaking for the new synagogue building was started in May 2006. A ceremonial ground breaking was held on June 11, 2006. Rabbis spoke, as did former Lower Merion Township Commissioner Lance Rogers, US Representative Jim Gerlach, and Pennsylvania Assemblyman Daylin Leach. The synagogue moved from its temporary location in Overbrook Park into the new site at 200 Haverford Road upon the completion of the building on May 31, 2007. The first weekday services were held on the evening of May 31. The sanctuary of the new building, now attached to the house originally on the property, was used for the inaugural Shabbat services of June 1–2. A gala celebration event took place on Sunday, June 3, which featured the marching of Torah scrolls from the local Jewish Community Center along Haverford Road to the new site following speeches by rabbis, Commissioner Rogers, Assemblyman Leach, and the President of the synagogue, followed by food and dancing with live music in the sanctuary.

Chabad of Penn Wynne, originally located in Rabbi Zalman Gerber's house, moved to a store front on Manoa Road across the street from the new synagogue building of Congregation Beth Hamedrosh soon after the latter moved in, but Chabad moved out three years later following the termination of the storefront lease at the end of May 2010. In the same Manoa Road storefront block, for a short time in 2007, there was also Just Chill, a kosher water ice and ice cream store. On June 5, 2010, Chabad of Penn Wynne began to hold Shabbat services at the Family Hall of the local Jewish Community Center. Chabad attracted many new Chabad families from out of town and many of them moved to Overbrook Park. Chabad had to relocate due to the coronavirus pandemic and starting with Rosh Hashana in September, 2020, Chabad is now across City Line Avenue in Overbrook Park in the same shopping center that is home to New York Bagels. After 13 years with no synagogue, Overbrook Park again has a synagogue.

The Jewish community on both sides of City Avenue, the border between Philadelphia and Montgomery County, are considered to be one unit and are connected by an eruv, a wire attached to the telephone and electric poles which allows religious Jews to carry things on Shabbat.

In addition to the Orthodox Jewish amenities, Penn Wynne is home to the Kaiserman branch of the Jewish Community Center.
