= Z Rock (TV series) =

- Created by: Mark Mark Productions, Andrew Gottlieb
- Directed by: Mark Farrell
- Starring: Paulie Zablidowsky; David Zablidowsky; Joey Cassata; Lynne Koplitz; Jay Oakerson
- Country of origin: United States
- No. of seasons: 2
- No. of episodes: 20

Production
- Running time: Approx. 27 minutes

Original release
- Network: IFC
- Release: August 24, 2008 – August 9, 2009

Z Rock is an American comedy television series that aired on IFC in the United States. The show is a semi-scripted comedy and is based on the double life of a Brooklyn band, ZO2. By night, they are a hard rock band but, to pay the bills, they are the "Z Brothers" by day, playing at children's birthday parties. ZO2 consists of brothers Paulie Z, David Z and their childhood friend Joey Cassata portraying fictionalized versions of themselves.

The series was filmed and produced in New York City by Mark Mark Productions.

== Characters ==
=== Major characters ===
Name	Actor	Role
Paulie Zablidowsky	Himself	Lead vocalist and guitarist of Z02 / Z Brothers
David Zablidowsky	Himself	Bassist for Z02 / Z Brothers
Joey Cassata	Himself	Drummer for Z02 / Z Brothers
Dina	Lynne Koplitz	The band's manager
Neil	Jay Oakerson	The club manager who is in love with Paulie Z

=== Guest stars ===
- Joan Rivers as herself
- John Popper as himself
- Marky Ramone as himself
- Dave Navarro as himself
- Dee Snider as himself
- Bethenny Frankel as Bethenny the chef
- Sebastian Bach as himself
- Dave Attell as himself
- Alison Becker as Joey's girlfriend Becky
- Gilbert Gottfried as himself
- Patrice O'Neal as Darren the stage manager
- Warren Sapp as himself
- Bonnie Bernstein as herself
- Melissa Rivers as herself
- Daryl Hall as himself
- Constantine Maroulis as himself
- Chris Barron as himself
- Chris Jericho as himself
- Michael McDerman as Stylist
- Greg Giraldo as Harry Bronstein
- Jim Norton as himself
- Jeff Ross as himself
- Eddie Trunk as himself
- Steel Panther as themselves
- Frank Stallone as himself
- Eddie Ojeda
- Jay Jay French
- Joe Derosa as Squirt Reynolds
- Carmine Appice
- Jay Decay

== Episodes ==
=== Season 1 (2008) ===
No.	Title	Original release date	Prod. code
1	"Episode 1"	August 24, 2008	101
After a gig, Paulie and David have an all-nighter with some groupies. They oversleep the next morning, only to realize that they might miss the most important gig of all: a kid's party for a major record executive who holds the power to give them a record deal.
2	"Episode 2"	August 31, 2008	102
The boys show up for a kid's party in Long Island, only to find out it's been double-booked by their kiddie world nemesis, Kidtastic!. Guest starring the Whitest Kids U Know.
3	"Episode 3"	September 7, 2008	103
The Z Brothers meet John Popper after playing at a bris. After a little persuasion, Popper offers the group a record deal, though it may not be exactly what the group is expecting. Guest starring John Popper.
4	"Episode 4"	September 14, 2008	104
John Popper wants to show the guys how awesome being a full-time kids band can be, and he books them for a $10,000 birthday party for Gilbert Gottfried's son. Guest starring Gilbert Gottfried and John Popper.
5	"Episode 5"	September 21, 2008	105
Neil can't handle his feelings for Paulie, and he puts the kabosh on their regular gig at Southpaw. ZO2 gets a gig at Manhattan's Cutting Room, but the crowd isn't really a fan of rock music, and the evening descends into chaos. Guest Starring Joan Rivers and Patrice O'Neal.
6	"Episode 6"	September 28, 2008	106
The guys shoot their first music video under the direction of Dave Navarro who is just coming off a major adult movie shoot. The band begins to question the direction the music video is going in, causing Navarro to storm off the shoot, leaving the music video without a director. Guest starring Dave Navarro and Joe DeRosa.
7	"Episode 7"	October 5, 2008	107
The band's future is rocky as each member pursues different paths. Paulie pursues his solo career, David tries modeling, and Joey searches for himself. In the end, they must decide whether to stay as a band or go their separate ways. Guest starring Dee Snider.
8	"Episode 8"	October 10, 2008	108
The group's hard work pays off when they get a fantastic break opening for Joan Rivers. However, the temptation of the casinos affects them all, and they put their careers in jeopardy in the process. Guest starring Joan Rivers.
9	"Episode 9"	October 19, 2008	109
The boys don't want to sell out, and they decide to reject John Poppers deal, until they realize their friend Dina sacrificed everything to make it happen. They accept the deal, only to find out that the major record exec wants to sign their group after all. Guest starring Dave Attell, Joan Rivers and John Popper.
10	"Episode 10"	October 26, 2008	110
The boys begin working for John Popper, but they soon discover they aren't allowed to write their own music. Dina tries to convince Popper to let the group out of their deal, and he gives them a way by tasking them to reek vengeance on Harry Braunstein, the record exec that is offering the band a chance to sign with the major record company.

=== Season 2 (2009) ===
No.	Title	Original release date	Prod. code
11	"Z-united"	June 7, 2009	201
Months after their major record deal falls through, the band is faced with the hardships of life and decide to break up. With a little help from old friends, the boys are forced to come face-to-face with each other, and then they're able to confront the man who cost them their careers. Guest starring Joan Rivers, Dee Snider, Greg Giraldo, and Alison Becker
12	"I Wanna Be Z-dated"	June 14, 2009	202
With the band's career back on track, they now have time to focus on women. Joey meets a woman who cooks just like his Nonna, Paulie meets a lady who is so awesome he'd move to Rwanda with her, and David finds himself in the middle of a band in love. Guest Starring Bonnie Bernstein and Bethenny Frankel.
13	"All Z Small Things"	June 21, 2009	203
Things look up when the boys get a break playing for a lesbian couple's adopted Chinese child's party. Dina nabs the band an opening-gig for Kiss, but their hopes are dashed when they realize that it isn't the KISS they thought it would be. Guest Starring Mini-Kiss and Frank Stallone.
14	"Jail House Z Rock"	June 28, 2009	204
Neil finds himself on a road trip with the group after they get a two-night gig opening for Brett Michaels. Neil finds himself in his hometown of Chappaqua, and he drags ZO2 with him as he settles some old scores. Guest Starring Jay Jay French and Joe Matarese.
15	"Z Are Family"	July 5, 2009	205
The boys meet up with Dave Navarro again, and after they forgive him for abandoning their music video shoot, they audition him to see if he can make the cut as ZO2 material. A few ghosts from the past reappear, including Dina's past fling, rock legend Daryl Hall. Guest Starring Daryl Hall and Dave Navarro.
16	"Z Wrestler"	July 12, 2009	206
The boys get to squeeze into some spandex and capes for a wrestling-themed kids' party, but their wrestling personas might get the group into a bit of trouble. Guest Starring Jeff Ross, Jim Norton and Chris Jericho.
17	"Z My Baby"	July 19, 2009	207
The band's Battle of the Bands position is jeopardized when Joey hurts his knee, opening the door for their rival Steel Panther to win the coveted $15,000 prize. A pregnant ex comes back to visit David, and she brings along her former pro-football player fiance. Guest Starring Warren Sapp, Steel Panther, Julissa Bermudez, and Eddie Trunk.
18	"Z Rock This Town"	July 26, 2009	208
ZO2 is recruited by a local Brooklyn politician to play at a rally, but his supposed mafia connections puts the boys in a sticky situation. They must decide whether to reject the gig and save their reputations, which in turn may cost them their necks. Guest Starring Patrice O'Neal and Kurt Metzger.
19	"Johnny Z. Goode"	August 2, 2009	209
John Popper returns to make amends with the boys by providing the group lunch and getting Paulie an audition for Broadway's "Rock of Ages." Dina and Popper explore old passions with condiments, and things lead to an interesting proposition. Guest Starring John Popper, Constantine Maroulis, Joan Rivers, Marky Ramone and Cornelius T. Funnybuster.
20	"Z Will Rock You"	August 9, 2009	210
ZO2 lands an awesome gig playing at a "B-iz-ar Mitzvah", a Bar Mitzvah for a popular black rapper being filmed for a new reality television series. The question is: could breaking the sanctity of Judaism's sacred traditions threaten the boys' future stardom? Guest Starring Gilbert Gottfried, Jason Flom, Gary Dell'Abate, John Popper, Julian McCullough, Joan Rivers and Bailey Whitney.
