= ZO2 (band) =

American rock band

- Genres: Rock, hard rock
- Years active: 2003-present
- Members: Paulie Zablidowsky, Joey Cassata, Sean McNabb
- Past members: David Zablidowsky

ZO2 is a New York rock band with Brooklyn roots formed in 2003 when Paul Zablidowsky (“Paulie Z”) and his brother David Zablidowsky (“David Z”) (known as the “Z brothers”) approached drummer Joey Cassata to join their band. The trio is known for making throwback rock with Paulie Z on vocals and guitar, David Z on vocals and bass, and Joey Cassata on drums, percussion, and vocals.”

== Background ==
ZO2 was technically formed from the remnants of the New York based KISS tribute band, KISSNATION. Joey Cassata and Paulie Z portrayed Eric Carr and Paul Stanley in the act, respectively. As they toured with KISSNATION, Paulie Z convinced Joey to join him and his brother, David in their original band, which ultimately became ZO2. In the early years, the band made ends meet by playing at children’s birthday parties around New York where their clients included Robert De Niro, Michael J. Fox and Al Roker. When asked about their decision to play children’s parties, Paulie Z explained, “[i]t was really only to fund ZO2.”

=== Releases ===
On March 27, 2004, the Brooklyn rockers released their first album, Tuesdays & Thursdays. ZO2 released its second studio album, Ain't It Beautiful, on August 7, 2007. The band released its third album, Casino Logic, on June 9, 2009.

=== Live performances ===
ZO2 landed its first national tour in 2004, playing 40 dates on the VH1 Rock the Nation tour as the opening act for Kiss and Poison. The band has also performed with Stone Temple Pilots, Alice Cooper, Twisted Sister, Scorpions, Sammy Hagar, Dream Theater, King’s X and more. The band became known for their full, power trio sound. Many compared them to a modern day Led Zeppelin or KISS. Joey Cassata held it down with his aggressive yet groove filled drumming, Paulie Z was a throwback to the rock lead singers/guitar players from the 1970's and David Z laid the foundation down with some extraordinary bass playing.

=== Television ===
ZO2 became the subject of a television series created by the Independent Film Channel, called “Z Rock,” which originally aired on August 24, 2008. The series was a fictionalized, semi-scripted series based on the real lives of the members of ZO2, leading a double-life by on the one hand, playing birthday parties for the children of Manhattan’s elite by day and on the other hand, living the life of real rock stars trying to make money, get a record deal, and partying by night.

When asked why ZO2 wanted to do the series, David Z explained, “The [‘Z Rock’] storyline is absolutely based on our real lives,” . . . [e]ach episode is heavily detailed and scripted, and we fill in the blanks and ad lib the lines, like Larry David’s ‘Curb Your Enthusiasm’ — but with rock ’n’ roll enthusiasm. . . For us, the reason to do [‘Z Rock’] is it’s an amazing outlet for our music to be heard,” explained David. “Radio is amazing, and TV is bigger than radio. If you see people like Gene Simmons and Bret Michaels, everyone knows who they are, because of their shows [A&E’s ‘Family Jewels’ and VH1’s ‘Rock of Love’]. Now everybody knows them by name.”

Z Rock was picked up for a second season in June 2009, with ZO2 and its members continuing to appear.

Z Rock was such a massive hit for IFC, the network eagerly wanted to bring the show back for a third season, being that it had become one of IFC's highest rated shows. However, prior to filming season 3, ZO2's management team had such ridiculous demands for the network that IFC decided it would be easier to drop the show than deal with the crazy demands of their management. This was the beginning of the end for the band in its current form.

=== Break-Up ===
After the cancellation of Z Rock, the band plodded on for a few more years, but with creative and personal differences mounting, they finally decided to call it quits around 2015. In 2017, while David Z was on tour with Adrenaline Mob, he was killed in a tragic accident while travelling to the next show.

=== Reunion ===
ZO2 officially announced in 2023 that they would be reuniting and releasing a new greatest hits album with additional unreleased material. Sean McNabb would be taking over the bass playing role after David Z tragically had passed away in 2017. They filmed their reunion show at the Whiskey in California and continue to do sporadic appearances, playing through their greatest hits to the delight of their hardcore fan base.
