= Samuel Davis Wilson =

American politician

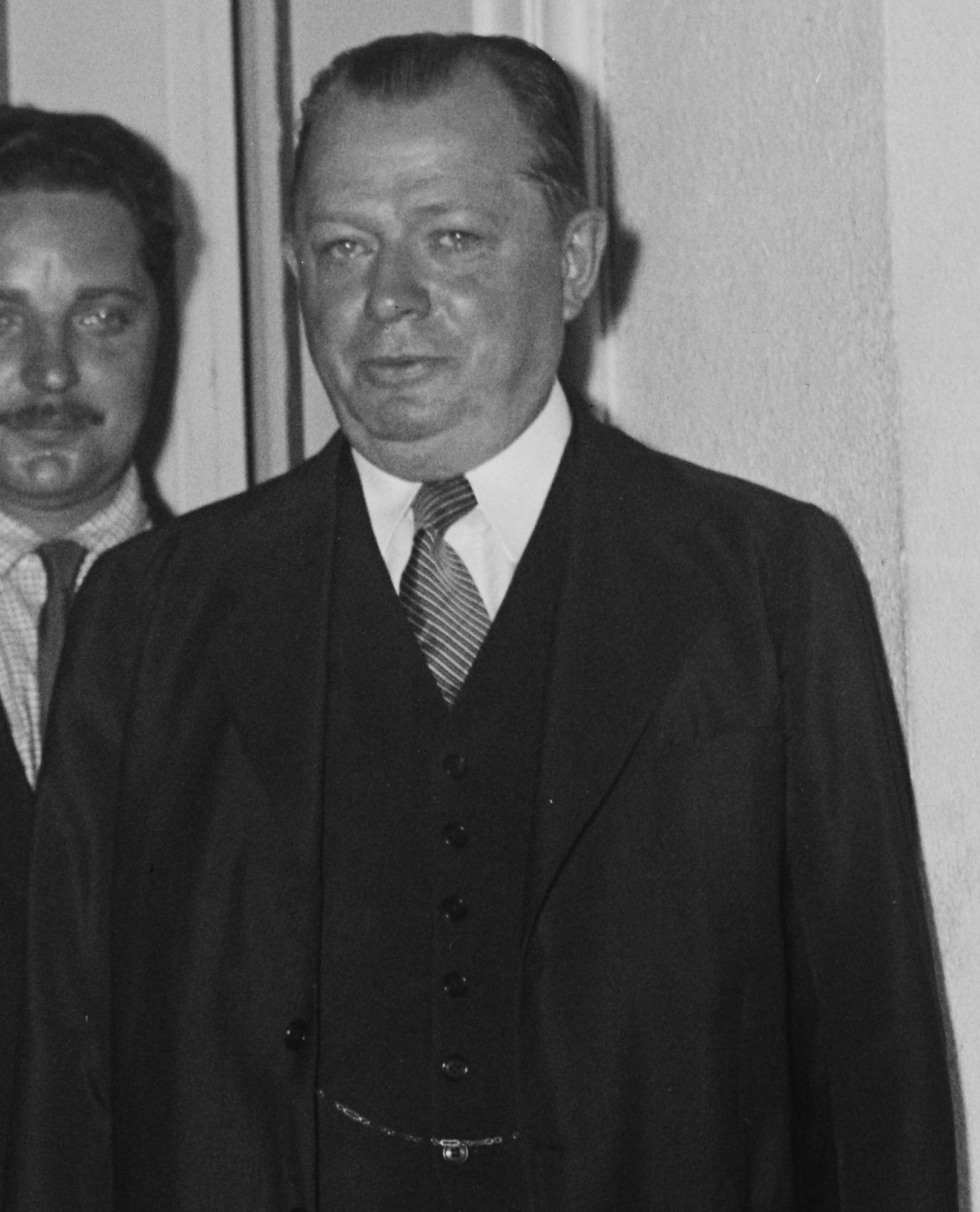

86th Mayor of Philadelphia
- In office January 6, 1936 – August 11, 1939
- Preceded by: J. Hampton Moore
- Succeeded by: George Connell

Personal details
- Born: August 31, 1881 Boston, Massachusetts
- Died: August 19, 1939 (aged 57) Philadelphia, Pennsylvania
- Party: Republican

Samuel Davis Wilson (August 31, 1881 – August 19, 1939) was an American politician; he served as the 86th Mayor of Philadelphia from 1936 until his death in 1939.

== Early life and career ==
Wilson was born in Boston in 1881. He was educated at the Phillips Exeter Academy.

== Career ==
He moved to Philadelphia in 1905 and was a supporter of Rudolph Blankenburg's reform administration. In 1912, he directed Woodrow Wilson's campaign offices in Philadelphia. By 1927 he found work as an assistant to the city controller Will B. Hadley. This brought him in contact with Philadelphia political community. In 1930, he worked as a campaign manager for the Republican Gifford Pinchot’s gubernatorial campaign. This elevated his profile, leading him to a successful candidacy for city controller in 1931. He explored a run for the governor’s mansion in 1931 as a Democrat but dropped out and supported George Earle, who won the election.

He entered the 1935 race for mayor as a Republican after the Democratic Party selected John B. Kelly Sr., a former Olympic rower and the father of Grace Kelly. With the unusually strong challenge from Kelly, Wilson's campaign at one point resorted to antisemitic rhetoric, accusing Kelly of being beholden to Jewish interests. Wilson won the election, but by only 45,000 votes. This was one of the closest elections in Philadelphia history and a strong result for the Democrats in the reliably Republican city.

As mayor, he clashed with Republican leaders and took on the Philadelphia Rapid Transit Company and UGI, the city's gas operator. Though he campaigned against the New Deal prior to his election, he quickly became an open supporter of Franklin D. Roosevelt, lobbying for Philadelphia to host the 1936 Democratic National Convention. Wilson aligned himself with Philadelphia's burgeoning organized labor movement, establishing the Mayor's Labor Board, hiring the building trades' legal counsel M. Herbert Syme as city solicitor and firing the anti-union police commissioner Kern Dodge. He attended union conventions and meetings and supported organizing drives. Wilson also took steps toward dismantling the Republican-controlled patronage machine in municipal government. Wilson made overtures to Black political self-determination as mayor, accepting invitations to speak at the National Negro Congress and canceling a parade celebrating the Italian invasion of Ethiopia following a Black-led boycott of Italian businesses over the issue.

In 1937, Wilson re-registered to vote as non-partisan, breaking with the Republican party.

Despite his ties with the labor movement, Wilson attempted to prevent Philadelphia's public sector workers from unionizing. The first modern municipal workers' strike in Philadelphia took place during his administration, from March 11–17 1937. Wilson attempted to break the strike by employing non-union workers and mobilizing the police. He eventually agreed to some of the strikers' demands, but recognized an independent union instead of the Teamster-affiliated Local 470 that had gone on strike.

After 264 municipal workers were laid off in October 1938, the Municipal Workers' Union voted to strike again. Wilson once again attempted to break the strike, but it had considerable support from the public and the strikers and their allies were able to effectively prevent municipal trash collection, forcing the Wilson administration to negotiate. The city agreed to all union demands including reinstatement of the furloughed workers and overtime pay. The MWU was granted a charter by the American Federation of State, County and Municipal Employees and the Wilson administration recognized Local 222. It became the first AFSCME local recognized by a major American city.

He ran in the Democratic primary election for United States Senate against Governor Earle. He had publicly blamed Earle for wiretaps on his secretary's phone. The race wasn't close and Earle won handily by over 500,000 votes with Davis failing to carry any wards in Philadelphia.

Wilson's actions cost him much of his political support. The district attorney of Philadelphia secured an indictment against him for failure to stop widespread gambling in the city, but a judge dismissed the charges.

He became ill in 1939 and sent a letter to the City Council to have the council president assume his duties on August 11. He died on August 19, 1939 after a stroke. George Connell succeeded him as mayor and served out the rest of his term.

Political offices
Preceded by J. Hampton Moore	Mayor of Philadelphia; January 6, 1936 – August 11, 1939	Succeeded by George Connell
