= Robert Eneas Lamberton =

American politician (1886-1941)

Robert Lamberton

88th Mayor of Philadelphia
- In office January 1, 1940 – August 22, 1941
- Preceded by: George Connell
- Succeeded by: Bernard Samuel

Personal details
- Born: September 14, 1886 Bethlehem, Pennsylvania, U.S.
- Died: August 22, 1941 (aged 54) Longport, New Jersey, U.S.
- Resting place: West Laurel Hill Cemetery, Bala Cynwyd, Pennsylvania, U.S.
- Party: Republican

Robert Eneas Lamberton (September 14, 1886 – August 22, 1941) was an American politician. He was a Republican who served as the 88th mayor of Philadelphia from 1940 to 1941. He was elected to the Philadelphia City Council in 1915, served as sheriff of Philadelphia County, and as a judge in the Court of Common Pleas.

== Early life and education ==
He was born in Bethlehem, Pennsylvania. He received an A.B. degree from the University of Pennsylvania in 1906 and a LL.B. degree in 1910. He was captain of the water polo team in 1906 and a member of the football team in 1908 and 1909. He was a member of Sigma Alpha Epsilon and the Philomathean Society as well as class president from 1908 to 1910.

== Career ==
He was elected to the Philadelphia City Council in 1915, served as sheriff of Philadelphia County, and as a judge in the Court of Common Pleas. He ran an unsuccessful campaign for Pennsylvania Governor in 1934. He ran successfully for Philadelphia mayor in 1939 against Robert White, a Democrat, garnering 398,384 votes to White's 361,143.

Lamberton suffered from Parkinson's disease and died at his shore house in Longport, New Jersey on August 22, 1941. He was interred at West Laurel Hill Cemetery in Bala Cynwyd, Pennsylvania. City Council president Bernard Samuel succeeded him as mayor.

== Personal life ==
He married Helen H. Lamberton and together they had five children. He lived in the Germantown neighborhood of Philadelphia.

== Legacy ==
The Robert E. Lamberton High School in the Overbrook Park neighborhood of Philadelphia was named in his honor.

Political offices
Preceded by George Connell	Mayor of Philadelphia; 1940–1941	Succeeded by Bernard Samuel
