= George Connell (mayor) =

American politician

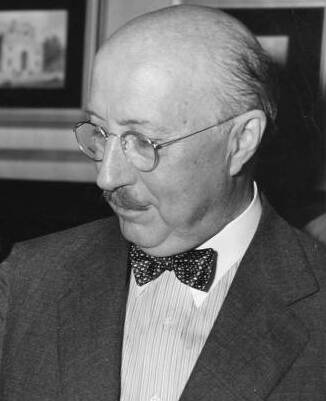
- Connell during oath taking ceremony, 1939

87th Mayor of Philadelphia
- In office August 11, 1939 – January 1, 1940
- Preceded by: Samuel Davis Wilson
- Succeeded by: Robert Eneas Lamberton

President of the Philadelphia City Council
- In office January 1936 – August 11, 1939

Member of the Philadelphia City Council
- In office 1913 – August 12, 1939

Personal details
- Born: November 2, 1871 Philadelphia, Pennsylvania, U.S.
- Died: October 23, 1955 (aged 83) Philadelphia, Pennsylvania, U.S.
- Party: Republican

George H. Connell (November 2, 1871 – October 22, 1955, Philadelphia) was a US Republican politician. He was a member of the Philadelphia City Council from 1913 to 1939 and was acting Mayor of Philadelphia in 1939.

== Biography ==
Connell was born on November 2, 1871, in the Cobbs Creek section of Philadelphia.His father was Horatio P. Connell, who had served as Sheriff of Philadelphia. His grandfather, George Connell was a member of the Pennsylvania State Senate whose accomplishments including pushing legislation for the creation of Fairmount Park and Mount Moriah Cemetery.

A member of the Republican, he became active in Philadelphia politics and served as the Republican chair for the 40th ward in West Philadelphia. He became a member of the Philadelphia City Council in 1913, first as a member of the Common Council and then the Select Council after 1915. In January 1936, he became the city council president.

On August 11, 1939, mayor Samuel Davis Wilson, who had been seriously ill, retired as mayor in hopes that he would better recover without the stress of his position. As the city council president, Connell was sworn in as acting mayor that day. Having taken over, he immediately ordered 210 police officers from administrative work to patrol duties because of a shortage of patrol officers in the city.

For much of his term, Connell grappled with the city's budget during the Great Depression. He addressed the council on the need to identify $9 million in revenue to avoid cutting city services. He obtained a $41 million loan from the Reconstruction Finance Corporation in September 1939 that would be backed by revenues of the city's natural gas plant as an initial step. He proposed the installation of up to 8,000 parking meters across the city in another bid to add revenue. In December 1939, shortly before his term expired, Connell and the city council, with a vote of 17 to 3 in favor, approved a wage tax of 1.5% on earned incomes from both city residents and commuters. A worker at the Philadelphia Navy Yard sued the city, alleging that the tax was unconstitutional. In 1943, the Pennsylvania Supreme Court in the case of Kiker v. Philadelphia ruled that the wage tax was indeed constitutional and upheld it. The tax remains in place as of 2020 and is Philadelphia's largest source of tax revenue.

Although recognized by the city as a Mayor of Philadelphia, Connell was often referred to as the acting mayor in media reports. The City Charter at the time called for the election of a replacement of the mayor by a vote of the council, with the council president holding office until that election. While the council intended to vote in Connell's favor, an obscure provision in the charter stated that a member of council would not be eligible to hold another office "during the term for which he shall have been elected as Councilman." Upon discovery, some members of the council interpreted this to mean that Connell could not formally be elected as Mayor. The council's options were to ignore the portion of the charter requiring the council to elect a mayor or to elect Connell and allow the issue to be resolved in the courts. Regardless of the decisions around seating Connell as mayor, he served out the remainder of Wilson's term until Robert Lamberton's inauguration on January 1, 1940. After Connell left office, Mayor Lamberton appointed him as Director of Public Welfare.

Connell died on October 22, 1955, after a stroke and is interred at Mount Moriah Cemetery in Philadelphia.

Political offices
Preceded by Samuel Davis Wilson	Mayor of Philadelphia; 1939–1940	Succeeded by Robert Eneas Lamberton
