= W. Freeland Kendrick =

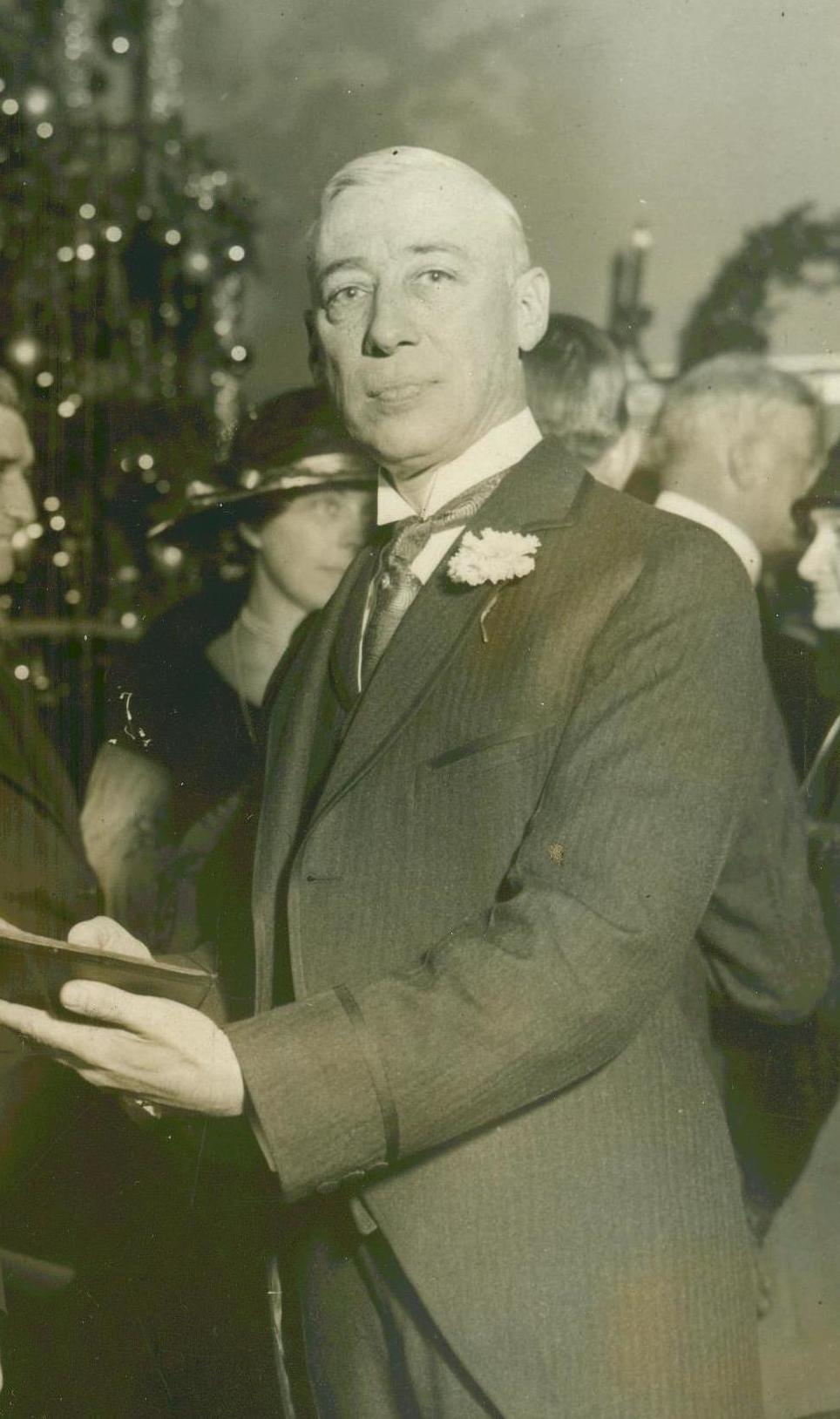
W. Freeland Kendrick in 1924

W. Freeland Kendrick (1873 – March 20, 1953) was the Republican Mayor of Philadelphia from 1924 to 1928.

== Biography ==
Kendrick served as a delegate from Pennsylvania to the Republican National Convention in 1920, and served as the president of the Sesquicentennial Exposition in Philadelphia in 1926.

One of Kendrick's first actions after being elected as mayor of Philadelphia in 1923 was to recruit Marine Corps Brigadier General Smedley Butler to serve as Philadelphia's director of public safety, to enforce Prohibition and vice laws. After a contentious two years, Kendrick dismissed Butler on December 22, 1925.

== Shriner ==
Kendrick was also an active Shriner, serving as Potentate of the Lulu Shrine from 1906 to 1918, and again from 1920 to 1923. He was elected Imperial Potentate from 1919 to 1920 and served as the second chairman of the board of trustees of the Shriners from 1934 to 1949. While he was serving as Imperial Potentate, he put forth the resolution that created the Shriners Hospitals for Children.

From 1949 until his death, he served on the board of trustees for the Philadelphia Shriners Hospital.

Political offices
Preceded by J. Hampton Moore	Mayor of Philadelphia; 1924–1928	Succeeded by Harry Arista Mackey
