= J. Hampton Moore =

American politician (1864-1950)

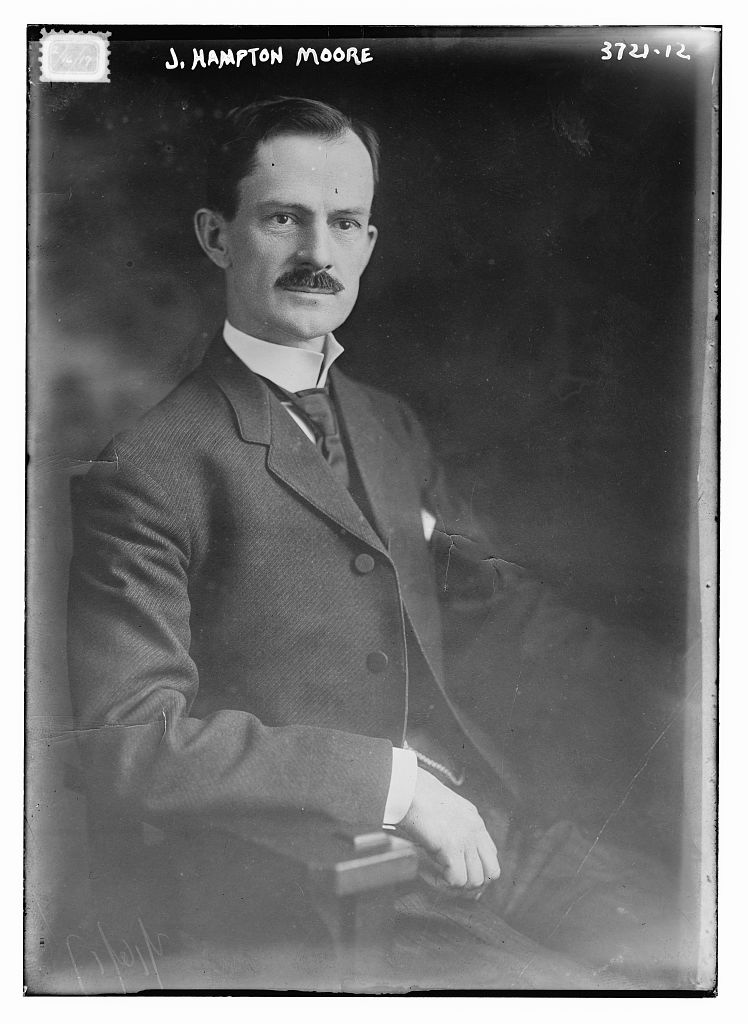
- Moore in 1916

83rd and 85th Mayor of Philadelphia
- In office January 4, 1920 – January 4, 1924
- Preceded by: Thomas B. Smith
- Succeeded by: W. Freeland Kendrick
- In office January 4, 1932 – January 4, 1936
- Preceded by: Harry Arista Mackey
- Succeeded by: Samuel Davis Wilson

Member of the U.S. House of Representatives from Pennsylvania's 3rd district
- In office November 6, 1906 – January 4, 1920
- Preceded by: George Castor
- Succeeded by: Harry C. Ransley

Personal details
- Born: Joseph Hampton Moore; March 8, 1864 Woodbury, New Jersey, U.S.
- Died: May 2, 1950 (age 86) Drexel Hill, Pennsylvania, U.S.
- Resting place: West Laurel Hill Cemetery, Bala Cynwyd, Pennsylvania, U.S.
- Party: Republican

Joseph Hampton Moore (March 8, 1864 – May 2, 1950) was an American politician who served as a Republican member of the United States House of Representatives for Pennsylvania's 3rd congressional district from 1906 to 1920. He resigned from Congress and served as the 83rd Mayor of Philadelphia from 1920 to 1924 and the 85th Mayor of Philadelphia from 1932 to 1936.

== Early life ==
Moore was born March 8, 1864, in Woodbury, New Jersey, to Mary Jane Dorff and Joseph Borton Moore. The family moved to Camden, New Jersey, where his father operated a grocery store. He was educated in a country school in Woodbury and attended Richard Fetters Grammar School after the family moved to Camden. At thirteen years of age, he took a job with a law firm. He studied law in his spare time. He never received a law degree but stayed close to the law as a court reporter for the Court Combination from 1881 to 1894.

The publisher of the Philadelphia Public Ledger, George William Childs, was impressed by Moore and hired him as a real estate editor and court reporter. In 1889, Moore was the first Philadelphia reporter to travel to Johnstown, Pennsylvania, and report on the Johnstown Flood.

== Career ==
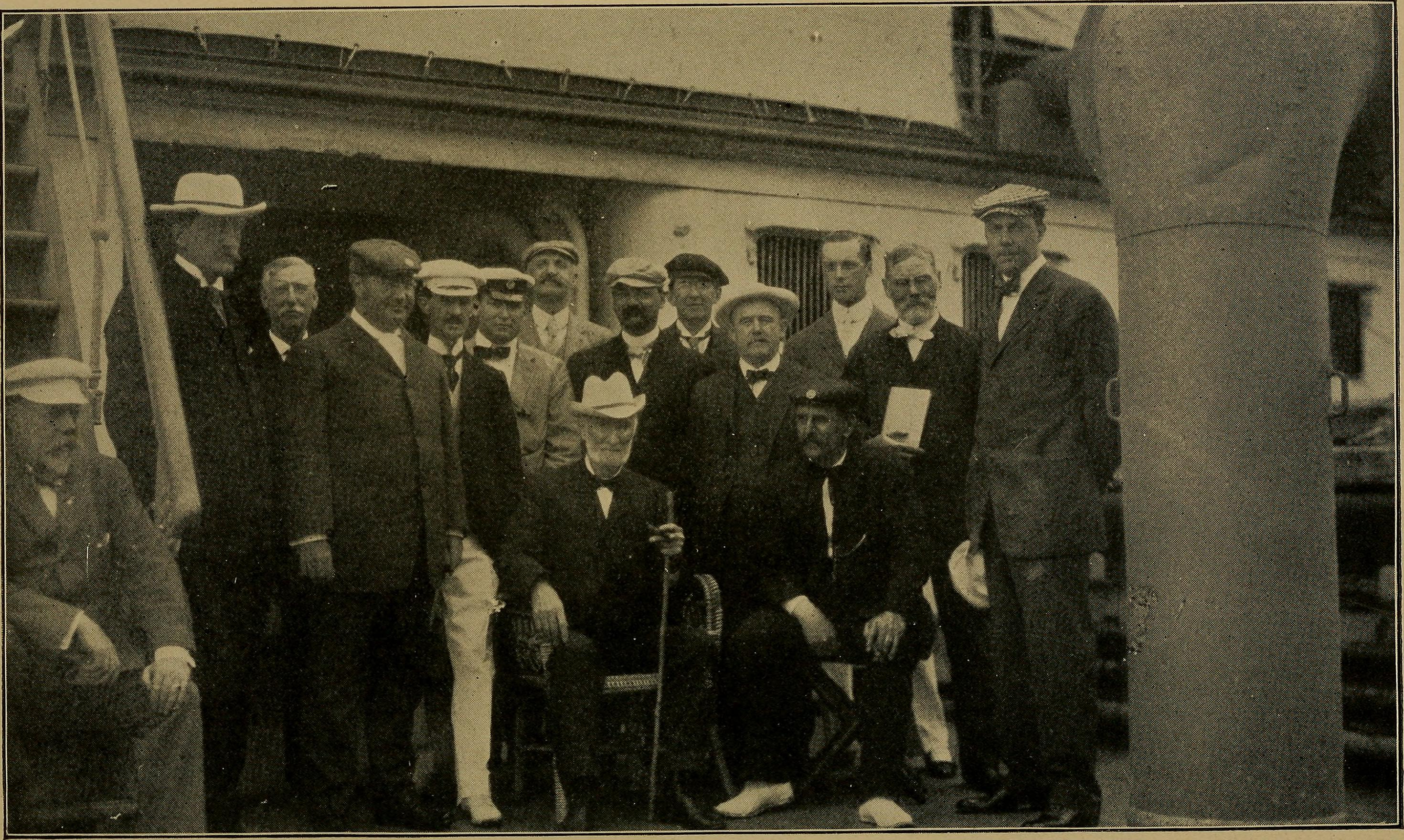
Photo from With Speaker Cannon through the tropics : a descriptive story of a voyage to the West Indies, Venezuela and Panama: containing views of the Speaker upon our colonial possessions (1907)

He was chief clerk to the city treasurer of Philadelphia from 1894 to 1897 and secretary to the mayor in 1900. He served as president of the Allied Republican Clubs of Philadelphia, of the Pennsylvania State League, and of the National League of Republican Clubs from 1900 to 1906. He worked as city treasurer from 1901 to 1903. He was appointed by President Theodore Roosevelt as the first Chief of the Bureau of Manufactures, Department of Commerce and Labor, in January 1905, but resigned after six months' service to become president of a Philadelphia bank. He was president of the Atlantic Deeper Waterways Association from 1907 to 1947.

Moore was elected as a Republican to the 59th Congress to fill the vacancy caused by the death of George A. Castor. He was re-elected seven times and served from November 6, 1906, to January 4, 1920, when he resigned to become the mayor of Philadelphia. He was a delegate to the 1920 Republican National Convention.

Elected in 1919, Moore first served as mayor of Philadelphia from 1920 to 1924. He was then appointed by the United States State Department as a delegate to the International Navigation Congress at Cairo, Egypt, in 1926. After being defeated in 1927, he returned to the mayor's office in Philadelphia following a victory in the 1931 Philadelphia mayoral election, serving from 1932 to 1936.

During his terms as mayor, Moore banned the showing of films by Roscoe Arbuckle because the charges pending against Arbuckle for rape and murder would offend public morals. This motion occurred concurrent with Arbuckle's arrest, prior to Arbuckle's trial and eventual acquittal.

He was a founding member of the Five O'Clock Club of Philadelphia.

He died May 2, 1950, in Philadelphia and was interred at West Laurel Hill Cemetery in Bala Cynwyd, Pennsylvania.

== Personal life ==
In 1889, Moore married Adelaide Stone and together they had eight children.

== Legacy ==
Moore was one of three mayors of Philadelphia the city honored by naming a fireboat after him. An elementary school, located at Summerdale and Longshore Avenues in Philadelphia, was built and named after him in the 1950s. It is still in operation today

== Works (partial list) ==
- Roosevelt and the Old Guard (1925)

U.S. House of Representatives
Preceded by George A. Castor	Member of the U.S. House of Representatives from Pennsylvania's 3rd congressional district 1906–1920	Succeeded by Harry C. Ransley
Political offices
Preceded by Thomas B. Smith	Mayor of Philadelphia; 1920–1923	Succeeded by W. Freeland Kendrick
Preceded by Harry Arista Mackey	Mayor of Philadelphia; 1932–1935	Succeeded by Samuel Davis Wilson
