= Overbrook Park, Philadelphia =

Overbrook Park
- Neighborhood of Philadelphia
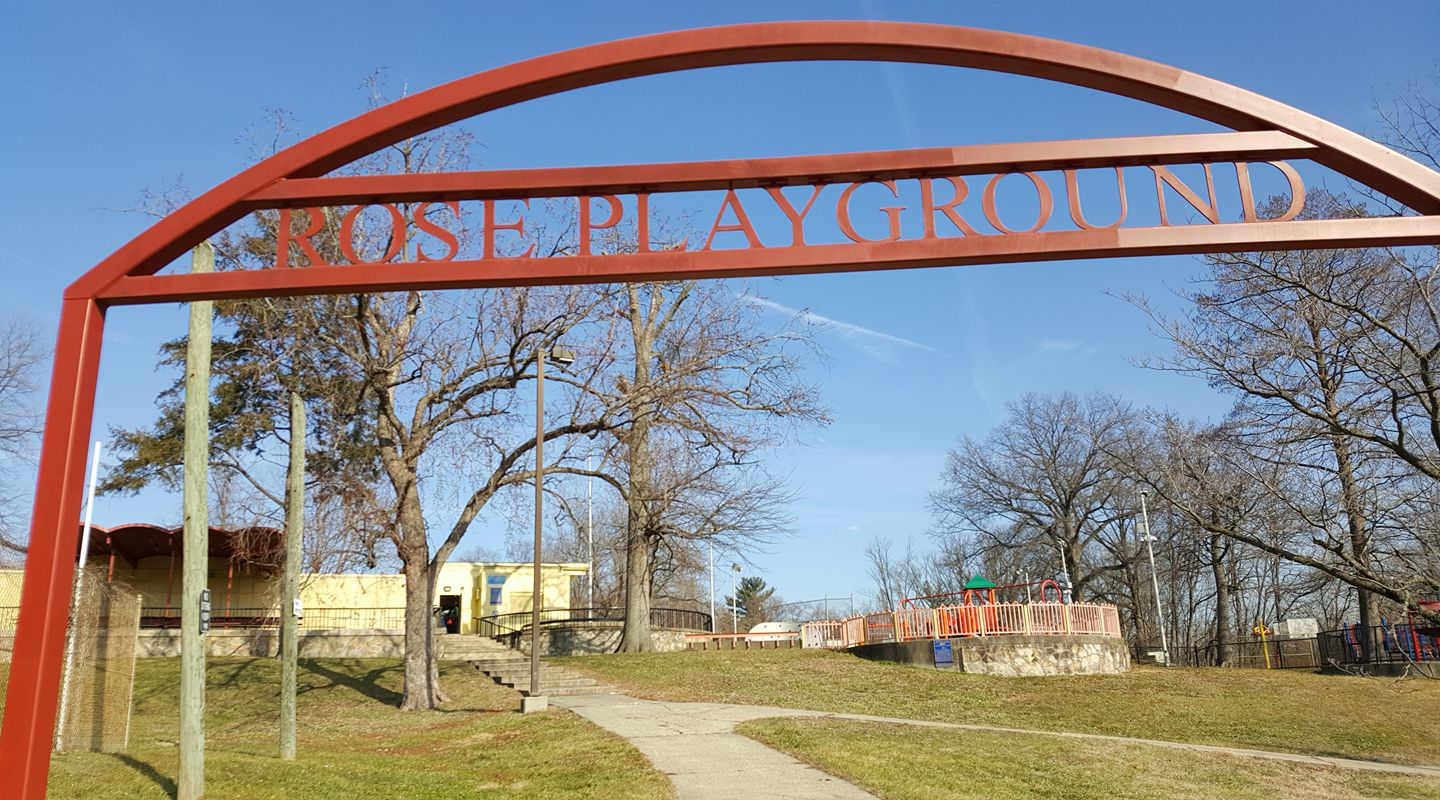
- Rose Playground in Overbrook Park

- Location within Philadelphia
- Country: United States
- State: Pennsylvania
- County: Philadelphia
- City: Philadelphia
- Area codes: 215, 267, and 445

Overbrook Park is a neighborhood in the West Philadelphia section of Philadelphia, Pennsylvania, United States. It was founded in the 1940s on the site of a former farm known as Supio's farm, offering new housing for returning GIs and their families. Overbrook Park is a largely middle-class African-American and historically Jewish neighborhood.

== Boundaries ==
Overbrook Park is bounded by Overbrook to the east, Penn Wynne to the north, Upper Darby to the south and west, and Havertown to the west. The main artery is Haverford Avenue which goes into Penn Wynne across City Avenue where it becomes Haverford Road. Haverford Avenue and 75th Street connect it to Lansdowne Avenue on the Overbrook side, which continues south through Upper Darby where it becomes State Road. Haverford Avenue, 76th Street, and 77th Street connect it to City Avenue on the Penn Wynne side.

The neighborhood spans for approximately four city blocks west to east along City Avenue, and approximately ten smaller blocks north to south on either side of 76th Street. Overbrook Park has a public school named after Robert Eneas Lamberton, a former Republican mayor of Philadelphia. It was once a K–12 school and the only one of its kind in Philadelphia. Today it is a K-8 school. Lamberton School is located at 75th Street and Woodbine Avenue.

== History ==
Overbrook Park used to have a large Jewish population. There was an Orthodox and a Conservative synagogue. Most of the Jewish people have moved across City Avenue (U.S. 1) into neighboring Penn Wynne in Lower Merion Township. The Jewish community of both sides of the border are considered to be one unit and are connected by an eruv, a wire attached to the telephone and electric poles which allows religious Jews to carry things on Shabbat.

The Orthodox Congregation Beth Hamedrosh was founded in the late 1950s as a branch of Beth Hamedrosh HaGadol in West Philadelphia. The congregation moved to Penn Wynne in May 2007, after having purchased the site in 2000. The Building that housed Beth Hamedrosh is now Temple Kefarym, a Black Hebrew congregation which is now boarded up following a fire.

The Conservative Congregation Beth T'fillah, originally called Overbrook Park Congregation founded in 1948, closed down in the fall of 2006 and merged with Temple Adath Israel in Merion, Lower Merion Township due to a lack of sufficient membership. The building that housed Beth T'fillah is now Overbrook Park Church of Christ.

In 1990, Overbrook Park had some 7,200 residents, mostly of Jewish, Italian and Irish origins. During the mid-1990s, the neighborhood started to become majority African American. By 2000, the neighborhood's population had become nearly 60% African American. Today it is approximately 81% African American

Despite the demographic change, there are still several kosher establishments in Overbrook Park. In 2017, Chabad of Penn Wynne and Congregation Beth Hamedrosh, formerly of Overbrook Park, were awarded a grant by The Kohelet Foundation to assist with promoting Overbrook Park as an affordable neighborhood for young Jewish families. Starting with Rosh Hashana in September 2020, Chabad of Penn Wynne is now located in Overbrook Park in the same shopping center that is home to New York Bagels. It was previously located at the Kaiserman JCC across City Line Avenue but had to relocate due to the coronavirus pandemic. After 13 years with no synagogue, Overbrook Park again has a synagogue.

Overbrook Park is the birthplace of actor Seth Green.
