= Harry Arista Mackey =

American politician (1869–1938)

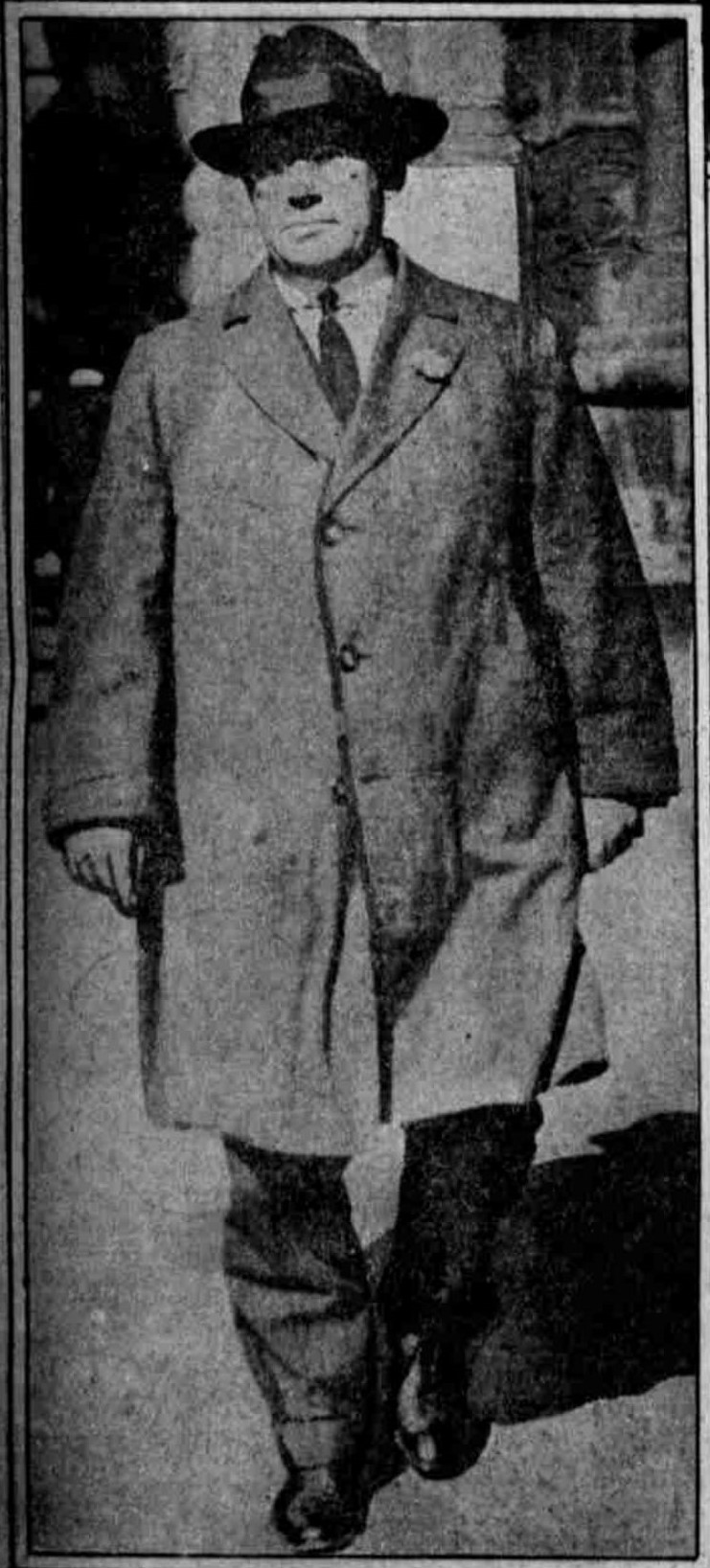
- Mackey in Philadelphia, 1916

84th mayor of Philadelphia
- In office 1928–1931
- Preceded by: W. Freeland Kendrick
- Succeeded by: J. Hampton Moore

Personal details
- Born: June 26, 1869 Susquehanna, Pennsylvania, U.S.
- Died: October 17, 1938 (aged 69) Philadelphia, Pennsylvania, U.S.
- Resting place: West Laurel Hill Cemetery, Bala Cynwyd, Pennsylvania, U.S.
- Education: Lafayette College and University of Pennsylvania Law School

Harry Arista Mackey (June 26, 1869 – October 17, 1938) was an American politician who served as the mayor of Philadelphia from 1928 to 1932.

== Early life and career ==
Born in Susquehanna, Pennsylvania, and a native of Bangor, Pennsylvania, Mackey was educated at the Scranton High School, Keystone Academy, Lafayette College, and the University of Pennsylvania Law School. He played football and baseball at Lafayette, where he captained both squads during the 1889–90 academic year. At Penn, he played football from 1891 to 1893, serving as team captain in 1893.

Mackey was admitted to the bar in Philadelphia in 1894. He served as the head football coach at Pennsylvania Military College, now Widener University, in 1894 compiling a 3-2 record, and at the University of Virginia in 1895, where his team went 9-2. His career win–loss record was 12–4.

== Political career ==
He clerked for two former judges after law school and entered into private practice in 1902. In 1905, he became the director of the Department of Public Health and Charities in the Weaver administration. He was active in the local Republican Party and won a seat in the lower house of the Philadelphia City Council, the Common Council. Mackey ran for the U.S. House of Representatives against Democrat James Washington Logue and Frederick S. Drake of the Washington Party, but finished third. Later, he served as the director of the Department of Public Works and chairman of the Pennsylvania Workmen's Compensation Board. In 1925, he won election as the city treasurer of Philadelphia.

Mackey was close to Republican Party political boss William Scott Vare and was his campaign manager in his 1926 campaign for the Senate. Vare defeated incumbent senator George W. Pepper and Gifford Pinchot in the Republican primary and William Bauchop Wilson in the general election but was not seated by the Senate after a three-year inquiry into campaign spending and vote fraud.

In 1927, Mackey ran in the 1927 Philadelphia mayoral election as the candidate of William Vare. His main opponent was J. Hampton Moore, a former mayor who ran under the banner of the Citizens Party. Mackey campaigned against the Kendrick administration charging corruption in the police force to the tune of hundreds of thousands monthly in illicit payoffs. On election day, Mackey defeated Moore by a large margin.

His position on prohibition changed during his term. His chief supporter, Vare, was "wet"; however, after his election, Mackey declared himself as a "dry" who was in favor of prohibition. Part of his initial program would include going after payoffs from saloon keepers and speakeasies. In 1930, delivered a speech that denounced prohibition, which local observers attributed to the mayor throwing his hat into the 1930 election for governor as a "wet" candidate.

By 1929, Mackey was supporting a rival electoral slate to Vare, which led to conflict between the factions.

Mackey was a vocal supporter of athletics in Philadelphia. Between at least 1932 and 1937, the winner of the annual Philadelphia Phillies-Philadelphia Athletics City Series was awarded the Mackey Cup in honor of the former mayor.

== Personal life ==
He was married to Ida (Boner) Mackey and had one daughter, Lorna.

Mackey died in 1938 in Philadelphia from pneumonia. He had been bedridden for two months after an automobile accident. He was interred at West Laurel Hill Cemetery in Bala Cynwyd, Pennsylvania.

== Head coaching record ==
Year	Team	Overall	Conference	Standing	Bowl/playoffs
Pennsylvania Military Cadets (Independent) (1894)
1894	Pennsylvania Military	3–2			
Pennsylvania Military:		3–2			
Virginia Orange and Blue (Independent) (1895)
1895	Virginia	9–2			
Virginia:		9–2			
Total:		12–4			

Political offices
Preceded by W. Freeland Kendrick	Mayor of Philadelphia; 1928–1932	Succeeded by J. Hampton Moore
