= Next Magazine (New York City) =

American gay lifestyle magazine

- First issue, July 1993
- Editor: Alexander Kacala
- Former editors: Jay Jimenez (Editor-in-Chief)
- Categories: LGBT culture
- Frequency: Weekly
- Circulation: 50,000
- Publisher: Kevin Hopper
- First issue: July 23, 1993
- Final issue: September 2016
- Company: Multimedia Platforms, Inc.
- Country: United States
- Based in: New York City
- Language: English
- Website: nextmagazine.com
- OCLC: 29806807

Next Magazine is a weekly gay lifestyle magazine that was published in New York City from July 1993 to September 2016. It addressed topics of fashion, life, entertainment, sex, and LGBT culture news, and was distributed freely in gay bars and other locations throughout Manhattan, Brooklyn, Queens, The Bronx, Long Island, and New Jersey.

== History ==
The first issue of Next Magazine "hit the streets of New York" on July 23, 1993. It was founded by co-publishers David Moyal and nightlife promoter John Blair in response to the gay sexual revolution happening in and around the West Village and Chelsea neighborhoods of Manhattan. Their first offices were located at the corner of Fifth Avenue and 20th Street.

On July 1, 2009, Next Magazine became the only free local glossy gay night life publication in New York City, following the closure of longtime rival The New York Blade. The last issue of Next Magazine appeared in September 2016 when Multimedia Platforms, Inc. ceased operations. The parent company Multimedia Platforms laid off all its employees including those of Next Magazine.

== See also ==
- LGBT culture in New York City
