= Smoked (Law & Order: Special Victims Unit) =

- Law & Order: Special Victims Unit episode
- Detective Benson (Hargitay) shocked, in the aftermath of the SVU squadroom shooting.
- Episode no.: Season 12; Episode 24
- Directed by: Helen Shaver
- Written by: Jonathan Greene; Daniel Truly
- Production code: 12024
- Original air date: May 18, 2011

Guest appearances
- Michael Raymond-James as Eddie Skinner; Pedro Pascal as Special Agent Greer; Hayley McFarland as Jenna Fox; Andrew Howard as Luke Ronson; Joe Grifasi as Hashi Horowitz; James Chen as CSU Tech Andy Sung; Francie Swift as Assistant District Attorney Sherri West; Charlayne Woodard as Sister Peg

Episode chronology
← Previous "Delinquent"	Next → "Scorched Earth"
- Law & Order: Special Victims Unit season 12

"Smoked" is the twelfth-season finale of the police procedural television series Law & Order: Special Victims Unit and the 272nd overall episode. It originally aired on NBC on May 18, 2011. In the episode, Detectives Elliot Stabler (Christopher Meloni), Olivia Benson (Mariska Hargitay), and Fin Tutuola (Ice-T) investigate the murder of a rape victim who was scheduled to testify in a high-profile rape case. After the suspects are arrested, the victim's daughter opens fire in the squad room, killing several people inside before Detective Stabler fatally shoots her.

The episode was written by Jonathan Greene and Daniel Truly and was directed by Helen Shaver. It marks the final appearance of leading co-star Christopher Meloni until the season 22 episode "Return of the Prodigal Son", and is also the last episode to feature BD Wong and Tamara Tunie in the opening credits; all three actors announced their departures from the series after the end of the season. The episode also marks the final appearance of Charlayne Woodard, who had portrayed Sister Peg on a recurring basis since 2002; her character is caught in the crossfire during the shooting and dies after sustaining a gunshot wound to the chest.

"Smoked" received mixed reviews from critics. According to Nielsen ratings, the episode's original broadcast was watched by 8.98 million viewers, making it the most watched program on NBC of the night and the most watched program in the 10:00 p.m. time slot.

== Plot ==
Days before the trial of accused rapist Luke Ronson (Andrew Howard), the prosecution's primary witness Annette Fox (Alice Barrett) is murdered while shopping with her daughter, Jenna (Hayley McFarland). Detectives Olivia Benson (Mariska Hargitay) and Elliot Stabler (Christopher Meloni) are called in to investigate the correlation between the murder and rape case and assure Jenna they will catch her mother's killer.

Ronson, now a volunteer barber at a homeless shelter run by Sister Peg (Charlayne Woodard), says the sex was consensual. The detectives search his house and find a gun and black hoodie similar to the one Fox's killer wore. However, owning an unloaded gun without a permit is a misdemeanor, not enough to keep Ronson in holding, and the gun does not match the murder weapon.

Stabler and Fin Tutuola (Ice-T) follow Luke to the shelter and watch him argue with a man, Eddie Skinner (Michael Raymond-James), who earlier said he saw Luke with a gun the night of the murder. When Skinner sees the detectives, he tries to run, but they arrest him. Ronson says he hired Skinner to scare Annette, not kill her, but Skinner says he and Ronson never agreed to that. Benson believes Ronson, but with no murder weapon, SVU has no case. ADA Sherri West (Francie Swift) charges Ronson with witness tampering and Skinner with assaulting a police officer. Later, ATF Agent Greer (Pedro Pascal) takes custody of Skinner because he is the key to busting a cigarette smuggling ring. Stabler goes undercover to bust the smuggling ring using Skinner as bait, but the paranoid smugglers suspect Stabler of being a cop and open fire on him; Skinner escapes during the chaos.

The detectives track Skinner to Ronson's apartment, where he holds Ronson at gunpoint demanding money. Stabler convinces Skinner to put the gun down and arrests both men. Skinner admits to killing Annette in exchange for a lesser murder charge, and tells detectives that he got the murder weapon from Greer. Greer is arrested as an accessory to murder and put in holding with Ronson and Skinner. Sister Peg visits the station to drop off a picture of Jenna and Annette with an address written in Skinner's handwriting.

The detectives call Jenna into the squad room so she can see the three men behind bars. She leaves, but surprises everyone by returning with a handgun and firing wildly into the holding cell, killing Ronson and Greer. As Benson pleads with Jenna to put the gun down, Stabler takes cover behind his desk and reaches for his weapon. Jenna fires two shots at them, hitting and killing Sister Peg with the first and taking out a window with the second. Shocked, she stops, but a provoking comment by Skinner infuriates her again. As she aims her gun at him, Stabler shoots her. As she lies on the floor, Jenna says she bought the gun off the street and it was easy before dying in Stabler's arms.

== Production ==
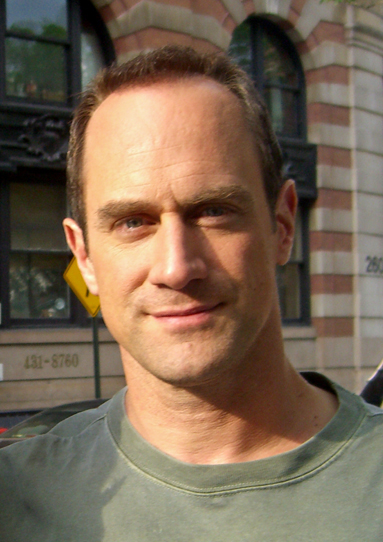
"Smoked" served as the final full-time appearance of Christopher Meloni (pictured) with the show, and his final appearance overall until the season 22 episode "Return of the Prodigal Son".

"Smoked" was written by Jonathan Grenee and Daniel Truly and was directed by Helen Shaver. It is the last episode produced under the direction of Neal Baer, who had been the showrunner since season two. Baer, who signed a three-year deal with CBS Television Studios in November 2011, was replaced by former Law & Order: Criminal Intent executive producer-showrunner Warren Leight.

Ten days after the episode's broadcast, Meloni left the show after his contract negotiations failed. BD Wong, who was absent from this episode, departed the cast as well to star on the NBC drama Awake. Wong later reprised his role in one episode each for the 13th, 14th, 15th and 17th seasons. A plan to have Hargitay only appear in 13 episodes of the next season was discussed but later retracted, as Hargitay then extended her contract through the 14th season.

Neal Baer told Michael Ausiello about the twelfth season finale, "We go out with a bang. It's my last episode for SVU — I'm leaving after 11 years to go to CBS — and it leaves us with a death; it leaves us with one of our beloved characters doing something that will change the way they see being a cop; and since I'm a [doctor], I get to rag on cigarettes, so that's terrific!" The month before, Ausiello hinted that there would be a fatality on the show. At the start of 2011 when SVU's future was unknown, Baer said of Hargitay and Meloni's status on returning with the show, "They're the longest running drama duo in TV history," Baer continues, "and I think [they'll be around] as long as they can keep playing new angles within the parameters of the show." And as the credits showed that Baer did not write "Smoked", he commented, "I don't have plans to write some farewell show,” he laughed. "It will just be a really good, twisty, turny and hopefully memorable episode."

Until "Smoked", actress Charlayne Woodard had not portrayed the Sister Peg character on Law & Order: Special Victims Unit since the eighth-season episode "Underbelly".

== Reception ==
=== Ratings ===
In its original broadcast on May 18, 2011, "Smoked" was viewed by 8.98 million viewers and acquired a 2.9 rating/7% share in the 18–49 demographic, meaning that it was seen by 2.9% of all 18- to 49-year-olds and 7% of 18- to 49-year-olds watching television at the time of the broadcast. Law & Order: Special Victims Unit was the highest rated program on NBC that night and the highest rated program in the 10:00 p.m. time slot, beating both Criminal Minds: Suspect Behavior on CBS and Happy Endings on ABC.

=== Critical response ===
Lucy Tonic of Yahoo said: "'Smoked' ends with chaos in the precinct, resulting from a literal smoking gun, yet it's unfortunate that writers tried to introduce the issue of America's gun problem within the last ten minutes of the episode. Sadly, the conclusion of Law & Order: SVU Season 12 was predictable and more dramatized than needed."
