= Return of the Prodigal Son (Law & Order: Special Victims Unit) =

- Law & Order: Special Victims Unit episode
- Episode no.: Season 22; Episode 9
- Directed by: Juan José Campanella
- Story by: Julie Martin; Warren Leight
- Production code: 220009
- Original air date: April 1, 2021

Guest appearances
- Christopher Meloni as Elliot Stabler; Isabel Gillies as Kathy Stabler

Episode chronology
← Previous "The Only Way Out Is Through"	Next → "Welcome to the Pedo Motel"
- Law & Order: Special Victims Unit season 22

"Return of the Prodigal Son" is the ninth episode of the 22nd season of Law & Order: Special Victims Unit. The episode aired on April 1, 2021, on NBC. It features the reintroduction of the character Elliot Stabler (Christopher Meloni), who had been written out of the series in the premiere episode of its 13th season, 10 years previously. The episode served as a precursor to the new series Law & Order: Organized Crime, of which Stabler is the main character. The episode was a two-part crossover event, which concluded with the Law & Order: Organized Crime premiere episode, "What Happens in Puglia".

The episode centers around Stabler reuniting with his former partner, Olivia Benson (Mariska Hargitay), after his wife Kathy (Isabel Gillies) is killed in a car bombing apparently meant for him.

== Plot ==
On her way to a dinner held in her honor, Captain Olivia Benson sees a badly injured Kathy Stabler being treated by ambulance EMTs, and her husband, Benson's former partner Elliot Stabler, tells her that someone bombed their rental car while they were en route to the dinner. Stabler, who resigned from SVU following the events of the episode "Smoked" 10 years earlier, has been living with his family in Rome, Italy, while working as the NYPD's liaison in Europe, specializing in organized crime; he believes that the mobsters he has been investigating were responsible for the bombing.

While waiting in the emergency room for news about Kathy, Benson and Stabler, who have not seen or heard from each other in a decade, have a quietly emotional conversation about Stabler's abrupt departure from SVU, which had a lasting effect on Benson. The emergency room doctor tells them that Kathy's condition is serious, but stable. Days later, however, her spleen ruptures during surgery, and she dies. Devastated, Stabler gathers his children together to mourn her.

Stabler becomes obsessed with finding Kathy's murderers, to the point that he repeatedly inserts himself into the investigation; Benson is forced to tell him to back down. He also confronts a group of jailed Albanian gangsters he believes to be responsible for Kathy's death and swears revenge.

== Production ==
On March 31, 2020, NBC announced that it had ordered a 13-episode series with Meloni reprising his role as Stabler in a then-untitled SVU spinoff, to be produced by Dick Wolf. Later announced as Law & Order: Organized Crime, the new series centers on an organized crime task force.

Meloni's spin-off was initially slated for a fall release; plans for the series, however, were delayed to 2021 as a result of the COVID-19 pandemic. As a result of this, plans for him to appear in the 22nd season premiere of Law & Order: Special Victims Unit were subsequently scrapped, the showrunner, Warren Leight, deciding to wait until the night of Meloni's spin-off new premiere date.

This episode was originally intended to be the season's seventh episode, but it was pushed back due to production of both the pilot episode of Law & Order: Organized Crime as well as this episode not being completed in time for the original airdate.

== Response ==
=== Ratings ===
"Return of the Prodigal Son" was watched by 8.03 million viewers, more than double the previous episode, and the most viewers for any episode of SVU since 2015, scoring a 1.7 rating/10 share among adults 18–49.

=== Reviews ===
"Return of the Prodigal Son" was well-received by critics.

Jack Ori of TV Fanatic praised the episode's focus on the renewed relationship between Benson and Stabler, especially the tension between them created by 10 years without contact. "This kind of story can be tricky to pull off. Fans have been eager for this reunion, but it wouldn't be realistic or great for Benson's character if she were 100% happy that Stabler was back and decided to forget that he'd disappeared," Ori wrote. "But SVU handled the dilemma perfectly, allowing Benson to go back and forth between falling into the old, comfortable relationship with Stabler and being reluctant to allow herself to go beyond being professional with him."

Kimberly Roots of TVLine praised the episode as "an exciting and emotionally messy ripping-open of the interpersonal mess left after El abruptly retired from the New York Police Department in Season 12".

Diane Gordon of TV Guide, in a review of both "Return of the Prodigal Son" and "What Happens in Puglia", praised Meloni's performance, but questioned whether the character had evolved during his 10-year absence. "Meloni is in solid form and easily slips back into the Stabler persona, but that persona is the same as it's always been. The real question the show will have to answer is: Is that a good thing? Both Stabler and Benson admit that times have changed, but they also write off a lot of his former mistakes as signs of his passion, so it's not clear how much the new series will force him to evolve."
