= Law & Order: Special Victims Unit season 7 =

Season of American television series

Law & Order: Special Victims Unit
- Season 7
- Season 7 U.S. DVD cover
- Starring: Christopher Meloni; Mariska Hargitay; Richard Belzer; Diane Neal; Ice-T; BD Wong; Tamara Tunie; Dann Florek
- No. of episodes: 22

Release
- Original network: NBC
- Original release: September 20, 2005 – May 16, 2006

Season chronology
- ← Previous; Season 6 Next → Season 8

The seventh season of the television series, Law & Order: Special Victims Unit premiered September 20, 2005 and ended May 16, 2006 on NBC. It aired on Tuesday nights at 10pm/9c. Critically the show's most successful season, both lead actors received nominations at the 58th Primetime Emmy Awards with a win by Mariska Hargitay.

== Production ==
Repeating a pattern established by other SVU seasons, the Season 7 premiere was filmed before the airing of the Season 6 finale. Long-time SVU co-executive producers, Michele Fazekas, Tara Butters, and Lisa Marie Petersen departed the series at the end of Season 7. Additionally, long-time Law & Order franchise director Constantine Makris departed until his return in the twelfth season.

Mariska Hargitay won the Primetime Emmy Award for Outstanding Lead Actress in a Drama Series for her performance in the episode "911". This made her the first regular cast member of any Law & Order series to win an Emmy. Christopher Meloni was nominated for the Primetime Emmy Award for Outstanding Lead Actor in a Drama Series, his first Emmy nomination. Meloni was water skiing when the 2006 Emmy nominations were announced. He received a congratulatory call from showrunner Neal Baer and responded with "Cool! I'm going back to ski." Meloni's nomination was apparently for the episode "Ripped". The Envelope section of the Los Angeles Times reported that SVU also made a bid for Ted Kotcheff to receive the Primetime Emmy Award for Outstanding Directing for a Drama Series, but he was not selected as a nominee.

== Cast changes and returning characters ==
Tamara Tunie, after five seasons playing recurring medical examiner, Dr. Melinda Warner, was added to the opening credits. Judith Light, who had played Bureau Chief ADA Elizabeth Donnelly in seasons three, four and six, returned for the seventh season but with her character acting as a judge. The seventh was the first season not to have an appearance by Isabel Gillies as Kathy Stabler. This is because the actress was in Ohio, working on her marriage.

Dr. Rebecca Hendrix, the recurring character from the previous season, was brought back for the episode "Ripped". Played by Mary Stuart Masterson, she helps Detective Stabler come to terms with unresolved issues in what Neal Baer called "an emotionally devastating scene". In addition, the guest star Ernest Waddell from the previous season had his character, Ken Randall, further explored in the episodes "Strain" and "Venom".

Season 7 was Fred Thompson's last season on SVU even though he continued to play DA Arthur Branch on Law & Order for another year. Diane Neal gave an interview about working with him during the seventh season. She compared him to her father, who is a federal attorney, saying: "They're both southern, they're both large, they're both lawyers, they're both the same age, they're both football kind of guys."

== Cast ==
=== Main ===
- Christopher Meloni as Senior Detective Elliot Stabler
- Mariska Hargitay as Junior Detective Olivia Benson
- Richard Belzer as Senior Detective John Munch
- Diane Neal as Assistant District Attorney Casey Novak
- Ice-T as Junior Detective Odafin "Fin" Tutuola
- BD Wong as FBI Special Agent Dr. George Huang
- Tamara Tunie as Medical Examiner Dr. Melinda Warner
- Dann Florek as Captain Donald "Don" Cragen

=== Crossover stars from Law & Order ===
- Fred Dalton Thompson as District Attorney Arthur Branch

=== Recurring ===
- Ian Bedford as Officer Bamford
- Caren Browning as Crime Scene Unit Captain Judith Siper
- William H. Burns as Officer Robbins
- John Cullum as Defense Attorney Barry Moredock
- Mike Doyle as Crime Scene Technician Ryan O'Halloran
- Ned Eisenberg as Defense Attorney Roger Kressler
- Joel de la Fuente as Technical Assistance Response Unit Technician Ruben Morales
- Paula Garcés as Crime Scene Unit Forensics Technician Millie Vizcarrondo
- Donnetta Lavinia Grays as Officer Ramirez
- Stephen Gregory as Dr. Kyle Beresford
- Joe Grifasi as Defense Attorney Hahsi Horowitz
- Francis Jue as Dr. Fong
- Patricia Kalember as Judge Karen Taten
- Jill Marie Lawrence as Defense Attorney Cleo Conrad
- Judith Light as Judge Elizabeth Donnelly
- Joe Lisi as Parole Officer Craig Lennon
- Peter McRobbie as Judge Walter Bradley
- Joanna Merlin as Judge Lena Petrovsky
- Joseph E. Murray as Emergency Medical Technician Olson
- Audrie J. Neenan as Judge Lois Preston
- J. Paul Nicholas as Defense Attorney Linden Delroy
- Tom O'Rourke as Judge Mark Seligman
- Annie Potts as Defense Attorney Sophie Devere
- Joselin Reyes as Paramedic Martinez
- Peter Riegert as Defense Attorney Chauncey Zeirko
- David Thornton as Defense Attorney Lionel Granger
- Ernest Waddell as Ken Randall

=== Guest stars ===
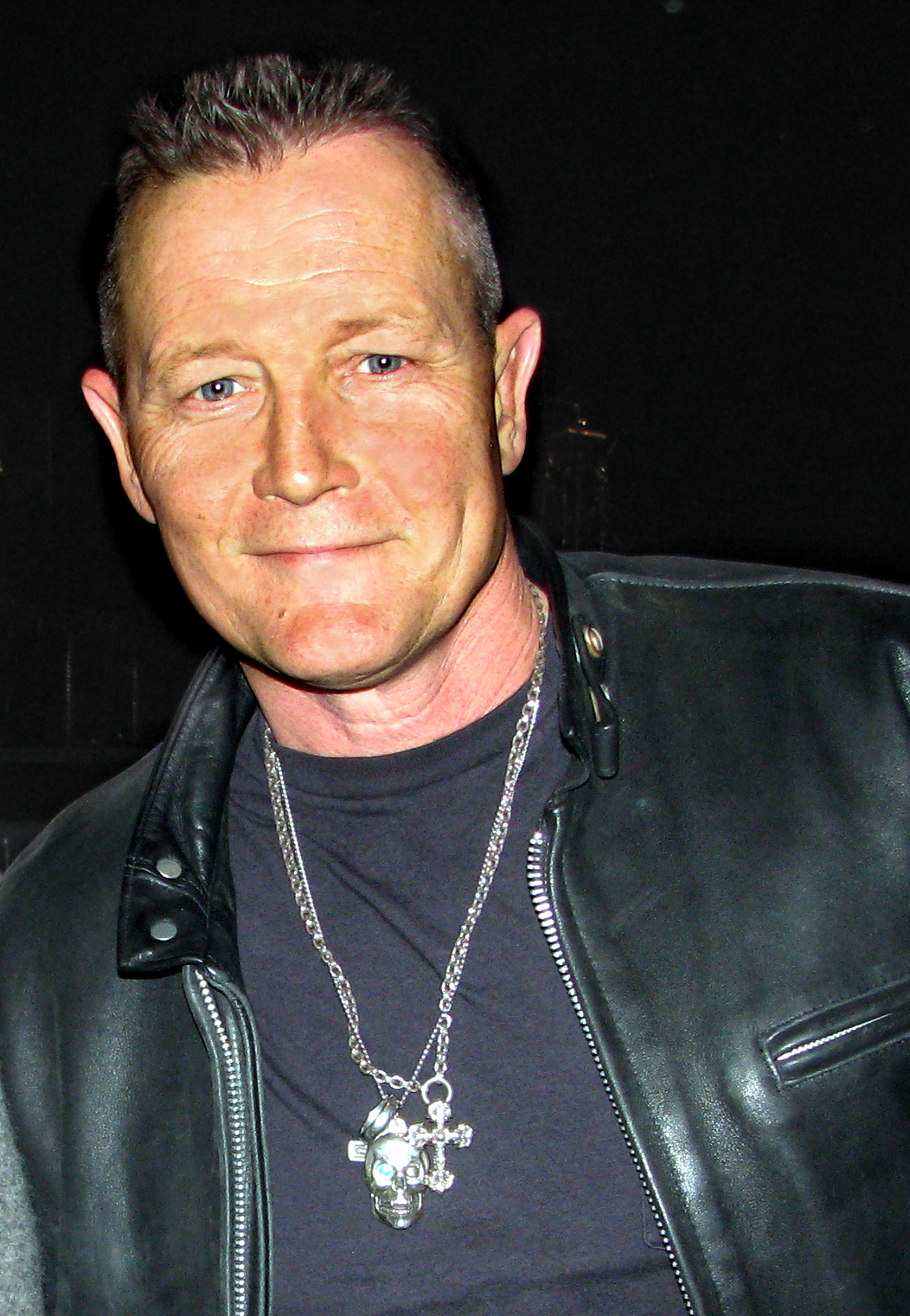
Robert Patrick plays Ray Schenkel, a suspected (but not proven) rapist in "Demons."

The season premiere "Demons" showed Christopher Meloni sharing psychologically intense scenes with Terminator 2: Judgment Day star Robert Patrick. In an interview, Meloni explained that the two met for the first time and became good friends during the shooting of "Demons", saying: "Every once in a while, you'll get a great actor who for whatever reason, you'll speak the same language." The second episode "Design" was a crossover with the Law & Order episode "Flaw". Estella Warren and Lynda Carter starred in the episode as a mother-daughter pair of con-artists. When discussing her role, Carter said: "Having so often been the heroine, I thoroughly enjoyed playing a grifter and exploring some of the darker aspects of human nature." In the same episode, one of their marks was played by Bobby Flay, the then-husband of former SVU star Stephanie March.

The sixth episode "Raw" featured Marcia Gay Harden playing an undercover agent. Her character is initially believed to be a white-supremacist named Star Morrison and is later revealed to be Dana Lewis of the FBI. Harden would go on to play the character thrice more in SVU. In the following episode "Name", detectives investigate a perpetrator played by Richard Bright. This episode was the last of Richard Bright's works that was released before his death in 2006. Dean Cain starred in the eighth episode "Starved" as what Neal Baer called "a very handsome guy who may or may not be involved in a series of serial rapes".

Keri Lynn Pratt guest starred in the episode "Rockabye" as a teenage mother who self-aborts. In a 2012 interview, shortly after he departed as the SVU showrunner, Neal Baer recalled: "I just loved doing shows on SVU that raised these really tough trenchant issues. Could we still do those? SVU is still on. Could we still do a show about a teen access to abortion? I'm not sure." In the eleventh episode "Alien", Raquel Castro played the child of a lesbian couple named Emma. When one of her mothers dies, she lies about being sexually abused as part of her grandmother's petition for custody. Graduate student Morgan Blue analyzed this episode and wrote: "By the end of this episode, it's clear that the detectives believed Emma was innocent, but were not taken in by the 'myth of a spotlessly honest child.'" The episode "Infected" guest starred Malcolm David Kelley as a child who witnesses gun violence and goes on to commit it himself. His appearance on the NBC program was promoted by emphasizing his breakout role on Lost. A report by AOL TV noted this unusual move of referring to another network's show.

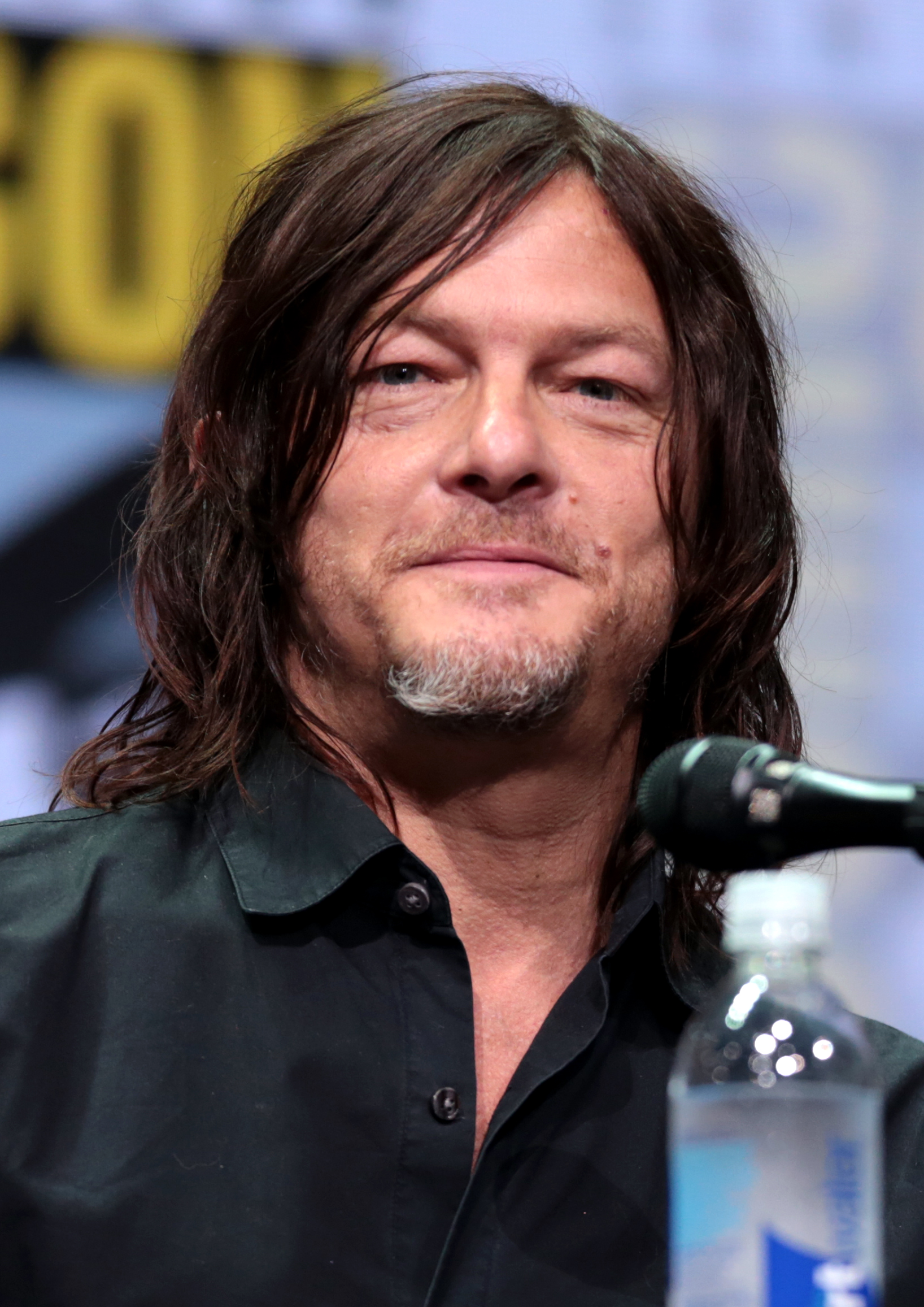
Norman Reedus played celebrity Derek Lord in "Influence", who pays for the defense of a bipolar girl who refuses medication.

In "Taboo", Schuyler Fisk guest starred as a young mother who has abandoned at least two babies in order to cover up incest. This was one of the more memorable roles for the actress according to a 2011 interview in which she said: "When I did Law & Order: SVU, Mariska Hargitay was particularly good to me and I actually enjoyed diving into a dark place for that character." The sixteenth episode "Gone" showed three teenage boys on trial for the murder of a teenage girl whose body was never found. Susan Saint James guest starred as their attorney, marking her first television role in ten years. Saint James stated in an interview that she was eager to play a Law & Order part and would have played a judge if it had been up to her. The same interview revealed that she was a long-time fan of SVU having watched "almost every episode multiple times." Another Season 7 guest star who mentioned being a fan of the program was Chris "Ludacris" Bridges who said: "Once you start watching a television show that you love you can't stop watching it." Ludacris guest starred in "Venom" as Darius Parker, a member of Fin Tutuola's family with a dark past and a complicated relationship with Fin's son. This role united Ludacris with fellow rapper Ice-T. When being interviewed, Bridges joked: "No, we don't rap on the SVU set. It's all about acting."

The episode "Fault" featured what Neal Baer called "an unusual and forceful performance from Lou Diamond Phillips". Phillips, who was a fan of the program already, played Victor Paul Gitano, a recently released sex offender who kidnaps two children and puts Detectives Benson and Stabler in a situation where their partnership is pushed to its limits. "Fault" has been named one of Hargitay's favorite episodes multiple times. In the episode "Fat", Anthony Anderson portrayed Detective Lucius Blaine, Stabler's temporary partner. Anderson would go on to portray Detective Kevin Bernard on the original Law & Order series from 2008 to 2022. The following episode "Web" showed Connor Paolo return to the series after guest starring as a different character in the fourth season. Brittany Snow concluded the season by playing an impressionable teen with bipolar disorder in "Influence".

== Episodes ==
Law & Order: Special Victims Unit season 7 episodes
No. overall	No. in season	Title	Directed by	Written by	Original release date	Prod. code	U.S. viewers (millions)
140	1	"Demons"	David Platt	Amanda Green	September 20, 2005	0704	16.82
Twenty years after being convicted of the rape of a teenage girl, Ray Schenkel (Robert Patrick) is released from prison, much to the dismay of a retired detective (Robert Walden). When a teenage girl (Brittany Underwood) is raped on the route Schenkel would have taken home, Stabler goes undercover as a recently paroled sex offender so that he can get into the group with the same therapist (Jim Moody) as Schenkel, and the same halfway house. Cragen worries that Stabler may be getting in over his head.
141	2	"Design"	David Platt	Lisa Marie Petersen	September 27, 2005	0701	15.32
Benson brings a pregnant woman (Estella Warren) down from a rooftop, who claims to be a rape victim who contemplated suicide. When the unit charges her alleged attacker and the father of the baby (Julian Sands), she appears to perish in an explosion. After finding other men (Bobby Flay, Mark McGrath, and Jesse Palmer) who slept with her despite having no recollection of it, the detectives realize that the woman, very much still alive, is a con artist and a rapist herself who drugs men and steals their sperm (via electroejaculation), following the eugenics plan of her father (Ronny Cox) to produce a baby with successful genes. With the help of her mother (Lynda Carter), she hides the baby until the court agrees not to give her jail time.: This episode begins a story that concludes on Law & Order in "Flaw."
142	3	"911"	Ted Kotcheff	Patrick Harbinson	October 4, 2005	0707	16.24
Benson is on her way to an evening date when a 911 call comes in from a little girl named Maria Recinos (Jeanine Monterroza (voice) and Rachel Diaz-Stand), who says she is all alone in a locked room. While trying to draw the girl out and keep her on the line, Benson is drawn deeper into her life. The team begins to suspect that the whole thing is some sick joke but Benson is convinced that Maria is telling the truth, and she is able to ferret enough information to get a place to start but Maria's captor (Christopher Evan Welch) has done everything he can to make sure that no one can find the girl he bought and paid for.
143	4	"Ripped"	Rick Wallace	Jonathan Greene	October 11, 2005	0703	14.88
When the teenage son (Paul Wesley) of Stabler's old partner (Noah Emmerich) comes under suspicion for attacking a classmate, Stabler is caught between his boss, who thinks he is cutting the kid too many breaks, and his friend, who thinks he is not doing enough to help. Stabler seeks counseling from another friend (Mary Stuart Masterson) when the case starts to bring out the worst in him.
144	5	"Strain"	Constantine Makris	Robert Nathan	October 18, 2005	0705	14.36
Police discover the bodies of two young gay men who were both methamphetamine addicts as well as victims of a new strain of HIV that can kill its victims in less than a year. Tutuola learns that his son Ken (Ernest Waddell) is gay, and has difficulty accepting it. Ken helps Benson and Tutuola infiltrate an anti-meth group and they learn that the leader (Brian Bloom) killed people who were spreading the virus. The father (Bill Smitrovich) of one of the victims realizes that this crime saved lives and asks that it be punished with a lenient sentence.
145	6	"Raw"	Jonathan Kaplan	Dawn DeNoon	November 1, 2005	0708	15.20
A six-year-old black boy who was adopted by white parents (Myk Watford and Marin Hinkle) is killed in a school shooting. When detectives trace the rifle used back to a gun shop, Munch and Tutuola face hatred from a neo-Nazi group using the shop as its headquarters. The group consists of a white supremacist (J. C. MacKenzie), his son (Cody Kasch) and a woman (Marcia Gay Harden) who is not what she appears to be. When detectives arrest the shooter (Joel Marsh Garland) and put him on the witness stand, the group retaliates by starting a shootout in the courtroom that claims the life of a judge (John Rubinstein).
146	7	"Name"	David Platt	Michele Fazekas	November 8, 2005	0706	15.76
After the bones of a boy who disappeared in 1978 are found at a playground, Stabler, still visibly recovering from a recent gunshot wound, teams up with a CSU technician (Paula Garcés) who is taking the case personally. When a woman (Lisa Emery) comes forward, claiming that the boy was her brother, they reopen a cold case involving three murdered Puerto Rican boys in which the prime suspect (Richard Bright) worked with an accomplice (Ruben Santiago-Hudson).
147	8	"Starved"	David Platt	Lisa Marie Petersen	November 15, 2005	0709	15.73
After a dating service is linked to the rapes of three women (Kelly Miller, Ivy Omére and Virginia Leung), Olivia goes undercover to ferret out the rapist and meets a surgeon (Dean Cain) who enjoys controlling the women in his life. The detectives are soon led to his girlfriend (Tina Holmes) but she is manipulated into attempting suicide which leaves her in a vegetative state. A legal battle between a convicted rapist and his girlfriend's mother (Veronica Cartwright) ensues over whether the feeding tube should be removed.: Special appearance by Fred Thompson as DA Arthur Branch.
148	9	"Rockabye"	Peter Leto	Patrick Harbinson	November 22, 2005	0710	17.08
A sixteen-year-old (Keri Lynn Pratt) loses her unborn child due to a severe abdominal beating. Her father (Skipp Sudduth) insists that she must have been raped and this leads detectives to the baby's father (John Patrick Amedori). The squad later learns that the girl was an active party in her own beating and that the teens found it necessary to do this after a fake abortion clinic deliberately stalled for time.: Special appearance by Fred Thompson as DA Arthur Branch.
149	10	"Storm"	David Platt	Neal Baer & Amanda Green	November 29, 2005	0711	17.54
A teenager (Keke Palmer) and her baby sister end up in the hospital after a day at the park. Detectives learn that both girls were abducted from New Orleans by a pedophile after Hurricane Katrina along with a third sister (Nickayla Tucker) who is still missing. Despite the interference of a local reporter (Matthew Settle), the detectives are able to catch the kidnapper (Russell Hornsby) and recover the girl. However, when he dies unexpectedly and the lab discovers the cause was anthrax poisoning, it is revealed that he was involved with a man (Leo Marks) who stole anthrax from a laboratory in New Orleans during the hurricane. Benson tries to inform the public about this and puts her job at risk.
150	11	"Alien"	Constantine Makris	José Molina	December 6, 2005	0702	16.30
A school boy (Daniel Manche) becomes paralyzed after being stabbed in the back and detectives learn that the alleged perpetrator (Sasha Neulinger) was trying to protect his half-sister (Raquel Castro). While attending a Catholic school, the girl had been tormented continuously for having two mothers. One of her guardians (Amy Pietz) who never legally adopted her, is accused of sexual molestation by the girl's biological grandparents (Edmund Genest and Mary Beth Peil). While trying to decide if the claims are real or frivolous, Novak begins to suspect that their lawyer (Stephen Bogardus) is committing perjury.
151	12	"Infected"	Michelle MacLaren	Michele Fazekas & Tara Butters	January 3, 2006	0712	15.22
A single mother (April Nixon) is found dead in her apartment with her son (Malcolm David Kelley) hiding in the closet behind her body. The squad is able to link the woman's death to a philanthropist (Gordon Clapp) whose organization helps people get off the street. Detective Benson befriends the traumatized boy and tries to have him ID his mother's killer in a lineup. However, he IDs the wrong man and goes out of his way to make up for this by killing the suspect himself. A high profile case develops around charging a child with murder and his defense argues that his exposure to gun violence conditioned him to kill. Afraid of the precedent this could set, a firearms lobby group files a civil suit. A clever legal maneuver by Judge Donnelly (Judith Light) gets the orphan acquitted of the murder charge and into foster care.
152	13	"Blast"	Peter Leto	Amanda Green	January 10, 2006	0713	14.72
The team begins a search when a girl (Gabrielle Brennan) is kidnapped while walking home from school. While processing evidence found at the scene, Warner realizes that the little girl has leukemia and needs treatment as soon as possible. The detectives are able to find her after a botched ransom drop but they learn that the kidnapper (Shawn Reaves), a drug addict desperate for cash, is the girl's brother. Stabler and Warner become hostages when he holds up a bank to strike back at his parents (Tom Verica and Kaitlin Hopkins). Before he gets himself killed by the ESU, Warner shoots him in the leg, allowing him to be taken alive.
153	14	"Taboo"	Arthur W. Forney	Dawn DeNoon	January 17, 2006	0714	16.10
A college student (Schuyler Fisk)'s tale of rape and an unknown pregnancy becomes suspicious to the detectives when they learn that she has been linked to not one, but two abandoned newborns. A paternity test later reveals that her abandoned child was the result of incestuous relationship with her father (Željko Ivanek), who is a local politician married to another woman (Alexandra Neil).
154	15	"Manipulated"	Matt Earl Beesley	José Molina	February 7, 2006	0715	15.24
The body of a young woman is found and when Benson and Stabler delve into her private life, they learn that in addition to being a respected lawyer, she was also a stripper. Her co-worker at the club (Faina Vitebsky) is later found murdered as well. Surveillance footage and DNA evidence implicate the lawyer's boss (Chris Potter) who appears to live with a disabled wife (Rebecca De Mornay). Further investigation reveals that the wife is living a lie and that she exacts revenge on her husband by hiring a hitman (Holt McCallany) to kill his sexual partners.
155	16	"Gone"	George Pattison	Jonathan Greene	February 28, 2006	0716	13.83
Three students are charged with rape and murder in the disappearance of a teenage Canadian girl (Barbara King) who took a trip to Manhattan. Under questioning, two of them (Teddy Ick and Paul David Story) point the finger at the younger and more gentle suspect (Harry Zittel). Novak discovers that he is being set up and promises to protect him from the other two. Despite this he disappears after the indictment. With no body and only one witness left (Sandor Tecsy) who is in no shape to testify, the boys are released. After following disturbing evidence, which includes a bug in the office of Judge Donnelly (Judith Light) planted by a corrupt court officer (Maggie Siff), the detectives arrest the two predators for the murder of their scapegoat.: Featuring Fred Thompson as DA Arthur Branch, in his final series appearance.
156	17	"Class"	Aaron Lipstadt	Paul Grellong	March 21, 2006	0717	13.48
When a college girl (Tess Soltau)'s body is dumped in an area frequented by prostitutes, Stabler and Tutuola realize she had far more money than a student on financial aid should, and they learn that she was deeply involved in the world of online gambling and high-stakes poker. Suspects include the victim's roommate (Trieste Kelly Dunn) who is seen wearing an expensive ring, an athlete (Mathew St. Patrick) from whom the ring was stolen and the victim's childhood friend (Will Estes). Stabler makes a special plea for the latter when stories of the young man's childhood are reminiscent of Stabler's own.
157	18	"Venom"	Peter Leto	Judith McCreary	March 28, 2006	0719	14.24
Tutuola's son Ken Randall (Ernest Waddell) calls Benson for help after he is picked up in an alley late at night. He claims that he was looking for a corpse after overhearing a man talk about murdering a woman and dumping her body. Although Tutuola and his ex-wife (LisaGay Hamilton) are sure that Ken is not a killer, they are puzzled about why he refuses to take a DNA test. Tutuola suspects that this has something to do with Ken's cousin, Darius Parker (Chris "Ludacris" Bridges) who has a long criminal record. When Ken eventually submits his DNA, it reveals a shocking family connection. Darius confesses to having murdered the woman and her baby but he is clever enough to get this confession thrown out. He vows revenge upon the family that has been humiliating him for his entire life.
158	19	"Fault"	Paul McCrane	Michele Fazekas & Tara Butters	April 4, 2006	0718	15.36
A manhunt ensues when Victor Paul Gitano (Lou Diamond Phillips), a recently released sex offender, kidnaps two children (Steven Hinkle and Tristen Douglass) after killing the rest of their family. Benson and Stabler pursue Gitano only to find their own relationship challenged as both experience opportunities where they put their personal relationship ahead of their jobs. The partners are able to save one of the children but Benson requests a new partner, feeling that they have become too close.
159	20	"Fat"	Juan J. Campanella	Patrick Harbinson	May 2, 2006	0721	15.27
With Benson transferred to the Computer Crimes Unit, Stabler is temporarily partnered with Detective Lucius Blaine (Anthony Anderson). Blaine is first to arrive on the scene of a girl (Rooney Mara) who was brutally assaulted by two overweight teenage culprits (Wallace Little and Shahidah McIntosh). The suspects are later discovered to be the siblings of an older brother (Omar Benson Miller) who has diabetes and needs a wheelchair. The detectives find out that the victim and her friend (Billy Wheelan) were victimizing obese people and had surprising motives for doing so.
160	21	"Web"	Peter Leto	Paul Grellong	May 9, 2006	0722	12.88
An eight-year-old boy (Jack Vignone) propositions a male classmate. When Stabler and Tutuola are called in, they learn that the boy's older brother (Connor Paolo) was molested by their father (Tim Hopper). DNA tests reveal that a pattern of abuse has infected the family with the older brother running his own pornography site. The webmaster goes missing and Ruben Morales (Joel de la Fuente) joins the detectives in their search. His own guilt about his nephew's rape by an online predator colors his judgment when dealing with one of the suspects.
161	22	"Influence"	Norberto Barba	Ian Biederman	May 16, 2006	0720	12.97
A teenage girl (Brittany Snow) falsely accuses two classmates (John Sutherland and Brandon Gill) of rape, makes advances on a third (Zachary Booth), and hits seven pedestrians in a car crash, killing one. Medical tests reveal that she recently stopped taking her medication for bipolar disorder. Her parents (Jeff McCarthy and Marsha Dietlein) agree to put her back on medication, but a rock star (Norman Reedus) known for his negative views on psychiatry campaigns for her right to refuse.
