= Scorched Earth (Law & Order: Special Victims Unit) =

- Law & Order: Special Victims Unit episode
- Episode no.: Season 13; Episode 1
- Directed by: Michael Slovis
- Written by: David Matthews
- Production code: 13003
- Original air date: September 21, 2011

Guest appearances
- Kathleen Garrett as Sophie DiStasio; Anika Noni Rose as Miriam Deng; Ron Rifkin as Marvin Exley; Tamara Tunie as Melinda Warner; Franco Nero as Roberto DiStasio; Stephanie March as Alexandra Cabot; Linus Roache as Michael Cutter

Episode chronology
← Previous "Smoked"	Next → "Personal Fouls"
- Law & Order: Special Victims Unit season 13

"Scorched Earth" is the thirteenth season premiere of the police procedural television series Law & Order: Special Victims Unit and the 273rd episode overall. It originally aired on NBC in the United States on September 21, 2011. In the episode, which was inspired by the Dominique Strauss-Kahn sexual assault case, an Italian diplomat is arrested when a hotel maid accuses him of rape. The District Attorney's office then brings the case to trial, which becomes increasingly complicated as the defense questions the maid's credibility. Meanwhile, Detective Olivia Benson (Mariska Hargitay) struggles to cope with the aftermath of the squad room shooting.

The episode was written by David Matthews and was directed by Michael Slovis. It is the first episode to air since Christopher Meloni left the series as leading costar, and marks the first appearance of Kelli Giddish as Amanda Rollins, who was added to the main cast alongside Danny Pino in June 2011 following Meloni's departure. The episode featured guest appearances from Franco Nero, Stephanie March, and Linus Roache, who reprised his role as Michael Cutter from Law & Order. "Scorched Earth" received mostly positive reviews, though the cast changes received mixed reactions. According to Nielsen ratings, the episode's original broadcast was watched by 7.63 million viewers.

== Plot ==
Hotel maid Miriam Deng (Anika Noni Rose) accuses an Italian diplomat, Roberto DiStasio (Franco Nero), of raping her. While Detective Benson (Mariska Hargitay) interviews Deng at the hospital, Detective Amanda Rollins (Kelli Giddish), who has recently transferred from the Atlanta Police Department, finds enough evidence of the assault in Mr. DiStasio's hotel room. Sergeant Munch (Richard Belzer) and Detective Tutuola (Ice-T) then race to the airport to arrest him before his plane departs for Italy.

DiStasio quickly hires lawyer Marvin Exley (Ron Rifkin) and claims diplomatic immunity. After Deng positively identifies DiStasio from the lineup, Tutuola and Benson take him to Dr. Warner's (Tamara Tunie) office for a forensic exam. The results confirm that his DNA matches that recovered from the crime scene. Benson and Assistant District Attorney Alexandra Cabot (Stephanie March) then warn Deng that DiStasio's defense team will claim in court that she fabricated the accusation for monetary reasons and ask her if she has been completely truthful; she replies that she has been. Later, the police and prosecution learn of a tape recording of Deng in which she admits that she could get a lot of money from DiStasio for assaulting her, weakening her credibility. However, Deng does not retract her accusation and insists that she was raped by DiStasio.

During the trial, the defense presents evidence that Deng was convicted of prostitution two years ago. Deng denies the charge and says she had been gang-raped by the soldiers who killed her husband. Deng's credibility weakens further when the defense presents a surprise witness, Daniel Achok, who testifies that he had advised her to fabricate the gang rape on her application for political asylum. The jury reached verdicts on two of the three charges, finding DiStasio guilty of unlawful imprisonment and not guilty of assault but deadlocks on the rape charge, and Benson says that he will likely serve a year in prison.

Meanwhile, Benson anxiously awaits for the return of Detective Stabler (Christopher Meloni), who was put on administrative leave after the squad room shooting. After noticing two detectives from the Internal Affairs Board in the squad room, Benson reminds Captain Donald Cragen (Dann Florek) that the shooting was justified. However, Cragen tells Benson that Stabler will have to submit to a psychiatric exam before he can return to work, having been involved in five prior shootings. At the end, Cragen informs her that Stabler has filed his retirement papers, leaving the NYPD for good. Stunned, Benson leaves for the interrogation room and breaks down in tears.

== Production ==
"Scorched Earth" was written by David Matthews and was directed by Michael Slovis. It is the first episode produced under the direction of Warren Leight, who replaced Neal Baer as showrunner after the twelfth season. It is also the first episode of the series without leading costar Christopher Meloni, who left the cast in May 2011 after the negotiations for his new contract failed. In June 2011, Kelli Giddish and Danny Pino were subsequently added to the cast as Detectives Amanda Rollins and Nick Amaro, respectively. While this episode marks the debut of Giddish's character, Pino's character is not introduced until the next episode. In August 2011, it was announced that Linus Roache would reprise his role as Michael Cutter from the original Law & Order.

The episode was inspired by the Dominique Strauss-Kahn arrest. Strauss-Kahn, who was head of the International Monetary Fund (IMF) and considered the front-runner in the French presidential election, was accused of sexually assaulting a maid at a midtown Manhattan hotel in May 2011. He pleaded not guilty to all charges, but quit his IMF post, and his presidential candidacy was sidetracked. Subsequently, the case against him weakened as prosecutors said his accuser admitted to lying to a grand jury about events surrounding the attack. Franco Nero portrays a Strauss-Kahn like character, Roberto DiStasio, but he is an Italian dignitary. Ron Rifkin plays DiStasio's defense attorney, who is similar to Strauss-Kahn's real life attorney, Benjamin Brafman.

New showrunner Warren Leight said of the incident's inspiration for this episode, "In this case, I don't believe we ripped from the headlines. I believe the actual story ripped us off." While the real life case's twists and turns made for tantalizing headline news, it wound up being "quite annoying," Leight said. "We had to do rewrites. Everything we had in our initial draft had to be changed." He joked that the story was so fast-moving that they worried the final scenes would have to be shot live on the day the episode airs. However, he noted, "It's still 'SVU', the shows are still emotionally driven and loaded."

== Reception ==
=== Ratings ===
In its original broadcast on September 21, 2011, "Scorched Earth" was watched by 7.63 million viewers and acquired a 2.4 rating/6% share in the 18–49 demographic, meaning that it was seen by 2.4% of all 18- to 49-year-olds and 6% of 18- to 49-year-olds watching television at the time of the broadcast. This was a decrease in ratings compared to the season 12 premiere, which was watched by 9.68 million viewers. Though Law & Order: Special Victims Unit came in third in its timeslot behind CSI: Crime Scene Investigation and Revenge, it was the most-watched program on NBC that night.

=== Reviews ===
Reviews of the plot were generally positive. Mike Hale of The New York Times described the episode as "taut, restrained and well acted", as well as "interesting for its extremely close tracking of the Strauss-Kahn case," and felt that the verdict was "disappointing in dramatic terms but understandable." TVfanatic.com gave the episode a 3.5/5 rating, calling the episode "your typical SVU fare", but felt that the episode was missing its typical argument between two of the detectives, as they "provided their own perspectives on the issue and they usually represent the division in the show's audience's members." The site also felt that the crime was a little too current; the episode's original broadcast was only a month after the charges against Strauss-Kahn were dismissed.

The cast changes were met with mixed reviews. Mike Hale felt that the departure of Christopher Meloni was a relief to the show, as his "tightly wound" character had a "wack-a-doodle intensity [that] had taken 'SVU' way off track", but still found it hard to imagine the show without him. He said that Meloni's absence turned the episode "into the best showcase his partner, Olivia, had been given in years." He called the addition of Michael Cutter was "a big gain" for the show, but felt uncertain about the addition of Detective Rollins, writing: "A scene in which she tried to sweet-talk information out of a jailed suspect was the one really weak moment in the episode." TVfanatic.com also had mixed feeling about Detective Rollins, who is supposed to breathe new life into the series, but wrote that Rollins may end up becoming an interesting character.
