= Elliot Stabler =

Fictional character on Law & Order: Special Victims Unit

- Law & Order franchise (Law & Order: Special Victims Unit and Law & Order: Organized Crime) character
- Christopher Meloni as Elliot Stabler (S9E1)
- First appearance: "Payback" (SVU) "What Happens in Puglia" (OC)
- Last appearance: "Obedience" (SVU)
- Portrayed by: Christopher Meloni; James Lynch (young)

In-universe information
- Title: NYPD Detective 1st Grade
- Family: Joseph Stabler (father, deceased); Bernadette Stabler (mother); Joe Stabler Jr. (brother, deceased); Randall Stabler (brother); Unnamed Brother; Dee (sister); Sharon (sister)
- Spouses: Kathy Stabler (deceased)
- Children: Maureen Stabler; Kathleen Stabler; Richard "Dickie" Stabler; Elizabeth "Lizzie" Stabler; Elliot "Eli" Stabler Jr.
- Religion: Roman Catholicism
- Partner: Olivia Benson (1998–2011); Donald Cragen; Lucius Blaine (temporary); Danielle Beck (2006); Ayanna Bell
- Seasons: L&O: 10, 22; SVU: 1, 2, 3, 4, 5, 6, 7, 8, 9, 10, 11, 12, 22, 23, 24, 26, 27, 28; TBJ: 1 OC: 1, 2, 3, 4, 5

Elliot Stabler Sr. is a fictional character, played by Christopher Meloni and one of the lead characters on the NBC police procedural series Law & Order: Special Victims Unit and Law & Order: Organized Crime.

Stabler was a main character for the first 12 seasons of Law & Order: Special Victims Unit. As a result of Meloni's sudden departure from the cast at the end of the show's twelfth season, Stabler abruptly retired from the police force off-screen. Meloni later reprised the role on the spin-off series Law & Order: Organized Crime.

== Synopsis ==
Stabler was an NYPD detective 1st Grade with Manhattan's Special Victims Unit, which investigates sex crimes. He joined the NYPD in 1986 and was promoted to detective in 1989. In show continuity, Stabler became a detective with SVU in 1992. By 1998, Stabler held the prestigious rank of Detective First Grade and was assigned to mentor his new partner, Detective Olivia Benson (Mariska Hargitay), a police officer with six years of experience who was transferred to the SVU as a newly promoted detective. The first episode of Special Victims Unit takes place one year into Stabler and Benson's partnership.

Stabler is dedicated to his job but often takes cases personally, thus affecting his judgment. Nonetheless, Stabler has a 97% case-closure rate as of 2007. His badge number is 6313. In 2002, Stabler stated that he makes $68,000 a year.

Stabler is Irish American and lives with his wife Kathy (Isabel Gillies) and five children (Maureen, Kathleen, Richard "Dickie", Elizabeth "Lizzie", and Elliot "Eli" Jr.). Stabler was born on October 20, 1966. He is devoted to his family and frequently mentions or thinks about them while working cases. He is also a practicing Catholic whose faith, sometimes, is tested by the cases on which he works.

Series creator Dick Wolf named SVU's two lead detectives after his son, Elliot, and his daughter, Olivia. Executive producer and head writer Neal Baer has explained that, in contrast to Benson – "the empathetic, passionate voice for these victims" – Stabler embodies "the rage we feel, the 'How can this happen?' feeling." Of their partnership, Baer assessed that: "They both represent the feelings that we feel simultaneously when we hear about these cases. That's why they work so well together."

== Biography ==
=== Law & Order: Special Victims Unit ===
Stabler was born on October 20, 1966, and raised in Bayside, Queens. His father, Joseph Stabler Sr., was a policeman who lost his job and pension after refusing to testify against a corrupt fellow officer, and who eventually died of cancer. Stabler had a difficult relationship with his father, who was physically and emotionally abusive. His mother, Bernadette (Ellen Burstyn), has bipolar disorder and once nearly killed her son during a manic episode. As a result, Stabler has "erased his childhood"; he rarely talks about his father and maintains little contact with his mother. He has two brothers, Randall (Dean Norris) and Joseph Jr. (Michael Trotter), and two sisters, Dee and Sharon.

He attended Bayside High School, where he played on the football team.

Stabler was a Marine and served in Operation Desert Storm. During his time in the military, he was a hand-to-hand combat specialist. He has three tattoos, notably the Eagle, Globe, and Anchor tattoo on his forearm (the official emblem of the Marine Corps), and the crucifixion of Christ on his left bicep. One of his best friends died in the September 11 attacks. He has a B.A. from Queens College, which he obtained by going to night classes.

Stabler harbors a great deal of anger that is sometimes fueled by his job. He is often openly aggressive and intimidating toward suspects, which can either complicate the case further or lead to speedy confessions. When his wife Kathy (Isabel Gillies) leaves him in Season 6, Stabler's anger rises closer to the surface and, in a few episodes, threatens to boil over. One such instance occurs in a case involving serial killer Gordon Rickett (Matthew Modine), whom Stabler had investigated for raping and murdering a young girl 14 years earlier and had thrown through a plate glass window. During interrogation, Rickett tells Stabler that they harbor the same kind of rage, and that if it were not for his family and his job, Stabler would be just like him. When Benson and Stabler catch Rickett about to murder another young girl, Stabler appears ready to kill him in cold blood; it is only Benson's intervention that prevents him from doing so.

In SVU Season 7, he goes to see a police psychiatrist, Dr. Rebecca Hendrix (Mary Stuart Masterson), after using excessive force on an abusive parent. Stabler eventually opens up to Hendrix about his personal demons, and they become close until Hendrix is transferred. By Season 9, he and Kathy reconcile, and Stabler learns to better deal with his problems.

In the Season 12 finale, Stabler is forced to shoot Jenna Fox (Hayley McFarland), a young woman who opened fire in the Special Victims squad room on the men who raped and murdered her mother, killing them and recurring character Sister Peg (Charlayne Woodard). Jenna dies in his arms. After the shootout, Stabler is placed on administrative leave by the NYPD's Internal Affairs Bureau. Although he is eventually cleared, this shooting is the sixth such incident in his NYPD career. His superior, Captain Donald Cragen (Dann Florek), comments that if Stabler wants to keep his job, he will have to undergo a psychological evaluation, take an anger management class, and submit to an internal review of his entire personnel file. Benson is confident that Stabler will "tell them to go to hell", and he proves her right by retiring from the force off-screen during the SVU Season 13 premiere.

Stabler appears in the Season 22 episode "Return of the Prodigal Son", having been absent from the series for 10 years. It is revealed that, after quitting SVU, Stabler worked in private security before he got a job as the NYPD's liaison in Rome, going after terrorists and organized crime. He comes back to New York to attend a ceremony honoring Benson, whom he has not seen or spoken to since leaving SVU. Stabler is targeted by mobsters who plant a bomb in his rental car, but it ends up killing Kathy instead. (Note: Exactly which member of the Wheatley mafia family ordered the bombing and why is never conclusively established before all the potential suspects are killed by the middle of Season 2; in some theories of the crime advanced by characters in the show, Kathy was actually the real target, in order to torment Stabler with her death.) Stabler is devastated, but determined to bring her killers to justice, and joins the NYPD's new Organized Crime Control Bureau.

=== Law & Order: Organized Crime ===
==== Season 1 ====
In the Organized Crime Task Force, Stabler is partnered with Sergeant Ayanna Bell (Danielle Moné Truitt). He comes to suspect that gangster Richard Wheatley (Dylan McDermott) ordered the bombing because Stabler was investigating him and his father, mob boss Manfredi Sinatra (Chazz Palminteri). Stabler, Bell, Detective Diego Morales (Michael Rivera), Detective Freddie Washburn (Ben Chase), and technician Jet Slootmaekers (Ainsley Seiger) zero in on Wheatley's criminal empire, which is smuggling COVID-19 vaccine.

It is implied in Organized Crime that Stabler has post-traumatic stress disorder as a result of the bombing and Kathy's death. Benson tells him to get help, but he angrily rejects her advice, telling her to "back off". Benson later joins Stabler's children in staging an intervention for him, but he rebuffs them and storms out. Later on, however, he reaches out to Wheatley's ex-wife Angela (Tamara Taylor) because she understands his pain, as her oldest son, Rafiq, had been murdered a year earlier. Stabler and Angela nearly sleep together until Stabler pulls back, realizing that he is crossing professional lines and that he is not ready for a new relationship. They agree to keep the relationship professional, and are on good terms – until Stabler comes to suspect that Angela ordered the bombing, which was meant for Kathy, not him.

Angela later tells him that Kathy's murder was revenge for her son's death, which her ex-husband told her occurred during a police raid Stabler had ordered. Stabler replies that he had nothing to do with Rafiq's death, and that it was in fact Wheatley, then Rafiq's stepfather, who had him killed after catching him stealing from his drug ring. Angela then promises to help Stabler put Wheatley in prison. He ultimately arrests Wheatley, who makes a deal with federal officials to provide information on his Mafia connections in return for a reduced sentence.

==== Season 2 ====
Stabler is assigned to infiltrate the Kosta Organization, an Albanian crime family; posing as ex-con Eddie Wagner, he becomes bodyguard to Reggie Bogdani (Dash Mihok), a soldier for Don Jon Kosta (Michael Raymond-James). His first assignment is to help Bogdani and his uncle, Kosta's underboss Albi Briscu (Vinnie Jones), burn down a bar in which they have murdered the owner, who owed them money, in order to make his death look like an accident. That night, while celebrating with his new "employers", Stabler is drugged. He goes to Benson's apartment in a panic, and she sends him to Bell's house to sleep it off.

Stabler finds out that Briscu is closeted, and murdered his male lover to keep from being outed. Briscu threatens to kill Stabler to keep him quiet, but Stabler assures Briscu that his secret is safe with him. In gratitude, Briscu vouches for Stabler when he gets into a confrontation with Kosta's nephew. Briscu's wife Flutura (Lolita Davidovich) is attracted to Stabler, who plays along in order to get closer into the Kosta Organization. After Stabler covertly helps Bell and Benson rescue a young girl that the Kosta Organization is trafficking, however, Flutura becomes suspicious that someone in the family is a traitor. After Bogdani botches a hit on gubernatorial candidate Teddy Garcia (Elliot Villar) and kills Garcia's wife Diana (Allison Thomas Lee), Stabler and Bell arrest him and get him to inform on the Kosta Organization, bringing the entire operation down.

Meanwhile, in a crossover between SVU and Organized Crime, Wheatley's trial begins. Wheatley's lawyer, Rafael Barba (Raúl Esparza), who was once the Assistant District Attorney for SVU, accuses Stabler of framing Wheatley for Kathy's murder. Stabler feigns out-of-control anger on the witness stand in order to be cited for contempt of court and thrown out of the courtroom so he can be alone with Wheatley. He baits Wheatley by insinuating that he slept with Angela; as intended, this tactic provokes Wheatley to testify in his own defense, during which he loses his temper and threatens prosecuting ADA Dominick "Sonny" Carisi, Jr. (Peter Scanavino) in open court. Much to Stabler's surprise, however, the jury comes back deadlocked, resulting in a mistrial. The District Attorney's office ultimately decides not to pursue a retrial, meaning that he will not be punished legally for ordering Kathy's murder.

After Wheatley and cyberterrorist Sebastian McClane (Robin Lord Taylor) hack into the New York Stock Exchange and steal millions, Stabler and his team go after them, but Stabler jeopardizes the investigation by beating Wheatley up upon discovering that he used the date of Kathy's death as the password to his encrypted files. Stabler then pretends to go on a romantic date with Angela knowing full well that Wheatley is spying on them; as intended, this sends Wheatley into a jealous rage. Meanwhile, Bell threatens to take Stabler off the task force, but he manages to persuade her and their superiors to give him two more days to prove Wheatley's guilt, offering to resign from the NYPD if he fails.

Soon afterward, Wheatley strong-arms McClane into crippling the city's power grid, causing rolling blackouts. After double-crossing McClane and leaving him to die, Wheatley demands Richie's release from prison, a private jet to take him and Angela out of the city, and Stabler admitting to "framing" him for Kathy's murder on livestream. The NYPD release Richie to Wheatley's custody, but Wheatley stuns them by killing his own son. He then reveals that he has kidnapped Bernadette, and will kill her unless Stabler makes his "confession". Stabler refuses to absolve Wheatley of Kathy's murder, however, and manages to rescue his mother.

After Slootmaekers restores the city's power grid with McClane's help, Stabler calls Angela, who is on the run with Wheatley. He tells her that Wheatley murdered Richie, which provokes her to deliberately crash her car into the ocean, with her and Wheatley inside. Angela's body is found in the crash, but Wheatley's isn't.

The next day, Bell tells Stabler that he is being brought before a disciplinary committee, and is in danger of losing his job and pension. That night, fellow undercover NYPD detective and family friend Frank Donnelly (Denis Leary) comes to his aid, having been alerted to Stabler's problems by Benson. Soon afterward, however, Stabler learns from an undercover informant that Donnelly is the leader of the Brotherhood, a ring of corrupt cops working for the Marcy Street Killers, an organized crime syndicate operated by crime boss Preston Webb (Mykelti Williamson).

Stabler ingratiates himself with Donnelly by helping him take money off a dead drug dealer, even pretending to take a bribe. With help from Bell and Slootmaekers, he soon learns that the drug dealer he and Donnelly robbed worked for Webb. After Stabler saves Donnelly from Webb's hitmen, he becomes Donnelly's second-in-command. They become close, with Donnelly even naming his newborn son after Stabler. Eventually, Donnelly decides to step down from the Brotherhood and names Stabler as his successor. When assassin Natalie Dumont (Adrienne Walker) tries to kill Stabler on orders from Webb's wife Cassandra (Jennifer Beals), he arrests her and makes a deal with her to inform on the Marcy Killers in return for a lighter prison sentence. This allows Bell to arrest the entire gang, along with Cassandra, who has murdered her husband.

Meanwhile, Stabler uncovers evidence suggesting that his late father faked the shooting that led to him being awarded the NYPD's Combat Cross medal and framed an innocent man. He later confirms this by recovering a bullet from the tree he and his father used for target practice and having Slootmaekers analyze it, proving that it matches the bullet shot into the elder Stabler's leg, which came from his old partner Gus Hanson's (Paul O'Brien) gun. Stabler confronts Hanson, who gets back at him by telling Donnelly that Stabler is working undercover to bring down the Brotherhood. Donnelly in turn sets Stabler up to be killed during a fake robbery, but Stabler manages to escape and track down Donnelly, who commits suicide by stepping in front of a moving train. Stabler is then awarded the Combat Cross, but he still apologizes to the father of the man that his father framed.

==== Season 3 ====
In the crossover series premiere, Stabler and Bell team up with Detectives Frank Cosgrove (Jeffrey Donovan) and Jalen Shaw (Mehcad Brooks) of the NYPD's 27th Precinct to investigate the murder of Ava Marchenko (Alexandra Avezova). Stabler then uses the assistance of his confidential informant, Vince (Andrew Yackel), to take down the culprit, Mark Sirenko (Beau Knapp). A few weeks later, Stabler and his new partner, Jamie Whelan (Brent Antonello), investigate the murder of Henry Cole (Jeorge Bennett Watson). In the next episode, Stabler and Whelan chase after Kenny Kyle (Michael Drayer) after he is revealed to be Henry's murderer. In that following episode, Stabler and Whelan track down Dominic Russo (Wass Stevens) and Vincent Bishop (Kevin Corrigan) who ordered Kenny to kill Henry.

After testifying against The Brotherhood, Stabler gets called in by SVU Detective Amanda Rollins (Kelli Giddish) to investigate the rape of a mother and her child by a gang posing as cops. During that investigation, Stabler's loyalty to his fellow officers is repeatedly questioned by suspects and witnesses. While Organized Crime Detective Bobby Reyes (Rick Gonzalez) attempts to track down his sexually abusive foster father Leonard Baker (Daniel Jenkins), Stabler and Whelan chase after Vaughn Davis (Christopher Cassarino) in order to arrest him for his crimes. While investigating an illegal jewelry smuggling ring, Stabler reunites with Tia Leonetti (Ayelet Zurer), who was his partner while he was working in Rome. Stabler and Tia then work the case against Russian gangster Mikael Abramov (Mark Ivanir) together and manage to take down his criminal empire. Tia then shows up at Stabler's doorstep and attempts to revisit old feelings. The next morning, Tia reveals that she stayed the night and that she is flying back to Rome.

After Pearl Serrano (Camilla Belle) is poisoned, Stabler investigates her husband Teddy Silas (Gus Halper), a small-time gangster. After the real culprit is found, Stabler and Reyes discover that Teddy murdered the man and arrest him. During interrogation, Teddy reveals that his father Robert (John Doman), a corrupt real estate developer, ordered Pearl's poisoning. The next morning, Stabler and Bell find out where Robert is hiding and meet with him to make a deal. However, the squad ends up getting ambushed by Elio Costello (Eric T. Miller).

After Tino Alvarez (Markice Moore) requests Stabler's help in finding his kidnapped wife, Stabler recruits the task force to find Sherie (Ayla Eloy). However, after discovering that she was kidnapped by street racers, Whelan goes undercover as a street racer to find Sherie. During the case, Stabler has a session with a therapist in which he confesses to being selfish when he ended his partnership with Benson in 2011. The next day, when Whelan goes against procedure, Stabler replaces him and goes undercover to trap Cuban drug lord Antonio Duran (Tony Amendola). In the end, Bernanda Diaz (Ana Osorio), Duran's right hand and lover, murders Duran, and Stabler arrests her.

A few weeks later, Stabler assists Bell in the investigation of Irish mobster Eamon Murphy (Timothy V. Murphy) for the murder of her former partner, Detective Darryl Jennings. Stabler then recruits Teddy Silas into using his bar and then goes undercover as the bar owner to trap Murphy. Slootmaekers also goes undercover and develops a relationship with Murphy's right-hand man Seamus O'Meara (Michael Malarkey). After Slootmaekers is kidnapped, Stabler and the task force find her with Seamus, who is attempting suicide. Seamus is arrested and Slootmaekers is rescued. In the end, Murphy is let go and not charged with any crimes due to his connections. A few weeks later, Stabler investigates the kidnapping of Janelle Carver (Brandi Bravo), the daughter of his army buddy, David Carver (Michael Biehn).

Stabler then investigates the shooting of Jennifer Lee (Esther Chen) and develops a close relationship with her husband Stephen (Grant Chang), bonding over their grief for their wives. Stabler discovers that Lee's campaign manager, Michael Quan (François Chau), is the leader of a human trafficking ring and is responsible for Jennifer's shooting. While investigating Quan, Stabler meets Wen Shao (Michael Tow), whose son has been kidnapped by Quan and the human traffickers. Stabler manages to find Wen's son and arrest Quan with the help of his task force. In the following episode, Stabler assists Bell in finding a serial rapist who drugs and assaults gay men in bars, including Detective Eric Geary (Adrian Anchondo).

In the following episode, Stabler investigates the attempted murder of Madame Diya Laghari (Karen David), who has been targeted by a terrorist group. Stabler is assigned as her bodyguard throughout the investigation. Before Laghari can return to India, Stabler discovers that she has semiconductors hidden in the briefcase. Stabler and Laghari inform the counterterrorism chief Nowak (Joe Forbrich) that Laghari's former bodyguard smuggled in the semiconductors.

In the following episode, Stabler and Bell investigated Junior Suarez (Marc Reign) for murder and try to prove his guilt since he was in prison on the night of the murder. In the following crossover episode, Stabler teams up with Benson to take down Shadowërk, a network of mercenaries who commit rapes and murders contracted over the dark web. In the season finale, Stabler teams up with Benson and Rollins and the Special Victims Unit to take down Shadowërk and its creator, Kyle Wilkie (Winter Andrews), at the cost of Whelan's life.

== Family ==
Stabler married his wife, Kathy (Isabel Gillies), when they were both 17 years old and, at the beginning of the series, they have four school-aged children: Maureen (Erin Broderick), Kathleen (Holiday Segal in SVU Season 1 and Allison Siko in SVU Seasons 3–12 and Organized Crime), and twins Richard "Dickie" (Jeffrey Scaperrotta), and Elizabeth "Lizzie" (Patricia Cook). Richard (he stopped using his nickname upon entering adolescence) is named after Col. Richard Finley (James Brolin), Stabler's former commanding officer in the Marines, whom Stabler later arrests after discovering that he murdered a woman.

After years of the stress involved with being married to a police officer, Kathy leaves Stabler, taking their children, and temporarily moves in with her mother. Following a case involving a divorce that turned violent, Stabler signs the divorce papers, saying, "when love warps to hate, there's nothing you won't do." However, after being cleared in the death of a suspect, Stabler realizes that he cannot bear to lose either his job or his family, so he seeks reconciliation with his wife. A short time later, Kathy announces that she is pregnant and asks Stabler to come home. After a serious car accident, Kathy delivers a healthy baby boy, Elliot "Eli" Stabler Jr. (born November 17, 2007). Kathy nearly dies as a result of the crash, but paramedics are able to save her with Benson's help.

Of his five children, Kathleen and Dickie have most directly affected his job. Kathleen is twice charged with DUI; he uses his influence as a police officer to make the first charge disappear, but he eventually realizes that he has to let her face the consequences of her actions, and she is sentenced to community service. Kathleen then steals her father's credit card and gives it to her boyfriend, who rings up thousands of dollars in charges. She is later arrested for breaking and entering and robbery, at which time doctors and her family realize that she has bipolar disorder, which is a condition she shares with her paternal grandmother, Bernadette. When she faces prison time, Stabler reaches out to his mother for the first time in three years and asks her to tell Kathleen about her illness so she will get help. After speaking with her grandmother, Kathleen agrees to treatment. She later becomes an advocate for sexual assault victims, and in one episode, helps her father on a case.

Dickie also occasionally gives his father problems. In a Season 11 episode, he runs away from school and tries to join the Army, something Stabler disapproves of. It later turns out that Dickie is acting out because his friend, Shane, has been murdered. Stabler refuses to sign a parental consent form for Dickie to join the Army, but resolves to be a more attentive parent.

Stabler is fiercely protective of his children and becomes defensive if a suspect asks about his family; it is suggested that he sees aspects of his children in every victim. As a result, he harbors an intense hatred of pedophiles, admitting to a police psychiatrist that he sometimes fantasizes about killing them. He almost loses his job as a result. In a later episode, he beats up a pedophile (Tom Noonan) who posts a picture of his daughter Elizabeth on his website.

Stabler has occasionally seen aspects of himself in a child abuser; during one case, the actions of an abusive parent prompt him to recall an incident in which he lost his temper and raised a hand to his daughter Maureen, who was a toddler at the time.

Child victims tend to respond to him. For example, Stabler successfully reaches out to a 15-year-old girl (Rachael Bella) who regresses to a childlike state after being sexually assaulted by her father. SVU's resident psychiatrist, Dr. George Huang (B.D. Wong), theorizes that only Stabler would be able to reach her, as he is a father, and she is looking for a father figure.

=== Kathy's death and beyond ===
In the Season 22 episode "Return of the Prodigal Son", Kathy is severely injured in a car bombing, and later dies in hospital when her spleen ruptures. Her death leads Stabler to join the Organized Crime Control Bureau.

In the aftermath of Kathy's murder, Stabler takes Eli (Nicky Torchia) to live with him, although he is rarely home. Meanwhile, Stabler's mother Bernadette is arrested after having a manic episode in which she slaps a child she believes to be Elliot. Stabler sees that her illness is worsening, and takes her in to live with him and Eli, with Kathleen occasionally checking in. When Bernadette accuses Eli of stealing her medication, Stabler dismisses it as paranoia – until Benson discovers that Eli is indeed stealing and selling Bernadette's Valium.

When Eli is charged in the death of a girl he had been partying with, Stabler asks Slootmaekers to find out everything she can about the victim. Slootmaekers discovers that the girl was in fact murdered by a hitman with ties to Wheatley. The crime boss further interferes in Stabler's family by hiring elderly con artist Miles Darman (James Cromwell) to romance Bernadette as a cover for spying on him. Darman develops real feelings for Bernadette, but unwittingly helps Wheatley kidnap her and hold her hostage as part of his master plan to force Stabler to make a false confession to framing him for Kathy's murder. Stabler manages to save Bernadette, however, and has Darman arrested.

In season 2, Stabler discovers that his late father's Combat Cross, which he was awarded after supposedly saving his partner Gus Hansen's (Paul O'Brien) life, was obtained under false pretenses; the elder Stabler had in fact covered up for Hansen after the latter shot and killed an unarmed child by having his partner shoot him the leg to make it look like the child had opened fire on them.

== Partners ==
=== Olivia Benson ===
Stabler is partnered with Olivia Benson for SVU's first 12 seasons. They are best friends and trust each other completely. Stabler is Benson's longest relationship with a man, and they have even each promised to give the other a kidney should either of them need a transplant. When Kathy goes into labor with Eli following a car accident, Benson helps save Kathy's life and deliver the baby.

Their relationship is not without friction, however. The two sometimes argue over the cases they work on; Benson tends to be quicker to side with the victims, while Stabler is more skeptical. For example, during a case in which three women are charged with raping a male stripper, Benson and ADA Alexandra Cabot (Stephanie March) believe the man's story, while Stabler takes a cynical view of his claim from the start.

Benson and Stabler are separated at times during the show. She asks for a new partner after Stabler expects her to jeopardize his life to shoot a convicted sex offender (Lou Diamond Phillips) who had kidnapped two children and killed one of them. Instead, she is briefly reassigned to computer crimes and replaced by a Queens SVU detective, Lucius Blaine (Anthony Anderson). Benson and Stabler become partners again in the eighth season. They remain partners for the rest of Stabler's time in the precinct.

In the Season 12 episode "Merchandise", Benson and Stabler are temporarily appointed as Special Deputy U.S. Marshals so they can arrest the leaders of a human trafficking operation located outside their jurisdiction. Once the criminals are in custody they turn in the badges and take up their positions in SVU again.

After Stabler abruptly quits his job, he does not see or speak to Benson again for 10 years. When they finally see each other again, he tells her that he could not bear to tell her he was leaving, and did not know how to reach out to her in the intervening years. When Stabler's car is bombed and his wife Kathy severely injured, Benson, now SVU's Captain, has to restrain him from getting involved in the investigation. This causes friction between them, and they have a quietly emotional conversation about how their partnership ended. When Kathy dies, however, Benson does everything she can to comfort and support her grieving friend, and to help him make sure that Kathy's murderers face justice.

Benson also recognizes that Stabler is showing signs of PTSD, and tries unsuccessfully to persuade him to get help, even staging an intervention with his children. Stabler rejects her help, but tells her he loves her.

=== Lucius Blaine ===
Lucius Blaine (Anthony Anderson) first appears in the episode "Fat", having been transferred over from Brooklyn SVU and temporarily assigned as Stabler's partner after Benson transfers to the Computer Crimes Division. After they solve a case together, Blaine goes back to Brooklyn SVU.

=== Dani Beck ===
Stabler is assigned a temporary partner named Dani Beck (Connie Nielsen) while Benson is working undercover in Oregon (Mariska Hargitay was pregnant and on maternity leave). Beck takes well to the job, and she and Stabler become close. There is also some sexual tension between the two, and they share a kiss at one point. The relationship doesn't go further, however, as Stabler realizes that he still loves his wife; Beck, meanwhile, leaves SVU when she realizes that she will not be able to save every victim.

=== Jo Marlowe ===
Jo Marlowe (Sharon Stone) was Stabler's training officer. She is appointed by District Attorney Jack McCoy (Sam Waterston) to be the new ADA for the SVU squad during a four-episode run in Season 11. Stabler reveals that he has not seen her for 15 years when she first arrives as the new ADA. Marlowe was a lieutenant in 1995 when she left the NYPD after her command decision resulted in the deaths of two of her officers. She was diagnosed with an "aggressive" type of breast cancer and had a bilateral radical mastectomy a year before joining the SVU squad.

=== Ayanna Bell ===
Ayanna Bell (Danielle Moné Truitt) is Stabler's new partner in the Organized Crime Task Force and is in charge of the task force on which he serves, holding the rank of Sergeant.

== Awards and decorations ==
The following are the medals and service awards worn by Elliot Stabler, as seen in "Dolls."

American Flag Breast Bar
NYPD Medal of Honor
NYPD Unit Citation Bar

In "Do or Die" (Law & Order: Organized Crime, Season 2, Episode 22), Stabler is awarded the New York City Police Department Combat Cross for his actions in taking down the Marcy Killers and the Brotherhood.

== Development and casting ==
Casting for the lead characters on Law & Order: Special Victims Unit occurred in spring 1999. Dick Wolf, along with officials from NBC and Studios USA, were at the final auditions for the two leads at Rockefeller Center. The last round had been narrowed down to six finalists. For the male lead – Stabler – Tim Matheson, John Slattery, and Meloni were being considered. For the female role – Benson – the finalists were Samantha Mathis, Reiko Aylesworth, and Mariska Hargitay. Meloni and Hargitay had auditioned in the final round together, and after the actors left, there was a moment of dead silence, after which Wolf blurted out, "Oh well. There's no doubt who we should choose – Hargitay and Meloni." The duo, who Wolf believed had the perfect chemistry from the first time he saw them together, were his first choice. Garth Ancier, head of NBC, agreed, and the rest of the panel assembled voiced their assent.

In May 2009, after the show's tenth season, Hargitay and Meloni's contracts expired when they were reportedly making $375,000–$385,000 per episode. During negotiations in April for a new contract, the actors attempted to receive a percentage of the show's profits. It was rumored that NBC threatened to replace Hargitay and Meloni if they persisted in their demands. Two months later, however, it was officially reported that both their contracts had been renewed for two more years.

=== Departure from SVU ===
In May 2011, Meloni announced that he would not be returning to SVU in fall 2011 for its 13th season after the failure of negotiations over a new contract. The Stabler character was subsequently written out of the show.

=== Guest return to SVU ===
Stabler returned in the Special Victims Unit episode "Return of the Prodigal Son", when his wife, Kathy, is killed in a car bombing. Her death leads Stabler to reach out to Benson to help find her killers. This episode served as a lead-in for the new series, Organized Crime.

=== Return to Law & Order with Organized Crime ===
On March 31, 2020, NBC announced that it had ordered a 13-episode series with Meloni reprising his role as Stabler in a then-untitled SVU spinoff, to be produced by Dick Wolf. Later announced as Law & Order: Organized Crime, which centers on an organized crime task force. Meloni's spin-off was initially slated for a fall release, but plans for the series were delayed to 2021. As a result of this, plans for him to appear in the 22nd-season premiere of Law & Order: Special Victims Unit were subsequently scrapped, the show-runner, Warren Leight, deciding to wait until the night of Meloni's spin-off new premiere date.

== Appearances on other shows ==
Stabler appears in three episodes of Law & Order and one episode of Law & Order: Trial by Jury. Since his return to Law & Order: Special Victims Unit, he has made thirteen guest appearances to date.

- Law & Order: "Entitled: Part 2" (February 18, 2000)
- Law & Order: "Fools for Love" (February 23, 2000)
- Law & Order: Trial by Jury: "Day" (May 3, 2005)
- Law & Order: Special Victims Unit: "Return of the Prodigal Son" (April 1, 2021)
- Law & Order: Special Victims Unit: "Trick-Rolled at the Moulin" (May 13, 2021)
- Law & Order: Special Victims Unit: "Wolves in Sheep's Clothing" (June 3, 2021)
- Law & Order: Special Victims Unit: "And the Empire Strikes Back" (September 23, 2021)
- Law & Order: Special Victims Unit: "I Thought You Were on My Side" (September 30, 2021)
- Law & Order: Special Victims Unit: "People vs. Richard Wheatley" (December 9, 2021)
- Law & Order: Special Victims Unit: "Did You Believe in Miracles?" (May 5, 2022)
- Law & Order: Special Victims Unit: "Gimme Shelter – Part Two" (September 22, 2022)
- Law & Order: "Gimme Shelter – Part Three" (September 22, 2022)
- Law & Order: Special Victims Unit: "Blood Out" (January 26, 2023)
- Law & Order: Special Victims Unit: "Bad Things" (May 11, 2023)
- Law & Order: Special Victims Unit: "All Pain Is One Malady" (May 18, 2023)
- Law & Order: Special Victims Unit: "Play with Fire Part 2" (April 17, 2025)
- Law & Order: Special Victims Unit: "In the Wind" (September 25, 2025)

== Reception ==
Meloni was nominated for an Emmy Award in 2006, in the category of Outstanding Lead Actor in a Drama Series, for his role as Elliot Stabler.
