= Agnes (2021 film) =

2021 American horror film

- Theatrical release poster
- Directed by: Mickey Reece
- Written by: Mickey Reece; John Selvidge
- Produced by: Jensine Carr; Molly Quinn; Matthew M. Welty; Elan Gale; Jacob Snovel
- Starring: Hayley McFarland
- Music by: Nicholas Poss
- Production companies: Divide/Conquer; QWGmire
- Distributed by: Magnet Releasing
- Release dates: June 12, 2021 (Tribeca); December 10, 2021
- Running time: 93 minutes
- Country: United States
- Language: English
- Box office: $5,526

Agnes is a 2021 American horror film directed by Mickey Reece and starring Hayley McFarland as the titular character.

== Premise ==
Rumors of demonic possession at a religious convent prompts a church investigation into the strange goings-on among its nuns. A disaffected priest and his neophyte are confronted with temptation, bloodshed and a crisis of faith.

== Cast ==
- Molly Quinn as Mary
- Hayley McFarland as Agnes
- Sean Gunn as Paul Satchimo
- Rachel True as Sister Ruth
- Chris Sullivan as Curly
- Jake Horowitz as Hola
- Chris Browning as Father Black
- Ben Hall as Father Donaghue
- Ginger Gilmartin as Wanda
- Mary Buss as Mother Superior

== Production ==
Filming occurred in Oklahoma and wrapped in February 2020.

== Release ==
The film premiered at the Tribeca Film Festival on June 12, 2021. In September 2021, it was announced that Magnet Releasing acquired North American distribution rights to the film, which was released theatrically and on demand on December 10, 2021.

== Reception ==
=== Box office ===
In its opening weekend, Agnes earned $1,433 from five theaters. The film made $96 in its sophomore weekend from three theaters.

=== Critical response ===
Metacritic, which uses a weighted average, assigned the film a score of 65 out of 100, based on 13 critics, indicating "generally favorable" reviews.

Katie Rife of The A.V. Club wrote: “…those looking for straightforward supernatural chills would be better off watching whatever turns up when they search “exorcism” on Netflix... If, on the other other [sic], you're tired of seeing the same old beats hit again and again in these kind of movies, Agnes provides idiosyncratic salvation." Shelagh Rowan-Legg of Screen Anarchy also gave the film a positive review and wrote, "Discordant and fascinating, bizarre and deeply affecting, Agnes marks an intriguing and strong step in Reece's filmography." Scott Weinberg of Thrillist ranked the film #32 of the 40 best horror films of 2021 and wrote, "The film starts out as a somewhat traditional "possessed nun" story, but about halfway through it makes a sharp left turn and becomes a compelling character study about how an innocent young woman must contend with a trauma she can't explain." Lorry Kikta of Film Threat rated the film an 8 out of 10 and wrote, "I can only hope that as Reece’s career progresses, he gets bigger budgets and better resources. His vision is certainly deserving of that, and this is just more proof of his talents." Jeannette White of Comic Book Resources gave the film a negative review and wrote, "Overall, it holds a lot of unfulfilled potential that could have benefited from a concrete theme."
