= Out of Exile (film) =

- Poster
- Directed by: Kyle Kauwika Harris
- Written by: Kyle Kauwika Harris
- Starring: Adam Hampton
- Release date: June 9, 2022 (DeadCENTER)
- Running time: 107 minutes
- Country: United States
- Language: English

Out of Exile is a 2022 American crime thriller drama film written and directed by Kyle Kauwika Harris and starring Adam Hampton.

== Cast ==
- Adam Hampton as Gabriel Russell
- Ryan Merriman as Agent Brett Solomon
- Kyle Jacob Henry as Wesley Russell
- Karrie Cox as Agent Jordan
- Danny Boy as Devland
- Jake Roberts as Remy
- Luce Rains as Sheriff Dan Pogue
- Hayley McFarland as Dawn Russell
- Peter Greene as Whitman Rader

== Production ==
The film was shot in Shawnee, Oklahoma, Yukon, Oklahoma and Oklahoma City in 2020 during the COVID-19 pandemic.

== Release ==
The film premiered at the DeadCENTER Film Festival on June 9, 2022. Then it was released in theaters, on digital and on demand on January 20, 2023.

== Reception ==
The film has a 29% rating on Rotten Tomatoes based on seven reviews.

== Award ==
The film was named the Best Oklahoma Feature at the 2022 DeadCENTER Film Festival.
