= Jeorge Bennett Watson =

American Film/TV and theatre actor (born 1965)

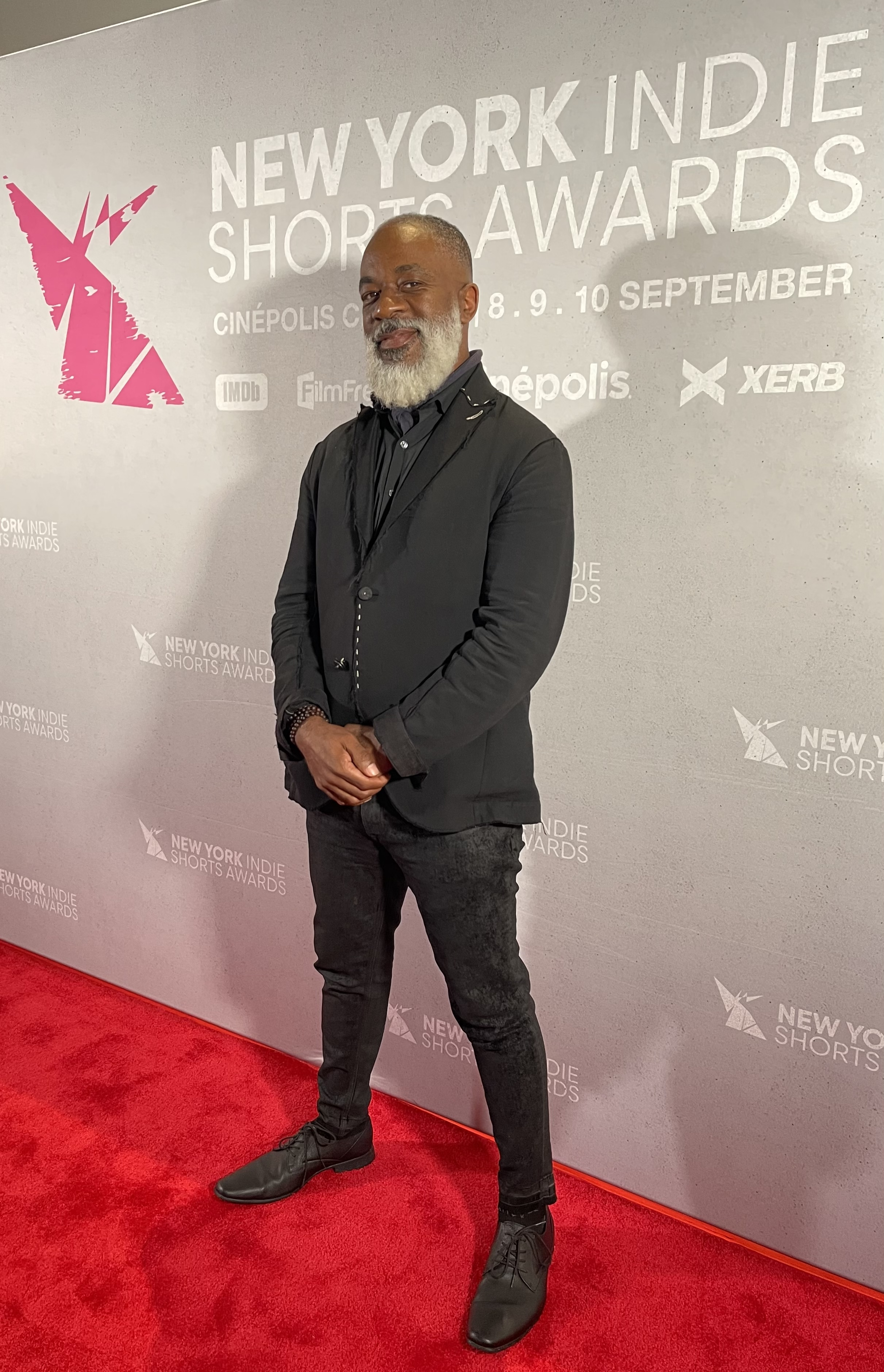
- Born: October 4, 1965 (age 60); Windsor, NC, U.S.
- Education: Maryland Institute College of Art, Atlantic Acting School
- Occupations: Actor, Voice-Over artist
- Years active: 1989–present
- Children: 2

Jeorge Bennett Watson (born October 4, 1965) is an American actor. He has appeared in television shows including Blue Bloods, Law & Order: Organized Crime, FBI: Most Wanted, For Life, Luke Cage, Shameless, Justified, The Wire and Homicide: Life on the Street. He has also appeared in several indie and short films. He currently resides in New York City.

== Early life ==
Watson was born in Bertie County (North Carolina), in the town of Windsor, to Kertrina Grandy Watson and George Benton Watson of Ossining NY. He graduated from Bertie County Senior High School and attended the Maryland Institute College of Art, in Baltimore to study illustration and painting. He left school early to pursue acting and the performing arts. Subsequently, Watson has trained at The Studio Theatre Acting Conservatory, The Ivana Chubbuck Studio, ESPA Studios, William Esper Studios, TK Acting Studios, Atlantic Acting School and the Royal Central School of Speech and Drama in London, UK.

== Career ==
In 1989, Watson won the lead role in the Baltimore community theatre, Arena Players' 1990 production of Charles Fuller's “Zooman and the Sign,” as Zooman.

Notable theaters he has worked at include Capital Repertory Theatre, Triad Stage, Pioneer Theatre Company, Orlando Shakespeare Theater, Merrimack Repertory Theatre, and Portland Stage Company.

In 2018 he made his Off-Broadway debut in director Karin Coonrod’s production of Babette’s Feast, as General Loewenhielm/Player 4. He was seen in Manhattan Repertory Theater’s production of David Harm's new play Powerhouse in the fall of 2022.
