= Law & Order: Special Victims Unit season 8 =

Season of American television series

Law & Order: Special Victims Unit
- Season 8
- Season 8 U.S. DVD cover
- Starring: Christopher Meloni; Mariska Hargitay; Richard Belzer; Diane Neal; Ice-T; BD Wong; Tamara Tunie; Dann Florek
- No. of episodes: 22

Release
- Original network: NBC
- Original release: September 19, 2006 – May 22, 2007

Season chronology
- ← Previous; Season 7 Next → Season 9

The eighth season of the television series, Law & Order: Special Victims Unit premiered September 19, 2006 and ended May 22, 2007 on NBC. The series remained in its 10pm/9c Tuesday timeslot. With the introduction of a new partner for Detective Stabler, early episodes of season 8 took on a significantly different focus when compared to those of previous seasons.

== Production ==
The eighth season began filming when Mariska Hargitay was in the final stages of her pregnancy. As a result, two episodes "Informed" and "Scheherazade" made use of desks, folders, and headshots to disguise Benson's abdomen. "Informed" became the season premiere but "Scheherazade" was not incorporated into the plot until 2007. The episode "Burned" was directed by Eriq LaSalle, who worked with Neal Baer and Mariska Hargitay on ER. He described the episode as "a compelling story with edgy performances."

When writing the episode "Responsible", Neal Baer stated that he referred to "an article about... how there's been leaps in terms of research about the effects of alcohol on teenage brains." Judith McCreary stated that information she used to write "Confrontation" came from a Google search; "I ran across a story about women who were raped more than once by the same guy and that made me wonder if his biological clock was ticking." Diane Neal joked about the writers' penchant for disturbing web searches, saying "I'm sure a couple of the writers are on the feds' most wanted Internet predators list too, because they're doing all this research on pedophilia."

Judith McCreary also wrote the season finale "Screwed", during which illegal activities involving the detectives are brought up in the courtroom. She said "I wanted to explore chickens coming home to roost. A lot of shit these cops have been doing they haven't paid for. Benson committed a felony; she should've been kicked off the force and gone to prison."

== Cast changes and returning characters ==
During a six episode absence by Mariska Hargitay, Connie Nielsen was cast to play Stabler's temporary partner, Detective Dani Beck. Dick Wolf said that he was "thrilled that we have someone of Connie's obvious talent, beauty and stature to come in for these episodes. It doesn't get any better than this."

Chris "Ludacris" Bridges made his second appearance on SVU in "Screwed" which concludes the seventh season episode "Venom". Neal Baer explained that he saw this episode as an opportunity to have Adam Beach's character, Detective Chester Lake, become a longer term addition to the show; "Chris causes Ice-T's character Fin major, major, major problems that go back many years. While everything is in disarray, SVU needs some extra hands and Adam's character is brought in to help out."

Three episodes in the second half of the season starred Michael Weston as Simon Marsden, Olivia's half brother. Hargitay described this storyline as "probably the biggest thing that's ever happened to Olivia." The episode in which Marsden is introduced features an appearance by Mary Stuart Masterson in her recurring role of Dr. Rebecca Hendrix.

== Cast ==
=== Main ===
- Christopher Meloni as Senior Detective Elliot Stabler
- Mariska Hargitay as Junior Detective Olivia Benson
- Richard Belzer as Senior Detective John Munch
- Diane Neal as Assistant District Attorney Casey Novak
- Ice-T as Junior Detective Odafin "Fin" Tutuola
- BD Wong as FBI Special Agent Dr. George Huang
- Tamara Tunie as Medical Examiner Dr. Melinda Warner
- Dann Florek as Captain Donald "Don" Cragen

=== Recurring ===
- Erin Broderick as Maureen Stabler
- Caren Browning as Crime Scene Unit Captain Judith Siper
- Patricia Cook as Elizabeth Stabler
- Kim Delaney as Interim Captain Julia Millfield
- David Dollase as FBI Agent Lockwood
- Mike Doyle as Crime Scene Unit Forensics Technician Ryan O'Halloran
- Joel de la Fuente as Technical Assistance Response Unit Technician Ruben Morales
- Peter Gerety as Judge Peter Harrison
- Isabel Gillies as Kathy Stabler
- Anne James as Dr. Jane Larom
- Patricia Kalember as Judge Karen Taten
- Karl Kenzler as Father Denis
- Jill Marie Lawrence as Defense Attorney Cleo Conrad
- Judith Light as Judge Elizabeth Donnelly
- David Lipman as Judge Arthur Cohen
- Peter McRobbie as Judge Walter Bradley
- Joanna Merlin as Judge Lena Petrovsky
- Connie Nielsen as Detective Dani Beck
- Linda Powell as Lauren White
- Ali Reza as Dr. Rohit Mehta
- Jeffrey Scaperrotta as Dickie Stabler
- Allison Siko as Kathleen Stabler
- Vincent Spano as FBI Special Agent Dean Porter
- Lisa Strum as Tonya Majeski
- Ernest Waddell as Ken Randall
- Michael Weston as Simon Marsden

=== Guest stars ===
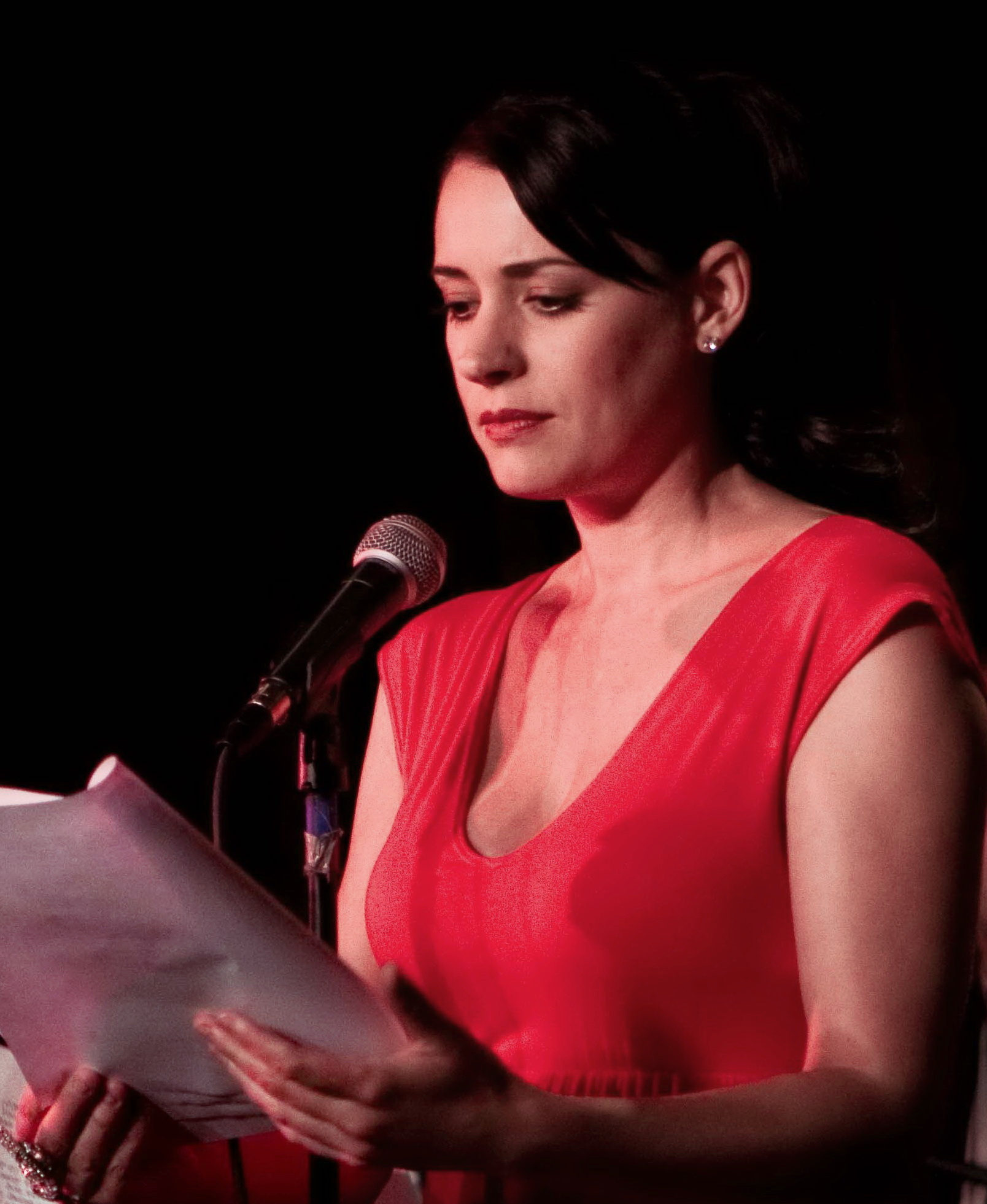
Criminal Minds star Paget Brewster plays Sheila Tierney, daughter of a dying criminal with a checkered past in "Scheherazade".

The season premiere "Informed" saw Marcia Gay Harden reprise her role as Special Agent Dana Lewis, for which she received an Emmy nomination. Acting opposite was Kristen Bush, who shaved her head for the role. After agreeing to do this, Bush said "It was a kind of tenuous connection as to why she was shaved. I probably should have investigated it more, but whatever."

The Primetime Emmy Award for Outstanding Guest Actress in a Drama Series was won by Leslie Caron for her performance in the third episode "Recall". Caron played Lorraine Delmas, a rape victim whose statute of limitations is long over. However, her testimony gets newer evidence admitted after her rapist strikes again. Caron's scene, which was spoken predominantly in French, was described as "a rare appearance in front of American cameras."

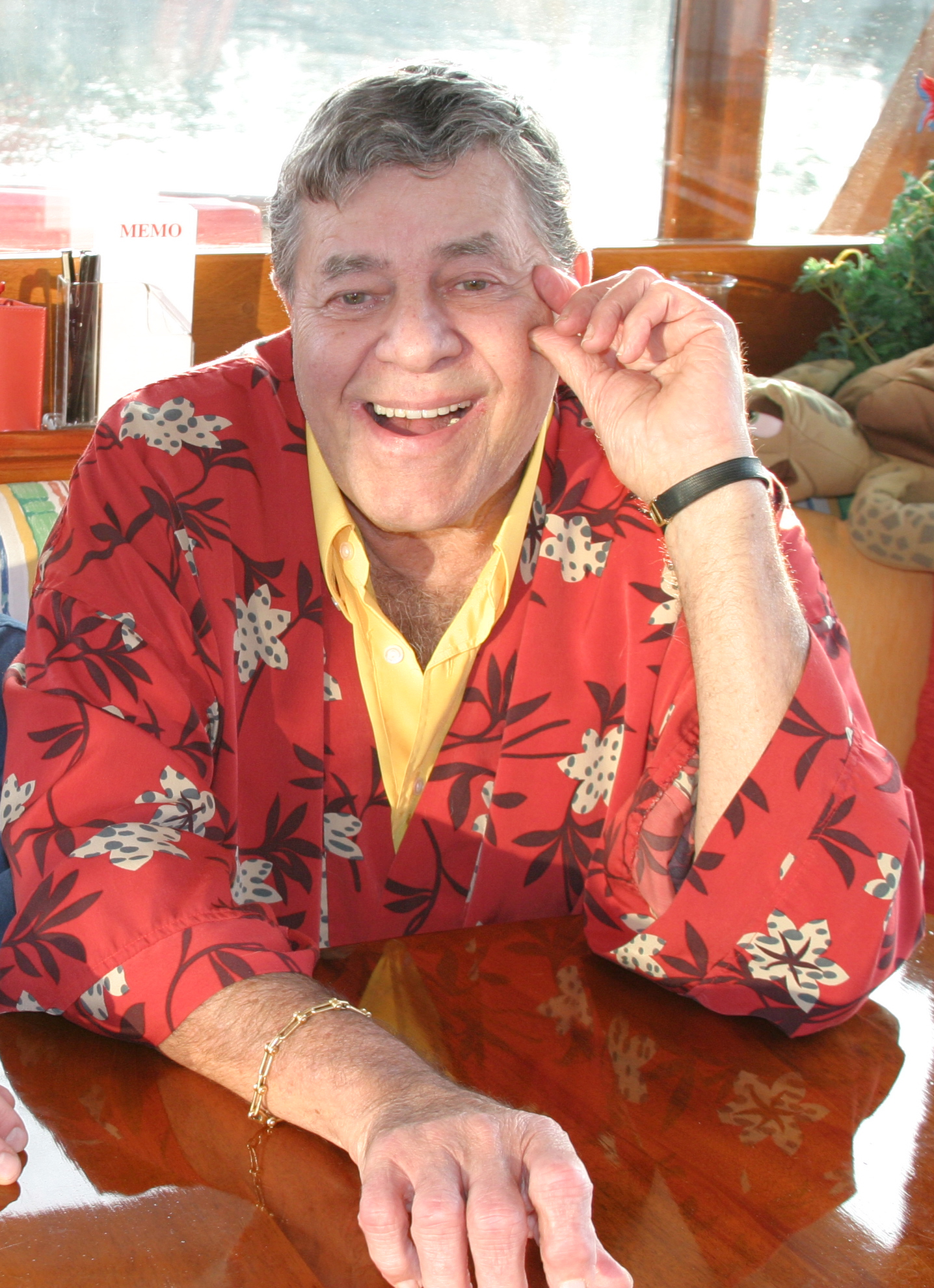
Jerry Lewis appears in "Uncle" as Andrew, the uncle of Det. John Munch.

Jerry Lewis guest starred in the fourth episode "Uncle". He played Andrew Munch, the uncle of Detective John Munch. Neal Baer promoted the episode by saying "He brings both depth and heart to this role and gives insight into how often older people with depression are misdiagnosed."

In the fifth episode "Confrontation", Elanor Hutchins played Elizabeth Hassenback, a woman who was raped and later murdered. Elisabeth Hasselbeck, co-host of The View, objected to the use of a name that was similar to her own and called for a boycott of SVU based on this.

With the sixth episode "Infiltrated", Vincent Spano began playing FBI Agent Dean Porter, the case agent for Detective Benson's undercover work. The character would go on to cross paths with SVU detectives again in later episodes.

In the seventh episode "Underbelly", Diane Neal had a scene with her husband Marcus Fitzgerald who played an ADA.

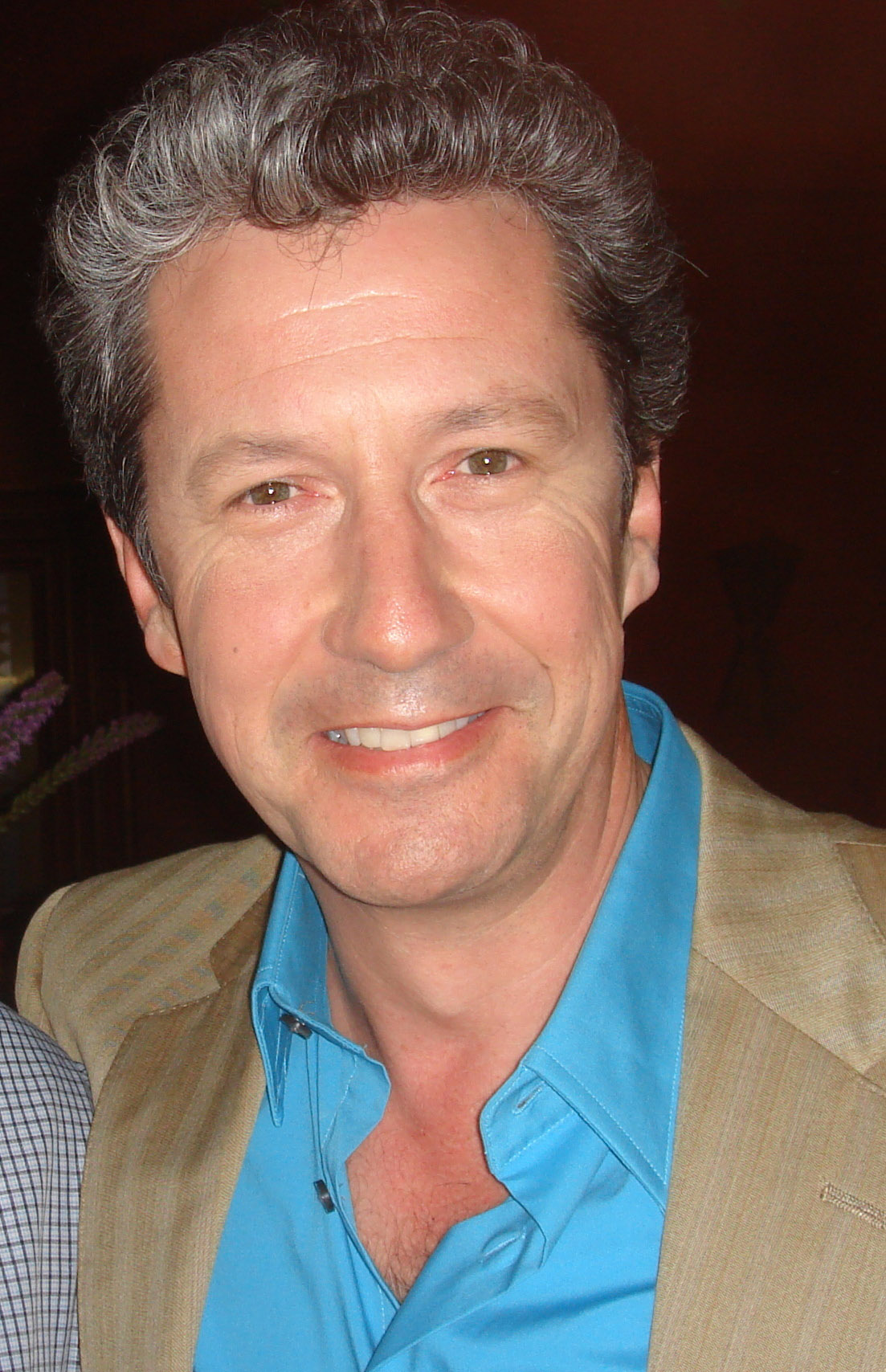
Charles Shaughnessy plays Martin Trenway, a lawyer on trial for rape in "Recall".

In the eighth episode "Cage", Margo Martindale played Rita Gabler, a foster parent whose methods have a devastating effect on a young girl. Neal Baer continued to praise her performance and in 2011 said "I know how good she is because when I did SVU, she put Elle Fanning in a cage and told her to set Connie Nielsen on fire."

The ninth episode "Choreographed" marked the return of Mariska Hargitay's character to the Special Victims Unit. The episode starred Bob Saget as a suspicious husband. Hargitay expressed her excitement about working with Saget and called him "America's biggest secret."

The tenth episode guest starred Paget Brewster as the secretly adopted/stolen daughter of a man who has a criminal past and days to live. The episode shows Benson spending time with the man, as he bluntly tells her and Stabler character, the stories of his crimes, and how Sheila (Brewster) came to be his daughter.

The eleventh episode "Burned" starred Michael Michele as an alleged rape victim who gains the sympathy of Detective Benson but not Detective Stabler. This reunited her with Eriq LaSalle, Neal Baer and Mariska Hargitay from her time on ER. LaSalle, who directed the episode, joked that "It also gave [him] an excuse to boss Michael Michele around."

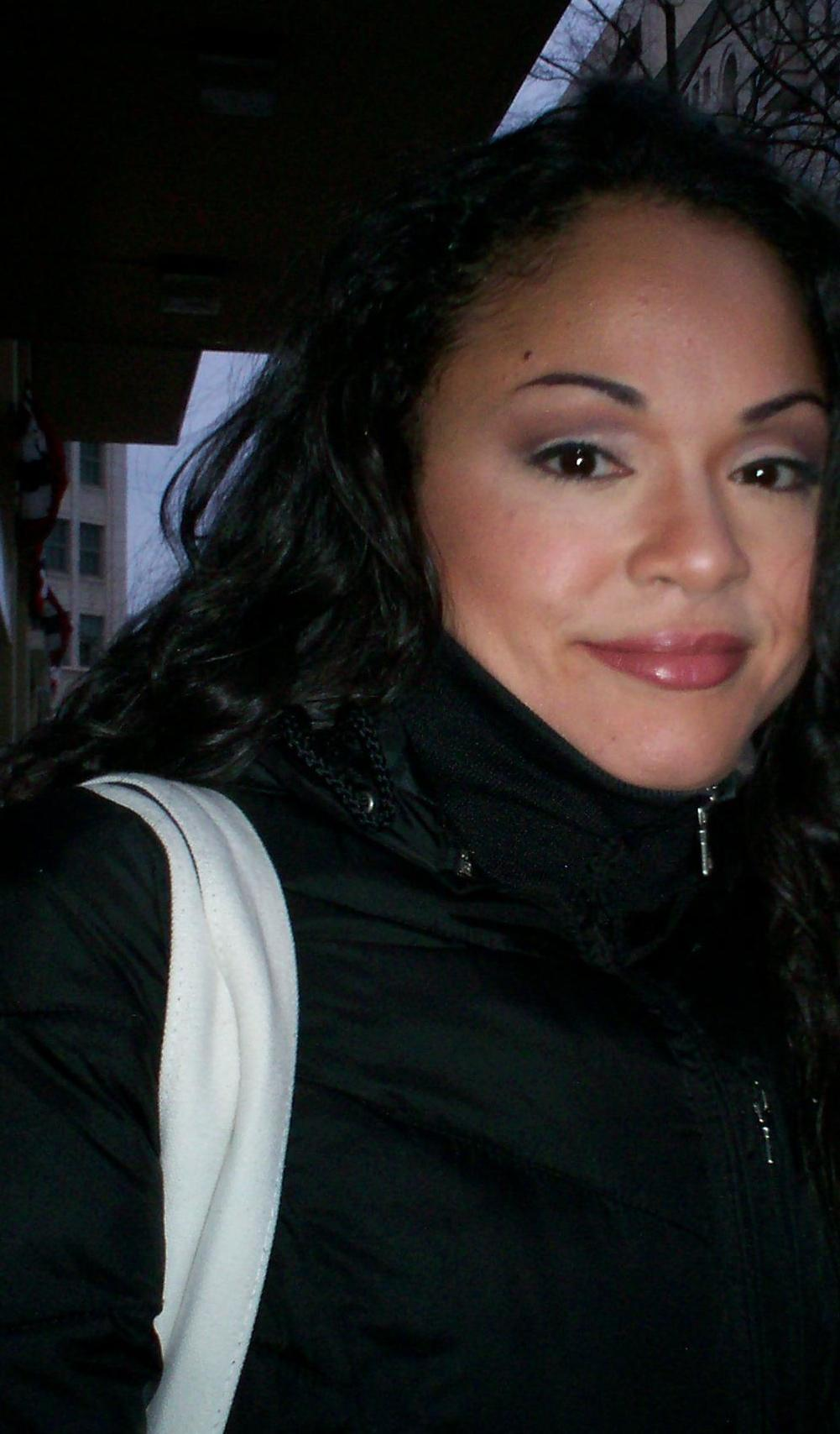
Karen Olivo plays Jennifer Benitez in "Loophole", a desperately sick boy's mother who fears deportation.

The twelfth episode "Outsider" starred Kal Penn as a rapist following an unusual pattern. "Outsider" also introduced Adam Beach to the show; his character forms a temporary partnership with Detective Tutuola. Neal Baer described the guest stars as bringing "some funny moments to SVU" and also applauded the tension shown between Adam Beach and Ice-T. Kelli Giddish, who played one of the victims would later join the show as Det. Amanda Rollins beginning at Season 13.

Bill Goldberg appeared at the beginning of the thirteenth episode "Loophole". Wrestler Bill Goldberg is Neal Baer's cousin and was given a physically intimidating role.

The fourteenth episode "Dependent" featured guest star Cary Elwes as mafia lawyer Sidney Truex, who survives an attack in his home where his wife is murdered. It is later revealed that the boyfriend of Truex's 16-year-old daughter is the murderer.

The sixteenth episode "Philadelphia" showed Detective Benson clashing with a New Jersey cop played by Kim Delaney. Delaney mentioned being an SVU fan especially because of the subject matter addressed in the show and said "It's what we read about in the paper, unfortunately too many times."

The episode "Annihilated" was predicted to be an Emmy contender for Christopher Meloni in the Envelope section of the Los Angeles Times. Dylan Walsh guest starred as Malcolm Royce, a family man involved in a murder suicide. Meloni described Walsh's character as "outwardly a family man like Elliot, who has everything going for him, but this guy's living a double life."

In "Pretend," Misti Traya guest starred as a woman who had been posing as a teenager for years. Noting the similarities, Neal Baer said the writers were "stunned" to hear about the sex offender Neil Havens Rodreick who was caught disguising himself as a twelve-year-old shortly after the episode was written.

In the season finale "Screwed," Chris "Ludacris" Bridges concluded the storyline of his character Darius Parker by defending himself in court. Baer described his performance saying "He defends himself which is cool. So now he takes on the role of a lawyer with Steven Weber playing his lawyer as well."

== Episodes ==
Law & Order: Special Victims Unit season 8 episodes
No. overall	No. in season	Title	Directed by	Written by	Original release date	Prod. code	U.S. viewers (millions)
162	1	"Informed"	Peter Leto	Dawn DeNoon	September 19, 2006	0801	14.55
A young woman (Kristen Bush) shows up at a hospital emergency room beaten and with her head shaved. Despite signs of sexual assault, she demands only a morning-after pill and refuses a rape kit. Accosted on the street by Benson, she returns to her apartment and locks herself in the bathroom but leaves her underwear behind for Benson to steal as evidence. Benson and Stabler try to find out who assaulted the woman by talking to a friend of hers (Ebon Moss-Bachrach) at the cooperative where she works. When she goes missing, FBI Agent Dana Lewis (Marcia Gay Harden) reveals her vital role in a sting operation against an eco-terrorism group. Posing as a radical (Joanna Adler), Benson goes undercover to help prevent a terrorist bombing.
163	2	"Clock"	Jim Hayman	Allison Intrieri	September 26, 2006	0803	14.41
Stabler and Tutuola team up to investigate when a teenage boy (Daniel Farcher) and girl (Betsy Hogg) go missing on a school field trip. The case takes a different turn however, when they realize that the girl has Turner's syndrome making her look twelve when she is seventeen. The girl is found with her lover (Jason Butler Harner), an older man who has found a legal way to have sex with a girl who looks twelve. The girl's parents (Gregory Harrison and Deborah Raffin) and grandfather (Robert Vaughn) take the case to family court but there is nothing they can do since both parties are past the age of consent. When the court is adjourned, Stabler meets his new partner, Detective Dani Beck.
164	3	"Recall"	Juan J. Campanella	Jonathan Greene	October 3, 2006	0805	14.30
Stabler and Cragen have concerns about Beck's reputation as an overzealous investigator. She works with Stabler to help a woman (Lily Rabe) who was raped by a prominent lawyer (Charles Shaughnessy). The squad's credibility is damaged when another woman (Robin Weigert) comes forward, mistakenly claiming that she was raped by the same man. The people are unable to make the charges stick until a surprise witness (Leslie Caron) comes forward.
165	4	"Uncle"	David Platt	Dawn DeNoon	October 10, 2006	0804	13.89
When a mother and daughter are found raped and murdered, Stabler and Beck take in a homeless man who turns out to be Munch's uncle (Jerry Lewis). Although they question his dementia at first, Stabler and Beck find their way to a much more calculating suspect (Timothy Adams).
166	5	"Confrontation"	David Platt	Judith McCreary	October 17, 2006	0806	12.98
Stabler and Beck handle a case in which the attacker (Michael Kelly) seems to be coming back to rape his victims again and again. They disagree on how to help a woman (Marin Ireland) who is living in fear. The detectives soon discover that his plan is to impregnate selected women. In order to put him away, they compel a pregnant woman (Kerry O'Malley) to undergo chorionic villus sampling even though her husband (Matthew Arkin) wishes to remain ignorant to the fact that he is not the father.
167	6	"Infiltrated"	David Platt	Dawn DeNoon	October 31, 2006	0809	13.36
Casey Novak is forced to get Olivia Benson, still undercover with the FBI, to come back to New York to testify on behalf of a woman who was raped in a bank. While undercover with an Oregon environmental group, she and her group members (Maria Thayer and Chris Bowers) are injured by an overzealous deputy sheriff (Steven Rishard) and charged with assault. She is eventually released but is questioned about her group's involvement with a murder. She then sets out to clear her group's name and investigates the murdered man. Despite the efforts of his widow (Debra Jo Rupp) trying to shield her daughter from the truth, Benson learns that he was a pedophile with a room under his garage that he used for kidnapping. The local sheriff (Charles Martin Smith) finds two sets of prints at the scene, the murdered man's and those of a ten-year-old girl (Molly Camp) who went missing seven years ago. Benson's case agent (Vincent Spano) tells her that she is indeed spending time with harmless activists and that her undercover work is no longer needed. As she is still unaware of the urgency of Novak's case, she decides to stay and help the FBI find the missing girl. In the end, Benson finds the girl, who had developed Stockholm syndrome and makes it back to New York just in time to testify.
168	7	"Underbelly"	Jonathan Kaplan	Amanda Green	November 14, 2006	0807	14.76
Three teenaged homicide victims with matching tattoos lead Detectives Stabler and Beck to an underage prostitution ring. With the victims' pimp (Michael K. Williams) as the prime suspect, detectives must rely on one of his young girls (Charlie Ray), to testify against him. Benson shows up at Cragen's office but decides not to go back to detective work just yet after seeing how Stabler and Beck are getting along.
169	8	"Cage"	David Platt	Patrick Harbinson	November 21, 2006	0808	14.20
Detectives Stabler and Beck investigate a car accident involving two foster children (Elle Fanning and Khaleel Carter) in which the driver (Marlyne Afflack) was fired from being a foster parent. The accident leads the detectives to foster parents (Margo Martindale and Leo Burmester), a doctor (Ken Howard) who advised them over the phone and some questionable medical practices involving controversial "rebirthing" therapy. As the detectives dig deeper into the case, they discover other gruesome secrets; one of the foster children sets a fire in Beck's living room attempting to commit suicide. This is too much for Dani to handle and she says goodbye to Stabler and the Special Victims Unit.
170	9	"Choreographed"	Peter Leto	Paul Grellong	November 28, 2006	0810	14.64
The body of an attractive woman (Kristine Szabo) with a mysterious cause of death is discovered in Central Park. Detective Stabler begins the investigation by talking to the victim's husband (Chris Sarandon) as his friends (Bob Saget and Catherine Bell) pay a condolence visit. Stabler's investigation unravels a case of drugs, infidelity and an elaborate plot that impacts everyone involved in the troupe. Stabler also discovers that Detective Benson is back in town and she is assigned to be his partner once again.
171	10	"Scheherazade"	David Platt	Amanda Green	January 2, 2007	0802	15.17
Stabler agrees to hear the dying confession of a cancer patient (Brian Dennehy) but first, he and Benson do some digging into what possible crime he could have committed. This leads them to an unsolved case that goes back 47 years. The man is found to be responsible for 21 armed bank robberies, murder, and kidnapping. His daughter (Paget Brewster) refuses to see him in his last days, but as he lies dying she goes to his bedside.
172	11	"Burned"	Eriq La Salle	Judith McCreary	January 9, 2007	0811	14.41
Benson and Stabler investigate a he-said/she-said case as a woman (Michael Michele Williams) accuses her ex-husband (Blair Underwood), a former substance abuser, of rape as the two are in a bitter divorce and custody battle over their 12-year-old daughter (Tiffany Evans).
173	12	"Outsider"	Arthur W. Forney	Paul Grellong	January 16, 2007	0816	14.17
Fin looks into a string of similar assaults in which the victims (Tiffany Pao, Kelli Giddish and Carmen Goodine) were raped and choked. Fin is joined in his investigation by Brooklyn SVU detective Chester Lake (Adam Beach), working a similar case of three women who were not only raped and choked, but also murdered. They interview Kara and her father, who refers the detectives to a Wall Street trader named Oliver Mitsakos. After an initial investigation, Stabler pulls the detectives out due to another rape with the same man described as the perpetrator. This leads them to a successful family (Navid Negahban, Sakina Jaffrey and Pooja Kumar) who disowned their son Henry (Kal Penn) for being an underachiever. Henry is revealed to be the perpetrator and is tracked down & shot by Fin while on a boat attempting to leave the U.S.
174	13	"Loophole"	David Platt	Jonathan Greene	February 6, 2007	0812	13.45
Stabler is injured by a drug-crazed suspect (Bill Goldberg) and Benson follows up on an anonymous letter which leads to an apparent child-pornography case and the testing of pesticides on unwitting apartment tenants. After arresting the landlord (Wayne Duvall), Olivia is exposed to the pesticide and develops medical symptoms similar to those exhibited by the victim (Marquis Rodriguez) and his mother (Karen Olivo). Despite the health risks, an official (Casey Siemaszko) informs the squad that this was done legally. Casey Novak eventually pursues the CEO (Ray Wise) of a pharmaceutical company and his lawyer (James Naughton) in order to challenge a controversial United States Environmental Protection Agency rule that allows intentional dosing of human beings in pesticide experiments.
175	14	"Dependent"	Peter Leto	Ken Storer	February 13, 2007	0815	12.94
After an intruder attacks a mob lawyer (Cary Elwes), murders his wife, and spares his son (Seamus Davey-Fitzpatrick), Benson and Stabler question their daughter (Emily VanCamp). However her wild night of drunken partying leaves her unable to recall her actions, even though her father insists she was at the scene of the crime. Stabler is charged with excessive force when the daughter's boyfriend (Justin Klosky) dies in his custody.
176	15	"Haystack"	Peter Leto	Amanda Green	February 20, 2007	0813	11.94
An overzealous reporter (Kali Rocha) accuses a new mother (Ashley Williams) on television of kidnapping and trying to kill her baby. This turns out to be the last straw for the despondent woman, who promptly commits suicide. Although everyone is under suspicion, including the mother and her ex-husband (Pablo Schreiber), the case takes an unusual emotional toll on Detective Stabler who is drawn into the line of fire by the kidnapper (Dana Ashbrook) and his mother (Marian Seldes).
177	16	"Philadelphia"	Peter Leto	Patrick Harbinson	February 27, 2007	0817	11.73
Benson finally unravels a part of her past when she finds her brother Simon Marsden (Michael Weston) who is suspected of being a rapist by a New Jersey captain (Kim Delaney). This distraction compromises a chase during which the squad tries to apprehend two male rapists (Michael Carbonaro and Roberto Purvis) who rape other men. Benson must meet with Dr. Rebecca Hendrix (Mary Stuart Masterson) to discuss her recent actions.
178	17	"Sin"	George Pattison	Patrick Harbinson	March 27, 2007	0821	12.86
A successful preacher (Tim Daly) is the prime suspect in the murder of a clandestine sexual partner (Kyle Bares), until his wife (Kathy Baker) provides detectives with a taped conversation.
179	18	"Responsible"	Yelena Lanskaya & David Platt	Allison Intrieri	April 3, 2007	0814	11.16
Stabler and Benson are forced to dive into the world of underage drinking when a death leads to high school binge parties and a mother (Laura Leighton) who not only supplies booze to her daughter (Sarah Drew)'s friends but sleeps with one of those friends (Hunter Parrish) as well.: The episode is followed by a public service announcement that reads: 2,449 youths under 21 were killed in alcohol-related traffic fatalities in 2005. That's an average of 7 deaths every day.
180	19	"Florida"	David Platt	Jonathan Greene	May 1, 2007	0818	11.41
When Detective Benson gets into the middle of an investigation of her brother Simon Marsden (Michael Weston), she takes out the stress on a suspect (Josh Casaubon) and gets suspended. Benson talks to Simon's mother (Maggie Burke), his father's coworker (Graham Winton) and a rape victim (Kathryn Hays) and begins to question whether or not she was the product of a rape in the first place. She digs deeper to discover that Simon was the victim of a frame-job by a police officer (Kim Delaney) who is in denial about sexual abuse in her own family.
181	20	"Annihilated"	Peter Leto	Amanda Green	May 8, 2007	0819	10.94
A woman's murder appears to be the result of a professional hit, when her fiancé (Dylan Walsh) receives death threats, apparently resulting from his CIA career. Elliot, investigating this, finds that the man may not be all that he seems; the case takes a shocking turn when the man's wife (Kelly Deadmon) and children (Lucas Delvasto, John D'Leo and Shelby Adamowsky) are all found dead. Meanwhile, Elliot continues to rebuild his relationship with his family.
182	21	"Pretend"	David Platt	Dawn DeNoon	May 15, 2007	0820	12.75
The team investigates the death of a partially clothed teenage boy (Dan Leonard) wearing a leather mask. The detectives discover that the victim's best friend (Michael Welch) is the killer and has a video, showing that the boy's death was the result of a backyard wrestling match gone wrong. The trial ends with the boy's conviction on a lesser charge but then the victim's girlfriend (Misti Traya) fails to show up at the sentencing hearing. When the girlfriend is injured in an attack instigated by the defendant, the case takes a bizarre turn when information surfaces that the girl is far older than she appears and has been defrauding the foster care system for over a decade.
183	22	"Screwed"	Arthur W. Forney	Judith McCreary	May 22, 2007	0822	10.28
Darius Parker (Chris "Ludacris" Bridges) goes on trial for the rape and murder of a woman with any mention of her fourteen-month-old child deemed inadmissible. The case brings Fin under fire from the media and even has Munch and Stabler at odds. Novak prosecutes the trial that brings Stabler and Tutuola, among others, to the stand. Many previous stories are brought into the trial, such as Stabler's daughter Kathleen's DUI, and Benson's illegal money-wiring to her half-brother, Simon Marsden (Michael Weston). It is also revealed that Kathy Stabler, Elliot's wife, is pregnant again.
