= Hayley McFarland =

American actress (b. 1991)

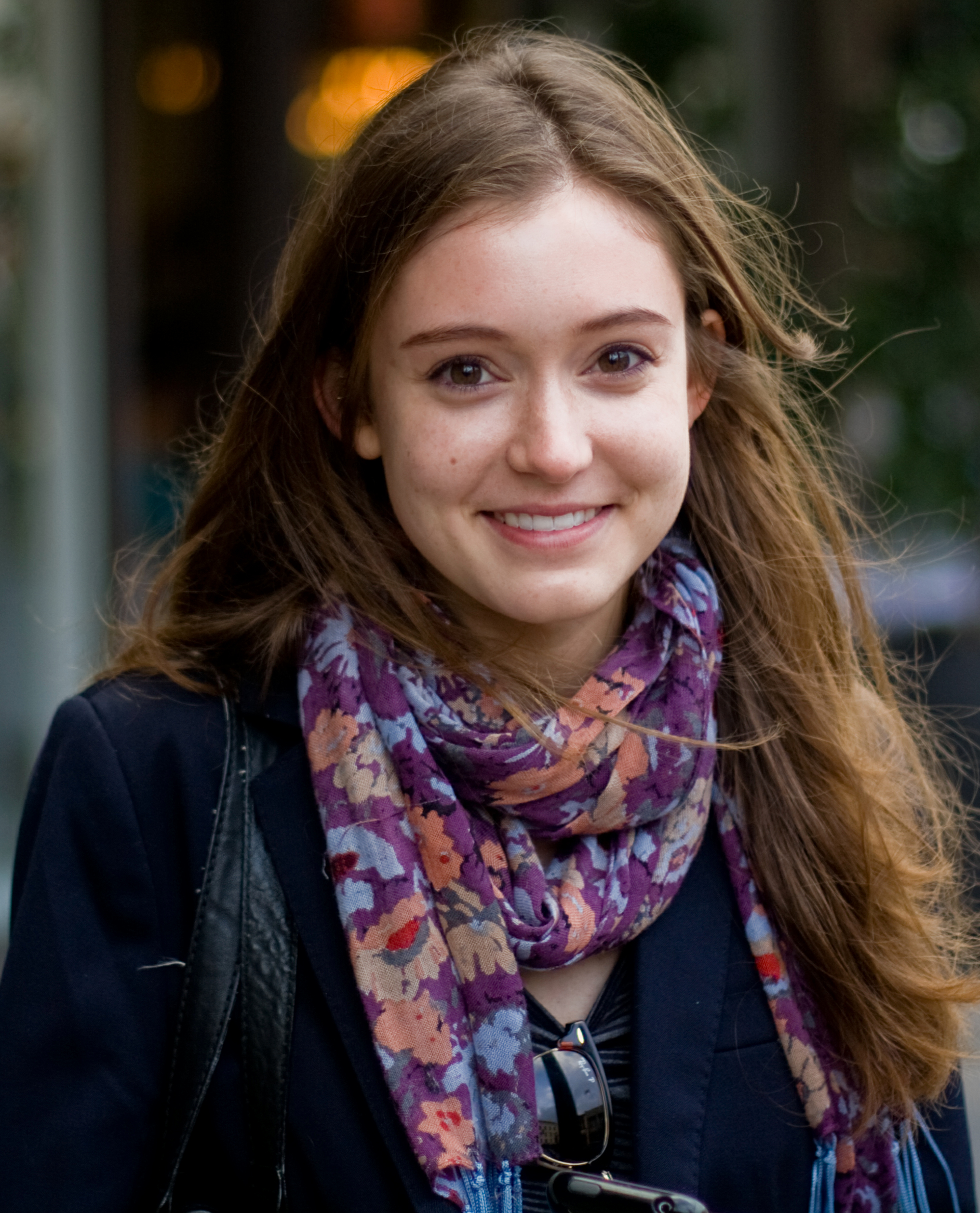
- McFarland in 2011
- Born: March 29, 1991 (age 35); Edmond, Oklahoma, U.S.
- Occupation: Actress
- Years active: 2006–present
- Known for: Lie to Me; The Conjuring

Hayley McFarland (born March 29, 1991) is an American actress. She is best known for portraying Emily Lightman in the Fox crime drama series Lie to Me. In the supernatural horror film The Conjuring, McFarland portrayed Nancy Perron.

== Early life ==
Hayley McFarland was born on March 29, 1991, in Edmond, Oklahoma. She began performing in summer musicals at Oklahoma City's Lyric Theatre. While living in Oklahoma, she studied at Michelle De Long's ACTS Acting Academy, which notes fellow alumni such as Ryan Merriman of Pretty Little Liars fame. De Long is credited with sending a tape of the young actor to a manager in Los Angeles. Despite only being interested in musical theater, after being introduced to the manager, McFarland transitioned into screen acting. In her teens, McFarland made regular trips to audition in Los Angeles.

== Career ==
Her first major role came in the form of an independent film, An American Crime, starring Elliot Page and Catherine Keener. She has appeared in isolated episodes on various TV series, including Gilmore Girls, ER, Criminal Minds, and Law & Order: Special Victims Unit. She was a main character of the crime drama series Lie to Me on Fox, portraying Emily Lightman for all three seasons from 2009 to 2011. McFarland also had a recurring role in the final two seasons of FX crime drama Sons of Anarchy. McFarland has starred in several horror films, including The Conjuring and Agnes.

== Personal life ==
In April 2026, Edmond Outlook magazine referred to comedian and actor Joe Kwaczala as McFarland's boyfriend. They worked together on the film American Comic.

== Filmography ==
List of films and roles
| Year | Title | Role | Notes | Ref. |
|---|---|---|---|---|
| 2007 | An American Crime | Jennie Likens | | |
| 2008 | Winged Creatures | Lori Carline | | |
| 2011 | Eye of the Storm | Poor Little Zombie | Short film | |
| 2013 | The Conjuring | Nancy Perron | | |
| 2016 | The Chaplain | Cole | Short Film | |
| 2021 | Agnes | Agnes | | |
| 2022 | Out of Exile | Dawnette "Dawn" Russell | | |
| 2025 | We're Not Safe Here | Rachel | | |
| 2025 | American Comic | Olivia | | |
| 2026 | Anywhere | Syd | | |

List of television appearances and roles
| Year(s) | Title | Role | Notes | Ref. |
|---|---|---|---|---|
| 2006 | Gilmore Girls | Marcia | 2 episodes: "The Real Paul Anka", "Super Cool Party People" | |
| 2007 | ER | Candice | Episode: "The War Comes Home" | |
| 2008 | Criminal Minds | Katie Owen | Episode: "3rd Life" | |
| 2008 | Pushing Daisies | Nikki Heaps | Episode: "Circus, Circus" | |
| 2009 | 24 | Emily Latham | Episode: "Day 7: 8:00 a.m. – 9:00 a.m." | |
| 2009 | Without a Trace | Addy Gilroy | Episode: "Believe Me" | |
| 2009 | United States of Tara | Petula | 3 episodes: "Aftermath", "Work", "Betrayal" | |
| 2009 | Medium | Jamie Portman | Episode: "New Terrain" | |
| 2009–11 | Lie to Me | Emily Lightman | Main cast; 40 episodes | |
| 2011 | Law & Order: Special Victims Unit | Jenna | Episode: "Smoked" | |
| 2012 | Mad Men | Bonnie | Episode: "Tea Leaves" | |
| 2013–14 | Sons of Anarchy | Brooke Putner | Guest (season 6); Recurring cast (season 7); 11 episodes | |
| 2014 | Grey's Anatomy | Rory Williams | Episode: "You've Got to Hide Your Love Away" | |
| 2024 | The Rookie | Ms. Marcos | Episode: "Secrets and Lies" | |
| 2024 | Scare Tactics | Josie | Episode: "Hospital Hell!" (segment: "Thrill Ride") | |
| 2025 | 1923 | Mary | 2 episodes: "Journey the Rivers of Iron", "Only Gunshots to Guide Us" | |
| 2025 | Tracker | Monica Harper | Episode: "Collision" | |
| 2026 | Strip Law | Mildred Crumbles / Various voices | 2 episodes: "The Bad News Bapples", "We Need to Talk About Heaven" | |
