= Chicago Crossover =

- Law & Order: Special Victims Unit episode
- Sergeants Olivia Benson (Mariska Hargitay) and Hank Voight (Jason Beghe) discussing Voight's illegal interrogation technique.
- Episode no.: Season 16; Episode 7
- Directed by: Steve Shill
- Story by: Warren Leight
- Teleplay by: Ed Zuckerman
- Production code: 16007
- Original air date: November 12, 2014

Guest appearances
- Lou Taylor Pucci as Teddy Courtney/Voight; Danny Mastrogiorgio as George Turner; Mark H. Dold as Bob Clinton; Isabel Shill as Jocelyn Cerpaski; Christian Goodwin as Henry Thorne; Frank Deal as FBI Agent O’Connell; Donnetta Lavinia Grays as Lina Bagley; Sal Rendino as Deputy Warden Barberi; J.T. O'Connor as Don; Joshua Warr as Tombs C.O.; Paul Mauriello as Daddy Bear; Jesse Lee Soffer as Detective Jay Halstead; Sophia Bush as Detective Erin Lindsay; Jason Beghe as Sergeant Hank Voight

Episode chronology
← Previous "Glasgowman's Wrath"	Next → "Spousal Privilege"
- Law & Order: Special Victims Unit season 16

"Chicago Crossover" is the seventh episode of the sixteenth season of the American police procedural-legal drama, Law & Order: Special Victims Unit, and the 350th overall episode of the series. It originally aired on NBC in the United States on November 12, 2014. In this episode, the SVU team meets up with the Intelligence Unit of Chicago P.D. to solve a decades-old child pornography ring case, which is personal for CPD's Detective Erin Lindsay (Sophia Bush).

The episode was written by Ed Zuckerman, Warren Leight, and Dick Wolf, and directed by Steve Shill. This episode marks an unprecedented crossover in Law & Order franchise history where three shows (all three created by Wolf) crossover with one main storyline. The story began in the 7th episode of season 3 "Nobody Touches Anything" of Chicago Fire where a fire victim was found with child pornography. The Fire Department turn the case over to the Chicago Police, who take on the initial investigation that leads them to Manhattan, where the detectives from Chicago P.D. team up with the SVU in "Chicago Crossover". The story concludes in the CPD episode "They'll Have to Go Through Me", where the main suspect returns to Chicago after leaving behind clues in New York. Filming on "Chicago Crossover" began on October 9, 2014, in New York City. NBC began using the hashtag "#CrossoverWeek" in their on-air promos for the three shows' episodes.

"Chicago Crossover" was seen by 10.01 million viewers making the second most viewed program of the night on NBC and the second ranked program in the time slot. Critical response to the SVU episode of the crossover was generally positive, many critics praising the tension-filled scenes and 'fireworks' between lead actors Mariska Hargitay and Jason Beghe, who portrayed Sgts. Olivia Benson and Hank Voight, respectively; Lou Taylor Pucci was also praised for his portrayal of Teddy Courtney.

== Plot ==
The episode starts where the Chicago Fire episode "Nobody Touches Anything", left off—where the CFD firefighters rescued a man from a burning building and in his possession, he held a box full of child pornography, a box that was dropped during Lieutenant Kelly Severide's (Taylor Kinney) attempt to save the man's life. The CFD then turned this evidence over to the Chicago police. Detective Erin Lindsay has a personal stake in the case: her half-brother is involved somehow and in New York City. Benson gets a call from Voight that his team is on a plane to Manhattan to help the SVU solve the case.

Lindsay explains to the SVU about how her half-brother Teddy Courtney (Lou Taylor Pucci) went missing when they were younger and how her mother thought that somehow, he ran away to New York. Benson tells Lindsay that the National Center for Missing and Exploited Children (NCMEC) ran Teddy’s face through their system, and they found more images and concluded that he was connected to a child sex ring. While searching for Teddy, they learn from the NCMEC that another young boy, Henry Thorne (Christian Goodwin), is being victimized on a live stream—although at the time, no one could track down where the feed was originating from. They learn from the photos found in the Chicago fire that the ring is called the "Chess and Checkers Club" and that it originated out of Chicago back in 2004; NCMEC pushing the federal government to shut down the website, but to no avail.

Later, through advanced facial recognition, the detectives discover that Teddy went under the name Teddy Voight, and has a juvenile record, having been arrested for solicitation five years ago. Lindsay explains to Detective Jay Halstead (Jesse Lee Soffer) that they knew Sgt. Voight before. SVU detectives Nick Amaro (Danny Pino) and Amanda Rollins (Kelli Giddish) go to a youth center where Teddy was remanded and learn that Teddy frequently ran away from the center. Security guard George Turner (Danny Mastrogiorgio) doesn't remember Teddy, but Miss Bagley (Donnetta Lavinia Grays) recommends that the detectives talk to Jocelyn Cerpaski (Isabel Shill), who left the center to start a better life. Jocelyn initially doesn't want to talk to the detectives, but she directs them to the piers where Teddy solicits. Rollins and Halstead find him and bring him in.

Lindsay tries to talk to Teddy, but he refuses. Benson tells Lindsay that they have him on narcotics possession. Benson tries to get Teddy to open up about what happened to him by letting him know that another boy is in danger, but he remains silent. Amaro and Rollins go back to Jocelyn, and learn that Teddy assaulted her. Later, Benson and Lindsay push Teddy, reassuring that he raped Jocelyn because his abusers forced him to. Teddy breaks down and admits what he did, reasoning that if he hadn't, the child sex ring would have had someone else hurt her worse. Teddy explains to Benson and Lindsay that there was someone they were all afraid of and that at the youth center, one of the security guards helped him escape—George Turner.

Benson, Halstead and Lindsay go back to the center to pick up Turner for questioning. He tries to run from them, and in the ensuing struggle Lindsay is injured by a passing bicyclist and hospitalized. When she awakes, Voight is at her bedside, vowing to help Teddy and telling her to go back to Chicago. Voight later shows up at SVU and immediately bursts into the interrogation room, where Amaro and Rollins are trying to question Turner. Voight threatens Turner, causing Benson to intervene; she threatens to have Voight arrested if he touches Turner again. However, Benson lets Turner think that she is going to let Voight hurt him in order to scare him into revealing what he knows. Turner tells them some details involving toll fees that their prime suspect had to pay in order to get back into the city. Voight and Benson go to Teddy, who still refuses to remember that part of his life, so they go back to Jocelyn, undercover as Henry's parents in order to get her to talk. They take her back to SVU, where the detectives put her in an interrogation room with Teddy and a live feed of Henry. She remembers that they drove her across a long bridge, that she was blindfolded, and that she heard the sound of tires on metal. She and Teddy also remember a name: Bob Clinton (Mark H. Dold).

The detectives soon learn that Clinton is somewhere on Staten Island, and Benson and Voight rescue Henry and arrest Clinton. Meanwhile, Detectives Amaro and Fin Tutuola (Ice-T) arrest two others that seem to be involved. At the squad room, Rollins comes up with a laptop, showing video of another child who had been abducted by the ring, this time a young girl. Benson and Voight try to lean on Clinton, who asks for full immunity before he divulges anything. Benson decides to lock him up instead.

Hours after Benson sends Clinton to The Tombs, Clinton is shivved in a shower while in protective custody by a Lester Davis, who was awaiting trial on armed robbery. SVU learns that Davis got a phone call from a no-name cell phone purchased in Chicago. Voight was told by Linsday that in Chicago, Andrew Llewellyn (the fire victim who had the child porn photos), and the officer guarding him were shot and killed. Benson comments that their suspect fled back to Chicago.

== Production ==
"Chicago Crossover" was written by Law & Order franchise writer Ed Zuckerman (teleplay), SVU executive producer/show runner Warren Leight and Law & Order: SVU creator Dick Wolf, and was directed by Steve Shill. This episode marks the first episode to credit Dick Wolf as a writer since the 100th episode of SVU, "Control", back in the fifth season. In this episode, Raúl Esparza (Assistant District Attorney Rafael Barba) and newcomer Peter Scanavino (Detective Sonny Carisi) were absent.

=== Concept and writing ===
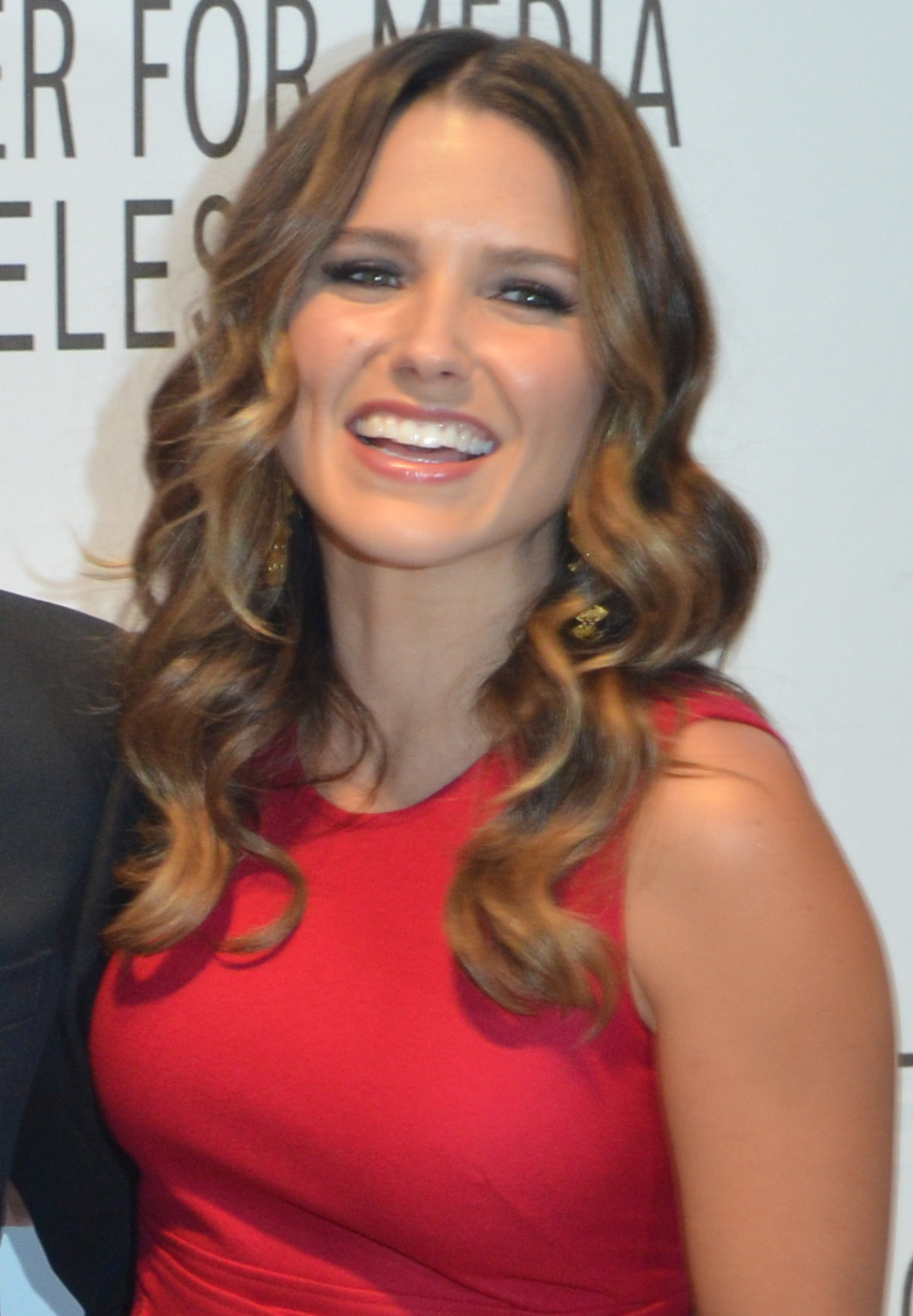
Sophia Bush who portrays Detective Erin Lindsay on Chicago P.D., has previously guest starred as her character in the fifteenth season episode, "Comic Perversions".

In May 2014, NBC President, Robert Greenblatt announced that Chicago P.D., Chicago Fire, and also SVU, could have another crossover episode, after SVU and CPD briefly crossed-over with SVU's fifteenth season's episode, "Comic Perversion" which guest starred Sophia Bush, who portrayed her CPD character, Detective Erin Lindsay; while Ice-T & Kelli Giddish briefly portrayed their characters respectively in the episode "Conventions" of Chicago PD, two episodes which Leight and Olmstead wouldn't call a true 'crossover'.

On September 29, creator Dick Wolf said of the crossover, "Warren Leight and Matt Olmstead are two of the best writers in the business. We wanted to figure out a way to create a crime that connects all three shows. Warren, Matt and I came up with a story that was big and unique enough to transit to all three." SVU showrunner/EP Warren Leight noted the three-show crossover was Wolf's idea, although Leight said that both he and Chicago Fire/PD showrunner/EP Matt Olmstead had their uncertainties about the crossover. Leight admitted, "I think my first reaction was anxiety, I know the fans will like it, but I know how much extra work is involved and also, legitimately these are two different kinds of police shows and I wasn’t sure how the cross-pollination would work."

Olmstead said of crafting the crossover, "What Warren and I did was jump in, I knew what I was going to hand off to him at the end of [Chicago] Fire and he told me what he was going to hand back over to me at PD and then we fine-tuned and figured out the logistics.” Leight explained that each show's writers wrote for their own show and said that he and Olmstead were on the phone a lot for the plotting stages. "We sent the [Chicago PD] script to Warren to vet since he knows the [SVU] characters better than we do," said Olmstead. Leight jumped in, adding, “If there was something I felt was wrong for one of our characters in the PD part, I made my opinions known.” Olmstead assured that it was the same with Leight in writing for the CPD characters: "There was a respectful vetting of both scripts. When I read the SVU script of our characters, it sounded very true, so there weren't any doubts."

Leight and Olmstead, however, worried about having the audience have to tune in to three shows, "That’s a big fear," admits Leight, "But this is still in the Dick Wolf universe where each episode has to stand alone and also link. You don’t want to have a three minute ‘previously on Chicago Fire’ to open up ‘SVU.’ You want that to be as short and clear as possible. Our episode is stand alone yet the baton passes and there are enough unresolved parts for PD to get another hour out of it. That’s an interesting writing challenge – how much to reveal when and how to stage the investigation and the information over 80 minutes. One good thing what we have is that our episode goes right into PD. Our hope that the audience comes and stays for two hours and that we've made it compelling enough for them to do that."

"You want to see Voight and Benson, you want to see Batman and Superman together for an extended period, working through things. So that’s what we’re doing here."

— SVU showrunner Warren Leight to TV Guide.

Olmstead and Leight noted about tension and 'fireworks' between Sgts. Benson and Voight, both showrunners were also anxious to pair the two commanding officers on-screen. “There are two very different types of fireworks that we could be talking about," SVU's Leight started. "They have two very different approaches to interrogations and procedure. I think we all know Voight can be more physical and Olivia is a more empathetic detective. Those kind of fireworks take place in both episodes and they are among the most fun scenes in SVU and CPD.” Olmstead added with Leight, “When the Benson character shows up the first time during a pretty grim investigation there’s a smile on [Voight’s] face, he’s happy to see her. There’s this immediate chemistry, immediate shared affection between two very similar characters. There’s a real bond right away between those two characters." Olmstead said in a separate interview with TV Guide, "More than anybody he's ever encountered, I think he respects this person because it's almost like a female version of Voight," Olmstead says. "When the case is starting to go south on the Chicago side and she calls to check in and says, 'What do you need?' he says, 'I need your help.' And he would never admit that to anybody. He's being vulnerable. And her response is, 'I'll get on the next flight out.' So, they just have an affinity towards each other."

==== Continuing storylines ====
The case is very personal for Detective Lindsay (Bush) because her missing half-brother Teddy (Pucci) might be somehow involved. "It really knocks her sideways," Olmstead says of Lindsay's personal connection to the case. "She admits that she's just trying to keep her head on straight because she has so many competing emotions while trying to be objective and do her job. ... There's some hard-earned advice that Benson is able to impart to Lindsay."

There is a slow-burning relationship between Detectives Lindsay and Halstead, Olmstead teased, "[There will be] further slow burning, because, as has been made clear to them by Voight, he doesn't tolerate in house romances." And showrunner Leight teased about sexual tension in TV Guide on November 11, "Lindsay and Halstead have this unrequited crush on each other, and you have Rollins and Amaro with a down-low affair going on. There's a moment or two when it seems like one group notices something about the other. We tease a little bit with that." Leight adds that going to Chicago will bring out a new side to the characters, particularly Amaro. "[He is] much more physical than he gets to be on our show," he adds.

The cast members of all three shows spoke highly of the event. Pino called the crossover "a Dick Wolf universe, colliding." Mariska Hargitay was excited when she got the script, "For me reading the Chicago PD script, I was very, very excited about it. Sort of not knowing what it was going to be. And he [Jason Beghe] kept saying 'have you read it, it's so great', and then I read it, and I was absolutely thrilled." Kelli Giddish noted how unprecedented a move the three-show crossover was, "People are really going to enjoy seeing us all kind of mix-and-match. And it's really lucky that we've got three shows on the air right now that we can all do that with, I mean that's really cool."

=== Filming ===
The shooting of the SVU episode "Chicago Crossover" began on October 9, 2014 in New York City. SVU cast members Hargitay, Pino, and Giddish shot the CPD conclusion episode starting October 22 in Chicago.

Leight said of the tight filming schedule in Observer, "We had Kelly and Danny in Chicago for four days and Mariska there for two days. Then we had Halstead (Soffer) and Voight (Beghe) here for four days and Lindsay (Bush) here for two days. It made production very difficult and it meant our next [SVU] episode had to be a legal one to allow for scheduling."

=== Casting ===
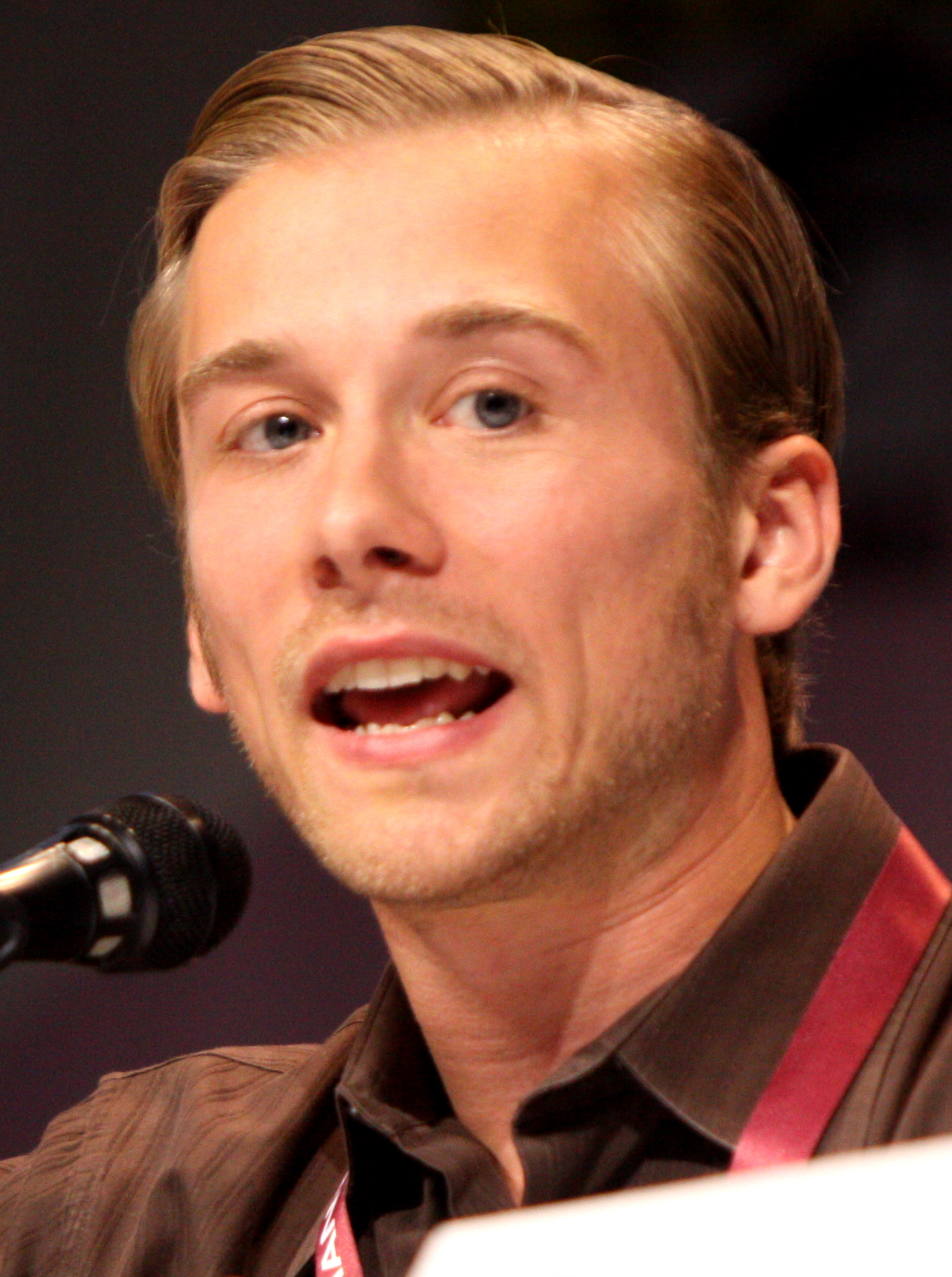
Lou Taylor Pucci was highly praised for his portrayal of drug-addled Teddy Courtney in this episode.

It was announced on September 29, 2014 that three members of Chicago P.D.'s cast would be guest starring in the SVU hour; Sophia Bush (portraying Detective Erin Lindsay), Jesse Lee Soffer (portraying Detective Jay Halstead), and Jason Beghe (portraying Sergeant Henry "Hank" Voight). On November 10, 2014, TV Guide noted that Lou Taylor Pucci would be portraying Lindsay's estranged half-brother, Teddy Courtney. Pucci guest starred in a Warren Leight written episode of Law & Order: Criminal Intent, "Cruise to Nowhere" as Joey Frost.

The showrunners mention in their interviews that the same togetherness the cast showed on-screen, they had it behind the scenes as well. "The most unexpected and rewarding development in filming the crossover episodes was seeing how close the actors from the different shows became," says CPD's Olmstead, "Between set-ups they stuck together as a group and they socialized after wrap. It brought the shows closer." In TV Guide Olmstead continued, "One thing that I didn't really expect was the camaraderie with the actors, you never saw actors standing by themselves, waiting for their line. They were always in groups. They hung out as a group after they filmed. There was a lot of travel and working weekends, but the feedback I got from everybody was what a special event it was for them just as actors. I know that when we do it again — and I'm sure that we'll do it at some point down the road — it will not be a hard sell."

Danny Mastrogiorgio who portrayed George Turner in "Chicago Crossover"; the actor has guest starred on SVU three times before, in the season thirteen episode, "Home Invasions" as a young boy's father, tenth season episode, "Lunacy" as 'the Cabbie Rapist', Orlando McTeer, and in the second season episode "Noncompliance" as Earl Miller/Gilmore as well. Prior to that, Mastrogiorgio has worked with SVU showrunner Warren Leight, guest starring on Law & Order: Criminal Intent as a murderous drug lord named Testarossa in the episode "Purgatory".

== Reception ==
=== Ratings ===
In its original American broadcast on November 12, 2014, "Chicago Crossover" was viewed by 10.01 million viewers and acquired a 2.4 rating/7% share in the age 18–49 demographic. "Chicago Crossover" was the second watched program on NBC that night, retaining more than 95% viewership of its lead-in for the night, The Voice. "Chicago Crossover" was the second ranked program in that timeslot, under ABC's Modern Family, but above Criminal Minds on CBS by 0.1 in the 18-49 age demo.

=== Critical response ===
The crossover in its entirety got extremely positive reviews from both critics and fans alike, praising how the shows were meshed together to make the three-hour crossover along with praising the cast and crew members of the shows as well. Narsimha Chintaluri of TV Fanatic said in a positive review, "It was a bold, and probably complicated, move to tie these three shows together, but the premise definitely delivered a strong episode of SVU." Chintaluri also noted how the characters interacted in scenes, "The interpersonal dynamics were entertaining to be privy too. There were subtle moments, such Rollins and Amaro saying "we get it," after Halstead denied any sort of relationship with Lindsay, and then there were the not so subtle moments where Voight almost simulated raping a suspect to get his point across."

Matt Carter of cartermatt.com gave the episode a "B+" rating, commenting "This story was about chasing a criminal ring doing unspeakable things to New York City, and there were a number of memorable moments that we saw throughout this. Obviously, seeing Benson completely take some of these people (including Voight) to task was a highlight, but there were some very cool moments that came out of seeing most of these people together." Carter compared this season's crossover to last with, "some of the crossovers between “SVU” and “Chicago PD” just didn't feel right, and mostly because we did not know many of the people well enough yet. This hour really changed that, and we felt the weight of the investigation. Plus, it is so much easier to root for many of the people when you know who they are." The showrunners of both shows promised to deliver true crossover, "They were true to their word here as the episode zipped along and every character was successfully integrated into the narrative in a satisfying and in a manner that kept each character completely true to his/her nature. Well done, gentlemen." said Anne Easton of Observer.

Easton continued, "While the intermingling of established SVU and CPD characters was great to watch, it would be a huge oversight not to give a commendation of some sort to actor Lou Taylor Pucci whose performance as Lindsay’s extremely damaged brother, Teddy, really tied the two shows together. His portrayal of the fragile victim, and victimizer, was equal parts cringe worthy and heart wrenching, a combination that is incredibly difficult to pull off. Watching him struggle to come to terms with the direction his life had taken gave the narrative a deeper meaning than had this just been a case of the week." Easton commented on the chemistry between Sgts. Benson (Hargitay) and Voight (Beghe), "They butted heads, they worked things out, and they made things happen, all in the name of protecting their respective turfs and solving the case. It was fun to see these two go toe-to-toe, each pushing the other to explore new tactics in interrogation. Their chemistry, while not really ignited on the personal side, was clearly the type of which ‘work husband and wife’ partnerships are made."
