= Hank Voight =

- Chicago P.D. character
- Jason Beghe as Henry "Hank" Voight in "Let Her Go", Chicago Fire
- First appearance: CF: "Professional Courtesy" (episode 1.03); CM: "Infection: Part II" (episode 5.04); CPD: "Stepping Stone” (episode 1.01); CJ: "Uncertainty Principle” (episode 1.02)
- Created by: Matt Olmstead
- Portrayed by: Jason Beghe

In-universe information
- Full name: Henry Voight
- Gender: Male
- Occupation: Police officer; Police detective; Police Sergeant
- Family: Richard Voight (father; deceased)
- Spouses: Camille Voight (wife; deceased)
- Children: Justin Voight (son; deceased); Erin Lindsay (foster daughter); Candice Shaw (foster daughter); Baby Girl Voight (daughter; deceased)
- Relatives: Olive Voight (daughter-in-law); Daniel Voight (grandson)
- Nationality: American

Police career
- Department: Chicago Police Department: Intelligence Unit; Gang Unit (CF: S1)
- Years of service: 1989–present
- Rank: Sergeant
- Badge No.: 32419

Hank Voight is a fictional character in the television series Chicago P.D. He appeared in a recurring capacity in Chicago Fire and as a main character in Chicago P.D., as the head of the Chicago Police Department's Intelligence Unit, which operates out of the 21st District. Despite Voight's reputation as a suspected dirty cop and for using underhanded methods, he commands his unit's loyalty and respect.

The character was initially introduced in Chicago Fire as a dirty cop who tries to cover up a crime by his son Justin and uses all means necessary to do so, including threatening Fire Lieutenant Matthew Casey, one of the protagonists of Chicago Fire. Voight's circumstances were eventually clarified with the creation of the spin-off Chicago P.D. However, he has a well-documented feud with Casey—as a result of what happened between them—and his interactions with the firefighters of 51 are marked by tension and suspicion, despite the fact that he earns their grudging respect for his dedication in seeking justice for crime victims. Voight carries a SIG Sauer P229 as his sidearm.

== Relationships ==
Hank has a son named Justin whom he bails out in "Professional Courtesy" after he crashes into a van while under the influence of alcohol. As the result of Justin's recklessness, the boy (Mike Duffy) who was in the van is paralyzed from the waist down, stopping him from playing hockey ever again. This incident marks the beginning of the tension between Hank and Fire Lieutenant Matthew Casey (Jesse Spencer).

Hank is widowed; his wife Camille died six years prior to "Now I'm God" of ovarian cancer. Hank's father, Richard, was also a Chicago police officer, was killed when Hank was 8.

While working a joint case with the NYPD Special Victims Unit, Voight and Cpt. Olivia Benson (Mariska Hargitay) establish a bond of trust and friendship despite their differing methods.

Assistant State Attorney Nina Chapman arrives in Chicago at the end of Season 9. After working numerous cases with Voight, she eventually tells Voight that she has feelings for him. Voight's complex past has prevented him from reciprocating those feelings.

== In Chicago Fire ==
This character was first seen in Chicago Fire as an antagonist. Voight's ruthless methods cause friction with Lieutenant Matthew Casey, a firefighter at the nearby Firehouse 51. Casey had arrived on the scene of a serious car crash where the driver, Voight's son Justin, had been drinking. The resulting arrest would have been a DUI with possible repercussions as the passenger in the other car had been paralyzed from the waist down. Voight had tried various methods to stop Casey from filing the report against Justin, beginning with bribery (a new television set for the CFD) and escalating to physical threats towards Casey and his then-fiancée, Dr. Hallie Thomas. Voight attempted to have Casey injured or killed, but was arrested by Detective Antonio Dawson (Jon Seda) in a sting. While in prison he offers Gabriela Dawson (Monica Raymund) information on who shot Antonio, who was working undercover at the time. This was in exchange for a future favor, which Dawson reluctantly accepted. Internal Affairs (I.A.) later releases Voight from prison and promotes him to Sergeant of the Intelligence Unit at CPD. Voight began working with Dawson and Detective Juiliet "Jules" Willhite (Melissa Sagemiller) to investigate a series of murders relating to pharmacy nurses. The case was related to a drug dealer named Thomas Cobb, whom Voight killed to protect Casey. Unfortunately, Hallie was murdered after accidentally discovering a drug operation at the clinic she worked at.

Later in the series, he investigates a gang drive-by shooting which claimed the life of a young girl. Working alongside Dawson and Detective Erin Lindsay (Sophia Bush), Voight uses firefighter Joe Cruz's brother, Leon, who had former ties to the gang, as part of a sting. The operation ended with the successful capture of the intended gang lord, but also the deaths of two gang members.

In "Category 5", when Voight wants Casey's help with an investigation into Jack Nesbitt, Casey turns him down, indicating there are still tensions between them. Casey eventually agrees to get some intel after he himself notices something was not right. In the season 3 finale, Gabriela discovers that Casey has gone missing.

== In Chicago P.D. ==
It is common knowledge in the Chicago police department that Voight is a suspected dirty cop for being associated with unscrupulous individuals in Chicago's underworld, breaking police protocol and taking bribes. It's revealed Voight has now and then outright committed and covered up crimes. However, despite his ruthlessness and his morally ambiguous and underhanded approach to police work, Voight is a veteran who is determined in getting the job done, is extremely dedicated to the victims of his cases, goes out of his way to protect and help vulnerable young people, and does have his fellow cops' and Chicago's best interests at heart. It is revealed that he is working with Internal Affairs using his dirty cop reputation as part of an operation to bring down heavy hitters in Chicago's crime world.

Prior to his arrest in 2012, Voight served in the Chicago PD's Gang Unit for almost 15 years. He has worked with his long-time best friend, Detective Alvin Olinsky (Elias Koteas), who later transfers to Intelligence, and Detective Jimmy Shi (Mark Dacascos), who now heads up a deep undercover vice squad in Chinatown. It is revealed that a number of years ago, after the death of Olinsky's partner, Eddie Penland, Voight, Shi and Olinsky took the murderer, Browning, out to the docks and killed him by taking him "for a boat ride."

Voight has a strained relationship with his son, Justin Voight. This may be due to the fact that his job in CPD was demanding and occupied most of his time. Justin acts out (usually by drinking and driving or fighting in bars) and hangs out with the wrong crowd. More recently, Justin was involved as an accessory to the murder of a rival gang member by his corrupt friend Joe Catalano. Voight learns from Antonio Justin's involvement was that of an innocent pawn and allows the case to be buried. Voight then takes Justin out and forces him to enlist in the United States Army to keep him out of trouble. Voight then kills Catalano by drowning him in the river.

While Voight struggles with his relationship with his own son, he has a tendency to help vulnerable young people. He took Erin Lindsay under his wing (and became her legal guardian) when she was a teenager and got her to stay away from drugs. She, in return, became his C.I. and later joined the CPD. More recently, he helped a 13-year-old boy named D'Anthony get out of the gang culture his older cousin forced him into. He later gives D'Anthony's aunt $4,000 to look after his basic needs.

== Season 2 ==
Voight learns that he is going to be a grandfather when he meets Olive, who got pregnant by Justin before he enlisted. In "An Honest Woman" Voight is beaten and kidnapped along with Olive by two criminals who threaten to kill Olive if Voight does not open his safe. It was revealed that earlier, she had run her mouth to an old friend of hers and confessed that Justin had told her about his father's secret stash. Then later, her friend went behind her back and betrayed her. The friend ended up telling other people about Voight's money, and one of these guys approached Olive with a knife. He cut her, but not deep enough to actually hurt the baby. Just so she knew he was prepared to cut her child out of her if she didn't help them set up Voight. Hank tracks all the people involved, starting with painfully interrogating the friends, and threatening one of the assailants. After one of the assailants was killed by his colleague, Hank arrests the man and nearly kills him but settled for beating him and letting him be processed. At the end, he gives Justin the ring that formerly belong to his mother (that was stolen in the robbery but recovered) and encourages him to propose to Olive.

Hank is friends with the 21st District's Desk Sergeant Trudy Platt (Amy Morton), and has a decent working relationship with District Commander Ron Perry (Robert Ray Wisdom), who had "six hundred reasons why he didn't want [Voight] to run Intelligence, but one reason why"—because he got results. However, his relationship with Cmdr. Perry's successor, Cmdr Fischer (Kevin J. O'Connor), is not nearly as amicable.

In "Chicago Crossover", an episode of Law & Order: Special Victims Unit, he interrupts an interrogation handled by SVU detectives Nick Amaro (Danny Pino) and Amanda Rollins (Kelli Giddish), to do his own way of interrogation (beating the suspect to tell what that person knows). Benson stops him and threatens to arrest him, but along the way she allows him to. During the course of the case, the two of them are able to strike up a friendship.

In "The Three Gs", after working on the human trafficking case, he threatens the officer that filed an official complaint against Sean Roman. He offers him to go to a dentist under his financial help or threatens to beat him up.

In "Daydream Believer", he threatens to beat serial killer Greg Yates (Dallas Roberts) to death after he kidnaps and murders Nadia Decotis (Stella Maeve), Intelligence's civilian administrator, and when he saw the crime scene of his two victims in the apartment building. At the end, when Yates was in holding, Hank relieves the corrections officer of his duty and roughs Yates up, insisting he must feel what his victims went through and never let his guard down.

At the end of "There's My Girl", he demotes Kevin Atwater following an IAB investigation after he leaves a soda can with the suspect that leads to his suicide and promotes Officer Kim Burgess to replace him.

In "Born Into Bad News", he shows his concern for Erin Lindsay when she begins going back to the same person that she once was, and when her mother, Bunny, starts to show up back in Lindsay's life (hinting at the rivalry between the two). At the end, when he is pleading for Lindsay not to quit the department, she still sticks with her decision for her mother to step in.

In "Start Digging", Voight is offered a meritorious promotion to lieutenant by Commander Emma Crowley (Barbara Eve Harris) and the CPD brass as part of the new Chicago Police Superintendent's reorganization of the department that includes getting officers like Voight off the streets. However, before Voight could either accept or decline the promotion, his son, Justin, is assaulted and later dies of his injuries. Voight goes on a revenge mission using whatever means necessary to find Justin's murderer. He has friends find and take the murderer Kevin Bingham to him, where he forces him to dig a hole and executes him. In "The Silos", he is brought back to the silos by Commander Emma Crowley and Internal Affairs detectives, to see if they can recover the body and get him to confess. When no body is found, he is quickly released and goes back on duty. It was later revealed that Lindsay and Olinsky had moved the body prior to I.A. getting there.

In "Grasping for Salvation", a gun that was used in the murder of a boy was connected to a 17-year-old case that he and his old partner Detective (now Lieutenant) Denny Woods had solved. When he found out that Voight was investigating the case, he brings him up to the review board for disobeying a direct order. And when the suspect that Voight and Woods arrested was innocent, Voight tried to have him released. It was later revealed that Woods had altered evidence to get him in prison.

== Season 5 ==
In the premiere "Reform", he sees a psychiatrist after Lindsay leaves CPD to join the FBI. He has difficulty working with Lieutenant Denny Woods after he became the new independent auditor. He forms an alliance to Alderman Ray Price, when he becomes entangled in an investigation that involved Detective Halstead.

In "Promise", he sends a gang leader (where his niece became one of the victims of a serial rapist and killer) information about a killer's identity and where he lives in order for him to exact revenge.

In "Snitch", he became suspicious of Dawson when he was seen with Assistant State's Attorney Steve Kot in the parking lot. He told Olinsky to keep an eye on him and that he doesn't trust him.

In "Fallen", he manages to get Woods' suspicions on him.

In "Monster", he suspects that Ruzek was being a mole when Halstead gets investigated by Internal Affairs and when he asks Platt about the missing money. Olinsky gets Ruzek with him to take him to meet his "CI" but instead meets Voight, discovering that he was the mole.

In "Rabbit Hole", Voight is angry about the evidence against him. While he can't do anything about the charges against him, Voight manages to conspire with Ruzek to take down Woods. With the meeting between Ruzek and Woods over, it was revealed Voight was there watching.

In "Chasing Monsters", Voight is seen standing over the bridge overlooking a crime scene where the police are busy investigating below, when Olinsky arrives to meet Voight, who says "It's what we thought" and suggests they wait it out and get in touch with Lindsay to give her a heads up, as to what is going on. Olinsky assures him that he did the right thing. Denny Woods reveals that a supermarket was breaking ground on the old railroad property by a bridge but it was halted when builders found some human remains. They identified the remains as Kevin Bingham, the man who murdered Voight's son, Justin. Woods says the crime lab is working overtime to clear Voight's name in any wrongdoing and he has brought in the FBI and all hands on deck after everything Hank has been through. At the end of the episode, Voight sits at the bar where Woods finds him and orders him a drink. Denny tells him they found a slug with Bingham's body, but it turns out the slug matches the one that was shot at police during a robbery a few years back and it turns out, Voight was the one who made the arrest, but the gun was never recovered. Woods says they are getting closer and the way he sees it, it's only a matter of time.

In "Ghosts", it was revealed that Voight has connections to the Ivory Tower.

In "Payback", he gets the name of the witness, Ruben, from the Bingham investigation. In his own car, he sees the witness and an unknown man in what appears to be a transaction. He waits for the witness to leave, then goes to the second person involved. It turns out that Ruben was paying off his debt. He goes to find dirt on him but soon finds that he was a recovering addict trying to turn his life around and he was unable to go after him.

In "Saved", he witnesses a girl, Hannah Cates, from his past getting into an unknown SUV with a man she met in the alley. He gives chase but he had to turn the car around when he hears gunshots coming from a local credit union building. He and Ruzek have just walked into a robbery in progress. But during the investigation, surveillance photos surface showing Hannah holding the gun. He assumes that she was forced into doing these crimes when almost everybody starts to doubt her. Like Lindsay, Hannah had a hard life but apparently she was on the wrong road and it was Voight's wife Camille, not Voight himself, who passed his card to Hannah. While barricading a car dealership building, Voight decides to go into the car dealership to handle Mike and Hannah himself. He's realized that she turned to Mike when he (and her aunt and everyone else) were not there for her. But before he can say more to convince Hannah to give up, Mike drags Hannah outside, provokes the waiting CPD to open fire, and both of them are shot dead in an apparent suicide-by-cop. Voight holds Hannah's body and apologizes. Later, over a drink, he tells Olinsky about how Camille was one of Hannah's teachers. After Camille's illness, Voight had been checking in on Hannah until his own son Justin died, and then he forgot — so he blames himself for her death.

In "Homecoming", Voight goes to Wood's home to broker a deal by confessing to the Bingham murder in order to get Olinsky, with ASA James Osha, there in person. But before he does so, Voight gets a message that Olinsky had been stabbed and rushes to Chicago Med where Olinsky had been taken. Upon arriving, he sees Olinsky being rushed by doctors to surgery and while bleeding out Olinsky tells him that he will take care of it himself. While waiting to see how Olinsky was doing, a surgeon tells him that he has died. Voight broke the news to the rest of his team in the Chicago Med waiting room. Voight found a confused James Osha, who just wanted to know why Voight had blown out and got an earful blaming him for what had happened. Voight accused him of screwing Olinsky by prosecuting his case, before storming into the jail director's office the next morning and giving him an even angrier tirade. Upon finding out who the killer was, by a corrupt corrections officer, Voight beat him up in a storage closet and left him bleeding, claiming the man had tried to attack him. Antonio did not buy the story, but Voight told him that if he didn't he could recuse himself from the investigation. The money that was left in the guard's bank account traces back to an Alberto Flores, who, through being beaten into talking by Voight, reveals the name of a man from the Cali Cartel named Carlos DeLeon. In the warehouse, Voight orders Antonio to go a different way from him so that he can track down Carlos himself, and confronts the other man on the roof.

The unarmed Carlos begs for his life, but Voight shoots him twice anyway and says Carlos was reaching for a gun. But the two witnesses immediately exclaim that Voight shot the man ‘in cold blood’. Voight gets a phone call from Osha just before he offers his own story to his department superiors when the accusations became public. Meanwhile, Woods calls Voight wanting another private conversation. It was revealed to be a vendetta that was motivated by Voight leaving him out to dry in "Grasping for Salvation". When Woods mention that another ‘witness’ was there when the murder had occurred, it was later revealed that Voight knows all about Woods' new witness and how Woods just paid her off. It turns out that it was a setup and Internal Affairs shows up to his house. Voight lets them in so he can be arrested. Woods is hauled off in handcuffs, and Voight meets both the faux witness and Osha outside to thank them for their help. After this outcome, Voight drowns his miseries in a bottle and apologizes to a photo of Olinsky before breaking down on the roof. The episode ends with him screaming in pain.

== Season 6 ==
In the premiere "New Normal", he was briefly suspended by Deputy Superintendent Katherine Brennan for the shooting of Carlos DeLeon. While the investigation continues, he continues to help Ruzek with the investigation of people overdosing for bad drugs. At the end, Voight formed an unofficial alliance with Brennan after she agreed to clear Alvin Olinsky's name. Though Voight was asked, by Alvin's wife, not to show up at his best friend's memorial, he did make it possible for Meredith Olinsky to collect her husband's pension.

In "Bad Boys", he had Olinsky exonerated for his arrest last season.

In "Descent", he finds out that Antonio was addicted to painkillers when he witnessed him buying pills from a drug dealer. And at the end, after capturing the person responsible for kidnapping Antonio's daughter, he and Ruzek let Antonio beat him and things went sideways when he pushes him out of the window to his death.

In "Brotherhood", before other officers respond to the scene, he tells Antonio to go and tell Ruzek to let him take the rap but it didn't fall into play when Ruzek offered to take the blame. He was infuriated by what he had done and almost got into an altercation with him.

In "The Forgotten", his distrust towards Kelton grows more from "Trust" when he shut down the investigation of a serial killer that resulted the death of his longtime informant. It got out of control to the point that he got into an altercation with the detective responsible for shooting the killer.

In "Pain Killer", he and Ray Price were targeted by a criminal that Voight investigated prior getting in Intelligence.

In "What Could Have Been", he lets Ray Price take the fall for his wife when she killed Burgess's boyfriend and a reverend to protect her daughter. The two share drinks in a cell acknowledging that Price was so close to winning the mayoral election.

In "Confession", he contacts Platt's old friend who works in journalism and shares that Kelton had covered up an investigation that allowed a serial killer to kill more victims, and convinced the detective working on that case to come forward. At the end, it didn't go his way when Deputy Superintendent Brennan took the blame for Kelton and resigned.

In "Reckoning", Platt informs Voight, Ruzek, and Dawson that Internal Affairs had taken over the investigation as Kelton's way of trying to take down his unit. He vowed to fight back. Voight visits Brennan's home and confirms that Kelton is coming after the unit. Given 36 hours until election is over, he was given Kelton's weak link; a gangbanger by the name of Wilson Young as his "fix it". He assembles his unit to find him and take down Kelton. He takes it off book when Kelton directs them to a double homicide that homicide stalled. It took a turn when Young was found dead. He suspected that Kelton had something to do with his death when he shows to up to the crime scene and confronting him about knowing him, which he denies. He shoves Ruzek into the stairwell, ordering him to not go through with it as he is not Alvin. As he stands firm with his decision and leaves, he punches a wall frustrated that there is nothing to be done. Halstead confronts him about being in the dark and tells him that one day that he will run the unit and leaves, leaving Halstead confused and frustrated. At the end, though Kelton wins the election and becomes Mayor-elect, he is found shot dead that night in his own home and Voight is seen driving away from the scene.

== Season 7 ==
At the start of Season 7, in "Doubt", as Kelton's corpse is taken away to be autopsied by the Medical Examiner and, due to still being the Superintendent of the CPD and Mayor-elect, given final salutes by his former department as he's taken away, acting Superintendent Crawford orders a full investigation to find out who murdered Kelton. Voight had been at Kelton's the day before the murder to try one last time to talk him down and was refused, and had been trying to help Antonio with his drug problem, so he couldn't be at Kelton's when he was shot. Further investigation into a former CPD cop that was laid off a year ago and died of a heart attack two weeks prior to Kelton's murder soon gives Voight the real killer.

It turns out that it wasn't Voight who shot and killed Kelton to finally stop his sinister plans, it was former CPD Deputy Superintendent Katherine Brennan, who had used the deceased CPD officer's car and gun to go after Kelton and shoot him dead, knowing full well that Kelton's plans for the Mayor's office would destroy Chicago and that he had to be terminated before he could take the oath of office, believing Chicago is better off without that scumbag.

Voight intended to let Brennan commit suicide in her dress blues to avoid facing punishment for killing her former superior, but Brennan is arrested by Halstead and Upton before she could carry out her intent, thinking that Voight called them to arrest her and betrayed her. Voight confronts Halstead and tells him that if he refuses to do as he's told and keeps interfering in Voight's business, tells him to get the hell out of the precinct before storming off in fury. With Kelton dead and his plans for the Mayor's office buried with him, Voight and his Intelligence Unit are able to remain a part of the Chicago Police Department instead of being disbanded.

=== List of assignments ===
- Detective, Chicago PD Gang Unit (c. 1995) – November 14, 2012
- Jailed for harassment and attempted murder (November 14, 2012 – May 1, 2013)
- Squad Commander, Chicago PD 21st District (Intelligence Section) (May 15, 2013 – present)

=== Ranks ===
- Officer
- Detective
- Sergeant

=== Partners ===
- Detective Jimmy Shi, Chicago PD Gang Unit (Mark Dacascos)
- Detective Denny Woods (formerly Lieutenant) (Mykelti Williamson)
- Detective Alvin Olinsky, Chicago PD Gang & Intelligence Unit (Elias Koteas)
- Detective Antonio Dawson, Chicago PD Intelligence Unit (Jon Seda)
- Officer Adam Ruzek, Chicago PD Intelligence Unit (Patrick John Flueger)

== Critical commentary ==
Lloyd Farley, writing for Collider, called Voight "the worst cop character on TV." He pointed to how Voight, after his son drove drunk and paralyzed a 16-year-old in a car accident, attempted to bribe Matthew Casey of the Chicago Fire Department to prevent him from filing the report that would see his son charged. When his bribery attempt fails, Voight attempts to have Casey killed and is arrested in a sting operation. Internal Affairs later releases him and promotes him, which Farley said set a dangerous precedent in the series. He also noted how Voight killed another man in retribution for his son's murder, and lets another man take the fall for it when the man's DNA is discovered on the corpse. He noted that Voight was willing to make his team engage in immoral acts for his own gain, and commented that Voight appeared to believe in morality "while completely disregarding it".

== Appearances and crossovers ==
He has appeared on Chicago Fire before Chicago P.D. even started, to get more information on investigations, and on Law & Order: Special Victims Unit to assist. He also appears on Chicago Justice to testify.

- Chicago Fire(season 1):
  - "Professional Courtesy" (October 24, 2012)
  - "One Minute" (October 31, 2012)
  - "Hanging On" (November 7, 2012)
  - "Rear View Mirror" (November 14, 2012)
  - "Nazdarovya!" (February 13, 2013)
  - "Retaliation Hit" (May 1, 2013)
  - "Let Her Go" (May 15, 2013)
- Chicago Fire(season 2):
  - "Rhymes with Shout" (November 26, 2013)
  - "You Will Hurt Him" (December 3, 2013)
  - "A Rocket Blasting Off" (March 11, 2014)
  - "A Dark Day (1)" (April 29, 2014)
- Chicago Fire(season 3):
  - "Nobody Touches Anything" (November 11, 2014)
  - "We Called Her Jellybean" (April 28, 2015)
  - "Category 5" (May 5, 2015)
  - "Spartacus" (May 12, 2015)
- Law & Order: Special Victims Unit (season 16):
  - "Chicago Crossover" (November 12, 2014)
  - "Daydream Believer" (April 29, 2015)
- Chicago Fire(season 4):
  - "A Taste of Panama City" (October 20, 2015)
  - "Sharp Elbows" (November 24, 2015)
- Law & Order: Special Victims Unit: "Nationwide Manhunt" (February 10, 2016)
- Chicago Med: "Guilty" (March 29, 2016)
- Chicago Fire: "Some Make It, Some Don't" (January 3, 2017)
- Chicago Fire: "Deathtrap" (March 1, 2017)
- Chicago Justice: "Fake" (March 1, 2017)
- Chicago Justice: "Uncertainty Principle" (March 5, 2017)
- Chicago Justice: "See Something" (March 7, 2017)
- Chicago Fire: "Hiding Not Seeking" (March 8, 2018)
- Chicago Med: "Backed Against the Wall" (October 17, 2018)
- Chicago Fire: "What I Saw" (February 20, 2019)
- Chicago Fire: "Infection Part 1" (October 16, 2019)
- Chicago Med: "Infection Part 2" (October 16, 2019)
