= The Cold Lands =

- Film poster
- Directed by: Tom Gilroy
- Written by: Tom Gilroy
- Produced by: Philipp Engelhorn; Andrew Goldman; Paul Mezey; Michael Raisler
- Starring: Silas Yelich; Lili Taylor; Peter Scanavino
- Cinematography: Wyatt Garfield
- Edited by: Julia Bloch
- Music by: Hahn Rowe
- Distributed by: Cinereach
- Release date: February 2013 (Berlin International Film Festival)
- Running time: 101 minutes
- Country: United States
- Language: English

The Cold Lands is a 2013 drama film directed by Tom Gilroy. It stars Silas Yelich as Atticus Garfield, Lili Taylor as his mother Nicole, and Peter Scanavino as Carter.

The film premiered in February 2013 at the Berlin Film Festival and was screened at various festivals throughout 2013 and 2014.

== Plot ==
After 11-year-old Atticus Garfield's (Silas Yelich) mother Nichole (Lili Taylor) dies suddenly, Atticus runs away from home to live in the Catskills by himself, surviving on whatever he can find. While dealing with his mother's death and living alone in the wilderness, Atticus encounters a hippie named Carter (Peter Scanavino), who sells necklaces at festivals and lives in his car. The two become dependent on each other, though neither is comfortable with the alliance.

== Cast ==
- Silas Yelich as Atticus Garfield
- Lili Taylor as Nicole
- Maggie Low as Maggie
- Peter Scanavino as Carter
- Nick Sandow as Foreman
- John Ventimiglia as Jackson
- Trace Henderson as Addison
- Jonathan Gatt as Cashier
- Deb Monteith as EMT
- Peter Rufa as Grillman

== Reception ==
On review aggregator Rotten Tomatoes, the film holds an approval rating of 64% based on 11 reviews, with an average rating of 6.35/10. On Metacritic, the film has a weighted average score of 66 out of 100, based on 6 critics, indicating "generally favorable reviews".

The A.V. Club reviewer Emily VanDerWerff gave The Cold Lands a B− rating, stating, "There are the bones of the stereotypical “loser has his life turned around by a kid” story here, but Gilroy takes all of this to a more realistic, more interesting place, and he manages to find an ending for the story that offers a touch of optimism but doesn't feel like a cheat."

=== Accolades ===
- Nashville Film Festival – 2013, Special Jury Prize – Promising Actor (Silas Yelich)
- São Paulo International Film Festival – 2013, Best Feature Film (Nominated)

== Soundtrack ==
Michael Stipe has worked with Director/Screenwriter Tom Gilroy on a variety of projects for decades. Stipe agreed to create the soundtrack for The Cold Lands, which was his first work since R.E.M. disbanded in 2011. However, the final original score heard in the film was composed by Hahn Rowe, known for his work with the band Hugo Largo. The song heard in the opening and closing credits is "Rhymes of an Hour" by Mazzy Star.
