= Chicago P.D. season 2 =

Chicago P.D.
- Season 2
- Chicago P.D. Season 2 DVD cover
- Showrunners: Matt Olmstead; Michael Brandt; Derek Haas; Dick Wolf
- No. of episodes: 23

Release
- Original network: NBC
- Original release: September 24, 2014 – May 20, 2015

Season chronology
- ← Previous; Season 1 Next → Season 3

The second season of Chicago P.D., an American police drama television series with executive producer Dick Wolf, and producers Derek Haas, Michael Brandt, and Matt Olmstead, began airing on September 24, 2014, at 10:00 p.m. Eastern/9:00 p.m. Central, and concluded on May 20, 2015 on the NBC television network. The season contained 23 episodes.

== Cast and characters ==
=== Regular ===
- Jason Beghe as Sergeant Henry "Hank" Voight
- Jon Seda as Detective Antonio Dawson
- Sophia Bush as Detective Erin Lindsay
- Jesse Lee Soffer as Detective Jay Halstead
- Patrick John Flueger as Officer Adam Ruzek
- Marina Squerciati as Officer Kim Burgess
- LaRoyce Hawkins as Officer Kevin Atwater
- Amy Morton as Desk Sergeant Trudy Platt
- Brian Geraghty as Officer Sean Roman
- Elias Koteas as Detective Alvin Olinsky

=== Recurring ===
- Stella Maeve as Nadia DeCotis
- Kevin J. O'Connor as Commander Fischer
- Markie Post as Barbara "Bunny" Fletcher
- Samuel Hunt as Greg "Mouse" Gerwitz
- Chris Agos as Assistant State's Attorney Steve Kot
- Bailey Chase as DEA Agent David Lang
- Nick Gehlfuss as Dr. Will Halstead
- Robert Wisdom as Commander Ron Perry

=== Crossover characters ===
- Kara Killmer as Paramedic Sylvie Brett
- Eamonn Walker as Battalion Chief Wallace Boden
- Charlie Barnett as Paramedic in Charge Peter Mills
- Monica Raymund as Firefighter Gabriela Dawson
- Mariska Hargitay as Sergeant Olivia Benson
- Danny Pino as Detective Nick Amaro
- Ice-T as Detective Fin Tutuola
- Kelli Giddish as Detective Amanda Rollins
- Peter Scanavino as Detective Dominick "Sonny" Carisi, Jr.
- Jesse Spencer as Lieutenant Matthew Casey
- David Eigenberg as Lieutenant Christopher Herrmann
- Randy Flagler as Firefighter Harold Capp
- Joe Minoso as Firefighter/Chauffeur Joe Cruz
- Christian Stolte as Firefighter Randy "Mouch" McHolland

== Episodes ==
No. overall	No. in season	Title	Directed by	Written by	Original release date	Prod. code	U.S. viewers (millions)
16	1	"Call It Macaroni"	Mark Tinker	Matt Olmstead	September 24, 2014	201	8.51
Voight is questioned about Jin's murder, and Internal Affairs tries to focus blame on him. The Intelligence Unit is not supposed to look into the case, but do so anyway. It is revealed later that Jin himself was working with Internal Affairs, and that may be what got him killed. Meanwhile, a routine undercover operation becomes anything but when the armored truck Intelligence was tailing is robbed and a piece of evidence in a murder case is stolen, which leads to Olinsky facing off with a face from his past, and Burgess meets her new partner, recently transferred Sean Roman, only for tensions to rise between them.
17	2	"Get My Cigarettes"	Arthur W. Forney	Craig Gore & Tim Walsh	October 1, 2014	202	6.63
A series of gruesome murders by a shotgun killer gets personal for Voight, because one of the victims was a close friend of his.
18	3	"The Weigh Station"	Nick Gomez	Michael Batistick	October 8, 2014	203	6.67
Following a shooting at a bar targeting Halstead, he is placed under protective custody, which he is not pleased about. Imprisoned Polish mobster Oskar Bembenek, who holds a grudge against Halstead for killing his brother, is the prime suspect. As the bodies pile up, Voight and the rest of the Intelligence Unit race against time to find out who else is on Bembenek's hit list and take the assassins down. Meanwhile, Lindsay's mother is getting married, and wants to be a part of her life again, which she refuses.
19	4	"Chicken, Dynamite, Chainsaw"	Reza Tabrizi	Mo Masi	October 15, 2014	204	6.78
An alderman's daughter and her friend are kidnapped for ransom. Platt gets Roman and Burgess to host a gun return fair but end up receiving a gun that might have been used in an unsolved homicide. It is revealed that Dawson's marriage might be in jeopardy and has an effect on his family when his daughter visits.
20	5	"An Honest Woman"	Mark Tinker	Michael Weiss	October 22, 2014	205	6.85
The Intelligence unit investigates a suspicious case when Voight and his son's pregnant girlfriend Olive are attacked and kidnapped at gunpoint. The gunmen take everything that Voight kept in his secret safe. Meanwhile, Burgess and Roman try to find a person that stole a police badge. Elsewhere, Dawson goes undercover to take down a criminal.
21	6	"Prison Ball"	Sanford Bookstaver	Eduardo Javier Canto & Ryan Maldonado	November 5, 2014	206	6.15
Ruzek and Atwater go undercover as prison inmates to work the case of a ten-year-old girl's murder, while Voight and Olinsky follow up on a lead about the shooting. Burgess and Roman show three boys around the district thinking they are part of the Police Explorers program, only to realize that's not quite the case.
22	7	"They'll Have to Go Through Me"	Sanford Bookstaver	Story by : Dick Wolf & Matt Olmstead; Teleplay by : Maisha Closson	November 12, 2014	207	9.54
The intelligence unit is joined by SVU detectives Benson, Rollins and Amaro to solve the case of a pedophile ring. This episode concludes a crossover with Chicago Fire and Law & Order: Special Victims Unit that begins on "Nobody Touches Anything" and continues on "Chicago Crossover". It is included on the Chicago Fire Season 3 and Law & Order: Special Victims Unit Season 16 DVD sets.
23	8	"Assignment of the Year"	Nick Gomez	Mick Betancourt	November 19, 2014	208	7.29
Dawson's after hours private security job takes a bad turn when the man he was protecting is killed, which could also cost him his job as the client turns out to be a diamond smuggler. Voight and the rest of the Intelligence Unit go to great lengths to solve the crime and save him. They catch the killer, but not the victim's wife who devised the plan. To save Dawson's badge, Voight and Olinsky resort to falsify the documents of an investigation into the victim.
24	9	"Called in Dead"	Alik Sakharov	Craig Gore & Tim Walsh	December 10, 2014	209	6.71
When Nadia's friend almost overdoses at Lindsay's home, Lindsay learns that she took heroin created in a lab at a strip club. The Intelligence Unit conducts an unsanctioned drug bust, and get a couple of arrests. But when the criminal bosses kidnap Olinsky's wife to get the drug back, Olinsky and Voight take care of the problem in their own way, and they realize the criminals have inside information. They follow the thread to a judge's corrupt secretary. Meanwhile, Lindsay continues to consider leaving the Intelligence Unit. Burgess has to cope with Roman's ex-partner and girlfriend Jenn Cassidy (Spencer Grammer) who is now a K-9 officer. Later, while Roman and Cassidy are arguing, Burgess gets shot while investigating a house call.
25	10	"Shouldn't Have Been Alone"	Fred Berner	Michael Weiss	January 7, 2015	210	7.41
The Intelligence Unit investigates a house with rigged traps and learn of a connection to a professor's sphere and a mentally ill student of his. They investigate several places rigged with traps and learn of a darker motive of the student. Elsewhere, Burgess recovers with Platt and Ruzek at her side.
26	11	"We Don't Work Together Anymore"	Mario Van Peebles	Michael Bastick & Mo Masi	January 14, 2015	211	6.77
Burgess is released from the hospital and assigned to desk duty to take it easy, so Platt partners up with Roman. The Intelligence unit teams up with Lindsay's task force on a kidnapping case. Also, Lindsay starts to have doubts about keeping her new job.
27	12	"Disco Bob"	Holly Dale	Maisha Closson & Cole Maliska	January 21, 2015	212	7.00
The Intelligence unit investigates a double murder that affects part of a past for Voight while Halstead continues to develop feelings for Lindsay and Burgess has her first day back at work.
28	13	"A Little Devil Complex"	Steve Shill	Michael Brandt & Derek Haas	February 4, 2015	213	7.58
The Intelligence Unit investigates Adrian Gish, the arsonist indirectly responsible for killing CFD paramedic and Antonio's sister Gabriela Dawson's friend, Leslie Shay. During the investigation they discover he has been using various aliases that allude to those he killed, including the names of the real Adrian Gish and of a firefighter who was killed in the same incident as Peter Mills' father. They eventually find his real name, Trenton Lamont, and as a boy he was the only survivor of a fire that killed his entire family when he was 7 years old. After a failed stakeout, they search Lamont's home in which they find numerous photos of Gaby and realize he's now targeting her. Lamont lures her into a building where he traps her in an elevator and pours gasoline inside, intending to burn her and himself alive. Gaby is able to stall Lamont long enough for Antonio to rescue her and shoot him dead. Meanwhile at the precinct, Sergeant Platt acts exceedingly nice to all the officers prompting Burgess and Roman to become suspicious. When confronted about it, she tells them she is being investigated by the city after a complaint said she lacked people skills. When it's later revealed that it was a front for a reporter doing a story on her, the lie angers Burgess and she walks away. This episode concludes a crossover with Chicago Fire that begins on "Three Bells". It is included on the Chicago Fire Season 3 DVD set. Guest stars: Monica Raymund as Gabriela Dawson; Charlie Barnett as Peter Mills; Eamonn Walker as Wallace Boden; Robert Knepper as Adrian Gish/Trenton Lamont
29	14	"Erin's Mom"	Mark Tinker	Craig Gore & Tim Walsh	February 11, 2015	214	6.58
The Intelligence Unit investigates a homicide, but it is revealed that this case has something to do with Lindsay's mother and her husband. Later, Voight and the unit catch the suspect and put him custody. Soon after, the suspect kills an inmate and escapes and has an effect on Trudy. Lindsay questions her mother on this case. Later on, it is revealed that Lindsay's mother is trying to get back on her feet by borrowing money from a loan shark so Voight helps her out with the provision that she not see Lindsay again. After this, Lindsay calls Voight to thank him for what he did. Elsewhere, Dawson strikes up a new relationship post divorce.
30	15	"What Do You Do"	Nick Gomez	Michael Brandt & Derek Haas	February 18, 2015	215	7.08
While on patrol, Burgess and Roman come across a smuggling ring, but are later caught and held hostage. Meanwhile, on a slow day in the Intelligence Unit, they finally get their taser certification. With no communication on the outside, Burgess and Roman almost escape. The smuggler manages to catch Roman, but Burgess attacks and kills their kidnapper. As more smugglers arrive, the Intelligence Unit finally track down their whereabouts and rescue Burgess and Roman.
31	16	"What Puts You On That Ledge"	Fred Berner	Eduardo Javier Canto & Ryan Maldonado	February 25, 2015	216	7.43
Chicago Internal Affairs enlists Dawson to go deep undercover to bust criminals that might have something to do with the disappearance of a Chicago Police officer. Later on, Dawson discovers that one of his old friends is a part of it. Meanwhile, Roman and Burgess answer a fake burglary report that later turns into a homicide case. Jay gets an old friend a job as the IT guy.
32	17	"Say Her Real Name"	Nick Gomez	Story by : Dick Wolf & Matt Olmstead; Teleplay by : Craig Gore & Tim Walsh	March 25, 2015	217	6.34
The death of a protester at a world trade event seems to point to an Argentine official. In other events, Halstead's brother arrives in town; and is soon stirring up trouble.
33	18	"Get Back to Even"	Jann Turner	Michael Weiss	April 1, 2015	218	6.59
The investigation into a drug robbery gone wrong uncovers Voight's link to a missing teen; the real reason for Halstead's brother's visit becomes clear; and Platt cares for a young girl at the district.
34	19	"The Three Gs"	Sanford Bookstaver	Craig Gore & Tim Walsh	April 8, 2015	219	6.73
The deaths of several teen girls in a Chinatown factory leads to a search for a human trafficker who eluded Olinsky once before. In other events, Sean has an altercation with a fellow officer; and Platt helps Nadia prepare for a polygraph test.
35	20	"The Number of Rats"	Nick Gomez	Story by : Matt Olmstead & Warren Leight; Teleplay by : Matt Olmstead & Cole Maliska	April 29, 2015	220	8.07
Benson has come to Chicago to help Voight and Intelligence with a rape/murder case that is frighteningly similar to a case from New York a decade ago. She calls in Fin and Amaro to assist. This episode continues a crossover with Chicago Fire and Law & Order: Special Victims Unit that begins on "We Called Her Jellybean" and concludes on "Daydream Believer". It is included on the Chicago Fire Season 3 and Law & Order: Special Victims Unit Season 16 DVD sets.
36	21	"There's My Girl"	Mark Tinker	Michael Batstick & Mo Masi	May 6, 2015	221	6.54
The investigation into the bombing of a trendy café hinges on a minor, who witnessed it; and a major blunder lands Atwater in hot water. In other events, Voight helps Platt in her attempt to get a memorial stone for the team's fallen member Nadia.
37	22	"Push the Pain Away"	Sanford Bookstaver	Story by : Eduardo Javier Canto & Ryan Maldonado; Teleplay by : Michael Weiss	May 13, 2015	222	6.94
A mass shooting at an athletic club is investigated; and Atwater, who's dealing with his new assignment, helps locate the suspected shooters. Platt and Halstead, meanwhile, check in with Lindsay to see how she's managing. Later, a madman takes hostages in a downtown building, and Voight is sent in, alone, to try and negotiate with him.
38	23	"Born Into Bad News"	Mark Tinker	Craig Gore & Tim Walsh	May 20, 2015	223	7.21
Commander Perry asks Voight and the team to rescue his cop-nephew from a corrupt squad of officers that robs drug dealers but the case becomes personal for the Intelligence unit and the Chicago PD when Commander Perry is murdered. Lindsay keeps drinking alcohol and taking drugs and slowly starts spiralling out of control, resulting in her turning in her badge to quit. In other events, a woman from Olinsky's past contacts him.

== Production ==
=== Changes ===
Archie Kao's character Detective Sheldon Jin was killed in the first season's finale, thus his character will not be appearing in the second season of the show. However, showrunner Matt Olmstead revealed that "It [Jin's death] shakes everybody up...definitely for the next three or four episodes until people can re-galvanize as a family, but people have some hard feelings about how it all goes down."

Officer Kim Burgess would be joined by a new partner, whom Olmstead describes as being an important voice to the team in the second season and particularly for Burgess. Brian Geraghty was later announced to be portraying Sean Roman, the new partner of Kim Burgess (Marina Squerciati).

Jesse Lee Soffer revealed that there will be a lot more crossovers this season between Chicago P.D. and parent show Chicago Fire; "I think every episode from now on, they're going to have a couple characters from one show on the other" he told media sources.

=== Crossovers ===
On September 29, 2014, it was announced that Wolf's series: Chicago P.D., Chicago Fire and Law & Order: Special Victims Unit, would be involved in a three part crossover event airing between November 11 and November 12, 2014 starting with Chicago Fire and ending with Law & Order: Special Victims Unit and Chicago P.D..

Another crossover event aired on February 3 and February 4, 2015 starting with Chicago Fire and concluding with Chicago P.D..

A further crossover event aired on April 28 and April 29, 2015 starting with Chicago Fire, continuing with Chicago P.D. and concluding with Law & Order: Special Victims Unit.

== Ratings ==
Viewership and ratings per episode of Chicago P.D. season 2
No.	Title	Air date	Rating/share (18–49)	Viewers (millions)	DVR (18–49)	DVR viewers (millions)	Total (18–49)	Total viewers (millions)
1	"Call It Macaroni"	September 24, 2014	1.9/6	8.51	1.2	3.42	3.1	11.98
2	"Get My Cigarettes"	October 1, 2014	1.5/5	6.63	1.1	3.38	2.6	10.06
3	"The Weigh Station"	October 8, 2014	1.5/5	6.63	1.1	3.18	2.6	9.85
4	"Chicken, Dynamite, Chainsaw"	October 15, 2014	1.6/5	6.78	1.0	2.98	2.6	9.76
5	"An Honest Woman"	October 22, 2014	1.5/5	6.85	0.9	2.92	2.4	9.76
6	"Prison Ball"	November 5, 2014	1.4/4	6.15	1.1	3.53	2.5	9.68
7	"They'll Have to Go Through Me"	November 12, 2014	2.2/7	9.54	1.5	4.02	3.7	13.56
8	"Assignment of the Year"	November 19, 2014	1.6/5	7.29	1.1	3.16	2.7	10.44
9	"Called In Dead"	December 10, 2014	1.5/5	6.71	1.0	3.29	2.5	10.00
10	"Shouldn't Have Been Alone"	January 7, 2015	1.6/5	7.41	1.1	3.16	2.7	10.62
11	"We Don't Work Together Anymore"	January 14, 2015	1.5/5	6.77	1.1	3.10	2.6	9.87
12	"Disco Bob"	January 21, 2015	1.5/5	7.00	1.2	3.54	2.7	10.54
13	"A Little Devil Complex"	February 4, 2015	1.6/5	7.58	1.2	3.47	2.8	11.05
14	"Erin's Mom"	February 11, 2015	1.4/4	6.58	1.1	3.31	2.5	9.89
15	"What Do You Do"	February 18, 2015	1.7/5	7.08	0.9	3.18	2.6	10.26
16	"What Puts You on that Ledge"	February 25, 2015	1.5/5	7.43	1.1	3.26	2.6	10.68
17	"Say Her Real Name"	March 25, 2015	1.5/5	6.34	1.0	3.14	2.5	9.43
18	"Get Back to Even"	April 1, 2015	1.6/5	6.59	1.0	3.10	2.6	10.05
19	"The Three Gs"	April 8, 2015	1.5/5	6.73	1.0	3.23	2.5	9.92
20	"The Number of Rats"	April 29, 2015	1.8/6	8.07	1.0	3.11	2.8	11.05
21	"There's My Girl"	May 6, 2015	1.4/5	6.54	1.0	3.00	2.4	9.56
22	"Push the Pain Away"	May 13, 2015	1.6/5	6.94	1.0	3.26	2.6	10.19
23	"Born Into Bad News"	May 20, 2015	1.4/5	7.21	1.1	3.31	2.5	10.53

== Home media ==
The DVD release of season two was released in Region 1 on September 1, 2015

The Complete Second Season
Set details			Special features
23 episodes; 1186 minutes(Region 1); 6-disc set; 1.78:1 aspect ratio; Languages: English (Dolby Digital 2.0 Surround); Subtitles: English (Region 1)			Behind the Scenes; Chicago Fire Season 3 Crossover Episodes; "Nobody Touches Anything"; "Three Bells"; "We Called Her Jellybean"; Law & Order: SVU Season 16 Crossover Episodes; "Chicago Crossover"; "Daydream Believer"
Release dates			Behind the Scenes; Chicago Fire Season 3 Crossover Episodes; "Nobody Touches Anything"; "Three Bells"; "We Called Her Jellybean"; Law & Order: SVU Season 16 Crossover Episodes; "Chicago Crossover"; "Daydream Believer"
United States	United Kingdom	Australia	Behind the Scenes; Chicago Fire Season 3 Crossover Episodes; "Nobody Touches Anything"; "Three Bells"; "We Called Her Jellybean"; Law & Order: SVU Season 16 Crossover Episodes; "Chicago Crossover"; "Daydream Believer"
September 1, 2015	October 26, 2015	December 3, 2015	Behind the Scenes; Chicago Fire Season 3 Crossover Episodes; "Nobody Touches Anything"; "Three Bells"; "We Called Her Jellybean"; Law & Order: SVU Season 16 Crossover Episodes; "Chicago Crossover"; "Daydream Believer"
