= Law & Order: Special Victims Unit season 16 =

Season of American television series

Law & Order: Special Victims Unit
- Season 16
- Season 16 U.S. DVD cover
- Starring: Mariska Hargitay; Danny Pino; Kelli Giddish; Ice-T; Raúl Esparza; Peter Scanavino
- No. of episodes: 23

Release
- Original network: NBC
- Original release: September 24, 2014 – May 20, 2015

Season chronology
- ← Previous; Season 15 Next → Season 17

The sixteenth season of Law & Order: Special Victims Unit debuted on Wednesday, September 24, 2014, at 9pm/8c (Eastern), and concluded on Wednesday, May 20, 2015, on NBC.

== Production ==
Law & Order: Special Victims Unit was renewed for a sixteenth season on May 7, 2014, by NBC. and premiered on September 24, 2014. Production on the season commenced on May 22, with the shooting of first episode, entitled "Girls Disappeared", completed in early June. A second episode was also completed during June with the third scheduled episode being pushed back until after the production hiatus to give rest to the cast and crew.

Executive producer Warren Leight revealed that the sixteenth season would follow the events of the previous season finale, with Detective Nick Amaro (Danny Pino) "sent to the bowels of Queens to do traffic stops". Prior to the conclusion of the fifteenth season and hence Sergeant Olivia Benson's (Mariska Hargitay) fostering of baby Noah Porter, Raúl Esparza (Rafael Barba) revealed that, "Benson has a very big, life-changing event take place for her, which I think is gonna last for a while...she might make some choices that are really gonna change her life."

NBC President Robert Greenblatt announced that Chicago PD, Chicago Fire, and also Law & Order: Special Victims Unit, could continue to have crossover episodes during the 2014–15 season. The episode entitled "Chicago Crossover" aired on November 12, 2014, as part of a crossover between Chicago P.D., Chicago Fire, and SVU. Additionally, the episode entitled "Daydream Believer", served as the second crossover with the three aforementioned shows.

== Cast ==
=== Main ===
- Mariska Hargitay as Sergeant Olivia Benson
- Danny Pino as Police Officer/Junior/Senior Detective Nick Amaro
- Kelli Giddish as Junior Detective Amanda Rollins
- Ice-T as Senior Detective Odafin "Fin" Tutuola
- Raúl Esparza as Assistant District Attorney Rafael Barba
- Peter Scanavino as Junior Detective Dominick "Sonny" Carisi, Jr. (episodes 5–23, recurring episodes 1–3)

=== Special guest stars ===
- Dann Florek as Donald "Don" Cragen
- Tamara Tunie as Medical Examiner Dr. Melinda Warner

=== Crossover stars from Chicago P.D. ===
- Jason Beghe as Chicago Police Department Sergeant Hank Voight
- Sophia Bush as Chicago Police Department Detective Erin Lindsay
- Brian Geraghty as Chicago Police Department Officer Sean Roman
- Stella Maeve as Nadia Decotis
- Jesse Lee Soffer as Chicago Police Department Detective Jay Halstead
- Marina Squerciati as Chicago Police Department Officer Kim Burgess

=== Recurring ===
- Ami Brabson as Judge Karyn Blake
- Stephen C. Bradbury as Judge Colin McNamara
- Robert John Burke as Internal Affairs Bureau Lieutenant Ed Tucker
- Vincent Curatola as Judge Al Burtuccio
- Dashiell Eaves as Sergeant Kevin Donlan
- Peter Gallagher as Deputy Chief William Dodds
- Charles Halford as Johnny "D" Drake
- Harry Hamlin as Atlanta Police Department Deputy Chief Charles Patton
- Peter Hermann as Defense Attorney Trevor Langan
- Tabitha Holbert as Assistant District Attorney Rose Callier
- Nikki M. James as Detective Gail Dunbar
- Christine Toy Johnson as Dr. Celia Lee
- Yvonna Kopacz-Wright as Dr. Darby Wilder
- Michael Kostroff as Defense Attorney Evan Braun
- Hoda Kotb as herself
- Donal Logue as Lieutenant Declan Murphy
- Sonia Manzano as Judge Gloria Pepitone
- Elizabeth Marvel as Defense Attorney Rita Calhoun
- Michael Mastro as Judge Serani
- Jefferson Mays as Medical Examiner Dr. Carl Rudnick
- Leslie Odom Jr. as Reverend Curtis Scott
- Jessica Phillips as Assistant District Attorney Pippa Cox
- Thedra Porter as Chantal Jackson
- Bronwyn Reed as Lucy Huston
- Steve Rosen as Defence Attorney Michael Guthrie
- Jenna Stern as Judge Elana Barth
- Lili Taylor as Martha Thornhill
- Aida Turturro as Judge Felicia Catano
- Jamila Velazquez as Pilar Morenas
- Caris Vujcec as Detective Louise Campesi
- Myk Watford as Atlanta Police Department Captain Sam Reynolds
- Delaney Williams as Defense Attorney John Buchanan
- Danika Yarosh as Ariel Thornhill

=== Guest stars ===
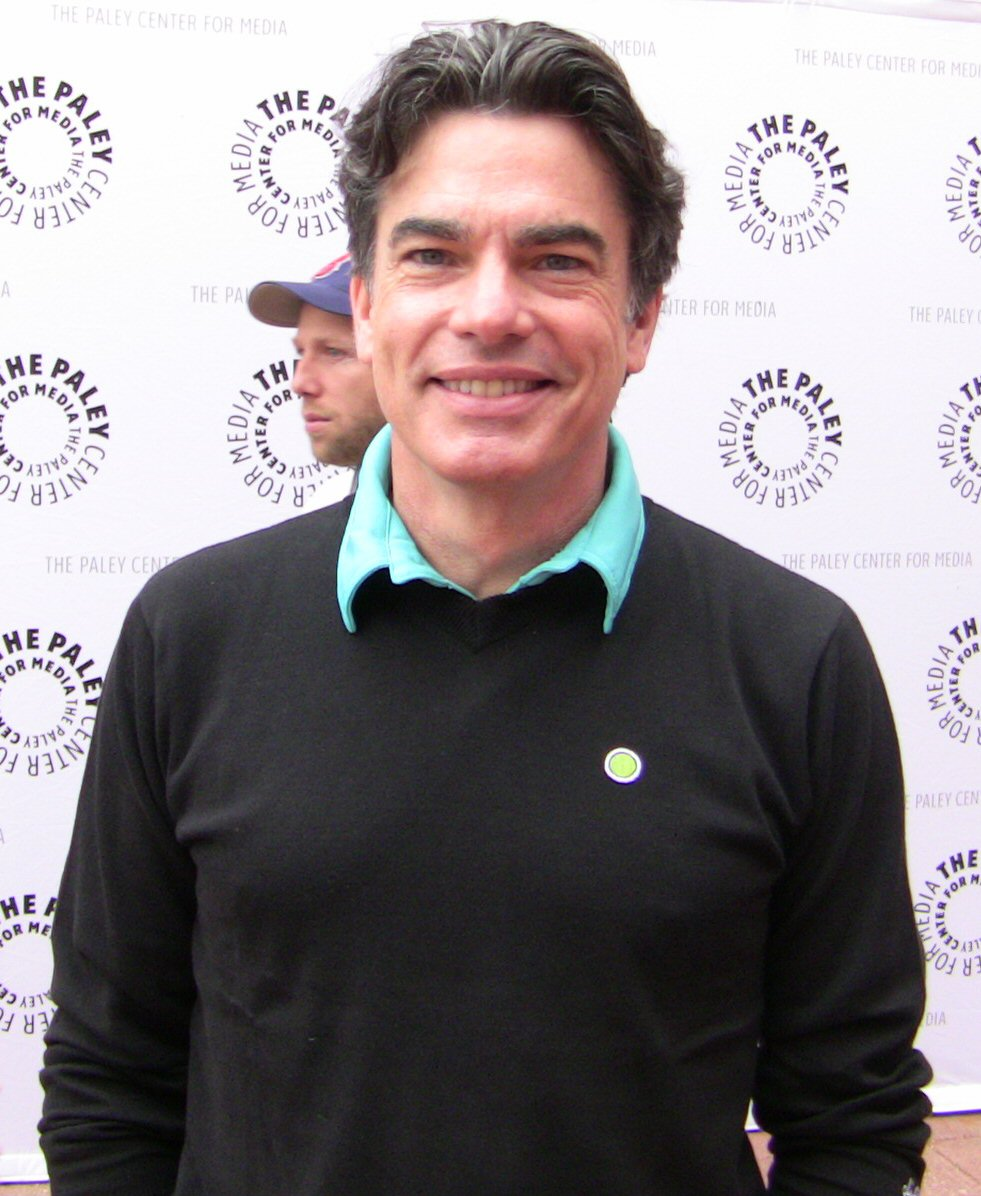
Peter Gallagher portrays Deputy Chief William Dodds, the head of all the Special Victims Units in New York City, in 4 episodes.

Peter Scanavino joined, originally in a recurring capacity, as Detective Dominick "Sonny" Carisi Jr., beginning with the season premiere episode "Girls Disappeared". Detective Carisi is "going to come in [to SVU] and shake things up...a guy who maybe needs a little bit of refining". Starting with the fifth episode of the season, Scanavino was upgraded to a regular cast member. Scanavino previously appeared in the season fourteen episode "Monster's Legacy" as another character.

Peter Gallagher joins this season, in a recurring capacity, as Deputy Chief William Dodds, the head of all the Special Victims Units in New York City.

Teri Polo of the ABC Family series The Fosters guest stars in the second episode, "American Disgrace", as Cordelia. Polo previously appeared in the season ten episode "Confession" as another character. Stacy Keach, Henry Simmons and Sandy Duncan also guest star.

Ron Rifkin returns to SVU portraying defense attorney Marvin Exley in an episode that aired in October, "Producer’s Backend". Exley represents Tensley (portrayed by Stevie Lynn Jones), a young Hollywood celebrity in conflict with the law. Brian d'Arcy James stars as the top-level producer who gave Tensley a score. Dana Wheeler-Nicholson also guest stars as Tensley's mother.

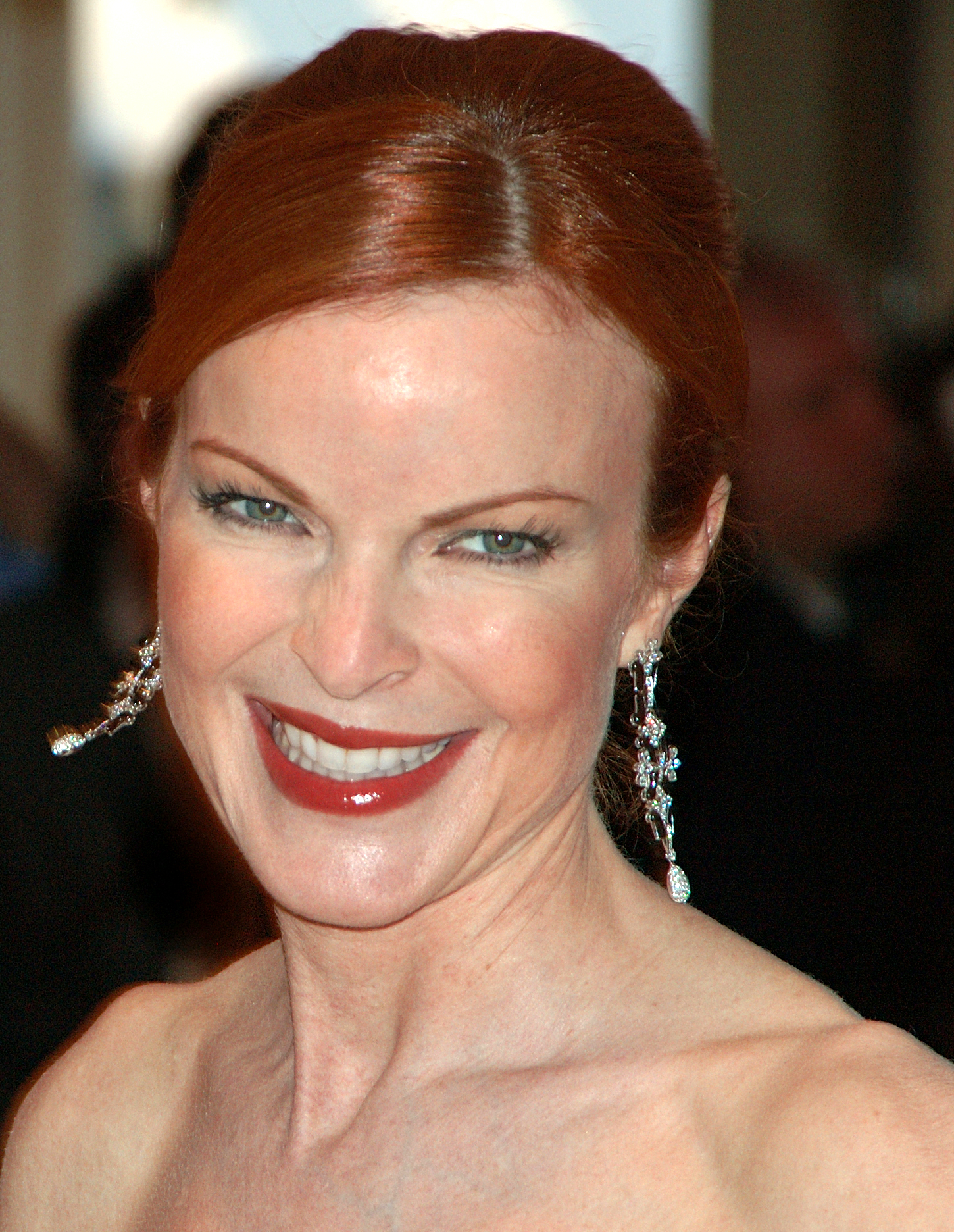
Marcia Cross portrays a woman accused of raping her husband, in "December Solstice".

Chicago P.D.'s Sophia Bush (Det. Erin Lindsay), Jesse Lee Soffer (Det. Jay Halstead), and Jason Beghe (Sgt. Hank Voight) take part in a crossover event between Chicago Fire, Chicago P.D. and SVU in the November episode "Chicago Crossover". Specifically, they are involved in a joint case involving child sex internet ring. Additionally, Bush and Soffer, with Marina Squerciati (Ofc. Burgess), Brian Geraghty (Ofc. Roman) and Stella Maeve (Nadia Decotis), also took part in the second crossover event between the three shows ("Daydream Believer"). In this episode, SVU works with Chicago Intelligence on a rape/murder case connected to an apartment fire in the Chicago Fire episode "We Called Her Jellybean" and pursue the suspect they're forced to let go in the Chicago P.D. episode "The Number of Rats".

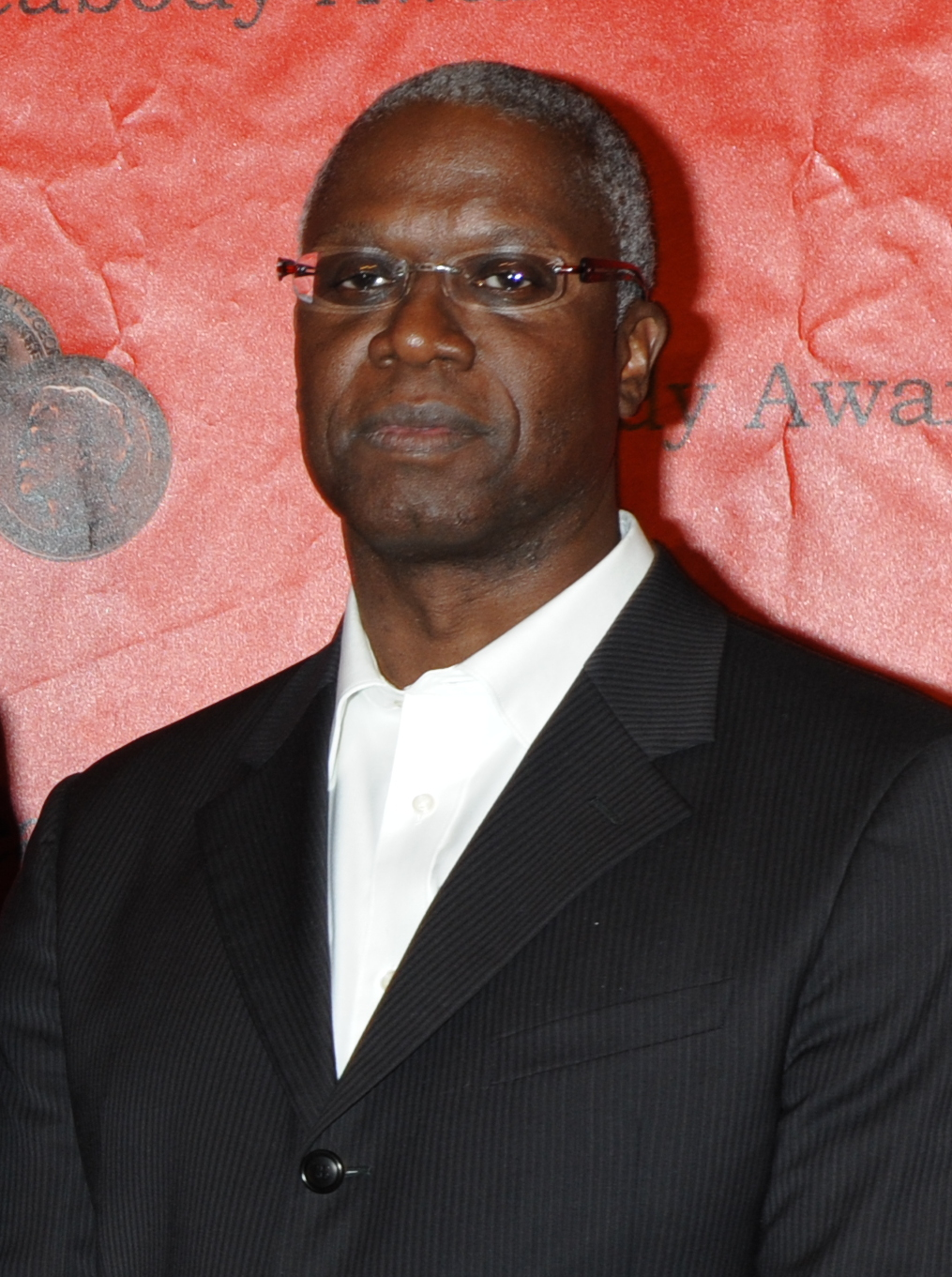
Andre Braugher returned to SVU in "Perverted Justice" as his character Bayard Ellis. He previously appeared in multiple episodes in seasons 13 and 14.

Harry Hamlin guest starred in an episode that aired on December 10, "Pattern Seventeen" as Rollins' previous commanding-officer in Atlanta, Deputy Chief Patton. Peter Hermann also guest starred in this episode as defense attorney Trevor Langan. Hamlin made a further appearance in the January 7 episode "Forgiving Rollins", alongside Don't Trust the B— in Apartment 23 actress Dreama Walker. Walker portrays Reese Taymor, a detective from Atlanta who attends a law enforcement conference in New York, with Patton and accuses the latter of rape.

"Agent Provocateur" features guest appearances from Tony Award winner Patti LuPone alongside of former Smash star and Tony nominee Jeremy Jordan. LuPone plays a Hollywood agent and Jordan her newest star who both become involved when their actor colleague is accused of rape. Jordan previously appeared in the 2008 episode "Streetwise", while LuPone made appearances on the original Law & Order series.

Armand Assante guest starred in "Padre Sandunguero" as Nicholas, Detective Amaro's father. The episode also featured the second appearance of Tony winner Nikki M. James as a detective. James previously appeared as a 911 Operator in the 2012 episode "Father Dearest".

Tamara Tunie returned after a long absence as Dr. Melinda Warner in the February 18 episode "Undercover Mother", alongside Donal Logue as lieutenant Declan Murphy after his five-episode arc last season. Tunie later appeared in "Daydream Believer".

In "December Solstice", Marcia Cross portrays Charmaine Briggs, the sixth wife of celebrity author Walter Briggs (played by Robert Vaughn), who is accused of sexually abusing her husband, by their step-daughters. This episode marks Cross' first television appearance since the 2012 finale of Desperate Housewives, of which she was part of the cast from 2004 to 2012. The episode marks Vaughn's final television prior to his death on November 11, 2016.

Andre Braugher returned to SVU as his season 13–14 recurring character defense attorney Bayard Ellis in the episode entitled "Perverted Justice". Ellis tried to set a jailed father accused of raping his daughter, free, after she recants her testimony against him. House's Robert Sean Leonard guest stars as ADA Kenneth O'Dwyer, who goes head-to-head with Ellis in court over the case. Alongside Braugher and Leonard, Dann Florek made a guest appearance in the same episode as Don Cragen. Cragen, previously a main character, who served as Captain of SVU from 1999 until the fifteenth season, assists Benson in re-opening the case and gathering evidence.

== Episodes ==
Law & Order: Special Victims Unit season 16 episodes
No. overall	No. in season	Title	Directed by	Written by	Original release date	Prod. code	U.S. viewers (millions)
344	1	"Girls Disappeared"	Alex Chapple	Story by : Warren Leight & Julie Martin; Teleplay by : Robert Brooks Cohen & Kevin Fox	September 24, 2014	1601	10.07
Detective Amaro, now working as a beat cop in Queens, arrests an underage prostitute who reveals she was a witness to the murder of Ellie Porter, the mother of Sergeant Benson's foster son Noah. Benson asks Amaro to go undercover, which sets off a series of events that puts everyone involved in danger – including baby Noah. Meanwhile, Benson meets the new addition to the squad, Detective Carisi (Peter Scanavino), who starts off on the wrong foot.
345	2	"American Disgrace"	Arthur W. Forney	Warren Leight & Julie Martin	October 1, 2014	1602	7.73
Orion Bay clothing line press rep Carla Cannon (Kelley Missal) tells reporters she was raped by basketball superstar Shakir "The Shark" Wilkins (Henry Simmons). However, the authenticity of her story and the stories of other women is questioned by Carisi and leaves ADA Barba with a shaky case. As the trial begins, the case starts to fall apart and more than just family secrets of Orion Bay's billionaire owner Orion Bauer (Stacy Keach) and his daughter (Teri Polo) are revealed.
346	3	"Producer's Backend"	Michael Pressman	Story by : Julie Martin & Warren Leight; Teleplay by : Jill Abbinanti & Brianna Yellen	October 8, 2014	1603	7.55
Amaro reports to the scene of a car crash where Hollywood starlet Tensley Evans (Stevie Lynn Jones) tries to flirt her way out of trouble. Amaro's by-the-book handling allows for him to be transferred back to the SVU team, just in time to investigate Evans for the statutory rape of a 15-year-old boy. As Barba pushes forward with her trial for rape, Benson begins to suspect underlying issues that led to Evans' actions, which leads the squad to a producer (Brian d'Arcy James) who has a troubling history.: Cameo appearance by Hoda Kotb as TV anchor; Former child star Josh Saviano, now a real-life New York Bar-licensed attorney, appears as defense attorney Don Taft.
347	4	"Holden's Manifesto"	Jean de Segonzac	Story by : Kevin Fox; Teleplay by : Julie Martin & Warren Leight	October 15, 2014	1604	7.16
Holden March (John Karna), a lovelorn, socially awkward young man, begins to exact revenge on the women he believes have wronged him, which soon escalates to murder. When Detectives Amaro and Rollins find Holden with hostages at a local school, they soon find out how dangerous a desperate man can be. Meanwhile, Benson deals with pressure from the newly appointed Deputy Chief William Dodds (Peter Gallagher) while Noah is hospitalized.
348	5	"Pornstar's Requiem"	Jennifer Getzinger	Story by : Kevin Fox & Warren Leight; Teleplay by : Robert Brooks Cohen & Céline C. Robinson	October 22, 2014	1605	7.19
Evie Barnes (Hannah Marks) answers a modeling ad hoping to make money for college tuition, but it quickly turns into pornography. When college students discover her double life, they force themselves on Evie at a party, resulting in their arrest for rape. Although she is not the one on trial, Benson and Barba fight to prove her innocence in the courtroom.
349	6	"Glasgowman's Wrath"	Jean de Segonzac	Story by : Julie Martin & Warren Leight; Teleplay by : Brianna Yellen & Jill Abbinanti	November 5, 2014	1606	7.00
When a babysitter's ghost stories lead to two girls going missing and another severely injured, Benson and the SVU detectives work to locate a suspect and decipher fact from fiction.
350	7	"Chicago Crossover"	Steve Shill	Story by : Dick Wolf & Warren Leight; Teleplay by : Ed Zuckerman	November 12, 2014	1607	10.01
Benson and SVU get a new lead on a missing child pornography victim from Sergeant Hank Voight (Jason Beghe) of the Chicago Police Department. When things become personal for CPD Detective Erin Lindsay (Sophia Bush), she and her partner, Jay Halstead (Jesse Lee Soffer), travel to New York to lend a hand in the investigation. This episode continues a crossover with Chicago Fire and Chicago P.D. that begins on "Nobody Touches Anything" and concludes on "They'll Have to Go Through Me". It is included on the Chicago Fire Season 3 and Chicago P.D. Season 2 DVD sets.
351	8	"Spousal Privilege"	Sharat Raju	Story by : Warren Leight & Julie Martin; Teleplay by : Julie Martin & Samantha Corbin-Miller	November 19, 2014	1608	7.93
Detective Tutuola discovers security camera footage of a domestic dispute between a famous sportscaster (Chad Coleman) and his girlfriend (Meagan Good). While Fin and Benson dive into the couple's life, Barba tries to convince the woman to press charges.: Cameo appearance by Hoda Kotb as TV anchor
352	9	"Pattern Seventeen"	Martha Mitchell	Kevin Fox	December 10, 2014	1609	6.90
When a series of young girls are assaulted, Rollins connects the pattern to cases she worked in Atlanta, but discovers that none of the rape kits were tested. Returning to Atlanta to interview a victim believed to have been assaulted by their suspect, she has an awkward reunion with her former boss, Atlanta Deputy Chief Charles Patton (Harry Hamlin). While the detectives connect the pattern to other cities with untested rape kits, Benson faces scrutiny at CompStat from Deputy Chief Dodds and the NYPD brass.
353	10	"Forgiving Rollins"	Michael Slovis	Julie Martin & Warren Leight	January 7, 2015	1610	7.76
Atlanta Deputy Chief Patton and his new detective, Reese Taymor (Dreama Walker), visit New York for a sex crimes conference. After the conference, Taymor reports being raped in her hotel, leading Benson and SVU to question her fellow visiting Atlanta police officers. When Rollins discovers a personal connection to Taymor, Barba seeks Rollins' help in court, which forces her to disclose a secret she has worked hard to hide.
354	11	"Agent Provocateur"	Alex Chapple	Samantha Corbin-Miller	January 14, 2015	1611	6.68
A young woman (Madison Grace) sneaks out to attend a party with her celebrity crush, Scott Russo. Things take a turn for the worse when the teenager is found sexually assaulted and left for dead in an alley. Russo and his manager (Patti LuPone) are then suspects when security footage of the party goes missing, only to turn up on a gossip website. When the website's CEO refuses to hand over the footage to the squad, Barba fights to get the truth by having the man arrested for withholding evidence.
355	12	"Padre Sandunguero"	Mariska Hargitay	Story by : Peter Blauner & Warren Leight; Teleplay by : Peter Blauner	January 21, 2015	1612	6.77
Amaro's father, Nicolas (Armand Assante), invites his estranged family to his wedding with a 28-year-old woman. When Amaro declines the invitation, a fight ignites at the wedding, causing Nicolas to become arrested for assault. Amaro and the SVU squad become entangled in the investigation, with IAB keeping an eye on Amaro's involvement. Barba takes the case and requires Amaro to stand as a witness, which forces him to reveal family secrets and face the possibility of tearing his family apart.
356	13	"Decaying Morality"	Michael Pressman	Kevin Fox & Brianna Yellen	February 4, 2015	1613	6.20
Benson and Rollins treat a rape victim (Haley Lu Richardson) found with her clothes torn, who claims to have been raped in a pizzeria bathroom. With a criminal record and a pending lawsuit against the NYPD, the precinct is short on evidence and the suspect is released. Enraged, Jenna's father (Jamie McShane) conducts his own investigation, which could change the family's lives and make SVU's job harder.
357	14	"Intimidation Game"	Jean de Segonzac	Story by : Julie Martin, Céline C. Robinson, & Robert Brooks Cohen; Teleplay by : Céline C. Robinson & Robert Brooks Cohen	February 11, 2015	1614	6.12
Video game developer Raina Punjabi (Mouzam Makkar) ignores warnings from online predators as the release date of her game arrives. When a female employee is soon assaulted at a game convention, the detectives ask Punjabi to halt the game's release. When she refuses, Fin and SVU must race to protect her from technically skilled predators that want to see Punjabi out of the gaming business.
358	15	"Undercover Mother"	Steve Shill	Warren Leight & Julie Martin	February 18, 2015	1615	6.45
While undercover to destroy a sex trafficking ring, Carisi encounters Martha Thornhill (Lili Taylor). She explains she has been disguising herself as a madame in the organization in order to try to find and save her daughter, Ariel, who had been kidnapped. She eventually gives up working alone and asks SVU to help her. As a team, they try to break down the pimp and his cohorts, while Ariel remains missing, and discover they may have some help on the inside from an old friend. Meanwhile, Dr. Warner discovers that the pimp is Noah's biological father and alerts Benson.
359	16	"December Solstice"	Sharat Raju	Ed Zuckerman	February 25, 2015	1616	7.72
Walter Briggs (Robert Vaughn), a celebrity author, is put in the middle of a feud between his sixth wife, Charmaine (Marcia Cross), and his daughters over his welfare, sparked by an accusation that Charmaine has been sexually abusing her husband by giving him erectile dysfunctional medication without his knowledge. When Walter is hospitalized for a heart attack, Charmaine removes him from the hospital against medical advice before any tests can be conducted. A subsequent heart attack causes Walter's death, prompting Barba to pursue manslaughter charges against Charmaine. During the trial, a video tape that Walter recorded prior to his dementia is released, revealing his feelings and wishes for his family. Meanwhile, Barba struggles with his decision to put his grandmother in a retirement home.
360	17	"Parole Violations"	Jean de Segonzac	Jill Abbinanti	March 25, 2015	1617	5.92
Carisi's sister Bella is preparing for the birth of her child with her fiancé, Tommy, but events take a turn for the worse when Tommy returns to old habits and accuses his parole officer, Donna Marshall, of rape. With the help of Benson and the detectives, Carisi investigates Tommy's allegation, but Barba faces an uphill battle convincing a jury that a woman can rape a man.
361	18	"Devastating Story"	Michael Slovis	Samantha Corbin-Miller	April 1, 2015	1618	6.25
Skip Peterson (Rob Morrow), a television host, broadcasts an interview with Heather Manning, a college student, who claims to have been gang raped in a fraternity house. Manning's story goes viral and the case quickly turns into a she-said, they-said dilemma, with pressure on SVU to open a real investigation. The lack of a rape kit, the shakiness of the victim and varying numbers of suspects result in the case being dismissed.
362	19	"Granting Immunity"	Holly Dale	Story by : Julie Martin & Warren Leight; Teleplay by : Brianna Yellen & A. Zell Williams	April 8, 2015	1619	7.31
Savannah Biel's (Hayden Tweedie) pornographic photos quickly go viral in Tribeca High School after an underage sex party. A measles outbreak stops Barba's attempts to arrest the suspects and Benson is hit with reality when Noah contracts the illness. While dealing with Noah's situation, Benson investigates the group of mothers who have lied about their children's medical records. Meanwhile, Amaro learns some worrisome news about his son.
363	20	"Daydream Believer"	Martha Mitchell	Story by : Warren Leight & Matt Olmstead; Teleplay by : Julie Martin & Ed Zuckerman	April 29, 2015	1620	9.28
Benson and CPD Sgt. Voight lead their teams in the investigation of a rape-murder case that is frighteningly similar to a case from New York a decade ago. While searching for the suspect, one of Chicago's own is kidnapped, intensifying SVU's mission to help Voight's team locate the man. This episode concludes a crossover with Chicago Fire and Chicago P.D. that begins on "We Called Her Jellybean" and continues on "The Number of Rats". It is included on the Chicago Fire Season 3 and Chicago P.D. Season 2 DVD sets.
364	21	"Perverted Justice"	Alex Chapple	Story by : Warren Leight & Julie Martin; Teleplay by : Robert Brooks Cohen & Céline C. Robinson	May 6, 2015	1621	6.11
Bayard Ellis (Andre Braugher) asks the SVU squad to reopen the investigation of a man (Glenn Plummer) who was convicted of incest and rape when the man's daughter (Samira Wiley), a recovering addict, recants her original testimony, claiming it was all a lie that her mother forced her to say in court. When the original motion to vacate the charges is denied, the squad turns to retired Captain Cragen (Dann Florek) for insight in the case and uncover evidence that was never presented during the original trial.
365	22	"Parents' Nightmare"	Jean de Segonzac	Kevin Fox & Brendan Feeney	May 13, 2015	1622	6.82
Owen Farhidi, an 8-year-old boy, is kidnapped at school. After receiving a ransom request, Owen's mother, Dana, contacts SVU for help. Amaro works with the mother and her ex-husband, Sam, when footage proves the victim knew his abductor. The strain between the estranged couple threatens the investigation until Benson and Amaro convince one spouse to turn against the other. Meanwhile, pressure from One Police Plaza for a higher-ranking commanding officer at SVU leads Benson to consider taking the Lieutenant's exam.: Based on a Lincoln County, Missouri family's staged kidnapping of their son to educate him about "stranger danger".
366	23	"Surrendering Noah"	Michael Slovis	Julie Martin & Warren Leight	May 20, 2015	1623	6.96
After expressing interest in taking the upcoming Sergeant's exam, Amaro learns from Benson that One Police Plaza does not want to promote him as he is considered "damaged goods" due to his involvement in several past incidents. As Johnny D's (Charles Halford) criminal case finally goes to trial, Benson goes against Barba's advice by disclosing that Johnny is the biological father of Noah, endangering the final stages of the adoption. A disruption during the trial grants Johnny the opportunity to grab an officer's gun; he kills one court officer and wounds Amaro, the judge, and another officer, but Amaro returns fire and kills him. Realizing that he is unlikely to advance within the NYPD and that the department may use his injuries to force him into early retirement, Amaro resigns in order to move to California so he can be closer to his children.: Based on the story of Arron Kimbrell, The Fulton County courthouse shooting.

== Reception ==
No.	Title	Air date	Ratings/Share (18–49)	Viewers (millions)	DVR 18-49	DVR Viewers (millions)	Total 18-49	Total Viewers (millions)	Rank (week)
1	"Girls Disappeared"	September 24, 2014	2.2/6	10.07	1.3	3.13	3.4	13.2	23
2	"American Disgrace"	October 1, 2014	1.8/5	7.73	1.2	3.07	3.0	10.8	—N/a
3	"Producer's Backend"	October 8, 2014	1.7/5	7.61	1.1	2.75	2.8	10.36	—N/a
4	"Holden's Manifesto"	October 15, 2014	1.7/5	7.16	1.1	2.9	2.8	10.04	—N/a
5	"Pornstar's Requiem"	October 22, 2014	1.6/5	7.19	1.2	2.4	2.8	9.6	—N/a
6	"Glasgowman's Wrath"	November 5, 2014	1.6/5	7.00	1.3	3.13	2.9	10.12	—N/a
7	"Chicago Crossover"	November 12, 2014	2.4/7	10.01	1.2	3.1	3.6	13.1	19
8	"Spousal Privilege"	November 19, 2014	1.8/5	7.93	1.1	—N/a	2.9	—N/a	—N/a
9	"Pattern Seventeen"	December 10, 2014	1.4/4	6.90	0.83	2.3	2.26	9.2	
10	"Forgiving Rollins"	January 7, 2015	1.7/5	7.76	0.9	1.1	2.56	9.9	
11	"Agent Provocateur"	January 14, 2015	1.4/4	6.68	0.7	1.9	2.1	8.6	
12	"Padre Sandunguero"	January 21, 2015	1.3/4	6.77	—N/a	—N/a	—N/a	—N/a	—N/a
13	"Decaying Morality"	February 4, 2015	1.3/4	6.20	0.8	2.2	2.1	8.4	
14	"Intimidation Game"	February 11, 2015	1.4/4	6.12	0.8	2.3	2.2	8.4	
15	"Undercover Mother"	February 18, 2015	1.6/5	6.45	—N/a	—N/a	—N/a	—N/a	—N/a
16	"December Solstice"	February 25, 2015	1.7/4	7.72	—N/a	—N/a	—N/a	—N/a	—N/a
17	"Parole Violations"	March 25, 2015	1.3/4	5.92	—N/a	—N/a	—N/a	—N/a	—N/a
18	"Devastating Story"	April 1, 2015	1.5/5	6.25	—N/a	—N/a	—N/a	—N/a	—N/a
19	"Granting Immunity"	April 8, 2015	1.8/5	7.31	—N/a	—N/a	—N/a	—N/a	25
20	"Daydream Believer"	April 29, 2015	2.1/7	9.28	1.5	3.97	3.5	13.22	10
21	"Perverted Justice"	May 6, 2015	1.2/4	6.11	—N/a	—N/a	—N/a	—N/a	—N/a
22	"Parents' Nightmare"	May 13, 2015	1.6/5	6.82	—N/a	—N/a	—N/a	—N/a	—N/a
23	"Surrendering Noah"	May 20, 2015	1.4/5	6.96	—N/a	—N/a	—N/a	—N/a	—N/a
