= Brian Geraghty =

American actor

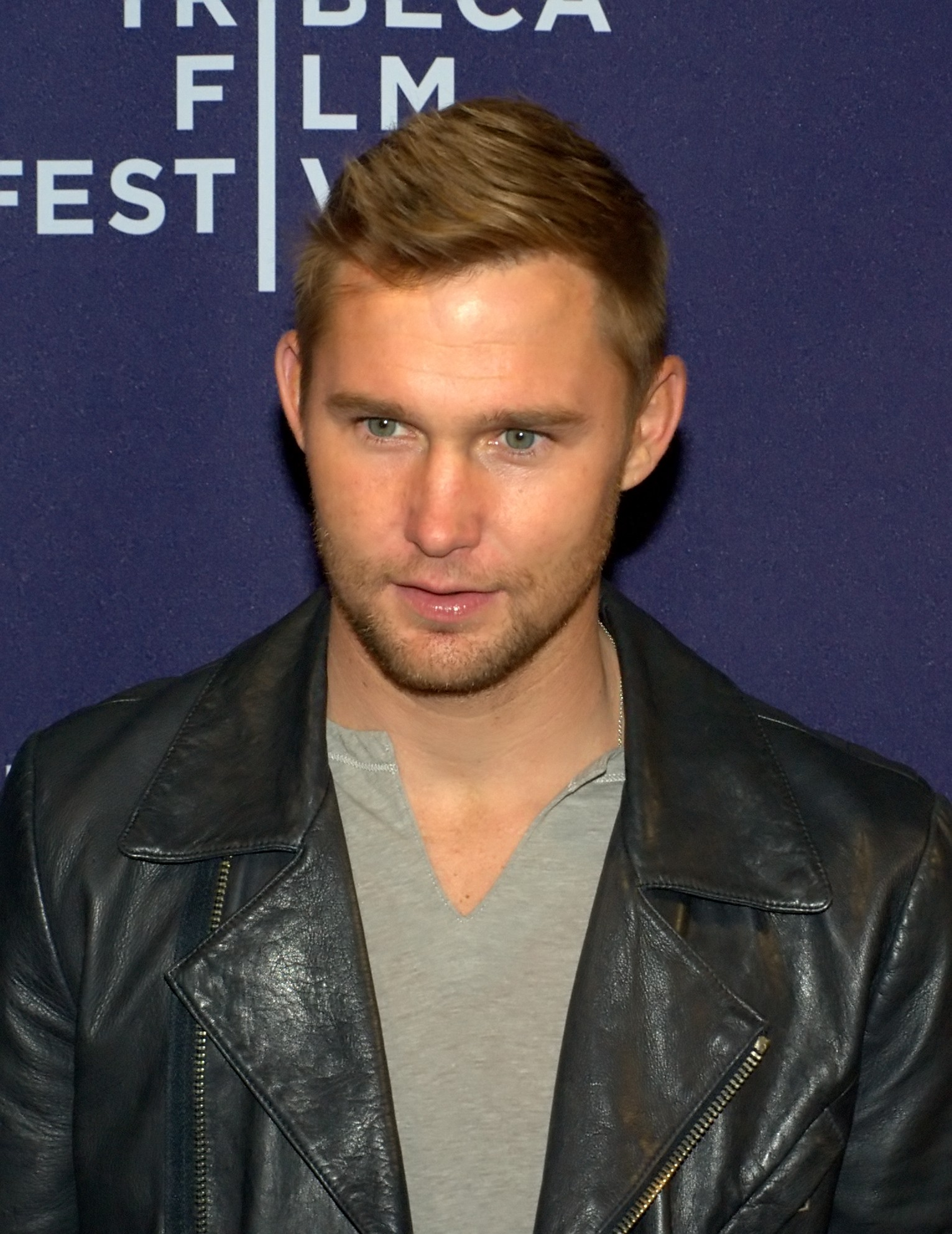
- Geraghty in 2010
- Occupation: Actor
- Years active: 1999–present

Brian Geraghty is an American actor, known for his roles in the 2005 film Jarhead, the 2008 film The Hurt Locker, and the 2012 film Flight, along with his recurring role in the HBO drama series Boardwalk Empire. He appeared as a regular on NBC's Chicago P.D. from 2014 to 2016 and played Theodore Roosevelt in the TV series The Alienist. From 2020 to 2022, he portrayed Ronald Pergman on the ABC thriller drama Big Sky. He had a main role as Ranch Foreman Zane Davis on the Paramount+ western series 1923 (2022–2025).

== Early life ==
Geraghty grew up in Toms River, New Jersey, and is of Irish descent. He graduated from Toms River High School East in 1993 and then studied acting at the Neighborhood Playhouse School of the Theatre before beginning his professional career in New York City; he later moved to Los Angeles.

== Career ==
Geraghty was featured in a small role in the crime drama The Sopranos. Feature roles soon followed, in such pictures as Jarhead, Bobby, The Guardian, We Are Marshall, and The Hurt Locker. He also appeared in an episode of Law & Order: Special Victims Unit, "Quickie", as a man intentionally infecting women with HIV. In 2013, he portrayed Agent Knox on the HBO crime drama series Boardwalk Empire. In August 2014, Geraghty was cast as a series regular on the second season of the NBC procedural Chicago P.D., playing Sean Roman. In 2018, Geraghty starred in the TNT drama The Alienist, as NYPD Police Commissioner Theodore Roosevelt.

== Personal life ==
In his free time, Geraghty enjoys surfing.

== Filmography ==
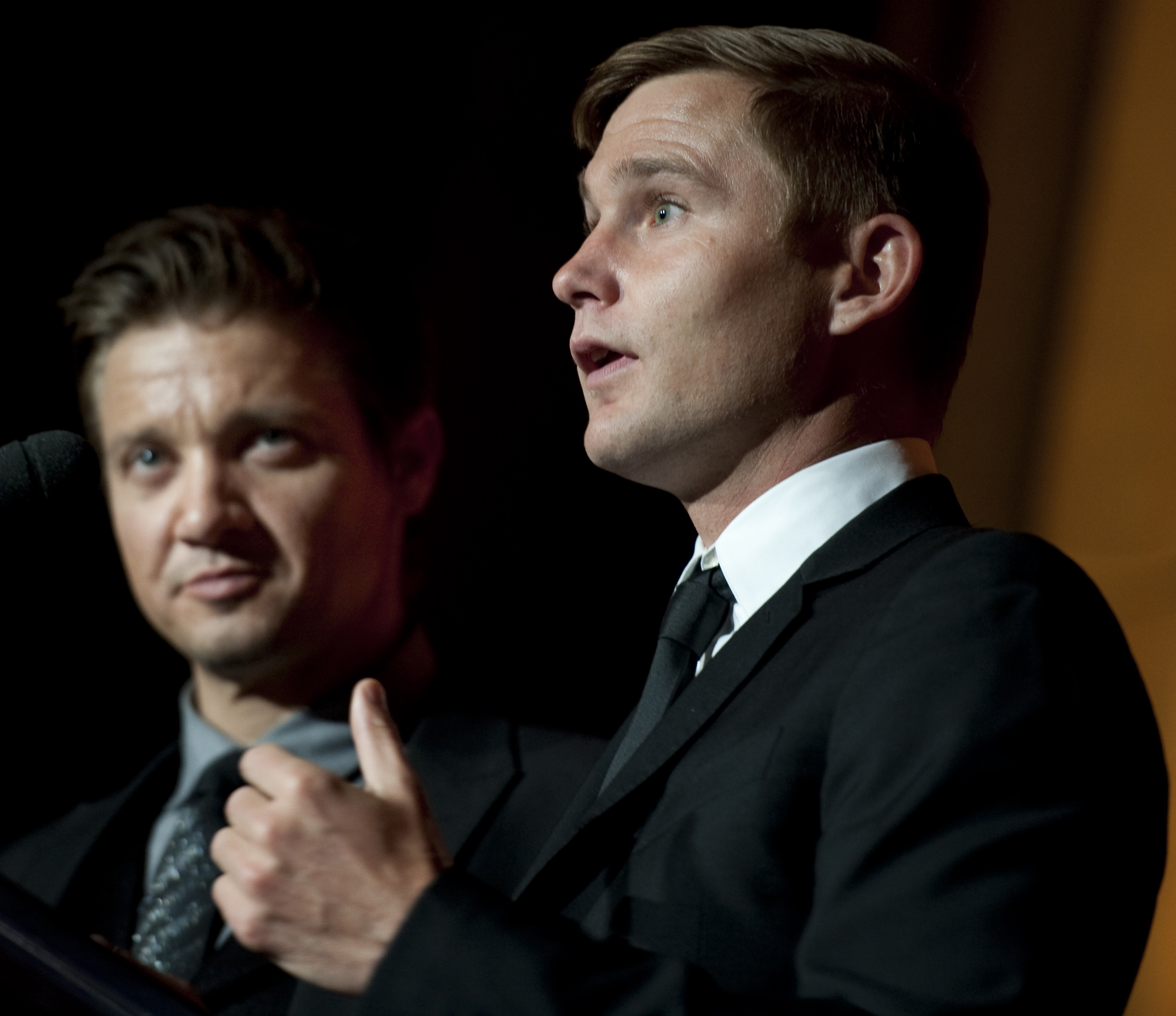
Geraghty with fellow actor Jeremy Renner in April 2010

=== Film ===
Year	Title	Role	Notes
2002	Petty Crimes	Rookie Cop	
2002	Town Diary	Young Frank Ryan	
2003	Earl & Puppy	Terry	Short film
2004	Stateside	Chris	
2005	Conversations with Other Women	Groom	
2005	Cruel World	Collin	
2005	Jarhead	Fergus O'Donnell	
2006	Art School Confidential	Stoob	
2006	Bobby	Jimmy	
2006	The Elder Son	Greg	
2006	The Guardian	Billy Hodge	
2006	We Are Marshall	Tom Bogdan	
2006	When a Stranger Calls	Bobby	
2007	An American Crime	Bradley	
2007	I Know Who Killed Me	Jerrod Pointer	
2008	The Hurt Locker	Owen Eldridge	
2008	Love Lies Bleeding	"Duke"	Direct-to-video
2009	Easier with Practice	Davy Mitchell	
2010	Bastard	Man	Short film
2010	The Chameleon	Brian Jansen	
2010	Krews	Henry McFarlin	
2010	Open House	David	
2010	The Second Bakery Attack	Dan	Short film
2011	Seven Days in Utopia	Jake	
2011	10 Years	Garrity Liamsworth	
2012	ATM	David Hargrove	
2012	Flight	Ken Evans	
2012	Refuge	Sam	
2013	Ass Backwards	Brian Hickman	
2013	Kilimanjaro	Doug	
2014	Date and Switch	Lars	
2014	The Identical	William Hemsley	
2014	Loitering with Intent	Devon	
2014	Wildlike	Uncle	
2017	My Days of Mercy	Weldon	
2017	Avenues	Jack	
2018	The Standoff at Sparrow Creek	Noah	
2019	Extremely Wicked, Shockingly Evil and Vile	Dan Dowd	
2019	Faith	Chris	
2020	Blindfire	Will Bishop	
2024	Red Right Hand	Sheriff Hollister	
2024	The Luckiest Man in America	Ed	
TBA	Kockroach		Post-production

=== Television ===
Year	Title	Role	Notes
1999	Law & Order	Phillip Ludwick	Episode: "Hate"
1999	The Sopranos	Counter Boy	Episode: "The Legend of Tennessee Moltisanti"
2001	Ed	Ari	Episode: "Windows of Opportunity"
2010, 2015	Law & Order: Special Victims Unit	Peter Butler / Sean Roman	Episodes: "Quickie" and "Daydream Believer"
2012	True Blood	Brian Eller	3 episodes
2013	Boardwalk Empire	Warren Knox / Jim Tolliver	Recurring role (season 4)
2014	Ray Donovan	Jim Halloran	Recurring role (season 2)
2014–2020	Chicago P.D.	Sean Roman	Main cast (seasons 2–3); guest (season 7)
2014–2020	Chicago Fire	Sean Roman	Recurring role; 9 episodes
2015–2016	Chicago Med	Sean Roman	Guest role; 3 episodes
2018	The Alienist	Theodore Roosevelt	Main cast
2020	Briarpatch	Gene Colder	Main cast
2020	The Fugitive	Colin Murphy	Main cast
2020–2022	Big Sky	Ronald Pergman	Main cast (seasons 1 & 2)
2022	Gaslit	Peter	Recurring role
2022–2025	1923	Zane Davis	Main cast; miniseries

== Awards and nominations ==
Year	Award	Category	Work	Result
2007	Screen Actors Guild Awards	Outstanding Performance by a Cast in a Motion Picture	Bobby	Nominated
2009	Gotham Awards	Best Ensemble Performance	The Hurt Locker	Won
2009	Washington D.C. Area Film Critics Association Award	Best Ensemble	The Hurt Locker	Won
2010	Screen Actors Guild Award	Outstanding Performance by a Cast in a Motion Picture	The Hurt Locker	Nominated
2014	Screen Actors Guild Award	Outstanding Performance by an Ensemble in a Drama Series	Boardwalk Empire	Nominated
