= Chicago Fire season 3 =

Chicago Fire
- Season 3
- Chicago Fire Season 3 DVD cover
- Showrunners: Matt Olmstead; Michael Brandt; Derek Haas; Dick Wolf
- No. of episodes: 23

Release
- Original network: NBC
- Original release: September 23, 2014 – May 12, 2015

Season chronology
- ← Previous; Season 2 Next → Season 4

The third season of Chicago Fire, an American drama television series with executive producer Dick Wolf, and producers Derek Haas, Michael Brandt, and Matt Olmstead, premiered on Tuesday, September 23, 2014, at 10 pm on NBC television network and concluded on May 12, 2015. The season contained 23 episodes.

== Overview ==
The show follows the lives of the firefighters and paramedics working at the Chicago Fire Department at the firehouse of Engine 51, Truck 81, Squad 3, Ambulance 61 and Battalion 25.

Episode 19 served as a backdoor pilot for a new spin-off, called Chicago Med.

== Cast and characters ==
=== Main cast ===
- Jesse Spencer as Lieutenant Matthew Casey, Truck 81
- Taylor Kinney as Lieutenant Kelly Severide, Squad 3
- Monica Raymund as Paramedic in Charge/Firefighter Candidate Gabriela Dawson, Ambulance 61/Truck 81
- Charlie Barnett as Firefighter/Paramedic in Charge Peter Mills, Squad 3/Ambulance 61
- Kara Killmer as Paramedic Sylvie Brett, Ambulance 61
- David Eigenberg as Firefighter Christopher Herrmann, Truck 81
- Yuri Sardarov as Firefighter Brian "Otis" Zvonecek, Truck 81
- Joe Minoso as Firefighter Joe Cruz, Truck 81/Squad 3
- Christian Stolte as Firefighter Randy "Mouch" McHolland, Truck 81
- Eamonn Walker as Chief Wallace Boden, Battalion 25

=== Recurring ===
- Randy Flagler as Firefighter Harold Capp, Rescue Squad 3
- Anthony Ferraris as Firefighter Tony, Rescue Squad 3
- Edwin Hodge as Firefighter Rick Newhouse, Rescue Squad 3
- Melissa Ponzio as Donna Robbins-Boden
- Warren Christie as Firefighter Scott Rice, Rescue Squad 3
- Gordon Clapp as Chaplain Orlovsky
- Kenny Johnson as Lieutenant Tommy Welch, Truck 66/Firefighter, Rescue Squad 3
- Eric Mabius as Jack Nesbitt
- Yaya DaCosta as April Sexton
- Izabella Miko as Katya
- Richard Roundtree as Wallace Boden, Sr.
- Serinda Swan as Brittany Baker
- Lauren German as Leslie Shay
- Dora Madison as Paramedic in Charge, Jessica "Chili" Chilton, Ambulance 61
- James Russo as Papa Lullo
- Alexandra Metz as Elise Mills
- Joe Keery as Emmett

=== Crossover characters ===
- Amy Morton as Sergeant Trudy Platt
- Brian Geraghty as Officer Sean Roman
- Jon Seda as Detective Antonio Dawson
- Jason Beghe as Sergeant Henry "Hank" Voight
- Marina Squerciati as Officer Kim Burgess
- Jesse Lee Soffer as Detective Jay Halstead
- Nick Gehlfuss as Dr. Will Halstead
- Sophia Bush as Detective Erin Lindsay
- Patrick John Flueger as Officer Adam Ruzek
- LaRoyce Hawkins as Officer Kevin Atwater
- Samuel Hunt as Greg "Mouse" Gerwitz
- Kelli Giddish as Detective Amanda Rollins
- Mariska Hargitay as Sergeant Olivia Benson
- Tamara Tunie as M.E. Melinda Warner

== Episodes ==
No. overall	No. in season	Title	Directed by	Written by	Original release date	Prod. code	U.S. viewers (millions)
47	1	"Always"	Joe Chappelle	Michael Brandt & Derek Haas	September 23, 2014	301	9.14
Following the apartment fire explosion with everyone inside, almost everyone at Firehouse 51 survives, Mills with a broken leg, but Shay is killed on scene leaving everyone mourning her loss. The episode forwards to six weeks later where we find many in the Firehouse have taken her death hard. Severide, having been on leave after the incident, is now AWOL. Eventually, Casey finds him at his cabin where he admits he's reluctant to return. Also, Casey continues to butt heads with Lieutenant Welch at Truck 66, Boden and his wife double date with Mouch and Trudy. Hermann wishes to expand the Molly's brand, and Mills is given information about his father's family, whom his mother had told him moved away.
48	2	"Wow Me"	Tom DiCillo	Andrea Newman	September 30, 2014	302	8.71
Severide returns to Firehouse 51 after Shay's death, but not as his usual self and moves in with Casey and Dawson to cope with his grief. Firehouse 51 receives a call of a man pinned down by a trailer. Mills digs deeper into his family's history. Hermann looks into expanding Molly's. While practicing drills for her candidacy, Dawson receives a surprise proposal from Casey which she accepts.
49	3	"Just Drive the Truck"	Sanford Bookstaver	Michael Gilvary	October 7, 2014	303	8.39
When Truck 81 and Truck 66 from the Austin Firehouse collide, all fingers are pointed towards Cruz for his driving and he could be facing criminal charges. Meanwhile, Cruz, Hermann and Mouch look into trucks for Molly's expansion. Elsewhere, Boden and Casey look into Dawson becoming a candidate for 81. Mills struggles with an unknown injury causing him to blackout.
50	4	"Apologies Are Dangerous"	Steve Shill	Michael Brandt & Ryan Rege Harris	October 14, 2014	304	7.11
Severide gets involved in a subway shooting which questions his position at the firehouse. Meanwhile, Dawson has her first day as a candidate at Firehouse 51 and Mills adjusts to his new role as a Paramedic. Brett's ex-fiancé comes to town to win her back.
51	5	"The Nuclear Option"	Joe Chappelle	Tim Talbott	October 21, 2014	305	7.45
Casey receives some startling news about his sister, she and her husband Jordan are getting a divorce. Casey digs deeper into it and finds out they are broke and Jordan is having an affair and puts him in a difficult position how to tell his sister. Following a call, Hermann reaches out to Boden and questions Dawson as a candidate. Meanwhile, Mills and Dawson settle into their new job roles. Severide continues to drink to help with his grief.
52	6	"Madmen and Fools"	Rod Holcomb	Tiller Russell	October 28, 2014	306	7.23
While on a call the team saves a young boy who has gotten his head stuck in a balcony railing that has given way and is hanging precariously. Later, the boy is taken away from his mother for a past charge of neglect and abuse. Brett gets emotionally involved when the mother begs for her help, something Severide advises her not to do. After investigating, Brett and Severide vouch for the mother and pressure child services to return the boy. Following the call, Dawson asks Hermann to give her more training and have some faith in her while on calls to which he agrees, although he rides her to do extensive training. Casey is pulling out all the stops to ensure his sister does not get railroaded in the divorce. It turns out his sister signed away her rights without understanding what she was doing. With the help of Newhouse, he is able to find dirt on Jim and his mistress and is able to push him into submission. Later, Mills accompanies Newhouse on a task for his side gig to retrieve a stolen dog. Later that night Newhouse is attacked by an unknown assailant. Severide and the rest of squad prepare for their Vegas trip. When everyone backs out at the last minute, Severide asks Brett to go with him but she turns him down and says it would be a bad idea. Severide is alone in Vegas at the craps table down to his last four $25 chips when he meets a mysterious woman (played by Serinda Swan) with whom a mutual attraction is obvious. She rolls the dice for him as his 'Lucky charm' and wins twice in a row and Severide kisses her.
53	7	"Nobody Touches Anything"	Alex Chapple	Story by : Dick Wolf & Jill Weinberger; Teleplay by : Matt Olmstead & Jill Weinberger	November 11, 2014	307	9.06
Severide returns to the Firehouse and tells everyone that he got married in Vegas, leaving everyone stunned and skeptical. Mills is worried about Newhouse and his off-duty activities. Casey and Dawson lets Severide's wife Brittany move in with them and Severide. Firehouse 51 receives a call of a woman in a burning flipped car and race against the clock to rescue her. Mills and Brett deal with a crackhead. Brett discovers Cruz's hidden talent. In the next call, a basement fire, Severide discovers a box of pictures of young children on the victim he rescued and realizes it is a crime scene of a pornographic ring. This episode begins a crossover with Law & Order: Special Victims Unit and Chicago P.D. that continues on "Chicago Crossover" (Law & Order: Special Victims Unit, season 16, episode 7) and concludes on "They'll Have to Go Through Me" (Chicago P.D., season 2, episode 7). It is included on the Law & Order: Special Victims Unit Season 16 and Chicago P.D. Season 2 DVD sets. Guest Stars: Jason Beghe as Hank Voight; Sophia Bush as Erin Lindsay; Kelli Giddish as Amanda Rollins
54	8	"Chopper"	Jann Turner	Derek Haas & Michael A. O'Shea	November 18, 2014	308	7.75
Firehouse 51 receives a call of a helicopter crash onto a building causing many injuries and major chaos throughout the Chicago neighborhood. It was later revealed that a remote control flying drone caused the helicopter to crash. Boden and Donna go to a doctor's appointment about their upcoming child. Dawson and Casey's relationship is tested, while Severide's new romance escalates.
55	9	"Arrest in Transit"	Jean de Segonzac	Andrea Newman	November 25, 2014	309	6.02
Dawson and Casey's relationship hits a new low when Casey shows discipline at call of a leaking tanker. Cruz develops feelings for Brett and expresses them to her. Mills faces fallout by the father of a teenager that died shortly after an accident at a swimming pool. The outraged father happens to be an organized criminal. Severide shows his new wife Brittany around the firehouse and it prompts her to reveal her own tragedy. Brittany admits to Severide she feels as responsible for her sister's death in a car crash as he once felt for Shay's death. Severide and Brittany share a reluctant goodbye at the railroad station when she decides to reconcile with her family in Florida.
56	10	"Santa Bites"	Holly Dale	Michael Brandt & Derek Haas	December 2, 2014	310	7.36
Firehouse 51 receives a call of a house fire. Mills deals with the fallout of the DOA from a previous call until the dead boy's mob father apologizes for threatening him. On an ambulance call to an alley, Mills and Brett are kidnapped by thugs. Dawson and Casey's relationship takes a dramatic turn. The crews help the chaplain raise money to keep a soup kitchen alive. Boden anxiously awaits the arrival of his new child. Molly's II has its grand opening.
57	11	"Let Him Die"	Steve Shill	Michael Gilvary	January 6, 2015	311	6.77
Firehouse 51 teams up will the Intelligence unit to track down the whereabouts of Brett and Mills. The kidnappers may be involved with the mobster who'd previously threatened but then apologised to Mills over the accidental death of his son. Elsewhere, Hermann bonds with Boden while his newborn son is fighting for his life under respiratory distress in the hospital. Boden and Donna receive a surprise visit from out of town Boden's father.
58	12	"Ambush Predator"	Joe Chappelle	Story by : Steve Chikerotis & Tiller Russell; Teleplay by : Tiller Russell	January 13, 2015	312	6.66
Following the discovery of a newspaper clipping containing Shay's death notice found at a call, Severide and Dawson look into the storage building fire where Shay was killed last year. Intelligence is brought in to investigate the scene. Firehouse 51 receives a call of a car accident of a victim of one of their own. Meanwhile, Hermann drafts Otis and Cruz into his Little League games. Boden and Donna bond with Boden's father. Mills and Brett receive a call of domestic violence in which the victim does not want to receive treatment.
59	13	"Three Bells"	Arthur W. Forney	Jill Weinberger	February 3, 2015	313	6.52
Severide begins to develop a case against an arsonist that killed Shay. He later finds out that the arsonist has multiple kills. Meanwhile, Shay's sister comes to Firehouse 51 and goes on ride alongs with the house. Elsewhere, Otis' Grandma stays with him and Cruz without Cruz's permission. Later, Firehouse 51 celebrates Shay's life with a memorial service. This episode begins a crossover with Chicago P.D. that concludes on "A Little Devil Complex". It is included on the Chicago P.D. Season 2 DVD set. Guest stars: Marina Squerciati as Kim Burgess; Brian Geraghty as Sean Roman; Jon Seda as Antonio Dawson
60	14	"Call It Paradise"	Reza Tabrizi	Matt Olmstead & Michael A. O'Shea	February 10, 2015	314	6.29
It's a freezing cold day in Chicago, ambulance 61 has broken down and the weather has shut down 9-1-1 as well as other city services. While salting the sidewalk, Dawson discovers an infant girl in a cardboard box who she takes a liking to. When the mother shows up, Dawson is apprehensive about releasing the baby and is told to wait for child services. Dawson eventually tricks the woman into revealing she isn't the girl's mother and the woman pulls a gun and demands Dawson hand over the baby. The rest of the house return and the woman is convinced to leave and flees. The baby is later revealed to have been kidnapped. Elsewhere, Brett and Mills go on a call and find one teenager on drugs and another missing. When Brett goes looking for her, the girl falls into a pit and is pinned by rebar. Thanks to Cruz checking in on them, Truck 81 and Squad 3 are eventually able to rescue them. Boden's father is able to throw his party as a winter luau at Molly's. At the party, Casey meets a young woman and they go to her home together, Severide goes home and watches old tapes of Shay, and Boden and his father sit by the fire where he quietly passes away with his son hugging him and crying.
61	15	"Headlong Toward Disaster"	Joe Chappelle	Michael Gilvary	February 17, 2015	315	6.26
Following his father's death, Boden takes time off to finish his father's affairs and to grieve. Chief Pridgen fills in for Boden but Casey and his men find themselves doubting the Chief's judgment during a call that went wrong. Pridgen's insults after Otis slips on a waxy bowling lane during an injury rescue further unnerve the 51 crew. Severide refuses Pridgen's request to help him find dirt on Casey. An unwelcome familiar face comes to Firehouse 51 to fill in a void in Squad 3—disgraced former firehouse commander Welch. Elsewhere, Casey finds out that the woman he had hooked up with is the new Chief's soon-to-be ex-wife and Brett gets a special visitor.
62	16	"Red Rag the Bull"	Sanford Bookstaver	Tiller Russell	March 3, 2015	316	9.07
Mouch receives news that one of his sperm donations is made public and has a teenage son and considers meeting him. Firehouse 51 comes under investigation following an incident at the previous call and Chief Pridgen throws Casey under the bus for the bad call. Severide's loyalty is tested and Lieutenant Welch is given an ultimatum which could have repercussions on his future. Elsewhere, Brett and Cruz try to set up Dawson on a date. Chief Pridgen gets relieved of his position, right before he asks Welch to leave for not lying for him, leaving Boden a chance to return to 51 sooner.
63	17	"Forgive You Anything"	Reza Tabrizi	Story by : Dick Wolf & Matt Olmstead; Teleplay by : Andrea Newman	March 10, 2015	317	8.57
Boden returns to Firehouse 51 following his absence from the department to take care of his new child and his late father's personal affairs. 51 receives a call of a parking garage accident that turns dangerous. Meanwhile, Severide helps an old friend, Scott Rice, return to the firehouse while Mills fights for his position back on squad. Also, Mouch has regrets about not meeting his biological child. Severide runs into an old high school friend, April Sexton, a nurse at Chicago Med. Severide invites her to Molly's to catch up and she declines. Elsewhere, Dawson and Brett have a girls night out and Brett rethinks her life and why she moved in Chicago. Casey gets a contracting job to renovate the room next to a strip club from a former firefighter. Later, Mouch meets his biological daughter, Lizzie.
64	18	"Forgiving, Relentless, Unconditional"	Karyn Kusama	Michael A. O'Shea & Jill Weinberger	March 17, 2015	318	6.96
Scott, April and Kelly meet for breakfast without Kelly or April knowing each other would be there. Brett considers breaking up with Cruz and tries to avoid him at work. Mills sister returns and turns out their paternal grandfather passed away. 51 receives a call of an apartment fire with an infant in critical condition and the blame shifts toward the father. It is later revealed that the father is a crack addict and has dealt with child neglect by smoking crack in front of his child and blowing it in the child's face, which makes Hermann furious. Also, 51 shows up to a scene where a girl is pinned to a wall with a car. Severide grows closer to April. Hermann goes after the father and things get physical but Casey stops him. Cruz breaks up with Brett. Mills continues to fight for his spot back on squad while learning his paternal grandfather left his family a restaurant in North Carolina and his sister tries to convince him to keep it. Otis thinks he's in love with Brett. Casey calls the chaplain to help Hermann. Mills finds out he has been cleared for Squad. Kelly goes to see April's parents.
65	19	"I Am the Apocalypse"	Joe Chappelle	Story by : Dick Wolf & Matt Olmstead; Teleplay by : Michael Brandt & Derek Haas	April 7, 2015	319	8.43
The team transports victims of a chemical leak to Chicago Med. Will begins his first day at Chicago Med. A bad situation turns even worse when a grenade-carrying madman who claims to have a deadly airborne disease causes an explosion in the ER. After the explosion everybody starts to panic and begin to flee with the doctors telling everyone to stay put and puts Chicago Med on lock down leaving Casey, Hermann, Otis, Dawson, Brett, and Mills inside. Severide is severely injured and considered a black tag but Mills refuses to give up. Halstead and Ruzek investigate the explosion. Kelly is forced to have emergency surgery, during which he has flashbacks of Shay. Casey and Dawson reunite. Severide wakes up and tells April, he doesn't remember the explosion. This episode serves as the backdoor pilot for Chicago Med. Guest stars: Jesse Lee Soffer as Jay Halstead; Patrick John Flueger as Adam Ruzek; Jon Seda as Antonio Dawson
66	20	"You Know Where to Find Me"	Jean de Segonzac	Michael Gilvary	April 21, 2015	320	6.72
Peter gets the chance to be on Squad again while Rice covers Severide's position with him on medical leave. Dawson gets stuck back on the ambo while Boden finds someone permanent to replace Mills. 51 responds to a call where a man is impaled on a lamppost. Kelly visits April after he hears she doesn't work at the hospital because she wants to take a break and travel the world. Casey remodels a strip club on the side, but has doubts about its owner, a former firefighter. Hermann, Otis and Cruz prepare their team for the peewee hockey championship. Kelly and April spend the night together. While still considering whether to join his mother and sister in re-opening a North Carolina restaurant left them by Mills's grandfather, Mills saves the life of a man in a car accident. Jack offers Casey the chance to build more strip clubs. Firehouse 51 has a farewell party at Molly's as Peter Mills decides to leave his friends and his firefighting career to move to North Carolina to be with is family and the restaurant. Mills says goodbye to Dawson with a kiss. Guest stars: Marina Squerciati as Kim Burgess
67	21	"We Called Her Jellybean"	Joe Chappelle	Story by : Matt Olmstead & Tiller Russell; Teleplay by : Tiller Russell	April 28, 2015	321	6.85
Chili is introduced as the new PIC on Ambulance 61 with a not so enthusiastic welcoming. 51 responds to an apartment fire linked to a case of rape and attempted murder. Otis notices Rice running out of the fire while everyone else was running in so he and Cruz get suspicious. Casey starts asking around for information about Jack Nesbitt, former firefighter. Dawson and Severvide look into the apartment fire for signs of arson and find an eyewitness. Members of the CPD team up with the Special Victims Unit to investigate, which has similar characteristics to cases that has eluded SVU for more than 10 years. Hermann becomes interested in Chili's new developing project. Dawson helps the landlord of the apartment fire from committing suicide because he believes he started the fire. Severide confronts Otis and Cruz about their suspicions of Rice. Casey goes looking for Jack at the back of his club and walks in on him and he is not pleased. Casey declines his offer for building new strip clubs. This episode begins a crossover with Chicago P.D. and Law & Order: Special Victims Unit that continues on "The Number of Rats" (Chicago P.D. Season 2 Episode 20) and concludes on "Daydream Believer" (Law & Order: Special Victims Unit Season 16 Episode 20). It is included on the Law & Order: Special Victims Unit Season 16 and Chicago P.D. Season 2 DVD sets. Guest stars: Mariska Hargitay as Olivia Benson; Jason Beghe as Hank Voight; Jon Seda as Antonio Dawson
68	22	"Category 5"	Dan Lerner	Andrea Newman	May 5, 2015	322	6.76
Tensions run high when Otis continues to accuse Scott of his wrongdoings, which continues to irritate Severide and leads to an altercation with the truck team. Severide later asks him about it. Elsewhere, Voight contacts Casey about his previous encounter with the strip club owner, Jack, and finds out Jack is running a female trafficking ring, which forces Casey to go undercover. Also, Hermann invests into Chili's idea.
69	23	"Spartacus"	Michael Brandt	Michael Brandt & Derek Haas	May 12, 2015	323	6.66
Tensions continue to run high at a call when the squad goes in a gas-filled house without approval. Severide later finds out that Otis' accusation is true and Scott is kicked off the squad. Cruz receives a letter in the mail telling him that he passed his squad certification and is now on the squad. Elsewhere, Casey continues to go undercover to bust the strip club owner for human trafficking. Also, Hermann, Chili and Otis continue to invest in Chili's idea of chilled champagne and try to get a celebrity spokesperson to promote it.

== Production ==
NBC renewed Chicago Fire for a third season on March 19, 2014 which premiered on September 23 that same year.

=== Crossovers ===
On September 29, 2014, it was announced that Wolf's shows Chicago P.D., Chicago Fire and Law & Order: Special Victims Unit would be doing a three-part crossover event on November 11–12, 2014, starting with Chicago Fire and ending with Law & Order: Special Victims Unit, and Chicago P.D. On January 22, 2015, another crossover between Chicago Fire, Law & Order: Special Victims Unit, and Chicago P.D. was announced, to have "more integrated storytelling" than the first. The episodes aired on April 28–29, 2015.

== Ratings ==
Viewership and ratings per episode of Chicago Fire season 3
No.	Title	Air date	Rating/share (18–49)	Viewers (millions)	Total (18–49)	Total viewers (millions)
1	"Always"	September 23, 2014	2.6/8	9.14	3.7	12.75
2	"Wow Me"	September 30, 2014	2.3/7	8.71	3.4	12.32
3	"Just Drive the Truck"	October 7, 2014	2.1/7	8.39	3.2	11.91
4	"Apologies Are Dangerous"	October 14, 2014	1.9/6	7.11	3.0	10.67
5	"The Nuclear Option"	October 21, 2014	1.9/6	7.45	3.0	10.81
6	"Madmen and Fools"	October 28, 2014	1.7/5	7.23	2.7	10.52
7	"Nobody Touches Anything"	November 11, 2014	2.2/7	9.06	3.7	13.29
8	"Chopper"	November 18, 2014	2.1/6	7.75	—	10.94
9	"Arrest in Transit"	November 25, 2014	1.6/5	6.02	2.8	9.84
10	"Santa Bites"	December 2, 2014	1.7/5	7.36	2.8	10.94
11	"Let Him Die"	January 6, 2015	1.7/5	6.77	2.9	10.29
12	"Ambush Predator"	January 13, 2015	1.5/5	6.66	2.5	9.92
13	"Three Bells"	February 3, 2015	1.6/5	6.52	2.7	10.07
14	"Call It Paradise"	February 10, 2015	1.4/5	6.29	2.6	9.90
15	"Headlong Toward Disaster"	February 17, 2015	1.4/4	6.26	2.5	9.85
16	"Red Rag the Bull"	March 3, 2015	2.1/7	9.07	3.2	12.50
17	"Forgive You Anything"	March 10, 2015	2.1/7	8.57	3.2	11.92
18	"Forgiving, Relentless, Unconditional"	March 17, 2015	1.6/5	6.96	2.7	10.37
19	"I Am the Apocalypse"	April 7, 2015	2.0/6	8.43	—	—
20	"You Know Where to Find Me"	April 21, 2015	1.6/5	6.72	—	—
21	"We Called Her Jellybean"	April 28, 2015	1.6/5	6.85	—	—
22	"Category 5"	May 5, 2015	1.6/5	6.76	—	—
23	"Spartacus"	May 12, 2015	1.5/5	6.66	—	—

== Home media ==
The DVD release of season three was released in Region 1 on September 1, 2015.

The Complete Third Season
Set details			Special features
23 episodes; 1,183 minutes (Region 1); 6-disc set; 1.78:1 aspect ratio; Languages: English (Dolby Digital 5.1); Subtitles: English (Region 1)			Behind the Scenes; Chicago P.D. Season 2 Crossover Episodes; "They'll Have to Go Through Me"; "A Little Devil Complex"; "The Number of Rats"; Law & Order: SVU Season 16 Crossover Episodes; "Chicago Crossover"; "Daydream Believer"
Release dates			Behind the Scenes; Chicago P.D. Season 2 Crossover Episodes; "They'll Have to Go Through Me"; "A Little Devil Complex"; "The Number of Rats"; Law & Order: SVU Season 16 Crossover Episodes; "Chicago Crossover"; "Daydream Believer"
United States	United Kingdom	Australia	Behind the Scenes; Chicago P.D. Season 2 Crossover Episodes; "They'll Have to Go Through Me"; "A Little Devil Complex"; "The Number of Rats"; Law & Order: SVU Season 16 Crossover Episodes; "Chicago Crossover"; "Daydream Believer"
September 1, 2015			Behind the Scenes; Chicago P.D. Season 2 Crossover Episodes; "They'll Have to Go Through Me"; "A Little Devil Complex"; "The Number of Rats"; Law & Order: SVU Season 16 Crossover Episodes; "Chicago Crossover"; "Daydream Believer"
