= Peter Scanavino =

American actor (born 1980)

- Born: Peter Muller Scanavino; February 29, 1980 (age 46); Denver, Colorado, U.S.
- Occupation: Actor
- Years active: 2005–present
- Spouse: Lisha Bai
- Children: 3

Peter Muller Scanavino (born February 29, 1980) is an American actor. He stars as detective turned ADA Dominick "Sonny" Carisi Jr. in the long-running NBC crime/legal drama series Law & Order: Special Victims Unit.

== Early life ==
Scanavino grew up in Evergreen, Colorado, a community in the foothills of the Denver metropolitan area. He is of partial Italian descent through his paternal grandfather, who emigrated from Turin. Both his parents were in the medical field but encouraged him and his older brother to pursue the arts. He had no inclination towards acting until he participated in a high school production of Hamlet.

Scanavino studied at Boston University and decided to change his major to acting, but did not pass the audition. He dropped out and moved to New York City where he took classes at Lee Strasberg Theatre and Film Institute.

== Career ==
Since 2005, Scanavino has had dozens of minor roles in theater, films and on television, most notably Deception (2008), The Good Wife, and The Blacklist.

In 2005, Scanavino guest-starred on the NBC crime-drama series Law & Order: Criminal Intent in the fifth-season episode "Diamond Dogs" as petty criminal Johnny Feist. He was also a guest on Law & Order as a suspect who was a graphic designer in the 2009 episode "Just a Girl in the World".

In 2010, Scanavino took some time away from acting to pursue his interest in cooking. After graduating with a certificate in Culinary Arts from The French Culinary Institute in New York, he began a brief stint working in the kitchen of Dan Barber's Michelin-starred restaurant Blue Hill in Greenwich Village.

In 2013, Scanavino guest-starred on the long-running NBC crime-drama series Law & Order: Special Victims Unit in Season 14, Episode 13, "Monster's Legacy", as Johnny Dubcek. The same year, he starred in the independent romantic-comedy film Mutual Friends, directed by Matthew Watts.

In 2014, Scanavino joined SVU in its sixteenth season, this time as Dominick Carisi Jr., nicknamed Sonny, a new SVU detective. Initially in a recurring capacity, Scanavino was promoted to the main cast in the fifth episode of the same season. According to SVU Executive Producer Warren Leight, Carisi "come[s] in and shake[s] things up" and is "a guy who maybe needs a little bit of refining."

Scanavino noted that Carisi is "a total outsider. He's brusque and he doesn't really get the nuances and he's not very experienced so he puts his foot in his mouth a lot of times. But he's learning. He's picking it up. I think he's a good detective, but he's got a lot to learn on how to approach cases."

Scanavino starred in an episode of Netflix's 2020 anthology series Social Distance as the father of his real-life son, Leo Bai-Scanavino.

== Personal life ==
Scanavino is married to painter Lisha Bai, with whom he has three children.

== Filmography ==
=== Film ===
Year	Title	Role	Notes
2006	On the Shoulder	Gus	
2006	Under Surveillance	Cult leader	
2008	Deception	Rhiga desk clerk	
2008	The Informers	Leon	
2010	Happythankyoumoreplease	Ira	
2010	Zenith	Jack	
2011	Javelina	Chance	
2012	Watching TV with the Red Chinese	Czapinczyk	
2012	Frances Ha	Chef	
2013	The Cold Lands	Carter	
2013	Mutual Friends	Nate	

=== Television ===
Year	Title	Role	Notes
2005	Jonny Zero	Travis	Episode: "No Good Deed"
2005	Third Watch	Stephen	2 episodes
2005	Law & Order: Trial by Jury	Robert Hassel	Episode: "Boys Will Be Boys"
2005	Law & Order: Criminal Intent	Johnny Feist	Episode: "Diamond Dogs"
2006	The Bedford Diaries	Gunther Halstead	2 episodes
2009	Royal Pains	Mr. Blackman	Episode: "Am I Blue?"
2009, 2022, 2025	Law & Order	Jim Anderson	Episode: "Just a Girl in the World"
2009, 2022, 2025	Law & Order	ADA Dominick "Sonny" Carisi, Jr.	2 episodes
2010	Old Friends	Co-worker	Web series; episode: "Sunday"
2012	A Gifted Man	Scotty Cartolano	Episode: "In Case of Letting Go"
2012	The Good Wife	Grant Duverney	Episode: "Gloves Come Off"
2013	Do No Harm	Kyle Corrigan	Episode: "Don't Answer the Phone"
2013	Golden Boy	Eddie Roque	Episode: "Next Question"
2013	Unforgettable	Alex	Episode: "Maps & Legends"
2013–present	Law & Order: Special Victims Unit	Johnny Dubcek	Episode: "Monster's Legacy"
2013–present	Law & Order: Special Victims Unit	Det./ADA Dominick Carisi, Jr.	Series regular
2014	Banshee	Breece Connors	Episode: "The Thunder Man"
2014	The Blacklist	Christopher Maly/Craig Keen	Episode: "Milton Bobbit (No. 135)"
2014	Person of Interest	Adams	Episode: "Deus Ex Machina"
2014	The Leftovers	Skinny	Episode: "Two Boats and a Helicopter"
2015	Chicago P.D.	Detective Dominick "Sonny" Carisi, Jr.	Episode: "The Number of Rats"
2020	Social Distance	Greg	Episode: "You Gotta Ding-Dong Fling-Flong the Whole Narrative"
2021–2025	Law & Order: Organized Crime	ADA Dominick "Sonny" Carisi, Jr.	4 episodes
