= Manhattan Vigil =

- Law & Order: Special Victims Unit episode
- Episode no.: Season 14; Episode 5
- Directed by: Jean de Segonzac
- Written by: Peter Blauner
- Production code: 14005
- Original air date: October 24, 2012

Guest appearances
- Hamish Linklater as David Morris; Mili Avital as Laurie Colfax; Alex Karpovsky as Steve Lomatin; Liza Colón-Zayas as Delores Rodriguez; Tom Sizemore as Lewis Hodda; Madison McKinley as Claire; Jenna Wolfe as Herself; Ramsey Faragallah as Rudy Singh; Sue Kim as Detective Emily Ling; Gordana Rashovich as Mrs. Lomatin; Luke Fava as Wyatt Morris

Episode chronology
← Previous "Acceptable Loss"	Next → "Friending Emily"
- Law & Order: Special Victims Unit season 14

"Manhattan Vigil" is the fifth episode of the fourteenth season of the American police procedural Law & Order: Special Victims Unit, and the 300th overall. It first aired on October 24, 2012, on the NBC network in the United States. The episode's plot focuses on the kidnapping of a young boy from the subway in Morningside Heights. Captain Donald Cragen (Dann Florek), Sergeant John Munch (Richard Belzer) and Detective Olivia Benson (Mariska Hargitay) realize the case echoes a similar kidnapping in the same neighborhood 13 years prior. As the SVU squad try to find the missing child, they also try to solve the earlier case and learn from their mistakes.

The episode was written by Peter Blauner and directed by Jean de Segonzac. The story was conceived in July 2011, but it was not intended to be the 300th episode until late in its development, when Dick Wolf noticed that it contained qualities that made up the main show. Showrunner Warren Leight wanted "Manhattan Vigil" to have various references to the show's first episode, "Payback," and several actors from the pilot made appearances in "Manhattan Vigil." Filming for the episode began on September 17, 2012. de Segonzac merged footage from the show's first season into the episode, to portray the detective's flashbacks to the previous case, which did not occur previously in the series.

"Manhattan Vigil" was seen by 6.77 million viewers, making it the most watched program on NBC that night and the third most watched program in its timeslot. Critical response was mostly positive, with one critic calling it "a gut-wrenching story," while another said the opening scene gave him "goosebumps." However, Kristen Elizabeth from TV Equals did not think it was interesting enough, and said previous episodes contained better interrogation scenes. Several critics chose the episode as their highlight or show of the week. The storyline was revisited in the season 17 episode "Depravity Standard" on November 18, 2015.

== Plot ==
In 1999, Dolores Rodriguez (Liza Colón-Zayas) puts up posters for her missing son, Hector. The following year, Dolores prays for her son by his wall, while David (Hamish Linklater) and Laurie Morris (Mili Avital), pass by with their newborn. In the present day, a newly divorced David collects his son Wyatt (Luke Fava) on the way to a baseball game. While they are in the subway, a man in a red baseball cap points out that David has dropped a $20 bill and when David picks it up, the man grabs Wyatt and takes him onto the train. After the train leaves, David goes up to the street to call 911. Detectives Olivia Benson (Mariska Hargitay) and Nick Amaro (Danny Pino) arrive on scene and Benson recognizes the neighborhood and remembers Hector Rodriguez's disappearance. After receiving conflicting eyewitness statements, the detectives initially suspect Laurie or David, as they are in a custody battle. David later reveals that he and Wyatt went to a café, and the waitress (Madison McKinley) remembers seeing a man that matches the suspect.

Detectives Amanda Rollins (Kelli Giddish), Fin Tutuola (Ice-T) and John Munch (Richard Belzer) question a shopkeeper (Ramsey Faragallah) who saw Wyatt with a man in a red baseball cap. The man bought hair dye and Munch recognises the M.O. is the same as Hector's kidnapper. The detectives start to believe that Wyatt and Hector's cases are linked. Benson and Amaro speak with Hector's mother and learn that she received a letter from police officer Steve Lomatin (Alex Karpovsky), who found Hector's lunchbox. When Lomatin later finds Wyatt's baseball cap, he is taken in for questioning. Lomatin shows Rollins and Fin his archive, explaining that there is a connection between the disappearance of young boys and fires in their neighborhood shortly after. Lomatin believes that the kidnapper is placing the bodies of the boys in old buildings and then setting them on fire to hide the evidence.

Rollins finds that there were no fires after Hector disappeared, but a nearby building had its basement floor concreted after a flood. Captain Donald Cragen (Dann Florek) gives the order to dig up the floor and Hector's body is found. Upon learning that his father owns the building that Hector's body was found in, David helps the detectives locate the building manager, Lewis Hoda (Tom Sizemore), who he is in a dispute with. The detectives take Lewis in for questioning. He admits to setting the building fires and Amaro eventually gets him to confess to kidnapping Wyatt. Benson retrieves Wyatt from a warehouse and he is reunited with his parents. Benson later comforts Delores at Hector's wall mural.

== Production ==
=== Conception ===
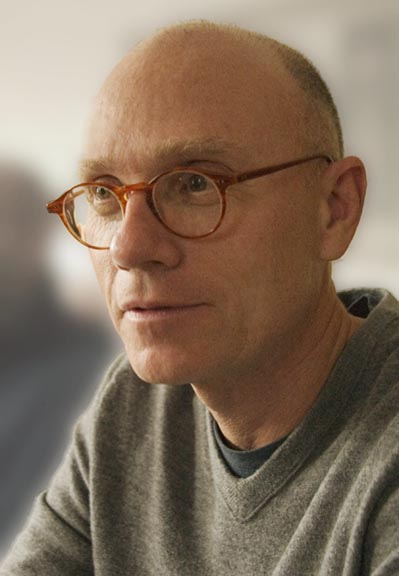
Jean de Segonzac directed both "Manhattan Vigil" and the show's 1999 pilot episode.

A 2006 short story written by Peter Blauner called Going, Going, Gone served as inspiration for the episode. It was not initially intended to be the 300th episode until late in its development. The show's creator, Dick Wolf, explained that as the story developed, it started to contain qualities that make up the main show and it became the 300th "because it was an opportunity to do some things creatively that the show has never done before, which is using the lifespan of the show as a story point in a landmark episode." The series' showrunner Warren Leight wanted "Manhattan Vigil" to have references to the show's pilot episode, which was broadcast on September 20, 1999.

While previous milestone episodes have been marked with celebrity guest stars, Leight said the 300th would focus on Detectives Donald Cragen (Florek), John Munch (Belzer) and Olivia Benson (Hargitay). As they were still around after 13 years, Leight decided they should have more to do. The episode also contains flashbacks to the show's first season. The plot centers on present and past missing child cases. When a seven-year-old boy is kidnapped on the subway during the present day, it echoes a similar case involving a boy from the same location. Leight teased, "Munch and Benson remember that case and see parallels. It's a question of maybe some incomplete police work from the past coming back 13 years later."

=== Filming ===
Filming for the episode began on September 17, 2012. "Manhattan Vigil" was directed by Jean de Segonzac, who had previously directed 18 other Law & Order: Special Victims Unit episodes, including the show's pilot. de Segonzac called the script "very, very heartfelt" and wanted the opening vignette to have a "breathless quality" about it. Ann Farmer from the Directors Guild of America observed that de Segonzac's opening also had a sense of trepidation and the director told her that was the intention. He continued, "My job is to translate the written scenes into vivid, real moments, keeping up the momentum and the urgency without losing the story's thread." When Benson experiences flashbacks to the kidnapping case 13 years earlier, de Segonzac opted against using make-up and clothing to make Hargitay look younger. Instead, he decided to use an experimental technique of merging the episode's scenes with footage from the show's first season to make it seem like Benson was having flashbacks to the case, which did not occur in the series. The director hoped that people would not notice the scenes were filmed in different areas of New York.

=== Casting ===
On September 19, it was announced that actors Tom Sizemore, Hamish Linklater and Alex Karpovsky would appear in the episode. Leight explained that Linklater would play a successful businessman, whose son is taken, while Karpovsky was cast as a police officer and Sizemore as an employee of Linklater's character's family. Actors Mili Avital and Gordana Rashovich, who appeared in the pilot episode, made guest appearances in "Manhattan Vigil". Leight described their appearances as "a fun Easter egg" for viewers. Chris Orbach, the son of Law & Order actor Jerry Orbach, reprised his role as Detective Ken Briscoe from the first season. However, Orbach's scenes were later cut from the episode and Wolf commented, "it has nothing to do with anything other than the needs of a constantly shrinking format." Journalist and Today Show correspondent Jenna Wolfe also made a cameo appearance as herself in the episode.

== Reception ==
=== Ratings ===
In its original American broadcast, "Manhattan Vigil" was viewed by 6.77 million viewers and acquired a 1.9 rating/5% share in the age 18–49 demographic. The episode was the most watched program on NBC that night and the third most watched program in its time slot, behind ABC's Modern Family and CBS's Criminal Minds. In Australia, the episode attracted 681,000 viewers, making it the most watched Network Ten program and the 15th most watched show overall on November 1, 2012. "Manhattan Vigil" was watched by 199,000 viewers, when it aired on UK channel Universal. It was the most watched show on the channel for the week ending 11 November 2012.

=== Critical response ===
Former sex crimes prosecutor Allison Leotta, writing for The Huffington Post, gave the episode a B+. She branded the episode "a gut-wrenching story" and observed that it "showcased the dramatic chops that have made Law and Order: Special Victims Unit a television staple for the last 14 years. I teared up – twice." However, Leotta chastised the show for cutting "legal corners" in regards to Hoda, who she called "an unlikely revenge kidnapper", and thought that the story about him kidnapping Wyatt out of revenge was "far-fetched". TV Guide's Matt Roush gave the episode a positive review, saying it was "less sordid than the SVU norm" and that it benefited from "a tangible understanding of life in this city and how a community (and police department) can be haunted for years by a senseless crime."

Adam Buckman, writing for the Xfinity website, thought the opening scene "was almost too scary to watch, particularly if you live in New York and have first-hand experience with the chaos of crowded, tumultuous subway station platforms." Buckman said Wyatt's kidnap and David's reaction gave him "goosebumps". Kristen Elizabeth from TV Equals enjoyed the flashbacks, believing that they gave the episode "a nostalgic quality it wouldn't have had otherwise". However, she wished the episode was more interesting, as it left her confused which "soured everything else". Elizabeth was glad that Lomatin was not the kidnapper, as she thought it would have been a cliche, and added that she had seen better interrogation scenes in previous episodes.

The Los Angeles Times's Ed Stockly chose "Manhattan Vigil" as one of his "TV Highlights," while Alison Willmore from IndieWire thought the episode was worth a look. Andrew Murfett from The Sydney Morning Herald named it "show of the week" when it was broadcast in Australia. A reporter for the Belfast Telegraph included the episode in their TV Choice feature and commented, "not many TV shows can claim they've reached a 300th episode, but Law & Order: SVU can claim that, in style, as a familiar situation arises."

== Chronology ==
The episode was revisited three years later in the season 17 episode "Depravity Standard", broadcast on November 18, 2015. The plot focuses on Lewis Hodda's trial and the return of psychiatrist George Huang (B. D. Wong), who has been called to testify for the defense.
