= Acceptable Loss (Law & Order: Special Victims Unit) =

- Law & Order: Special Victims Unit episode
- Detectives Tutuola (Ice-T) and Amaro (Danny Pino) with Lt. Eames (Kathryn Erbe), their weapons trained on their suspects.
- Episode no.: Season 14; Episode 4
- Directed by: Alex Chapple
- Written by: Ed Zuckerman
- Production code: 14004
- Original air date: October 17, 2012

Guest appearances
- Angela Sarafyan as Anna; Richard Kind as Dworkin; Doug E. Doug as Wiggins; Alon Moni Aboutboul as Lou; Joey Oglesby as Mikey; Karen Tsen Lee as Medical Examiner; Jamila Velazquez as Pilar Morenas; Derrick Baskin as Officer Gillette; Shezi Sardar as John; Jack Haley as Reynolds; Evgenia Radilova as Sofia; Kathryn Erbe as Lieutenant Alexandra Eames

Episode chronology
← Previous "Twenty-Five Acts"	Next → "Manhattan Vigil"
- Law & Order: Special Victims Unit season 14

"Acceptable Loss" is the fourth episode of the fourteenth season of the police procedural television series, Law & Order: Special Victims Unit, it is the series' 299th episode overall. It originally aired on NBC on October 17, 2012. In this episode, Captain Cragen (Dann Florek) comes back from his suspension just as the Special Victims Unit is being stopped by Lieutenant Eames (Kathryn Erbe) for uncovering a sex trafficking operation, leaving Detective Benson (Mariska Hargitay) to figure out another way to free the enslaved women.

The episode was written by veteran Law & Order franchise writer, Ed Zuckerman and directed by franchise director Alex Chapple. It marks the first crossover of any kind with SVU and the now-ended L&O spin-off Law & Order: Criminal Intent. Kathryn Erbe reprises her role of Alexandra Eames from that series.

"Acceptable Loss" received generally positive reviews, with critics mostly commenting on Ice-T's performance throughout the episode. According to Nielsen ratings, the episode's original broadcast was watched by 6.25 million viewers and acquired a 1.6/4% share in the 18–49 demographic. It ranked fourth in its time slot, but was the highest-rated NBC program that evening.

== Plot ==
With Captain Cragen (Dann Florek) back in the precinct, the Special Victims Unit is in full force and working to expose a sex trafficking operation that tags and enslaves young women. The captain puts Detective Tutuola (Ice-T) undercover to find out who is behind the brutal crime, Amaro (Danny Pino) is irate at the captain's decision.

Fin, undercover as Harold, picks up one of the girls, Anna (Angela Sarafyan), hoping she'd tell him more about who they work for. She comes back raped and Fin offers to drop her off back at home, where Lou (Alon Moni Aboutboul) is upset at how she got an expensive dress ripped during her rape, Lou's son Mikey (Joey Oglesby) saying she could "work it off". Tutuola and Amaro go to Cragen to get a warrant to bust them, but Cragen comes to the scene with Lieutenant Alexandra Eames (Kathryn Erbe) who transferred out of the Major Case Squad and is on loan to a joint City/Federal Homeland Security Task Force, Eames taking the SVU off the case, citing they had stumbled upon a terrorism case.

Eames tells the SVU detectives she understands their frustration, but Eames explains the Pappases came into the country with fake visas, as well as their victim Pilar (Jamila Velazquez), and they had accomplices who have yet to be seen. Liv asks Eames how she could stand by and let this go, Eames reminding Olivia about 9/11. The SVU detectives figure out a way to keep tabs on them without Eames knowing, Cragen uncomfortably authorizes what the detectives want, if they keep him in the loop.

The detectives hatch one plan, but it goes south, Fin suggests they go back to Anna, but using Amaro instead. Anna initially refuses to help them, but the detectives promise they'd keep her safe and that Lou and Mikey were going down; Anna tells them at the SVU squad she was answering a nanny ad and that there were nine others. Eames comes down to the squad to tell them their terrorist is in the country and heard of SVU's operation, Eames saying she was going to have to explain it to her bosses and theirs, Cragen told the detectives to go after them anyway, not caring if they fire him.

The SVU learns that Sophia's name wasn't on the Pappases books, learning Sophia could be the terrorist. Eames and Benson go to Lou for answers, learning Sophia came with them on a lie. Liv begs Eames to let them go after Sophia so Lou doesn't get off. Eames and the SVU detectives bust Sophia and her friend before they detonate a bomb. Eames and Liv talk to Sophia at Federal Plaza, Sophia telling them her father was a doctor who was killed by a drone. Later over drinks, Benson and Eames discuss the case, Eames saying she learned how to get people to talk from her partner.

== Production ==
"Acceptable Loss" was written by veteran Law & Order franchise writer, Ed Zuckerman and directed by franchise director Alex Chapple.

On August 14, 2012, it was announced that Kathryn Erbe would be guest starring in at least two episodes of Law & Order: Special Victims Unit as her Law & Order: Criminal Intent character, Alexandra Eames, who has transferred out of the Major Case Squad and over to a joint City/Federal Homeland Security Task Force. Executive producer/show runner Warren Leight (who was producer, then co-executive producer, and later show runner/EP on LOCI from seasons two to seven) says he was struck by the characters' similarities. "These are two women who had long-term partnerships with difficult guys," Leight says. "These are two people who've been underestimated — who've worked just as hard, just as long —and people don't quite get how good they are."

== Reception ==
=== Critical response ===
Kristen Elizabeth of TV Equals reviewed portions of the episode positively, "The case itself was barely interesting. The terrorist that Eames was hunting down turned out to be hiding amongst the sex slaves; Eames had to use a few moves she picked up from Goren to coax the girl to explain that she wanted to make America pay for the death of her father, a doctor who was killed while rendering aid during an airstrike. As if we didn't already know that war sucks. It's always fun to see Fin go undercover, though. It rarely works out for him, so I was surprised that he wasn't made for a cop right away. In the end, both the traffickers and the terrorists were taken down and the women they exploited were set free. Everybody wins this time. Except the civilians being killed in the Middle East every day. But they don't count... right?"

On The Huffington Post, novelist and former sex crimes prosecutor Allison Leotta said of the episode, ""Acceptable Loss" was an intense episode, lightened by Ice-T's one-liners and Cragen's self-deprecating orange-jumpsuit jokes." Leotta noted the episode was correct in its subject matter regarding sex slavery/trafficking in the U.S. along with the radicalization of female terrorists abroad, but Leotta felt the medical plots were off and that in real life a Special Victims Unit would not have much involvement in this type of case. Leotta also gave the episode a "B+".

Viewers from the Islamic community, including Michael Muhammad Knight were disappointed at the episode's uniform depiction of Muslim practices, especially Sofia being stereotyped as a virgin. Knight wrote "the assumption here is that if this woman is not really a sex slave but a Muslim radical in disguise, there are no possible circumstances by which she might have had sex with someone." They considered the remark about Sofia's tattoo unrealistic in view of the variety of opinions in different Muslim sects and commented that tattoos have found popularity even among some al-Qaeda members.

=== Ratings ===
In its original American broadcast on October 17, 2012, "Acceptable Loss" was viewed by 6.25 million viewers and acquired a 1.6 rating/4% share in the age 18–49 demographic. "Acceptable Loss" was the most watched program on NBC that night, beating new episodes of its lead-ins Guys With Kids, and Animal Practice (which had been canceled by NBC earlier that day), the SVU episode also beat out its following program, another Dick Wolf created series, Chicago Fire. "Acceptable Loss" was the fourth ranked program in that timeslot, under FOX's The X Factor, Criminal Minds on CBS, and Modern Family on ABC, but above CW's Supernatural.
