= John Munch =

Fictional character of multiple U.S. television shows

- Homicide: Life on the Street and Law & Order: Special Victims Unit character
- First appearance: "Gone for Goode" (HLOTS) 1993; "Payback" (SVU) 1999
- Last appearance: "Forgive Us Our Trespasses" (HLOTS) 1999; "Fashionable Crimes" (SVU) 2016
- Created by: Paul Attanasio
- Portrayed by: Richard Belzer; Joseph Perrino (teen)
- Other appearances: Law & Order; The X-Files; The Beat; Law & Order: Trial by Jury; The Wire; Arrested Development

In-universe information
- Nicknames: Johnny (in childhood); Munchkin (as Baltimore detective)
- Gender: Male
- Titles: Homicide Detective (HLOTS); Special Victims Unit Detective (SVU seasons 1–8); Special Victims Unit Sergeant (SVU seasons 9–15); Cold Case Sergeant (SVU season 14); DA Investigator (SVU season 15–c. 20s)
- Occupation: BPD Detective (HLOTS); NYPD Detective (SVU); NYPD Sergeant (SVU)
- Family: Pete Munch (father); Bernard Munch (brother); David Munch (brother); Andrew Munch (uncle)
- Spouses: Gwen Munch (divorced); Billie Lou Hatfield (divorced); Felicia Munch (divorced); Nancy Munch (divorced); Unnamed wife
- Relatives: Andrew Munch (uncle); Lee Munch (cousin)
- Religion: Judaism

John Munch is a fictional character played by actor Richard Belzer. Munch first appeared on the American crime drama television series Homicide: Life on the Street on NBC. A regular through the entire run of the series from 1993 to 1999, Munch is a cynical detective in the Baltimore Police Department's Homicide unit, and a firm believer in conspiracy theories. He is originally partnered with Detective Stanley Bolander (Ned Beatty). Munch is based on Jay Landsman, a central figure in David Simon's 1991 true crime book Homicide: A Year on the Killing Streets.

Upon the cancellation of Homicide in 1999, Belzer was offered a regular role as Munch on the Law & Order spin-off titled Special Victims Unit. He appeared in the first 15 seasons of that series from 1999 to 2014, and occasionally as a guest thereafter. On SVU, Munch becomes a senior detective in the New York Police Department's Special Victims Unit, and is first partnered with Brian Cassidy (Dean Winters), followed by Monique Jeffries (Michelle Hurd), and Fin Tutuola (Ice-T).

In the ninth season premiere, Munch is promoted to the rank of sergeant and occasionally takes on supervisory functions within the department. In season 14, Munch is temporarily reassigned to the Cold Case Unit, after solving a decade-old child abduction case in the episode "Manhattan Vigil". He returns to the squad in "Secrets Exhumed", in which he brings back a 1980s rape-homicide cold case for the squad to investigate.

In the season 15 episode "Wonderland Story", SVU Captain Donald Cragen (Dann Florek) and the squad throw Munch a retirement party, where past and present colleagues and family members celebrate his career. At the conclusion of the episode, Munch returns to the precinct to gather his belongings, where he and Cragen shake hands as Cragen remarks, "You had one hell of a run, Sergeant Munch." Munch returned, post-retirement, to help his colleagues in the fifteenth-season finale "Spring Awakening" and the seventeenth-season episode "Fashionable Crimes".

The character of Munch has appeared in ten series on five networks since the character's debut in 1993. Apart from Homicide and SVU, Belzer's performances as Munch were guest appearances or crossovers rather than regular or recurring appearances. With Munch's retirement in the character's 22nd season on television, he was a regular character on American television longer than Marshal Matt Dillon (Gunsmoke) and Frasier Crane (Cheers and Frasier), both of whom were on television for 20 seasons; he is only behind Mariska Hargitay's character Olivia Benson and Ice-T's Fin Tutuola. Munch's return to help his friends in the SVU seventeenth-season episode "Fashionable Crimes" marks the 23rd season that the character has appeared on television in any capacity.

== Character progression ==
Munch first appeared as a central character in the TV series Homicide: Life on the Street, as a homicide detective in the Baltimore Police Department's fictionalized homicide unit, which debuted January 31, 1993. The character was primarily based on Jay Landsman, a central figure in David Simon's 1991 true crime book Homicide: A Year on the Killing Streets, a documentary account of the homicide unit's operation over one year. However, Munch's storyline also touched on the book's depiction of the relationship between real-life detectives Donald Worden and David Brown, in which Worden was relentless in his tutelage/hazing of the younger detective but also genuinely wanted him to succeed and was impressed when the younger cop did excellent work. A storyline in the book involving Brown's cracking a very difficult hit-and-run homicide was included almost verbatim in the show's pilot.

Barry Levinson, co-creator and executive producer of Homicide, said Belzer was a "lousy actor" during his audition when he first read lines from the script for "Gone for Goode", the first episode in the series. Levinson asked Belzer to take some time to reread and practice the material, then come back and read it again. During his second reading, Levinson said Belzer was "still terrible", but that the actor eventually found confidence in his performance.

Munch appeared as a regular character in every season, and in almost every episode, of Homicide. After Homicide: Life on the Street concluded its seventh season in May 1999, the character transferred into the Law & Order universe as a regular character on Law & Order: Special Victims Unit (both Homicide and the original Law & Order had crossed-over numerous times before, and Munch had featured centrally in each crossover). It is explained that Munch had retired from the Baltimore Police Department, taken his pension as a Maryland state employee, and moved to New York to join a sex crimes investigation unit, where he was eventually given a promotion to sergeant.

Munch joined the BPD's homicide unit in 1983. During the fourth-season premiere of Homicide: Life on the Street, he signs up to take a promotion exam in hopes of becoming a sergeant, but a "comedy of errors" prevents him from showing up for it. In the first episode of the ninth season of Law & Order: Special Victims Unit, it is revealed that he passed the NYPD sergeant's exam, having taken it on a bar bet, and earned his promotion. He is temporarily promoted to commanding officer of the Special Victims Unit following Cragen's temporary reassignment, but is depicted as happily relinquishing control back to him, commenting upon Cragen's return, "This job sucks." He kept his rank, however, as he is still referred to as Sergeant in later episodes. He is temporarily put in charge again when Cragen is suspended after the detectives mishandle a case.

Munch makes a cameo appearance on a fifth-season episode of The Wire. Munch can be seen at Kavanaugh's Bar arguing with the bartender over his tab by referencing his experience running a bar (he opened The Waterfront Bar in Homicide). He appears in "Unusual Suspects", the third episode of the fifth season of The X-Files—the episode is set in 1989, when Munch was still at the Baltimore Police Department.

== Character biography ==
=== Early life and background ===
John Munch was born around 1951, though some references in Homicide suggest a birth year of 1944 (the same year as Belzer). Munch explains growing up in either Pikesville, Maryland, or on the Lower East Side of New York City, depending on the series. He mentions that his childhood was troubled due to an abusive father who had bipolar disorder and ultimately died by suicide, leaving Munch with lasting guilt. He had two brothers, Bernie and David, and a paternal uncle named Andrew, who suffered from depressive pseudodementia. Munch also worked with his grandfather in the garment industry and was involved in anti-Vietnam War protests during the late 1960s and early 1970s.

=== Career in law enforcement ===
Munch joined the Baltimore Police Department's Homicide Unit in 1983. He was partnered with Stanley Bolander, with whom he shared a deep but often combative friendship. Despite his intelligence and skill, Munch missed an opportunity for early promotion due to various misfortunes. He co-owned "The Waterfront," a bar near the precinct, a venture that he would later reference after moving to New York.

Following the conclusion of Homicide: Life on the Street, Munch retired from the Baltimore Police Department and took his pension as a Maryland state employee. He then moved to New York City, where he joined the NYPD’s Special Victims Unit. Initially partnered with Brian Cassidy, then briefly with Monique Jeffries, he ultimately formed a strong professional bond with Fin Tutuola. Their relationship, initially rocky, developed into one of mutual respect and camaraderie, demonstrated when Munch was shot and Fin stayed by his side. Throughout his time in SVU, Munch frequently referenced his past as a bar owner and even considered purchasing another bar in New York despite the late-2000s recession. Over time, Munch passed the sergeant’s exam on a bet and was promoted, serving as acting commander when needed.

=== Retirement and legacy ===
After years of dedicated service, Munch retired from SVU in season 15. The squad honored him with a farewell party, and he transitioned into a role as a special investigator for the district attorney’s office. However, he remained connected to his former colleagues, occasionally returning to assist with investigations and even bailing out Detective Nick Amaro. Before fully stepping away, he helped SVU solve a final case and looked after Olivia Benson’s adopted son, Noah.

Munch later married for a fifth time, this time to a rabbi, and moved back to Baltimore, where he resumed ownership of The Waterfront. In the 25th season premiere, it is revealed that Munch has died. His former colleagues, Fin Tutuola and Olivia Benson, make a heartfelt toast in his memory.

=== List of assignments ===
- Detective, Baltimore PD Homicide (1983–May 5, 1995)
- Senior Detective, Baltimore PD Homicide (October 20, 1995 – May 21, 1999)
- Senior Detective, NYPD 16th Precinct (Special Victims Unit) (September 20, 1999 – May 22, 2007)
- Sergeant–Detective Squad, NYPD 16th Precinct (Special Victims Unit) (September 25, 2007 – October 16, 2013)
- Special Investigator, New York County District Attorney's Office (October 16, 2013 – c. 2020)

==== Temporary assignments ====
- Acting commanding officer, NYPD 16th Precinct (Special Victims Unit) (September 25, 2007)
- Acting commanding officer, NYPD 16th Precinct (Special Victims Unit) (November 11, 2009)
- Sergeant–Detective Squad, NYPD Cold Case Squad (October 31, 2012 – February 13, 2013)

=== Ranks ===
- Officer
- Detective (Baltimore PD)
- Detective 1st Grade (NYPD)
- Sergeant
- District Attorney Special Investigator (New York County DA)

=== Partners ===
Homicide: Life on the Street:

- Detective Stanley Bolander (Ned Beatty) (January 31, 1993 – May 5, 1995)
- Detective Megan Russert (Isabella Hofmann) (January 5, 1996 – May 17, 1996)
- Detective Mike Kellerman (Reed Diamond)
- Detective Tim Bayliss (Kyle Secor)

Law & Order: SVU:

- Detective 3rd Grade Ken Briscoe (Chris Orbach)
- Detective 3rd Grade Brian Cassidy (Dean Winters) (September 20, 1999 – February 4, 2000)
- Detective 3rd Grade Monique Jeffries (Michelle Hurd) (February 11, 2000 – October 20, 2000)
- Detective 2nd/1st Grade Odafin "Fin" Tutuola (Ice-T) (October 20, 2000 – May 22, 2007)

== Characteristics ==
Munch is Jewish but said the only thing he and Judaism had in common was that he "didn't like to work on Saturdays." He indicates that he is familiar with Jewish prayers, and eventually says Kaddish at the end of an episode of Homicide of the same name in memory of a Jewish murder victim. He is familiar with common Yiddish words and phrases. Munch interacts with an Orthodox Jewish witness, using one Yiddish word, farshteyn ("understand"), and referring to the twelve Israelite tribes from the Bible. The man remarks that Munch must be Jewish and consequently agrees to help him out of a fraternal connection. After the interaction, Munch reciprocates by offering the man a ride back to the Riverdale neighborhood in The Bronx. He identifies his ethnic background as Romanian.

He has a younger brother named Bernie who owns a funeral parlor; he once joked that he occasionally "throws him some business". He mentioned another brother who is in the drywall business. His brother David attended his farewell roast. His cousin Lee acts as his accountant—and the accountant for The Waterfront—when he lives in Baltimore.

Munch has been described as a stubborn man who distrusts all women, all forms of government and authority, and "can smell a conspiracy at a five-year-old's lemonade stand". Munch can often be seen lecturing his co-workers on a variety of conspiracy theories, which he views as obvious truths. In the SVU pilot episode, he rants about a supposed government cover-up in the assassination of John F. Kennedy. However, Munch does not seem to believe all conspiracy theories; in The X-Files episode "Unusual Suspects"—a cross-over episode with Homicide—Munch dismisses the Lone Gunmen's claims of a government plot to expose Baltimore residents to a hallucinogenic gas.

At the onset of Homicide, he had been divorced twice and was dating a woman named Felicia. By the seventh season, he had a total of three ex-wives until marrying Waterfront bartender Billie Lou Hatfield (Ellen McElduff). Before leaving Baltimore, Munch had divorced Billie Lou after discovering she had been having an affair with a member of his own precinct after less than one day of marriage. In the season 1 finale of SVU, a police psychiatrist notes that despite his cynicism regarding relationships, Munch still believes in true love and is devastated by the fact he has not yet found it.

He once stated that he and his first wife Gwen had sex once after their divorce. Her first on-screen appearance is the Homicide episode "All Is Bright", in which she is played by Carol Kane. Gwen shows up at The Waterfront to inform Munch her mother has died. As the two catch up, he agrees to arrange for the funeral of Gwen's mother despite the fact his ex-mother-in-law loathed him and did everything in her power to disrupt her daughter's marriage to him. Near the end of the episode, Munch performs a touching toast to his former mother-in-law in one of the few times his cynical façade slips. Kane next returns as Gwen in "Zebras", the season 10 finale of SVU, and is portrayed as suffering from paranoid schizophrenia. While working with Lennie Briscoe (Jerry Orbach) in the season four episode of Homicide, "For God and Country", a crossover with Law & Order, Munch loses badly to Briscoe in a pool game and learns Briscoe had briefly dated and slept with Gwen. Distraught, he gets drunk and proclaims that he forgives Gwen and still loves her. Despite this, he and Briscoe become quite good friends—their interaction in the two following crossovers between Homicide and Law & Order, as well as in a crossover between Law & Order and SVU, is generally friendly (Belzer originally pitched to Dick Wolf that Munch join Law & Order as Briscoe's new partner, but the role had already been filled by Ed Green, played by Jesse L. Martin).

While Munch could never be accused of being sentimental, his cynical façade has occasionally slipped, revealing a deep compassion for children born from his unhappy childhood. When Munch emerges unscathed from an ambush shooting during a third-season episode of Homicide that leaves three of his colleagues hospitalized, he tries to laugh it off but breaks down in tears. In the second season of SVU, after solving a case dealing with an abusive mother who put her daughter in a coma, Munch tells Benson that when he was in high school, one of his neighbors killed her daughter and for years afterward he felt guilty for failing to recognize the girl needed help.

Munch is a staunch believer in individual rights and occasionally finds that something he has to do in the line of duty goes against his sense of morality. A particularly disturbing experience for him was having to see patients on dialysis have their kidney transplants denied.

In a third-season episode of Homicide, Munch is suspected by Detective Tim Bayliss of having murdered Gordon Pratt (Steve Buscemi), the suspect in the shooting of three homicide detectives, including Munch's partner Stanley Bolander. Munch had motive, opportunity, an unconfirmed alibi, and never actually denies killing Pratt, but Bayliss refuses to question Munch further or test his service weapon to determine if it has been fired recently. He closes the case, informing his shift commander there was insufficient evidence to charge anyone.

Munch is fluent in French. He also has some conversational ability in Russian, Hebrew, Yiddish, Spanish, Greek, and Hungarian.

== Diminished role ==
A 2007 news item noted the character of Munch "has slowly disappeared from [SVU's] plotlines", and quotes Belzer as saying "[i]t's mystifying to me", admitting his feelings to be "slightly hurt". Following season nine, in which Munch appeared in just over half of the episodes, Belzer reiterated his mystification at the development but also seemed to want to tone it down: "It's like yanking the tonsils out of the gift horse if I complain too much. I've been lucky over the years...c'est la vie, I'm not starving."

== Continuity ==
Although Homicide: Life on the Street and Law & Order: SVU officially share the same continuity, they provide conflicting accounts of Munch's childhood and SVU rarely mentions Munch's past as a Baltimore homicide detective. Four regular actors from Homicide (Peter Gerety, Callie Thorne, Michael Michele, Andre Braugher) and two recurring ones (Clayton LeBouef, Željko Ivanek), whose characters regularly interacted with Munch on that series have appeared as different, unrelated characters on SVU, sometimes sharing scenes with Munch. In Braugher's first appearance on SVU as Attorney Bayard Ellis, there is an implicit nod towards the shared continuity between the shows when Munch greets Braugher's character as if he knows him. "There's a glimmer of [recognition]," as Braugher described the meeting.

There were three specific examples of consistent continuity between the two shows, all related to Munch's personal life. One is Munch's amicable divorce from Gwen, who has appeared in episodes of both Homicide and SVU. Homicide: The Movie features Munch's temporary return to assist the Baltimore Homicide Unit when his friend and former boss – BPD Lieutenant Al Giardello – has been shot, with dialogue acknowledging that Munch is currently assigned to Manhattan's Special Victims Unit. The two shows come together for Munch's retirement when his SVU party is attended by Homicide BPD Detective Meldrick Lewis (Clark Johnson) and his first and fourth ex-wives, Gwen and Billie Lou, who were both introduced as characters on Homicide.

== Credits ==
From 1993 to 1997, Belzer has been credited as portraying Detective John Munch in all 122 episodes of Homicide: Life on the Street (appearing in 119 episodes), as well as the 2000 follow up television film Homicide: The Movie.

Belzer continued to portray Munch on Law & Order: Special Victims Unit from 1999 to 2016, being credited in 325 episodes (appearing in 242 episodes).

Additionally, within the larger Law & Order franchise, Belzer has been credited for appearing as Munch in five other episodes—four episodes in the original Law & Order series, appearances spanning from 1996 to 2000, and one episode of the short-lived spinoff series, Law & Order: Trial by Jury in 2005.

Homicide: Life on the Street appearances
Season	Years	Episodes																						
Season	Years	1	2	3	4	5	6	7	8	9	10	11	12	13	14	15	16	17	18	19	20	21	22	23
1	1993																							
2	1994																							
3	1994–95																							
4	1995–96																			×				
5	1996–97																							
6	1997-98				×																			
7	1998–99																			×				
Homicide: The Movie	2000																							
Seasons	Years	1	2	3	4	5	6	7	8	9	10	11	12	13	14	15	16	17	18	19	20	21	22	23
Seasons	Years	Episodes																						

Law & Order appearances
Season	Years	Episodes																							
Season	Years	1	2	3	4	5	6	7	8	9	10	11	12	13	14	15	16	17	18	19	20	21	22	23	24
6	1996																								
8	1997																								
9	1999																								
10	2000																								
Seasons	Years	1	2	3	4	5	6	7	8	9	10	11	12	13	14	15	16	17	18	19	20	21	22	23	24
Seasons	Years	Episodes																							

Law & Order: Special Victims Unit appearances
Season	Years	Episodes																								
Season	Years	1	2	3	4	5	6	7	8	9	10	11	12	13	14	15	16	17	18	19	20	21	22	23	24	25
1	1999–2000																									
2	2000–2001																				×					
3	2001–2002																			×		×				
4	2002–2003													×												
5	2003–2004																	×				×				
6	2004–2005		×					×													×					
7	2005–2006	×																×				×				
8	2006–2007											×				×	×			×						
9	2007–2008		×	×			×		×	×		×	×													
10	2008–2009			×				×	×		×		×	×						×						
11	2009–2010	×	×			×						×	×	×	×			×	×			×			×	
12	2010–2011			×	×		×	×				×		×	×		×	×	×	×	×	×	×		×	
13	2011–2012		×			×		×			×	×	×		×				×				×	×		
14	2012–2013				×		×	×	×	×	×	×	×	×		×			×	×	×		×	×	×	
15	2013–2014		×		×																					
17	2015–2016																									
Seasons	Years	1	2	3	4	5	6	7	8	9	10	11	12	13	14	15	16	17	18	19	20	21	22	23	24	25
Seasons	Years	Episodes																								

Law & Order: Trial by Jury appearances
Season	Years	Episodes												
Season	Years	1	2	3	4	5	6	7	8	9	10	11	12	13
1	2005													
Seasons	Years	1	2	3	4	5	6	7	8	9	10	11	12	13
Seasons	Years	Episodes												

Regular cast

×	Regular cast + no appearance

Recurring cast

Guest cast

No credit + no appearance

No episode

== Other appearances ==
The character has spanned over 20 years and 23 seasons of network television. Along with his main cast roles on Homicide and SVU, Munch, or Belzer portraying a parody of the role, has also appeared as a character in other TV series, movies, talk shows, albums and comic books:

- Homicide: Life on the Street—119 out of 122 episodes in the series
- Law & Order: Special Victims Unit—242 out of 325 episodes in the series
- Homicide: The Movie—television movie
- Law & Order—four episodes: "Charm City", "Baby, It's You" (part 1), "Sideshow (Part 1)", and "Entitled (Part 2)"
- Arrested Development—one episode: "Exit Strategy"
- The X-Files—one episode: "Unusual Suspects"
- The Beat—one episode: "They Say It's Your Birthday"
- Law & Order: Trial by Jury—one episode: "Skeleton (Part 2)"
- The Wire—one episode: "Took." Munch is briefly seen towards the end of the episode, talking to a bartender about not pressing a regular for their entire bar tab. He references his own experience running a bar, as Augustus Haynes (played by Clark Johnson, who played Detective Meldrick Lewis on Homicide) walks by him. Haynes engages in conversation with Major Dennis Mellow, played by the real Jay Landsman, whom the character of John Munch is partially based on.

=== Cameos and parodies ===
- American Dad—one episode: "Next of Pin", Detective Munch shows up at the end of the episode to recruit Steve to join him as a detective after being impressed by Steve's detective work at the bowling alley.
- 30 Rock—two episodes: "¡Qué Sorpresa!", the characters are watching an SVU episode, with dialogue written and action shot specifically for 30 Rock. Richard Belzer also appears as the actor playing Munch in "Last Lunch", part one of 30 Rock's series finale, when Jenna Maroney (Jane Krakowski) lands a guest role on SVU as a corpse.
- Jimmy Kimmel Live!—one episode: October 7, 2009. Richard Belzer was interviewed as himself, then does an impromptu scene as Munch with Kimmel and Joel McHale.
- Unbreakable Kimmy Schmidt—one episode: "Kimmy Goes to the Doctor!", the characters are watching a fictional Law & Order spinoff episode on their television.
- A Muppet version of Munch appeared in the Sesame Street sketch "Law & Order: Special Letters Unit" where he was portrayed by David Rudman.
- Munch makes a cameo appearance on the 1993 Paul Shaffer album The World's Most Dangerous Party.
- An unseen Munch is mentioned, by Detective Chief Inspector John Luther, as an NYPD SVU contact on episode 5 of the UK crime drama Luther. DCI Luther is played by Idris Elba, who played Stringer Bell in the HBO drama The Wire, where Munch previously cameoed.
- The 1996 film A Very Brady Sequel

Munch has become the only fictional character, played by a single actor, to physically appear on 10 different television series. These shows were on five different networks: NBC (Homicide: Life on the Street, Law & Order, Law & Order: Special Victims Unit, Law & Order: Trial by Jury, and 30 Rock), Fox (The X-Files and Arrested Development), UPN (The Beat), HBO (The Wire) and ABC (Jimmy Kimmel Live!).

== See also ==
- Fictional crossover
- Tommy Westphall
