= Donald Cragen =

Fictional character on Law & Order franchise

Capt. Donald Cragen
- Law & Order character
- First appearance: "Prescription for Death" (L&O) "Payback" (SVU)
- Last appearance: "Fixed" (L&O) "In the Wind" (SVU)
- Portrayed by: Dann Florek

In-universe information
- Title: NYPD Captain
- Family: A sister
- Spouse: Marge Cragen (deceased)
- Children: Son and daughter (later retconned)
- Relatives: A nephew
- Partner: Max Greevey
- Seasons: L&O: 1, 2, 3, 5, 10, 15; SVU: 1, 2, 3, 4, 5, 6, 7, 8, 9, 10, 11, 12, 13, 14, 15, 16, 23, 27; OC: 2, 4

Donald 'Don' Cragen is a fictional character played by Dann Florek in the American police procedural television series Law & Order and its spin-off, Law & Order: Special Victims Unit, on NBC. Cragen is a homicide captain with the New York City Police Department who later becomes captain of the department's Special Victims Unit. A recovering alcoholic, Cragen is a tough police veteran who is loyal to his officers. He appeared in the first three seasons of Law & Order and in the first 15 seasons of Law & Order: Special Victims Unit. Having credited appearances in 400 episodes in the Law & Order franchise, Cragen has appeared in the third-most episodes of any character in the franchise; this mark is surpassed only by Olivia Benson and Fin Tutuola, main characters on Law & Order: Special Victims Unit. Cragan retires from the police force in 2014, though he occasionally provides help to some of his old Special Victims Unit colleagues. The premiere episode of the show's 27th season reveals that Cragen dies in 2025.

== Background ==
Cragen was born in 1950 and comes from an Irish Catholic background, and graduated from a Catholic university in New York City, although different episodes have given conflicting information about exactly which school; he calls St. Raymond's University his alma mater in the first season episode "Sophomore Jinx", but says it is St. John's in the third season episode "Justice". Cragen served as a Green Beret in the U.S. Army Special Forces in the Vietnam War before joining the New York Police Department, where he was a homicide detective partnered with Max Greevey (George Dzundza). Cragen had been married to a flight attendant named Marge (Ellen Tobie) and they had two children together, though a retroactive continuity error cancelled the children from existence ("likes his snacks, attends AA, is childless...") in episodes of Special Victims Unit.

The episode "Prescription for Death" establishes that Cragen is a recovering alcoholic. He says that his drinking problem had become so severe in his early career that Greevey insisted he would no longer partner with him unless he joined Alcoholics Anonymous. Cragen finally hit rock bottom when he pulled his service revolver on a taxi driver while in a drunken rage; horrified, he quit drinking, joined AA, and has been sober ever since. Nevertheless, he admits that he feels a daily temptation to drink due to the horrors he witnesses in his job.

In an episode set in early 2001, Cragen says he has been a captain for 12 years, meaning he was promoted just before the start of the regular L&O continuity. Cragen's long time stuck at the same rank (for the last 25 years of his career) is due to multiple political factors blocking his discretionary promotion to the deputy inspector rank. However, his skills as a manager of detectives and his long tenure as a captain have earned him the command of multiple prestigious units, including the Anti-Corruption Task Force and the Manhattan SVU.

While on Law & Order, Cragen was depicted as easily irritated when under stress; when answering the telephone, his customary greeting was, "What?!". By the time of Law & Order: Special Victims Unit, however, he has become more unflappable. He is jaded by city politics and no longer votes. He is a fan of the New York Mets, and keeps an autographed baseball in a case on his desk.

== Storyline ==
Florek portrayed the character from 1990 to 1993 in the original Law & Order. Six years later, he reprised his role again in Law & Order: Special Victims Unit from its premiere in 1999 to 2014.

=== In Law & Order ===
In the 1991 episode "The Blue Wall", Cragen is investigated by internal affairs for possible corruption after evidence tampering within the department leads to the acquittal of three Wall Street bankers in a money laundering case. As Greevey and detective Mike Logan (Chris Noth) investigate the case in an attempt to clear Cragen’s name, they discover that Cragen's mentor Pete O'Farrell (Robert Lansing) accepted bribes and arranged the evidence tampering. Cragen is reluctant to cooperate in the investigation against O'Farrell, but when District Attorney Adam Schiff (Steven Hill) and EADA Ben Stone apply pressure by calling for his indictment, Cragen agrees to wear a wire during conversations with O'Farrell, ultimately leading to O'Farrell's arrest. Despite clearing his own name in the process, Cragen feels guilty for bringing down his former mentor and friend.

When Greevey is murdered in the episode "Confession", Cragen is a pall-bearer at his funeral.

The Cragen character was removed from the series after the third season, making his last appearance in the season finale episode "Benevolence". Although his departure is not immediately explained, it is established in the fifth season episode "Bad Faith" that he has transferred to head of the Anti-Corruption Task Force. He is succeeded in the homicide precinct by Lieutenant Anita Van Buren (S. Epatha Merkerson).

=== Outside Law & Order ===
After leaving the 27th Precinct, Cragen spends six years as the head of the Anti-Corruption Task Force.

Cragen encounters Logan again in the 1995 episode "Bad Faith" during an Anti-Corruption Task Force investigation into crooked narcotics detectives. Logan is investigating the suspicious death of a childhood friend and fellow detective, Bill Marino, and is questioned by Cragen and task force detectives due to Marino's ties to the narcotics detectives. Logan's investigation into Marino's death leads to the arrest of Joseph Krolinsky (Bill Raymond), a former Catholic priest who had molested several boys, including Logan and Marino, and who had manipulated Marino into supplying him with victims. When Logan feels conflicted about whether to testify about his knowledge of Marino's complicity in those crimes, he turns to Cragen for advice. Cragen comforts Logan and ultimately helps convince him not to commit perjury by lying about Marino.

As portrayed in the 1998 TV movie Exiled: A Law & Order Movie, Cragen next interacts with the 27th Precinct while attempting to arrest Mafia boss Don Giancarlo Uzielli (Tony Musante) for the murders of 15 people. During that investigation, Cragen discovers that there is not only a cop in the 27th Precinct on Uzielli's payroll, but that Logan is interfering with the investigation of the don by investigating a murder of his own. With Logan's help, Cragen discovers the identity of the corrupt officer: his former detective, and trusted friend, Tony Profaci (John Fiore).

It is said in a Season 1 episode of SVU, that Cragen took control of the unit in 1995, but in the Exiled movie, he is still a part of the Anti-Corruption Task Force (via tape recording he shows Logan).

At some point before the events of Law & Order: Special Victims Unit, Cragen's wife Marge, a flight attendant, is killed in a plane crash. Florek said upon reprising the role on SVU that he and the show's producers crafted a back story in which Marge's death led Cragen to start drinking again, and that, in his loneliness, he solicited prostitutes. In that back story, Cragen becomes captain of the sex crimes unit to escape that downward spiral. Most of that story, however, is not explicitly discussed in any episodes of Law & Order: Special Victims Unit.

=== In SVU ===
In 1999, the character appeared in the spinoff Law & Order: Special Victims Unit, in which he heads a bureau dedicated to solving sex crimes. Several of Cragen's first episodes on the series reunite him with another one of his former detectives from the 27th Precinct, Lennie Briscoe (Jerry Orbach); one of these reunions involves re-opening a serial murder case that Briscoe and Logan had failed to solve six years earlier (as portrayed in the Law & Order episode "Mayhem").

In "Stalked", a first-season episode, Cragen participates in a sting operation in which one of his detectives, Olivia Benson (Mariska Hargitay), serves as bait for Richard White (Bruce Kirkpatrick), a serial rapist who had been stalking her. When White attempts to attack her, Cragen physically incapacitates him and allows for his arrest.

In a 2001 episode, Cragen finds a kidnapped boy he and Greevey had been assigned to find in 1991 while investigating a corrupt adoption agency. Cragen and his detectives later determined that the wife of the boy's biological father killed his mother and falsely gave the baby to the adoption agency, where he was given a home. In the end, the boy's biological father wins custody of him.

In the fifth season episode "Criminal", a homicide investigation leads to a suspect named Javier Vega (James McDaniel), a man Cragen arrested for murder in the 1970s who has since reformed and become a criminology professor. Convinced of Vega's guilt, Cragen becomes personally involved in the investigation, which results in Vega's arrest and conviction. When evidence surfaces proving Vega's innocence, a guilt-stricken Cragen arranges for his immediate release. Vega later kidnaps the actual killer and threatens him at gunpoint, but Cragen talks him down, then saves Vega when the killer grabs Vega's gun and tries to shoot him.

At the start of the ninth season, Cragen is briefly relieved of duty for failure to supervise due to the actions of several of his detectives, such as Detective Odafin Tutuola's (Ice-T) stepson, Darius Parker (Ludacris), committing three murders and being acquitted of them, Benson aiding her fugitive half-brother Simon Marsden (Michael Weston) and her partner, Detective Elliot Stabler (Christopher Meloni), covering up his daughter's DUI. Cragen is forced to transfer to the office of Chief of Detectives and cede control of his precinct to the newly promoted Sergeant John Munch (Richard Belzer). The transfer is short-lived, however, as Cragen's command is restored after Munch allows a suspect (Cynthia Nixon) faking dissociative identity disorder to be released into her sister's care, only for her to kill her parents. In season 11, he is again suspended for 10 days, and is told that any further trouble concerning his unit will cost him his job. In "Ace", he uses deadly force against a baby trafficker (Pasha D. Lychnikoff) who is about to kill a rape victim.

Throughout Season 13, Cragen takes a more personalized role in SVU cases. In the episode "Russian Brides", Cragen takes on an undercover assignment to lure out a killer of young mail order brides, posing as the head of a children's rights organization. During a conversation with his "date", he mentions that he and his late wife talked about adopting a child after she suffered a miscarriage but could not find the time to go through with it. It is left ambiguous whether Cragen is speaking of his own life, or merely improvising as part of his undercover role. The season 13 finale, "Rhodium Nights", closes with Cragen awakening in bed to find the body of a young female escort beside him, her throat cut, and his hands covered in blood. He is suspended while the NYPD's Internal Affairs Bureau investigates him for murder. In the Season 14 premiere, Bureau Chief ADA of the Public Integrity Unit, Paula Foster (Paget Brewster), investigates Cragen in the murder of the escort. He is arrested and held at Rikers Island. The SVU detectives work the case as well, trying to prove that he was framed. It is discovered that Cragen did hire a few escorts for "company". After it is proven that the girl was murdered by her pimp, Bart Ganzel (Peter Jacobson), Foster drops the murder charge, but announces that she is charging him with several other crimes, prompting Benson and the SVU detectives to dig into Foster's motives. Benson discovers that Foster is on the payroll of Wilson (an escort booker). The SVU detectives arrest Foster, which allows the charges against Cragen to be dropped.

In the Season 15 episode "Internal Affairs", Cragen remarks that he is approaching the mandatory retirement age, numbering the days he has left with SVU. In the following episode "Wonderland Story", he asks Benson to take the Sergeant's Exam after Munch retires from the position. Cragen officially announces his retirement in the episode "Amaro's One-Eighty". He explains that he is leaving to join his girlfriend, Eileen Switzer (Mel Harris), on a six-month cruise around the world, which would take him to his mandatory retirement date. He tells the squad room it was his privilege to work with each one of them, and announces that Benson would be taking over as their new interim supervisor.

In season 16, Cragen returns for the episode "Perverted Justice", in which he helps Sergeant Benson and Defense Attorney Bayard Ellis (Andre Braugher) look into a decades-old rape. Cragen uses his connections from the 27th precinct to help SVU get information they could never have accessed otherwise.

In season 23, he helps Benson, who has by now been promoted to his old job as captain of SVU, investigate a 25-year-old cold case that he had originally investigated, conferring with her via FaceTime. When Benson solves the case, he tells her how proud he is of her becoming captain.

Cragen appears in a second-season episode of Law & Order: Organized Crime, a spin-off centered on Stabler, who now works as an undercover detective in the NYPD's Organized Crime Unit. In the episode, "Can't Knock the Hustle", Stabler goes to Cragen for answers concerning rumors that his late father, Joe Stabler, who was also a police officer, was corrupt. Cragen replies that he does not know for certain whether the elder Stabler broke the law, but he does know that he was a good cop during a difficult time for New York City.

In the season 27 premiere "In the Wind", Cragen is revealed to have died of natural causes, with his wake being attended by many of his former colleagues.

== Awards and decorations ==
The following are the medals and service awards worn by Captain Cragen.

American Flag Breast Bar
NYPD Medal of Honor
NYPD Combat Cross with gold award star (2nd award)
NYPD Meritorious Police Duty
NYPD Excellent Police Duty

== Development ==
=== Creation and casting ===
Dann Florek was first cast as Donald Cragen in "Everybody's Favorite Bagman", the pilot episode of what would later become Law & Order. The pilot was filmed and produced in 1988, and it would take two more years before NBC ordered the full series. While main cast members Noth, Dzundza, Michael Moriarty and Richard Brooks had each signed option contracts that allowed them to be hired for the full series, Florek had signed no such contract. However, since he did not have any other acting roles at the time that the show went into production, he was available to join the show's cast. Florek was living in Venice, Los Angeles at the time he was cast and had to be flown into New York City for the filming of each episode.

Florek said during the formative seasons of Law & Order, the cast and crew had a great deal of integrity and were dedicated to making something different, and that filming could be unpredictable as a result. However, Florek was frustrated with his lack of scenes, claiming he felt the character was not well developed and under-appreciated, and he disliked commuting so far for such little material. He also believed the producers and crew were not giving him enough direction and guidance in forming the character, pointing out that he did not learn Cragen was an alcoholic until several weeks into filming. As a result, Florek came up with much of the character by himself and improvised many personality traits and characteristics as he went.

Florek repeatedly tried to quit the role during the first season, claiming that he was not given enough screen time. Series creator Dick Wolf persuaded him to stay, particularly due to concerns about the stability of the cast after Dzundza left the series and was replaced by Paul Sorvino as Sergeant Phil Cerreta.

=== Departure from Law & Order ===
Those were the worst two phone calls I've ever had to make in 20 years as a producer. 'Dann,' I said, 'Look, you were the bedrock of the cast, you never complained, you show up on time every day of work, you have never been a pain in the ass and thank you. You're fired.'

— Dick Wolf, about Florek's firing

Florek was ultimately terminated from the series after the third season upon orders from Don Ohlmeyer, NBC's West Coast president, to add more female cast members to the show. Wolf objected to the decision but agreed to it in the face of possible cancellation if he did not. He was one of two actors dismissed from the series along with Richard Brooks, who played Assistant District Attorney Paul Robinette. Wolf described notifying Florek and Brooks about the decisions as "literally the two worst phone calls I ever had to make in a business context". Florek said he did not approve of the "hushed and hidden" way his firing was handled.

After Florek's departure from the show, Wolf stayed in touch with the actor and often said he wished to work with him again. Their continued correspondence led to Florek directing several episodes of Law & Order, as well as Florek reprising his role as Cragen in Exiled: A Law & Order Movie. When Wolf invited him to join the permanent cast of Law & Order: Special Victims Unit, the television comedy series The Secret Diary of Desmond Pfeiffer, in which Florek played Abraham Lincoln, had just been cancelled. Florek had originally expected to star in another comedy, but production was delayed, freeing the actor's schedule up. Florek had reservations about accepting the role because, he said, "I didn't want to wind up doing the same thing; the crusty yet benign captain." He ultimately agreed to join the cast, in part because Ohlmeyer no longer worked for NBC. In accepting the role, Florek asked for more freedom in shaping the direction of the character. He said, "I wanted him to have grown and changed, and to be much more actively involved."

== Appearances and credits ==
Law & Order: Special Victims Unit appearances
Season	Years	Episodes																								
Season	Years	1	2	3	4	5	6	7	8	9	10	11	12	13	14	15	16	17	18	19	20	21	22	23	24	25
1	1999–2000																									
2	2000–01																									
3	2001–02																									
4	2002–03																									
5	2003–04																									
6	2004–05																									
7	2005–06																									
8	2006–07																									
9	2007–08																									
10	2008–09																									
11	2009–10																									
12	2010–11																									
13	2011–12																									
14	2012–13																									
15	2013–14																									
16	2014–15																									
17	2015–16																									
18	2016–17																									
19	2017–18																									
20	2018–19																									
21	2019–20																									
22	2020–21																									
23	2021–22																									
Seasons	Years	1	2	3	4	5	6	7	8	9	10	11	12	13	14	15	16	17	18	19	20	21	22	23	24	25
Seasons	Years	Episodes																								

Regular cast

×	Regular cast + no appearance

Recurring cast

Guest cast

No credit + no appearance

No episode

== Reception ==
When Law & Order: SVU first aired, Dave Mason, television editor for Ventura County Star, said Cragen was "played brilliantly" by Florek, and called the relationship between Cragen and Stabler the strongest aspect of the series. Alan Sepinwall, television columnist for The Star-Ledger, said the Cragen character "showed off more personality" in the film Exiled and on Special Victims Unit than the character exhibited in the original Law & Order.
