= Payback (Law & Order: Special Victims Unit) =

1999 episode of Law & Order: Special Victims Unit

- Law & Order: Special Victims Unit episode
- Anya Rugova (Gordana Rashovich) brutally stabbing herself in her restaurant in front of Detectives Benson (Mariska Hargitay), Stabler (Chris Meloni), and Munch (Richard Belzer) who is holding Marta Stevens (Mili Avital).
- Episode no.: Season 1 Episode 1
- Directed by: Jean de Segonzac
- Written by: Dick Wolf
- Production code: E0901
- Original air date: September 20, 1999
- Running time: 43 minutes

Guest appearances
- Gordana Rashovich as Anya Rugov; Dean Winters as Detective Brian Cassidy; Michelle Hurd as Detective Monique Jeffries; Isabel Gillies as Kathy Stabler; Elizabeth Ashley as Serena Benson; Ned Eisenberg as Jerry Kleinert; Tina Benko as Mrs. Panacek; Ronald Guttman as Gallery Owner; Leslie Hendrix as ME Elizabeth Rodgers; Jeremy Bergman as Nicholas Stevens; Judy Del Giudice as Judge Elizabeth Masullo; Chris Orbach as Detective Ken Briscoe; Special guest appearance by: Angie Harmon as Assistant District Attorney Abbie Carmichael; Mili Avital as Marta Stevens

Episode chronology
← Previous —	Next → "A Single Life"
- Law & Order: Special Victims Unit season 1

"Payback" is the pilot episode of the police procedural television series Law & Order: Special Victims Unit, the first spinoff of the original Law & Order series. It originally aired on NBC in the United States on September 20, 1999. In the episode, the detectives of the Special Victims Unit investigate a taxi-cab driver's brutal murder and castration. Detective Olivia Benson (Mariska Hargitay) becomes personally involved in the case after discovering that the taxi driver was a rapist and murderer himself.

== Plot ==
A white male cab driver in his mid-30s is found murdered in his cab. Detectives Olivia Benson and Elliot Stabler go to the scene; when they ask why the sex crimes unit was called, they are informed that the man's genitals have been removed. The cab driver's license says he is "Victor Spicer". However, after they run a background check on Victor Spicer they see that he (Matt Skollar) is serving a prison sentence at Riker's Island for male prostitution. They go and meet with him and he says that he sold his license to a man with a baby on Broadway for $100.

Benson and Stabler return to the precinct and are told that the victim died from 37 stab wounds and that forensics found a broken-off red fingernail. Benson is convinced the killer meant to kill the real Victor Spicer and they follow that lead, but it leads nowhere. By interviewing witnesses at a restaurant named Cabbie's diner, the detectives learn that the victim was last seen in his cab being hailed by two women. They are also able to inform his wife who is taking care of a young boy. Stabler finds out that Interpol made a positive hit on the victim, identifying him as Stefan Tanzic, a Serbian soldier indicted for crimes of ethnic cleansing and the rape of sixty-seven women, five of whom live in New York City.

Benson, who herself was conceived by rape, begins to sympathize with the killers. She and Stabler are called back to the morgue and they are told that there were two killers and two weapons. They start to look for the rape victims. The first one they talk to is Ileana Jashari (Sevanne Kassarjian) who is blinded and horribly scarred at the hands of Tanzic. Next, they go visit Marta Stevens (Mili Avital); they are told by her husband that Marta is at work. Benson notices a little boy who runs in the room with them, and she concludes that this little boy is the product of Marta's rape. When Benson visits her, Marta uses work as her alibi, but is not sorry that Tanzic is dead. She goes on to tell Benson about how she was repeatedly raped for twenty-three days. Benson leaves convinced that Marta is guilty, but does not arrest her, a move that upsets Stabler.

The third rape victim is in Europe and was there at the time of the murder, so she is ruled out. The fourth rape victim they look up is Anya Rugova (Gordana Rashovich). When they go to see her at the restaurant where she works, she says she was at the restaurant, but her hand is hurt. Stabler takes pictures of the two women to their witness at Cabbie's diner, but he cannot make a positive ID. However, he does say that he is sure they will recognize him. Stabler calls in arrests claiming he has a positive ID. Benson arrests Marta and advises her not to say anything without a lawyer. Stabler goes to arrest Anya, but she dives away from him, grabs a knife and stabs herself. As she is dying, she whispers something in his ear. Marta meets with Benson, Stabler and ADA Abbie Carmichael (Angie Harmon). Carmichael pleads her out at manslaughter 2 and sentences her to 18 months in a psychiatric hospital.

Cragen chastises Detectives Benson and Stabler for their sloppy investigative work in the case. Sitting in the squad room, Stabler tells Benson that the words Rugova whispered before she died were, "I just want to be with my family."

== Production ==
The pilot episode, "Payback", was written by series creator Dick Wolf and Law & Order franchise director, Jean de Segonzac. It marked the first appearance of Christopher Meloni and Mariska Hargitay, who auditioned for the show in 1999, in the roles of Elliot Stabler and Olivia Benson. Richard Belzer and Dann Florek were known to the producers for their previous appearances in Law & Order.

=== Casting ===
Casting for the lead characters of Law & Order: Special Victims Unit occurred in spring 1999. Dick Wolf, along with officials from NBC and Studios USA were at the final auditions for the two leads at Rockefeller Center. The last round had been narrowed down to six finalists. For the female lead, Detective Olivia Benson, actresses Samantha Mathis, Reiko Aylesworth, and Mariska Hargitay were being considered. For the male role, Detective Elliot Stabler, the finalists were Tim Matheson, John Slattery, Nick Chinlund, and Christopher Meloni. Hargitay and Meloni had auditioned in the final round together and, after the actors left, there was a moment of dead silence, after which Wolf blurted out, "Oh well. There's no doubt whom we should choose—Hargitay and Meloni." Wolf believed the duo had perfect chemistry from the first time he saw them together, and they ended up being his first choice. Garth Ancier, then head of NBC Entertainment, agreed, and the rest of the panel assembled began voicing their assent.

The first actor to be cast for the show was Dann Florek. Florek had originated the character of Captain Don Cragen in the 1988 pilot for Law & Order and played the character for the first three seasons of the show until he was fired on the orders of network executives, who wanted to add female characters to the all-male primary cast. He maintained a friendly relationship with Wolf, however, and went on to direct three episodes of the original series as well as to occasionally guest star on the show. Shortly after Florek reprised his role for Exiled: A Law & Order Movie, he received a call to be on Sex Crimes. Initially reluctant, he eventually agreed to star on the show as Cragen on the assurance that he would not be asked to audition for the role.

Shortly after the cancellation of Homicide: Life on the Street, Richard Belzer heard that Benjamin Bratt had left Law & Order. Belzer called his manager and instructed his manager to call Wolf and pitch the idea for Belzer's character from Homicide, John Munch, to become Lennie Briscoe's new partner since they had previously teamed in three Homicide crossovers. Wolf loved the idea, but had already cast Jesse L. Martin as Briscoe's new partner. The idea was reconfigured, however, to have Munch on Law & Order: Special Victims Unit instead. Since the character of Munch was created by David Simon and adapted for Homicide by Tom Fontana and Barry Levinson, the addition of Munch to the cast required the consent of all three. The appropriate agreements were reached and, while Fontana and Levinson agreed to waive their royalty rights, contracts with Simon required that he be paid royalties for any new show in which Munch was a main character; as a result, Simon would receive royalties every time Munch appeared in an episode of the show.

== Reception ==
=== Ratings ===
On its original airdate, September 20, 1999, the episode pulled a 5.4 in the age 18-49 demographic. The series premiere of SVU on NBC also aired with the premieres of CBS comedies Everybody Loves Raymond and Becker, with the premieres of UPN comedies Grown Ups and Malcolm & Eddie, and with the WB drama, Safe Harbor.

=== Critical response ===
Reviewstream.com said that the episode "raised the question as to whether everyone should get equal justice, or there should be exceptions based on who the person was" and gave it a positive review owing to the controversial plot.
