= Peter Blauner =

American novelist

- Born: October 29, 1959 (age 66)
- Occupations: Author; journalist; television producer
- Writing career
- Notable awards: Edgar Allan Poe Award for Best First Novel (1992)
- Website: peterblauner.com

Peter Blauner (born October 29, 1959) is an American author, journalist, and television producer.

Blauner has written nine novels, including Slow Motion Riot, which won the 1992 Edgar Award for Best First Novel from the Mystery Writers of America and was named an International Book of the Year by The Times Literary Supplement.

== Early career ==
Blauner started in journalism as an assistant to Pete Hamill, before reporting for the Newark Star-Ledger in New Jersey and the Norwich Bulletin in Connecticut. From 1982 to 1991, Blauner wrote for New York, covering crime, politics, and oddball city characters. Blauner also was the sole author of a full-length issue of the magazine, "The Voices of New York," (April 11, 1988), which was an oral history of the city from 1968 to 1988. He interviewed more than 70 famous and infamous New Yorkers for the issue.

== Novelist ==
In 1988, at the height of the crack epidemic, Blauner took a leave of absence from his journalism job and spent six months as a volunteer probation officer. He used those experiences as research for his first novel Slow Motion Riot. It won the Edgar award, and named an "International Book of the Year" in the Times Literary Supplement by Patricia Highsmith, who called it "unforgetttable." Blauner then spent several years researching a novel about Atlantic City, New Jersey. Casino Moon was published in 1994. For his next book, Blauner spent a year as a volunteer at a homeless shelter and visited the underground dwellings of "mole people" living beneath Manhattan's Riverside Park. The resulting novel The Intruder was a New York Times bestseller and a bestseller in England as well. Man of the Hour appeared in 1999: a pre-9/11 suspense novel about Middle Eastern terrorism in New York, the hysteria of modern celebrity, and the public school system. Blauner's next novel The Last Good Day, published in 2003 was a mystery story, set in the suburbs outside New York City in the immediate aftermath of 9/11. Slipping Into Darkness was published by Little Brown in 2006. It told the story of a young man who spends twenty years in prison for a crime that he may or may not have committed, and the detective who put him there.

In his book "On Writing: A Memoir of the Craft," Stephen King names two of Blauner's novels, The Intruder and The Last Good Day, on his recommended reading list.

== Later career ==
In more recent years, Blauner has been writing for television. He has been on the writing staffs of three shows in the Law & Order franchise. He served as a co-executive producer of Law & Order: SVU, where he was the writer of the show's 300th episode, "Manhattan Vigil," which was loosely based on his 2007 short story "Going, Going, Gone." A 2013 episode, "Legitimate Rape," co-written with Kevin Fox, was nominated for an Edgar award for best teleplay. From 2015 to 2018, he wrote as a co-executive producer for the CBS show, "Blue Bloods." His first novel in eleven years, Proving Ground, was published by Minotaur/St. Martin's Press in 2017. His eighth novel, Sunrise Highway, was published by Minotaur/St. Martin's in September, 2018. It reached the Los Angeles Times bestseller list for hardcover fiction.

Blauner's new novel, Picture in the Sand, which spans sixty years and the distance from Hollywood to Cairo, was published by Minotaur/St. Martin's Press on January 3, 2023. It is his first work of historical fiction.

== Novels ==
- 1991 - Slow Motion Riot
- 1994 - Casino Moon
- 1996 - The Intruder
- 1999 - Man of the Hour
- 2003 - The Last Good Day
- 2006 - Slipping Into Darkness
- 2017 - Proving Ground
- 2018 - Sunrise Highway
- 2023 - Picture in the Sand

== Short stories ==
- "Going, Going, Gone," The Best American Mystery Stories 2007. Selected Shorts from Symphony Space"
- "The Consultant," Wall Street Noir, 2007
- "Thank God for Charlie," The Rich and The Dead, 2011
- "The Chair," Kwik Krimes, 2013
- "The Final Testament," Mysterious Press, 2013
- "The Last Temptation of Frankie Lyman," Crime Plus Music, Three Rooms Press, 2016
