= Law & Order: Special Victims Unit season 17 =

Season of American television series

Law & Order: Special Victims Unit
- Season 17
- Season 17 U.S. DVD cover
- Starring: Mariska Hargitay; Kelli Giddish; Ice-T; Peter Scanavino; Raúl Esparza
- No. of episodes: 23

Release
- Original network: NBC
- Original release: September 23, 2015 – May 25, 2016

Season chronology
- ← Previous; Season 16 Next → Season 18

The seventeenth season of Law & Order: Special Victims Unit debuted on Wednesday, September 23, 2015 on NBC, and concluded on Wednesday, May 25, 2016.

== Production ==
NBC renewed Law & Order: Special Victims Unit for a seventeenth season on February 5, 2015. Mariska Hargitay (Olivia Benson) had her contract renewed for season 17, as well as Ice-T (Fin Tutuola). It was announced in March 2015 that season seventeen would be show runner/executive producer Warren Leight's last season on the show: Leight signed a three-year deal with Sony Pictures Television that allowed him to work on SVU for one final season. Production of season seventeen started in late May 2015 on the two-hour season premiere, afterwards the cast and crew took a hiatus and resumed filming on August 21, 2015. Executive producer Leight shared via Twitter that Hargitay would direct an episode, tweeting, "Of course Mariska will direct again this year. After 17 seasons, she's in a class of her own." Hargitay ultimately directed two episodes: "A Misunderstanding" and "Sheltered Outcasts."

=== Storylines and cast changes ===
It was announced at the end of the sixteenth season that star Danny Pino (who portrayed Nick Amaro) would be departing the cast; however, the producers did not kill off his character, leaving open the possibility of a return. Leight said to The Hollywood Reporter on character departures, "I try to leave that door open. I would like to be able to bring [Pino] back. At this point, it depends on where he is and what he's doing and what the story needs. That's one of the advantages of not killing a character that you like." Warren Leight told TV Guide that season seventeen's theme would focus on change and transitions whereas the sixteenth season focused on family; "it should be a year where wherever everyone starts at the beginning of the [season] is not where they end." Leight added that more character development would be in store for Raúl Esparza's ADA Barba and Peter Scanavino's Det. Carisi, as well as Benson (Hargitay) being promoted to lieutenant.

Kelli Giddish (Amanda Rollins), who gave birth to her first child in October 2015, had her character immersed in a pregnancy storyline. In the premiere episode, Rollins learns that she is pregnant, and tells Carisi and Benson the news; however, she also tells her co-workers that Amaro is not the father. In the fifth episode, "Community Policing," it is revealed that Lt. Declan Murphy (Donal Logue) is the father of Rollins' baby. She gives birth to a healthy baby girl after the events of the ninth episode, "Depravity Standard". On April 28, 2015, it was announced that SVU producers were planning a "transgender episode" for this season, "ripping from the headlines" Caitlyn Jenner's recent publicized transition. Warren Leight told Variety, "The world keeps evolving, and there are a lot of dark areas that we need to look at ... part of my challenge and everybody's challenge here is to keep it fresh and to not let a groove turn into a rut, and that can happen for any show at any time ... everyone here is really invested in keeping the show fresh and keeping the show on. We view every year's upfronts as a place to prove that we still deserve to be here." The episode, "Transgender Bridge", aired on September 30.

At the 2015 Television Critics Association's summer press tour, Law & Order and Chicago franchise creator Dick Wolf announced that there would be a four-show crossover between SVU and the three Chicago shows (Fire, P.D., and Med) as well as announcing his and other producers' desire for the revival of the original Law & Order series. However, in December 2015, Chicago P.D. showrunner Matt Olmstead revealed that there were no plans for a four-show crossover and that it would only be done if the producers found the right way to do it. Instead, a two-show crossover between SVU and P.D. aired in February 2016.

== Cast ==
=== Main ===
- Mariska Hargitay as Sergeant / Lieutenant Olivia Benson
- Kelli Giddish as Junior Detective Amanda Rollins
- Ice-T as Senior Detective Fin Tutuola
- Peter Scanavino as Junior Detective Dominick "Sonny" Carisi, Jr.
- Raúl Esparza as Assistant District Attorney Rafael Barba

=== Special guest stars ===
- Jason Beghe as Chicago Police Department Sergeant Hank Voight
- Richard Belzer as District Attorney Investigator John Munch
- Sophia Bush as Chicago Police Department Detective Erin Lindsay
- Donal Logue as Lieutenant Declan Murphy
- Jon Seda as Chicago Police Department Detective Antonio Dawson
- BD Wong as FBI Special Agent Dr. George Huang

=== Recurring ===
- Betsy Aidem as Dr. Sloane
- Max Baker as Colin Bennett
- Ami Brabson as Judge Karyn Blake
- Stephen C. Bradbury as Judge Colin McNamara
- Robert John Burke as Internal Affairs Bureau Lieutenant / Captain Ed Tucker
- Jason Cerbone as Defense Attorney Lorenzo Desappio
- Vincent Curatola as Judge Al Burtuccio
- Dashiell Eaves as Sergeant Kevin Donlan
- Peter Gallagher as Deputy Chief William Dodds
- Mary Hodges as Judge Anita Wright
- Tabitha Holbert as Assistant District Attorney Rose Callier
- Andy Karl as Sergeant Mike Dodds
- Yvonna Kopacz-Wright as Dr. Darby Wilder
- Robert Sean Leonard as Assistant District Attorney Kenneth O'Dwyer
- Sonia Manzano as Judge Gloria Pepitone
- Elizabeth Marvel as Defense Attorney Rita Calhoun
- Michael Mastro as Judge Serani
- Jefferson Mays as Medical Examiner Dr. Carl Rudnick
- Lauren Noble as Carmen
- Leslie Odom Jr. as Reverend Curtis Scott
- Josh Pais as Deputy Commissioner Hank Abraham
- Jessica Phillips as Assistant District Attorney Pippa Cox
- Lindsay Pulsipher as Kim Rollins
- Bronwyn Reed as Lucy Huston
- Dallas Roberts as Dr. Gregory Yates
- Steve Rosen as Defence Attorney Michael Guthrie
- Jenna Stern as Judge Elana Barth
- Tamara Tunie as Medical Examiner Dr. Melinda Warner
- Karen Tsen Lee as Medical Examiner Susan Chung
- Caris Vujcec as Detective Louise Campesi
- Delaney Williams as Defense Attorney John Buchanan
- Scott William Winters as Detective Joe Dumas

=== Guest stars ===
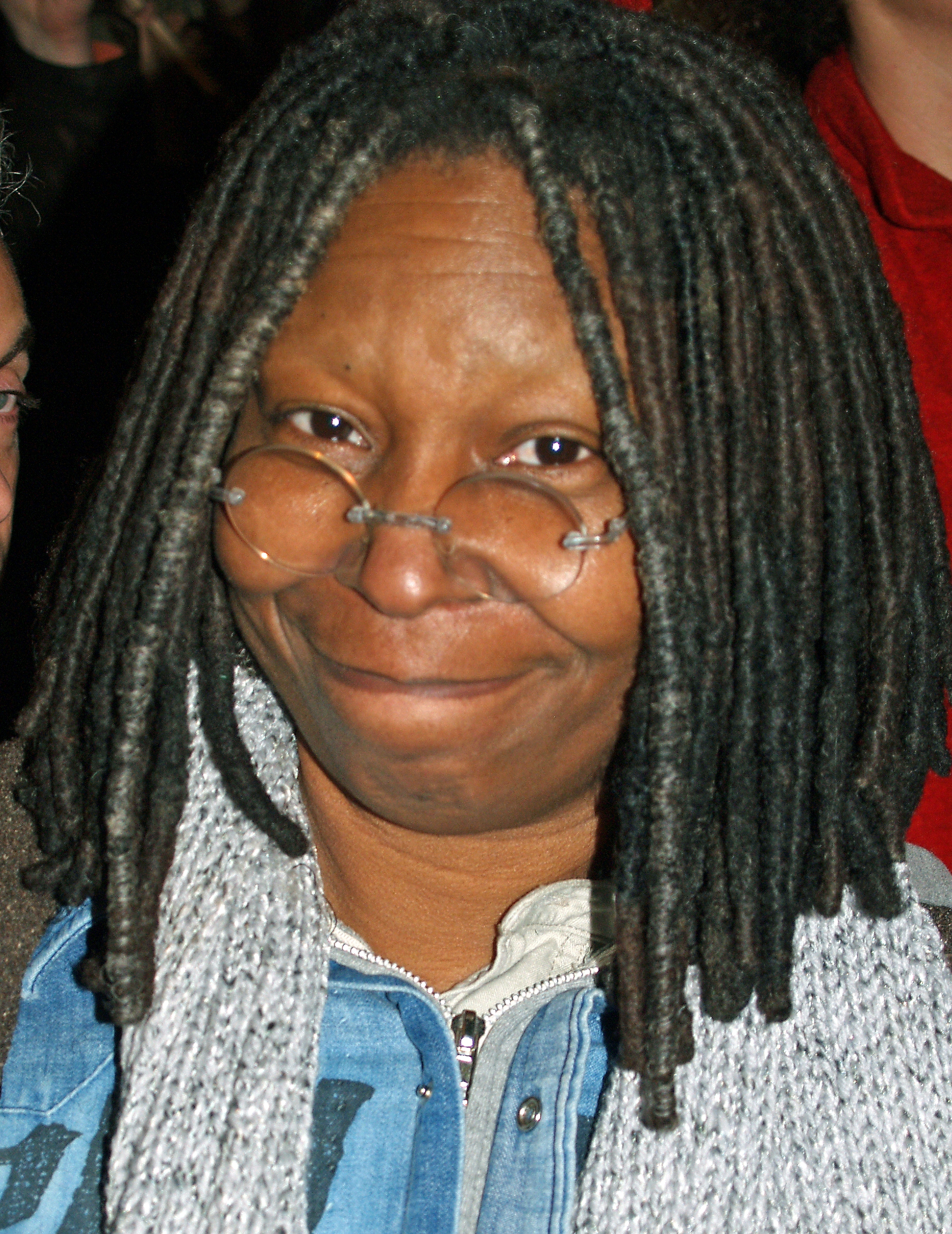
Whoopi Goldberg portrayed Janette Grayson, a Child Services supervisor whose allegedly fake reports put multiple children at risk.

It was announced in May 2015, that Dallas Roberts would return to SVU in the two-hour season premiere as serial rapist/killer, Dr. Gregory Yates from the sixteenth season two-hour crossover episode "Daydream Believer" with Chicago P.D.. The premiere episode was "ripped from the headlines" and surrounded Robert Durst, his murder trial, and explored some of his possible connections to a series of rape/murders that span 20 years.

Danny Burstein and Rebecca Luker appeared in "Transgender Bridge" as the parents of a transgender teen who is assaulted. The two theatre stars were married in real life.

Whoopi Goldberg was cast in a guest starring role for the October 7 episode "Institutional Fail". Goldberg portrayed Janette Grayson, a Department of Child Services supervisor whose allegedly fake reports put multiple children at risk. Grayson finds herself on trial when the agency's internal policies bring in the wrong kind of publicity. Peter Gallagher also guest stars in the same episode, reprising his role of Chief Dodds, alongside Goldberg, Jessica Pimental and John Magaro.

In "Community Policing", Donal Logue returned to SVU as Lt. Declan Murphy, after finding out about Rollins' pregnancy. Rollins revealed to Murphy that he is the father of her child. Actors from Broadway's Hamilton, Leslie Odom, Jr. and Daveed Diggs also guest-starred in "Community Policing". Daveed Diggs returns in "Forty One Witnesses," alongside Hamilton costar Anthony Ramos.

Andy Karl was cast in the recurring role of Sgt. Mike Dodds, son of Chief William Dodds (played by Peter Gallagher). His character was introduced to the unit as Benson's No. 2. This reunited Karl and Gallagher after starring in the 2015 Broadway revival of the musical On the Twentieth Century.

Lindsay Pulsipher returned this season to portray Kim Rollins, Amanda's sister, who was last seen in the season fourteen episode, "Deadly Ambition". Kim brings their mother with her to New York, Beth Anne Rollins, (portrayed by Virginia Madsen) who feels her police-officer daughter has turned her back on the family. Warren Leight commented to TV Guide, "Even if their intent is to be supportive, and I'm not even sure it is, her family showing up is not a great thing for her – nothing good comes from seeing her sister or her mother."

Christopher Sieber and Geneva Carr guest starred in the episode "Patrimonial Burden" as the parents of a large, religious family known for their reality show. The episode was inspired by the Joshua Duggar molestation scandal and also featured Chris Elliott as a crew member on the show. Elliott previously appeared in the tenth season episode "Lunacy", while Carr had appeared in two previous episodes, making this her third character portrayal on the series (not to mention her appearances on other iterations of the Law & Order universe).

Carolee Carmello, Nick Cordero, and Ali Wentworth all guested in the eighth episode "Melancholy Pursuit".

Former series regular BD Wong reprised his role as Dr. George Huang in the episode "Depravity Standard". The storyline revisited the case from the fourteenth season episode "Manhattan Vigil", and saw Huang testify in court for the defense. This episode marked Wong's fourth guest appearance on the series following his departure from the main cast in the twelfth season.

Roberts reprised his role of Yates in "Nationwide Manhunt", which starts a crossover with Chicago P.D. that concludes on "The Song of Gregory William Yates". Jason Beghe, Sophia Bush, Jon Seda also guest starred in the crossover. Seda previously appeared in a crossover episode of the original Law & Order as Detective Paul Falsone from Homicide: Life on the Street.

Kevin Tighe, who played Gregory Searle in the season 9 episode "Avatar", reprises his role in "Sheltered Outcasts" as a patient in a level three sex offender rehabilitation center.

Former series regular Richard Belzer reprised his role as John Munch in the episode "Fashionable Crimes", where Munch returns to SVU to assist in the case of a young model who claims to have been preyed upon by a famous fashion photographer. Munch and Fin had their eyes on the photographer in the past, but were unable to build a case at the time.

In April 2016, it was announced that Brad Garrett would guest star in the two-part season finale which aired on May 18 and 25. He portrayed the role of Gary Munson, a correctional officer who holds a reputation of being a family man, along with a history of corruption and violence against women.

== Episodes ==
Law & Order: Special Victims Unit season 17 episodes
No. overall	No. in season	Title	Directed by	Written by	Original release date	Prod. code	U.S. viewers (millions)
367	1	"Devil's Dissections"	Jean de Segonzac	Story by : Kevin Fox; Teleplay by : Warren Leight & Julie Martin	September 23, 2015	1701	8.27
The SVU returns to the beach where serial killer Gregory Yates (Dallas Roberts) had buried his victims when another body is washed ashore. Rollins visits Yates in prison, where Yates provides information that leads the squad to a different suspect (medical examiner Carl Rudnick, M.D., who had performed the autopsy), causing Barba to consider the possibility of Yates appealing his conviction.: Episode inspired by Robert Durst and his possible connections to the Long Island serial killer murders from the past two decades.
368	2	"Criminal Pathology"	Alex Chapple	Story by : Kevin Fox; Teleplay by : Julie Martin & Warren Leight	September 23, 2015	1702	8.27
The SVU team conducts a secondary investigation into Yates' murders when Yates' fiancée's dismembered body is washed ashore. Clues lead to deputy chief medical examiner Carl Rudnick (Jefferson Mays), who failed to disclose his past association with Yates. After Benson places Rudnick under arrest, Barba pushes the SVU team to gather as much evidence against him as possible to secure a conviction. With a trial looming, Rudnick hires two defense attorneys (Elizabeth Marvel and Delaney Williams) . Meanwhile, Rollins discovers that she is pregnant.: Episode inspired by Robert Durst and his possible connections to the Long Island serial killer murders from the past two decades.
369	3	"Transgender Bridge"	Arthur W. Forney	Story by : Julie Martin & Warren Leight; Teleplay by : Jill Abbinanti & Céline C. Robinson	September 30, 2015	1703	6.69
A transgender teen, Avery, is sent to the hospital for injuries inflicted when three boys bullied and then pushed her off a walking bridge. Although Avery shows forgiveness to the boys, ADA Kenneth O'Dwyer (Robert Sean Leonard) takes the case out of family court and decides to try one of the offenders on adult charges. Detective Tutuola and the SVU squad are conflicted on whether the crime fits the charges, while dealing with the families involved.
370	4	"Institutional Fail"	Martha Mitchell	Story by : Samantha Corbin-Miller; Teleplay by : Julie Martin & Brianna Yellen	October 7, 2015	1704	7.00
When a child is found wandering the streets alone, Benson and SVU search for the neglectful mother, only to find another child in danger in the same home. After Benson questions the social worker (John Magaro), they discovered he has not visited the family's home in months, leading Benson to push Barba to prosecute the social worker's supervisor (Whoopi Goldberg) for falsifying records. When one child dies, Benson and Barba intensify their case against social services, which is met with resistance by Deputy Chief Dodds and 1PP. Meanwhile, Dodds announces Benson's promotion to lieutenant and his choice for her new sergeant: his son, Mike.
371	5	"Community Policing"	Jean de Segonzac	Story by : Kevin Fox; Teleplay by : Warren Leight & A. Zell Williams	October 14, 2015	1705	6.20
While in pursuit of an SVU rape suspect, detectives from the 27th precinct shoot and kill an unarmed black man. Internal Affairs investigates the shooting, but under intense pressure from the Mayor and the DA, Barba takes the case to a grand jury to indict the cops. While Benson believes the detectives were following procedure, Barba disagrees, creating a tense divide between the newly-minted lieutenant and the ADA.
372	6	"Maternal Instincts"	Michael Pressman	Story by : Robert Brooks Cohen; Teleplay by : Warren Leight & Julie Martin	October 21, 2015	1706	6.33
While Rollins' mother (Virginia Madsen) throws her a baby shower, the SVU is called to a hotel after a violinist is raped by her flautist colleague, Anton (Zach McGowan). The man has no recollection of his wrongdoings and claims he was drugged and robbed by an escort. When the security tape arrives, Rollins sees that it was her fugitive sister, Kim (Lindsay Pulsipher), who stole Anton's flute, leading her to have to track down her sister before Benson and Tutuola find out her secret. Meanwhile, Deputy Chief Dodds introduces his son, Mike (Andy Karl), as SVU's new sergeant.
373	7	"Patrimonial Burden"	Martha Mitchell	Story by : Warren Leight & Julie Martin; Teleplay by : Jill Abbinanti & Céline C. Robinson	November 4, 2015	1707	6.55
The SVU investigates pregnant 13-year old Lane Baker from a famous reality TV family with 10 children. After initial hesitation by the parents to let the girl talk with detectives, Lane confesses that the family's cameraman had sex with her. However, the cameraman shows footage that Lane is covering for her brother, Graham, who has multiple past accusations of sexual misconduct. When SVU looks into the family tree, Benson and Carisi realize that there is evidence of a cover-up, not only within the famous family but also in the entire small-town community. Meanwhile, Rollins experiences pregnancy health issues and is ordered on bed rest.: Episode inspired by the Josh Duggar molestation controversy.
374	8	"Melancholy Pursuit"	Michael Pressman	Story by : Brianna Yellen & Samantha Corbin-Miller; Teleplay by : Warren Leight & Julie Martin	November 11, 2015	1708	7.76
A girl goes missing and SVU is called in to find the 15-year old. When the girl turns up dead, Sgt. Dodds begins to feel overwhelmed by the case. Dr. Warner is able to get a partial DNA match, but the match is to a dead man who had many children with different women. As SVU weaves through a complicated family history, Dodds becomes determined to find the man responsible. • Episode inspire by the Murder of Yara Gambirasio.
375	9	"Depravity Standard"	Martha Mitchell	Ed Zuckerman	November 18, 2015	1709	6.29
Three years after Benson arrested him, Lewis Hodda (Tom Sizemore) refuses a plea deal on kidnapping charges. When the parents of the kidnapped boy refuse to let him testify, Barba must try Hodda on murder charges for a 1999 abduction that Benson also handled. Benson's interrogation tactics come under fire and the savvy defense attorney (Robin Weigert) hires former SVU colleague, Dr. Huang (BD Wong), to challenge Barba's already-shaky case in court. Meanwhile, Rollins goes into labor, but faces extreme difficulties.
376	10	"Catfishing Teacher"	Michael Slovis	Kevin Fox	January 6, 2016	1710	7.84
A high school teacher has sex with two of her students. Another student, Zack Foster, receives text messages, supposedly from her, to meet her at a train station and bring his passport. However, she does not show up and Zack is, instead, kidnapped by his wrestling coach, who has a history of molesting his athletes. Zack is taken to a cabin in Pennsylvania where he is tracked down by the SVU team. When Zack's parents refuse to allow him to testify in court, SVU turns to another victim, Nat Dennehy, who still resides in New York. Nat also refuses to testify but goes to the coach's house, determined to get a confession from him. Meanwhile, Rollins adjusts to motherhood with her new daughter.
377	11	"Townhouse Incident"	Nick Gomez	Brianna Yellen	January 13, 2016	1711	8.01
When Benson's sitter expresses concern over another mother for whom she babysits, Benson looks into the matter and steps into the middle of a violent home invasion where she becomes a hostage. To protect the family and save her own life, Benson works to get inside the perps' heads while SVU and newly promoted Internal Affairs Bureau (IAB) Captain Ed Tucker (Robert John Burke) works the escalating situation from the outside to rescue the lieutenant.
378	12	"A Misunderstanding"	Mariska Hargitay	Céline C. Robinson	January 20, 2016	1712	6.91
A typical he-said she-said rape case lands on Benson's desk after Rita Calhoun (Elizabeth Marvel) brings it to her attention. With SVU now entangled in a murky case, the detectives must wade through the emotions of two high school students while the parents try to save their children's futures. When Barba brings the case to trial, lies are exposed that make his prosecution even more difficult.
379	13	"Forty-One Witnesses"	Michael Pressman	Robert Brooks Cohen	February 3, 2016	1713	7.31
When an intoxicated woman is attacked outside of her apartment building, the SVU team investigates, only to find out that there are multiple witnesses who didn't call for help. While the woman struggles to remember what happened to her, Benson and Barba must deal with the unreliability of those witnesses in making an ID of the attackers. The case catches a break when Carisi is able to convince an unassuming witness to step up and testify in court.
380	14	"Nationwide Manhunt"	Alex Chapple	Warren Leight & Julie Martin	February 10, 2016	1714	7.59
Benson calls CPD Sgt. Voight (Jason Beghe) after Gregory Yates (Dallas Roberts), whom they jointly arrested last year, claims that some of the unidentified remains from the beach have ties to Chicago. Voight sends Detectives Lindsay and Dawson (Sophia Bush and Jon Seda) to New York to interview Yates. However, when Benson, Barba and Dodds return to Green Haven to meet with Yates again, they learn that he has escaped with fellow convict Dr. Carl Rudnick (Jefferson Mays), triggering a massive manhunt.: This episode begins a crossover with Chicago P.D. that concludes on "The Song of Gregory Williams Yates". It is included on the Chicago P.D. Season 3 DVD set.; Episode inspired in part by the 2015 Clinton Correctional Facility escape.
381	15	"Collateral Damages"	Rosemary Rodriguez	Samantha Corbin-Miller	February 17, 2016	1715	7.73
SVU goes undercover to arrest a former boxing champion who had been suspected of having sex with minors. When they make the arrest, the boxer makes a deal with Barba to give up pedophiles active in distributing online child pornography. The detectives track down the address of an online pedophile but, when they discover the man (Josh Pais) to be a high ranking police official, whose wife (Jessica Phillips) is also a Corporation Counsel attorney who has worked with SVU before on previous cases, Benson must delicately handle the now high-profile case. Meanwhile, Dodds is offered a position with the joint terrorism task force by his father but decides to stay with SVU, boldly going against the Deputy Chief's wishes.
382	16	"Star-Struck Victims"	Michael Pressman	A. Zell Williams	February 24, 2016	1716	6.47
Kristi Cryer (Vivien Cardone), a vlogger, reports that she was sexually assaulted by a bartender (James Madio). However, during the investigation, it is revealed that she was also assaulted by a famous actor, Bobby D'Amico (Craig Bierko), who has ties to the NYPD. With minimal evidence and little corroboration of the victim's account, Barba decides to drop the charges, prompting Rollins to do an undercover stint. Rollins' undercover job lends credence to Kristi's rape claim, but reasonable doubt comes into play and claims arise that SVU entrapped the actor.: Episode inspired by the Bill Cosby sexual assault allegations of the previous several decades.
383	17	"Manhattan Transfer"	Alex Chapple	Story by : Julie Martin & Warren Leight; Teleplay by : Kevin Fox & Brendan Feeney	March 2, 2016	1717	6.86
Carisi is sent into a brothel to complete a sting operation but, when arrests are made, it is discovered that the Vice Unit is running an operation as well. Benson gets pressure from the Vice Unit captain to drop the case, so she turns to Tucker at IAB to look into the police involved. Tucker discovers that his cousin, who is a priest at a local Catholic church, knew the victims, but a friendly family visit soon turns to suspicion. When Barba gets information on the case from the church's monsignor, he reveals to Benson that Tucker could be covering up crimes committed by the Vice cops. Benson hesitantly reveals that she is romantically involved with Tucker, triggering her suspension from SVU.
384	18	"Unholiest Alliance"	Jean de Segonzac	Story by : Kevin Fox & Brendan Feeney; Teleplay by : Warren Leight & Julie Martin	March 23, 2016	1718	6.11
With Benson transferred out of SVU, the detectives work to reveal a massive cover-up in the Catholic church. When their main witness to the crimes is murdered, they must figure out who within the clergy is responsible. As they struggle with leads, Tucker's cousin is discovered to have a dark secret that may help Benson and Tucker keep their jobs, along with arresting the criminals involved.
385	19	"Sheltered Outcasts"	Mariska Hargitay	Ed Zuckerman	March 30, 2016	1719	6.07
With Carisi undercover at a homeless shelter, another rape in a recent string of attacks occurs nearby. Trying to determine if one of the residents is responsible, Carisi gets himself into hot water with members of the shelter and the community. When a shelter advocate is murdered, Benson debates pulling Carisi out, but they catch a break thanks to some fellow shelter members.
386	20	"Fashionable Crimes"	Martha Mitchell	Penelope Koechl & Jill Lorie Hurst	May 4, 2016	1720	5.26
An aspiring model says that she was raped by a famous photographer whose assistant did nothing to stop it. Former SVU Sergeant John Munch (Richard Belzer) helps the SVU squad question previous clients of the photographer, many of whom admit that they were pressured to have sex with him, but refuse to testify against him as it could jeopardize their careers.: This was Richard Belzer's final on-screen appearance on SVU, and in his lifetime; he died on February 19, 2023.
387	21	"Assaulting Reality"	Alex Chapple	Story by : Brianna Yellen & Robert Brooks Cohen; Teleplay by : Julie Martin, Warren Leight, Brianna Yellen, & Robert Brooks Cohen	May 11, 2016	1721	6.06
A contestant on Heart's Desire claims she was raped and SVU intervenes. When they question the man who was involved with the victim, they discover he is innocent, that it was another man in the house who committed the crime. All the while, the executive producers of the show hide evidence from the police and put the blame on their producer.
388	22	"Intersecting Lives"	Jonathan Starch	Julie Martin & Warren Leight	May 18, 2016	1722	5.78
Tutuola's son, Ken, tells him that a former inmate says she has been raped by Rikers correctional officer Gary Munson (Brad Garrett), who denies the allegation. Barba has SVU quietly investigate the claim by questioning Munson and other officers about a supposed human trafficking ring. After Munson is arrested and Barba gets an indictment, the ADA finds his life threatened when the correctional officer's union intervenes. (Part 1 of 2)
389	23	"Heartfelt Passages"	Alex Chapple	Warren Leight & Julie Martin	May 25, 2016	1723	7.19
Correctional Officer Munson's wife, Lisa, solicits Benson's help as she plans to divorce her husband. Sergeant Dodds volunteers to accompany Benson to the Munson household, where Lisa packs up to leave with her kids. When Benson goes outside to take the kids to the car, Munson brandishes a pistol and takes Dodds and Lisa hostage. A struggle for the gun later ensues, causing a bullet to discharge into Dodds' abdomen. Although he survives the surgery, Dodds suffers a stroke in the Intensive Care Unit and dies after blood clots form in his brain. Meanwhile, Barba seeks SVU's help as the threats he is receiving continue; Tucker reveals to Benson that he plans to transfer out of IAB and into hostage negotiations; and Carisi puts his plans of becoming an ADA on hold. (Part 2 of 2)

== Reception ==
No.	Title	Air date	Ratings/share (18–49)	Viewers (millions)	DVR 18–49	DVR viewers (millions)	Total 18–49	Total viewers (millions)	Rank (week)
1	"Devil's Dissections"	September 23, 2015	1.8/6	8.27	1.2	3.11	3.0	11.38	—N/a
2	"Criminal Pathology"	September 23, 2015	1.8/6	8.27	1.2	3.11	3.0	11.38	—N/a
3	"Transgender Bridge"	September 30, 2015	1.7/5	6.69	1.0	2.67	2.7	9.39	—N/a
4	"Institutional Fail"	October 7, 2015	1.6/5	7.00	1.0	2.76	2.6	8.95	—N/a
5	"Community Policing"	October 14, 2015	1.5/5	6.20	1.1	2.88	2.6	9.20	—N/a
6	"Maternal Instincts"	October 21, 2015	1.5/5	6.33	1.0	2.88	2.5	9.20	—N/a
7	"Patrimonial Burden"	November 4, 2015	1.5/5	6.55	1.4	3.17	2.9	9.72	—N/a
8	"Melancholy Pursuit"	November 11, 2015	2.0/6	7.76	1.3	3.22	3.3	11.00	—N/a
9	"Depravity Standard"	November 18, 2015	1.4/5	6.29	—N/a	—N/a	—N/a	—N/a	—N/a
10	"Catfishing Teacher"	January 6, 2016	1.8/5	7.86	1.1	2.93	2.9	10.79	—N/a
11	"Townhouse Incident"	January 13, 2016	2.0/6	8.01	—N/a	—N/a	—N/a	—N/a	—N/a
12	"A Misunderstanding"	January 20, 2016	1.7/5	6.91	—N/a	—N/a	—N/a	—N/a	—N/a
13	"Forty-One Witnesses"	February 3, 2016	1.8/6	7.31	—N/a	—N/a	—N/a	—N/a	—N/a
14	"Nationwide Manhunt"	February 10, 2016	1.9/6	7.69	1.0	2.85	2.8	10.16	—N/a
15	"Collateral Damages"	February 17, 2016	1.7/5	7.73	1.2	3.03	2.9	10.77	—N/a
16	"Star-Struck Victims"	February 24, 2016	1.5/5	6.47	1.1	2.80	2.6	9.27	—N/a
17	"Manhattan Transfer"	March 2, 2016	1.6/5	6.86	1.2	3.18	2.8	10.04	—N/a
18	"Unholiest Alliance"	March 23, 2016	1.5/5	6.11	1.1	2.83	2.6	8.97	—N/a
19	"Sheltered Outcasts"	March 30, 2016	1.4/5	6.07	—N/a	—N/a	—N/a	—N/a	—N/a
20	"Fashionable Crimes"	May 4, 2016	1.1/4	5.26	—N/a	—N/a	—N/a	—N/a	—N/a
21	"Assaulting Reality"	May 11, 2016	1.4/5	6.06	—N/a	—N/a	—N/a	—N/a	—N/a
22	"Intersecting Lives"	May 18, 2016	1.3/4	5.78	—N/a	—N/a	—N/a	—N/a	—N/a
23	"Heartfelt Passages"	May 25, 2016	1.6/6	7.19	—N/a	—N/a	—N/a	—N/a	—N/a
