= Olivia Benson =

Fictional character on Law & Order: Special Victims Unit

Captain Olivia Benson
- Law & Order: Special Victims Unit character
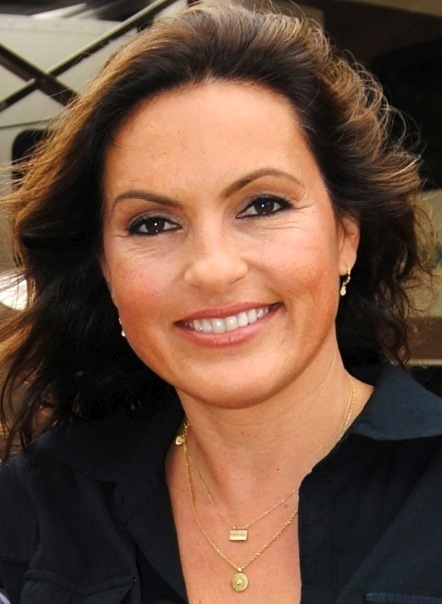
- Mariska Hargitay on set of Law & Order: Special Victims Unit (2011)
- First appearance: "Payback" (1999)
- Portrayed by: Mariska Hargitay

In-universe information
- Full name: Olivia Margaret Benson
- Title(s): NYPD Officer (Before show, 1992–1998); NYPD Junior Detective (seasons 1–12, 1998–2011); NYPD Senior Detective (seasons 13–15, 2011–2013); NYPD Sergeant (seasons 15–17, 2013–2015); NYPD Lieutenant (seasons 17–21, 2015–2019); NYPD Captain (seasons 21–present, 2019–present)
- Family: Joseph Hollister (father) (deceased); Serena Benson (mother) (deceased); Simon Marsden (paternal half-brother) (deceased); Tracy Harrison (sister-in-law); Ty Harrison (step-nephew); Olivia Marsden (paternal niece); Noah Porter-Benson (adopted son)
- Partner: Elliot Stabler (before show; seasons 1–12; 1998–2011); Nick Amaro (seasons 13–15); Amanda Rollins (season 14)
- Seasons: L&O: 10, 16, 21, 22, 24; SVU: 1, 2, 3, 4, 5, 6, 7, 8, 9, 10, 11, 12, 13, 14, 15, 16, 17, 18, 19, 20, 21, 22, 23, 24, 25, 26, 27, 28; TBJ: 1 OC: 1, 2, 3, 5

Olivia Margaret "Liv" Benson is a fictional character and the protagonist of the NBC police procedural drama Law & Order: Special Victims Unit, portrayed by Mariska Hargitay. Benson holds the rank and pay-grade of Captain and is the Commanding Officer of the Manhattan branch of the Special Victims Unit within the New York City Police Department, which operates out of the 16th Precinct. She investigates sexual offenses such as rape and child sexual abuse.

When the series began, Benson held the rank of detective. Benson was partnered with Detective Elliot Stabler (Christopher Meloni), serving as the junior member of the pair. Following Stabler's departure at the end of the 12th season after a deadly shootout in the precinct, she is partnered with Detective Nick Amaro (Danny Pino) and she promoted by becoming the senior member. During the 15th season, Benson is promoted to sergeant and appointed as squad supervisor in the wake of the retirement of Sergeant John Munch (Richard Belzer). Soon afterward, Captain Donald Cragen (Dann Florek) retires, and appoints Benson acting commanding officer of SVU until Lieutenant Declan Murphy (Donal Logue) comes to the squad. In Season 17, she is promoted to Lieutenant and becomes the squad's official commanding officer. She is promoted to captain in the 21st season.

The character first appeared in the Law & Order: Special Victims Unit pilot episode, "Payback", which aired September 20, 1999. Hargitay remains the only original cast member on the series. As of season 27, Benson has been credited in 594 episodes of SVU (620 in the franchise/universe). With the premiere of season 21, Hargitay's Benson became the longest running prime-time live-action character of all time, surpassing the 20-season record, as well as Belzer's John Munch, who was a regular character for 22 seasons (7 on Homicide: Life on the Street and 15 on SVU).

== Character overview ==
Series creator Dick Wolf named his two lead detectives after his son, Elliot, and his daughter, Olivia. Wolf conceived Benson as a detective in the Manhattan Special Victims Unit, which investigates sex crimes. For the first 12 seasons of the show, she is partnered with Elliot Stabler (Christopher Meloni); after he resigns (offscreen) at the beginning of season 13, she is partnered with Nick Amaro (Danny Pino) until season 15, where Benson becomes the commanding officer of Manhattan SVU; first as Sergeant, then Lieutenant, and finally Captain.

=== Personality ===
Benson is tough but empathetic, getting emotionally involved in cases. Executive producer and head writer Neal Baer has explained that Benson is "the empathetic, passionate voice for these victims," in contrast to Stabler, who embodies "the rage we feel, the 'How can this happen?' feeling." Of their partnership, Baer assessed that: "They both represent the feelings that we feel simultaneously when we hear about these cases. That's why they work so well together."

=== Family ===
Born February 7, 1968, Benson was conceived by her mother's rape. Her mother's rapist, Joseph Hollister, later committed suicide. Benson's mother, Serena (Elizabeth Ashley), an English professor, was an alcoholic who abused Olivia emotionally and physically. In the season 2 episode "Taken", Serena dies falling down a flight of subway stairs outside the entrance to a bar.

In a later episode, "Intoxicated", Benson mentions being engaged briefly when she was 16 to one of her mother's students; when her mother found out, she broke a bottle of vodka and went after her with it. Benson fought back, kicked her mother twice, and ran out of the house. Years later, Benson reunites with her former fiancé, true crime podcaster Burton Lowe (Aidan Quinn), while they are both investigating a cold case, and they sleep together. When Lowe is accused of taking advantage of several young women, Benson gradually comes to believe that despite its consensual nature, their relationship was actually sexual abuse, due to the power differential and age difference. A woman later reports to Benson that Lowe, who is in a 12-step program for his alcoholism, tried to make amends to her for drunkenly raping her six months earlier. Benson helps Lowe accept responsibility for what he did, and he pleads guilty to sexual misconduct to spare his victim the trauma of a trial.

Benson is a graduate of Siena College. While there, she held a membership in a sorority. In addition to English, Benson speaks some Italian, Russian, some Spanish and French, and is able to recite the Miranda warnings in at least two other languages. She owns a black 1965 Ford Mustang convertible, but rarely drives it.

Benson had a younger half-brother named Simon Marsden (Michael Weston). Simon, whom she found by illegally running her DNA through the system, was a suspect in a rape case. However, his name was cleared after it is revealed that he was framed by Captain Julia Millfield (Kim Delaney), who believed (incorrectly) that he sexually assaulted her sister when they were in high school. In the season 13 episode "Child's Welfare", Simon reveals to Benson that he is planning to marry a woman named Tracy (Nicole Beharie), with whom he has a daughter and a stepson; he named his daughter Olivia after Benson. When the children are taken by the City because of Simon's criminal background, Benson calls defense attorney Bayard Ellis (Andre Braugher), an old friend of hers, to help Simon and Tracy get the children back. When a judge denies the Marsdens custody of their children, Simon panics and kidnaps them. Ellis makes a deal to have Simon serve a 60-day sentence, knocking his charge down from kidnapping to a misdemeanor, custodial interference. One of the conditions of the reduced charges is that he must give up his custody petition and agree to visit his daughter only in a supervised setting for the next three years. Simon is reluctant, but Benson tells him that the deal is better than his daughter visiting him in jail.

In the season 21 episode "Murdered at a Bad Address", Simon reaches out to Benson for the first time in years as his only remaining family, Tracy having left him and taken their children. She hesitantly agrees to meet with him, but when he doesn't show up, she leaves him a voicemail cutting him out of her life for good. Shortly afterward, he is found dead of a heroin overdose; she feels responsible, believing that he overdosed out of despair after she disowned him. A year later, however, she learns that he was in fact murdered by a gang of prostitutes who rob and kill their clients with heroin and fentanyl, which happened before Benson left that voicemail.

In season 12, Benson is named the legal guardian of a young boy named Calvin Arliss (Charlie Tahan). Calvin's mother, Vivian (Maria Bello), abandons him and flees when Benson's investigation uncovers that Vivian (also a child of rape) may have killed her mother's rapist, Walter Burlock (R. Lee Ermey). Vivian names Benson as Calvin's legal guardian. Calvin lives with her for a while, until she finds Vivian and her lover Sara Hoyt (Kat Foster) have relapsed into drug use. Sara confesses to murdering Burlock before she is herself murdered by Calvin's father. Vivian revokes Benson's guardianship and sends Calvin to live with his grandparents in Vermont. Both Calvin and Benson are devastated by the separation. In season 13, she is seen with Calvin and his grandparents during or right before Halloween.

At the conclusion of the season 15 finale, Benson becomes the court-appointed custodial guardian of Noah Porter, an orphaned baby (twins Bradley and Skyler Dubow). The appointment is for a trial period of one year, with the option to apply for legal adoption at the end of that period. Although the year is rocky due to Noah's health issues and the demands of her job, Benson grows to love Noah and begins formal adoption proceedings a year later. After taking custody of Noah, Benson learns that Noah's biological father is a pimp and serial rapist named John "Johnny D" Drake (Charles Halford), who trafficked and raped Noah's mother, Ellie Porter (Emma Greenwell). Ellie was later sold to another sex trafficker, Angel Perez (Manny Pérez), who had her killed when she was going testify against him. Upon learning of his son, Drake sues for custody as a ploy to get out of prison, imperiling Benson's chances of adopting Noah. Benson's problems are solved when Drake is killed during a courtroom shootout, but she still occasionally worries that Noah has inherited his father's violent tendencies.

At the end of the season 19 premiere "Gone Fishin'" (first of ongoing appearance of Ryan Buggle as an older Noah, following Jack Nawada-Braunwart in seasons 17–18), Benson learns that she is being investigated by the DA's office on suspicions of abusing Noah. The investigation is dropped in "Mood". In "Contrapasso", her lawyer Trevor Langan (Peter Hermann, Hargitay's real-life husband) returns to tell her that Noah has a grandmother, Sheila Porter (Brooke Shields), Ellie's mother. In "No Good Reason", Sheila brings Benson to family court, accusing her of being an unfit parent; the case is dismissed, but Benson agrees that it's in Noah's best interest that they stop fighting. In "Unintended Consequences", Benson lets Porter visit and spend time with Noah. At the end of "Intent", Benson gets a call from Sheila telling her that Noah has been kidnapped in the mall. In "Gone Baby Gone", it is revealed that Sheila was behind the kidnapping, and that she intends to take Noah to live with her in Derry, New Hampshire. Benson goes to Sheila's cabin in Franconia, New Hampshire to rescue Noah. When Sheila attacks her, Benson subdues her, arrests her, and takes Noah home.

In the season 23 episode "Burning with Rage Forever", Noah tells her that he stood up to a bully who was picking on him and a non-binary classmate. Benson tells Noah she is proud of him for standing up for himself and his friend.

=== Relationships ===
==== Elliot Stabler ====
Benson's partnership with Elliot Stabler is a major focal point of her character. The relationship has gone through many stages that have been major plot points of both Law & Order: Special Victims Unit and Law & Order: Organized Crime.

Hargitay has characterized Benson and Stabler's relationship as "very complicated". Her assessment is that:

Sometimes it's very much like brother and sister, and I think the reason that they're so close is that they share a passion for their jobs and for the people. They have a mutual respect for one another. I think that the average lifespan of an SVU detective is four years because of the difficulty and stress involved. They've been doing it for longer than that, so they feel like they're in their own world almost. There's also sexual chemistry between them, it's so loaded and layered. People ask me if they'll ever get together—and people want that, and sometimes I think even Olivia wants that—but I don't think that will ever happen.

Baer agrees that a romantic relationship between the two is unlikely, though commented: "You never can say never".

Hargitay has stated that her favorite SVU scene occurs in the season 7 episode "Fault", when Benson is faced with the possibility of losing Stabler: "Lou Diamond Phillips [a murderous kidnapper] has a gun to Elliot's head. I'm negotiating [with him to drop the gun]. It was a painful, high-stakes scene. Elliot and I have to admit what we mean to each other... He is everything that [my character] Olivia has. So this was where we really got that to pay off." In an episode in which Stabler goes undercover to catch an animal-smuggling ring, Benson shows up at his house and tries to talk him out of it; when they are interrupted by Stabler's targets, she undresses and pretends to be a prostitute.

Benson takes it hard when Stabler resigns from SVU (offscreen) in the 13th season opener, "Scorched Earth", and takes a while to warm up to her new partner, Nick Amaro. Benson frequently mentions Stabler in both a professional and personal context; she tells the squad's newer detectives what Stabler would do in a given situation, and says more than once that she is "getting over someone". In the Season 22 episode "Return of the Prodigal Son", Benson and Stabler see each other again for the first time in 10 years when Stabler's wife Kathy (Isabel Gillies) is severely injured in a car bombing apparently meant for Stabler. Benson is forced to keep Stabler, who is now working in Rome in an organized crime task force, out of the investigation. They have a brief, quietly emotional conversation in which Benson tells him how hurt she was over the way he left SVU. When Kathy dies of her injuries, however, Benson puts her resentment aside to help her grieving friend get justice for his late wife.

Upon renewing her relationship with Stabler, Benson recognizes that he is suffering from post-traumatic stress disorder resulting from the bombing and Kathy's death. When she tries to talk to him about it, however, he becomes defensive and tells her to "back off". She ultimately joins Stabler's children in staging an intervention for him. He again rejects Benson's attempt to help him, but first blurts out that he loves her in front of his children.

==== Romantic relationships ====
In season 1, Benson has a drunken one-night stand with one of her SVU colleagues, Detective Brian Cassidy (Dean Winters). Comments in the episode "Disrobed" imply that the relationship continued. Cassidy leaves the precinct at the end of that episode. In the season 5 episode "Lowdown", it is revealed Benson had a relationship with a murder victim who turned out to be gay and HIV positive. Medical Examiner Melinda Warner (Tamara Tunie) immediately tests Benson and the results come back negative. In the season 9 episode "Closet", the SVU squad are surprised to find out that Benson has been in a relationship with journalist Kurt Moss (Bill Pullman) for several months. It comes out only because Internal Affairs is investigating Benson and Stabler in a case in which the department accidentally outed a professional football player. By the end of the episode, she breaks up with Moss.

While Benson has only been portrayed in relationships with men, she has, according to lesbian entertainment website AfterEllen.com, "attracted a large lesbian following". Fan speculation exists over alleged sexual tension between Benson and Assistant District Attorney Alexandra Cabot (Stephanie March), which Baer admits to indulging: "We read the fan sites. We know that people are into the Alex-Olivia thing. All the codes are in there." Though never shown to have any confirmed romance, it was noted by 2012 that Benson's relationship with Amanda Rollins could be seen as a potential lesbian romance.

In the middle of season 13, Benson enters into a relationship with a new prosecutor to the District Attorney's Office, Executive ADA David Haden (Harry Connick Jr.). Hargitay has said that Connick, who is a friend of hers, improved the show to a more romantic advanced stance. "This is a home run on so many levels," she said. "The show is very fortunate to have Harry's extraordinary talent, and I'm lucky because I get to work with my friend. I think Olivia couldn't have asked for a better companion to take her through a new stage in her life and career." Haden and Benson begin their relationship at the end of the episode, "Official Story". In the episode "Hunting Ground", she decides to take it slow with Haden, claiming she needs time to see if their relationship will last. That night, they end up sleeping together in her apartment. This makes her late for a case, which is frowned upon in the NYPD. In the episode "Justice Denied", Benson and Haden end their relationship due to a conflict of interest.

In the season 14 premiere, Benson shares a kiss with Cassidy after she tells him she is not the same person from 13 years before, when they had a brief sexual relationship. Later that season, in the episode "Undercover Blue", it is revealed that Cassidy and Benson had been seeing each other for quite some time. Their relationship hits a rough patch in the episode when Cassidy is accused of rape, which results in their relationship becoming public. The charges against Cassidy are later dropped when the SVU detectives discover that he was being set up. In season 15, Benson stays with Cassidy as she recovers from her imprisonment by a serial rapist. A few months after she returns to work, they get a new apartment together. They break up in the episode "Downloaded Child", however, upon realizing that they want different things. They nevertheless remain on good terms, especially after Benson gives him the courage to testify against Gary Dolan (William Sadler), the man who sexually abused him as a child.

In "Chicago Crossover" and "They'll Have to Go Through Me", Benson strikes up a friendship with Sergeant Hank Voight (Jason Beghe) of the Chicago Police Department, despite their differing methodologies when it comes to solving crime. Upon the conclusion of their joint operation, the two share drinks before Benson returns to New York.

It is suggested throughout season 17 that Benson is in a relationship with Capt. Ed Tucker (Robert John Burke) of Internal Affairs. In "Manhattan Transfer", they are forced to confirm their relationship when Tucker is accused – by his own cousin, a priest – of being complicit with a sex trafficking ring that has ties to Vice and the Catholic Church. Tucker is eventually cleared, and he continues his relationship with Benson. In season 18, Tucker tries to convince Benson to retire with him, though at the conclusion of the episode "Next Chapter", Benson realizes she is not ready to do so, as being a cop and a mother are parts of who she is. As a result, Benson breaks up with Tucker at the end of the episode "Chasing Theo". Even though their relationship does not work out, however, Benson is still saddened when Tucker commits suicide after being diagnosed with an inoperable brain tumor.

=== Sexual assault storylines ===
In the season 9 episode "Undercover", Benson poses as an inmate in a women's prison to investigate an alleged rape by a corrections officer. While there, the corrections officer in question, Captain Lowell Harris (Johnny Messner), attacks her and attempts to force her to perform oral sex on him. She is rescued by SVU colleague Fin Tutuola (Ice-T), who gets there just in time to stop Harris from raping her. Later, Benson helps convict Harris by questioning his earlier victim about distinguishing features on his penis, prompting the victim to recall a mole on it, which Benson later explains to medical examiner Melinda Warner (Tamara Tunie) that she had also seen. When Warner asks Benson if she had been raped, she replies, "It was the closest I've ever come."

In season 10, Benson is seen struggling with now being a victim of sexual assault herself. She is attending group therapy, something she has not shared with anyone but Tutuola. In the episode "PTSD," while investigating the rape and murder of a female Marine, she is pushed against a wall while trying to break up a fight between suspect Master Sergeant Dominic Pruitt (Ryan Kwanten) and Lieutenant Gary Rosten (Dominic Fumusa), who is eventually revealed to be the killer. She subsequently breaks up the fight by holding her weapon to the back of Pruitt's head. Later, as he is being interrogated, Rosten tells Tutuola that, "That broad [Benson] has PTSD, I would know that glassy-eyed look anywhere." At the end of the episode, after Rosten is imprisoned, Benson apologizes to Pruitt, admitting that she was a victim of sexual assault.

In the season 11 episode "Perverted", Benson becomes the prime suspect in the sexual mutilation and murder of a biker gang member. As more evidence is found linking her to the crime, an Internal Affairs detective insinuates that she may have committed it while suffering from a flashback to the assault. The other detectives eventually discover that Benson has been framed by Brady Harrison (Patrick Heusinger), a rapist she sent to prison years earlier.

==== William Lewis storyline ====
At the end of the season 14 finale "Her Negotiation", Benson is kidnapped by serial rapist/murderer William Lewis (Pablo Schreiber). During the season 15 premiere "Surrender Benson", Lewis makes her watch while he rapes and tortures the mother of his own attorney and kills a police officer who attempted to pull him over. He then holds her hostage for four days, burning her with cigarettes and wire hangers. Just as he is about to rape her, she breaks free, handcuffs him, and holds him at gunpoint. When he taunts her that she doesn't "have the balls" to kill him, she loses control and beats him within an inch of his life with an iron rod. She is rescued by her fellow detectives moments later, and Cragen puts her on mandatory leave so she can recover. She returns to work in the following episode, "Imprisoned Lives", which takes place two months later, but is still haunted by the experience. She begins seeing a therapist, Dr. Peter Lindstrom (Bill Irwin), to cope with the trauma. It is later revealed that Lewis survived and is in prison awaiting trial.

In "Psycho/Therapist", a visibly injured and still-recovering Lewis fires his new attorney and chooses to represent himself. He calls Benson as a witness and accuses her of assaulting him because he rejected her sexual advances. She vehemently denies it, and lies under oath that he had broken free of his restraints and lunged at her. Lewis is found guilty of kidnapping and assaulting a police officer, but the jury voices doubts about Benson's story and acquits him of attempted rape. The episode closes with Benson weeping on the courthouse stairs and, four months later, Lewis being wheeled away on a stretcher.

In "Beast's Obsession", Lewis uses the distraction caused by his (self-induced) cardiac incident to escape from prison, murdering an officer and raping a nurse in the process. He then rapes a teenage girl, kidnaps her younger sister, and threatens to kill her unless Benson tells the truth about her testimony. Benson holds a press conference and admits that she lied on the witness stand. When Lewis does not release the girl, Benson tracks him down and surrenders to him. With his hostage watching, Lewis at first attempts to rape Benson, but changes his mind when she refuses to show him fear; instead, he forces her to play Russian roulette with him. As a police squad closes in, Lewis shoots himself in the head right in front of her, while making it look like she killed him in cold blood. In "Post-Mortem Blues", she is brought before a grand jury to explain her admission and Lewis' death. Her career is threatened until SVU's temporary commanding officer, Lt. Declan Murphy (Donal Logue), tells the grand jury that he instructed Benson to lie in her press conference, thus clearing her of Lewis' death and possible perjury charges. Murphy then makes Benson his second-in-command up until his transfer to an undercover assignment.

In subsequent seasons, Lewis' name becomes a kind of code for an intensely dangerous situation, and Benson admits that her trauma and ordeal with him will always be a part of her. During a heated exchange with Amaro, he pointedly asks her whether she can ever forgive Lewis; she does not answer, and he apologizes.

=== Character development ===
Hargitay has deemed the storyline which saw Benson find her paternal family "probably the biggest thing that's ever happened to Olivia". She feels her character is a role model for teenage girls, revealing:

I get letters saying, 'I want to do the right thing like Olivia. I want to be strong like Olivia. My friend did this, but I didn't do it because of Olivia.' For me, when a television show has that kind of positive effect on young people, it is great. I think it is a good thing that we are shedding light on darkness. I think it is a good thing to make teenage girls aware.

== Service ==
Benson joined the NYPD in 1992, and was trained by Sergeant Karen Smythe (Khandi Alexander) at the 55th Precinct in the Bronx. After completing her probationary period, Smythe recommended that Benson be transferred to the Sex Crimes Unit (later renamed the Special Victims Unit) because of her talent for dealing with victims. From 1992 to May 1998, she was partnered with older officer Patrick Griffin (Anthony Edwards), who in 1992 testified on her behalf when she was accused of taking money and drugs during her first bust. However, he lied for her, as he had not actually been with her in the same room at the time.

By May 1998, she had received her detective's shield and was assigned to the 16th Precinct as a Detective 3rd Grade, and was partnered with Det. Elliot Stabler. She is promoted to Detective 2nd Grade in 2001, and Detective 1st Grade in 2011. In 2006, she is temporarily reassigned to the Computer Crimes Unit; later that year, she does a stint undercover for the FBI's Domestic Terrorism Unit at the request of her friend, Special Agent Dana Lewis (Marcia Gay Harden).

Benson and Stabler work together for over 12 years, until Stabler quits SVU in 2011 after he is forced to kill a 16-year-old girl who shot up the SVU squad room. Following Stabler's resignation, she is partnered with Det. Nick Amaro.

Cragen asks Benson to take the Sergeant's exam following the retirement of Sgt. John Munch (Richard Belzer), and she gets the promotion soon afterward; Cragen congratulates her for placing 48th out of 8,000 applicants. Cragen announces that Benson has been approved to remain at SVU (it was feared she would be reassigned); at the end of the episode, Cragen reveals his impending retirement from the NYPD, making Benson SVU's acting commanding officer. Benson remains in command until Lieutenant Declan Murphy (Donal Logue) takes over the squad; he makes her his second-in-command. When Murphy returns to undercover work, he appoints her acting commander.

Lt. Ed Tucker (Robert John Burke), representing 1 Police Plaza, asks Benson to take the Lieutenant's exam in order to officially take command of SVU before the NYPD appoints another officer to the position. She passes the Lieutenant's exam with flying colors, and is officially promoted to Lieutenant after some politicking by her boss, Deputy Chief William Dodds (Peter Gallagher). Benson had wanted Detective Fin Tutuola as her second-in-command, but Dodds arranges for the politically unsavvy Benson to be assigned a Sergeant who does know how to play the game – his own son, Mike (Andy Karl).

Following the events of "Manhattan Transfer", Benson is relieved of her duties as Commanding Officer of SVU, largely due to her (personal) involvement with now-Captain Tucker, who becomes a person of interest in a complex sex trafficking case SVU stumbled upon. Mike Dodds is made Acting Commanding Officer. In spite of this, Benson quietly continues to run SVU, as Dodds disagrees with her suspension and continues to seek her advice in secret. Benson is reinstated after SVU breaks up the sex trafficking ring and Tucker is cleared.

In "Heartfelt Passages", Benson and Mike Dodds, on the latter's last day at SVU, are involved in a hostage situation involving corrupt Rikers Island corrections officer Gary Munson (Brad Garrett) holding his wife hostage. Benson takes Munson's children out of the house and Dodds tried to resolve the situation, but Munson shoots Dodds while the latter is trying to take his weapon. Dodds suffers a stroke after surgery and dies. Benson blames herself for Dodds' death because she did not initially search Munson for a weapon.

Benson is promoted to captain in the episode "I'm Going to Make You a Star", Deputy Chief Dodds' final official act before he is transferred to Staten Island.

As commanding officer, Benson has worked cases frequently with each of the detectives under her command: Tutuola, Amanda Rollins (Kelli Giddish) and Joe Velasco (Octavio Pisano) as of 2021.

Benson is forced to kill a suspect on four separate occasions during her tenure on the show: in season 1's "Disrobed", she shoots and kills domestic abuser Roger Silver (Jack Gwaltney) in self-defense during a hostage situation; in season 3's "Wrath", serial killer Eric Plummer (Justin Kirk) commits suicide by cop by attacking a woman and forcing Benson to shoot him; in season 18's "Next Chapter", she shoots and kills rapist (and retired corrections officer) Tom Cole (Chris Bauer) during a hostage situation when Cole attacks her SVU colleague Detective Dominick "Sonny" Carisi Jr. (Peter Scanavino); and in season 23's "Silent Night, Hateful Night", she shoots and kills white supremacist Robert Paul Byers (Michael Laurence) to stop him from detonating a bomb in Washington Square Park. In the Law & Order: Organized Crime episode "With Many Names", she shoots and kills an assassin hired by Kyle Wilkie (Winter Andrews), the mastermind of the "revenge rape" website Shadowërk, to kill her and Stabler. Also, in "Rage", a season 6 episode of SVU, she shoots and wounds serial killer Gordon Rickett (Matthew Modine) to prevent Stabler from killing him in cold blood. She has also been stalked by several of the rapists and child molesters she has investigated over the years, which complicates her role as a mother after she adopts Noah.

== List of assignments ==
- Patrol Officer, NYPD 55th Precinct (1992) 16th Precinct (1993)
- Junior Detective, NYPD 16th Precinct (Special Victims Unit) (May 1998 – May 18, 2011)
- Senior Detective, NYPD 16th Precinct (Special Victims Unit) (September 21, 2011 – January 15, 2014)
- Acting Commanding Officer (Sergeant), NYPD 16th Precinct (Special Victims Unit) (January 22, 2014 – April 9, 2014)
- Sergeant—Supervisor Detective Squad, NYPD 16th Precinct (Special Victims Unit) (April 9, 2014 – May 21, 2014)
- Acting Commanding Officer (Sergeant), NYPD 16th Precinct (Special Victims Unit) (May 21, 2014 – October 7, 2015)
- Lieutenant—Commander Detective Squad, NYPD 16th Precinct (Special Victims Unit) (October 7, 2015 – September 26, 2019)
- Captain, Commanding Officer, NYPD 16th Precinct (Special Victims Unit) (September 26, 2019 – present)

=== Temporary assignments ===
- Detective, NYPD Computer Crimes Unit (May 2, 2006 – May 9, 2006)
- Undercover operative, FBI Domestic Terrorism Unit (September 19, 2006 – October 31, 2006)
- Special Deputy United States Marshal for the Eastern District of New York (October 6, 2010)
- Public Relations Officer, NYPD One Police Plaza (Public Relations) (March 2, 2016 – March 23, 2016)

=== Ranks ===
- Officer
- Detective 3rd Grade
- Detective 2nd Grade
- Detective 1st Grade (Shield number 40115)
- Sergeant (Shield number 01139)
- Lieutenant
- Captain

=== Partners ===
- Sergeant Karen Smythe, NYPD (Khandi Alexander) – Training officer (1992–1993)
- Detective Patrick Griffin, NYPD (Anthony Edwards) – First partner (1993–98)
- Detective Elliot Stabler, NYPD Special Victims Unit (Christopher Meloni) (1998–2011)
- Detective Nick Amaro, NYPD Special Victims Unit (Danny Pino) (2011–2014)
- None (Squad Supervisor) (2014–15)
- None (Commanding Officer) (2015–present)

=== Awards and decorations ===
==== As a sergeant ====
The following are the medals and service awards worn by then-Sergeant Benson, as seen in "Betrayal's Climax" and "Beast's Obsession".

American Flag Breast Bar
World Trade Center Breast Bar
NYPD Commendation—Integrity

==== As a lieutenant ====
The following are the medals and service awards worn by then-Lieutenant Benson, as seen in "Heartfelt Passages".

American Flag Breast Bar
World Trade Center Breast Bar
NYPD Combat Cross
NYPD Medal for Valor
NYPD Meritorious Police Duty, w/numeral "2"
NYPD Meritorious Police Duty

== Development and casting ==
Casting for the lead characters on Law & Order: Special Victims Unit occurred in spring 1999. Dick Wolf, along with officials from NBC and Studios USA, were at the final auditions for the two leads at Rockefeller Center. The last round had been narrowed down to six finalists. For the female lead – Benson – Samantha Mathis, Reiko Aylesworth, and Hargitay were being considered. For the male role – Stabler – the finalists were Tim Matheson, John Slattery, and Christopher Meloni. Meloni and Hargitay had auditioned in the final round together and after the actors left, there was a moment of dead silence, after which Wolf blurted out, "Oh well. There's no doubt who we should choose – Hargitay and Meloni." The duo, who Wolf believed had the perfect chemistry from the first time he saw them together, were his first choice. Garth Ancier, then head of NBC Entertainment, agreed, and the rest of the panel assembled voiced their assent. Hargitay trained as a rape crisis advocate to prepare for the role of Benson.

During the last months of her pregnancy in 2006, Hargitay took maternity leave from SVU, and was temporarily replaced by Connie Nielsen.

In May 2009, after the show's tenth season, Hargitay and Meloni's contracts expired when they were reportedly making $375,000–$385,000 per episode. During negotiations in April for a new contract, the duo attempted to receive a percentage of the show's profits as other high-profile Law & Order actors had done in the past. It was rumored that NBC threatened to replace Hargitay and Meloni if they persisted in their demands. However, two months later it was officially reported that both their contracts had been renewed for two more years. When the thirteenth season was about to air, initial reports indicated that Hargitay would appear in only the first 13 episodes. However, NBC chairman Bob Greenblatt later clarified that she would be in every episode of the season.

Since 2012, Hargitay earns approximately $400,000 to $500,000 per episode.

== Reception ==
Hargitay has won a number of awards for her role as Benson: 'Individual Achievement for Best Female Lead' and 'Outstanding Female Lead' Gracie Awards in 2004 and 2009 respectively, an Emmy for 'Outstanding Lead Actress in a Drama Series' in 2006, a Prism Award for 'Performance in a Drama Series Episode' in 2006, and a Golden Globe for 'Best Performance by an Actress in a Television Series' in 2005. Of her Emmy win, Hargitay commented: "It makes me only want to be better. Now I'm an Emmy winner. I have to step it up."

The San Francisco Chronicle's John Carman called Hargitay "the show's weakest performer" when the series originally premiered in 1999. In 2006, however, fellow San Francisco Chronicle writer Jean Gonick deemed Benson a suitable role model for teenage girls, calling her "courageous and strong, and unspeakably gorgeous", and writing that "Olivia Benson is our own special hero. She battles evil, avenges her mother, faces her demons but refuses to date them." In 2001, Entertainment Weekly's Ken Tucker criticized Benson and Stabler as "the most naive, bleeding heart molester busters in America."

A poll on the Hallmark Channel voted her second-greatest detective in the Law & Order franchise, only being beaten by Law & Order: Criminal Intent's Robert Goren (Vincent D'Onofrio). Benson appeared in Comcast's list of TV's Most Intriguing Characters and also in the website's list of TV's Top Cops. She was included in TV Guide's list of "TV's Sexiest Crime Fighters". UGO Networks placed "the hard-charging detective" among the "fifty greatest fictional detectives of all time". A 2015 poll released by Trailer Park, Inc. in conjunction with QC Strategy ranked Benson as the No. 1 "favourite female television character".

== Appearances on other shows ==
Benson appears on eight episodes of Law & Order, one episode of Law & Order: Trial by Jury, three episodes of Chicago P.D. and one episode of Chicago Fire.

- Law & Order: "Entitled: Part 2" (February 18, 2000)
- Law & Order: "Fools for Love" (February 23, 2000)
- Law & Order: Trial by Jury: "Day" (May 3, 2005)
- Law & Order: "Flaw" (September 28, 2005)
- Chicago P.D.: "They'll Have to Go Through Me" (November 12, 2014)
- Chicago Fire: "We Called Her Jellybean" (April 28, 2015)
- Chicago P.D.: "The Number of Rats" (April 29, 2015)
- Chicago P.D.: "The Song of Gregory William Yates" (February 10, 2016)
- Law & Order: "Black and Blue" (May 19, 2022)
- Law & Order: "Gimme Shelter – Part Three" (September 22, 2022)
- Law & Order: "The Perfect Man" (October 10, 2024)
- Law & Order: "Play with Fire Part 1" (April 17, 2025)
- Law & Order: "Snowflakes" (January 8, 2026)

=== Law & Order: Organized Crime ===
Further, Benson appeared recurringly as a special guest in fourteen episodes of the spin-off Law & Order: Organized Crime:

- "What Happens in Puglia" (April 1, 2021)
- "Not Your Father's Organized Crime" (April 8, 2021)
- "The Stuff That Dreams Are Made Of" (April 22, 2021)
- "An Inferior Product" (May 13, 2021)
- "Forget It Jake; It's Chinatown" (June 3, 2021)
- "The Outlaw Eddie Wagner" (September 30, 2021)
- "The Good, The Bad, and The Lovely" (October 14, 2021)
- "The Christmas Episode" (December 9, 2021)
- "Takeover" (March 10, 2022)
- "Lost One" (May 5, 2022)
- "Gimme Shelter – Part One" (September 22, 2022)
- "Shadowërk" (May 11, 2023)
- "With Many Names" (May 18, 2023)
- "Dante's Inferno" (April 17, 2025)
