= Dann Florek =

American actor and film director (born 1950)

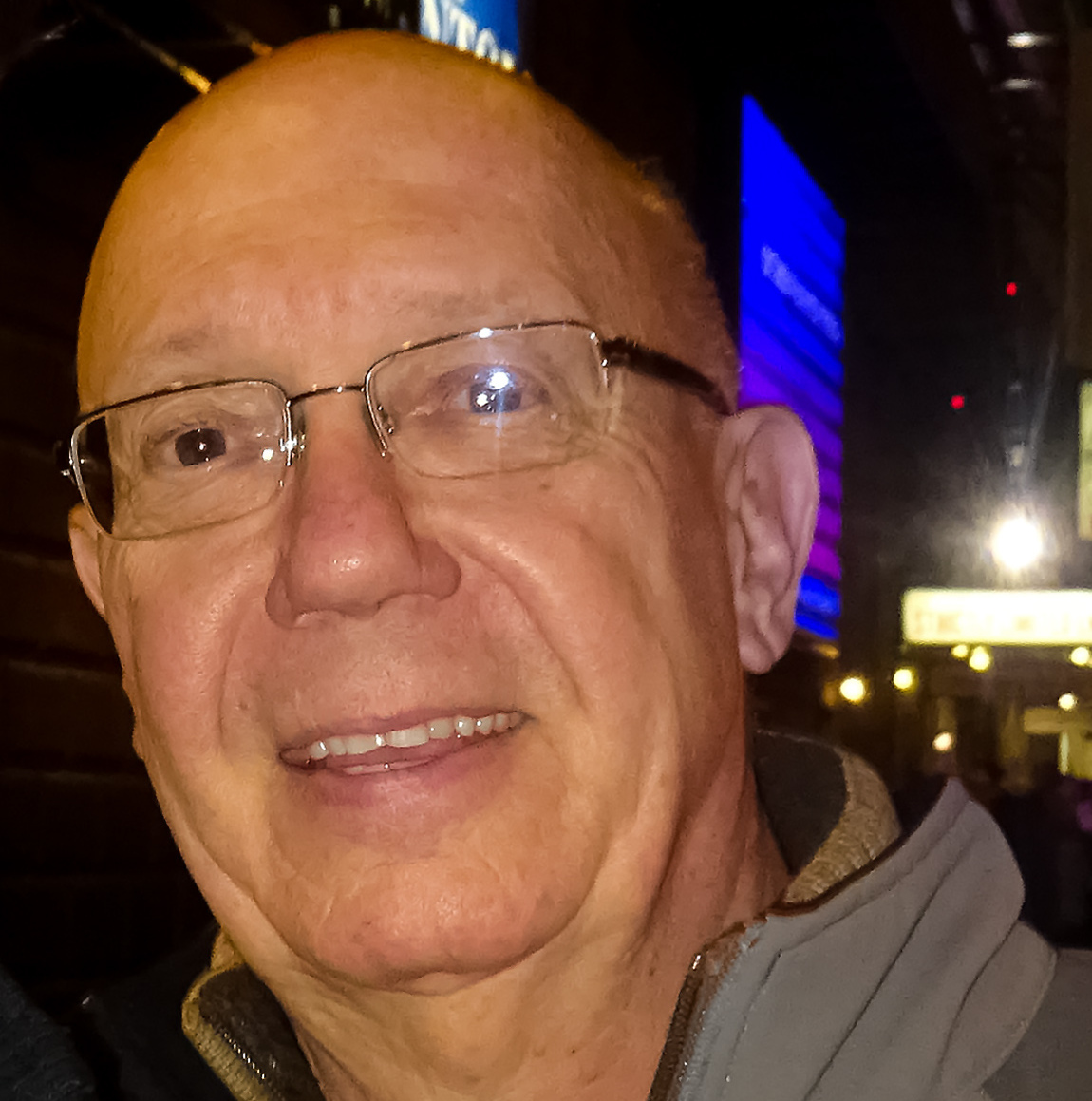
- Florek in November 2016 in New York City
- Born: Ezekial Dann Florek; May 1, 1950 (age 76); Flat Rock, Michigan, U.S.
- Other name: Dan Florek
- Occupations: Actor; film director
- Years active: 1982–present
- Spouse: Karen Florek (m. 1980)

Ezekial Dann Florek (born May 1, 1950) is an American actor and film director. He is best known for his role as New York City Police Captain Donald Cragen on NBC's Law & Order and its spinoff Law & Order: Special Victims Unit, and Dave Meyer on L.A. Law (1988–1993).

== Early life ==
Florek was born in Flat Rock, Michigan, the son of Leonard Florek, a chiropractor, and Darlene Florek. He attended Eastern Michigan University where he majored in math and physics, but never graduated. He moved to New York City to pursue an acting career in the theatre.

== Career ==
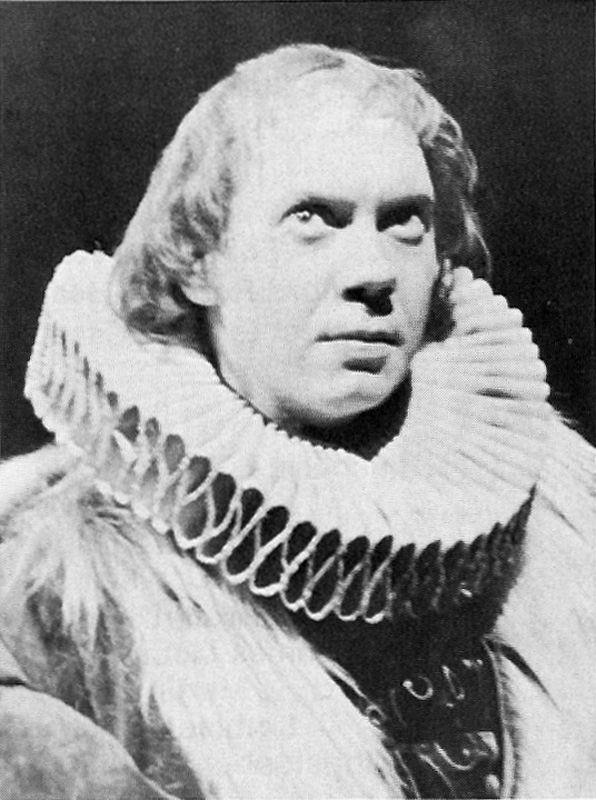
Florek in 1969

In the 1980s, Florek performed supporting roles in films such as Sweet Liberty, Moon Over Parador and Angel Heart. He also played Mr. Slate in the live-action film version of The Flintstones.

Florek played Dave Meyer, the husband of Susan Ruttan's character, Roxanne Melman, on 22 episodes of NBC's hit drama L.A. Law beginning in 1988. Florek also had a recurring role in the WB sitcom Smart Guy as the high school gym coach, and appeared in several episodes of Roseanne.

=== Law & Order ===
Starting in 1990, Florek co-starred in the NBC police procedural and legal drama television series Law & Order as Capt. Don Cragen.

The first few years of Law & Order had mediocre ratings and finally, after the close of the 1992–1993 season, NBC told creator/executive producer Dick Wolf that they would cancel it unless he added a few women to the all-male cast. Wolf reluctantly complied and fired Florek as well as Richard Brooks (who played Paul Robinette), replacing them with S. Epatha Merkerson and Jill Hennessy, respectively. However, Florek was allowed to direct a few Law & Order episodes in 1994 and 1995.

Florek reprised the role of Cragen in the 1995 episode "Bad Faith" (which he also directed), and in the 1998 TV-movie Exiled: A Law & Order Movie, centered on the character Mike Logan, played by Chris Noth.

=== Law & Order: Special Victims Unit ===
In 1999, he returned to the Cragen role, only this time on the Law & Order spin-off series Law & Order: Special Victims Unit, as the titular unit's captain. For the return of the Cragen character, Florek and Wolf created a backstory in which his wife, a flight attendant, was killed in a plane crash a few years previously, which drove Cragen, a recovering alcoholic, to start drinking again and to patronize prostitutes; he takes command of the Special Victims Unit in order to escape his addiction.

Florek was written out of the series during its 15th season, and his final episode aired on January 15, 2014. He reprised his role in the 21st episode of season 16 in May 2015. In the 500th episode of SVU, he appeared as Cragen in a video chat with his former detective Olivia Benson (Mariska Hargitay), now captain of the unit. He also reprised the role of Cragen in an episode of the SVU spin-off Law & Order: Organized Crime, reuniting Cragen with his former detective Elliot Stabler (Christopher Meloni) in April 2022. He subsequently appeared in the second season finale. It is revealed at the beginning of Season 27 of Law & Order: Special Victims Unit that the character has died.

== Personal life ==
Florek and his wife, Karen, live in Venice, Los Angeles. Karen works as an artist. His brother, Dave, is also an actor. All three trained at Eastern Michigan University.

Florek received an honorary Bachelor of Arts and an honorary Doctorate of Arts, on December 13, 2008, and December 14, 2008, respectively, from Eastern Michigan University at the school's winter commencement ceremony. Florek was the keynote speaker at the event.

== Filmography ==
=== Film ===
Year	Title	Role	Notes
1983	Eddie Macon's Run	Man in bar	
1986	Sweet Liberty	Jesse	
1987	Angel Heart	Herman Winesap	
1987	Five Corners	Policeman	
1988	Sunset	Marty Goldberg	
1988	Moon over Parador	Toby	
1989	An Innocent Man	Prosecuting Attorney	Uncredited
1991	Flight of the Intruder	Lt. Cmdr. Mad Jack	
1994	The Flintstones	Mr. Slate	
1994	Getting Even with Dad	Wayne	
1998	Hard Rain	Mr. Mehlor	
2000	Beautiful Joe	Happy	
2002	Law & Order: The Beginning	Himself	Short
2003	Focus Room	William	Short
2003	SVU Beginning	Himself	Short
2004	Law & Order: The First 3 Years	Himself	Short
2004	Law & Order: Special Victims Unit, Police Sketch: Dann Florek	Himself	Short
2005	Jerry Orbach Tribute	Himself	Short
2006	Copy That	Dann	Short
2011	Run Your Mouth	Detective	Short
2013	Santorini Blue	Trent Parker	
2023	Crater	Older Dylan	
2026	Chili Finger	Carl	

=== Television ===
Year	Title	Role	Notes
1982	The Country Girl	Larry	TV movie
1985	Hill Street Blues	Bowers	Episode: "Intestinal Fortitude"
1985	Braker	Hayes	TV movie
1986	The Equalizer	Lieutenant Ferraro	Episode: "Breakpoint"
1986	Alex: The Life of a Child	Dr. Tom Dolan	TV movie
1987	Mr. President	Bosdec	Episode: "Armageddon Kinda Sore"
1987	CBS Summer Playhouse	Winthrop	Episode: "Doctors Wilde"
1987	Hunter	John Edleton	Episode: "Night on Bald Mountain"
1988–1993	L.A. Law	Dave Meyer	22 episodes
1988	American Playhouse	Judge Crane	Episode: "The Trial of Bernhard Goetz"
1988	Matlock	Ken Pritchard	Episode: "The Hucksters"
1988	Beverly Hills Buntz	Joe Volker	Episode: "Buntz of the Desert"
1988	21 Jump Street	Jim Crawford	Episode: "Brother Hanson & the Miracle of Renner's Pond"
1988	CBS Schoolbreak Special	Stan Pallon	Episode: "Gambler"
1988	Almost Grown	Giardello	Episode: "Ghost Town
1989	Free Spirit	Bill / Mr. Flynn	Episode: "The Bosses Are Coming"
1989	Major Dad	Buzz	Episode: "Rescue Mission"
1989	The Edge	Paulie	Episode: "Professional Man"
1990	Grand	Robert	Episode: "The Healing"
1990, 1997	Roseanne	Dr. Rudmen / Principal Hiller	3 episodes
1990–2004	Law & Order	Captain Donald Cragen	Main role (seasons 1–3); guest role (seasons 5, 10, 15)
1994	Hardball	Ernest 'Happy' Talbot	9 episodes
1994	Wings	Bob (air traffic controller)	Episode: "Insanity Claus"
1995	Ellen	Mr. Woodruff	Episode: "$5,000"
1995	The John Larroquette Show	Winters Lennox	Episode: "Love on the Line"
1996	Champs	Ernie	Episode: "It's Must Have Been Gridlock"
1997	Michael Hayes	Carnap	Episode: "The Confidence Man"
1997	Sabrina, the Teenage Witch	Bob Gordon	Episode: "Cat Showdown"
1997	Total Security	Morris Silver	Episode: "Dental Men Prefer Blondes"
1997	NYPD Blue	Gary Hogan	Episode: "Sheedy Dealings"
1997	A Nightmare Come True	Det. Ron Shaye	TV movie
1997–1999	Smart Guy	Coach Gerber	6 episodes
1998	The Pretender	Don Larson	Episode: "Crash"
1998	From the Earth to the Moon	Robert Seamans	2 episodes
1998	The Practice	Father Michael Ryan	Episode: "Duty Bound"
1998	The Secret Diary of Desmond Pfeiffer	Abraham Lincoln	6 episodes
1998	Little Girl Fly Away	Chief Gelbart	TV movie
1998	The Pentagon Wars	Maj. Gen. Bob Braden	TV movie
1998	Exiled: A Law & Order Movie	Captain Donald Cragen	TV movie
1999–2025	Law & Order: Special Victims Unit	Captain Donald Cragen	Main role (seasons 1–15); guest role (seasons 16, 23, 27)
2000	Strange World	Det. Walter Nash	Episode: "Age of Reason"
2002	L.A. Law: The Movie	Dave Meyer	TV movie
2014	Captain Blackout	Jimmy Black	TV movie
2015	Under the Dome	Colonel Walker	Episode: "The Enemy Within"
2018	Disillusioned	Jeb	TV movie
2022–2024	Law & Order: Organized Crime	Donald Cragen	4 episodes
2026	The Pitt	Eddie Cohen	Episode: Season 2, "6:00 P.M."
