= Special victims unit =

Unit within some police departments

A special victims unit (SVU), also known as a special victims division or sex crimes unit, is a specialized unit within some law enforcement agencies, typically police departments. These units investigate cases involving vulnerable or high-risk victims. Detectives assigned to an SVU typically investigate sexual offenses and other crimes requiring sensitive handling, such as those involving children, the elderly, or people with disabilities. Because of the sensitive nature of these investigations, SVU detectives often receive specialized training in forensic interviewing, crisis intervention, and victim advocacy.

== United States ==
=== New York City ===
The New York City Police Department's Special Victims Unit, the Special Victims Division, investigates sex crimes. It is housed in separate Borough Patrols (Manhattan, the Bronx, Queens, Staten Island and Brooklyn). The Special Victims Division only investigates the following types of cases:

- All children under 11 years of age who are the victim of abuse by a parent or person legally responsible for the care of the child.
- All children under 13 years of age who are the victim of a sex crime or attempted sex crime.
- All victims of rape or attempted rape.
- All victims of a criminal sexual act or attempted criminal sexual act.
- Victims of aggravated sexual abuse.
- Victims of sexual abuse 1st degree.

They also deal with children, disabled and elderly victims of non-sexual crimes who require special handling. The Special Victims Division does not investigate murder or child sexual exploitation material cases. Murders are investigated by the precinct detective squad in which the murder was committed and/or the borough homicide squad. Child sexual exploitation material cases are investigated by various computer crime squads and task forces. Robberies are investigated by precinct detective squads and/or borough robbery squads. If a sex crime is involved, the Special Victims Division may assist in the investigation.

In June 2022, the Justice Department announced a federal investigation into the division's "deficiencies", including “failing to conduct basic investigative steps and instead shaming and abusing survivors and re-traumatizing them during investigations.”

== In popular culture ==
The American television show Law & Order: Special Victims Unit, the first spin-off in the Law & Order franchise, follows the cases of a fictional NYPD SVU division. Another American television show Homicide: Life on the Street makes references to the Sex Crimes Unit, another name for Special Victims Unit.

== See also ==
- Rape
- Laws regarding rape
- Rape shield law (shields rape victims from scrutiny)
- Serial rapist
- Major case squad
- Cold case
- Missing Persons Unit
