= Law & Order: Special Victims Unit season 26 =

Season of American television series

Law & Order: Special Victims Unit
- Season 26
- Promotional poster
- Starring: Mariska Hargitay; Ice-T; Peter Scanavino; Octavio Pisano; Kevin Kane; Juliana Aidén Martinez
- No. of episodes: 22

Release
- Original network: NBC
- Original release: October 3, 2024 – May 15, 2025

Season chronology
- ← Previous; Season 25 Next → Season 27

The twenty-sixth season of Law & Order: Special Victims Unit, an American police crime drama television series created by Dick Wolf, was ordered on March 21, 2024, by NBC alongside the twenty-fourth season of Law & Order, and is produced by Wolf Entertainment. It premiered on October 3, 2024 and concluded on May 15, 2025. It consisted of 22 episodes. This is the third and final season of David Graziano as showrunner. Kevin Kane was promoted to a series regular after appearing in a recurring capacity in the previous two seasons, Juliana Aidén Martinez joined the main cast beginning with the season premiere.

On May 6, 2025, it was reported this would be Octavio Pisano's last season as a regular, leaving after four seasons, however he did reprise his role in the following season, retaining his series regular status. It was also announced this would be Martinez's only season as a regular.

== Cast and characters ==
=== Main ===
- Mariska Hargitay as Captain Olivia Benson
- Ice-T as Sergeant Odafin "Fin" Tutuola
- Peter Scanavino as Assistant District Attorney Dominick "Sonny" Carisi, Jr.
- Octavio Pisano as Detective Joe Velasco
- Kevin Kane as Detective Terry Bruno
- Juliana Aidén Martinez as Junior Detective Kate Silva

=== Special guest stars after their departure ===
- Kelli Giddish as Sergeant Amanda Rollins (episodes 3, 8, 9, 17, 20)

=== Crossover stars from Law & Order ===
- Zak Orth as Defense Attorney Harry Kagan
- Tony Goldwyn as District Attorney Nicholas Baxter
- Maura Tierney as Lieutenant Jessica Brady
- Hugh Dancy as Assistant District Attorney Nolan Price

=== Crossover stars from Law & Order: Organized Crime ===
- Christopher Meloni as Detective Elliot Stabler

=== Recurring ===
- Elizabeth Alderfer as Kelsey Sommers
- Erin Anderson as Defense Attorney April Andrews
- Paul Bomba as Officer Bobby Nardone
- Stephen C. Bradbury as Judge Colin McNamara
- Ryan Buggle as Noah Porter-Benson
- Charlotte Cabell as Jesse Rollins
- Brian Cade as Defense Attorney Harris Malone
- Miguel Cervantes as Timothy Cottle
- Josh Cooke as Agent Harrison Clay
- Gina Costigan as Virginia Becker
- Steve Filice as COD Mark Barone
- Christine Toy Johnson as Dr. Celia Lee
- Aimé Donna Kelly as Captain Renee Curry
- Graham Patrick Martin as Chris Becker
- Edie Salas Miller as Officer Tiffany Gómez
- Jama Williamson as Laura Hughes

=== Guests stars ===
- Zach Appelman as Michael Strickland
- David Alan Basche as Frank Bailey
- Johanna Braddy as Maggie Andrews
- Brett Cullen as Judge Leonard Andrews
- Kelly Frye as Sharon Hayward
- Troy Garity as Josh Blake
- Amy Landecker as Katharine Vernon
- Michael Mastro as Arraignment Judge D. Serani
- Allison McAtee as Paula Blake
- Michael McGrady as Jim Hogan
- Silas Weir Mitchell as Boyd Lynch
- Roman Mitichyan as Zef Sokoli
- Mark Moses as Defense Attorney Jan Green
- Leland Orser as Harris Vernon
- Erin Quill as Dr. Adrienne Wright
- Michael Shapiro as Dr. Isaac Haimes
- John Clarence Stewart as Detective Vince Corgan
- Pawel Szajda as Alex Neziri
- Jessica Tuck as Lillian Andrews
- Olga Merediz as Judge Roberta Martinez
- Elizabeth Marvel as Defense Attorney Rita Calhoun

== Episodes ==
Law & Order: Special Victims Unit season 26 episodes
No. overall	No. in season	Title	Directed by	Written by	Original release date	Prod. code	U.S. viewers (millions)
552	1	"Fractured"	Norberto Barba	David Graziano & Julie Martin	October 3, 2024	2601	3.81
The squad is called to an off-campus dorm and the scene of a brutal attack on a trio of law students: Shelli Henson, beaten to death with a hammer; Damon Reynolds, in a coma with head trauma; Elodie Whitfield, raped and traumatized. A hidden camera recorded their threesome, but not the attack. The immediate suspect is their roommate Teddy Hall, but they also locate Sam Ellis who installed the camera. More evidence, a private video testimonial, is found at Rise and Radiate, a women's empowerment group. Carisi's tries catching the defendant in a lie to ensure a conviction. Cast: First appearance of Juliana Aidén Martinez as Detective Kate Silva.
553	2	"Excavation"	Juan J. Campanella	Teleplay by : Kathy Dobie; Story by : David Graziano & Julie Martin	October 10, 2024	2602	3.77
While helping her family to clean out her childhood home, Maggie Andrews finds an old notebook that triggers devastating repressed memories from when she was only eight years old, about her step-father, retired federal Judge Leonard Andrews. The squad investigates, but the judge claims he was only trying his hand at writing a fiction novel. Maggie's mother, Dr. Lillian Andrews, supports his side of the story and everyone knows Maggie is an alcoholic, unstable in her work and social life. Given the decades-old crime, bringing charges is even more difficult for Carisi when the judge lawyers up.
554	3	"Divide and Conquer"	Martha Mitchell	David Graziano & Julie Martin	October 17, 2024	2604	3.19
Sergeant Rollins gives a briefing for the Intelligence Division with her new partner, Det. Vince Corgan, on a four-man "crime tourist" robbery crew from Albania. Meanwhile, that same team is hitting the home of wealthy gym chain owner, James Fletcher. They shoot him, rape his wife Nora while he and two friends watch helplessly, and the crew make off with 10 million in gold. Rollins' Intelligence squad, and Benson's SVU squad "divide and conquer" to bring down the crew and find who hired them. A suspect is found, and Benson tries to help Nora deal with the trauma.
555	4	"Constricted"	Michael Smith	Teleplay by : Candice Sanchez McFarlane; Story by : David Graziano & Julie Martin	October 24, 2024	2603	3.44
Sixteen year-old first-timers, Hannah Brolin and Ryan Blake have a romantic date ending at her home with the blessing of her mom Allison (Rosie Benton), but Hannah winds up in the hospital with choke marks and a concussion. The SVU investigate how it turned so ugly so fast, and who is ultimately responsible. When two thirteen year-old boys attempt a choking rape of twelve year-old Eliza Quinn, she is hit by cab trying to escape. One of the boys is Ryan's cousin, who claims Ryan show them choke-porn provided by Ryan's father, Josh. Now armed with causation, Carisi pursues charges. Carisi asks Benson for advice concerning his own two growing daughters.
556	5	"Economics of Shame"	Jean de Segonzac	Teleplay by : Brendan Feeney; Story by : David Graziano & Julie Martin	October 31, 2024	2605	3.52
TV reporter Kelsey Sommers goes on her first date in a year after her engagement imploded, but she falls victim to a sextortion ring and fears it will end her career. Benson helps talk her down from a ledge, and urges her take back control. The SVU uncovers more victims of the ring, and Velasco goes undercover, posing as a rich venture capitalist from Mexico City in order to work their way up to the ring leaders. Benson has an idea to help Kelsey reclaim control.
557	6	"Rorschach"	Oscar René Lozoya II	Teleplay by : Nicholas Evangelista; Story by : David Graziano & Julie Martin	November 7, 2024	2606	3.13
FBI Agent Harrison "Clark Kent" Clay visits the SVU for help on a case that involves a couple of Los Angeles travel influencers and an apparent rape at a remote campground in Rockland County off the Appalachian Trail that straddles fourteen states. Ellie Hughes was found half naked and bludgeoned with a rock, and Chris Becker was stabbed near his heart. Because of Silva's past experience in the Homicide Division, Benson sends her out to the scene, accompanied by Velasco who challenges her instincts. The squad begin to question the difference between the couple's online and off-line personas after Silva does an NCIC search that reveals they were pulled over in Georgia. Fin and Velasco talk to State Trooper Jonah Nelson who reveals their body cam footage of the stop. Silva and Bruno comb their online footage to unravel what actually happened. Chris' mom Virginia Becker does everything she can to block the investigation and protect her son. Bruno asks Silva what prompted her to move from Homicide to the SVU.
558	7	"Tenfold"	Jonathan Herron	Teleplay by : Gabriel Vallejo; Story by : David Graziano & Julie Martin	November 14, 2024	2607	3.32
Wallen Sipes (from Season 24's "Blood Out") uses the card given to her by Det. Bruno to call the SVU after being attacked and raped. Fin and Bruno respond to track down a serial rapist. Carisi tries to stop a pedophile from a sex crime before it is committed by enlisting Benson's help to investigate a substitute elementary school teacher, Timothy Cottle (after the events in "Constricted").
559	8	"Cornered"	Juan J. Campanella	David Graziano & Julie Martin	November 21, 2024	2608	4.23
Carisi and three civilians — Tess Milburn, Elizabeth Alden, and store clerk Ali Imran — are cornered in a bodega by recently released convict Boyd Lynch and his accomplice, Deonte Mosley. Benson, wondering why Carisi is running late, checks the bodega and a hostage situation ensues. Carisi tries to protect the hostages, but Boyd is beyond reason, so Carisi tries to persuade Mosley. Rollins arrives on the scene, and Benson tries a risky plan.
560	9	"First Light"	Norberto Barba	David Graziano & Julie Martin	January 16, 2025	2609	4.55
English professor Harris Vernon and his wife Katharine start the day in good spirits until they find the word "WHORE" spray-painted on their garage door. When Katharine receives a video of her having sex with a stranger, of which she has no recollection, they contact the SVU to report a rape. Lies and betrayal are uncovered from an online forum for married couples who've stopped having sex called Roommate Syndrome. Carisi asks Rollins to have her authorship attribution specialist analyze the handwriting characteristics (grammar, syntax, punctuation) to determine who invited a stranger into Katharine's bed. Carisi struggles with PTSD from the bodega incident, and Benson helps him wake up and get back to the job at hand.
561	10	"Master Key"	Norberto Barba	Teleplay by : Nicholas Evangelista; Story by : David Graziano & Julie Martin	January 23, 2025	2610	4.76
When sixteen year-old Anthony Reed goes missing from the West Harlem Boys' Home, the squad tries to deduce if he ran away or was abducted. An Amber Alert is issued, and the trail leads to a hotel where a locksmith named Colin Clark is found shot to death. Anthony is found holding the gun and the SVU try to get to the truth despite Anthony's string of lies. They talk to the group home director Aurora Miller and Anthony's CPS case worker Michael Strickland, while TARU digs through phone and internet records. The truth about the failure of the system is soon revealed.
562	11	"Deductible"	Oscar René Lozoya II	Kathy Dobie	January 30, 2025	2611	3.94
When his sister Kyra doesn't come home from work, nine year-old Jay Thompson contacts the 11th precinct which refers him to the SVU. Kyra is found at Mercy hospital after a sexual assault by Jim Hogan, CEO of commuter helicopter business Helivate, seemingly arranged as a "closing gift" by Frank Bailey of AmeriWatch liability. A systematic pattern of blackmail and coercion emerges. Carisi asks Benson and Tutuola to find any past victims, and a witness comes forward. When it looks as if Bailey's charges might be dismissed, Benson asks AmeriWatch COO Grace Callahan to do the right thing.
563	12	"Calculated"	Batán Silva	Teleplay by : Greg Contaldi; Story by : David Graziano & Julie Martin	February 13, 2025	2612	3.99
Headmaster Hobbs busts a Harrington Prep sixteen year-old student Eli Sanders for a girl's nude photo sent via a phone app Ghost Letter. Benson and Silva interview Eli and sends his phones to TARU. Silva and Bruno interview Sharon Hayward and her daughter Leah who says she never sent it to Eli, but instead to her fellow Ellsworth Academy student Oliver Banks. What began as a de minimis case, explodes into a major sting operation. TARU finds sixty Ghost Letter accounts, uncovering a distribution network involving hundreds of underage students. The SVU find a common denominator in college admissions advisor Adam Parker, who tries to make a plea deal but Carisi and Benson don't agree. Carisi wants to arrest fifty pedophiles to whom Parker sold the photos, but Benson wants to involve the FBI, and possibly even Interpol. Parker breaks, giving up the Wish Crafter app, and the SVU go to work arresting pedophiles. Silva, however, pleads for mercy for intellectually challenged Matthew Daly, whom she believes is innocent. Benson and Carisi go to Baxter with the request.
564	13	"Extinguished"	Heather Quick	Teleplay by : Gabriel Vallejo; Story by : David Graziano & Julie Martin	February 20, 2025	2613	3.84
Two high school teens are assaulted at knife-point and the girl is raped in Highbridge Park in Washington Heights, close to Velasco's building. Velasco and Bruno investigate, while Silva and Fin talk with the victims. Velasco's neighbor Danny Rocha, an overzealous security guard and aspiring cop, is jailed for assaulting a suspect with a baton. Velasco's community goes up-in-arms in protest with "Free Rocha" slogans. Fin tries to help Velasco to develop some community roots to deal with their anger. The suspect is cleared. Velasco frees Rocha and they team up to canvas the neighborhood. A second attempted rape is reported soon afterwards.
565	14	"The Grid Plan"	Norberto Barba	David Graziano & Julie Martin	February 27, 2025	2614	3.81
Iowan tourist Megan Wallace is raped in a Times Square alcove by a businessman wheeling a suitcase, who doubled-back for a bottle. The SANE nurse mentions an underlying illness. She admits to not having told her husband Richard about her MS. Carly Simms tells Tutuola she saw what seemed like consensual, albeit outdoor public, sex. From video surveillance, Bruno and Silva find the bottle, and eventually a bartender who says a liquor representative tried selling a case. After acquiring video, they observe Megan canvassing with fliers to find him. Benson explains she is experiencing displacement, and warns, interfering in an investigation is illegal. Finding Gerard Ridley, Megan flirts until they arrive to arrest him, but she slugs him, forcing her arrest, which Benson voids. His DNA confirmed, Gerard claims it was consensual. Sonny is skeptical, but approves the charge. Ex-girlfriend Celia Fowler adds, her college complaint to the sexual misconduct board was dropped. At trial. Counselor Christine Vega questions Benson on Megan's arrest, and Judge Daniel LaPorte allows her MS questions, going to consent. While Carisi gets a recess, Benson encourages Megan to continue fighting, so Carisi can discredit Vega's strategy.
566	15	"Undertow"	Martha Mitchell	Brendan Feeney	March 13, 2025	2615	3.50
Twenty-eight year-old Stacey Moran celebrates her anniversary, but her husband Billy gets drunk. Angry, she goes to the hotel bar, where Ryan Perry drinks, and takes her to the pool. Finding panties in Ryan's tuxedo, stepmother Emily claims Stacey "pressured him into having sex...He's 16 years old." Without poolside video, their investigation becomes more difficult. Stacey swears, "I don't remember", claiming she blacked out. Billy counter-accuses that Stacey was raped. Billy's brother, Counselor Grant Moran, rejects Carisi's "misdemeanor sexual misconduct" plea since the mandatory registry entry would end her grade school teaching career. Grant orders a tox screen that reveals MDMA, which SVU finds in Ryan's belongings. Counselor Miranda Whitmer represents Ryan, who admits, "Stacey's not lying", claiming he added it to vodka for personal use, but she sipped it without permission. Stacey is charged with statutory rape, instead of Ryan being charged with date-rape. At trial, Grant shows Ryan's intent to have sex with any older woman from his father Frank's wedding party, using MDMA. But with Thomas D'Angelo's photo, showing them embracing, Carisi calls into question Stacey's assertion of being incapacitated. The he-said she-said presents a tough call from the jury.
567	16	"Let Me Bring Pardon"	Brenna Malloy	David Graziano & Julie Martin	March 20, 2025	2616	4.01
After events in "Rorschach", Ellie Hughes's mother Laura and Chris Becker's mother Virginia meet to discuss Ellie's complication during her coma. Laura exclaims, "I'm gonna be a grandmother." Dr. Shannon Darcy estimates fetus age at 16–18 weeks. Benson reasons, if Ellie was not impregnated by Becker, she was raped after hospitalization. Imprisoned for attempting to murder Ellie, represented by Counselor David Miller, Chris hopes "that judge who framed me" might grant early parole. Benson reminds Virginia of the cost of co-parenting with Laura. To establish paternity, Becker's counselor Anthony Sullivan and Ellie's, Emma Cartwright, argue positions. Judge Roberta Martinez grants the petition for fetal DNA testing, which proves Chris is not the father. Sheila Turner lists 115 trauma unit males during Ellie's month-long stay. Leaving during DNA testing, neurosurgery chief Dr. Isaac Haimes is suspected, but he recalls youth pastor Caleb Hartwell, who prayed over Ellie with Laura. Video confirms Hartwell entered her room and closed the blinds for fifteen minutes. Confronted, Hartwell resists DNA testing. Curry suggests arresting Hartwell for criminal trespassing to compel testing, which proves positive. Mid-sermon, Hartwell flees Bruno and Silva, but Curry and Tutuola collar him outside.
568	17	"Accomplice Liability"	Juan J. Campanella	David Graziano & Julie Martin	April 3, 2025	2617	3.36
After events in "Cornered", Brooklyn ADA Camille Rourke meets Deonte Mosley's defense Counselor Andre Vaughn, offering fifteen years for robbery and murder of deli clerk Ali Imran. Carisi protests, having witnessed Deonte "aid, encourage, and facilitate" an "avalanche" of felonies, including accomplice Boyd Lynch raping Tess Milburn. They find Tess through a laptop she stole from Elizabeth Alden, another victim. At her boyfriend Marquis Wallace's house, Tess survives overdosing. Dr. Sloane stabilizes her for fentanyl and benzos; Bruno volunteers to help Tess detox. Judge Stella McRae denies Vaughn's motion to exclude Carisi's testimony. Carisi advises Rourke to question Mosley about supplying guns, since Lynch had only just been released from prison before the robbery. Amanda and Olivia reveal Marquis's armed robbery, convincing Tess to avoid him and testify against Mosley. At trial, Rourke must convincing the jury that Mosley, by accomplice liability, is guilty of rape, and murdering Imran and Lynch. Vaughn argues Mosley never intended any crimes; only to end a hostage standoff by shooting Lynch in defense of others, as Carisi had advised him. Carisi's anger complicates Rourke's case, but she calls fellow inmate Jay Goldstein, who testifies regarding Mosley's intent.
569	18	"The Accuser"	Martha Mitchell	Andrea Ciannavei	April 10, 2025	2618	3.71
After Carl Hess leaves, metalworker Eddie Upshaw is attacked. Nate Carson's son Sam discovers Eddie. A uni reports, Upshaw was sodomized with an object, and 6-15-01 was carved into his back. At Allie Solano's home, girlfriend Yesenia cannot alibi Sam. Nate's alibi checks out. TARU finds Upshaw called Sam ten times that night. Doctor Klein indicates the perpetrator ensured a permanent scar. About the attack, Upshaw insists, "Sometimes there is no reason." His ex-wife Jenny claims the date means nothing. Sam tells Bruno that Eddie groomed him for sex. Polecam footage confirms Sam's innocence. Benson predicts, Upshaw likely victimized others. Sam tells his mother Jessica and Nate what happened. Curry finds a 2002, sealed Jane Doe case against Upshaw. Velasco and Curry retrieve the county clerk's files showing Upshaw was acquitted, and the eight year-old Jane Doe's name was redacted. Confronted for lying, Jenny names Angela Jones, who was paroled days before Upshaw's attack. After fleeing, Curry collars Angela, who admits doing "what someone should have done 20 years ago." Carisi's questions, "are you admitting guilt?", she replies, "Oh, I don't feel guilt at all....it was worth it." Counselor Kingston Giddens accepts Carisi's plea deal for Angela.
570	19	"Play with Fire Part 2"	Juan J. Campanella	David Graziano & Julie Martin	April 17, 2025	2619	4.23
Father Alberto runs from decorated, twenty-year NYPD veteran, Lieutenant Paul Gomez, struggling over Gomez's gun. Benson warns, "drop it", but Alberto cries, "I can't." Gomez is shot; he kills Alberto with his holdout. M.E. Libby Wagner matches Gomez's blood with semen from Detective Maria Recinos's corpse. Benson gets an electronic warrant on Gomez, then confronts a man (identified later as ex-cop Mueller Hayes) abducting her son Noah. SVU discovers, Gomez called Charisse Johnson, a sex worker who took Miguel Pinto's semen to frame him for Ana Machado's murder. Beatriz Soto supplies Rosa Ortega's friend Cassie Reyes's photo. Cassie assumed Gomez killed Rosa because, "He'd been raping her. Me too", threatening her arrest for drugs. Shamed, Cassie, who has a new life with Sean O'Brien, will not testify. Wagner matches Gomez's DNA to semen in Ortega; Gomez is arrested. Grace Brionés testifies that Gomez followed Recinos into the warehouse. Attorney Rita Calhoun cautions about perjury; Grace, intimidated by Hayes, wavers. Benson and Brady convince Cassie to testify. Detective Elliot Stabler threatens Hayes regarding Olivia and Noah. Judge Karyn Blake allows Cassie's testimony over Calhoun's objections. The jury foreperson reads the guilty verdict for rape and murder of Rosa, Maria and Ana. Note: This episode concludes a crossover event that begins on Law & Order season 24 episode 19 "Play with Fire Part 1".
571	20	"Shock Collar"	Norberto Barba	Teleplay by : Kathy Dobie & Candice Sanchez McFarlane; Story by : David Graziano & Julie Martin	May 1, 2025	2620	3.66
572	21	"Aperture"	Jean de Segonzac	Michael Carnes	May 8, 2025	2621	3.56
When an assault at gunpoint is witnessed through a neighboring window, the squad scrambles to locate the victim to confirm that she is safe. Meanwhile, a threat to extort the victim's family leads to a shocking suspect.
573	22	"Post-Rage"	Norberto Barba	Teleplay by : Kelly Minster & Ben Gaspin; Story by : David Graziano & Julie Martin	May 15, 2025	2622	3.99
Cast: Final appearance of Juliana Aidén Martinez as Detective Kate Silva.

== Ratings ==
Viewership and ratings per episode of Law & Order: Special Victims Unit season 26
No.	Title	Air date	Rating/share (18–49)	Viewers (millions)	DVR (18–49)	DVR viewers (millions)	Total (18–49)	Total viewers (millions)
1	"Fractured"	October 3, 2024	0.4/4	3.81	—N/a	—N/a	—N/a	—N/a
2	"Excavation"	October 10, 2024	0.4/4	3.77	—N/a	—N/a	—N/a	—N/a
3	"Divide and Conquer"	October 17, 2024	0.3/3	3.19	0.3	1.93	0.6	5.16
4	"Constricted"	October 24, 2024	0.4/4	3.44	0.2	1.83	0.6	5.27
5	"Economics of Shame"	October 31, 2024	0.3/3	3.52	0.3	2.06	0.7	5.58
6	"Rorschach"	November 7, 2024	0.3/3	3.13	0.3	2.09	0.6	5.22
7	"Tenfold"	November 14, 2024	0.3/3	3.32	0.3	2.08	0.6	5.40
8	"Cornered"	November 21, 2024	0.4/4	4.26	0.2	1.73	0.6	5.96
9	"First Light"	January 16, 2025	0.5/7	4.55	0.2	1.89	0.7	6.44
10	"Master Key"	January 23, 2025	0.4/6	4.76	0.3	1.98	0.7	6.76
11	"Deductible"	January 30, 2025	0.3/5	3.94	0.3	1.86	0.6	5.81
12	"Calculated"	February 13, 2025	0.4/5	3.99	0.3	1.69	0.6	5.68
13	"Extinguished"	February 20, 2025	0.4/4	3.84	0.2	1.80	0.6	5.64
14	"The Grid Plan"	February 27, 2025	0.3/5	3.81	0.3	1.77	0.6	5.58
15	"Undertow"	March 13, 2025	0.3/4	3.50	0.3	1.80	0.6	5.32
16	"Let Me Bring Pardon"	March 20, 2025	0.3/3	4.01	0.3	1.99	0.6	6.00
17	"Accomplice Liability"	April 3, 2025	0.3/5	3.36	0.2	1.90	0.5	5.26
18	"The Accuser"	April 10, 2025	0.3/5	3.71	0.2	1.76	0.5	5.47
19	"Play with Fire Part 2"	April 17, 2025	0.4/6	4.23	0.2	1.85	0.6	6.08
20	"Shock Collar"	May 1, 2025	0.3/5	3.66	0.2	1.90	0.5	5.56
21	"Aperture"	May 8, 2025	0.4/6	3.56	0.2	1.93	0.7	5.50
22	"Post-Rage"	May 15, 2025	0.3/5	3.99	0.2	1.79	0.6	5.75
