= Law & Order: Special Victims Unit season 28 =

Season of American television series

Law & Order: Special Victims Unit
- Season 28
- Promotional poster
- Showrunner: Michele Fazekas
- Starring: Mariska Hargitay; Ice-T; Peter Scanavino; Kevin Kane; Aimé Donna Kelly; Corey Cott; Kelli Giddish
- No. of episodes: 6

Release
- Original network: NBC
- Original release: October 8, 2026 – present

Season chronology
- ← Previous; Season 27

The twenty-eighth season of American police procedural crime drama Law & Order: Special Victims Unit premiered on NBC on October 8, 2026. The season is produced by Wolf Entertainment, in conjunction with Universal Television.

Michele Fazekas returns as showrunner, following her appointment in the previous season. Mariska Hargitay, Ice-T, Peter Scanavino, Kevin Kane, Aimé Donna Kelly, Corey Cott, and Kelli Giddish reprise their roles as Captain Olivia Benson, Sergeant Odafin "Fin" Tutuola, Assistant District Attorney Dominick "Sonny" Carisi, Jr., Detective Terry Bruno, Captain Renee Curry, Detective Jake Griffin, and Sergeant Amanda Rollins, respectively.

== Production ==
=== Development ===
Law & Order: Special Victims Unit's renewal for a twenty-eighth season was announced on April 16, 2026, with Michele Fazekas returning as showrunner. A two-season order was given to the series when NBC announced the series' renewal for its twenty-seventh season in 2025. That June, it was announced the season would premiere on October 8, 2026.

=== Filming ===
Filming for season 28 commenced on July 22, 2026. Production for the 600th episode began September 22, 2026.

=== Casting ===
Along with the season's renewal in April 2026, it was revealed that Mariska Hargitay (Captain Olivia Benson), Ice-T (Sergeant Odafin "Fin" Tutuola), Peter Scanavino (Assistant District Attorney Dominick "Sonny" Carisi, Jr.), Kelli Giddish (Sergeant Amanda Rollins), Kevin Kane (Detective Terry Bruno), and Aimé Donna Kelly (Captain Renee Curry) would remain with the series. Following that May's season 27 finale, Fazekas expressed her interest in having the entirety of the main cast return for the season. At the same time, Corey Cott (Detective Jake Griffin) alluded to the fact that he would return for the season, despite his name being excluded alongside the season's renewal.

In July 2026, Ice-T revealed during TMZ's podcast that he would appear full-time during the season, following a reduced episode count during the previous one, following Giddish's return. That August, it was revealed the entire regular cast would return for the twenty-eighth season. That same month, it was announced J. Smith-Cameron had joined the cast in the recurring role of Gwen Sharpe. Gwen is a jury consultant who will also act as a peer for Hargitay's Olivia. Speaking on the character's introduction, Fazekas said that Gwen would be introduced as "somebody who's very, very experienced in a different way" that Olivia could talk to that was not a subordinate. She further divulged that she expected Smith-Cameron to appear "at least three times, if not more" during the season, beginning with the season's premiere episode.

Season 28 introduced Jelani Alladin as Aidan Hawkins, the newest Assistant District Attorney (ADA), who is being trained by Scanavino's Sonny. Aidan is characterized as "kind of a rich kid" who attended Harvard University and aspires to run for office.

== Cast and characters ==
=== Main ===
- Mariska Hargitay as Captain Olivia Benson
- Ice-T as Sergeant Odafin "Fin" Tutuola
- Peter Scanavino as Assistant District Attorney Dominick "Sonny" Carisi, Jr.
- Kevin Kane as Detective Terry Bruno
- Aimé Donna Kelly as Captain Renee Curry
- Corey Cott as Detective Jake Griffin
- Kelli Giddish as Sergeant Amanda Rollins

=== Recurring ===
- Jelani Alladin as Assistant District Attorney Aidan Hawkins
- J. Smith-Cameron as Gwen Sharpe

=== Guest stars ===
In August 2026, Hargitay teased that New York Knicks player Jalen Brunson could guest star during the season. The following month, it was announced he would appear during the season's fifth episode as Detective Madison, which aired on November 5, 2026. Christopher Meloni appeared as Elliot Stabler during the series' 600th episode, which aired on November 12, 2026, alongside Kathleen Chalfant and Laura Innes. In May 2026, Fazekas teased Meloni's return and Wolf Entertainment president Peter Jankowski revealed that Meloni had previously met with Fazekas about reprising the role. On October 1, 2026, ahead of the season's October 8 premiere, Fazekas revealed that despite discussions, there were no plans for any crossovers with Law & Order within the season. During the second episode, Abby Mueller and Anthony Goes made appearances as Helene Brooks and Thomas Brooks, respectively. Additionally, Tony Goldwyn appeared as District Attorney Nicholas Baxter. On October 23, 2026, it was announced Stephanie March would reprise the role of Alexandra Cabot during the season's ninth episode. Rick Gonzalez will appear as his Organized Crime character Bobby Reyes during the season's seventh episode.

== Episodes ==
Law & Order: Special Victims Unit season 28 episodes
No. overall	No. in season	Title	Directed by	Written by	Original release date	Prod. code
595	1	"Volition"	Brenna Malloy	Michele Fazekas	October 8, 2026	2801
A young woman is gang-raped at a party by three men, although she acknowledges being in and out of consciousness due to excessive drinking. Sonny is joined in the District Attorney's office by a new prosecutor named Aidan Hawkins. Aidan and Olivia clash with Sonny when they bend the rules and arrest the mother of one of the perpetrators for obstruction, despite her having willingly provided SVU with evidence against her son.
596	2	"Midway"	Juan José Campanella	Kevin Deiboldt	October 15, 2026	2802
The disappearance of nine-year-old Leo Brooks from a carnival leads SVU detectives to a carnival worker named Mary, later revealed to actually be a woman named Catherine, who was abducted at age five by a man who both abused and brainwashed her for the next 14 years. She admits to locking Leo in a wooden crate, which results in his death. When Sonny wants to make a deal to put Catherine in a highly secure mental facility for ten years, her parents, who have been located, refuse, believing she should not do any time at all.
597	3	"Anonymity"	Norberto Barba	Nicholas P. Evangelista	October 22, 2026	2803
The case involving a young boy, whose babysitter facilitated a meeting with a creator of child pornography, leads the SVU detectives to a complex website featuring multiple administrative levels. However, their attempts to shut down the site are stopped by federal investigators, who aim to take control and operate the site in order to dismantle a larger child trafficking network. Olivia challenges the federal agents by persisting with her investigation alongside her team.
598	4	"Arcana"	Oscar Rene Lozoya II	Brant Englestein	October 29, 2026	2804
A clairvoyant decides to report a rape that occurred hours earlier following a morning reading with a client. Olivia and the SVU investigate, uncovering a complicated family history that includes an abusive father and a mother suffering from Alzheimer's disease. She claimed in 1996 that she shot and killed her husband, the father, in self-defense.
599	5	"Forsaken"	Steve Boyum	Justine Ferrara	November 5, 2026	2805
A teenage girl is attacked and raped in the bridal suite at a wedding. When the SVU begin to investigate the incident, they begin to suspect and investigate the girl's family, and are called after her youngest brother stabs a teacher with scissors. As the SVU continues to investigate, they uncover the secrets of the girl's step-father and step-brother, and the control they have held over the family.
600	6	"Obedience"	Brenna Malloy	Michele Fazekas	November 12, 2026	2806
When Olivia is approached by Gwen about an inmate who has been incarcerated since 1998 for the rape of a nun, she realizes it is a case that she and Elliot Stabler worked on. When the investigation is reopened, Olivia, Elliott, and Gwen travel to Attica Correctional Facility to meet with the inmate, who continues to proclaim his innocence. Back in the city, the SVU investigate a priest who has a history connected to the case.
601	7	"Untouchable"	TBA	Kevin J. Hynes	December 3, 2026	2807
602	8	TBA	TBA	Kevin Deiboldt	January 7, 2027	2808

== Reception ==
Ahead of the season's premiere, Collider contributor Chelsea Adelaine Hassler wrote that despite the expected guest return of Meloni's Elliott Stabler, the series still had what she described as a "detective problem" that familiar faces, like Meloni's, could not fix. In the article, she wrote: "SVU may never recreate the exact chemistry that made it a television institution, but the only way it can get there is by letting a consistent cast stick around for a few years." She concluded with her hope that Hargitay's Olivia had found an "ensemble that stays together long enough to start writing a new story that takes the show out of its current rut".

The premiere episode drew comparison to the 2024 Cornell University rape allegations, which had recently been reopened for investigation. USA Today reported that despite similarities between the episode's storyline (which they described as an "especially timely story") and the actual case, Fazekas revealed she was unaware of the case when writing the episode. (Note: The episode "Volition", written by Michele Fazekas, has a dated credit of August 26, 2026, according to the Writers Guild of America. This predates the September 2026 renewed interest in the Cornell 7 case.) She further told press that she, along with producers and writers, had focused on "how the law is written" where the episode's storyline was concerned and expressed her hope for ongoing dialogue to take place concerning the laws and how they prevent law enforcement from pursuing cases.
