= Law & Order: Special Victims Unit season 25 =

Season of American television series

Law & Order: Special Victims Unit
- Season 25
- Season 25 U.S. DVD cover
- Starring: Mariska Hargitay; Ice-T; Peter Scanavino; Octavio Pisano
- No. of episodes: 13

Release
- Original network: NBC
- Original release: January 18 – May 16, 2024

Season chronology
- ← Previous; Season 24 Next → Season 26

The twenty-fifth season of the American crime-drama television series Law & Order: Special Victims Unit was ordered on April 10, 2023, by NBC. Originally slated to premiere in September 2023, the season premiered on January 18, 2024, and concluded on May 16, 2024, following the 2023 Writers Guild of America and SAG-AFTRA strikes. The season consisted of only 13 episodes making it the shortest in the show's history, beating the record previously held by the twenty-second season and produced by Wolf Entertainment and Universal Television; David Graziano is continuing as showrunner, following the departure of Warren Leight at the conclusion of the twenty-third season.

After joining the cast in the previous season, Molly Burnett departed the series following the season 24 finale. On November 28, 2023, it was announced Kelli Giddish would return for the season premiere following her mid-season departure during the twenty-fourth season, and returning as a guest star close to the season finale.

== Cast ==
=== Main ===
- Mariska Hargitay as Captain Olivia Benson
- Ice-T as Sergeant Odafin "Fin" Tutuola
- Peter Scanavino as Assistant District Attorney Dominick "Sonny" Carisi, Jr.
- Octavio Pisano as Junior Detective Joe Velasco

=== Special guest stars after their departure ===
- Kelli Giddish as Professor Amanda Rollins (former Senior Detective) (episodes 1, 11)
- Christopher Meloni as Senior Detective Elliot Stabler (voice only, uncredited; episode 13)

=== Recurring ===
- Erin Anderson as Attorney April Andrews
- Ami Brabson as Judge Karyn Blake
- Stephen C. Bradbury as Judge Colin McNamara
- Ryan Buggle as Noah Porter-Benson
- Brian Cade as Attorney Harris Malone
- Patrick Carroll as George Brouchard
- Leilany Celeste as Tanya Garcia
- Josh Cooke as FBI Special Agent in Charge Harrison Clay
- Allison Elaine as Maddie Flynn
- Leslie Fray as Eileen Flynn
- Ashley Taylor Greaves as Officer Gabrielle Taylor
- Kevin Kane as Junior Detective Terry Bruno
- Aimé Donna Kelly as IAB Captain Renee Curry
- Yvonna Kopacz-Wright as Dr. Darby Wilder
- Edie Salas Miller as Officer Tiffany Gómez
- Tricia Paoluccio as Dr. Heather Lentz
- Zack Robidas as Peter Flynn
- Terry Serpico as NYPD Assistant Chief Thomas McGrath
- Jordana Spiro as FBI Special Agent Shannah Sykes

=== Notable guests ===
- Amy Carlson as Katie McGrath
- Max Casella as Mickey Dowling
- David Krumholtz as Dr. Raymond Goldberg, a dermatologist.

== Episodes ==
Law & Order: Special Victims Unit season 25 episodes
No. overall	No. in season	Title	Directed by	Written by	Original release date	Prod. code	U.S. viewers (millions)
539	1	"Tunnel Blind"	Norberto Barba	David Graziano & Julie Martin	January 18, 2024	2501	5.66
After SVU members celebrate the baptism of Carisi's and Rollins' newborn child, Benson thinks she sees a teen in distress, being abducted in broad daylight, but because she had been "tunnel blinded" she cannot be sure until later when Maddie Flynn's parents report her missing. As the squad tracks down leads, another missing teen, Tanya Garcia, is found.
540	2	"Truth Embargo"	Jean de Segonzac	Brendan Feeney & Nicholas Evangelista	January 25, 2024	2502	5.00
Benson has flashbacks to Maddie Flynn's abduction as the search continues with the help of FBI Agent Harrison Clay (Josh Cooke) who forms a CART (Child Abduction Response Team) including the BAU (Behavioral Analysis Unit). Tutuola and Velasco investigate a flash mob robbery of a department store, during which Natalie Ross (Romina D'Ugo) is raped. After the suspect is found, Carisi and Benson must deal with Natalie, who is reluctant to identify the suspect at the lineup and in open court because of a past miscarriage of justice to someone close to her.
541	3	"The Punch List"	Norberto Barba	David Graziano & Gabriel Vallejo	February 1, 2024	2503	5.23
Tess, a female escort, admits to being a rapist, but then reveals she was forced into the act at gunpoint. Fin, Bruno and Velasco investigate two suspects, Duvall and Reese, as they try to help Dr. Ray Goldberg deal with being victimized. Carisi tasks them with finding corroborating evidence, such as the gun or a confession. Officer Tiffany Gómez (Edie Salas Miller, introduced in the previous episode, "Truth Embargo") joins the squad. Tragedy strikes the Flynn family again; Benson and Gómez comfort Eileen when her husband Pete attempts suicide from feeling guilty about their daughter Maddie's abduction.
542	4	"Duty to Report"	Juan J. Campanella	Kathy Dobie & Candice Sanchez McFarlane	February 8, 2024	2504	4.82
After Benson tries EMDR therapy for trauma over Maddie's abduction, her therapist tells her about Chief McGrath's teen daughter Shea being sexually assaulted. As the squad interrogates Saagar Shah, McGrath threatens the suspect, forcing Benson to report it to IAB Captain Renee Curry. After Shea admits that her rapist is next-door neighbor Liam Dowling, tensions rise between McGrath and Mickey Dowling (Max Casella), during a DV police call. McGrath is put on modified duty while Capt. Curry takes over as temporary Chief of SVU.
543	5	"Zone Rouge"	Bethany Rooney	David Graziano & Julie Martin	February 22, 2024	2505	5.07
A message on a Pennsylvania train ticket prompts Benson to call Pittsburgh SVU to find kidnapping victim Maddie Flynn. When surveillance video captures George Brouchard (Patrick Carroll), Tanya Garcia (from Episode 1, "Tunnel Blind") recognizes him as "George-from-Canada" who described his train stops as "Zone Rouge", neglected in-between places that few travelers visit. Benson helps FBI Special Agent Shannah Sykes (Jordana Spiro), who has a personal interest in the case which hits close to home. The search for Maddie leads to Rochester and a dendrophile "peeping Tom", Leonard Fleming (Alex Parkinson), who bought Maddie from George.
544	6	"Carousel"	Michael Smith	Brendan Feeney & Michael Carnes	February 29, 2024	2506	4.72
FBI Agent Sykes embeds with the SVU and quickly joins Benson and Curry to interview Leah Tan (Anastasia Lin), a tourist who was raped after staying at a hostel. Leah books her return flight to Singapore, forcing Bruno and Velasco to scramble to investigate suspects at Cambridge before Tan can leave the country. The whole squad splits up to interrogate three suspects to find which one raped Leah, when another victim is identified; Nikol Rakovsky from Bulgaria. Evidence of a map for a sex tourism game is found, along with score-keeping via DNA collection and analysis by a fourth Cambridge student.
545	7	"Probability of Doom"	Martha Mitchell	David Graziano & Nicholas Evangelista	March 14, 2024	2507	4.70
At a police cadet graduation commencement ceremony, Benson tries to reconnect with Officer Maria Recinos, who was a victim she saved years ago (in Season 7, Episode 3 "911"). Lisa Miller reports to the SVU that her husband Wayne possesses child pornography. Upon investigating, they find him dismembered and wrapped in plastic. While SVU interrogates Lisa, a second body, that of pedophile Gary Turner, is found, and the only evidence connecting the two are vehicle trackers and the “K-Dome” application, used by drug dealers. This leads to a pair of sisters, Tori and Nina Brock, whose father James has been away on a job. A third body is soon discovered.
546	8	"Third Man Syndrome"	Norberto Barba	Kathy Dobie & Candice Sanchez McFarlane	March 21, 2024	2508	4.10
Javi Lopez, a Colombian national visiting NYC, is brutally assaulted in a Greenwich Village street, leading Carisi to pursue hate crime charges. Commissioner Robin Pettis (Robert Newman) pressures Benson, both at the hospital and in the media, to find those responsible. Benson and Tutuola question a homeless witness, Venable Thomas, who leads them to yet another witness, a nearby agoraphobic shut-in Anne Holmes who is too scared to speak up, but is the only one who can positively identify the perpetrators. Having heard two of their names, the squad follows a lead to Jersey, where they locate Zach Swann, Mo Franks and Jordan Ramirez. Benson and Carisi help Anne to remain calm at the station for the lineup. While Lopez insists that there was another witness, Anne says there wasn't, leading Bruno to suggest that the discrepancy was due to third man syndrome.
547	9	"Children of Wolves"	Mariska Hargitay	David Graziano & Julie Martin	April 11, 2024	2509	4.07
Benson helps Noah come to terms about his past and his father, Johnny D (from Season 16, Episodes 15 "Undercover Mother" and 23 "Surrendering Noah"). While she reads Little Red Riding Hood to calm him to sleep, a teen girl with a red hoodie is sexually assaulted in Fort Tryon Park, found unconscious without ID, with signs of a second victim leading to a missing persons investigation. The nanny Marva James IDs her as Rosie Meadows, and the second as Sydney Lynch. Sydney's step-mother Denise (Kerry Butler) gets a call from her, but Benson realizes that Sydney has been abducted. The squad and TARU try to locate her through her phone and crime scene evidence, leading them to a yacht club at City Island where more evidence is uncovered; cellphone, red hoodie, DNA, and video of the four-man "wolf pack". The leader of the pack, Seth Piper, is located and Benson talks him down from a hostage situation after his mother calls him. After brain-dead Rosie is taken off life-support by her parents, Benson and Velasco take Seth back to the park for a "Stations of the Cross" forensic reenactment. Sydney also helps to fill in the blanks, and then Nassau County SVU reports that the DNA is a match to six more unsolved rapes on Long Island. Meanwhile, Carisi worries about the George Brouchard trial after losing a key witness.: On April 10th, Hargitay stopped filming at Anne Loftus Playground in Fort Tryon Park and spent 20 minutes reuniting a lost girl with her mother and talking with them afterwards. The girl saw the prop police badge hanging from Hargitay's belt and, thinking she was a real NYPD cop, asked for help finding her parent.
548	10	"Combat Fatigue"	Michael Smith	David Graziano & Julie Martin	April 18, 2024	2510	4.78
The SVU and Carisi anxiously awaits the verdict in Maddie's kidnapping case. Upon Brouchard's insistence, the jurors are polled after a guilty verdict is delivered. One hold-out juror, Slater Dent, declares in open court that she was forced to vote guilty, but admits in-chambers that she and Brouchard have "a connection" and hopes to be with him after his acquittal. After the judge declares a mistrial, Eileen Flynn, suffering from combat fatigue says Maddie cannot go through another trial. Maddie is re-interviewed and changes her story, claiming that Brouchard did indeed touch her sexually before selling her. Carisis faces putting Maddie on the witness stand twice more, with the Grand Jury, and the retrial, making her a riskier witness. Faced with the prospect of being put on the sex offender registry, Brouchard fires his lawyer to represent himself, pro se, and then posts a million-dollar bail. Benson orders 24/7 surveillance on Brouchard, but Pete Flynn shows Benson DM photos and texts indicating that his wife Eileen may be under Brouchard's psychopathic, Messianic, nihilistic spell. During the retrial, Eileen loses hope of a conviction and confronts Brouchard at gunpoint. Benson must talk her down in order for the trial to continue. Carisi delivers his closing arguments to insist on a guilty verdict. Benson tries to help Maddie and the Flynn family recover from the trauma.
549	11	"Prima Nocta"	Jean de Segonzac	David Graziano & Julie Martin	May 2, 2024	2511	4.32
Runaway bride Jenna Chapman jilts her fiance Philip Sutton at the altar, and calls the SVU for help. Rollins, after turning down a tenure offer at Fordham, and now a bored, unemployed professor, pitches in on her first day off. Jenna discloses to Benson and Rollins that she was raped the previous night. DNA links to a rape six months prior with the same MO of occurring the night before a wedding, indicating a serial rapist. Rollins makes the connection to Prima nocta, droit de seigneur, the supposed medieval legal right for feudal lords to have sex with any bride on her wedding night. The prior victim, ER nurse Darcy Hamlin, corroborates the details. A precinct detective gives the team a lead to yet another unreported incident, which Benson and Tutuola investigate. Breena Richards provides a clue to a flower wholesaler that leads to Leon Wallace, but with a manufactured alibi, Benson looks to Carisi and Rollins to bait Wallace into another attack.
550	12	"Marauder"	Juan J. Campanella	Teleplay by : Gabriel Vallejo & Greg Contaldi; Story by : Brendan Feeney	May 9, 2024	2512	4.12
Agent Sykes goes MIA for three days as she struggles to cope on the anniversary of her sister Crystal's disappearance. Benson finds five other cold cases in ViCAP that might point to a "marauder" style rapist, including one Gwen Markham in Manhattan. After taking to Joanna Markham (Blair Ross) and her family, Benson gets a call from Allentown Det. Ed McCluskey (Kenneth Tigar), the original investigator. Meanwhile, Bruno and Velasco talk to another New Yorker, Harry Dao, about his missing daughter. Dao hands them postcards sent after her disappearance. The postal VES codes (AKA, eVS for Electronic Verification System) put the point of origin in Bayonne NJ, but it's a dead end. Benson hits a roadblock exhuming Gwen's body for DNA, so Cal Markham falsely confesses to bypass his family's permission. The seminal DNA isn't in CODIS, but there's a familial match to a daughter, Hannah Kincaid in Bridgewater NJ, which leads to her father Richard Kincaid (Larry Pine), and some measure of closure for Sykes.
551	13	"Duty to Hope"	Norberto Barba	David Graziano & Julie Martin	May 16, 2024	2513	4.14
The SVU hunt down a pattern rapist who uses a gun. The new Trial Division Chief Heidi Russell rudely interrupts Benson's status meeting. Ariel Bradford becomes the next victim. A fingerprint for sanitation worker Billy Hedges is found so Russell pressures Carisi to close the case quickly due to public outcry. Hedges is arrested and Jailed, and Fin is shot by Hedges' son, Toby. The squad has doubts about Hedges, especially after Sara Gomez is attacked. Sara describes the gun, and the perpetrator leaves behind his holster with touch DNA, identifying him as Glenn Duncan, who was dishonorably discharged from MARSOC. Duncan opens fire on police with an automatic assault rifle, forcing Benson to rescue Officer Montero who was hit. Benson tries to negotiate with Duncan who has Jane Emery hostage, but ESU Captain Sasso moves in. Hedges is released, and Benson attends Maddie Flynn's 16th birthday.: Eddie Hargitay who plays Officer Montero is Mariska Hargitay's cousin. Mariska's father, Mickey Hargitay, was Eddie's godfather.

== Ratings ==
Viewership and ratings per episode of Law & Order: Special Victims Unit season 25
No.	Title	Air date	Rating (18–49)	Viewers (millions)	DVR (18–49)	DVR viewers (millions)	Total (18–49)	Total viewers (millions)	Ref.
1	"Tunnel Blind"	January 18, 2024	0.6/7	5.66	—N/a	—N/a	—N/a	—N/a	
2	"Truth Embargo"	January 25, 2024	0.5/6	5.00	—N/a	—N/a	—N/a	—N/a	
3	"The Punch List"	February 1, 2024	0.5/6	5.23	—N/a	—N/a	—N/a	—N/a	
4	"Duty to Report"	February 8, 2024	0.5/6	4.82	—N/a	—N/a	—N/a	—N/a	
5	"Zone Rouge"	February 22, 2024	0.6/6	5.07	—N/a	—N/a	—N/a	—N/a	
6	"Carousel"	February 29, 2024	0.5/6	4.72	—N/a	—N/a	—N/a	—N/a	
7	"Probability of Doom"	March 14, 2024	0.5/5	4.70	0.3	2.10	0.8	6.80	
8	"Third Man Syndrome"	March 21, 2024	0.4/3	4.10	—N/a	—N/a	—N/a	—N/a	
9	"Children of Wolves"	April 11, 2024	0.3/4	4.07	—N/a	—N/a	—N/a	—N/a	
10	"Combat Fatigue"	April 18, 2024	0.5/6	4.78	0.3	2.10	0.8	6.88	
11	"Prima Nocta"	May 2, 2024	0.4/4	4.32	0.4	2.28	0.8	6.60	
12	"Marauder"	May 9, 2024	0.4/5	4.12	0.3	2.09	0.8	6.21	
13	"Duty to Hope"	May 16, 2024	0.4/4	4.14	0.4	2.15	0.8	6.29	
