= Law & Order: Special Victims Unit season 27 =

Season of American television series

Law & Order: Special Victims Unit
- Season 27
- Promotional poster via Peacock
- Showrunner: Michele Fazekas
- Starring: Mariska Hargitay; Ice-T; Peter Scanavino; Octavio Pisano; Kevin Kane; Aimé Donna Kelly; Kelli Giddish; Corey Cott
- No. of episodes: 21

Release
- Original network: NBC
- Original release: September 25, 2025 – May 14, 2026

Season chronology
- ← Previous; Season 26 Next → Season 28

The twenty-seventh season of American police procedural crime drama Law & Order: Special Victims Unit premiered on NBC on September 25, 2025, and concluded on May 14, 2026. The season was produced by Wolf Entertainment, in conjunction with Universal Television, and featured 21 episodes.

Michele Fazekas served as showrunner, following the departure of David Graziano. Mariska Hargitay, Ice-T, Peter Scanavino, and Kevin Kane reprised their roles as Captain Olivia Benson, Sergeant Odafin "Fin" Tutuola, Assistant District Attorney Dominick "Sonny" Carisi, Jr., and Detective Terry Bruno, respectively. Kelli Giddish, who had been making guest appearances following her departure during the twenty-fourth season, returned in a regular capacity as Sergeant Amanda Rollins, while Octavio Pisano reprised his role as Detective Joe Velasco, retaining his series regular status for the season's first three episodes. Additionally, Aimé Donna Kelly, who previously recurred as Captain Renee Curry, was promoted to series regular. Beginning with the ninth episode of the season, Corey Cott (Detective Jake Griffin) was promoted to series regular.

== Production ==
=== Development ===
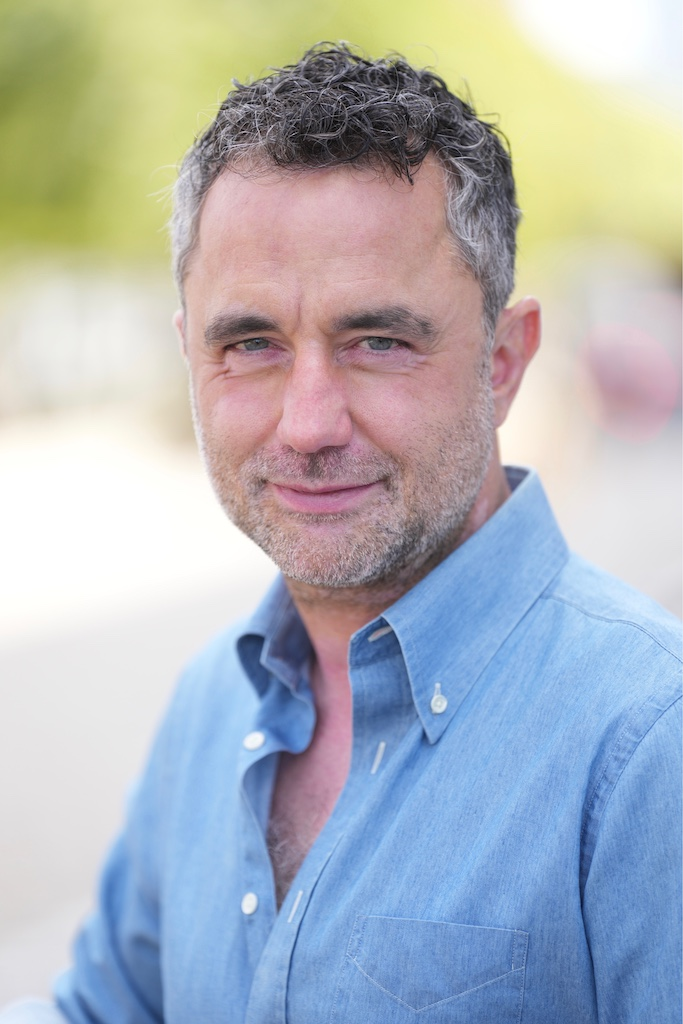
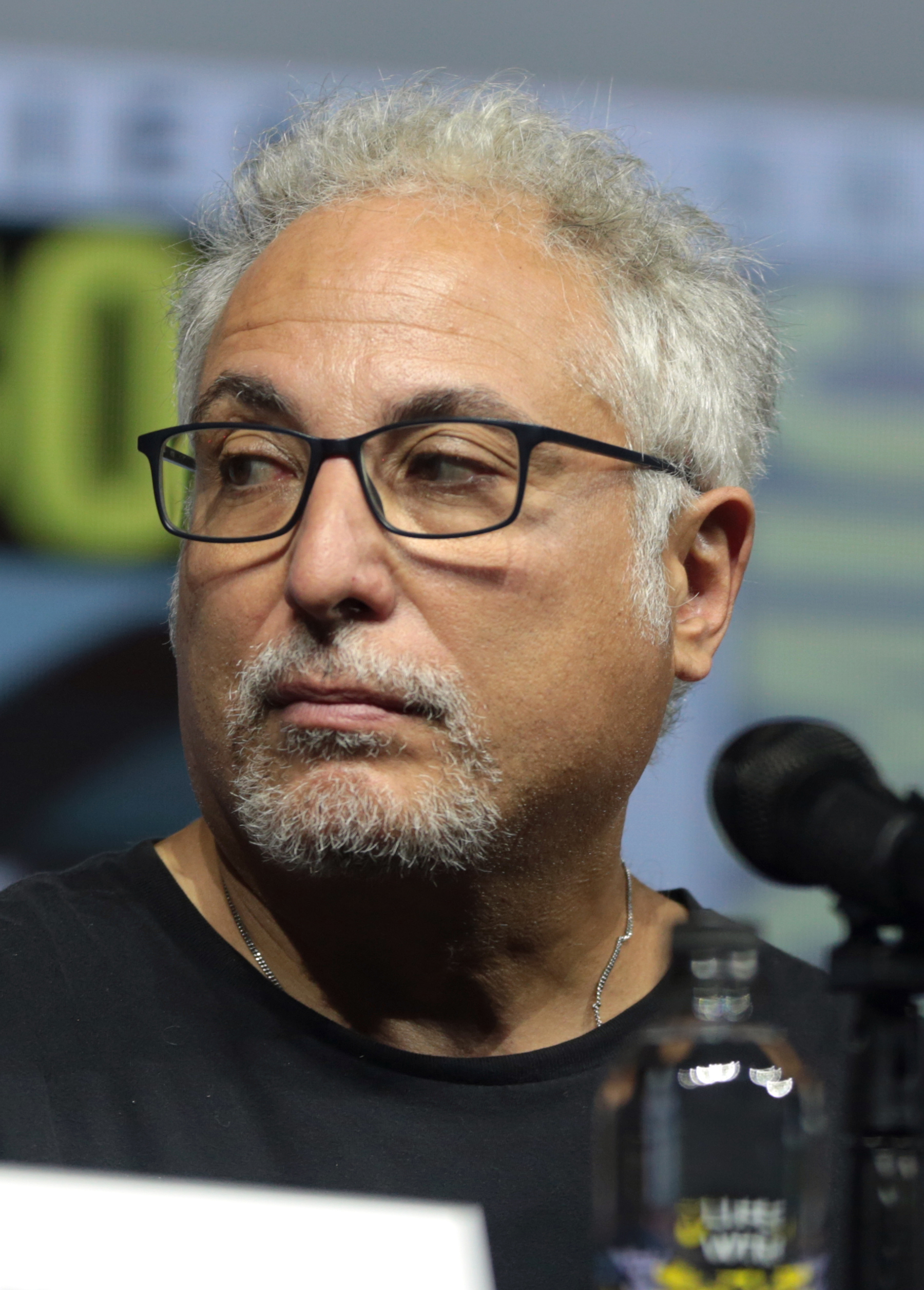
Left to right: David Graziano and Norberto Barba vacated their roles as showrunner and executive producer, respectively, ahead of season 27.

Law & Order: Special Victims Unit was renewed for a twenty-seventh season on May 8, 2025. That July, NBC announced the season would premiere on September 25, 2025.

Following David Graziano's departure at the conclusion of the twenty-sixth season, Michele Fazekas was named as his successor as showrunner; this made her the first woman to hold the position in the series' history. She previous acted as a writer-producer from the third to seventh seasons. Norberto Barba and Julie Martin exited as executive producers, while Brenna Malloy was subsequently named as an executive producer and directing producer for the season.

Speaking on becoming the series' first female showrunner, Fazekas described it as "crazy, in a way, that after 26 years on the air that [a female showrunner] didn't happen. Although not, I guess, totally surprising." She further cited Mariska Hargitay as reason for her decision to accept the position, and revealed her intentions to change things about the series, in an effort to freshen up the series, while keeping with its roots.

On January 12, 2026, the season's tenth episode, titled "Corrosive", which was due to air three days later, was removed from the schedule. According to reports, NBC removed the episode after arrest warrants were issued for guest star Timothy Busfield three days earlier. In response, the network advanced the eleventh episode, which was originally scheduled to air on January 22. The following month, it was announced Busfield's role was recast with David Zayas, and the episode was rescheduled to air on February 26.

=== Casting ===
Season twenty-six cast members Hargitay (Captain Olivia Benson), Ice-T as (Odafin "Fin" Tutuola), Peter Scanavino (Assistant District Attorney Dominick "Sonny" Carisi, Jr.), and Kevin Kane (Detective Terry Bruno) returned to the show for the twenty-seventh season. In May 2025, ahead of the season twenty-six finale, it was revealed Juliana Aidén Martinez (Junior Detective Kate Silva) and Octavio Pisano (Detective Joe Velasco) would depart the series. That same month, Kelli Giddish's return as a series regular was announced. Two months later, it was reported Aimé Donna Kelly, who previously joined the series in the recurring role of Captain Renee Curry during the twenty-second season, had been promoted to series regular. Pisano was later announced to have reprised his role, beginning with the season's premiere episode. He departed at the conclusion of the third episode. In February 2026, it was reported Pisano was spotted on-set; his return was later announced by Deadline Hollywood, and aired as part of the seventeenth episode. Pisano made an announced appearance during the twentieth episode, sharing scenes with Hargitay's Olivia.

Norma Kuhling joined the series in the recurring role of Cindy "CJ" Jones, who works with Carisi in the district attorney's office. She made her first appearance during the season's second episode. Corey Cott, who joined the season as Detective Jake Griffin, was promoted to a series regular, starting with the ninth episode. Previously, in the eighteenth season, Cott portrayed Ellis Griffin, a suspect in the sexual assault of an unconscious girl.

With Giddish's return as a series regular, Ice-T's minimum guarantees were lessened. He attributed his lack of appearances to budgetary concerns with Giddish's return and other new cast members. In March 2026, Ice-T revealed he was back on set and filming the final three episodes of the season.

== Cast and characters ==
=== Main ===
- Mariska Hargitay as Captain Olivia Benson
- Ice-T as Sergeant Odafin "Fin" Tutuola
- Peter Scanavino as Assistant District Attorney Dominick "Sonny" Carisi, Jr.
- Octavio Pisano as Detective Joe Velasco (Note: Pisano appeared as a series regular for the first three episodes and appeared as a special guest star during the seventeenth and twentieth episodes.)
- Kevin Kane as Detective Terry Bruno
- Aimé Donna Kelly as Captain Renee Curry
- Kelli Giddish as Sergeant Amanda Rollins
- Corey Cott as Detective Jake Griffin (Note: Cott appeared as a guest star in episodes two through eight and became a series regular starting with the ninth episode.)

=== Recurring ===
- Noma Dumezweni as Chief Kathryn Tynan
- Norma Kuhling as Assistant District Attorney Cindy "CJ" Jones

=== Guest stars ===
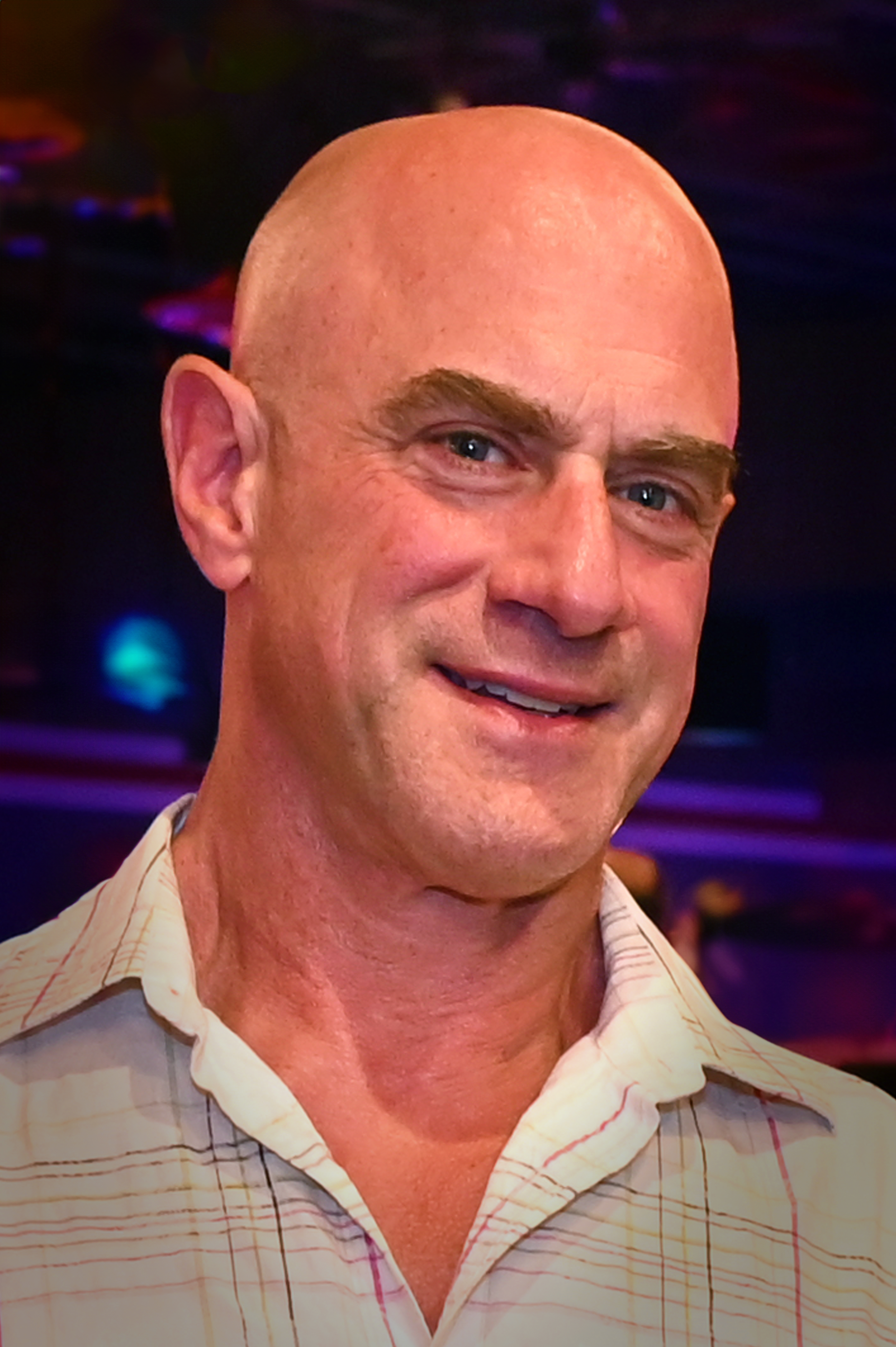
Christopher Meloni (pictured) reprised his role as Detective Elliot Stabler during the season's premiere episode.

In early August 2025, NBC announced former cast members Dean Winters, BD Wong and Dann Florek would make guest appearances as former Detective Brian Cassidy, former FBI Agent George Huang, and former Captain Donald Cragen, respectively. Christopher Meloni (Det. Elliot Stabler) made an appearance during the season's premiere episode. Tony Goldwyn, who stars in the flagship series as District Attorney Nicholas Baxter, will appear in several episodes throughout the season. In addition to Goldwyn, David Ajala (Junior Detective Theo Walker), Hugh Dancy (EADA Nolan Price), and Maura Tierney (Lieutenant Jessica Brady) featured in the season's ninth episode, which served as the second part of a crossover episode with the flagship series.

In addition to the guest appearances by former cast members, early episodes saw Molly Griggs, and Michael Cassidy guest star. On September 11, 2025, it was announced former Chicago Med actress, Norma Kuhling, would appear during the season in a recurring role. The sixth episode saw Drew Garrett playing Paul Ellis, who becomes one of two suspects in an investigation following an attack at a house party.

Greg Germann returned to his role as defense attorney Derek Strauss; he originated the role during the fourteenth season, making infrequent appearances since. His appearance occurred during the ninth episode, "Purity".

Ethan Cutkosky reprised the role of Henry Mesner during the eleventh episode, "Career Psychopath". He first played the role during the fourteenth season and reprised the role during the twenty-second season. Giddish expressed excitement about working with Cutkosky for a third time: "It was so good to see him. [...] And of course, doing the scenes, we've got that history and that's always so much fun to play with." Scanavino referred to the episode as one of showcasing growth with the characters involved. The return was teased on social media in December 2025. The following month, it was announced Sean Patrick Thomas would appear during the season. He made his appearance during the thirteenth episode, "Hubris", as a father attempting to reunite with his daughter (guest star Milan Marsh).

The season's thirteenth episode saw Zayas guest star as Warren Fels, a judge who is also a longtime mentor to Carisi. Ross Partridge and Dan Thompson also guest star as a father, Robbie Miller, who accuses Warren of sexually assaulting his son, Matt Miller, respectively. Melissa McCarthy made a surprise guest-starring appearance during the eighteenth episode as Jasmyn Jewell, a professional fighter who flirts with Hargitay's Olivia. Mark Rolston also guest-starred in the episode. The nineteenth episode saw Monica Potter guest star as Talia Federov, the daughter of a former New York judge, who uses her father's name to avoid the SVU from searching her home. The episode also featured the return of Peter Hermann as D.A. Trevor Langan, a role he first debuted in during the third season and last appeared in during the twenty-third season.

== Episodes ==
Law & Order: Special Victims Unit season 27 episodes
No. overall	No. in season	Title	Directed by	Written by	Original release date	Prod. code	U.S. viewers (millions)
574	1	"In the Wind"	Brenna Malloy	Michele Fazekas	September 25, 2025	2701	3.83
Olivia Benson is reunited with George Huang and Brian Cassidy at a memorial for Donald Cragen. While off-duty, Fin is attacked while trying to stop an assault. The squad tries to protect their key witness to a rape trial, while Olivia is tested by the presence of the newly-installed chief of detectives.
575	2	"A Waiver of Consent"	Juan José Campanella	Kevin J. Hynes	October 2, 2025	2702	3.89
The SVU investigates an assault of a club member.: The episode features two different endings. During the broadcast edit, after speaking with Jake, Olivia is approached by Terry, who tells her Elliot is in the hospital, as a transition to the subsequent airing of Law & Order: Organized Crime. In the Peacock release, after speaking with Benson, Griff arrives at an undisclosed location, where Kathryn is expecting him.; First appearance of Corey Cott as Detective Jake Griffin
576	3	"A Vicious Circle"	Oscar René Lozoya II	Brant Englestein	October 9, 2025	2703	3.06
Terry believes that a bomb was planted to eliminate DNA evidence in a rape case. Meanwhile, Olivia is involved in a murder investigation linked to the bombing, and Jake faces the frustrating challenges that come with working on an SVU case.: Octavio Pisano departed the role of Detective Joe Velasco at the conclusion of the episode.
577	4	"Clickbait"	Norberto Barba	Kevin Deiboldt	October 16, 2025	2704	3.55
When a preadolescent experiences a life-threatening miscarriage, the SVU must untangle online fabrications to identify a suspect. Meanwhile, Amanda carefully considers her career options.
578	5	"Feed the Craving"	Brenna Malloy	Roxanne Paredes	October 23, 2025	2705	3.49
The SVU investigates the kidnapping of a doula's client who claims she is about to deliver a stillborn baby conceived through rape. Upon her unharmed return and hospitalization, doctors confirm her non-pregnancy, leading the squad to scrutinize her account. Further investigation reveals she had posed as a pregnant rape victim to previous doulas, manipulating them into performing sexual acts under the guise of inducing labor.
579	6	"Under the Influence"	Norberto Barba	Nicholas Evangelista	October 30, 2025	2706	3.71
The SVU investigates an assault that occurred during a house party, where no one is able to identify the assailant.
580	7	"False Idols"	Steve Boyum	Justine Ferrara	November 13, 2025	2707	3.51
The SVU faces the challenge of distinguishing fact from fiction when a renowned author alters the details of a serious crime; meanwhile, Fin encounters a difficult day at work.
581	8	"Showdown"	Juan José Campanella	Kevin J. Hynes	November 20, 2025	2708	3.62
A man reports that his girlfriend has been kidnapped, prompting Terry to investigate inconsistencies in his account. Kathryn confronts Olivia sharply following a disagreement. Meanwhile, Jake is required to defend his police work in court.
582	9	"Purity" "Snowflakes (Part 2)"	Jean de Segonzac	Kevin Deiboldt	January 8, 2026	2709	3.95
The search for a murder suspect reveals a crime with disturbing legal and ethical consequences. Carisi and Nolan Price collaborate in court as Lt. Brady's interrogation methods jeopardize the integrity of the case.: Cott is promoted to series regular.; Note: This episode concludes a crossover event that begins on Law & Order season 25 episode 9.
583	10	"Fidelis ad mortem"	Oscar René Lozoya II	Roxanne Paredes	January 15, 2026	2711	3.96
When Renee's son discovers a troubling cassette tape among thrift store finds, she and Olivia are compelled to investigate a decades-old missing persons case. Meanwhile, Jake uncovers a disturbing rumor about his father.
584	11	"Career Psychopath"	Michael Smith	Nicholas Evangelista	January 22, 2026	2712	4.04
Amanda and Carisi are attacked in their home, and they suspect it may be linked to Henry Mesner. Meanwhile, Olivia reaches out to George Wong, asking him to come out of retirement before he too is attacked.
585	12	"Hubris"	Juan José Campanella	Michele Fazekas	January 29, 2026	2713	4.01
Olivia assists in reuniting Nate Williams with his daughter after she is taken from his care due to a doctor's assessment of him as an unfit parent. This situation prompts Carisi and CJ to confront the foster care system for its practices in separating families without adequate justification.
586	13	"Corrosive"	Martha Mitchell	Brant Englestein	February 26, 2026	2710	3.74
A respected judge and former mentor of Carisi gets shot after an anonymous video surfaces directly to SVU, accusing Judge Warren Fels of sexual assault. The investigation, in both the shooting and the claim, leads the squad to a couple of college students, including Dan Thompson whose father Robbie Miller is living in the dorm with them and manipulating their perception of events through psychological manipulation to create a false resentment against the judge due to his past history with the father.
587	14	"Frequency"	Brenna Malloy	Brant Englestein	March 5, 2026	2714	3.63
After a family's baby monitor picks up a rogue connection showing a young boy in danger, the SVU searches for him, with Jake going to great lengths to communicate with the nonverbal child. Meanwhile, Amanda confronts a dangerous suspect.
588	15	"Thirsty"	Michael Smith	Kevin J. Hynes	March 12, 2026	2715	3.57
The SVU investigates a rape and murder at a fan convention. As their investigation continues, they discover more insidious things happening at the hands of one dancer's own mother. Additionally, Renee turns down a job offer from Kathryn.
589	16	"Vivid"	Norberto Barba	Roxanne Paredes	April 2, 2026	2716	3.15
April Deieso, a VTuber known as "Jaded_Ember", confesses during one of her livestreams that she was sexually assaulted. Her confession leads two of her fans to vandalize the car of her ex-boyfriend, who is assumed to be her rapist. As the SVU investigates Deieso, they uncover a much bigger crime involving a psychedelic therapy drug.
590	17	"Deep Under"	Juan José Campanella	Nicholas Evangelista	April 9, 2026	2717	3.61
A surprised Olivia finds former Detective Joe Velasco at the center of a dangerous undercover DEA sex trafficking bust. Joe must navigate treacherous cartel leaders while the SVU works to rescue trafficked women, including a victim's sister.
591	18	"Gimmick"	Norberto Barba	Kevin Deiboldt	April 23, 2026	2718	3.41
While investigating the death of a rising star in the professional fighting world, Olivia and the SVU discover a sexual abuse case involving a high-profile figure Clint "The Red Hand" O'Neill, and the complicated history the two shared.
592	19	"Impropriety"	Jean de Segonzac	Ben Gaspin & Sarah Fiori	April 30, 2026	2719	3.58
After a teenage girl is found drugged with lorazepam outside a hospital, the SVU investigates the circumstances surrounding the incident. As the investigation unfolds, it reveals a complicated history between the girl and a retired judge. During the trial, things become complicated when Olivia is arrested for contempt of court. Following her arrest, Kathryn suspends Olivia from her position.
593	20	"Old Friends"	Juan José Campanella	Justine Ferrara	May 7, 2026	2720	3.65
A drug-fueled college reunion among a handful of friends leads to a sexual assault in the early morning hours. Tynan appoints Fin supervisor of the SVU in Olivia's absence, and he takes the lead in the case. But Olivia returns after receiving a stay from the union, allowing her to assist in the investigation.
594	21	"Monster"	Brenna Malloy	Michele Fazekas	May 14, 2026	2721	4.11
A rookie cop makes a procedural error when arresting a child predator who was caught with a missing boy in his trunk, allowing the man, Richard Caine, to walk. SVU detectives are left trying to find a way to get Caine back into custody as soon as possible. However, Griffin takes a bullet when he arrests Caine for a second time. The truth about what Tynan did years ago finally comes out.

== Reception ==
=== Ratings ===
Viewership and ratings per episode of Law & Order: Special Victims Unit season 27 ratings
No.	Title	Air date	Rating/share (18–49)	Viewers (millions)	DVR (18–49)	DVR viewers (millions)	Total (18–49)	Total viewers (millions)	Ref.
1	"In the Wind"	September 25, 2025	0.3/3	3.83	—N/a	—N/a	0.2	5.54	
2	"A Waiver of Consent"	October 2, 2025	0.3/3	3.89	—N/a	—N/a	0.5	5.42	
3	"A Vicious Circle"	October 9, 2025	0.2/2	3.06	—N/a	—N/a	0.4	4.73	
4	"Clickbait"	October 16, 2025	0.3/3	3.55	—N/a	—N/a	0.5	5.19	
5	"Feed the Craving"	October 23, 2025	0.3/4	3.49	—N/a	—N/a	0.5	5.05	
6	"Under the Influence"	October 30, 2025	0.3/3	3.71	—N/a	—N/a	0.4	5.12	
7	"False Idols"	November 13, 2025	0.3/4	3.51	—N/a	—N/a	—N/a	—N/a	
8	"Showdown"	November 20, 2025	0.3/4	3.62	—N/a	—N/a	—N/a	—N/a	
9	"Purity"	January 8, 2026	0.3/4	3.95	—N/a	—N/a	—N/a	—N/a	
10	"Fidelis ad mortem"	January 15, 2026	0.3/5	3.96	—N/a	—N/a	—N/a	—N/a	
11	"Career Psychopath"	January 22, 2026	0.3/5	4.04	—N/a	—N/a	—N/a	—N/a	
12	"Hubris"	January 29, 2026	0.4/5	4.01	—N/a	—N/a	—N/a	—N/a	
13	"Corrosive"	February 26, 2026	0.3/4	3.74	—N/a	—N/a	—N/a	—N/a	
14	"Frequency"	March 5, 2026	0.3/4	3.63	—N/a	—N/a	—N/a	—N/a	
15	"Thirsty"	March 12, 2026	0.3/4	3.57	—N/a	—N/a	—N/a	—N/a	
16	"Vivid"	April 2, 2026	0.3/4	3.15	—N/a	—N/a	—N/a	—N/a	
17	"Deep Under"	April 9, 2026	0.3/4	3.61	—N/a	—N/a	—N/a	—N/a	
18	"Gimmick"	April 23, 2026	0.3/3	3.41	—N/a	—N/a	—N/a	—N/a	
19	"Impropriety"	April 30, 2026	0.3/3	3.58	—N/a	—N/a	—N/a	—N/a	
20	"Old Friends"	May 7, 2026	0.3/4	3.65	—N/a	—N/a	—N/a	—N/a	
21	"Monster"	May 14, 2026	0.3/5	4.11	—N/a	—N/a	—N/a	—N/a	

=== Political response ===
The season's premiere episode drew criticism from some in conservative media following the depiction of agents from the United States Immigration and Customs Enforcement (ICE). In review for Media Research Center's NewsBusters, Elise Ehrhard noted the depiction of ICE agents as "cold-hearted villains" who had hindered SVU's investigation in a rape case. She further condemned Hollywood for fueling the flames of the attacks against ICE agents and facilities, calling it "irresponsible". Katie Miller further accused the series for being responsible for the ongoing attacks following the episode's premiere. The Daily Beast noted comparison to Hargitay's character arresting a key witness in a rape investigation to the real-life arrest of Kilmar Abrego Garcia in March 2025. Megyn Kelly also found issue with the episode's depiction of ICE agents, calling it "propaganda".

The Trump Administration felt the series villainized ICE. In a statement to Fox News' digital agency, U.S. Department of Homeland Security's assistant secretary Tricia McLaughlin said: "Not even a week ago, Our ICE law enforcement was shot up by a deranged lunatic who wanted to terrorize ICE and not even a week later Law and Order: SVU's releases an episode that further villainize our brave ICE law enforcement. NBC and Hollywood elites must stop fanning the flames of division. Our ICE law enforcement work night and day to protect Americans, including by removing rapists and child molesters from America's streets. Our officers are facing a more than 1000% increase in assaults against them. This is irresponsible and pathetic."
