= Lazy Susan (film) =

2020 American comedy film

- Directed by: Nick Peet
- Written by: Carrie Aizley; Sean Hayes; Darlene Hunt
- Produced by: Todd Milliner; Carl Moellenberg; Shane O'Brien; Zach O'Brien
- Starring: Sean Hayes
- Cinematography: Ludovic Littee
- Edited by: Benjamin Moses Smith
- Music by: Scott Icenogle
- Production companies: Stargazer Films USA; Hazy Mills Productions; Dominion Pictures
- Distributed by: Shout! Studios
- Release date: April 3, 2020
- Running time: 90 minutes
- Country: United States
- Language: English

Lazy Susan is a 2020 American comedy film directed by Nick Peet and starring Sean Hayes.

== Plot ==
A frumpy, bumbling, unmotivated woman named Susan always manages to get herself into the most ridiculous situations imaginable. One day, Susan wakes up to realize that her relationships have all tanked, her family is estranged, and she has no prospects. She decides to take charge and turn things around but finds that becoming a better woman on her own is difficult.

== Cast ==
- Sean Hayes as Susan O'Connell
  - Carys McGrory as Young Susan O'Connell
- Allison Janney as Velvet Swensen
- Matthew Broderick as Doug
- Carrie Aizley as Corrine
- Margo Martindale as Mary O'Connell
- Jim Rash as Phil
- Kiel Kennedy as Cameron O'Connell
  - Timothy Woods as Young Cameron O'Connell
- Danny Johnson as Leon
- Darlene Hunt as Wendy O’Connell
- Skipp Sudduth as Tom
- J. R. Ramirez as Carl "Coyote Carl"
- Matty Cardarople as Roger
- Maria Shriver as herself
- Tony D. Head as Officer Williams
- Ryan Buggle as Andy

== Reception ==
The film has a 10% rating on Rotten Tomatoes, based on 10 reviews with an average rating of 3.8/10.
