= Law & Order: Special Victims Unit season 23 =

Season of American television series

Law & Order: Special Victims Unit
- Season 23
- Season 23 U.S. DVD cover
- Starring: Mariska Hargitay; Kelli Giddish; Ice-T; Peter Scanavino; Jamie Gray Hyder; Demore Barnes; Octavio Pisano
- No. of episodes: 22

Release
- Original network: NBC
- Original release: September 23, 2021 – May 19, 2022

Season chronology
- ← Previous; Season 22 Next → Season 24

The twenty-third season of the American crime-drama television series Law & Order: Special Victims Unit was ordered on February 27, 2020, by NBC. It was set to air during the 2021–2022 television season, the season was produced by Wolf Entertainment and Universal Television; the showrunner was Warren Leight, in the third and final season of his second stint in the role. The season premiered on September 23, 2021, and concluded on May 19, 2022. The series' milestone 500th episode aired this season as the sixth episode and saw the return of former Detective Nick Amaro and former SVU Captain Don Cragen. This is the last season for Jamie Gray Hyder and Demore Barnes as they departed in the premiere episode. The season consisted of 22 episodes.

== Cast ==
=== Main ===
- Mariska Hargitay as Captain Olivia Benson
- Kelli Giddish as Senior Detective Amanda Rollins
- Ice-T as Senior Detective Sergeant Odafin "Fin" Tutuola
- Peter Scanavino as Assistant District Attorney Dominick "Sonny" Carisi, Jr.
- Jamie Gray Hyder as Junior Detective Katriona "Kat" Tamin (episodes 1–2)
- Demore Barnes as Deputy Chief Christian Garland (episodes 1–2, guest: episode 19)
- Octavio Pisano as Junior Detective Joe Velasco (episodes 7–22; guest star: episodes 1–2, 4)

=== Special guest stars after their departure ===
- Tamara Tunie as Chief Medical Examiner Melinda Warner (episode 6 – the 500th episode of SVU)
- Danny Pino as Former Detective Nick Amaro (episode 6)
- Dann Florek as Former Captain Donald Cragen (episode 6)
- Raúl Esparza as Defense Attorney (former Assistant District Attorney) Rafael Barba (episodes 9, 22)
- Donal Logue as Captain Declan Murphy (episode 10)

=== Crossover stars from Law & Order: Organized Crime ===
- Christopher Meloni as Organized Crime Control Bureau Senior Detective Elliot Stabler
- Danielle Moné Truitt as Organized Crime Control Bureau Sergeant Ayanna Bell
- Ainsley Seiger as Organized Crime Control Bureau Junior Detective Jet Slootmaekers
- Dylan McDermott as Richard Wheatley
- Tamara Taylor as Professor Angela Wheatley
- Nick Creegan as Richard "Richie" Wheatley, Jr.
- Allison Siko as Kathleen Stabler
- Nicky Torchia as Elliot "Eli" Stabler, Jr.
- Jeffrey Scaperrotta as Richard "Dickie" Stabler

=== Recurring ===
- Adrian Alvarado as Detective Ray Fernandez
- Jason Biggs as Detective Andy Parlato-Goldstein
- Teagle F. Bougere as Bureau Chief Assistant District Attorney Phillip Baptiste
- Stephen C. Bradbury as Judge Colin McNamara
- Betty Buckley as Trial Division Chief Assistant District Attorney Lorraine Maxwell
- Ryan Buggle as Noah Porter-Benson
- Michael Dempsey as Elvis Baktashi
- Ryan Garbayo as Ruben Ortiz
- Joe Grifasi as Judge Hashi Horowitz
- Saverio Guerra as Paulie Banducci
- Zabryna Guevara as Dr. Catalina Machado
- Eddie Hargitay as Officer Eddie Montero
- Peter Hermann as Defense Attorney Trevor Langan
- Christine Toy Johnson as Dr. Celia Lee
- Aime Donna Kelly as Internal Affairs Bureau Captain Renee Curry
- Carrie Kim as Celine Tatou
- TJ Lee as Celia Long
- Michael Mastro as Judge D. Serani
- Aidan Quinn as Burton Lowe
- Ben Rappaport as Congressman George Howard
- Cyndee Rivera as Detective Mia Ruz
- Kadia Saraf as United States Attorney Anya Avital
- Jeffrey Schecter as Counselor Art Blumfeld
- Terry Serpico as Chief Tommy McGrath
- Ari'el Stachel as Sergeant Hasim Khaldun
- Aida Turturro as Judge Felicia Catano
- Frank Wood as Medical Examiner Abel Truman
- Angelic Zambrana as Rosa Estrada

== Episodes ==
Law & Order: Special Victims Unit season 23 episodes
No. overall	No. in season	Title	Directed by	Written by	Original release date	Prod. code	U.S. viewers (millions)
495	1	"And the Empire Strikes Back"	Norberto Barba	Warren Leight & Julie Martin & Bryan Goluboff	September 23, 2021	2301	5.57
When a powerful congressman (Ben Rappaport) is using his political instincts to traffic girls, Benson and the Special Victims Unit race against the clock to put him away for life but the case may be harder than they thought. Benson faces a major dilemma when her loyalty to Garland is tested over the backfired Jayvon Brown case. Meanwhile, Detective Joe Velasco (Octavio Pisano) joins the SVU squad when he is assigned to the case by Chief McGrath (Terry Serpico). Also, a suspicious car accident puts Benson's life in danger.
496	2	"Never Turn Your Back on Them"	Norberto Barba	Teleplay by : Julie Martin & Bryan Goluboff; Story by : Warren Leight	September 23, 2021	2302	5.57
The Special Victims Unit faces a major setback when one of the witnesses of Congressman Howard is missing and the others dead or threatened. It leads Fin and Kat down a dangerous path which puts Kat's life in danger. Meanwhile, Rollins and Carisi determine the status of their relationship. Kat resigns from the Special Victims Unit after her accident made her realize that change is not worth her to stay and Benson become even more distraught when she realizes that Garland is also resigning as Deputy Chief after what happened with the Javon Brown case.
497	3	"I Thought You Were on My Side"	John Behring	Teleplay by : Julie Martin & Warren Leight; Story by : Bryan Goluboff	September 30, 2021	2303	4.66
Benson and Rollins must contend with the FBI and the Organized Crime Control Bureau when a rape victim (Herizen Guardiola) identifies a dangerous mobster (Rhys Coiro) as her assailant. Unfortunately, the Special Victims Unit realizes that the perp is way more connected than they originally thought, further complicating things for the victim. The FBI and the OCCB want to take down the head of a crime family with his help. When they take down the alleged assailant, Stabler shoots him, putting him in the hospital. When Carisi goes to see the perp, the US Marshalls have taken him out. The SVU doesn't know whether or not to trust Stabler and Bell after the outcome of the case. Note: This episode begins a crossover event that continues on Law & Order: Organized Crime season 2 episode 2 and concludes on Law & Order: Organized Crime season 2 episode 3.
498	4	"One More Tale of Two Victims"	Michael Pressman	Teleplay by : Denis Hamill & Monet Hurst-Mendoza; Story by : Denis Hamill & Bryan Goluboff	October 7, 2021	2304	3.88
Benson and Fin faces the tight reins of Chief McGrath when the SVU squad searches for a serial rapist who preys on mothers with young children. Meanwhile, Velasco is not receiving a warm welcome into the precinct when the squad uncovers that he may be a spy for McGrath.
499	5	"Fast Times @DIGGYSPENTHOUSE"	Martha Mitchell	Brianna Yellen & Brendan Feeney	October 14, 2021	2305	3.96
The SVU squad is dragged into the world of social media when a rape victim (Lena Torluemke) is assaulted by two popular influencers (Jakob Winter and Conor Sweeney). When the victim's friend (Taylor Trensch) is unable to come forward, he does everything in his power to make it right. Originally aired as Fast Times @TheWheelHouse Note: This episode begins a crossover event that concludes on Law & Order: Organized Crime season 2 episode 5.
500	6	"The Five Hundredth Episode"	Juan J. Campanella	Teleplay by : Brianna Yellen & Julie Martin; Story by : Brianna Yellen & Warren Leight	October 21, 2021	2306	3.89
Detective Nick Amaro (Danny Pino) returns to the Special Victims Unit after six years not only to reunite with his former squad members but to reopen a case that places Benson with someone from her past (Aidan Quinn) in order to clear a convicted man's name for rape but there may be a secret from his past that causes friction with Benson. Meanwhile, former Captain Donald Cragen (Dann Florek) helps the squad with the case.
501	7	"They'd Already Disappeared"	Bethany Rooney	Kathy Dobie & Micharne Cloughley	November 4, 2021	2307	4.42
When a teenage sex worker disappears, Rollins and Velasco find a key clue in a pile of neglected missing persons reports and discover they are dealing with a serial killer.
502	8	"Nightmares in Drill City"	Norberto Barba	Bryan Goluboff	November 11, 2021	2308	3.71
Carisi asks SVU for help with a murder investigation when one of the witnesses (Alison Thornton) shows signs of abuse which causes Benson and SVU to investigate.
503	9	"People vs. Richard Wheatley"	Michael Smith	Teleplay by : Brendan Feeney & Monet Hurst-Mendoza & Candice Sanchez McFarlane; Story by : Julie Martin & Warren Leight	December 9, 2021	2309	3.49
Carisi tries Richard Wheatley (Dylan McDermott) for the murder of Kathy Stabler. After his continuous change of lawyers, Rafael Barba (Raúl Esparza) ends up defending him. Benson finds herself with Barba when she discovers he's taking the case. After testimony from Angela Wheatley, Richie Wheatley, Sergeant Bell, and even Stabler, who is put in contempt of court, the case goes to mistrial and Stabler has to find out where his son is. Note: This episode begins a crossover event that concludes on Law & Order: Organized Crime season 2 episode 9.
504	10	"Silent Night, Hateful Night"	Norberto Barba	Teleplay by : Julie Martin & Kathy Dobie & Warren Leight; Story by : Warren Leight	January 6, 2022	2310	4.08
The SVU is called in to help investigate a wave of hate crimes on Christmas Eve, assisting the Hate Crimes unit now led by Declan Murphy (Donal Logue). Murphy wants to come to a resolution with Rollins about whether he wants to be in his daughter Jessie's life.
505	11	"Burning with Rage Forever"	Mary Lambert	Brianna Yellen & Brendan Feeney	January 13, 2022	2311	4.22
A boy disappears after meeting up with an online gamer which soon leads to a deeper secret regarding his uncle Carlos Guzman (Christian Navarro). Benson suspects her son Noah is being bullied by a neighborhood teen and comes out with a secret of his own.
506	12	"Tommy Baker's Hardest Fight"	Ed Bianchi	Candice Sanchez McFarlane & Bryan Goluboff	January 20, 2022	2312	4.31
When a popular fighter (Cole Doman) doesn't show up for the biggest bout of the year, Rollins and Velasco are drawn into a complicated web of secrets leading to the man's closeted sexuality. McGrath confides in Benson regarding his teenage daughter who is drinking and behaving erratically.
507	13	"If I Knew Then What I Know Now"	Juan J. Campanella	Teleplay by : Micharne Cloughley & Julie Martin; Story by : Micharne Cloughley & Warren Leight	February 24, 2022	2313	5.15
A young woman (Gates Leonard) learning about her birth parents asks Benson for help. Carisi and Rollins weigh the risks of taking their relationship public.
508	14	"Video Killed the Radio Star"	Alex Zakrzewski	Teleplay by : Denis Hamill & Monet Hurst-Mendoza; Story by : Warren Leight & Julie Martin	March 3, 2022	2314	4.50
SVU investigates a popular radio show host and author (Jake Weber) accused of molesting the wives of the wealthy and powerful men he has mingled with at various events. Rollins goes undercover to get information but it turns into a murder investigation when he brags about having sex with the widows of his alleged victims. The episode is dedicated to the memory of Ned Eisenberg.
509	15	"Promising Young Gentlemen"	David Grossman	Teleplay by : Kathy Dobie & Candice Sanchez McFarlane & Brianna Yellen; Story by : Julie Martin & Warren Leight	March 10, 2022	2315	4.51
Rollins meets Carisi's mother (Beverly D'Angelo) for the first time at his childhood home. After leaving the dinner party, Carisi's niece Mia (Ryann Shane) calls him for help because her friend (Avery Cole) was raped. Carisi encourages them to report it, which leads Benson to investigate a college's secret society that preys on female students.
510	16	"Sorry If It Got Weird for You"	Leslie Hope	Teleplay by : Brendan Feeney & Matt Klypka; Story by : Bryan Goluboff & Brendan Feeney	March 17, 2022	2316	4.71
After a date where Velasco meets a woman (Christine Spang) through a dating app, Velasco discovers she is a rape victim. She later learns her abuser, the app's creator (Jon Glaser) had raped another woman a couple years prior, the victim's godmother (Sherri Saum) and later struggles to cope with the abuse when she takes matters into her own hands. Meanwhile, Velasco finds himself in the witness stand and his judgement being questioned.
511	17	"Once Upon a Time in El Barrio"	Oscar René Lozoya II	Teleplay by : Denis Hamill & Monet Hurst-Mendoza; Story by : Bryan Goluboff & Denis Hamill	April 7, 2022	2317	4.33
Velasco's former parish priest in Mexico calls him for help when three girls from his hometown go missing in New York City. Benson and the team find themselves up against a trafficking ring backed by a violent cartel.
512	18	"Eighteen Wheels a Predator"	Martha Mitchell	Teleplay by : Brianna Yellen & Monet Hurst-Mendoza; Story by : Kathy Dobie	April 14, 2022	2318	4.74
Rollins and Fin investigate an assault in Kentucky that has striking similarities to a victim found in Central Park. As they uncover more cases in other states, they soon realize that there is an elusive serial rapist on the loose.
513	19	"Tangled Strands of Justice"	Jean de Segonzac	Teleplay by : Warren Leight & Julie Martin; Story by : Brendan Feeney	April 28, 2022	2319	4.89
Garland asks Benson to reopen a missing person case he worked as a rookie, and a victim in Carisi's case is arrested.
514	20	"Did You Believe in Miracles?"	Pratibha Parmar	Teleplay by : Micharne Cloughley & Victoria Pollack; Story by : Micharne Cloughley & Candice Sanchez McFarlane	May 5, 2022	2320	4.90
When a student's school reports a girl missing, the squad must track down a trusted family friend for answers. Benson gets a Mother's Day surprise from Noah and he meets Stabler for the first time. Note: This episode begins a crossover event that concludes on Law & Order: Organized Crime season 2 episode 20.
515	21	"Confess Your Sins to Be Free"	Norberto Barba	Teleplay by : Julie Martin & Christian Tyler; Story by : Denis Hamill & Warren Leight	May 12, 2022	2321	4.50
When the only evidence in a crime is a church confession, Carisi must find another way to prove his suspect guilty. Burton Lowe reappears to make things right with Benson.
516	22	"A Final Call at Forlini's Bar"	Juan J. Campanella	Warren Leight & Julie Martin	May 19, 2022	2322	4.52
A domestic violence victim winds up at the defendant's table and Rollins surprises Carisi with formidable opponent Rafael Barba. Benson struggles with forgiving Barba for defending Wheatley and grapples with her own feelings.

== Ratings ==
Viewership and ratings per episode of Law & Order: Special Victims Unit season 23
No.	Title	Air date	Rating/share (18–49)	Viewers (millions)	DVR (18–49)	DVR viewers (millions)	Total (18–49)	Total viewers (millions)
1–2	"And the Empire Strikes Back" / "Never Turn Your Back on Them"	September 23, 2021	0.8	5.57	0.4	1.81	1.2	7.39 (Note: Live+7 ratings were not available, so Live+3 ratings have been used instead.)
3	"I Thought You Were on My Side"	September 30, 2021	0.7	4.66	0.3	1.61	1.1	6.27
4	"One More Tale of Two Victims"	October 7, 2021	0.6	3.88	0.4	1.79	1.1	5.67
5	"Fast Times @TheWheelHouse"	October 14, 2021	0.7	3.96	0.5	2.12	1.2	6.08
6	"The Five Hundredth Episode"	October 21, 2021	0.6	3.89	0.6	2.42	1.2	6.31
7	"They'd Already Disappeared"	November 4, 2021	0.7	4.42	—N/a	—N/a	—N/a	—N/a
8	"Nightmares in Drill City"	November 11, 2021	0.6	3.71	—N/a	—N/a	—N/a	—N/a
9	"People vs. Richard Wheatley"	December 9, 2021	0.6	3.49	0.6	2.58	1.1	6.06
10	"Silent Night, Hateful Night"	January 6, 2022	0.6	4.08	—N/a	—N/a	—N/a	—N/a
11	"Burning with Rage Forever"	January 13, 2022	0.7	4.22	—N/a	—N/a	—N/a	—N/a
12	"Tommy Baker's Hardest Fight"	January 20, 2022	0.6	4.31	—N/a	—N/a	—N/a	—N/a
13	"If I Knew Then What I Know Now"	February 24, 2022	0.7	5.15	—N/a	—N/a	—N/a	—N/a
14	"Video Killed the Radio Star"	March 3, 2022	0.7	4.50	—N/a	—N/a	—N/a	—N/a
15	"Promising Young Gentlemen"	March 10, 2022	0.7	4.51	—N/a	—N/a	—N/a	—N/a
16	"Sorry If It Got Weird for You"	March 17, 2022	0.7	4.71	—N/a	—N/a	—N/a	—N/a
17	"Once Upon a Time in El Barrio"	April 7, 2022	0.6	4.33	—N/a	—N/a	—N/a	—N/a
18	"Eighteen Wheels a Predator"	April 14, 2022	0.6	4.74	0.6	2.40	1.2	7.14
19	"Tangled Strands of Justice"	April 28, 2022	0.6	4.89	—N/a	—N/a	—N/a	—N/a
20	"Did You Believe in Miracles?"	May 5, 2022	0.6	4.90	—N/a	—N/a	—N/a	—N/a
21	"Confess Your Sins to Be Free"	May 12, 2022	0.6	4.50	—N/a	—N/a	—N/a	—N/a
22	"A Final Call at Forlini's Bar"	May 19, 2022	0.6	4.52	—N/a	—N/a	—N/a	—N/a
