= Fin Tutuola =

Fictional character on Law & Order: Special Victims Unit

- Law & Order character
- First appearance: "Wrong Is Right" (2000)
- Portrayed by: Ice-T

In-universe information
- Full name: Odafin Tutuola
- Title(s): NYPD Detective (Seasons 2–8); NYPD Senior Detective (Seasons 9–19); NYPD Sergeant (Seasons 19–present)
- Spouses: Teresa Randall (divorced); Sgt. Phoebe Baker (fiancée)
- Children: Ken Randall
- Relatives: Iggy Tutuola (grandfather); Unnamed brother Jaden Pavel-Randall (grandson); Alejandro Pavel (son-in-law)
- Partner: John Munch; Olivia Benson; Chester Lake; Amanda Rollins; Dominick Carisi, Jr. Terry Bruno
- Seasons: 2, 3, 4, 5, 6, 7, 8, 9, 10, 11, 12, 13, 14, 15, 16, 17, 18, 19, 20, 21, 22, 23, 24, 25, 26, 27

Odafin "Fin" Tutuola is a fictional character on the TV drama Law & Order: Special Victims Unit, portrayed by rapper Ice-T. He is a sergeant with the New York Police Department's Special Victims Unit. Tutuola is the second-most frequently appearing character in the Law & Order franchise, having appeared in 456 episodes of SVU, behind only Olivia Benson.

== Background ==
Fin was raised in the Harlem area of New York City and was six years old during the 1968 riots following the Martin Luther King Jr. assassination, making his birth year 1961 or 1962. He has mentioned having a brother. His grandfather Iggy is still alive, though suffering from diabetes.

When he was a child, Fin witnessed his mother's murder at the hands of a business rival of his father's, a petty criminal; 30 years later, while investigating an unrelated case, he discovered that his mother's killer was himself murdered.

According to the Season 11 episode "Disabled", Fin, while still in the police academy, was forced by circumstances to place his maternal grandfather, whom he credits for raising him, in a nursing home. His grandfather later died as a result of abuse from the staff. Tutuola later describes institutionalizing his grandfather as "the worst decision [he] ever made"; in his grief, rage, and guilt, he started fights with fellow officers "for the hell of it" and was almost kicked off the force until an academy instructor intervened and helped him salvage his career.

Fin was previously a U.S. Army Ranger and served on two tours. His military background remains sketchy, as he rarely speaks of it or only makes vague and indirect references to it; however, in season 10, in order to connect with a military rape victim, he explicitly mentions serving on Operation Gothic Serpent in Somalia.

Fin is an avid fan of first-person shooter video games and is a regular at an annual video-game convention. He explains to his colleagues that he views these games as an escape from the gray areas that he faces in his job; he finds solace in the "black and white" nature of these games, in which he gets to hunt down and defeat a clearly defined "bad guy".

== Work ==
A former narcotics detective, Fin joins the SVU squad in the season 2 premiere "Wrong Is Right", as a replacement for Monique Jeffries (Michelle Hurd). He is then paired with Det. John Munch (Richard Belzer).

While in the Narcotics Division, Fin worked undercover regularly. He would often spend weeks or even months at a time in various alternate identities. He left Narcotics and transferred to SVU when his partner took a bullet that was meant for him.

Fin initially has a rocky relationship with his colleagues in SVU, especially with Munch and Olivia Benson (Mariska Hargitay). Unlike them, he views justice in a "black and white" manner and believes that all criminals should be punished, regardless of the circumstances under which they commit the crime. He also tries to separate his private and professional life as much as possible and keeps a tight rein on his emotions, refusing to talk about his problems or to admit that the grisly nature of his work often affects him. For example, it takes him nearly a year before he opens up to Munch about his former partner getting shot.

During an investigation of prisoner sexual abuse, both Fin and Benson go undercover to Sealview Correctional Facility, and he saves her from being raped by a guard.

In the Season 9 finale "Cold", Detective Elliot Stabler (Christopher Meloni) suspects that Fin tipped off his temporary partner Chester Lake (Adam Beach), who is suspected of murder, before he and Benson could take Lake into custody. Stabler checks Fin's phone records, infuriating him. Near the end of the episode, Stabler apologizes for not trusting him, but Fin dismisses his apology, telling him, "You'll still be the same rat-bastard tomorrow." Afterwards, he requests a transfer from the squad. However, three months later, Fin later learns from Captain Donald Cragen (Dann Florek) that the transfer had become bogged down in red tape, keeping him with SVU: Fin later discovers that the person in charge of transfer paperwork was previously a colleague of his in the narcotics unit who holds a grudge because his ex-wife started calling Fin after their divorce. Hearing this, Fin resigns himself to the likelihood that his transfer will not happen anytime soon. No further mention of his transfer request is made after this point.

Fin and Stabler mend their relationship somewhat, however. While they are never friendly, they do respect each other, and sympathize with each other over the dual burdens they both face from being police officers and fathers. When pedophile Jake Berlin (Tom Noonan) posts a picture of Stabler's daughter on his website, Stabler beats him up, but Fin covers for him and praises him for showing restraint; he later admits to Benson that, had Berlin posted pictures of his child, he would have killed him. Years later, when Stabler, who quit SVU in 2011, returns to New York after spending 10 years in Italy, Fin is the first person he calls.

After Munch retires from SVU, Fin is partnered with Detective Amanda Rollins (Kelli Giddish), who had transferred to Manhattan SVU from a precinct in her native Atlanta, Georgia. They have a good working relationship, but it is tested when Rollins' gambling addiction begins to interfere with her work. When Rollins loses thousands of dollars at an underground casino, Tutuola gives her some money and tells her to get help, and he is the first to defend her when she becomes a suspect in a corruption case involving the casino. When he learns that she had been cooperating in a sting operation, he is hurt that she didn't tell him, and loses some respect for her. They repair their relationship, however, after she reveals that she had been raped years earlier in Atlanta by her then-superior officer, Deputy Chief Charles Patton (Harry Hamlin), who has a long history of sexually abusing the female detectives in his squad. Along with Benson and ADA Rafael Barba (Raúl Esparza), Fin helps her bring Patton to justice for raping his latest victim, Detective Reese Taymor (Dreama Walker).

In "Making a Rapist", DNA evidence exonerates Sean Roberts (Henry Thomas), a man Fin had arrested for rape in 2000. When the evidence of the rape and murder of the victim's daughter points to Roberts, Barba accuses Tutuola of framing Roberts as revenge for tarnishing his arrest record. Roberts is later convicted after he confesses in court.

In the season 19 premiere "Gone Fishin'", Fin recruits some men from Cuba to kidnap fugitive serial rapist Byron Marks (Will Chase) and bring him to New York. Marks' attorney and Cuba's U.N. permanent mission representative accuse Fin of kidnapping Marks and violating extradition laws. When Benson, now a Lieutenant and SVU's commanding officer, demands an explanation, Fin says that he had encountered Marks by chance while vacationing in Cuba, a lie Benson chooses to accept. At the end of the episode, Marks is found guilty of rape and goes to prison.

In a deleted scene from the season 18 episode "Net Worth", it is revealed that Fin passed his sergeant's exam and became an NYPD Sergeant. In "Real Fake News", he and Benson discuss him passing the exam, but he says he is waiting to be appointed. In "Mama", he receives his sergeant's orders to go to the 21st precinct, but he manages to get transferred back to SVU.

In "Sightless in a Savage Land", Fin becomes engaged to Sergeant Phoebe Baker (Jennifer Esposito), his former partner from Narcotics. In "Wolves in Sheep's Clothing", however, they call off the wedding after deciding at the last minute that they like their relationship the way it is.

=== Awards and decorations ===
The following are the medals and service awards worn by Tutuola, as seen in "Dolls".

American Flag Breast Bar
NYPD Combat Cross with gold award star (2nd award)
NYPD Award of Merit
NYPD Unit Citation

== Character evolution ==
Over the 25 seasons that the character has been featured on the show, Fin has come to respect and trust his SVU colleagues, even though they often disagree over the best way to solve cases. An example is his partnership with Munch, that over 13 years grew from icy dislike to mutual respect and good-natured banter, often about politics, as Munch is politically liberal and Fin is a Republican. After Munch is shot in the buttocks by a suspect during a trial, Fin surprises him in the hospital with his favorite fig milkshake. He and Benson are also close friends, and she relies on him as her "second-in-command" when she is promoted to Sergeant, Lieutenant, and, ultimately, Captain.

Fin is shot and gravely wounded while attempting to stop a holdup at a bodega; after being released from the hospital, he spends little time recovering, instead throwing himself back into work finding a kidnapping victim and busting a methamphetamine lab. This episode introduces Tutuola's son Kwasi "Ken" Randall (Ernest Waddell), a computer science student at Hudson University, from whom he is estranged; Fin was always working when Ken was a child, and by his own admission chose work over his family.

While attempting to solve the murders of AIDS victims, Fin seeks assistance from Ken, who helps the SVU squad locate a hacker who fraudulently obtained a list of AIDS patients. In the course of the investigation, Fin learns that Ken himself is gay, which makes Fin uncomfortable. Their relationship is tested again in the episode "Venom", when uniform cops find Ken digging up a city street and arrest him. Ken contacts Benson instead of his father and tells her he is digging up the street to look for the bodies of a dead woman and her baby. The investigation, which first focused on Ken, takes a new turn when DNA evidence shows that Ken's cousin Darius Parker (Chris "Ludacris" Bridges) is not only the murderer but also Ken's older half-brother, who had been abandoned by his mother — Fin’s ex-wife Teresa Randall (LisaGay Hamilton). The episode ends with Darius threatening to expose the entire family's secrets in court. Darius goes on trial for the murders and, true to his word, exposes the family's dirty laundry to the public. Teresa at first refuses to testify, forcing the judge to remand her into custody for contempt of court, but she eventually reveals that Darius is the product of an incestuous rape. Darius is acquitted of all charges, but both Fin and Ken disown him.

Over the years, Fin’s relationship with Ken has improved, with Fin calling him "the bravest man I know". When Ken's fiancé Alejandro (Miguel Govea) is assaulted in a hate crime, Fin takes charge of the investigation, and persuades Alejandro's homophobic father to accept Ken into his family.

In "Intersecting Lives", Fin learns that he is due to be a grandfather, as Ken and Alejandro are expecting a baby via surrogate. In the episode "Send in the Clowns," Ken and Alejandro bring their infant son Jaden to the squadroom for a birthday party.

== Development ==
The character's name is inspired by the Yoruba author Amos Tutuola. Information about Amos Tutuola, recounted in the introduction of The Palm Wine Drinkard, states that his grandfather was an Odafin, the spiritual leader of a clan, and Tutuola was the given name of the author's father; Odafin literally means "the establisher of laws" or "law giver" in the Yoruba language of southwestern Nigeria. Tutuola means "the gentle one".

When Ice-T asked Law & Order series producer Dick Wolf how the part was supposed to be performed, Wolf told him to simply do what Ice-T would do if he were a cop.

== Appearances and crossovers ==
Fin appears in two episodes of Law & Order, three episodes of Chicago P.D., two episodes of Law & Order: Organized Crime, and cameos (not crossovers) in two episodes of 30 Rock.

- Law & Order — episode: "Flaw" (2005), "Snowflakes" (2026)
- 30 Rock — episodes: "¡Qué Sorpresa!" (2011), "Hogcock!" (2013)
- Chicago P.D. — episodes: "Conventions" (2014), "The Number of Rats" (2015), "The Song of Gregory Williams Yates" (2016)
- Law & Order: Organized Crime — episode: "The Good, The Bad, and The Lovely" (2021), "With Many Names" (2023)
