= Crime tourism =

Organized crime phenomenon

Crime tourism is an ongoing, worldwide phenomenon of organized crime where a group of bandits arrive in a foreign country as "tourists", often originating from South America, specifically to target wealthy households, before returning to their country of origin. The phenomenon is not confined to a single cohesive group, but is rather a pattern observed across multiple independent criminal enterprises.

Vanity Fair has reported a wave of this type of crime occurring in California that has been ongoing since 2016, according to an unnamed FBI special agent. The Electronic System for Travel Authorization or ESTA, has been referenced as having enabled this type of crime in the United States as it grants "virtually automatic" 90-day visa waivers to member countries' citizens. California Senate Bill 54 ("SB 54") has also been referenced as a reason for California being a common target, as it limits local authorities' ability to share information with the federal government in the enforcement of immigration law.

As of January 2022, the FBI has a task force dedicated to this crime ring. Arrests have been made in the United States, Australia, and the United Kingdom in connection with these crime rings. According to the FBI, these groups have been operating in the U.S. since the mid-1980s.

== Examples ==
- Herrera-Maldonado gang: Chile → New York; 20+ residential break-ins in Nassau County, estimated at $5M in value
- Vallejos-Vera group: Chile → United Kingdom; 5+ break-ins, estimated value of 170,000 GBP
- Australian syndicate - $1M estimated value
- Simi Valley syndicate - estimated 20 burglaries

== Patterns ==
- Crime scenes
- Unarmed burglars
- Acquiring rental cars with false identities
- Using burner phones for communication between group members
- Targeting wealthy neighborhoods and homes, specifically empty homes
- Stealing watches, jewelry
- Frequently originating from Chile, sometimes Colombia
- Due to the high success rate of these criminal networks, high bail is often paid quickly by associates and the subjects skip court
