= Octavio Pisano =

American actor (born 1986)

- Born: May 25, 1986 (age 40); United States
- Occupations: Actor; director; producer
- Years active: 2012–present
- Spouse: Jessica Christine Maria Pisano
- Children: 1

Octavio Pisano is an American actor who portrayed Detective Joe Velasco, one of the core New York City Police Department (NYPD) detectives investigating sexually-based crimes, on Law & Order: Special Victims Unit.

== Early life ==
Pisano was born in the United States to an Italian family, the Pizanos, and was raised in Tijuana, Baja California, Mexico, so he feels himself to be part of all three cultures. He grew up speaking Italian and Spanish. When he was 17, his parents sent him to Canada to finish his studies and to learn English. He grew interested in acting and moved to Los Angeles.

== Career ==
Pisano's television debut came at the age of 27, in an episode of East Los High, a drama about a tough East Los Angeles inner-city high school. (Note: He was credited as Octavio Pizano, and the IMDb shows that spelling for all his appearances until 2020.) His big break came when, from 2014 to 2017, he starred as Julius Escada Jr. in the Oprah Winfrey Network prime-time soap opera If Loving You Is Wrong.

Perhaps because of his fluency in Spanish and his rugged looks, Pisano has found success in crime-drama Latino tough-guy roles. He worked as a bouncer in the Spanish-language Guatemala-based action film El Quetzal de Jade (2013); as Teo in the Dominican drug cartel movie Oro y Polvo (English: Powder and Gold; 2015); as greaser biker gang member Flaco in Badsville (which premiered at the New York Latino Film Festival in 2017); and took a top role in the Caribbean drug-cartel action film Narco Soldiers (2019). Pisano won the leading role of Hector Estrella in another Dominican drama, 2016's Love Kills (Piedra de Sangre), alongside Laura Harring and Bruce Davison; and appeared in the 2021 Paramount+ crime drama miniseries Coyote, a drama about the United States Border Patrol, playing the role of Sultan, a member of a family cartel. (Even in If Loving You Is Wrong, a soap opera created by Tyler Perry and set in the suburbs of Ohio, Pisano's character Julius was the son of the wealthy crime-lord head of a Medellín cartel, and he murdered his father for the money.)

Pisano took smaller roles in different and occasionally lighter fare films while he focused on television work. 2017's Smartass is a teen comedy; iLove (2019) is a six-part miniseries about the founders of a startup company built around catching cheaters. Go Crazy Go Mad (2018) is a micro-budget, rom-com-drama; the indie film Ms. Purple is a family drama set in Koreatown, Los Angeles. 2020's After the Reign is a mockumentary about the rise and fall of a social media prankster who transforms from a media sensation into a controversial hip-hop provocateur; and Feral State (2021) is a crime thriller in the gonzo "Florida Man" comedy mode. Meanwhile, Presence (2022) is an ambiguously supernatural-or-maybe-just-psychological horror film, in which Pisano's character might or might not have been killed early in the story.

=== Law & Order: Special Victims Unit ===
The character of Joe Velasco, an undercover cop with a backstory in Anapra, Ciudad Juárez, in Mexico, was introduced to Law & Order: Special Victims Unit (popularly known as SVU) in its 23rd season premiere ("And the Empire Strikes Back," September 23, 2021). Following three recurring character appearances, Pisano joined the main cast. In 2022 and 2023, he also appeared in three crossover episodes of the Law & Order: Organized Crime spin-off.

Pisano told an interviewer for Numéro Netherlands, "Honestly, when I started, Velasco was a mystery to me and to the audience. All I had was the script, a handful of lines, a little bit of a backstory and pure instinct. ... Mariska [Hargitay] and Ice-T really served as guides, on and off screen, giving me pointers and feedback I wasn't getting yet from the studio. I think at first, Velasco was learning the ropes. He came from undercover work and suddenly he's in SVU, a place that demands a level of emotional intelligence he didn't possess, a certain restraint which was foreign to him, as he relied mostly on impulse. You can see it in the first few episodes, his reactions are raw, as was my acting."

In "Post-Rage," the final episode of Season 26, Velasco is promoted to the rank of Detective Second Grade in the Manhattan NYPD.

In May 2025, it was announced that Pisano would not be returning to SVU as a series regular for the 27th season, with no explanation given. Because of the rumors, Hargitay, who plays Captain Olivia Benson, uploaded to Instagram on July 24 some behind-the-scenes footage. "First day back at SVU and we're about to rehearse, and I'm going to give you a little sneak peek," she whispers. "Guess who those people are?" She shows Pisano and Peter Scanavino (who plays ADA Carisi), rehearsing lines in the squad-room set for the season premiere. The following day, E! News and Deadline Hollywood based their reporting on her video that he would "return for the season opener."

== Later work ==
=== As filmmaker ===
In 2025, he said, "I'm developing two scripts that I wrote and a film that was offered to me. I'm excited because they're all very different characters and very unique stories. I also have a book I've been working on and that I'm really excited to announce."

Forming his own production company, Earthside Entertainment, with Gavin O'Connor and Joanna Naugle among the team, Pisano wrote, directed, and produced the 2023 short film El Campo, which premiered at the Cannes Film Festival in 2024 and won an Award of Excellence at the Santa Barbara Indie Film Festival. He told an interviewer in 2025 that he had completed a boxing drama with the painterly title Wet Under Blue Sky, again with writing, directing, and executive producing responsibilities, but this time starring himself.

== Personal life ==
Pisano is married to Jessica Christine Maria, and they have one daughter, Olivia, who was born in 2015. They live in New Jersey.

Pisano has always devoted his energies to writing poetry and painting. In 2014, he told AfterBuzz TV he considered himself an expressionist painter: "Whatever I was feeling in the moment was just coming out." He considered it a self-structured artform, whereas acting requires parameters such as scheduling and collaboration. A decade later, he saw how his different forms of expression could be interwoven. "Painting has helped me with crafting a shot, with the framing of it and the composition. Editing actors has helped me make better and more efficient choices as an actor. Directing is all about leadership, so it's given me many lessons for real life scenarios that I didn't have before leading a set," he said. "At one point I was working two jobs and making art on the weekends. Now, I am able to make a living from my art. As my career evolves, I want to continue working as an artist, and eventually incorporate my family more prominently in my business. As an actor, I feel like I'm barely getting started."

== Filmography ==
=== Film ===
Year	Title	Role	Notes
2012	Jacked	Avery Jack	Short film
2013	El Quetzal de Jade	Bouncer	
2015	Touched	Tommy	
2015	Oro y Polvo (English: Powder and Gold)	Teo	
2016	Love Kills	Hector Estrella	
2017	Badsville	Flaco	
2017	Smartass	Lobo	
2018	Go Crazy Go Mad	Rodrigo	
2019	Ms. Purple	Octavio	
2019	Our Home Here	Mateo	Short film
2019	Narco Soldiers	Teo	
2020	After the Reign	Oscar Gomez	
2020	Feral State	Cyrus	Also associate producer
2022	Presence	Keaton	
2023	El Campo (English: The Field)		Writer, director, and executive producer of this short film, which received acclaim. (Note: Numéro Netherlands wrote in an interview with Pisano, "His most recent short film, El Campo, which he also directed and produced, premiered at Cannes Film Festival in 2024 and won best short film at the Cannes Indie Short Awards, the Santa Barbara Indie Film Festival and New York Indie Shorts Festival.")
2024	Wet Under Blue Sky		Actor, screenwriter, director, and executive producer

=== Television ===
Year	Title	Role	Notes
2013	East Los High	Tony	Episode: "The Heart Always Knows"
2014–2017	If Loving You Is Wrong	Julius Escada Jr.	Series regular (Seasons 1–3)
2019	iLove	Scott	Recurring role in 4 episodes out of 6
2019	New York Undercover	Moses Hernandez	Unsold pilot for ABC reboot of the 1994–1999 original police drama. (Note: A Deadline Hollywood article explained, "... New York Undercover picks up 20 years after the end of the original Fox series that changed the face of TV cop dramas. It will follow detectives Nat Gilmore and Melissa Ortiz as they investigate the city's most dangerous criminals from Harlem to Battery Park. ... Pizano [i.e. Pisano] is Moses Hernandez, an eager beaver with a hero complex.")
2021	Coyote	Sultan	Series regular, 6 episodes
2021–2026	Law & Order: Special Victims Unit	Detective Joe Velasco	Series regular (Seasons 23–27); Guest star 2 episodes
2022–2023	Law & Order: Organized Crime	Detective Joe Velasco	3 crossover episodes
2026	CIA	John	Episode: "Inside Men"
