= Fazekas & Butters =

American television production company

- Type: Privately held company
- Industry: Television
- Founded: October 4, 2005; 21 years ago
- Founder: Michele Fazekas; Tara Butters
- Headquarters: Los Angeles, California, United States

Fazekas & Butters is a television production company founded on October 4, 2005, by Michele Fazekas and Tara Butters.

== History ==
The company was established on October 4, 2005, when Michele Fazekas and Tara Butters left the long-running television series Law & Order: Special Victims Unit to sign an overall deal with Touchstone Television. Their first production, Reaper, aired on The CW from 2007 to 2009.

In 2009, the duo moved to 20th Century Fox Television, but the partnership was terminated in 2011. A subsequent partnership with CBS Television Studios was also short-lived. Neither of these resulted in any published material.

In 2013, they signed a deal with ABC Studios, working first on Agent Carter (2015–2016), then creating Kevin (Probably) Saves the World (2017–2018) and Emergence (2019–2020).

In the 27th season of Law & Order: Special Victims Unit, Fazekas returned to the series as the showrunner. She is the first woman to hold this position in the series' history. Fazekas will again resume the role of showrunner for Law & Order: Special Victims Unit during the show's 28th season.

== Productions ==
Year(s)	Title	Creator(s)	Networks	Notes
2007–2009	Reaper	Michele Fazekas; Tara Butters	The CW	co-production with The Mark Gordon Company, Dark Baby Productions and ABC Studios
2015–2016	Agent Carter	Christopher Markus; Stephen McFeely	ABC	co-production with Marvel Television and ABC Studios
2017–2018	Kevin (Probably) Saves the World	Michele Fazekas; Tara Butters	ABC	co-production with ABC Studios
2019–2020	Emergence	Michele Fazekas; Tara Butters	ABC	co-production with ABC Studios
2023–2025	Gen V	Craig Rosenberg; Evan Goldberg; Eric Kripke	Amazon Prime Video	co-production with Point Grey Pictures, Kripke Enterprises, Original Film, Kickstart Entertainment, KFL Nightsky Productions, Amazon MGM Studios and Sony Pictures Television
