= Aimé Donna Kelly =

American actress

Aimé Donna Kelly is an American actress, known for her role as Captain Renee Curry on Law & Order: Special Victims Unit (2020–present). She has also appeared as a guest star on series including The Marvelous Mrs. Maisel, The Blacklist and Chicago Med.

== Life and career ==
Aimé studied at the University of The Arts and received her BFA in Acting and recently graduated from The New School with an MA in Arts Management and Entrepreneurship. Prior to joining the cast of Law & Order: Special Victims Unit as a series regular, she was an Assistant Professor of Theatre Arts at Marymount Manhattan College as well as an Adjunct Associate Professor at The University of The Arts.

== Filmography ==
Key
†	Denotes films that have not yet been released

Year	Title	Role	Notes
2017	Iron Fist	Nurse Stacy Hill	Episode: "Bar the Big Boss"
2017	The Marvelous Mrs. Maisel	Janet Shaw	2 episodes
2020	The Sinner	Marta Hines	Episode: "Part VII"
2020	Manifest	Uniformed Cop	Episode: "Icing Conditions"
2020	Blue Bloods	Angelique Loomis	Episode: "Hide in Plain Sight"
2020	Out of Order	Evelyn, the operator	Short film
2020	For Life	Yandi	Episode: "Time to Move Forward"
2020–present	Law & Order: Special Victims Unit	Captain Renee Curry	Main (season 27–present), Recurring (seasons 22–23, 25–26)
2021	Marvel's Wastelanders	Francine (voice)	7 episodes; podcast series
2021	Ghostwriter	Paloma	Film; voice role
2021	The Blacklist	Kamina Gilford	Episode: "Arcane Wireless"
2021–2022	Chicago Med	Molly Hodges	2 episodes
TBA	The Greatest †	Alberta Jones	3 episodes (filming)
