= Ryan Buggle =

American actor (born 2010)

- Born: January 31, 2010 (age 16); New Jersey, U.S.
- Occupations: Actor, dancer
- Years active: 2013–present

Ryan Buggle (born January 31, 2010) is an American actor and dancer from Matawan, New Jersey. He is best known for playing Noah Porter-Benson on Law & Order: Special Victims Unit.

== Early life ==
Buggle was born on January 31, 2010, in New Jersey. He began studying dance at the age of 5, and he continues to train and compete.

== Career ==
Buggle made his acting debut in 2013 in a Toys "R" Us commercial.

In 2017, Buggle joined the cast of Law & Order: Special Victims Unit, taking over the role of Noah Benson, the adopted son of Captain Olivia Benson. He has also appeared twice on spinoff series Law & Order: Organized Crime. Due to his love and talent for dance, Ryan petitioned the writers to incorporate this into the show.

In 2017, Buggle was featured as part of the cast of Radio City Music Hall Christmas Spectacular.

Buggle made his Broadway debut in 2019, as part of the cast of The Inheritance. He played the role until 2020, which the Broadway play shuttered due to the COVID-19 pandemic.

Buggle made two guest appearances in the Netflix series Mindhunter. In 2020, Ryan was featured in the film Lazy Susan, written by and starring Sean Hayes.

== Filmography ==
=== Film ===
Year	Title	Role	Notes
2018	Alterscape	Young Ray	
2019	The Reliant	Young Jimmy	
2020	Lazy Susan	Andy	
2022	The Falling World	Jack Jr.	

=== Television ===
Year	Title	Role	Notes
2016	Person of Interest	Sebastian Wilkins	1 episode
2016	Saturday Night Live		2 episodes
2017–present	Law & Order: Special Victims Unit	Noah Benson	42 episodes
2019	Mindhunter	Nick	2 episodes
2021	Law & Order: Organized Crime	Noah Benson	2 episodes
2026	Love in Storytown	Caleb Taylor	TV movie
2026	Nocturne	Kevin	1 episode
2026	The Good Daughter	Little Mike	1 episode

=== Stage ===
Year	Title	Role	Notes
2017	Radio City Music Hall Christmas Spectacular Starring The Radio City Rockettes		
2019–2020	The Inheritance	Boy	
