= Kelli Giddish =

American actress (born 1980)

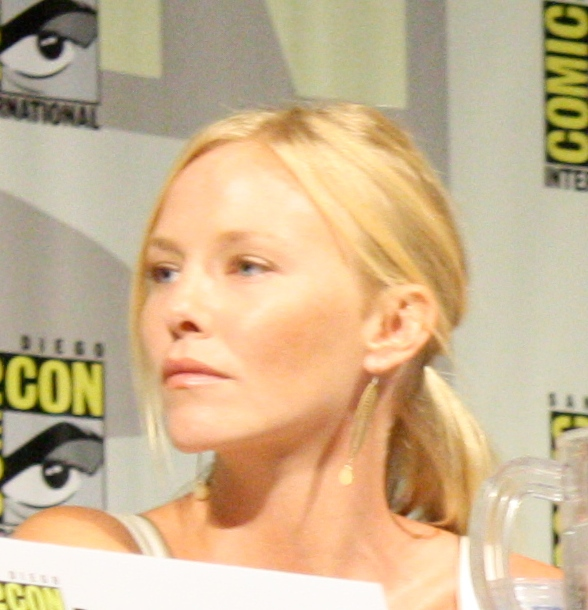
- Giddish at Comic Con 2009
- Born: April 13, 1980 (age 46); Cumming, Georgia, U.S.
- Education: University of Evansville
- Occupation: Actress
- Years active: 2005–present
- Spouses: Lawrence Faulborn (m. 2015; div. 2018) Beau Richards (m. 2021)
- Children: 3

Kelli Marie Giddish (born April 13, 1980) is an American television, stage, and film actress. She is best known as NYPD Detective/Sergeant Amanda Rollins in Law & Order: Special Victims Unit (2011–present). Giddish previously played Di Henry in All My Children (2005–2007), Dr. Kate McGinn in Past Life (2010), and Annie Nolan Frost in Chase (2010–2011).

== Early life, family and education ==
Giddish was born in Cumming, Georgia, the daughter of Charles and Nita Giddish; she has a brother, Eli. Her paternal grandfather encouraged her interest in acting, taking her to the Fox Theatre in Atlanta. Her maternal grandmother was also very supportive of her interests.

As a youth, Giddish performed at a community theater run by a local drama teacher, Yatesy Harvey, who was a friend of her mother. Giddish also participated in her sleepover drama camps. Of Harvey, Giddish has recalled, "She just inspired a fierce curiosity and very high standards of what acting was and how much dedication it took and rehearsal and we would do plays every night."

Giddish won a number of accolades as a teen. While attending Forsyth Central High School, she was a member of their championship softball team, and in 1998 she was the State Literary Champion for Girls Dramatic Interpretation.

She graduated from the University of Evansville in Indiana, where she majored in theater performance. The Giddish family was very supportive of her acting pursuits. Her parents drove to Indiana to see her perform in all of her productions.

== Career ==
After college, Giddish moved to New York City to pursue an acting career. Within a year, she landed a role in a Broadway play with Farrah Fawcett.

=== 2005–2010: Early career ===
Giddish portrayed Diana Henry on soap opera All My Children from 2005 to 2007. In July 2007, Soap Opera Weekly magazine confirmed that Giddish and All My Children parted ways in a mutual decision and that she would make her final appearance as Di on September 19, 2007.

She appeared in the thriller film Death in Love (2008), which premiered at the Sundance Film Festival. She played the role of Courtney in the web series The Burg, credited as the first scripted web series. The same people responsible for The Burg also created All's Faire, in which Giddish played the role of Cindy.

Giddish, Nicholas Bishop, and Ravi Patel were cast in Fox's reincarnation drama pilot Past Life. The Warner Bros.-produced project revolved around past-life investigators. Giddish played a Ph.D. in psychology and cognitive research who believes in reincarnation. On May 18, 2009, Fox announced that it had ordered Past Life to series, airing midseason 2010 at 9:00 PM EST on Tuesdays. It premiered on February 9, 2010, but was canceled on February 18.

Giddish starred as the central character, U.S. Marshal Annie Frost, in the police procedural drama Chase, which premiered on NBC in autumn 2010. Giddish received rave reviews for her performances, but the show was pulled in early February 2011. On April 6, 2011, NBC decided to broadcast five unaired episodes of Chase on Saturday nights, with the first beginning on April 23, 2011.

=== 2011–present: Law & Order: Special Victims Unit ===
In January 2007, Giddish guest starred on Law & Order: Special Victims Unit in the episode "Outsider" as rape victim Kara Bawson.

It was announced on June 27, 2011, that Giddish would join the cast of Law & Order: Special Victims Unit for its thirteenth season along with Cold Case's Danny Pino coinciding with Christopher Meloni's departure from the series. Giddish told TV Guide during summer filming, "They've lost a family member with Chris Meloni leaving, but they've been very accepting of us. Detective Amanda [Rollins, her character on the show] is thrilled to be here working with these people, and so am I."

Giddish made her debut as Rollins in the 13th-season premiere, "Scorched Earth", in which the character first works alongside Detective Olivia Benson (Mariska Hargitay). Giddish expressed confidence that viewers would warm up to Rollins and another new character, Nick Amaro (Pino), with time.

At the end of the series' Season 13, she said she and Pino received not only a "very warm welcome" from SVU's cast and crew, but saw their respective characters explored more than they could hope for in their first season. "They've given me a lot to work with — and I hope they give me more next season," says Giddish. "We're still playing 'musical chairs' in terms of partners, and that's a great way to go about exploring the different characters."

On April 16, 2020, Giddish's character was promoted to 2nd grade class detective, in "Solving for the Unknowns".

Giddish's initial departure as a regular cast member was season 24, episode 9 ("And a Trauma in a Pear Tree") in which Rollins married ADA Dominick Carisi Jr. (Peter Scanavino) and resigned from the Special Victims Unit to accept an offer to teach at Fordham University. She returned as a special guest star in season 24, episode 22 ("All Pain Is One Malady"), season 25, episode 1 ("Tunnel Blind") and episode 11 ("Prima Nocta"), season 26, episode 3 ("Divide and Conquer"), episode 8 ("Cornered"), episode 9 ("First Light"), episode 16, ("Accomplice Liability") and episode 20 ("Shock Collar"). After her last episode as a regular on SVU in 2022, she also appeared in the third season of the spin-off Law & Order: Organized Crime assisting Elliot Stabler on a case in episodes 21 ("Shadowerk") and 22 ("With Many Names"), the latter of which aired as a crossover event with the 24th season of SVU.

Starting September 2025, Giddish returned as a series regular for the 27th season, after the show received harsh criticism from cast members, and the audience for letting her go.

== Other works ==
In 2011, Giddish appeared in the music video for "Nadine" by Project Jenny, Project Jan.

In May 2018, Giddish appeared in the music video for “All Love Is Lost” by Body Count, Giddish's SVU co-star Ice-T's band, from their 2017 album Bloodlust with Max Cavalera from Soulfly and Cavalera Conspiracy as a special guest.

== Personal life ==
Giddish married Lawrence Faulborn on June 20, 2015, in New Smyrna Beach, Florida. She gave birth to the couple's first child, son Ludo, in October 2015, and second child, son Charlie, in November 2018. Giddish and Faulborn divorced in 2018.

On November 7, 2021, Giddish eloped with Beau Richards, whom she met on the SVU set while he worked as her driver. In June 2023, she gave birth to her third son, the couple's first, Oldie. All of her pregnancies were written into Law & Order: Special Victims Unit.

== Filmography ==
=== Film ===
Year	Title	Role	Notes
2005	Witches of the Caribbean	Clara	
2006	Walls	Sara	Short film
2008	Death in Love	Young Mother	
2008	The Understudy	Simone	
2012	Breathless	Tiny	

=== Television ===
Year	Title	Role	Notes
2004–2007	All My Children	Elise Baylor	Recurring
2004–2007	All My Children	Diana "Di" Henry	Series regular
2006–2009	The Burg	Courtney	Web-series, 13 episodes
2007	Damages	Heather MacDonald	2 episodes
2007	Law & Order: Criminal Intent	Dana Stipe	Episode: "Depths"
2007, 2011–present	Law & Order: Special Victims Unit	Kara Bawson	Episode: "Outsider"
2007, 2011–present	Law & Order: Special Victims Unit	Sgt. Amanda Rollins	Series regular (seasons 13–24, 27); Guest star (seasons 25–26)
2008	All's Faire	Cindy	Web series
2008	Without a Trace	Ariana Murphy	Episode: "Rise and Fall"
2009	Life on Mars	Carol	Episode: "Coffee, Tea or Annie"
2010	Past Life	Dr. Kate McGinn	Series regular, 9 episodes
2010–2011	Chase	Annie Frost	Series regular, 18 episodes
2011, 2014	The Good Wife	Sophia Russo	4 episodes
2014	Chicago Fire	Det. Amanda Rollins	Episode: "Nobody Touches Anything"
2014–2015	Chicago P.D.	Det. Amanda Rollins	3 episodes
2022	Law & Order	Det. Amanda Rollins	Episode: "Gimme Shelter – Part Three"
2022–2023	Law & Order: Organized Crime	Det. Amanda Rollins	3 episodes
