= United States law enforcement decorations =

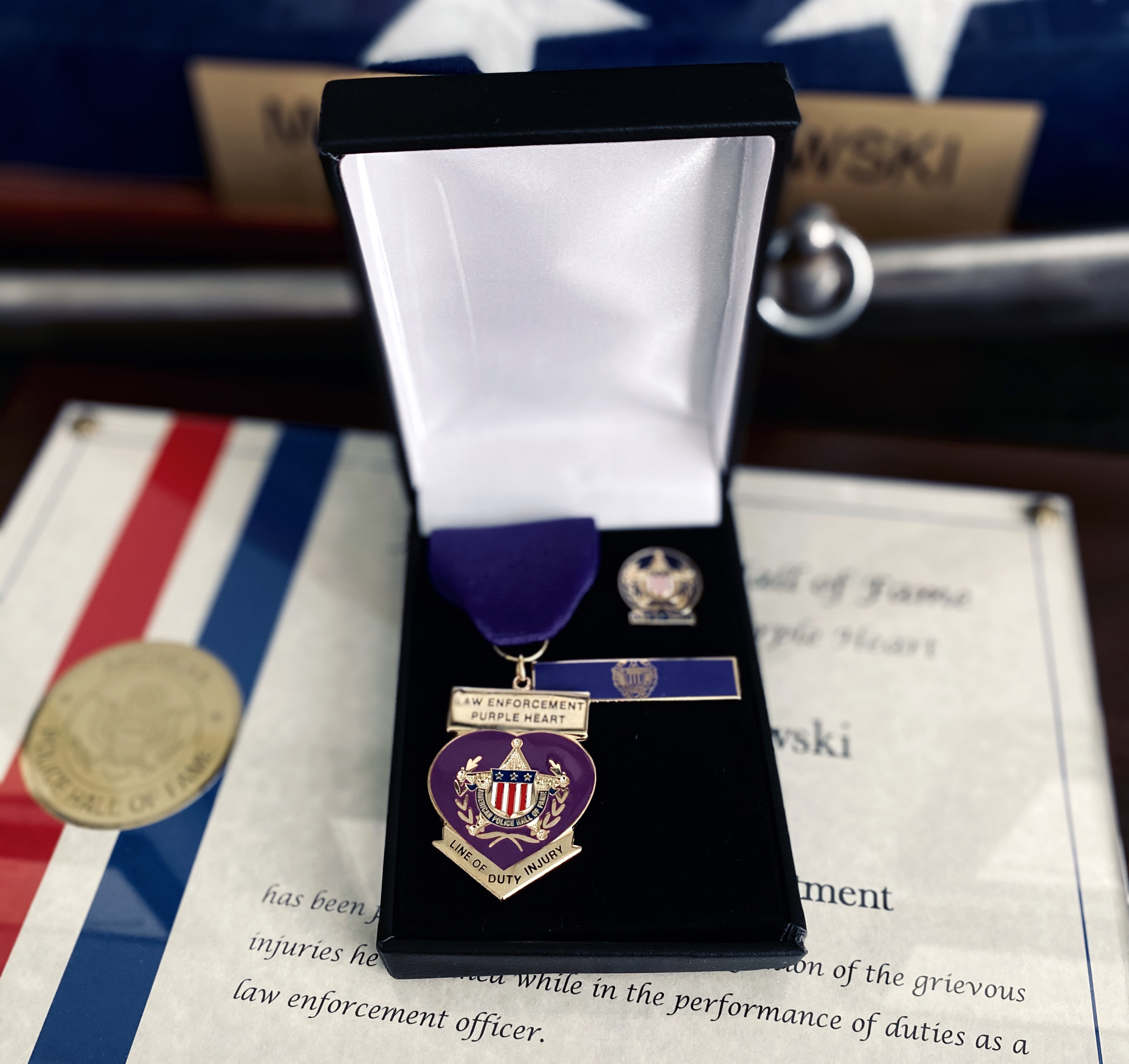
A Law Enforcement Purple Heart and Certificate issued by the National Association of Chiefs of Police.

United States law enforcement decorations are awarded by the police forces of the United States of America. Since the United States has a decentralized police force, with separate independent departments existing on the state and local level, there are thousands of law enforcement decorations in existence.

== Usage and history ==
Law enforcement medals and badges first appeared in the late 19th century, as used by some of the (then) largest police departments in the country, such as the New York City Police Department and Chicago Police Department. Early law enforcement awards were often pins and badges awarded on a case-by-case basis. Standardized law enforcement awards began to appear once police departments began issuing more codified and structured uniform regulations.

Originally, law enforcement awards were rarely awarded, and then only for acts of heroism or bravery. The oldest police awards thus have such names as "Medal of Valor" and "Medal of Honor". Later in the 20th century, police departments began issuing medal ribbons for such routine tasks as years of service, completion of training, or simply general membership in the police. Law enforcement awards, historically the domain of larger city departments, became more common with smaller local and town offices, as well as Sheriff's departments, towards the end of the 20th century.

Typically, law enforcement decorations are bestowed by a particular police department and may only be worn and displayed while a police officer is serving as a member of that particular law enforcement activity. Most such awards are provided by city, county and state officials. Federal law enforcement agencies, such as the FBI, DEA, and the Department of Homeland Security issue medals under the authority of the United States government which are considered separate civilian government awards.

Law enforcement awards are often independently designed by the city, town, or county, where they are issued and many have a unique appearance to separate them from U.S. military awards (which are themselves often authorized for wear on police uniforms by military veterans). During the trial of George Zimmerman, the Sanford Police Department came under heavy criticism when it was revealed on national television that their officers were wearing U.S. military awards, including such decorations as the Defense Distinguished Service Medal, with simply different names as police awards. After numerous complaints to both the Sanford police and the Fraternal Order of Police, the department discontinued this practice of wearing U.S. military awards in lieu of unique police decorations.

== Index of law enforcement awards ==
The following sections list various police decorations by awarding agency

=== Columbia Police Department ===
- Medal of Valor
- Purple Heart
- Certificate of Commendation
- Letter of Appreciation

=== Denver Police Department ===
- Denver Police Medal of Honor
- Denver Police Service Cross
- Denver Police Medal of Valor
- Police Purple Heart
- Police Lifesaving Medal
- Police Campaign Medal
- Physical Fitness Award

=== Elyria Police Department ===
- Elyria Police Medal of Honor
- Elyria Police Medal of Valor
- Police Lifesaving Medal
- Police Medal of Merit
- Police Purple Heart
- Police Commendation Medal
- Safe Driving Medal
- Tactical Squad Service Medal
- Community Service Medal
- Police Education Medal
- Advanced Certification Medal
- Field Training Officer Medal
- Top Gun Medal
- Police Honor Guard Medal

=== Indianapolis Metropolitan Police Department ===
- Medal of Honor
- Purple Heart
- Medal of Valor
- Medal of Bravery
- Medal of Merit
- Ruthann Popcheff Memorial Award

=== Los Angeles Police Department ===
- Los Angeles Police Medal of Valor
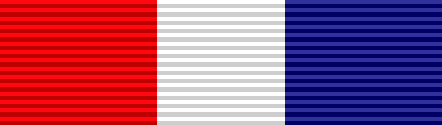
- Liberty Award
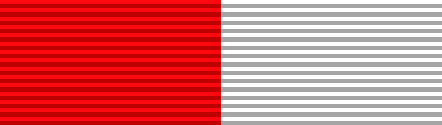
- Police Medal for Heroism
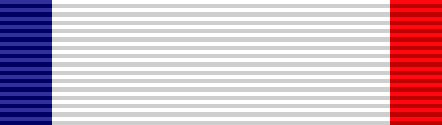
- Los Angeles Police Star
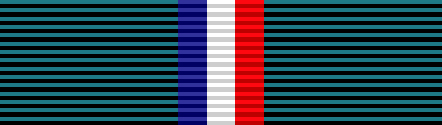
- Police Lifesaving Medal
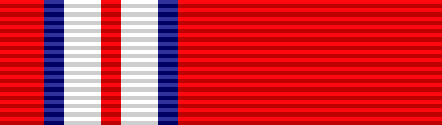
- Police Commission Distinguished Service Medal
- Police Distinguished Service Medal
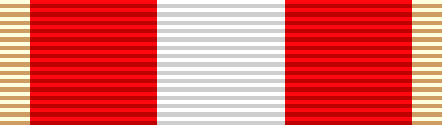
- Police Meritorious Service Medal
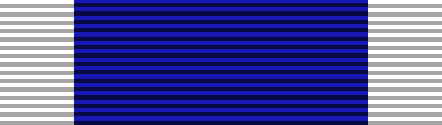
- Police Meritorious Achievement Medal
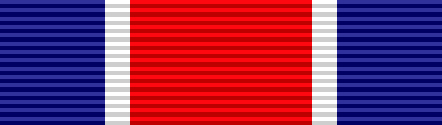
- Community Policing Medal
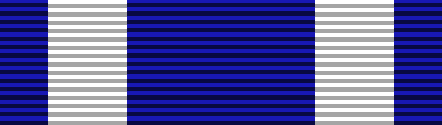
- Human Relations Medal
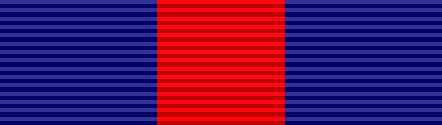
- Police Commission Unit Citation
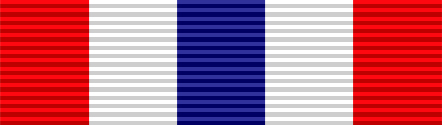
- Police Meritorious Unit Citation
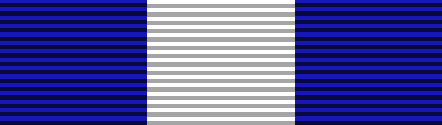
- Reserve Police Officer Service Ribbon
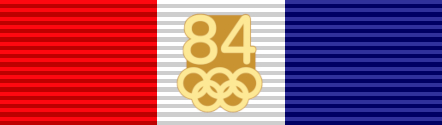
- 1984 Summer Olympics Ribbon
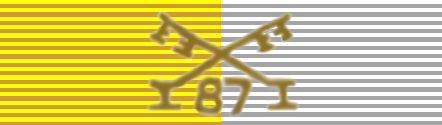
- 1987 Papal Visit Ribbon
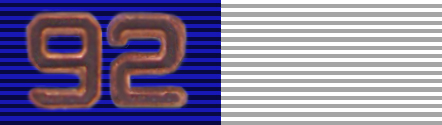
- 1992 Civil Disturbance Ribbon
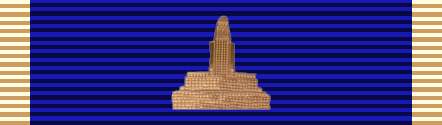
- 1994 Northridge earthquake Ribbon
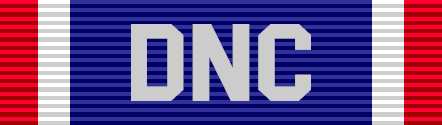
- 2000 Democratic National Convention Ribbon
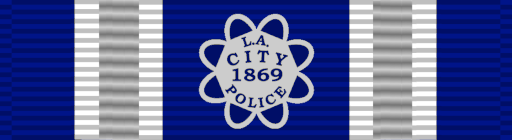
- 2019 LAPD 150th Anniversary Ribbon

=== Minneapolis Police Department ===
- Medal of Honor
- Medal of Valor
- Department Purple Heart Medal
- Medal of Commendation
- Excellence in Tactics and De-Escalation Award
- Department Award of Merit
- Life Saving Award
- Unit Citation Award
- Chief's Award of Merit
- Outstanding Employee Pin
- Distinguished Service Award
- Excellence in Investigation Award
- 2020 Distinguished Service Ribbon

=== Minnesota State Patrol ===
Award	Criterion
Valor Award	The Valor Award is for an outstanding degree of dedication and devotion above and beyond professional duty that involved an imminent and undisputable risk of loss of life to the employee. This award is given for an act or series of acts committed with outstanding courage in a situation that, because of its extraordinary circumstance, placed the employee and/or others in actual physical jeopardy. While exposed to danger, the person must have acted with deliberate intent, exercised judgment and performed competent action that reflects credit and admiration upon the employee and the Minnesota State Patrol. This award may be presented posthumously to the next-of-kin of the employee/enforcement officer who would have received the award.
Purple Heart	This recognition may be awarded to employees seriously injured or killed from acts of aggression or assaults upon them while performing job-related duties. The person's injuries must involve a substantial risk of death, permanent disfigurement or protracted loss or impairment of their body's ability to function. This award may be presented posthumously to the next-of-kin of the employee who would have otherwise received the award.
Trooper of the Year	This award is presented to the trooper who best demonstrates outstanding work performance, initiative, leadership and effective interpersonal relations.
Civilian Employee of the Year	This award is presented to the non-sworn employee who best demonstrates outstanding work performance, initiative, leadership and effective interpersonal relations.
Leadership Award	This award is presented yearly to the employee who consistently exhibits outstanding leadership and excellence in public safety through their personal actions, guidance, direction and professional involvement.
Eagle Squadron Award	Each year, the Eagle Squadron Award is presented to the Minnesota State Patrol trooper who arrested the greatest number of impaired drivers the previous year.
Exceptional Service Award	This award is presented to employees who have provided extraordinary service in the performance of their duties.
Meritorious Service Award	This award is presented to employees for acts involving personal risk-posing hazards that could lead to serious injury or loss of life to the employee.
Chief's Commendation Award – Communications/911	This award is presented to radio communications operators who provide vital, life-saving services that lead to the rescue of a person, provide outstanding performance during a special event, or provide a consistent, sustained, high level of customer service.
Life Saving Award	This award is presented to members of the State Patrol who distinguish themselves by performing acts that prevent the death of another.
Minnesota State Patrol Commendation Award	This award is presented to members of another law enforcement or emergency service agency who have assisted the State Patrol in providing a significant service.
Meritorious Citizenship Award	This award is presented to individuals other than State Patrol employees who helped the State Patrol in providing a significant service to the public.

=== Montgomery County Police Department ===
Award	Ribbon	Criterion
Medal of Valor		The MCPD's highest award, the Medal of Valor is awarded to an MCPD officer for heroism and distinction in extremely hazardous circumstances. To be considered for this honor, an employee must exhibit unusual bravery in the performance of duty while facing the threat of death or serious injury.
Life Saving Award		The Life Saving Award is given to an MCPD officer who makes a major contribution toward saving the life of another by providing essential medical treatment prior to arrival of Emergency Medical Services (EMS) personnel.
Commendation		A Commendation is awarded to an MCPD officer who makes a significant contribution to the mission of the department beyond the ordinary call of duty. It recognizes those incidents wherein the member's courage, resourcefulness, tenacity, and/or perseverance in the performance of the employee's duties has resulted in the protection of life or property, the prevention of a major crime, or the apprehension of an armed and dangerous criminal.

=== New York City Police Department ===
- NYPD Medal of Honor
- NYPD Combat Cross
- NYPD Medal of Valor
- NYPD Purple Shield
- Meritorious Police Duty (MPD) Honorable Mention
- Meritorious Police Duty (MPD) Exceptional Merit
- Meritorious Police Duty (MPD) Commendation or Commendation – Integrity
- Meritorious Police Duty (MPD) Commendation – Community Service
- Meritorious Police Duty (MPD)
- Excellent Police Duty (EPD)

=== Oklahoma City Police Department ===
- Oklahoma Police Medal of Honor
- Oklahoma Police Cross
- Police Medal of Valor
- Medal of Meritorious Service

=== Philadelphia Police Department ===
- Sgt. Robert F. Wilson III Commendation for Valor
- Commendation for Bravery
- Commendation for Heroism
- Commendation for Merit
- Commendatory Citation
- RNC Service Ribbon
- Military Service Ribbon

=== Saint Louis Metropolitan Police Department ===
- Saint Louis Meritorious Award
- Saint Louis Medal of Valor – Crusade Against Crime
- Saint Louis Chief of Police Letter of Accommodation
- Saint Louis Captains Letter of Accommodation
- Saint Louis Officer of the Year Award
- Saint Louis Officer of the Month Award (Given each month in each of the Six Districts)
- Proclamation by the Mayor of the City of Saint Louis
- Proclamation by the City of Saint Louis Board of Aldermen

=== Sanford Police Department ===
Prior to the controversy surrounding the display of obvious U.S. military award ribbons as police decorations, the Sanford police issued these ribbons (in order of precedence shown below) before discontinuing the practice.

=== St. Louis County Police Department ===
- St. Louis County Medal of Honor
- Police Medal of Valor
- St. Louis Distinguished Service Citation
- St. Louis Meritorious Service Citation
- Police Purple Heart
- Citizen's Recognition Medal

=== Texas' State Awards ===
- Star of Texas (Award) Star of Texas Award

== See also ==
- Police ranks of the United States
- Washington Law Enforcement Medal of Honor
