= Lilly (surname) =

Lilly is a surname. Notable people with the surname include:

- Armistead Abraham Lilly (1878–1956), American lawyer, politician, and businessperson
- Bob Lilly (born 1939), American football player and photographer
- David Lilly (born 1986), Scottish footballer and head coach
- Doris Lilly (1922-1991), writer ("How to Marry a Millionaire," "How to Make Love in Five Languages", etc.)
- Edward P. Lilly (1910–1994), American historian, founder of the CIA Psychological Bureau Services
- Eli Lilly (disambiguation), several people
- Evangeline Lilly (born 1979), Canadian actress
- George Lilly (1770s–1846), Canadian lawyer, official, and judge
- Gweneth Lilly (1920–2004), Welsh writer and teacher
- Jim Lilly (born 1981), American politician
- John Lilly, several people
- Joseph Lilly (1893–1952), American Vincentian priest and Scripture scholar
- Josiah K. Lilly Jr. (1893–1966), American industrialist
- Josiah K. Lilly Sr. (1861–1948), American industrialist
- Ken Lilly (born 1959), Australian cricketer
- Kenneth Norman Lilly (1929–1996), British artist
- Kevin Lilly (born 1963), American football player
- Kristine Lilly (born 1971), American soccer player
- Mary Lilly (1859–1930), American politician and social activist
- Mike Lilly (comics), American comic book artist
- Mike Lilly (musician) (1950–2020), American banjoist and singer
- Paul Douglas Lilly (born 1969), American judge
- Samuel Lilly (1815–1880), American politician from New Jersey
- Ted Lilly (born 1976), American former baseball pitcher
- The Lilly Brothers, American bluegrass musicians
- Thomas Jefferson Lilly (1878–1956), American politician
- William Lilly (disambiguation), several people
