= Zilly =

Zilly is a surname. Notable people with the surname include:

- Franz Zilly, German figure skater
- Jack Zilly (1921–2009), American football player
- Thomas Samuel Zilly (born 1935), American judge

== Fictional characters ==
- Wolf-Rüdiger Zilly is main character from Dastardly and Muttley in Their Flying Machines. Voiced by Don Messick.

== See also ==
- Lilly (surname)
- Zilli (disambiguation)
