= List of killings by law enforcement officers in the United States, February 2022 =

This is a list of people reported killed by non-military law enforcement officers in the United States in February 2022, whether in the line of duty or not, and regardless of reason or method. The listing documents the occurrence of a death, making no implications regarding wrongdoing or justification on the part of the person killed or officer involved. Killings are arranged by date of the incident that caused death. Different death dates, if known, are noted in the description. The table below lists 88 people.

== February 2022 ==
Date	Name (age) of deceased	Race	City/state	Description
2022-02-28	Kourtney Sherwood (37)	White	Topsham, ME	
2022-02-28	Unnamed person	Unknown race	Wellington, NV	
2022-02-27	John Charles Moreida (34)	Hispanic	Shelley, ID	
2022-02-27	Marcelo Alfredo Suarez (24)	Hispanic	Houston, TX	
2022-02-26	Derek Stortzum (29)	White	Norton, KS	
2022-02-26	Jacob Huerta (37)	Hispanic	Rosenberg, TX	
2022-02-26	David Cottes Jr (69)	Hispanic	Hollywood, FL	
2022-02-25	Unknown	Unknown	Detroit, Michigan	Police shot a man suspected of armed home invasion while he fled from a vehicle with a firearm after crashed into a taxi, with the accident killing a passenger.
2022-02-25	Gregory Lasselle (27)	White	Pittsfield, ME	
2022-02-25	Raphael Marquez (31)	Hispanic	Belen, NM	
2022-02-25	Brian Dangerfield (65)	White	Bealoton, VA	
2022-02-25	Mary Dangerfield (65)	White	Bealoton, VA	
2022-02-24	Andrew Castellano (34)	Hispanic	Edgewood, NM	
2022-02-24	Steven Wohlwend (31)	Unknown	Tacoma, Washington	Police responded to reports of a person with a gun in a Marriott Hotel. Upon arrival, police reportedly determined they had probable cause to arrest Wohlwend for armed robbery. Police eventually found Wohlwend and claimed he refused to show officers his hands. Police then shot and killed him. A gun was recovered from the scene.
2022-02-23	Jacori Shaw (23)	Black	Reno, NV	
2022-02-23	Daniel Ramirez (27)	Hispanic	Hobbs, NM	
2022-02-23	Steven Lewis Finfrock (63)	White	Macon, GA	
2022-02-23	Keleen RaShad Connell (27)	Black	Birmingham, AL	
2022-02-23	Joey Gilbert Gauthreaux (55)	White	Crowley, LA	
2022-02-23	Czyz Harrison (35)	Black	Houston, TX	
2022-02-22	Matthew Allen Deese (32)	White	Perry, GA	
2022-02-22	Tracy Gaeta (54)	Black	Stockton, California	A canine officer pursued Gaeta after she was suspected of hitting a police vehicle at a red light. When the pursuit ended at a dead-end Gaeta drove backwards into the officer's vehicle, and the officer fired eighteen times. When Gaeta pulled forward and reversed away from the officer, the officer fired more than a dozen times.
2022-02-22	Robert Lee Pilkey (28)	White	Maryville, TN	
2022-02-22	Lawrence LeJames Rodgers (21)	Black	Akron, OH	
2022-02-22	Richard Ward (32)	White	Pueblo West, Colorado	Police were called to a middle school where Ward and his mother were picking his younger brother up after Ward was reported trying to enter a vehicle, which he mistook as his own. When questioned by a deputy, Ward said that he might have had a pocketknife in his pocket. After Ward took a pill for anxiety, a struggle broke out between him and a deputy, who police say believed Ward was reaching for a weapon. The two struggled, the deputy yelled "gun," and the deputy shot Ward three times. Ward was not armed.
2022-02-21	David Liles (54)	White	Rogers, AR	
2022-02-19	Joel Arevalo (30)	Hispanic	Portland, Oregon	
2022-02-19	Donnell Rochester (18)	Black	Baltimore, Maryland	Rochester was wanted on a warrant for carjacking. When police tried to stop his vehicle he fled, and was later found parked. Police approached and Rochester ran from his vehicle, and then returned and tried to drive away as police surrounded his vehicle and ordered him out. Rochester was shot dead when he accelerated forwards. Police stated on a search and seizure warrant that Rochester struck an officer with his car, but bodycam footage showed the officer in question tell another officer he didn't think the vehicle hit him.
2022-02-19	Daniel Knight (39)	Unknown	Winter Park, Florida	Police responded to reports of an assault at a wedding and encountered Knight, the bride's uncle. Knight, who police say was not armed, got into a fight with a responding officer before a second officer shot him.
2022-02-19	Mizael Corrales (31)	Hispanic	San Diego, California	Deputies responded to a stolen SUV at a strip mall. Police say Corrales attempted to drive away and hit two deputies, and another deputy shot and killed him.
2022-02-17	Michael Freigang (47)	White	Dothan, AL	
2022-02-17	Cody Brandon Chavez (33)	Hispanic	Pleasanton, CA	
2022-02-17	John Michael Humphries (45)	White	Odessa, TX	
2022-02-17	Ringo Van Winkle (32)	White	Mesa, AZ	
2022-02-17	Zachary Tyler Alvarenga (25)	Hispanic	South Jordan, UT	
2022-02-17	Oscar Alcantara (30)	Hispanic	Bever Dam, AZ	
2022-02-17	Pedro Morales Lopez (67)	Hispanic	Norwalk, CA	
2022-02-16	Daniel Vallee (34)	Unknown	Marrero, Louisiana	Two sheriff's deputies responded to a noise complaint at a known crack house and encountered Vallee, a homeless man, sleeping in an SUV. After 12 minutes police say deputies shot Vallee after he honked the horn of the SUV. Vallee was unarmed at the time. The two deputies involved were later fired and charged with manslaughter.
2022-02-15	Stephanie Lorraine Browne (40)	White	Lancaster, CA	
2022-02-14	Ronald Gene Ingram (60)	White	Miami-Dade County, Florida	Several correctional officers beat Ingram, serving a life-sentence for murder, in a cell before he was transferred to another correctional institution. When the transport van stopped in Ocala, Ingram was found dead. Four of the officers involved were later charged with murder.
2022-02-14	Travis Boawn (37)	White	Edgewood, NM	
2022-02-14	Alexander Kade Lanier (26)	White	Oxford, AL	
2022-02-14	Lazaro Vargas-Yera (70)	Hispanic	Miami, FL	
2022-02-13	Andrew Stratton (34)	White	Alvo, NE	
2022-02-13	Brandon Combs (29)	White	Concord, North Carolina	An officer shot Combs after he got into the officer's patrol vehicle. Police initially stated the officer shot Combs after a physical altercation, but body camera footage showed the officer shot Combs after he got into the vehicle, which was not moving. Combs was unarmed during the shooting.
2022-02-13	Terry Edwin Moser (42)	Unknown race	Madisonville, TN	
2022-02-13	Blain Johnson (37)	White	Columbia, MO	
2022-02-13	Name Withheld	Unknown race	Salyersville, KY	
2022-02-12	Brendan Reilly (35)	White	Lexington, MA	
2022-02-12	James Huber (38)	White	Buffalo, New York	A state trooper shot and killed Huber after an earlier police chase. Bodycam footage shows the trooper shoot Huber moments after he drives his car in reverse. The car then flipped over the side of a nearby ramp.
2022-02-12	Ahmed Taqi (27)	Unknown	Dearborn, Michigan	Taqi, who may have been experiencing a mental health crisis, was shot after allegedly lighting a mosque on fire and shooting at responding officers.
2022-02-11	Luis Enrique Parra-Ramirez (31)	Hispanic	Aurora, CO	
2022-02-11	Dustin Booth (35)	White	Monroe, OH	
2022-02-11	Joseph Sanchez (36)	Unknown race	Puyallup, WA	
2022-02-10	Terrell Russell (22)	Black	New Orleans, LA	
2022-02-10	Hunter Tice (23)	White	Lake Forest, CA	
2022-02-10	Aian Thomas Tracy (32)	Native American	Ellis Township, Michigan	When Michigan State Police responded to a domestic violence call, Tracy attacked police with a hatchet, injuring an officer, and was shot by police.
2022-02-09	Makari Smith (23)	Black	Stovall, NC	
2022-02-09	Deven Karl Moore (25)	White	Oildale, CA	
2022-02-09	Jose De Jesus Montoya Villa (31)	Hispanic	Centennial, Colorado	Montoya Villa was suspected in a shooting at an Aurora church that killed his ex-girlfriend. Police say that as they were searching for Montoya Villa, he shot a man in a parking lot, carjacked two vehicles, got into a hit-and-run, robbed a liquor store and led police on a chase before being shot by police.
2022-02-09	Randy Lansang (36)	Asian	Daytona Beach, FL	
2022-02-09	Jayden Prunty (22)	Black	Jonesboro, AR	
2022-02-09	Richard Malone (41)	Black	Lake Charles, LA	
2022-02-08	Brian W. Schneider (36)	White	Mesa, AZ	
2022-02-08	Steve Neff (50)	White	Corpus Christi, TX	
2022-02-08	Daniel Joseph Spisso Jr (55)	White	Roan Mountain, TN	
2022-02-08	Unnamed person (38)	Unknown race	Mabank, TX	
2022-02-07	Troy Eames (21)	White	Clay, NY	
2022-02-07	Emilio Chamizo (30)	Hispanic	Phoenix, AZ	
2022-02-07	Richard Meyers (40)	White	Salem, OR	
2022-02-07	Shawn W. Wilson (36)	Black	Kansas City, MO	
2022-02-07	James David Fanning (49)	White	Greenville, TX	
2022-02-07	Anthony Parker (48)	White	Tucson, AZ	
2022-02-07	Charion Lockett (27)	Black	Houston, TX	
2022-02-06	Robert Junior Langley (46)	Black	Georgetown County, South Carolina	A Hemingway officer attempted to pull over Langley after he allegedly ran a stop sign. According to police, after Langley crashed into a ditch he attempted to exit his vehicle when the officer shot him in the chest. The officer was later charged with voluntary manslaughter. Police say the officer did not have authority to arrest Langley outside Williamsburg County, where Hemingway is located.
2022-02-06	Jason D. Ickler (38)	White	Topeka, KS	
2022-02-06	Unnamed person	Unknown race	Stanton, KY	
2022-02-06	Troy Allen Bain (58)	White	Willis, VA	
2022-02-04	Phillip Dill (34)	White	Evansville, IN	
2022-02-05	Michael Shane Carver (38)	White	Lincolnton, NC	
2022-02-04	Andrew John Jr. (34)	Native American	Aniak, AK	
2022-02-04	Isaiah Perez (16)	Hispanic	Tulsa, Oklahoma	Shortly before midnight police officers confronted a masked individual suspected of armed robbery. When the individual reached for a firearm at his waistband he was fatally shot. The individual was later identified to be 16-year-old Isaiah Perez.
2022-02-04	Nicholas Rodin (35)	White	Prineville, OR	
2022-02-02	Amir Locke (22)	Black	Minneapolis, Minnesota	An officer with the Minneapolis Police Department fatally shot Locke during a search warrant at an apartment in downtown Minneapolis. Bodycam footage shows Locke was sleeping on a couch until an officer woke him up, upon which Locke rose wrapped in blankets and holding a gun. Locke was not the target of the warrant.
2022-02-01	Devin Morris (31)	Hispanic	Albuquerque, New Mexico	Police responding to reports of a stolen vehicle pursued Morris to a hotel. Police say Morris had a gun and was shot after police tried to use a taser.
2022-02-01	Dustin Davidson (29)	White	Wichita Falls, TX	
2022-02-01	Isaiah Payne (31)	Black	Orlando, FL	
2022-02-01	Jonathan Murillo-Nix (23)	Hispanic	Los Angeles, CA	

== See also ==
- Death in custody § United States
- Henry A. Wallace Police Crime Public Database
- List of cases of police brutality
- List of countries with annual rates and counts for killings by law enforcement officers
- List of law enforcement officers killed in the line of duty in the United States
- List of law enforcement officers convicted for an on-duty killing in the United States
- List of shootings by US immigration agents
- List of police reforms related to the George Floyd protests
- List of unarmed African Americans killed by law enforcement officers in the United States
- Lists of killings by law enforcement officers
- Police brutality in the United States
- Police misconduct § United States
- Police riot § United States
- Police use of deadly force in the United States
