= New York City Police Department Medal of Honor =

Highest ranking award of the New York City Police Department

- Breast Bar of the Medal of Honor
- Type: Medal
- Country: United States
- Presented by: New York City Police Commissioner
- First award: 1912; 114 years ago

Precedence
- Next (lower): New York City Police Department Combat Cross

The New York City Police Department Medal of Honor is the highest law enforcement medal of the New York City Police Department. The Medal of Honor is awarded for individual acts of extraordinary bravery performed in the line of duty at extreme risk and danger to life.

The present NYPD Medal of Honor was created on October 23, 1973, with the medal of honor having existed in some form as far back as 1871, when the Medal of Honor was known by a variety of names such as the "Police Silver Medal" and "Gold Medal of Valor". These medals were either silver or gold medals, and could be awarded at the discretion of the police commissioners, in the shape of the then departmental shield. The "Police Silver Medal" and "Gold Medal of Valor" was first awarded on August 17, 1871 to Patrolman Bernard Tull of the 19th Precinct who arrested a burglar after being shot at. It was last awarded on January 21, 1884. The modern day New York City Police Department Medal of Honor was created in 1912 and was awarded until 1972, when it was redesigned.

On the obverse are the arms of the City of New York, the names of the police commissioners, and the words "Municipal Police". On the reverse is an inscription describing the act for which the medal was awarded. Later that medal was changed to a silver medal in the shape of a police shield. On the obverse is the figure of a draped female placing a wreath upon the head of a police officer. On the reverse is an inscription of the act of bravery and the names of the city's commissioners. The medal hangs from a ring and suspender on which the letters "NY" are interlocked (the current logo of the New York Yankees is based on this element of the Tiffany-designed medal) and attached to a top bar that is inscribed with the word "valor". The stars on the green ribbon suspender commemorate the city's original 12 police constables, who began to patrol in the 1700s.

The New York City Police Department also maintains a wide variety of other police medals, including the NYPD Combat Cross, which is awarded for life-threatening armed engagements with criminals and the Medal of Valor, which is presented for acts of bravery above the call of duty.

== History ==
Early versions of the decoration date as far back as 1871, when the Medal of Honor was known by a variety of names such as the "Police Silver Medal" and "Gold Medal of Valor".That medal was a silver or gold medal, either of which could be awarded at the discretion of the police commissioners, in the shape of the then shield of the department. On the obverse were the arms of the City of New York, the names of the police commissioners, and the words "Municipal Police". On the reverse was an inscription describing the act for which the medal was awarded. Later that medal was changed to a silver medal in the shape of a police shield.The "Police Silver Medal" and "Gold Medal of Valor" was first awarded on August 17, 1871 to Patrolman Bernard Tull of the 19th Precinct who arrested a burglar after being shot at. It was last awarded on January 21, 1884.

The New York City Police Department Medal of Honor was created in 1912 and was awarded until 1972, when it was redesigned.

== Notable recipients ==
- John Cordes, the first detective to be awarded the Medal twice (1923 and 1927)
- Frank Serpico (awarded in 1972)
- Moira Smith (2001), lone female NYPD officer killed in the September 11 attacks

== See also ==
- Medals of the New York City Police Department
- New York City Police Department Medal for Valor
- New York City Police Department Combat Cross
