= Colorado school shooting =

Colorado school shooting may refer to:

- Columbine High School massacre, Columbine, Colorado, April 20, 1999
- Platte Canyon High School hostage crisis, Bailey, Colorado, September 27, 2006
- STEM School Highlands Ranch shooting, Highlands Ranch, Colorado, May 7, 2019
- Killing of Richard Ward, Liberty Point International Middle School, Pueblo West, Colorado, February 22, 2022

== See also ==
- List of mass shootings in the United States
