= Paul Douglas Lilly =

American judge

His Honor Paul Douglas Lilly
- In office January 1, 2019 – January 1, 2023
- Preceded by: Honorable Ray West
- Succeeded by: Honorable Shane Britton

Personal details
- Born: May 26, 1969 (age 57) Fort Worth, Texas
- Citizenship: United States of America
- Party: Republican
- Children: Taylor Paul Lilly of Caldwell, Texas
- Parent(s): Randy Clay Lilly of Granbury, Texas
- Education: Bachelor of Science in Political Science, Masters of Criminal Justice, and Doctor of Psychology. Lilly is also a graduate of the Texas Law Enforcement Leadership and Command College Class #33 at Sam Houston State University.
- Alma mater: Texas Wesleyan University Texas State University
- Occupation: Judge, Chief of Police, Sheriff's Lieutenant, and University Professor
- Awards: Medal of Valor; Purple Heart; Distinguished Service Medal

Paul Douglas Lilly is an American judge who served as the 55th presiding judge for the State of Texas, County of Brown. He served from January 1, 2019 to January 1, 2023. Lilly has over 35 years of experience in the public safety profession with more than 20 years as a Reform Police Chief. In this capacity Lilly aided troubled police agencies with their restructuring and revision efforts. Lilly also served for 8 years as a professor of criminal justice and government at Howard Payne University.

== Early life and education ==
Paul Lilly was born in Fort Worth, Texas He attended college at the Texas Law Enforcement Leadership and Command College at Texas Wesleyan University, and worked night shifts as a patrol officer. He graduated in 1999. Prior to that, he received his BS in Political Science and Law from Texas Wesleyan in 1994.

In 2002 Lilly completed his Master of Science in Criminal Justice (M.S.C.J.) from Texas State University. He went on to pursue a doctorate from the University of Arizona GC and in 2014 graduated with a Doctor of Psychology and Criminology.

== Career ==
The United States Department of Justice recruited Lilly as a part of the International Criminal Investigative Training Assistance Program (ICITAP) to travel to war-torn Bosnia-Herzegovina to assist with the investigation as well as give lectures on modern democratic policing.

In 2008, Lilly joined a team of Police Chiefs belonging to the Law Enforcement Management Institute of Texas who traveled to Italy and presented western technologies and ideologies to the Italian law enforcement community.

In 2009 Lilly was selected by the United States Department of Justice to be commissioned as a Special Deputy United States Marshal where he was assigned to assist with the safety and security of the January 2009 U.S. Presidential Inauguration in Washington, D.C.

Later in 2009, Lilly retired from full-time law enforcement service, accepting a position as an Associate Professor of Criminal Justice at Howard Payne University. While a professor at HPU Lilly served simultaneously as the universoty's first Chief of Police and Director of Public Safety.

In November 2018 Lilly was elected the constitutional county judge of Brown County, Texas. He won by the most significant margins in county history and was sworn into office on January 1, 2019. on January 1, 2023 Lilly returned to education where he now serves as a professor for Carolina University.

City of Reno Texas in Parker County September 2025 through February 2026 where he resigned immediately after a meeting of a budget crisis. City of Reno in Parker County Texas Agenda February 23, 2026. https://drive.google.com/file/d/1cHblVCqe4RkB4oHqLR5GS52nf3VnPCs_/view?usp=drivesdk

== Recognition ==
In 1994, Lilly was elected the Chief of Police for the Dallas area suburb of Kaufman, the youngest officer ever In this position. He implemented community-oriented policing, which launched a career specializing in this and geographic-oriented policing. Lilly was included in the American Police Hall of Fame.

== Awards and honors ==
Lilly was awarded a Purple Heart medal for injuries he received in the line of duty, and was awarded the Distinguished Service Medal and a Congressional commendation for his community-oriented and problem-oriented policing efforts in 1998. He is the recipient of two Educational Achievement medals from the Texas Commission on Law Enforcement. Lilly received a Medal of Valor from the city of Caldwell, Texas for his "...courage and decisiveness under fire..."

To honor his more than twenty-five years of public safety service to the State of Texas and the United States of America, Lilly was awarded the J. Edgar Hoover Gold Medal for Distinguished Public Service by the National Association of Chiefs of Police in September 2015.

== Personal life ==
Lilly resides in Brownwood, Texas.
