= John Cordes =

Detective and NYPD Medal of Honor recipient (1890–1966)

- Born: John H. F. Cordes; August 9, 1890
- Died: April 19, 1966 (aged 75)
- Occupation: Detective
- Awards: New York City Police Department Medal of Honor (×2)

John H. F. Cordes (August 9, 1890 – April 19, 1966) was a detective in the New York Police Department, once described by New York mayor Jimmy Walker as "the city's best cop". He is the only detective to have been awarded the department's Medal of Honor twice.

== Career ==
=== Awards ===
Cordes was first awarded the medal in 1923 after coming across a Manhattan cigar store robbery in progress. As a result of his involvement, Cordes suffered five gunshot wounds, three of which came from another policeman for unknown reasons.

His second Medal of Honor was awarded in 1927 for his work in solving the kidnapping of real estate tycoon Abraham Scharlin.

=== Retirement ===
Cordes retired in 1949. Part of his career is described in the book "NYPD: Stories of Survival from the World's Toughest Beat".
