= Killing of Amir Locke =

2022 police killing in Minnesota

- Part of 2020–2023 Minneapolis–Saint Paul racial unrest
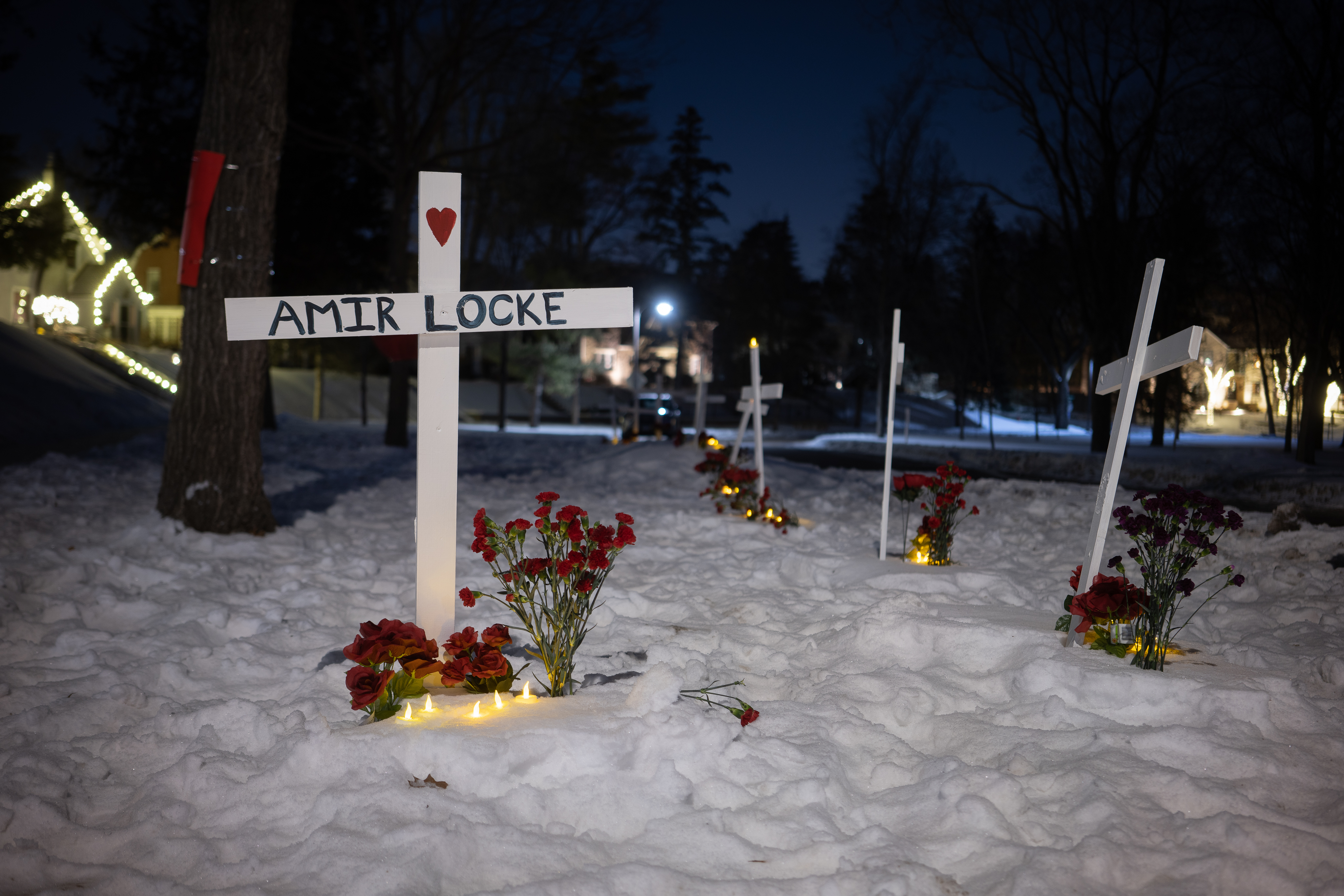
- Memorial for Amir Locke in Minneapolis, February 6, 2022
- Shooting location in Minneapolis
- Date: February 2, 2022
- Time: c. 6:48 am (CST; UTC-06:00)
- Location: Bolero Flats Apartment Homes Minneapolis, Minnesota, U.S.; 44.971746°N 93.274366°W
- Type: No-knock warrant, police shooting
- Cause: Saint Paul Police Department homicide investigation (Locke was not the suspect of the investigation)
- Filmed by: Police body camera
- Participants: Mark Hanneman (shooter); Other police officers
- Deaths: 1 (Amir Locke)
- Inquiries: Reviewed by state and county authorities
- Charges: None
- Footage: February 2, 2022 officer-involved shooting

Amir Locke, a 22-year-old Black American man, was fatally shot on February 2, 2022, by SWAT officer Mark Hanneman of the Minneapolis Police Department inside an apartment in Minneapolis, Minnesota, where police were executing a no-knock search warrant in a homicide investigation. The officer-involved shooting was reviewed by the office of Minnesota Attorney General Keith Ellison, the office of Hennepin County attorney Michael Freeman, and the Minnesota Bureau of Criminal Apprehension. Ellison and Freeman declined to file criminal charges against the officer who shot Locke in a report released on April 6, 2022.

Several protests were held in reaction to the shooting. Minneapolis Mayor Jacob Frey imposed a moratorium on most no-knock warrants on February 4. Multiple reviews of the no-knock warrant policy were announced, including by the Minneapolis City Council Policy and Government Oversight Committee and the Minneapolis Office of Police Conduct Review, as well as racial justice activist DeRay Mckesson and professor of police studies Peter Kraska of Eastern Kentucky University in coordination with the city. On April 8, Minneapolis banned "no knock" warrants in a new policy.

In mid-2023, Minnesota state lawmakers enacted restrictions on the use of no-knock warrants, but not a complete ban on their use.

== Background ==
=== Persons involved ===
Amir Locke was a 22-year-old Black man born in Maplewood, Minnesota, and raised in the Minneapolis–Saint Paul suburbs. According to his mother, Locke was starting a music career and had planned to move to Dallas the week after his death. In the three days leading up to the February 2 shooting, Locke had been staying at his cousin's apartment and sleeping on the couch.

Mark Hanneman had been a police officer in Minneapolis since 2015 and was a member of the Minneapolis Police Department's SWAT team. According to personnel records released by the department, Hanneman had three past complaints, all closed without disciplinary action. Prior to working with the police department, Hanneman was employed as a police officer in Hutchinson, Minnesota, starting in 2010. After an administrative suspension following the fatal shooting of Locke, Hanneman returned to active duty on February 28, 2022, but did not return to the SWAT team.

=== Search warrant ===
Locke was shot while police were executing a search warrant in relation to a homicide. Locke's cousin, a 17-year old at the time, was a suspect in the fatal shooting of Otis Elder in nearby Saint Paul on January 10, 2022. The Saint Paul Police Department applied for a "knock and announce" warrant, and the Minneapolis police department insisted on a no-knock warrant, according to the St. Paul Police Department. Police also had "probable cause pick up and holds" for three people. Amir Locke was not named in the search warrant and was not a target of the homicide investigation. A Hennepin County judge, Peter Cahill, authorized the release of warrant documents connected to the investigation.

== Incident ==
Still frame of Amir Locke from police body camera footage, February 2, 2022, released by the Minneapolis Police Department

On February 2, 2022, police unlocked and opened a door to an apartment at approximately 6:48 a.m. Police body camera footage reviewed by reporters "showed several officers quickly rushing into the apartment at the same time", several yelling "Police! Search warrant!", one officer yelling "Hands, hands!", and another yelling "Get on the ground!" Locke was lying on a couch wrapped in a blanket, and an officer kicked the couch. Locke then sat up and turned toward the officers while holding a gun, and in a still image released by police, his trigger finger is along the barrel of the gun, not the trigger. Hanneman then shot him twice in the chest and once in the wrist. The time from when police entered the unit, to when Locke was shot, was less than 10 seconds.

Locke was treated at the scene and transported to Hennepin Healthcare, where emergency medics pronounced him dead at 7:01 a.m.

== Investigations ==
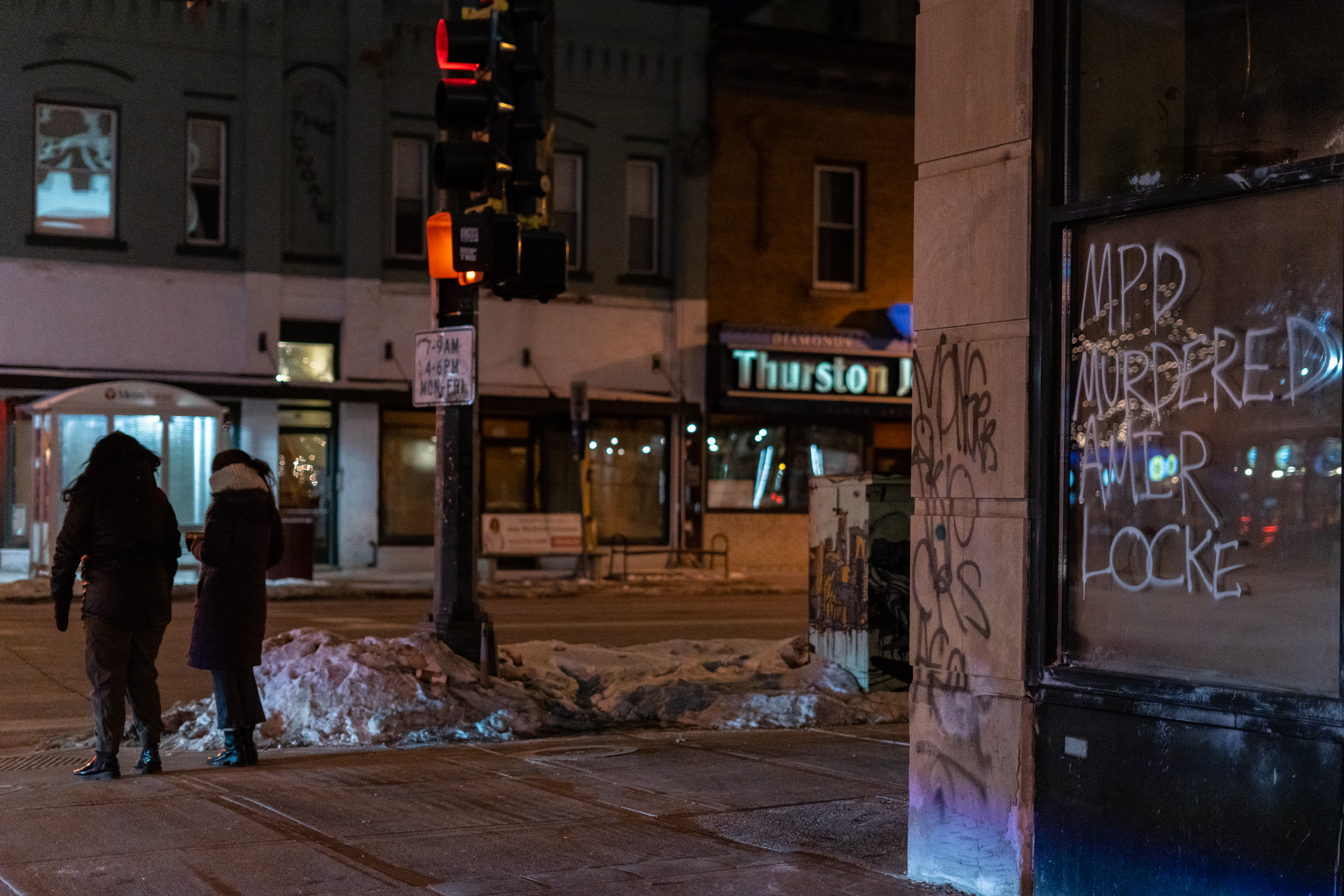
Graffiti in Minneapolis on February 2, 2022, states, "MPD murdered Amir Locke".

Immediately after the shooting, the Minnesota Bureau of Criminal Apprehension opened an investigation and Hanneman was placed on paid administrative leave. An autopsy report published on February 4, 2022, by the Hennepin County Medical Examiner classified the manner of Locke's death to be homicide due to gunshot wounds. The office of the Attorney General of Minnesota and the Hennepin County attorney's office jointly reviewed the case.

On April 6, 2022, state attorney general Keith Ellison and county attorney Michael Freeman jointly announced that they would not file criminal charges against Officer Mark Hanneman for fatally shooting Locke. Ellison and Freeman said in a joint statement that there was not enough evidence to prove beyond a reasonable doubt that Hanneman had violated Minnesota Statutes regarding use-of-force in shooting Locke. Ellison said, "It would be unethical for us to file charges in a case in which we know that we will not able to prevail because the law does not support the charges." The residents of the apartment and officers at the scene of the shooting made statements during the investigation, including Hanneman, who explained his justification for his use of deadly force.

During a news conference that announced the decision to not file charges, Attorney General Ellison said "Amir was a victim. He never should have been called a suspect" and that a gun raised in the direction of a police officer "constitutes a specifically articulable threat". During the press conference, Ellison also advocated for Congress to pass the George Floyd Justice in Policing Act to change some policing practices, increase training and oversight, and enhance federal prosecution of alleged police misconduct.

== No-knock warrant moratorium and restrictions ==
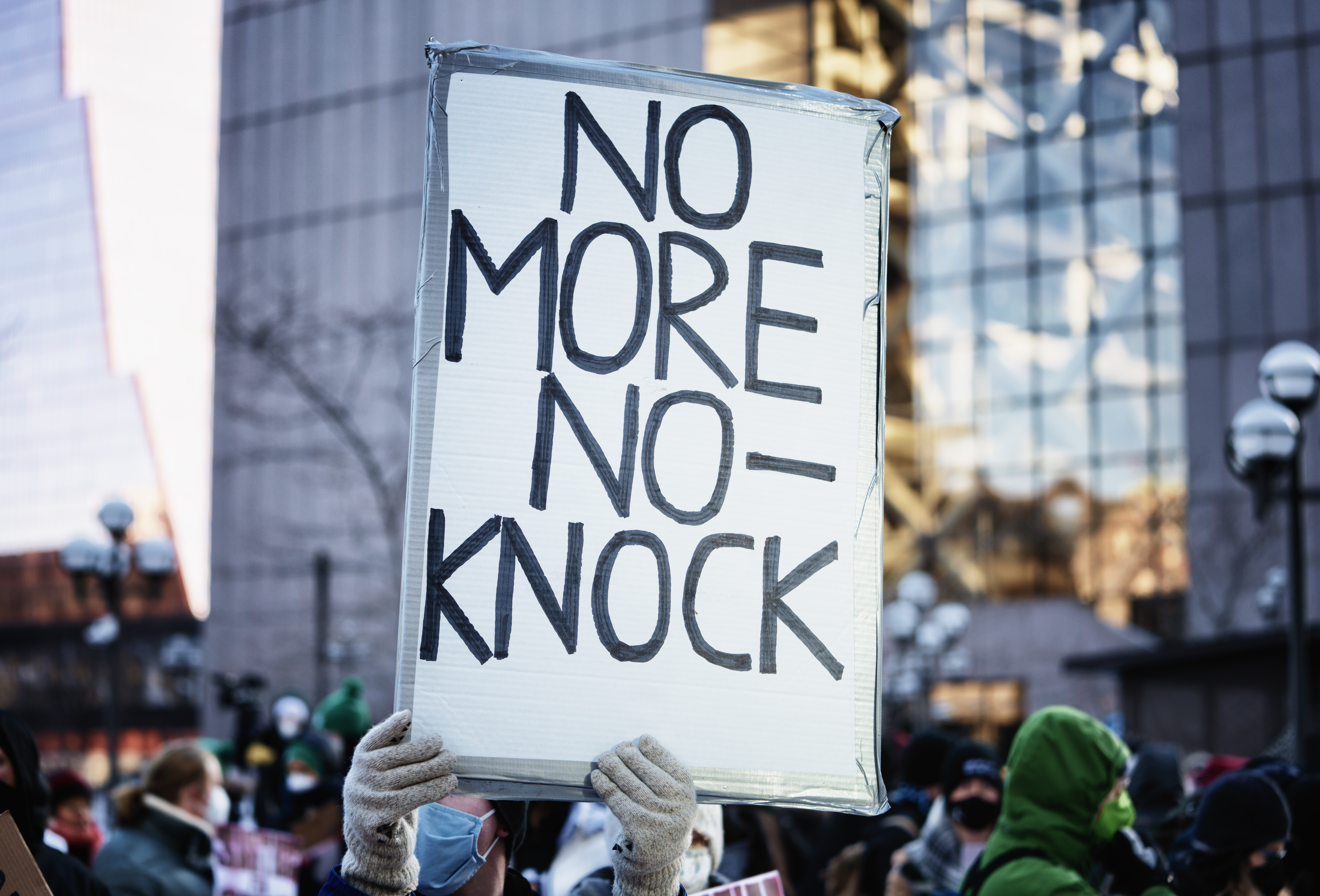
Protest sign, February 5, 2022

Following the killing of Amir Locke, Minneapolis Mayor Jacob Frey imposed a moratorium on no-knock warrants on February 4, with an exception for "an imminent threat of harm to an individual or the public and then the warrant must be approved by the Chief", such as hostage situations or extreme domestic violence. On February 7, the Minneapolis City Council Policy and Government Oversight Committee began discussion about no-knock warrants. The Minneapolis Office of Police Conduct Review announced a review of the no-knock warrant policy.

It was announced that racial justice activist DeRay Mckesson and professor of police studies Peter Kraska of Eastern Kentucky University would work with the city to review possible changes to the no-knock warrant policy during the moratorium. Several Minnesota lawmakers announced intentions to consider legislation that would ban most no-knock warrants; Governor Tim Walz indicated he would sign such legislation.

On April 8, 2022, Minneapolis implemented a new ban on "no knock" warrants, described by NBC News as "being called one of the strongest of its kind in the nation." Minnesota state lawmakers were unable to reach agreement before the end of the 92nd Minnesota Legislature in mid-2022 on further limits to "no-knock" warrants, after objections by Republicans.

The 93rd Minnesota Legislature in mid-2023 enacted new restrictions on no-knock warrants, but not a complete ban. Beginning July 1, 2023, police had to demonstrate in an application to the courts that a warrant could not reasonably be conducted while no one was home and that the people inside were threatening death or harm to others. Officers were also required to loudly announce themselves before entering.

== Reaction ==
=== Family ===
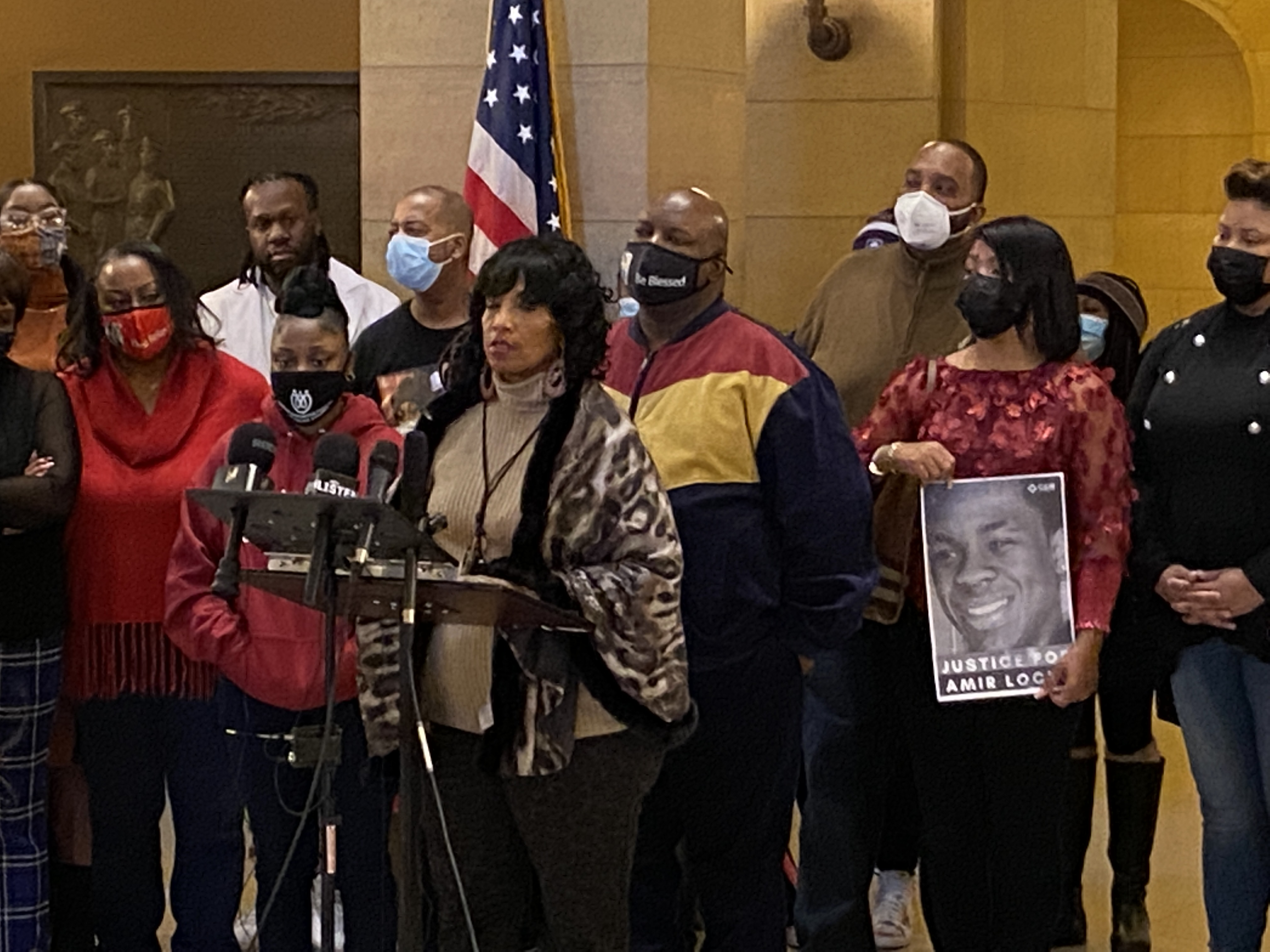
At a press conference, a family member holds a sign depicting Amir Locke, February 10, 2022

Locke's parents called his death an "execution". They added that their son did not live at the apartment. The family said Amir was "a deep sleeper" and may have been startled and "grabbed for his gun". The family also said he had a gun license and a concealed carry permit, and had a gun for protection due to his work for DoorDash. The BCA case file released two months after Locke's death revealed the origin of the gun, which had been purchased in April 2021 by a 25-year old Saint Paul man who declined to be interviewed by investigators.

Minnesota attorney Jeff Storms and civil rights attorneys Ben Crump and Antonio Romanucci were announced by Locke's family as legal counsel. On February 4, Crump stated, "If we've learned anything from Breonna Taylor, it's that we know no-knock warrants have deadly consequences for Black American citizens." At a press conference on February 7, Crump stated, "Warrants create chaotic, confusing circumstances that put everyone present at risk and those people are disproportionately marginalized people of color."

On February 10, family members of Locke and Breonna Taylor held a press conference with Crump, Storms, and Romanucci, and called for a ban on no-knock warrants.

=== Officials ===
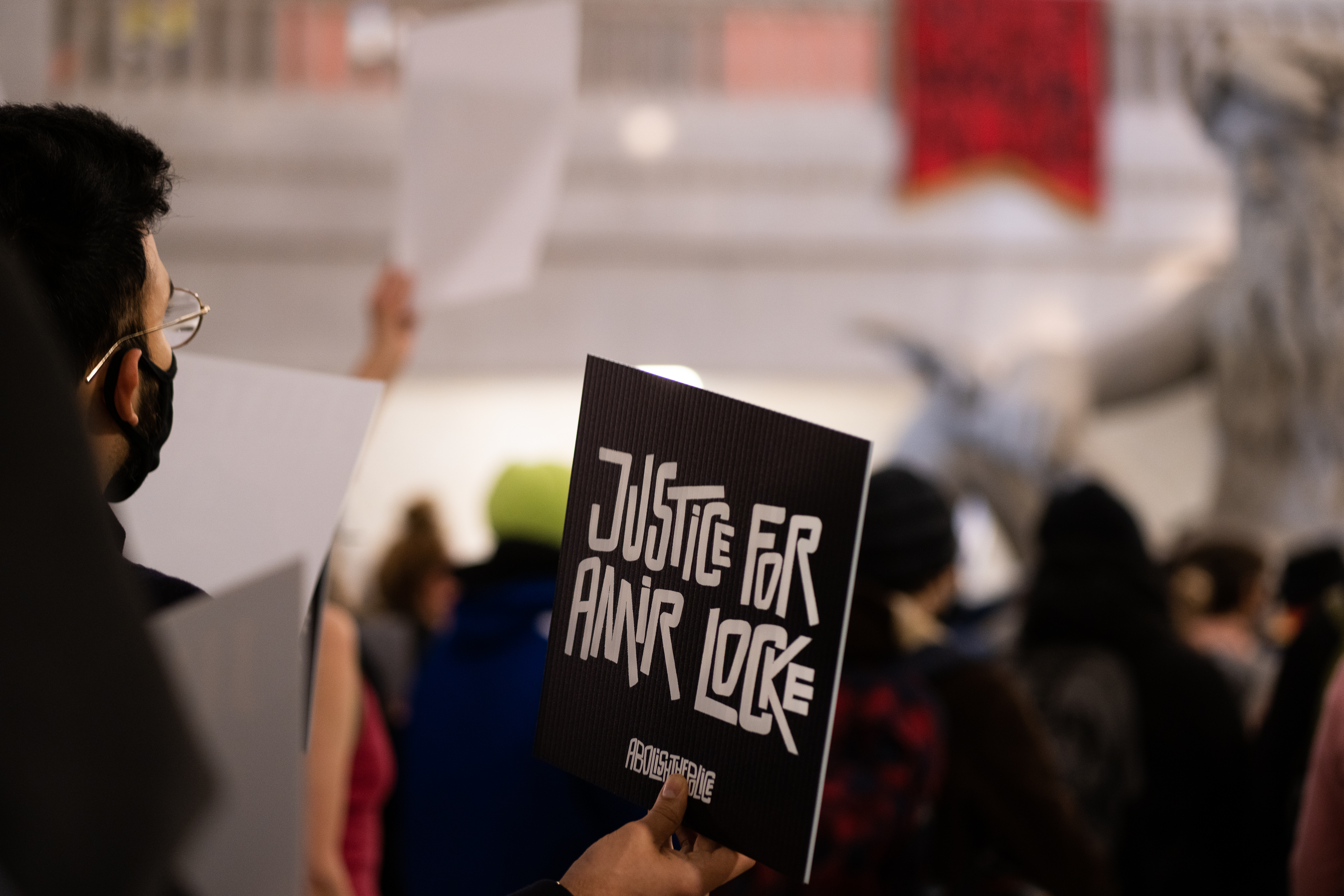
"Justice for Amir Locke" sign at a Minneapolis City Hall protest, February 11, 2022

On February 3, Minneapolis interim police chief Amelia Huffman said both a knock and no-knock warrant were obtained as part of a Saint Paul Police Department homicide investigation so the SWAT team could make its best assessment, and that it was "unclear" if Locke was connected to the St. Paul investigation. A spokesperson for the police department refused to comment due to the ongoing nature of the homicide investigation. Body camera footage was released to the public after Representative Ilhan Omar and members of the Minnesota House of Representatives called for the immediate release of the footage.

Based on a still shot from the body cam footage, Huffman stated "That's the moment when the officer had to make a split-second decision to assess [...] an articulable threat, that the threat was of imminent harm, great bodily harm or death, and that he needed to take action" to protect himself and other officers. Huffman also stated, "Ultimately, that decision of whether that threshold was met will be examined by the county attorney's office that reviews this case." Minnesota Attorney General Keith Ellison stated "Amir Locke's life mattered" when it was announced that his office will work with the Hennepin County attorney's office in its review.

Minnesota Representative Esther Agbaje, who resides in the building where Locke was shot and was home at the time, said "We need to continue to have a serious conversation about what does policing look like in this city, so it's safe—not only for the police officers but also for the people who live here." Minnesota House Majority Leader Ryan Winkler said, "Minnesotans deserve a thorough and impartial investigation into the events that led to Mr. Locke's death, including the Minneapolis Police Department sharing inaccurate information in the immediate aftermath."

=== Community groups ===
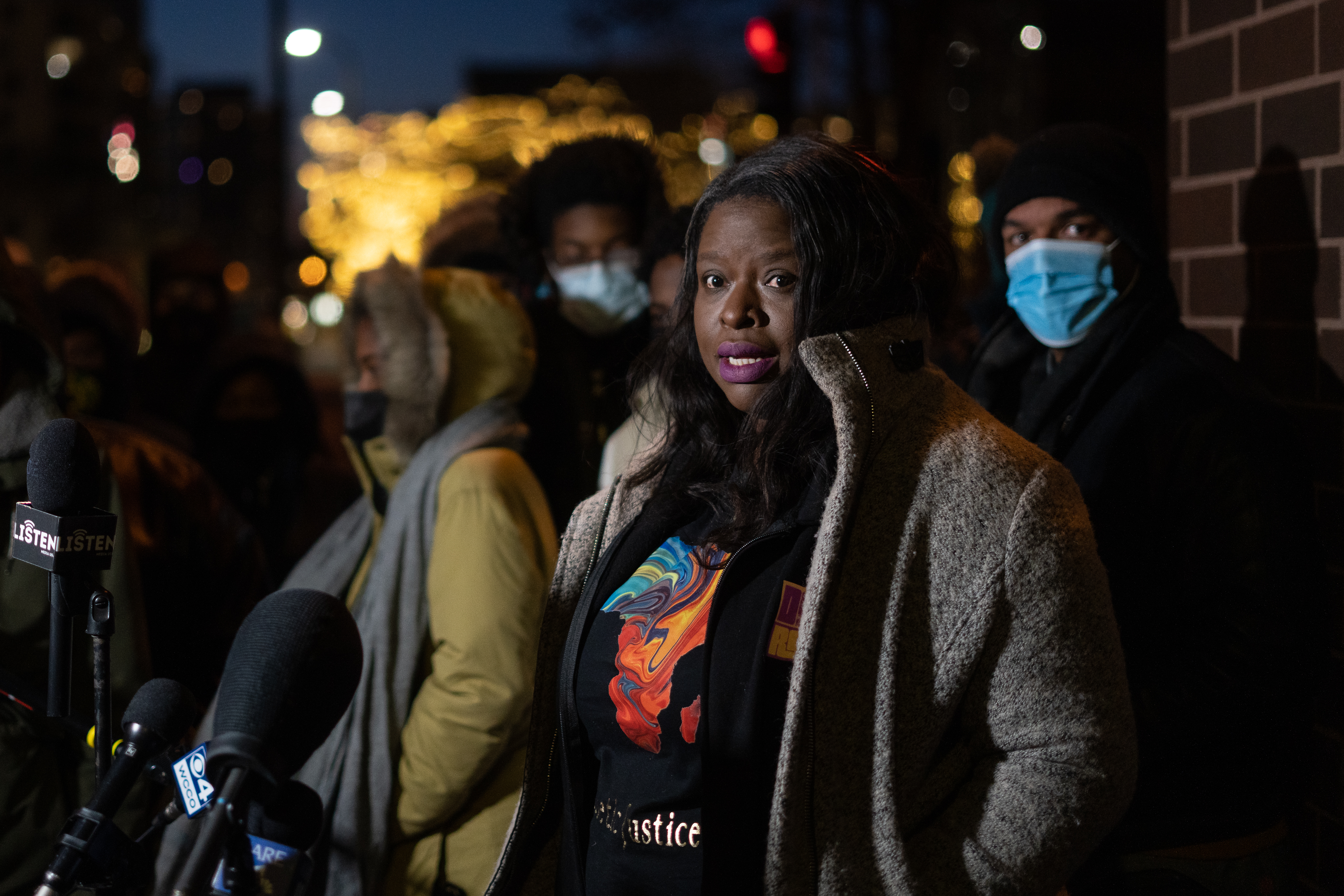
Civil rights activists speak about the killing of Amir Locke, February 2, 2022

On February 2, local civil rights activists held a vigil and asked police and city leaders for more information, including who authorized the SWAT team. On February 4, during a press conference by Interim Chief Amelia Huffman and Mayor Jacob Frey after the body camera footage was released, reporters and community members, including civil rights attorney Nekima Levy Armstrong, challenged Huffman about her initial description of the body camera footage. Huffman had initially stated officers "loudly and repeatedly announced police search warrant before crossing the threshold into the apartment" and then later encouraged people to "make their own assessment" after the footage was released.

On February 7, the Minneapolis NAACP called for a moratorium on no-knock warrants throughout the state, "pending a determination by the Peace Officers Standards and Training (POST) Board as to whether the no-knock procedure is an appropriate use of police power". The American Civil Liberties Union (ACLU) noted a lack of a police command to Locke to drop the gun or a warning that he would be shot. The ACLU of Minnesota called for a ban on no-knock warrants.

At George Floyd Square in Minneapolis, a Black Power fist sculpture was wrapped in white blankets in recognition of Locke.

According to Rob Doar, the senior vice president of governmental affairs in the Minnesota Gun Owners Caucus, "Mr. Locke did what many of us might do in the same confusing circumstances, he reached for a legal means of self-defense while he sought to understand what was happening." According to the Chair of the Minnesota Gun Owners Caucus, Bryan Strawser, "Black men, like all citizens, have a right to keep and bear arms. Black men, like all citizens, have the right to be secure in their persons, houses, papers, and effects against unreasonable search and seizure." A statement from the Police Officers Federation of Minneapolis, the local police union, includes: "Policing, particularly with a SWAT team, is a dangerous, high-stress profession where officers are forced to make important split-second decisions in defense of themselves and fellow officers, especially when weapons are involved".

== Protests ==
=== In Minneapolis—Saint Paul ===
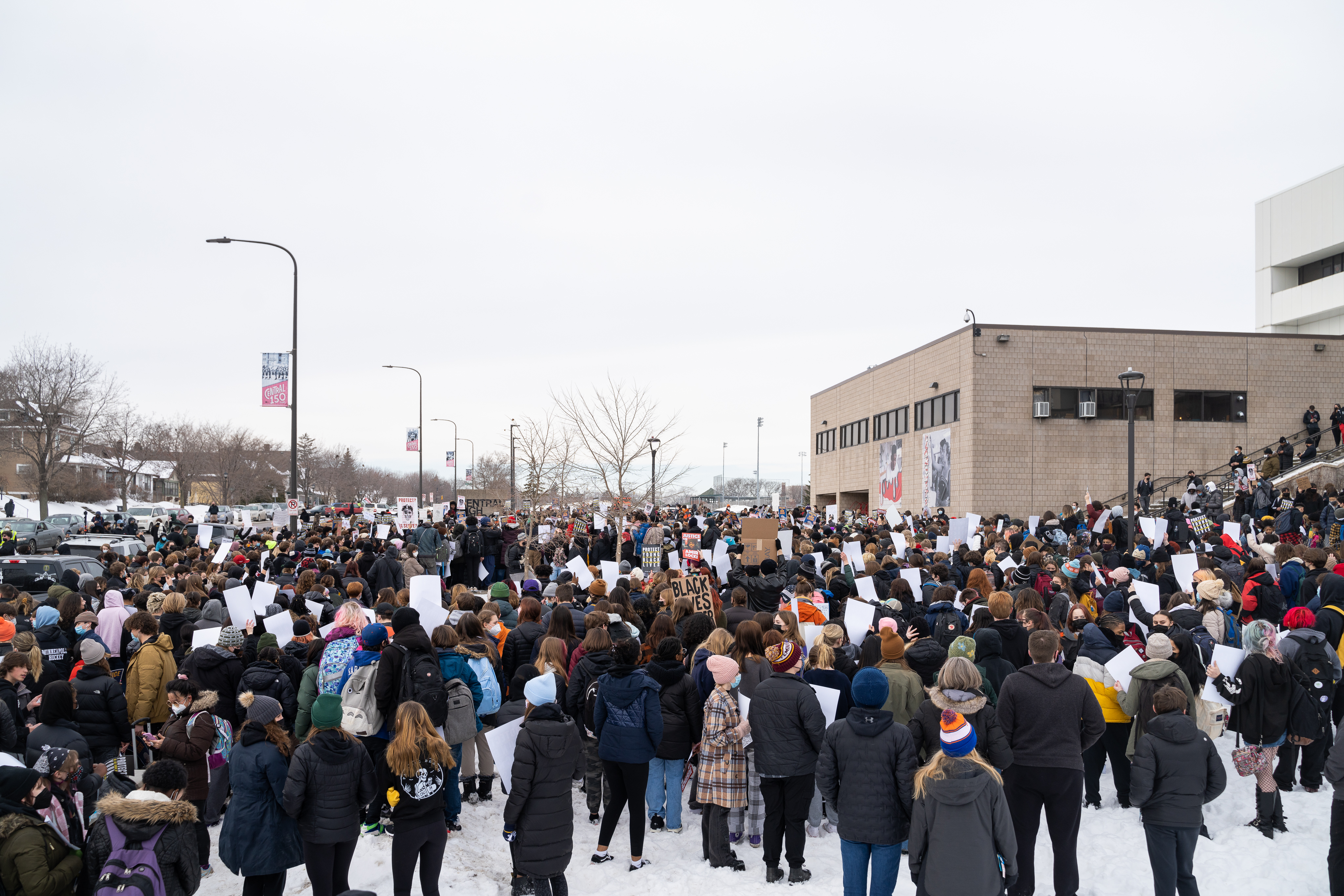
Student walk-out protest at Saint Paul Central High School, February 8, 2022

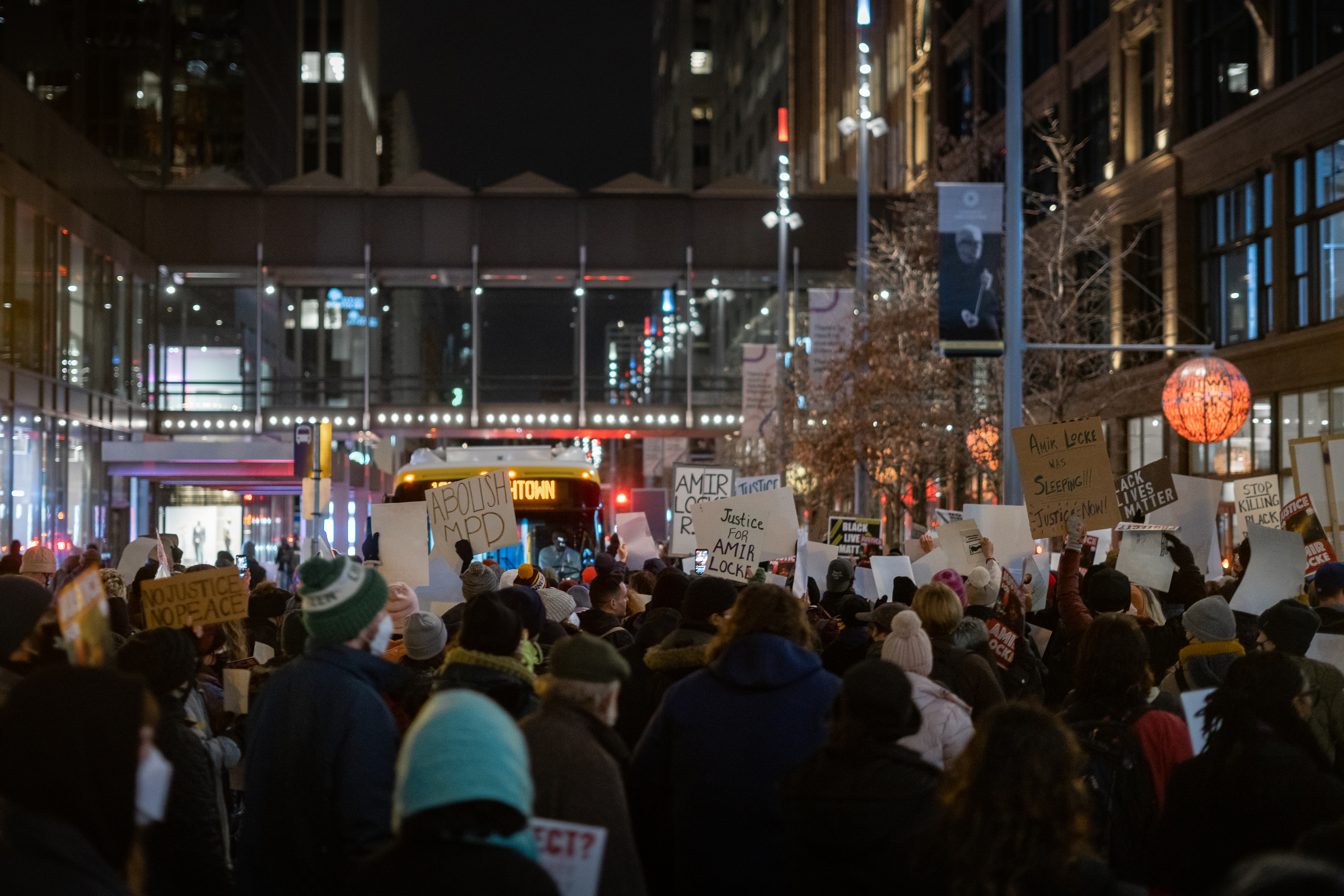
Protest march in downtown Minneapolis, February 8, 2022

On the evening of February 4, protesters in cars began honking outside Minneapolis City Hall and then moved through downtown towards where the shooting occurred, until about 8:00 p.m. On February 5, hundreds of people in Minneapolis protested Locke's death. On February 6, protesters gathered outside Huffman's home in the Cedar-Isles-Dean neighborhood of Minneapolis to demand her resignation.

On February 8, high school students in St. Paul and Minneapolis organized by MN Teen Activists walked out of class in protest and marched to the residence of the governor. Jerome Treadwell, the executive director of MN Teen Activists, stated, "Our message today is that we need to protect young black lives. We are humans, we deserve to live and we have hopes and dreams."

On February 11, a protest of approximately 100 people marched through south Minneapolis during the evening to demand justice over the police killings of Amir Locke and Winston Boogie Smith, who had been killed by law enforcement on June 3, 2021. Along Lake Street, several properties were vandalized and tagged with anti-police and anarchist graffiti. Some demonstrators threw rocks at the Minneapolis Police Department's fifth precinct station building.

On February 16, approximately 40 protesters gathered outside the home of Minneapolis Mayor Jacob Frey to demand justice over Locke's death.

On February 20, protesters gathered outside the Minnesota State Capitol building in Saint Paul for a "Justice for Amir Locke" rally.

On April 6, activists held a press conference and rally outside the Hennepin County Government Center in Minneapolis to express their anger and frustration over the decision by state and county authorities to not file criminal charges against the officer who fatally shot Locke. A protest march in downtown Minneapolis followed on April 8 that featured a crowd of approximately 80 people.

=== Elsewhere ===
In Chicago, Illinois, a protest over Locke's death was held on February 11.

A protest related to Locke's killing was planned in the Normandale Park area of Portland, Oregon, on February 19, 2022. According to court documents, a mass shooting near Normandale Park resulted in the death of two demonstrators and injured three, and ended after the shooter was shot by a bystander.

== Civil lawsuit ==
On February 3, 2023, attorney's for the family of Locke filed a wrongful death civil lawsuit against the City of Minneapolis.

== See also ==
- 2020–2022 United States racial unrest
- 2020–2022 Minneapolis–Saint Paul racial unrest
- List of killings by law enforcement officers in the United States, February 2022
- List of killings by law enforcement officers in Minnesota
