= New York City Police Department Combat Cross =

- Type: Medal
- Country: United States
- Presented by: New York City Police Department
- Ribbon: Green coloured Silk ribbon
- Obverse: Golden colored Maltese Cross with the seal of New York City in the center
- Reverse: Name of the holder and the year in which medal was awarded
- First award: July 19, 1934; 92 years ago

Precedence
- Next (higher): New York City Police Department Medal of Honor
- Next (lower): New York City Police Department Medal for Valor

The Police Combat Cross is the second highest departmental award of the New York City Police Department. The Police Combat Cross is awarded to police officers who, "having received Honorable Mention awards, successfully and intelligently perform an act of extraordinary heroism while engaged in personal combat with an armed adversary under circumstances of imminent personal hazard to life".

The Police Combat Cross was established August 14, 1934, by the Police Commissioner of New York City. The medal is a gold Maltese Cross with the seal of New York City set in the center and surrounded by the inscription, "For Valor, Police". The name of the holder and the year of awarding are engraved on the reverse. The cross is suspended by a ring from green silk ribbon. If the Combat Cross is awarded a second time, a gold palm leaf is set in the center of the ribbon. In 1998, the detail and casting of Police Combat Cross was enhanced to reflect its importance as the department's second highest medal.

The Police Combat Cross was first awarded July 19, 1934, to six members of the police department for heroic service in the previous year. More than two hundred members of the New York Police Department have been awarded the Police Combat Cross.

== See also ==
- Medals of the New York City Police Department
- New York City Police Department Medal of Honor
- New York City Police Department Medal for Valor
