= Lists of civil awards and decorations of the United States =

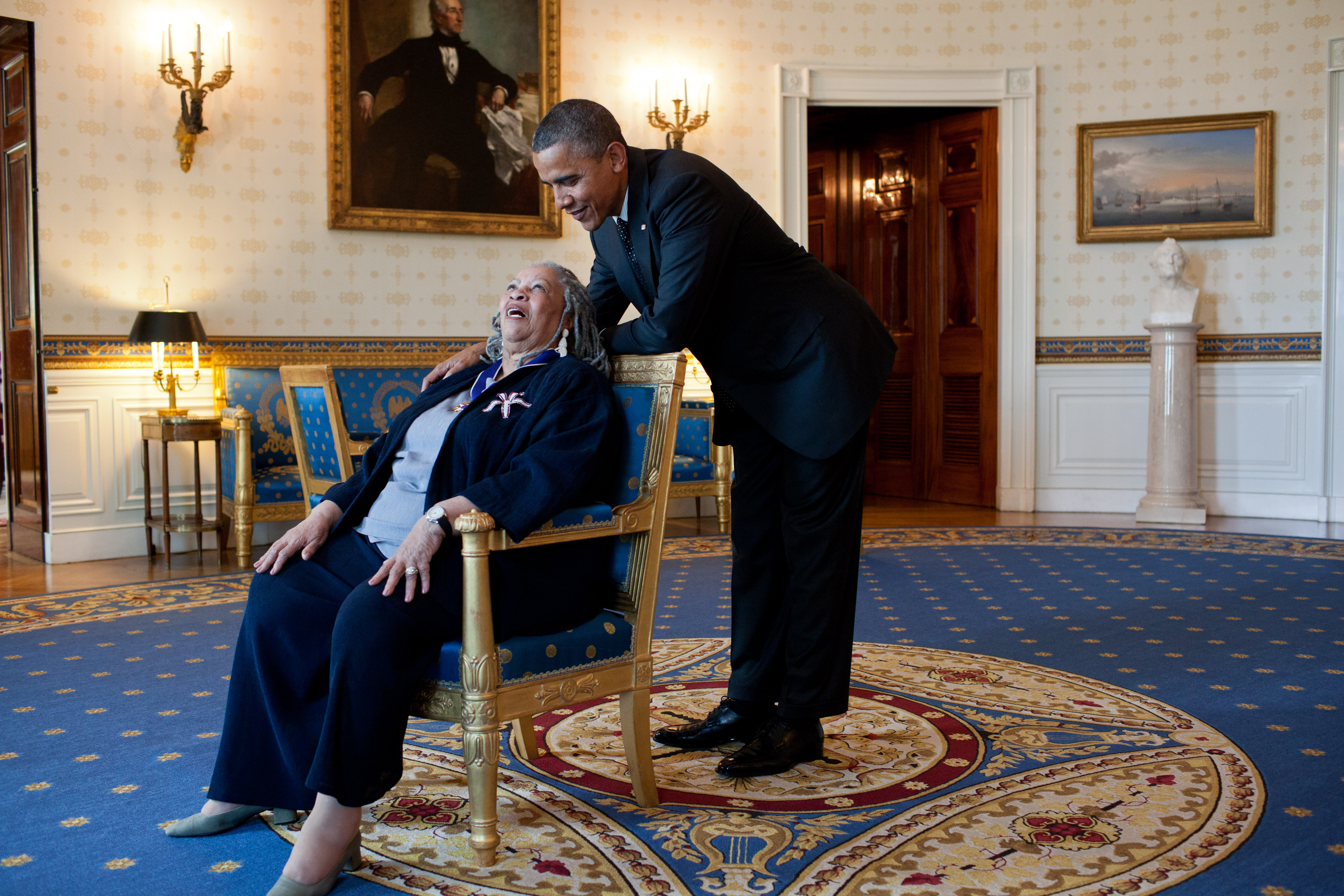
President Barack Obama presents novelist Toni Morrison with the Presidential Medal of Freedom at the White House on May 29, 2012.

Civil awards and decorations of the United States are awards and decorations of the United States of America which are bestowed by various agencies of the United States government for acts of accomplishment benefiting the nation as a whole. U.S. civil awards and decorations are typically issued for sustained meritorious service or for eminence in a field of endeavour, though there are also awards and decorations for a specific heroic act.

United States civil awards and decorations are issued by federal, state, and local authorities with the most recognizable decorations issued on the federal level. Certain other civil decorations may be authorized for wear on U.S. military uniforms, upon approval of the military service departments. Each of the military branches also maintains their own series of civil decorations separate from military awards.

The following is a listing of articles pertaining to United States civil awards and decorations.

== Federal government ==
- Awards and decorations of the United States government
- Awards and decorations of the United States Armed Forces
- Awards and decorations of the United States Merchant Marine

== State government ==
- Awards and decorations of the National Guard
- Awards and decorations of the State Defense Forces

== Local government ==
- United States law enforcement decorations

== Other organizations ==
- Awards and decorations of the Civil Air Patrol
- Awards and decorations of the United States Naval Sea Cadet Corps
- Awards and decorations of the United States Coast Guard Auxiliary
- Cadet awards of the Virginia Tech Corps of Cadets
- Medals and badges of the Boy Scouts of America

== See also ==
- Category:Military awards and decorations of the United States (including for civilians)
