= Sanford Police Department =

Law enforcement agency in Florida, U.S.

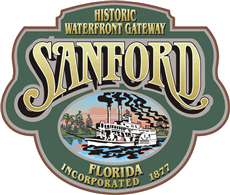
Seal of Sanford, Florida

The Sanford Police Department is a police agency in Sanford, the county seat of Seminole County, Florida. It employs 130 sworn police officers alongside 17 civilian employees, and Police Chief Smith. Prior to Chief Smith, Richard Myers was the Interim Police Chief. Myers is the former Chief of Police in Colorado Springs, Colorado, and Appleton, Wisconsin. In March 2012, Sanford Police Chief Bill Lee took a temporary leave of absence during the department's investigation of the shooting death of teenager Trayvon Martin, and Captain Darren Scott was named acting chief of police. Myers took over from Scott in May 2012. In April 2013, Former Elgin, Illinois Deputy Police Chief Cecil Smith took over as the department's chief.

The department's officers are represented by Lodge 140 of the Fraternal Order of Police.

== History ==
In 2003, the Sanford Police Department was awarded a $375,000 federal grant from the Community Oriented Policing Services to help pay for five officers' salaries.

In February 2010, press reports indicated one officer was fired, and another, Ned Golden Jr., was suspended for two weeks after sending sexist and racist text messages on a department computer.

In 2010, a Florida Department of Law Enforcement report noted that Sanford police Officer Christopher McClendon had misused his official position by helping a car dealer recover cars from delinquent customers in exchange for having his own car payments forgiven.

In November, 2010, the Sanford Police Department moved to a new $20 million, 76,000-square-foot Public Safety Complex, which it shares with the Sanford Fire Department and a five-bay fire station. Built to withstand 150 mph hurricane winds, the two-story complex also houses Sanford's emergency operations center. The police and fire departments have separate and much larger facilities with a shared atrium, and there is a public meeting room. The police department also has a room specifically to conduct voice stress analysis, a type of lie detector test, and the fire department's communication system is integrated with a new dispatching system in Seminole County. The building uses an integrated video surveillance and access control system from Genetec. Sanford's Public Safety Complex is located between the city's Goldsboro Community and the State Farmers Market. At the time of its planning, the complex was considered part of Sanford's efforts to revitalize the Goldsboro area.

In January, 2011, the same Officer Golden mentioned earlier was assigned to retraining after approaching a car of people at a gas station with a drawn gun. Officer Golden grabbed the car when it pulled away. He then claimed the driver of the car tried to kill him by driving away while he held on to the car. No charges were filed in the case. In August 2011, after an investigation by the Florida Department of Law Enforcement, Golden was fired. The state report recommended he be charged with filing a false police report, official misconduct and assault with a deadly weapon. No charges were filed by the State Attorney's Office. Officer Golden is the son of the head of the local police union.

In that same month, the chief of the department, Brian Tooley, took an early retirement as a result of an incident involving one of his officer's sons. Justin Collison was caught on video tape in an unprovoked assault on a homeless man outside of a bar. Press reports indicate Collison, the son of a police lieutenant, was not arrested or charged with a crime by the Sanford Police Department until the video became public 7 weeks later.

In April 2011, Officer DeAnthony Shamar was fired when it was discovered he had used a boy scout as a proxy buyer in a drug investigation. In his nine years as a Sanford police officer, Shamar had been investigated by the department 25 times.

=== Killing of Trayvon Martin ===
The killing of Trayvon Martin took place on 26 February 2012. That evening, a civilian neighborhood watch captain named George Zimmerman called the Sanford police to report a suspicious person. The dispatcher asked Zimmerman not to pursue. Zimmerman hung up the phone, and an altercation occurred in which he shot and killed Martin. Sanford Police arrived after Martin was shot and took Zimmerman into custody. He was released after 5 hours of questioning. The police chief said that there was no evidence to refute Zimmerman's claim of having acted in self-defense, and that under Florida's Stand Your Ground statute, the police were prohibited by law from making an arrest. The incident led to protests against the Sanford Police Department, national and international attention in the news media, and investigations by state and federal government. Race was an issue as Martin was Black and Zimmerman is a mixed-race Hispanic.

On 22 March 2012, Florida Governor Rick Scott appointed a special prosecutor, Angela Corey, to take over the investigation. On the same day, Bill Lee, chief of the Sanford Police at the time of the shooting, announced that he had temporarily stepped down from his position, stating "my involvement in this matter is overshadowing the process." Lee had received criticism for his handling of the investigation, and on March 21, the City Commission, including the mayor, passed a motion of no confidence in the police chief. On 23 April 2012, Lee offered a letter of resignation but it wasn't accepted by the Sanford City Commission. In May, 2012, former Colorado Springs, Colorado, Police Chief Richard Myers was appointed to lead the Sanford Police Department by City Manager Norton Bonaparte. In June 2012, Bill Lee was dismissed by Bonaparte, on the grounds that he had lost the confidence of the community.

During the trial of George Zimmerman, the Sanford Police Department was accused of "stolen valor" when it was revealed on national television that their officers were wearing U.S. military awards, including such decorations as the Defense Distinguished Service Medal, with simply different names as police awards. After numerous complaints to both the Sanford police and the Fraternal Order of Police, the department discontinued this practice of wearing U.S. military awards in lieu of unique police decorations.

=== 2012 to present ===
In December 2012, Officer Stephan Santiago was charged with leaving the scene of an accident after a chase that culminated with him driving his car the wrong way on the street, bumping off the curbs several times. Santiago passed a field sobriety test and the police department promised an internal investigation. The same officer had been involved in a barroom brawl in 2008.

Cecil Smith became chief of the department starting in April 2013. Smith had served as deputy chief of the Elgin, Illinois police.

In late December 2013, Officer Joseph Jermaine Wiggins pleaded no contest to taking a bribe from a man in exchange for his not being cited for a traffic offense in October 2011. He was sentenced to five years on probation and banned from working as a police officer.

In July 2014, the department paid $75,000 to man who threatened a lawsuit. He had claimed two police officers used excessive force arresting him. The department did not admit any misconduct.

Also in July 2014, Officer Mickey Hinkley was fired after an internal investigation determined he had threatened a prisoner with his taser.
