= Zilli (surname) =

Zilli is an Italian surname. Notable people with the surname include:

- Aldo Zilli (born 1956), Italian-British celebrity chef
- Carlos Pedro Zilli (1954–2021), Brazilian–Guinea-Bissauan bishop
- Emma Zilli (1864–1901), Italian soprano
- Ishtiyaq Ahmad Zilli (born 1942), Indian scholar
- Massimo Zilli (born 2002), Italian footballer
- Mehmed Zilli, the real name of Ottoman traveler Evliya Çelebi (1611 – c. 1682)
- Nina Zilli (born 1980), Italian singer-songwriter

== See also ==
- Zilli (disambiguation)
