= New York City Police Department Medal for Valor =

- Type: Medal
- Country: United States
- Presented by: New York City Police Department
- First award

Precedence
- Next (higher): New York City Police Department Combat Cross
- Next (lower): New York City Police Department Meritorious Police Duty Medal

The New York City Police Department's Medal for Valor is the department's third highest medal. It is conferred upon police officers for acts of outstanding personal bravery intelligently performed in the line of duty at imminent personal hazard to life under circumstances evincing a disregard for personal consequences.

The New York City Police Department (NYPD) Medal for Valor is one of the highest honors awarded to members of the NYPD. It recognizes acts of extraordinary courage and bravery displayed by NYPD officers while in the line of duty, often involving personal risk or danger. The Medal for Valor is one of several awards given by the NYPD to honor its officers for their exceptional service and dedication to the community.

In order to receive the Medal for Valor, officers need to have their names nominated by other officers or citizens to a panel which reviews their nomination before forwarding it to Commissioner of the New York City Police Department, who then makes the final decision.

The Medal for Valor is typically presented during the NYPD Medal Day ceremony, an annual event held to honor the exceptional service and achievements of NYPD officers, where various awards and medals are presented to officers, recognizing their outstanding performance, dedication, and commitment to serving the people of New York City.

Recipients of the Medal for Valor are well respected within their department and the community for their bravery and commitment to public service.

== Criteria and selection process ==
The Medal for Valor is awarded based on the following criteria:

Acts of bravery and heroism that go beyond the normal call of duty. Demonstrating exceptional courage in the face of imminent danger or life-threatening situations. Putting the officer's own life at risk to save others or protect public safety. The selection process for the Medal for Valor includes nominations from fellow officers, supervisors, or members of the community. These nominations are reviewed by a panel, which evaluates the circumstances and actions of the nominee. The panel then makes recommendations to the Police Commissioner, who makes the final decision on the awarding of the Medal for Valor.

== Design ==
The image of the Police Memorial Statue, representing the years of selfless service that New York City police officers have given to its citizens, is cast in the center of the medal. Mediterranean evergreen laurel leaves, representing honor and glory dating back to ancient Rome, surround the center of the medal. The outer background and ribbon are police blue. The words "For Valor, Police Department City of New York" are written on the face of the medal in gold lettering. The two gold stars signify the level of importance associated with this recognition. The recipient's name is engraved on the reverse side of the medal.

The respective breast bar is a solid blue bar.

== Awards ==
=== 2006 ===
At the 2006 Medal Day Ceremony in New York, Mayor Michael Bloomberg and NYPD Police Commissioner Raymond Kelly awarded 13 Medals for Valor:

- Detective James Monaco, Queens Special Victims Squad Detective Bureau
- Police Officer Ernest Kenner, 73rd Precinct
- Sergeant Anthony J. Sestito, 122nd Precinct
- Detective Hector Natal, 33rd Detective Squad
- Police Officer Branden Pedrosa, 33rd Precinct
- Sergeant Gilbert Noa, Transit District 12
- Detective Josue Barreto, Bronx Robbery Squad
- Police Officer Mehmet Buyukdag, 48th Precinct
- Police Officer James Jacoberger, 43rd Precinct
- Police Officer Gregory Jeung, 48th Precinct
- Detective Michael Callan, Manhattan North Homicide Task Force Detective Bureau
- Detective Thomas Clarke, Manhattan North Homicide Task Force Detective Bureau
- Captain Daniel Carione, Internal Affairs Bureau

=== 2007 ===
At the 2007 Medal Day Ceremony in New York, Mayor Michael Bloomberg and NYPD Police Commissioner Raymond Kelly awarded 14 Medals for Valor:

- Detective Arturo Willis – Counter Terrorism Division
- Police Officer Carlos Arroyo – Brooklyn South Gang Squad
- Retired Police Officer Kai Wong – 47th Precinct
- Sergeant William Danchak – Employee Management Division
- Sergeant Edward Deighan – 70th Precinct
- Sergeant Richard Pignateli – 67th Precinct
- Detective James Halleran – Emergency Service Squad 8
- Police Officer Margaret Zaffarese – Police Academy
- Lieutenant Brian Connolly – 9th Precinct
- Police Officer Robert Burns – 113th Precinct
- Police Officer Shannon Pearl – 113th Precinct
- Sergeant Michael Ruzzi – Police Service Area 7
- Police Officer Joseph Foreman, III – School Safety Division
- Police Officer Brian Sheehy – 120th Precinct

=== 2008 ===
Twelve Medals of Valor were awarded at the 2008 Medal Day ceremony by Mayor Michael R. Bloomberg and Police Commissioner Raymond W. Kelly:

- Sergeant Robert Henderson – Intel Operations and Analysis Section
- Detective Herbert Martin – 81st Detective Squad
- Police Officer Brendan Owens – Manhattan North Robbery Squad
- Lieutenant Timothy Farrell – 101st Precinct
- Sergeant Patrick O’Neill – Counter Terrorism
- Police Officer Joseph Cruzado – Gang Squad Queens
- Sergeant Brian O’Toole – Internal Affairs Bureau
- Police Officer Ronald Martiny – 103rd Precinct
- Detective George Sichler – Harbor Unit
- Detective Thomas Stevens – Harbor Unit
- Detective Francis Vitale – Harbor Unit
- Police Officer John Purcell – Harbor Unit

=== 2009 ===
Thirteen Medals of Valor were awarded at the 2009 Medal Day ceremony by Mayor Michael R. Bloomberg and Police Commissioner Raymond W. Kelly:

- Detective Richard Burt – Intelligence Division
- Sergeant Pedro Candia – PBBX Task Force
- Police Officer Edward Cantaloupe – 44th Precinct
- Police Officer Gregory Chin – Transit District #4
- Sergeant Louis DeCeglie – Narcotics Borough Manhattan South
- Police Officer Maribeth Diaz – MTS Precinct
- Former Police Officer Stephen Donohue – 47th Precinct
- Lieutenant Kevin Gallagher – Narcotics Borough Brooklyn South
- Sergeant Michael Gaudio – 44th Precinct
- Sergeant Michael Raso – PSA #5
- Detective Alfred Robinson – Detective Borough Brooklyn North Operations
- Retired Detective Dominick Romano – PBQS
- Detective James Schweiker – 17th Precinct

=== 2010 ===
There were fifteen Medals of Valor awarded by Mayor Michael R. Bloomberg and Police Commissioner Raymond W. Kelly at the 2010 Medal Day ceremony.

- Sergeant Felipe Gomez
- Sergeant Kenneth Russo
- Retired Sergeant John Boesch
- Detective Michael Corvi
- Detective John Lunt
- Detective Timothy Murphy
- Detective Michael O’Brien
- Detective Frank Pinto
- Detective Frank Sarrica
- Detective Anthony Schaffer
- Police Officer Rory Mangra
- Police Officer Brian McIvor
- Police Officer Erik Merizalde
- Police Officer Charles Steiger
- Police Officer Michael Tavolario

=== 2011 ===
Mayor Michael R. Bloomberg and Police Commissioner Raymond W. Kelly awarded six Medals of Valor at the 2011 Medal Day ceremony.

- Police Officer Danny Acosta
- Detective Raymond Clair
- Police Officer Tara Hayes
- Detective Patrick LaScala
- Police Officer Richard Lopez
- Police Officer Brian McIvor

=== 2012 ===
Mayor Michael R. Bloomberg and Police Commissioner Raymond W. Kelly awarded fifteen Medals of Valor at the 2012 Medal Day ceremony.

- Lieutenant Lawrence Serras – Emergency Services Unit
- Sergeant Robert Abramson – Patrol Borough Manhattan North Anti-Crime Unit
- Sergeant William Coyle – 28th Precinct
- Detective Steven Browning – Aviation Unit
- Detective Christopher Condon – Emergency Service Unit
- Detective Keith Connelly – Emergency Services Unit
- Detective Glenn Estrada – 75th Precinct
- Detective Peter Quinn – Emergency Services Unit
- Detective Nicholas Romano – Queens Gang Squad
- Detective Michael Sileo – Aviation Unit
- Police Officer Zachary Bonner −32nd Precinct
- Police Officer Nicholas Douglas (retired) – 32nd Precinct
- Police Officer Derrick Edouard – 41st Precinct
- Police Officer Daniel Ehrenreich – 32nd Precinct
- Police Officer Ryan Norman – Emergency Services Unit

=== 2013 ===
Mayor Michael R. Bloomberg and Police Commissioner Raymond W. Kelly awarded thirteen Medals of Valor at the 2013 Medal Day ceremony.

- Lieutenant Patrick Brown – 23 Precinct Detective Squad
- Sergeant Anthony Gulotta – Patrol Borough Brooklyn North (75 Precinct Impact)
- Sergeant Javier Rodriguez – 113 Precinct
- Detective Fredric Daughtry – 63 Precinct Detective Squad
- Detective Alexander Grandstaff – 81 Precinct Detective Squad
- Detective Vito Nicoletta – 75 Precinct Detective Squad
- Police Officer Arvid Flores – 43 Precinct
- Police Officer Jason Jackson – 75 Precinct
- Police Officer Zahid Mehmood – 78 Precinct Detective Squad
- Police Officer Paul Mertens – Detective Borough Bronx
- Police Officer Peter Naughton – Patrol Borough Queens North Specialized Units
- Police Officer Richard Pengel – 25 Precinct Detective Squad
- Police Officer Daniel Trione – 75 Precinct

== See also ==
- Medals of the New York City Police Department
- New York City Police Department Medal of Honor
- New York City Police Department Combat Cross
