= William Lilly (disambiguation) =

William Lilly (1602–1681) was an English astrologer and occultist.

William Lilly may refer to:

- William Lilly (politician) (1821–1893), American politician
- William Lily (grammarian) (1468–1522), English scholar and Latin grammarian
- William Samuel Lilly (1840–1919), English barrister and writer
- William Liley (1929–1983), New Zealand surgeon and perinatal physiologist
