= National Association of Chiefs of Police =

US non-profit organization

NACOP
- National Association of Chiefs of Police
- Formation: May 25, 1967; 59 years ago
- Type: Nonprofit
- Registration no.: EIN 59-1164090
- Legal status: 501(c)(3) charity
- Purpose: Humanitarian, Business and Industry
- Headquarters: 6350 Horizon Dr., Titusville
- Location: Florida, 32780, US
- Region served: National
- Services: Education, scholarships; survivor upport
- Fields: Law enforcement; Security; Education
- President: Jack Rinchich
- Senior Vice-President: Brian Smith
- Board of directors: Yes
- Key people: Barry Shepherd, Executive Director; Brent Shepherd, CFO
- Subsidiaries: COP Magazine
- Revenue: $2,997,437 (2020)
- Expenses: $1,755,00 (58.5% of revenue) (2020)
- Funding: $5,500,000
- Staff: 32 (2020)
- Website: www.nacoponline.org

The National Association of Chiefs of Police (NACOP) is a 501(c)(3) charity organization whose mission is to support American law enforcement, reserves, and security personnel; their families; and organizations through programs and services it offers to command structure leaders. The organization, based in Titusville, Florida, is active in all U.S. states and territories. In 2020, NACOP spending on its programs, awards, and educational materials totaled 45.5% of revenue.

== Services and support ==
NACOP offers training to law enforcement and security personnel through films, seminars, booklets and other printed materials, and training sessions. The organization's Law Enforcement Education Program ("LEEP") helps in the tactical training of officers to a world-class level. The civilian based Safety Training Education Program ("STEP") is for "...everyday citizens who want to learn firearms safety, hand-to-hand defensive measures, active shooter response methods, and more..."

The organization recognizes and awards those members of the law enforcement and security fields that have shown valor in the field. NACOP also offers support of officers and their families through its "Fund for Paralyzed & Disabled Police Officers" in times of need. Support includes scholarship programs for both the disabled officer and family members, and the awarding of the Law Enforcement Purple Heart medal for injuries received in the line of duty.

NACOP has started a resource and grant program designed to assist small to mid-sized departments (less than 200 officers) in procuring canine officers, especially for participation in the war on drugs, funded by public donations through the Community Matching Gift program launched on April 1, 2003. Depending on need, the training alone of a canine officer and its handler will run from $4500 to $10,000 per department. NACOP partners with communities that seek to affordably add a canine unit to their arsenal in the fight against crime, as well as in community education and public relations. Over $1,122,000 has been awarded to police departments since the inception of the program.

On January 20, 2023, the city of New Orleans announced on Twitter that they had asked NACOP to head up the city's national search for a new NOPD supervisor.

=== Publications ===
The Chief of Police Magazine (COP Magazine) is the official publication of NACOP, and is published monthly online. Training pamphlets and booklets are also offered through the LEEP and STEP educational programs.

=== Museum ===
NACOP founded and funds the 30,000 ft^{2} American Police Hall of Fame & Museum, located in Titusville, Florida, that is dedicated to the officers and community leaders who have gone above and beyond the call of duty. The museum exhibit explains that—on average—every 57 hours an officer is killed in America. Police Memorial Day on May 15, marks the annual date when the engraved plaques of officers who have died in the line of duty in the past year are unveiled in a ceremony at the museum. On view are the more than 9,000 names of slain police officers from the past 60 years.

=== Shooting Center ===
The organization's education mission includes the availability of the state-of-the-art Shooting Center, open 24 hours per day, to law enforcement, security personnel, and the public, where novices and experts alike can come and hone their skills and increase their knowledge in the safe use of firearms on a 24-lane range.

== Structure ==
The organization has two executive officers, Chief Executive Director Barry Shepherd, and CFO Brent Shepherd, as well as a board of directors. The organizations offers membership to command rank law enforcement and security personnel within the United States and her territories and possessions.

== Awards programs ==
NACOP sponsors award programs to encourage citizen involvement in their communities, and to award those citizens and law enforcement officers who exhibit bravery and valor in the act of keeping their communities safe. Annual awards are distributed through its American Police Hall of Fame National Awards Program and the Outstanding Officer of the Year selection.

== Finances and fundraising ==
As of 2020, NACOP uses 45.5% of annual revenue in support of its programs and initiatives, while 13% of funds go to administrative costs and 41.5% of funds go towards organizational expenses. The charity carries a 72% rating (Note: A 72% rating gives the organization a two/four-stars ranking from Charity Navigator. This organization is scored entirely (100%) on the Accountability & Finance beacon metric.) for ranked charitable organizations from the Charity Navigator oversight body; and was under a "moderate concern advisory" issued by Charity Navigator from April 2021 to July 2022. (Note: Accountability & Finance scores are created from data taken from IRS Form 990. Ranking data includes all data up to FY 2020, the most recent year available (as of January 2023).)

Beside public donations, there were three large funding entities that provided operating capital to NACOP:

- The Brevard Cultural Alliance, community support – $6,012
- The Jesse H and Susan R Oppenheimer Foundation operating fund – $1050, and
- The ZG Foundation, general support – $500

Total grants, contributions, and fundraising for the fiscal year ending September 2020 brought $2,435,469 in revenue, as opposed to the previous year's total of $2,335,622; an increase of 4.3%.

== See also ==
- International Association of Chiefs of Police, a similar, world-wide organization
