= Killing of Richard Ward =

2022 police shooting in Pueblo West, Colorado

- Date: February 22, 2022
- Location: Liberty Point International Middle School Pueblo County, Colorado, United States
- Type: Shooting by law enforcement
- Perpetrator: Charles McWhorter
- Deaths: 1 (Ward)

On February 22, 2022, 32-year-old Richard Ward was fatally shot by Pueblo County deputy Charles McWhorter during an incident in Liberty Point International Middle School in Pueblo West, Colorado, United States.

Ward was questioned by the police after being observed attempting to enter a car that was not his in the middle school's parking lot. He was asked for his identification and if he had any weapons on his person. After admitting that he may be armed with a pocket knife, he appeared to put something in his mouth. McWhorter, one of two deputies at the scene, forcefully removed Ward out of the car and placed him on the ground, shortly before shooting him three times in the chest.

After reviewing the results, District Attorney Jeff Chostner determined that the deputies' actions were "rational and justified" because they "believed their lives or the lives of others were in jeopardy". McWhorter earned a Purple Heart award from the Pueblo County Sheriff's Office for allegedly sustaining injuries during the incident. On February 21, 2023, Ward's family filed a federal lawsuit against McWhorter and his agency.

== Killing ==
According to the report by the district attorney Critical Incident Team (CIT), Richard Ward arrived with his mother Kristy Ward and her boyfriend Tommy Brown to the school, to pick up his brother from middle school. Richard went for a smoke in the lot and was seen trying to get into a vehicle that was not his. He was confronted by school staff and was told to leave the premises. Tommy yelled at him to come back to the car.

According to the report by the district attorney CIT, deputies were dispatched on a report that a "suspicious" individual was in the middle school's parking lot, trying to get into cars, became "aggressive" and was possibly "on something". The deputies arrived at the scene shortly after that and approached the suspect sitting in the rear passenger seat of a white SUV. Richard identified himself and gave the deputies his version of events, saying that he had confused the vehicle for his mother's white SUV and apologized to the driver.

The tone of the conversation shifted dramatically after Ward was asked for his identification and if he had any weapons on his person. After admitting to possibly being armed with a knife, Ward appeared to put a pill into his mouth, which was followed by McWhorter, one of two deputies at the scene, pulling Ward out of the car. A brief physical altercation ensued culminating with McWhorter discharging his service weapon three times, fatally wounding Ward.

=== Body camera footage ===
The bodycam footage of the incident was released by the family's attorney. Ward can be seen in the footage sitting in the rear seat of a white SUV, telling officers that he had mistakenly tried to enter another vehicle. The body camera footage shows Ward saying he was not comfortable around law enforcement officers since excessive force had previously been used against him.

Ward is seen explaining to the officer what happened when he entered the wrong car. He emptied his pockets when Charles McWhorter, the Pueblo County sheriff deputy, demanded his identification. Ward also said he might have a pocketknife. Then he pulled a pill out of his pocket and placed it in his mouth, after which the tone of the conversation shifted dramatically. "What did you just stick in your mouth?" McWhorter asked Ward. McWhorter then forcibly removes Ward from the car and takes him to the ground beside the passenger's rear door of the suspect's vehicle. Ward then responded, "it was a pill." McWhorter and another officer, Cassandra Gonzales, struggle with Ward on the ground, after which three gunshots can be heard in the footage. Richard's mother is heard to ask "Is my son shot?" and was ordered to stay in her seat by the officers. McWhorter and his partner confirmed with each other that they were both fine. McWhorter told Gonzales that Ward had headbutted him in the nose and "tried to grab my stuff". Ward was later declared dead at the site.

== Aftermath ==
McWhorter, the deputy who fatally shot Richard Ward three times in the chest, subsequently stated that he thought Ward was reaching for his gun. According to the report by the district attorney CIT, it was revealed that Richard possessed no weapon and autopsy found a prescription anti-anxiety pill in his pocket. In October 2022, Colorado's 10th Judicial District Attorney J.E. Chostner, eventually ruled that McWhorter's shooting of Ward was justified.

Ward's mother, Kristy Ward Stamp, said the loss had "broken" her heart. Ward's mother and the defense attorney for his family showed their disgust at how the Pueblo sheriff's office handled Richard Ward's killing. "This was nothing short of state-sanctioned murder of a citizen who should not have been arrested, let alone killed in broad daylight," said the Ward family's attorney, Darold Killmer, in a statement according to the Washington Post.

=== Award to the deputy ===
On February 17, 2023, Charles McWhorter was awarded a purple heart by the Pueblo County Sheriff's Office for sustaining injuries to his forehead, fingers, back, knee, and neck while attempting to subdue suspect Richard Ward. Ward was fatally wounded in the incident. The award came four days before Ward's family filed a federal wrongful death case. The family attorney stated that Ward's family were not aware of the award when they filed the complaint. Killmer added that the award was "truly a brazen act which mocks the very purpose of a Purple Heart".

=== Lawsuit ===
Ward's family opened "a federal civil rights lawsuit alleging improper use of force" on February 21, 2023. The complaint also challenges the arrest of Ward's mother and her boyfriend, seizure of their property and their subsequent interrogation. On January 11, 2024, a federal judge declined to dismiss the lawsuit, stating that the repeated attempts of the county to dismiss the case were "improper".

== See also ==
- List of school shootings in the United States by death toll
- Killing of Tyre Nichols
