= Zilli =

Zilli may refer to:

- Bar Zilli, building in central Asmara, Eritrea
- Zilli (surname), surname

== See also ==
- Celje, Slovenia
