= Star of Texas (award) =

Award from the state of Texas

The Star of Texas Awards is a prestigious American law enforcement medal and award of the State of Texas that was designed to honor Texas peace officers (law enforcement officers), firefighters, emergency medical first responders, and federal law enforcement officers who have lost their lives or sustained serious injuries while performing their duties. The award also extends to private citizens who have been killed or seriously injured while aiding a Texas peace officer, firefighter, or emergency medical first responder in the line of duty. The award is typically handed out by the Governor of Texas in Austin, Texas on September 11 each year.

The Star of Texas Awards were established in 2003, and have been presented to more than 712 killed or injured Texas First Responders.

== Qualifications ==
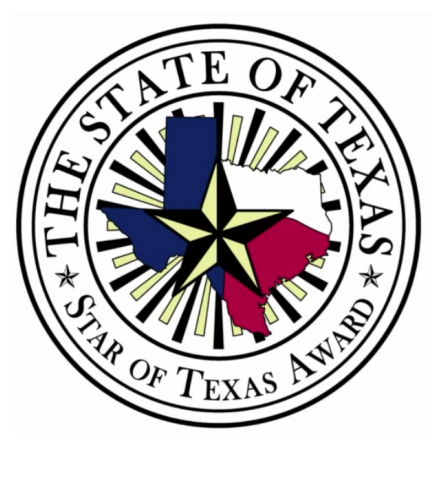
Star of Texas Award Logo

According to the State of Texas, eligibility for consideration for the Star of Texas Awards is contingent upon the critical incident occurring between September 1, 2003, and June 13 of the same year the awards ceremony takes place. An individual is eligible to receive multiple Star of Texas Awards, provided that each award is in recognition of a different incident.

Every year, the Governor appoints an advisory committee for each of the three first responder categories: Law Enforcement, Firefighter, and Emergency Medical. These committees are responsible for evaluating award nominations to ensure they adhere to the statutory criteria established for the awards. The careful scrutiny by these committees guarantees that only those who meet the high standards of the award are considered for recognition.

== License Plate ==
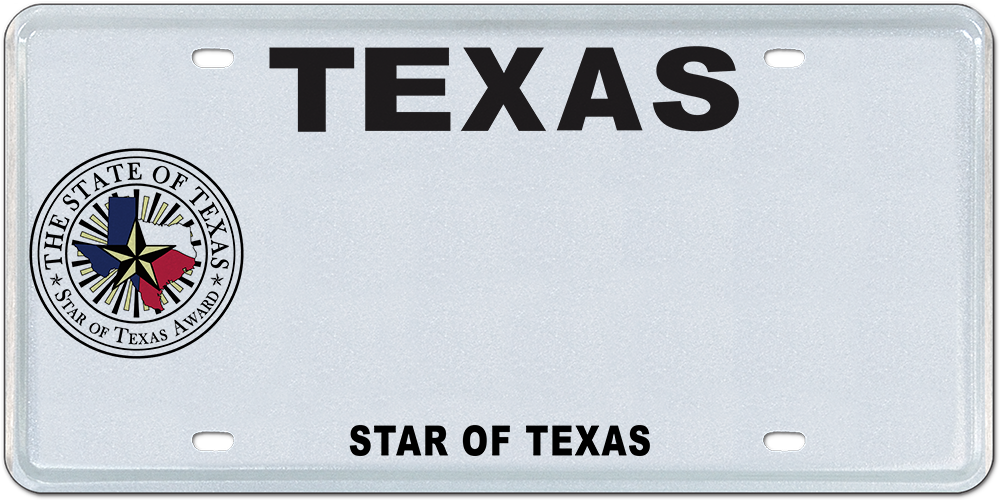
Star of Texas License Plate

Awardee's are also granted the option of purchasing a Star of Texas Award Specialty License Plate. The license plate reads "STAR OF TEXAS" on the center bottom of the plate and has the Star of Texas Award on the left side of the License Plate.

== Notable Honorees ==
- 2023: Sr. Cpl. Scott Jay - Dallas Police Department
- 2023: Ofc. Matthew Zalewski - Seagraves Police Department
- 2022: Ofc. Jon Riordan - Austin Police Department
- 2022: Cpl. Alejandro Munoz - Odessa Police Department
- 2015: Sgt. Houston Lee Gass - Pampa Police Department
- 2014: Ofc. Ann Marie Carrizales - Stafford Police Department

2016 Dallas Police Shootings:

- DPD Senior Cpl. Lorne Ahrens
- DPD Officer Michael Krol
- DPD Sgt. Michael Smith
- DPD Officer Brent Thompson
- DPD Officer Patricio "Patrick" Zamarripa
