= Law Enforcement Purple Heart =

A Law Enforcement Purple Heart or Police Purple Heart is a term to describe an American law enforcement medal which may be issued to any law enforcement officer who is injured, wounded or killed in the line of duty. The term is based on the Purple Heart medal issued by the United States Armed Forces. One of the major organizations for the Purple Heart for Law Enforcement is the National Associations of Chiefs of Police who award the Law Enforcement Purple Heart.

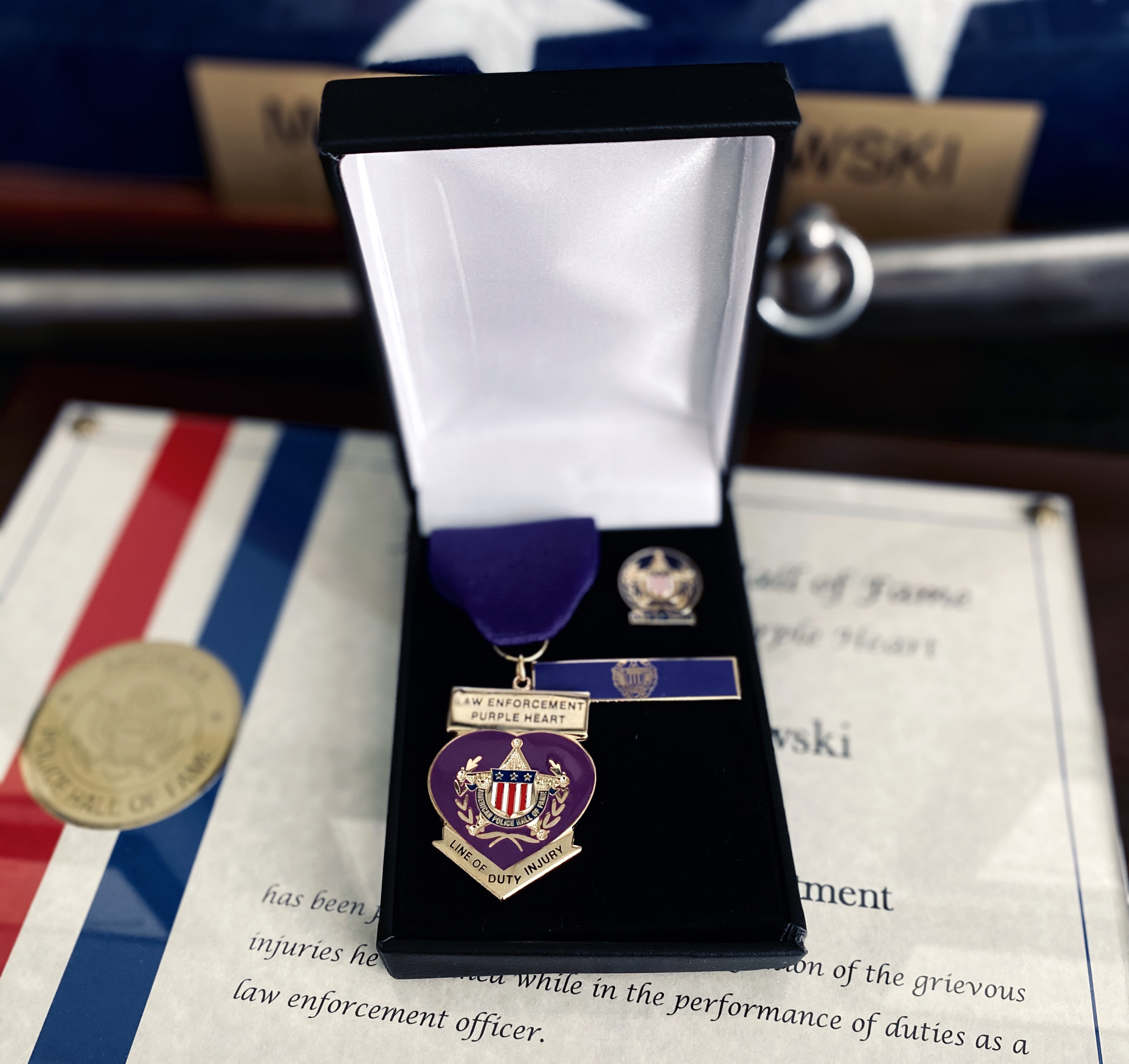
A Law Enforcement Purple Heart and Certificate issued by the National Association of Chiefs of Police

As the Police Purple Heart is issued by several different local police agencies, exact criteria for issuance vary.

== Iowa ==
In the year 2013 after several incidents, the Iowa State Police Association (ISPA) proposed the idea of the Iowa Law Enforcement Purple Heart Medal. In July 2013, the ISPA unanimously voted for the adoption of the award. The award was for those sworn Iowa law enforcement officers who have been seriously wounded or killed in the line of duty as a result of a combat incident. Their criteria were for those seriously, critically or fatally injured in the performance of law enforcement duty. They also stated that this award may be awarded for an injury that was averted by the wearing of body armor.

== Texas ==
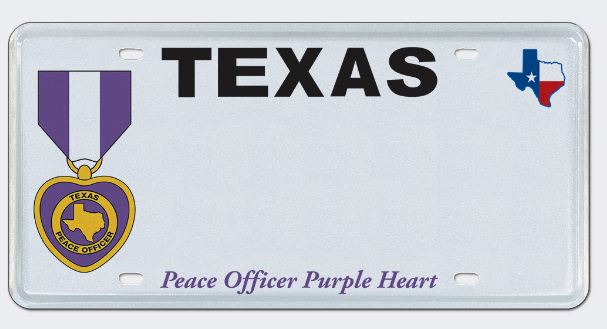
A blank Texas Peace Officer Purple Heart License Plate

The State of Texas has the Star of Texas Award. This award is given to peace officers, firefighters, and emergency first responders who are killed or suffer serious injury in the line of duty. It is also given to the family members of those mentioned. This award is given every September in a ceremony.

Texas also awards The Peace Office Purple Heart specialty license plate in honor of those who have earned a Peace Officer Purple Heart. Texas is the only state who has a license plate like this. This license plate has the words "Peace Officer Purple Heart" and an image of a purple heart with the State of Texas in the middle that says "Texas Peace Officer".
