= Medals of the New York City Police Department =

The New York City Police Department presents medals to its members for meritorious service. The medals the NYPD awards are as follows (from highest precedence to lowest):

== Medal of Honor ==
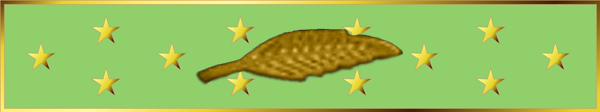

The Medal of Honor (solid green bar speckled tiny gold stars) is awarded for:

- Individual acts of extraordinary bravery intelligently performed in the line of duty at imminent and personal danger to life. Specifically, the Department Medal of Honor is awarded for acts of gallantry and valor performed with knowledge of the risk involved, above and beyond the call of duty. A second award is denoted by a gold leaf. It is the highest honor in the New York City Police Department.

== Police Combat Cross ==
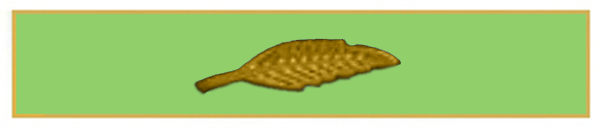

The Police Combat Cross (solid green bar) is awarded for:

- Members who have successfully and intelligently performed an act of extraordinary heroism, while engaged in personal combat with an armed adversary under circumstances of imminent personal hazard to life. A second award is denoted by a gold leaf.

== Medal for Valor ==
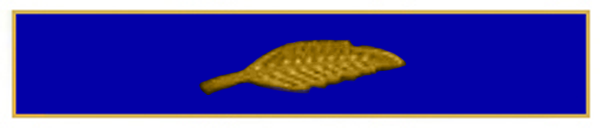

The Medal for Valor (solid blue bar) is awarded for:

- Acts of outstanding personal bravery intelligently performed in the line of duty at imminent personal hazard to life under circumstances evincing a disregard of personal consequences. A second award is denoted by a gold leaf.

== Meritorious Police Duty (MPD) ==
=== Honorable Mention ===

The Honorable Mention (displayed wearing the MPD medal with a silver star in the middle) is awarded for:

- An act of extraordinary bravery intelligently performed in the line of duty at imminent and personal danger to life.

=== Exceptional Merit ===

The Exceptional Merit (displayed wearing the MPD medal with a green star in the middle) is awarded for:

- An act of bravery intelligently performed involving personal risk to life.

=== Commendation or Commendation—Integrity ===

The Commendation or Commendation—Integrity (displayed wearing the MPD medal with a bronze star in the middle) is awarded for:

- Grave personal danger in the performance of duty, OR
- A highly creditable, unusual police accomplishment.

=== Commendation—Community Service ===

The Commendation—Community Service (displayed wearing the MPD medal with a blue star in the middle) is awarded for:

- An act which demonstrates devotion to Community service.
- An idea implemented that improves conditions within a Community.

=== Meritorious Police Duty ===

The Meritorious Police Duty (MPD medal with no star in the middle) is awarded for:

- An act of intelligent and valuable police service demonstrating special faithfulness or perseverance, OR
- Highly creditable acts of police service over a period of time.

== Excellent Police Duty (EPD) ==

The Excellent Police Duty (green and white bar with gold vertical bars) is awarded for:

- An intelligent act materially contributing to a valuable accomplishment, OR
- Submission of a device or method adopted to increase efficiency in an administrative or tactical procedure.

== Unit Citation ==
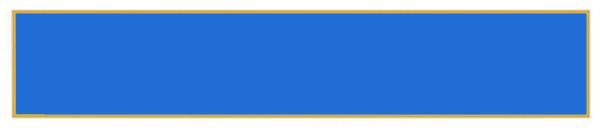

The Unit Citation (medium blue bar) is awarded to a specific unit or precinct for outstanding accomplishments.

== Purple Shield ==

The department awards a Purple Shield to those seriously physically injured or killed in the line of duty.

== Distinguished Service Medal ==
The department awards the Distinguished Service Medal posthumously to members of the service who suffer death as a result of illnesses associated with duty performed under unusual hazard or demand. It was first awarded in 2008.

== Other awards or decorations ==
Various commemorative medals, unit citations, air crew wings, and others have also been authorized for wear.

=== American Flag Breast Bar ===

- May be worn by any NYPD officer. It is affixed above any other medal.

=== World Trade Center Breast Bar ===

- Once reserved to any NYPD officer who was in active service during, or worked details related to the follow up on, the September 11 attacks, it has been updated to allow any NYPD Police Officer, at their discretion, to wear the bar in honor and remembrance. It is affixed just below the American Flag Breast Bar and above any other medal.

=== Firearms Proficiency Bar ===
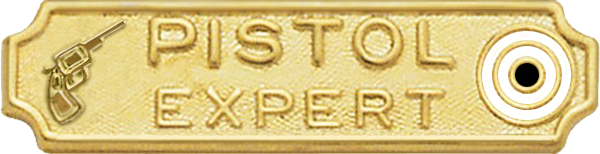

- May be worn by any NYPD officer who has been certified or recertified as an expert shooter with their police firearm. It is affixed just above the shield and below any other medal.
