= Law & Order: Criminal Intent season 10 =

Season of American television series

Law & Order: Criminal Intent
- Season 10
- Season 10 U.S. DVD cover
- No. of episodes: 8

Release
- Original network: USA Network
- Original release: May 1 – June 26, 2011

Season chronology
- ← Previous; Season 9

The tenth and final season of Law & Order: Criminal Intent premiered Sunday, May 1, 2011, on USA Network. The timeslot was moved to Sunday nights at 9 p.m. (ET) from Tuesday nights at 10:00 pm Eastern/9:00 pm Central.

This marks the first and only season since the show's debut that did not air with the original Law & Order still on the air, due to the latter's cancellation by NBC in May 2010. Episodes from this season repeated on NBC on Mondays starting May 30, 2011, at 9 p.m. (ET), leading into new episodes of Law & Order: LA, which was placed on hiatus from January to early April 2011, causing its own new episodes to air through July 2011.

Law & Order: Criminal Intent finished its 10 season run on June 26, 2011. It was confirmed by USA Network co-president Jeff Wachtel on July 15, 2011; when asked about a possible 11th season, Wachtel answered "No—and this is said with respect for the show, respect for Dick [Wolf], and most significantly with respect to the audience." Wachtel also cited reasons for not renewing being monetary issues. The episodes in the tenth season averaged 4.43 million total viewers and 1.67 million in the age 18-49 demographic; higher than the numbers the show pulled in the ninth season.

== Season overview ==
Season ten returns to the single pairing of Detectives Robert Goren (Vincent D'Onofrio) and Alexandra Eames (Kathryn Erbe) at the Major Case Squad. Terminated for insubordination a year ago, Detective Goren has been reunited with his long-time partner Alex Eames at the behest of the new Major Case Captain (Jay O. Sanders).

This final eight episode arc focussed on Goren's tortured past and charting a course for a successful future. Storylines for this season included a beautiful female banker whose sole client was the Catholic Church; an adventuresome rogue who may be the country's best cyber-warrior; and a woman who was blackmailing a wealthy, tabloid-fodder "bad boy." The episode "Icarus" explored a scenario inspired by many of the cast incidents in the Broadway play Spider-Man: Turn Off the Dark; in this case, they turn tragic. This version features characters ranging from a high-strung director to a secretly bisexual rock-star composer.

In addition to solving cases, Goren has mandatory counselling sessions with astute police psychologist Dr. Paula Gyson (Julia Ormond) in which Goren is forced to confront his trust and anger issues. The series ends with Goren and Eames sharing an understanding of the strong bond in their professional relationship.

== Cast ==
=== Changes and returning characters ===
In August 2010, Jeff Goldblum (Detective Zack Nichols) announced his departure from the series after switching agencies and being unsure of the series' future. The options for renewal of Goldblum, Saffron Burrows, and Mary Elizabeth Mastrantonio's contracts formally expired on July 31, 2010, after being extended by a month on June 30 when they were originally up. The series at the time was in limbo. Over a month later, it was confirmed that Criminal Intent was returning for a tenth and final season consisting of eight episodes, with star Vincent D'Onofrio who portrays Detective Robert Goren. The news of Law & Order: CI getting a proper closure was in stark contrast with the abrupt cancellation of the original mothership series by NBC in May 2010.

Weeks later, it was announced that Kathryn Erbe would be returning as her character Detective Alex Eames, also confirming that ninth season cast member Saffron Burrows (Detective Serena Stevens) had departed. This meant a return to the single, original pair of Detectives Eames and Goren that featured in the first four seasons of the series.

In February 2011, Jay O. Sanders joined the cast as Captain Joseph Hannah, replacing Mary Elizabeth Mastrantonio (Captain Zoe Callas). Sanders has appeared in episodes of both the original Law & Order and L&O: Criminal Intent (in the second season episode Dead).

Chris Brancato replaced Walon Green as showrunner/executive producer. Green was showrunner/EP throughout seasons 8 and 9. Former showrunner/executive producer Warren Leight wrote the episode "Trophy Wine", along with all the scenes with D'Onofrio and Julia Ormond, and the final scenes in the finale, "To the Boy in the Blue Knit Cap". Co-creator, developer, and former showrunner/EP René Balcer re-wrote the finale as well, but went uncredited. Brancato suggested that the show could be picked up for an 11th season if the intended final episodes garner sufficient ratings.

Returning star Vincent D'Onofrio felt; "The fact that we had so many viewers, more than other cable shows, it's odd to see the show end." Although the show suffered a sharp ratings decline in the ninth season; coinciding with D'Onofrio and Erbe being written out of the show. Kathryn Erbe said to TV Guide if Law & Order: CI was possibly renewed; "I know that I would be there in a heartbeat. I'm fairly positive that Vincent [D'Onofrio] feels the same way. Everyone was really hoping that, in the 11th hour, we'd get some word. Whether the fans are able to muscle us back or not, who knows. They have amazing power."

=== Main cast ===
- Vincent D'Onofrio as Detective Robert Goren
- Kathryn Erbe as Detective Alexandra Eames
- Jay O. Sanders as Captain Joseph Hannah

=== Recurring cast ===
- Hudson Cooper as Detective Jefferies
- Traci Godfrey as Detective Agnes Farley
- Leslie Hendrix as Chief Medical Examiner Elizabeth Rodgers
- Jeff Hiller as Stan (MCS Technician)
- Julia Ormond as Dr. Paula Gyson
- Caris Vujcec as Detective Louise Campesi

=== Guest stars ===
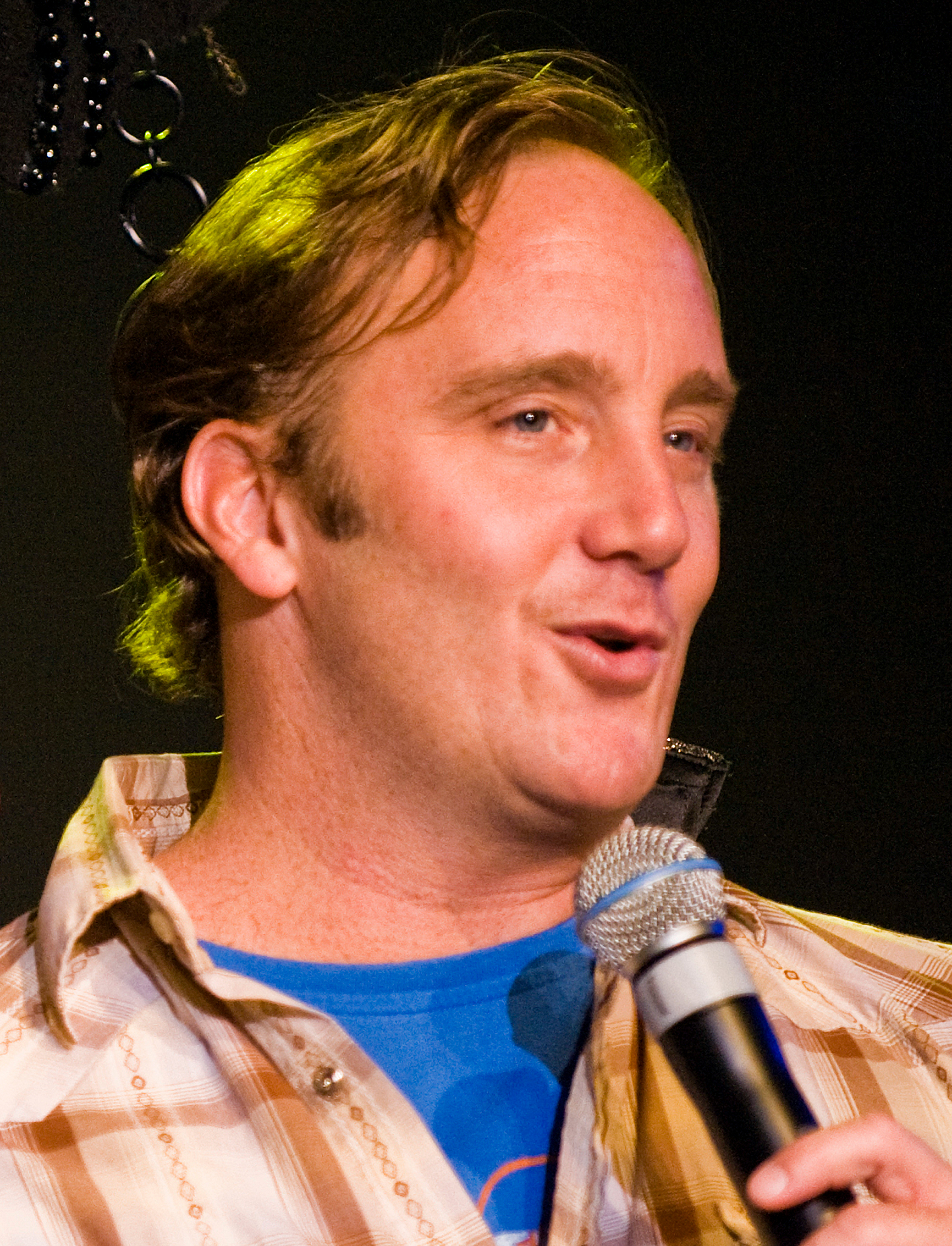
Jay Mohr

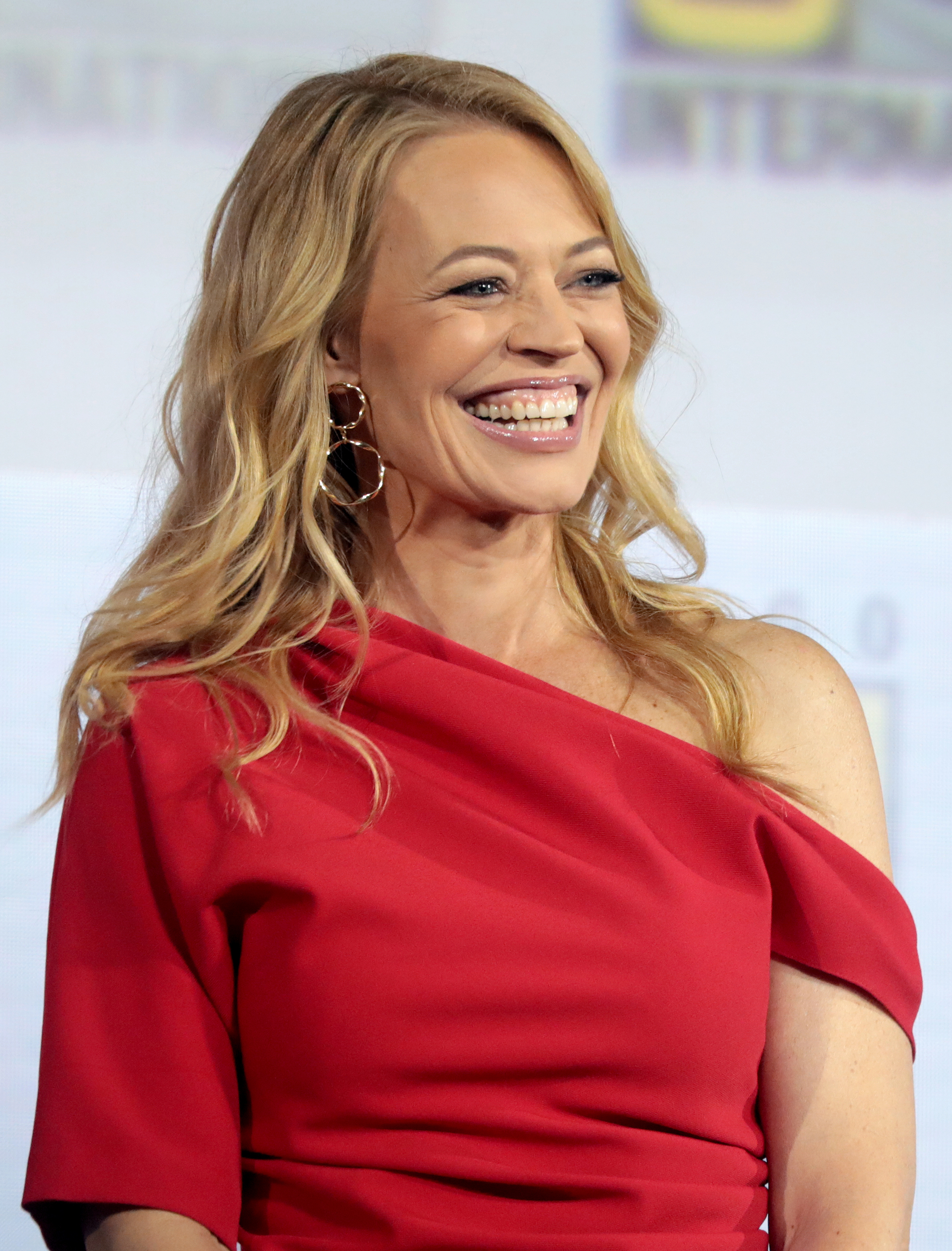
Jeri Ryan

Appearing in the season premier episode "Rispetto," Jay Mohr guest-stars as Nyle Brite, a famous, successful Charlie Sheen-type bad boy "rock star" fashion designer whose every creation turns to gold. His reputation for cocaine benders and call girl-populated parties only skyrockets his career and mints him as the "lovable rogue," until a body turns up. Noelle Beck plays Debra, Nyle’s long-suffering wife who has managed to withstand two decades of abuse because she has secrets of her own. Spencer Garrett plays Paul Keller, CEO of Nyle's company who has little patience for his drug-fueled antics. Neal Huff plays Jay's long-time friend Teddy Scola, a procurer of prostitutes and party favorites who is more than he seems.

In "The Consoler," Neal McDonough plays Monsignor McTeal who does great works for the Catholic Church such as soup kitchens, orphanages, cancer wards, and the like, but he also has a scandalous secret. Theresa Esperna (Elia Monte-Brown) helps resolve settlements for the Church, so when she dies by gunshot there are questions; suicide or murder. Jon Prescott plays Johnny Apreda, one of Theresa's colleagues, and Lauren Hodges plays Theresa's best friend Natalie Finnegan. Mark Dobies plays McTeal's attorney after being accused of Theresa's murder.

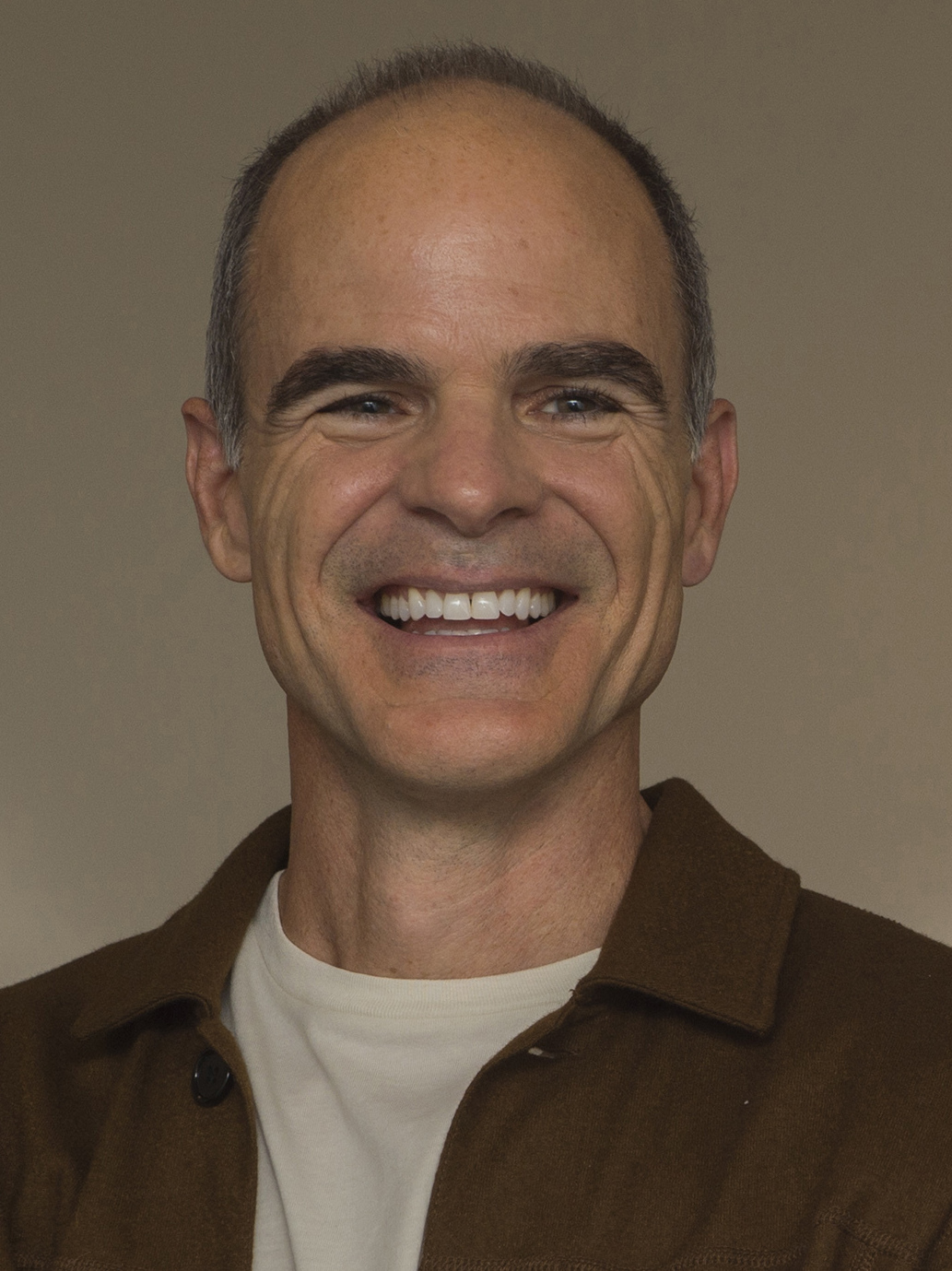
Michael Kelly

Michael Kelly guest stars as Terrence Brooks, head of Ascalon Security, who prefers "Boots on the Ground" to wars in cyberspace. He goes head-to-head with his rival, Naomi Halloran, portrayed by special guest star Jeri Ryan, a former CIA official who runs Sun Tech, a cyber-security company worth hundreds of millions. This no-nonsense businesswoman is harboring a secret. Aaron Mathias black hat's both sides as Matt Clark and Ian Masefield, but someone who can climb buildings throws him off a roof. Tala Ashe plays Matt's girlfriend, a practitioner and teacher of krav maga, who has her own secrets to harbor. Michele Pawk portrays Elise Clark, Matt's mother, who has been hiding her revolutionary secrets longer than any of them. Nicole Wallace (Olivia d'Abo), Goren's late nemesis, appears in a flashback.

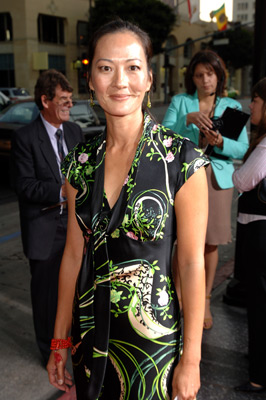
Rosalind Chao

In "The Last Street in Manhattan," Alexandra Silber guest stars as Vanessa Colway, the Inwood daughter of bar-owner/bookie Shawn Colway (Jack McGee). Vanessa is the latest and last girlfriend of David Kellen (David Alan Basche), a high-powered "Merger King" investment banker. Julie White plays Stephanie Miller who runs The Swan Club, a premiere match broker that fetches $700,000 per marriage. America Olivo plays Nikki Vansen, David's previous girlfriend who he dumped. Stephanie sets David up on a new date with Andrea Stiles (Beatrice Rosen), but his heart is not in it, and soon afterwards receives two 38-caliber slugs. Eric Sheffer Stevens plays Aston Skinner, David's #2, who is the first suspect. A second-best suspect is local thug, Jack Driscoll (Nick Chinlund). Ambition, greed, jealousy, revenge, and insider trading are all possible motives. Raymond J. Barry appears as Alexandra's father Johnny Eames, who still lives in her childhood Inwood home. Goren's birth father, Mark Ford Brady (Roy Scheider), also appears in a flashback.

Andrea Roth guest starred in "Trophy Wine" as Avery Cullman, an ad executive and wife of a rare wine dealer, Bing Cullman (AKA Arnold Binder), played by Michael Cumpsty. After a tasting party, Bing is found locked in his wine cellar, dead from a heart attack. Adrian Pasdar played a wine collector named Mason Kent and Bryan Batt portrayed premiere wine sommelier Hutton "The Nose" Mays. Scott Evans plays a male model Shane Berlin. Goren's brother Frank (Tony Goldwyn) appears in a flashback.

Rosalind Chao and Camille Chen guest star together as "tiger mother" Mrs. Zhuang and her daughter, Dr. Maya Zhuang. A "Cadaver" is found in a park dressed in clothing belonging to Ben Langston (Steven Weber), a wealthy philanthropist and Bedford Institute donor. Charlie Barnett plays Dr. Sam Harris, a son that Ben did not know he had. Jenna Stern plays Ben's wife Lauren. Geoffrey Cantor plays Ethan Lowe, the director of the funeral home where Ben's actual body was cremated.

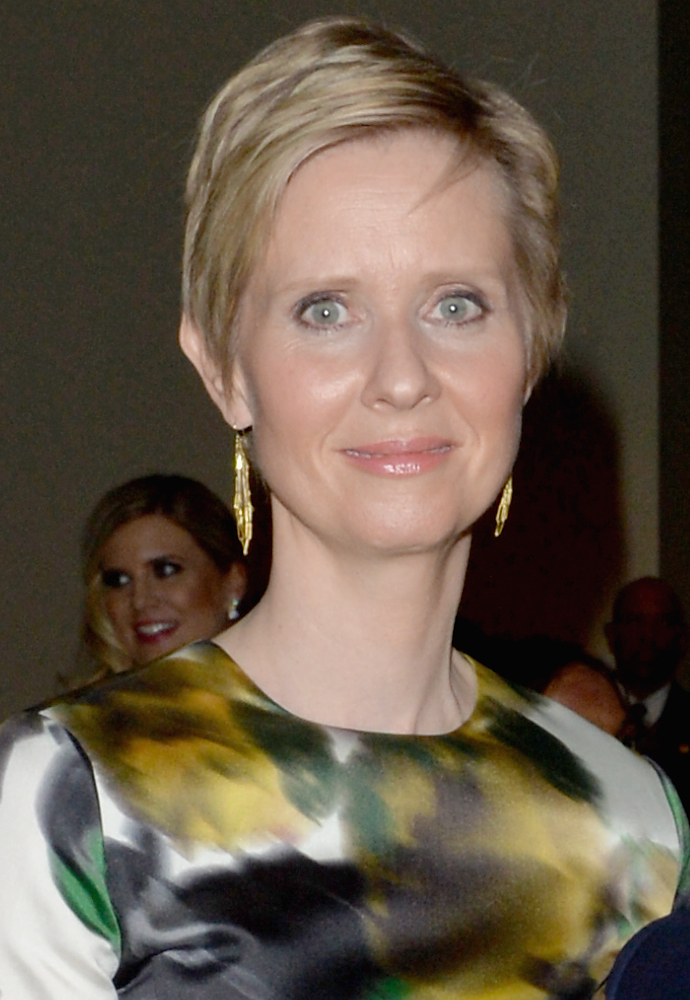
Cynthia Nixon

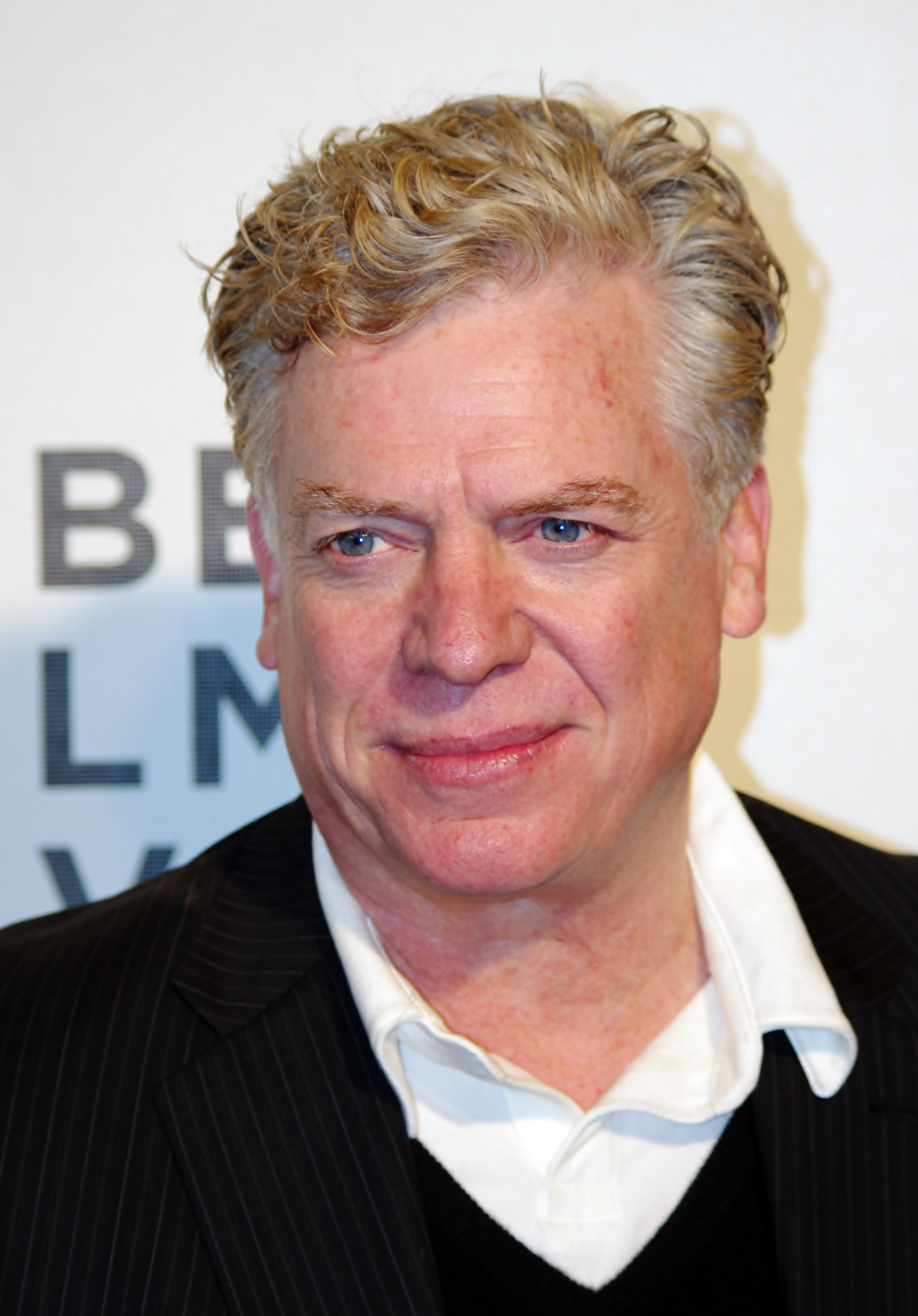
Christopher McDonald

Cynthia Nixon plays a high-strung director named Amanda Rollins (no relation to the character from Law & Order: SVU). An accident-plagued Broadway adaptation of Icarus results in the death of an actor on stage, sending Amanda spiraling out of control. Christopher McDonald guest stars as Evan Korman, the show's producer who clashes with Amanda. Michael Panes plays Roger Porter, Amanda's dramaturge. Eion Bailey portrays a "rock star" composer, Adam Winter, who is married-with-secrets. Billy Magnussen is sitcom star Marc Landry, the bumbling lead character Icarus, who flies to close to sun before he crashes down to his death. Matt Cavenaugh plays Brice Calder, Marc's understudy. Ken Dashow, a New York City classic rock disc jockey for WAXQ radio station, makes an appearance as theater critic Michael DeWitt. Rock & Roll Hall of Fame inductee and award-winning author Patti Smith plays an old friend of Goren; mythology professor Cleo Alexander at Columbia University, who helps Goren figure out the meaning behind "Icarus" (a metaphor for failed ambition). Regarding D'Onofrio, Smith said, "He's been taught by the greatest, and he taught me, so I feel like if I had to do it again, I'd be really good," she says. "He's such a great actor, such a great director and becoming such a good friend."

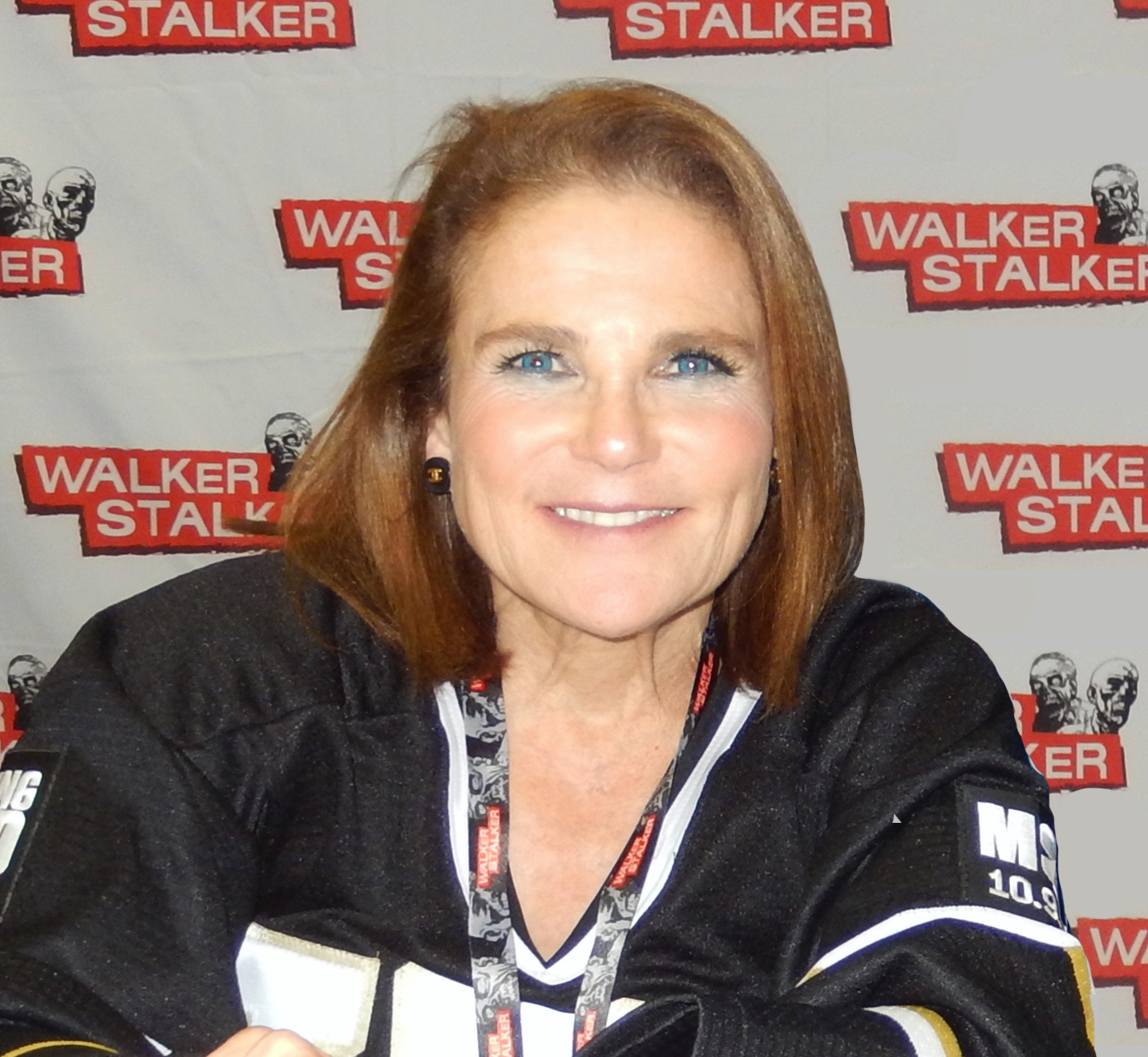
Tovah Feldshuh

Natalie Gold plays Danielle Magee, an idealistic coder behind the KizMate dating sight dedicated "To the Boy in the Blue Knit Cap", her boyfriend PJ Edwards (Pawel Szajda), who is now also a member of the board. James Van Der Beek plays Rex Tamlyn, a business strategist, who is a hard-partying playboy and partner in their Facebook-esque website devoted to "connecting people who share fleeting romantic encounters." Ripped-from-the-headlines, the episode involves a lawsuit for IP theft. Thad Luckinbill and his identical twin Trent portray "Winklevoss-ian" venture capitalists, Parker & Thomas Gaffney, who are the plaintiffs in the lawsuit. Richard Bekins plays their father, and Manish Dayal plays Samir Doss, their business partner, who tries to find a compromise that satisfies all parties. NFL Running Back Brandon Jacobs also make a special guest appearance as a bouncer. Tovah Feldshuh reprises her role of defense attorney Danielle Melnick from Law & Order, and Isiah Whitlock Jr. appears as the first-on-scene detective.

== Episodes ==
No. overall	No. in season	Title	Directed by	Written by	USA air date	NBC air date	Prod. code	U.S. viewers (millions)
188	1	"Rispetto"	Jean de Segonzac	Rick Eid	May 1, 2011	May 30, 2011	10004	5.10
After a young call girl Sarah Bell (Alice Callahan) is murdered, the investigation leads Detectives Goren and Eames behind the scenes of the fashion industry, with the resident star designer and hard-partying, "rockstar" Nyle Brite (Jay Mohr) who is about to launch an Initial public offering to institutional investors. When Brite is shot dead after a disastrous TV interview which sinks the IPO, the detectives look at who stood most to lose: his finance backer, Paul Keller (Spencer Garrett), his long-suffering wife Debra (Noelle Beck) who is having an affair with his psychiatrist Dr. Samantha Harper (Regina Schneider) and his long-time friend and designer Teddy Scola (Neal Huff) who was perpetually under Brite's shadow. The detectives eventually uncover that Bell was Bright's daughter who was seeking to blackmail him and that Scola murdered them both because they had sabotaged the IPO which would have given him the financial stake to launch his own fashion line.: Inspired by the substance abuse and legal issues of Charlie Sheen.
189	2	"The Consoler"	Michael Smith	Chris Brancato	May 8, 2011	June 6, 2011	10001	3.68
Detectives Goren and Eames investigate the apparent suicide of the devout Theresa Esperna (Elia Monte-Brown), an employee at the Salerno Bank who was processing the settlement accounts of the Catholic Church's abused victims. The detectives initially suspect her killer as Monsignor McTeal (Neal McDonough) with whom she had a sexual relationship which caused her immense personal conflict. Although the Monsignor does good works for the Church, consoling abused women, starting soup kitchens, orphanages and cancer wards he regularly breached his vow of chastity. Further investigation reveals that Esperna apparently redirected a $2.7mil payout meant for Alice Garvey (Mary B. McCann) to a secret trust however it was in fact her co-worker Johnny Apreda (Jon Prescott). He stole the money because he had been molested by a priest as a child and only received a meagre payout and killed Esperna to cover up his theft. This is the first episode in which Goren starts compulsory therapy sessions with Dr. Paula Gyson (Julia Ormond).
190	3	"Boots on the Ground"	Jean de Segonzac	S : Paul Eckstein; S/T : Marlane Gomard Meyer	May 15, 2011	June 20, 2011	10002	3.83
Goren and Eames investigate the death of a brilliant hacker (Aaron Mathias) who is thrown to his death off a building. They uncover that he was a black hat hacker using two aliases, Matt Clark and Ian Masefield and had been working for two competing private security companies: Sun Tech run by Naomi Halloran (Jeri Ryan), and Ascalon Security run by Terrence Brooks (Michael Kelly). They also find that Matt's mother, Elise Clark (Michele Pawk) had been a member of the radical anti-capitalist "People's Liberation Brigade" and her son Matt and his friend Rebecca Landon (Tala Ashe), ex-Israeli army and a practitioner and teacher of krav maga, had similar goals - to leak confidential information to the press. Eventually, Elise Clark reveals that Matt and Naomi were having an affair and that Terrence knew Matt was stealing information. This enables Goren and Eames to prove that Terrence convinced Naomi to entice Matt to the roof where Rebecca threw him to his death on the threat that Terrence would kill her family in Israel if she refused.: Inspired in part by the 2010 WikiLeaks scandal.
191	4	"The Last Street in Manhattan"	Jean de Segonzac	Rick Eid	May 22, 2011	June 27, 2011	10006	3.33
The shooting murder of a Wall Street investment bank CEO David Kellen (David Alan Basche) takes Detectives Goren and Eames on an investigative trail that leads into the world of high finance, mergers and acquisitions. It appears Kellen and his colleague Aston Skinner (Eric Sheffer Stevens) were in the habit of using a premiere match broker Stephanie Miller (Julie White) who runs The Swan Club to find high class women for them. They interview Kellen's date, Andrea Stiles (Beatrice Rosen), and his former girlfriend, Nikki Vansen (America Olivo), but find that Kellen loved Vanessa Colway (Alexandra Silber), a working class woman from the last residential street on Manhattan Island, 218th in Inwood. They uncover that Vanessa's father Shawn (Jack McGee) owed local thug, Jack Driscoll (Nick Chinlund), a large sum of money and she gave Driscoll inside information from Kellen on an upcoming merger to repay the debt. When Kellen found what Driscoll had done, he threatened to expose Driscoll who then murdered him. To persuade Vanessa to help them convict Driscoll, Goren and Eames pretend that he killed her father.
192	5	"Trophy Wine"	Michael Smith	Warren Leight	June 5, 2011	July 11, 2011	10003	3.91
Wealthy wine importer Bing Cullman (AKA Arnold Binder) (Michael Cumpsty) is found dead of a heart attack after being locked in his wine cellar. Detectives Goren and Eames are informed that he was killed by a drug cocktail and begin to investigate his rare wine dealing activities including that was selling counterfeit product. Suspects include the butler Loy (Juan Luis Acevedo), wealthy wine collector Mason Kent (Adrian Pasdar), premiere sommelier Hutton "The Nose" Mays (Bryan Batt), wine auctioneer Ev Dilahunt (Munson Hicks), Bing’s wife Avery (Andrea Roth), her new boyfriend, male model Shane Berlin (Scott Evans) and budding actress and part-time escort, Emily (Kay Copeland). The detectives uncover that Cullman had planned to divorce Avery before their 10th anniversary so she would receive none of his estate and hired Shane to romance her to provide grounds for the divorce. However Avery found out about the impending divorce and engineered his heart attack.
193	6	"Cadaver"	Frank Prinzi	Julie Martin	June 12, 2011	July 18, 2011	10005	3.59
Pharmaceutical philanthropist Ben Langston (Steven Weber) disappears after announcing funding for a research grant and later a medical cadaver from the institute is found dressed in his clothes. Detectives Goren and Eames are called in and they find Langston's that body was switched and cremated. They investigate contenders for the grant: the recipient Maya Zhuang (Camille Chen), disgruntled losers Theo Kendall (Clayton Apgar) who is having an affair with Langston’s wife Lauren (Jenna Stern) and Sam Harris (Charlie Barnett) a son that Langston did not know he had until the award night. As the investigation progresses, Goren and Eames uncover that Maya's "tiger mother" Mrs. Zhuang (Rosalind Chao) feared that Langston would withdraw Maya's funding and give it to Sam Harris. She killed Langston in a fit of rage then pressuered Maya into helping her dispose of the body. Meanwhile Goren's therapy sessions with Dr. Paula Gyson are not going well.: Inspired in part by the "tiger mother" controversy.
194	7	"Icarus"	Frank Prinzi	Julie Martin	June 19, 2011	August 1, 2011	10007	3.27
A blockbuster Broadway musical about the mythological Icarus is plagued by a series of minor accidents, but grabs another headline when the show's lead, sitcom star Marc Landry (Billy Magnussen), falls to his death during one of the play's highly choreographed stunts. When Goren and Eames rule out an accident, the façade of the tight knit theater family falls away to reveal the players for who they really are: understudy Brice Calder (Matt Cavenaugh) who resented being passed over for an untalented big name; former rock star Adam Winter (Eion Bailey) anxious that his songwriting doesn't pass muster; producer Evan Korman (Christopher McDonald) obsessed with upholding his family's Broadway legacy; visionary but highly strung director Amanda Rollins (Cynthia Nixon) who is coming apart at the seams; and Roger Porter (Michael Panes) Amanda's tireless assistant who was hired by Korman. Amid the lies, half-truths and deception, the detectives uncover that Korman pressured Porter to stage the "accident” so that the doomed play would be cancelled and he could claim on the insurance to pay off his investors.: Inspired by the controversial Broadway musical Spider-Man: Turn Off the Dark, as mentioned within the episode.
195	8	"To the Boy in the Blue Knit Cap"	Jean de Segonzac	Julie Martin & Chris Brancato	June 26, 2011	Unaired	10008	3.75
Detectives Goren and Eames investigate the murders of identical twin brother venture capitalists, Parker (Thad Luckinbill) and Thomas Gaffney (Trent Luckinbill) whose bodies are discovered in the office of KizMate, the web company they were suing for IP theft in a heated lawsuit. KizMate was formed by Danielle Magee (Natalie Gold) and her boyfriend PJ Edwards (Pawel Szajda) to connect strangers who have had brief romantic encounters. The detectives uncover a web of intrigue in which the Gaffney's business partner Samir Doss (Manish Dayal) and Danielle separately tried to work out a settlement while PJ and their drug addicted business partner Rex Tamlyn (James Van Der Beek) played hard ball with Parker Gaffney. The detectives uncover that when the twins went to the KizMate offices they fought and Parker accidentally killed Thomas who was having an affair with Danielle who killed Parker in a fit of rage with a pair of scissors. Meanwhile, Dr. Paula Gyson brings Goren to the realization that he needs to address his trust and anger issues.: Inspired in part by The Accidental Billionaires written by Ben Mezrich and its 2010 film adaptation, The Social Network, which tells the founding of Facebook, a social networking website that connects friends, the creator Mark Zuckerberg, and its controversial lawsuit.

Preceded by Season Nine	List of Law & Order: Criminal Intent episodes	End of series
