= List of Law & Order: Criminal Intent episodes =

Law & Order: Criminal Intent is an American police procedural television series set and filmed in New York City. It is the second spin-off of the long-running crime drama Law & Order. Law & Order: Criminal Intent follows a distinct division of the New York City Police Department: the Major Case Squad, which investigates high-profile murder cases, such as those involving VIPs, local government officials and employees, the financial industry, and the art world. Unlike the other series in the Law & Order franchise, Law & Order: Criminal Intent gives significant attention to the actions and motives of the criminals, rather than primarily focusing on the police investigation and trial prosecution. Episodes do not usually contain trials, and often end in confessions rather than plea bargains or verdicts.

Law & Order: Criminal Intent premiered on NBC on September 30, 2001. Following a ratings decline, the series moved to the USA Network after the end of its sixth season. CI continued with its seventh season on USA Network on October 4, 2007, and ended at its tenth season on June 26, 2011.

During its ten-season run on the two networks, 195 original episodes were broadcast.

== Series overview ==
Season	Episodes	Originally released			Rank	Viewers (in millions)
Season	Episodes	First released	Last released	Network	Rank	Viewers (in millions)
1	22	September 30, 2001	May 10, 2002	NBC	34	11.9
2	23	September 29, 2002	May 18, 2003	NBC	20	14.3
3	21	September 28, 2003	May 23, 2004	NBC	20	12.8
4	23	September 26, 2004	May 25, 2005	NBC	28	12.1
5	22	September 25, 2005	May 14, 2006	NBC	38	11.0
6	22	September 19, 2006	May 21, 2007	NBC	59	8.8
7	22	October 4, 2007	August 24, 2008	USA	91	7.46
8	16	April 19, 2009	August 9, 2009	USA	107	5.40
9	16	March 30, 2010	July 6, 2010	USA	—N/a	3.50
10	8	May 1, 2011	June 26, 2011	USA	—N/a	4.43

Law & Order: Criminal Intent is also available in various new media formats. The first six seasons of Law & Order: Criminal Intent have been released on DVD by NBC Universal subsidiary Universal Studios Home Entertainment in Region 1 with Shout Factory releasing season seven onwards. The first five seasons are also available on DVD in regions 2 and 4. Episodes from seasons one, and five through nine have been sold at the iTunes Store and Amazon Video on Demand.

== Episodes ==
=== Season 1 (2001–02) ===
No. overall	No. in season	Title	Directed by	Written by	Original release date	Prod. code	U.S. viewers (millions)
1	1	"One"	Jean de Segonzac	S : Dick Wolf; T : René Balcer	September 30, 2001	E2101	12.80
2	2	"Art"	David Platt	Elizabeth M. Cosin	October 7, 2001	E2110	11.27
3	3	"Smothered"	Michael Fields	Marlane Gomard Meyer	October 14, 2001	E2111	14.50
4	4	"The Faithful"	Constantine Makris	Stephanie Sengupta	October 17, 2001	E2104	19.32
5	5	"Jones"	Frank Prinzi	S : René Balcer; S/T : Geoffrey Neigher	October 21, 2001	E2114	13.06
6	6	"The Extra Man"	Jean de Segonzac	Marlane Gomard Meyer	October 28, 2001	E2106	12.62
7	7	"Poison"	Gloria Muzio	Stephanie Sengupta	November 11, 2001	E2108	11.77
8	8	"The Pardoner's Tale"	Steve Shill	Theresa Rebeck	November 18, 2001	E2112	12.83
9	9	"The Good Doctor"	Constantine Makris	Geoffrey Neigher	November 25, 2001	E2103	14.04
10	10	"Enemy Within"	John David Coles	David Black	December 9, 2001	E2107	10.81
11	11	"The Third Horseman"	Constantine Makris	René Balcer	January 6, 2002	E2115	12.29
12	12	"Crazy"	Steve Shill	René Balcer	January 13, 2002	E2102	13.31
13	13	"The Insider"	Jan Egleson	Elizabeth M. Cosin	January 27, 2002	E2105	12.97
14	14	"Homo Homini Lupis"	David Platt	René Balcer	March 3, 2002	E2113	11.61
15	15	"Semi-Professional"	Gloria Muzio	S : René Balcer; S/T : Stephanie Sengupta	March 10, 2002	E2118	8.64
16	16	"Phantom"	Juan J. Campanella	S : René Balcer; S/T : Marlane Gomard Meyer	March 17, 2002	E2116	11.93
17	17	"Seizure"	Michael Fields	S : René Balcer; S/T : Hall Powell	March 31, 2002	E2119	11.67
18	18	"Yesterday"	Jean de Segonzac	S : René Balcer; S/T : Theresa Rebeck	April 14, 2002	E2117	10.34
19	19	"Maledictus"	Frank Prinzi	S : René Balcer; S/T : Stephanie Sengupta	April 21, 2002	E2122	11.45
20	20	"Badge"	Constantine Makris	S : René Balcer; S/T : Marlane Gomard Meyer	April 28, 2002	E2124	13.44
21	21	"Faith"	Ed Sherin	S : René Balcer; S/T : Theresa Rebeck	April 28, 2002	E2121	15.34
22	22	"Tuxedo Hill"	Steve Shill	René Balcer	May 10, 2002	E2127	12.53

=== Season 2 (2002–03) ===
No. overall	No. in season	Title	Directed by	Written by	Original release date	Prod. code	U.S. viewers (millions)
23	1	"Dead"	Darnell Martin	S : René Balcer; S/T : Stephanie Sengupta	September 29, 2002	E3202	15.79
24	2	"Bright Boy"	Frank Prinzi	S : René Balcer; S/T : Marlane Gomard Meyer	October 6, 2002	E3205	14.78
25	3	"Anti-Thesis"	Adam Bernstein	S : René Balcer & Dick Wolf; S/T : Eric Overmyer	October 13, 2002	E3203	14.61
26	4	"Best Defense"	Gloria Muzio	S : René Balcer; S/T : Elizabeth M. Cosin	October 20, 2002	E3201	14.73
27	5	"Chinoiserie"	David Platt	S : René Balcer; S/T : B. Mason	October 27, 2002	E3206	14.15
28	6	"Malignant"	Frank Prinzi & Juan J. Campanella	S : René Balcer; S/T : Michael S. Chernuchin	November 3, 2002	E3208	15.03
29	7	"Tomorrow"	Don Scardino	S : René Balcer; S/T : Stephanie Sengupta	November 10, 2002	E3207	15.88
30	8	"The Pilgrim"	Darnell Martin	S : René Balcer; S/T : Marlane Gomard Meyer	November 17, 2002	E3210	16.23
31	9	"Shandeh"	Steve Shill	René Balcer	December 1, 2002	E3216	13.75
32	10	"Con-Text"	Alex Zakrzewski	S : René Balcer; S/T : Gerry Conway	January 5, 2003	E3213	15.01
33	11	"Baggage"	Constantine Makris	S : René Balcer; S/T : Theresa Rebeck	January 12, 2003	E3209	16.21
34	12	"Suite Sorrow"	Jean de Segonzac	S : René Balcer; S/T : Warren Leight	February 2, 2003	E3212	15.26
35	13	"See Me"	Steve Shill	S : René Balcer; S/T : Jim Sterling	February 9, 2003	E3211	15.87
36	14	"Probability"	Frank Prinzi	S : René Balcer; S/T : Gerry Conway	February 16, 2003	E3218	14.82
37	15	"Monster"	Joyce Chopra	S : René Balcer; S/T : Marlane Gomard Meyer	March 2, 2003	E3214	17.32
38	16	"Cuba Libre"	Darnell Martin	S : René Balcer; S/T : Warren Leight	March 9, 2003	E3215	14.96
39	17	"Cold Comfort"	Constantine Makris	S : René Balcer; S/T : Stephanie Sengupta	March 30, 2003	E3217	14.51
40	18	"Legion"	Steve Shill & Frank Prinzi	S : René Balcer; S/T : Theresa Rebeck	April 6, 2003	E3219	15.59
41	19	"Cherry Red"	Frank Prinzi	S : René Balcer; S/T : Jim Sterling	April 27, 2003	E3221	13.41
42	20	"Blink"	Don Scardino	S : René Balcer; S/T : Gerry Conway	May 4, 2003	E3222	14.29
43	21	"Graansha"	Darnell Martin	S : René Balcer; S/T : Joe Gannon	May 11, 2003	E3224	13.01
44	22	"Zoonotic"	Don Scardino	S : René Balcer; S/T : Warren Leight	May 18, 2003	E3225	14.46
45	23	"A Person of Interest"	Frank Prinzi	S : René Balcer; S/T : Warren Leight	May 18, 2003	E3220	16.17

=== Season 3 (2003–04) ===
- Samantha Buck has a recurring role as Detective Lynn Bishop from the episode "Pravda" to "Mad Hops" while Kathryn Erbe was on maternity leave (though she occasionally appeared in the episodes).
- Fred Berner joins as executive producer.

No. overall	No. in season	Title	Directed by	Written by	Original release date	Prod. code	U.S. viewers (millions)
46	1	"Undaunted Mettle"	Steve Shill	S : René Balcer; S/T : Stephanie Sengupta	September 28, 2003	E4502	15.84
47	2	"Gemini"	Frank Prinzi	S : René Balcer; S/T : Jim Sterling	October 5, 2003	E4503	14.29
48	3	"The Gift"	Alex Zakrzewski	S : René Balcer; S/T : Marlene Meyer	October 12, 2003	E4501	14.41
49	4	"But Not Forgotten"	Constantine Makris	S : René Balcer; S/T : Gerry Conway	October 19, 2003	E4504	14.88
50	5	"Pravda"	Alex Zakrzewski	S : René Balcer; S/T : Warren Leight	October 26, 2003	E4509	15.16
51	6	"Stray"	Frank Prinzi	S : René Balcer; S/T : Elizabeth Benjamin	November 2, 2003	E4511	13.50
52	7	"A Murderer Among Us"	Steve Shill	S : René Balcer; S/T : Diana Son	November 9, 2003	E4512	13.18
53	8	"Sound Bodies"	Jean de Segonzac & Frank Prinzi	René Balcer	November 16, 2003	E4513	12.54
54	9	"Happy Family"	Frank Prinzi	S : René Balcer; S/T : Marlene Meyer	November 23, 2003	E4508	14.21
55	10	"F.P.S."	Darnell Martin	S : René Balcer; S/T : Gerry Conway	January 4, 2004	E4506	13.21
56	11	"Mad Hops"	Christopher Swartout	S : René Balcer; S/T : Jim Sterling	January 11, 2004	E4514	16.11
57	12	"Unrequited"	Jean de Segonzac	S : René Balcer; S/T : Stephanie Sengupta	January 18, 2004	E4507	11.98
58	13	"Pas de Deux"	Frank Prinzi	S : René Balcer; S/T : Warren Leight	February 15, 2004	E4516	13.30
59	14	"Mis-Labeled"	Joyce Chopra	S : René Balcer; S/T : Elizabeth Benjamin	February 22, 2004	E4515	14.08
60	15	"Shrink-Wrapped"	Jean de Segonzac	Diana Son	March 7, 2004	E4510	14.99
61	16	"The Saint"	Frank Prinzi	S : René Balcer; S/T : Marlene Meyer	March 14, 2004	E4517	14.62
62	17	"Conscience"	Alex Chapple	S : René Balcer; S/T : Gerry Conway	March 28, 2004	E4519	14.40
63	18	"Ill-Bred"	Steve Shill	S : René Balcer; S/T : Jim Sterling	April 18, 2004	E4520	14.25
64	19	"Fico di Capo"	Alex Zakrzewski	S : René Balcer; S/T : Stephanie Sengupta	May 9, 2004	E4518	11.64
65	20	"D.A.W."	Frank Prinzi	S : René Balcer; S/T : Warren Leight	May 16, 2004	E4522	13.74
66	21	"Consumed"	Steve Shill	S : René Balcer; S/T : Warren Leight	May 23, 2004	E4524	13.04

=== Season 4 (2004–05) ===
- Chris Noth returns and reprises his role as Detective Mike Logan in the episode “Stress Position”

No. overall	No. in season	Title	Directed by	Written by	Original release date	Prod. code	U.S. viewers (millions)
67	1	"Semi-Detached"	Frank Prinzi	S : René Balcer; S/T : Gerry Conway	September 26, 2004	E5404	12.67
68	2	"The Posthumous Collection"	Jean de Segonzac	S : René Balcer; S/T : Marlane Meyer	October 3, 2004	E5425	11.00
69	3	"Want"	Frank Prinzi	S : René Balcer; S/T : Elizabeth Benjamin	October 10, 2004	E5407	12.81
70	4	"Great Barrier"	Frank Prinzi	S : René Balcer; S/T : Diana Son	October 17, 2004	E5402	11.92
71	5	"Eosphoros"	Alex Zakrzewski	S : René Balcer; T : Stephanie Sengupta	October 24, 2004	E5401	12.40
72	6	"In the Dark"	Alex Chapple	S : René Balcer; S/T : Jim Sterling	October 31, 2004	E5403	11.51
73	7	"Magnificat"	Frank Prinzi	S : René Balcer; S/T : Diana Son	November 7, 2004	E5414	11.53
74	8	"Silver Lining"	Kevin Dowling	S : René Balcer; S/T : Marlane Meyer	November 14, 2004	E5409	15.16
75	9	"Inert Dwarf"	Alex Chapple	S : René Balcer; S/T : Warren Leight	November 21, 2004	E5408	13.47
76	10	"View from Up Here"	Alex Chapple	S : René Balcer; S/T : Jim Sterling	January 2, 2005	E5410	14.85
77	11	"Gone"	Christopher Swartout	S : René Balcer; S/T : Stephanie Sengupta	January 9, 2005	E5406	13.23
78	12	"Collective"	Frank Prinzi	S : René Balcer; S/T : Gerry Conway	January 30, 2005	E5411	14.26
79	13	"Stress Position"	Frank Prinzi	S : Warren Leight & René Balcer; S/T : Charlie Rubin	February 13, 2005	E5416	13.53
80	14	"Sex Club"	Alex Chapple	S : René Balcer; S/T : Elizabeth Benjamin	February 20, 2005	E5415	9.04
81	15	"Death Roe"	Rick Wallace	S : René Balcer; S/T : Warren Leight	March 13, 2005	E5405	15.72
82	16	"Ex Stasis"	Bill L. Norton	S : René Balcer; S/T : Diana Son	March 20, 2005	E5419	12.35
83	17	"Shibboleth"	Darnell Martin	S : René Balcer; S/T : Stephanie Sengupta	March 27, 2005	E5418	10.70
84	18	"The Good Child"	Jean de Segonzac	S : René Balcer; S/T : Marlane Meyer	April 3, 2005	E5421	12.98
85	19	"Beast"	Frank Prinzi	S : René Balcer; S/T : Gina Gionfriddo	April 10, 2005	E5420	10.94
86	20	"No Exit"	Jean de Segonzac	S : René Balcer; S/T : Gerry Conway	May 1, 2005	E5423	11.60
87	21	"The Unblinking Eye"	Frank Prinzi	S : René Balcer; S/T : Jim Sterling	May 8, 2005	E5424	11.54
88	22	"My Good Name"	Alex Zakrzewski	S : René Balcer; S/T : Warren Leight	May 15, 2005	E5422	10.32
89	23	"False-Hearted Judges"	Jean de Segonzac	S : René Balcer; S/T : Diana Son	May 25, 2005	E5426	14.98

=== Season 5 (2005–06) ===
- Chris Noth (Detective Mike Logan) and Annabella Sciorra (Detective Carolyn Barek) join the cast to alternate episodes with stars Vincent D'Onofrio and Kathryn Erbe, due to some health issues D'Onofrio had the previous season.
- D'Onofrio, Erbe, Noth, and Sciorra work together on the two-part mid-season episode(s) "In The Wee Small Hours", with all four walking with Jamey Sheridan (Captain James Deakins) and Courtney B. Vance (A.D.A. Ron Carver) on screen during the opening credits.
- Sciorra, Sheridan, and Vance depart the cast at the end of the season; no explanation was given for Sciorra and Vance's departure.

No. overall	No. in season	Title	Directed by	Written by	Original release date	Prod. code	U.S. viewers (millions)
90	1	"Grow"	Frank Prinzi	S : René Balcer; S/T : Marlane Gomard Meyer	September 25, 2005	05001	10.72
91	2	"Diamond Dogs"	Norberto Barba	S : Warren Leight & René Balcer; S/T : Charlie Rubin	October 2, 2005	05002	12.35
92	3	"Prisoner"	Rick Wallace	S : René Balcer; S/T : Gina Gionfriddo	October 9, 2005	05003	12.89
93	4	"Unchained"	Alex Zakrzewski	S : René Balcer; S/T : Stephanie Sengupta	October 16, 2005	05004	10.18
94	5	"Acts of Contrition"	Frank Prinzi	S : René Balcer; S/T : Warren Leight	October 23, 2005	05005	10.45
95	6	"In the Wee Small Hours"	Jean de Segonzac	S : René Balcer; S/T : Stephanie Sengupta	November 6, 2005	05006	14.28
96	7	"In the Wee Small Hours"	Jean de Segonzac	S : René Balcer; S/T : Stephanie Sengupta	November 6, 2005	05007	14.28
97	8	"Saving Face"	Rick Wallace	S : René Balcer; S/T : Gerry Conway	November 27, 2005	05008	10.95
98	9	"Scared Crazy"	Marisol Torres	S : René Balcer; S/T : Diana Son	December 4, 2005	05009	11.85
99	10	"Dollhouse"	Frank Prinzi	S : René Balcer; S/T : Gina Gionfriddo	January 8, 2006	05010	10.79
100	11	"Slither"	Bill L. Norton	S : René Balcer; S/T : Marlane Gomard Meyer	January 15, 2006	05011	10.82
101	12	"Watch"	Alex Chapple	S : René Balcer; S/T : Charlie Rubin	January 22, 2006	05012	10.52
102	13	"Proud Flesh"	Frank Prinzi	S : René Balcer; S/T : Warren Leight	March 12, 2006	05013	12.27
103	14	"Wasichu"	Christopher Swartout	S : René Balcer; S/T : Diana Son	March 19, 2006	05014	11.38
104	15	"Wrongful Life"	Darnell Martin	S : René Balcer; S/T : Gerry Conway	March 26, 2006	05015	9.22
105	16	"Dramma Giocoso"	John David Coles	S : René Balcer; S/T : Stephanie Sengupta	April 9, 2006	05016	10.00
106	17	"Vacancy"	Jean de Segonzac	S : René Balcer; S/T : Gina Gionfriddo	April 16, 2006	05017	11.91
107	18	"The Healer"	Frank Prinzi	S : René Balcer; S/T : Marlane Gomard Meyer	April 23, 2006	05018	11.13
108	19	"Cruise to Nowhere"	Marisol Torres	S : René Balcer; S/T : Warren Leight	April 30, 2006	05019	9.69
109	20	"To the Bone"	Jean de Segonzac	S : Warren Leight & René Balcer; S/T : Charlie Rubin	May 7, 2006	05022	10.35
110	21	"On Fire"	Frank Prinzi	S : René Balcer; S/T : Diana Son	May 14, 2006	05021	11.92
111	22	"The Good"	Christopher Swartout	S : René Balcer; S/T : Gerry Conway	May 14, 2006	05020	11.92

=== Season 6 (2006–07) ===
- Julianne Nicholson (Detective Megan Wheeler) and Eric Bogosian (Captain Daniel Ross) join the cast.
- Warren Leight replaces René Balcer as showrunner. Norberto Barba replaces Fred Berner as executive producer.
- The final season to air original episodes on NBC.

No. overall	No. in season	Title	Directed by	Written by	Original release date	Prod. code	U.S. viewers (millions)
112	1	"Blind Spot"	Norberto Barba	S : Warren Leight; S/T : Charlie Rubin	September 19, 2006	06001	11.57
113	2	"Tru Love"	Norberto Barba	S : Warren Leight; S/T : Diana Son	September 26, 2006	06004	10.61
114	3	"Siren Call"	Frank Prinzi	S : Warren Leight; S/T : Julie Martin	October 3, 2006	06005	12.18
115	4	"Maltese Cross"	Jim McKay	Jacquelyn Reingold	October 10, 2006	06006	11.47
116	5	"Bedfellows"	Frank Prinzi	S : Julie Martin & Warren Leight; S/T : Stephanie Sengupta	October 17, 2006	06003	10.99
117	6	"Masquerade"	Christine Moore	S : Warren Leight; S/T : Gina Gionfriddo	October 31, 2006	06007	8.47
118	7	"Country Crossover"	Bill L. Norton	S : Warren Leight; S/T : Gina Gionfriddo	November 7, 2006	06002	7.39
119	8	"The War at Home"	Darnell Martin	S : Julie Martin & Warren Leight; S/T : Diana Son	November 14, 2006	06009	9.14
120	9	"Blasters"	Constantine Makris	S : Warren Leight; S/T : Charlie Rubin	November 21, 2006	06008	9.26
121	10	"Weeping Willow"	Tom DiCillo	S : Warren Leight; S/T : Stephanie Sengupta	November 28, 2006	06010	9.76
122	11	"World's Fair"	Steve Shill	S : Julie Martin & Warren Leight; S/T : Jacquelyn Reingold	January 2, 2007	06012	13.38
123	12	"Privilege"	Jean de Segonzac	Warren Leight, Julie Martin & Siobhan Byrne O'Connor	January 9, 2007	06013	11.78
124	13	"Albatross"	Frank Prinzi	S : Warren Leight; S/T : Marsha Norman	February 6, 2007	06011	8.81
125	14	"Flipped"	Jim McKay	S : Warren Leight; S/T : Charles Kipps	February 13, 2007	06014	8.50
126	15	"Brother's Keeper"	Ken Girotti	S : Warren Leight; S/T : Marsha Norman	February 20, 2007	06015	9.39
127	16	"30"	Andrei Belgrader & Jean de Segonzac	S : Warren Leight; S/T : Charlie Rubin	February 27, 2007	06016	9.26
128	17	"Players"	Tom DiCillo	S : Warren Leight; S/T : Peter Blauner	March 27, 2007	06018	8.85
129	18	"Silencer"	Dean White	S : Warren Leight; S/T : Marygrace O'Shea	April 3, 2007	06017	7.14
130	19	"Rocket Man"	Michael Smith	S : Julie Martin & Warren Leight; S/T : Siobhan Byrne O'Connor	May 1, 2007	06019	7.36
131	20	"Bombshell"	Darnell Martin	S : Julie Martin & Warren Leight; T : Brant Englestein	May 8, 2007	06020	6.94
132	21	"Endgame"	Jean de Segonzac	T : Julie Martin; S/T : Kate Rorick & Warren Leight	May 14, 2007	06021	7.20
133	22	"Renewal"	Norberto Barba	S : Warren Leight; S/T : Jacquelyn Reingold	May 21, 2007	06022	8.85

=== Season 7 (2007–08) ===
- The show moved this season to USA Network to air original episodes.
- Alicia Witt joins the cast as Detective Nola Falacci from the episode "Seeds" to "Senseless" while Julianne Nicholson was on maternity leave. Nicholson returned in the episode "Contract".

No. overall	No. in season	Title	Directed by	Written by	USA air date	NBC air date	Prod. code	U.S. viewers (millions)
134	1	"Amends"	Jesús S. Treviño	S : Warren Leight; S/T : Siobhan Byrne O'Connor	October 4, 2007	January 9, 2008	07003	3.75
135	2	"Seeds"	Jean de Segonzac	S : Warren Leight; S/T : Peter Blauner	October 11, 2007	January 16, 2008	07004	3.41
136	3	"Smile"	Michael Smith	S : Warren Leight; S/T : Charlie Rubin	October 18, 2007	February 20, 2008	07005	4.54
137	4	"Lonelyville"	Constantine Makris	S : Warren Leight & Julie Martin; S/T : Jacquelyn Reingold	October 25, 2007	February 27, 2008	07006	3.61
138	5	"Depths"	Norberto Barba	S : Warren Leight & Julie Martin; S/T : Diana Son	November 1, 2007	March 5, 2008	07001	3.58
139	6	"Courtship"	Jean de Segonzac	Warren Leight & Julie Martin	November 8, 2007	March 12, 2008	07002	3.28
140	7	"Self-Made"	Ken Girotti	S : Warren Leight; S/T : Jerome Hairston	November 15, 2007	January 23, 2008	07007	8.20
141	8	"Offense"	Tom DiCillo	S : Julie Martin; T : Kate Rorick	November 29, 2007	February 13, 2008	07008	3.85
142	9	"Untethered"	Ken Girotti	Warren Leight, Charlie Rubin and Diana Son	December 6, 2007	February 6, 2008	07009	4.57
143	10	"Senseless"	Jean de Segonzac	S : Warren Leight; T : Julie Martin; S/T : Siobhan Byrne O'Connor	December 13, 2007	January 30, 2008	07010	4.33
144	11	"Purgatory"	Jesús S. Treviño	S : Warren Leight; S/T : Siobhan Byrne O'Connor	June 8, 2008	June 21, 2008	07011	4.52
145	12	"Contract"	Jonathan Herron	S : Warren Leight; S/T : Peter Blauner	June 15, 2008	June 28, 2008	07012	3.35
146	13	"Betrayed"	Michael Smith	S : Warren Leight and Charlie Rubin; T : Diana Son & Marygrace O'Shea	June 22, 2008	July 5, 2008	07013	4.69
147	14	"Assassin"	Norberto Barba	S : Warren Leight; T : Eric Overmyer; S/T : Julie Martin	June 29, 2008	July 12, 2008	07014	4.04
148	15	"Please Note We Are No Longer Accepting Letters of Recommendation from Henry Kissinger"	Kevin Bray	S : Warren Leight; T : Marygrace O'Shea	July 6, 2008	July 19, 2008	07015	4.88
149	16	"Reunion"	Jean de Segonzac	S : Warren Leight; S/T : Jacquelyn Reingold	July 13, 2008	July 26, 2008	07016	4.89
150	17	"Vanishing Act"	Peter Werner	S : Warren Leight; S/T : Jerome Hairston	July 20, 2008	August 2, 2008	07017	4.83
151	18	"Ten Count"	Alex Chapple	S : Warren Leight; S/T : Julie Martin	July 27, 2008	September 6, 2008	07018	4.32
152	19	"Legacy"	Betty Kaplan	S : Warren Leight; T : Kate Rorick; S/T : Alan Kingsberg	August 3, 2008	September 10, 2008	07019	4.92
153	20	"Neighborhood Watch"	Kevin Bray	S : Warren Leight; S/T : Eric Overmyer	August 10, 2008	September 13, 2008	07020	4.16
154	21	"Last Rites"	Tom DiCillo	S : Warren Leight and Peter Blauner; T : Siobhan Byrne O'Connor & Marygrace O'Shea	August 17, 2008	September 17, 2008	07021	4.64
155	22	"Frame"	Norberto Barba	S : Warren Leight; T : Julie Martin & Kate Rorick	August 24, 2008	September 20, 2008	07022	5.20

=== Season 8 (2009) ===
- Jeff Goldblum joins the cast as Detective Zack Nichols, replacing Chris Noth.
- Warren Leight is replaced by Walon Green (Goren/Eames episodes) and Robert Nathan (Nichols/Wheeler episodes) as showrunner. Nathan later left and was replaced by Ed Zuckerman. Michael S. Chernuchin and John David Coles also join as executive producer. This change in showrunners caused the season to be delayed from November 7, 2008, to January and February 2009 to the premiere date of April 19, 2009 and also to have the episodes aired out of chronological order.
- At the end of the season, Kathryn Erbe replaced Julianne Nicholson who had to go on maternity leave. Nicholson opted not to return the following season.

No. overall	No. in season	Title	Directed by	Written by	USA air date	NBC air date	Prod. code	U.S. viewers (millions)
156	1	"Playing Dead"	Michael Smith	Antoinette Stella	April 19, 2009	May 6, 2009	08009	4.57
157	2	"Rock Star"	Bill D'Elia	Ed Zuckerman	April 26, 2009	May 13, 2009	08008	4.10
158	3	"Identity Crisis"	Michael Smith	Pamela Wechsler	May 3, 2009	May 20, 2009	08005	3.14
159	4	"In Treatment"	Jean de Segonzac	Timothy J. Lea	May 10, 2009	May 27, 2009	08010	3.14
160	5	"Faithfully"	Jean de Segonzac	Antoinette Stella	May 17, 2009	June 29, 2009	08001	3.70
161	6	"Astoria Helen"	Norberto Barba	Timothy J. Lea	May 31, 2009	July 6, 2009	08004	3.97
162	7	"Folie à Deux"	David Manson	Michael S. Chernuchin	June 7, 2009	July 13, 2009	08003	4.01
163	8	"The Glory That Was..."	Norberto Barba	Robert Nathan	June 14, 2009	July 20, 2009	08002	4.14
164	9	"Family Values"	Jean de Segonzac	S : Antoinette Stella; S/T : Walon Green	June 21, 2009	August 3, 2009	08015	3.44
165	10	"Salome in Manhattan" "Salome"	Steve Shill	Andrew Lipsitz	June 28, 2009	August 10, 2009	08006	4.70
166	11	"Lady's Man"	Ken Girotti	Michael S. Chernuchin	June 28, 2009	August 17, 2009	08011	4.60
167	12	"Passion"	Jonathan Herron	Michael S. Chernuchin	July 12, 2009	August 24, 2009	08012	3.47
168	13	"All In"	David Manson	T : Antoinette Stella & Walon Green; S/T : Pamela Wechsler	July 19, 2009	August 31, 2009	08013	4.14
169	14	"Major Case"	Chris Zalla	Andrew Lipsitz	July 26, 2009	August 31, 2009	08014	4.63
170	15	"Alpha Dog"	Norberto Barba	Walon Green	August 2, 2009	September 7, 2009	08007	4.23
171	16	"Revolution"	John David Coles	Michael S. Chernuchin	August 9, 2009	September 7, 2009	08016	4.83

=== Season 9 (2010) ===
- A cast shake-up occurs where D'Onofrio, Erbe, and Bogosian depart the cast after the two-part premiere episode "Loyalty", which features Goldblum, D'Onofrio, and Erbe working a special case together (a one-time-only opening credits for "Loyalty (Part 2)" featured these three actors together). Saffron Burrows (Detective Serena Stevens) joins the cast in the full-team investigation in "Loyalty (Part 2)" as a replacement for Nicholson (and replacing Erbe from episode 3 onwards). Mary Elizabeth Mastrantonio joins the cast as Captain Zoe Callas.
- Walon Green becomes the showrunner for all episodes.
- At the end of the season, Goldblum, Burrows, and Mastrantonio depart the cast.

No. overall	No. in season	Title	Directed by	Written by	USA air date	NBC air date	Prod. code	U.S. viewers (millions)
172	1	"Loyalty (Part 1)" "Puntland"	Jean de Segonzac	Walon Green	March 30, 2010	August 15, 2010	09001	3.56
173	2	"Loyalty (Part 2)" "Artifice"	Jean de Segonzac	Barbara Hall	April 6, 2010	June 20, 2010	09002	3.47
174	3	"Broad Channel"	Omar Madha	Mark Malone	April 13, 2010	June 27, 2010	09003	3.21
175	4	"Delicate"	Tom DiCillo	Nicole Mirante-Matthews	April 20, 2010	June 27, 2010	09006	3.53
176	5	"Gods & Insects"	Jonathan Herron	Ted Sullivan	April 27, 2010	July 4, 2010	09007	2.82
177	6	"Abel & Willing"	Kevin Bray	Michael Angeli	May 4, 2010	July 10, 2010	09008	2.82
178	7	"Love Sick"	Jim Hayman	Nicole Mirante-Matthews	May 11, 2010	July 11, 2010	09011	3.02
179	8	"Love on Ice"	Ken Girotti	David Klass & James Sadwith	May 18, 2010	July 17, 2010	09009	2.55
180	9	"Traffic"	Chris Zalla	Antoinette Stella	May 25, 2010	July 18, 2010	09012	2.86
181	10	"Disciple"	Christine Moore	Walon Green & Michael Angeli	June 1, 2010	July 24, 2010	09010	3.08
182	11	"Lost Children of the Blood"	John David Coles	Christine Bailey	June 8, 2010	July 25, 2010	09004	2.97
183	12	"True Legacy"	Yon Motskin	Antoinette Stella	June 15, 2010	July 31, 2010	09013	3.50
184	13	"The Mobster Will See You Now"	Jean de Segonzac	Michael Angeli	June 22, 2010	August 1, 2010	09015	4.40
185	14	"Palimpsest"	Darnell Martin	Mark Malone	June 29, 2010	August 7, 2010	09014	2.79
186	15	"Inhumane Society"	Michael Smith	Courtney Parker & Geoffrey Thorne	July 6, 2010	August 14, 2010	09005	2.99
187	16	"Three-In-One"	Arthur W. Forney	Walon Green & David Klass	July 6, 2010	August 21, 2010	09016	2.99

=== Season 10 (2011) ===
- This final season sees a return to the single, original pairing of the first four seasons, as Vincent D'Onofrio and Kathryn Erbe rejoin the cast as Detective Robert Goren and Detective Alex Eames.
- Jeff Goldblum (Detective Zack Nichols), Saffron Burrows (Detective Serena Stevens) and Mary Elizabeth Mastrantonio (Captain Zoe Callas) did not return for this final season.
- Jay O. Sanders (Captain Joseph Hannah) and Julia Ormond (Dr. Paula Gyson) join the cast, credited with "star" billing alongside D'Onofrio and Erbe.
- This is the shortest season of the entire series with only 8 episodes.
- Chris Brancato takes over as showrunner and executive producer, replacing Walon Green.

No. overall	No. in season	Title	Directed by	Written by	USA air date	NBC air date	Prod. code	U.S. viewers (millions)
188	1	"Rispetto"	Jean de Segonzac	Rick Eid	May 1, 2011	May 30, 2011	10004	5.10
189	2	"The Consoler"	Michael Smith	Chris Brancato	May 8, 2011	June 6, 2011	10001	3.68
190	3	"Boots on the Ground"	Jean de Segonzac	S : Paul Eckstein; S/T : Marlane Gomard Meyer	May 15, 2011	June 20, 2011	10002	3.83
191	4	"The Last Street in Manhattan"	Jean de Segonzac	Rick Eid	May 22, 2011	June 27, 2011	10006	3.33
192	5	"Trophy Wine"	Michael Smith	Warren Leight	June 5, 2011	July 11, 2011	10003	3.91
193	6	"Cadaver"	Frank Prinzi	Julie Martin	June 12, 2011	July 18, 2011	10005	3.59
194	7	"Icarus"	Frank Prinzi	Julie Martin	June 19, 2011	August 1, 2011	10007	3.27
195	8	"To the Boy in the Blue Knit Cap"	Jean de Segonzac	Julie Martin & Chris Brancato	June 26, 2011	Unaired	10008	3.75

== Home video releases ==
Season	Episodes	DVD release dates			
Season	Episodes	Region 1	Region 2	Region 4	Discs
1	22	October 21, 2003	February 28, 2005	January 19, 2005	6
2	23	December 12, 2006	July 17, 2006	January 19, 2005	5
3	21	September 14, 2004	April 13, 2009	June 3, 2009	3
4	23	November 24, 2009	December 28, 2009	December 2, 2009	5
5	22	May 18, 2010	August 16, 2010	September 29, 2010	5
6	22	June 28, 2011	TBA	TBA	5
7	22	June 26, 2012	TBA	TBA	5
8	15	October 23, 2012	TBA	TBA	4
9	16	December 11, 2012	TBA	TBA	4
10	8	March 12, 2013	TBA	TBA	2
Total	194	TBA	TBA	TBA	TBA

== See also ==
- List of Law & Order: Criminal Intent characters
