= Peter Appel (actor) =

American actor (born 1959)

- Born: October 19, 1959 (age 66); New York City, U.S.
- Education: Brandeis University, M.F.A.
- Occupation: Actor
- Years active: 1989–present
- Organization(s): Screen Actors Guild; AFTRA; Equity [U.S.]

Peter Appel (born October 19, 1959) is an American actor of stage, film, and television. He is known for Bad Education (2019), Luck (2011) and Léon: The Professional (1994).

== Early life and education ==
In 1987, Appel graduated with a Master of Fine Arts degree from Brandeis University. He also completed a two-year program at William Esper Studio, NYC in 1992.

== Career ==
Appel has appeared in over thirty films, and twenty television shows since the 1990s, in addition to theater roles.

On television, Appel has appeared in nine different roles for the Law & Order franchise alone.

He also performs as a voice actor for video game such as the Grand Theft Auto and Max Payne franchises, as well as Manhunt (2003) and The Warriors (2005).

== Filmography ==
=== Film ===
Peter Appel film credits
| Year | Title | Role | Ref. |
|---|---|---|---|
| 1989 | Silence Like Glass | | |
| 1990 | Everybody Wins | Sonny | |
| 1990 | Days of Thunder | Cole's Crew | |
| 1990 | Presumed Innocent | Glendenning | |
| 1991 | Regarding Henry | Eddie the Doorman | |
| 1991 | Shadows and Fog | Cop at Police Station | |
| 1992 | Basic Instinct | Detective | |
| 1993 | The Saint of Fort Washington | Demolition Man | |
| 1993 | Mr. Wonderful | Harry | |
| 1993 | Trip Nach Tunis | Mark | |
| 1994 | Léon: The Professional | Malky | |
| 1995 | The Jerky Boys | Sonny | |
| 1995 | Man of the House | Tony | |
| 1996 | Big Night | Chubby | |
| 1996 | Sleepers | Boyfriend | |
| 1996 | Extreme Measures | Det. Stone | |
| 1997 | Six Ways to Sunday | Abie - Arnie's Boss | |
| 1998 | The Tic Code | Engineer #1 | |
| 1998 | Side Streets | Boomir | |
| 1998 | Above Freezing | Al Bergdahl | |
| 1999 | Judy Berlin | Mr. V | |
| 1999 | Jump | Dominick | |
| 2000 | Overnight Sensation | Chase Davis | |
| 2000 | Coyote Ugly | Pizza Customer | |
| 2001 | Get Well Soon | Angry | |
| 2002 | Tadpole | Jimmy the Doorman | |
| 2002 | Spider-Man | Cabbie | |
| 2002 | Roger Dodger | Alert Doorman | |
| 2002 | Anything But Love | Man | |
| 2002 | Bedford Springs | Music Store Manager | |
| 2003 | God Has a Rap Sheet | Josh Zmirov | |
| 2003 | Marci X | Officer at Prison | |
| 2005 | Confess | Hummer Driver | |
| 2005 | Road | Bill the truck driver | |
| 2006 | Delirious | Feldman | |
| 2007 | Arranged | Yitzak Bellow | |
| 2007 | The Speed of Life | | |
| 2007 | Soul Mates | Poseidon | |
| 2008 | The Happening | Diner Owner | |
| 2009 | Bottleworld | Jim | |
| 2009 | Chico and Rita | (voice) | |
| 2010 | Harvest | Mario | |
| 2010 | Henry's Crime | Larry | |
| 2019 | Bad Education | Eddie / Custodian | |

=== Television ===
Peter Appel television credits
| Year | Title | Role | Notes | Ref. |
|---|---|---|---|---|
| 1991 | Law & Order | Baumann | Episode: "God Bless the Child" | |
| 1993 | All My Children | Cab Driver | 2 episodes | |
| 1993 | The Young Indiana Jones Chronicles | Ross | 1 episode | |
| 1993–2002 | NYPD Blue | Kenneth Hampton / Harvey | 2 episodes | |
| 1996 | The Sunshine Boys | Anson Black | TV movie | |
| 1998 | Witness to the Mob | Eddie Garafolo | TV movie | |
| 1999 | Oz | Lawrence Bailey | 1 episode | |
| 2000 | Cosby | Henry | 1 episode | |
| 2000 | Ed | Jack Fundus | 1 episode | |
| 2000 | Law & Order: Special Victims Unit | Detective Greenberg | Episode: "Contact" | |
| 2001 | Big Apple | John Corelli | 3 episodes | |
| 2002 | Law & Order: Criminal Intent | Louis Bernoff | Episode: "Shandeh" | |
| 2003 | Law & Order | Krakow | Episode: "Absentia" | |
| 2004 | Law & Order: Special Victims Unit | Marvin Friedman | Episode: "Painless" | |
| 2004 | Curb Your Enthusiasm | Doorman #2 | 1 episode | |
| 2005 | Law & Order: Trial by Jury | Frederick Merriwether | Episode: "41 Shots" | |
| 2005 | Hope & Faith | Ned | 1 episode | |
| 2007 | Law & Order: Criminal Intent | Dr. Holgreen | Episode: "Bombshell" | |
| 2007 | The Kill Point | Teddy Sabian | 5 episodes | |
| 2009 | Law & Order | Sturges | Episode: "Exchange" | |
| 2009 | Life on Mars | Demetri Pantos | 1 episode | |
| 2010 | Law & Order: Criminal Intent | Theodore "Cubby" Viviano | Episode: "The Mobster Will See You Now" | |
| 2011–2012 | Luck | Kagle | 3 episodes | |
| 2012 | Boardwalk Empire | Alby Gold | 1 episode | |
| 2012 | Blue Bloods | Joe Salducci | Episode: "Risk and Reward" | |
| 2022–2024 | Crash the System | Moishe Aharonov | 5 episodes | |

=== Video games ===
| Year | Title | Role | Note |
|---|---|---|---|
| 2005 | Grand Theft Auto: Liberty City Stories | Ray Machowski | Voice |

=== Theater ===
Peter Appel theater credits.
| Yearx | Title | Role | Venue | Ref. |
|---|---|---|---|---|
| 1987 | Richard II | Second Herald | New York Shakespeare Festival, Delacorte Theatre, Public Theatre, NYC | |
| 1987 | Henry IV Part 1 | Second Carrier / Sheriff / Lord / Soldier / Attendant | New York Shakespeare , Delacorte Theatre, Public Theatre, NYC | |
| 1987–1988 | A Midsummer Night's Dream | Snug / Lion | New York Shakespeare Festival, Anspacher Theatre, Public Theatre, NYC | |
| 1988 | Saved from Obscurity | | Playwrights Horizons, Upstairs Studio Theatre, NYC | |
| 1989 | Titus Andronicus | Clown | New York Shakespeare Festival, Delacorte Theatre, Public Theatre | |
| 1990 | The Taming of the Shrew | Biondello | New York Shakespeare Festival, Delacorte Theatre, Public Theatre | |
| 1991 | The Good Times Are Killing Me | Dad / Cousin Steve | Minetta Lane Theatre and McGinn-Cazale Theatre, NYC | |
| 1994–1995 | Him | Al / Disappointed fan / Stylagi | New York Shakespeare Festival, LuEsther Hall, Public Theatre, NYC | |
| 1996 | The Coyote Bleeds | Det. Hunt Moore | Worth Street Theatre, NYC | |
| 1998 | Snapshots '98 | | TriBeCa Playhouse, NYC | |
| 2000 | Anonymous | Roy Canelli | McGinn-Cazale Theatre, NYC | |
| 2015 | A Month in the Country | Balshintsov | Classic Stage Company, NYC | |
