= Law & Order: Criminal Intent season 2 =

Season of American television series

Law & Order: Criminal Intent
- Season 2
- Season 2 U.S. DVD cover
- No. of episodes: 23

Release
- Original network: NBC
- Original release: September 29, 2002 – May 18, 2003

Season chronology
- ← Previous; Season 1 Next → Season 3

The second season of Law & Order: Criminal Intent premiered September 29, 2002 and ended May 18, 2003 on NBC. In Indonesian, the series was aired on Trans TV in 2003-2004, in TPI (now MNCTV) in 2005-2006, Global TV (now GTV) in 2007-2008, in B-Channel (now RTV) in 2009-2010.

== Production ==
Law & Order: Criminal Intent was renewed a second season in May 2002 and production began in Summer 2002. Show runner/executive producer René Balcer became head writer this season, writing every episode of the season.

Peter Jankowski was promoted to executive producer this season; last season Jankowski was a co-executive producer. Co-executive producers this season were Fred Berner, Arthur W. Forney, and Theresa Rebeck with John L. Roman and Michael Kewley serving as producers. Supervising producers were Roz Weinman and Marlane Gomard Meyer. Original Law & Order writer and co-executive producer at the time, Michael S. Chernuchin was consulting producer and Tim DeLuca as associate producer. Mary Rae Thewlis became co-producer starting with the 6th episode, "Malignant". Warren Leight, who later became co-executive producer and then show runner/executive producer, began as a producer with the 10th episode, "Con-Text". Balcer hired Leight from a recommendation by co-executive producer, Theresa Rebeck.

== Cast ==
=== Main cast ===
- Vincent D'Onofrio as Detective Robert Goren
- Kathryn Erbe as Detective Alexandra Eames
- Jamey Sheridan as Captain James Deakins
- Courtney B. Vance as ADA Ron Carver

=== Recurring cast ===
- Leslie Hendrix as Chief Medical Examiner Elizabeth Rodgers

=== Notable guest stars ===
- Liam Aiken as Robbie Bishop
- Victor Argo as Mr. Garcia
- Matthew Arkin as Ben Gergis
- Tom Atkins as Mr. Monahan
- Karen Black as Vera Morgan
- Tammy Blanchard as Sarah Eldon
- Mark Blum as Dr. Philip Oliver
- Paul Calderon as Jojo Rios
- Reg E. Cathey as Professor Roland Sanders
- Kim Chan as Mr. Hsu
- Ken Cheeseman as Leo Gergis
- Dennis Christopher as Roger Coffman
- Olivia d'Abo as Nicole Wallace / Elizabeth Hitchens
- Paul Dooley as Stan Coffman
- Lisa Eichhorn as Dr. Leonard
- Ned Eisenberg as Danny Sussman
- Linda Emond as Dr. Christine Fellowes
- Susan Floyd as Attorney Linda Bonham
- Peter Frechette as Stuart Gaston
- Jim Gaffigan as Russell Matthews
- Peter Gerety as George Dawkins
- Isabel Glasser as Elaine Gergis
- David Marshall Grant as ADA Peter Bonham
- Joel Grey as Milt Winters
- Tim Guinee as David Bishop
- John Benjamin Hickey as Randall Fuller
- Linda Lavin as Ursula Sussman
- Hal Linden as Mr. Turner
- Mark Linn-Baker as Wally Stevens
- Daniel London as Mark Bayley
- Deirdre Lovejoy as Penny Halliwell
- James McCaffrey as Daniel Croydon
- Lance Reddick as Jack Bernard
- Amy Ryan as Julie Turner
- William Sadler as Kyle Devlin
- Jay O. Sanders as Harry Rowan
- Josef Sommer as Spencer Durning
- Mike Starr as Ted Marston
- Adam Storke as Mark Dietrich
- Rider Strong as Ethan Edwards
- Lee Tergesen as Keith Ramsey
- Stephen Tobolowsky as Jim Halliwell
- Christopher Welch as Dr. Thomas Dysart
- Paul Wesley as Luke Miller
- Merritt Wever as Hannah Price
- Elizabeth Wilson as Lucille Mobray
- Frank Wood as George Weems

== Episodes ==
No. overall	No. in season	Title	Directed by	Written by	Original release date	Prod. code	U.S. viewers (millions)
23	1	"Dead"	Darnell Martin	S : René Balcer; S/T : Stephanie Sengupta	September 29, 2002	E3202	15.79
The murder of a mortician, and the discovery of corpses buried behind a crematorium, leads the detectives to a family man Harry Rowan (Jay O. Sanders) who claims to own a consulting business but is suspected of being a contract killer with a penchant for perfection. Goren proves Rowan's guilt by laying a trap that plays on his "fear of making a mistake".: Inspired in part by the Tri-State Crematory scandal.
24	2	"Bright Boy"	Frank Prinzi	S : René Balcer; S/T : Marlane Gomard Meyer	October 6, 2002	E3205	14.78
The double murder of a social services worker and a deputy mayor lead the detectives to suspect a couple who may have a grudge against the social worker for taking away their children. However, when they learn of the importance of the social worker's report on a boy, Robbie Bishop (Liam Aiken), being considered for admission to a prestigious school for gifted children, the trail leads to his obsessive father (Tim Guinee).
25	3	"Anti-Thesis"	Adam Bernstein	S : René Balcer & Dick Wolf; S/T : Eric Overmyer	October 13, 2002	E3203	14.61
Goren and Eames sift through the likely suspects in the murder of a university president and his assistant. Eventually they discover that the culprit is a wily adversary Elizabeth Hitchens / Nicole Wallace portrayed by Olivia d'Abo seeking residency in the USA who has made a career of scamming, identity theft and murder.
26	4	"Best Defense"	Gloria Muzio	S : René Balcer; S/T : Elizabeth M. Cosin	October 20, 2002	E3201	14.73
Assistant District Attorney Peter Bonham (David Marshall Grant), who had been receiving death threats, confronts and kills a hired gunman. Goren and Eames first suspect his wife, a prominent defense attorney Attorney Linda Bonham (Susan Floyd), through a convict whose case was being prosecuted by the A.D.A. and the rumors of her romantic affairs. After he realizes there are cracks in the A.D.A.'s seemingly airtight case, Goren keeps Carver in the dark about theory until he can trick Bonham into revealing his guilt.
27	5	"Chinoiserie"	David Platt	S : René Balcer; S/T : B. Mason	October 27, 2002	E3206	14.15
After a mother of two is shot to death in Chinatown, Goren and Eames first believe her death may be connected to the Tiananmen Square massacre. However, the investigation leads them to a smuggling ring that deals in Asian antiquities.
28	6	"Malignant"	Frank Prinzi & Juan J. Campanella	S : René Balcer; S/T : Michael S. Chernuchin	November 3, 2002	E3208	15.03
The robbery of a drug deliver van that involved two fatalities leads to pharmacist Jim Halliwell (Stephen Tobolowsky) who has been diluting cancer medication. Because Goren and Eames cannot use the exhumated bodies of patients who had been given the diluted medicine they trick him into revealing his guilt through his medical knowledge.
29	7	"Tomorrow"	Don Scardino	S : René Balcer; S/T : Stephanie Sengupta	November 10, 2002	E3207	15.88
The detectives investigate a triple murder, including the son and daughter of a wealthy businessman, that occurred in his apartment. After investigating the children's stepmother (his second wife), their attention turns to a pair of nannies Sarah Eldon (Tammy Blanchard) and Hannah Price (Merritt Wever), one of whom works for the family. To understand their motives, the detectives reach back to the nannies' history as orphaned sisters and discover their obsession with a family-based television soap opera and its influence on their behaviour.
30	8	"The Pilgrim"	Darnell Martin	S : René Balcer; S/T : Marlane Gomard Meyer	November 17, 2002	E3210	16.23
The detectives are called to investigate the disappearance of the adult daughter of a retired officer. Their search takes them to a case of domestic terrorism involving an illegal shipment of explosives and a pair of intending suicide bombers.
31	9	"Shandeh"	Steve Shill	René Balcer	December 1, 2002	E3216	13.75
When the wife of a prominent local businessman is strangled in her garage, her husband is initially suspected of hiring the two assailants. However, after Goren and Eames discover he had been having an affair for many years, their attention turns to his mother Ursula Sussman (Linda Lavin) who was afraid that of the scandal that would ensue if her daughter-in-law divorced her son.
32	10	"Con-Text"	Alex Zakrzewski	S : René Balcer; S/T : Gerry Conway	January 5, 2003	E3213	15.01
A young man, Douglas Morgan (Sean Dugan), confesses to the murder of his father and half-brother and gives their money to a motivational speaker and con-artist Randall Fuller (John Benjamin Hickey). Goren and Eames suspect Fuller exploited the fragile disciple by convincing him to commit murder for profit. Under the pretext of helping to elicit a detailed confession from Morgan, they trick Fuller into implicating himself in the scheme.
33	11	"Baggage"	Constantine Makris	S : René Balcer; S/T : Theresa Rebeck	January 12, 2003	E3209	16.21
When an airline baggage supervisor is found murdered in the trunk of her car, the detectives investigate the employees listed in a sexual harassment complaint which leads them to a scam involving credit cards and credit reports with foreign links.: Inspired by Susan Taraskiewicz case.
34	12	"Suite Sorrow"	Jean de Segonzac	S : René Balcer; S/T : Warren Leight	February 2, 2003	E3212	15.26
Nan Turner (Judith Roberts), the wealthy and matronly owner of a magnificent old hotel is found naked and murdered with injections of Botox in the bathtub. Detectives Goren and Eames focus on the victim's unstable adult daughter, Julie Turner (Amy Ryan), who resented her mother's meddling in her love life and murdered her. When Julie realizes that her father (Hal Linden) had manipulated her into killing her mother so he could gain control of the property, she stabs him to death.
35	13	"See Me"	Steve Shill	S : René Balcer; S/T : Jim Sterling	February 9, 2003	E3211	15.87
When Goren and Eames begin investigating the murder of a psychiatrist in a park, they are led to Garcia House, a corrupt charitable home for the homeless and mentally ill, run by Mr. Garcia (Victor Argo). Upon further investigation, the detectves suspect Dr. Thomas Dysart (Christopher Welch) an ophthalmologist who has been conducting experimental surgery on the eyes of schizophrenic residents of the home based on his personal flawed medical hypothesis.
36	14	"Probability"	Frank Prinzi	S : René Balcer; S/T : Gerry Conway	February 16, 2003	E3218	14.82
While probing the seemingly random murder of a homeless man, Leo Gergiss (Ken Cheeseman), Goren and Eames uncover a scam involving a crooked insurance agent Jack Bernard (Lance Reddick) and the mysterious of the deaths of several highly insured homeless people. Goren and Eames enlist the aid of Wally Stevens (Mark Linn-Baker), an insurance investigator with asperger syndrome, however he is later revealed to be the brains behind the scheme.
37	15	"Monster"	Joyce Chopra	S : René Balcer; S/T : Marlane Gomard Meyer	March 2, 2003	E3214	17.32
A narcissistic young man, Mark Dietrich (Adam Storke), is recently paroled after serving 15 years for strangling a young woman to death. A short while later his mother is murdered and Goren and Eames uncover that his mother suspected Mark had raped a woman some years earlier and that the investigating detective, Ted Marston (Mike Starr), had framed four innocent youths for the attack. They eventually charge Dietrich for the rape and Marston for the murder of Mark's mother.
38	16	"Cuba Libre"	Darnell Martin	S : René Balcer; S/T : Warren Leight	March 9, 2003	E3215	14.96
The trophy wife of a former prison inmate Milt Winters (Joel Grey) is murdered soon after his release from prison. Goren plays on Winters' paranoia to uncover that he paid a fellow inmate, Dempsey Powers (Clifton Powell), to kill her and his enemies in exchange for enough money to attempt an escape from prison and flee to Cuba.
39	17	"Cold Comfort"	Constantine Makris	S : René Balcer; S/T : Stephanie Sengupta	March 30, 2003	E3217	14.51
When Eloise Kittridge (Maureen Mueller) is murdered, Goren and Eames's investigation leads to a plot by the head of the Durning Foundation, Spencer Durning (Josef Sommer) to ensure his legacy. He acquired Eloise's father Randall Kitridge's recently deceased body from cryogenic storage to retrieve his brain for research because his son Nicholas (Jay Goede) is suffering from early onset Alzheimer's disease which Randall Kitridge had apparently recovered from in mid-life.
40	18	"Legion"	Steve Shill & Frank Prinzi	S : René Balcer; S/T : Theresa Rebeck	April 6, 2003	E3219	15.59
When a father and son are found dead with their throats slit, Goren and Eames discover that other boys have disappeared from the same neighborhood. When their parents do not cooperate with the investigation, the police believe local adolescent boys are being used by someone operating a bicycle theft ring. The boys' dedication to Roman stoicism inspired by an influential local sound studio operator, Jojo Rios (Paul Calderon), convinces the detectives that he is the ringleader and has ordered the murders.
41	19	"Cherry Red"	Frank Prinzi	S : René Balcer; S/T : Jim Sterling	April 27, 2003	E3221	13.41
Goren and Eames investigate the apparent accidental death of Kate Finoff (Liz Morton), a young woman who had been left only a small item from the estate of an elderly woman she cared. This leads them to a state public administrator Roger Coffman (Dennis Christopher). He has been plundering the estates of people who had died without leaving a will to indulge his passion for vintage muscle cars cuminating in the purchase of valuable a red Ferreari for which he killed the eldery woman. When Roger's ailing and selfish father (Paul Dooley) caught on to his son's activities, he murdered Kate to keep his son out of jail.
42	20	"Blink"	Don Scardino	S : René Balcer; S/T : Gerry Conway	May 4, 2003	E3222	14.29
Goren and Eames investigate the murder of Penny Chai, a college student who had worked with a group of fellow math students in a poker club scam. They uncover the group had assisted the ringleader Ken Harris (Ian Kahn), to electronically change bets between the time of horse races being run and the payouts so he can win big for his backers, the Israeli mafia. Harris appears to be a man completely without fear until Goren and Eames reveal his wife has lost faith in his invulnerability and greatly increased his insurance polcy. He then pleads guilty to Penny's murder in exchange for protection.
43	21	"Graansha"	Darnell Martin	S : René Balcer; S/T : Joe Gannon	May 11, 2003	E3224	13.01
Goren and Eames enter the closed world of a thieving Irish Traveller clan when they investigate the death of a probation officer, Ann Devlin Lawson, who had been run over three times by a car. They uncover that she had been providing Professor Malcolm Bryce (Tom Noonan) with background material on her clan as a way to save her niece from an arranged marriage. This arrangement was to repay a debt of her brother, Kyle Devlin (William Sadler), who killed Ann to keep her quiet.: NOTE: Lyric Marie Benson guest starred as a waitress in the episode. Benson was subsequently murdered by her ex-fiance, in a high-profile case which attracted widespread tabloid coverage.
44	22	"Zoonotic"	Don Scardino	S : René Balcer; S/T : Warren Leight	May 18, 2003	E3225	14.46
An investigation into the murder of a cop in a subway station leads Goren and Eames to believe he was blackmailing a pair of doctors; the voyeuristic Dr. Roger Stern (James Urbaniak) and oversexed exhibitionist Dr. Scott Borman (Todd Stashwick). Further investigation and evidence from an ex-girlfriend, Megan Colby (Carrie Preston), lead to an evidence that Stern has been infecting his former girlfriends with rare diseases. Goren plays on the doctors' obsessions to elicit their confessions.
45	23	"A Person of Interest"	Frank Prinzi	S : René Balcer; S/T : Warren Leight	May 18, 2003	E3220	16.17
Goren and Eames investigate the murder of Connie Matson (Susan Porro), a former nurse and who has been dealing in Anthrax vaccines which leads them to lab director Dr. Daniel Croydon (James McCaffrey) at a testing facility. After Goren pressures him in an interview he apparently suicides causing Goren to feel guilt for the death. Elizabeth Hitchens (Nicole Wallace) (Olivia d'Abo), now an American citizen after marrying an American, approaches Goren causing him to suspect she is behind Croyden's death. He has her arrested for violating US immigration laws but she asserts that she will not be convicted.

Preceded by Season One	List of Law & Order: Criminal Intent episodes	Succeeded by Season Three
