= Law & Order: Criminal Intent season 9 =

Season of American television series

Law & Order: Criminal Intent
- Season 9
- Season 9 U.S. DVD cover
- No. of episodes: 16

Release
- Original network: USA Network
- Original release: March 30 – July 6, 2010

Season chronology
- ← Previous; Season 8 Next → Season 10

The ninth season of Law & Order: Criminal Intent premiered on the USA Network on March 30, 2010, and ended on July 6, 2010.

After the two-part season premiere, Vincent D'Onofrio, Kathryn Erbe, and Eric Bogosian left the show. Bogosian's character (Capt. Daniel Ross) was killed off in the first part of the premiere. Bogosian was replaced in the cast by Mary Elizabeth Mastrantonio, playing Captain Zoe Callas. Saffron Burrows joined the cast (as Detective Serena Stevens), replacing Julianne Nicholson (who was pregnant and having a child during taping) who played Detective Megan Wheeler. Jeff Goldbum assumed the leading role.

The scene cards return in this season after three seasons.

Episodes from the ninth season of Law & Order: Criminal Intent also aired on NBC beginning Sunday, June 20 at 10:00 PM (Eastern) with repeats of those episodes airing Saturdays starting June 26 at 8:00 PM (Eastern). The episodes aired on NBC until Sunday, September 5, 2010. Bravo began airing season 9 episodes during early morning on Sundays starting November 21 at 2:00 AM until 4:00 AM.

== Cast ==
=== Main cast ===
- Vincent D'Onofrio as Detective Robert Goren (episodes 1–2)
- Kathryn Erbe as Detective Alexandra Eames (episodes 1–2)
- Eric Bogosian as Captain Daniel Ross (episode 1)
- Jeff Goldblum as Detective Zack Nichols
- Saffron Burrows as Detective Serena Stevens (episodes 2–16)
- Mary Elizabeth Mastrantonio as Captain Zoe Callas (episodes 3–16)

=== Recurring cast ===
- Nina Freeman as CSU Tech
- Traci Godfrey as Detective Agnes Farley
- Damon Gupton as Detective Gearhardt
- Leslie Hendrix as Chief M.E. Elizabeth Rodgers
- Amy Landecker as FBI Agent Stahl
- Mike Pniewski as Chief of Detectives Kenny Moran
- Brenda Withers as ADA Emma Niles
- David Zayas as Captain Pro Tem Stanley Maas

=== Guest stars ===
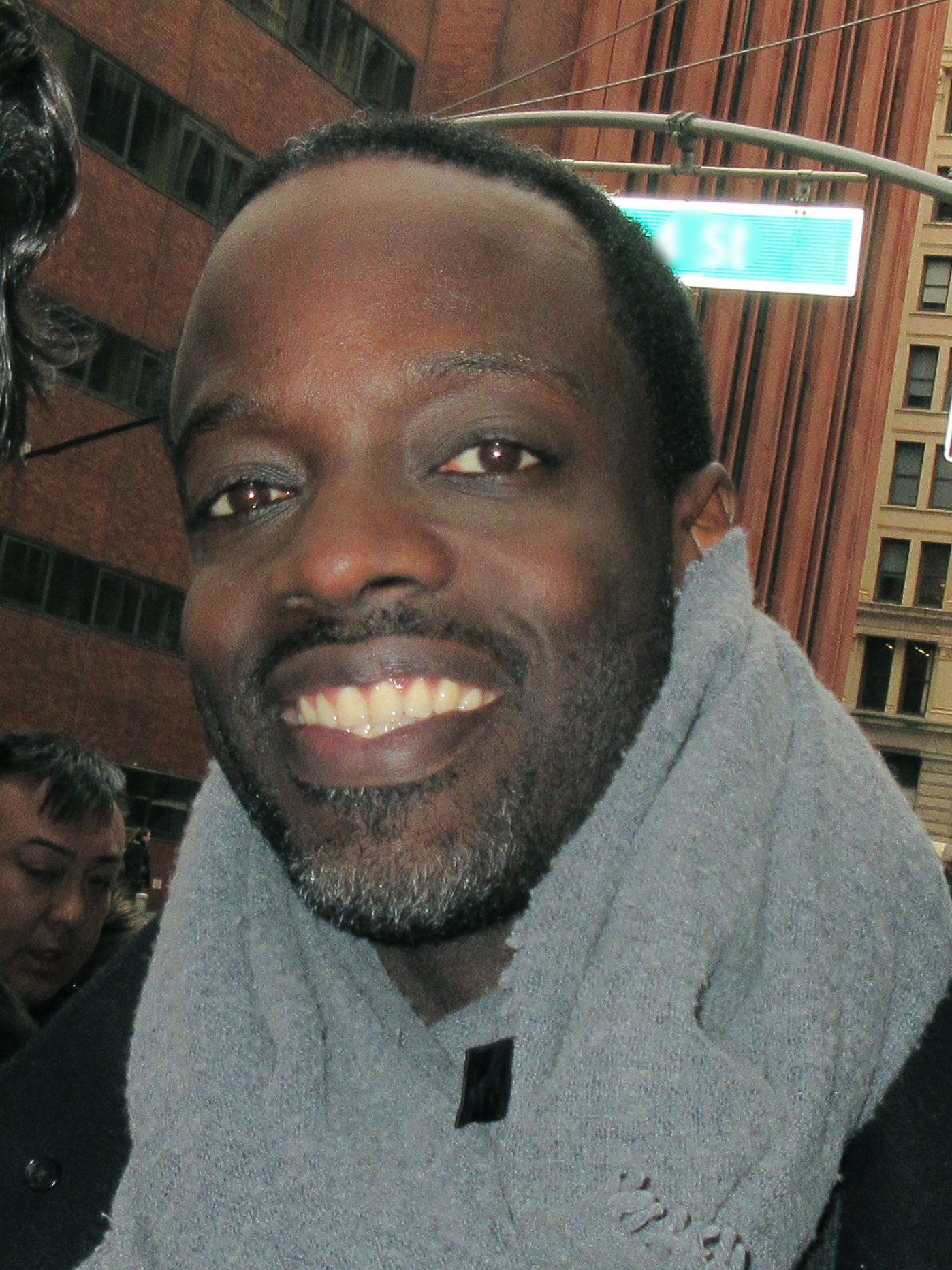
Ato Essandoh

Ato Essandoh guest stars as Hassan, the son of a Somali sheikh vying for power in "Loyalty" and Condola Rashad plays his sister, Khadra. His non-Muslim lover Jill Peek is played by Jicky Schnee. John Sharian plays Jan Van Dekker, an arms dealer in business with Hassan and Roy Loftin (David Pittu), and Ewa Da Cruz plays Dekker's lover Marya. Babs Olusanmokun plays a loyal assassin.

Kevin Conway portrays Irish mob boss Jackie Dooley in "Broad Channel," an island in Queens county. James Biberi plays dirty cop Ryan Fields who is killed after he arrests Russian mobster Valeyev (David Vadim). Det. Atwater (Adam Trese) tries and fails to shut Nichols and Stevens out of the case, but Callas helps by enlisting IAB Capt. Charles Galloway (Joseph Adams). Thomas McDonell plays Eddie Boyle, the son of Moira (Marin Hinkle) who has a past relationship with Dooley.

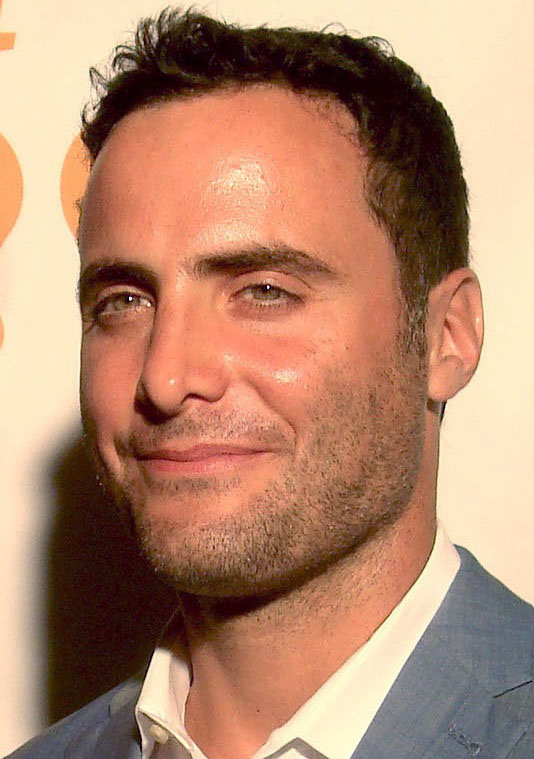
Dominic Fumusa

In "Delicate," Vivien Cardone as Paulette Bartol, and Melissa Benoist as Jessalyn Kerr, are struggling ballerinas who are understudies before the murder of a fellow student, Alona Landau (Lindsey Rose Sinclair), puts Jessalyn in the top spot.

Dominic Fumusa guest stars in "Gods & Insects" as Nathan Grayson, CEO of Willoughby Bank & Trust, and Jim True-Frost plays David Novak, Nathan's colleague and war buddy. Kate Jennings Grant plays David's wife Cynthia. Kevin Denaburg (played by Reginald Veneziano) blackmails with information provided by escort Amber Donelli (Bree Williamson); they sell it to gossip site TheFameHound.com, run by Eli Gold (Arian Moayed). Karen Olivo plays Amber's madam, Sierra Brandis, who runs Platinum Encounters.

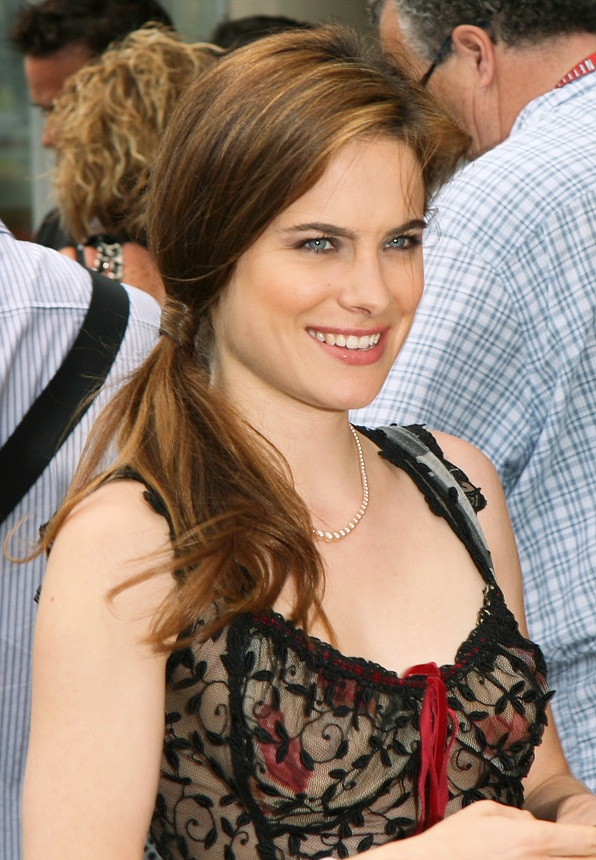
Caroline Dhavernas

In "Abel & Willing," Dallas Roberts plays Dr. Abel Hazard, a social worker descended from Leon Vorsichtiger (Steven Skybell) whose father survived the holocaust by killing his wife in a Nazi test similar to the Milgram experiment. Derek Cecil plays Ted Stoddard who has to choose whether to allow himself to be killed, or kill his own wife Linda (Nadia Bowers) to survive. Detectives find similar victims and one convict, Veronica Kalen (Eleanor Hutchins), who is already serving time for killing her husband by the same method.

Caroline Dhavernas as nurse's aid Maya Sills, and Dash Mihok as NYFD fireman Damon Kerrigan, guest star in "Love Sick" along with Michael Gladis who plays Randall Ames, a night nurse at a free clinic. When Rachel Melham (Megan Tusing), dressed as a hooker, turns up dead after visiting the clinic, major case investigates. Khan Baykal plays Rachel's boyfriend Jay Linnet, who says Rachel was not a prostitute. Colman Domingo plays Andre Lanier, a Jamaican drug dealer, who confirms he hit Rachel at a nightclub but did not kill her. Soon a second victim, Isabel Felix (Natalie Kuhn), is found dead but her mother Carol (Brooke Alexander) refutes that she was a prostitute. A third victim is then found alive; Janine Lutz, played by Cheryl Lynn Bowers.

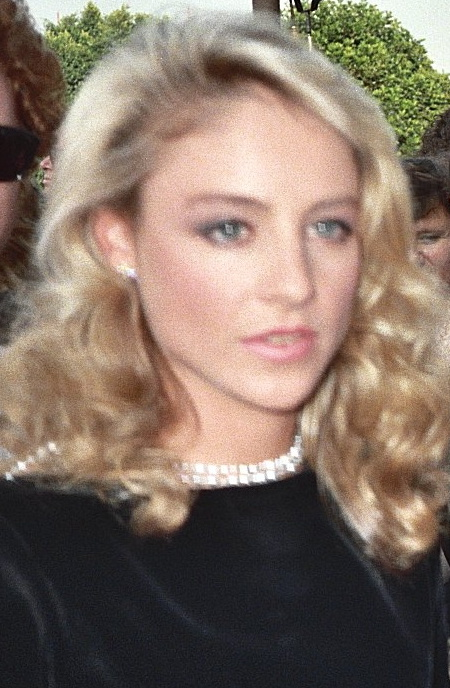
Tracy Pollan

In "Love on Ice," four buddies from the "Hard Guys" club who attended The Silesean Brothers Academy are haunted by a past tragedy, and one of them is murdered: Josh Burrow plays Bailey "Killer" O'Doyle, a former MLB player who is slain at Promontory Park; William Mapother plays John Silvestri, Dean of Students at St. Victor's in Far Rockaway; Josh Stamberg plays Dr. Chris Denardi, a cardiovascular surgeon at Webster General; Karl Bury plays Greg Foster, the "Staten Island Car King." Tina Benko plays Bailey's bitter wife Lani. Erin Dilly plays John's wife Anne, the sister of Tom Reynold who drowned years ago. In flashbacks, Bryan Dechart plays a younger John Silvestri. Curtiss Cook plays Ron Robbins, Bailey's baseball buddy who is now a minor league assistant coach.

Tracy Pollan guest stars as Patricia Caruso, a writer for Inset Magazine who becomes its new editor pro tem after its publisher Connor James (John Bolger) is murdered. This episode's title, "Traffic" refers to sex trafficking by the Russian mob, a possible motive in the crime. Conor Leslie portrays Mia, Patricia's daughter, who, as an NYU journalism major and YouTube essayist, is competing with her mother for publication. Bill Sage plays Patricia's ex-husband, who was an accomplished defense attorney for the Italian mob. Ian Kahn plays Frank Bolinger, an art director for Inset who is charged and incarcerated for the murder. Lizan Mitchell appears as Connor's housekeeper.

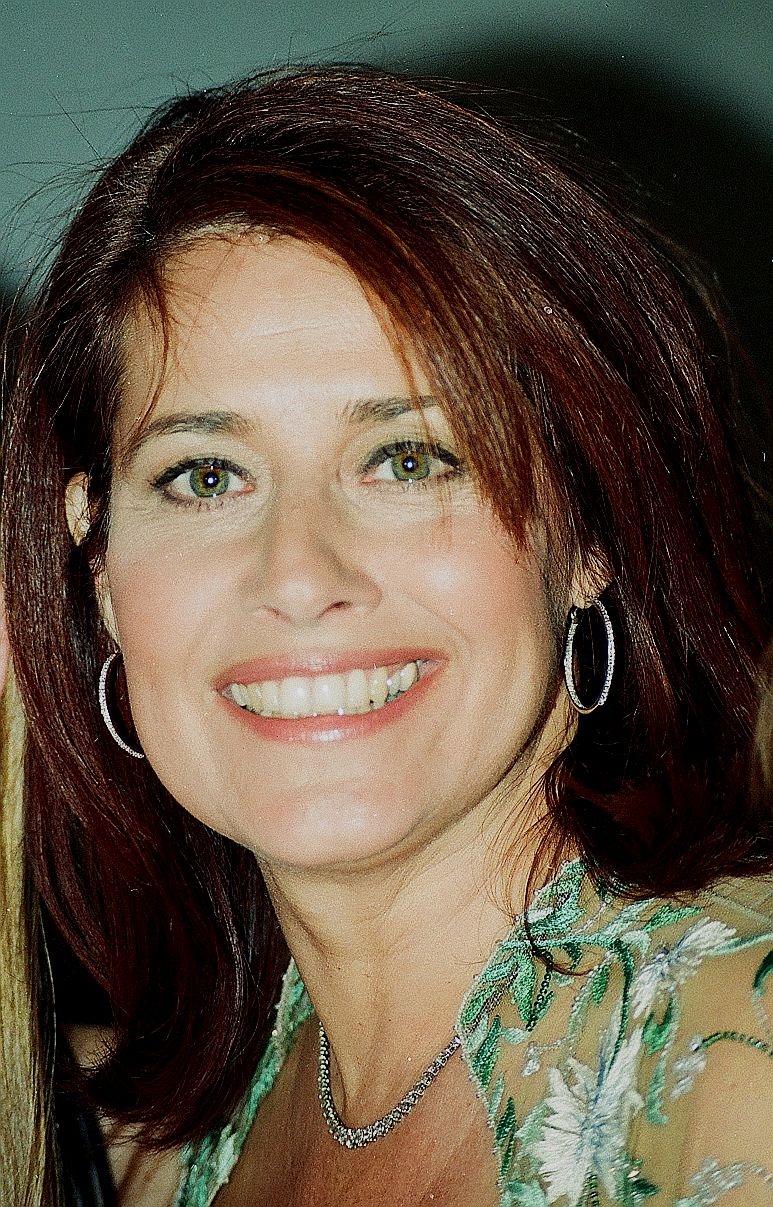
Lorraine Bracco

Ryan O'Nan guest stars as Dale Grisco, a landscaper and "Disciple" of confessed serial killer Elvis Howell (Chance Kelly). McCaleb Burnett plays Ernie, who Dale trains as his own disciple. Reathel Bean portrays Howell's "last rites" prison confessor, Rev. Shelby Redding, who passes along a vital clue to Stevens. Paul Calderón plays Marcus Feingold, who was Stevens' mentor at the homicide division of the Chicago PD. Lorraine Bracco makes a special guest appearance as the matron of the Dolores House foster home where Dale lived as a teen. Jessica Pimentel plays Gabriella Belteno, a friend of a more recent victim, Maricela Fernandez (Shoshanna Withers).

In "Lost Children of the Blood," Matt Burns portrays Virgil, AKA Jonathan Parish, a mortician who fancies himself a vampire and uses his protege Jeremy Parks, AKA Anton Lebrun (Clayne Crawford), to find new victims. Once such sucker is Sarah Price (Maïté Alina), an East Side College girl and disciple of Jung. Sarah's college professor is played by Rick Holmes, and her father is Ohio Congressman Price, played by Dan Butler. Her drop-out boyfriend, Kyle Wyler, is played by Christopher Abbott. Alysia Reiner guest stars as Michelle Linden, a wealthy married woman who is one of Anton's conquests.

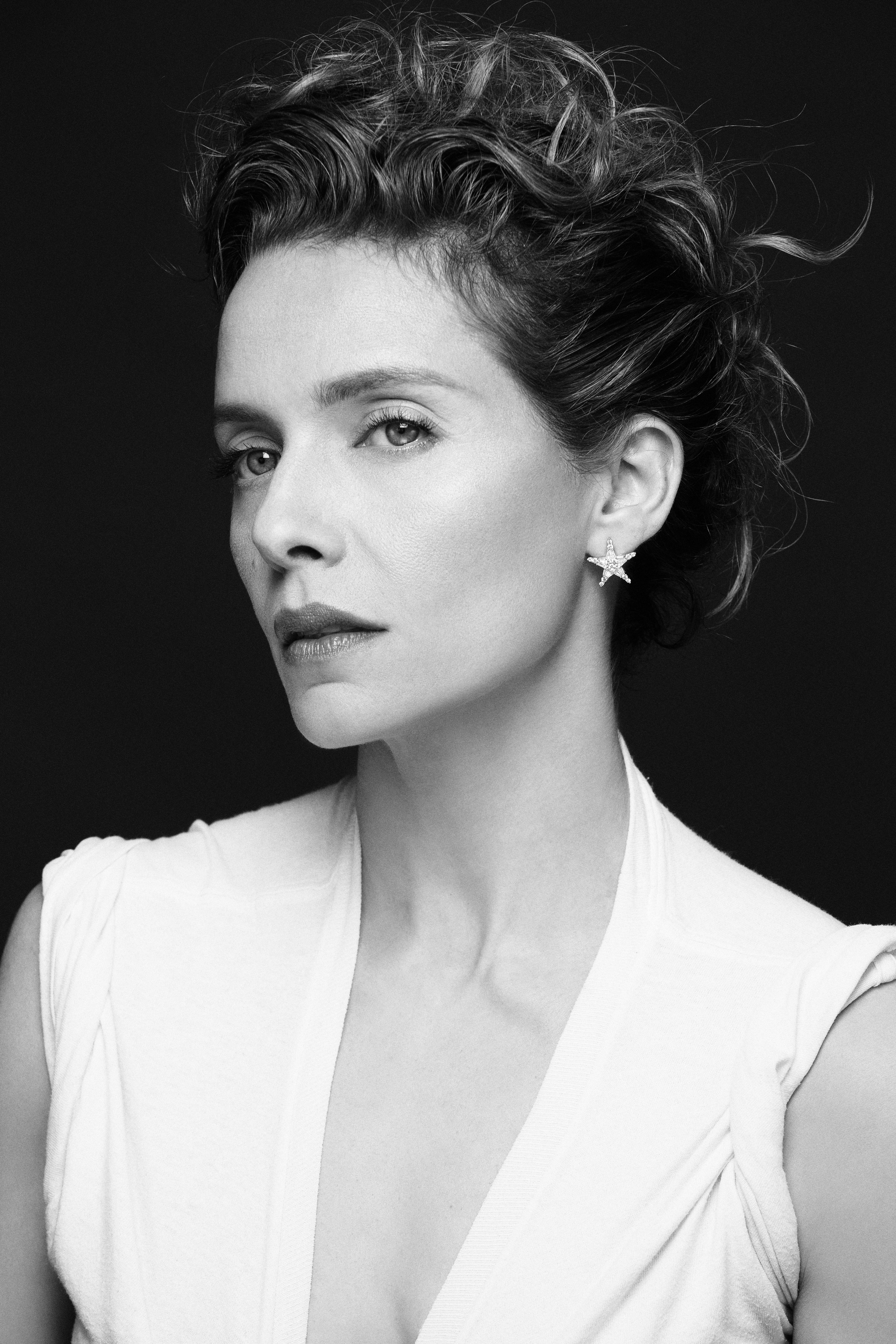
Mili Avital

José Zúñiga as New York Senator Victor Caldera and Laura Harring as Marta Castillo-Caldera want to build a "True Legacy" and stress family values in their political campaign. Their son Rick (James Martinez) is married to Angela (Holley Fain) who is having an affair with food truck vendor Ryan Foley (Mick Dempsey). When Ryan is murdered, detectives investigate the family, including Marta's brother, Hernando Castillo, AKA Tio Nando, played by Ramon Camín. Emanuele Ancorini plays Da Silva, the Castillo-Caldera family attorney.

In "The Mobster Will See You Now," Adam Rothenberg guest stars as Henry Di Piano, the son of mobster Magglio "Mag" Di Piano (Joseph Siravo) who is currently imprisoned for a concealed weapon charge. Henry tries to "go legit" by entering a hospital deal with two doctors, Joel Silverstern (Daniel London) and Shelly Springe (Kelly AuCoin), but they have been upcoding their clients and are being blackmailed by an inspector Les Tarney with the US HHS. When Tarney dies, Nichols suspects foul play by mobsters, but Bureau Chief of Trial Division ADA Roydell Getty (Nick Sandow) disagrees. Retired mobsters who financed the hospital include Dominic "Dom" Fabrigazzi Jr. (Lenny Venito), Anthony "Blev" Blevvins (Vincent Curatola), and Theodore "Cubby" Viviano (Peter Appel); Cathy Moriarty also guest stars as Annie Gentillo.

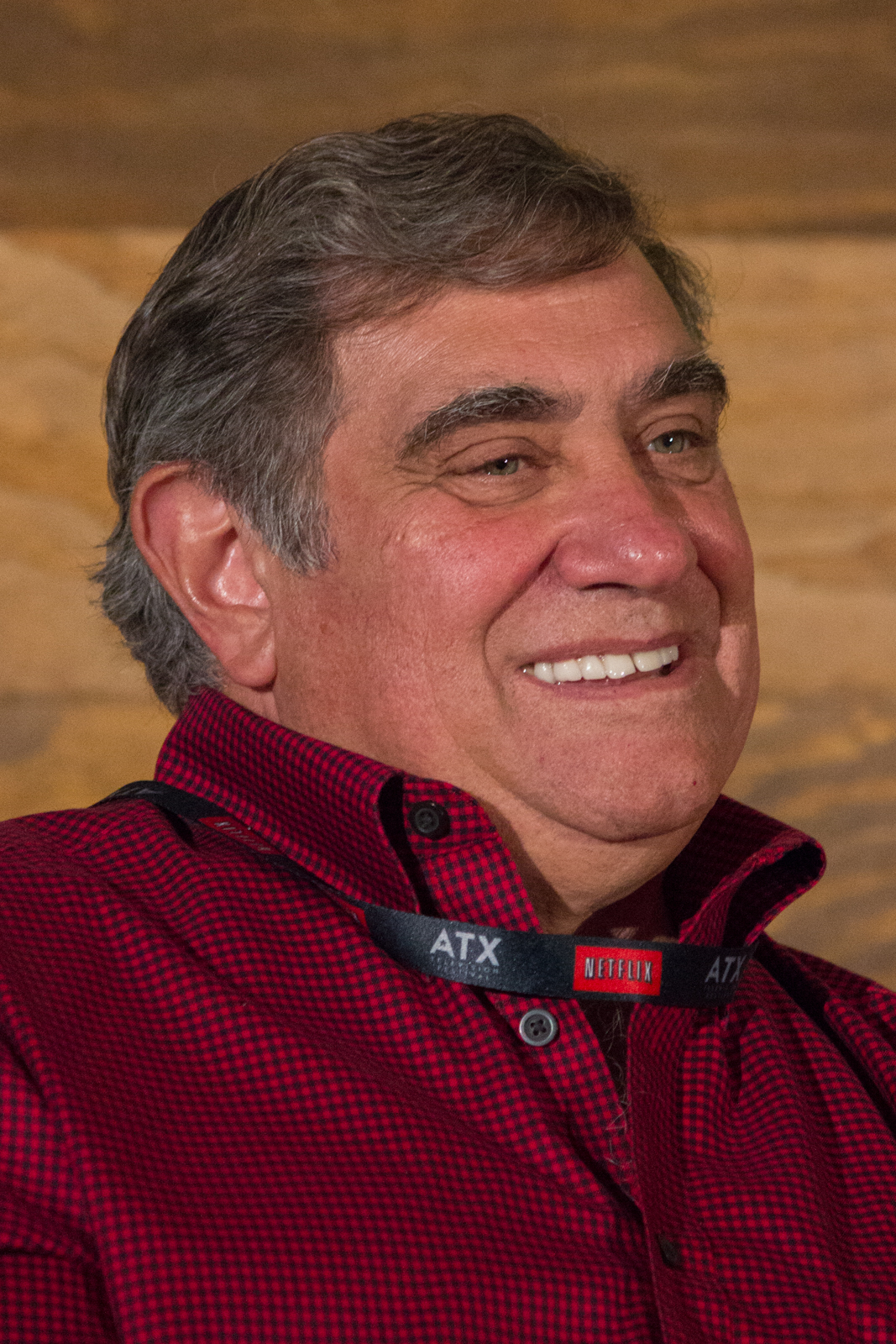
Dan Lauria

Mili Avital guest stars as Lenore Abrigaille, the schizophrenic daughter of Nichols' old friend, Palmer (Tom Bloom), who is discovered murdered, seemingly from a sword duel with a blackmailing art dealer, Dylan Weld (Kyle Fabel). The motive for the crime centers on a "Palimpsest" of The Lost Licinianus for which everyone is searching the estate. Erik Jensen plays the mysterious caretaker, Richard Celeste. Brennan Brown plays Palmer's scheming nephew Merrill, who is executor for the estate. Family friends include Bernard (Louis Cancelmi) and Regina (Geraldine Hughes). Melanie Gray portrays an unnamed woman who is Nicols' friend in London, to whom Nichols relates the story in flashback.

An "Inhumane Society" pits boxers and pit-bulls against one another as Dan Lauria plays "Sal" Salvatore Biaggi, a former boxing champion turned coach, and Michael B. Jordan plays his new prospect Danny "The D-Train" Ford. Danny's friends from "The Top Dog Crew" want to drag him back to the dog pen, but "Little" Ron Jordan (Nicoye Banks) turns up dead in the back yard of dog breeder Louis Marciano, in a special guest appearance by Ralph Macchio. Soon afterwards another crewman, Austin Darvis (Chris Chalk) is beaten to death. Xosha Roquemore plays Trina Smith, Ron's girlfriend, and Shirley Rumierk plays an ADA named Brianna.

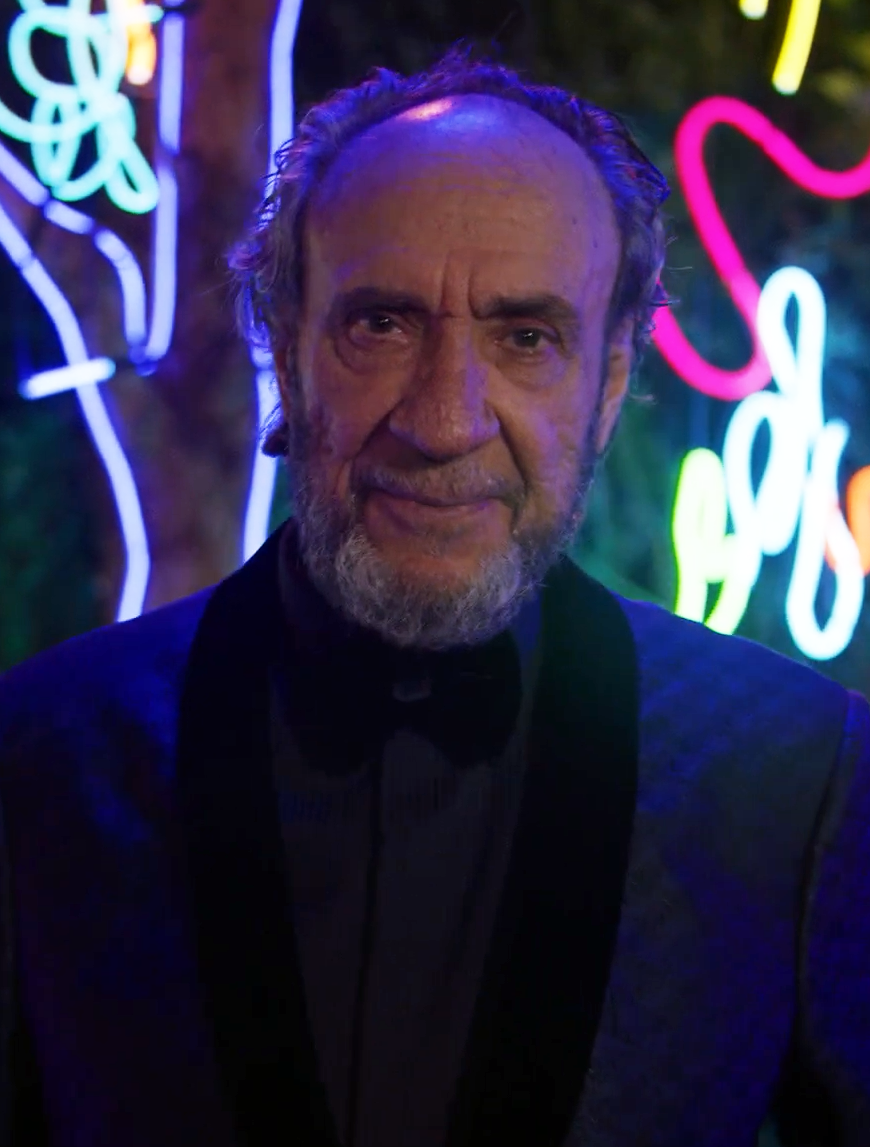
F. Murray Abraham

Tom Lipinski performs a "Three-in-One" role, alternately as Dr. Maynard Curtis, a painter Andy Quinn, and a five-year-old child named Tommy. When successful realtor Hidegard Glaser (Joanne Baron) is found dead, ME Rogers and Dets. Nichols and Stevens are puzzled about multiple forensic conclusions that seem to point to more than one suspect. Nichols, as the son of a psychologist, recognizes they might be dealing with someone with dissociative identity disorder. Psych Consultant Dr. Michael Sanderson (Curt Bouril) disagrees, so Nichols enlists the help of his father, Dr. Theodore Nichols, in a special guest star performance by F. Murray Abraham. When Terry Myers (Kate Nowlin) a teacher at the Caravaggio School goes missing, Zach and his father must overcome their family feud, and different approaches to interviewing (interrogation versus therapy) to find Terry before she dies. Robert Stanton plays Mr. Nower, an official at the Caravaggio School.

== Episodes ==
No. overall	No. in season	Title	Directed by	Written by	USA air date	NBC air date	Prod. code	U.S. viewers (millions)
172	1	"Loyalty (Part 1)" "Puntland"	Jean de Segonzac	Walon Green	March 30, 2010	August 15, 2010	09001	3.56
Arms dealer Taras Broidy (Ramsey Faragallah), head of Damacles Security, leads a heavily armed boatload of wealthy tourists off the coast of Somalia to target suspected African pirate vessels. However they open fire and destroy an unarmed boat, killing a sheikh and his wife. Back in Manhattan, news of the sheikh's death reaches two of his children, Sayid Abdullah Hassan (Ato Essandoh) and his sister Kadra (Condola Rashad). Meanwhile, Roy Lofton (David Pittu) of Damacles Security attempts to recruit Captain Danny Ross to work for a proposed private police force under their control in the Horn of Africa. After a night of celebration, Broidy and his mistress Marya (Ewa Da Cruz) are assassinated in his car under the Brooklyn Bridge and the scarf of the murdered sheik’s wife is draped over her. Goren and Eames begin an investigation into the deaths, but are prevented from pursuing the case by Ross who says the FBI has jurisdiction. When Lofton and Broidy's partner, Jan Van Dekker (John Sharian), see Ross talking to FBI agent Wendy Stahl (Amy Landecker), Ross is also killed by Hassan's assassin (Babs Olusanmokun). Major Case detectives Goren, Eames and Nichols begin their own clandestine investigation into the case assisted by Lt. Stanley Maas (David Zayas). Lofton is also executed by Hassan's assassin and Wendy Stahl takes Van Dekker into FBI custody.: Last appearance of Eric Bogosian as Capt. Daniel Ross.
173	2	"Loyalty (Part 2)" "Artifice"	Jean de Segonzac	Barbara Hall	April 6, 2010	June 20, 2010	09002	3.47
Goren intentionally has himself suspended so he can work on Ross' murder unhindered and Detective Serena Stevens (Saffron Burrows) joins the Major Case Squad. When electronics expert, R.J. Patel (Sean T. Krishnan), informs Hassan that GPS tracking devices have been planted by the FBI in the weapons supplied by Van Dekker, Hassan has his assassin kill Van Dekker. Goren traces financial payments by Damacles to investment capitalist Russell Milgram (Allen McCullough) while Stevens links Hassan to the FBI case and his father's murder as part of his bid to form a new West African country. Goren finds Milgram and forces him to divulge the location of the weapons. He then tracks down Patel but when he discovers he is working for the Stahl, Goren offers to help the FBI and avenge Ross' murder. Back in the office, the Chief of Detectives appoints Eames as Ross' temporary replacement. meanwhile, Hassan's non-muslim American girlfriend Jill Peak (Jicky Schnee) is found shot dead. When Nichols provides evidence to link Hassan to the death of his father it provokes his sister Kadra into confessing to Jill's murder, however she also implicates Hassan in the other murders. With Hassan in custody, Goren convinces Eames and Nichols to reluctantly honor Ross' death by allowing the FBI plan to proceed which includes the release of Hassan. In the last scene, Eames unwillingly fires Goren as required, then quits the NYPD.: Last appearance of Vincent D'Onofrio and Kathryn Erbe in season 9.
174	3	"Broad Channel"	Omar Madha	Mark Malone	April 13, 2010	June 27, 2010	09003	3.21
In the island community of Broad Channel in Queens county, Det. Ryan Fields is murdered following a raid on Russian mobster Valeyev. Nichols and Stevens (Saffron Burrows ) are called in to investigate but become involved in a turf war with local officer Det. Atwater (Adam Trese) and begin to suspect that Fields, and possibly Atwater, are dirty. MCS Capt. Callas requests Atwater's file from IAB Capt. Charles Galloway and finds that Atwater is under investigation. Local youth, Eddie Boyle (Thomas McDonell) is suspected of killing Fields, but Atwater shoots him dead before other police arrive. Nichols and Stevens approach local crime boss Jackie Dooley (Kevin Conway) for information as who was formerly involved with Eddie's mother, Moira Boyle (Marin Hinkle). Dooley intimates that Atwater was trying to take over Fields' operation and provides enough information to bring about his arrest.: First appearance of Mary Elizabeth Mastrantonio as Capt. Zoe Callas.
175	4	"Delicate"	Tom DiCillo	Nicole Mirante-Matthews	April 20, 2010	June 27, 2010	09006	3.53
Nichols and Stevens investigate the murder of leading ballerina Alona Landau (Lindsey Sinclair) at The Schuman school of the arts. Suspects initially include her jealous boyfriend Cole Mulgrave (Samuel Smith) and the ballet department head and her lover Ethan Johns (Lorenzo Pisoni) but they both have alibis. The detectives then focus on rival students at the school, Paulette Bartol (Vivien Cardone) and Jessalyn Kerr (Melissa Benoist) who are close friends. Nichols and Stevens manage to prove that Bartol killed Landau so that she could cement her close relationship with Kerr.
176	5	"Gods & Insects"	Jonathan Herron	Ted Sullivan	April 27, 2010	July 4, 2010	09007	2.82
A headless torso is found at the bottom of a storm drain which is later identified as the body of Kevin Denaburg (Reginald Veneziano) who worked for tabloid mogul Eli Gold (Arian Moayed). Detectives Nichols and Stevens discover that Denaburg's girlfriend, Amber Donelli (Bree Williamson), works as a "party girl" at high class escort for corporate events and she had given him embarrassing information about a wealthy and powerful CEO Nathan Grayson. Evidence points to one of Grayson's employees and former military service comrade in Iraq, David Novak (Jim True-Frost) who may have dismembered the body. However, further investigation leads to Grayson being the murderer who exploited Novak's loyalty to cover up the murder, and they use his hubris to trick him into a confession.
177	6	"Abel & Willing"	Kevin Bray	Michael Angeli	May 4, 2010	July 10, 2010	09008	2.82
During an evening waterside stroll with his wife Linda (Nadia Bowers), Ted Stoddard (Derek Cecil) is abducted after he returns to their car and finds his wife missing. Later, Ted finds himself in the woods wearing a hospital gown saying that he may have killed his wife. Meanwhile, Linda's body is discovered, shot through the heart. Stoddard is apprehended trying to leave the country but Nichols and Stevens are perplexed by both his story and lack of motive. They discover three similar cases over 4 years and focus on a social worker, Dr. Abel Hazard (Dallas Roberts) whose father and grandfather were survivors of the Holocaust and victims of a Nazi social experiment on people's choices for survival. Nichols tracks down Hazard's remote laboratory where he conducted similar experiments to test the limits of human nature and arrests him.: Inspired by the Milgram experiment conducted by psychologist Stanley Milgram.
178	7	"Love Sick"	Jim Hayman	Nicole Mirante-Matthews	May 11, 2010	July 11, 2010	09011	3.02
Rachel, a young girl from the Midwest who moved to NYC, is found dead in the street dressed like a prostitute after visiting a community medical center to receive treatment after an assault. Nurse's aid at the center, Maya Sills (Caroline Dhavernas), took Rachel home and then takes another girl, Isabel Felix (Natalie Kuhn) who also is found dead, dressed in a similar way. Maya is shown to have a borderline personality disorder, and engages in sexual fantasies with her fireman boyfriend Damon Kerrigan (Dash Mihok), committing the assaults and murders. Nichols and Stevens enlist Maya's traumatized former friend, Janine Lutz (Cheryl Lynn Bowers) to catch Kerrigan, but they have no evidence to link Maya to the murders. It is only during an interview that Maya admits that she saw the victims as prey in the same way as when as a child, she used to go hunting deer with her father.
179	8	"Love on Ice"	Ken Girotti	David Klass & James Sadwith	May 18, 2010	July 17, 2010	09009	2.55
In a flashback to twenty-two years ago, four teenage students hound a fellow student, Tom Reynolds (Tom Reynolds), into the freezing river at night and after he drowns, they lie about the circumstances of his death. The incident becomes a lifelong burden and forges a bond of silence between them. After a late night meeting of the now four adults, one of them, the former professional baseball Bailey O'Doyle, (Joshua Burrow), is bludgeoned to death with a baseball bat near his home. The other three, John Silversti (William Mapother), now dean of a prestigious boys' school, Chris Denardi (Josh Stamberg) a heart surgeon and Greg Foster (Karl Bury) a car dealer, were being blackmailed by O'Doyle who was in financial difficulties due to a gambling problem. Nichols and Stevens investigate O'Doyle’s death and link it to the cover-up of Reynolds' drowning. However, they uncover that it was O'Doyle's wife, Lani (Tina Benko), who killed him after years of frustration at his post-baseball career failures and gambling addiction.
180	9	"Traffic"	Chris Zalla	Antoinette Stella	May 25, 2010	July 18, 2010	09012	2.86
Publisher Connor James (John Bolger) is beaten to death in his home after the 50th anniversary party for his magazine. Art Director, Frank Bolinger (Ian Kahn) is arrested for the murder, but he is killed by a Russian mobster while incarcerated. Nichols and Stevens learn that James was a sex addict who used Bolinger to source young prostitutes for him from the Russian mob and that he was currently having a relationship with Mia Caruso, the daughter of his ambitious successor Patricia Caruso (Tracy Pollan) who was writing articles about the Russians. While being interviewed, Patricia infers that Mia killed James, but her ex-husband, defense attorney Forrest Caruso (Bill Sage) says Patricia struck James first and he finished him off. However, forensic evidence indicates that James died from Patricia’s first blow and she is arrested for his murder.
181	10	"Disciple"	Christine Moore	Walon Green & Michael Angeli	June 1, 2010	July 24, 2010	09010	3.08
Detective Stevens and her Chicago PD mentor, Marcus Feingold (Paul Calderon), attend an Illinois execution of confessed serial killer, Elvis Howell (Chance Kelly) whom they helped convict. He claims he did not kill the last victim, Courtney Gunderson for which he was convicted, and that her killer is still "out there". Back in New York, Diego Caldez is found shot and evidence leads Nichols and Stevens to two other victims, sex workers Maricela Fernandez (Shoshanna Withers) and Rae Ann Farmer (Anne Fidler), and forensics indicate copycat crimes by a possible "disciple" of Howell. Stevens returns to Chicago to interview Reverend Shelby Redding (Reathel Bean) about Howell's last request, and discovers the reverend passed along a letter for Howell. The detectives locate the recipient Dale Grisco (Ryan O'Nan) who admits to the recent murders, but he also reveals that Howell killed Courtney Gunderson when he could not bring himself to do it.: Lorraine Bracco makes a special guest appearance as the matron of the Dolores House foster home.
182	11	"Lost Children of the Blood"	John David Coles	Christine Bailey	June 8, 2010	July 25, 2010	09004	2.97
College student, Sarah Price (Maïté Alina), an East Side College girl and disciple of Jung, dies as the result of exsanguination. Nichols and Stevens question Sarah's drop-out boyfriend, Kyle Wyler (Christopher Abbott) and a wealthy married woman Michelle Linden (Alysia Reiner) which leads them to a vampiric cult whose belief in immortality is based on the consumption of human blood by its apparent leader and ex-convict Jeremy Parks, AKA Anton Lebrun (Clayne Crawford). However, they find that Lebrun is merely the dupe of Virgil, AKA Jonathan Parish (Matt Burns), a manipulative mortician with psychopathic behavior which Nichols attributes to him being raised by his mother who worked in an abattoir. When Virgil frames Parks for Sarah's murder, Parks assists the detectives to bring Virgil to justice.: Also stars Rick Holmes as the college professor, and Dan Butler as Sarah's father, Ohio Congressman Price.
183	12	"True Legacy"	Yon Motskin	Antoinette Stella	June 15, 2010	July 31, 2010	09013	3.50
Detectives Nichols and Stevens investigate a professional hit on food franchise owner Ryan Foley (Mick Dempsey) who is found dead in the boot of his car. They find that he was having an affair with Angela Caldera (Holley Fain) who is married to Rick Caldera (James Martinez), the son of New York Senator Victor Caldera and Marta Castillo-Caldera (Laura Harring). As the detectives investigate the family, they uncover that Rick's parents knew about the affair, but also that the senator was the father of Angela's son. They speculate that Marta had manipulated the situation so that she would have a grandson, and arranged for her brother, Hernando Castillo, AKA Tio Nando (Ramon Camín) to kill Foley. The detectives convince Rick to help them obtain enough evidence to charge Marta and Hernando for Ryan's murder.
184	13	"The Mobster Will See You Now"	Jean de Segonzac	Michael Angeli	June 22, 2010	August 1, 2010	09015	4.40
Les Tarney, an Associate-Inspector General with the US HHS is found dead after apparently choking to death. Nichols and Stevens suspect that he was murdered, possibly by his girlfriend (Sara DeRosa). The impatient Bureau Chief of Trial Division ADA Roydell Getty (Nick Sandow) has her charged against the wishes of detectives Nichols and Stevens. When his girlfriend apparently commits suicide on her release, the detectives investigate further and find that Tarney was blackmailing two doctors, Joel Silverstern (Daniel London) and Shelly Springe (Kelly AuCoin), who had bought a hospital and were upcoding their clients. Additionally, their financial backers were retired Italian mobsters; Dominic "Dom" Fabrigazzi Jr. (Lenny Venito), Anthony "Blev" Blevvins (Vincent Curatola), and Theodore "Cubby" Viviano (Peter Appel). The deal had been set up by Henry Di Piano (Adam Rothenberg), son of mobster Magglio "Mag" Di Piano (Joseph Siravo) who is currently in Prison. Nichols risks suspension by promising Piano that his ailing mentor, Fabrigazzi, will not go to jail if he owns up and confesses to Killing Tarney to protect his investment. Cathy Moriarty guest stars as Annie Gentillo.
185	14	"Palimpsest"	Darnell Martin	Mark Malone	June 29, 2010	August 7, 2010	09014	2.79
Nichols discovers that his old friend Palmer Abrigaille (Tom Bloom) has been slain, apparently from a sword duel with art dealer Dylan Weld (Kyle Fabel) who is also dead. However, Dr. Elizabeth Rodgers concludes they both were bludgeoned to death before being stabbed. Nichols and Stevens investigate the possible motive, which may be related to a fabled palimpsest manuscript, The Lost Licinianus, that dates back to the time of Christ. The case is complicated by Nichols' friendship with Palmer's schizophrenic daughter Lenore (Mili Avital) who was Nichols' first love. Possible suspects include Lenore, Palmer's scheming nephew Merrill (Brennan Brown), servant Richard Celeste (Erik Jensen) and family friends and antiquarians, Bernard (Louis Cancelmi) and Regina (Geraldine Hughes). It is when Nichols discovers that Celeste is secretly a priest in a sect called "the Conclave" that he becomes the prime suspect and eventually leads to his arrest. The story is related by Nichols in flashback to an unnamed woman friend (Melanie Gray) in London.
186	15	"Inhumane Society"	Michael Smith	Courtney Parker & Geoffrey Thorne	July 6, 2010	August 14, 2010	09005	2.99
A young boxer Danny Ford (Michael B. Jordan) is released from prison after serving time for participating in a dog-fighting ring and reunites with his old trainer Sal Biaggi (Dan Lauria), an ex-champ. He becomes a suspect when Ron Jordan (Nicoye Banks) from his old dog-fighting crew is thrown into a dog pen and savaged to death. When another former associate Austin Darvis (Chris Chalk) is found dead after a series of body blows, detectives suspect and arrest Biaggi whose reputation was riding on Danny's promising boxing career.
187	16	"Three-In-One"	Arthur W. Forney	Walon Green & David Klass	July 6, 2010	August 21, 2010	09016	2.99
The body of successful real estate agent Hildy Glazer (Joanne Baron) is discovered in the basement of an empty building. The odd assortment of clues such as a painter's truck which was spotted at the scene of the abduction belonging to a man named Andy Quinn (Tom Lipinski) point Nichols and Stevens in several different directions. When three people appear to be related to the victim, Tommy Quin, Andy Quinn and Dr. Curtis, Nichols develops a theory that these three seemingly unrelated people are connected. To prove his theory, he's forced to consult with the most unlikely expert, his father Doctor Theodore Nichols (F. Murray Abraham). His theory proves correct and under questioning they ascertain that Quinn is suffering from a Split personality disorder and the police manage to save Quinn's potential second victim.: Last appearances of Jeff Goldblum, Saffron Burrows, and Mary Elizabeth Mastrantonio.

Preceded by Season Eight	List of Law & Order: Criminal Intent episodes	Succeeded by Season Ten
