= Frank Prinzi =

American cinematographer and director

- Education: New York University
- Occupations: Cinematographer; director

Frank Prinzi is an American cinematographer and director. He earned his degree from New York University.

== Selected cinematography credits ==
- The Brother from Another Planet (1984)
- Stranger Than Paradise (1984)
- Day of the Dead (1985)
- Krush Groove (1985)
- She's Gotta Have It (1986)
- Sleepwalk (1986)
- The Fig Tree (1987)
- A Better Tomorrow II (1987)
- School Daze (1988)
- The Prince of Pennsylvania (1988)
- The Suicide Club (1988)
- The Appointments of Dennis Jennings (1988)
- Do the Right Thing (1989)
- Night of the Living Dead (1990)
- Pledge Night (1990)
- Jungle Fever (1991)
- Living in Oblivion (1995)
- Tad (1995)
- Sex and the Other Man (1995)
- The Grave (1996)
- She's the One (1996)
- Stolen Women: Captured Hearts (1997)
- The Ice Storm (1997)
- The Real Blonde (1997)
- Firehouse (1997)
- Half Baked (1998)
- No Looking Back (1998)
- Witness to the Mob (1998)
- The Best Man (1999)
- 200 Cigarettes (1999)
- Chinese Coffee (2000)
- The David Cassidy Story (2000)
- Sidewalks of New York (2001)
- Five Minutes, Mr. Welles (2005)
- Law & Order: Criminal Intent – 56 episodes (2001–2006)
- Trumbo (2007)
- Cashmere Mafia – 20 episodes (2008)
- Life on Mars – 20 episodes (2008–2009)
- Mercy – 9 episodes (2009)
- The Lost Valentine (2011)
- Firelight (2012)
- Wish You Well (2013)
- Red Zone (2014)
- An Interview with God (2018)
- Hot Air (2018)

== Directing credits ==
- Northern Exposure (2 episodes, 1991–93)
- Law & Order: Criminal Intent (34 episodes, 2001–06)
- Last Week Tonight with John Oliver (4 episodes, 2014–2016)
