= Marlane Meyer =

American television producer and writer

Marlane Meyer (born 1951) is a television producer, television writer and playwright. She was a recipient of the Susan Smith Blackburn Prize.

== Filmography ==
- Law & Order: Criminal Intent (as Marlane Gomard Meyer)
- Paris enquêtes criminelles' (as Marlane Gomard Meyer)
- CSI: Crime Scene Investigation
- Hyperion Bay
- Now and Again
- Sirens
- Prison Stories: Women on the Inside
- Nothing Sacred

== Publications ==
- Etta Jenks
- Kingfish
- The Chemistry of Change
- The Geography of Luck
- Moe's Lucky Seven in Plays From Playwrights Horizons, Broadway Play Publishing Inc.
