= Frame (Law & Order: Criminal Intent) =

- Law & Order: Criminal Intent episode
- Episode no.: Season 7 Episode 22
- Directed by: Norberto Barba
- Story by: Warren Leight
- Teleplay by: Julie Martin; Kate Rorick
- Production code: 07022
- Original air date: August 24, 2008
- Running time: 45 minutes

Guest appearances
- Olivia d'Abo as Nicole Wallace; Tony Goldwyn as Frank Goren; Leslie Hendrix as Chief M.E. Elizabeth Rodgers; John Glover as Dr. Declan Gage

Episode chronology
← Previous "Last Rites"	Next → "Playing Dead"
- Law & Order: Criminal Intent season 8

"Frame" is the 22nd episode and season finale of the seventh season of the police procedural television series Law & Order: Criminal Intent, and the 155th episode overall. It originally aired on USA Network in the United States on Sunday, August 24, 2008. In this episode, a case hits close to home for Detective Goren (Vincent D'Onofrio) when his brother's (Tony Goldwyn) apparent drug-related suicide turns out to be a murder, caused by his nemesis, Nicole Wallace (Olivia d'Abo).

The episode was written by showrunner/executive producer Warren Leight (story), Julie Martin (teleplay), and Kate Rorick (teleplay) and was directed by Norberto Barba. The episode features brief guest appearances from Tony Goldwyn and Olivia d'Abo, who reprise their roles of Detective Goren's brother Frank, and Goren's long-time nemesis Nicole Wallace, respectively; "Frame" also was their final episode of the series, along with John Glover, who portrayed Detective Goren's mentor, Dr. Declan Gage. "Frame" also marks the final episode of Criminal Intent being run by Warren Leight, who chose not to return to the series for its eighth season.

According to the Nielsen ratings, the episode's original broadcast was watched by 5.20 million total viewers, making it the most watched original episode of LOCI on USA Network, the next closest episode to score that many viewers being the season ten premiere episode "Rispetto".

== Plot ==
In the Season 7 finale, Detective Goren brings flowers to his mother's grave and finds an old framed picture of him and his older brother Frank. When Frank is found murdered the following day, the victim of a poisoning meant to look like an overdose, Goren deduces that his nemesis Nicole Wallace killed his brother.

Soon afterward, Goren's mentor, Dr. Declan Gage, is also found to have been poisoned (but alive); subsequently, Bobby Goren and Eames are led on an interstate scavenger hunt, which leads them to Wallace's former stepdaughter, Gwen Chapel, in Arizona — who is now dying of cancer, which is believed to be the factor that triggered Wallace's recent actions — and ends at a hotel where they find a box with Goren's nephew Donny's name on it, containing a fresh human heart. Although Goren believes that Wallace murdered Donny to torment him, M.E. Rodgers confirms that it is in fact Wallace's heart in the box. Goren refuses to believe this, stating that Wallace has "nine lives". Gage suggests to Goren that Wallace had a partner who acted on her wishes, and that they were trying to frame Goren for her murder and Frank’s. The captain orders a secret investigation of Goren (in case he is the actual perpetrator), which Eames only agrees to as a means to exonerate Goren. Later evidence turns up that Frank Goren had a life insurance policy naming William Brady (Goren's undercover alias) as his beneficiary, supporting Gage's theory. At this time, Goren reveals that he has confirmed that serial killer Mark Ford Brady was his biological father.

In a twist ending, it is revealed that Dr. Gage engineered this entire chain of events as an elaborate plan to "free" Goren from all of the negative people in Goren's troubled past—people who had created the metaphorical demons that have increasingly tortured Goren throughout his life. Goren realizes this after he notices someone has tried to "cut and part the pieces of (his) life together" throughout the case. He learns that Gage wrote a book on female serial killers (such as his daughter Jo, who, as it turns out, was in a coma after biting off her tongue, just before her father wanted to meet with her, an event which triggered Declan´s actions) to attract Wallace's attention.

Knowing that she would try to seduce him, Gage spurned her advances to trick her into trusting him. Gage suggested to her that he also hates Bobby, to manipulate her into killing Frank. Knowing that Wallace's next move would be to kill him, Gage killed Wallace, cut out her heart, mailed some flowers in her name (aside from the ones she herself mailed to Goren), and faked his own poisoning to set the scavenger hunt in motion. Gage thought that Frank was "going down anyway", and that such people in Bobby's life — including Gage himself — were "dead weight" that would inevitably cause Bobby to completely self-destruct (since Goren felt too responsible for them to voluntarily shut them out of his life). In Gage's twisted view, he did this to give "the son he never had" (but always wanted) a "clean slate": a fair chance at having a healthy, happy life, free of emotional baggage. Gage assures Goren that his nephew Donny is unharmed and still missing, as killing him would never have served his goal of "helping" Goren.

Gage also tells Goren that Wallace's final words were "Tell Bobby he's the only man I ever loved" while Goren looks at Gage with horror and shock.

== Cast ==
Vincent D'Onofrio	Det. Robert Goren
Kathryn Erbe	Det. Alexandra Eames
Eric Bogosian	Capt. Danny Ross

== Production ==
"Frame" was filmed between July 11 and 22, 2008 and was written by show runner/executive producer Warren Leight (story), co-executive producer Julie Martin (teleplay), and Kate Rorick (teleplay); and it was directed by Norberto Barba. "Frame" marks the last episode of Law & Order: Criminal Intent for Warren Leight, who chose to leave the series at the end of the season to join HBO's In Treatment. However, Leight wrote one of the final episodes in season ten ("Trophy Wine"). Julie Martin left the series as well after "Frame", and returned in season ten to write three episodes ("Cadaver", "Icarus", and "To the Boy in the Blue Knit Cap"). "Frame" is the first season finale since season four's "False-Hearted Judges", that Vincent D'Onofrio and Kathryn Erbe were the lead actors.

Tony Goldwyn, Olivia d'Abo, and John Glover reprised their roles of Frank Goren, Nicole Wallace, and Dr. Declan Gage for "Frame", respectively. Archive footage and scenes from episodes "Anti-Thesis", "A Person of Interest", "Grow", "Endgame", and "Untethered" are used as brief flashback scenes in the episode, Courtney B. Vance in his role of Assistant District Attorney Ron Carver was seen in one flashback with Nicole Wallace. Daniel London (Mark Bailey, "Anti-Thesis") and James McCaffrey (Daniel Croydon, "A Person of Interest") were also seen as well at the moments where their characters died by the hands of Nicole Wallace. Wallace (d'Abo) herself only appears in two brief scenes in "Frame," before the opening credits in brief flashes with her face concealed, and in the flower shop mailing flowers to Goren. In contrast to previous episodes featuring her, the focus is shifted towards Goren and his personal problems, and Wallace's role in the crime is more of an extension of this theme.

In "Frame's" original airing, this episode was dedicated to Harry Darrow, who was an art director with the show from 2001-2007 before the series moved to USA Network. Darrow died of lung cancer on December 30, 2007.

== Reception ==
=== Critical response ===
Days prior to "Frame's" original airing on USA Network, E! Online's Kristin Dos Santos said of the episode, "[...]it does, however, deliver a series of astonishing shocks not unlike the ones you would receive if you repeatedly drove your car into a power transformer." Santos went on to conclude, "it ties together a ton of long-running storylines, it's totally bizarre, and it's completely captivating."

Vanity Fair's James Wolcott started his review of LOCI: "Frame" with "The dramatic peak of Sunday night's viewing wasn't the submersive emotions dulled from rusty disuse on Mad Men (which more and more seems like a simulation exercise) but the phenomenal season-end arc climax on Law & Order: Criminal Intent" Wolcott spoke highly of the final interrogation scene between Goren and Gage, "The psychic clash of Goren's sunken-vessel misery and Glover's glinty-eyed dementia against the bluish confines of the interrogation room elevated the series to an existential plane without losing the edge of glee that comes from actors seizing the electric moment."

=== Ratings ===
In its original American broadcast on August 24, 2008, "Frame" was viewed by 5.20 million viewers. "Frame" is the most watched original episode of Law & Order: Criminal Intent on USA Network, followed by "Rispetto" on May 1, 2011, which had approx. 0.10 million less viewers than "Frame".
