= Mike Logan (Law & Order) =

Character in the Law & Order TV series franchise

Det. Mike Logan
- Law & Order franchise (Law & Order and Law & Order: Criminal Intent) character
- First appearance: Season one (Law & Order): "Prescription for Death"; Season four (CI): "Stress Position"
- Last appearance: Season five (Law & Order): "Pride"; Season seven (Law & Order: CI): "Last Rites"
- Portrayed by: Chris Noth
- Voiced by: Kid Beyond (Law & Order: Legacies)

In-universe information
- Nicknames: Mike; Mikey (by Phil Cerreta, Don Cragen, Tony Profaci, and occasionally Lennie Briscoe)
- Title(s): NYPD Detective (L&O); Senior Detective (CI)
- Occupation: Police officer
- Family: Unnamed father (deceased); Unnamed mother (deceased); Dave (cousin)
- Partner: L&O; Max Greevey; Phil Cerreta; Lennie Briscoe; Exiled; Tony Boyer; Frankie Silvera; L&O: CI; Carolyn Barek; Megan Wheeler; Nola Falacci
- Seasons: 1, 2, 3, 4, 5 (L&O); 4, 5, 6, 7 (CI)

Michael Logan is a fictional character in the police procedural and legal drama television series Law & Order franchise, played by Chris Noth. He appears in 148 episodes of the franchise (111 episodes of Law & Order and 36 episodes of Law & Order: Criminal Intent) as well as in one episode of Homicide: Life on the Street. He also appeared in Exiled: A Law & Order Movie.

== History in the franchise ==
Logan initially appeared on Law & Order from the show's pilot episode. He appeared in every episode beginning with the first season in 1990 until Noth's dismissal from the series in 1995. After appearing in the franchise telemovie Exiled, the character then guest-starred in the Law & Order: Criminal Intent season-four episode "Stress Position". Logan subsequently became a regular on Criminal Intent, starting with the first episode of season five, "Grow", which originally aired on September 25, 2005. Logan then left the series in the 21st episode of season seven, "Last Rites", which originally aired on August 17, 2008.

== Character development ==
=== Law & Order ===
Mike Logan was born in 1958 in New York City's Lower East Side into a working-class Irish-Catholic family. His father was also a police officer. He spent 10 years attending Our Lady of Mercy, where he was often in trouble and sent to see the guidance counselor. Little is revealed about his extended family, though he has mentioned a cousin named Dave, and has also stated that his family crest has a griffin on it, suggesting a European maternal line distinct from that of his surname.

He is originally portrayed as a cocky, womanizing misanthrope with a short fuse, which his captain, Donald Cragen (Dann Florek), refers to as his "famous temper". Later episodes, however, reveal a more complex side to the character; gradually he is revealed to have been abused as a child, both physically (by his unstable, alcoholic mother) and sexually (by his parish priest, whom he later confronts and brings to justice). These early traumas lead to his cynical view of the church; he quips in one episode, "My old lady had a rosary in her left hand while she beat the crap out of me with her right. The next time I go to church, six of my closest buddies will be carrying me." When Logan was a young man, his pregnant girlfriend had an abortion against his wishes.

Producer Dick Wolf noted of Logan that he provided this complex backstory in creating the character "for the sake of continuity in the writing" and to "provide the foundation for the conflict that drives much of the drama in the series".

In several episodes, his anger explodes. When his first partner, Max Greevey (George Dzundza), is murdered by a suspect in a racketeering case, Logan forces a confession from the murderer at gunpoint, and comes very close to killing him. The incident nearly costs Logan his job. He eventually learns to accept Greevey's death, however, with help from forensic psychiatrist Elizabeth Olivet (Carolyn McCormick). He and Olivet become close, and it is later implied that they slept together.

Logan's second partner, Phil Cerreta (Paul Sorvino), is also shot in the line of duty, but he survives and takes on a desk job. For the rest of the character's tenure on the show, Logan is partnered with Lennie Briscoe (Jerry Orbach), with whom he forms a close friendship.

When Noth was fired from the show in 1995 over a salary dispute, the Logan character was written out; in the Law & Order universe, Logan is transferred from Manhattan Homicide to the Staten Island Domestic Disputes squad in 1995 for publicly punching a homophobic politician who had been tried for the murder of a gay man (based on the Dan White case). The transfer is considered a punishment and a career dead end for Logan; McCoy refers to Logan's new assignment as "doing two-and-a-half to five in Staten Island". He is replaced by Det. Rey Curtis (Benjamin Bratt). After Noth's firing was announced, Orbach sought to have the character of Logan killed off, to provide Orbach's character with an "Emmy moment" of "a sobbing Briscoe... cradling the dead body of Mike Logan in his arms"; Wolf declined this request, thus making it possible for Logan to return as a character later in the franchise.

=== Exiled: A Law & Order Movie ===
The Logan character was revived in 1998 and given his own TV movie, Exiled: A Law & Order Movie. By the time of the movie, Logan has become a homicide detective again, but is still in Staten Island. He tries to get back to Manhattan by solving the murder of a prostitute, in the process discovering that his old friend, Detective Tony Profaci (John Fiore), is involved in the crime.

=== Law & Order: Criminal Intent ===
Mike Logan as he appears in the final scene of the episode "Last Rites": This episode aired nearly 18 years after Noth's first portrayal of the character, and this was the final appearance of the character.

In 2005, the character was added to Law & Order: Criminal Intent, a presence described as providing "the strongest link between CI and Law & Order". He was reintroduced in the fourth-season episode "Stress Position", where he helps the Major Case Squad's investigation of a case of prisoner abuse involving corrupt corrections officers who torture Arab prisoners. Detectives Robert Goren (Vincent D'Onofrio) and Alexandra Eames (Kathryn Erbe) question Logan's girlfriend, prison nurse Gina Lowe (Arija Bareikis), about prison drug testing and her interactions with a murdered corrections officer. Later, the detectives deduce that Unit Counselor Kurt Plumm (Wayne Duvall) is the ringleader and is planning to have Lowe killed to silence her.

Goren and Logan attempt to escort her to safety, but the prison goes into lockdown, trapping all three inside. Plumm and his partners corner Logan, Goren, and Lowe in a corridor. Goren convinces the other guards to defy Plumm, however, and one of the officers opens the gates to free the detectives and Lowe. Logan picks up a guard's discarded billy club and approaches Plumm menacingly, but he resists the urge to assault the man. "That guy," Logan later says to Goren, "he would have been worth another 10 years in Staten Island." Also in the episode, Captain James Deakins (Jamey Sheridan) reveals that Logan's former superior officer, Lieutenant Anita Van Buren (S. Epatha Merkerson), had tried three times to get him transferred back to her command after his reassignment, all to no avail.

Logan returns to Manhattan as a detective at the Major Case Squad in the fifth season (under Deakins' directive), promoted to senior partner with Det. Carolyn Barek (Annabella Sciorra). In the 2006 episode "To the Bone", he uses deadly force against a murder suspect, unaware that the man is an undercover police officer. He is cleared of official misconduct, but has PTSD symptoms as a result of killing a fellow officer; he reaches out to Olivet for counseling.

Logan's shooting of the undercover officer sets in motion a chain of events that eventually leads to Deakins' retirement from the NYPD. In the sixth season, the Major Case Squad is handed over to a new captain, Danny Ross (Eric Bogosian), and Logan is assigned a new partner, Det. Megan Wheeler (Julianne Nicholson).

At the end of the sixth season, while Wheeler goes on temporary assignment (due to Nicholson's first pregnancy), Logan begins dating his neighbor Holly Lauren (Kelli Williams), but she is murdered before the relationship can develop. During the investigation, Logan discovers that Lauren had a whole other life. Her name used to be Kathleen Shaw and she was running from an abusive ex-boyfriend, who becomes a person of interest in her death. When District Attorney Arthur Branch (Fred Dalton Thompson) drops charges against Lauren's ex, Julian (Alec Von Bargen), due to lack of evidence of a homicide, Logan is deeply upset.

At the start of the seventh season, he has a new partner, Detective Nola Fallaci (Alicia Witt), who is assigned to him from Brooklyn North homicide, while Wheeler is teaching American police procedures to officers in Europe.

In the episode "Last Rites", Logan goes head to head with Terri Driver (Leslie Hope), a corrupt ADA who had made her career by railroading defendants she had cause to believe were innocent. Driver, who is running for attorney general, threatens to go after Logan's job and builds a case against Wheeler's fiancé, who is arrested by the FBI for fraud and racketeering. Logan solves a 16-year-old homicide that Driver has been trying to bury and exonerates a man she unjustly sent to prison, but the inflexibility and corruption of the justice system he sees in this case leaves him angry and disenchanted. Father Chris Shea (Denis O'Hare), a priest who first alerted Logan to Driver's corruption, advises him that, after over 25 years as a cop, it is time to do something else with his life. Logan nods and walks out of the room, but his decision is not revealed until the following season, when Ross mentions to Wheeler that her partner "quit on her", referring to Logan. He is replaced by Zack Nichols (Jeff Goldblum).

=== Weapons ===
Mike Logan carries a Smith & Wesson Model 36 .38 Special caliber revolver in the original Law & Order series. In Law & Order: Criminal Intent, he still carried the Model 36 in his early appearances, but he later switches to a Glock 19 9mm semiautomatic pistol before moving to a Colt Detective Special, another .38 caliber revolver.

== Crossover appearance on Homicide: Life on the Street ==
In the precredit sequence of the 1995 Homicide: Life on the Street episode "Law & Disorder", Mike Logan hands off a prisoner (John Waters) to Baltimore Detective Frank Pembleton (Andre Braugher), while they engage in friendly banter about which city, New York or Baltimore, is better. Noth was uncredited for his appearance, but received a special thanks.

== Reception ==
Along with the rest of the cast of Law & Order, Chris Noth was nominated for a Screen Actor's Guild Award for Outstanding Performance by an Ensemble in a Drama Series in 1995 and 1996. Noth was also nominated for a Viewers for Quality Television Award for his performance as Logan in 1994.

A 2004 retrospective on the Lennie Briscoe character, aired after Orbach's death earlier that year, noted that some fans "were never able to move beyond Chris Noth's Mike Logan as Briscoe's partner", and that in adjusting to having Briscoe as his new partner, "Logan was even more gruff than Briscoe".

== Credits ==
Noth has appeared in 111 episodes in Law & Order and 36 episodes in Law & Order: Criminal Intent.

== Appearance in Law & Order ==
| Seasons | Years | Episodes | | | | | | | | | | | | | | | | | | | | | | | |
| Seasons | Years | 1 | 2 | 3 | 4 | 5 | 6 | 7 | 8 | 9 | 10 | 11 | 12 | 13 | 14 | 15 | 16 | 17 | 18 | 19 | 20 | 21 | 22 | 23 | 24 |
|---|---|---|---|---|---|---|---|---|---|---|---|---|---|---|---|---|---|---|---|---|---|---|---|---|---|
| 1 | 1990–91 | | | | | | | | | | | | | | | | | | | | | | | | |
| 2 | 1991–92 | | | | | | | | | | | | | | | | | | | | | | | | |
| 3 | 1992–93 | | | | | | | | | | | | | | | | | | | | | | | | |
| 4 | 1993–94 | | | | | | | | | | | | | | | | | | | | | | | | |
| 5 | 1994–95 | | | | | | | | | | | | | | | | | | | | | | | | |
| Seasons | Years | 1 | 2 | 3 | 4 | 5 | 6 | 7 | 8 | 9 | 10 | 11 | 12 | 13 | 14 | 15 | 16 | 17 | 18 | 19 | 20 | 21 | 22 | 23 | 24 |
| Seasons | Years | Episodes | | | | | | | | | | | | | | | | | | | | | | | |

| Regular cast |

| × | Regular cast + no appearance |

| Recurring cast |

| No credit + no appearance |

== Appearance in Law & Order: Criminal Intent ==
| Seasons | Years | Episodes | | | | | | | | | | | | | | | | | | | | | | | |
| Seasons | Years | 1 | 2 | 3 | 4 | 5 | 6 | 7 | 8 | 9 | 10 | 11 | 12 | 13 | 14 | 15 | 16 | 17 | 18 | 19 | 20 | 21 | 22 | 23 | 24 |
|---|---|---|---|---|---|---|---|---|---|---|---|---|---|---|---|---|---|---|---|---|---|---|---|---|---|
| 4 | 2004–05 | | | | | | | | | | | | | | | | | | | | | | | | |
| 5 | 2005–06 | | | | | | | | | | | | | | | | | | | | | | | | |
| 6 | 2006–07 | | | | | | | | | | | | | | | | | | | | | | | | |
| 7 | 2007–08 | | | | | | | | | | | | | | | | | | | | | | | | |
| Seasons | Years | 1 | 2 | 3 | 4 | 5 | 6 | 7 | 8 | 9 | 10 | 11 | 12 | 13 | 14 | 15 | 16 | 17 | 18 | 19 | 20 | 21 | 22 | 23 | 24 |
| Seasons | Years | Episodes | | | | | | | | | | | | | | | | | | | | | | | |

| Regular cast |

| × | Regular cast + no appearance |

| Recurring cast |

| No credit + no appearance |

== Fictional work history ==
| Squad | Borough | Division | Partner | Direct Superior |
|---|---|---|---|---|
| 27th | Manhattan | Homicide | Sgt. Max Greevey | Capt. Donald Cragen |
| 27th | Manhattan | Homicide | Sgt. Phil Cerreta | Capt. Donald Cragen |
| 27th | Manhattan | Homicide | Det. Lennie Briscoe | |
| 27th | Manhattan | Homicide | Det. Lennie Briscoe | Lt. Anita Van Buren |
| 128th | Staten Island | Domestic Dispute | Det. Tony Boyer | Lt. Kevin Stolper |
| 128th | Staten Island | Homicide | Det. Frankie Silvera | Lt. Kevin Stolper |
| 1PP | Manhattan | Major Case Squad | Det. Carolyn Barek | Capt. James Deakins |
| 1PP | Manhattan | Major Case Squad | Det. Megan Wheeler | Capt. Danny Ross |
| 1PP | Manhattan | Major Case Squad | Det. Nola Falacci | Capt. Danny Ross |
