= Law & Order: Criminal Intent season 3 =

Season of American television series

Law & Order: Criminal Intent
- Season 3
- Season 3 U.S. DVD cover
- No. of episodes: 21

Release
- Original network: NBC
- Original release: September 28, 2003 – May 23, 2004

Season chronology
- ← Previous; Season 2 Next → Season 4

The third season of Law & Order: Criminal Intent premiered in the United States on NBC on September 28, 2003 and ended May 23, 2004. The DVD was released in the United States on September 14, 2004.

== Cast ==
=== Main cast ===
- Vincent D'Onofrio as Detective Robert Goren
- Kathryn Erbe as Detective Alexandra Eames
- Jamey Sheridan as Captain James Deakins
- Courtney B. Vance as ADA Ron Carver

=== Recurring cast ===
- Samantha Buck as Detective G. Lynn Bishop. Buck temporarily replaced Det. Alexandra Eames (Kathryn Erbe) while she was on maternity leave as explained in episode 1, "Undaunted Mettle" (Kathryn did appear briefly in a few episodes until her return). Detective Bishop is introduced in episode 5, "Pravda," as the temporary partner of Det. Robert Goren (Vincent D'Onofrio). She was assigned to the Major Case Squad of the New York City Police Department (NYPD) due replace Eames and her shield number is 6141 - clearly legible in the episode titled, "F.P.S.".

Goren's unorthodox ways of solving a case was something Eames had become accustomed to. However, Bishop found Goren's methods difficult to keep up with, ultimately resulting in an often lack of chemistry between them. Goren further exacerbated the situation by making unfavorable comparisons between Bishop and Eames. Det. Bishop's final appearance was in episode 11, "Mad Hops."

=== Notable guest stars ===
- Jane Adams as Sylvia Campbell
- Guy Boyd as Burton Foche
- Jordan Bridges as Jack Cadogan
- Bobby Cannavale as Julian Bello
- Jude Ciccolella as Perry Powell
- Stephen Colbert as James Bennett
- Margaret Colin as Dr. Eloise Barnes
- Alicia Coppola as Isobel Carnicki
- Dana Eskelson as Paige Mullen
- Leo Fitzpatrick as Rickie Cozza
- Michel Gill as Spencer Anderson
- Rodney Hicks as Jerome Davis
- Judd Hirsch as Ben Elkins
- Nikki M. James as Tamara Bates
- Jason Jurman as Danny Lucci
- Theodore Raymond Knight as Neil Colby
- Olek Krupa as Ben Laurette
- Billy Lush as Conroy "Connie" Smith
- Anthony Mackie as Carl Hines
- Mark Margolis as Don Mario Damiano
- Angelica Page as Paula Connors
- Josh Pais as Dr. Ralph Friedman
- Terrance Quinn as Gordon Buchanan
- Charles Rocket as Johnny DePalma
- Bill Sage as Officer Thomas "Tommy" Callahan
- John Savage as Mark Farrell
- Terry Serpico as Earl Carnicki
- Barry Del Sherman as Brent Anderson
- Victor Slezak as Reverend Hale
- Brent Spiner as Graham Barnes
- Maria Thayer as Claire Brody
- Kevin Tighe as Dr. Edwin Lingard
- Glynn Turman as Roy Hines
- Thomas G. Waites as Lance Brody
- Delaney Williams as Ernie Dominguez

== Episodes ==
No. overall	No. in season	Title	Directed by	Written by	Original release date	Prod. code	U.S. viewers (millions)
46	1	"Undaunted Mettle"	Steve Shill	S : René Balcer; S/T : Stephanie Sengupta	September 28, 2003	E4502	15.84
Young architect, Noah Preston (Michael Hogan), is murdered and it leads Goren and Eames to an architecture design competition to replace the World Trade Center and the famous architect, Ben Laurette (Olek Krupa), whom the victim was studying. Laurette turns out to be a womanizer, married to four different women, however the available evidence points to only one suspect, young wife Meredith Breen (Jessica Hecht), who enamoured with Laurette and his legacy, and pregnant with his baby. She realized that Preston was Lurette's illegitimate son and killed him because she believed that public knowledge of his existence would ruin Laurette's career. Meanwhile, Eames announces she is pregnant with a surrogate baby for her sister.
47	2	"Gemini"	Frank Prinzi	S : René Balcer; S/T : Jim Sterling	October 5, 2003	E4503	14.29
A series of murders of retailers who provide changes in appearance, particularly optometrists, leads Goren and Eames to schizophrenic Brent Anderson (Barry Del Sherman). He is obsessed with Marilyn Monroe and has bought blue contact lenses and dyed his hair blonde. However, the detectives prove that the murders are linked to an elaborate $5 million extortion scheme on the contact lens manufactures by Brent's older brother, Spencer (Michel Gill), who has exploited his younger brother's illness.
48	3	"The Gift"	Alex Zakrzewski	S : René Balcer; S/T : Marlene Meyer	October 12, 2003	E4501	14.41
Following the murder of newspaper cameraman Clayton Webster (Lee Aron Rosen), Goren and Eames suspect that he was investigating whether his father, gallery owner Henry (Michael Nouri), was cheating on his wealthy mother, Lyz (Anne Twomey), with art dealer Octavia Ruiz (Florencia Lozano). Further investigation leads them to a Santería priest, Julian Bello (Bobby Cannavale), who interprets the exploits the partial epileptic seizures of his partner Sylvia Campbell (Jane Adams) to infer that she has a clairvoyant powers. Bello preyed on Lyz's gullibility by tricking her into believing that Sylvia had enhanced her psychic ability, for half a million dollar fee. He had Clayton killed to confirm her vision, however his ruse is exposed by the detectives.
49	4	"But Not Forgotten"	Constantine Makris	S : René Balcer; S/T : Gerry Conway	October 19, 2003	E4504	14.88
When a volunteer bookkeeper Frieda Merced (Liz Larsen) goes missing, Goren and Eames find that she was looking into the tax records of her long dead brother, Dan Feist, for his former wife, Isobel Carnicki (Alicia Coppola). Feist appears to have been a hitman working for criminal Jimmy Limone (Abraham Alvarez) who is about to be paroled. When Bennie Messina (Tim Artz), the prime suspect in Frieda's murder turns up dead, they focus on his associate, former detective and now Isobel's second husband, Earl Carnicki (Terry Serpico), as the person responsible for all the deaths.
50	5	"Pravda"	Alex Zakrzewski	S : René Balcer; S/T : Warren Leight	October 26, 2003	E4509	15.16
Detective G. Lynn Bishop (Samantha Buck) is assigned as an interim partner to Goren after Eames (Kathryn Erbe) goes on maternity leave, although she still maintains a presence in the department. Bishop joins Goren in an investigation into the murder of star reporter Carl Hines' (Anthony Mackie) girlfriend Katya Jalenak (Michal Sinnott) in their apartment. Suspicion first falls on Carl, then the newspaper publisher Ben Elkins(Judd Hirsch) and then on Carl's father Roy Hines (Glynn Turman). It is revealed that Carl was a serial plagiarist and when his journalist father Roy discovered the truth, he planned kill his son and then himself out of shame. However, when Katya awoke and found Roy in their apartment waiting for Carl, he panicked and killed her.
51	6	"Stray"	Frank Prinzi	S : René Balcer; S/T : Elizabeth Benjamin	November 2, 2003	E4511	13.50
Four men, including two undercover cops, are shot dead during a sting to buy illegal guns. Goren and Bishop pick up the trail of Jerome Davis (Rodney Hicks) a "stray" and his girlfriend Tamara Bates (Nikki M. James) who worked as a money counter. Later, an illegal money counting operation is raided and the group killed before being robbed of $400,000. When Goren and Bishop realize that someone entered via a sabotaged locked bathroom window and left via a rusted fire escape, Tamara and Jerome becomes their prime suspects. They arrest Tamara and Jerome but without enough evidence to charge them, the detectives reveal to Jerome that Tamara was about to skip out with the money and they play on Jerome's dyslexia to provoke him into implicating both himself and Tamara in the murders.
52	7	"A Murderer Among Us"	Steve Shill	S : René Balcer; S/T : Diana Son	November 9, 2003	E4512	13.18
Lena Brody (Monique Fowler), wife of Lance Brody (Thomas G. Waites) is found dead in the bathroom of her home, brutally stabbed to death. Although Lance has a history of violence, the detectives believe it is a suicide. The subsequent investigation implicates Lance in a series of murders of young Jewish men and indicates that Lance harbours resentment against Jews because his mother had an affair with a Jewish man. Goren and Bishop believe Lena knew of Lance's hatred for Jews and when she discovered she had Jewish heritage, she feared for her daughter Clair's (Maria Thayer) safety if Lance found out. Lena took her own life, hoping to expose her husband's crimes so he would go to prison thus protecting her daughter.
53	8	"Sound Bodies"	Jean de Segonzac & Frank Prinzi	René Balcer	November 16, 2003	E4513	12.54
Detectives Goren and Bishop investigate fatal poisonings in an isolated island church which also seems to be connected to the drowning deaths of three young students. The trail leads them to a Svengali-like teenage boy, Conroy "Connie" Smith (Billy Lush), who has convinced three impressionable young girls to commit the homicides on his behalf. Goren and Bishop appeal to his belief in his power over the girls to incriminate himself during questioning in custody.
54	9	"Happy Family"	Frank Prinzi	S : René Balcer; S/T : Marlene Meyer	November 23, 2003	E4508	14.21
The bludgeoning death of a rich family patriarch Russell Connors (Dennis Rees) has the Major Case Squad detectives investigating several suspects of his family and inner circle, each with their own motives: his estranged wife Paula Connors (Angelica Page) whom he was about to divorce, her male friend and parolee Eddie Malloy (Zach Galligan), their children's nanny Helen Reynolds (Anna Katarina), the victim's sister Brenda (Camilla Scott) and brother-in-law Dr. Ralph Friedman (Josh Pais). Goren and Bishop learn that Paula is dying from cancer and the Connors' two sons, Jason (Reiley McClendon) and Sam (Chris J. Kelly) were adopted from a grim orphanage in Romania. They suspect the boys feared Russell would return them to the orphanage if Paula died, leading the detectives to realize that the eldest son, Jason, had the strongest motive to kill Russell.
55	10	"F.P.S."	Darnell Martin	S : René Balcer; S/T : Gerry Conway	January 4, 2004	E4506	13.21
A female computer whiz and gamer Corinne Kennedy (Annie Burton Alvarez) is attacked in her apartment and thrown over the balcony to her death. Goren uses his own experience and also works computer technicians to investigate her death. He and Bishop investigate the world of hackers, scammers and gaming and are led to F.P.S game developers Jack Cadogan (Jordan Bridges) and Neil Colby (T.R. Knight). They eventually realize that Colby killed Corinne Kennedy because he believed that Jack was spending too much time playing against her online and Colby was incapable of completing the programming on his own. Meanwhile, Eames gives birth.
56	11	"Mad Hops"	Christopher Swartout	S : René Balcer; S/T : Jim Sterling	January 11, 2004	E4514	16.11
A private investigator Diego Bracho (José Ramón Rosario) is murdered while was tracking down the whereabouts of a promising high school basketball player, Cory Fergin. Goren and Bishop canvas the local basketball courts to discover a link to gamblers and college recruiters and learn that several talented players were transferred to the same school. While investigating the coach, Perry Powell (Jude Ciccolella), they learn that he is infatuated with Karen Watkins (Suzzanne Douglass), the mother of one of the players, Ben (Kevin Phillips), and has boosted his statistics to gain her approval. The detectives discover that Cory confronted Coach Powell about the false statistics and he killed the young basketballer to silence him.
57	12	"Unrequited"	Jean de Segonzac	S : René Balcer; S/T : Stephanie Sengupta	January 18, 2004	E4507	11.98
On an anonymous tipoff, Goren and Eames have the body of wealthy James Whitney exhumed and determine that he did not die of natural causes but was poisoned. They discover his attention-seeking widow, Marion Whitney (Claire Bloom), has begun hosting charity events with event manager, Harvey Gruenwald (Casey Siemaszko) who is having financial difficulties. When Harvey's mother, Esther Gruenwald (Rebecca Schull) is found murdered in her apartment, they investigate Harvey and find he is deeply indebted to his silent partner and loan shark, Nick Weaver (Sal Richards). Further investigation indicates that Harvey killed James Whitney and that Marion Whitney arranged for Nick Weaver to have Harvey's mother killed to prevent her exposing her son's activities.
58	13	"Pas de Deux"	Frank Prinzi	S : René Balcer; S/T : Warren Leight	February 15, 2004	E4516	13.30
A bank robber with terminal cancer, Donny DePalma (Charles Rocket, in his final acting role), enlists lonely unwitting accomplices into committing bank robberies with fake bombs strapped to their chests which may eventually replaced with real bombs which could kill them. Goren and Eames track him down through his latest accomplice and victim, Margie Timmons (Enid Graham), whom he chatted up at a dance class. When the detectives catch her and Donny in the process of preparing to stage a bank robbery which he planned as a suicide by cop, they have to convince her to give evidence against him.
59	14	"Mis-Labeled"	Joyce Chopra	S : René Balcer; S/T : Elizabeth Benjamin	February 22, 2004	E4515	14.08
The body of Clarendon Pharmaceuticals company executive, Clayton Sherwood (Darren Goldstein) Head of Sales for Southeast Asia, is found chopped in half and stuffed in his suitcase which is being shipped back to Bangkok. In Thailand, Dr. Pirapan (Pun Bandhu) was treating an 8 year old with hemophilia who subsequently became infected with HIV which he suspected was from a tainted Clarendon Factor VIII batch and passed the information to Sherwood. Executives Bernard Mailer, Steve Johannsen and Sherwood decided that instead of destroying the batch of about $15 million of contaminated human plasma-derived product, they repackaged it with green labels to appear as a safe synthetic product and exported it to Thailand without informing CEO Gordon Buchanan (Terry O'Quinn). Shepherd knew that Eric Dunlow (Daniel Sauli), Buchanan's administrative secretary, was a gay college yachtsman and tried to blackmail him into planting incriminating evidence on Buchanan’s computer to implicate him. However, Dunlow is actually Brian Welton who stole Dunlow's identity and he killed Shepherd to avoid being exposed as an imposter. Goren discovers Welton's identity theft through DNA analysis and eventually builds a strong enough case to prove Welton was the killer.
60	15	"Shrink-Wrapped"	Jean de Segonzac	Diana Son	March 7, 2004	E4510	14.99
A young musician, Christian (Gene Farber), is found stabbed to death in his recording studio with his face burned by acid. Detectives Goren and Eames find he was a patient and lover of psychiatrist Dr. Eloise Barnes (Margaret Colin), so her husband, psychologist Graham Barnes (Brent Spiner) becomes their prime suspect. However as the detectives investigate the family, their attention turns to the couple's daughter Camilla (Taylor Roberts), a victim of their narcissistic behavior including, promiscuity, mind games, competitiveness and callous indifference to her needs. In an interview where Camilla is confronted by the evidence against her and the uncaring behavior of her parents, she admits she committed the murder to exact revenge against them for years of mental abuse and neglect.
61	16	"The Saint"	Frank Prinzi	S : René Balcer; S/T : Marlene Meyer	March 14, 2004	E4517	14.62
An elderly woman who works at a rehabilitation center, Louise Politano (Phyllis Somerville), is killed by a booby trapped gift containing lye. Goren and Eames investigate her background and find that she may have faked a miraculous cure from polio in her childhood through faith in Brother Jerome, a 19th century healer who is currently being proposed for sainthood by the Brother Jerome Foundation. Investigation of supporting documents indicate that the authenticator engaged by the Foundation, James Bennett (Stephen Colbert), has been making money by forging and selling documents to the Foundation to support its case. He was motivated by revenge for the fact that over 20 years, his mother had given almost everything they owned to the Foundation. He killed Politano because she may have exposed his activities.
62	17	"Conscience"	Alex Chapple	S : René Balcer; S/T : Gerry Conway	March 28, 2004	E4519	14.40
A neurologist is found dead in a swimming pool, murdered by a combination of chemicals in her swimming gloves. Goren and Eames look at her research into whether persons in a vegetative state can communicate and are led to the situation of Laraine Farrell (Dee Pelletier), a woman with a heart condition who had heart failure while hiking with her husband Mark (John Savage) and son. Their investigations show that she stole thousands of dollars from the company where she worked and hid it in a fund, but her husband knew this and so he caused her to collapse so he could access the funds. The Major Case Squad stage an experiment at Laraine’s bedside to test if she can communicate, preying on Mark's guilt to elicit a confession from him.
63	18	"Ill-Bred"	Steve Shill	S : René Balcer; S/T : Jim Sterling	April 18, 2004	E4520	14.25
Veterinarian Molly Sims (Tari Signor) is killed in the stalls of horse racing stables owned by James (Mark Pinter) and Marguerite (Bronwen Booth) Townsend. Detectives Goren and Eames discover married stable employees Dale (Fred Weller) and Paige (Dana Eskelson) Mullen appear to be smuggling heroin in the horse's uteruses while attending domestic and international thoroughbred competitions. Further investigation uncovers that Dale is having an affair with Marguerite Townsend and that his wife Paige planned to exploit both of them by increasing the possibility of Marguerite having a child with Dale. Paige planned blackmail her employer and set up her own dream horse farm for which she has already paid a deposit without Dale's knowledge. When Goren and Eames find that Marguerite is now pregnant, they deduce that Paige was motivated to kill Sims to prevent her from exposing their drug-smuggling scheme before Marguerite gave birth.
64	19	"Fico di Capo"	Alex Zakrzewski	S : René Balcer; S/T : Stephanie Sengupta	May 9, 2004	E4518	11.64
A young witness against the Damiano crime family, Danny Lucci (Jason Jurman), is murdered in a restaurant while ostensibly under police protection. Goren and Eames first concentrate on one of the officers assigned to protect him. When his wife, an undercover officer, is outed in a newspaper column and then brutally stabbed in her apartment, Goren believes the aim was to create conflict between the police and the D.A.'s office. Meanwhile, family boss Mario Damiano (Mark Margolis) is in a hospice dying of lung cancer. He is visited by Rickie "Chops" Cozza (Leo Fitzpatrick) who brings him his favorite black figs while he is neglected by his youngest wastrel son Mikey. Goren deduces that Rickie's behavior is aimed at trying to work his way up in the Damiano family with the assistance of his associate Louis Versini (Austin Basis) who took part in the officer's stabbing. Rickie persuades Mario to approve his son's killing, but it is a trap by Mario for Mikey to kill Rickie instead. Fortunately, they are interrupted by the arrival of the Major Case Squad and Goren goads Rickie into admitting his guilt.
65	20	"D.A.W."	Frank Prinzi	S : René Balcer; S/T : Warren Leight	May 16, 2004	E4522	13.74
A woman, Danielle Pearce (Keisha Alfred) is killed in a hit-and-run incident but detectives Goren and Eames believe that she was drugged and forced into the road where she would be hit by passing cars. As they examine the background to her death, they are led to Dr. Lindgard (Kevin Tighe) who signed Danielle's mother's death certificate and facilitated a speedy cremation. Further investigation leads to a pattern in the doctor's behavior and involvement in signing over 200 death certificates of mainly elderly women and arranged for their prepaid cremations to avoid autopsies. Digging deeper, the detectives discover Lindgard has an opiate addiction with his pharmacist ex-wife supplying the drug. Goren confronts him at a dinner party, exposing his addiction to both opiates and the need to exercise power over the life and deaths of his patients.: Inspired by Harold Shipman murders.
66	21	"Consumed"	Steve Shill	S : René Balcer; S/T : Warren Leight	May 23, 2004	E4524	13.04
Three Hispanic men are gunned down in one night by the service revolver of police officer, Tommy Callahan (Bill Sage). Tommy is found later that night on the subway tracks with a broken leg and while he is in hospital it is discovered that he sleepwalks with no recollection of his actions. Goren and Eames suspect that his condition was exploited to cover a targeted killing of his first victim, Eduardo Mercaldo (Paul Knowles). They look into Tommy's neighbor Beth Landau / Elizabeth Post (Karen Sillas) who cares for him and find that her ex-husband Bingham Post (Larry Pine ) has been in prison for six years for refusing to disclose the location of marital assets of $15 million to avoid sharing it with her. The detectives suspect that Beth discovered that Mercaldo transported money for Bingham and she killed him to stop the flow of money. When Beth and Bingham agree to reconcile, Goren and Eames visit them. Goren proposes that to exact her revenge, Beth killed Mercaldo, and the other two men, then burned the musician’s notebook with the bank account codes in the Cayman Islands to prevent Bingham from ever retrieving his money.

Preceded by Season Two	List of Law & Order: Criminal Intent episodes	Succeeded by Season Four
