= One (Law & Order: Criminal Intent) =

- Law & Order: Criminal Intent episode
- Episode no.: Season 1 Episode 1
- Directed by: Jean de Segonzac
- Story by: Dick Wolf
- Teleplay by: René Balcer
- Production code: E0901
- Original air date: September 30, 2001
- Running time: 44 minutes

Guest appearances
- Jake Weber as Karl Atwood; Michele Hicks as Gia DeLuca; Michael Aronov as Avi; Lenny Venito as Jake Nathan; Gene Canfield as Detective Cardenas; Jayce Bartok as Michael Carson; Michael P. Moran as Mr. De Santis; Louis Vanaria as Jimmy Randazzo; Stuart Burney as Mr. Kerstein; Neva Small as Mrs. Kerstein; Leslie Hendrix as Chief Medical Examiner Elizabeth Rodgers; Dianne Wiest as Interim District Attorney Nora Lewin

Episode chronology
← Previous —	Next → "Art"
- Law & Order: Criminal Intent season 1

"One" is the pilot episode of the American legal drama Law & Order: Criminal Intent, the second created spinoff of the original Law & Order series, which was created by Dick Wolf and developed and co-created veteran Law & Order writer René Balcer. The episode's story was written by Wolf, and it was directed by Balcer. The episode originally aired on NBC in the United States on Sunday, September 30, 2001; the series premiere date was pushed back due to the September 11th attacks. The episode follows Detectives Robert Goren (Vincent D'Onofrio) and Alexandra Eames (Kathryn Erbe) solving the murder of two young college students and a Canadian ex-con, which has a $300 million motive.

== Plot ==
In January 2001, Karl Atwood (Jake Weber) enlists his girlfriend Gia (Michele Hicks) and three others to help plan and execute a major jewelry heist: Carson (Jayce Bartok), fresh out of a Canadian prison; Nathan (Lenny Venito), an expert in phony identification; and a muscular Serbian named Zivkovic. The team of three trick a couple out of their home by sending them on a phony prize trip to Atlantic City, then drill through the empty house into the jewelry store next door. Unfortunately, during the heist, the daughter of the house comes home with her boyfriend to get some private time alone.

Karl kills Carson during the heist, shooting him four times. After leaving the jewelry store, he also shoots the two young lovers and escapes with $300 million in diamonds. Detectives Goren (D'Onofrio) and Eames (Erbe) are called to the case and begin following clues from the dead bodies left behind, specifically the dead body of Carson, which was wearing expensive new clothes. Following the trail of stolen credit cards used to purchase the clothes and equipment, they collect different witness sketches of a single man and a single woman, Karl and Gia. A review of the security tapes from preceding days in the jewelry store produces a clear image of Gia, casing the joint.

Meanwhile, Karl lays down fresh red herrings for the cops to follow by killing a soldier of the Masucci family and leaving diamonds on the body. This briefly distracts Captain Deakins (Jamey Sheridan) into thinking it's a mob show, at least until the diamonds left behind are identified as being the lowest quality and least expensive diamonds in the lot that was stolen.

With the assistance of a heavily tattooed friend, Goren is able to tie the homemade prison tattoo on Carson's body to a prison in Canada. With Carson's identity determined, the detectives are able to pull his record, and learn that he has skipped parole to enter the US, likely by train, which undergo less security. A canvass at Penn Station produces a witness, who is able to identify a mug shot of Nathan, who came to pick him up. A background check of Nathan results in an address, which the detectives raid.

The detectives find the house empty, but do seize a piece of expensive forgery equipment, left behind when the group abandoned the site. Nathan calls Karl to tell him that it is missing, and Karl orders him to buy a new one. Goren and Eames are ready for him, and Nathan is arrested when he goes to make the purchase. With the threat of the death penalty hanging over his head, he cuts a deal to help bring Karl in. He places a telephone call to Karl so that police can trace Karl's location, but Karl catches on and escapes. Goren and Eames arrive just in time to catch Gia, who was doing laundry and was left behind.

Goren convinces Gia during interrogation that Karl is only using her, and that he was having a relationship with Carson in prison. He shows Gia files that Carson had AIDS, and that through Karl, she is also infected. He promises to make sure she gets good medical care in prison if she helps him bring Karl in. With ADA Carver's (Courtney B. Vance) cooperation, he lets her go so she can bring Karl in. She retrieves the diamonds and is met by Karl, who is suspicious about why the police released her, and threatens to kill her. She tells him about Goren's attempt to convince her that he has AIDS, and denies working for the police. To persuade him that she does not believe the police, she is forced to sleep with him.

The buyers for the diamonds arrive at the hotel, examine the goods, and agree to pay Karl. Karl rejoices and goes to the other room to retrieve the rest of the diamonds. When he returns, he finds the police there and everyone already under arrest. Goren and Eames tell Gia that she is not actually infected with HIV, and the criminals are led away.

== Production ==
=== Development and filming ===
The pilot episode, "One", was written by series developer René Balcer (teleplay) and series creator Dick Wolf (story) and was directed by Law & Order franchise director, Jean de Segonzac.

Law & Order: Criminal Intent is the third series in the Law & Order crime drama franchise, which was created by Dick Wolf in 1990. He developed it with René Balcer, who began working on the original series during its first season. During his time on Law & Order, Balcer was promoted to head writer, show runner, and executive producer before leaving in 2000. News first broke of a new series in late 2000, when it was reported that NBC, broadcaster of Law & Order and Law & Order: Special Victims Unit, approached Wolf Films and Studios USA about a second spin-off.

Production began in January 2001, shooting on location in and around New York City using local color. The main set of One Police Plaza is located at Pier 62, Chelsea Piers, Manhattan. Thirteen episodes were initially ordered, and were completed by April 2001, so that production would not be halted by a potential strike from the Writers Guild of America.

=== Casting ===
Law & Order: Criminal Intent is not an ensemble series, and therefore differs from Law & Order and Law & Order: Special Victims Unit which respectively featured six and eight actors receiving star billing during the same broadcast season. Movie actor Vincent D'Onofrio was offered the lead role of Detective Robert Goren, a hyper-intuitive contemporary Sherlock Holmes-type investigator who used to work for the US Military Police. Other than a 1998 guest role on Homicide: Life on the Street that earned him an Emmy nomination, this was D'Onofrio's first major television role. Goren's partner, former vice squad detective Alexandra Eames, was played by Kathryn Erbe who had just completed a role on Oz as convicted murderer Shirley Bellinger. Balcer stated Erbe was cast because "she just looked like a real cop."

Courtney B. Vance plays Assistant District Attorney Ron Carver, a graduate of John Jay College of Criminal Justice. Jamey Sheridan was the last actor to be cast in a main role, taking the part of James Deakins, a "seasoned" NYPD Captain. In a recurring role, Leslie Hendrix appeared as Assistant Chief Medical Examiner Elizabeth Rodgers, the same character she had played in the other two series, but Hendrix left Law & Order: Special Victims Unit in its second season to be replaced by the star of the CBS soap opera As the World Turns Tamara Tunie who portrayed Medical Examiner Melinda Warner from then on. Hendrix remained being medical examiner on both the original L&O and CI until both series were canceled.

== Reception ==
=== Ratings ===
According to TV Tango's collection of ratings, the premiere of Law & Order: Criminal Intent on its original U.S. airdate was viewed by approximately 12.80 million total viewers with an 8.7 rating/13% share in the age 18-49 demographic. CI aired up against the various CBS Sunday Movie on CBS, a new drama, Alias on ABC, and two comedies, Nikki and Off Centre on The WB.

=== Critical response ===
Prior to Criminal Intent's premiere, Laura Fries of Variety commented on the difference between this series and Law & Order and Law & Order: Special Victims Unit: "By scrutinizing motive and intent, Criminal Intent utilizes a more personal style that sets it apart from its brethren. Wolf's characters are notoriously devoid of detailed personal lives, but debut [episode] hints at a little more introspection on the part of the characters". Fries commented on the overpowering screen presence that D'Onofrio commands in the first episode: "Criminal Intent so far is a one-man show with Vincent D'Onofrio at its center. [He] commands the most attention, tending to overshadow Erbe, who is reduced in the pilot to following Goren with an awe-struck look."
