= Taylor Roberts =

American actress and Creative Director

- Occupations: Actress, poet, creative director
- Years active: 2003–2005, 2012-present
- Website: taylor-roberts.com

Taylor Roberts is an American actress and Creative Director. She is known for her roles as Rachel Clark on AMC's Turn: Washington's Spies and Camilla Barnes on Law and Order Criminal Intent.

== Biography ==
Taylor was born to parents Gregory Roberts and Teresa Taylor, and was named Taylor after her mother's side of the family. Her late grandfather was a cousin of actress Dame Elizabeth Taylor though they never met.

Roberts is a survivor of the 2018 Montecito Mudslides, having lived without heat, hot water, and electricity for over three weeks. Soon after, she met Montecito Gourmet CEO, Patrick Braid, and together they founded Montecito Brands, dedicating gourmet food and beverage sales to help raise money for victims of wildfire and natural disaster. She credits those days of isolation and hunger in the aftermath of a natural disaster as life-altering and inspirational for what would become her mission as an artist and creative director in the years to come.

=== Acting ===
On her first film audition in Manhattan, Roberts booked the role of Louise in Mona Lisa Smile, directed by Mike Newell and starring Julia Roberts.

Soon after, Roberts tackled the challenging role of Emily, a mentally challenged savant, in Melissa Painter’s Admissions. In the film, Taylor gracefully fashioned the character based on research and work with savants in and around Los Angeles, including LA Goal. The film also starred Lauren Ambrose, Amy Madigan, Christopher Lloyd and John Savage.

More exposure came for Roberts as Camilla Barnes on Law & Order: Criminal Intent in the episode Shrink-Wrapped. Proving her versatility, she went against her young ingénue demeanor to play the surprise murderer alongside actors Vincent D'Onofrio, Margaret Colin and Brent Spiner.

Roberts attended the prestigious University of North Carolina School of the Arts studying both ballet and receiving her degree in Theatre working under then Dean of Drama, Gerald Freedman.

In addition to her time on set, Roberts participated in a series of staged readings of Al Pacino's Betsy and Napoleon. She considers these readings a highlight of her early career, reading the lead role of Betsy, and working alongside Mr. Pacino, Patrice Chéreau, F. Murray Abraham, Scarlett Johansson, Carol Kane, Sam Rockwell, Eric Stoltz and Bebe Neuwirth.

After a hiatus, Roberts returned to acting with television in the role of Rachel Clark in four episodes of the AMC drama series Turn (2014–2017), as well as roles in roles on Loiter Squad (2012) and Killing Kennedy (2013). Roberts received high praise for her haunting portrayal of Lady Macbeth in the independent film adaptation of Shakespeare's Macbeth, titled, Macbeth Unhinged.

=== Modeling ===
Roberts has worked as a model for many fashion brands both commercially, editorially, and on the runway. Her commercial, "Club La Senza" for La Senza Swimwear was named one of the Sexiest Ads of 2011 by Coed Magazine and Adrants.

=== Other works ===
In May 2012 Roberts launched Porphyrogene Luxury Skincare as the owner and founder.

=== Published works ===
In 2012, Roberts published her first book. Bombshell Bohemia: Poetry from the Underground is a collection of poems chronicling Roberts' years as an actress and poet living in New York and Los Angeles. Within 24 hours, the book reached Amazon's Top 100 Best Sellers in Poetry.
