= To the Boy in the Blue Knit Cap =

- Law & Order: Criminal Intent episode
- Detective Robert Goren (Vincent D'Onofrio) has a conversation with Rex Tamlyn (James Van Der Beek).
- Episode no.: Season 10; Episode 8
- Directed by: Jean de Segonzac
- Written by: Julie Martin; Chris Brancato
- Production code: 10008
- Original air date: June 26, 2011

Guest appearances
- Natalie Gold as Danielle Magee; Pawel Szajda as PJ Edwards; Manish Dayal as Samir Doss; Thad Luckinbill as Parker Gaffney; Trent Luckinbill as Thomas Gaffney; Richard Bekins as Mr. Gaffney; Tovah Feldshuh as Defense Attorney Danielle Melnick; Isiah Whitlock Jr. as CSU Detective; Brandon Jacobs as a bouncer; Leslie Hendrix as Dr. Elizabeth Rodgers; James Van Der Beek as Rex Tamlyn

Episode chronology
← Previous "Icarus"	Next → —
- Law & Order: Criminal Intent season 10

"To the Boy in the Blue Knit Cap" is the series finale of the American police procedural television drama series Law & Order: Criminal Intent. It is the eighth episode of the tenth season and the 195th episode overall. It originally aired in the United States on the USA Network on June 26, 2011. In this episode, Detectives Robert Goren and Alexandra Eames investigate a case centered on Parker and Thomas Gaffney, wealthy twins, who file a lawsuit against a social-networking site due to allegations of stealing copyright claims.

"To the Boy in the Blue Knit Cap" was written by Julie Martin and Chris Brancato (although uncredited), and was extensively rewritten by René Balcer, with Warren Leight writing the final scene of the episode, and it was directed by Jean de Segonzac. The story and the characters in the episode were highly influenced by the real-life lawsuit against Facebook made by Tyler Winklevoss and his brother Cameron Winklevoss, as well as the film adaption of the event, The Social Network. Critics reacted to the episode with mixed reception upon airing, with much criticism stemming from the cultural references and the episodic plot. Upon its original airing, "To the Boy In the Blue Knit Cap" was watched by 3.75 million viewers, and it achieved a 0.9 rating in the 18-49 demographic according to the Nielsen ratings. It featured guest appearances by James Van Der Beek, Thad Luckinbill, Trent Luckinbill, and Brandon Jacobs.

== Plot ==
Goren and Eames investigate when the bodies of twins Parker and Thomas Gaffney are found in the offices of popular dating website Kizmate. The Gaffneys were apparently seeking information to use in a lawsuit against Kizmate's founders, Danielle and PJ Edwards. The Gaffneys apparently had the idea for Kizmate first and asked Danielle to help code the site. Danielle claims the algorithm used on the site was one she devised herself after she met PJ and was trying to track him down, leaving a message for "the boy in the blue knit cap".

No security cam footage is available. Goren thinks Thomas's body was already unconscious and Parker was trying to drag him across the floor. Parker was himself attacked while occupied with his brother's body.

The twins' father says Kizmate was the twins' idea; when the site launched, they realized Danielle had stolen their idea and asked her for their share of the site's profits. She refused, and the twins sued. PJ confirms Danielle's alibi of being at home, but the detectives are unconvinced. She was spotted arguing with business partner Rex Tamlyn at a club that night. Goren speaks with Rex, who says that Parker was the man behind the lawsuit, but he does not think the twins have proof. Deodorant residue is found on Parker's hands, and it matches the type found on Thomas's body. Parker broke into the Kizmate offices to find proof Danielle stole their idea. Thomas went to stop him, and they fought. After Thomas was injured, Parker dragged him and sought help. He was interrupted and stabbed.

The detectives learn Hildy Whitmore's key card was used. Hildy, Danielle's assistant, tells Goren and Eames she did not give her card to anyone and becomes huffy when the detectives press. Meanwhile, one of the computer techs at Major Case discovers Danielle used the same algorithm for Kizmate as she did for the Gaffneys' site. Danielle denies taking the twins' idea, and Samir, a business partner with the Gaffneys, says Danielle was with him all night, working on an out-of-court settlement for the lawsuit. He did not want the twins or PJ to know about it until he was sure Danielle was on board.

PJ is upset that Danielle brokered a deal outside of court, but Rex reminds him they are still the public face of the company and they cannot have a public falling out. The detectives confront Rex about his alibi, suggesting that he was with Hildy that night, which Rex denies. Rex shows them a picture from a hidden camera in the office, and they notice a blue knit cap covered the lens. During questioning, Hildy admits she and PJ turned off the cameras to hide an affair. Parker used the affair to blackmail her into allowing him access to the office.

Samir says he was aware what the twins were up to and how Parker got into the Kizmate office. Goren uses Samir's phone to set up a trap for Danielle in Central Park. They accuse her of informing Thomas about the affair. Then, he told Parker about it, which Parker then used to blackmail Hildy. Danielle also had feelings for Thomas, so she warned him, and Thomas said that he was going to try to stop his brother. She was at the office and spotted Parker with Thomas's body. Parker blamed her for making Thomas go soft and turning against him, and he went to attack her. Danielle stabbed Parker with a pair of scissors in self-defense.

Meanwhile, Goren attends his final mandated therapy session with Dr. Gyson. She says that he is able to do his job, but he has anger and trust issues that will need ongoing treatment. She refers him to several therapists, but Goren does not want to begin with a new therapist when he already works well with her. Gyson insists that he will do fine, but Goren returns the cards and requests another session with her next week, to which she agrees.

The episode ends as Goren leaves Gyson's office and seems surprised to find that Eames awaits him on the street, standing outside of her familiar black SUV. Eames asks if Goren still has his job, to which Goren replies in the affirmative. Eames informs him that news of a bank robbery has just come over the com line and that the pair could catch the case if they can "get there before the feds do." Goren looks at Eames wordlessly, but searchingly, as she gets in the driver's seat; Eames does the same as Goren gets in the passenger seat and buckles his seat belt. Goren breaks the silence by glancing at Eames and saying "Let's go," and the two drive off toward the crime scene.

== Guest stars ==
- James Van Der Beek as Rex Tamlyn is a ruthless, drug-addicted CEO of a social-networking site. This is the only Law & Order: Criminal Intent episode in which Van Der Beek has appeared.
- Thad and Trent Luckinbill as Parker and Thomas Gaffney are wealthy identical twins, who file a lawsuit against a social-networking site, claiming that the idea was stolen from them. The characters were largely inspired by Tyler and Cameron Winklevoss, who filed a lawsuit against Facebook, alleging that creator Mark Zuckerberg had breached over copyright claims.
- Brandon Jacobs appears as a bouncer.
- Leslie Hendrix reprised her role as Dr. Elizabeth Rodgers, a recurring character in the fictional universe of Law & Order.

== Production ==
"To the Boy in the Blue Knit Cap" was directed by Jean de Segonzac, in his third episode of the season. This was the first Law & Order: Criminal Intent episode under the direction of Segonzac since the season-10 episode, "The Last Street in Manhattan". "To the Boy in the Blue Knit Cap" was co-written by Julie Martin and Chris Brancato and rewritten extensively by the series' creator René Balcer, with the final scenes written by former showrunner Warren Leight. Martin previously wrote "Icarus", while this would be the first episode that Brancato has written for the series since the season-10 episode "The Consoler". Dick Wolf, the creator of the Law & Order franchise, served as the executive producer for the episode alongside Brancato and Peter Jankowski. Guest appearances on the episode include an appearance by James Van Der Beek, who was portrayed as Rex Tamlyn. Thad and Trent Luckinbill made an appearance on the episode, playing the roles of Thomas and Parker Gaffney, wealthy twins. Brandon Jacobs, a running back for the New York Giants, also make an appearance as a bouncer.

"To the Boy in the Blue Knit Cap" features several references relating to music, film, literature, and other pop-culture phenomena. The plot and several characters featured were largely inspired by the controversial event involving the suing of Facebook by Tyler and Cameron Winklevoss, as well as the theatrical adaption of the event, The Social Network.

== Reception ==
"The final episode was less campy, but no less topical. In a nod to the creation of Facebook, or at least as it was portrayed in the movie The Social Network, Goren and Eames are called into the offices of a social-networking site, an online matchmaking service. Aryan-looking twins, like the real-life Winklevosses, are suing the site's founders, claiming they helped develop it. It wasn't the best or most challenging case Goren ever tackled, but it served its purpose, which was to show that Goren's intuitive skills didn't diminish as his psyche healed."

— Alessandra Stanley, of The New York Times.

"To the Boy in the Blue Knit Cap" first aired on June 26, 2011, in the United States on the USA Network. Upon its original airing, it was viewed by 3.75 million viewers. The episode garnered a 0.9 rating in the 18-49 demographic, according to the Nielsen ratings. The total viewership for the episode slightly increased from the previous episode, "Icarus", which was watched by 3.26 million viewers during its initial airing. However, ratings were steady from the previous episode, as it too garnered a 0.9 rating in the 18-49 demographic.

Television critics were largely polarized with the episode. Kate Ward of Entertainment Weekly stated that she was disappointed with the delivery of the episode. Ward criticized the writing, deeming it as a "lazy episode". Alessandra Stanley of The New York Times felt that the episode was "less campy, but no less topical." Phil Nugent of The A.V. Club gave the episode a C+, but opined that it was an improvement from the previous episode. Nugent felt that Van Der Beek's acting was not particularly outstanding, opining: "It kind of got lost in the shuffle, partly because none of the characters seemed especially passionate [...] about anyone, not the people they were supposed to be having affairs with nor the people they were suspected of having murdered. If that was meant to be the point, it was a self-defeating one."

Liz Kelly Nelson of Zap2it reacted negatively toward "To the Boy In the Blue Knit Cap". Nelson exclaimed that the episode was "downright unemotional", and expressed that "beyond the step-by-step as we follow Goren and Eames through the clues, there isn't much in the way of hints that this is [...] a series finale."

After confirming "To the Boy in the Blue Knit Cap" was Law & Order: CI's final episode on USA Network, co-president Jeff Wachtel commented on the finale when Goren (D'Onofrio) emerged from his final mandatory shrink session and headed off to a new crime scene with Eames (Erbe); "We felt that was a great place to leave things", he said. "It was a good series finale."
