= List of Law & Order: Criminal Intent characters =

Fictional character list

Law & Order: Criminal Intent, a spin-off of the crime drama Law & Order, follows the detectives who work in the "Major Case Squad" of the New York City Police Department, a unit that focuses on high-profile cases (in most cases murder, just like the regular Law & Order in this sense), such as those involving VIPs, local government officials and employees, the financial industry, and the art world; though sometimes the cases are similar to the cases from the original Law & Order show as well. From its fifth season until the beginning of the ninth season, which aired in September 2005 until April 2010, the series had generally shown four major detectives working the unit, in alternating episodes under the leadership of both Captain James Deakins and Captain Danny Ross. The unit also previously had a prosecutor assigned from the DA's office, that frequently interacted with the squad. The ninth and tenth seasons of the series showed two major detectives working the unit in all episodes under the leadership of Captain Zoe Callas and later Joseph Hannah.

One of the original characters on Law & Order, Detective Mike Logan (played by Chris Noth), appears in one episode of Season 4. At the beginning of Season 5, he is transferred from Staten Island to the Major Case Squad, where he worked until the end of Season 7.

== Main characters ==
Name	Portrayed by	Occupation	Season										Episodes
Name	Portrayed by	Occupation	1	2	3	4	5	6	7	8	9	10	Episodes
Senior Detectives
Alexandra Eames	Kathryn Erbe	Senior Detective	Main (Note: Vincent D'Onofrio and Kathryn Erbe appeared in only the first two episodes of season 9.)										144
Mike Logan	Chris Noth	Senior Detective				Guest	Main						36
Zack Nichols	Jeff Goldblum	Senior Detective								Main			24
Junior Detectives
Robert Goren	Vincent D'Onofrio	Junior Detective	Main										141
Carolyn Barek	Annabella Sciorra	Junior Detective					Main						12
Megan Wheeler	Julianne Nicholson	Junior Detective						Main					24
Nola Falacci	Alicia Witt	Junior Detective							Main				5
Serena Stevens	Saffron Burrows	Junior Detective									Main		15
Squad Supervisors
James Deakins	Jamey Sheridan	Captain	Main										111
Danny Ross	Eric Bogosian	Captain						Main (Note: Eric Bogosian appeared in only the first episode of season 9.)					61
Zoe Callas	Mary Elizabeth Mastrantonio	Captain									Main		14
Joseph Hannah	Jay O. Sanders	Captain										Also starring	8
Assistant District Attorneys
Ron Carver	Courtney B. Vance	A.D.A.	Main										111
Psychiatrists
Paula Gyson	Julia Ormond	Police Psychiatrist										Also starring	7

== Detectives ==
=== Robert Goren ===
- Portrayed by Vincent D'Onofrio.
- Episodes: "One" - "Loyalty (Part 2)", "Rispetto" - "To the Boy in the Blue Knit Cap"

Robert Goren is a quirky, extraordinarily intelligent investigator and criminal profiler, known for his instinct and insight. Often, Goren's intuition, rather than solid evidence, turns out to be the case-breaker. Each episode, Goren typically employs his knowledge of an unusually wide range of topics, from theoretical physics, chemistry, and literature to history, psychology, and multiple foreign languages. Goren once served in the Army Criminal Investigation Division, stationed in Germany and South Korea, and worked in the NYPD's Narcotics Division before transferring to Major Case (in the first-season episode "The Insider", it is revealed that he worked on three undercover operations resulting in 27 arrests and convictions).

The Robert Goren character is very reminiscent of Sherlock Holmes; he notices tiny-yet-important details ignored by others, and possesses broad, almost encyclopedic knowledge. Frequently, Goren obtains crucial information and confessions by psychologically manipulating and provoking suspects and their associates. Mental illness seems to run in Goren's family: his mother suffered from schizophrenia and his biological father was a serial killer. During the series, Goren's history, coupled with his unorthodox style, became a source of trouble within the NYPD, spawning rumors and accusations that he was mentally unstable. In particular, this view was held by the Chief of Detectives, who suspended him for six months without pay after he embarked on an unauthorized undercover infiltration of a prison's mental ward. In the season 7 finale, he lost his brother Frank (Tony Goldwyn) to his archnemesis Nicole Wallace. In the course of the investigation, he realized that his mentor, Dr. Declan Gage, had orchestrated the deaths of his brother and Wallace. During season eight, he begins to recover after the events of season 7. In "Loyalty", Goren and Eames are pulled off a pair of homicides by Ross, who informs them that the FBI has taken an interest in the case. Ross is later murdered as well, their prime suspect is taken into custody by the FBI, provoking Goren into a physical altercation that leads to his suspension. He continues to investigate on his own and eventually learns of a plan by the FBI to allow GPS-tagged weapons to be distributed to terrorist camps in Somalia, so that the camps could be easily targeted and wiped out. He is then fired by Eames, who had recently been offered a promotion to captain of the Major Case Squad; she subsequently quits instead.

=== Alexandra Eames ===
- Portrayed by Kathryn Erbe.
- Episodes: "One" - "Loyalty (Part 2)", "Rispetto" - "To the Boy in the Blue Knit Cap"

Alexandra Eames is the quiet, practical partner who generally seems to mesh well with Goren despite the noticeable personality differences between the two. She worked in the NYPD's Vice Division for four years before transferring to Major Case. Her character is much like the screen portrayals of Holmes's partner Doctor Watson: a lesser equal, overshadowed by the charismatic presence of a prodigious partner. While still an assertive and no-nonsense cop and the senior partner of the pairing, much of Eames's dialogue consists of sarcastic, pun-heavy observations delivered at dramatically opportune moments (much like Law & Order's Detective Lennie Briscoe character).

There are occasional hints of a strong affection, and even jealousy, between the two partners, but their relationship has never become romantic. Their working relationship is more formal than that of the lead detectives in Law & Order: Special Victims Unit –Elliot Stabler (Christopher Meloni) and Olivia Benson (Mariska Hargitay)– who typically address each other by their given names and have strong emotional interplay. Goren and Eames typically address each other by surname, but when either Eames or Goren is particularly stressed, she calls him "Bobby". She is a legacy officer: her father and late husband were both cops. In the third season, Eames embarked on a surrogate pregnancy for her sister and brother-in-law and, before her maternity leave, was assigned to desk duty at the police station; her work in the field with Goren was covered by G. Lynn Bishop. Recently, Goren and Eames' working relationship has become more strained, as she has become fed up with what she sees as Goren's habit of taking her for granted, expecting her to run interference for his off-beat tactics and style with both co-workers and superiors without acknowledging her contributions. These feelings boil over in the episode "Purgatory", after Goren embarks on a secret undercover mission for his superiors, and fails to inform her. Eames takes Wheeler's place starting in the episode "Major Case". In the episode "Loyalty," she and Goren are pulled off a pair of homicides by Ross, who has been working undercover for the FBI on a case involving one of the victims. When Ross is subsequently murdered, Goren soon gets into a physical altercation with the prime suspect, leading to his suspension and Eames' decision to covertly help him with his own investigation. She is offered a promotion to captain of the Major Case Squad on the condition that she fire Goren, but after doing so, she puts her badge and gun on Ross' desk and resigns.

Eames returns to the NYPD and the Major Case Squad at the start of Season 10, again partnered with Goren. They are brought back to duty at the request of the new squad captain, Joseph Hannah (Jay O. Sanders), who has been a friend of Goren since their initial training at the police academy. Since the end of Criminal Intent, Eames has appeared twice on Law & Order: Special Victims Unit, holding the rank of Lieutenant and commanding a task force formed jointly by the NYPD and the federal Department of Homeland Security.

=== G. Lynn Bishop ===
- Portrayed by Samantha Buck.
- Episodes: "Pravda" - "Mad Hops"

Bishop is introduced in the episode "Pravda" as the temporary partner of Det. Robert Goren (Vincent D'Onofrio), assigned to the Major Case Squad of the New York City Police Department (NYPD), due to Det. Alexandra Eames volunteering to serve as a surrogate mother for her sister's baby. Her character was only a temporary replacement and was not seen after Eames returned from maternity leave. Bishop and Goren often seem to have a lack of chemistry between them. She finds it difficult to keep up with Goren's many unorthodox ways of solving a case, something Eames had gotten accustomed to. Goren exacerbates the situation by making unfavorable comparisons between Bishop and Eames.

=== Mike Logan ===
- Portrayed by Chris Noth.
- Episodes: "Stress Position", "Grow" - "Last Rites"

Logan is a troubled detective who formerly worked in the detectives squad of Manhattan's 27th precinct (from 1990 to 1995, on Law & Order). He was banished to the NYPD's career graveyard (Staten Island) after publicly punching a homophobic politician who had murdered a gay man whom Logan had grudgingly come to respect; however, Logan redeemed himself by solving a dirty-cop murder-conspiracy case (the NBC TV movie Exiled: A Law & Order Movie). He was transferred from Staten Island to the NYPD's Domestic Disputes department. Logan first appeared on Criminal Intent in the fourth-season episode "Stress Position", through his romantic involvement with a nurse employed at a prison being investigated by Goren and Eames. At the beginning of season five, he was officially transferred to the Major Case Squad at the behest of Capt. Deakins, in the episode "Grow". In addition, Logan was involved in the "officer-involved shooting" used to fuel the career-ending conspiracy against Capt. Deakins. After solving a 16-year homicide case in the episode "Last Rites", dissatisfaction with the corruption and overall inflexibility of the justice system drove him to leave the force.

=== Carolyn Barek ===
Det. Carolyn Barek
- Law & Order character
- First appearance: "Diamond Dogs"
- Last appearance: "The Good"
- Portrayed by: Annabella Sciorra

In-universe information
- Title: NYPD Detective
- Family: Father; Mother; 2 brothers 1 sister
- Partner: Mike Logan
- Seasons: 1 (Season 5)

Det. Carolyn Barek is partnered with Detective Mike Logan throughout the fifth season of the show. Annabella Sciorra abruptly departed the cast at the end of the season and was written out in the sixth season.

Carolyn Barek is a criminal profiler from Brooklyn's Cobble Hill, and spent two years post-9/11 with the FBI. In addition to English, she also speaks Polish, Spanish, Italian, Creole, Russian, Cantonese, and Yiddish. Barek's badge number is 6141.

Barek previously worked without a partner, which accounts for her habit of talking to herself while examining a crime scene. She hints that her mother was strict; when a girl who abuses heroin dresses in front of her and Logan in the hospital, she tells Logan her mother would have killed her if she dressed or undressed in front of complete strangers. Barek is Catholic and, in contrast to Logan, she believes that even the worst sinner deserves forgiveness. Barek's father was a carpenter who was in a union. Barek admits to having a former boyfriend with a gambling problem, and spent two years trying to help him before ending the relationship.

She and Logan do not always see eye to eye, but she supports him when he needs it. For example, she publicly backs him when he accidentally shoots an undercover cop. She also notices when he falls ill, and takes him to a healer; the healer reveals that Logan came into contact with poison ivy, which he is allergic to, and inadvertently helps them solve the case.

Barek does not appear on the show after the end of the fifth season. She was replaced by Megan Wheeler. No reason for her apparent departure is stated by the show, but in the sixth season, it is hinted that she and Logan did not part on good terms: When the new captain, Danny Ross sarcastically mentions to Logan that he can get Barek back if Wheeler does not work out, Logan responds by rolling his eyes and grimacing.

Annabella Sciorra reprised her role as Barek in the 22nd season of Law & Order: Special Victims Unit, for the episode "Hunt, Trap, Rape, and Release". Barek, newly promoted to lieutenant and placed in command of the Bronx SVU, joins forces with Captain Olivia Benson and her team to find a serial rapist whose victims live in both Manhattan and the Bronx. When one of her detectives is revealed to be the rapist, she believes her NYPD career to be over; instead of forcing her to retire, though, Deputy Chief Garland transfers her from SVU to Homicide and urges her not to draw any attention to herself.

=== Megan Wheeler ===
Megan Wheeler
- Law & Order character
- First appearance: "Tru Love"
- Last appearance: "Major Case"
- Portrayed by: Julianne Nicholson

In-universe information
- Family: Margo Jane Wheeler (daughter); Colin John Ledger (ex-fiancé)
- Partner: Mike Logan; Zack Nichols
- Seasons: 6, 7, 8

Megan Wheeler becomes a detective in the Major Case Squad when she replaces Carolyn Barek as Mike Logan's partner. She transfers in with the new captain, her mentor Danny Ross. She had worked undercover for three years—including assignments on vice, drugs, and white-collar crime—and handled a money laundering probe with Ross.

During an investigation, Wheeler recalls how her mother had to become a waitress to support both of them when Wheeler's father abandoned them. It is later revealed that Wheeler's father, a lawyer connected to the American Mafia, disappeared 20 years before and is either in hiding or dead—killed by the mob. Her father had allegedly been getting a cut of mob profits, which helped pay Wheeler's private school tuition; but the arrangement ended after a change of mob bosses.

When Wheeler first joins the Major Case Squad, Logan questions whether someone as young as her would be capable of handling major homicide cases, and he remarks that she is his first partner to have freckles. Ross replies that, in her three years undercover, "no one ever made her." However, the age difference proves useful when Wheeler is familiar with the shorthand used by adolescents in text messaging one another. However, she is shown in the same episode to be unable to hear the ultrasonic ring tone used by a teenage suspect to sneak a cell phone into school, a frequency that it was claimed few people over age 30 can detect. She gets engaged to a businessman named Colin Ledger (played by Nicholson's husband, Jonathan Cake). Eventually, however, Ledger is arrested by the FBI for fraud, money laundering, and racketeering.

At the end of Season 6, Wheeler tells Logan that she is going to Europe to teach a course on American police procedure (This story explained the absence of Julianne Nicholson, who was taking maternity leave). During her absence in Season 7 she is replaced by Detective Nola Falacci. Wheeler returns to the Major Case Squad in "Contract".

After Logan leaves the squad and retires, Wheeler is assigned a new partner, Zack Nichols. Ross mentions to Nichols that Wheeler seems to have had issues with her previous partner and her ex-fiancé and is not ready to trust him. She says that Ledger is facing 12 years in federal prison and that she is pregnant with his child, coinciding with Nicholson's second pregnancy. She also says that she won't let him know about his child.

Wheeler faces another crisis when internal affairs accuses her of being Ledger's accomplice. Later, she says that the Bureau wants to call her as a witness at his trial, which she fears will affect her job. Ross reassures her that the situation isn't her fault and that no one really thinks that she's corrupt.

Wheeler made her last full episode appearance of Season 8 in "Passion", to coincide with Nicholson's pregnancy. Alexandra Eames takes her place in the last two episodes of the season. Her final appearance of any sort is later in 2009. She can briefly be seen in "Major Case", discussing a case in Ross' office, when her water breaks and Eames takes her to the hospital. After being accompanied by Eames at the hospital, it is revealed that she has a sister who stays with her while she gives birth. She names the baby "Margo Jane Wheeler".

In Season 9 Wheeler is replaced by Serena Stevens. Her exit is initially unexplained. However, in the Law & Order: Special Victims Unit Season 15 episode "Gambler's Fallacy", aired in 2014, Detective Amanda Rollins (Kelli Giddish) uses Wheeler's ID and badge to remove a gun from an evidence room. Detective Nick Amaro (Danny Pino) later says that "Detective Wheeler retired four years ago."

=== Nola Falacci ===
- Portrayed by Alicia Witt.
- Episodes: "Seeds"–"Senseless"

Nola Falacci served as Logan's partner for a short time while Wheeler was in Europe teaching American police procedure to European police officers. She is apparently the child of Sicilian and Irish parents and is characterized as brash, short-tempered and lacking tact. In one episode Capt. Ross tells Logan that she is "not a people person" and in another she makes Logan comment that he sounds like "the voice of reason". She is happily married with three children.

In the episode "Contract", Logan tells Wheeler that Falacci is now a training officer for the CIA at the agency's headquarters in Quantico, Virginia, having felt hamstrung at Major Case.

=== Zack Nichols ===
Det. Zack Nichols
- Law & Order character
- First appearance: "Rock Star"
- Last appearance: "Three-In-One"
- Portrayed by: Jeff Goldblum

In-universe information
- Family: Dr. Theodore Nichols (father); Unnamed mother Unnamed brother Rita (cousin)
- Partner: Danny Ross (offscreen); Megan Wheeler; Serena Stevens; Alexandra Eames
- Seasons: 8, 9

Zachary Nichols is portrayed by Jeff Goldblum.

Nichols is a police detective with the NYPD Manhattan Major Case Squad. He was introduced in the show's eighth season to replace Detective Mike Logan (Chris Noth). During that season he and his partner Detective Megan Wheeler were featured in half the episodes shown, alternating with Robert Goren and Alex Eames; the next year, during the show's ninth season, he and his new partner Serena Stevens were the only detectives featured. Neither Nichols nor Stevens returned for the tenth and final season; however, their characters were not specifically written out or addressed in any way during the final season.

Detective Nichols was once partnered with Captain Danny Ross in the NYPD's Anti-Crime task force. However, after the 9/11 attacks, Nichols left the police force for seven years. Ross remarked that during this period, his only clue to Nichols' whereabouts was a postcard from Cleveland.

Detective Eames begins partnering with Nichols after Nichols' partner, Megan Wheeler, went into labor and gave birth. Together they investigate Henry Muller (Dylan Baker), a forensics scientist with the NYPD who murdered a teenage girl. Nichols' investigation of Muller, who has clout from within the department, puts Nichols’ career in jeopardy and causes conflict between him and Ross, who comments that he himself risked being suspended almost every month while he and Nichols were partners due to the latter's unconventional, risk-taking behavior. Nichols ultimately gets Muller to confess, however, getting himself and Ross back into the NYPD's good graces.

Nichols becomes full-time partners with Detective Serena Stevens, who is introduced in the second part of the two-part Season 9 premiere episode "Loyalty". Both detectives work under the command of Captain Zoe Callas during this season, after Ross is killed while taking part in an FBI sting operation.

Nichols is the child of two psychiatrists, but shunned their profession; becoming a police officer was a form of rebellion. Nichols and his father, Dr. Theodore Nichols (F. Murray Abraham), do not speak for years afterward. They reconcile when Nichols asks his father for assistance with a murder investigation involving a suspect with dissociative identity disorder, which happens to be the elder Nichols' specialty. Nichols also mentions having an older brother although the character is not shown.

He carries a Kahr K9 as his sidearm, a pistol authorized by the real-life NYPD for many years. The department discontinued use of the weapon because it could not be modified to function on a trigger pull of 12 pounds, as mandated by internal regulations to reduce the chance of accidental discharge by officers.

Nichols attended a public grade school, but as a teenager went to Emerson Academy, an exclusive college-preparatory school. There, he learned to play piano. He also had a relationship with a young woman named Lenore Abrigaille (Mili Avital) that ended when she descended into mental illness.

The following are the medals and service awards worn by Detective Nichols.

American Flag Breast Bar
World Trade Center Breast Bar
NYPD Excellent Police Duty
NYPD Unit Citation

=== Serena Stevens ===
Detective Serena Stevens
- Law & Order character
- First appearance: "Loyalty (Part 2)"
- Last appearance: "Three-In-One"
- Portrayed by: Saffron Burrows

In-universe information
- Family: Kira (daughter)
- Partner: Zack Nichols
- Seasons: 9

Serena Stevens is the replacement for Detective Megan Wheeler, who left as partner of Zack Nichols at the end of season eight ("Major Case") and for Detective Alexandra Eames, who left with her partner Robert Goren for the remainder of the ninth season after the two-part-premiere, "Loyalty".

Before transferring to New York, she was with the Chicago Police Department. During her childhood, Stevens briefly lived in Islamabad with her father, a Marine stationed at the American embassy, and learned to read Urdu and Arabic.

She is a fan of the Chicago White Sox. She hints at being somewhat of a baseball fan when she recognized a dead person as a former baseball player and starts telling Nichols stats regarding his short-lived major league career. She has an eight-year-old daughter named Kira.

== Captains ==
=== James Deakins ===
Capt. James Deakins
- Law & Order character
- First appearance: Season 1: One
- Last appearance: Season 5: The Good
- Portrayed by: Jamey Sheridan

In-universe information
- Title: NYPD captain
- Occupation: Police captain
- Family: Angie Deakins (wife); 3 daughters
- Seasons: 1, 2, 3, 4, 5

Captain James "Jimmy" Deakins is played by Jamey Sheridan.

On the show, Deakins supervises New York City's Major Case Squad. His top detectives include partners Robert Goren and Alexandra Eames, as well as partners Mike Logan and Carolyn Barek.

Although Deakins' first priority is the success of criminal investigations, he is often forced to rein in his more unpredictable detectives, especially Goren and Logan, to manage the bad publicity they occasionally attract. While this has created some friction between Deakins and his detectives, for the most part they respect his professional judgment and authority.

Deakins and his wife, Angie, have three daughters. He had a bout with Bell's palsy at the end of Season 4. While in recovery, he took to wearing an eye patch over his affected eye. He is now more reliant on eyeglasses. (Sheridan actually had Bell's palsy himself when those episodes were filmed.)

Deakins leaves his post at the end of Season 5 rather than battle a conspiracy to frame him instigated by former police officer Frank Adair (Michael Rispoli), whom Major Case detectives had arrested for killing his lover and her husband and who was sentenced to life without parole. The trouble begins when Logan is forced to shoot a man in self-defense. Later, Logan learns that the man he shot was an undercover cop. A uniformed policeman, Officer Martinez, backs up Logan's self-defense claim, but Adair plants an e-mail falsely implicating Deakins in official corruption. Adair plans to claim that Deakins had "bought" Martinez's testimony for Logan. Goren and Eames uncover the forged e-mail, but Adair continues fighting Deakins.

Unwilling to subject the NYPD, and his MCS unit in particular, to further embarrassment, Deakins decided to retire from service. He is replaced by Danny Ross, who joined the cast in the Season 6 premiere episode.

=== Danny Ross ===
Captain Danny Ross
- Law & Order character
- First appearance: Season 6: Blind Spot
- Last appearance: Season 9: Loyalty, Part 1
- Portrayed by: Eric Bogosian

In-universe information
- Title: NYPD captain
- Occupation: Police captain
- Family: Jeremy Ross (son); Unnamed Son (son); Nancy Ross (ex-wife); Unnamed sister (sister); Rita (cousin)
- Partner: Zack Nichols (offscreen)
- Seasons: 6, 7, 8, 9

Capt. Daniel Ross is portrayed by Eric Bogosian.

He is introduced in the episode "Blind Spot" as the successor of James Deakins. He is given the position of captain of the Major Case Squad as a reward for a successful three-year stint as head of the NYPD's Joint Task Force on International Money Laundering.

Ross takes a more "hands-on" approach to the administration of Major Cases than Deakins. He often goes out into the field, especially for arrests, and occasionally participates in direct interrogations of suspects. He is far less tolerant of the unorthodox methods of Det. Robert Goren, though the two eventually come to a better understanding and relationship. Ross also uses his prior relationship as supervisor to Det. Megan Wheeler at the Joint Task Force to keep close watch on "loose cannon" Detective Mike Logan. In the episode "Rock Star", he remarks that he was at one time partners with Logan's replacement, Zach Nichols. He frequently lectures his detectives on being kept "in the loop" and updated on every development of each case. In the episode "Purgatory" he assigns Goren to go undercover without telling Goren's partner, Alexandra Eames.

In the episode "Betrayed", he runs interference when his ex-girlfriend is accused of murder. In "Major Case", he says to Nichols (who risked ruining his career over a murder case) that he himself came close to being suspended at least once a month while they were partners, due to Nichols' behavior.

Captain Ross is shot and killed in the line of duty in the first part of the season 9 premiere "Loyalty" as a result of working undercover with the FBI on a RICO case. He is given a 21-gun salute at his funeral, with the entire Major Case Squad and many other NYPD officers and staff members in attendance.

Ross is divorced and has two sons, ages 14 and 10. He is very protective of them; during a case involving a teacher having an affair with one of her students, Logan asks him what he would do if he found out a teacher was having sex with either one of his sons. Ross replies that he would "break them in two...male or female." In another episode ("Albatross") Ross and his sons witness a murder during a re-enactment of the famous duel between Aaron Burr and Alexander Hamilton. Ross keeps his kids busy by having them collect the video cameras of all the other witnesses so they wouldn't be near the body. In the season 7 opener "Amends", Ross reveals that his older son Jeremy, age 15, has been caught in bed with a girl, and that Ross' ex-wife wants him to have a talk with their son. Despite being divorced, Ross maintains something of a friendship with his ex-wife, Nancy, and her new boyfriend, Todd. In a 2006 episode, the whole family is seen eating Thanksgiving dinner together before Ross is called away to a crime scene. In the second Nichols/Wheeler team episode, "In Treatment", Ross mentions to Zach Nichols that he has a cousin, Rita, who for 20 years has sent him cat toys for Christmas because he said she was pregnant when she wasn't.

Ross frequently makes cultured references to cases. In the episode "Neighborhood Watch", after his detectives close a homicide involving a very ignorant murderer, he refers to the killer as "the banality of evil", quoting the sub-title of the book Eichmann in Jerusalem by political theorist Hannah Arendt. In "30", when a prime suspect believed to be a KGB agent is revealed to be a fraud living in Brighton Beach, Ross calls him a "Brighton Beach Walter Mitty", referring to the main character of the short story by James Thurber. He also refers to the Akira Kurosawa film Rashomon in "Weeping Willow", which involved several unreliable witnesses involved in a computer crime, calling it "cyber-Rashomon".

Ross is Jewish, and in one episode ("30") that addressed the killing of a civilian by the Israeli military, Logan asks Ross if he is, for the purposes of the case at hand, "a Jew first and a cop second". Ross in fact turns down an appeal by a pro-Israel friend to act in the interests of that country.

Although it is never officially mentioned on screen, there are several moments that imply a romantic relationship between Dr. Elizabeth Rodgers (Leslie Hendrix) and Ross. In one episode, Ross and Rodgers can be seen getting into an elevator dressed for going to the theater.^{E709} When Ross asks Rodgers for information on Goren, Goren later confronts Ross with this, shouting at Ross, "Did your girlfriend tell you that?!"^{E722} After Ross is murdered, Goren and Eames arrive at the crime scene to find Rodgers already there, visibly distraught over both his death and the fact that the FBI is denying her access to the body.^{E901}

=== Zoe Callas ===
Captain Zoe Callas
- Law & Order character
- First appearance: "Broad Channel"
- Last appearance: "Three-In-One"
- Portrayed by: Mary Elizabeth Mastrantonio

In-universe information
- Family: Unnamed daughter Unnamed ex-husband Unnamed brother
- Seasons: 1 (season 9)

Callas is the successor for Danny Ross. Callas transferred from the Internal Affairs Bureau to be the captain of the Major Case Squad.^{S9E03} ^{S9E07} However, she stays around as captain for only one season before being replaced by Joseph Hannah in Season 10. Her sudden departure from the Major Case Squad is never explained. Callas and Lieutenant Kate Dixon are the only police main characters in the Law & Order universe who are not seen with a service weapon.

Callas mentions she is from a Greek-American family and has a daughter. Callas is divorced. Her eldest daughter is at Columbia University as a premed student.^{S9E11} She also has mentioned she has a brother who works in the construction field.^{S9E12}

=== Joseph Hannah ===
- Portrayed by Jay O. Sanders.
- Episodes: "Rispetto" – "To the Boy in the Blue Knit Cap"

Joseph Hannah is Zoe Callas' replacement. Hannah is a friend of Detective Robert Goren since their police academy days. Hannah possesses an easy authority, but also a humorous side, and he shares a buddy-buddy rapport with some of his detectives. Hannah has a similar rapport with Detectives Goren and Eames that James Deakins had with them.

Early on, Hannah gently confronts Goren about his mandatory shrink sessions with Dr. Gyson, reminding him that the sessions were mandated as part of Goren's reinstatement and that the NYPD brass still believe Goren is crazy. In "The Consoler", after Goren insults Hannah about a case in front of Eames, he privately tells Goren he understands him and how he does things, and vice versa. He then tells Goren "I've got your back, and you respect my face and don't get in it." This compels Goren to begin attending his sessions.

Jay O. Sanders, the actor who portrays Captain Joseph Hannah, appeared previously on Law & Order: Criminal Intent, in the episode "Dead" (Season 2, Episode 1), playing Harry Rowan, freelance hit-man.

== Assistant District Attorneys ==
=== Ron Carver ===
Ron Carver
- Law & Order character
- First appearance: September 30, 2001 (episode 1.01: "One")
- Last appearance: May 14, 2006 (episode 5.22: "The Good")
- Portrayed by: Courtney B. Vance

In-universe information
- Occupation: Assistant District Attorney
- Family: Unknown (wife); 1 daughter
- Seasons: 1, 2, 3, 4, 5

Ronald "Ron" Carver is played by Courtney B. Vance. He was named after George Washington Carver.

Carver often works in conjunction with detectives Robert Goren, Alexandra Eames, Mike Logan, and Carolyn Barek of the Major Case Squad. He graduated from John Jay College of Criminal Justice. As an Assistant District Attorney, his interpretation and prosecution of the law is strict and unyielding, and he has little sympathy for people who break it, regardless of circumstance. This sometimes puts him in conflict with Goren, who has solved some crimes by empathizing with the criminals and has occasionally manipulated investigations so they get more lenient prison sentences than those which Carver wants to impose.

Carver is also frequently in conflict with all the detectives because they tend to rely on hunches and instinct, when he wants more hard evidence. Despite this conflict, however, he has a strong working relationship with both teams. Few things have been revealed about his personal life. He evidently has some experience with religion, as he can recognize and recite Biblical passages. Though he wears a wedding ring, the only direct reference he has made to being married was during a particularly twisted investigation; after hearing all the gruesome details, he observed, "This makes me want to go home and kiss my wife". He is anti-abortion and a fan of classic model cars. While in law school, he also formed a barbershop quartet-style singing group with several of his classmates.

Carver was written out of Law & Order: Criminal Intent after Vance left the show at the end of its fifth season. Carver was to be replaced by Patricia Kent. The part was originally given to Nona Gaye (Marvin Gaye's daughter), but she left the show within a few days citing creative differences. Gaye was replaced by Theresa Randle, who herself only appeared in two episodes. Kent once quoted Carver as referring to Major Case as "major hunch."

As has often taken place in the Law & Order franchise, Vance first appeared on the original Law & Order series in a 1990 episode, "By Hooker, By Crook" as an unnamed Mayor's Aide. He also appeared in the season 5 episode, "Rage". In that episode, he portrayed Benjamin Greer, a murder suspect interviewed and arrested by Detectives Lennie Briscoe (Jerry Orbach) and Mike Logan.

Appearing in 111 episodes, Carver is the second longest serving ADA in the Law & Order franchise, behind SVU's Casey Novak (Diane Neal).

=== Other recurring ADAs ===
Name	Portrayed by	Year	# Eps
A.D.A. Patricia Kent	Theresa Randle	2006	2
A.D.A. Claudia Shankly	Bridget Regan	2006-2007	2
A.D.A. Terri Driver	Leslie Hope	2008	2

== Recurring characters ==
=== Doctor Elizabeth Rodgers ===
- Portrayed by Leslie Hendrix.
- Episodes: "One" - "To the Boy in the Blue Knit Cap"

Dr. Elizabeth Rodgers is a recurring character in the fictional universe of the crime drama franchise Law & Order. She is an Assistant Chief Medical Examiner regularly seen on Law & Order, as well as Criminal Intent.

== Minor characters ==
=== Nicole Wallace ===
- Portrayed by Olivia d'Abo.
- Episodes: "Anti-Thesis", "A Person of Interest", "Great Barrier", "Grow" and "Frame". Significant plot line, implied presence only, in "Slither". Inspiration (mention only), in "Renewal", for another female murderer/student to write a criminology paper on Wallace as a female serial killer. Flashback footage in final season's "Boots on the Ground".

Nicole Wallace is Robert Goren's archnemesis. A criminal mastermind, she is one of the few people Goren encounters throughout the series who can get the better of him, particularly by confronting him about his unhappy childhood. Goren theorizes that she was molested by her father as a child and that the trauma bred in her a pathological drive to use and destroy anyone who gets close to her; this is frequently implied to be true. Goren also believes that she murdered her own daughter Hannah in her native Australia, because she saw the girl as a sexual rival (in the episode "Grow", she insists that her daughter's death was an accident).

She murders nine people during her five appearances on the show, and it is explained in "Anti-Thesis" that, years before, she worked with her then-lover — a criminal svengali named Bernard Fremont (Michael York) — to seduce, then rob and murder eight male tourists in Thailand. In the episode "Slither", Fremont is indicted on a murder charge and found dead soon afterward, a hypodermic syringe jabbed into his chest. Goren holds Wallace responsible (implying her tenth murder), knowing her aptitude with various poisons and believing her to be in New York at the time.

She is introduced in the episode "Anti-Thesis" as a con artist and thief living in the U.S. under the alias "Elizabeth Hitchens" and working at Hudson University as a literature professor. The episode reveals that she murdered the real Hitchens and assumed her identity. When Goren questions her about a murder that she manipulated a graduate student into committing, the two form an instant rivalry, which becomes obsessive after she flees the country. In her next appearance, "A Person of Interest", Goren tricks her into admitting responsibility for another murder, but she is found not guilty in "Pas de Deux", thanks to a team of lawyers hired by her wealthy husband, Gavin Haynes (Richard Joseph Paul), who later divorces her. In "Great Barrier", she re-emerges as the brains behind a diamond theft scam perpetrated by her lover, Ella Miyazaki (Grace Hsu). Wallace later murders Ella when she discovers that she is wearing a wire, and falls to her apparent death in the process. She was slated to die in this episode, but the producers gave fans the option to vote on a real death versus her having faked her own death. Sure enough, she turns up alive in the episode "Grow".

While she is characterized as "a psychopath" and "a monster" by other characters, certain episodes suggest that Wallace is not entirely without humanity. In "Grow", for example, she puts herself at risk to save Gwen Chapel (Molly Gottleib), the young daughter of her boyfriend Evan Chapel (Kevin J. O'Connor), after she discovers that he is trying to kill Gwen in order to collect on a multimillion-dollar trust fund. She gives Goren incriminating evidence against Evan and kidnaps Gwen to take her to the girl's aunt in Arizona, but lets her go in a moment of conscience. She leaves a voicemail for Goren, admitting she could not trust herself with the child, and cursing him for taking away her last chance at happiness.

She makes her final appearance in the season 7 finale, "Frame", in which she kills Goren's brother Frank (Tony Goldwyn) with an injection of succinylcholine after having sex with him. In turn, she is murdered by Goren's former mentor, Dr. Declan Gage (John Glover), who sends her heart in a package to Goren. According to Gage, her final words were, "Tell Bobby he was the only man I've ever loved."

The eighth episode of the 2013 series Jo involves a murder suspect named Madeline Haynes (played by Olivia d'Abo). Interpol records show that her fingerprints match those of Nicole Wallace, and Wallace's backstory is mentioned, including her supposed final words. However, Haynes' DNA does not match that on record in New York for Nicole Wallace, most likely, she used forensic trickery to escape justice and assume a new identity. According to the actress and creator and writer René Balcer, Madeline is Nicole Wallace with a new identity.

=== Declan Gage ===
- Portrayed by John Glover
- Episodes: "Blind Spot" and "Frame"

Declan Gage, Goren's former mentor, appeared in two episodes. In "Blind Spot", his daughter Jo murders two people and kidnaps Eames to make her father notice her. In "Frame", it is revealed he is showing signs of diminishing capacity and concocts a plan to dispose of people whom Gage sees as destructive in Goren's life, "to set him free". Gage had even written a book about female murderers just to lure Nicole Wallace back to town. When she takes the bait, he lets her kill Goren's brother. He then kills Wallace and sends her heart to Goren. He, however, refused her advances, telling Goren, "I think you and I may be the only two men who ever said 'No' to her. It's the only way to engage her."

Using Wallace's M.O., he stages an attempt on his own life, although the post date on the package containing the heart reveals she was already dead at the time. He even gaslights Goren to make him re-engage with life by defending himself against the suspicion he murdered his brother for life insurance to be paid to a Swiss bank account in the name of one of Goren's undercover aliases. He described his relationship with his daughter ("Blind Spot") as "never better"; she is in a coma resulting from blood loss when she bit off her own tongue.

=== Conroy "Connie" Smith ===
- Portrayed by Billy Lush.
- Episodes: "Sound Bodies", "In the Wee Small Hours (Part 1)"

He first appears in "Sound Bodies" as a charismatic, but deeply disturbed, young man who manipulates three girls into committing murder. In "In the Wee Small Hours", he takes up an offer from Goren and Eames to spy on a prisoner in exchange of postal privileges at Rikers Island, where he was transferred for a few weeks.

=== Wally Stevens ===
- Portrayed by Mark Linn-Baker
- Episodes: "Probability", "Endgame"

Wally Stevens first appeared in "Probability" as an eccentric employee at an insurance company. It is through evidence of repetition and patterns that Goren and Eames conclude that Wally is on the autism spectrum (Asperger's Syndrome) as well as orchestrating several murders of homeless people for insurance money. Eames remarks that Goren and Wally have many things in common, and wryly suggests that the two of them should be penpals. He reappears in "Endgame" as an unwitting conduit between Goren, with whom he has been corresponding, and Mark Ford Brady, who is in the same penitentiary.

=== Detective Daniels ===
- Portrayed by Seth Gilliam
- Episodes: "Players", "Amends", "Senseless", and "Purgatory"

Detective Daniels is a detective who worked in conjunction with the Major Case Squad and the narcotics unit when drugs and gangs were possibly involved in the murder cases at hand. Daniels is introduced in the sixth-season episode, "Players" where a judge's son is found shot to death, shortly after a notorious rap artist is sentenced in court. He later returns in the season seven premiere where a police officer is shot - initially believed to be committed by a high-level drug dealer. Daniels briefly appears in the episode "Senseless" where three kids with no criminal related backgrounds were murdered on a playground by a murderous Mexican drug dealer who felt his victim looked down on him. Daniels helps Detectives Logan and Falacci bust an MS13 dealer believed to be involved in the killings.

Daniels last episode was "Purgatory" where Goren gets involved with an ex-cop involved in a high-profile murder of two tourists, Goren later is fully placed undercover by the Chief of Detectives in order to get his badge back after losing it prematurely going undercover in a prison in New York State. Daniels is partnered with Detective Eames; working on the tourists's murder; when a connection is finally made he and Eames wind up busting in on Goren who is undercover. It was never mentioned what happened to Daniels after this episode.

=== Faith Yancy ===
- Portrayed by Geneva Carr.
- Episodes: "In the Wee Small Hours (Parts 1 & 2)", "Masquerade", "Albatross", "Neighborhood Watch", and "Lady's Man"

Faith Yancy is a TV journalist who sometimes reports on the Major Case Squad's high-profile cases. The character is an apparent parody of Nancy Grace, considering she helms a sensationalist news show in the vein of the real-life Grace's HLN program; in addition, her name itself can be seen as a parody of Nancy Grace's - "Faith" instead of "Grace," and "Yancy" instead of "Nancy." She also speaks with a slight Southern twang similar to Grace's.

=== Stanley Maas ===
- Portrayed by David Zayas.
- Episode: "Loyalty (Parts 1 & 2)"

Maas joined as a temporary replacement for Captain Danny Ross, who was murdered working a Racketeer Influenced and Corrupt Organizations Act case with the Federal Bureau of Investigation. Maas is the first Lieutenant to be the commanding officer of the Major Case Squad. He lets Goren, Eames, and Nichols work on the case at hand along with the murder of Ross. After Goren gets heated and shoves Jan Van Dekker in court, Maas suspends him from duty. He later puts Eames up for recommendation to Chief of Detectives Moran that she be the next Captain of the squad, on condition that she fire Goren. She does, but quits immediately thereafter. Both Maas and Eames are replaced by Zoe Callas.

=== Doctor Paula Gyson ===
- Portrayed by: Julia Ormond
- Episodes: "The Consoler" - "To the Boy in the Blue Knit Cap"

A police psychologist charged with conducting mandatory sessions with Detective Goren as a condition of his return to the NYPD.

=== Robert Goren's family ===
- Rita Moreno – Frances Goren, mother (2006–2007)
- Tony Goldwyn – Frank Goren, brother (2006–2008)
- Roy Scheider – Mark Ford Brady, biological father (2007)
- Trevor Morgan – Donny Carson, nephew (2007)

== Crossover characters within the Law & Order franchise ==
Name	Portrayed by	Year
District Attorney Nora Lewin	Dianne Wiest	2001
Detective Lennie Briscoe	Jerry Orbach	2001
Detective Ed Green	Jesse L. Martin	2001
Lieutenant Anita Van Buren	S. Epatha Merkerson	2002
Dr. Emil Skoda	J.K. Simmons	2002
District Attorney Arthur Branch	Fred Dalton Thompson	2005
Dr. Elizabeth Olivet	Carolyn McCormick	2006
Attorney Danielle Melnick	Tovah Feldshuh	2011

== Episode sources ==
^E516 "Dramma Giocoso". Law & Order: Criminal Intent. Season 5. Episode 16. 2006-04-09.
^E709 "Untethered". Law & Men: Criminal Intent. Season 7. Episode 9. 2007-12-06.
^E722 "Frame". Law & Order: Criminal Intent. Season 7. Episode 22. 2008-08-24.
^E901 "Loyalty". Law & Order: Criminal Intent. Season 9. Episode 1. 2010-03-30.
^S9E03
^S9E07
^S9E11
^S9E12
