= Robert Goren =

- Law & Order character
- First appearance: September 30, 2001 (episode 1.01: "One")
- Last appearance: June 26, 2011 (episode 10.08: "To the Boy In the Blue Knit Cap")
- Portrayed by: Vincent D'Onofrio

In-universe information
- Title: NYPD Junior Detective
- Occupation: Police Officer
- Family: Frances Goren (mother), William Goren (step-father), Mark Ford Brady (father), Frank Goren (brother, potentially half-brother), Donny Carlson (nephew), Molly (niece)
- Partner: Alexandra Eames; G. Lynn Bishop (temporary)
- Seasons: 1–10

Robert "Bobby" Goren is a fictional character featured in the NBC-USA Network police procedural and legal drama television series Law & Order: Criminal Intent, portrayed by Vincent D'Onofrio.

Goren is a detective investigator first grade for the Major Case Squad in the New York City Police Department (NYPD). His shield number is 4376. He is partnered with Det. Alexandra Eames (Kathryn Erbe). As created by executive producer René Balcer, Goren is an intense, extremely intelligent, and imposing man, but is also unpredictable and sometimes volatile. He appeared in 141 episodes.

== Character overview ==
A highly intelligent, emotionally intuitive man, Goren has a talent for forming complex psychological profiles and understanding the "why" of even the most unusual crimes. While intellectually gifted, he has many personal demons, and his eccentricity and unconventional investigative methods sometimes rub his colleagues the wrong way. Goren himself has admitted his investigative style is unusual, stating that "I am an acquired taste". His partner, Alexandra Eames, was at first so puzzled by his methods that she asked for a new partner. She eventually came to respect his abilities, however, and the two became very close. On occasion, she makes 'apologies' to the people they question, as part of their investigations, for his 'style' and manner. In one episode, she notes 'the job' is pretty much all he does. Goren questions his own sanity while in a therapy session [ordered by his superiors]. In the episode Gone (2005), about a child prodigy who later became a famous chess grand-master before going awry and committing murder, he tells the suspect's mother, regarding her explanation of her son's behavior, "That's not eccentricity; it's mental illness", and later tells Eames, upon the suspect's arrest, "See, that's what happens when you keep people from doing what they do best ... It makes them insane."

== Fictional character biography ==
=== Personal and family life ===
Robert O. Goren was born on August 20, 1961, and grew up in the Canarsie neighborhood of Brooklyn, near The Rockaways. A phenomenally bright young man, he took the Minnesota Multiphasic Personality Inventory in his senior year of high school and was sent to speak with the school counselor and school psychiatrist as a result. He was an altar boy in the Roman Catholic Church.

Goren's mother Frances (Rita Moreno) first started showing symptoms of schizophrenia when Goren was seven years old. In later years, she is hospitalized at the fictional Carmel Ridge mental health facility. She is then diagnosed with lymphoma which eventually results in her death.

Goren is estranged from his older brother, Frank (Tony Goldwyn), a drug addict who also has a gambling problem and is depicted as being sometimes homeless. Frank has a son, Donny, who asks for help when he is incarcerated. To that end, Goren goes undercover in the prison's psychiatric ward and uncovers a culture of prisoner abuse. While he saves his nephew, he is suspended for his unorthodox investigation. When Frank refuses to help him help Donny, Goren disowns him. While high on drugs, Frank is murdered by Goren's nemesis Nicole Wallace (Olivia d'Abo).

Frances' husband, whom Goren had believed to be his father (see "Mark Ford Brady" section below), gambled frequently on horse races and was a serial adulterer. He left Goren's mother when Goren was 11, making little effort to stay close to the family. In season 2, a personal friend of Goren's mentions a funeral, implying that the elder Goren had died before the series began.

==== Mark Ford Brady ====
In the episode "Endgame", serial killer Mark Ford Brady (Roy Scheider), anxious to delay his scheduled execution, arranges for Goren and Eames to interview him about victims not yet attributed to him. Goren, with help from his brother, pieces together a story which shows that Brady and Frances Goren had an affair, which continued until Robert was four and Frank was seven; the relationship ended after Brady raped and beat Frances within an inch of her life. Goren asks his mother on her deathbed about Brady; she replies that she doesn't know whether Brady is his father.

At a later date, Goren reveals that he has DNA evidence that Brady was his biological father.

=== Military and early police life ===
Goren served in the U.S. Army's Criminal Investigation Division and was stationed in Germany and Korea. He joined the NYPD as a detective, serving in the Narcotics Division, and later as a detective in the Major Case Squad. His mentor, FBI criminal profiler Declan Gage (John Glover), taught him how to use his intelligence, empathy and imagination to construct complex psychological profiles of suspects. Goren also learned how to use his physicality to intimidate and unsettle people while interrogating them, the most famous example being his habit – introduced in the pilot episode, "One" – of cocking his head at odd angles in order to maintain eye contact with someone who is trying to avoid his gaze.

== Major Case Squad ==
In the backstory of Criminal Intent, Goren has been partnered with Det. Alexandra Eames (Kathryn Erbe) since sometime before 2000, posted to the Major Case Squad under Captain James Deakins (Jamey Sheridan) and later Captains Danny Ross (Eric Bogosian) and Joseph Hannah (Jay O. Sanders). Goren is temporarily partnered with Det. G. Lynn Bishop (Samantha Buck) in the third (2003–2004) season while Eames is on maternity leave.

One of his most significant relationships throughout the show is with Nicole Wallace (Olivia d'Abo), a brilliant con artist and serial killer who is first introduced in the episode "Anti-Thesis". Wallace is one of the few criminals Goren encounters who is able to outwit him and even get to him emotionally, particularly by confronting him about his unhappy childhood. Goren comes to think of her as his "white whale". When Wallace murders his brother Frank, Goren is convinced that she is trying to destroy him at last; it turns out, however, that she was manipulated and murdered by the true mastermind of the plot – his old mentor, Declan Gage.

In the episode "Untethered", Goren, on his own, goes undercover at an abusive prison where his nephew Donny (Trevor Morgan) is incarcerated; he is then suspended and sent for a psychological fitness evaluation. While waiting for his reinstatement, Goren decides to go undercover to take down a high-level drug dealer, but does not inform Eames of this decision, causing tension between them.

In the two-part season 9 premiere "Loyalty," he and Eames are pulled off a pair of homicides by Capt. Ross, who they do not realize has been working undercover for the FBI on a case involving one of the victims. When Ross is subsequently murdered, Goren and Eames team up with Detectives Zack Nichols (Jeff Goldblum) and Serena Stevens (Saffron Burrows) to find his killer. Goren soon gets into a physical altercation with the prime suspect, leading to his suspension, though Eames and Nichols covertly help him with his side investigation. By the end of "Loyalty", Eames is promoted to Lieutenant and assigned as Captain (pro tem, pending her Captain's exams) of the Major Case Squad. Her first assignment is to fire Goren. When she tells him what is happening, he tells her not to worry, kisses her on the cheek, and embraces her before he leaves. Eames then places her own gun and badge on her new desk and calls the Chief to resign from the force. Neither Eames nor Goren appear for the remainder of the season.

After a year's absence, Goren and Eames again became the series' lead characters in its tenth and final season, with Eames taking up her original rank of Detective. While it was not explained how or why they were reinstated to the police force, it is clear that one of the conditions is Goren's regular sessions with a psychiatrist, Doctor Paula Gyson (Julia Ormond). Their new captain, Joseph Hannah (Jay O. Sanders), also briefly refers to his and Goren's "friendship", perhaps implying that his character used personal influence in bringing Goren back to the force.

The character of Eames appears in the Law & Order: Special Victims Unit episode "Acceptable Loss." She has again been promoted to Lieutenant and is now serving in the City/Federal Homeland Security Task Force, while Goren has left the Major Case Squad. Eames has picked up some of his old habits, such as cocking her head at an odd angle while interrogating suspects.

== Awards and decorations ==
The following are the medals and service awards worn by Detective Goren, as seen in "Amends". His shield number is 4376.

World Trade Center Breast Bar
NYPD Award of Commendation
NYPD Excellent Police Duty
