= Alexandra Eames =

- Law & Order character
- First appearance: Law & Order: Criminal Intent: September 30, 2001 (episode 1.01: "One")
- Last appearance: Law & Order: Special Victims Unit: May 8, 2013 (episode 14.22: "Poisoned Motive")
- Portrayed by: Kathryn Erbe

In-universe information
- Nickname: Alex
- Title(s): NYPD Detective - Senior (CI); NYPD Lieutenant (SVU)
- Family: Husband: Joseph Dutton (deceased); Father: Jonathon Eames; Siblings: Elizabeth Eames (sister)
- Partner: Robert Goren; Zack Nichols
- Seasons: 1–10 (CI); 14 (SVU)

Alexandra "Alex" Eames is a fictional character within the Law & Order universe portrayed by Kathryn Erbe. Eames first appears on Law & Order: Criminal Intent as a detective partnered with Robert Goren (Vincent D'Onofrio). Following the end of the series in 2011, Erbe reprised her role in two episodes of Law & Order: Special Victims Unit, with her character promoted to lieutenant and now working in the joint City/Federal Homeland Security Task Force.

Erbe received a 2008 Satellite Award Nomination for Best Actress: Television Drama Series for her portrayal. She appeared in 142 episodes.

== Career ==
Eames entered the police academy in 1993. Eames' role model, Senator Maureen Pagolis, spoke at her graduation from the academy. Before joining major case, Eames was with vice unit for five years. For two years of that time, she was stationed in Chelsea. Her badge number is 5798. On one occasion when she is shown in uniform, she is wearing the American flag and citation bars for years of service, Excellent Police Duty, Meritorious Police Duty, and pistol proficiency. On another, she has a button with the World Trade Center's likeness and a unit citation bar, with the flag and the duty bars.

=== In Law & Order: Criminal Intent ===
In Law & Order: Criminal Intent, Eames is a police detective with Manhattan's major case squad. While stationed there, Eames is partnered with Detective Robert Goren and is the senior partner of the two.

In the season six premiere, Eames is kidnapped and tortured by Jo Gage (Martha Plimpton), the daughter of Dr. Declan Gage (John Glover), Goren's mentor. She rescues herself. She returns to duty but starts seeing a therapist to cope with the psychological trauma of her ordeal.

At the end of season six, Eames works a case with Detective Megan Wheeler (Julianne Nicholson) that has ties to Goren's nemesis, Nicole Wallace (Olivia d'Abo). Eames also begins partnering with Detective Zack Nichols (Jeff Goldblum) in the season eight episode "Major Case" after Wheeler, Nichols' regular partner, goes into labor.

In the Season 9 premiere "Loyalty," she and Goren are pulled off a pair of homicides by Capt. Danny Ross (Eric Bogosian), who they do not realize has been working undercover for the FBI on a case involving one of the victims. When Ross is subsequently murdered, Goren and Eames team up with Nichols and Serena Stevens (Saffron Burrows) to find his killer, only to be stonewalled by the FBI. Goren soon gets into a physical altercation with the prime suspect, leading to his suspension and Eames' decision to help him covertly with his side investigation.

==== Partnership with Robert Goren ====
Eames' pragmatic, analytical investigative style and acerbic humor serves as a balance against Goren's often eccentric investigation and interrogation methods. Their working relationship is close and supportive, but there is sometimes tension and conflict between them. Eames and Goren did not see eye-to-eye at first; puzzled by his interrogation methods, she had asked her superior officer for a new partner. She soon learned to appreciate his investigative skill, however, and withdrew the request, all without ever revealing this to Goren. In turn, Goren respects Eames' tenacity and steadiness under pressure.

Although Goren and Eames have never been romantically involved, they both have shown professional and personal loyalty to one another. During Eames' absence due to her maternity leave, Goren makes the connection to a suspect missing his partner and compares his temporary partner G. Lynn Bishop (Samantha Buck) unfavorably to Eames. In the episode "Blind Spot," when Eames is abducted, Goren is in obvious distress over her welfare. When Goren is suspended and decides to go undercover on his own in a prison where his nephew has witnessed abuses, Eames keeps in communication with him and asks for their Captain's help when his plans go awry.

Goren decides to go undercover during his suspension and does not inform Eames of this decision, which causes a considerable conflict between them after his actions come to light. Goren apologizes and states that he wanted to keep Eames away from the situation, but she reacts angrily and replies that his actions were based on selfishness and that "all [his] wounds are self-inflicted." Additionally, when the case of Eames' late husband is reopened (see "Joseph Dutton" section below), Eames is in obvious distress regarding Goren reviewing her late husband's case and tells him that it is "not one of [his] puzzles."

At the end of the two-part Season 9 premiere "Loyalty" dealing with Ross' murder, Eames is offered command of the Major Case Squad on the condition that she fire Goren. She does so, but immediately turns in her badge and gun and quits the NYPD. Neither Eames nor Goren appear for the remainder of the season.

After a year's absence, Eames and Goren again became the series' lead characters for its tenth and final season. No explanation is given for their reinstatement.

=== In Law & Order: Special Victims Unit ===
Eames appeared in the fourteenth season of Law & Order: Special Victims Unit, having been promoted to Lieutenant and assigned to the joint City/Federal Homeland Security Task Force. She appeared in the fourth episode, "Acceptable Loss", as the SVU squad crosses paths with Eames when their investigation of a sex trafficking ring uncovers a connection to a terrorism case on which Eames is working. She tells the detectives to stand down and briefs them on her investigation. After SVU goes forward with their prostitution investigation, Eames blames SVU for making her lose her target. When Detective Olivia Benson (Mariska Hargitay) realizes that one of the alleged prostitutes was connected to the terrorism plot, Captain Don Cragen (Dann Florek) calls Eames in, and Benson pleads with her to let them work the raid with her. Eames agrees, and together they foil the terrorism plot. At the end of the episode, Benson asks Eames why she tilts her head at suspects while interrogating them, and Eames responds that it was something her former partner (presumably Goren) taught her. She briefly mentions that her partner moved on after 11 years of working together, and for her it was also time for a change. Eames returns to help SVU track down a sniper who injured Detective Amanda Rollins (Kelli Giddish) in the episode "Poisoned Motive".

== Personal and family life ==
Eames joined the NYPD to follow in the footsteps of her father, Johnny Eames, also a police officer. Eames' younger brother has three children in private school, is part of the FDNY, and is married to a nurse. After their aunt hit Eames' brother, Eames said they never saw her again. In "Vacancy", a suspect senses her anger towards alcoholics and uses her vulnerability to sabotage the case against him. In "The Last Street in Manhattan", Eames indicates that she grew up and went to elementary school in the Inwood section of Manhattan. She also takes care of her elderly father, who still lives there and complains that she has given him no grandchildren. Eames jokes that her father has "Irish Alzheimer's" – meaning he only remembers grudges.

In the third season, Eames volunteers to serve as a surrogate mother for her sister's baby, a storyline intended to coincide with Kathryn Erbe's real life pregnancy, as the unmarried Eames had no onscreen romantic attachments. She gives birth to a boy, with whom she has a close relationship.

She enjoys Danish pastry, mentioning it in at least two episodes.

=== Joseph Dutton ===
Eames is widowed. In an interview with the Chicago Tribune in 2001, Erbe said of Eames, "Her husband was a cop who was killed in the line of duty. None of this you will probably hear in the show." However, in the 2006 episode "The War at Home" and in subsequent episodes, the scripts reveal that her husband Joseph Dutton was killed in 1998. In the season seven premiere "Amends" Dutton's case is reopened, and she and Goren discover that the wrong man had been convicted; DNA evidence points to another suspect whom she and Goren subsequently arrest.

== Awards and decorations ==
Following are the medals and service awards worn by then-Detective Eames in "Loyalty" (2010). In the episode "Amends" (2007), she is missing the WTC Breast Bar but is wearing a Years of Service White Citation Bar showing XXV for 25 years of service (should actually show XIV for 14 years since joining the force in 1993).

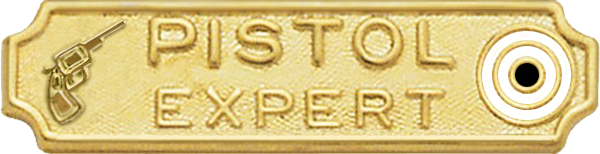
American Flag Breast Bar
World Trade Center Breast Bar
NYPD Meritorious Police Duty
NYPD Excellent Police Duty
NYPD Firearms Proficiency Bar
