= Law & Order: Criminal Intent =

American television series (2001–2011)

- Also known as: Law & Order: CI; Criminal Intent; CI
- Genre: Police procedural; Drama
- Created by: Dick Wolf
- Developed by: René Balcer
- Showrunners: René Balcer; Warren Leight; Walon Green; Ed Zuckerman; Michael S. Chernuchin; Robert Nathan; Chris Brancato
- Starring: Vincent D'Onofrio; Kathryn Erbe; Jamey Sheridan; Courtney B. Vance; Chris Noth; Annabella Sciorra; Julianne Nicholson; Eric Bogosian; Alicia Witt; Jeff Goldblum; Saffron Burrows; Mary Elizabeth Mastrantonio; Jay O. Sanders
- Narrated by: Steven Zirnkilton (opening only)
- Opening theme: "Theme of Law & Order: Criminal Intent"; "Theme of Law & Order: Trial by Jury"; ”Theme of Law & Order: Toronto Criminal Intent”
- Composer: Mike Post
- Country of origin: United States
- Original language: English
- No. of seasons: 10
- No. of episodes: 195 (list of episodes)

Production
- Executive producers: Dick Wolf; Peter Jankowski; Fred Berner; Norberto Barba; John David Coles
- Producer: John L. Roman
- Camera setup: Panavision; single-camera
- Running time: approx. 43 minutes (per episode)
- Production companies: Wolf Entertainment; Universal Media Studios (seasons 1–7) (Note: Also credited as Studios USA Television (season 1), Universal Network Television (seasons 2–3) and NBC Universal Television Studio (seasons 4–6).); Universal Cable Productions (seasons 8–10)

Original release
- Network: NBC
- Release: September 30, 2001 – May 21, 2007
- Network: USA Network
- Release: October 4, 2007 – June 26, 2011

Related
- Law & Order franchise; Paris enquêtes criminelles; In Plain Sight; Law & Order Toronto: Criminal Intent

Law & Order: Criminal Intent is an American police procedural drama television series set in New York City, where it was also primarily produced. Created and produced by Dick Wolf and René Balcer, the series premiered on September 30, 2001, as the third series in Wolf's successful Law & Order franchise. Criminal Intent focuses on the investigations of the major case squad in a fictionalized version of the New York City Police Department set in New York City's One Police Plaza. In the style of the original Law & Order, episodes are often "ripped from the headlines" or loosely based on a real crime that received media attention.

The series aired on NBC for the first six seasons but was moved to the NBCUniversal-owned USA Network starting with the seventh season to share costs and due to declining ratings. During its NBC run, each episode aired on USA the week after its original NBC airing. The 10th and final season premiered on Sunday, May 1, 2011, at 9 p.m. EDT with original cast members Vincent D'Onofrio and Kathryn Erbe starring as Detectives Robert Goren and Alexandra Eames, respectively, and featuring Jay O. Sanders as Captain Joseph Hannah. The series concluded on June 26, 2011, after 10 seasons comprising 195 episodes.

== Premise ==
In New York City's war on crime, the worst criminal offenders are pursued by the detectives of the Major Case Squad. These are their stories.

— Opening narration spoken by Steven Zirnkilton

Criminal Intent follows The NYPD Manhattan "Major Case Squad", a force of detectives who investigate high-profile cases (in most cases, murder, kidnappings or major robberies), such as those involving VIPs, local government officials and employees, the financial industry, and the art world.

This series in the franchise is notable for its heavy focus on the motives and actions of the criminals, paralleling the investigation with scenes of the suspects' lives that show the audience circumstances that the investigators can, at most, only attempt to deduce. Each episode features a cold open of the victim and suspects in (at most) a few days leading up to the crime; these scenes are presented without context, and maintain suspense as to the perpetrator's identity and often motive, until the ensuing investigation reveals these. However, some episodes reveal the offender at the start, while leaving out other key details and presenting a puzzle, over which the detectives labor, and agonize, to discover; thereby they provide the plot conflict of the episode, and (usually) the resolution of the case: solving the crime, and (likewise) insinuating a plea, or verdict, of "guilty". Occasionally, however, either the detectives resign themselves to conviction being infeasible—or an acquittal or dismissal dramatizes the limits of criminal prosecution. Unlike other Law & Order series, most Criminal Intent episodes end with the detectives eliciting confessions, rather than continuing to the trial phase.

Seasons 1–4 (and 10) focus on Detectives Robert "Bobby" Goren and Alexandra Eames as the primary detectives in every episode. In seasons 5–8, the episodes then typically alternate between that team, and one composed of veteran Detective Michael "Mike" Logan and three female colleagues, Carolyn Barek in Season 5, Megan Wheeler in Season 6, and later episodes of Season 7, and Nola Falacci, in early episodes of Season 7. After season 7, Mike Logan retires from the NYPD, and 8 and 9 feature Detective Zack Nichols (Jeff Goldblum), paired with Wheeler (and occasionally Eames) in Season 8; and Serena Stevens in Season 9. In season 10, the Goren and Eames characters returned as lead characters.

The UK-aired version of Law & Order: Criminal Intent features the song "There's Only Me" by Rob Dougan in the opening credits (seasons 1–5). (Another Rob Dougan track, "I'm Not Driving Anymore", is used as the theme music for Law & Order and Law & Order: Special Victims Unit.) From season 6 of the UK-aired version, the theme music is "Urban Warfare" by Paul Dinletir.

== History ==
Law & Order: Criminal Intent was created in 2001 by René Balcer and Dick Wolf. Balcer served as the show's executive producer, showrunner, and head writer for its first five seasons. The show dominated its original time slot on Sundays at 9:00 p.m. for its first three seasons (routinely beating its competition, ABC's Alias and HBO's The Sopranos, in households and in the 18–49 demographic), and was often the highest-rated show of the night, with an average audience of 15.5 million viewers. The show aired Sundays on NBC, with each week's episode being repeated on USA Network the following Saturday.

Beginning in season 4, it faced stiff new competition from ABC's night-time soap opera Desperate Housewives, a show that soon became the No. 1 drama on television. Although ratings for Criminal Intent further eroded in season 5 amid stiff competition, the series maintained respectable ratings through the season, enough to get it renewed for a sixth season on NBC.

Balcer left the show at the end of season 5, and the show was handed off to Warren Leight, a longtime Criminal Intent staffer. Under Leight's leadership, the show acquired a new, more melodramatic tone.

When NBC had acquired the rights to Sunday Night Football for the 2006–2007 season, Law & Order: Criminal Intent was moved to a new time slot on Tuesdays at 9:00 p.m., to serve as a lead-in to fellow Law & Order spin-off, Law & Order: Special Victims Unit. For its first five airings, it faced CBS's The Unit and baseball on Fox. In late October, Fox's hit series House moved opposite Law & Order: Criminal Intent.

In May 2007, NBC faced a choice of renewing either Criminal Intent or the original Law & Order, which had seen a ratings increase in the last few episodes of its 17th season. Ultimately, because of Criminal Intent's weak ratings, NBC picked up Law & Order. Criminal Intent's new episodes were moved to the NBCUniversal-owned USA Network, where it could be expected to attract a much larger audience than the cable channel's average. The remaining episodes from the seventh season began running on June 8, 2008. Production on the show was halted temporarily in December 2007 due to the writers' strike.

For its move to the USA Network, the version of the Law & Order theme used for the show's opening credits was replaced by the version originally used on the short-lived Law & Order: Trial by Jury.

On May 22, 2008, USA Network renewed Criminal Intent for an eighth season. Season 7 was the top-rated television series on basic cable, having more than quadrupled the audience for the 10 p.m. Thursday slot on USA Network when compared to the ratings from the previous year. Nielsen ratings for the week of July 13, 2008 showed that Criminal Intent was ranked sixth overall on top 20 cable ratings, with a viewer base of 4.899 million viewers. The network ordered 16 episodes, which were originally to begin broadcasting in November 2008, but the network moved the premiere back, first to February 5, 2009, then with an expected date of spring–summer 2009, and finally announcing the start date as April 19. The only change in cast members from the seventh season was Chris Noth's departure and replacement by Jeff Goldblum. At the end of season 7, Leight, who left to focus on In Treatment, was replaced by new executive producers Walon Green and Robert Nathan. In December 2008, Nathan left the show after completing two Goldblum episodes. Law & Order co-executive producer and writer Ed Zuckerman then picked up Nathan's assignment while continuing his duties for the original Law & Order's 19th season. Michael Chernuchin co-executive produced Green's episodes, and Tim Lea co-executive produced Zuckerman's episodes. Other executive producers on the series were Norberto Barba, Peter Jankowski, Diana Son, Julie Martin, and Arthur W. Forney. Charlie Rubin was the supervising producer, and Balcer, Eric Overmyer, and Siobhan Byrne O'Connor were consulting producers. In April 2009, NBC began airing Law & Order: Criminal Intent season 8 encores a few days after they premiered on USA.

D'Onofrio, Erbe, and Bogosian left the series in the season 9 premiere, which aired in two parts on March 30 and April 6, 2010. Walon Green, Peter Jankowski, John David Coles, and Dick Wolf were the executive producers for the ninth season of Criminal Intent.

Media outlets reported in August 2010 that actor Jeff Goldblum (Detective Zachary Nichols) had decided to leave the cast of Law & Order: CI, citing concerns about the show's future. The option to return on all the actors formally expired on July 31, 2010 after being extended by a month on June 30, 2010 when they were originally up. A final decision by the USA Network over whether the series would be renewed for another season had not been announced at that time.

On September 22, 2010, Variety announced that Criminal Intent had been renewed, and that Vincent D'Onofrio would be returning to the series as Detective Robert Goren for its final season. Kathryn Erbe subsequently signed on to reprise the role of Detective Eames for the eight-episode final season of Law & Order: Criminal Intent. Chris Brancato was announced as the executive producer/showrunner for the final eight-episode season of Law & Order: CI. Brancato succeeded Walon Green, who served as the showrunner during the eighth and ninth seasons.

Prior to the season premiere, creator Dick Wolf was hoping the series would be renewed for an 11th season, versus ending with season 10. "Being the unbridled optimist that I am, I still have hope that this is a 'victory lap' and not a 'swan song,'" Wolf said during a conference call. "Based on the work so far, I think the audience is going to be very happy, relieved, and welcoming ... and hopefully enough fans will come out so the powers-that-be reconsider their decision." New showrunner/EP Chris Brancato suggested that the show could be picked up for an 11th season if the intended final episodes garnered sufficient ratings. The tenth season ended on June 26, 2011, and USA Network announced the following month that they were choosing not to air more episodes of the series due to costs. When asked if LOCI would be taken back by NBC, Wolf tweeted, "USA Network decided not to pick up #LOCI for another season. We hoped ratings & fans could change their mind but. ... I've learned to never say never but most execs are looking for something new. We truly appreciate our loyal fans! Thank you."

In August 2012, it was announced that Kathryn Erbe would be playing her character Alexandra Eames again in Law & Order: Special Victims Unit's fourteenth season. Detective Eames transferred out of Major Case, and is now working for a joint City/Federal Homeland Security Task Force, and crosses paths with the SVU squad when their investigation of a sex trafficking ring uncovers a connection to terrorists. Warren Leight, who now is showrunner and executive producer on Law & Order: SVU, tweeted that Erbe's first episode would be the fourth of the season, "Acceptable Loss". Erbe later returned to guest star again in the fourteenth season of SVU in the episode "Poisoned Motive".

In February 2013, Warren Leight further tweeted on Criminal Intent's ending, "... simply put, USA didn't make enough money on LOCI to justify even the final 8 [episodes] they did. they felt they owed it to the fans. ... And they certainly showed LOCI more loyalty than NBC did the Mothership." Leight further tweeted, "I think fans should enjoy the long run we had, and maybe hope for a MadeForTV movie if anyone ever makes those in future."

Starting September 2017, series lead Vincent D'Onofrio (Detective Goren), showrunner/executive producer Warren Leight, Julie Martin, and director and executive producer Norberto Barba have begun using their Twitter accounts to re-tweet tweets aimed at ION Television with the hashtag: #BringBackLOCI. Season seven co-star Alicia Witt (Detective Falacci) also sent a re-tweeted reply to a tweet that praised her portrayal and her character, saying, "Aww thank you. I have always wanted to revisit Falacci one day- loved being there during JN's [Julianne Nicholson's] maternity leave but want to play her again!"

=== Broadcast history ===
The show originally aired on Sunday nights at 9:00 p.m. ET on NBC for the first five seasons, from September 30, 2001 through May 14, 2006. It was then shifted to Tuesday nights at 9 p.m. ET on September 19, 2006, and remained in that timeslot through the end of season 6 on May 21, 2007. CI was then moved to the USA Network for its 7th season and aired Thursday nights at 9:00 p.m. starting October 4, 2007 until the fall finale in December 2007. It was then moved to Sunday nights at 9:00 p.m. ET on June 8, 2008 (when it paired up with In Plain Sight) until the 8th-season finale on August 9, 2009. For the ninth season only, the series moved to a new day and timeslot, Tuesday nights at 10:00 p.m. ET. During the tenth and final season, the series went back to Sundays at 9:00 p.m. ET on USA Network.

After the show moved to USA, NBC re-aired episodes from the most recent season during the summer months. Reruns also air frequently on Bravo, USA Network, Universal HD, WGN America, Cloo, Oxygen, Ion Television, MyNetworkTV, WE tv, Sundance TV, BBC America, Charge!, and in syndication on local stations.

=== Streaming ===
Since mid-2020, selected seasons of Law & Order: Criminal Intent have been available for streaming on Peacock along with Chicago Fire, Chicago P.D., Chicago Med, Law & Order and Law & Order: Special Victims Unit.

== Cast and characters ==
Name	Portrayed by	Occupation	Season									
Name	Portrayed by	Occupation	1	2	3	4	5	6	7	8	9	10
Senior Detectives
Alexandra Eames	Kathryn Erbe	Senior Detective	Main								(Note: Vincent D'Onofrio and Kathryn Erbe appeared in only the first two episodes of season 9.)	Main
Mike Logan	Chris Noth	Senior Detective				Guest	Main					
Zack Nichols	Jeff Goldblum	Senior Detective								Main		
Junior Detectives
Robert Goren	Vincent D'Onofrio	Junior Detective	Main									Main
Carolyn Barek	Annabella Sciorra	Junior Detective					Main					
Megan Wheeler	Julianne Nicholson	Junior Detective						Main				
Nola Falacci	Alicia Witt	Junior Detective							Main			
Serena Stevens	Saffron Burrows	Junior Detective									Main	
Commanding Officers
James Deakins	Jamey Sheridan	Captain	Main									
Danny Ross	Eric Bogosian	Captain						Main			(Note: Eric Bogosian appeared in only the first episode of season 9.)	
Zoe Callas	Mary Elizabeth Mastrantonio	Captain									Main	
Joseph Hannah	Jay O. Sanders	Captain										Also starring
Assistant District Attorneys
Ron Carver	Courtney B. Vance	A.D.A.	Main									
Psychiatrists
Paula Gyson	Julia Ormond	Police Psychiatrist										Also starring

=== Seasons 1–2 ===
On September 30, 2001, NBC premiered the show, starring Vincent D'Onofrio as Detective Robert Goren, a junior detective in the Major Case Squad who has a degree in psychology and has a knack for solving difficult crimes, and Kathryn Erbe as his partner, Detective Alexandra Eames, a veteran captain from an NYPD family who initially resists her partner's eccentric style, but grows to understand him as the series progresses. Before joining the NYPD Goren was a Special Agent with the United States Army's Criminal Investigations Division. Jamey Sheridan plays detective James Deakins; although Deakins's first priority is the success of criminal investigations, he is often forced to rein in and protect his more maverick detectives, especially Goren and later Logan, to manage the bad publicity they occasionally attract. While this creates some friction between Deakins and his detectives, for the most part they respect his professional judgment and authority. Courtney B. Vance's Assistant District Attorney Ron Carver is frequently in conflict with all the detectives because they tend to rely on hunches and instinct, when he wants more hard evidence. Despite this conflict, however, he has a strong working relationship with both teams.

=== Season 3 ===
In the third season, from episodes 5–11, Eames is temporarily replaced by Detective G. Lynn Bishop portrayed by Samantha Buck. Eames is volunteering to serve as a surrogate mother for her sister-in-law's baby; in reality, Erbe was pregnant with her second child.

=== Seasons 4–5 ===
In the fifth season, Chris Noth joined the cast, reprising his role as Detective Mike Logan from the original Law & Order. Noth alternates the starring role every other episode with D'Onofrio, and is partnered with Annabella Sciorra as Detective Carolyn Barek. Sciorra left after one season.

Deakins retires from the Major Case Squad at the end of Season 5 rather than battle a conspiracy to frame him instigated by former Chief of Detectives Frank Adair, whom Major Case detectives have arrested for killing a female acquaintance and her husband. Carver leaves as well, though there is no explanation as to why he departed the ADA's office.

=== Seasons 6–9 ===
Deakins was replaced by Captain Danny Ross (Eric Bogosian). Carver was initially replaced by ADA Patricia Kent (Theresa Randle), although she appears in only two episodes. The ADA role from this point on is left vacant, as the detectives aren't shown working with any ADA on a regular basis.

Julianne Nicholson replaced Annabella Sciorra as Detective Megan Wheeler, who remains with the show through the end of the eighth season.

In season 7, Wheeler temporarily leaves MCS to go to Europe, where she teaches a course on American police procedure. In reality, Julianne Nicholson was pregnant with her first child and was replaced temporarily by Alicia Witt, playing Detective Nola Falacci.

Noth left the series at the end of season seven. He was replaced by Jeff Goldblum as Detective Zack Nichols. The series was renewed for a ninth season, which began in March 2010 and marked the departure of D'Onofrio, Erbe, and Bogosian. Ross is murdered in the first half of the season premiere, while Eames fires Goren in the second half and then quits the NYPD. Goldblum was the head of the series with new partner Detective Serena Stevens, played by Saffron Burrows. Mary Elizabeth Mastrantonio succeeded Bogosian, portraying Captain Zoe Callas.

=== Season 10 ===
The final season featured the return of Detectives Alex Eames and Robert Goren, replacing outgoing Zack Nichols and Serena Stevens who made their final appearances in the season 9 finale. Eames and Goren are brought back at the request of Joseph Hannah, played by Jay O. Sanders, the new Major Case Captain who replaced Zoe Callas, on the condition that Goren attend mandatory psych sessions with brilliant police doctor Paula Gyson, played by Julia Ormond. The final season consisted of eight episodes, all featuring D'Onofrio, Erbe and Sanders.

== Seasons ==
Law & Order: Criminal Intent's seasons 1–5 aired on NBC on Sunday nights at 9 p.m. EST. Season 6 aired on NBC on Tuesday nights at 9 p.m. EST and the last two episodes in May on Monday nights at 10 p.m. EST. In October 2007, new episodes of season 7 aired on the USA Network on Thursday nights at 9 p.m. EST. In June 2008, the remaining episodes of the seventh season until the end of the eighth season aired on Sunday nights at 9 p.m. EST on USA. Starting on January 9, 2008, reruns of season 7 began airing on NBC and on May 6, 2009, reruns of season 8 began airing on NBC. Criminal Intent's season finale aired August 9, 2009. On June 20, 2010, reruns of season 9 began airing on Sunday nights on NBC. The show moved to Tuesday nights at 10 p.m. EST on USA as of the ninth season which premiered on March 30, 2010 and ended July 6, 2010. The show returned to Sunday nights at 9 p.m. EST on USA for the tenth and final season when it premiered May 1, 2011.

== Episodes ==
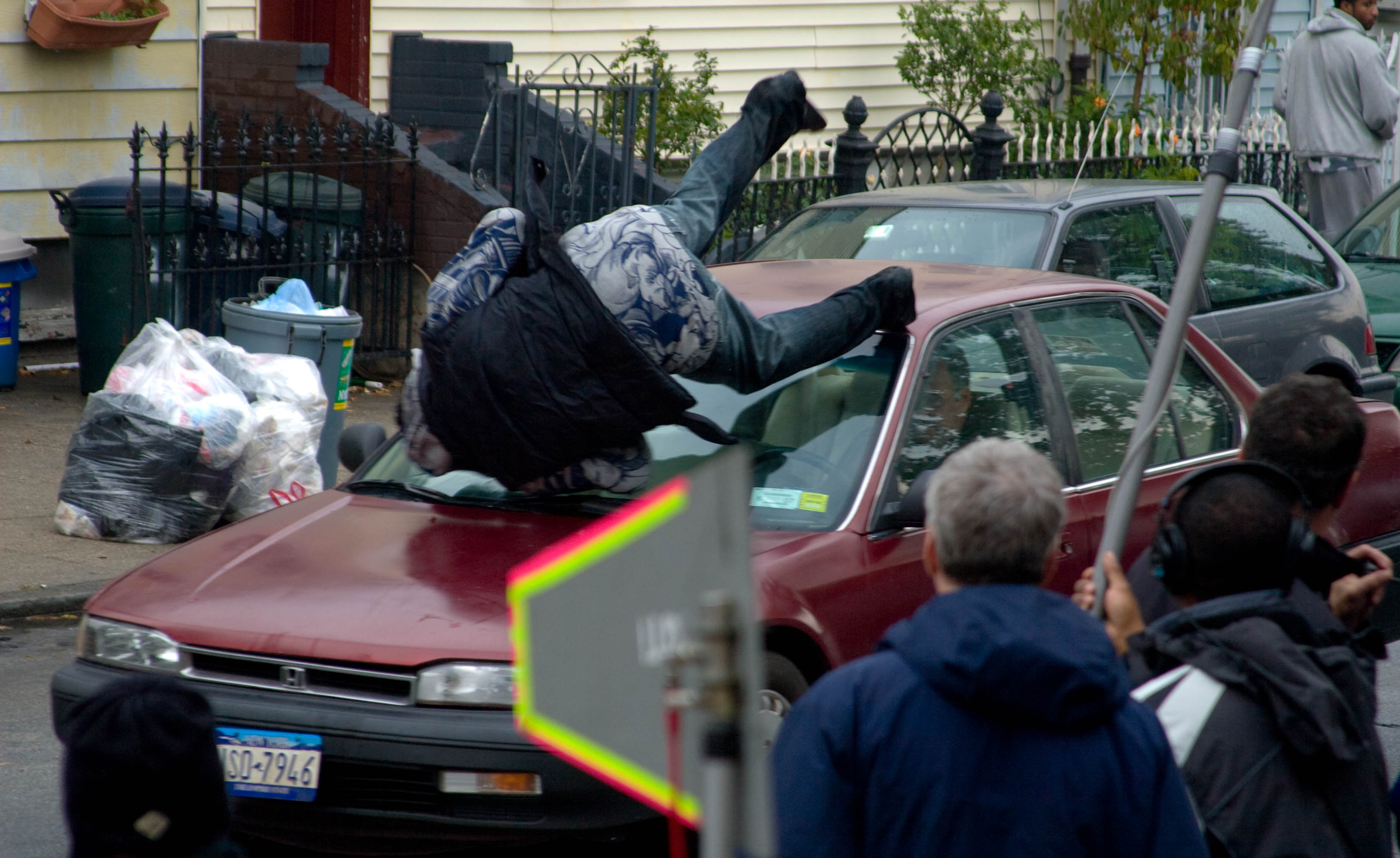
An episode being filmed in November 2007

Law & Order: Criminal Intent aired for ten seasons and 195 episodes, which aired between September 30, 2001 and June 26, 2011. Seasons one through seven each consisted of 21 to 23 episodes, seasons eight and nine each consisted of 16, and season ten consisted of 8; each episode lasts approximately sixty minutes including commercials (approx. 43 without commercials).

Season	Episodes	Originally released			Rank	Viewers (in millions)
Season	Episodes	First released	Last released	Network	Rank	Viewers (in millions)
1	22	September 30, 2001	May 10, 2002	NBC	34	11.9
2	23	September 29, 2002	May 18, 2003	NBC	20	14.3
3	21	September 28, 2003	May 23, 2004	NBC	20	12.8
4	23	September 26, 2004	May 25, 2005	NBC	28	12.1
5	22	September 25, 2005	May 14, 2006	NBC	38	11.0
6	22	September 19, 2006	May 21, 2007	NBC	59	8.8
7	22	October 4, 2007	August 24, 2008	USA	91	7.46
8	16	April 19, 2009	August 9, 2009	USA	107	5.40
9	16	March 30, 2010	July 6, 2010	USA	—N/a	3.50
10	8	May 1, 2011	June 26, 2011	USA	—N/a	4.43

== Awards/nominations ==
Year	Group	Award	Result	Recipient(s)
2002	PPFA Maggie Awards	Maggie Award for Media Excellence ("The Third Horseman")	Won	
2002	People's Choice Award	Best New Series	Nominated	
2002	Image Award	Outstanding Actor in a Drama Series	Nominated	Courtney B. Vance
2003	Edgar Award	Best Television Episode	Nominated	René Balcer for "Tuxedo Hill"
2004	Satellite Award	Best Actor in a Series, Drama	Nominated	Vincent D'Onofrio
2004	Edgar Award	Best Episode in a Television Series Teleplay	Nominated	René Balcer and Gerry Conway, for "Probability"
2005	Edgar Award	Best Episode in a Television Series Teleplay	Won	René Balcer and Elizabeth Benjamin, for "Want"
2005	Edgar Award	Best Episode in a Television Series Teleplay	Nominated	René Balcer and Gerry Conway, for "Conscience"; René Balcer and Warren Leight, for "Consumed"; René Balcer and Warren Leight, for "Pas de Deux"
2006	Reims International Television Festival	Best Drama Episode ("In the Wee Small Hours")	Nominated	
2006	Banff Television Award	Best Drama ("In The Wee Small Hours")	Nominated	
2006	ALMA Award	Outstanding Director of a Television Drama or Comedy	Nominated	Norberto Barba
2008	Edgar Award	Best Television Episode Teleplay	Nominated	Warren Leight, Siobhan Byrne, & Julie Martin for "Senseless"
2008	Image Award	Outstanding Directing in a Drama Series	Nominated	Darnell Martin for "Bombshell"
2008	Satellite Award	Best Actress in a Series, Drama	Nominated	Kathryn Erbe
2008	ALMA Award	Outstanding Director of a Television Drama or Comedy	Nominated	Norberto Barba

== Home media ==
Universal Studios Home Entertainment has released Law & Order: Criminal Intent on DVD in Regions 1, 2 and 4. Seasons 1–5 have been released in both Region 2 and Region 4.

In April 2012, it was announced that Shout! Factory had acquired the rights to the series in Region 1. They subsequently released season 7 on DVD on June 26, 2012. Season 8 was released on October 23, 2012 with Season 9 on December 11, 2012 and Season 10 on March 12, 2013. The complete series is currently exclusively streaming through premium plans on NBC's streaming service Peacock. Law & Order: Criminal Intent can now be seen on the Charge! (TV network).

DVD name	Ep#	Release dates		
DVD name	Ep#	Region 1	Region 2	Region 4
The 1st Year	22	October 21, 2003	February 28, 2005	January 20, 2005
The 2nd Year	23	December 12, 2006	July 17, 2006	March 7, 2006
The 3rd Year	21	September 14, 2004	April 13, 2009	June 3, 2009
The 4th Year	23	November 24, 2009	December 28, 2009	December 2, 2009
The 5th Year	22	May 18, 2010	August 16, 2010	September 29, 2010
The 6th Year	22	June 28, 2011	N/A	August 3, 2016
The 7th Year	22	June 26, 2012	N/A	August 3, 2016
The 8th Year	15	October 23, 2012	N/A	August 3, 2016
The 9th Year	16	December 11, 2012	N/A	October 5, 2016
The Final Year (The 10th Year)	8	March 12, 2013	N/A	October 5, 2016
The Complete Series	194	N/A	N/A	November 16, 2016

- Region 2 dates refer to United Kingdom releases only
- Due to content issues stemming from the Season 8 episode, "The Glory That Was ...", only 15 episodes from Season 8 will be on the DVD set.

== Technical information ==
Law & Order: Criminal Intent had been produced in 16:9 format since late 2003, when it was first broadcast in HDTV. Standard definition NBC stations aired the episodes cropped to 4:3 until 2006, when all Law & Order series began airing episodes in 16:9 for SD. Reruns of those episodes which were cropped to 4:3 have subsequently been aired in 16:9 as well. Some broadcasters outside the U.S., however, still use versions cropped to 4:3.

The show was recorded on 3-perf 35mm film with the use of motion cameras for the first eight seasons. The series' on-set lighting was very dim in its first five seasons. In the sixth season, scenes on set were brightened, and remained that way until season eight. At the commencement of season nine, the camera department switched to digital video acquisition. The lighting in the MCS squad room also received a significant change. The series has always relied heavily on color corrected fluorescent lighting which contributed to its drab and bluish look. At the beginning of season nine, sections of the MCS ceiling were removed and banks of incandescent lighting strips were added to steepen the warmer, sunny day look of the drab squad room. In the tenth season, the lighting in interrogation room senses were brightened to their color in the sixth and seventh seasons.

Starting with the sixth season, the editing style changed, moving away from the style of the other shows in the Law & Order franchise (examples: zooms, colors, and thud sounds used to quickly fade to commercials, quick brightening effects and sharp sounds to show scene changes) and the tempo of the background music was amplified and at a faster pace.

== Related series ==
=== Crossovers ===
==== To Law & Order: Criminal Intent ====
During the first season of Law & Order: Criminal Intent (L&O: CI), several cast members from the original series made guest appearances as their Law & Order (L&O) characters. Dianne Wiest appeared in the first episode of the series, "One", Jerry Orbach and Jesse L. Martin guest starred in the episode "Poison", S. Epatha Merkerson appeared in the episode "Badge", and J. K. Simmons appeared in the episode "Crazy".

Leslie Hendrix also reprises her L&O role as Medical Examiner Dr. Elizabeth Rodgers as a recurring character throughout the run of the series starting with the first-season episode "The Faithful".

In 2005, Chris Noth reprised his L&O role as Detective Mike Logan for the show's fourth season. This appearance led to Noth joining the cast in the fifth season, appearing in the starring role for half the episodes of the season. Noth remained with the show for three seasons before departing in 2008.

Also appearing in their roles from L&O, during L&O: CI's fifth season, were Fred Dalton Thompson in the episode "In the Wee Small Hours: Part 2" and Carolyn McCormick in the episode "To the Bone".

On June 15, 2008, Mary McCormack made a guest appearance in the seventh season episode "Contract", as Mary Shannon, her character from In Plain Sight. At the time of the original airing, In Plain Sight followed L&O: CI on the USA Network.

==== From Law & Order: Criminal Intent ====
In the 14th season of Law & Order: Special Victims Unit (L&O: SVU), Kathryn Erbe reprised her role as Alexandra Eames in the episodes "Acceptable Loss" and "Poisoned Motive". Also, in this L&O: SVU season, Denis O'Hare guest starred as his character Father Shea from the Criminal Intent episode "Last Rites" for the L&O: SVU episode "Presumed Guilty".

Jo, a 2013 series created by René Balcer, featured Olivia d'Abo reprising her role as Nicole Wallace in its last episode.

In the 22nd season of L&O: SVU, Annabella Sciorra reprised her role as Detective (now Lieutenant) Carolyn Barek in the episode "Hunt, Trap, Rape, and Release".

=== French adaptation ===
In July 2005, NBC Universal sold the format of Law & Order: Criminal Intent to French channel TF1 Alma Productions to create a French remake of the show. The show mirrors the content of the original American stories, although it is set in Paris and is adjusted for language and culture. The show ran for 20 episodes over three seasons between May 2007 to November 2008.

=== Russian adaptation ===
A Russian version of L&O: CI (shot in Moscow with Russian actors) premiered in March 2007, where it was shown back-to-back with the Russian version of Law & Order: Special Victims Unit, to become one of Russia's top-rated series. As a result, the initial order of eight episodes has been expanded to some 40 episodes. The show is entitled Закон и порядок. Преступный умысел (translation: Law & Order: Criminal Intent).

=== Canadian adaptation ===
On February 22, 2024 a Canadian adaptation of L&O: CI named Law & Order Toronto: Criminal Intent premiered on Canadian television network Citytv. It was renewed for two more seasons in June 2024.

== See also ==
- List of television shows filmed in New York City
