= Law & Order: Criminal Intent season 8 =

Season of American television series

Law & Order: Criminal Intent
- Season 8
- Season 8 U.S. DVD cover
- No. of episodes: 16

Release
- Original network: USA Network
- Original release: April 19 – August 9, 2009

Season chronology
- ← Previous; Season 7 Next → Season 9

The eighth season of Law & Order: Criminal Intent premiered on the USA Network in the United States on April 19, 2009. It consisted of sixteen episodes, and concluded on August 9, 2009. The day following each episode's broadcast on television, they are made available to purchase and download from the iTunes Store. Law & Order: Criminal Intent is an American police procedural television series set and filmed in New York City. It is the second spin-off of the long-running crime drama Law & Order, and was created by Dick Wolf and René Balcer. Law & Order: Criminal Intent follows the New York City Police Department's Major Case Squad, which investigates high-profile murder cases.

Season eight starred Vincent D'Onofrio as Detective Robert Goren, Kathryn Erbe as Detective Alexandra Eames, Julianne Nicholson as Detective Megan Wheeler, and Eric Bogosian as Captain Danny Ross. Jeff Goldblum joined the cast as Detective Zack Nichols. The season was executive produced by the following teams: Walon Green and Michael Chernuchin; Ed Zuckerman and Tim Lea; Dick Wolf and Peter Jankowski; and Norberto Barba, Diana Son, Julie Martin, and Arthur W. Forney.

== Production ==
Law & Order: Criminal Intent is the third series in the crime drama Law & Order franchise, which was created by Dick Wolf in 1990. It was developed by Wolf and René Balcer, who began working on the original Law & Order series during its first season. Law & Order: Criminal Intent is a police procedural crime drama that follows a distinct division of the New York City Police Department: the Major Case Squad, and its investigations into high-profile murder cases, such as those involving VIPs, local government officials and employees, the financial industry, and the art world. Unlike the other series in the Law & Order franchise, Law & Order: Criminal Intent gives significant attention to the actions and motives of the criminals, rather than primarily focusing on the police investigation and trial prosecution. Episodes do not usually contain trials, and often end in confessions rather than plea bargains or verdicts.

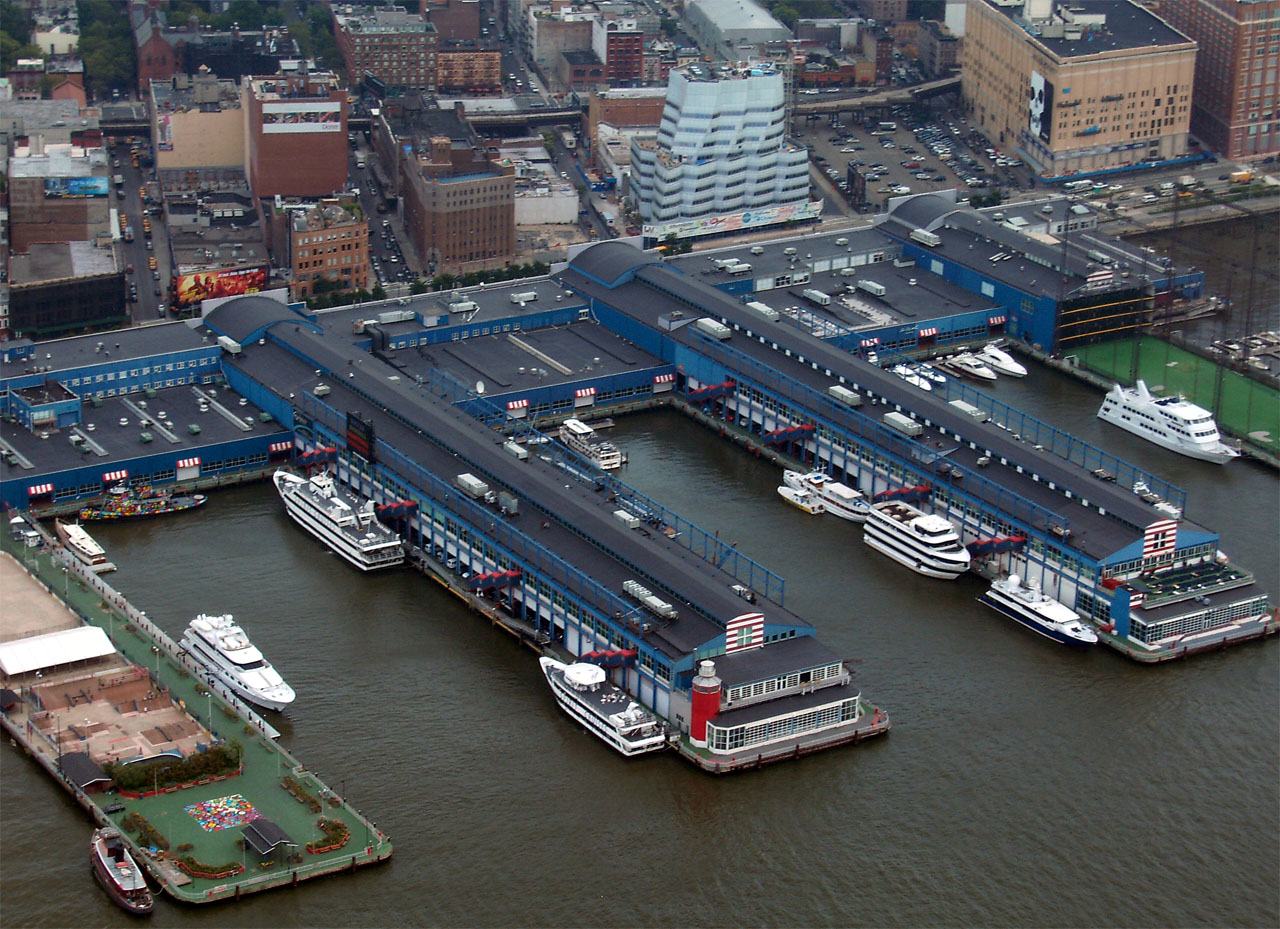
The Silver Screen Studios soundstages at Chelsea Piers, Manhattan, contains the set used to depict One Police Plaza, the real headquarters of the NYPD.

USA Network made a sixteen-episode order for season eight on May 22, 2008, down from the twenty-two episodes of season seven. Production for season eight began at the end of the summer of 2008, shooting on location in and around New York City using local color. The main set of One Police Plaza is located in the Silver Screen Studios soundstages at Chelsea Piers, Manhattan.

Following the departure of Warren Leight, who served as show runner, executive producer, and head writer in seasons six and seven, it was announced in July 2008 that Walon Green and Robert Nathan would share Leight's role for the forthcoming eighth season, handling eight episodes each; however, after making two episodes, Nathan was replaced by Law & Order executive producer Ed Zuckerman. Michael Chernuchin co-executive produces Green's episodes, and Tim Lea co-executive produces Zuckerman's episodes. Wolf and Peter Jankowski are also credited as executive producers, as with all other Law & Order series. Other executive producers on the series are Norberto Barba, Diana Son, Julie Martin, and Arthur W. Forney. Charlie Rubin is credited as the supervising producer, and Balcer, Eric Overmyer, and Siobhan Byrne O'Connor are consulting producers.

== Cast ==
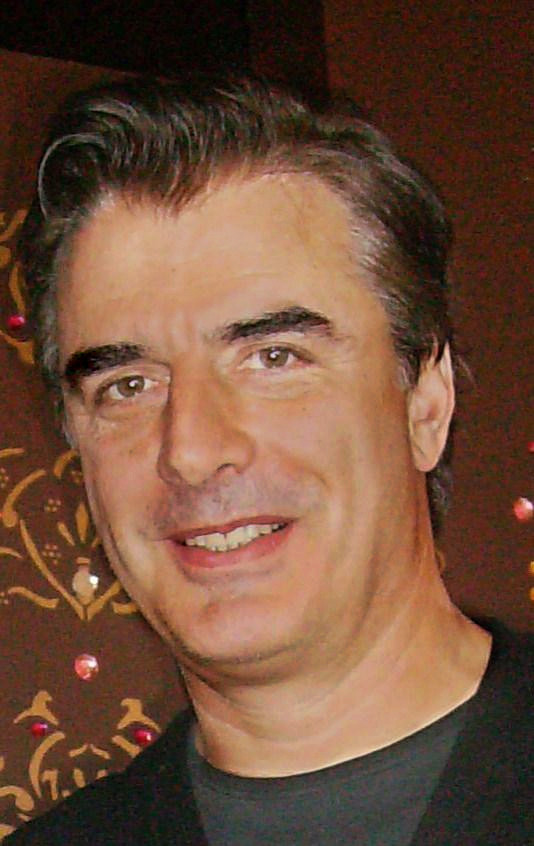
Chris Noth, who played Detective Mike Logan, left Law & Order: Criminal Intent at the end of season seven.

Law & Order: Criminal Intent does not have an ensemble cast, and therefore differs from Law & Order and Law & Order: Special Victims Unit, which feature six and eight actors, respectively, receiving star billing in their seasons which are aired during the same 2008–2009 television season. The eighth season of Law & Order: Criminal Intent has five actors in starring roles, but only three appear on screen during an episode: two lead detectives and the Captain.

Four of the lead actors from the seventh season returned for season eight. Vincent D'Onofrio plays Detective Robert Goren, a hyper-intuitive contemporary Sherlock Holmes-type investigator who used to work for the US Military Police. Goren's partner, former vice squad detective, Alexandra Eames, is played by Kathryn Erbe. Eric Bogosian appears as Captain Danny Ross, and Julianne Nicholson continues to appear as Detective Megan Wheeler. Jeff Goldblum joins the cast as Detective Zack Nichols, replacing Detective Mike Logan (Chris Noth) as Wheeler's partner. Each episode features an alternate investigating team of detectives. D'Onofrio and Erbe appear together in one episode, and Goldblum and Nicholson appear together in the following episode. D'Onofrio and Erbe are in the third episode, and the fourth features Goldblum and Nicholson. Bogosian appears in every episode of the season. This format will continue until episode twelve, when Nicholson will leave the series temporarily on maternity leave. Erbe's character will then partner with both Goren and Nichols for the final four episodes of the season.

In a recurring role, Leslie Hendrix continues to appear as Assistant Chief Medical Examiner Elizabeth Rodgers, the same character she has also played in Law & Order and the first season of Law & Order: Special Victims Unit. She has appeared in all episodes of seasons 7 and 8. Steve Zirnkilton provides a voice-over at the beginning of each episode's opening credits, saying "In New York City's war on crime, the worst criminal offenders are pursued by the detectives of the Major Case Squad. These are their stories."

=== Main cast ===
Actor/Actress	Character	Role	Episodes
Vincent D'Onofrio	Detective Robert Goren	Junior Detective	1, 3, 5, 7, 9, 11, 13, 15
Kathryn Erbe	Detective Alexandra Eames	Senior Detective	Main 1, 3, 5, 7, 9, 11, 13, 15–16, recurring 14
Eric Bogosian	Captain Danny Ross	Police Commanding Officer	All
Jeff Goldblum	Detective Zack Nichols	Senior Detective	2, 4, 6, 8, 10, 12, 14, 16
Julianne Nicholson	Detective Megan Wheeler	Junior Detective	2, 4, 6, 8, 10, 12, 14

== Distribution ==
Season eight of Law & Order: Criminal Intent first aired during the 2008–2009 television season on USA Network, an American cable channel. The season premiere episode's air date changed twice before it was eventually broadcast on April 19, 2009, at 9:00 p.m. EST. It was originally scheduled to air in November 2008, just three months after season seven's final episode, but was then pushed back to January 2009. It was rescheduled a second time in January. It was reported that the episodes were held back because the two starring Goldblum and Nicholson, and produced by Nathan were "terrible" and had to be scrapped. Episodes aired weekly – except May 24 – for 16 weeks until August 9, 2009.

When Law & Order: Criminal Intent first premiered in 2001, it aired on NBC, the same broadcast network that the rest of the Law & Order franchise airs on. Under a $100,000-per-episode shared or second window syndication agreement made between NBC and USA Network, USA Network was allowed to broadcast episodes out of primetime a week after their premiere on NBC. In 2007, following a ratings decline, first-run episodes moved from NBC to USA Network, and NBC reaired the episodes beginning January 2008. The same deal continues to run for season eight; NBC began airing episodes from June 3, 2009.

The day following its broadcast on US television, each episode was available to purchase and download at the iTunes Store and Amazon Video on Demand; however, unlike most other NBC and USA Network series, they were not streamed on USA Network's website or Hulu, which was co-owned by NBC Universal, USA Network's parent company.

== Reception ==
Critical interest in season eight focused on the arrival of Jeff Goldblum as Detective Zack Nichols. Ginia Bellafante of The New York Times wrote, "[Nichols] is better suited to Mr. Goldblum's sensibility than the hallucinating detective he played on the short-lived series Raines, on which he was required to do too much feeling". She continued, "Goldblum's initial scene has the effect of a star's first walk-on in a stage play: you feel moved to applause... you trust him to break through the show's melodramatic solemnity; he signals a kind of first-aid relief". She went on to say that Nicholson, as Detective Wheeler, Nichols' partner, "is destined to fade even further into the background than she did with her previous partner, Mike Logan", and that D'Onofrio's Detective Goren will now seem even more annoying when compared to Nichols. Brian Lowry, reviewing for Variety, echoed Bellafonte, commenting that "Goldblum's deft touch with rapid-fire delivery makes him a particularly good choice for the show's cerebral brand of crime drama, although as a consequence, that approach tends to leave the secondary detective with even less to occupy her in most episodes than the flagship [Law & Order]'s assistant district attorneys". He added that the addition of Goldblum to the cast "should breathe a bit of life into Law & Order: Criminal Intent's familiar cat-and-mouse format", noting that it is the least consistently interesting series of the franchise. He noted, though, that due to the nature of the series, attention to the main characters' lives takes a back seat to the perpetrators, victims, and their investigations, saying it is a shame for Goldblum's admirers, as he is limited by the series' "fairly rigid parameters" and cannot fully showcase his acting talents. Lowry did, however, warn Goldblum's fans to "be content. Be very content". In Entertainment Weekly, Mandi Bierly said of Nichols, "he's so laidback that he often does not even appear to be moving when he's walking... He's exactly what you thought you were getting from the casting of Jeff Goldblum." Of Wheeler, she said she hoped that in the forthcoming episodes, Nicholson would get to do more with the character than she did in Goldblum's premiere episode. "I'm assuming she's not always that irrelevant?" she questioned. "She was just feeling her new partner out, which is why she did nothing?"

"Playing Dead", the season's first episode featuring Detectives Goren and Eames, had 4.578 million viewers, over 400,000 more viewers than the following episode, which was Goldblum's premiere. For the remainder of the season, however, episodes featuring Goldblum and Nicholson were watched by more viewers than the episodes featuring D'Onofrio and Erbe, although the viewing figures for all episodes continued to drop over the following weeks. The May 10 episode was watched by 3.14 million viewers and placed outside the top twenty cable network television shows for the week, although eight programs that did place inside the top twenty were NBA Playoff matches. Subsequent episodes were watched by 3.709 million viewers and 4.012 million viewers, but the June 7 episode saw the figures begin to climb. "The Glory That Was...", which aired on June 14, was the second-highest-rated cable television program for that night. It was watched by 4.14 million people from a total of 3.19 million households, and was watched by 1.87 million people within the 25- to 54-year-old demographics. Its viewing figures were beaten only by an episode of In Plain Sight, which was broadcast immediately after Law & Order: Criminal Intent on the USA Network. It was also the most-watched episode of the season that features Goldblum and Nicholson. The following week's episode, "Family Values," also received high viewing figures. Beaten out by In Plain Sight again, it was that night's second-highest-rated cable program among 25- to 54-year-olds, 1.625 million of whom viewed it. It was also the second-highest-rated program for total viewing figures, being watched by 3.44 million people.

== Episodes ==
No. overall	No. in season	Title	Directed by	Written by	USA air date	NBC air date	Prod. code	U.S. viewers (millions)
156	1	"Playing Dead"	Michael Smith	Antoinette Stella	April 19, 2009	May 6, 2009	08009	4.57
Detectives Goren and Eames investigate a case involving the shooting death of drug addict Richard "Rick" Siebert (Elan Moss-Bachrach) and the wounding of Stacy Hayes-Fitzgerald (Betty Gilpin), the step-daughter of Councilman Neil Hayes-Fitzgerald (Scott Cohen) a powerful local politician, who "played dead" after the shooting. Eventually it is discovered that Siebert had been blackmailing the Councilman who had been molesting Stacy for years. Stacy speaks up when she realizes that her step-father is grooming the family babysitter Jessica (Jessica Coles) as a potential next victim and is also eyeing Stacy's young "sister" Sophie who is actually her own daughter by him. When Goren and Eames confront the Councilman, it is revealed that although he has been guilty of incest, it was his ambitious and wealthy mother Camille (Kathy Baker) who orchestrated the murder in a effort to cover up her son's continuing misdeeds.
157	2	"Rock Star"	Bill D'Elia	Ed Zuckerman	April 26, 2009	May 13, 2009	08008	4.10
Detective Megan Wheeler and her new partner, Detective Zack Nichols, are sent to investigate the stabbing of a young hipster, Theodore "Teeter" Kenright (Brian Fenkart) in an ethnically-charged neighborhood. They enter his world of aspiring artists with big dreams living in a converted warehouse run by a former rock musician Phillip (Daniel Gerroll). The detectives uncover a web of petty jealousies and competitive culture, especially after Rafe Shaver (Josiah Early), a promising guitar player is found pushed to his death in an open industrial elevator shaft. They become suspicious of ambitious musician Hank (Ashton Holmes) who not only acquires Rafe's quarters and band membership but also his girlfriend, Sue Smith (Gillian Jacobs), who is also sleeping with Phillip to pay her rent. The detectives focus on this pair of opportunists and eventually connect them to the murders. Guest actors also include Will Swenson as Joe Lazar and Brandon Victor Dixon as Dix.
158	3	"Identity Crisis"	Michael Smith	Pamela Wechsler	May 3, 2009	May 20, 2009	08005	3.14
A flashback shows two young brothers, Tommy Burris (Sam Trammell) and his younger brother Anthony (Patrick Arnheim) living with their physically and emotionally abusive schizophrenic mother (Breeda Wool), who dies in the bathtub by electrocution. Tommy is charged with her murder and the boys are subsequently separated and put into foster care. Twenty years later, when Anthony reappears, Tommy feels his successful life as Gray Vanderhoven, the latest of several false identities and pretending to be a graduate of Princeton University, is threatened by Anthony's appearance and shoots him. Goren and Eames are brought in to investigate, meanwhile Tommy abandons his wife, Lucretia (Jenny Powers), and rents a house in Nantucket under the name Tyler Chisholm and charms the owner's daughter (Mireille Enos). Goren and Eames track him down and during questioning, Goren shocks Tommy with the information that Anthony was dying from lymphoma and he was probably trying to make amends with his brother because of his imminent death.
159	4	"In Treatment"	Jean de Segonzac	Timothy J. Lea	May 10, 2009	May 27, 2009	08010	3.14
Frank Hatcher (Benjamin John Parrillo) a Wall Street executive is brutally stabbed during a gala honoring his boss, financial manager Archie Beuliss (Norbert Leo Butz), just as news of a fraud investigation by the SEC causes a halt to trading in the company. Detectives Nichols and Wheeler investigate his murder and uncover that Hatcher was most likely the whistleblower who caused the investigation. Beuliss admits himself to a rehab clinic under the management of controlling psychiatrist Dr. Walter Ernst (Dennis Boutsikaris) in an apparent effort to avoid questioning. When an investor/patient, Ron Hemmings (Wass Stevens) apparently commits suicide after a conjugal visit from Beuliss' wife, Elaine (Alexa Havins), Earnst becomes the prime suspect. Especially so after the detectives discover that he had been convincing his wealthy patients to invest in Beuliss's company and he feared that Hatcher's divulgence could have destroyed the company.
160	5	"Faithfully"	Jean de Segonzac	Antoinette Stella	May 17, 2009	June 29, 2009	08001	3.70
Devout celebrity doctor, Dr. Ryan Conlon (Robert Farrior) is murdered in his home in an apparent robbery, but at the funeral Goren and Eames observe that a young acolyte Kevin Paxton (Will Rogers) fits a witness description. Following an interview with Paxton, the young man commits suicide and the detectives suspect that Conlon's wife, Carrie (Katheryn Winnick) may have been having an affair with the acolyte. However it was in fact Reverend Dan Wyler (Leland Orser) who was seeing Carrie, and the detectives turn their attention to Wyler's controlling wife Alison (Janel Moloney) who knew of her husband's affair. They realize that she manipulated Paxton into killing the doctor, but with little evidence to go on, Goren and Eames must pressure Alison into revealing her guilt.
161	6	"Astoria Helen"	Norberto Barba	Timothy J. Lea	May 31, 2009	July 6, 2009	08004	3.97
A charming con man named Joe Gallagher (Creighton James) targets a lonely, single mother, Helen Bramer (Arija Bareikis) who works for an armored truck company to obtain routing information. He and his two associates then rob an armored truck carrying millions of new dollars, but six months later one of trio dies in a bomb blast when he attempts to retrieve money from their stolen van. Detectives Nichols and Wheeler investigate, and following a series of leads, consider Bramer and Gallagher to be the prime suspects although Gallagher is supposedly dead. They track down Gallagher, but when the stolen van owner, Frank Stroup (Domenick Lombardozzi) abducts Bramer's son Kevin, the detectives realize that Stroup is the third man. They convince Bramer and Gallagher to reveal Stroup's location and Detective Nichols negotiates the boy's release and Stroup's surrender by blaming everything on Gallagher.
162	7	"Folie à Deux"	David Manson	Michael S. Chernuchin	June 7, 2009	July 13, 2009	08003	4.01
After dining in a hotel restaurant the couple, Andre (Luke Kirby) and Calista Haslum (Piper Perabo) announce that their 18 month old daughter Emma has mysteriously disappeared from their rooms during a robbery. Detectives Goren and Eames investigate, and although glass fragments and a stolen key-card lead them to the robber, Mark Carston (Eric Anderson), he does not have the child. They learn that Andre, a philandering English teacher and plagiarist poet, is being financially supported by his rich but childless aunt Emily Huntford (Lynn Redgrave) who is dying of a heart condition. The aunt receives a ransom call, however the detectives discover that the perpetrators are her secretary George Buckley (Steve Witting) and his boyfriend, but they do not have the child. Eventually, the detectives uncover that there never was a child at the hotel and Goren suspects a Folie à Deux where the parents are maintaining the illusion that their dead child is still alive. Calista admits that Emily died when she left her in the car on a hot day while she searched hotels for her cheating husband. Andre then exploited Calista's distraught condition to continue receiving financial support for the child from his unsuspecting aunt.
163	8	"The Glory That Was..."	Norberto Barba	Robert Nathan	June 14, 2009	July 20, 2009	08002	4.14
Wheeler and Nichols investigate the murder of two people including an Olympic Gold Medal winner from Belgium. The two detectives are working much better together and the investigation takes them to signs of bribery, collusion, and betrayal. Guest stars include Pedro Pascal, Stephanie Szostak and Jess Weixler.: This episode is excluded in the DVD release of season 8 for "content reasons".
164	9	"Family Values"	Jean de Segonzac	S : Antoinette Stella; S/T : Walon Green	June 21, 2009	August 3, 2009	08015	3.44
Devout Christian father, Paul Devildis (David Harbour), is aroused by his daughter Katherine's (Britt Robertson) performance in a low-cut period costume during a school production of "Cyrano de Bergerac". Later that night, he murders his liberal sister-in-law and her husband with a hammer at their home. Eames and Goren are called to investigate the apparently random murders, but when the school drama teacher Vilma (Karen Ziemba) is also found killed with a hammer, they look for a connection through the school. They focus on Paul Devildis, and when his wife Mary (Susan Misner) is found shot dead in their home and he goes missing, they fear for the life of his daughter. The police track him down to a remote cabin and arrest him for the murders, then Goren engages him in a religious debate and convinces him to revealing the location of his daughter before she dies of exposure.: The case is based loosely on the case of John List.
165	10	"Salome in Manhattan" "Salome"	Steve Shill	Andrew Lipsitz	June 28, 2009	August 10, 2009	08006	4.70
Celebrity heiress Lisa Wellesley (Alexandra Daddario) is murdered in her upscale apartment and Nichols and Wheeler are called in to investigate. Her father (Tyrone Mitchell Henderson) and mother (Haviland Morris) seem to know little about her life. Meanwhile, her celebrity chef fiancé, Max Goodwin (Eric Balfour), his business partner, Larry Clay (Shawn Hatosy), former rapper and clothes designer partner, Reginald X. Oldman (RXO) (Anthony 'Treach' Criss), and troublesome young man, Jason (Liam Aiken), all become potential suspects. With information from barmaid Jackie (Nikki M. James) and further investigation, the detectives realize Max's partner and college buddy, Larry, saw Lisa as an impediment to his friendship with Max and murdered her in a fit of rage.
166	11	"Lady's Man"	Ken Girotti	Michael S. Chernuchin	June 28, 2009	August 17, 2009	08011	4.60
Detectives Goren and Eames investigate the killing of Boz Burnham (Jack Gwaltney) on his birthday. He had become famous for dodging a conviction for the murder of his first wife 10 years earlier because of a mishandled trial and had used his notoriety to produce a TV show. Eames had worked the original case with Kevin Mulrooney (Raúl Esparza) who is now an ADA but Mulrooney blames Eames for the failed conviction which ruined his career. Evidence in Burnham's murderer points to a red-headed woman however Goren's research into the old murder case suggests that Mulrooney planted evidence although he blames Eames for the failure of the case. Goren eventually accuses Mulrooney of Burnham's murder and gives his handcuffs to Eames to arrest him. Also stars John Rue as Mulrooney's father Harry.
167	12	"Passion"	Jonathan Herron	Michael S. Chernuchin	July 12, 2009	August 24, 2009	08012	3.47
Egocentric poet Jacob Garrety (Will Chase) is embittered when foundation president Don McCallum (Stephen Kunken) announces he is cutting funding to the poetry journal "The Village Quarterly". Garrety appeals to his assistant and lover Lauren Collins (Christina Brucato) to use her feminine charm to change McCallum's mind. At a poetry reading, Jacob enjoys the attention of arts patron Sandra Dunbar (Sarah Rafferty), wife of wealthy John Dunbar (Rufus Collins). Meanwhile, Collins visits McCallum, but she is later found dead on the street, murdered with a brick. Days later, Garrety is violently murdered with a pair of scissors in his office. Detectives Nichols and Wheeler discover that Sandra Dunbar (née O'Bannon) was the former girlfriend of Garrety in college and still is infatuated with him. To entice Dunbar into confessing to the two murders, Nichols produces an unfinished poem penned by himself but which he attributes to Garrety. Also stars Damian Young and Yvonne Perry.
168	13	"All In"	David Manson	T : Antoinette Stella & Walon Green; S/T : Pamela Wechsler	July 19, 2009	August 31, 2009	08013	4.14
When young poker hotshot Josh Snow (Aaron Stanford) loses $80,000 in a card game, his backer and bookie Lou Cardinale (Boris McGiver) forces him into making collections to pay off his losses. Lou gives him a .38 revolver and a box of blanks to extract gambling debts and sends his mistress, Angela (Aleksa Palladino), with him to keep an eye on the money. At his first collection of $20,000 from Frankie Martin (Harry O'Reilly), Snow shoots a blank at the gambler and he pays up. However, when Snow confronts the next victim, Kip McGonagle (Robert Leeshock), he fires the gun again but a real bullet fatally wounds McGonagle. Investigating detectives Goren and Eames know Snow from a former case (Note: Similar plot elements to season five's Cruise to Nowhere but with a different actor and character name) and Goren pays an elaborate game to get Snow to confess to intentionally shooting McGonagle in an effort to frame Cardinale for the murder. Also stars Tobias Truvillion and Brenda Withers.
169	14	"Major Case"	Chris Zalla	Andrew Lipsitz	July 26, 2009	August 31, 2009	08014	4.63
Low level drug dealer Grace Purefoy (Lauren Campbell) is helped to escape her violent supplier, Justin Lennox (Stivi Paskoski), by a neighbor who then kills her after she rejects his advances. When her body is found in a dumpster the next morning with the wallet of the daughter of a wealthy family Major Case is called in. Nichols and the heavily pregnant Wheeler arrive to investigate but when Wheeler goes into labor, Eames joins Nichols. They visit an old friend of Nichols, the highly respected forensic scientist Dr. Henry Muller (Dylan Baker) for assistance who happens to be Purefoy's neighbor and murderer. Muller plants DNA evidence to link Lennox to Purefoy, even though M.E. Elizabeth Rodgers found nothing in her thorough examination of the body which had been washed down with bleach. When Nichols finds that Muller's mother lived across the street from Purefoy, he suspects Muller is involved but he is then taken off the case by Captain Danny Ross under pressure from Muller. However as more evidence points to Muller, Ross assists Nichols in setting a trap to expose Muller's guilt. Also stars Allison Daugherty as Grace's alcoholic mother Karen Purefoy and John Wojda as her mother's boyfriend Nate Henrick.: Last episode to feature Julianne Nicholson (Detective Megan Wheeler).
170	15	"Alpha Dog"	Norberto Barba	Walon Green	August 2, 2009	September 7, 2009	08007	4.23
Hunky posterboy with a million-dollar torso, Hamp Trotter (Ryan Locke), spends a night with an unknown woman and is found dead the next morning after being heavily drugged and then suffocated to death. Suspects include his jealous ex-wife, Amy Townsend (Sabine Singh) but at a memorial for Hamp and demonstration against a proposed redevelopment by wealthy property developer, Duke DeGuerin (Roger Rees), the mystery woman is identified as Gallina "Galla" Ilyanova Ritcher (Jennifer Missoni). Goren and Eames interview Galla's former pimp Jamie Witzger (James Joseph O'Neil) in prison who reveals that she was paid to seduce and drug Hamp to discredit him. Eames interviews DeGuerin's much younger and beautiful wife Avia DeGuerin (Sarah Desage) in a sauna about her affair with Hamp but she refused to talk out of fear of her husband. Later, Galla is found strangled to death in Hamp's sealed apartment. When the detectives question Stanislav Bardem (Nestor Serrano), DeGuerin' head of security, he names his boss as the likely culprit because of his jealous and violent nature. The detectives bring DeGuerin in for questioning and he almost admits his guilt in both murders, however then his wife Avia then offers to give evidence against him.
171	16	"Revolution"	John David Coles	Michael S. Chernuchin	August 9, 2009	September 7, 2009	08016	4.83
With banks failing and public discontent high, aging revolutionary Axel Kaspers (Stephen Lang) believes the time is ripe to galvanize public reaction and spark a populist uprising. With his daughter Birgit (Tania Raymonde) and low level drug dealer disciple Mel (Jas Anderson), Kaspers orchestrates the kidnapping of Continental Bankcorp president, Peter Evans (John Rothman). However, the carefully planned carjacking goes wrong when Evans resists and Kaspers shoots and kills Evans and his driver Jerry Delarossa (Ezra Knight). Kaspers later kills Mel and together with Birgit sets off a urea-based car bomb on Wall Street as a diversion. Detectives Nichols and Eames are joined by FBI Agent Carmen Martino (Deirdre Lovejoy) to investigate the murders and suspect a surviving member of the radical Baader-Meinhof gang is involved. After Kaspers has a one night stand with Rosalyn "Rosie" Griggs (Kathleen McElfresh), Birgit kills her and then uses her credit cards to buy bomb-making materials. The detectives track down Kaspers and arrest him, but his more radical daughter Birgit takes hostages in the Continental Bankcorp building and threatens to blow it up unless Kaspers is put on a plane to Cuba. Nichols takes Kaspers into the bank lobby and convinces him to admit to Birgit that she is more important to him than radical ideology. However as Nichols defuses the situation, an FBI sniper kills Birgit, knocking her backwards into Nichols' arms to prevent the tilt switch around her neck from detonating the bomb. Also stars Deirdre Lovejoy.

Preceded by Season Seven	List of Law & Order: Criminal Intent episodes	Succeeded by Season Nine
