= The Glory That Was... (Law & Order: Criminal Intent) =

- Law & Order: Criminal Intent episode
- Episode no.: Season 8 Episode 8
- Directed by: Norberto Barba
- Written by: Dick Wolf (creator); René Balcer (developer); Robert Nathan (teleplay)
- Production code: 1. CI8016
- Original air date: June 14, 2009

Guest appearances
- Ritchie Coster as Jack Taylor; Jess Weixler as Laura Green; Pedro Pascal as Kevin Green; Stéphanie Szostak as Caroline Walters; Helen Greenberg as Caroline´s Assistant; Robert LuPone as Paul´s Lawyer; Bryan Scott Johnson as A.D.A Lucas; Gerrit Vandermeer as Attorney Morrison; Kevin Cutts as Gerrigan; Amanda Warren as Haydon

Episode chronology
← Previous "Folie a Deux"	Next → "Family Values"

"The Glory That Was..." is the eighth episode of the eighth season of Law & Order: Criminal Intent and the 163rd episode overall. The episode was written by Robert Nathan, and was directed by Norberto Barba. This episode was originally set to air after "Faithfully", which was set to be the season premiere episode; the episode, instead, aired on USA Network on June 14, 2009.

== Plot ==
Detectives Nichols and Wheeler, together with Captain Ross, find themselves on the world stage, untangling the politics behind the Olympic Site Selection Committee.

At the top of the show, a wealthy Belgian diplomat, Caroline Walters, is found murdered in Central Park. Nearby, a second body is discovered: a former Secret Service agent hired to protect her. Nichols and Wheeler begin their investigation at the Belgian Consulate, where they meet high-profile security consultant Jack Taylor — who, it turns out, hired the now-dead agent meant to protect Walters.

The detectives turn their attention to threats made against Walters, and soon a DVD surfaces that suggests she was being blackmailed: the DVD contains images of her making love with another woman, Laura Green.

When interrogated, Green claims that she, too, was being blackmailed. But soon, when her story fails to hold up, and after an attempt on her life, Nichols and Wheeler know they have their killer: Green was the blackmailer and someone now wants her dead. The detectives know that someone else is involved.

Nichols, in what will be a signature element of the show, retreats from the case, in order to garner perspective. In this episode, he goes to the Film Forum, in Greenwich Village, to watch Breakfast at Tiffany's. It is while watching the film that he finally puts the pieces together.

In the aria of the show, Nichols interrogates Taylor, who has branch offices throughout the world. Pulling on the strings that hold the tightly wound Taylor together, Nichols leads Taylor directly into a noose of self-incrimination. Taylor expected to win a security contract in Rio de Janeiro. Walters, it turns out, was the vote he needed on the Olympic Site Selection Committee that would throw the Olympics to Rio. However, she refused and instead was set to vote for Tokyo. As a result, Taylor hired Laura to seduce and blackmail Walters to sway her vote, but it went sideways when her husband killed Walters and the bodyguard, so Taylor in turn hired a hit man to kill them instead. Laura makes a deal, confirming that Taylor set the entire blackmail scheme into motion.

== Cast ==
Jeff Goldblum as Det. Zachary Nichols
Julianne Nicholson as Det. Megan Wheeler
Eric Bogosian as Capt. Daniel Ross

== Reaction ==
Aired in Brazil on September 3, 2009 by AXN, this episode caused uproar at the headquarters of Rio de Janeiro bid for the 2016 Summer Olympics. Mayor Eduardo Paes expressed disgust for the show, claiming it was "ridiculous and pathetic". State governor Sérgio Cabral Filho said jokingly that "now even [Law & Order's] screenwriters are desperate." The uproar was significant enough that the episode was not included in the official DVD release for the season. It is also not included in Peacock’s streaming of the series.
