= Law & Order: Criminal Intent season 7 =

Season of American television series

Law & Order: Criminal Intent
- Season 7
- Season 7 U.S. DVD cover
- No. of episodes: 22

Release
- Original network: USA Network
- Original release: October 4, 2007 – August 24, 2008

Season chronology
- ← Previous; Season 6 Next → Season 8

The seventh season of Law & Order: Criminal Intent premiered on USA Network on October 4, 2007, and ended on August 24, 2008.

The first ten episodes of the seventh season aired on Thursday nights at 10:00PM/9:00PM (Central), filling a slot previously occupied by the first season of Burn Notice. The season then took a "fall finale" with the episode "Senseless," coinciding with the 2007 Writers Guild of America strike where show runner/executive producer Warren Leight and the rest of the writing staff participated in the work stoppage; the first ten episodes of the season being the only ones produced. The remaining twelve episodes resumed airing Sunday nights at 9:00PM/8:00PM (Central) – leading in new series In Plain Sight – starting June 8, 2008.

== Network change and production ==
During the 2006-2007 network TV season, both Law & Order: Criminal Intent and the original Law & Order series began to falter in the ratings on NBC; president at the time Jeff Zucker was in a telephone interview with creator Dick Wolf when he renewed both series, Mr. Zucker said the plan to move original episodes of Criminal Intent to USA Network, with the repeats then set to play "shortly thereafter" on NBC, represented "a new paradigm for network TV." Wolf said he was thrilled with the deal because "my stated goal has been to keep all three shows (L&O, CI, & SVU) up and running." Both the original series and Criminal Intent won full 22-episode orders, although most series for cable channels do not produce more than 13. Mr. Wolf said that he had found some budgetary savings to make the deal more viable, but that "none of them are going to be apparent to viewers."

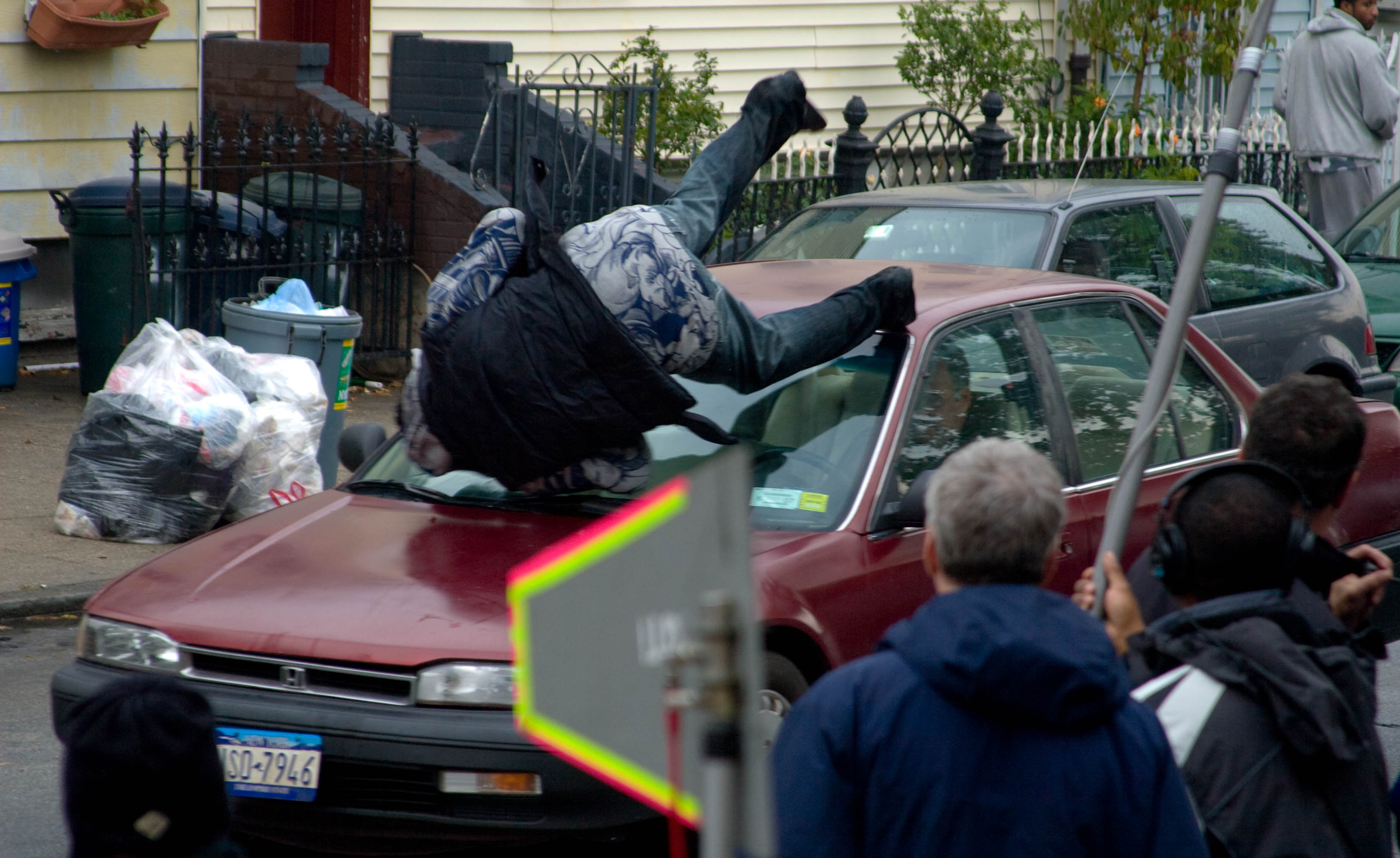
A scene from the episode, "Senseless" being filmed in November 2007.

Chris Noth who portrayed Detective Mike Logan said on the move from network to cable; "Cable is probably the future. They're paying a lot more attention to [the show] than NBC did, frankly." Noth also believed the change would help the series differentiate itself from the rest of the franchise, saying, "We're happy to set ourselves apart." Vincent D'Onofrio who portrayed Detective Robert Goren said about the switch, "I feel like it saved the show." In an interview about his character, Eric Bogosian (who portrayed Captain Daniel Ross) thought about the move to USA, "We were one of whatever number of shows on NBC, we're getting numbers every week, we're knocking ourselves out to do the best we can, and I don't think we had one ad all season. To be on USA and have them embrace us and cheerlead us, we feel we deserve it. USA wants us to succeed. I just hope more people watch it and dig it."

The theme music changed to that of the then-defunct Law & Order: Trial by Jury. Original episodes of season seven aired on USA Network until August 2008, with reruns on NBC beginning in January 2008. Production of the seventh season was interrupted by the 2007 Writers Guild of America strike when Executive Producer Warren Leight and the rest of the writing staff participated in the work stoppage. Only 10 of the 22 episodes ordered were produced pre-strike, while the remaining 12 episodes began airing June 8, 2008.

In May 2008, before the remaining episodes returned, USA Network decided to renew Criminal Intent for a sixteen-episode eighth season. Days after USA Network renewed the series, executive producer Warren Leight announced that he was departing the series, after having taken CI to the top drama series in basic cable primetime for the fourth quarter, more than doubling USA’s audience in the 10 p.m. Thursday slot from the same period the previous year. Leight departed at the end of the season to work on HBO's therapy drama In Treatment.

== Cast changes ==
While Criminal Intent was in transition from NBC to USA Network, the salaries of cast members Vincent D'Onofrio, Kathryn Erbe, and Chris Noth were frozen. The prospect of the salary freeze wasn't sitting well with them, as they typically enjoyed at least a five percent year-to-year bump. In the end they accepted a non-pay raise for the new season and they returned, static at $350K for each of the 11 episodes produced.

Julianne Nicholson was temporarily replaced by Alicia Witt who played Detective Nola Falacci, a new partner to Detective Logan, while Nicholson was on maternity leave. Nicholson returned in the episode "Contract," which aired on June 15, 2008 (with In Plain Sight's Mary McCormack making a cameo as her character Mary Shannon).

Chris Noth decided to leave the series at the end of the season; Noth told TV Guide, "When others couldn't get television shows produced in New York, Dick Wolf found a way to do it, and as a New Yorker I truly appreciate all that he has done for the city. The last few years have been fantastic, and both sides are happy with the result. 'All's well that ends well.'" Noth said the split was "totally mutual." He added, "The show keeps morphing and always finds new people. I'm gonna miss everyone I work with every day." Creator Dick Wolf said about Noth's departure "Chris has been a member of the "Law & Order" family since the beginning, and Mike Logan is one of the most popular detectives in the history of television," Wolf says. "We all wish him the best."

Jeff Goldblum was set to replace Noth. "Jeff's presence will add a new dimension to an already successful show," Dick Wolf said in a statement.

== Cast ==
=== Main cast ===
Actor/Actress	Character	Episodes
Team A
Vincent D'Onofrio	Detective Robert Goren	1, 3, 5, 7, 9, 11, 13, 15, 17, 19, 22
Kathryn Erbe	Detective Alexandra Eames	1, 3, 5, 7, 9, 11, 13, 15, 17, 19, 22
Team B
Chris Noth	Detective Mike Logan	2, 4, 6, 8, 10, 12, 14, 16, 18, 20–21
Alicia Witt	Detective Nola Falacci	2, 4, 6, 8, 10
Julianne Nicholson	Detective Megan Wheeler	12, 14, 16, 18, 20–21
Both
Eric Bogosian	Captain Danny Ross	All

=== Recurring cast ===
- Geneva Carr as News Reporter Faith Yancy
- Hudson Cooper as Detective Jefferies
- Seth Gilliam as Detective Daniels
- Traci Godfrey as Detective Agnes Farley
- Tony Goldwyn as Frank Goren
- Leslie Hendrix as Chief Medical Examiner Elizabeth Rodgers
- Leslie Hope as Assistant District Attorney Terri Driver
- Holt McCallany as Detective Patrick Copa
- Gary Patent as NYPD Computer Expert Ira Whipple
- Mike Pniewski as Chief of Detectives Kenneth Moran
- Caris Vujcec as Detective Louise Campesi
- Amanda Warren as CSU Tech

=== Guest stars ===
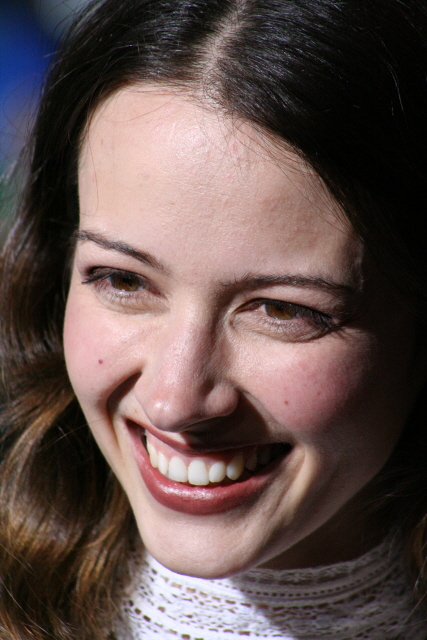
Amy Acker played Leslie LeZard in "Smile"

Holt McCallany guest starred in the season premiere episode "Amends," as Det. Patrick Copa who witnesses the murder of his partner Kevin Quinn (Gerald McCullouch), but has degenerative vision impairment. Florencia Lozano portrays Quinn's widow Theresa, with whom Eames shares a special connection since Kevin was previously partnered with Eames' husband. Goren and Eames question Ray and Rodolfo Delgado (Felix Solis and Emilio Delgado, respectively). Rafael Sardina plays Dr. Manny Beltran, who was responsible for the death of Eames' husband years ago. Seth Gilliam plays Det. Daniels from narcotics, who helps Major Case when drugs and gangs are involved.

Michael O'Keefe guest starred in "Seeds" as Doctor Eli Rush in a case where an OB-GYN is murdered and posed in a ritualistic fashion.

In "Smile," Amy Acker as Leslie LeZard, Jason Kravits as Jim Kettle, and Jim Gaffigan as Marty Palin, are FDA employees dealing with a crisis from contaminated mouthwash produced by Shorr Labs, whose CEO Bing Schorr is played by Frank John Hughes. Holley Fain also appears as Stacey, an FDA office assistant.

In "Lonelyville," Lola Glaudini portrays Leanne Baker, a dangerous defense attorney who is more than she seems. Josh Pais plays Noah Brezner, who is cheating on his wife with Tammy Mills (Amanda Detmer). At a bar, he meets Anya Pugach (Jennifer Missoni) who winds up dead in his bed.

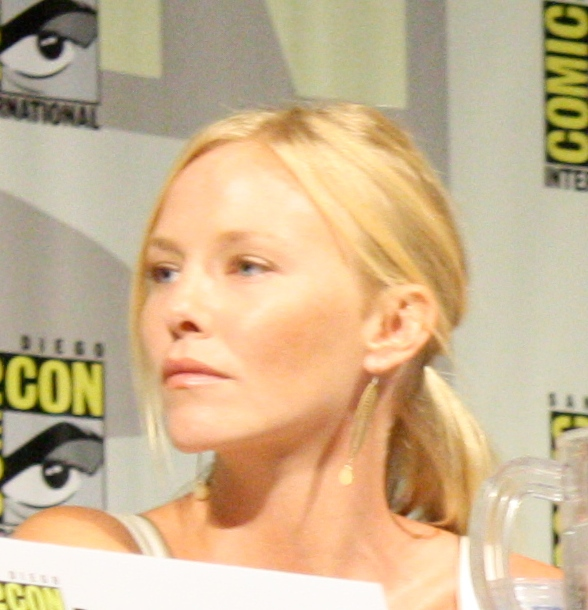
Kelli Giddish played Dana Stipe in "Depths" and Det. Amanda Rollins in Law & Order: SVU

In "Depths," Frederick Weller guest starred as Simon Harper, a wealthy man who finances the search for sunken treasure, which goes bad when one of the hunters, Tarek "Rick" Agiza (Amir Arison), turns up dead on a Coney Island beach. Det. Streetman (Alison Becker) is first on scene. To sort out who killed Rick, Goren and Eames hunt for the remaining hunters, Dana Stipe (Kelli Giddish), her husband Greg (Michael Cerveris), and Tom "Chilly" Chilton (Eric Sheffer Stevens).

Steve Guttenberg and Paula Devicq guest star in "Courtship" as a famous couple, Clay Darren and Christine Mayfield, in the middle of a divorce presided by Judge Harvey Frye (Bruce MacVittie). Frye's wife Monica is murdered "pro" style, and a tip on "Client X" from Dr. Jay Alberstein (Remy Auberjonois) leads Logan and Falacci first to FBI Agent Frank Billings (Charles Borland), then to ex-CIA PI Ronald Hawk (John Ventimiglia).

Peter Coyote guest starred in "Self-Made" as Lionel Shill, a celebrated writer whose career is on the decline, as well as his young protégé T.J. Hawkins (Pablo Schreiber). Shamika Cotton plays Kira Danforth, a brilliant up-and-coming writer, working for Ariana Cypher (Barbara Walsh). When Kira is shot dead. Her pot-dealing ex-boyfriend Dante "D Tour" Heath (Al Thompson) is the obvious first suspect, and sleazy agent Gareth Sage (Fisher Stevens) is the next. Ron Simons as Det. Willis is the first on the scene.

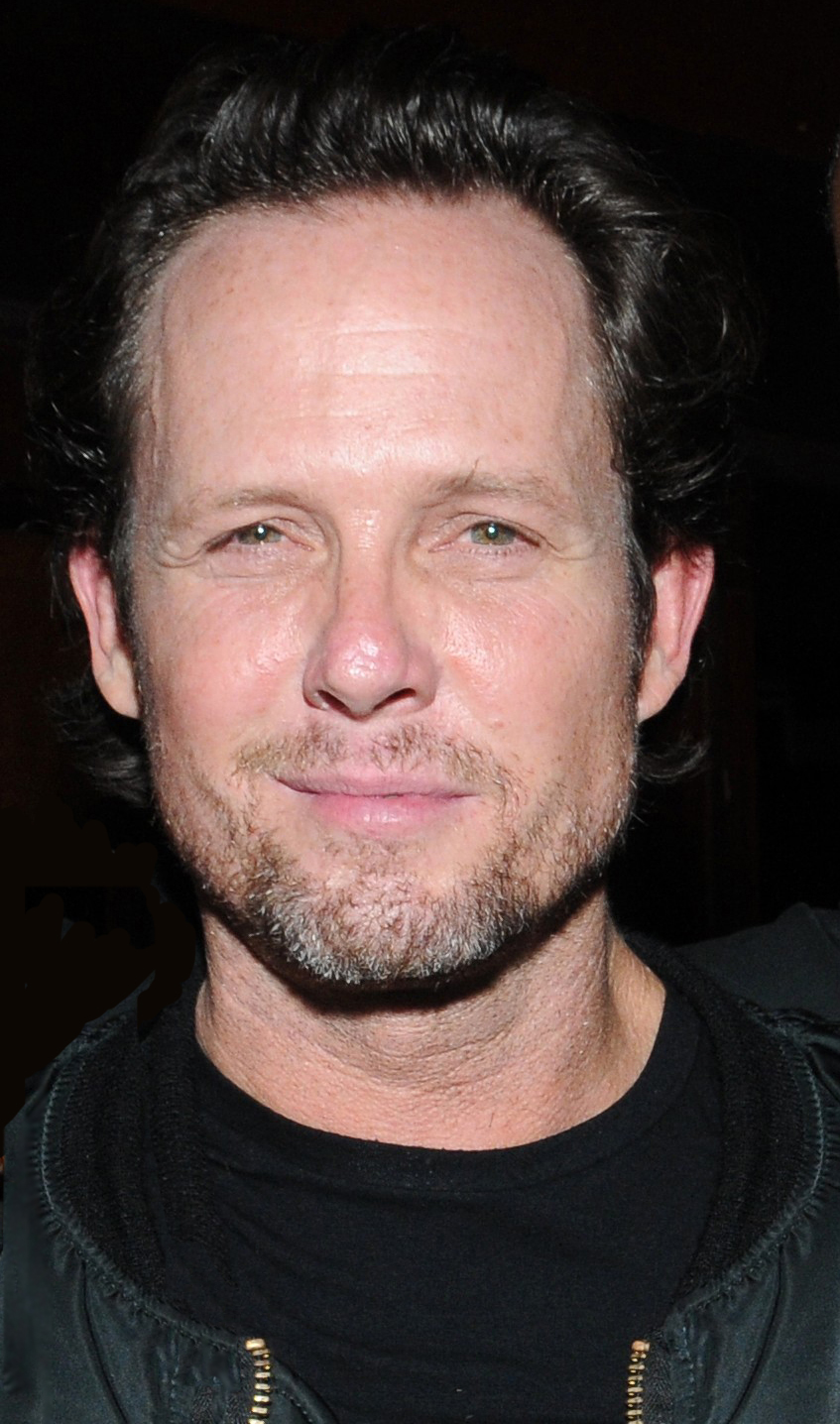
Dean Winters plays Mike Stoat in "Purgatory" and Det. Brian Cassidy in Law & Order: SVU

Cynthia Watros guest starred in "Offense" as Beth Hoyle, the wife of ambitious Bronx ADA Gene Hoyle (Andrew McCarthy), who is prosecuting a rape case against three college football players, including Tim Pardue (Kenneth Franklin). When key witness Traci Kwon (Yin Chang) dies, Logan and Falacci re-interview everyone, including Tim's mom Grace (Peri Gilpin).

In "Untethered," Tony Goldwyn returned as Frank Goren, Det. Robert Goren's brother. Frank is off the streets and clean, but his son Donny Carlson (Trevor Morgan) suspects foul play in the death of fellow inmate Jay Lowry (Kevin Townley) under the direction of Warden Pellis (Debra Monk). Robert goes undercover into the isolation ward by faking mental illness with Dr. Stern (Anne L. Nathan).

Ben Vereen as Rev. Jeremiah Morris, and Daphne Rubin-Vega as Carmen Mendoza guest star as parents of youths involved in "Senseless" violence. Morris' son Isaiah is shot along with Ty and Naomi Johnson (Monique Lea-Gall). Given Naomi's eye-witness account, Logan and Falacci track down Mendoza's two sons Hector (Reza Salazar) and Paco (Christian Navarro) to find "El Diablo" Felix Aguilar, played by Jesse Garcia.

In "Purgatory," Dean Winters and Lauren Vélez guest star as dirty cops Mike Stoat and Lois Melago. Det. Copa, forced into early retirement because of vision issues, initiates a bar altercation with Goren. Det. Daniels becomes Eames' temporary partner while Goren is suspended pending psychiatric evaluation. To get his shield back, Goren goes undercover to take down drug-dealer John Testarossa (Danny Mastrogiorgio). Louis Martinez portrays Hector Santana, who helps Eames and Copa bust Testarossa.

When Law & Order: Criminal Intent returned from the Writer's Guild strike on 8 June 2008, it was the lead-in to the premiere of new series In Plain Sight, of which the show's star, Mary McCormack, appeared briefly in her role as U.S. Marshal Mary Shannon in "Contract," on 15 June 2008. Mo Rocca plays T.K. Richmond, a New York Ledger gossip columnist and prolific blackmailer, who dies in a car bomb, just as news anchor Elliot Falls (Paul DeBoy) is trying to gather evidence for the district attorney. Logan and Wheeler track down a host of leads, including a chef (David Fumero) looking for investors, real estate developer Ted Regan (Brian Haley), TK's bookie Joey Snails (Anthony Ribustello), TKs doctor Jacoby (Tibor Feldman), and TK's sister Jeannie (Emily Kinney). The investigation leads to the making of the movie "Contract Man" produced by Beverly Tyson (Illeana Douglas) and Barry Freeburg (Jeff Garlin), in which the lead actor Spencer London (Timothy Adams) has also died mysteriously. From the current screenwriter (Maury Ginsberg), they find the original writer is Frank Chess (Federico Castelluccio), and later discover he was a former mob capo, and contract hit-man. Bomb Squad Capt. Al Petrosino (James Biberi) analyzes the car bomb and confirms Chess' signature.

Brenda Strong portrays Kathy Jarrow, who is "Betrayed" by her husband Woody Sage (Scott Evans) as he disappears with his lover Avery Hubert (Kim Allen). Goren and Eames start looking where they were last seen by questioning a bodega clerk Amado (Adrian Martinez), then Avery's husband Roy Hubert (Eric Roberts), who is also cheating with his ex-wife, Trina Melda (Kate Miller). Senator Charles E. Schumer makes a cameo appearance.

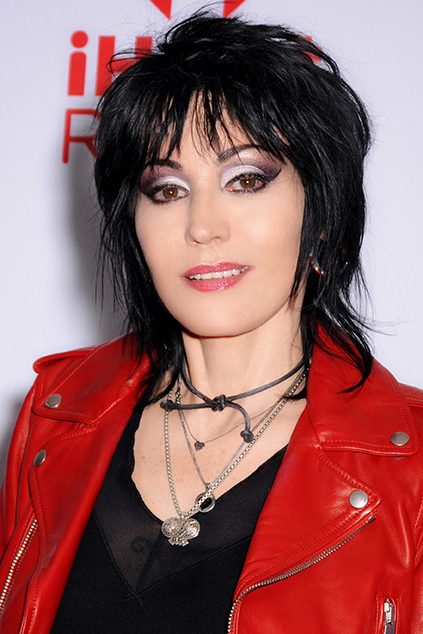
Joan Jett, 2013

In "Assassin," Indira Varma plays Bela Kahn, a Tamil freedom fighter and political activist who survives an assassination attempt at JFK when she returns from her house arrest in Sri Lanka. Madhur Jaffrey plays her mother, Stephen Schnetzer her husband Ajay, Waleed Zuaiter her brother Rani, and Aadya Bedi her niece Jasmina Khan. Olivia Birkelund plays Blair Khan, Rani's ex-wife.

Sarah Jane Morris guest starred in "Please Note We Are No Longer Accepting Letters of Recommendation from Henry Kissinger" as Marla Reynolds, a woman who murders the parents of three children who are on an exclusive and long waiting list to get into a Day Care Center. Jessica Walter portrayed her wealthy, ambitious, and vindictive mother-in-law Eleanor.

In "Reunion," Joan Jett plays Sylvia Rhodes, a public access hostess of "Rock 'n' Talk" who is murdered. Michael Massee plays Jordie Black, a rock-star accused of the murder, and Dana Wheeler-Nicholson plays Jordie's wife, Tara. Noel Fisher plays Milo Rhodes-Black, Sylvia's son. David Patrick Kelly plays Bo Levy, the family attorney.

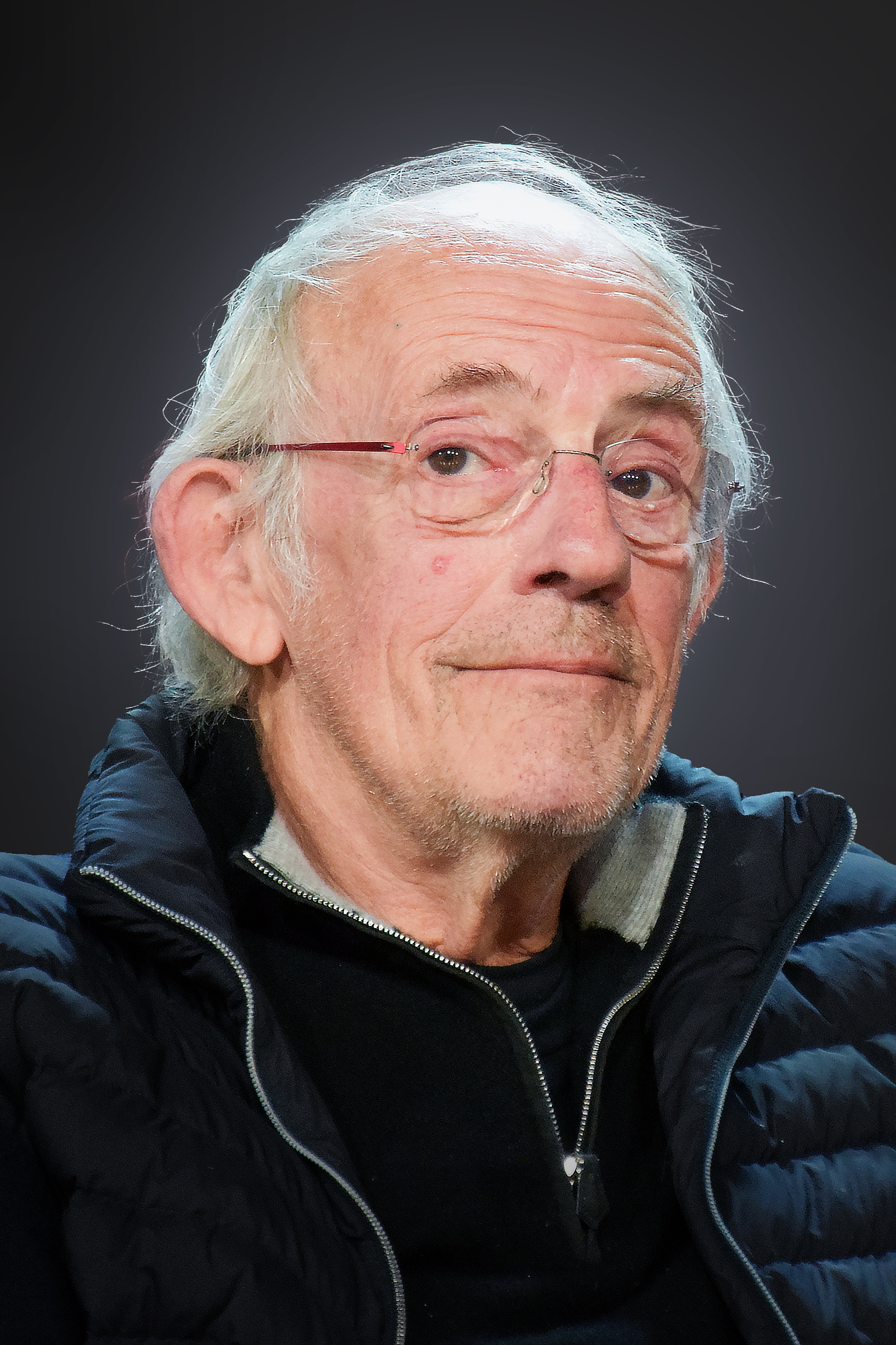
Christopher Lloyd, 2022

James Frain as Dean Holiday and Christopher Lloyd as The Great Carmine guest star in "Vanishing Act" as magicians accused of murdering another magician, Miles Stone. Will Janowitz portrays Jacob Green, Stone's technician, and Kristen Connolly plays Miranda/Teresa, initially seen as Carmine's assistant. The cold opening includes Access Hollywood cameos by Paul Shaffer, The Naked Cowboy, and Shaun Robinson.

Miguel Ferrer guest starred in "Ten Count" as boxing coach Gus Kovak, who coached Gabriel and Peter Gardela (Enver Gjokaj). Karolina Wydra plays Christina, Peter's girlfriend. When Gabriel is shot outside a bar, Logan questions the Bouncer (James Colby), then Callie's mother (Lisa Emery) to find the girl Gabriel was trying to save from her thug boyfriend (Rick Aiello). But they discover ten grand in Gabriel's room, and Wheeler thinks that "the fix was in," so she and Logan question fight promoter Ziggy Gold (Tony Roberts).

Anthony Carrigan portrays H. Jack Walker III, a privileged "Legacy" student at Manor Hill, and member of the elitist "Jack Pack" and John Shea plays his father. Sonequa Martin-Green plays Kiana Richmond, one of several lacrosse players who beat up geeky student Paul Phillips, who later turns up hanged in the tunnels beneath the school. Matt Salinger and Betsy Aidem play Paul's parents, and Kiana's lawyer-father is played by Peter Francis James. Joanna Adler plays Anna Nobile, an unpopular teacher, and Sarah Steele her daughter Tessa. Jefferson Mays as Headmaster Keifer Gates, helps detectives with a locker search.

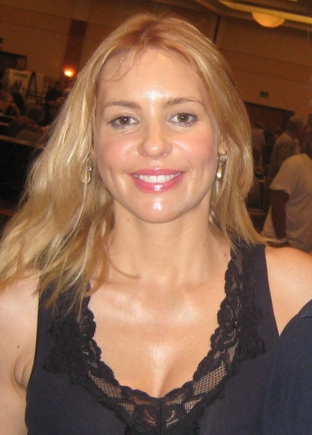
Olivia d'Abo began playing Nicole Wallace in Law & Order: CI, Season 2

In "Neighborhood Watch," Scott Sowers is Sgt. Whelan, an overly-zealous cop who floods the neighborhood with flyers calling out Kyle Jones as a sex offender. Halley Gross plays Nancy Williams, who was fifteen when she and nineteen-year-old Kyle had a consensual relationship. Leslie Hope plays as ADA Terri Driver, an ambitious prosecutor who railroaded Kyle into prison. Logan and Driver immediately begin knocking heads. Alison Becker plays Det. Streetman, who is first on-scene when Kyle's body is found. Skipp Sudduth plays Clete Dixon, a former detective who offers Capt. Ross his theory of the crime in order to become famous. Dreama Walker is neighborhood girl Brenda Lally, who tips detectives to Ricky Moss (David Call), a local ne'er-do-well. Jonathan Cake appears as Colin Ledger, Det. Wheeler's husband.

In "Last Rites," Father Chris Shea (Denis O'Hare), a friend of Logan's former partner Lennie Briscoe, convinces Logan to reopen a 16-year-old homicide case. It jeopardizes both Logan's and Wheeler's careers because the prosecutor was ADA Driver, who, as a young ADA, ramrodded the case for personal gain. Now she will stop at nothing to bury the truth to run for Attorney General. Chris McKinney plays Randy Nichols, who has already served sixteen years and has another eight years left on his sentence. Kene Holliday plays a cold case detective, and Guy Boyd plays the original detective. James Murtaugh portrays Alan Bottner, whose son Peter and daughter-in-law Shannon were kill.

In "Frame," John Glover returns as Dr. Declan Gage, who manipulates Nicole Wallace (Olivia d'Abo) into killing Goren's brother Frank (Tony Goldwyn), then Gage kills her as well. Det. Fontanella (Daniel Oreskes) is on-scene at Frank's murder when Goren arrives. Ilana Levine plays Evelyn Carlson, Frank's ex-wife and mother of Goren's nephew Donny.

== Episodes ==
No. overall	No. in season	Title	Directed by	Written by	USA air date	NBC air date	Prod. code	U.S. viewers (millions)
134	1	"Amends"	Jesús S. Treviño	S : Warren Leight; S/T : Siobhan Byrne O'Connor	October 4, 2007	January 9, 2008	07003	3.75
The death of an officer named Kevin Quinn (Gerald McCullouch) pulls Goren from his compassionate leave as the case is given top priority, but his relentless investigation brings out information related to Eames' husband's death, and the fallout threatens to become catastrophic as the case is reopened, potentially freeing the man she blames for her loss.
135	2	"Seeds"	Jean de Segonzac	S : Warren Leight; S/T : Peter Blauner	October 11, 2007	January 16, 2008	07004	3.41
While recovering from the loss of his neighbor and the departure of his previous partner, Detective Logan and his new partner, Detective Nola Falacci, are on the case of a murder of an obstetrician killed in a ritualistic fashion while sorting out complex family dynamics, a doctor with a god complex, and so much spread around DNA that finding the real killer will be a miracle of genetics.: Alicia Witt joins the cast as Detective Nola Falacci.
136	3	"Smile"	Michael Smith	S : Warren Leight; S/T : Charlie Rubin	October 18, 2007	February 20, 2008	07005	4.54
Detectives Goren and Eames investigate the murder of a dentist which turns out to be connected to the death of one of his young patients. As Goren and Eames look into both murders, they follow a trail of counterfeit mouthwash from the streets of Harlem to the FDA.
137	4	"Lonelyville"	Constantine Makris	S : Warren Leight & Julie Martin; S/T : Jacquelyn Reingold	October 25, 2007	February 27, 2008	07006	3.61
When writer Noah Brezner awakens after a ménage-à-trois with a blonde and a brunette only to find the blonde dead, the brunette gone, and Noah with no idea what happened, Major Case is called in to investigate the death of a Jane Doe tied in Japanese bondage ropes, then strangled. Mike Logan and Nola Falacci are initially stumped by this lurid puzzle - their only clue to the girl's identity and demise is the pair of emeralds hanging from her ears.
138	5	"Depths"	Norberto Barba	S : Warren Leight & Julie Martin; S/T : Diana Son	November 1, 2007	March 5, 2008	07001	3.58
Terrorism is initially suspected after the body of a young Arabic diver (Amir Arison) washes up on the shore. The initial suspicions are that the dead man may have been planning a terrorist attack, according to FBI agents, until Goren learns that he is part of a treasure hunting team. Then, the detectives focus their attention on the victim's lover, Dana (Kelli Giddish) making her a prime suspect. Other possible suspects include a local coin dealer, Dana's ex-husband Tommy (Michael Cerveris), a private ship owner, the victim's diving partner Chilly (Eric Sheffer Stevens) and the founder of a philanthropic foundation who organized the expedition, Simon Harper (Frederick Weller).
139	6	"Courtship"	Jean de Segonzac	Warren Leight & Julie Martin	November 8, 2007	March 12, 2008	07002	3.28
Detectives Logan and Falacci investigate the shooting murder of the wife of a New York Supreme Court judge (Bruce MacVittie).
140	7	"Self-Made"	Ken Girotti	S : Warren Leight; S/T : Jerome Hairston	November 15, 2007	January 23, 2008	07007	8.20
Detectives Goren and Eames investigate the torture and murder of a young writer (Shamika Cotton), leading them to uncover a shocking conspiracy behind her shooting. When the detectives begin, they suspect the victim's boyfriend, a known drug dealer, may have had been involved in his late girlfriend's murder. They find him badly beaten when he comes to their attention, but then conclude that he and the other drug traffickers had nothing to do with the murder when his alibi checks out. Goren and Eames start to delve into the world of literature for more answers. They question the bad-boy writer (Pablo Schreiber) and his mentor Mr. Shill (Peter Coyote), both of whom were part of the same writing circle as the victim. Questioning her sleazy agent (Fisher Stevens) again, they get a lead from him that leads them down a trail of plagiarism, deception, and manipulation along the way to solving the crime.
141	8	"Offense"	Tom DiCillo	S : Julie Martin; T : Kate Rorick	November 29, 2007	February 13, 2008	07008	3.85
A rape trial goes wrong when a witness is killed, but the likely suspects – the football team members accused of the rape – turn out not so likely, and attention turns towards an attorney. Logan and Falacci uncover a complex web of deceit involving the ambitious Bronx ADA's (Andrew McCarthy) rape case against the group of college football players.
142	9	"Untethered"	Ken Girotti	Warren Leight, Charlie Rubin and Diana Son	December 6, 2007	February 6, 2008	07009	4.57
Goren investigates when his nephew Donny (Trevor Morgan), a prisoner who is bipolar, claims that inmates are being abused to the point of murder. Goren gets himself admitted into the psychiatric ward of the prison without the knowledge of his superiors, in order to investigate his nephew's accusations that the corrections officers are harming the inmates. After Goren goes undercover without clearing it with his superiors, he is placed on suspension by Chief of Detectives Moran, Eames and Captain Ross getting notes placed in their files for being involved in Goren's undercover operation. Then he goes after his brother Frank (Tony Goldwyn) to demand he tell him where Donny is, after he escaped from the prison facility.
143	10	"Senseless"	Jean de Segonzac	S : Warren Leight; T : Julie Martin; S/T : Siobhan Byrne O'Connor	December 13, 2007	January 30, 2008	07010	4.33
Logan and Falacci investigate the execution-style murder of three young college freshmen. Logan and Falacci are frustrated in their attempts to find suspects in the apparent gang shooting of the three students, who have no gang affiliations whatsoever.: After this episode, the season paused for six months for the 2007 Writers Guild of America strike.; This was also Alicia Witt's last episode.
144	11	"Purgatory"	Jesús S. Treviño	S : Warren Leight; S/T : Siobhan Byrne O'Connor	June 8, 2008	June 21, 2008	07011	4.52
Still on leave from the force, Goren decides to tip the balance in his favor with an undercover operation hoping that it will help him get back on the job, while Eames investigates a triple homicide which turns out to be related to Goren's case. When Eames finds out that Goren never informed her about his assignment, she becomes very upset, leading to a sizable rift between the partners.: Dean Winters guest stars as Detective Mike Stoat.
145	12	"Contract"	Jonathan Herron	S : Warren Leight; S/T : Peter Blauner	June 15, 2008	June 28, 2008	07012	3.35
Detectives Logan and Wheeler investigate the case of a television news anchor who is blackmailed by a popular tabloid gossip columnist. When the man goes to the NYPD and wears a wire for detectives, the car blows up and the columnist is killed, while the anchorman is severely injured. The detectives find themselves up to their eyeballs in suspects and motives, where no one theory and suspect can be ruled out as a possibility, because the columnist was extorting money from famous people, ostensibly to open a luxurious restaurant and trying to protect his younger sister. The list of suspects include a mobster whom the victim had some major gambling debts and a physician who has operated on many renowned athletes, as well as an unscrupulous filmmaker and his wife/assistant – a studio executive who is disturbed to hear about any drug involvement in relation to a huge star who recently died on set. As Logan and Wheeler begin to stitch together the pieces, they discover a sordid secret life of sex and deceit that could be a motivating factor in the crime.: Mary McCormack guest stars as her character Mary Shannon, from In Plain Sight.; Julianne Nicholson returns from maternity leave.
146	13	"Betrayed"	Michael Smith	S : Warren Leight and Charlie Rubin; T : Diana Son & Marygrace O'Shea	June 22, 2008	July 5, 2008	07013	4.69
Avery Hubert and Woody Sage, who are both cheating on their spouses, run off together and disappear. Woody's older wife is a former cop turned true crime author, Kathy Jarrow, who used to date Captain Ross, so he assigns Goren and Eames to the case. When Avery doesn't make it to her parents in Maine, they question her husband, Roy Hubert. Roy's ex-wife Trina Melda provides a sex tape with Roy as an alibi. Kathy becomes a suspect soon afterwards.
147	14	"Assassin"	Norberto Barba	S : Warren Leight; T : Eric Overmyer; S/T : Julie Martin	June 29, 2008	July 12, 2008	07014	4.04
Detectives Logan and Wheeler investigate a murder attempt against a woman, shortly after returning to the United States from South Asia. A political martyr and influential leader, Bela Khan (Indira Varma), leads an ethnic group and clearly appears to be the target of a political assassination. Along with collecting evidence, Logan and Wheeler examine the body of the shooter, taken out by her bodyguard, but not before the assassin could get off two shots, one of which felled her young woman assistant, who sacrificed her own life, diving in front of her boss to take the fatal bullet. At first, the detectives turn their suspicion to the bodyguard, but the activist family completely trusts their hired security, and rejects the possibility that the man could be complicit in a murder attempt. Then, the detectives decide to place the notorious woman under strict surveillance for her protection. Meanwhile, an FBI agent learns of an assassin who has entered the country and whom he suspects of putting together another attempt of murder against her. Protected by security guards, she makes her next public appearance during a memorial speech for her assistant. Nevertheless, the detectives are surprised when they learn that her loyal bodyguard is shot down by a sniper while being transported to a police detention center, far removed from the cemetery speech. The case takes a new twist when Logan and Wheeler delve deeper into the woman's wealthy family.
148	15	"Please Note We Are No Longer Accepting Letters of Recommendation from Henry Kissinger"	Kevin Bray	S : Warren Leight; T : Marygrace O'Shea	July 6, 2008	July 19, 2008	07015	4.88
While taking his three-year-old son on an evening stroll in the park, stock analyst Skip Lowe (Jason Pendergraft) is gunned down by someone familiar to him. While the detectives are investigating the shooting, Paloma Renzi (Lisa Kathleen McMahan), the mother of another toddler, is gunned down under similar circumstances. Detectives Goren and Eames find a connection between the two victims, but when a third parent with a three-year-old surfaces as a victim (and turns out to be the first victim), she seems to have no connection to Skip and Paloma, so Goren and Eames shift their focus to the Day Care Center that all three children have in common, where there is an exclusive and long waiting list.: This episode's title is the longest title of any episode in the Law & Order franchise.
149	16	"Reunion"	Jean de Segonzac	S : Warren Leight; S/T : Jacquelyn Reingold	July 13, 2008	July 26, 2008	07016	4.89
Television talk show host Silvia Rhodes (Joan Jett) is bludgeoned to death by a champagne bottle. Her murder may link to her former avocation as a groupie to famous musician Jordie Black (Michael Massee), Detective Wheeler's favorite rock star from her high school days, whose secret past pushes Wheeler's admiration to the brink. Rhodes' death puts Jordie Black and his wife Tara Black (Dana Wheeler-Nicholson) right at the top of the suspects list, along with Rhodes' son Milo (Noel Fisher), Rhodes' assistant Ava (Denise Ramirez), and the family attorney (David Patrick Kelly). But the motive behind Silvia Rhodes's murder isn't as it appears when the detectives learn who the true suspect is.
150	17	"Vanishing Act"	Peter Werner	S : Warren Leight; S/T : Jerome Hairston	July 20, 2008	August 2, 2008	07017	4.83
Detectives Goren and Eames investigate the case of a man found dead in strange circumstances following a magic act. The opening shows two very different acts of illusionism, one by Miles Stone (Jeremy Gender), a young escapologist and TV celebrity figure, and the other by The Great Carmine (Christopher Lloyd), an alcoholic has-been. While Stone is doing a stunt where he is buried for over 30 days, Carmine is performing a trick where a pretty woman hides in a box and appearances are she’s being skewered with swords. But the acts takes on a new twist when both stunts go awry after Stone appears to become ill in the underground casket, and when the casket is opened, he is not in there. Simultaneously, Carmine opens his own magic box to find Stone in there, with seven swords stuck in his body. During the investigation, Goren and Eames question Carmine, and find that his original assistant disappeared from the job for a vacation, and her replacement also seems to have vanished after Stone's body is found. Though the old man has not completely been eliminated as a suspect, he offered an alibi that leads them to realise other people could have been involved. The list of suspects include Dean Holiday (James Frain), a renowned illusionist who, along with Stone, was trained by the old magician, as well as Jacob Green (Will Janowitz), a highly skilled technician who was in charge of Stone’s act. It is clear that the small circle of suspects had their own motives for wanting this magician dead. After further testing shows that the victim had been given potassium chloride through his I.V. drip, mimicking a heart attack, the detectives focus their attention on the missing mystery woman, who could be the final puzzle piece to solving the case.
151	18	"Ten Count"	Alex Chapple	S : Warren Leight; S/T : Julie Martin	July 27, 2008	September 6, 2008	07018	4.32
Detectives Logan and Wheeler investigate the world of amateur boxing after the brother of a young man that Logan once mentored is stabbed to death outside a nightclub while trying to play peacemaker in a bar quarrel, a few hours after winning a prize fight. Logan commits himself and Wheeler to solving the crime, the detectives piece together the setups and payoffs make life outside the ring just as dangerous as life inside it, but they have to establish that the confrontation may have been staged. Logan commits himself and Wheeler to solving the crime. Unfortunately, as he and Wheeler explore the world of amateur boxing, secrets and betrayals complicate the case.
152	19	"Legacy"	Betty Kaplan	S : Warren Leight; T : Kate Rorick; S/T : Alan Kingsberg	August 3, 2008	September 10, 2008	07019	4.92
Detectives Goren and Eames investigate the case of Paul Phillips, a student at an elite private school, found dead, hanging from overhead pipes in the boiler room. The detectives survey the crime scene and meet a Renaissance art teacher, Mrs. Anna Nobile (Joanna P. Adler), who found the boy's body. They learn that she has a daughter, Tessa (Sarah Steele), who also is a student at the school. Preliminary findings indicate that the death appears to be suicide, until Goren looks below the surface. He discovers fresh mud on Paul's sneakers, while Eames adds that the knot was a sailing knot and Paul's cellphone and backpack are missing. They tell Captain Ross about the victim. His father is a corporate raider, known for toughness, as Goren theorizes the man was embarrassed by his son. Then, the detectives meet with the victim's parents. The mother says he was looking forward to his school prom, but she doesn't know how it went because they went out of town to a regatta. The father does not respond well, insulting them. In the morgue, Dr. Rodgers informs detectives that the cause of the young man's death was asphyxiation by hanging, but his skull was bashed in. Rodgers shows them the two- to three-day-old bruises all over his body, concluding the victim was brutally beaten before his death. Goren and Eames go talk to Jack Walker (Anthony Carrigan), a boy the grief counselor said Paul might be friends with. At home, Jack shows the detectives a make-out, grotesque cartoon the victim made. Later, a police computer technician shows them the video of a girls group, wearing sports goggles and masks, attacking Paul, knocking him down, kicking and punching him furiously. Nevertheless, the investigators cannot prove their theories until meticulous research yields a lost clue that could be the missing link to resolve the case.: Based on the Horace Mann School controversy.
153	20	"Neighborhood Watch"	Kevin Bray	S : Warren Leight; S/T : Eric Overmyer	August 10, 2008	September 13, 2008	07020	4.16
A neighborhood receives notices from a watch group that a sex offender is moving in. The entire community is soon making the offender's life miserable. The following day, his headless body is found floating in the Maspeth Creek. Logan and Wheeler learn that offender, Kyle Jones, pleaded guilty to statutory rape. He was 19, she was 15. He served five years and was staying at his mother's house when the murder happened. Both Jones' mother and the girl in question say that the sex was consensual, and the complaint was filed by the girl's parents and prosecuted by Terri Driver (Leslie Hope), an ADA who has since made a name for herself. The detectives' investigation uncovers official misconduct in the DA's office, and makes Logan some new enemies.: Inspired by the murder and decapitation of Daniel Sorenson.
154	21	"Last Rites"	Tom DiCillo	S : Warren Leight and Peter Blauner; T : Siobhan Byrne O'Connor & Marygrace O'Shea	August 17, 2008	September 17, 2008	07021	4.64
Logan and Wheeler's jobs are both put at risk when a priest convinces him to reopen a case that may reveal the corruption of an ADA who will go to any length necessary -- including getting Logan and Wheeler removed from their jobs -- to keep the truth a secret.: This was Chris Noth's final episode; he was replaced the following season by Jeff Goldblum.; Denis O'Hare would later return to the role of Father Shea in the 2013 Law & Order: Special Victims Unit season 14 episode "Presumed Guilty."
155	22	"Frame"	Norberto Barba	S : Warren Leight; T : Julie Martin & Kate Rorick	August 24, 2008	September 20, 2008	07022	5.20
Detective Robert Goren is visited by the past when he finds a picture at his mother's grave that indicates an old nemesis has returned. The case becomes more complex when his brother and a mentor reappear. Goren's brother Frank (Tony Goldwyn) is murdered, and Nicole Wallace (Olivia d'Abo) appears to be the killer. After that, the people he holds closest to him end up in grave danger, and Goren will be pushed to the breaking point to solve his toughest case yet.: Warren Leight's last episode as executive producer, and his second last (of 60) episodes as writer or "story by", later writing a season 10 episode

Preceded by Season Six	List of Law & Order: Criminal Intent episodes	Succeeded by Season Eight
