= Toby Hemingway =

English actor (born 1983)

- Born: Toby Michael C. A. Hemingway; 28 May 1983 (age 42); Brighton, Sussex, England, UK
- Occupation: Actor
- Years active: 2005–present

Toby Michael C. A. Hemingway (born 28 May 1983) is an English actor. He is known for playing Reid Garwin in the 2006 supernatural thriller The Covenant, and for his film roles in Black Swan (2010), and Playback (2012).

== Early life ==
The son of authors Mike and Anna-Maria Hemingway, Toby Hemingway was born in Brighton, Sussex, where he spent his childhood with his older brother, Jay. At thirteen, he moved to Ojai, California, USA with his mother.

After graduating from high school in 2001 from Laurel Springs School, which provides homeschooling and online education, he attended the American Academy of Dramatic Arts in New York City where he earned an associate degree in Fine Arts.

== Acting career ==
In 2005, he appeared in select episodes of the series Summerland and Bones. The following year, he had his first major film role in The Covenant. In 2007, he went on to star in Feast of Love and in 2008, he appeared in select episodes of CSI: Miami. In July 2010, he played the love interest in Taylor Swift's music video "Mine". Later in 2010, he landed a minor role in Black Swan.

In 2012, Hemingway played a supporting role on The Finder as Willa's romani cousin Timo Proud.

== Filmography ==
=== Film ===
Year	Title	Role	Notes
2006	The Covenant	Reid Garwin	
2007	1 Out of 7	Eric	
2007	Feast of Love	Oscar	
2010	Black Swan	Tom	
2011	In Time	Timekeeper Kors	
2012	Playback	Quinn	
2012	The Silent Thief	Brennan Marley	
2013	Syrup	Narrator	Uncredited
2014	The Ganzfeld Haunting	Graves	
2015	Charlie, Trevor and a Girl Savannah	Trevor	
2016	Undrafted	Palacco	
2016	The Girl in the Photographs	Ben	
2017	Division 19	Barca	
2017	The Monster Project	Bryan	
2017	Battlecreek	Cy	

=== Television ===
Year	Title	Role	Notes
2005	Bones	Tucker Pattison	Episode: "A Boy in a Tree"
2005	Summerland	Jason Warner	Episode: "Signs"
2008	CSI: Miami	Trey Holt	Episode: "Rock and a Hard Place"
2012	The Finder	Timo Proud	Recurring role
2016	Prototype	Forde	Television film
2016	Hell on Wheels	Isaac Vinson	2 episodes
2017	Lethal Weapon	Bobby Claypool	Episode: "Born to Run"
2018	The Crossing	Gabe	Recurring role
2022	FBI: Most Wanted	Harley Ross	Episode: "Shattered"
2025	The Abandons	Willem Van Ness	Recurring role
