= Playback (2012 film) =

Playback (Fantastic Fist Blood)
- Promotional poster
- Directed by: Michael A. Nickles
- Written by: Michael A. Nickles
- Produced by: John M. Bennett; Lawrence Robbins; Randall Emmett; George Furla; Chris Heldman
- Starring: Alessandra Torresani; Ambyr Childers; Johnny Pacar; Christian Slater; Jonathan Keltz; Jennifer Missoni
- Cinematography: Mark Petersen
- Edited by: Ellen Goldwasser
- Music by: Woody Pak
- Production company: Emmett/Furla Films
- Distributed by: Magnet Releasing
- Release date: March 9, 2012
- Running time: 98 minutes
- Country: United States
- Language: English
- Budget: $1.5 million
- Box office: $54,945

Playback is a 2012 horror film directed and written by Michael A. Nickles. Pre-production of the film started in June 2010 in Grand Rapids, Michigan. John M. Bennett and Lawrence Robbins are the producers of the film. The film stars Alessandra Torresani, Ambyr Childers, Johnny Pacar, Toby Hemingway, Jonathan Keltz, Jennifer Missoni, and Christian Slater.

== Plot ==
On October 21, 1994, Harlan Diehl (Luke Bonczyk) murders his family at their farmhouse and he is shot by the police, as he kills his sister. The tragedy leaves behind video footage (which he had taped) and his sister's baby, who lives. Fifteen years later in Marshall, Michigan, an ambitious high school student Julian Miller (Johnny Pacar), is tasked with completing a film assignment on forgotten local stories for journalism class. Choosing the Harlan Diehl case, though it goes against the wishes of his mother, Anne Miller (Lisa Jane Todd), he selects his girlfriend, Riley (Ambyr Childers), to be his project partner, and borrows camera equipment and archive footage from his reserved former coworker at a video store, Quinn (Toby Hemingway), who has since become a news station cataloger. He also recruits his fun-loving friends, DeeDee Baker (Jennifer Missoni), Nate (Jonathan Keltz), and Brianna Baker (Alessandra Torresani) to re-enact the murder scene, allowing him to produce a gory slasher movie.

One night, Quinn watches footage from the aftermath of the tragedy, where Harlan is taken away after having been shot. Still alive, Harlan awakes as the video intercuts, leading to the spiritual possession of Quinn's body by way of video playback transmission. Besides cataloging footage, Quinn is paid by a perverted cop, Officer Frank Lyons (Christian Slater), to set up spy cameras to privately record teenage girls, using this chance to initially possess Brianna, who finds and looks into the camera. He begins to kill people, starting with a coworker at his news station. Meanwhile, Julian and Riley discover that Harlan, whose parents died when he was four, bounced around from foster home to foster home until he was adopted by the Diehls, and that he is the descendant of Louis Le Prince, the inventor of cinematography. They locate the Diehl house to record footage, in the process finding out that there was a baby in the family, omitted from the reports.

At work, Julian's disabled coworker, Wylie (Daryl Mitchell), tells him about an ancient legend involving Louis Le Prince, who is believed to have invented a way to steal souls, taking the soul of his son, Adolphe, and replacing it with his own demonic spirit simply by filming him in the motion picture, Roundhay Garden Scene. The evil spirit would then possess each child in the bloodline from father to son, from generation to generation, which explains the Diehl family case. Sometime later, Nate is killed by Brianna, who has become possessed. As Frank is assigned to investigate Nate's disappearance, Quinn kills Brianna, and DeeDee is possessed by Quinn through a spy camera that she finds. Next, Quinn kidnaps Riley and kills Frank and DeeDee, while Julian asks a retired newscaster, Chris Safford (Mark Metcalf), about the Diehl case. He learns Harlan raped his adoptive sister and together they conceived a baby. Their parents planned to put the baby up for adoption in order to cover up the incident, but Harlan objected and killed them. Afterward, the baby was adopted by Julian's police officer mother, Anne, meaning that Julian is Harlan's child. Having acquired tapes from Frank, Quinn discovers this by watching police-owned footage showing Anne taking the baby.

Quinn kidnaps Julian, and restrains Julian and Riley in the Diehl home. Before Quinn can possess Julian, the electricity goes out. Quinn heads upstairs from the basement to fix the issue and buy Riley time to free herself from the restraints and rescue Julian from the other room before they flee. On their way out, they stumble across Nate's dead body. They hide until Julian's armed mother Anne arrives, suspecting trouble after trying to contact Julian. Quinn shoots her with his gun and this forces Julian and Riley out to save her. They fight Quinn, though he subdues them and prepares to use his phone to film and possess Julian, as an injured Anne, wearing armor, shoots down Quinn. The next day, Anne is hospitalized and Julian and Riley see the police report about the recent murders. Shortly after, Julian receives a video message and Quinn uses it to possess Julian.

== Production ==
Playback was filmed in 2010 in the Grand Rapids, Michigan area, including Cascade and East Grand Rapids, Lowell High School, and music store The Beat Goes On. The film was distributed by Magnet Releasing.

== Reception ==
On the review aggregator website Rotten Tomatoes, 0% of 6 critics' reviews are positive, with an average rating of 2.8/10.

== Release ==
Although a theatrical release, Playback was shown in only a single cinema. Playback was declared the lowest-grossing film of the 2012 year by Movieline, grossing just $264 from its one-theater release, $252 on its opening night and $12 more during its first week, after which it was pulled. These figures reflect approximately 44 tickets sold.
