= Division 19 =

- Directed by: S. A. Halewood
- Written by: S. A. Halewood
- Produced by: S. A. Halewood
- Starring: Jamie Draven; Linus Roache; Will Rothhaar; Lotte Verbeek; Toby Hemingway; Alison Doody; Clarke Peters
- Cinematography: Ben Moulden
- Edited by: Jessica Brunetto; Laura Morrod
- Production companies: Division 19; Gas Station 8
- Distributed by: Uncork'd Entertainment
- Release dates: 24 February 2017 (Fantasporto Film Festival); 5 April 2019 (US)
- Running time: 90 minutes
- Countries: United States; United Kingdom
- Language: English
- Box office: $2,680

Division 19 is a 2017 British-American dystopian political thriller film directed and written by S. A. Halewood. The film stars Linus Roache, Clarke Peters, Alison Doody and Jamie Draven.

== Cast ==
- Jamie Draven as Hardin Jones
- Linus Roache as Charles Lyndon
- Alison Doody as Neilsen
- Clarke Peters as Perelman
- Lotte Verbeek as Aisha
- Will Rothhaar as Nash
- L. Scott Caldwell as Michelle Jacobs
- Toby Hemingway as Barca
- Ashton Moio as Dale Peretti
- Anthony Okungbowa as Martins
- Tim Jo as Alden
- Jennifer Soo as George

== Plot ==
Division 19 looks at the loss of personal anonymity in 2039. The new TV show uses real record of personalities. Hackers anonymous organization has help prisoner, who filmed by hidden cameras for the TV real series, to escape from being tracked by the hidden recording.

=== Filming ===
The filming of the Division 19 began on July 30, 2013, in Detroit, Michigan and continued in Los Angeles and London. Editing took place in London 2017 and the film will be released 2018.

Executive Producers: Adam Draper, Diane Kasperowicz, David Mutch, Kathryn Sheard and Melissa Simmonds.

== Awards ==
WINNER Critics' Award, Fantasporto Film Festival

WINNER Best Director Suzie Halewood, Boston Science Fiction Film Festival 2018.
