= The Monster Project =

- Theatrical release poster
- Directed by: Victor Mathieu
- Written by: Corbin Billings; Shariya Lynn; Victor Mathieu
- Story by: Shariya Lynn; Victor Mathieu
- Produced by: Corbin Billings; Michael Burkenbine; Victor Mathieu; Phillip Sebal
- Starring: Justin Bruening; Murielle Zuker; Jamal Evans; Yvonne Zima; Steven Flores; Shiori Ideta; James Storm; Susan Stangl; Toby Hemingway
- Cinematography: Phillip Sebal
- Edited by: Phillip Sebal
- Music by: Emir Işılay; Pinar Toprak
- Distributed by: Epic Pictures Group
- Release dates: July 14, 2017 (Bucheon); August 18, 2017 (United States)
- Running time: 99 minutes
- Country: United States
- Language: English
- Budget: $250,000

The Monster Project is a 2017 American found footage supernatural horror film directed by Victor Mathieu from a screenplay written by Mathieu, Corbin Billings and Shariya Lynn. The film stars Justin Bruening, Murielle Zuker, Jamal Evans, Yvonne Zima, Steven Flores, Shiori Ideta, James Storm, Susan Stangl, and Toby Hemingway. It follows a documentary film crew who interview three people claiming to be "real life" monsters and must fight for their lives when their interviewees transform into a demon, a vampire, and a skinwalker, respectively.

The Monster Project was theatrically released in the United States on August 18, 2017 by Epic Pictures Group. The film received mixed reviews from critics.

== Plot ==
Up-and-coming YouTuber Devon makes fake videos about monster appearances. For his next project, he wants to interview real monsters and places an advertisement on Craigslist. Along with his cameraman Jamal, Devon finds three participants: police officer Steven, who claims to be a skinwalker; tattoo artist Shayla, who claims to be a vampire; and young Asian student Shiori, who claims to be possessed by a demon. Devon hires his ex-girlfriend Murielle and Jamal's childhood friend Bryan, who is recovering from drug addiction, to assist with the documentary.

The group rent an abandoned house from old couple Richard and Martha to conduct the interviews, despite Richard's warning that the property was used for satanic rituals in the past. After installing their equipment, Devon shows the participants some artifacts linked to each monster's mythology to use if necessary. He reveals they are recording on the night of a lunar eclipse.

As the interviews progress, Shayla reveals that Bryan is secretly using drugs, sparking an argument among the team. When the eclipse occurs, Steven transforms into a skinwalker and attacks the team. They lock him in a room, but Jamal is injured in the process. Shiori is possessed by the demon and the team is forced to flee towards the attic, where they are attacked by Shayla in her vampiric form. Murielle is bitten in the neck and Jamal fatally impales Shayla with a stake through the heart.

The team learn that Shiori has supernaturally locked all the doors and windows, and Steven is roaming the house to attack them. They hide in the basement, where Bryan finds a way out, but is stopped by a goat skull-masked figure in front of him. Shiori appears and attacks Bryan before she is restrained and an exorcism is performed. When the demon temporarily possesses Murielle, he reveals his name is Baphomet and returns to Shiori's body until Bryan stabs her in the head with a crucifix, killing her. Steven breaks into the basement and Jamal, whose wound has worsened, sacrifices himself while Devon, Bryan, and Murielle flee.

Devon is separated from Bryan and Murielle, who lock themselves in a room. Murielle begins to vomit blood due to Shayla's bite and gradually transforms into a vampire. She attacks Bryan, who kills her with a stake through the head. Bryan manages to escape the house but Steven pursues him to an abandoned cabin nearby. He discovers several strange symbols and monitors that are recording everything that happened in the house. Steven attacks again, but Bryan fatally impales him with a spear he found.

Suddenly, Devon, now possessed by Baphomet, knocks Bryan unconscious and reveals that he orchestrated the events to summon the Antichrist. The goat skull-masked figure is revealed as Richard, who is a member of a demonic sect along with Martha. The corpses of Shayla, Steven, Shiori, Jamal, and Murielle are brought to a pentagram, where Martha slices Bryan's neck and uses his blood for the ritual. A horned and winged shadow appears and roars loudly, knocking over the camera as the recording stops. Bryan is revealed to be a vampire, having been bitten by Murielle before.

== Cast ==
- Justin Bruening as Devon
- Toby Hemingway as Bryan
- Murielle Zuker as Murielle
- Jamal Quezaire as Jamal
- Yvonne Zima as Shayla / Vampire
- Steven Flores as Steven / Skinwalker
- Shiori Ideta as Shiori / Demon
- Jim Storm as Richard
- Susan Stangl as Martha

== Reception ==
On the review aggregator website Rotten Tomatoes, the film has an approval rating of 50% based on 6 reviews and an average score of 5/10.
