= The Covenant (2006 film) =

Film by Renny Harlin

- Theatrical release poster
- Directed by: Renny Harlin
- Written by: J. S. Cardone
- Produced by: Gary Lucchesi; Tom Rosenberg
- Starring: Steven Strait; Sebastian Stan; Laura Ramsey; Taylor Kitsch; Toby Hemingway; Jessica Lucas; Chace Crawford; Wendy Crewson
- Cinematography: Pierre Gill
- Edited by: Nicolas de Toth
- Music by: Tomandandy
- Production companies: Screen Gems; Lakeshore Entertainment; Sandstorm Films
- Distributed by: Sony Pictures Releasing
- Release date: September 8, 2006
- Running time: 97 minutes
- Countries: United States; Canada
- Language: English
- Budget: $20 million
- Box office: $37.6 million

The Covenant is a 2006 dark fantasy horror film directed by Renny Harlin and written by J. S. Cardone. The film stars Steven Strait, Sebastian Stan, Laura Ramsey, Taylor Kitsch, Jessica Lucas, Toby Hemingway and Chace Crawford. It is an international co-production film between the United States and Canada.

The Covenant was released in the United States by Sony Pictures Releasing on September 8, 2006. Despite receiving negative reviews from critics, it was a moderate box office success.

== Plot ==
In Ipswich, Massachusetts, 4 high school boys – Caleb Danvers, Pogue Parry, Reid Garwin and Tyler Simms, collectively known as the "Sons of Ipswich" – possess magical abilities as the descendants of the four remaining colonial witch families. Magic manifests on a witch's 13th birthday and grows stronger until they "ascend" at 18, upon which their powers increase significantly. However, use of magic can be addictive, with overuse causing accelerated aging, insanity, and death.

At a bonfire party the Sons meet Sarah Wenham and Chase Collins, both new students at their school; Caleb and Sarah become romantically involved soon thereafter. When a student is found dead near the school campus, various paranormal occurrences begin to occur, with Sarah and Pogue's girlfriend Kate Tunney being the primary targets. Caleb suspects Reid, the most reckless of the group, but he denies the accusation. After Caleb observes Chase using magic during a swimming competition, he discovers that Chase is the descendent of a 5th family of witches long believed to be extinct. As the Sons discuss this revelation, Pogue learns that Kate has been rendered comatose by a spell. He confronts Chase, but is defeated and hospitalized.

Caleb confronts Chase, who reveals that he was adopted; unaware of the origin and cost of his powers, he became addicted to them, and believes he can stave off the ill effects of overuse by forcing other ascended witches to transfer their power to him. Caleb reveals the truth to Sarah and takes her to his father William, whose 44-year-old body is decrepitly aged from magic abuse. When Sarah suggests that one of the other three Sons transfer their power to Caleb so he could fight Chase, he refuses as it would cost the person offering their life.

On the night of Caleb's 18th birthday, he leaves to face Chase while Reid and Tyler safeguard Sarah, though Chase easily kidnaps her and demands Caleb's powers for her return. He refuses and the two duel, though Caleb is outmatched even after he ascends mid-battle. William sacrifices his life by transferring his powers to Caleb: with his father's power infused within him, he strikes Chase with a final blow that engulfs him. Sarah, Kate and Pogue recover, and Caleb and Sarah drive off hand-in-hand.

== Cast ==
- Steven Strait as Caleb Danvers, one of the four Sons of Ipswich. He attends Spenser Academy with the other Sons and is the oldest and most responsible and protective among the four. He is very cautious about using the Power due to its effect on his father and is the first to ascend.
- Sebastian Stan as Chase Collins, a new student at Spenser who befriends the Sons of Ipswich
- Laura Ramsey as Sarah Wenham, a new student at Spenser who transfers from a Boston public school, Caleb's love interest and Kate's friend
- Taylor Kitsch as Pogue Parry, one of the four Sons of Ipswich; the oldest after Caleb and his best friend. He is also Kate's boyfriend.
- Jessica Lucas as Kate Tunney, Sarah's roommate and Pogue's girlfriend
- Toby Hemingway as Reid Garwin, one of the four Sons of Ipswich and the most reckless and sassiest of the four, who often butts heads with Caleb
- Chace Crawford as Tyler Simms, one of the four Sons of Ipswich; the youngest of the four, who is the closest to Reid and usually takes his side
- Kyle Schmid as Aaron Abbot, a pompous student and jock
- Sarah Smyth as Kira Snider, a snobby student and Aaron's girlfriend
- Wendy Crewson as Evelyn Danvers, Caleb's alcoholic mother, who worries about her son Ascending and becoming like his father
- Stephen McHattie as William Danvers III, Caleb's father
- Kenneth Welsh as Provost Higgins, head of Spenser Academy
- Jon McLaren as Bordy Becklin

== Graphic novel ==
A comic book prequel to the film was released by Top Cow Comics. Top Cow Comics founder Marc Silvestri also served as associate producer for the film.

== Reception ==
=== Critical response ===
On the review aggregator website Rotten Tomatoes, 4% of 75 critics' reviews are positive, with an average rating of 2.90/10. The website's consensus reads: "The Covenant plays out like a teen soap opera, full of pretty faces, wooden acting, laughable dialogue, and little suspense." It is ranked 89th on the website's list of the 100 Worst Movies of All Time. Metacritic, which uses a weighted average, assigned the film a score of 19 out of 100, based on 16 critics, indicating "overwhelming dislike". Audiences polled by CinemaScore gave the film an average grade of "B−" on an A+ to F scale.

The Covenant has been considered a cult film, with several critics pointing out the film's unintentional, queer-coded subtext and homoerotic appeal.

=== Box office ===
Upon its release in the United States, the film managed to top the box office charts with a $8.9 million opening on what was called a "weak" weekend. By the end of its theatrical run, The Covenant earned $23.3 million in the U.S. and $13.9 million in other territories for a total of $37.3 million worldwide. The film cost roughly $20 million to produce, not including marketing.

== Home media ==
The Covenant was released on DVD and Blu-ray on January 2, 2007. It went on to sell 1,618,891 units, which translated to revenue of $26,578,576.

== See also ==
- List of films about witchcraft
