= Feast of Love =

2007 film by Robert Benton

- Theatrical release poster
- Directed by: Robert Benton
- Screenplay by: Allison Burnett
- Based on: The Feast of Love by Charles Baxter
- Produced by: Tom Rosenberg; Gary Lucchesi; Richard S. Wright
- Starring: Morgan Freeman; Greg Kinnear; Radha Mitchell; Billy Burke; Selma Blair; Alexa Davalos; Toby Hemingway; Jane Alexander; Fred Ward
- Cinematography: Kramer Morgenthau
- Edited by: Andrew Mondshein
- Music by: Stephen Trask
- Production companies: Metro-Goldwyn-Mayer Pictures; Lakeshore Entertainment; Revelations Entertainment; GreeneStreet Films
- Distributed by: MGM Distribution Co.
- Release date: September 28, 2007
- Running time: 102 minutes
- Country: United States
- Language: English
- Box office: $5.7 million

Feast of Love is a 2007 American drama film directed by Robert Benton (his last film before his death in 2025), and starring an ensemble cast that includes Morgan Freeman, Greg Kinnear, Radha Mitchell, Billy Burke, Selma Blair, Alexa Davalos, Toby Hemingway, and Jane Alexander. The film, based on the 2000 novel The Feast of Love by Charles Baxter.

The movie deals with love and its many permutations, set within a community of friends in Portland, Oregon. Harry Stevenson, a local community college professor, provides narration throughout the film about how love can affect one's life.

It was first released on September 28, 2007, in the United States.

== Plot ==
=== Bradley ===
Bradley runs a small cafe in Portland. He has been married to his wife Kathryn for six years. Their marriage becomes strained when Kathryn begins a lesbian affair with Jenny, whom she meets playing softball. She leaves Bradley.

The divorce affects Bradley greatly, but he soon finds love again with Diana, a real estate agent who has a history with a married man named David. Though she ends her affair with David to marry Bradley, they ultimately declare they are in love with each other and Diana leaves Bradley, again devastating him.

Now twice divorced, Bradley suffers an emotional breakdown and stabs himself in the hand. As his hand is being sutured at the hospital, he falls for his doctor, Margit. In the film's conclusion, the two are revealed to marry.

=== Oscar and Chloe ===
Oscar is a young man working at Bradley's cafe who soon meets and falls in love with a girl named Chloe. However, he is revealed to be living with his alcoholically abusive father, Bat. When Chloe visits a fortune-teller, she is told that Oscar will die. Although upset at first, she straightens her resolve about her love for Oscar and their future together. Coming home, Chloe urges Oscar to marry her immediately. At the wedding, she reveals to Harry that she is pregnant, and plans to have another baby right after due to Harry's advice of having "two."

In the film's conclusion everybody gathers for an afternoon in the park. While playing football, Oscar collapses; despite an attempt to get him to a hospital, congested traffic interferes, and he dies of a heart defect. Bat attempts to avenge his son's death by harming Chloe but Harry scares him off, and then asks her if he and his wife Esther can 'adopt' her as their own.

=== Diana and David ===
Diana is a successful realtor and has been carrying on an affair with the married David. Though she asks him numerous times to leave his wife of 11 years, Karen, he cannot bring himself to do it. Their relationship becomes even more volatile when Diana begins dating Bradley and falls in love with him.

David insists he loves Diana, but is unable to leave his wife. Diana marries Bradley and ends her affair with him. However, their love is later rekindled when Karen discovers David was cheating, leaving him.

Free at last, David and Diana have an emotional confrontation in the park that ends with a kiss that Oscar and Chloe happen to see (and viewers can assume they tell Bradley), fueling their divorce and Bradley stabbing himself. In the film's conclusion Diana and David are shown as a public and functionally happy couple.

=== Harry and Esther ===
Harry and his wife Esther have been married a long time. He is a patron at Bradley's cafe and often provides the younger generation with advice on love. However, it is revealed that Harry and Esther are masking their own grief after the death of their adult son, Aaron. Harry reveals the nature of his son's death to Chloe, whom he and Esther grow very close to.

Harry has also been struggling with the decision of going back to work as a professor at a university. In the film's conclusion, after Oscar's death, Harry and Esther offer to adopt a now widowed and pregnant Chloe, who tearfully accepts their offer.

== Cast ==
- Morgan Freeman as Harry Stevenson
- Greg Kinnear as Bradley Smith
- Radha Mitchell as Diana Croce
- Billy Burke as David Watson
- Selma Blair as Kathryn Smith
- Alexa Davalos as Chloe Barlow
- Toby Hemingway as Oscar Gamlen
- Jane Alexander as Esther Stevenson
- Fred Ward as Bat Gamlen
- Stana Katic as Jenny
- Erika Marozsán as Dr. Margit Vekashi
- Margo Martindale as Mrs. Maggarolian

== Home media ==
- Feast of Love released Tuesday, February 5, 2008, on DVD & Blu-Ray.

== Production ==
While many of the movie's scenes are set at Portland State University, the nearby campuses of Western Seminary and Reed College were the actual locations of filming. Locations at Reed include the Blue Bridge, the front lawn and Eliot Circle. Scenes in the Jitters Cafe, owned by Kinnear's character, were filmed at the Fresh Pot at the corner of N Mississippi Avenue and Shaver streets in Portland.

Asked if Radha Mitchell needed any coaxing for the full frontal fight sequence where she and her married lover have at it, Robert Benton replied: "Not at all. Radha wanted to do a second take, and I thought, 'Are you insane?' I've learned when an actor says, let's go again, to do it. There's a little moment when she's smoking after lovemaking, and they're laughing together. I had nothing to do with that scene, except saying 'Action' and 'Cut.'"

== Critical reception ==
The film received mixed reviews from critics. As of June 2020, it holds a 39% approval rating on the review aggregator Rotten Tomatoes, based on 117 reviews with an average rating of 5.29/10. The website's critics consensus reads: "Though beautifully photographed, Feast of Love offers little beyond a trite, melodramatic character drama." Metacritic reported the film had an average score of 51 out of 100, based on 28 reviews.

In his lukewarm review, Roger Ebert stated, "No movie can be very good that contains Fred Ward's worst performance (it's the fault of the character, to be sure)."

== Box office ==
In its opening weekend, the film grossed US$1.7 million in 1,200 theaters in the United States and Canada, ranking #12 at the box office. It grossed a total of US$5.4 million worldwide – US$3.5 million in the United States and Canada and US$1.9 million in other territories.
