= Jennifer Missoni =

Italian film and television actress (born 1985)

- Born: Jennifer Goldie Diamante Missoni; April 3, 1985 (age 41); Italy
- Occupations: Film and television actress
- Years active: 2007-2018

Jennifer Goldie Diamante Missoni (born April 3, 1985) is an Italian film and television actress. She is known for playing high school student DeeDee Baker in the 2012 film Playback. Her television appearances include Gossip Girl, Law & Order: Criminal Intent and Inferno: A Linda Lovelace Story.

Missoni attended Idyllwild Arts Academy. She is the granddaughter of Ottavio Missoni, founder of the fashion company Missoni.

== Filmography ==
=== Film ===
Year	Title	Role	Notes
2008	Claustrophobic Happiness	Nelson	Short film
2009	The Whirling Dervish	Anna	Short film
2010	Missoni		Short film
2011	Where Is Victor Black?		Short film
2012	Wifed Out	Becky	
2012	Playback	DeeDee Baker	
2013	Inferno: A Linda Lovelace Story	Becky	
2014	London Fields	Tasty Girl	
2016	Killer App	Barclay	

=== Television ===
Year	Title	Role	Notes
2007	Law & Order	Anna Sakalov	Episode: "Fallout"
2007	Damages	Attractive Woman	Episodes: "A Regular Earl Anthony", "She Spat at Me"
2007	Law & Order: Criminal Intent	Anya Pugach	Episode: "Lonelyville"
2009	Law & Order: Criminal Intent	Gallina Ilyanova Ritcher	Episode: "Alpha Dog"
2009	Army Wives	Madeleine Marcon	Episode: "First Response"
2009	Melrose Place	Brunette Girl	Episode: "Pilot"
2009	Medium	Elena Agronov	Episode: "Who's That Girl"
2009	Fringe	Christine Hollis	Episode: "August"
2009	Royal Pains	Valentina Rossi	Episode: "TB or Not TB"
2010	Royal Pains	Valentina Rossi	Episode: "Mano a Mano"
2011	Gossip Girl	Donna	Episodes: "Panic Roommate", "It-Girl Happened One Night", "While You Weren't Sleeping"
2011	White Collar	Shannon	Episode: "Scott Free"
