= Norberto Barba =

American television director (born 1963)

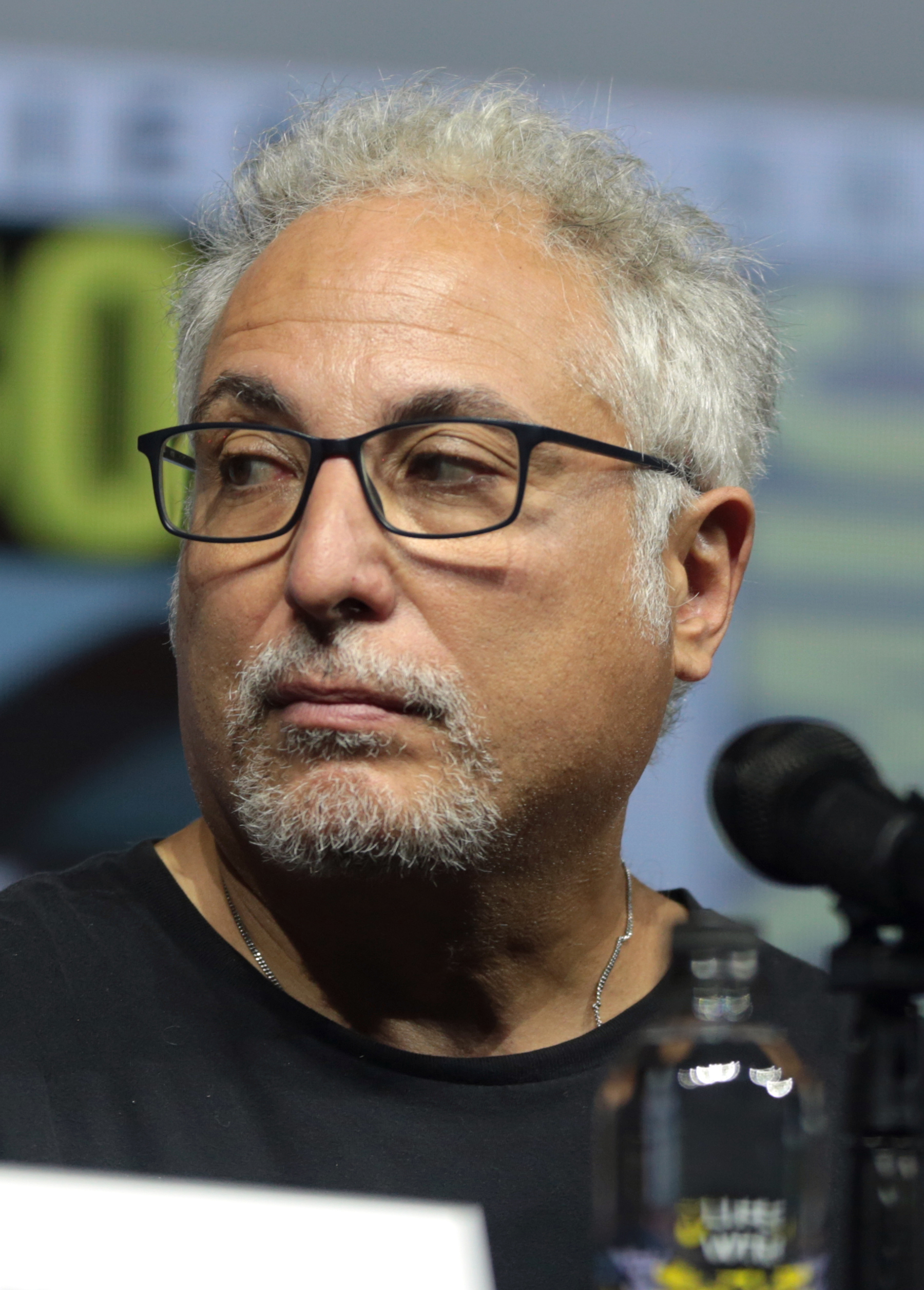
- Barba at the 2018 San Diego Comic-Con
- Born: September 12, 1963 (age 62); The Bronx, New York, U.S.
- Occupations: TV and film director
- Years active: 1992–present
- Awards: ALMA Award (nominations); Outstanding Director of a Television Drama or Comedy for: 2002 - Resurrection Blvd. Episode Diez y Ocho; 2006 - Law & Order: Criminal Intent Episode Tru Love; 2008 - Law & Order: Criminal Intent Episode Depths

Norberto Barba (born September 12, 1963) is an American television and film director. He is known for his work on Grimm and the Law & Order franchise.

== Biographical details ==
A native of the Bronx, New York, Barba studied at Regis High School in New York City. He also spent two years at Columbia University and later went to USC School of Cinematic Arts. After earning his degree, he became a director fellow at the American Film Institute, where he earned his postgraduate degree in film production.

Barba made his directorial debut in 1992 with the short film Chavez Ravine, which tells the story of a father and son struggling to defend their home against city developers planning to build Dodger Stadium in the mid-1950s. In addition, he directed Blue Tiger (1994) and Solo (1996), before specializing as a director/producer for television programs.

His television credits include series such as New York Undercover, Level 9, Resurrection Blvd., American Dreams, CSI: Miami, Numb3rs, CSI: NY, Blade: The Series, Fringe, Grimm, Law & Order: Criminal Intent, Law & Order: Special Victims Unit, Threshold, Kojak and Medical Investigation, as well in Apollo 11: The Movie (1996).

Barba is a three-time ALMA Award nominated. He also served in the U.S. Army Reserves, attending basic training at Ft. Sill, OK in early 1990 and then serving in a Psychological Operations unit of the U.S. Army Special Forces.

He departed his position as executive producer and director on NBC's Grimm after Season Five to pursue other directing opportunities.
