= Law & Order: Criminal Intent season 6 =

Season of American television series

Law & Order: Criminal Intent
- Season 6
- Season 6 U.S. DVD cover
- No. of episodes: 22

Release
- Original network: NBC
- Original release: September 19, 2006 – May 21, 2007

Season chronology
- ← Previous; Season 5 Next → Season 7

The sixth season of Law & Order: Criminal Intent premiered on NBC September 19, 2006, and ended May 21, 2007; this was the last season to air original episodes on NBC.

This season of Law & Order: CI premiered in the NBC Tuesday 9/8c time slot as a lead-in for episodes of Law & Order: Special Victims Unit; NBC had acquired the rights to Sunday Night Football for the 2006–2007 season. For its first six airings, it faced CBS's The Unit and baseball on Fox. In late October, Fox's hit series House moved opposite L&O: CI. It was hoped that the show could maintain second position, beating the then-marginal The Unit, but that did not occur.

The show's ratings suffered a steep drop and it regularly finished fourth in its time slot. By the end of the season, Law & Order: CI saw its lowest ratings ever on NBC, the episodes "Endgame" and "Renewal" being shifted to originally air on Monday nights.

This is the last season the original hard rock theme song was used in the opening sequence before changing to the fast-paced theme song of the now-defunct related series Law & Order: Trial by Jury – coinciding with the show's move to USA Network in Fall 2007.

== Cast and crew changes ==
It was announced that Jamey Sheridan wanted to depart the cast at the end of the fifth season. Sheridan's Captain Deakins retires from the Major Case Squad starting with the episode "On Fire," rather than battle a conspiracy to frame him instigated by former Chief of Detectives Frank Adair (Michael Rispoli), whom Major Case detectives have arrested for killing a female acquaintance and her husband.

Courtney B. Vance who portrayed Assistant District Attorney Ron Carver decided not to renew his contract at the end of the fifth season, which resulted in his character being written out. It was the same with Annabella Sciorra, who portrayed Mike Logan's partner Detective Barek; there were no reasons cited for Sciorra's departure.

Stars Vincent D'Onofrio, Kathryn Erbe, and Chris Noth returned for the sixth season as Eric Bogosian joined the cast as Captain Daniel Ross, Deakins' successor, who is a more by-the-book commanding officer, often getting in conflict with Detectives Goren and Logan. Julianne Nicholson also joined the cast as Detective Megan Wheeler, replacing Carolyn Barek as Logan's partner. Nicholson left the series temporarily to go on maternity leave at the end of the season.

Show runner René Balcer and executive producer Fred Berner left the show at the end of season five, Balcer and Berner returning to the original Law & Order series, which was slowly falling in the ratings. CI was handed off to Warren Leight, a longtime Criminal Intent staffer. Under Leight's leadership, the show acquired a new, more melodramatic tone.

"This is a different CI this season – there will be politics and more at stake emotionally and personally for our detectives," says Warren Leight, "We'll see more character-oriented stories, we want to give characters a larger role going forward and see the effect and sense the toll this job takes on the officers. Detective Goren isn't always going to be the smartest guy in the room anymore."

The mystery aspect of the show was simplified in favor of more personal stories involving the detectives. For example, Goren endured his mother's long battle with cancer, culminating with her death in the episode "Endgame." Also, Logan's anger issues often come and go in episodes like "Maltese Cross," "Flipped," and "Renewal."

The show's look and editing style also changed in an effort to attract viewers of the newer CSI franchise. Norberto Barba replaced Fred Berner as executive producer. The scene cards and sound effect were not used in this season; they were brought back as of the ninth season.

== Cast ==
=== Main cast ===
- Vincent D'Onofrio as Detective Robert Goren – alternating with Chris Noth (Episodes 1, 3, 5, 6, 8, 12, 13, 15, 18, 19 & 21)
- Kathryn Erbe as Detective Alexandra Eames – alternating with Julianne Nicholson (Main credit episodes 1, 3, 5, 6, 8, 12, 13, 15, 18, 19, 21, recurring credit episode 22)
- Chris Noth as Detective Mike Logan – alternating with Vincent D'Onofrio (Episodes 2, 4, 7, 9–11, 14, 16, 17, 20 & 22)
- Julianne Nicholson as Detective Megan Wheeler – alternating with Kathryn Erbe (Episodes 2, 4, 7, 9–11, 14, 16, 17, 20, 22)
- Eric Bogosian as Captain Danny Ross

note: some episodes aired in an order different from "production code" order, resulting in consecutive weeks of Goren/Eames or Logan/Wheeler

=== Recurring cast ===
- Geneva Carr as News Reporter Faith Yancy
- Hudson Cooper as Detective Jefferies
- Traci Godfrey as Detective Agnes Farley
- Tony Goldwyn as Frank Goren
- Leslie Hendrix as Elizabeth Rodgers
- Neal Jones as NYPD Chief of Detectives Bradshaw
- Gary Patent as NYPD Computer Expert Ira Whipple
- Theresa Randle as ADA Patricia Kent
- Bridget Regan as ADA Claudia Shankly
- Ean Sheehy as Joshua Simmons
- Rocco Sisto as NYPD Commissioner Fahey

=== Guest stars ===
Martha Plimpton guest stars in the season premiere episode "Blind Spot" as Jo Gage, the serial killing daughter of Detective Goren's former mentor, Dr. Declan Gage, who is portrayed by John Glover. Plimpton's cousin, Ever Carradine, guest stars in the later episode, "Bombshell."

Anne Dudek portrays a teacher named Danielle McCaskin, who falls madly in love with her student, Keith Tyler (Anton Yelchin), after regrettably having sex with his father in the episode "Tru Love."

In "Siren Call," Brooke Shields portrays Kelly Sloane-Raines, a rich supermodel whose husband is believed to be involved in the murder of a small-town police officer's daughter.

In "Maltese Cross," Chance Kelly plays Charlie Hugo, a firefighter who assaults Logan starting a brawl between the NYPD and NYFD. Nina Siemaszko guest-stars as Claudia Duffy, the wife of a slain firefighter. A link between the murder and another 12-year-old case is made when Logan and Wheeler talk to a Mrs. Hoffman played by Kaitlin Hopkins. Rocco Sisto as Police Commissioner Fahey, and Neal Jones as Chief of Detectives Bradshaw, make their first appearances in this episode.

Rip Torn guest stars as Jules Copeland in "Bedfellows," the snide father of a wealthy and prominent historian, Adlai. Paul Fitzgerald plays Jules' less-favored son Ted, whose wife Lena is played by Carrie Preston.

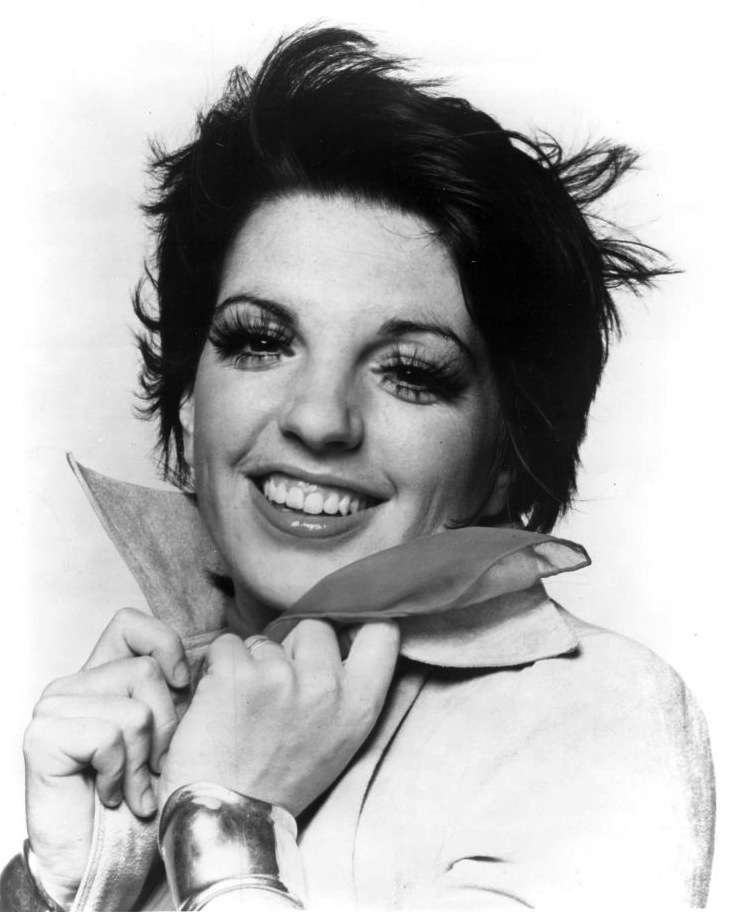
Liza Minnelli, 1973

Liza Minnelli guest stars as Beth Harner, a grieving mother who might get closure as a suspect is found that might have been involved in her daughter's brutal murder on Halloween night in the 1990s. Bill Irwin appears as Beth's neighbor, Nate Royce with Dashiell Eaves as his son Jamie. Matt McGrath plays Simon Fife, the initial suspect, and media personality Faith Yancy is portrayed by Geneva Carr.

Agnes Bruckner plays May, chasing her husband Zach's (Kohl Sudduth) dream of becoming a "Country Crossover" singing star. Both are suspects, along with Griffin Dunne's and Evan Parke's characters, when May's producer is killed.

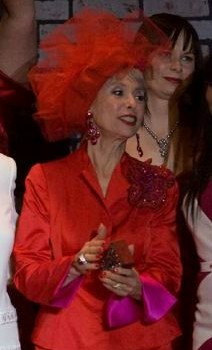
Rita Moreno plays Goren's terminally-ill schizophrenic mother

Fran Drescher and Michael Biehn portray Elaine and Leland Dockerty, a couple whose military daughter disappears over Thanksgiving after she comes home from a tour of duty. Leland Dockerty was the Deputy Commissioner of the NYPD. Rita Moreno also guest stars in "The War at Home" as Detective Robert Goren's mother, Frances, who has fallen ill from dealing with her cancer; she later returns in the Goren/Eames team season finale episode "Endgame," where she succumbs to her cancer shortly after Goren brings up his paternity.

Matt Keeslar guest stars in "Blasters" as TV celebrity Willie "Kirk" Tunis, whose old screen friend is murdered by mobsters.

Michelle Trachtenberg portrays Lisa Willow Tyler in "Weeping Willow," a girl who is kidnapped during the middle of her web show broadcast. Pedro Pascal plays one of the kidnappers, Reggie Luckman, and Wallace Shawn plays a Film Professor. Larry King makes a cameo as himself.

In "World's Fair," two families, Pakistani-American and Italian-American, collide over the murder of Meena Hasni, which is initially ruled a hate crime. Maulik Pancholy plays Dani's brother. Erick Avari plays Kazi, while Meera Simhan plays Safia, their parents, who had betrothed Meena to Tariq Amir (Samrat Chakrabarti). However, Meena was in love with Rudy Ventano (Jason Cerbone). His uncle Joseph is played by Tony Lo Bianco, and his mother Cecilia by Patti D'Arbanville.

In "Privilege," Doris Roberts portrays Virginia Harrington, the matriarch of an aristocratic New York family, who nearly dies from mistreatment by her son Grant (D. W. Moffett). Richard Kind guest-stars as her other son. After Virginia's granddaughter Isabel is murdered, Goren and Eames questions Dylan Mercer (Richard Short), the biological father of Isabel's daughter Zoe, and Terrence Winthrop (Kenneth Tigar), the Harrington's ex-lawyer, among others, to close in on the culprit.

In "Albatross," Donna Murphy and Xander Berkeley guest star as George and Maureen Pagolis, a political couple that has some involvement in the murder of a judge during a reenactment of the Alexander Hamilton/Aaron Burr duel. Mike Colter also guest stars as the Pagolis's driver, Dave Oldren.

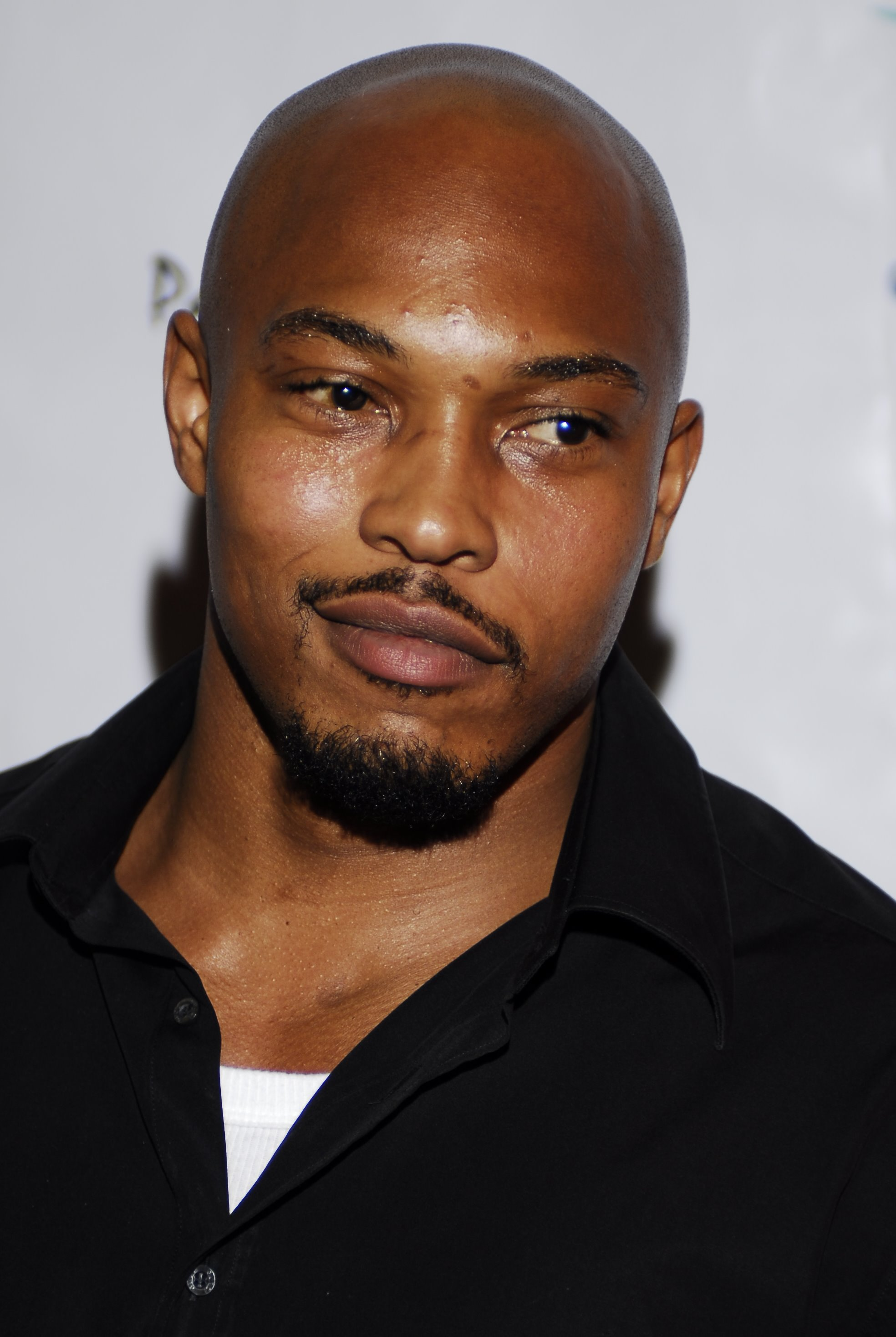
Kirk Jones aka "Sticky Fingaz" plays Det. Harry Williams in "Flipped"

Fab Five Freddy guest stars in the opening of the episode "Flipped" as rapper Fulla-T who is killed on the streets. Kirk "Sticky Fingaz" Jones portrays gang-unit Detective Harry Williams, who quickly turns from lead investigator to lead suspect in Fulla-T's murder. Other suspects include Andre Royo as Luther Pinkston and Bokeem Woodbine as Gordon "G-Man" Thomas. Aunjanue Ellis portrays Carmen Rivera, the girlfriend of Fulla-T who refuses to "snitch" to the police on who killed him.

In "Brother's Keeper," Tom Arnold guest stars as Rev. Calvin Riggins who debates an evolutionist named Dr. James Corliss (Reg Rogers), which leads to the death of Riggins' wife Marjorie (Christine Lindsay-Abaire). Michael Nouri also appears as church Elder Roberts. Tony Goldwyn plays Detective Goren's homeless brother Frank. Goldwyn returns in the season finale "Endgame" where their mother Frances is still suffering from cancer.

In "30," Lee Tergesen is Josh Lemle, a reporter poisoned with polonium-210, prompting ESU Capt. Murtaugh (Chris Bauer) to secure any sites Lemle visited, including a restaurant where the poisoning took place. Kristen Schaal plays the waitress Alana Binder, who helps Goren and Wheeler find the perpetrator. However, Miriam Shor plays the real target, Rebecca Slater. Ned Eisenberg plays Artie Ableson, Chair of the US-Israel Friendship PAC, who provides insight into the motive.

In "Players," John Dossett portrays Judge Nicholas Fenner Sr., whose son Jacob is murdered after the judge imprisons a rapper that Jacob idolized. Jacob's friend are questioned, including Thomas M. Grady Jr. (Christian Hoff), the son of prosecutor Riordan Grady (Michael Stahl-David), and grandson of convicted felon Thomas M. Grady Sr. (Harris Yulin).

Bill O'Brien guest stars in "Silencer" as Det. Peter Lyons who Goren and Eames rely on to translate ASL in a community of deaf theater actors when Dr. Jack Mallory is murdered, and Dean Price (Deanne Bray) is shot. Deaf suspects include Alexandria Wailes as Malia Gallo and Garrett Zuercher as Tommy Kellerman, and hearing suspects include Timothy Carhart as Dr. Strauss, and Raynor Scheine as Antonio, a peddler of prescription pads and drugs.

Tate Donovan guest stars in "Rocket Man" as Commander Luke Nelson and Amy Ryan plays his wife, Edie. Charissa Chamorro as Sandy Del Gado, and Kelly Sullivan as Lieutenant Jessica Hart, are fellow astronauts, of which the latter is murdered. Michael Cumpsty also appears as Mark Schaeffer, Director of Public Communications for the National Space Agency.

Kristy Swanson portrays Lorelai Mailer, a "Bombshell" former pinup model in Men's Privilege owned by playboy, George Merritt (Peter Bogdanovich). David Cross plays her manager, Ronnie Chase, and Ever Carradine her sister Jolene. Lorelai is an heiress to her late husband's fortune, which is disputed by James Edward Holland's previous children, Bessie and Clara, portrayed by Kathleen Chalfant and Jill Larson, respectively.

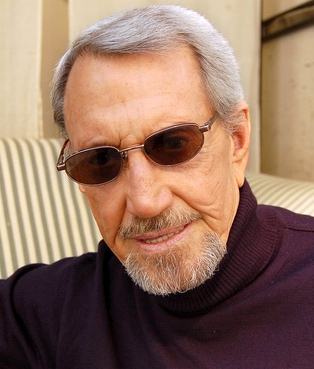
Roy Scheider, 2007

Roy Scheider guest stars as serial killer Mark Ford Brady in "Endgame;" Goren becomes irritable as he deals with Brady's near-end confessions and his mother's (Rita Moreno) cancer, but it turns out the two are connected. Mark Linn-Baker returns briefly as Wally Stevens, as an unwitting conduit between Goren and Brady, who is in the same penitentiary.

In the season finale "Renewal," Kelli Williams guest stars as Logan's neighbor and possible girlfriend, Holly Lauren. But when she turns up dead, it drives Logan mad to the point where he stops focusing on the case at hand—a police recruit's murder—and focuses instead on Lauren's death, which may have possibly been a suicide.

Brooke Tansley guest stars as Belle Duffy, a girl who follows in Nicole Wallace's (Olivia d'Abo, who doesn't appear in the episode) footsteps. Kathryn Erbe (Detective Alex Eames) guest stars in the episode to help Detective Wheeler close the police recruit's murder case.

== Episodes ==
No. overall	No. in season	Title	Directed by	Written by	Original release date	Prod. code	U.S. viewers (millions)
112	1	"Blind Spot"	Norberto Barba	S : Warren Leight; S/T : Charlie Rubin	September 19, 2006	06001	11.57
Detectives Goren and Eames investigate the death of a former ambassador's daughter, who is found brutally murdered in her uptown home. When another woman is similarly murdered, Goren recalls a serial murder case from the past. Jo Gage, (Martha Plimpton), the daughter of Goren's reclusive mentor, Declan Gage (John Glover), initially helps Goren with the investigation at the precinct. Much to the new Captain Daniel Ross's displeasure, her obsessive father Declan arrives with the theory the killer is the same one that wrecked his career. When the killer kidnaps Eames, Goren struggles to keep in control and slowly comes to the realization that Gages' neglected daughter, Jo, is the killer, desperately seeking the attention of her father.: Eric Bogosian joins the cast as Captain Daniel Ross replacing Captain James Deakins (Jamey Sheridan).
113	2	"Tru Love"	Norberto Barba	S : Warren Leight; S/T : Diana Son	September 26, 2006	06004	10.61
Detective Logan and new partner Megan Wheeler (Julianne Nicholson) investigate the case of Dr. Grant Tyler (Nick Gregory) a womanizing plastic surgeon, who died as a result of a motorcycle accident. The apparent accident takes a turn when the motorcycle is found sabotaged, but further evidence leads the team to realize the victim slept with his son's high-school teacher Danielle McCaskin (Anne Dudek). At first, the detectives suspect the jealous and violent husband Jack (Jonathan LaPaglia), but they soon become suspicious of the victim's son Keith (Anton Yelchin) who is having an affair with Danielle and they planned to elope together. They discover that the Keith conspired to kill his father after he forced Danielle into having sex with him.: Julianne Nicholson joins the cast Logan's new partner Detective Megan Wheeler replacing Detective Carolyn Barek (Annabella Sciorra).
114	3	"Siren Call"	Frank Prinzi	S : Warren Leight; S/T : Julie Martin	October 3, 2006	06005	12.18
Detectives Goren and Eames investigate the brutal murder of a teenage girl from The Hamptons, Ashley Gardella (Samantha Hahn), who is found dead in her car after a night of partying in Queens. Early investigation leads them to Ashley's married boss, Jason Raines (Joel Gretsch), husband of supermodel Kelly Sloane-Raines (Brooke Shields), who had maintained an extramarital affair with Ashley but he is not the killer. Their attention then turns to victim's step-father, a local police officer Ray Wiznesky (David Warshofsky), who has had to deal with his rebellious step-daughter while trying to care for his youngest child Emily (Mackenzie Jo Pardi), and his wife Joyce (Signy Coleman) who is dying from cancer. Eventually it is revealed that Ray Wiznesky murdered Ashley because of the stress he believed her wild antics was causing her dying mother. When confronted, Wiznesky decides to kill Goren and then himself, although Goren manages to disarm him. However, as he's taken into custody, he grabs an officer's gun and kills himself.
115	4	"Maltese Cross"	Jim McKay	Jacquelyn Reingold	October 10, 2006	06006	11.47
Detectives Logan and Wheeler investigate when a fireman Ian Duffy (Jason Pendergraft) is stabbed 22 times and collapses after managing to drive himself to the fire station. The ensuing investigation and Logan's questioning launches them into a brawl with the firefighters led by Charlie Hugo (Chance Kelly), resulting in a hearing before the Commissioner for Logan and Wheeler. The storyline arcs back to the fight as Logan and Wheeler retell their story to the Commissioner, giving perspective to the fight and underlying issues between the NYPD and the FDNY. The brawl proves to be a red herring when the detectives discover that Duffy was gay and it appears the crime was perpetrated by a possible repeat killer, Brendan Keele (Geoffrey Nauffts), who is also suspected of an identical murder twelve years earlier. Logan enlists the help of fireman Hugo into provoking Keele into proclaiming his relationship with Duffy and his murder.
116	5	"Bedfellows"	Frank Prinzi	S : Julie Martin & Warren Leight; S/T : Stephanie Sengupta	October 17, 2006	06003	10.99
Detectives Goren and Eames investigate a 911 call made by the young son of a wealthy and prominent historian, Dr. Adlai Copeland (Will Kempe) stating that his parents will not wake up. The detectives arrive and find Adlai poisoned, with his wife Charlene (Missy Crider) still clinging to his corpse. He was poisoned with a pesticide leading Goren and Eames to look at the gardener with whom Charlene had been cheating but he is cleared. Suspicion then falls turns to Charlene who suffers a mental breakdown and then on Adlai's brother Ted (Paul Fitzgerald) who is virtually bankrupt following a series of failed investments and who has been sidelined by the family patriarch Jules Copeland (Rip Torn). When Ted is also found dead, the detectives turn their attention to the two men's wives, Charlene and Ted's wife Lena (Carrie Preston) both of whom had multiple reasons to want the brothers dead, although the calculating Lena is soon identified as the perpetrator of both murders.
117	6	"Masquerade"	Christine Moore	S : Warren Leight; S/T : Gina Gionfriddo	October 31, 2006	06007	8.47
Detectives Goren and Eames travel to Vietnam to bring back a suspect, Simon Fife (Matt McGrath), for trial in to New York for the murder of a child beauty queen, Amberleigh Harner (Kayla Vanderbilt), fourteen years earlier. Fife has confessed to the long-unsolved murder, however Goren is suspicious of Fife's confession, even though it mentions facts only known to the police and the child's immediate family. The investigation reveals that the dead child's mother Beth (Liza Minnelli) and Jamie Royce (Dashiell Eaves), son of her next-door-neighbor Nate Royce (Bill Irwin) (who has been making money off the murder with several books), both have possible motives for the murder. It is also revealed that the original investigation was botched by a rookie investigator and a new ADA Claudia Shankly (Bridget Regan) is pushing for a quick resolution to the cold case. Goren and Eames eventually uncover that, although Jamie rendered Amberleigh unconscious, it was his father Nate who killed her. Nate fed information to Fife, hoping that his conviction would prevent the truth about the murder from being revealed.: Loosely based on the JonBenét Ramsey unsolved murder case made famous by media coverage.
118	7	"Country Crossover"	Bill L. Norton	S : Warren Leight; S/T : Gina Gionfriddo	November 7, 2006	06002	7.39
Detectives Logan and Wheeler investigate when a prominent music producer Curtis Gold (Luther Creek), dies outside his recording studio, apparently killed by a drunk driver, however he died from an earlier beating because he had Gaucher's disease. As the investigation continues, the list of suspects include an eccentric nightclub bouncer, Goro (Evan Parke) and disreputable nightclub owner Sheamus Flaherty (Griffin Dunne) as well as an ambitious young singer, May Daltrie (Agnes Bruckner) who may have been sleeping with Gold, and her jealous husband Zach (Kohl Sudduth). Finally, Logan and Wheeler extract a confession from May that she manipulate Zach into killing Gold who had pressured her into having sex with him to advance her career.
119	8	"The War at Home"	Darnell Martin	S : Julie Martin & Warren Leight; S/T : Diana Son	November 14, 2006	06009	9.14
Detectives Goren and Eames are called to investigate when Amanda Dockerty (Betty Gilpin) the daughter of Deputy Commissioner Leland Dockerty (Michael Biehn) of the NYPD and his wife Elaine (Fran Drescher) goes missing on a Thanksgiving holiday. When Amanda, a soldier and Iraq war veteran, is discovered slain and stuffed into an oil drum, her murder appears to be related to her war service. Meanwhile, Goren struggles with a personal crisis when his ailing mother, Frances (Rita Moreno) (who we see for the first time in the series), is in a hospital being treated for cancer and paranoid behavior. Torn between caring for his mother and being pressured to solve the case, Goren loses his composure and has a career-threatening meltdown in front of Detective Eames and Captain Ross. Nevertheless, Goren uses his interrogation skills to extract a confession from Wesley Burkhartz (Shane McRae) an officer from her outfit in Iraq who killed her on the suspicion that she would expose the murder of Iraqis in revenge for an ambush on American troops.
120	9	"Blasters"	Constantine Makris	S : Warren Leight; S/T : Charlie Rubin	November 21, 2006	06008	9.26
When unknown bodies are about to be buried in a pauper's grave in Potter's Field, Logan and Wheeler stop the burial after one is identified as the former sitcom teen star Alvin "Skater" Stevens (Noah Weisberg). Their investigation soon leads them Skater's scam of selling bootleg DVDs, encroaching on an operation controlled exclusively by the Albanian mob. When Skater's former co-star, Willie "Kirk" Tunis (Matt Keeslar), is also threatened and almost killed by Albanian Ditmir Minojilj (Stivi Paskoski), Logan and Wheeler convince Tunis to cast off his child star reputation and identify Minojilj in a police lineup.
121	10	"Weeping Willow"	Tom DiCillo	S : Warren Leight; S/T : Stephanie Sengupta	November 28, 2006	06010	9.76
After popular on-line vlogger Lisa "Willow" Tyler (Michelle Trachtenberg) and her boyfriend Holden Foster (Michael Goduti) are kidnapped during a live broadcast, Logan and Wheeler investigate the crime that they doubt may have ever occurred. As they attempt to track down the real identities of Willow and her boyfriend, the kidnappers up the ante by asking for an online ransom for the couple, demanding fans donate to a website to save the duo. The detectives identify the kidnappers, Todd (Trevor Oswalt) and Reggie (Pedro Pascal), as part-time actors however the investigation takes a turn after Reggie is shot dead. Logan and Wheeler uncover that the entire kidnapping was scripted by Holden, and Reggie was accidentally killed by a "blank" bullet. Meanwhile, "Willow" uses the ransom to finance a movie deal about the kidnapping with her in the leading role.: Inspired by the lonelygirl15 YouTube vblogs originally believed to be from a 15-year-old, but eventually uncovered as a professionally filmed hoax.
122	11	"World's Fair"	Steve Shill	S : Julie Martin & Warren Leight; S/T : Jacquelyn Reingold	January 2, 2007	06012	13.38
Detectives Logan and Wheeler investigate the murder of Meena Hasni (Mahira Kakkar ) a young Pakistani-American college student, found slain in front of the Unisphere. During the investigation, Logan and Wheeler learn she had a passionate, loving relationship with her Italian-American boyfriend Rudy Ventano (Jason Cerbone) and that she was pregnant with their child and wanted to marry him. When Rudy visits Meena's family, a fight breaks out and he is shot dead by Meena's father Kazi Hasni (Erick Avari), who also confesses to Meena's murder. However, the detectives conclude, and later prove, that it was Meena's brother Dani Hasni (Maulik Pancholy), who killed her for dishonoring their family.
123	12	"Privilege"	Jean de Segonzac	Warren Leight, Julie Martin & Siobhan Byrne O'Connor	January 9, 2007	06013	11.78
Detectives Goren and Eames investigate when a reporter, Isabel Harrington (Margaret Laney), and her yoga instructor Willem Vanderhoeven (John Walton) are found brutally murdered in her apartment. Isabel is the granddaughter of a prominent wealthy socialite bedridden with illness, Virginia Harrington (Doris Roberts), and former member of an aristocratic family from New York. The detectives find that the matriarch's illness has been induced by her philandering son Grant (D.W. Moffett) and his second wife Cheryl (Kay Story) who are slowly plundering the estate. As they dig deeper, the detectives discover that Isabel was about to expose her father Grant's financial dealings and her mother's suspicious death eighteen year earlier. Eventually, the detectives charge Grant's brother Ernest Foley (Richard Kind) for the murders which he committed in the mistaken belief that he was protecting the family name.: Inspired by the Brooke Astor elder abuse controversy.
124	13	"Albatross"	Frank Prinzi	S : Warren Leight; S/T : Marsha Norman	February 6, 2007	06011	8.81
Detectives Goren and Eames investigate the death of a respected judge Thomas Layton (Daren Kelly) killed during a historical reenactment of the Burr–Hamilton duel which is also attended by Captain Ross. During the investigation, Goren and Eames turn their suspicion to the judge's dueling partner, George Pagolis (Xander Berkeley) who exchanged coats with the judge just before the duel. He is revealed as a corrupt womanizer who is married to the respected Maureen Pagolis (Donna Murphy), a candidate for the next New York mayoral election. The detectives suspect that he was the actual target of the hit from a long range sniper. Further investigation reveals that the Perogolis driver, Dave Oldren (Mike Colter) organized the hit to rid Maureen of her albatross of a husband, George.
125	14	"Flipped"	Jim McKay	S : Warren Leight; S/T : Charles Kipps	February 13, 2007	06014	8.50
Detectives Logan and Wheeler investigate the murder of hip-hop artist, Terrence "Fulla T" Smith (Fab 5 Freddy), shot to death while leaving a radio station. During the investigation, the detectives learn the victim was encouraging his fans to report crimes and not turn a blind eye. They later interview one witness identified at the scene, who reveals he is an undercover detective, Harry Williams (Sticky Fingaz) who specializes in crimes within the rap world. Logan and Wheeler decide to team up with Williams, but when one witness, Bobby Boyd (Omar Evans) talks to them he turns up dead and another, Carmen Rivera (Aunjanue Ellis), disappears. After they find Rivera, she reveals Gordon "G-Man" Thomas (Bokeem Woodbine) as Fulla T's killer because he accused Thomas of being a woman beater. Due to lack of evidence, the detectives are forced to offer a Manslaughter plea to Thomas, but while in custody, Williams murders Thomas to protect Rivera from retribution.
126	15	"Brother's Keeper"	Ken Girotti	S : Warren Leight; S/T : Marsha Norman	February 20, 2007	06015	9.39
Detectives Goren and Eames investigate the death of Marjorie Riggins (Christine Lindsay-Abaire), wife of televangelist Rev. Calvin Riggins (Tom Arnold) following his fiery televised debate with evolutionist Dr. James Corliss (Reg Rogers). Initially, the murder appears to be connected to a possible blackmail attempt over Riggins' sexual intercessions with his masseur Diego (Brian Letscher), but this is ruled out. Eventually Corliss is identified as the murderer who accidentally killed Marjorie. Corliss could not understand why she chose to marry Riggins instead of him and why she told Riggins about his autistic brother Jimmy (Todd Buonopane). Meanwhile, Goren's attention to the case is hampered by his anxiety over his ailing mother and her concern for Frank, Goren's destitute and troubled brother.
127	16	"30"	Andrei Belgrader & Jean de Segonzac	S : Warren Leight; S/T : Charlie Rubin	February 27, 2007	06016	9.26
Detectives Logan and Wheeler investigate when Josh Lemle (Lee Tergesen), a reporter friend who had backed Logan after he had gotten himself exiled years earlier, comes to Major Case to report his own murder as he is dying from polonium-210 poisoning. Both Hazmat and the FBI get involved as the search turns city-wide, with both the mayor and Homeland Security wanting answers. Lemle is reluctant to reveal the whole story but it turns out the true target was his long-time friend and sometimes lover, Rebecca Slater (Miriam Shor) who writing a story about the shooting of a US activist in the Middle East that no-one wants to be told.: Inspired by the Alexander Litvinenko poisoning and death of Rachel Corrie.
128	17	"Players"	Tom DiCillo	S : Warren Leight; S/T : Peter Blauner	March 27, 2007	06018	8.85
Detectives Logan and Wheeler investigate the murder of Jacob Fenner (Brandon Thane Wilson, son of Judge Nicholas Fenner (John Dossett), who is found shot to death shortly after rap artist Calvin "Apokalypto" Liscomb (Samuel Smith) is sentenced to prison by the judge. After eliminating any connection to the musician's entourage, the detectives discover that Fenner was accidentally shot by an off duty court officer, Hector D'Angelo (Joe Maruzzo), while Fenner and his friends were on a wild night out. The detectives begin investigating victim's friends and focus on Riordan Grady (Michael Stahl-David), son of the judge's best friend and prosecutor, Thomas Grady Jr. (Christian Hoff), and grandson of convicted criminal Thomas Grady Sr. (Harris Yulin). Eventually the detectives establish that Riordan was responsible for dumping Fenner even though he was still alive after being shot. Meanwhile, Wheeler learns that her long-lost father could still be alive, and that he may have been involved in some shady business practices.
129	18	"Silencer"	Dean White	S : Warren Leight; S/T : Marygrace O'Shea	April 3, 2007	06017	7.14
Detectives Goren and Eames investigate the murder of the fiancée of ADA Claudia Shankly (Bridget Regan), the esteemed ear surgeon Dr. Jack Mallory (Jack MacGruder), who is found slain in his office. Antonio (Raynor Scheine), a peddler of prescription pads and drugs leads them to another ear doctor, Dr. Strauss (Timothy Carhart), but it is dead end. The detectives enlist the aid of Det. Peter Lyon (Bill O'Brien) to help them translate ASL members of the activist deaf community which include the playwright Larry Forseca (Darren Frazier), his leading actress, Malia Gallo (Alexandria Wailes), and her boyfriend Tommy Kellerman (Garrett Zuercher). After some difficulty in soliciting information, Goren and Eames eventually charge Kellerman with the murder, committed because he feared that if Mallory gave Malia a cochlear implant and recovered her hearing, she would leave him.
130	19	"Rocket Man"	Michael Smith	S : Julie Martin & Warren Leight; S/T : Siobhan Byrne O'Connor	May 1, 2007	06019	7.36
Detectives Goren and Eames investigate the death of a female astronaut Jessica Hart (Kelly Sullivan) who is found murdered in her hotel room on the morning of a press conference to promote an upcoming shuttle launch. The investigation leads the detectives to a jealous male colleague, Major Craig Hurley (Peter Bradbury), the flight trainer Sandy Delgado (Charissa Chamorro) and shuttle commander Luke Nelson (Tate Donovan). When an evidence trail points to a Nelson having affairs with both Jessica and Sandy, they begin to suspect Nelson's wife Edie (Amy Ryan ) who had both the motive and the capacity to cause the downfall of the competitors for her husband's attention and affection.
131	20	"Bombshell"	Darnell Martin	S : Julie Martin & Warren Leight; T : Brant Englestein	May 8, 2007	06020	6.94
Detectives Logan and Wheeler are called in to investigate the combined methadone/anti-depressant overdose death of Justin Holland (Michael Ellison), the adult son of former pinup model Lorelai Mailer (Kristy Swanson) and her billionaire James Edward Holland. Lorelai has just given birth to a daughter but she soon also dies of a lethal methadone drug cocktail. The detectives are led to suspect Lorelai's lover/manager, Ronnie Chase (David Cross) as they look into who will benefit most from the Holland estate, including Holland's previous children, Bessie (Kathleen Chalfant) and Clara (Jill Larson). Ultimately Chase admits to killing Justin and Lorelai's unassuming sister, Jolene (Ever Carradine), admits to killing Lorelai because she believed that she was the only one who could best care for the newborn child, Ava.: Inspired by the deaths of Anna Nicole Smith and her son Daniel Wayne Smith.
132	21	"Endgame"	Jean de Segonzac	T : Julie Martin; S/T : Kate Rorick & Warren Leight	May 14, 2007	06021	7.20
Long time death row prisoner Mark Ford Brady's (Roy Scheider) time is due in fifteen days so he asks fellow inmate, Wally Stevens (Mark Linn-Baker) (Note: Season 2, Episode 14, "Probability".), to approach Detective Goren in an attempt for a stay of execution. He provides the location of a hidden scrapbook which contains many more photos of women than his known victims. Goren and Eames identify some of the women as other victims, but some are still alive. A second scrapbook contains a possible photo of Goren's mother, Frances (Rita Moreno), and she confirms she spend time with Brady nine months before Goren was born while his father was away. The revelation leaves Goren in shock as his mother dies in the hospice. Meanwhile, Brady is executed leaving Goren with unanswered questions about his parentage.
133	22	"Renewal"	Norberto Barba	S : Warren Leight; S/T : Jacquelyn Reingold	May 21, 2007	06022	8.85
A police recruit, Kenny Li (Telly Leung), is named a hero after foiling a bodega robbery but is found murdered and soon afterward and his girlfriend Belle Duffy (Brooke Tansley) goes missing. Meanwhile, Detective Logan goes on a date with a charming woman, Holly Lauren (Kelli Williams) he met from his building. However, Holly does not appear for the second date and is found dead nearby after falling from the roof and Logan suspects foul play. Detective Wheeler is called abroad to oversee a past case and Detective Eames (Kathryn Erbe) steps in to help out. Logan involves himself in both cases, and with Eames he finds that Belle Duffy is really Patty Trebay, a serial killer targeting lonely and vulnerable young men. He also discovers that Holly's real identity is Kathleen Shaw who was trying to escape her abusive husband Julian (Alec Von Bargen), but sadly she suicided after he attacked and raped her in her apartment.

Preceded by Season Five	List of Law & Order: Criminal Intent episodes	Succeeded by Season Seven
