= Law & Order: Criminal Intent season 4 =

Season of American television series

Law & Order: Criminal Intent
- Season 4
- Season 4 U.S. DVD cover
- No. of episodes: 23

Release
- Original network: NBC
- Original release: September 26, 2004 – May 25, 2005

Season chronology
- ← Previous; Season 3 Next → Season 5

The fourth season of Law & Order: Criminal Intent premiered on NBC on September 26, 2004, and ended May 25, 2005. The series remained in its time slot of Sundays at 9 PM/8c, but the season finale episode "False-Hearted Judges" aired on Wednesday, May 25, 2005, at 10 PM ET/9 CT.

Stars Vincent D'Onofrio, Kathryn Erbe, Jamey Sheridan, and Courtney B. Vance returned for the fourth season. Around mid-season, star Vincent D'Onofrio fainted twice from exhaustion, once on set and again at his home. Writers René Balcer and Elizabeth Benjamin won an Edgar Award in the category Best Episode in a Television Series Teleplay, for the episode "Want". Almost three months before the fourth season finale, it was announced Chris Noth would join the show in the fifth season, alternating episodes with D'Onofrio, due to his health issues at the time.

== Production ==
NBC renewed Law & Order: Criminal Intent for a fourth season on May 12, 2004. On Sundays during the 2003–2004 broadcast network TV season, Law & Order: CI was undefeated in its third season against regular competition in 18–49 and was the only NBC regular series to win that time slot in the last eight years.

In a broadcast network first, Law & Order: Criminal Intent viewers chose the fate of Detective Robert Goren's nemesis, Nicole Wallace (Olivia d'Abo): whether she lives or dies at the end of the episode "Great Barrier" (aired originally on October 17, 2004). Two versions of the episode were shot before the voting began on October 6 and ended October 20, 2004. The East Coast viewers saw Wallace live; the West Coast viewers saw her die. More than 116,000 viewers cast a vote online. "We are very gratified by the response," said showrunner-executive producer René Balcer, "We've always seen this as a gift to our fans, to thank them for their continuing dedication to the series. Live or die, we'll abide by their decision." The choice of Wallace living became the outcome, but Wallace is believed to be killed in the seventh season by Detective Goren's mentor, Dr. Declan Gage (John Glover). But having fooled Declan Gage and faked her own death, Wallace reappeared in 2013 in Paris in the "Catacombs" episode of the series Jo featuring Jean Reno and Jill Hennessy and created by René Balcer.

Previous original Law & Order actor Chris Noth guest-stars in the episode "Stress Position" as his character Detective Mike Logan before returning to join the cast for the fifth season.

== Cast ==
=== Main cast ===
- Vincent D'Onofrio as Detective Robert Goren
- Kathryn Erbe as Detective Alexandra Eames
- Jamey Sheridan as Captain James Deakins
- Courtney B. Vance as ADA Ron Carver

=== Recurring cast ===
- Leslie Hendrix as Chief Medical Examiner Elizabeth Rodgers

=== Notable guest stars ===
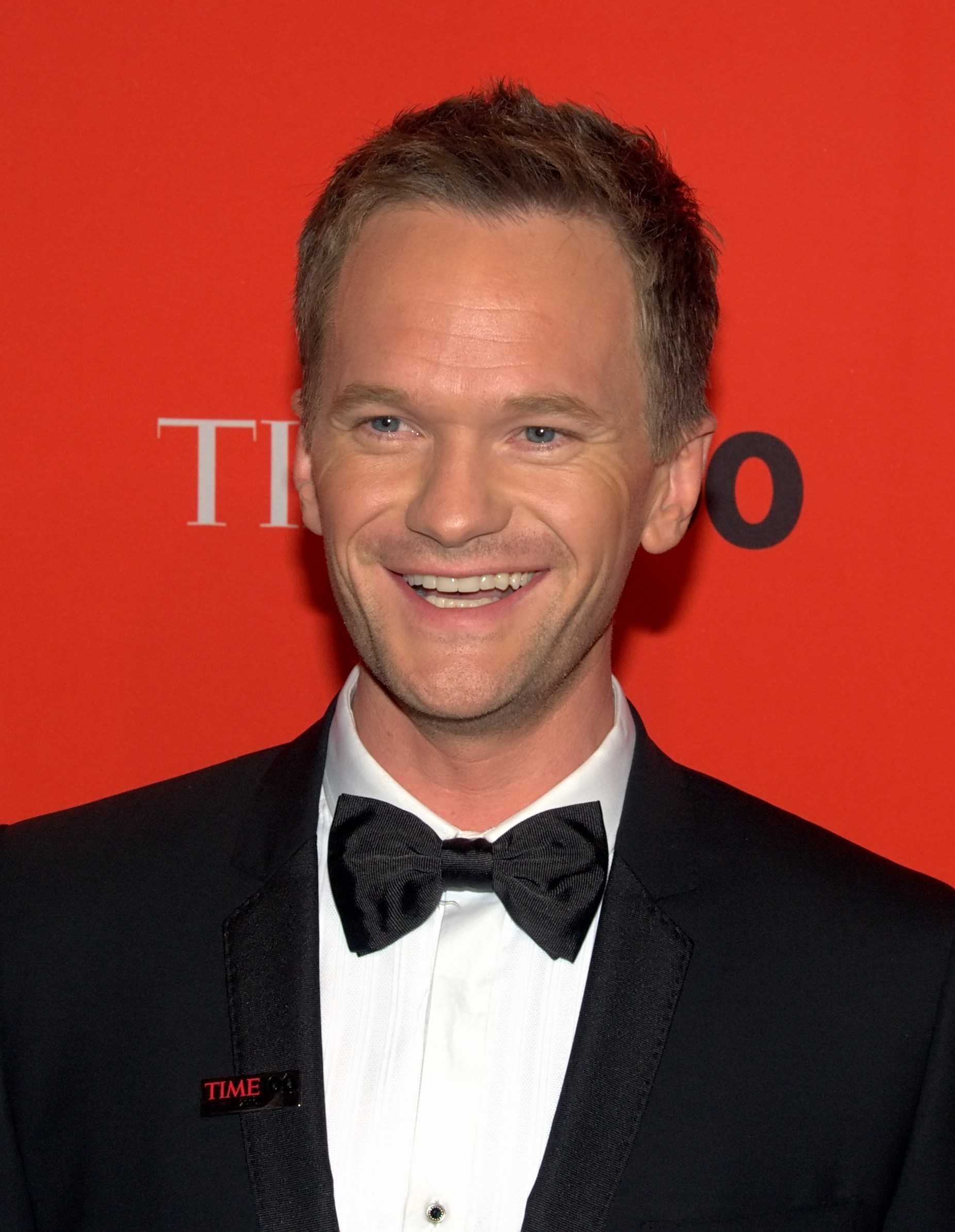
Neil Patrick Harris plays John Tagman (based on Jeffrey Dahmer) in award-winning episode "Want"

- David Andrews as Lloyd Wilkes
- Robert Carradine as David Blake/Roger Withers
- Olivia d'Abo as Nicole Wallace
- Wayne Duvall as Unit Counselor Kurt Plumm
- Darrell Hammond as Leonard Timmons
- Neil Patrick Harris as John Tagman
- Mara Hobel as April Callaway
- Elizabeth Keifer as Marie Adair
- Melissa Leo as Maureen Curtis
- Jack Metzger as Billy Whitlock
- Chris Noth as Detective Mike Logan
- Tatum O'Neal as Kelly Garnett
- Bronson Pinchot as Dr. Gregory Ross
- Carrie Preston as Doreen Whitlock
- Michael Rispoli as Former Chief of Detectives Frank Adair
- Sam Robards as Paul Whitlock
- Matt Servitto as Jim Radcliff
- Francie Swift as Nelda Carlson
- Callie Thorne as Sheila Bradley
- Frank Whaley as Mitch Godel

== Episodes ==
No. overall	No. in season	Title	Directed by	Written by	Original release date	Prod. code	U.S. viewers (millions)
67	1	"Semi-Detached"	Frank Prinzi	S : René Balcer; S/T : Gerry Conway	September 26, 2004	E5404	12.67
Shock jock Ray Garnett (Fisher Stevens) goes missing and is found dead after an apparent suicide. As Goren and Eames investigate, his housekeeper who supplied pain killers to which he was addicted is found murdered. Their investigation leads them to a prescribing nurse at a detox clinic, Nelda Carlson (Francie Swift) who is obsessed with her ex-husband, Barry (Brian Haley), who listened to Garnett's program daily. Goren plays on her emotional codependency to illicit a confession to the two deaths.
68	2	"The Posthumous Collection"	Jean de Segonzac	S : René Balcer; S/T : Marlane Meyer	October 3, 2004	E5425	11.00
Famous photographer, Gerhardt Heltman (Sam Tsoutsouvas), is found dead in a staged car crash. While investigating his background, Goren and Eames find secret photographs of dead women in staged scenarios similar to the covers of pulp detective novels. Similar sketches found in Heltman's belongings lead the detectives to a sketch artist, Spencer Farnell (Glenn Fitzgerald) who is seeking revenge on the women he believed ruined his life. Farnell murdered Heltman after he tried to end the macabre collaboration.
69	3	"Want"	Frank Prinzi	S : René Balcer; S/T : Elizabeth Benjamin	October 10, 2004	E5407	12.81
John Tagman (Neil Patrick Harris) is a lonely, quiet, unassuming guy who kidnaps and attempts to lobotomize two young women, one of whom dies and the other suffers permanent brain damage. Goren and Eames, track him down but have difficulty finding the evidence to convict him. A.D.A. Ron Carver and Captain James Deakins seek the death penalty however Goren surprisingly opposes them, protesting that Tagman did not have the intent to kill, but to create a submissive companion. In the police interview room, Goren successfully elicits a confession from Tagman which results in a life sentence, although he is later beaten to death in prison.
70	4	"Great Barrier"	Frank Prinzi	S : René Balcer; S/T : Diana Son	October 17, 2004	E5402	11.92
When Goren and Eames search for a jewel thief, Ella Miyazaki (Grace Hsu), who murdered her accomplice, they discover that the clever larcenies are the brainchild of her lover, Nicole Wallace (Olivia d'Abo), Goren's reappearing nemesis. As the detectives delve into the relationship between the two women, they uncover an attempt to cause the death of Wallace's ex-husband Richard Joseph Paul (Gavin Haynes), when Nicole perceived him as a threat to revealing her past. The detectives uncover evidence that Nicole gave birth to a daughter in Australia whom she murdered at the age of three on an island on the Great Barrier Reef. They convince Miyazaki to assist them to trap Nicole, but Nicole murders her and escapes.
71	5	"Eosphoros"	Alex Zakrzewski	S : René Balcer; T : Stephanie Sengupta	October 24, 2004	E5401	12.40
The kidnapping of a prominent atheist, Eleanor Callaway (Rita Gardner), leads to her death. The investigation into her captors leads to suspicion of her two sons, one an atheist and the other deeply religious. However, Goren and Eames discover a link between Eleanor's physical therapist, Mitch Godel (Frank Whaley), and her granddaughter April (Mara Hobel) who was also kidnapped at the same time but escaped. Their investigation leads them to believe that Eleanor paid Mitch to stage the kidnapping for the publicity, but he got greedy and wanted all the funds from her foundation while exploiting April's need for affection in the process.
72	6	"In the Dark"	Alex Chapple	S : René Balcer; S/T : Jim Sterling	October 31, 2004	E5403	11.51
The Major Case Squad begins an investigation into the murder of social worker Vicki Hale (Amelia Campbell) whose corpse is sold to a medical wholesaler who then resells human body parts to research institutions. It leads Goren and Eames to the deaths of several homeless men and a series of frauds relating to the sale of auto parts. This takes them to an elderly woman Rose Cahill (Rutanya Alda) in the early stages of dementia who believes her stillborn daughter, Jenny, is still alive and the mechanic Butch Perkins (Geoffrey Lewis) who loves and cares for her. Butch is charged with the murders which he committed to raise money for "Jenny".
73	7	"Magnificat"	Frank Prinzi	S : René Balcer; S/T : Diana Son	November 7, 2004	E5414	11.53
A car bomb kills three young boys, leaving their mother, Doreen Whitlock (Carrie Preston) the eldest son Adam (Sebastian Vignone), badly injured. Suspicion focuses on their father, Paul Whitlock (Sam Robards) a man using coercive control of his family and his wife who has been suffering from depression and low self esteem for years. Doreen eventually admits to planting the bomb but Goren is outraged that her husband accepts no responsibility for his role in her actions. Goren receives some solace in assisting Doreen's mother, Leanne Colson (Pamela Burrell), take custody of the surviving son Adam.
74	8	"Silver Lining"	Kevin Dowling	S : René Balcer; S/T : Marlane Meyer	November 14, 2004	E5409	15.16
Antique appraiser, Rebekah Todman (Pamela Gray), is murdered after assessing a collection of colonial silverware of questionable provenance owned by Victor Burke (Bruce Norris) which is subsequently stolen. The theft leads the Major Case Squad to a master thief, Wesley John Kenderson (David Harbour), who specializes in stealing antique silver from rich families across the country. He does it because of his resentment against their wealthy and for the challenge it provides rather than for financial gain. In a effort to provide evidence against Kenderson, Goren and Eames pressure his pregnant wife, Sheila Bradley (Callie Thorne) for information about Wesley and discover that she killed Todman because she believed the appraiser would ruin the idyllic family life she planned with Wesley.: Episode inspired by Blane Nordahl.
75	9	"Inert Dwarf"	Alex Chapple	S : René Balcer; S/T : Warren Leight	November 21, 2004	E5408	13.47
Quantum scientist Dr. Carl Neminger (Steve Routman), dies in the street from radiation poisoning. The Major Case Squad investigates Neminger's relationship with his mentor, world-renowned and wheelchair-using physicist John Manotti (Austin Pendleton) and his controversial theory. They suspect that Manotti is being abused by his highly ambitious and much younger second wife Joanna (Marla Sucharetza), however Goren and Eames discover that Manotti has failed to prove the theory on which he had based his career. They uncover that Manotti killed Neminger to silence him and avoid the embarrassment of presenting his flawed theory at an upcoming international conference, and then played on his poor health and vulnerability to avoid suspicion.
76	10	"View from Up Here"	Alex Chapple	S : René Balcer; S/T : Jim Sterling	January 2, 2005	E5410	14.85
The body of the president of a condominium association, Jay Peerson (Ken Krugman) is found dumped in the harbor after he was killed by the blade of a circular saw. When Goren and Eames begin investigating, a woman in the same new building working as a nanny is caught in a second attempted murder on another penthouse buyer, Hillary Martz (Julia Murney), and claims God told her to do it. She confesses to murdering Peerson but Goren and Eames do not believe her and uncover that she was duped by another owner, Victor Garros (Adam Goldberg) who was having an affair with Jay Peerson's wife, Darla (Kathleen Robertson) and he killed her husband out of jealousy.
77	11	"Gone"	Christopher Swartout	S : René Balcer; S/T : Stephanie Sengupta	January 9, 2005	E5406	13.23
Fiancée of Brad Wycliff, Allison Jenkins, is murdered while walking to the Wycliff home of her future mother-in-law Lenore Wycliff and Brad's brother, Jared. Their investigation leads them to Lenore's brother, using the names David Blake and Roger Wither, a former child chess prodigy. He has become highly paranoid and is blackmailing Brad into giving him the large sum of money he won years earlier in an unsanctioned chess game in Cuba against a Russian master. Goren and Eames uncover that he killed Allison Jenkins in the mistaken belief she was surveilling him and then successfully talks him out of committing suicide convincing him that as in chess, it's better to draw rather than lose the game.
78	12	"Collective"	Frank Prinzi	S : René Balcer; S/T : Gerry Conway	January 30, 2005	E5411	14.26
When a toy collector, Harry Pierce is shot dead by police in an suspected incident of domestic violence, Goren and Eames are led to a female con artist, Lori Purcell / Jocelyn Shapiro. She appears to have been exploiting lonely male collectors, but she is later found dead from carbon monoxide poisoning in a box to promote oxygen deprivation for erotic stimulation. The detectives' suspicions turn to a role-playing group obsessed with vampire fiction including her distraught boyfriend and first edition collector Dorian Cavanaugh. Goren and Eames collect the suspects together for a debriefing where they provoke Cavanaugh into confessing to Jocelyn's murder after he was led to believe she was exploiting him by the other members of the group.
79	13	"Stress Position"	Frank Prinzi	S : Warren Leight & René Balcer; S/T : Charlie Rubin	February 13, 2005	E5416	13.53
When prison guard Taylor Kenna (Charles Borland) is murdered in his apartment building two weeks before he is due to transfer to the Fire Department, Eames and Goren investigate his workplace. They encounter Mike Logan (special guest star Chris Noth), a Staten Island detective who happens to be dating the nurse at the prison, Gina Lowe (Arija Bareikis). Logan joins the duo to find out what is happening at the prison and they uncover that undocumented Federal prisoners have been held without charge on suspicion of terrorism and are being starved and brutalized by a group of prison guards led by Unit Counselor Kurt Plumm (Wayne Duvall). During a prison lockdown, Logan, Goren and nurse Lowe are cornered by Plumm and his team, but Goren manages to talk them out of attacking them and the guilty guards are taken into custody.: This episode was inspired by the Abu Ghraib torture and prisoner abuse scandal.
80	14	"Sex Club"	Alex Chapple	S : René Balcer; S/T : Elizabeth Benjamin	February 20, 2005	E5415	9.04
Playboy George Merritt (Peter Bogdanovich), publisher of "Honey" magazine, auctions off some memorabilia including a "little black book" which is bought by a former "Honey" Lila Parsons (Catherine Hickland). A former bouncer Rob McKenna (Frank Shattuck) at Merritt's sex club, Bacchus and Venus, kills her for the book to blackmail Senate Candidate Jim Radcliff (Matt Servitto) whose details appear in it. When McKenna is shot dead, Goran and Eames' attention turn to Radcliff's former wife, Kay Connelly (Rosanna Arquette) who divorced him after he took her to the club. However, the detectives discover that she then became a regular at the club, often neglecting her daughter. She killed McKenna to prevent Radcliff from seeing the book and her appearance in it as "Monique" and confesses to the murder to prevent her daughter from learning the truth about her past.: This episode references (draws on) the personal lives of Jeri Ryan and Hugh Hefner publisher of Playboy magazine.
81	15	"Death Roe"	Rick Wallace	S : René Balcer; S/T : Warren Leight	March 13, 2005	E5405	15.72
A female food critic Sally Moore (Moira Driscoll) is found beaten to death. Goren and Eames suspect the chef at the last restaurant she visited, run by upcoming chef Joshua Mailer (Alex Burns). However, Joshua has gone missing and their investigation turns to his father-in-law Tommy Onerato (Chris Penn), the owner and head chef of a popular upmarket restaurant. Joshua's beloved motorcycle is found dumped on the beach suggesting suicide, however Goren and Eames learn suspect foul play. Further investigation of Tommy, his restaurant, his bullying behavior and strained relationship with his daughter, Beatrice (Monica Keena), leads the detectives to believe that he has had a long-term incestuous relationship with her. They accuse Tommy of killing Sally Moore to frame Joshua and then killing him and cutting up his body, prompting Beatrice into revealing she has evidence of her father's actions and enabling the detectives to charge him with the two murders.
82	16	"Ex Stasis"	Bill L. Norton	S : René Balcer; S/T : Diana Son	March 20, 2005	E5419	12.35
A young woman, Vanessa Nikos (Karen Zippler) is shot during an apparent holdup at a jewelry store but survives long enough to become an organ donor. Goren and Eames track down her killer and potential lung transplant candidate, Jesse Aparicio (Luis Caballero) but find him shot dead. Further investigation leads them to compulsive living donor Boyce Wainwright (Gregg Edelman) who originally donated a kidney to Nikos and has donated other organs to people he considers worthy recipients. The detectives surmise that he had promised a lung to Aparicio in order to convince him to mortally wound Nikos whom Wainwright thought was no longer worthy of his kidney and then killed Aparicio to silence him. Wainwright only admits his guilt when A.D.A. Ron Carver promises that he can continue to donate body parts while in prison.
83	17	"Shibboleth"	Darnell Martin	S : René Balcer; S/T : Stephanie Sengupta	March 27, 2005	E5418	10.70
Office worker Phoebe Morton (Melissa Hickey) dies by bondage strangulation while her killer calls 9-1-1 and has a shibboleth, a particular articulation of "T" words. Goren and Eames realize that Morton is one of five women murdered by a serial killer known as Body By Jake (B.B.J.) between 1989 and 1992, but who has been inactive since then. Their investigation of abuse victims leads them to parolee Keith Durbin (Paul Sparks) who displays the same shibboleth as in the 9-1-1 call. He is arrested and is questioned before a Grand Jury and appears guilty but Goren is not convinced he is a killer. They question railway worker Frank McNare (Kevin Conway) at the subway station which connects the murder victims and discover he is father of Durbin. He has the same shibboleth as his son, who as a boy saw a photo of woman bound and semi-naked in his father's car, and they charge McNare with the murders.
84	18	"The Good Child"	Jean de Segonzac	S : René Balcer; S/T : Marlane Meyer	April 3, 2005	E5421	12.98
A married couple in the Witness Protection Program, Dennis and Camille Burnett are murdered in their home. Goren and Eames investigate and find that their surviving daughter Rachel (Gaby Hoffmann) is adopted and is separately seeing her birth father, Trevor Lipton (John Shea) and her birth mother, Maureen Curtis (Melissa Leo). After the detectives realize that Rachel will inherit the Burnett's wealth, and with the evidence they have uncovered, they deduce that Trevor and Maureen killed the Burnets and planned to kill Rachel after she inherited their estate which would then pass on the Trevor on her death.
85	19	"Beast"	Frank Prinzi	S : René Balcer; S/T : Gina Gionfriddo	April 10, 2005	E5420	10.94
Lisa Ross (Elizabeth Hobgood), beautiful wife of dentist Dr. Greg Ross (Bronson Pinchot), is admitted to hospital for an unknown disfiguring illness and later dies from what is determined to be dioxin poisoning. Detectives Goren and Eames uncover that ten years earlier, Ross was dating Colleen Dexler, but became engaged to her more beautiful sister, Morgan Dexler who later died from dioxin poisoning. Further investigation uncovers that Ross killed Morgan after he discovered she was cheating on him but they suspect that Colleen Dexler (Katie MacNichol) killed Lisa Ross to finally have Greg to herself. Under questioning, the detectives illicit admissions of guilt from both suspects after which Goren postulates that beauty can be a beast.
86	20	"No Exit"	Jean de Segonzac	S : René Balcer; S/T : Gerry Conway	May 1, 2005	E5423	11.60
Five young people die in a car stopped on the railroad tracks in what appears to be a suicide pact, however Goren and Eames suspect one of victims, Carmine Ruggiero (David Jenkins), had no desire to be a participant. The investigation leads the detectives to the unsolved suicide of one of Carmine's co-workers, Eadie Elverson, who had once testified against the high-pressure finance company CEO Leonard Timmons (Darrell Hammond) in a harassment suit. They eventually illicit a confession from a guilt-ridden manager, Hubert Skoller (Arye Gross ) who admits that he and Carmine did not support Eadie's valid complaint against Timmons who victimized her after she broke off their affair. Skoller confesses that he arranged for Carmine to be killed to protect Timmons and is arrested, however Goren promises him that Timmons will not escape justice.: First episode with Jamey Sheridan as Captain James Deakins shown wearing an eye-patch after displaying symptoms of Bell's palsy.
87	21	"The Unblinking Eye"	Frank Prinzi	S : René Balcer; S/T : Jim Sterling	May 8, 2005	E5424	11.54
A young actress, Dana Candon (Jicky Schnee) is gunned down after an evening out with her actor boyfriend Michael Pike (Jeff Hephner) who is also shot and wounded. Goren and Eames become suspicious when Pike plays the grieving boyfriend in the media a little too effectively. They eventually realize that Pike's best friend Ed Lang (Pablo Schreiber) who never made it as an actor, had been exploited by Pike to kill Candon. Only by convincing Lang that Pike sabotaged Lang's career to act in a movie with Matt Damon in order to further his own acting ambitions can they eventually persuade Lang to implicate Pike in the murder scheme.: Features the uncredited off-screen voice of Matt Damon as himself.
88	22	"My Good Name"	Alex Zakrzewski	S : René Balcer; S/T : Warren Leight	May 15, 2005	E5422	10.32
Goren and Eames are called to investigate the body of a hospital maintenance engineer Walter Czabo (Walter James Augustus Lee). They discover that he beat his wife Anya Czabo (Roxanna Hope) who had been sleeping with a decorated former police officer and security consultant Frank Adair (Michael Rispoli). When Anya Czabo is found dead in a car in the bay, the detectives begin to focus on Adair after they find that is also having an affair with his ambitious and controlling publicist Janice Steiner (Jenna Stern). However, because Adair has close ties to Captain James Deakins and is considering running for governor, Deakins demands strong proof. While Adair's wife Marie (Elizabeth Keifer) is assisting police inquiries in police headquarters, Goren challenges Adair about his priorities, provoking him to turn on Steiner and he implicates them both in the two murders.
89	23	"False-Hearted Judges"	Jean de Segonzac	S : René Balcer; S/T : Diana Son	May 25, 2005	E5426	14.98
Following a near riot in a courtroom by a group of men in custody led by Wade Brownfeld (Ari Fliakos) who espouses anti government values, Judge E. Barton (Susan Angelo) is ambushed and killed in her home by two men who appear to be seasoned hunters. Days later an appellate court judge, Roland Thibodeaux (Mark Kenneth Smaltz), is assassinated by a sniper. As Goren and Eames investigate the killings, they suspect that a wider anti-judiciary conspiracy is afoot and four judges have been killed in recent years. Their investigation leads them to Lloyd Anson Wilkes (David Andrews) who lost custody of his son to his ex-wife through a court order and has "adopted" a young man, Clay Turner (Jeremy Blackman) of a similar age as his surrogate son. The detectives drive an emotional wedge between them by offering Wilkes an opportunity to meet his real son, convincing Turner that Wilkes may abandon him and prompting him to divulge their joint conspiracy to murder the judges.

Preceded by Season Three	List of Law & Order: Criminal Intent episodes	Succeeded by Season Five
