= Law & Order: Criminal Intent season 5 =

Season of American television series

Law & Order: Criminal Intent
- Season 5
- Season 5 U.S. DVD cover
- No. of episodes: 22

Release
- Original network: NBC
- Original release: September 25, 2005 – May 14, 2006

Season chronology
- ← Previous; Season 4 Next → Season 6

The fifth season of Law & Order: Criminal Intent premiered on NBC on September 25, 2005, and ended on May 14, 2006.

This season featured the series's first two-part episode and "Cruise to Nowhere" was referenced later for an eighth season episode titled "All In".

This season of Law & Order: CI remained in its time slot of NBC Sunday's at 9PM/8c, its final season in this slot on NBC; its move to Tuesdays in the sixth season caused a ratings decline. During the 2005–2006 network TV season episodes were up against episodes of Desperate Housewives on ABC and episodes of Family Guy and American Dad! on Fox. The show "roller coasted" in the ratings with the competition, but NBC executives were impressed with the 11 million viewers per week it was able to retain.

== Cast and crew changes ==
Veteran stars Vincent D'Onofrio, Kathryn Erbe, Jamey Sheridan, and Courtney B. Vance returned for the fifth season of Law & Order: CI. This season, long-time Law & Order franchise actor, Chris Noth reprises his role of Detective Mike Logan partnered with Annabella Sciorra as Detective Carolyn Barek, alternating episodes with D'Onofrio and Erbe (all four work together in the two-part episode "In the Wee Small Hours"). This stemmed from star Vincent D'Onofrio fainting twice from exhaustion, once on set and again at his home, during the fourth season.

In February 2005, it was announced Noth would be joining the cast, reprising his Law & Order character after a ten-year absence. "The hardest job in show business is being a single lead on an hour drama series", creator and executive producer Dick Wolf explained. "Vincent has done an unbelievable job for the last four seasons, but after 3 years, the grueling pace finally took its toll. This is an ideal solution so that Vincent can continue to do the incredible work that has become the hallmark of the role. I've worked with Chris over the past 17 years, and bringing him on to reprise one of the most popular characters in the history of the brand, is a win-win situation."

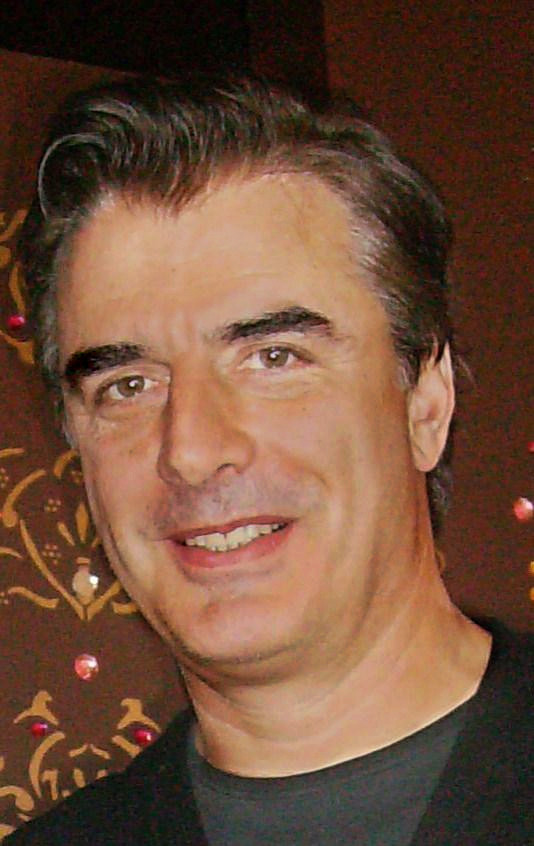
Chris Noth played Det. Mike Logan from Law & Order's 1990 debut until the 1994–95 5th season, then again in Exiled: A Law & Order Movie (1998), and in "Stress Position" in L&O: CI Season 4.

Executive producer and showrunner at the time René Balcer added, "Having written for Chris during the five years he was on Law & Order, this is a unique opportunity for me to revisit an old friend and take Detective Mike Logan into uncharted territory. We like trying new things at Criminal Intent, whether it's asking our fans to decide a character's fate or using rotating leads. As Vincent said, cool counts, and we think this idea's pretty cool. Adding Chris and a new partner to the mix allows us to create a fresh dynamic while remaining true to what's made 'Criminal Intent' a success."

In May 2005, it was announced movie actress Annabella Sciorra would be joining the cast of L&O: CI as Detective Barek, partnered with Chris Noth's Detective Mike Logan. Dick Wolf commented, "Annabella is an extremely talented and versatile actress, who has that rare combination of beauty, sex appeal, power and humor. I also anticipate she will have terrific chemistry with Chris."

Star Vincent D'Onofrio noted about the changes, "I love this show, and I hope to stay with it as long as it is on the air", D'Onofrio added. "After recently working with Chris on an episode, I am excited about what he will bring to the show creatively, and my reduced workload will be very welcome." Noth stated, "It's great to be back working with Dick and Rene and to be in the Law & Order family again, I felt very much at home when I did the guest shot and realized how terrific the cast and crew are, it was an offer that I couldn't refuse." During an interview with TV Guide, Courtney B. Vance noted how grueling the episodes were for stars D'Onofrio and Erbe, because they were in just about every scene, with Noth and Sciorra joining the cast Vance says D'Onofrio and Erbe got a break, "Chris has a wonderful energy. He likes to have fun and joke around. He and Annabella love each other, too. The seamlessness of the transition [between the two sets of leads] speaks right to the genius of Dick Wolf."

Jamey Sheridan left the cast of the show at the end of the season, mostly because Sheridan's wife and children lived in Los Angeles at the time and he had to commute weekly to New York City to film episodes. Sheridan's character Captain Deakins leaves the NYPD rather than face bogus charges set up by former Chief of Detectives Frank Adair (Michael Rispoli), whom Deakins refused to protect against charges of murdering a woman and her husband. In the sixth season, Sheridan was replaced by Eric Bogosian who played Captain Daniel Ross.

At the end of the season, Sciorra and Courtney B. Vance decided not to renew their contracts another season, in the sixth season, Sciorra was replaced by Julianne Nicholson who portrayed Detective Megan Wheeler; after this season, if an episode needed an assistant district attorney character, it would be portrayed by a guest star; in season 6 for two episodes each, Theresa Randle and Bridget Regan portrayed ADA's Patricia Kent and Claudia Shankly respectively.

Co-creator and showrunner René Balcer and executive producer Fred Berner departed the series at the end of the season; Balcer returned to the original Law & Order series with Burner for its eighteenth season, the episodes in the seventeenth season faltering. In the sixth season, Balcer was replaced by long-time Criminal Intent staffer, Warren Leight, Berner replaced by Norberto Barba.

== Cast ==
=== Main cast ===
- Vincent D'Onofrio as Detective Robert Goren – alternating with Chris Noth (Episodes 1, 3, 5–7, 9, 11, 13, 15, 17, 19, 21)
- Kathryn Erbe as Detective Alexandra Eames – alternating with Annabella Sciorra (Episodes 1, 3, 5–7, 9, 11, 13, 15, 17, 19, 21)
- Chris Noth as Detective Mike Logan – alternating with Vincent D'Onofrio (Main credit episodes 2, 4, 6–8, 10, 12, 14, 16, 18, 20, 22, recurring credit episode 1)
- Annabella Sciorra as Detective Carolyn Barek – alternating with Kathryn Erbe (Episodes 2, 4, 6–8, 10, 12, 14, 16, 18, 20, 22)
- Jamey Sheridan as Captain James Deakins
- Courtney B. Vance as ADA Ron Carver

note: for the first of only two times in the series (next in season 9), all the detectives work together in consecutive weeks, episodes 6 and 7 ("In The Wee Small Hours"), due to a particularly challenging case involving a judge.

=== Recurring cast ===
- Leslie Hendrix as Chief Medical Examiner Elizabeth Rodgers
- Robert C. Kirk as Chief of Detectives Yarrow
- Michael Rispoli as Former Chief of Detectives Frank Adiar

=== Guest stars ===
Notable guest stars in the fifth season of Law & Order: Criminal Intent include:

- Chris Noth and Olivia d'Abo in the season premiere episode, "Grow". Noth returns to his role of Detective Mike Logan, who joins the Major Case Squad (leads Chris Noth and Vincent D'Onofrio would alternate episodes throughout the season.) Olivia d'Abo returned in her recurring role of Goren's nemesis, Nicole Wallace; she helps the detectives close out the murder of a health inspector, who was the brother of Wallace's lover (Kevin J. O'Connor) at the time.
- Rebecca Wisocky guest starred in the episode "Diamond Dogs" as Dede McCann, a drug addict who manipulates her son Johnny (Peter Scanavino) into doing her bidding.
- Elizabeth Marvel portrayed the kidnapped wife of prison warden William Hendry (Corbin Bernsen) in the episode "Prisoner".
- David Keith portrayed a dirty cop named Mark Virgini, who was in league with mafiosi, in "Unchained".
- Cuban Link guest starred in the episode "Acts of Contrition" as Enrique, a pimp and gangster who sells prostitutes for money and holds them captive in his house. Also, Susan Misner portrayed Sister Olivia, a woman in a convent who knows something about a murdered nun.

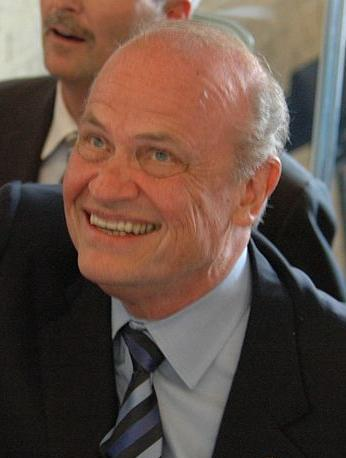
Fred Dalton Thompson

- Fred Dalton Thompson portrayed District Attorney Arthur Branch between 2002 and 2007; starring on the original Law & Order and both L&O and Law & Order: Trial by Jury in 2005. While he made many guest appearances on Law & Order: Special Victims Unit, he only appeared in Criminal Intent once, in the episode "In the Wee Small Hours". In this same episode, Colm Meaney guest-starred as Harold Garrett, a corrupt trial judge whose entire family (Lucinda Jenney as his wife Elise, Matt O'Leary as his son Ethan) is on the hook for the murder of two young girls. Also, Billy Lush returned to portray Conroy "Connie" Smith, the antagonist of the episode "Sound Bodies" (Season 3, Episode 8), in the first part of this two-part episode. This was the first episode that Geneva Carr began to portray television news reporter Faith Yancy, a recurring role she played until the ninth season.
- Samantha Mathis guest starred in the episode "Saving Face" as Dr. Christine Ansel, a doctor involved with the murder of a medical student.
- In "Scared Crazy", Jennifer Van Dyck played a secretive therapist named Katrina Pynchon who manipulates her patient, Robbie Boatman (DJ Qualls), when a programmer at a hi-tech company is murdered.
- In "Dollhouse", Heather Burns and Elizabeth Berkley portrayed two sisters who are involved in the murder of a car salesman. Danielle's lawyer, Declan Pace is played by Christopher McDonald.
- In "Slither", Michael York portrays Bernard Fremont, a sleazy European who befriends, robs, and kills tourists with the help of his blonde femme fatales, played by Brette Taylor, Dana Wheeler-Nicholson, and Wynn Everett. Nicole Wallace is also mentioned but never seen.
- Malcolm McDowell guest-starred in the episode "Proud Flesh", in which he portrayed a powerful media magnate whose son is found murdered under bizarre circumstances.
- In the episode "Wasichu", David Alan Basche plays Jay Kendall, the husband of a murdered secret service agent. Jay lobbies both for and against a native casino deal, putting him at odds with congressman Peter Bellingham (Bruce McGill) and Chief Johnson (Tom Jackson).

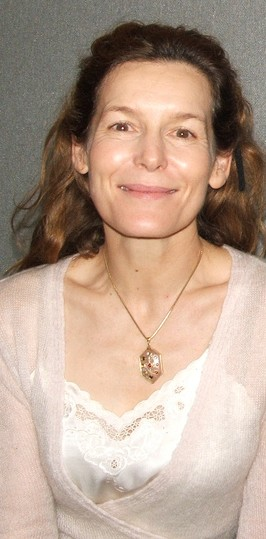
Alice Krige

- In "Dramma Giocoso", Julian Sands portraying a conductor, and Alice Krige a soprano, are on-and-off-again lovers. Logan and Barek must determine which one killed violinist Laura Booth (Marin Ireland).
- Sherri Saum portrayed Lydia Wyatt in "The Healer", as a woman who performs voodoo rituals as part of an elaborate con.
- Lou Taylor Pucci guest-starred in the episode "Cruise to Nowhere", playing Joey Frost, a kid who gets wrapped up in the world of gambling and the murder of a cruise patron. John Pankow as Phil Lambier, and Michele Pawk as Joey's mother Shari, also appear.
- Whoopi Goldberg guest starred in the episode "To the Bone" as Chesley Watkins, a woman whose former foster children rob and murder several rich people. Carolyn McCormick guest stars as Dr. Elizabeth Olivet, who helps Logan deal with his guilt after shooting undercover Officer Tarkmen, who is one of Watkins's former foster children. Graham Patrick Martin, perhaps best known as Rusty Beck on Major Crimes, makes his first screen appearance, playing Benjamin Price, one of the foster kids.
- In the episode "On Fire", Michael Rispoli reprises his role as Frank Adair who is serving life in Sing Sing (after events in "My Good Name"). Robert C. Kirk portrays Chief of Detectives Yarrow until the end of the season. Goren and Eames track arson/murder suspects and uncover a family secret; Josh Hamilton and Theresa Russell co-star.
- "The Good" season finale guest-stars include Kevin Dunn as Det. Carson Laird who presses a confession from Kevin Colemar, played by Keith Nobbs. Elisabeth Moss has a supporting role as Kevin's sister Rebecca.

== Episodes ==
No. overall	No. in season	Title	Directed by	Written by	Original release date	Prod. code	U.S. viewers (millions)
90	1	"Grow"	Frank Prinzi	S : René Balcer; S/T : Marlane Gomard Meyer	September 25, 2005	05001	10.72
As Detective Mike Logan joins the Major Case team, detectives Goren and Eames investigate the death of a city health inspector Larry Chapel (Boris McGiver). They question victim's brother Evan Chapel, (Kevin J. O'Connor), a recently widowed medical examiner with a young daughter Gwen, and discover he is romantically involved with the re-surfaced Nicole Wallace (Olivia d'Abo). They uncover a complex web of intrigue where after Gwen received a $5 million medical payout, the brothers killed Evan's wife and planned to kill Gwen to get the money. Meanwhile, Nichole had become to view Gwen as her surrogate daughter but when she realized their conspiracy, she left Gwen with an aunt and gave Evan up to he police before she again disappeared.
91	2	"Diamond Dogs"	Norberto Barba	S : Warren Leight & René Balcer; S/T : Charlie Rubin	October 2, 2005	05002	12.35
A young man robs a local jewelry store at gunpoint and unnecessarily shoots the owner in his rush to escape. After more robberies and murders occur, Captain James Deakins pressures Logan and his new partner Barek for results. They eventually track down a drug-addicted mother and son team, Dede McCann (Rebecca Wisocky) and Johnny Feist (Peter Scanavino). They have enough evidence to convict Johnny, but no hard evidence against Dede who is controlling him. Logan and Barek eventually make Johnny realize that he needs medical help, and after revealing that Dede killed his girlfriend Maya (Zoe Lister Jones), he implicates her in their joint enterprise.
92	3	"Prisoner"	Rick Wallace	S : René Balcer; S/T : Gina Gionfriddo	October 9, 2005	05003	12.89
Prison warden William Hendry (Corbin Bernsen) is found tied to a fence with wire and claims it was done by two unknown attackers, but Goren and Eames suspect he did it himself. They find that ten years earlier his wife Jenny Hendry (Elizabeth Marvel) was abducted by a prisoner Vic Bowman (Brian Tarantina), and that Hendry may be the victim of a ransom demand. The detectives find Vic and Jenny who appear to have been living happily together for 10 years. Vic tells them that Hendry hired him to kill Jenny, but he decided to let her live. Hendry implores Jenny to return to him, but the detectives they later discover that Jenny has an inheritance and accuse William of scheming to bring her back under his control. They finally manage to convince her that he was only after her money.
93	4	"Unchained"	Alex Zakrzewski	S : René Balcer; S/T : Stephanie Sengupta	October 16, 2005	05004	10.18
After Joe Long (Sam Riley), the son of a police Officer Long (John Michael Bolger) is murdered by mistake, investigating detectives Logan and Barek are led to two rival Mafia families. When the bodies of bookie, George "Big Georgie" Branson (Jerry Russo) and his receptionist girlfriend, Judy Cordova (Kathryn Albarelli), are then found buried under concrete, evidence points to police involvement in the murders. Captain Deakins wants both the tainted officers and a mob underboss brought to justice, so Logan and Barek focus on two implicated detectives, Albert Kirkoff (Nick Sandow) and a decorated ex-officer, Detective Mark Virgini (David Keith). During arraignment, Logan has his former indiscretions raised by Virgini's lawyer but he pursues his target, eventually convincing Virgini's recently returned daughter, Renata (Kelly Karbacz), to give evidence against him when she realizes he is not the hero he portrays himself to be.: Inspired by Louis Eppolito and Stephen Caracappa crimes.
94	5	"Acts of Contrition"	Frank Prinzi	S : René Balcer; S/T : Warren Leight	October 23, 2005	05005	10.45
Sister Dorothy (Amy Wright) runs a shelter program for girls rescued from prostitution and is accidentally killed in her inner-city church by an intruder. During their investigation, detectives Goren and Eames come across a determined young man Eddie Roberts (Lawrence Gilliard, Jr.) who is seeking justice for his older brother James (Jimmy) Jones (Barry Martin) who was incapacitated after a racial hate assault years earlier. Roberts has spent the following years searching for a female witness who now appears to be one of Sister Dorothy's proteges, Sister Olivia (Susan Misner) formerly known as Angie DelMarco. Eventually, Roberts agrees to confess to killing Sister Dorothy if Sister Olivia will make a sealed confession to her role in the attack on his brother which would be unsealed following Jimmy's inevitable early death from his injuries. Cuban Link makes a guest appearance as the pimp, Enrique.
95	6	"In the Wee Small Hours"	Jean de Segonzac	S : René Balcer; S/T : Stephanie Sengupta	November 6, 2005	05006	14.28
96	7	"In the Wee Small Hours"	Jean de Segonzac	S : René Balcer; S/T : Stephanie Sengupta	November 6, 2005	05007	14.28
Part 1: A visiting Iowa teen, Bethany Lunden, disappears during her New York City school trip. A media frenzy engulfs the Major case squad detectives Goren, Eames, Logan, and Barek when their prime suspect Ethan Garrett (Matt O'Leary), is a powerful judge's son. The detectives even put Conroy "Connie" Smith (Billy Lush) (Note: Season 3, Episode 8, "Sound Bodies".) in a cell with Ethan in an effort to extract a confession. The case widens when another missing girl, Tiana Peterson, is found dead after meeting Ethan, but her case wasn't given as much attention since she was black. When Bethany's body is found, Ethan's philandering father, District Court Judge Harold Garrett (Colm Meaney), becomes a murder suspect himself. Part 2: Judge Garrett strikes back in very personal ways against detectives Goren, Logan and Barek using information he gathered through a private investigator to throw doubt on their integrity and discredit their case. Meanwhile, ADA Ron Carver has to deal with convicting the judge's son, who reveals he knows more than he should about Bethany's demise. Detective Goren uses his unique investigation methods to illicit a confession from Garrett of rape, but Goren realizes that it was Garrett's wife, Elise Garrett (Lucinda Jenney), who murdered Bethany and disposed of her body in an effort to protect her son from prosecution.: Special appearance by Fred Dalton Thompson as DA Arthur Branch. This was his only appearance in Criminal Intent.
97	8	"Saving Face"	Rick Wallace	S : René Balcer; S/T : Gerry Conway	November 27, 2005	05008	10.95
The body of female medical student, Kerri Livanski (Erin Fritch) is found with body parts missing after she returned from a trip to Guatemala. Detectives Logan and Barek assume that she was a drug "mule" smuggling narcotics, but a forensic examination rules that out. Evidence leads to a nurse's aide, Antonio Morales (Vincent Laresca) who is working for cosmetic surgeon, Christine Ansel, (Samantha Mathis). She runs a charity called the Frederick Foundation after her dead brother which claims to provide facial reconstruction for the poor in Central America. However, the detectives realize that she is incapable of performing surgery and the charity is fraudulent. The uncover that Morales actually carries out operations for poor Latin American New Yorkers instead while claiming that they live in Guatemala. When confronted, Ansel confesses murdering Livanski because she would have exposed her deception, but she also blames her parents for whom she was considered only a surrogate for their dead son whose memory she could never live up to.
98	9	"Scared Crazy"	Marisol Torres	S : René Balcer; S/T : Diana Son	December 4, 2005	05009	11.85
The slaying of a young computer company employee, Aidan Grant (Ciaran Tyrrell), at a high security software company Ubicool has Detectives Goren and Eames poking around another software company in the next building. They lock onto an unstable code-writer Robbie Boatman (DJ Qualls), who leads them to believe he is being manipulated by his secretive therapist Katrina Pynchon (Jennifer Van Dyck). When they discover that Pynchon had been involved in developing psychological torture techniques in Guantanamo Bay, Goren believes she used those techniques, including playing loud music on Boatman to help him overcome his fears. Instead it caused him to kill Grant because of similar loud music he heard coming from an afterhours Ubicool office party.
99	10	"Dollhouse"	Frank Prinzi	S : René Balcer; S/T : Gina Gionfriddo	January 8, 2006	05010	10.79
The shooting murder of married auto dealer Joseph Sabo (Kent Cassella) initially perplexes Detectives Logan and Barek. However, they discover that he, and other cheating family men, were being blackmailed by phony paternity claims of a self-involved and exploitative mother Danielle Quinn (Elizabeth Berkley). After they arrest her, the detectives discover that Danielle's seemingly meek and maternal sister Claire Quinn (Heather Burns) is having an affair with Danielle's lawyer, Declan Pace (Christopher McDonald). This leads them to eventually uncover that Sabo planned to kill Danielle instead of paying her when she ambushed him instead, but it was a plot hatched between Claire and Pace to gain custody of Danielle's child after she would be arrested for the murder.
100	11	"Slither"	Bill L. Norton	S : René Balcer; S/T : Marlane Gomard Meyer	January 15, 2006	05011	10.82
An out of town couple, Russ (John Bolger) and Monica (Mariann Mayberry) Corbett, are found semi-naked in a chaep hotel room overdosed with heroin while their high class rented accommodation has been stripped bare. Detectives Goren and Eames discover that this is the modus operandi of a gang of criminals led by the charming Bernard Fremont (Thierry Gervais) (Michael York), an Englishman born in Thailand. Fremont finds his marks by hosting lavish parties co-hosted by his three attractive blonde adoring cohorts. Goren is shocked to discover that Fremont was convicted in Thailand for befriending, robbing and killing tourists, and that his associate at the time was Goren's nemesis, Nicole Wallace (Olivia d'Abo). It is only by undermining Fremont's hubris and convincing him that his women had turned against him, that Goren manages to provoke Fremont into confessing his guilt. However, when Fremont and his women are freed on million dollar bails, he is murdered by a poisonous hypodermic needle as he departs, leaven Goren to assume that Wallace is still active.
101	12	"Watch"	Alex Chapple	S : René Balcer; S/T : Charlie Rubin	January 22, 2006	05012	10.52
The body of a woman falls from an airplane wheel well into the water off the beach near JFK Airport. Detectives Logan and Barek discover that she is Marcy (Tia Dionne Hodge), a New York prostitute who had been beaten to death and that four other women have met the same fate on outbound airplanes which landed in other countries. While questioning airport workers they focus on the officious FAA Inspector, Duane Winslow (Brad Renfro) and his bullying cousin Art Geddens (Ethan Embry). The detectives suspect that Winslow finds women so that Geddens can beat them to death while he watches from another room. It is only when they show Geddens that Winslow planned to kill him and himself after the next victim, that their secret alliance breaks down and they provide the detectives with the evidence need to charge them for the murders.
102	13	"Proud Flesh"	Frank Prinzi	S : René Balcer; S/T : Warren Leight	March 12, 2006	05013	12.27
When Jonas "Trip" Slaughter III (Alex Draper) son of a powerful radio magnate, Jonas Slaughter (Malcolm McDowell), is found murdered during what appears to be a kinky sexual encounter, detectives Goren and Eames believe the crime is connected to a power struggle over the family trust. As they investigate, possible suspects include Slaughter's Chinese-born wife, Anna Slaughter (Cindy Cheung), her former husband Professor Larry Lewis (Mark Blum), Oscar Landau (Michael Berresse) a globetrotting private investigator and Jonas Slaughter senior himself. Finally, they have enough evidence to arraign Slaughter for arranging the murder of Trip because of his son's animosity towards his marriage to Anna and their mixed race daughter, and more importantly, ruin the family's reputation. As Slaughter leaves the courtroom on bail, his other loyal son, Chance (Matthew Morrison) draws a gun to shoot Anna but is shot first by Eames. With his dying breath, Chance confesses to the murder so his father cannot be convicted for Trip's death.
103	14	"Wasichu"	Christopher Swartout	S : René Balcer; S/T : Diana Son	March 19, 2006	05014	11.38
The brutal beating murder of Secret Service agent Paula Kendall (Georgia Hatzis) in her home, has Detectives Logan and Barek perplexed until they realize that her husband Jay Kendall's (David Alan Basche) lucrative activities as a lobbyist may be the motive. They discover he is considered a wasi'chu by an American Indian community trying to develop a gaming casino on Long Island while he was also working for opponents of the proposal. The detectives find that Kendall also hid his wife's laptop and shredded files detailing his business activities soon after discovering her body, including his work for a corrupt congressman, Peter Bellingham (Bruce McGill). They eventually uncover that Bellingham had ex-cop Ted Bruno (James Biberi) search the Kendall home for information on his illegal activities after he discovered that Paula was a Secret Service agent, but Bruno killed her when she unexpectedly arrived home early.
104	15	"Wrongful Life"	Darnell Martin	S : René Balcer; S/T : Gerry Conway	March 26, 2006	05015	9.22
Detectives Goren and Eames are called in to investigate the death of a young man, Eric Newsome (Vincent Piazza) who is found dead in a building's water tower and find that he was with his sister, Nikki (Jessica Collins) and a friend in a break-in adventure. While investigating Newsome's activities, they find that he broke in and stole a file relevant to a $20-million lawsuit being brought by Victoria Carson (Talia Balsam) the mother of Nikki's boyfriend, Drew Ramsey (Jonathan Tucker), for a "wrongful life" court case over her daughter Lisa (Alison Pill) who was born with spina bifida. The detectives discover that Newsome found letter which indicated that self-interested Victoria Carson avoided a test of the fetus which may have indicated the probability of spina bifida so she could marry her fiancée, the son of the wealthy Carson family which undermined her lawsuit. Drew confesses to the murder but the detectives convince him to implicate his mother for directing him to do it so that his sister Lisa, would not be left in the custody of her uncaring mother.
105	16	"Dramma Giocoso"	John David Coles	S : René Balcer; S/T : Stephanie Sengupta	April 9, 2006	05016	10.00
A young violinist, Laura Booth (Marin Ireland), is pushed to her death during intermission at an opera performance. Detectives Logan and Barek initially suspect the arrogant conductor Philip Reinhardt (Julian Sands) who has been conducting an affair with Laura's mother, soprano Gillian Booth (Alice Krige). While gathering evidence, the detectives discover that Gillian is in the early stage of a debilitating form of dementia. Meanwhile, she marries the maestro so she wouldn't be able to testify against him and hoping that he will care for her as she declines. However, when the detectives reveal Gillian's condition to Reinhardt, he callously rejects her and she confesses that she killed her daughter because she perceived her as a threat to her relationship with Reinhardt.
106	17	"Vacancy"	Jean de Segonzac	S : René Balcer; S/T : Gina Gionfriddo	April 16, 2006	05017	11.91
In mid-winter, two bridesmaids, Alice (Emily Bergl) and Megan Cole (Kristin Vogelsong), are stranded in New York and they stay overnight at a cheap hotel recommended by their taxi driver, Tim Rainey (Desmond Harrington). Later that night Megan is bludgeoned to death, initially casting suspicion on Alice, but even though Alice confesses to the murder because of her drunken state, Detective Eames does not believe she is the culprit. Goren and Eames track down Rainey, the taxi driver, and find that he is a committed method actor seeking a movie role as a serial killer and that his mother was killed in a similar manner by a stalker when he was a child. Eventually the detectives solicit a confession from Rainey who still harbored resentment against his mother whom he saw as a victim.
107	18	"The Healer"	Frank Prinzi	S : René Balcer; S/T : Marlane Gomard Meyer	April 23, 2006	05018	11.13
Two sisters who are found wrapped in plastic "cocoons" and asphyxiated have Detectives Logan and Barek questioning one victim's boyfriend, Jack Strong (Patch Darragh), who works for Lydia Wyatt (Sherri Saum), a local nurse. Logan initially questions Lydia and soon runs afoul of her "powers", contracting a skin rash. As the detectives investigate her past, they begin to suspect her of extorting money from patients with voodoo, giving them false hope with her potent spells and medicine. When Jack Strong dies from puffer fish poisoning, they pressure her remaining supporter, Robbie Paulson (Oscar Isaac) into revealing her scheme and they charge her with the murders.
108	19	"Cruise to Nowhere"	Marisol Torres	S : René Balcer; S/T : Warren Leight	April 30, 2006	05019	9.69
When the body of a former school chancellor, Benton Williams (Jay Patterson) is fished out of the Hudson River, Detectives Goren and Eames find out that he was a high roller on a casino boat off the New York coast. They soon zero in on Joey Frost (Lou Taylor Pucci), a talented but arrogant young gambler who was owed $500,000 by the victim. But the police also cannot ignore the dead man's resentful brother-in-law Phil Lambier, (John Pankow) when they discover that he not only raised Joey, but taught him poker and intentionally placed him on the ship on the fateful night. When they convince Joey that Lambier killed his father so that he could exploit Joey's talent as a card player, he implicates Lambier in Williams' murder.
109	20	"To the Bone"	Jean de Segonzac	S : Warren Leight & René Balcer; S/T : Charlie Rubin	May 7, 2006	05022	10.35
Two brutal machete slayings of entire families of affluent art owners has Detectives Logan and Barek looking for a young suspect, Antonio Mattini (Octavio Gómez). They find was raised by a strong-willed foster mother, Chesley Watkins (Whoopi Goldberg), and the detectives track him down to the burger joint where he works. However, during an altercation when the other three suspects arrive, Logan unknowingly shoots an undercover policeman dead. Captain Deakins supports his Logan, who stays on the case and he learns that the youths are all foster children of the manipulative Watkins, including the dead officer. After Mattini is killed in hospital, Logan and Barek manage to catch the three other foster boys they suspect of the slayings, and also charge Watkins with complicity. However, when the one boy they have convinced to testify jumps to his death from a courthouse window, their case falls apart and Watkins is released.
110	21	"On Fire"	Frank Prinzi	S : René Balcer; S/T : Diana Son	May 14, 2006	05021	11.92
A church worker Margaret Collo (Beth Fowler) is found dead after a series of arson attacks initially on a number of churches. Goren and Eames trace evidence back to the dysfunctional family of the Reids; handsome youth leader Justin Reid (Josh Hamilton), his step parents Regina (Theresa Russell) and Terry (Joseph Siravo), their disaffected son Glynn (Adam Scarimbolo) and best friend Charlie Taylor (Jeremy Webb). The detectives discover that Glynn is the son of Regina and Justin who was conceived while Terry was away. Glynn burned down the churches with Charlie when he learned the truth about his birth in an anonymous letter from Collo. Later, Justin killed Charlie to deflect the blame away from Glynn without realizing that Glynn was his son. Meanwhile, Capt. Deakins is investigated for apparently abusing his position to promote the officer who exonerated Logan for murdering an undercover policeman in "To the Bone". Although Goren and Eames uncover that he has been is set up by Frank Adair (Michael Rispoli) who has a vendetta against him after the events in "My Good Name", Deakins nevertheless decides to resign.
111	22	"The Good"	Christopher Swartout	S : René Balcer; S/T : Gerry Conway	May 14, 2006	05020	11.92
A suburban couple, Lily and Dan Colemar, are found bludgeoned to death in Nassau County and Detectives Logan and Barek initially suspect that their drug-troubled son Kevin Colemar (Keith Nobbs) killed them for cash to pay a drug debt. But after a local Nassau Investigator (Kevin Dunn) pressures Kevin into a confession, the city cops discover a potential conflict of interest and a desire for a quick result. However, another suspect emerges with a possible motive, Wallace Kenter (Tom Riis Farrell), an artist who had a business arrangement for gallery franchises with Dan Colemar. Now close to retirement, Captain Deakins encourages Logan and Barek to pursue the non-jurisdictional case. Logan and Barek eventually link a violent ex-con, Jules Bremner (Michael Peter Bolus) to Kenter and charge them with the murders.

Preceded by Season Four	List of Law & Order: Criminal Intent episodes	Succeeded by Season Six

== Notes ==
Preceded by Season Four	List of Law & Order: Criminal Intent episodes	Succeeded by Season Six
