= Luis Caballero =

Luis Caballero may refer to:

- Luis Caballero (comedian), comedian and writer
- Luis Caballero (footballer) (born 1962), Paraguayan footballer
- Luis Caballero (painter) (1943–1995), Colombian painter
- Luis Nery Caballero (born 1990), Paraguayan footballer
