= Susan Shapiro =

American author

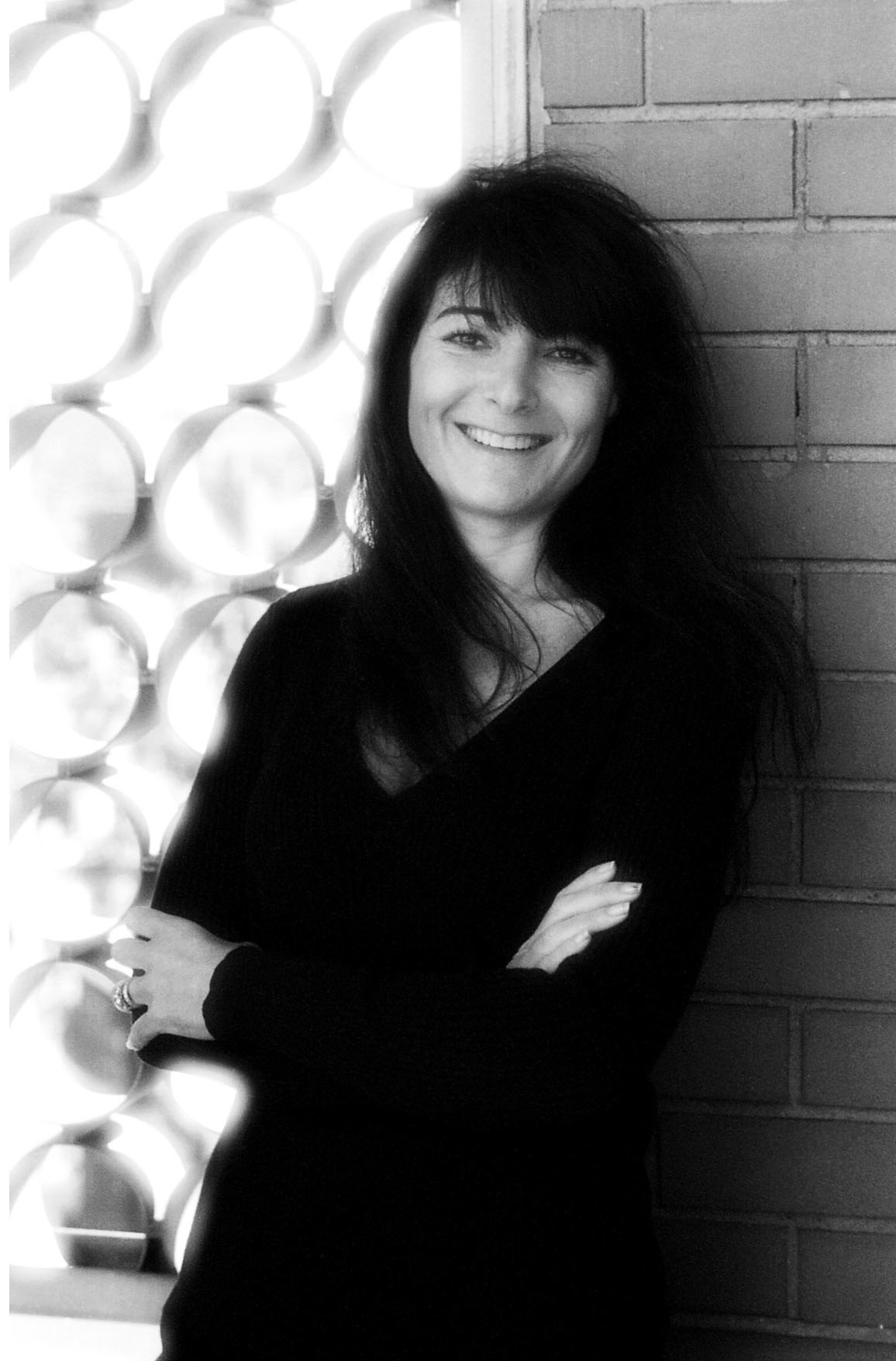
- Susan Shapiro
- Born: Philadelphia, PA
- Occupation: Author
- Spouse: Charlie Rubin
- Writing career
- Language: English
- Genre: Non-fiction

Susan Shapiro is the American author of 17 books, including The Byline Bible, Five Men Who Broke My Heart, Only as Good as Your Word, Lighting Up, Speed Shrinking, and What's Never Said, and coauthor of The Bosnia List and the New York Times bestseller Unhooked.

== Career ==
She has written for The New Yorker, The New York Times, The Washington Post, The Wall Street Journal, Newsweek, The Nation, The Daily Beast, Salon.com, Oprah.com, Glamour, and Marie Claire magazines.

Shapiro was on the board of the National Book Critics Circle and has been an award-winning writing professor at The New School and New York University since 1993. Her writing and publishing advice to students was compiled in The Byline Bible.

She is married to TV/film writer Charlie Rubin.

== Works ==
=== Non-fiction ===
- The Male-to-Female Dictionary, Berkley Trade, 1996, ISBN 978-1572971165
- Food for the Soul: Selections from the Holy Apostles Soup Kitchen Writers Workshop, co-edited with Elizabeth Maxwell, Seabury Books, 2000, ISBN 978-1596270015
- Five Men Who Broke My Heart: A Memoir, Delacorte Press, 2004, ISBN 978-0385337236
- Lighting Up: How I Stopped Smoking, Drinking, and Everything Else I Loved in Life Except Sex: A Memoir, Delacorte Press, 2004, ISBN 978-0385338332
- Secrets of a Fix-up Fanatic: How to Meet & Marry Your Match, Delta, 2006, ISBN 978-0385340595
- Only as Good as Your Word: Writing Lessons from My Favorite Literary Gurus, Seal Press, 2007, ISBN 978-1580052207
- Unhooked: How to Quit Anything, MJF, 2014, ISBN 978-1606712269
- The Bosnia List: A Memoir of War, Exile, and Return, co-authored with Kenan Trebincevic, Penguin Books, 2014, ISBN 978-0143124573
- Kick Your Addiction: How to Quit Anything, co-authored with Frederick Woolverton, Skyhorse Publishing, 2014, ISBN 978-1629145877
- The Byline Bible: Get Published in Five Weeks, Writer's Digest Books, 2018, ISBN 978-1440353680
- Barbie: 60 Years of Inspiration, Assouline, 2019, ISBN 978-1614287575
- The Forgiveness Tour: How to Find the Perfect Apology, Skyhorse Publishing, 2021, ISBN 978-1510762718

=== Fiction ===
- Speed Shrinking, Thomas Dunne Books, 2009, ISBN 978-0312581565
- Overexposed: A novel, Thomas Dunne Books, 2010, ISBN 978-0312581572
- What's Never Said, Heliotrope Books, 2015, ISBN 978-1942762164
