= Garrett Zuercher =

American actor and director (born 1979)

- Born: Garrett Zuercher; 18 December 1979 (age 46); United States of America
- Years active: 2003-
- Awards: Jean Kennedy Smith playwriting award

Garrett Zuercher is an American deaf actor, director, and playwright.

== Deaf West Theatre ==
- Big River (Broadway National Tour) - Huckleberry Finn (lead)

== Television ==
- Law & Order: Criminal Intent (Tommy Kellerman), episode 6x18 Silencer

== Filmography ==
- See What I'm Saying
- Eu & Tu (Stephen)
