= Bill O'Brien (actor) =

American actor

- Education: University of Northern Iowa
- Occupation: Actor

Bill O'Brien is an American former television series actor and currently the Senior Advisor for Program Innovation at the National Endowment for the Arts (NEA).

== Political career ==
O'Brien was appointed the Senior Advisor to the National Endowment for the Arts, shortly after the election of President Barack Obama in 2008. At the NEA, O'Brien leads the Walter Reed/NEA Healing Arts Partnership. This initiative explores the role of the arts in assisting military service members recovering from traumatic brain injuries and psychological health issues. O'Brien also led the State Department's Declaration of Learning initiative.

== Theatre ==
O'Brien graduated with a degree in Musical Theater from the University of Northern Iowa in 1985. He was nominated as the NEA's Director of Theater and Musical Theater in July 2006. In 2007, he designed and launched the NEA National New Play Development Program, administered by Arena Stage, which included the NEA Outstanding New American Play and the Distinguished New Play Development selections.

Before joining the NEA, he served for seven years as producing director and managing director for Deaf West Theater (DWT). The Broadway production of Big River, produced by Deaf West Theater during O’Brien's tenure, was nominated for a Tony Award and a Drama Desk Award. He also received three Ovation Award nominations for his work on the Deaf West production of Big River as producer, sound designer, and lead actor. The production won three Best Musical awards (Ovation, LADCC, and Back Stage Garland Awards), and the cast of Big River was awarded the 2004 Tony for Excellence in Theatre. Other productions he produced for Deaf West include A Streetcar Named Desire (Ovation Award for Best Play) and Oliver! (Ovation Award for Best Musical).

O'Brien has also served as executive vice president on the executive board of the National Alliance for Music Theater, and as a task force member, conference speaker, and grant panelist with Theater Communications Group. O'Brien has performed onstage in 48 states in numerous national touring and regional productions and was an American College Theater Festival Irene Ryan Acting Competition National Finalist.

== Filmography ==
=== Television ===
Year	Title	Role	Notes
2001	Gideon's Crossing	Conor McGrath	2 episodes
2002	Providence	Brian McCulley	Episode: "Great Expectations"
2000–2005	The West Wing	Kenny Thurman	15 episodes
2007	Law & Order: Criminal Intent	Detective Peter Lyons	Episode: "Silencer"
