= Luis Caballero (comedian) =

Puerto Rican comedian and writer

Luis Caballero is a comedian and writer of Puerto Rican descent, who lived in New York City for most of his life. After performing stand-up in comedy clubs for several years, he teamed up with filmmaker Ben Model to adapt his comedy material into a film. That film, which Model produced and directed, became The Puerto Rican Mambo (Not a Musical), a 74-minute feature which was released theatrically in 1992 and on home video in 1996. Caballero's sardonic humor sought to shed light on the Puerto Rican experience.
