= Charlie Rubin =

American screenwriter

- Born: 20th century
- Occupations: Humorist, screenwriter, professor
- Spouse: Susan Shapiro
- Writing career
- Language: English
- Genres: Comedy, television

Charlie Rubin is an American television comedy writer, producer, and humorist.

He has written for National Lampoon, The Carol Burnett Show, In Living Color, The Jon Stewart Show, Saturday Night Live, Seinfeld, and Law & Order: Criminal Intent.

== Education and early career ==
Rubin attended the Horace Mann School in the Riverdale neighborhood of the Bronx. He then attended Williams College, from which he graduated in 1972. While at Williams, Rubin, along with his friend, Mitchell Rapoport, founded The Williams Advocate. He also produced an original musical called Sizzle with William Finn at the Adams Memorial Theater. It was the first original musical to be mounted at Williams College since Stephen Sondheim attended over twenty years earlier.

== Teaching career ==
Rubin is a professor at NYU's Tisch School of the Arts in the Rita & Burton Goldberg Department of Dramatic Writing, where he teaches writing for television.

== Personal life ==
He married writer Susan Shapiro on July 27, 1996.
