= List of Law & Order: Special Victims Unit characters =

Fictional character list

The cast of seasons 19–20 (2018–2019). From left to right: Peter Scanavino, Kelli Giddish, Mariska Hargitay, Ice-T, and Philip Winchester.

Law & Order: Special Victims Unit, a spin-off of the crime drama Law & Order, follows the detectives who work in the "Special Victims Unit" of the 16th Precinct of the New York City Police Department, a unit that focuses on crimes involving rape, sexual assault, and child molestation, as well as any crime loosely connected with any of the three, such as domestic violence, kidnapping, and child abandonment. Since its debut in September 1999, the series has followed the career of Olivia Benson, as she progresses from the rank of Detective, working with a partner (initially Elliot Stabler, and later Nick Amaro), to Sergeant and then to Lieutenant, replacing Donald Cragen as commanding officer of SVU, and then to Captain. The unit also has a prosecutor assigned from the District Attorney's office, and frequently interacts with medical examiners and psychiatrists.

Four of the regular characters have appeared as regulars in other NBC series: Captain Donald Cragen (Florek), who was on the first three seasons of Law & Order; ADA Alexandra Cabot (March), who led the cast of Conviction; Sergeant John Munch (Belzer), as a Baltimore detective in Homicide: Life on the Street. and Detective Elliot Stabler (Meloni) on Law & Order: Organized Crime.

== Creation and conception ==
The characters of Elliot Stabler & Olivia Benson were named for creator Dick Wolf's children. Wolf's third child, daughter Sarina, had a character named for her; Benson's mother was named Serena, as well as former ADA Serena Southerlyn on the original Law & Order and Det. Serena Stevens on Law & Order: Criminal Intent.

== Cast history ==
The series originally centered on Senior SVU detective Elliot Stabler (Christopher Meloni) and his partner Junior SVU detective Olivia Benson (Mariska Hargitay). Stabler was a veteran detective who attempted to shield his family from the disturbing cases he encountered, while Benson's background as the daughter of a rape victim influenced her decision to join the Special Victims Unit. They initially worked with Senior SVU Detective John Munch (Richard Belzer), a transfer from Baltimore's homicide unit, and his first partner, Junior SVU detecive Brian Cassidy (Dean Winters). Detectives Monique Jeffries (Michelle Hurd) and Ken Briscoe (Chris Orbach) also supported the unit.

After 13 episodes, Cassidy transferred to the narcotics division after the SVU cases brought back memories of his childhood sexual abuse. Jeffries subsequently became Munch's partner for the remainder of the first season, while Briscoe was phased out. At the beginning of season two, Jeffries left the unit after disclosing to a department psychiatrist that she had previously slept with a suspect. Munch was then partnered with Detective Odafin "Fin" Tutuola (Ice-T), who became his permanent partner.

The detectives were initially supervised by Captain Donald Cragen (Dann Florek), who served as the unit's commanding officer through season 15. Cragen had previously appeared on Law & Order as the commanding officer of the Manhattan North Homicide precinct. The unit also worked closely with FBI Special Agent Dr. George Huang (BD Wong), who served as a criminal profiler, and Medical Examiner Dr. Melinda Warner (Tamara Tunie).

The unit's prosecutorial staff also changed frequently. Alexandra Cabot (Stephanie March) became SVU's first full-time assistant district attorney in season two. After entering the Witness Protection Program following an attempted assassination in season five, she was replaced by Casey Novak (Diane Neal). Novak remained until the end of season nine, when she was censured for violating due process while prosecuting a police officer accused of rape. Kim Greylek (Michaela McManus) became ADA at the beginning of season 10, but Cabot returned midway through the season after Greylek returned to the Justice Department in Washington, D.C. Cabot remained through the second half of season 10 and most of season 11.

During season 11, Sonya Paxton (Christine Lahti) and Jo Marlowe (Sharon Stone) served as ADAs following Cabot's departure. Gillian Hardwicke (Melissa Sagemiller) served as the ADA during season 12, with Novak making a guest appearance after completing her suspension. Paxton also returned for a final appearance during the season, in which she was murdered by a rapist and murderer after leaving behind evidence that helped secure his conviction. In season 13, Cabot and Novak returned as rotating ADAs.

Beginning with the second episode of season 14, Rafael Barba (Raúl Esparza) became SVU's primary prosecutor. He remained in the position until leaving midway through season 19 following a case involving the kidnapping and subsequent death of an infant. Peter Stone (Philip Winchester), previously the lead prosecutor on Chicago Justice, then joined SVU after that series was canceled following one season. Stone left at the end of season 20, and former SVU detective Dominick Carisi Jr. (Peter Scanavino) became the unit's ADA at the beginning of season 21.

The detective squad underwent a major change during season 13 when Stabler retired from the NYPD following the shooting depicted in the season 12 finale. He returned in season 22 following the murder of his wife, Kathy, and subsequently joined the NYPD's Organized Crime Control Bureau in Law & Order: Organized Crime. FBI Special Agent Huang also departed after being reassigned to Oklahoma City, although he continued to appear occasionally. Detectives Nick Amaro (Danny Pino) and Amanda Rollins (Kelli Giddish) joined the unit, replacing Stabler.

During season 15, Munch and Cragen retired from the NYPD. Benson, who had been promoted to sergeant, subsequently assumed command of the unit. She was promoted to lieutenant at the beginning of season 17 and captain at the beginning of season 21.

Season 16 introduced several changes to the squad. Carisi joined as a detective at the beginning of the season, while Amaro left at the end of the season after being wounded in the line of duty and relocating to California to be closer to his children. Deputy Chief William Dodds (Peter Gallagher) was also introduced, serving as commanding officer of the Special Victims Units across New York City's five boroughs. His son, Sergeant Mike Dodds (Andy Karl), transferred to SVU in season 17 and became Benson's second-in-command. He died at the end of the season. Fin subsequently passed the sergeant's examination in season 18 and was officially promoted to the position in season 19.

Following Carisi's transfer to the District Attorney's Office in season 21, Vice Officer Katriona "Kat" Tamin (Jamie Gray Hyder) joined SVU after assisting with several cases and was eventually promoted to detective. Dodds left the series at the beginning of the season following the fallout from the case involving media mogul Tobias Moore (Ian McShane), and Christian Garland (Demore Barnes) succeeded him as deputy chief.

At the beginning of season 23, Tamin and Garland resigned from the NYPD. Tamin was replaced by Detective Joe Velasco (Octavio Pisano), while Chief Tommy McGrath (Terry Serpico) temporarily assumed Garland's position. During season 24, Detective Grace Muncy (Molly Burnett) joined the unit after helping solve a case involving a teenage Dominican gang. Rollins left SVU and the NYPD midway through the season after accepting a teaching position at Fordham University. Detectives Terry Bruno (Kevin Kane) and Tonie Churlish (Jasmine Batchelor) also joined the unit from the Brooklyn SVU. Muncy later left to join a DEA task force, while Churlish also departed.

In season 25, McGrath was replaced as chief following his interference in his daughter's rape case. IAB Captain Renee Curry (Aimé Donna Kelly) subsequently joined SVU. FBI Agent Shannah Sykes (Jordana Spiro) was later assigned to the unit after assisting in the rescue of a kidnapped girl. Sykes left at the end of the season after solving the murder of her missing sister.

At the beginning of season 26, former homicide detective Kate Silva (Juliana Aidén Martinez) joined SVU. Rollins also returned to the NYPD after consulting on several cases, receiving a promotion to sergeant and becoming commanding officer of the department's Intelligence Unit. Silva later transferred out of SVU.

At the beginning of season 27, Kathryn Tynan (Noma Dumezweni) assumed the vacant position of Chief of Detectives. Fin was subsequently injured while attempting to stop a mugging that was revealed to be a setup by two con artists. While he recovered, Tynan assigned Vice Detective Jake Griffin (Corey Cott), the son of her former partner, to SVU. Velasco later left the unit after being recruited by the DEA for an undercover assignment on the West Coast. Benson subsequently persuaded Rollins to return to SVU in his place.

== Main characters ==
| Portrayed by | Character | Position | Seasons | | | | | | | | | | | | | | | | | | | | | | | | | | | |
| Portrayed by | Character | Position | 1 | 2 | 3 | 4 | 5 | 6 | 7 | 8 | 9 | 10 | 11 | 12 | 13 | 14 | 15 | 16 | 17 | 18 | 19 | 20 | 21 | 22 | 23 | 24 | 25 | 26 | 27 | 28 |
|---|---|---|---|---|---|---|---|---|---|---|---|---|---|---|---|---|---|---|---|---|---|---|---|---|---|---|---|---|---|---|
| Christopher Meloni | Elliot Stabler | Sr. Detective (S1–12) | Main | Main | Main | Main | Main | Main | Main | Main | Main | Main | Main | Main | | | | | | | | | | Recurring | Recurring | Recurring | Guest | Guest | Guest | Guest |
| Mariska Hargitay | Olivia Benson | Jr. Detective (S1–12); Sr. Detective (S13–15); Sergeant (S15–17); Lieutenant (S17–21); Captain (S21–) | Main | Main | Main | Main | Main | Main | Main | Main | Main | Main | Main | Main | Main | Main | Main | Main | Main | Main | Main | Main | Main | Main | Main | Main | Main | Main | Main | Main |
| Richard Belzer | John Munch | Sr. Detective (S1–8); Sergeant (S9–15) | Main | Main | Main | Main | Main | Main | Main | Main | Main | Main | Main | Main | Main | Main | Main | | G | | | | | | | | | | | |
| Dann Florek | Donald Cragen | Captain (S1–15) | Main | Main | Main | Main | Main | Main | Main | Main | Main | Main | Main | Main | Main | Main | Main | G | | | | | | | G | | | | G | |
| Michelle Hurd | Monique Jeffries | Jr. Detective | M | M | | | | | | | | | | | | | | | | | | | | | | | | | | |
| Stephanie March | Alexandra Cabot | Assistant DA | | Main | Main | Main | Main | G | | | | R | M | | R | | | | | | G | | | | | | | | | |
| Ice-T | Fin Tutuola | Jr. Detective (S2–8); Sr. Detective (S9–19); Sergeant (S19–) | | Main | Main | Main | Main | Main | Main | Main | Main | Main | Main | Main | Main | Main | Main | Main | Main | Main | Main | Main | Main | Main | Main | Main | Main | Main | Main | Main |
| BD Wong | George Huang | Psychiatrist (S2–15) | | R | R | Main | Main | Main | Main | Main | Main | Main | Main | Main | Guest | Guest | Guest | | G | | | | | | | | | | G | |
| Diane Neal | Casey Novak | Assistant DA | | | | | Main | Main | Main | Main | Main | | | G | R | | | | | | | | | | | | | | | |
| Tamara Tunie | Melinda Warner | Chief Medical Examiner | | Recurring | Recurring | Recurring | Recurring | Recurring | Main | Main | Main | Main | Main | Main | Recurring | Recurring | Recurring | Recurring | Recurring | | G | | Guest | Guest | Guest | | | | | |
| Adam Beach | Chester Lake | Jr. Detective | | | | | | | | R | M | | | | | | | | | | | | | | | | | | | |
| Michaela McManus | Kim Greylek | Assistant DA | | | | | | | | | | M | | | | | | | | | | | | | | | | | | |
| Danny Pino | Nick Amaro | Jr. Detective | | | | | | | | | | | | | Main | Main | Main | Main | | | | | | | G | | | | | |
| Kelli Giddish | Amanda Rollins | Jr. Detective (S13–21); Sr. Detective (S21–24); Sergeant (S26-) | | | | | | | | | | | | | Main | Main | Main | Main | Main | Main | Main | Main | Main | Main | Main | Main | G | R | M | M |
| Raúl Esparza | Rafael Barba | Assistant DA (S14–19); Defense Attorney (S21–23) | | | | | | | | | | | | | | R | Main | Main | Main | Main | Main | | Guest | Guest | Guest | | | | | |
| Peter Scanavino | Dominick Carisi | Jr. Detective (S16–20); Assistant DA (S21–) | | | | | | | | | | | | | | | | Main | Main | Main | Main | Main | Main | Main | Main | Main | Main | Main | Main | Main |
| Philip Winchester | Peter Stone | Assistant DA | | | | | | | | | | | | | | | | | | | M | M | | | | | | | | |
| Jamie Gray Hyder | Katriona Tamin | Officer (S21–22); Jr. Detective (S22–23) | | | | | | | | | | | | | | | | | | | | | Main | Main | Main | | | | | |
| Demore Barnes | Christian Garland | Deputy Chief | | | | | | | | | | | | | | | | | | | | | R | M | M | | | | | |
| Octavio Pisano | Joe Velasco | Jr. Detective (S23–26); Sr. Detective (S26–27) | | | | | | | | | | | | | | | | | | | | | | | Main | Main | Main | Main | Main | |
| Molly Burnett | Grace Muncy | Jr. Detective | | | | | | | | | | | | | | | | | | | | | | | | M | | | | |
| Kevin Kane | Terry Bruno | Jr. Detective | | | | | | | | | | | | | | | | | | | | | | | | R | R | Main | Main | Main |
| Juliana Aidén Martinez | Kate Silva | Jr. Detective | | | | | | | | | | | | | | | | | | | | | | | | | | M | | |
| Aimé Donna Kelly | Renee Curry | Captain | | | | | | | | | | | | | | | | | | | | | | G | G | | R | R | M | M |
| Corey Cott | Jake Griffin | Jr. Detective | | | | | | | | | | | | | | | | | | | | | | | | | | | M | M |

== Police ==
=== Elliot Stabler ===
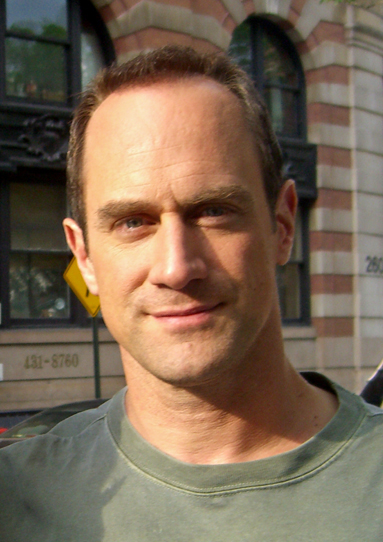
Elliot Stabler was portrayed by Christopher Meloni from 1999 to 2011. He has since reprised the role on his new spin-off, Law and Order: Organized Crime, and is now recurring on SVU.

- Portrayed by Christopher Meloni
- Episodes: "Payback" – "Smoked", "Return of the Prodigal Son" – present

Elliot Stabler is a senior detective who previously worked in Manhattan's 16th Precinct, also known as the Special Victims Unit, which investigates sex crimes. He is one of the original members of the squad. A former Marine and a dedicated detective, he has a 97 percent closure rate, but his dedication can turn to obsession and cause him to take cases personally. His dedication to the job also makes him the target for several IAB investigations during the course of his 19-year career at SVU. At the start of the series, he is married with four children. He separates from his wife Kathy during seasons 7 and 8, but they reconcile after she becomes pregnant with their fifth child. Elliot is Catholic, which sometimes complicates the cases he works on, but also helps him form a close friendship with ADA Novak. His partner is Olivia Benson, with whom he generally has a good working relationship, but it is not without tension and friction, especially in seasons 7 and 8 when they are separated as partners for some time. Captain Cragen makes both detectives speak with psychiatrist Rebecca Hendrix in order to decide whether they can continue working as partners. Hendrix tells Cragen that he should split them up only if he wants to lose his two best detectives.

Stabler abruptly retires from the Special Victims Unit after he shoots and kills a teenage girl who was recklessly firing a gun in the squad room. He is not seen or heard from again until the episode "Return of the Prodigal Son," where it is revealed he has been working as an international liaison for the NYPD working to take down organized crime since having come out of retirement in 2017. He eventually joins the Organized Crime Control Bureau after Kathy is murdered by gangster Richard Wheatley.

=== Olivia Benson ===
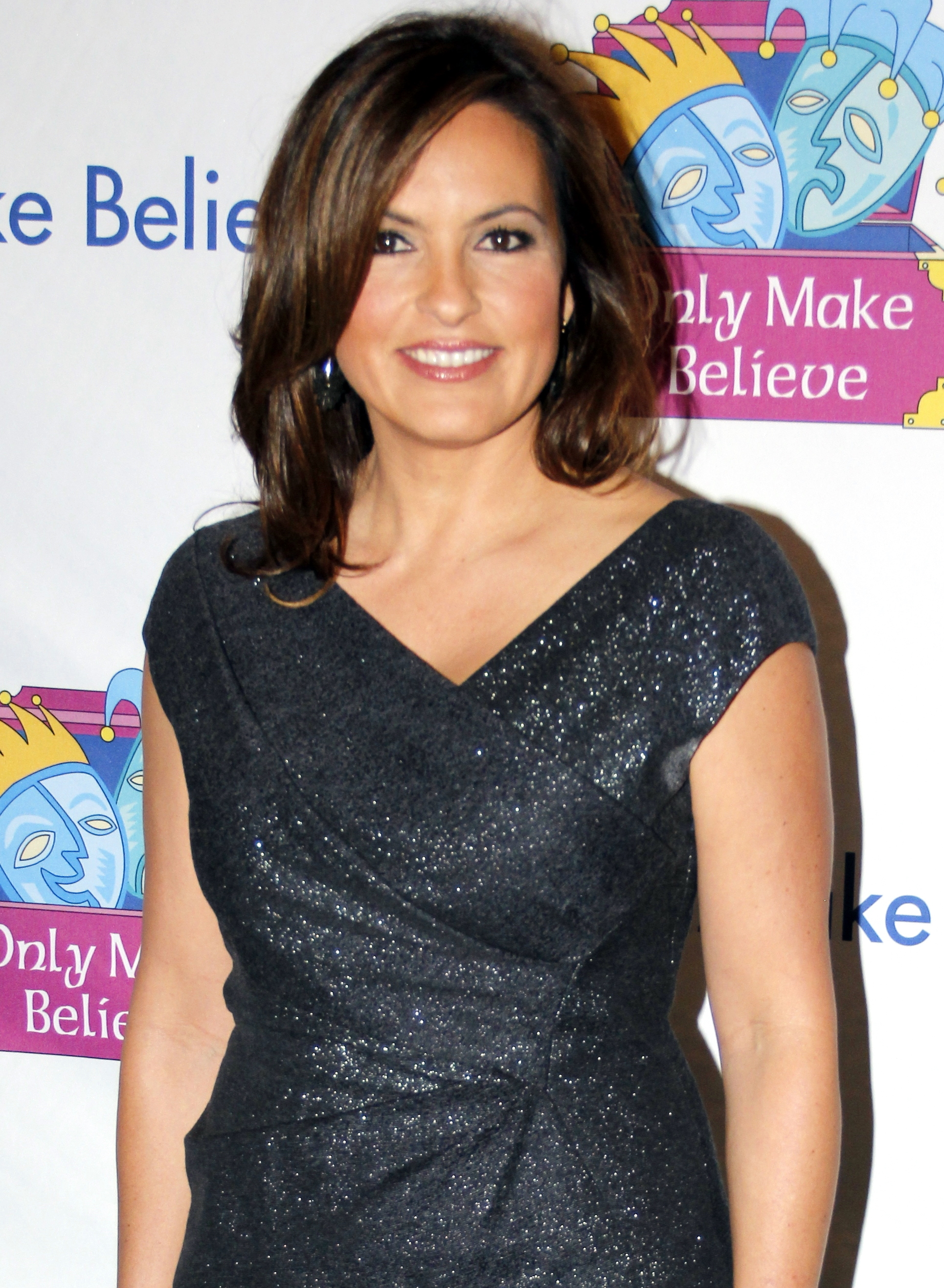
Olivia Benson has been portrayed by Mariska Hargitay since 1999.

- Portrayed by Mariska Hargitay
- Episodes: "Payback" – present

Olivia Benson is the Captain of the Manhattan Special Victims Unit, which investigates sex crimes. She was primarily partnered with Elliot Stabler, until he retired after season 12. She is tough, empathetic, and completely dedicated to her job, to the point that she is sometimes seen as having little personal life. Her dedication sometimes wreaks havoc on her emotional state as she empathizes with victims of sexual assault, having been the child of rape and later the victim of sexual assault while undercover in season 9. She has allowed her compassion for victims of abuse to sometimes cloud her professional judgment and impede her ability to remain impartial. Hargitay has received both a Golden Globe and an Emmy Award for her portrayal of Benson.

In season 13, Detectives Benson and Tutuola are the senior detectives in the precinct. Throughout the first few episodes of season 13, she struggles to cope with the retirement of Stabler. She is more harsh and argumentative, as seen when she berates ADA Novak for "losing her nerve" after Novak says that Benson is "off". Her primary partner from seasons 13 to 14 is Nick Amaro, but she is also seen at times working with Tutuola and Detectives Amanda Rollins and Dominick "Sonny" Carisi.

Upon the retirement of Sergeant Munch at the beginning of season 15, Captain Cragen recommends to her that she should take the sergeant's exam, as she is now his second in command. In the episode "Rapist Anonymous", she makes the announcement that she has passed the exam, officially making her a sergeant. After Cragen's retirement, she becomes acting commanding officer of SVU until she is subsequently promoted to lieutenant in season 17 and officially takes command of the unit. At the end of season 15, she became a foster mother to Noah Porter, formally adopting him at the end of season 16.

She is taken hostage midway through season 17 ("Townhouse Incident"), but is rescued unharmed. Shortly thereafter, she begins a relationship with IAB Captain Ed Tucker.

Benson is promoted to Captain at the end of the season 21 opener ("I'm Going to Make You a Star").

=== John Munch ===
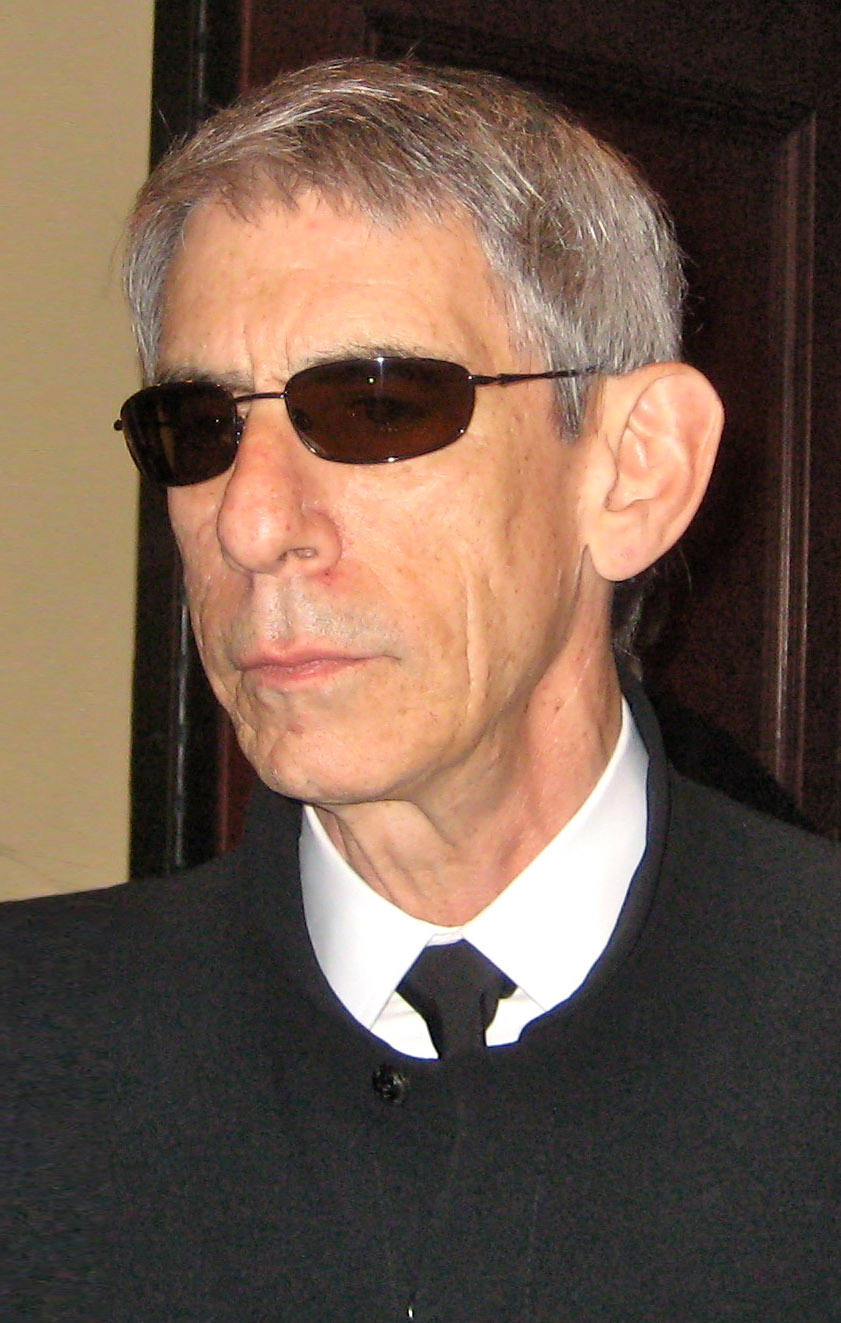
John Munch was portrayed by Richard Belzer from 1993 to 2016 in both Homicide: Life on the Streets, and L&O: Special Victims Unit.

- Portrayed by Richard Belzer
- Episodes: "Payback" – "Wonderland Story", "Spring Awakening", "Fashionable Crimes".

John Munch is a detective, and later a sergeant in the Manhattan Special Victims Unit. A conspiracy theorist and dedicated detective, Munch is first partnered with Brian Cassidy (Dean Winters), whom he thinks of as a kind of younger brother, alternately poking fun at him and imparting (often questionable) advice on life and women. When Cassidy leaves the precinct in 2000, Munch is briefly partnered with Monique Jeffries (Michelle Hurd), and then with Odafin Tutuola (Ice-T). He and the gruff, uncompromising Tutuola get off to a rough start, but gradually come to like and respect each other.

After being promoted to Sergeant at the beginning of season 9, Munch takes more of a leadership role and does less investigating in the field, partially due to the fact that Tutuola is partnered with Detective Lake in season 9. After Lake's departure in the season 9 finale, Munch begins working with Tutuola again, while occasionally acting as squad commander when Cragen is unavailable. In season 13, Munch is seen mostly in the precinct helping with interrogations and research, as Tutuola is partnered with Detective Rollins. He continues to act as squad commander when Cragen is absent. In season 14, Munch is temporarily reassigned to the Cold Case Unit, after solving a decade old cold child abduction case in the episode, "Manhattan Vigil". He returns to SVU in the episode, "Secrets Exhumed", in which he brings back a 1980s rape-homicide cold case for the squad to look into. Munch files his retirement papers after the events in the episode "American Tragedy", formally leaving in "Wonderland Story". He subsequently accepts a position at the District Attorney's office as an investigator. Fin mentioned that Munch returned to Baltimore after remarrying and opening a bar. In the premiere episode of the series' 25th season, Munch is mentioned as having died, coinciding with Belzer's death in 2023.

The character was first created for the NBC police drama Homicide: Life on the Street, where he worked as a homicide detective with the Baltimore Police Department. The character was based on Jay Landsman, a central figure in David Simon's true crime book Homicide: A Year on the Killing Streets, a documentary account of the homicide unit's operation over one year. After the series' cancellation in 1999, the character was transferred to Law and Order: Special Victims Unit, having appeared within the original Law & Order in cross-over episodes. Within the series, it is eventually said he left Baltimore after his wife cheated on him with a friend. Munch has been the only fictional character played by a single actor to appear on eight different television shows: Homicide: Life on the Street, Law & Order, Law & Order: Special Victims Unit, Law & Order: Trial by Jury, The X-Files, Arrested Development, The Beat, and The Wire. He is also mentioned in British TV series Luther.

=== Donald Cragen ===
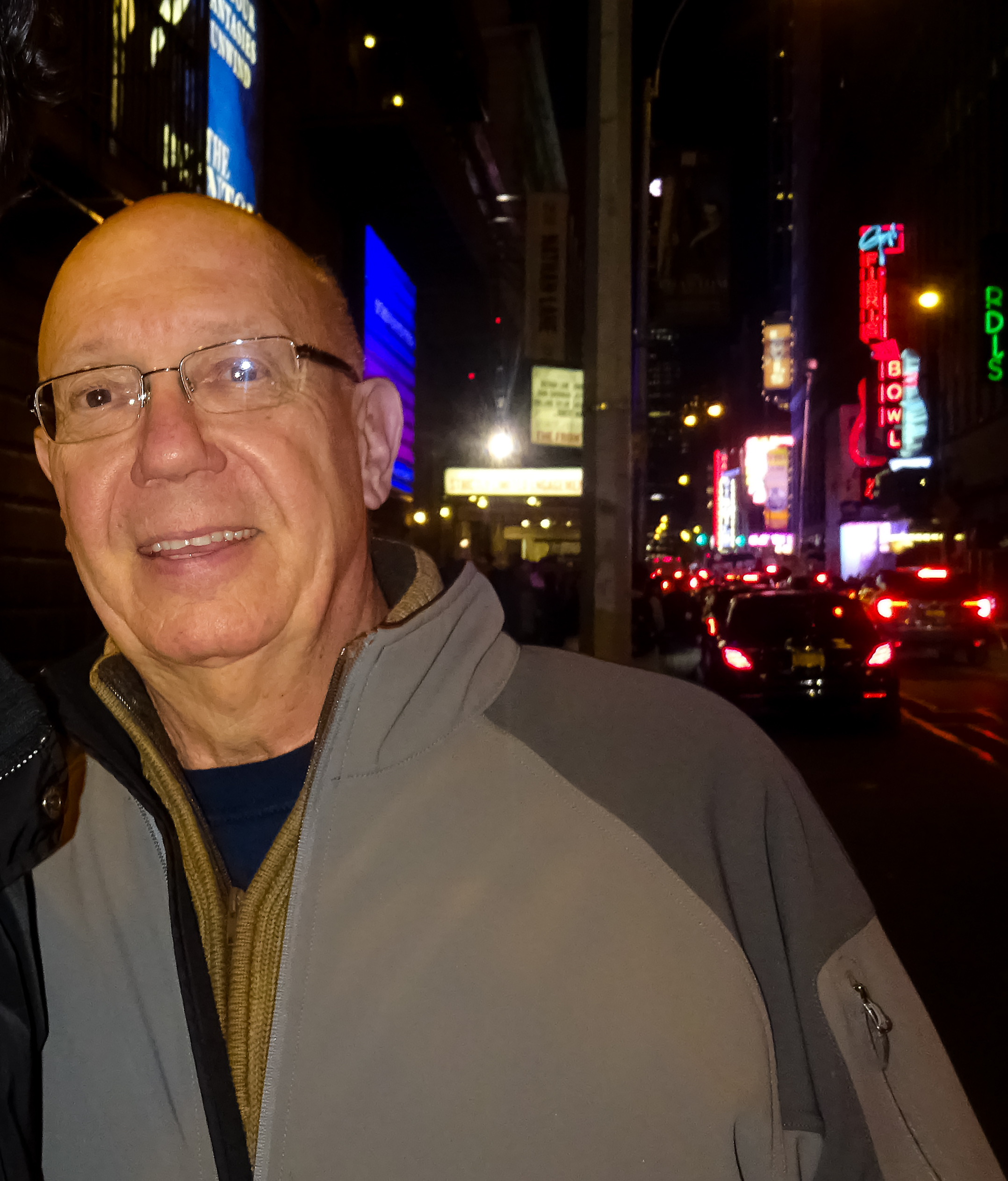
Donald Cragen was portrayed by Dann Florek from 1999 to 2014 and 2015.

- Portrayed by Dann Florek
- Episodes: "Payback" – "Amaro's One-Eighty", "Perverted Justice", "The Five Hundredth Episode"

Donald Cragen is the Captain of the Special Victims Unit. Florek originally portrayed the character from 1990 to 1993 in the original Law & Order series. During his Law & Order tenure, Cragen is investigated by internal affairs for corruption. During the investigation to prove his innocence, he discovers that he was being framed by his former captain and mentor, whom he turns in and is cleared by IAB. He was an alcoholic for much of his early career, but goes sober after pulling his service revolver on a taxi driver in a drunken rage. He has remained sober since, even after the death of his wife in a plane crash. Cragen was written out of Law & Order in 1993, as he is transferred to Anti-Corruption Task Force, occasionally making guest appearances on the show. The character was brought back full-time in 1999 to be the Captain of the Special Victims Unit. As SVU Commanding Officer, he is portrayed as a somewhat stern but understanding father figure to the detectives who work under him, often giving them a great deal of leniency because he trusts their ability to get results. Cragen departs at the end of "Amaro's One-Eighty" after his girlfriend Eileen gets two tickets for a six-month cruise around the world and he decides to use his unused leave time to carry him through until June, when he is set to hit the mandatory retirement age. In the Season 27 premiere, it is revealed that Captain Cragen has died.

=== Monique Jeffries ===
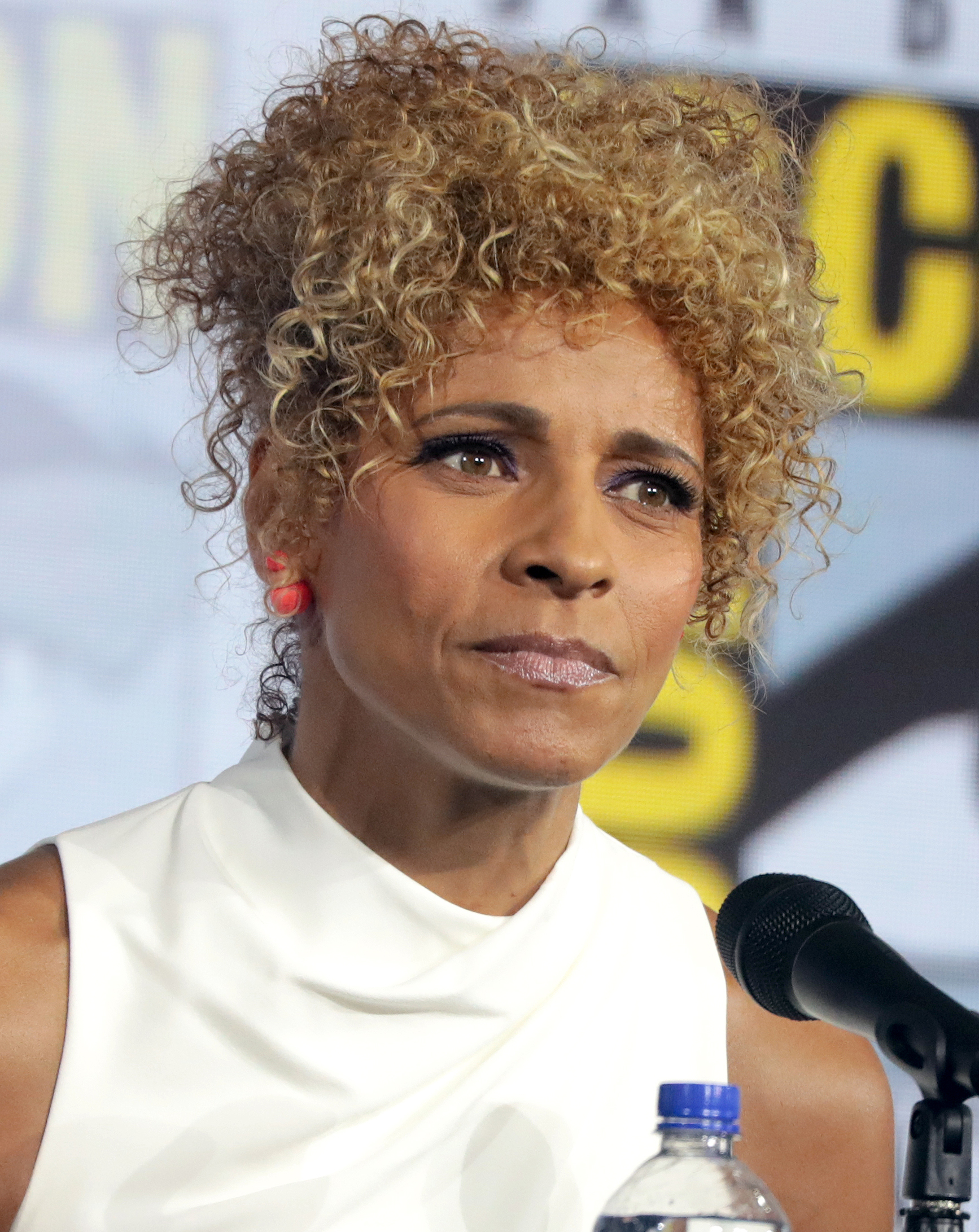
Monique Jeffries was portrayed by Michelle Hurd from 1999 to 2001.

- Portrayed by Michelle Hurd
- Episodes: "Payback" – "Runaway"

Monique Jeffries is a police detective with Manhattan's Special Victims Unit and one of the initial detectives in the SVU squad. Earlier in the series, she is partnered with various detectives, including Brian Cassidy. Initially, she is only seen at headquarters, doing research and showing up in court for various cases to represent the department. After Cassidy's departure in the middle of the first season, she partners with Detective Munch and begins going out on investigations. Shortly after this, she is physically and emotionally shaken when a van explodes while she is pursuing a fleeing suspect. Survival of the incident leaves her feeling "restless", and she has a one night stand with a man she recognizes as a suspect in a previous sexual assault case the unit had investigated. After she confesses this to a department psychiatrist, who is working for a commission investigating problems in various police units, she is taken off active duty and ordered to receive treatment. Captain Don Cragen, feeling she has become "reckless" and "a danger" to herself supports the decision. At the end of the season 2 premiere episode, Detective Fin Tutuola shows up at the SVU precinct, and Jeffries asks if she can help him. Upon reading the folder Tutuola gives her, she realizes he is there to take her job. Finding desk duty intolerable, she cleans out her desk and leaves her gun and badge on the desk of Captain Cragen. In the second season, although she is shown in three episodes, it is revealed that she was reinstated and transferred to the Vice Unit.

=== Fin Tutuola ===
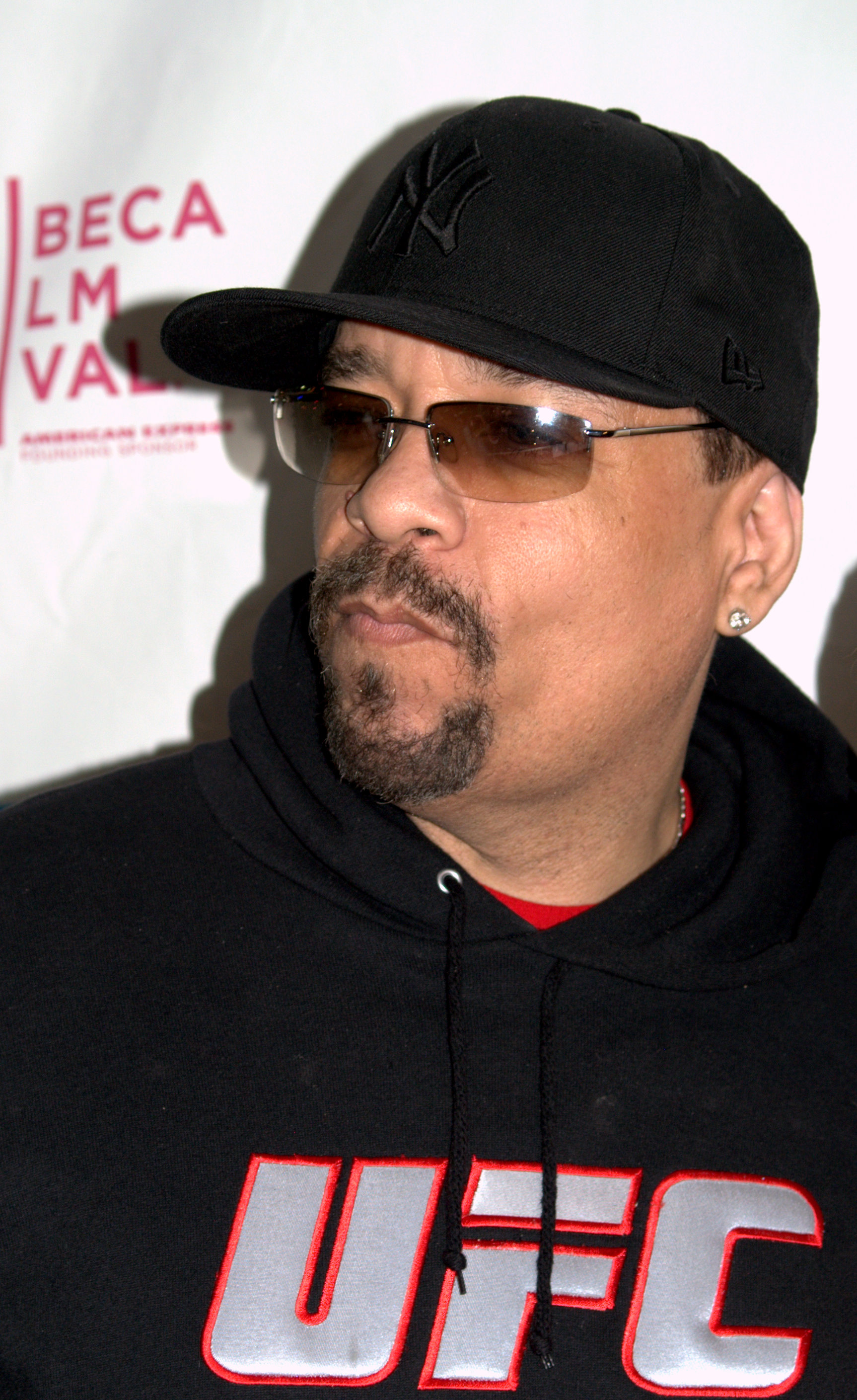
Fin Tutuola has been portrayed by Ice-T since 2000.

- Portrayed by Ice-T
- Episodes: "Wrong is Right" – present

Odafin "Fin" Tutuola is a sergeant in the Manhattan Special Victims Unit. He was raised in Harlem and he served in the United States Army, where he saw combat in Mogadishu. A former undercover narcotics detective, Tutuola replaces Monique Jeffries after she leaves the squad in 2000. He transfers out of Narcotics after his partner was shot. He initially has a rocky relationship with his colleagues in SVU, especially his partner John Munch and Olivia Benson. He sees the world in black and white, with all criminals equally deserving of prison regardless of extenuating circumstances. He also keeps a tight rein on his emotions, refusing to talk about his problems or to admit that the grisly nature of his work often affects him. He rarely talks about his personal life, not revealing he has a son to his fellow detectives until the sixth season. As the series progresses, he becomes closer with Munch and even saves Benson from being raped while they are both undercover in season 9. However, he also begins clashing more frequently with fellow detective Elliot Stabler. As of the season 8 episode "Screwed", he is assigned Chester Lake as his new partner. After Lake kills a suspect, Stabler accuses Tutuola of tipping him off before he is taken into custody and checks his phone records. Tutuola admits he called Lake but says he did not expect him to run. Stabler quasi-apologizes for not trusting him, but Tutuola dismisses his apology because he believes Stabler will always be the same "bulldog". Afterwards, he requests a transfer from the squad, however the man in charge of transfers is a former colleague of Tutuola's who holds a grudge against him. Tutuola resigns himself to being "stuck" and his captain, Don Cragen, orders him to investigate a case with Stabler, who he calls a "headcase" and "cranky-balls". As time passes, Tutuola again warms to Stabler, a point proven in the season 11 episode "Solitary", when a suspect throws Stabler off a roof, Tutuola nearly throttles the suspect for attacking his "friend".

After Lake's departure at the end of season 9, Tutuola is again partnered with Sergeant Munch from seasons 10 to 12, sometimes working alone or with Benson and Stabler when Munch is unavailable. Beginning in season 13, Tutuola's primary partner is Detective Rollins until her departure in Season 24.

=== Chester Lake ===
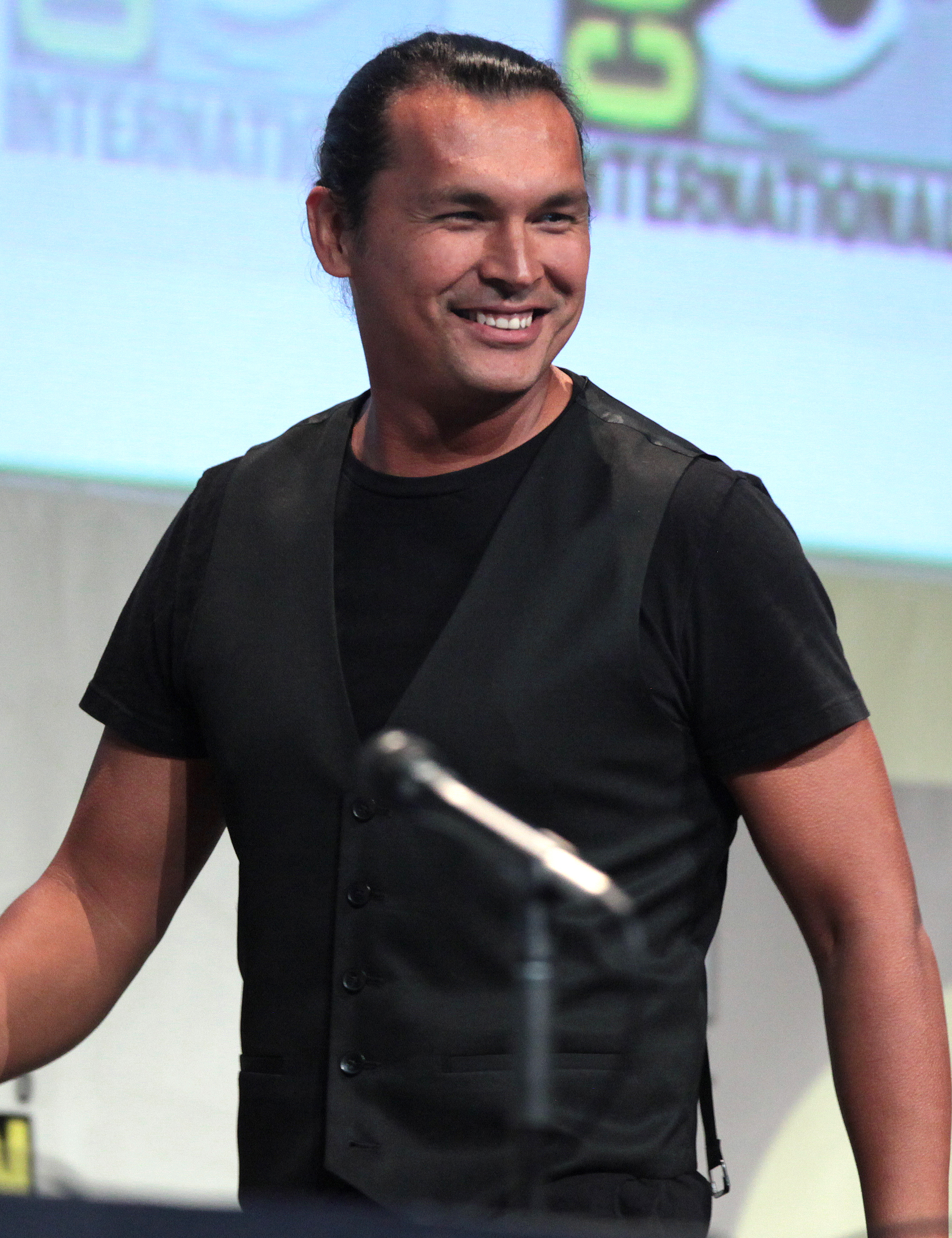
Chester Lake was portrayed by Adam Beach from 2007 to 2008.

- Portrayed by Adam Beach
- Episodes: "Outsider", "Screwed", "Alternate" – "Cold"

Detective Chester Lake transfers to the Manhattan SVU from the Brooklyn Special Victims Unit at the end of the eighth season and is partnered with Detective Fin Tutuola. He is of Native American ancestry, specifically Mohawk, and speaks proudly of his ancestors, noting that many of them helped to build the city's skyscrapers and subway tunnels. He also used to compete as an amateur mixed martial artist under the name "Naptime", but quit after tearing his ACL. Lake suffers from insomnia and often takes walks at night when he cannot sleep.

In the final episode of the ninth season, Lake begins attending meetings of individuals in Philadelphia who share information on "cold" murder cases. He later shoots and kills a fellow police officer, who was suspected of raping two illegal immigrant girls ten years ago, killing one. Lake disappears while his fellow detectives investigate. They are able to prove Lake killed the other cop in self defense after he was shot at himself by a second NYPD officer with a history of brutality. Lake is found, wounded, and taken to the hospital. The second officer, however, is released after the jury deadlocks. The officer is killed the same night and Lake is found standing over the body and makes no denial to his fellow SVU detectives. He is arrested and last seen in the series sitting handcuffed in a police car. It was confirmed on April 18, 2008, that Beach would not be returning to the series to reprise the role in the subsequent season.

=== Amanda Rollins ===
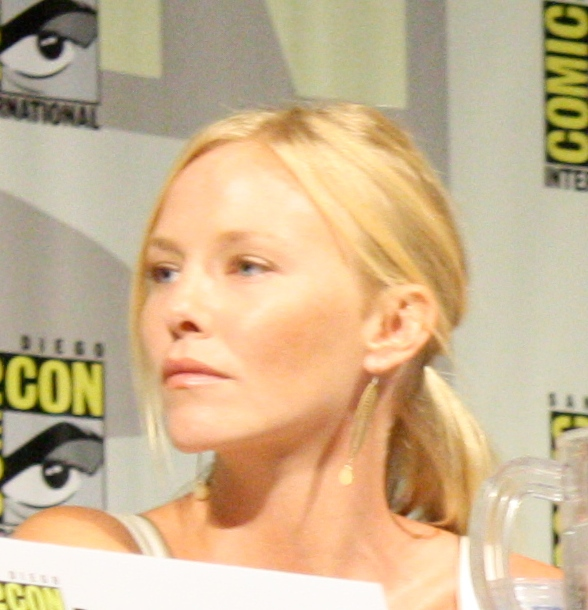
Amanda Rollins has been portrayed by Kelli Giddish from 2011 to 2022.

- Portrayed by Kelli Giddish
- Episodes: "Scorched Earth" – "And a Trauma in a Pear Tree", "All Pain Is One Malady", "Tunnel Blind"

Amanda Rollins is a detective from Atlanta, Georgia, who moves to New York City to join the Special Victims Unit. Rollins appears to be a detective who is very anxious to do her job, often being told not to get ahead of herself by Detectives Benson and Amaro, and Captain Cragen. She appears to have a good rapport with her partner, Detective Tutuola, compared to his last new partner, Chester Lake. Shortly after transferring to NYC, Rollins deals with a serial rapist case that has a familiar twist for her. Rollins tries to prove to Benson and Amaro that the rapist originated in Atlanta and has come to New York for new prey, almost falling victim to him in an attempt to flush him out, since he has a preference to blonde and athletic women. When Rollins becomes distraught over a case where an actress is raped by one of the men in her life, Rollins asks Benson how she can trust any man after working this job. Benson reassures Rollins and tells her that she trusts her partner.

As for Rollins' personal life, little is mentioned of her off-duty life (although, being from Atlanta, she is a fan of the Braves, whose schedule she keeps on her refrigerator door); Amanda has mentioned that she has a sister, Kim, who has had psychotic and drug issues. Kim has also suffered repeated abuse by her ex-boyfriend. Rollins says that while she was working in Atlanta, there was an accident that occurred that allowed for her to transfer to the SVU. Amanda is exposed as a heavy gambler in the episode "Home Invasions". When Cragen discovers her problem, he threatens to take her badge, but decides to help instead—since he is a recovering alcoholic—by requiring her to attend Gamblers Anonymous meetings. Rollins' troubled sister, Kim (Lindsay Pulsipher), comes to New York in the season 14 episode, "Friending Emily", causing problems for Amanda while she is trying to work a case. Later in the episode "Deadly Ambition", Kim returns to New York beaten by her ex-boyfriend Jeff and claiming to be pregnant. When Amanda hears screams from inside her apartment, she finds Kim's ex-boyfriend attempting to rape Kim, and Amanda shoots and kills the man as he pulls a gun on her. The supposed evidence of Amanda shooting Jeff in cold blood leads to Lt. Tucker arresting Amanda in Captain Cragen's office. The charges against Amanda are later dropped when Amaro tapes Kim confessing to setting Amanda up for a life insurance policy on Jeff. Before Kim can be arrested, however, she steals everything from Amanda's apartment and disappears. In the episode "Poisoned Motive", Rollins is shot by a sniper in front of the precinct. Her shooting leads back to the daughter of Detective Tutuola's narcotics partner, who is out for revenge on the NYPD after her father was injured on the job by protecting Tutuola from a bullet.

In the season 15 episode "Rapist Anonymous", Rollins is caught in the middle of a case in which her friend from Georgia claims to have been raped. When the alleged rapist is killed, her friend is put on trial and Rollins' personal life is revealed on the stand. This proves too much for her to handle and she is seen gambling, smoking, and drinking in the final scene. Later in season 15, she frequents an illegal casino ("Gambler's Fallacy") and is exposed as a cop by a 15-year-old waitress whom Rollins and Benson assisted in an earlier episode. The operators of the illegal casino threaten to out Rollins to Benson, and although Rollins comes clean to Fin, Benson is still outraged. Rollins eventually breaks up an art theft ring with the help of Lt. Declan Murphy, who was undercover as one of the casino operators.

In the season 16 episode "Forgiving Rollins", it is revealed Rollins was raped by her commanding officer in Atlanta, Deputy Chief Charles Patton (Harry Hamlin), in 2010. This comes to light when Patton is in New York for a conference and is accused of rape by one of his APD detectives, Reese Taymor (Dreama Walker), at a Manhattan hotel.

Rollins is revealed to be pregnant in the two-part season 17 opener when she is interviewing serial killer Dr. Gregory Yates (Dallas Roberts). The father is revealed to be Declan Murphy, who came back to New York during Super Bowl weekend 2015 to infiltrate a sex trafficking ring. Rollins undergoes a difficult pregnancy before giving birth to a healthy baby girl, Jesse. Giddish was pregnant in real life and gave birth to a boy in October 2015.

In season 20, Rollins becomes pregnant again, this time by cardiologist Al Pollack. She gives birth to another girl, Billie Mabel, but declines Dr. Pollack's marriage proposal because she doesn't love him.

In the season 22 finale, she and Carisi kiss. In the season 23 premiere, it is revealed that she and Carisi are dating, and eventually get married in mid season 24. In season 27, Rollins returns to the Special Victims Unit, filling the spots left vacant by the departures of Detectives Kate Silva and Joe Velasco.

=== Nick Amaro ===
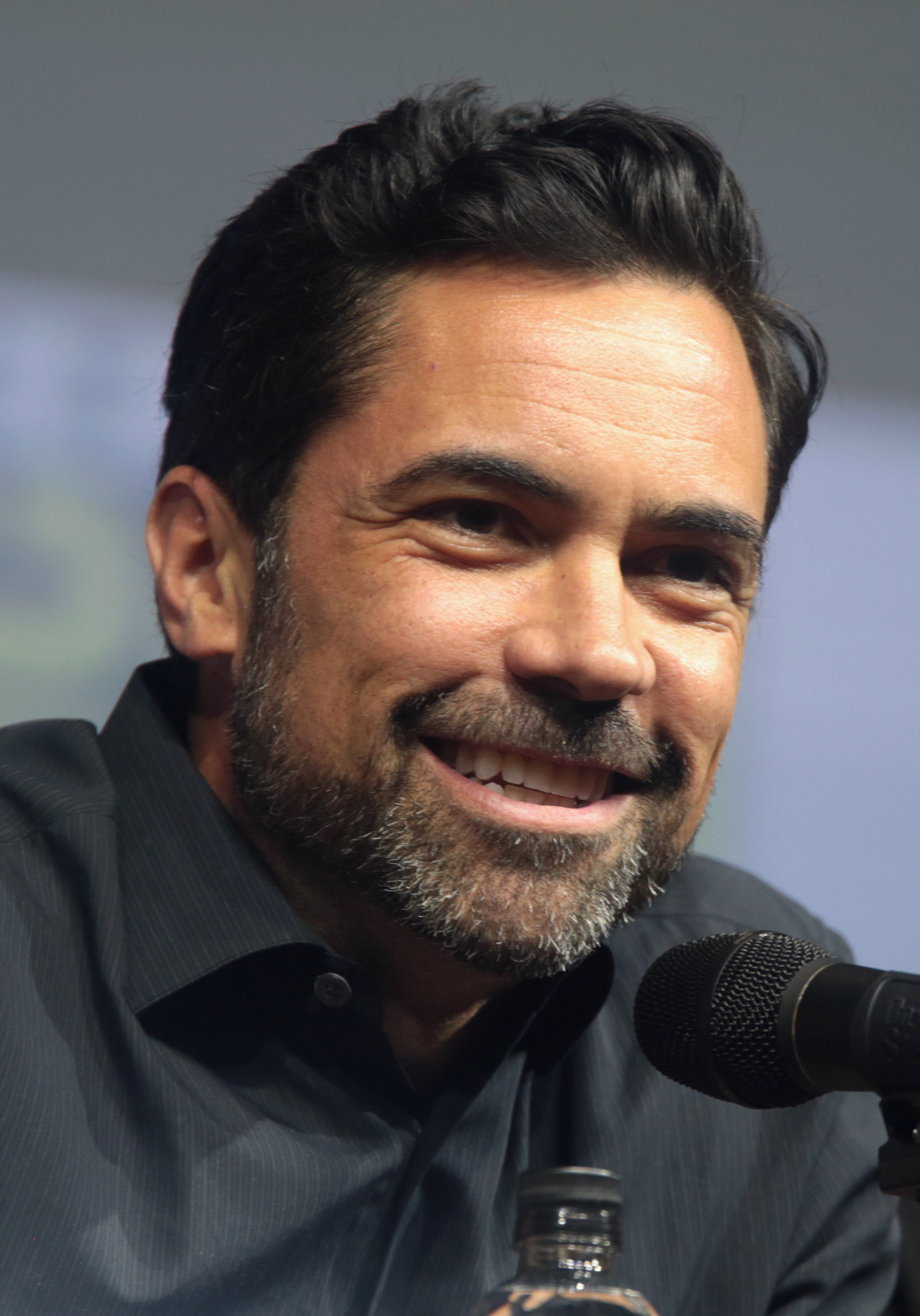
Nick Amaro was portrayed by Danny Pino from 2011 to 2015.

- Portrayed by Danny Pino
- Episodes: "Personal Fouls" – "Surrendering Noah", "The Five Hundredth Episode"

Nicolas Fiorello "Nick" Amaro, Jr. is a NYPD detective who has transferred to the Special Victims Unit from Warrants and Narcotics. When Nick was little, Amaro's father beat his mother. Nick's father later fled to Miami, Florida; he attributes his firm belief in divorce to this. He is fluent in Spanish, is married, with a young daughter named Zara, and has a living mother, Cesaria (Nancy Ticotin). His wife, Maria Grazie Amaro (Laura Benanti), is doing overseas reporting in Iraq. Since Maria has been deployed in Iraq, their relationship is somewhat tense, although they always seem to work through their differences.

Initially, Amaro does not see eye to eye with his new partner, Detective Benson, mainly because she is adjusting to having him as a partner instead of Elliot Stabler. After their rocky start, Amaro and Benson begin to have a mutual respect for each other and work well together. During his early days in SVU, Amaro has a tough time adjusting to the cases and tells Benson he has the urge to physically assault a suspect, but she tells him the better solution would be to ensure that the perpetrators never see the light of day. In the episode "Hunting Ground", Amaro saves Detective Benson and a kidnapped victim by shooting and killing a man. He is seen visibly shaken as it is his first kill shot. In the episode "Valentine's Day", he sees his wife go into an apartment of a man he does not know. In "Street Revenge", while trying to work a case of vigilante justice, he shadows his wife to see where she goes during the day; he later gets into a heated argument with his wife at the SVU squad room (after going to Philadelphia and assaulting a military friend of hers), and she tells him she is seeing a psychiatrist because she is trying to adapt back into her old life.

In the season 14 premiere, Amaro's wife decides to take a job in Washington, D.C., citing that they need a break from each other. Amaro is clearly rattled by this and goes as far as to threaten to shoot Detective Brian Cassidy if Cassidy does not tell him for whom he was working undercover. This, along with his erratic behavior, causes the SVU detectives to be very cautious around him with sensitive information regarding Captain Cragen's case. In "Twenty-Five Acts", Amaro seeks temporary SVU commanding officer, Captain Harris (Adam Baldwin), to let Amaro work their rape case solo, telling Benson that she needs a partner she can trust, Benson working the case with Rollins.

In the episode "Undercover Blue", Detective Cassidy is put on trial for rape while he was undercover. Amaro is called to the stand by ADA Derek Strauss and he is asked questions about his undercover work. When Cassidy's lawyer questions him, he is forced to reveal that he had a romantic relationship with the sister of a drug lord he was investigating undercover. Munch then informs him that the NYPD brass is requesting he take a paternity test because the woman is claiming he has a son from the relationship. He goes to the woman's house to confront her, but is denied by her boyfriend. Later, while watching the boyfriend pick his alleged son up from school, he witnesses the man complete a drug deal using the boy. Amaro then meets the boy and tells the woman that her boyfriend is using their son to deal drugs. After Cassidy apologizes to Amaro for what his lawyer did, Cassidy helps Amaro bust the boyfriend for drug dealing. The episode concludes with Amaro knocking on the woman's door and her reluctantly letting him in.

Amaro begins to show great concern when Rollins begins gambling again, and they begin to get close. In the episode "Reasonable Doubt", he comes out of a shower in Rollins' apartment.

=== Katriona "Kat" Tamin ===
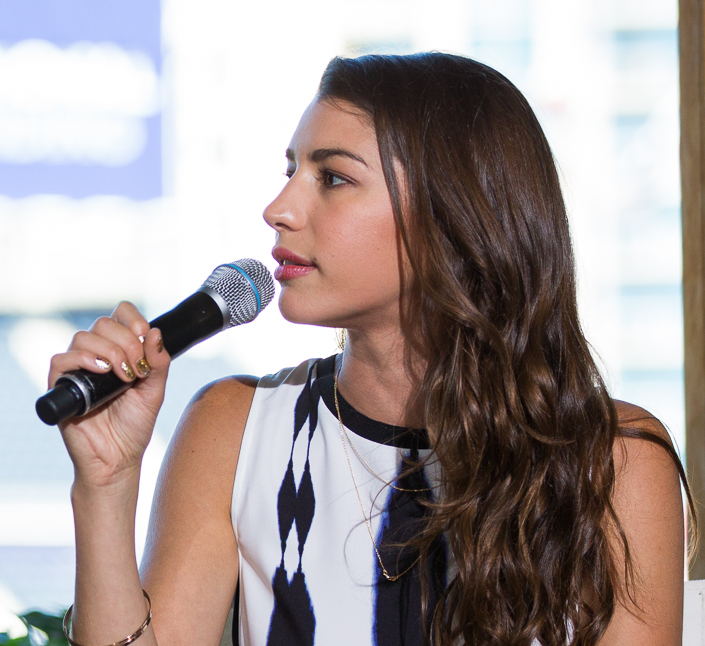
Katriona "Kat" Tamin was portrayed by Jamie Gray Hyder from 2019 to 2021.

- Portrayed by Jamie Gray Hyder
- Episodes: "I'm Going to Make You a Star" – "Never Turn Your Back on Them"

Detective Katriona "Kat" Tamin is introduced in the Season 21 premiere "I'm Going to Make You a Star". Having worked undercover with the NYPD Vice Unit, she is called on by Benson to assist SVU in building a case against an influential media mogul. In the later episode "The Burden of Our Choices", she transfers to Benson's squad as a detective-in-training and is placed under the supervision of Fin and Rollins. She sometimes acts recklessly and against orders, a pattern of behavior that concerns Benson.

Tamin is bisexual.

In Season 22, when Tutuola and Tamin were walking to celebrate with Sergeant Baker and Benson, he accidentally reveals that Kat has been promoted to Detective, and they are going to celebrate her promotion.

In September 2021, it was announced that Gray Hyder would leave the show after the two-hour premiere of season 23. After getting shot and nearly dying, Tamin realizes that SVU is too much for her and decides to resign.

=== Christian Garland ===
- Portrayed by Demore Barnes
- Episodes: "Down Low in Hell's Kitchen" – "Tangled Strands of Justice"

Christian Garland is career police officer and former Deputy Chief of the SVU, replacing William Dodds. In "Tangled Strands of Justice", he mentions joining the NYPD just months before the September 11 attacks. Like Stabler, he is a second-generation cop. He and his wife Lamai (Trian Long-Smith) have a daughter.

When he is first appointed Benson's superior in "Down Low In Hell's Kitchen", the other SVU detectives view him with suspicion as he appears to be too worried about politics. He wins their respect after he goes undercover (he fit the profile targeted by the rapist). His involvement in a highly controversial and sensitive case upsets many in the police force, especially the corrupt ones, leading him to become a target of the higher-ups. As a result, he resigns so he will be able to leave with his reputation intact and on his own terms. After his resignation, he becomes Deputy Mayor. He is reunited with his former colleagues at the SVU when he approaches them for help on a missing persons case from 2001.

=== Joe Velasco ===
- Portrayed by Octavio Pisano
- Episodes: "And the Empire Strikes Back" – "A Vicious Circle"

Detective Jose "Joe" Velasco is a detective reassigned to SVU by Tommy McGrath, the new chief of detectives, after Katriona Tamin's retirement. Velasco is originally from Puerto de Anapra, (Note: According to Season 23, episode 17, "Once Upon a Time in El Barrio.") a colonia in Ciudad Juárez, a Mexican city bordering El Paso, Texas. He grew up with a physically abusive father and ran with the wrong crowd. The local drug cartel recruited him but he could not go through with the initiation, which required him to commit murder. His local parish priest helped him and his mother immigrate to the United States to escape the cartel.

The character is first introduced in the season 23 premiere "And the Empire Strikes Back" when the SVU arrests him during a bust and discovers that he was undercover. In "The One You Feed", he meets Gang Unit Captain Mike Duarte during a joint investigation and Duarte attempts to recruit him after learning about his background. At the end of the episode, he tells Benson that he wishes to stay in SVU and is put in charge of training Muncy.

Velasco has a rough start after his permanent transfer to SVU due to the heinous nature of some of the crimes the unit regularly investigates. Benson comes to value him as a member of her team and he strikes up a friendship with the other detectives, as well as ADA Carisi. In season 24, he is invited to stand witness to Rollins and Carisi's civil marriage ceremony despite having only worked with them for a year. Like Carisi, he was raised and is a practicing Catholic and crimes involving church authorities particularly disgust him.

In July of 2025, NBC revealed that Velasco would not be returning for the 2025-2026 television season. Despite this, he appeared in the first three episodes of the twenty-seventh season. He was approached by the DEA due to his past connections with the cartel, and decided to resign from SVU to become an informant there.

=== Grace Muncy ===
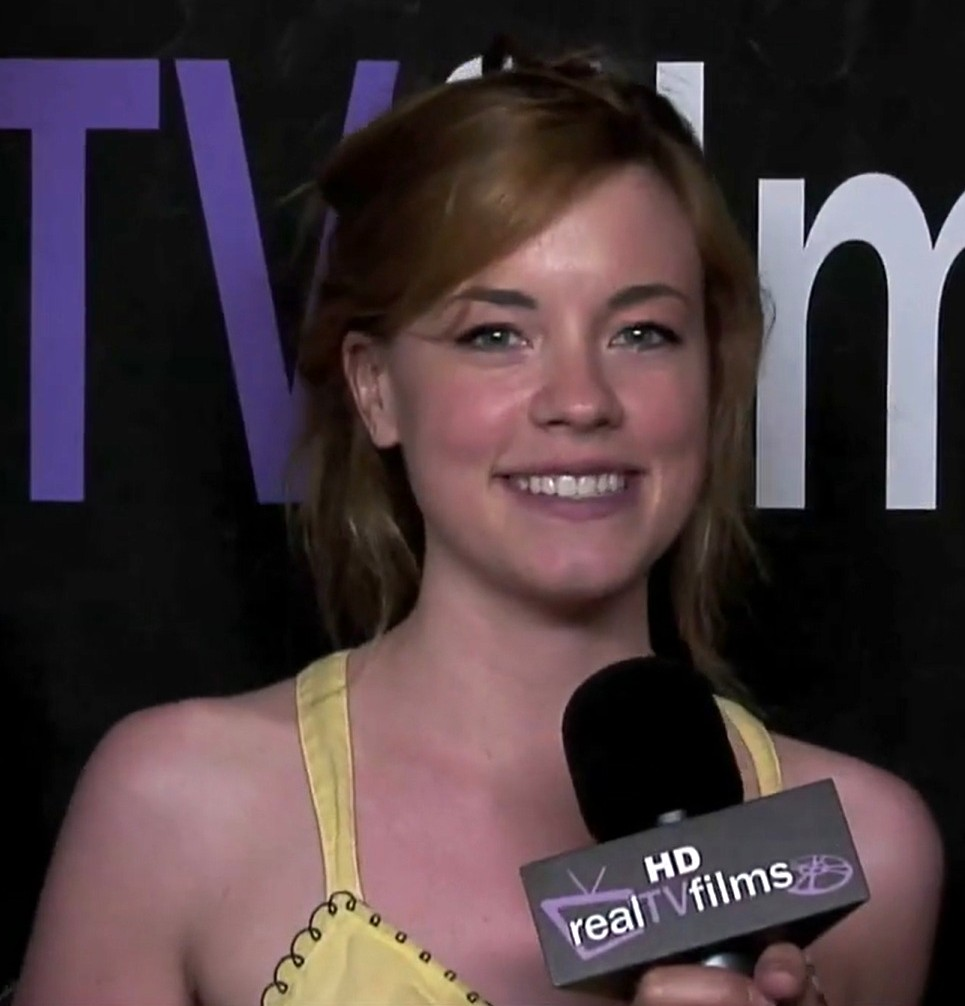
Molly Burnett portrayed Grace Muncy from 2022 to 2023.

- Portrayed by Molly Burnett
- Episodes: "The One You Feed" – "All Pain Is One Malady"

Detective Grace Muncy is an inexperienced detective from Captain Duarte's Gang Unit in the Bronx. She was the only white female detective and was rarely sent on undercover assignments since most gangs the unit dealt with were from ethnic minorities. Instead, she would be assigned to talk to witnesses or the gang members' girlfriends and spouses to get information, a skill on which Benson compliments her. When Duarte and Benson join forces due to a rape case involving a gang Duarte had already been investigating, Muncy is assigned to the SVU.

Muncy initially has a rough start at her new assignment due to her temper and overconfidence and she gets on the wrong side of Fin for leaving food in his car and returning it to him with an empty gas tank. In "And a Trauma in a Pear Tree", she is unable to keep her emotions in check during a cross-examination in court and her testimony is thrown out and the case declared a mistrial due to her outburst, earning her the ire of ADA Carisi. She becomes a permanent fixture in the SVU following Rollins' departure from the NYPD. Over time, she learns to keep her emotions in check and forms a friendship with Velasco, who Benson assigns to train her. They form a friendship, to the extent that in "The Presence Of Absence", she becomes extremely hostile towards Churlish after the latter reports Velasco for failing to follow protocol while interrogating a criminal.

She has a brother named Teddy, who was first mentioned in the episode "The One You Feed". He later becomes a suspect in a rape case that the SVU are investigating when Churlish runs into him during an undercover operation. In her introductory episode, she tells Benson that their mother left them a house in Queens but the siblings chose to rent their own place instead.

In the season 24 finale, she decides to leave the SVU to take a new job with the DEA.

=== Terry Bruno ===
- Portrayed by Kevin Kane
- Episodes: "Jumped In" – present

Detective Terrence "Terry" Bruno is a NYPD detective who was formerly part of the Bronx Special Victims Unit. He is an experienced detective and is often underestimated by other NYPD members due to the troubled history of the Bronx SVU.

When he was child, his parents held a cocktail party, where a divorced woman came into his room while he was half-undressed and sexually assaulted him in his bed. He kept it a secret for years before telling Benson. He was previously married to a firefighter named Rose, who kept Bruno's last name after the divorce.

He first teamed up with SVU when Benson was attacked by the gang BX9 under Oscar Pepa's orders. Tutola then requested that Bruno replace Rollins on the squad.

Kevin Kane was promoted to a series regular role starting with the twenty-sixth season.

=== Kate Silva ===
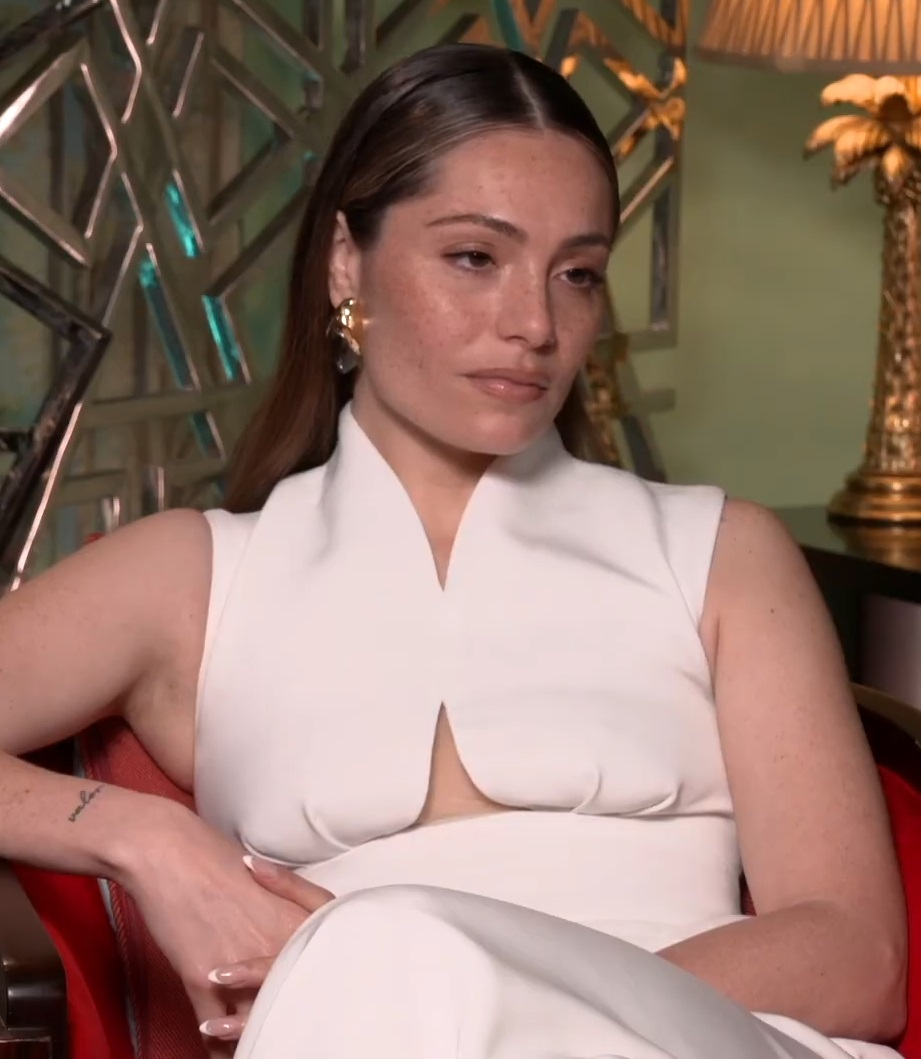
Juliana Aidén Martinez portrayed Kate Silva from 2024 to 2025.

- Portrayed by Juliana Aidén Martinez
- Episodes: "Fractured" – "Post Rage"

Kate Silva was formerly part of Brooklyn's Homicide division before joining SVU. One of her major cases involved a missing troubled teenage boy, Anthony Reed, who was found covered in the blood of a murder victim in a motel room next to where he was located. She was called in alongside Bruno when he was reported kidnapped by one of the support workers working in the group home where he lived and primarily helped close the case and find the criminal who abused Anthony and several other troubled teenage boys. Another one involved a teenage girl's nudes being distributed to other teenage boys, which lead to a sting to take down a pedophile ring operating through an online video game, which saw the result of a mentally disabled man named Matthew Daly arrested for alleged child grooming. Matthew had been there to genuinely make a friend without sinister intentions. Silva fought hard for Matthew's release and was apologetic to his mother, who became upset and stressed about her son possibly going to prison. Eventually, the charges against Matthew are dropped thanks to Nicholas Baxter and he is released, with Silva promising to keep in touch with him by continuing to play the online video game with him.

Juliana Aidén Martinez would later depart the cast after one season, with her character's departure from the squad never explained.

=== Renee Curry ===
- Portrayed by Aimé Donna Kelly
- Episodes: "Guardians and Gladiators" – present

Captain Renee Curry is a former IAB captain who joined SVU in season 25. She originally appeared on the show in season 22 episode "Guardians and Gladiators" in her role as an NYPD internal affairs bureau (IAB) Captain who launched an investigation into the SVU's policing after Benson was mentioned in a lawsuit against the NYPD for wrongfully profiling a civilian. Benson was subsequently cleared by Curry's investigation. Curry would make another appearance interviewing Benson following her involvement in a shooting involving the Organized Crime team. She formally transferred to SVU after the resignation of Chief McGrath following his controversial handling of a sexual assault case against his daughter.

Aimé Donna Kelly was promoted to a series regular starting with the twenty-seventh season.

=== Jake Griffin ===
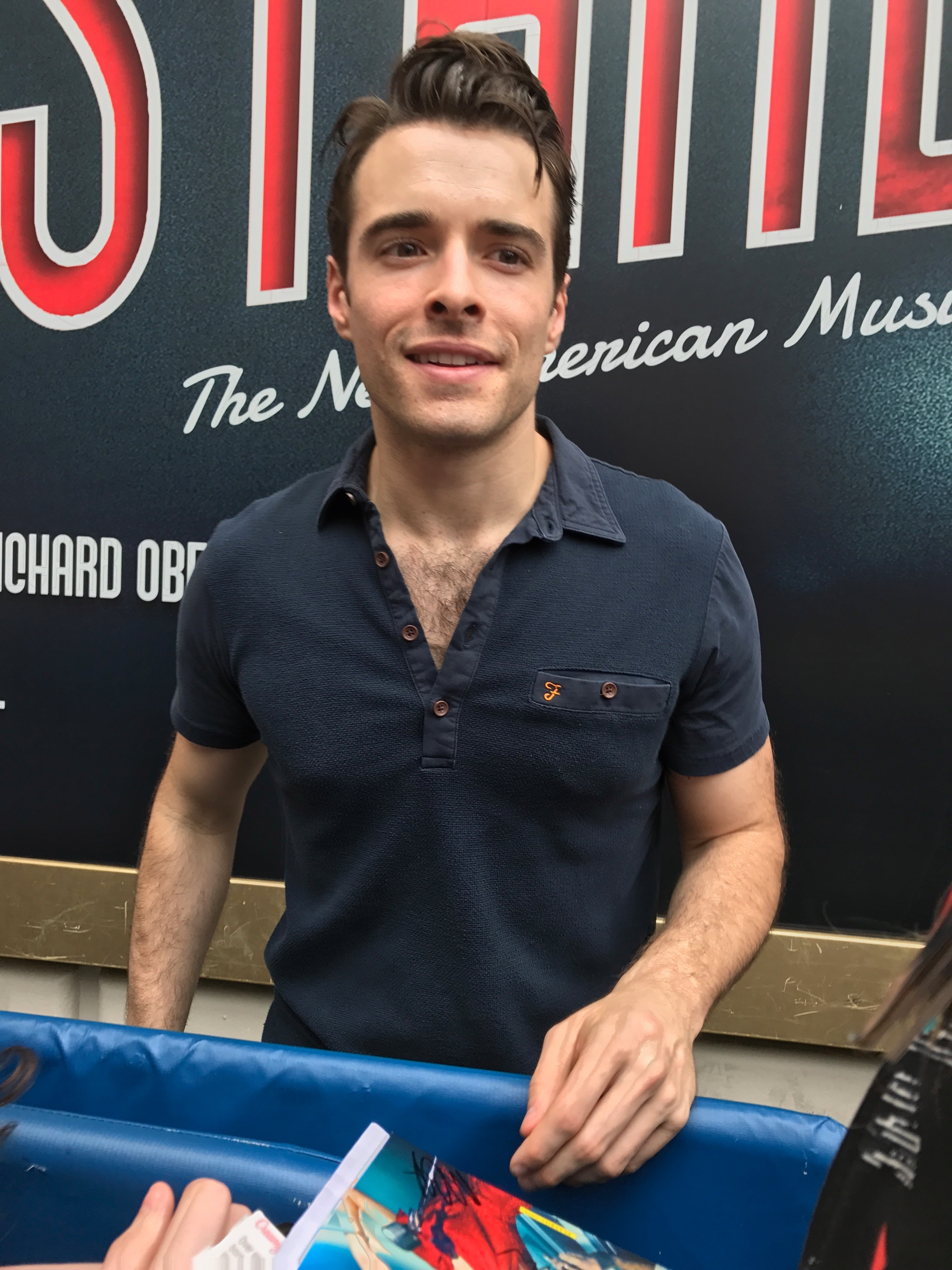
Corey Cott portrays Jake Griffin from 2025 to present.

- Portrayed by Corey Cott
- Episodes: "A Waiver of Consent" – present

Detective Jake Griffin is a close friend of Chief Katheryn Tynan, who assigned him to Benson's squad. Benson is suspicious of him, believing Griffin to be a spy for Tynan, though he insists he just wants to learn from her. He was given the nickname, "Batman", by other police officers while on the streets. In his first case with the squad involving a rape in a sex club, Griffin declined to inform Benson about a tattoo he saw on a victim's wrist. He also initially blocks the distraught victim from leaving the hospital room. Griffin would also later disobey Benson's orders for the squad to go home by going back to the club to try to infiltrate.

Corey Cott was promoted to a series regular in the ninth episode of season twenty-seventh.

== Assistant district attorneys ==
=== Alexandra Cabot ===
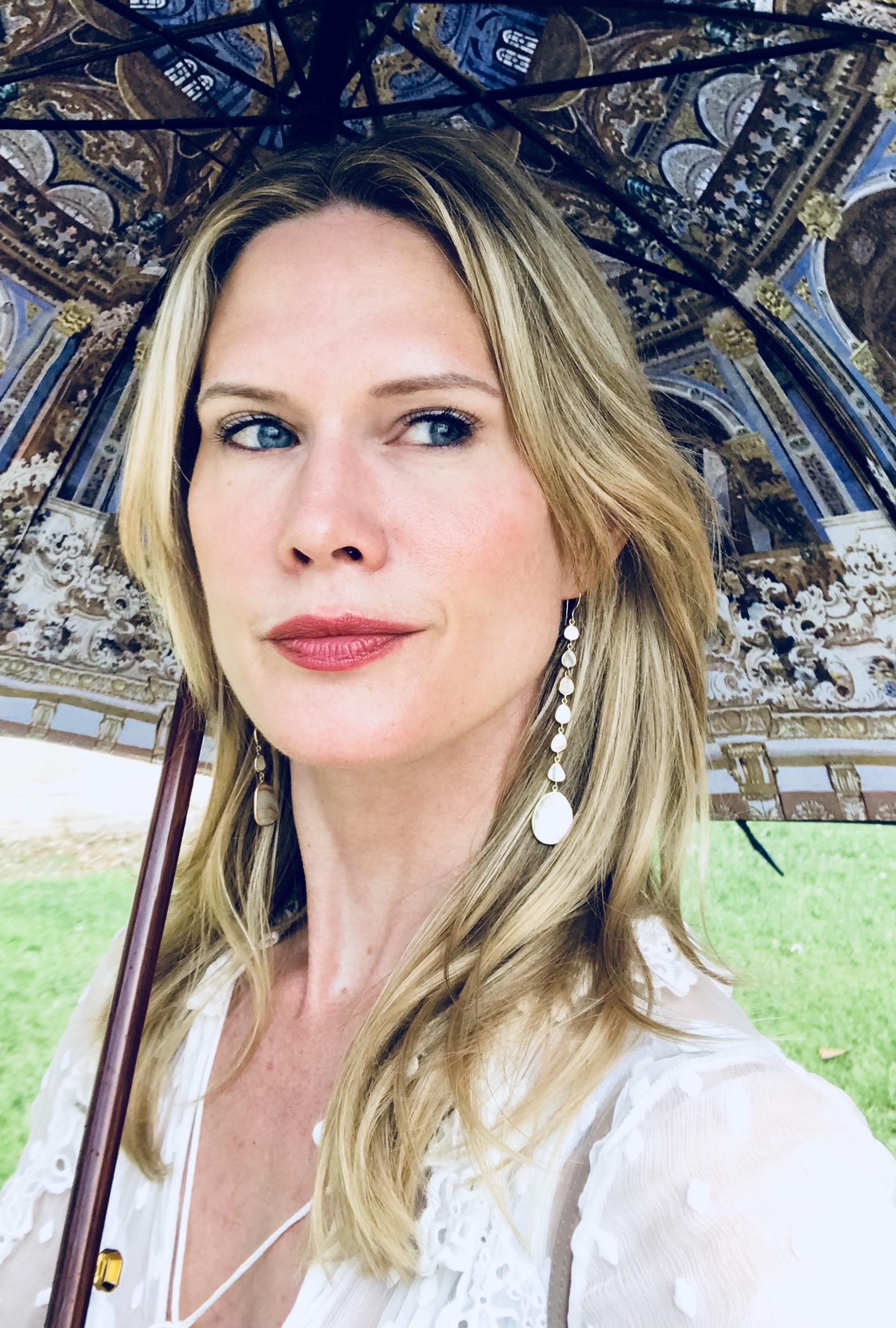
Alexandra Cabot was portrayed by Stephanie March.

- Portrayed by Stephanie March
- Episodes: "Wrong is Right" – "Loss", "Ghost", "Lead" – "Liberties", "Hardwired" – "Witness", "Scorched Earth" – "Learning Curve", "Sunk Cost Fallacy"

ADA Alexandra Cabot first appears in the season 2 premiere episode "Wrong Is Right", when she is assigned by the DA and Police Commissioner to work with SVU as their permanent ADA. She serves as SVU's ADA until the fourth episode of season 5, in which she survives an assassination attempt by a drug cartel's hitman and subsequently enters the Witness Protection Program. In the season 6 episode "Ghost", she returned to testify against her assassin, but quickly disappears back into Witness Protection after the trial.

She appears in the 2006 short-lived Law & Order spinoff Conviction as Bureau Chief of the homicide unit. In season 10, she makes a surprise return to SVU as the temporary ADA, replacing ADA Greylek, for six episodes, starting with the episode "Lead". Although Cabot was absent for the first four episodes of season 11, she becomes their permanent ADA in the fifth episode ("Hardwired") after EADA Sonya Paxton entered court-ordered alcohol rehab. She left SVU in the season 11 episode "Witness" to work for the International Criminal Court to seek justice for rape victims in the Congo. She later returned in the season 13 premiere "Scorched Earth", in which Cabot is the lead prosecutor in a rape case against a man who is the favorite to become Italy's next prime minister. She is the prosecutor in seven episodes, sharing the ADA duties with Casey Novak and Bureau Chief Mike Cutter. Cabot's last episode of season 13 was "Learning Curve" in which she is aiding in the investigation of a school molestation scandal.

=== Casey Novak ===
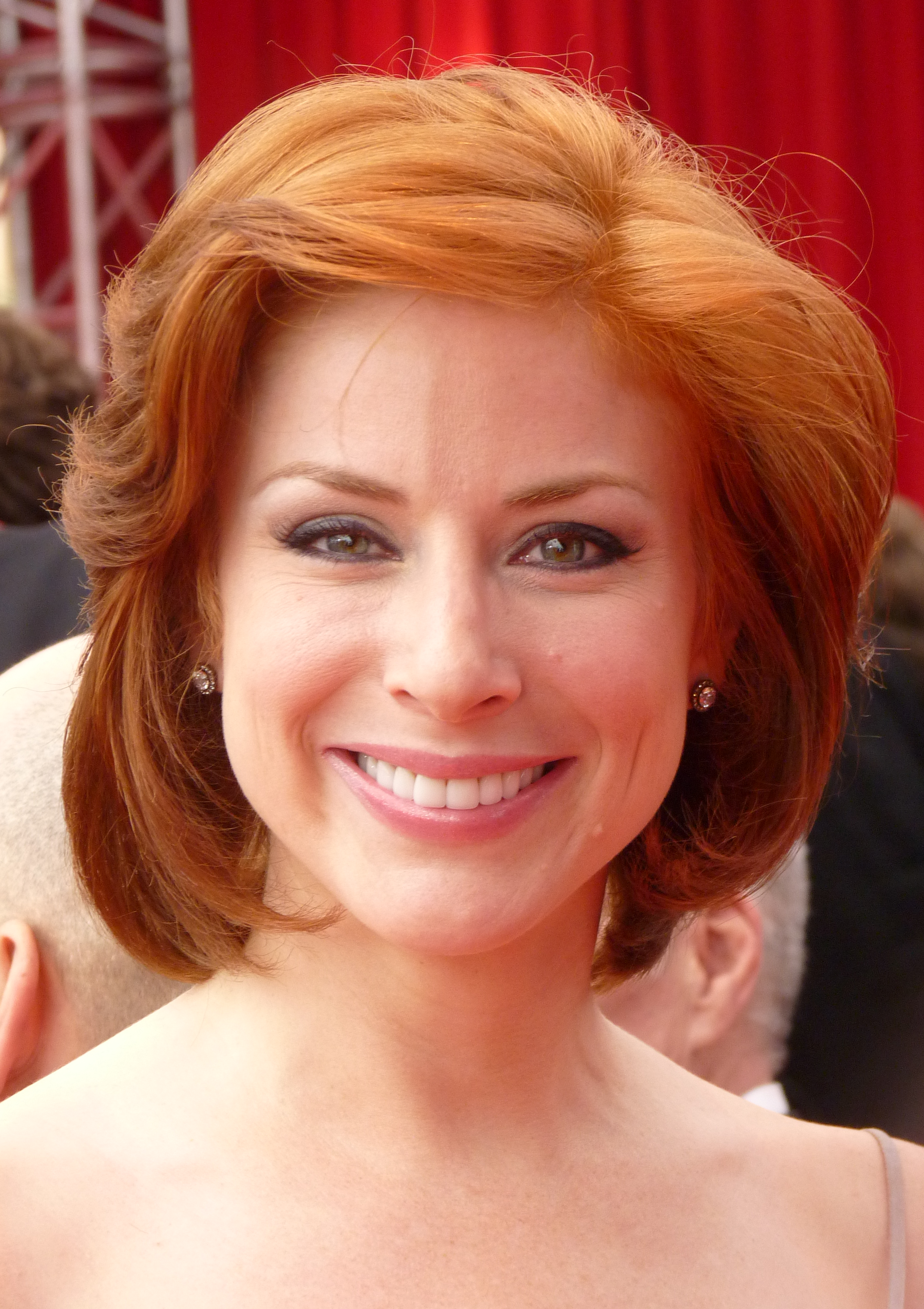
Casey Novak was portrayed by Diane Neal from 2003 to 2008 and 2011 to 2012.

- Portrayed by Diane Neal
- Episodes: "Serendipity" – "Cold", "Reparations", "Blood Brothers" – "Valentine's Day"

Casey Novak is SVU's Assistant District Attorney from seasons 5 to 9, replacing ADA Alexandra Cabot. Although she quickly loses her innocence when dealing with sex crimes, she still shows uneasiness when dealing with the gray areas of human involvement, preferring the letter of the law to the messiness of each individual reality. Nonetheless, Novak has a 71 percent success rate in the cases she prosecutes, whereas the average for prosecutors is 44 percent. After initial hesitation, she becomes particularly close to Stabler as they bond over being Catholic and a love of sports. It is revealed that in her final year of law school, Novak was engaged to a man, Charlie, who suffered from schizophrenia. She ended the relationship when his symptoms became so severe she felt she could no longer be intimate with him. In 2002, Charlie attacked her in her home during a psychotic episode. She convinced the police not to press charges, but ended the relationship. He eventually became homeless, and was found dead as a "John Doe" in the spring of 2007. She developed a deep compassion for the mentally ill afterward, but still feels guilty for not being able to help him, as shown in season 9's "Blinded." She states that she is a big supporter of the U.S military. She says that her father was an M-60 door gunner on a Huey during the Vietnam War. His helicopter crashed three times and he received a Purple Heart. In season 9, her final year as the SVU ADA, she grew increasingly more reckless and unsure in her prosecution. It is implied that friend and former boss Liz Donnelly (Judith Light) aided in her censure, leading to her replacement by ADA Kim Greylek in season 10.

It is revealed that Novak was censured for three years and subsequently re-hired by the DA's office. This is explained in the season 12 episode "Reparations", where she returns to SVU as their temporary ADA to prosecute a rape case. She is opposed by Law & Order: LA Deputy District Attorney Jonah Dekker (Terrence Howard) who is representing the defendant. Casey not only finds herself at odds with Dekker, but also Judge Lena Petrovsky (Joanna Merlin), to whom she had previously lied in the season 9 finale ("Cold"), which ultimately led to her censure.

ADA Novak returns as a recurring character, along with ADA Cabot, in season 13. She is last seen as the lead prosecutor in "Valentine's Day", in which she goes up against Defense Attorney Marvin Exley (Ron Rifkin), who is defending a woman who seems to have fabricated her own abduction.

=== Kim Greylek ===
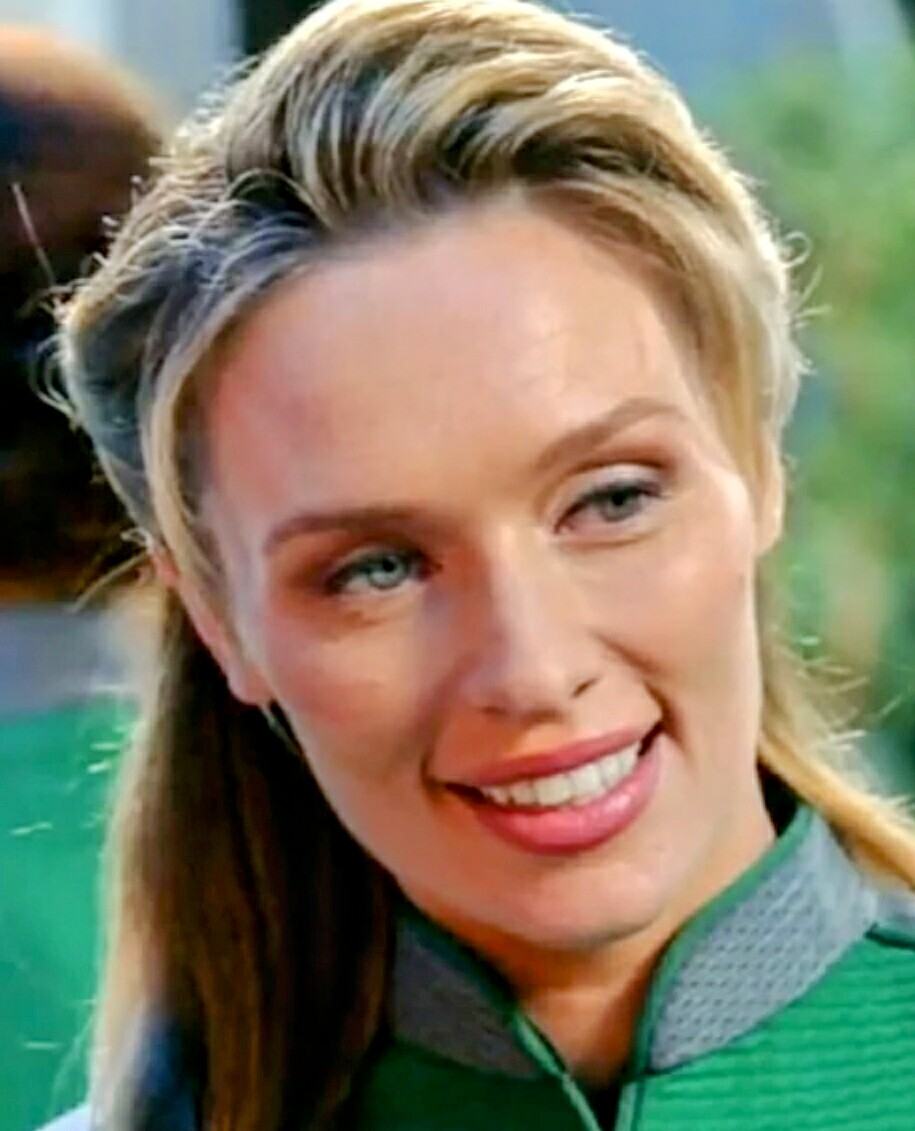
Michaela McManus portrayed Kim Greylek from 2008 to 2009.

- Portrayed by Michaela McManus
- Episodes: "Trials" – "Lead"

Kim Greylek is the SVU's Assistant District Attorney who replaces Casey Novak at the beginning of season 10. Greylek previously worked in the U.S. Department of Justice's Office on Violence Against Women in Washington, D.C. where she had the nickname of "The Crusader." A dogged prosecutor, she pushes the detectives to make cases for the sake of politics in favor of pursuing actual offenders. She can be unrelenting, threatening to charge a defendant with a hate crime for raping two women in the season 10 premiere, and having a teenage boy charged with assaulting a police officer so he can be tested for HIV. In the episode "Babes", Greylek also angers a woman believed to be involved with a young girl's suicide, but she is found not guilty. After gloating about her innocence, the woman attacks Greylek for correcting her about being "innocent" and to wash the blood off her hands before holding her daughter's baby. When the officers pull the woman off her, Greylek tells Stabler to charge her with assault.

But Greylek also has a softer side, as she warns Stabler to get a good defense attorney after his daughter Kathleen (Allison Siko), who has bipolar disorder, is charged with breaking and entering and theft, because the DA's office will prosecute her. Greylek also rushes to get justice for three women who were drugged and raped by a man obsessed with pornography in the episode "Smut". Greylek also seeks justice when a man is brutally beaten outside a strip club with the man's ex-wife and 13-year-old transgender daughter as the prime suspect.

After appearing in only 14 episodes, Greylek was written out of the series in the episode "Lead"; in the middle of a trial where pediatrician Gilbert Keppler (Lawrence Arancio) is found guilty of molesting four of his male patients. She is last seen doing a press conference with Cragen, Benson, and Stabler on the steps of the courthouse while the doctor's attorney hands the SVU squad a lawsuit for failure to take action against Keppler immediately. Later in the episode, Benson and Stabler discover the doctor murdered in his home. The detectives hold CSU out of the house until Cragen and Greylek arrive. Suddenly, they see ADA Cabot walk up to the scene with Cragen. Cabot tells the detectives that the Justice Department called Greylek back to Washington and DA Jack McCoy (Sam Waterston) let her leave immediately.

=== Rafael Barba ===
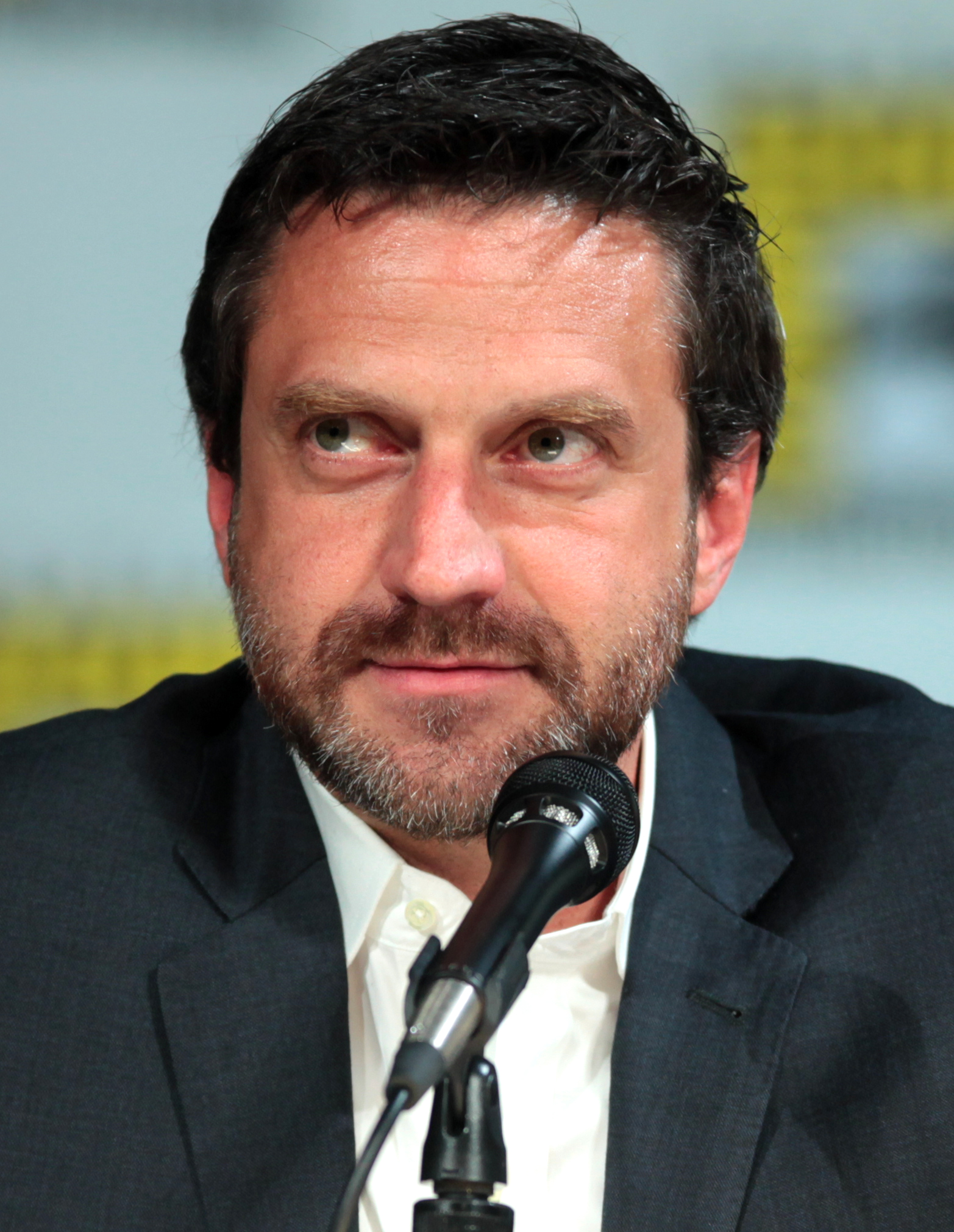
Rafael Barba was portrayed by Raúl Esparza from 2012 to 2018.

- Portrayed by Raúl Esparza
- Episodes: "Twenty-Five Acts" – "The Undiscovered Country", "Redemption In Her Corner" – "A Final Call At Forlini's Bar"

Assistant District Attorney Rafael Barba is brought in at the behest of temporary SVU captain Steven Harris (Adam Baldwin) when Barba requests a transfer from Brooklyn to Manhattan after he prosecutes two johns for raping a prostitute. Barba is a headstrong, by-the-book prosecutor, who puts pressure on not only the detectives, but also the victims and witnesses. In his first case, he prosecutes a rape similar to one portrayed in the best selling erotic novel Twenty-Five Acts, supposedly written by the victim, Jocelyn Paley (Anna Chlumsky). Barba tells the detectives to uncover anything and everything about Paley and her attacker. After rushing to put Paley on the stand to testify, Barba and the detectives discover that she did not write the book, which forces Barba to get creative with the trial. When Barba exposes the defendant's viciousness by taunting him with a belt, the jury finds the defendant guilty.

ADA Barba goes head to head with the Suffolk County District Attorney, Pam James (Jane Kaczmarek), in the episode "Beautiful Frame", after a Manhattan rape victim is charged with murder of her ex-boyfriend in Suffolk County. Benson questions the charges against the woman and gathers enough evidence for Barba to put another man on trial for the murder, as Barba and James race to get a conviction before the other. Barba and the SVU detectives uncover a scandal within the Suffolk County DA's office, as one of James' investigators set the young woman up for the murder. Barba offers to spare James' office further embarrassment as long as the investigator is convicted for the murder in Suffolk County.

In the episode, "Funny Valentine", Barba and the detectives have a tough time convincing pop star Micha Green (Tiffany Robinson) to testify against her abusive boyfriend, hip-hop artist Caleb Bryant (Eugene Jones III). After a shooting that kills her manager with Bryant as a suspect, Barba and Benson convince Green to testify to the grand jury. But when she finally takes the stand, she tells Barba that Bryant was not at the scene and instead says Barba and Benson put those words in her mouth. The couple flees on a vacation, where Bryant finally beats Green to death.

Towards the end of the fourteenth season, Barba becomes close with the squad, and they rely on his legal advice on many of their assigned cases. In the episode "Undercover Blue", Benson goes to Barba in an attempt to provide evidence that could potentially exonerate Brian Cassidy (Dean Winters) against a rape charge. In the season finale "Her Negotiation", Rollins calls Barba in on a weekend for a misdemeanor case in which she senses the accused, William Lewis (Pablo Schreiber) is more dangerous than he seems. When Lewis turns out to be a serial rapist and murderer, Barba tries to put him in prison, but Lewis’ lawyer (and lover) manages to get the charges dropped. Soon afterward, Lewis kidnaps and tortures Benson, who escapes after beating him within an inch of his life. In “Psycho/Therapist”, Barba faces Lewis in court when the latter acts as his own lawyer and accuses Benson of assaulting him. Barba manages to convict Lewis of kidnapping, unaware that Benson gave perjured testimony.

Esparza was added to the opening credits in season 15, making Barba the squad's fourth full-time ADA. On February 7, 2018, Esparza left the series after six seasons in the episode "The Undiscovered Country". In this episode, Barba disconnects a severely handicapped baby's life support in a mercy killing and is charged with murder. Although he is found innocent, he decides that it is time to move on from the DA's office.

=== Peter Stone ===
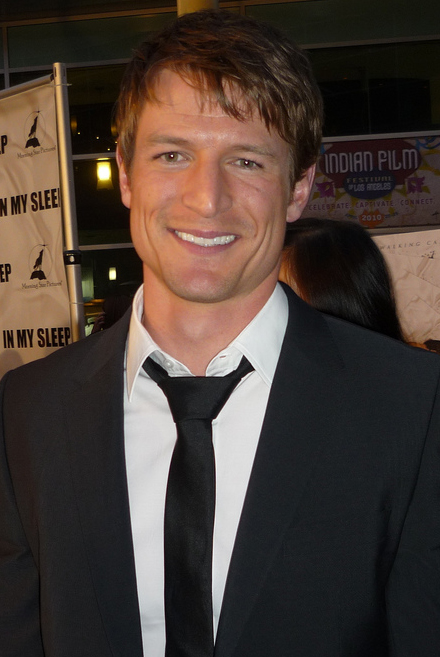
Peter Stone was portrayed by Philip Winchester from 2018 to 2019.

- Portrayed by Philip Winchester
- Episodes: "The Undiscovered Country" - "End Game"

Assistant District Attorney Peter Stone is appointed by District Attorney Jack McCoy as special counsel prosecuting Rafael Barba in the death of a terminally ill child in the episode "The Undiscovered Country". First introduced in the Chicago P.D. third season episode "Justice" and appearing in his own show, Chicago Justice, Stone, the son of the late Executive ADA Ben Stone (Michael Moriarty) has spent most of his adult life in Chicago, primarily as prosecutor with the State's Attorney's office in Cook County.

In his first appearance at Law & Order: SVU, Stone attends his father's funeral before being brought in to prosecute Barba. However, when Benson confronts him during the trial and he admits he sympathizes with Barba but cannot ignore the prosecution because he fears it will set a bad example to others, she urges him to talk to Barba and be more reasonable with him. This later results in Barba being found not guilty, a result Stone ultimately approves of.

After Barba resigns, traumatized by the case, Stone takes over as ADA overseeing the Manhattan SVU. His stint begins to a rocky start, particularly with initial tension with the rest of the members of the SVU team due to Barba's sudden departure. He soon begins to grow into the job and bond with them, particularly as he reveals that he was a professional baseball player in the Chicago Cubs' minor league system, briefly called up to the major leagues, but was forced to retire from the game due to injury that tore his ligament. He also has a sister named Pamela (Amy Korb) who suffers from paranoid schizophrenia and whom their father committed to a psychiatric hospital. Peter visits her every week after their father's death.

When Pamela begins to show signs of memory loss, believing that he is their father, Stone reluctantly increases her medication on her doctor's advice, concerned that stopping the medication could cause her to become suicidal. In the episode "Remember Me, Too", Pamela is abducted by members of a criminal network Peter is prosecuting, who ultimately invade the psychiatric hospital and shoot her. Pamela dies in her devastated brother's arms. In the season 20 premiere "Man Up", it is revealed that Stone blames himself for her death, and has been drinking heavily and having anonymous sex to numb the guilt. In the final episode of season 20, Stone devises a fake prosecution to entrap serial rapist Rob Miller (Titus Welliver), and tells one of his victims to lie under oath. The ruse is revealed, making Miller so angry that he incriminates himself – just as Stone planned. While his plan is successful, however, he realizes that he let his emotions get the better of his legal ethics, and that he has to resign to make sure it doesn't happen again.

=== Dominick Carisi Jr. ===
Dominick "Sonny" Carisi Jr.
- Law & Order character
- First appearance: "Girls Disappeared"
- Portrayed by: Peter Scanavino

In-universe information
- Titles: NYPD Junior Detective (Seasons 16–21); Assistant District Attorney (Season 21–)
- Family: Bella Carisi (sister); Gina Carisi (sister); Theresa Carisi (sister); Mia Morino (niece); Serafina Carisi (mother)
- Spouse: Amanda Rollins (m. 2022)
- Children: Jesse Rollins (stepdaughter); Billie Rollins (stepdaughter); Nicky (son)
- Partner: Fin Tutuola; Nick Amaro; Amanda Rollins
- Seasons: 16, 17, 18, 19, 20, 21, 22, 23, 24, 25, 26

Assistant District Attorney Dominick "Sonny" Carisi Jr. is introduced in the season 16 premiere, "Girls Disappeared". Carisi is an inexperienced detective who transfers to the Manhattan Special Victims Unit as Detective Nick Amaro's (Danny Pino) temporary replacement when Amaro is reassigned to Queens. In the fifth episode of season 16, it is revealed he has permanently joined the Manhattan SVU team. He began his law enforcement career as a patrol officer in the Bronx. After getting his detective's shield, he did some time in Vice and then did short stints in the Special Victims Units in the Bronx, Brooklyn and Staten Island before transferring to Manhattan SVU.

Carisi and his three sisters grew up "off Arden Avenue" in Staten Island, where their parents still reside; in real life, it is located within one of the few remaining New York City districts with a significant population of Italian-Americans. He comes from a tight-knit family and has spoken fondly of his parents, sisters and various relatives. A fourth-generation Italian-American, his great-grandfather immigrated to the United States from Turin as a boy. He was raised and still is a practicing Roman Catholic; two of his cousins are in the priesthood and he had aspired to do so as a child.

Carisi gets off to a rough start with his new colleagues in the sixteenth season premiere episode "Girls Disappeared", coming off as blunt and insensitive during his initial meeting with Sergeant Olivia Benson (Mariska Hargitay) and Detective Amanda Rollins (Kelli Giddish). He is nonetheless a talented detective with a knack for interrogations, getting suspects to talk by playing "good cop". He also eventually wins his colleagues' respect and friendship.

Unlike his older, more seasoned colleagues, he has difficulty keeping his emotions in check when confronted by the horrific crimes he sees, especially those involving religious leaders or the perpetrator abusing another family member. He is particularly upset by a case in which prominent dentist Neil Alexander (Paul Adelstein) rapes his own niece; while taking Alexander's fingerprints, Carisi loses his temper and nearly breaks Alexander's hand.

In the fifth episode, Carisi helps turn one suspect against another during the investigation of a porn star's rape, earning him praise from Benson. Throughout season 16, he mentions that he is going to night classes at Fordham University's law school. A running joke has Carisi annoying Assistant District Attorney Rafael Barba (Raúl Esparza) with unsolicited advice on how to prosecute cases. Barba eventually allows Carisi to shadow him for a trial, with Carisi helping Barba spot a key inconsistency in a witness' testimony. Some months later, Carisi reveals that he has recently taken the bar exam and thanks Barba for the earlier opportunity. The season 17 episode "Intersecting Lives" reveals that Carisi has passed the exam. At the end of the season finale "Heartfelt Passages", he serves as a pallbearer for Sgt. Mike Dodds (Andy Karl) after the latter is killed by a corrupt corrections officer in a hostage situation. Carisi had considered applying for an ADA position but decides to stay since the SVU will be a detective down following Dodds' death.

In "Parole Violations", his sister Bella's (Marin Ireland) fiancé Tommy (Michael Chernus) reports that his female parole officer raped him at gunpoint in her office. While he dislikes Tommy, Carisi comes to believe his story and works to make sure that the woman is brought to justice.

In "Next Chapter", he is held at gunpoint and nearly killed by a rape suspect, former police Sgt. Tom Cole (Chris Bauer). Benson saves him by shooting Cole in the back of the head, killing him.

In "In Loco Parentis", Carisi's niece Mia (Ryann Shane) says she was raped by a classmate, Ethan (Sam Vartholomeos), at a college party, but later admits it was consensual. However, Ethan rapes her for real in her room after she invites him over to apologize. Carisi takes the stand in Ethan's trial and admits what Mia told him. ADA Peter Stone (Philip Winchester) gets Ethan to confess to the rape, for which he is sentenced to seven years in prison. Carisi helps Mia move out of her dorm and tells her that she was not at fault for what happened to her.

In "Sunk Cost Fallacy", while driving a victim, Jules Hunter (Sarah Wilson), to her house, Carisi's car is hit by a car ignoring a stop sign; the driver flees the scene, with the car being reported as stolen two days prior. Carisi is injured, and Jules is killed. It is implied that their car was hit by Jules' abusive husband, Nick (Scott Porter).

In the season 21 premiere, "I'm Going to Make You a Star", Carisi leaves the NYPD to become an assistant district attorney. His new role finds him caught in the middle of conflicts between his former colleagues at SVU and his new boss, Vanessa Hadid (Zuleikha Robinson), at the district attorney's office. However, his former colleagues still consider him a friend despite professional differences and Benson attended his first trial as an ADA to provide moral support. Of the detectives who joined the SVU after his resignation, he gets along best with Velasco and they play basketball together regularly.

During "She Paints for Vengeance", he is assigned his first case as a full-fledged ADA when a young stripper/aspiring artist (Tonya Glanz) is raped by a former athlete. Carisi initially has trouble defending her and nearly resigns, but chooses to stay on the case after encouragement from Benson. The next day, he handles his job more professionally by getting the rapist to show his aggressive nature, resulting in a conviction.

Carisi marries former fellow SVU detective Amanda Rollins. She initially views him unfavorably when he first transfers to the SVU. By season 20, they develop a close friendship and he is named godfather to her second daughter Billie in the season 21 episode "The Burden of Our Choices". In the season 22 finale, Carisi and Rollins kiss. In the season 23 premiere, “And the Empire Strikes Back”, it is revealed that he and Rollins are dating. In the season 24 episode "And a Trauma in a Pear Tree", they marry in a civil ceremony presided by Judge McNamara and with Benson, Fin and Velasco standing as witnesses.

== Medical experts ==
=== George Huang ===
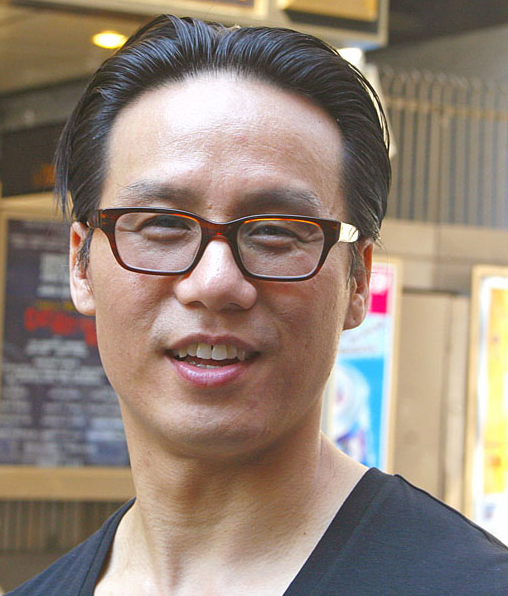
George Huang was portrayed by BD Wong from 2001 to 2015.

- Portrayed by BD Wong
- Episodes: "Pique" – "Bombshell", "Father Dearest", "Born Psychopath", "Thought Criminal", "Depravity Standard"

Dr. Huang is an FBI forensic psychiatrist and criminal profiler, specializing in studying sexual predators and their victims. He becomes SVU's resident psychiatrist in season 3 after he was originally on loan to the squad towards the end of season 2. Though he is liked and respected by the SVU detectives and they generally defer to his professional judgment, his diagnoses sometimes hinder prosecutions, particularly where he finds mental illness, making defendants either not fully responsible for their crimes, or not fit to stand trial. This makes him a constant hindrance for the ADAs who are trying to prosecute the offenders. He frequently observes interrogations of suspects, advising detectives on how to best interact to obtain a confession. Very little is known about Huang's personal life, other than that he is gay, which he noted in season 11's "Hardwired", has a sister (noted in "Inheritance"), and that he speaks Cantonese and Mandarin.

Dr. Huang was last seen in a main role during the season 12 episode "Bombshell" in which he helps Benson and Stabler get information out of a homeless man. The reason for his departure is not revealed until the season 13 episode "Father Dearest" in which Dr. Huang returns to the SVU squad temporarily to aid in an investigation and tells them about his new assignment in Oklahoma City. Huang returns to New York in the season 14 episode, "Born Psychopath", and helps the SVU detectives with a case involving a young boy who has become increasingly violent towards those close to him. He diagnoses the boy with antisocial personality disorder and makes arrangements to get him into a treatment facility.

After not appearing in season 16, the first season he did not appear in since joining the show in season 2, Huang returns in the season 17 episode, "Depravity Standard". He tells Benson that he took early retirement from the FBI in order to return to New York, where he is now doing private consulting.

=== Melinda Warner ===
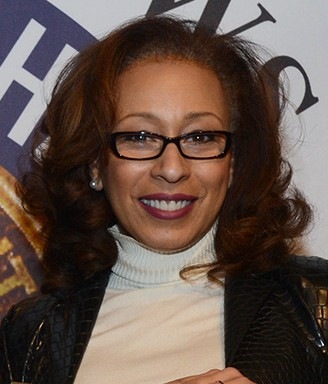
Melinda Warner has been portrayed by Tamara Tunie since 2000.

- Portrayed by Tamara Tunie
- Episodes: "Noncompliance" – "The Five Hundredth Episode"

Dr. Warner is a NYC medical examiner who is one of SVU's biggest allies. Though originally a recurring character, she became a regular cast member in season 7, remaining through season 12; she reverted to being a recurring character in season 13. In the season 7 episode "Blast", she becomes directly involved in the efforts to rescue an eight-year-old kidnapping victim who has just been diagnosed with leukemia. Warner is held hostage with Detective Stabler at a bank where the hostage taker's father is the manager. When the taker demands Detective Stabler to come out of the office, he gives Warner his second gun, which she later uses to shoot the taker to prevent him from committing suicide by cop. In the season 9 episode, "Harm", she uses her medical skills to diagnose past torture in a victim and takes the lead in making the case to prosecute the doctor responsible. In the season 11 finale "Shattered", she is held hostage in her own morgue with Detective Benson and ADA Marlowe and is shot by the woman holding them hostage. She talks Benson through life-saving techniques before the woman lets her go to get real medical attention. She is well liked by the SVU squad, though briefly argues with Stabler when he accuses her of botching a DNA test on Benson, expected to absolve her of a homicide, before she discovered the DNA was intentionally doctored to make Benson look guilty. She served as a doctor in the U.S. Air Force during the Gulf War and is married with a daughter.

== Recurring characters ==
=== NYPD personnel ===
| Character | Cast | Years | Seasons | | | | | | | | | | | | | | | | | | | | | | | | | | | # Eps |
| Character | Cast | Years | 1 | 2 | 3 | 4 | 5 | 6 | 7 | 8 | 9 | 10 | 11 | 12 | 13 | 14 | 15 | 16 | 17 | 18 | 19 | 20 | 21 | 22 | 23 | 24 | 25 | 26 | 27 | # Eps |
|---|---|---|---|---|---|---|---|---|---|---|---|---|---|---|---|---|---|---|---|---|---|---|---|---|---|---|---|---|---|---|
| Brian Cassidy | Dean Winters | 1999–2018 | | | | | | | | | | | | | Recurring | Recurring | Recurring | | | | | | | | | | | | | 34 |
| Ken Briscoe | Chris Orbach | 1999–2000 | | | | | | | | | | | | | | | | | | | | | | | | | | | | 11 |
| Lennie Briscoe (Note: Crossover from Law & Order.) | Jerry Orbach | 1999–2000 | | | | | | | | | | | | | | | | | | | | | | | | | | | | 3 |
| Ed Green | Jesse L. Martin | 1999–2000 | | | | | | | | | | | | | | | | | | | | | | | | | | | | 2 |
| Lyle Morris | John Driver | 2000 | | | | | | | | | | | | | | | | | | | | | | | | | | | | 2 |
| Ruben Morales | Joel de la Fuente | 2002–2011 | | | Recurring | Recurring | Recurring | Recurring | Recurring | Recurring | Recurring | Recurring | Recurring | Recurring | | | | | | | | | | | | | | | | 52 |
| Ed Tucker | Robert John Burke | 2002–2020 | | | Recurring | Recurring | Recurring | | | Recurring | Recurring | Recurring | Recurring | Recurring | | Recurring | Recurring | Recurring | Recurring | Recurring | | | | | | | | | | 30 |
| Robbins | William H. Burns | 2002–2006 | | | | | Recurring | Recurring | Recurring | | | | | | | | | | | | | | | | | | | | | 6 |
| Ramirez | Donnetta Lavinia Grays | 2003–2007 | | | | | Recurring | Recurring | Recurring | | | | | | | | | | | | | | | | | | | | | 7 |
| Muldrew | John Schuck | 2004–2010 | | | | | | Recurring | Recurring | Recurring | Recurring | | | | | | | | | | | | | | | | | | | 8 |
| Mike Sandoval | Nicholas Gonzalez | 2004–2005 | | | | | | | | | | | | | | | | | | | | | | | | | | | | 2 |
| Danielle Beck | Connie Nielsen | 2006 | | | | | | | | | | | | | | | | | | | | | | | | | | | | 6 |
| Joe Dumas | Scott William Winters | 2011–2015 | | | | | | | | | | | | | | | | | | | | | | | | | | | | 4 |
| Steven Harris | Adam Baldwin | 2012 | | | | | | | | | | | | | | | | | | | | | | | | | | | | 3 |
| Cole Draper | Michael Potts | 2012–2016 | | | | | | | | | | | | | | | | | | | | | | | | | | | | 6 |
| Alex Eames (Note: Crossover from Law & Order: Criminal Intent.) | Kathryn Erbe | 2012–2013 | | | | | | | | | | | | | | | | | | | | | | | | | | | | 2 |
| Hank Abraham | Josh Pais | 2013–2016 | | | | | | | | | | | | | | | Recurring | Recurring | Recurring | | | | | | | | | | | 7 |
| Declan Murphy | Donal Logue | 2014–2022 | | | | | | | | | | | | | | | Recurring | Recurring | Recurring | | | | | | | | | | | 9 |
| William Dodds | Peter Gallagher | 2014–2019 | | | | | | | | | | | | | | | | Recurring | Recurring | Recurring | Recurring | Recurring | Recurring | | | | | | | 19 |
| Mike Dodds | Andy Karl | 2015–2016 | | | | | | | | | | | | | | | | | | | | | | | | | | | | 14 |
| Bobby Nardone | Paul Bomba | 2018– | | | | | | | | | | | | | | | | | | | | | | Recurring | Recurring | Recurring | Recurring | Recurring | | 9 |
| Gabrielle Taylor | Ashley Taylor Greaves | 2019– | | | | | | | | | | | | | | | | | | | | | Recurring | Recurring | Recurring | Recurring | Recurring | | | 8 |
| Kivlahan | Thamer Jendoubi | 2019– | | | | | | | | | | | | | | | | | | | | | Recurring | Recurring | Recurring | Recurring | Recurring | Recurring | | 8 |
| Hasim Khaldun | Ari'el Stachel | 2020–2022 | | | | | | | | | | | | | | | | | | | | | Recurring | Recurring | Recurring | | | | | 6 |
| Tommy McGrath | Terry Serpico | 2021–2024 | | | | | | | | | | | | | | | | | | | | | | Recurring | Recurring | Recurring | Recurring | | | 16 |
| Ayanna Bell (Note: Crossover from Law & Order: Organized Crime.) | Danielle Moné Truitt | 2021– | | | | | | | | | | | | | | | | | | | | | | Recurring | Recurring | Recurring | | | | 4 |
| Jet Slootmaekers | Ainsley Seiger | 2021–2022 | | | | | | | | | | | | | | | | | | | | | | | | | | | | 3 |
| Eric Tran | Quentin Nguyen-Duy | 2021– | | | | | | | | | | | | | | | | | | | | | | | | | | | | 5 |
| Tonie Churlish | Jasmine Batchelor | 2023 | | | | | | | | | | | | | | | | | | | | | | | | | | | | 11 |

=== Crime Scene Unit technicians ===
Full title: New York City Police Department Crime Scene Unit Forensic Technician Officers

| Characters | Cast | Years | Seasons | | | | | | | | | | | | | | | | | | | | | | | | | | # Eps |
| Characters | Cast | Years | 1 | 2 | 3 | 4 | 5 | 6 | 7 | 8 | 9 | 10 | 11 | 12 | 13 | 14 | 15 | 16 | 17 | 18 | 19 | 20 | 21 | 22 | 23 | 24 | 25 | 26 | # Eps |
|---|---|---|---|---|---|---|---|---|---|---|---|---|---|---|---|---|---|---|---|---|---|---|---|---|---|---|---|---|---|
| Georgie | Welly Yang | 1999–2003 | | | | | | | | | | | | | | | | | | | | | | | | | | | 13 |
| Harry Martin | Lou Carbonneau | 2000–2002 | | Recurring | Recurring | Recurring | | | | | | | | | | | | | | | | | | | | | | | 12 |
| Burt Trevor | Daniel Sunjata | 2002–2004 | | | Recurring | Recurring | Recurring | | | | | | | | | | | | | | | | | | | | | | 15 |
| David Layton | Jordan Gelber | 2002–2003 | | | | | | | | | | | | | | | | | | | | | | | | | | | 8 |
| Cpt. Judith Siper | Caren Browning | 2003–2011 | | | | Recurring | Recurring | Recurring | Recurring | Recurring | Recurring | Recurring | Recurring | Recurring | | | | | | | | | | | | | | | 41 |
| Ryan O'Halloran | Mike Doyle | 2003–2009 | | | | | Recurring | Recurring | Recurring | Recurring | Recurring | Recurring | | | | | | | | | | | | | | | | | 52 |
| Pat Fisher | Gibson Frazier | 2004 | | | | | | | | | | | | | | | | | | | | | | | | | | | 2 |
| Millie Vizcarrondo | Paula Garcés | 2005 | | | | | | | | | | | | | | | | | | | | | | | | | | | 4 |
| Martin | Edelen McWilliams | 2008– | | | | | | | | | | | | | | | | | | | | | | | | Recurring | Recurring | Recurring | 14 |
| Dale Stuckey | Noel Fisher | 2009 | | | | | | | | | | | | | | | | | | | | | | | | | | | 4 |
| Keegan Simmons | Jabari Gray | 2009–2010 | | | | | | | | | | | | | | | | | | | | | | | | | | | 6 |
| Adrienne Sung | James Chen | 2011 | | | | | | | | | | | | | | | | | | | | | | | | | | | 7 |
| Colin Bennett | Max Baker | 2012–2015 | | | | | | | | | | | | | | | | | | | | | | | | | | | 4 |

=== FBI special agents ===
| Characters | Cast | Years | Seasons | | | | | | | | | | | | | | | | | | | | | | | | | | # Eps |
| Characters | Cast | Years | 1 | 2 | 3 | 4 | 5 | 6 | 7 | 8 | 9 | 10 | 11 | 12 | 13 | 14 | 15 | 16 | 17 | 18 | 19 | 20 | 21 | 22 | 23 | 24 | 25 | 26 | # Eps |
|---|---|---|---|---|---|---|---|---|---|---|---|---|---|---|---|---|---|---|---|---|---|---|---|---|---|---|---|---|---|
| Dana Lewis | Marcia Gay Harden | 2005–2013 | | | | | | | | | | | | | | | | | | | | | | | | | | | 4 |
| Lockwood | David Dollase | 2006 | | | | | | | | | | | | | | | | | | | | | | | | | | | 2 |
| Dean Porter | Vincent Spano | 2006–2009 | | | | | | | | | | | | | | | | | | | | | | | | | | | 5 |
| Tom Nickerson | Frankie Faison | 2007–2008 | | | | | | | | | | | | | | | | | | | | | | | | | | | 2 |
| O'Connell | Frank Deal | 2012–2014 | | | | | | | | | | | | | | Recurring | Recurring | Recurring | | | | | | | | | | | 3 |

=== Assistant United States attorneys ===
| Characters | Cast | Years | Seasons | | | | | | | | | | | | | | | | | | | | | | | # Eps |
| Characters | Cast | Years | 1 | 2 | 3 | 4 | 5 | 6 | 7 | 8 | 9 | 10 | 11 | 12 | 13 | 14 | 15 | 16 | 17 | 18 | 19 | 20 | 21 | 22 | 23 | # Eps |
|---|---|---|---|---|---|---|---|---|---|---|---|---|---|---|---|---|---|---|---|---|---|---|---|---|---|---|
| Claudia Williams | Pam Grier | 2002–2003 | | | | | | | | | | | | | | | | | | | | | | | | 2 |
| Camilla Velez | Valerie Cruz | 2010 | | | | | | | | | | | | | | | | | | | | | | | | 2 |
| Christine Danielson (Note: Previously bureau chief assistant district attorney.) | Gloria Reuben | 2010–2011 | | | | | | | | | | | | | | | | | | | | | | | | 2 |
| Connie Rubirosa (Note: Crossover from Law & Order; previously assistant district attorney.) | Alana de la Garza | 2014 | | | | | | | | | | | | | | | | | | | | | | | | 1 |

=== Manhattan district attorneys ===
| Characters | Cast | Years | Seasons | | | | | | | | | | | | | | | | | | | | | | | # Eps |
| Characters | Cast | Years | 1 | 2 | 3 | 4 | 5 | 6 | 7 | 8 | 9 | 10 | 11 | 12 | 13 | 14 | 15 | 16 | 17 | 18 | 19 | 20 | 21 | 22 | 23 | # Eps |
|---|---|---|---|---|---|---|---|---|---|---|---|---|---|---|---|---|---|---|---|---|---|---|---|---|---|---|
| Nora Lewin (Note: Crossover from Law & Order.) | Dianne Wiest | 2001–2002 | | | | | | | | | | | | | | | | | | | | | | | | 2 |
| Arthur Branch | Fred Dalton Thompson | 2003–2006 | | | | Recurring | Recurring | Recurring | Recurring | | | | | | | | | | | | | | | | | 11 |
| Jack McCoy (Note: Crossover from Law & Order; previously executive assistant district attorney.) | Sam Waterston | 2007–2018 | | | | | | | | | | | | | | | | | | | | | | | | 3 |

=== Chief assistant district attorneys ===
| Character | Cast | Years | Seasons | | | | | | | | | | | | | | | | | | | | | | | | | | # Eps |
| Character | Cast | Years | 1 | 2 | 3 | 4 | 5 | 6 | 7 | 8 | 9 | 10 | 11 | 12 | 13 | 14 | 15 | 16 | 17 | 18 | 19 | 20 | 21 | 22 | 23 | 24 | 25 | 26 | # Eps |
|---|---|---|---|---|---|---|---|---|---|---|---|---|---|---|---|---|---|---|---|---|---|---|---|---|---|---|---|---|---|
| Charlie Phillips | Jeffrey DeMunn | 2000–2001 | | | | | | | | | | | | | | | | | | | | | | | | | | | 2 |

=== Bureau chief assistant district attorneys ===
| Character | Cast | Years | Seasons | | | | | | | | | | | | | | | | | | | | | | | | # Eps |
| Character | Cast | Years | 1 | 2 | 3 | 4 | 5 | 6 | 7 | 8 | 9 | 10 | 11 | 12 | 13 | 14 | 15 | 16 | 17 | 18 | 19 | 20 | 21 | 22 | 23 | 24 | # Eps |
|---|---|---|---|---|---|---|---|---|---|---|---|---|---|---|---|---|---|---|---|---|---|---|---|---|---|---|---|
| Liz Donnelly (Note: Later served as judge.) | Judith Light | 2002–2004 | | | | | | | | | | | | | | | | | | | | | | | | | 12 |
| Christine Danielson (Note: Later served as assistant United States attorney.) | Gloria Reuben | 2007 | | | | | | | | | | | | | | | | | | | | | | | | | 1 |
| Michael Cutter (Note: Crossover from Law & Order.) | Linus Roache | 2011–2012 | | | | | | | | | | | | | | | | | | | | | | | | | 4 |
| Paula Foster | Paget Brewster | 2012 | | | | | | | | | | | | | | | | | | | | | | | | | 2 |
| Vanessa Hadid | Zuleikha Robinson | 2019–2020 | | | | | | | | | | | | | | | | | | | | | | | | | 8 |
| Phillip Baptiste | Teagle F. Bougere | 2021–2022 | | | | | | | | | | | | | | | | | | | | | | | | | 3 |

=== Executive assistant district attorneys ===
| Character | Cast | Years | Seasons | | | | | | | | | | | | | | | | | | | | | | | # Eps |
| Character | Cast | Years | 1 | 2 | 3 | 4 | 5 | 6 | 7 | 8 | 9 | 10 | 11 | 12 | 13 | 14 | 15 | 16 | 17 | 18 | 19 | 20 | 21 | 22 | 23 | # Eps |
|---|---|---|---|---|---|---|---|---|---|---|---|---|---|---|---|---|---|---|---|---|---|---|---|---|---|---|
| Jack McCoy (Note: Crossover from Law & Order; later served as Manhattan DA.) | Sam Waterston | 2000 | | | | | | | | | | | | | | | | | | | | | | | | 1 |
| Stan Villani | Ron Leibman | 2001 | | | | | | | | | | | | | | | | | | | | | | | | 4 |
| Liz Donnelly (Note: Previously bureau chief assistant district attorney; later served as a judge.) | Judith Light | 2008 | | | | | | | | | | | | | | | | | | | | | | | | 1 |
| Sonya Paxton | Christine Lahti | 2009–2011 | | | | | | | | | | | | | | | | | | | | | | | | 7 |
| David Haden | Harry Connick Jr. | 2012 | | | | | | | | | | | | | | | | | | | | | | | | 4 |

=== Assistant district attorneys ===
| Character | Cast | Years | Seasons | | | | | | | | | | | | | | | | | | | | | | | # Eps |
| Character | Cast | Years | 1 | 2 | 3 | 4 | 5 | 6 | 7 | 8 | 9 | 10 | 11 | 12 | 13 | 14 | 15 | 16 | 17 | 18 | 19 | 20 | 21 | 22 | 23 | # Eps |
|---|---|---|---|---|---|---|---|---|---|---|---|---|---|---|---|---|---|---|---|---|---|---|---|---|---|---|
| Abbie Carmichael (Note: Crossover from Law & Order.) | Angie Harmon | 1999–2000 | | | | | | | | | | | | | | | | | | | | | | | | 6 |
| Erica Alden | Reiko Aylesworth | 2000 | | | | | | | | | | | | | | | | | | | | | | | | 3 |
| Kathleen Eastman | Jenna Stern | 2000 | | | | | | | | | | | | | | | | | | | | | | | | 2 |
| Fritz | Albert Jones | 2007–2009 | | | | | | | | | | | | | | | | | | | | | | | | 2 |
| Kristen Torres | Lizette Carrión | 2008–2009 | | | | | | | | | | | | | | | | | | | | | | | | 2 |
| Kendra Gill (Note: Later served as a defense attorney.) | Gretchen Egolf | 2009–2010 | | | | | | | | | | | | | | | | | | | | | | | | 2 |
| Jo Marlowe | Sharon Stone | 2010 | | | | | | | | | | | | | | | | | | | | | | | | 4 |
| Sherri West | Francie Swift | 2010–2011 | | | | | | | | | | | | | | | | | | | | | | | | 4 |
| Gillian Hardwicke | Melissa Sagemiller | 2010–2011 | | | | | | | | | | | | | | | | | | | | | | | | 10 |
| Rose Calliar | Tabitha Holbert | 2011–2017 | | | | | | | | | | | | | | | Recurring | Recurring | Recurring | Recurring | | | | | | 7 |
| Pippa Cox | Jessica Phillips | 2013–2016 | | | | | | | | | | | | | | Recurring | Recurring | Recurring | Recurring | | | | | | | 7 |
| Derek Strauss | Greg Germann | 2013–2014 | | | | | | | | | | | | | | | | | | | | | | | | 3 |
| Kenneth O'Dwyer | Robert Sean Leonard | 2015–2016 | | | | | | | | | | | | | | | | | | | | | | | | 3 |

=== Trial division chiefs ===
| Character | Cast | Years | Seasons | | | | | | | | | | | | | | | | | | | | | | | | | | # Eps |
| Character | Cast | Years | 1 | 2 | 3 | 4 | 5 | 6 | 7 | 8 | 9 | 10 | 11 | 12 | 13 | 14 | 15 | 16 | 17 | 18 | 19 | 20 | 21 | 22 | 23 | 24 | 25 | 26 | # Eps |
|---|---|---|---|---|---|---|---|---|---|---|---|---|---|---|---|---|---|---|---|---|---|---|---|---|---|---|---|---|---|
| Lorraine Maxwell | Betty Buckley | 2021–2023 | | | | | | | | | | | | | | | | | | | | | | | Recurring | Recurring | | | 7 |

=== Defense attorneys ===
| Character | Cast | Years | Seasons | | | | | | | | | | | | | | | | | | | | | | | | | | # Eps |
| Character | Cast | Years | 1 | 2 | 3 | 4 | 5 | 6 | 7 | 8 | 9 | 10 | 11 | 12 | 13 | 14 | 15 | 16 | 17 | 18 | 19 | 20 | 21 | 22 | 23 | 24 | 25 | 26 | # Eps |
|---|---|---|---|---|---|---|---|---|---|---|---|---|---|---|---|---|---|---|---|---|---|---|---|---|---|---|---|---|---|
| Don Newvine | Frank Deal | 1999–2001 | | | | | | | | | | | | | | | | | | | | | | | | | | | 5 |
| James Woodrow | Craig Wroe | 2000–2007 | Recurring | Recurring | Recurring | | | | | | | | | | | | | | | | | | | | | | | | 9 |
| Ms. Regal | Liz Larsen | 2000–2002 | | | | | | | | | | | | | | | | | | | | | | | | | | | 3 |
| Milton Schoenfeld | Rob Bartlett | 2000–2002 | Recurring | Recurring | Recurring | Recurring | | | | | | | | | | | | | | | | | | | | | | | 6 |
| Roger Kressler | Ned Eisenberg | 2001–2019 | | | Recurring | Recurring | Recurring | Recurring | Recurring | Recurring | | Recurring | Recurring | Recurring | Recurring | Recurring | | | | | | | | | | | | | 22 |
| Carolyn Maddox | CCH Pounder | 2001–2010 | | | | | | | | | | | | | | | | | | | | | | | | | | | 5 |
| Cleo Conrad | JillMarie Lawrence | 2002–2008 | | | Recurring | Recurring | Recurring | Recurring | Recurring | Recurring | Recurring | | | | | | | | | | | | | | | | | | 17 |
| Trevor Langan | Peter Hermann | 2002–2022 | | | Recurring | Recurring | Recurring | Recurring | Recurring | Recurring | Recurring | Recurring | Recurring | Recurring | | | | | | | | | | | | | | | 35 |
| Gina Bernardo | Illeana Douglas | 2002–2003 | | | | | | | | | | | | | | | | | | | | | | | | | | | 3 |
| Morton Berger | Michael Lerner | 2003–2006 | | | | | | | | | | | | | | | | | | | | | | | | | | | 2 |
| Barry Moredock (Note: Later served as a judge.) | John Cullum | 2003–2007 | | | | | | | Recurring | Recurring | Recurring | | | | | | | | | | | | | | | | | | 6 |
| Donna Emmett | Viola Davis | 2003–2008 | | | | | | | | Recurring | Recurring | Recurring | | | | | | | | | | | | | | | | | 7 |
| Lorna Scarry | Mariette Hartley | 2003–2011 | | | | Recurring | Recurring | Recurring | | | | | | | | | | | | | | | | | | | | | 6 |
| Nikki Staines | Callie Thorne | 2003–2021 | | | | | | | | | | | | | | | | | | Recurring | Recurring | Recurring | | | | | | | 8 |
| Rebecca Balthus | Beverly D'Angelo | 2003–2008 | | | | | | | | | | | | | | | | | | | | | | | | | | | 5 |
| Lionel Granger | David Thornton | 2003–2010 | | | | | Recurring | Recurring | Recurring | Recurring | | | | | | | | | | | | | | | | | | | 10 |
| Dave Seaver (Note: Crossover from Law & Order.) | Michael Boatman | 2003–2011 | | | | | Recurring | Recurring | Recurring | | | | | | | | | | | | | | | | | | | | 7 |
| Lynne Riff | Blair Brown | 2004 | | | | | | | | | | | | | | | | | | | | | | | | | | | 2 |
| Chauncey Zierko | Peter Riegert | 2004–2007 | | | | | Recurring | Recurring | Recurring | Recurring | Recurring | | | | | | | | | | | | | | | | | | 7 |
| Oliver Gates | Barry Bostwick | 2004–2007 | | | | | Recurring | Recurring | Recurring | Recurring | | | | | | | | | | | | | | | | | | | 5 |
| Linden Delroy | J. Paul Nicholas | 2005–2012 | | | | | | Recurring | Recurring | Recurring | Recurring | Recurring | Recurring | Recurring | Recurring | | | | | | | | | | | | | | 12 |
| Sophie Devere | Annie Potts | 2005–2009 | | | | | | | | | | | | | | | | | | | | | | | | | | | 4 |
| Heshi Horowitz | Joe Grifasi | 2005–2013 | | | | | | | Recurring | Recurring | Recurring | Recurring | | | | | | | | | | | | | | | | | 9 |
| Charlie Moss | James Naughton | 2006–2007 | | | | | | | | | | | | | | | | | | | | | | | | | | | 2 |
| Matthew Braden | Steven Weber | 2007 | | | | | | | | | | | | | | | | | | | | | | | | | | | 3 |
| Russell Hunter | Austin Lysy | 2007–2011 | | | | | | | | | Recurring | Recurring | Recurring | Recurring | | | | | | | | | | | | | | | 7 |
| Miranda Pond | Alex Kingston | 2009–2010 | | | | | | | | | | Recurring | Recurring | Recurring | | | | | | | | | | | | | | | 4 |
| Patrice Larue | Jeri Ryan | 2009–2010 | | | | | | | | | | | | | | | | | | | | | | | | | | | 3 |
| Dwight Stannich | Robert Klein | 2009–2012 | | | | | | | | | | Recurring | Recurring | Recurring | Recurring | | | | | | | | | | | | | | 4 |
| John Buchanan | Delaney Williams | 2010–2020 | | | | | | | | | | | | | Recurring | Recurring | Recurring | Recurring | Recurring | Recurring | | | | | | | | | 14 |
| Marvin Exley | Ron Rifkin | 2011–2014 | | | | | | | | | | | | | | | | | | | | | | | | | | | 6 |
| Bayard Ellis | Andre Braugher | 2011–2015 | | | | | | | | | | | | | | | | | | | | | | | | | | | 6 |
| Linus Tate | David Pittu | 2011–2014 | | | | | | | | | | | | | Recurring | Recurring | Recurring | | | | | | | | | | | | 6 |
| Sofia Crane | Jacqueline Hendy | 2012–2015 | | | | | | | | | | | | | | | | | | | | | | | | | | | 6 |
| Kendra Gill (Note: Previously served as assistant district attorney.) | Gretchen Egolf | 2012 | | | | | | | | | | | | | | | | | | | | | | | | | | | 2 |
| Barry Querns | Reg E. Cathey | 2012–2013 | | | | | | | | | | | | | | | | | | | | | | | | | | | 4 |
| Lorenzo Desappio | Jason Cerbone | 2012–2016 | | | | | | | | | | | | | | Recurring | Recurring | Recurring | Recurring | | | | | | | | | | 8 |
| Rita Calhoun | Elizabeth Marvel | 2012– | | | | | | | | | | | | | | Recurring | Recurring | Recurring | Recurring | Recurring | | | | | | | | | 15 |
| Martha Marron | Renée Elise Goldsberry | 2013–2014 | | | | | | | | | | | | | | | | | | | | | | | | | | | 3 |
| Minonna Efron | Nia Vardalos | 2013–2023 | | | | | | | | | | | | | | | | | | | | | | | | | | | 4 |
| Lester Cohen | Jeffrey Tambor | 2013–2014 | | | | | | | | | | | | | | | | | | | | | | | | | | | 4 |
| Vanessa Mayer | Lauren Ambrose | 2013 | | | | | | | | | | | | | | | | | | | | | | | | | | | 2 |
| Mickey D'Angelo | Joseph Lyle Taylor | 2015–2022 | | | | | | | | | | | | | | | | Recurring | Recurring | Recurring | | | | | | | | | 6 |
| Arlene Heller | Susie Essman | 2015–2018 | | | | | | | | | | | | | | | | | | | | | | | | | | | 4 |
| Sunil Varma | Hari Dhillon | 2015–2016 | | | | | | | | | | | | | | | | Recurring | Recurring | Recurring | | | | | | | | | 4 |
| Dara Miglani | Mouzam Makkar | 2018–2022 | | | | | | | | | | | | | | | | | | | | | | | | | | | 4 |
| William Biegel | Richard Kind | 2018–2019 | | | | | | | | | | | | | | | | | | | | | | | | | | | 3 |
| Elana Barth (Note: Previously served as a judge.) | Jenna Stern | 2019–2022 | | | | | | | | | | | | | | | | | | | | | | | | | | | 4 |
| April Andrews | Erin Anderson | 2019– | | | | | | | | | | | | | | | | | | | | | | | | Recurring | Recurring | Recurring | 9 |
| Lisa Turner | Paige Jennifer Barr | 2019– | | | | | | | | | | | | | | | | | | | | | | | | | | | 7 |
| Art Blumfeld | Jeffrey Schecter | 2019–2025 | | | | | | | | | | | | | | | | | | | | | | | Recurring | Recurring | Recurring | | 6 |
| Stephen Cryer | Eric Kirchberger | 2021–2022 | | | | | | | | | | | | | | | | | | | | | | | | | | | 3 |
| Jericho Swope | Julian Elijah Martinez | 2021–2022 | | | | | | | | | | | | | | | | | | | | | | | | | | | 3 |
| Steven Felder | Eric Aschenbrenner | 2021–2022 | | | | | | | | | | | | | | | | | | | | | | | | | | | 2 |
| Elaine Samuels | Frances Turner | 2022–2023 | | | | | | | | | | | | | | | | | | | | | | | | | | | 4 |
| Mason Carter | Robbie Williams | 2022– | | | | | | | | | | | | | | | | | | | | | | | | Recurring | Recurring | Recurring | 5 |
| Harris Malone | Brian Cade | 2023– | | | | | | | | | | | | | | | | | | | | | | | | Recurring | Recurring | Recurring | 7 |
| Kingston Giddens | Asa James | 2023– | | | | | | | | | | | | | | | | | | | | | | | | Recurring | Recurring | Recurring | 4 |

=== Judges ===
| Characters | Cast | Years | Seasons | | | | | | | | | | | | | | | | | | | | | | | | | | # Eps |
| Characters | Cast | Years | 1 | 2 | 3 | 4 | 5 | 6 | 7 | 8 | 9 | 10 | 11 | 12 | 13 | 14 | 15 | 16 | 17 | 18 | 19 | 20 | 21 | 22 | 23 | 24 | 25 | 26 | # Eps |
|---|---|---|---|---|---|---|---|---|---|---|---|---|---|---|---|---|---|---|---|---|---|---|---|---|---|---|---|---|---|
| Alan Ridenour | Harvey Atkin | 2000–2011 | Recurring | Recurring | Recurring | Recurring | Recurring | | | | | Recurring | Recurring | Recurring | | | | | | | | | | | | | | | 18 |
| Susan Valdera | Leslie Ayvazian | 2000–2002 | Recurring | Recurring | Recurring | Recurring | | | | | | | | | | | | | | | | | | | | | | | 5 |
| Kevin Beck | Peter Francis James | 2000 | | | | | | | | | | | | | | | | | | | | | | | | | | | 5 |
| Margaret Barry (Note: Crossover from Law & Order.) | Doris Belack | 2000–2001 | | | | | | | | | | | | | | | | | | | | | | | | | | | 3 |
| Mark Seligman | Tom O'Rourke | 2000–2006 | | Recurring | Recurring | Recurring | Recurring | Recurring | Recurring | | | | | | | | | | | | | | | | | | | | 19 |
| Lena Petrovsky | Joanna Merlin | 2000–2011 | | Recurring | Recurring | Recurring | Recurring | Recurring | Recurring | Recurring | Recurring | Recurring | Recurring | Recurring | | | | | | | | | | | | | | | 43 |
| Arthur Cohen | David Lipman | 2002–2009 | | | Recurring | Recurring | Recurring | Recurring | | Recurring | Recurring | Recurring | | | | | | | | | | | | | | | | | 13 |
| Ruth Linden | Jayne Houdyshell | 2002–2017 | | | | | | | | | | | | | | Recurring | Recurring | Recurring | | | | | | | | | | | 10 |
| Danielle Larsen | Sheila Tousey | 2003–2004 | | | | Recurring | Recurring | Recurring | | | | | | | | | | | | | | | | | | | | | 10 |
| Lois Preston | Audrie J. Neenan | 2002–2011 | | | | Recurring | Recurring | Recurring | Recurring | | Recurring | Recurring | Recurring | Recurring | | | | | | | | | | | | | | | 21 |
| Walter Bradley | Peter McRobbie | 2003–2012 | | | | | Recurring | Recurring | Recurring | Recurring | Recurring | Recurring | | Recurring | Recurring | Recurring | | | | | | | | | | | | | 18 |
| Mary Clark | Marlo Thomas | 2004 | | | | | | | | | | | | | | | | | | | | | | | | | | | 4 |
| Philip Wyler | William Whitehead | 2004 | | | | | | | | | | | | | | | | | | | | | | | | | | | 2 |
| Joseph Terhune | Philip Bosco | 2004–2006 | | | | | | | | | | | | | | | | | | | | | | | | | | | 5 |
| Karen Taten | Patricia Kalember | 2004–2010 | | | | | | Recurring | Recurring | Recurring | Recurring | | | | | | | | | | | | | | | | | | 9 |
| Liz Donnelly (Note: Previously served as bureau chief assistant district attorney.) | Judith Light | 2005–2010 | | | | | | | Recurring | Recurring | Recurring | Recurring | Recurring | Recurring | | | | | | | | | | | | | | | 13 |
| Heshi Horowitz (Note: Previously served as a defense attorney.) | Joe Grifasi | 2015–2021 | | | | | | | | | | | | | | | | | | | Recurring | Recurring | Recurring | | | | | | 5 |
| Peter Harrison | Peter Gerety | 2007–2013 | | | | | | | | | | | | | | | | | | | | | | | | | | | 4 |
| Gregory Trenton | John Henry Cox | 2007–2010 | | | | | | | | | | | | | | | | | | | | | | | | | | | 2 |
| Barry Moredock | John Cullum | 2008–2011 | | | | | | | | | | Recurring | Recurring | Recurring | | | | | | | | | | | | | | | 5 |
| Linda Maskin | Tonye Patano | 2009– | | | | | | | | | | | | | | | | | | | | | | | | | | | 7 |
| D. Andrews | Lindsay Crouse | 2009–2011 | | | | | | | | | | Recurring | Recurring | Recurring | | | | | | | | | | | | | | | 7 |
| Sylvia Quinn | Kate Nelligan | 2010 | | | | | | | | | | | | | | | | | | | | | | | | | | | 2 |
| Sheila Tripler | Anita Gillette | 2010 | | | | | | | | | | | | | | | | | | | | | | | | | | | 2 |
| D. Serani | Michael Mastro | 2011– | | | | | | | | | | | | | Recurring | Recurring | Recurring | Recurring | Recurring | Recurring | Recurring | Recurring | Recurring | Recurring | Recurring | Recurring | Recurring | Recurring | 29 |
| Elana Barth (Note: Later served as a defense attorney.) | Jenna Stern | 2011-2019 | | | | | | | | | | | | | Recurring | Recurring | Recurring | Recurring | Recurring | Recurring | Recurring | Recurring | | | | | | | 13 |
| Karyn Blake | Ami Brabson | 2012– | | | | | | | | | | | | | Recurring | Recurring | Recurring | Recurring | Recurring | Recurring | Recurring | Recurring | Recurring | Recurring | Recurring | Recurring | Recurring | Recurring | 23 |
| Colin McNamara | Stephen C. Bradbury | 2012– | | | | | | | | | | | | | Recurring | Recurring | Recurring | Recurring | Recurring | Recurring | | | Recurring | Recurring | Recurring | Recurring | Recurring | Recurring | 32 |
| V. Hayes | Sharon Washington | 2012–2016 | | | | | | | | | | | | | | | | | | | | | | | | | | | 4 |
| Gloria Pepitone | Sonia Manzano | 2013–2020 | | | | | | | | | | | | | | Recurring | Recurring | Recurring | Recurring | Recurring | Recurring | | | | | | | | 10 |
| Felicia Catano | Aida Turturro | 2013–2023 | | | | | | | | | | | | | | Recurring | Recurring | Recurring | Recurring | | | Recurring | Recurring | Recurring | Recurring | Recurring | | | 15 |
| Delilah Hawkins | Victoria Rowell | 2013–2014 | | | | | | | | | | | | | | | | | | | | | | | | | | | 2 |
| Edward Kofax | John Rothman | 2014–2019 | | | | | | | | | | | | | | | Recurring | Recurring | Recurring | Recurring | Recurring | | | | | | | | 5 |
| Al Bertuccio | Vincent Curatola | 2015–2020 | | | | | | | | | | | | | | | | | Recurring | Recurring | Recurring | Recurring | | | | | | | 6 |
| Anita Wright | Mary E. Hodges | 2015– | | | | | | | | | | | | | | | | | Recurring | Recurring | Recurring | Recurring | | | | | | | 9 |
| Lisa Peck | Barbara Miluski | 2016–2019 | | | | | | | | | | | | | | | | | | Recurring | Recurring | Recurring | | | | | | | 6 |
| Roberta Martinez | Olga Merediz | 2017– | | | | | | | | | | | | | | | | | | Recurring | Recurring | Recurring | Recurring | Recurring | | | | | 6 |
| Joe Ellery | Rocco Sisto | 2019–2021 | | | | | | | | | | | | | | | | | | | | | | | | | | | 3 |

=== Medical experts ===
| Character | Cast | Years | Seasons | | | | | | | | | | | | | | | | | | | | | | | | | | # Eps |
| Character | Cast | Years | 1 | 2 | 3 | 4 | 5 | 6 | 7 | 8 | 9 | 10 | 11 | 12 | 13 | 14 | 15 | 16 | 17 | 18 | 19 | 20 | 21 | 22 | 23 | 24 | 25 | 26 | # Eps |
|---|---|---|---|---|---|---|---|---|---|---|---|---|---|---|---|---|---|---|---|---|---|---|---|---|---|---|---|---|---|
| Elizabeth Rodgers (Note: Crossover from Law & Order.) | Leslie Hendrix | 1999–2000 | | | | | | | | | | | | | | | | | | | | | | | | | | | 9 |
| Elizabeth Olivet | Carolyn McCormick | 1999–2018 | | | | | | | | | | | | | | | | | | | | | | | | | | | 6 |
| Emil Skoda | J. K. Simmons | 2000–2001 | | | | | | | | | | | | | | | | | | | | | | | | | | | 6 |
| Emily Sopher | Linda Emond | 2004–2014 | | | | | | | | | | | | | | | | | | | | | | | | | | | 7 |
| Rebecca Hendrix | Mary Stuart Masterson | 2004–2007 | | | | | | | | | | | | | | | | | | | | | | | | | | | 5 |
| Cap Jackson | Jeremy Irons | 2011 | | | | | | | | | | | | | | | | | | | | | | | | | | | 2 |
| Peter Lindstrom | Bill Irwin | 2013–2022 | | | | | | | | | | | | | | | Recurring | Recurring | Recurring | Recurring | | | Recurring | Recurring | Recurring | | | | 17 |
| Carl Rudnick | Jefferson Mays | 2014–2016 | | | | | | | | | | | | | | | | | | | | | | | | | | | 7 |
| Abel Truman | Frank Wood | 2020–2024 | | | | | | | | | | | | | | | | | | | | | | Recurring | Recurring | Recurring | Recurring | | 10 |

=== Hospital personnel ===
| Character | Cast | Years | Seasons | | | | | | | | | | | | | | | | | | | | | | | | | | # Eps |
| Character | Cast | Years | 1 | 2 | 3 | 4 | 5 | 6 | 7 | 8 | 9 | 10 | 11 | 12 | 13 | 14 | 15 | 16 | 17 | 18 | 19 | 20 | 21 | 22 | 23 | 24 | 25 | 26 | # Eps |
|---|---|---|---|---|---|---|---|---|---|---|---|---|---|---|---|---|---|---|---|---|---|---|---|---|---|---|---|---|---|
| Paramedic Martinez | Joselin Reyes | 2003–2016 | | | | | Recurring | Recurring | Recurring | Recurring | | | | | | | Recurring | Recurring | Recurring | | | | | | | | | | 19 |
| Dr. Anne Morella | Julie White | 2003–2007 | | | | | | | | | | | | | | | | | | | | | | | | | | | 5 |
| Nurse Carey Hutchins | Elizabeth Flax | 2003–2012 | | | | | Recurring | Recurring | Recurring | Recurring | Recurring | Recurring | | | | | | | | | | | | | | | | | 13 |
| Dr. Kyle Beresford | Stephen Gregory | 2004–2011 | | | | | Recurring | Recurring | Recurring | Recurring | Recurring | Recurring | Recurring | Recurring | | | | | | | | | | | | | | | 18 |
| Dr. Sloane | Betsy Aidem | 2005–2022 | | | | | | | | | | | | | | | | | | | | Recurring | Recurring | Recurring | Recurring | | | | 9 |
| Dr. Jane Larom | Anne James | 2006–2011 | | | | | | | | Recurring | Recurring | Recurring | Recurring | Recurring | | | | | | | | | | | | | | | 9 |
| Dr. Manning | Amir Arison | 2009–2011 | | | | | | | | | | Recurring | Recurring | Recurring | | | | | | | | | | | | | | | 8 |
| Dr. Darby Wilder | Yvonna Kopacz-Wright | 2014– | | | | | | | | | | | | | | | | Recurring | Recurring | Recurring | Recurring | Recurring | Recurring | Recurring | | | Recurring | Recurring | 13 |
| Rudy Syndergaard | Stephen Wallem | 2019– | | | | | | | | | | | | | | | | | | | | | Recurring | Recurring | Recurring | | Recurring | Recurring | 8 |

=== The Stabler family ===
Members of the Stabler family also appear in Law & Order: Organized Crime.

| Character | Cast | Years | Seasons | | | | | | | | | | | | | | | | | | | | | | | | | | # Eps |
| Character | Cast | Years | 1 | 2 | 3 | 4 | 5 | 6 | 7 | 8 | 9 | 10 | 11 | 12 | 13 | 14 | 15 | 16 | 17 | 18 | 19 | 20 | 21 | 22 | 23 | 24 | 25 | 26 | # Eps |
|---|---|---|---|---|---|---|---|---|---|---|---|---|---|---|---|---|---|---|---|---|---|---|---|---|---|---|---|---|---|
| Kathy Stabler | Isabel Gillies | 1999–2021 | Recurring | Recurring | Recurring | Recurring | Recurring | Recurring | | Recurring | Recurring | Recurring | Recurring | Recurring | | | | | | | | | | | | | | | 32 |
| Maureen Stabler | Erin Broderick | 1999–2007 | Recurring | Recurring | Recurring | | | | | | | | | | | | | | | | | | | | | | | | 13 |
| Kathleen Stabler | Holiday Segal (S1), Allison Siko (S3–23) | 1999–2021 | | | | | | Recurring | Recurring | Recurring | Recurring | Recurring | | | | | | | | | | | | | | | | | 24 |
| Dickie Stabler | Jeffrey Scaperrotta | 1999–2021 | | | | | | | | | | | | | | | | | | | | | | | | | | | 19 |
| Lizzie Stabler | Patricia Cook | 1999–2007 | | | | | | | | | | | | | | | | | | | | | | | | | | | 13 |
| Elliot Stabler Jr. | Nicky Torchia (S23), Various (S9-12) | 2008–2021 | | | | | | | | | Recurring | Recurring | Recurring | Recurring | | | | | | | | | | | | | | | 6 |
| Bernadette Stabler | Ellen Burstyn | 2008 | | | | | | | | | | | | | | | | | | | | | | | | | | | 1 |

=== The Rollins family ===
| Character | Cast | Years | Seasons | | | | | | | | | | | | | | | | | | | | | | | | | | # Eps |
| Character | Cast | Years | 1 | 2 | 3 | 4 | 5 | 6 | 7 | 8 | 9 | 10 | 11 | 12 | 13 | 14 | 15 | 16 | 17 | 18 | 19 | 20 | 21 | 22 | 23 | 24 | 25 | 26 | # Eps |
|---|---|---|---|---|---|---|---|---|---|---|---|---|---|---|---|---|---|---|---|---|---|---|---|---|---|---|---|---|---|
| Kim Rollins | Lindsay Pulsipher | 2012–2020 | | | | | | | | | | | | | | | | | | | | | | | | | | | 5 |
| Jesse Rollins | Charlotte and Vivian Cabell | 2016– | | | | | | | | | | | | | | | | | Recurring | Recurring | Recurring | Recurring | Recurring | Recurring | Recurring | Recurring | Recurring | Recurring | 22 |
| Billie Rollins | Various, Beatrice Mallow | 2019– | | | | | | | | | | | | | | | | | | | | | | | | Recurring | Recurring | Recurring | 9 |
| Jim Rollins | James Morrison | 2020–2021 | | | | | | | | | | | | | | | | | | | | | | | | | | | 2 |

=== The Benson family ===
| Character | Cast | Years | Seasons | | | | | | | | | | | | | | | | | | | | | | | | | | # Eps |
| Character | Cast | Years | 1 | 2 | 3 | 4 | 5 | 6 | 7 | 8 | 9 | 10 | 11 | 12 | 13 | 14 | 15 | 16 | 17 | 18 | 19 | 20 | 21 | 22 | 23 | 24 | 25 | 26 | # Eps |
|---|---|---|---|---|---|---|---|---|---|---|---|---|---|---|---|---|---|---|---|---|---|---|---|---|---|---|---|---|---|
| Noah Porter-Benson | Skylar and Bradley Dubow, Jack Nawada-Braunwart, Ryan Buggle | 2014– | | | | | | | | | | | | | | | Recurring | Recurring | Recurring | Recurring | Recurring | Recurring | Recurring | Recurring | Recurring | Recurring | Recurring | Recurring | 66 |

=== The Tutuola family ===
| Character | Cast | Years | Seasons | | | | | | | | | | | | | | | | | | | | | | | | | | # Eps |
| Character | Cast | Years | 1 | 2 | 3 | 4 | 5 | 6 | 7 | 8 | 9 | 10 | 11 | 12 | 13 | 14 | 15 | 16 | 17 | 18 | 19 | 20 | 21 | 22 | 23 | 24 | 25 | 26 | # Eps |
|---|---|---|---|---|---|---|---|---|---|---|---|---|---|---|---|---|---|---|---|---|---|---|---|---|---|---|---|---|---|
| Ken Randall | Ernest Waddell | 2004–2021 | | | | | | Recurring | Recurring | Recurring | | | | | | | | | | | | | | | | | | | 10 |

== Minor characters ==
=== Brian Cassidy ===
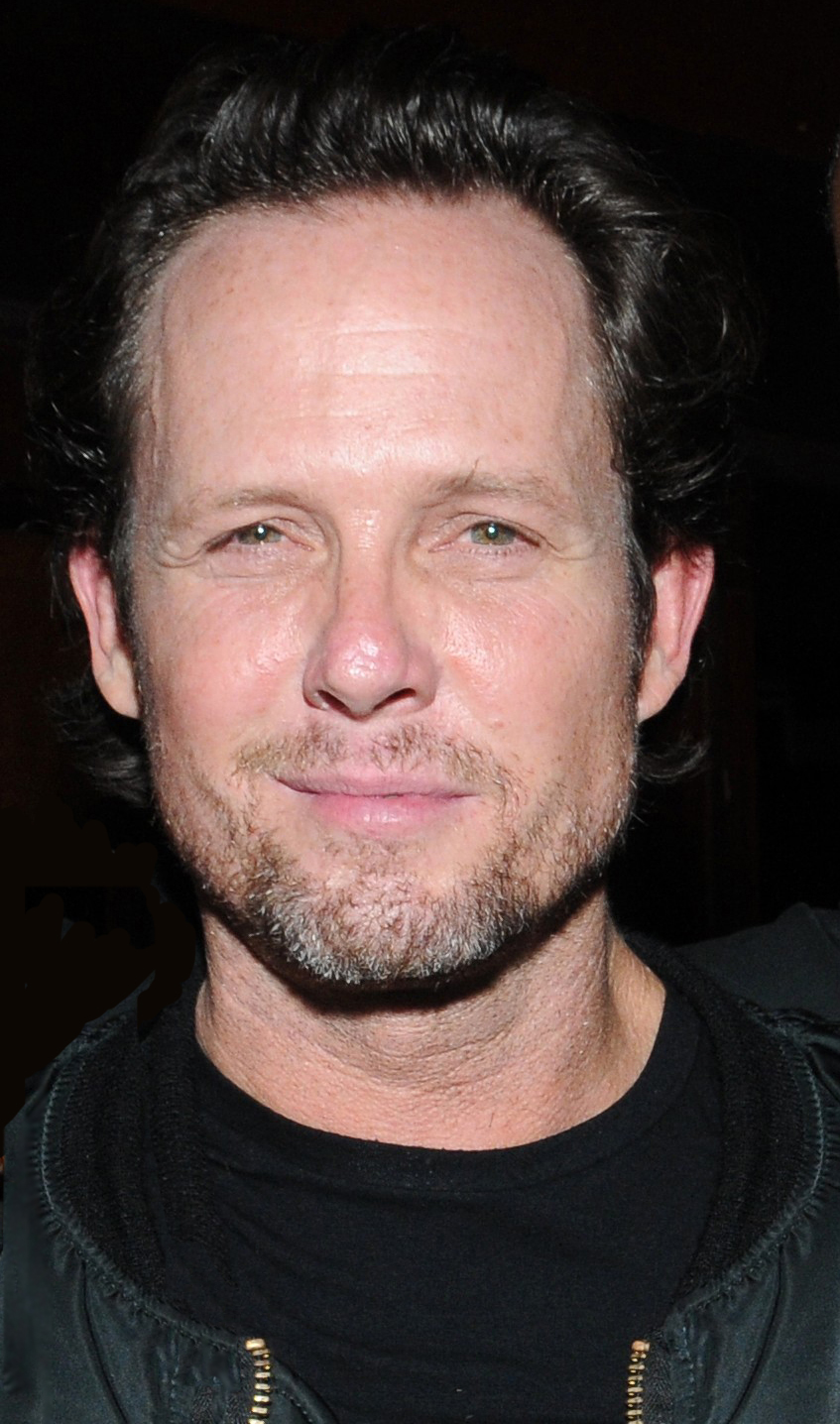
Brian Cassidy was portrayed by Dean Winters from 1999 to 2000 and 2012 to 2014.

- Portrayed by Dean Winters
- Episodes: "Payback" – "Disrobed", "Rhodium Nights" – "Above Suspicion", "Undercover Blue", "Her Negotiation" – "Downloaded Child", "Gone Fishin'" – "Chasing Demons"

Brian Cassidy is a detective in the SVU during the series' first season. The youngest and least experienced member of the precinct, he has a genuine desire to put rapists and child molesters in prison, but lacks the professional detachment necessary to deal with the often grisly sex crimes. He often has trouble concealing his anger and revulsion toward the cases he investigates and this creates friction between him and his colleagues, made worse when they poke fun at his relative lack of sophistication. A genuinely talented and driven police detective, he makes a real effort to learn from the other members of the precinct, particularly Munch, whom he thinks of as a sort of older brother/mentor figure. He has a brief affair with Olivia Benson, and has trouble dealing with her after the relationship ends. Cassidy was written out of the show midway through the first season. Cragen sends him to interview a young girl who was repeatedly raped and brutalized, causing Cassidy to realize that he cannot emotionally handle the types of crimes that a SVU detective must deal with on a daily basis. Cragen then offers to assist Cassidy with a transfer to another department, narcotics.

After a twelve-year absence from the show, Cassidy returns in the season 13 finale, "Rhodium Nights". He is working undercover as security personnel for Bart Ganzel, the owner of an escort service. When Amaro and Rollins go to speak to Ganzel, Cassidy confronts Amaro and punches him in the face. After Cassidy is arrested, he is in the interrogation room with Amaro when Benson walks in and sarcastically greets her old colleague, explaining to Amaro how Cassidy worked SVU in another "century." Cassidy agrees to help them as long as they don't blow his cover. After Cassidy helps SVU get insight on the war between Ganzel and an opposing escort service, he has to play both sides of the law as he refuses to sacrifice his three years of undercover work. In the season 14 premiere, Bureau Chief ADA Paula Foster reveals to Detective Benson that Cassidy is working undercover for her. Benson, along with Cassidy's former SVU partner Sergeant Munch, meets with him on two different occasions to get information on the escort war. When Benson goes to Ganzel's loft to speak with Cassidy again, they walk outside to what appears to be an attempted theft of Ganzel's car. Benson gives chase to one person, while Cassidy and the car thief pull guns on each other. A patrol car pulls up, and two officers draw their weapons, as Cassidy identifies himself as police. As Benson returns to identify herself as police, the patrol officer shoots Cassidy twice. Benson calls for a bus and rides with him to the hospital, where he survives, as the bullets missed his main arteries. It is discovered that the officer who shot him was contracted by Ganzel to shoot Cassidy after Ganzel found the bugs that the DA's office had installed in his loft. Later, Cassidy and Benson share a kiss in his hospital room after Benson tells him she isn't the same person he knew years ago. In the episode, "Undercover Blue", Cassidy is accused of rape by a prostitute while he was undercover almost four years prior. It is revealed that Cassidy is being set up by the woman and her boss to make money off a lawsuit against the NYPD and the charges are dropped. Also in this episode, Munch says that Cassidy paid the price for having a relationship with a prostitute while undercover with Ganzel, as he was demoted from detective to an officer who works nights at a Bronx courthouse. Benson and Cassidy also are forced to reveal their romantic relationship in this episode when Amaro and Munch go to Cassidy's apartment and find Benson there.

=== Captain Ed Tucker ===
- Portrayed by Robert John Burke
- Episodes: "Counterfeit" – "The Longest Night of Rain"

Ed Tucker is an officer in the Internal Affairs Bureau of the NYPD who has frequently been assigned to question the SVU squad whenever there is an allegation of misconduct. He has appeared in 21 episodes throughout the duration of the series, starting with the season 3 episode "Counterfeit". He has opened numerous investigations on Detectives Stabler, Benson, Amaro, and Rollins and frequently feuded with Captain Cragen. Tucker was originally introduced as a sergeant, but was later promoted to lieutenant. Although he feuded with the squad for many years, Tucker slowly became an ally for Benson after she took over for Cragen as squad commander. In the season 16 finale, "Surrendering Noah", he alerted Benson that 1PP would likely not consider promoting Amaro to Sergeant now that Benson, who looks to become SVU's Lieutenant, will need a Sergeant by her side. In "Townhouse Incident" (season 17), Tucker—who has now been named the Captain of IAB—acts as the hostage negotiator when Benson and others are taken captive in a violent home invasion; he is selected at Benson's request and reveals that he was a negotiator prior to transferring to IAB. When Tucker tries to help Benson bust a sex trafficking ring with ties to the Catholic Church (and his own cousin, a priest), it is revealed that he and Benson are in a romantic relationship. In "Heartfelt Passages", Tucker tells Benson of his intention to transfer to the NYPD Emergency Response Unit's Hostage Negotiation Team.

As seen in "Heartfelt Passages", Capt. Tucker is a recipient of the U.S. Flag Bar, the World Trade Center Breast Bar, NYPD Meritorious Police Duty, NYPD Excellent Police Duty, and NYPD 150th Commemorative Breast Bar.

In Season 18, Tucker wanted Benson to retire with him. Benson had mixed feelings about this. The two eventually ended their romantic relationship. In Season 21, he made a guest appearance, where he is shown to be retiring. Tucker has remarried, and has two stepdaughters. Tucker privately reveals to Benson he is dying of lung cancer, that has metastasized to his brain, causing memory loss. After Vice Officer Rachel Wilson blames Tucker for ignoring her rape at the hands of Internal Affairs Officer Gary Wald before her suicide, Tucker records a confession from Wald to make things right. Tucker also reconciles with Benson. However, before the trial, Tucker commits suicide, wanting to spare his wife from suffering due to his terminal cancer.

=== Captain Declan Murphy ===
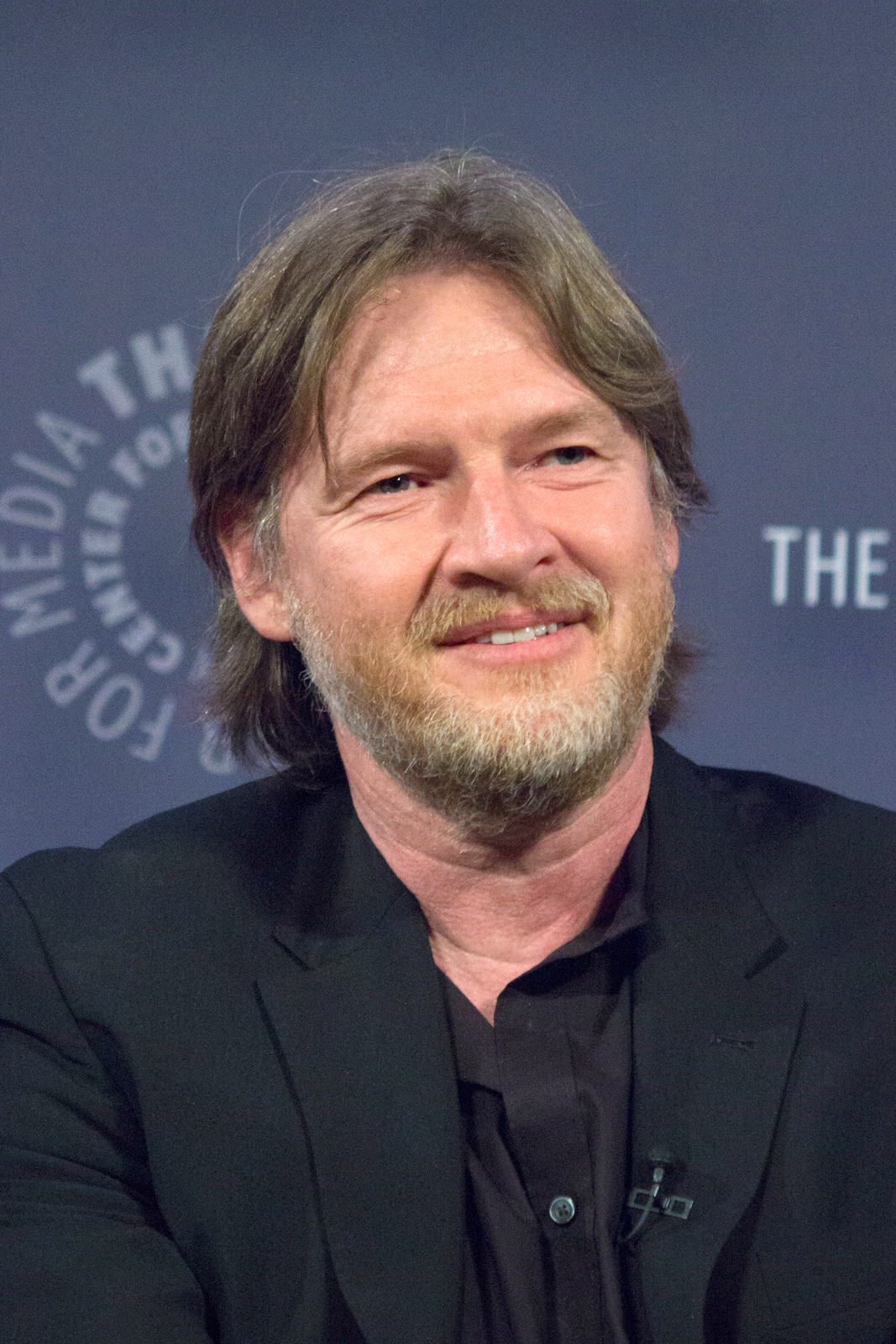
Declan G. Murphy has been portrayed by Donal Logue from 2014 to 2015.

- Portrayed by Donal Logue
- Episodes: "Gambler's Fallacy", "Beast's Obsession" – "Spring Awakening", "Undercover Mother", "Community Policing", "Silent Night, Hateful Night"

Captain Declan G. Murphy is first introduced working as an undercover cop who meets Rollins when she's on a gambling binge. Shortly after William Lewis escapes from prison, One Police Plaza appoints Murphy commanding officer of Manhattan SVU, deeming it inappropriate for Benson to lead the manhunt to recapture Lewis. Murphy's reign as commanding officer continues after Lewis's suicide at the request of One Police Plaza. Murphy is a by-the-book CO, often checking behind the detectives' backs that they are apprehending suspects correctly, and he often uses his undercover expertise to lead the direction of investigations. Murphy's strictness often causes him to butt heads with the detectives, mainly Amaro, who does not trust him. Morally, Murphy has shown himself to be flexible. When Benson faces perjury charges after Lewis's suicide, Murphy lies under oath to persuade the grand jury to dismiss, saying that Benson did what she had to do to save the girl Lewis had kidnapped. However, when Amaro is arrested for his assault on a photographer investigated for child pornography and building a torture chamber, Murphy tells Amaro that he knows Amaro doesn't value his advice, but to stand down and keep quiet, regardless of the circumstances. After the charges are dismissed, Murphy tells Benson he will do what he can, but that he would not pull strings for Amaro, as he is unconvinced that Amaro's career is worth saving. At the end of "Spring Awakening", Murphy tells Benson that he has been chosen for an undercover assignment and recommended to One Police Plaza that command of the SVU be returned to her. Subsequently, in the episode "Undercover Mother", Murphy's undercover assignment is revealed after SVU takes down a sex trafficking ring.

In the seventeenth-season episode "Community Policing", Murphy returns after finding out about Rollins' pregnancy while he was "4,000 miles away in Serbia trying to take down a sex trafficking ring." Rollins reveals to Murphy that he is in fact the father of her child. Upon hearing this, Murphy lets her know that he is now here to stay, albeit temporarily; however, he gives Rollins a secret cell number, and tells her that should she need him, he will be on a plane within an hour.

In the twenty-third season, it is revealed Murphy has been promoted to Captain of the Hate Crimes Division. In his reappearance, it is revealed that he has not been active in Jessie's life and laments this. During a joint investigation with SVU, he speaks with Rollins and tries to reconcile with her so he could be in their daughter's life, but Rollins is uncomfortable with this.

=== Deputy Chief William Dodds ===
- Portrayed by Peter Gallagher
- Episodes: "Holden's Manifesto", "Pornstar's Requiem", "Pattern Seventeen", "Forgiving Rollins", "Institutional Fail", "Maternal Instincts"

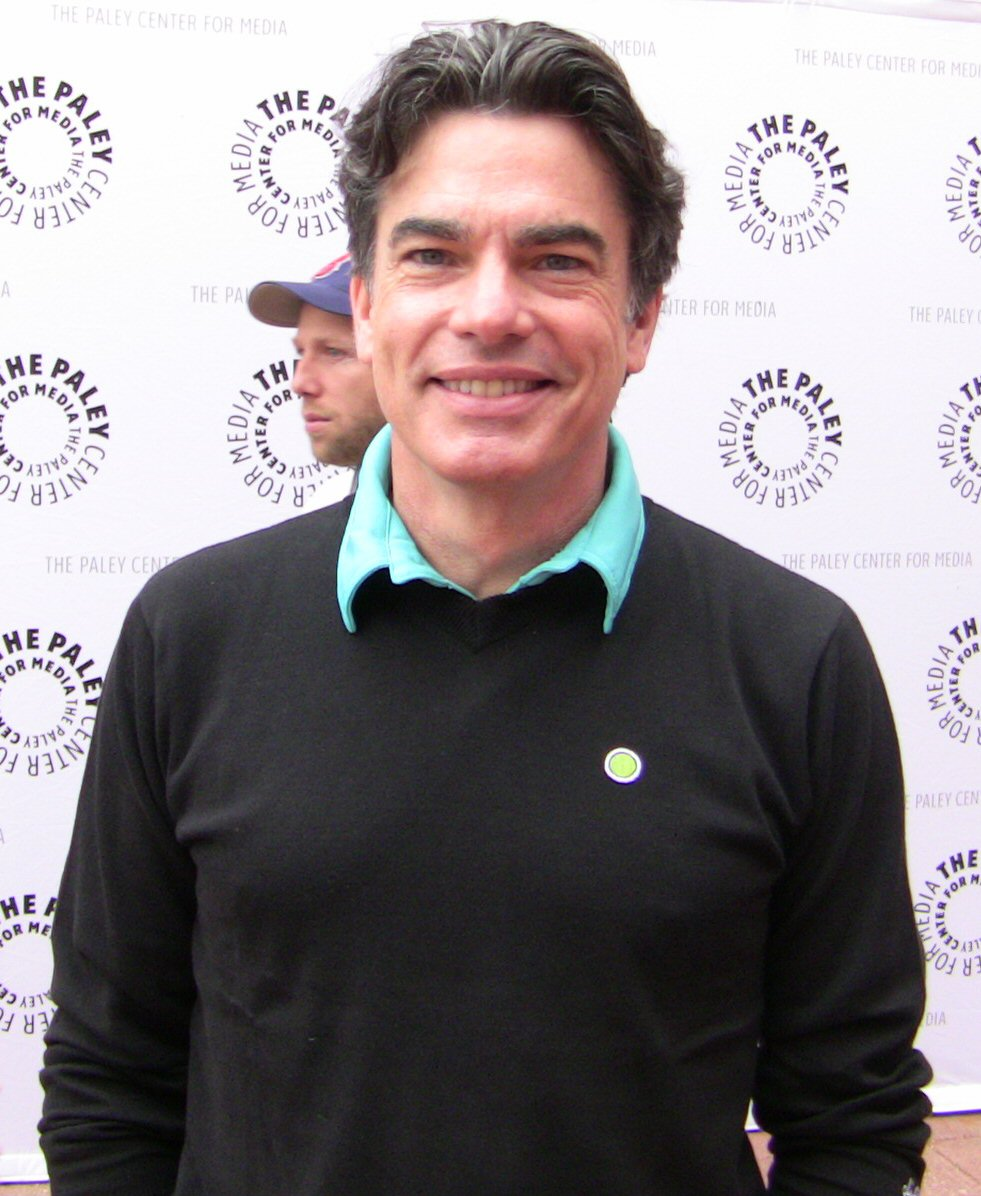
Peter Gallagher portrays Deputy Chief William Dodds, the tough-as-nails head of all the Special Victims Units in New York City.

The former Deputy Chief of the Special Victims Units in all five boroughs, Dodds is Sergeant (later Lieutenant) Benson's politically savvy commanding officer. A former homicide detective, he is often hard on Benson and her squad, most notably during their early interactions, but ultimately respects the work that they do and frequently backs them up to the NYPD brass. He assisted the squad during their investigation into Atlanta PD Deputy Chief Charles Patton (Harry Hamlin), who was accused of assaulting one of his own detectives in a New York City hotel, by personally interviewing Patton in the interrogation room. In season 17, he names his son, Mike (Andy Karl), Manhattan SVU's new sergeant, and is devastated by his death in a domestic violence dispute between a corrupt corrections officer (Brad Garrett) and his wife.

As seen in "Heartfelt Passages", Dep. Chf. Dodds is a recipient of the US Flag Bar.

Dodds is currently the first major character in any Law & Order series to portray an NYPD officer holding the rank of deputy chief. Almost every prior portrayal of NYPD senior officers above the rank of captain has been that of three-star bureau chiefs, the four-star chief of department or first deputy commissioner, or the commissioner of the NYPD.

In the season 21 premiere he was reassigned to the Staten Island Traffic and Safety Task Force, but not before insisting that Benson be promoted to the rank of captain. However, he states he would be back.

=== Sergeant Mike Dodds ===
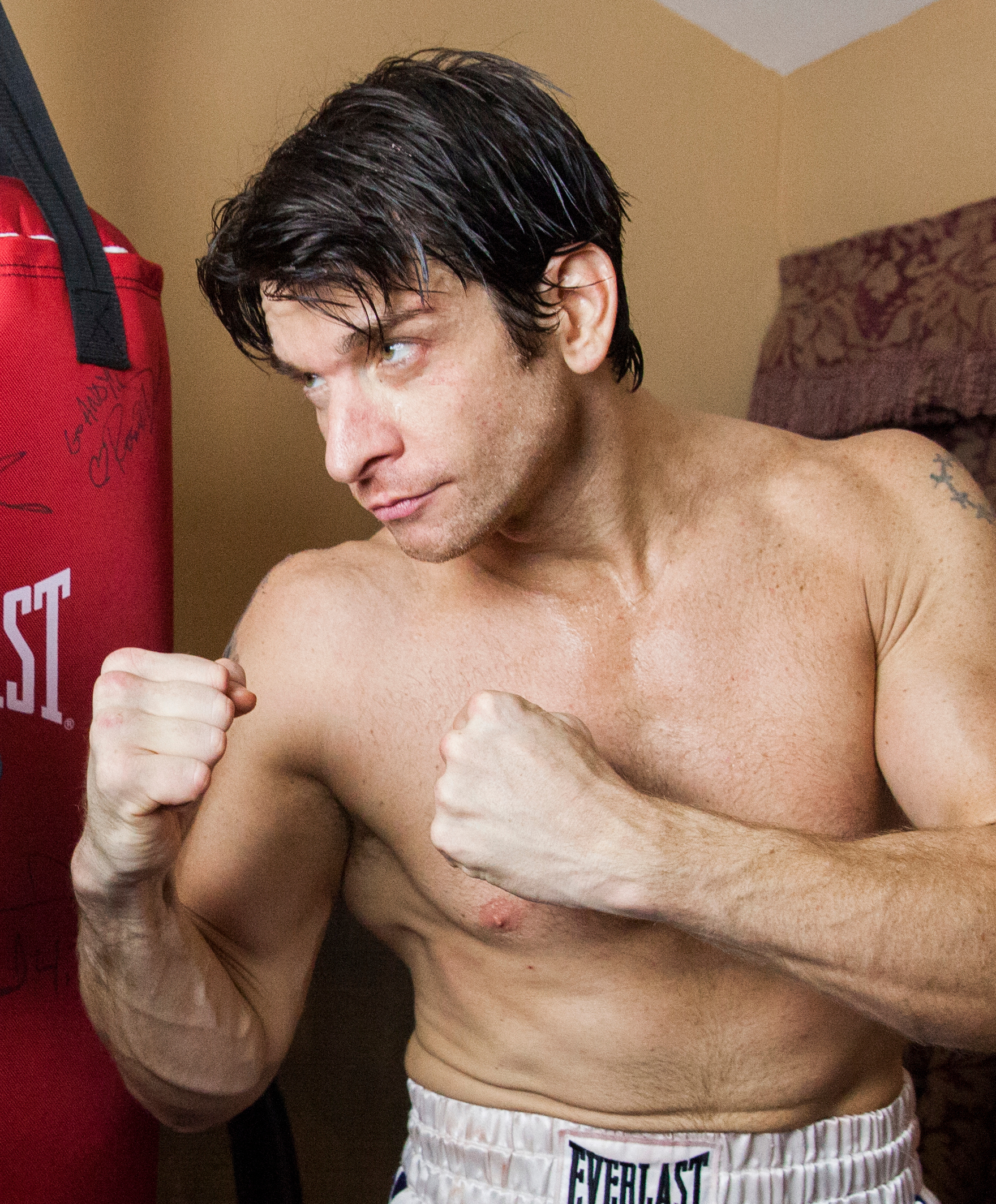
Mike Dodds was portrayed by Andy Karl from 2015 to 2016.

- Portrayed by Andy Karl
- Episodes: "Maternal Instincts" – "Heartfelt Passages"

Sergeant Mike Dodds is introduced in the season 17 episode, "Maternal Instincts", as the son of Deputy Chief William Dodds (Peter Gallagher), who transfers to the 16th Precinct to serve as Lieutenant Benson's second-in-command. He is a war veteran, having enlisted after 9/11 and served in Special Forces. Immediately prior to his transfer, Dodds worked Anti-Crime, and before that, he worked out of the 71st Precinct. Dodds is a consummate professional and devoted to his work; as a result, he takes some time to warm up to his new colleagues but he gradually comes to respect and like them. He is shot in the line of duty while pursuing serial killer Dr. Gregory Yates in upstate New York but eventually recovers. Only a few months into his tenure, he is offered a position with the Joint Terrorism Task Force by his father but decides to stay with SVU, boldly going against the Deputy Chief's wishes (the elder Dodds had meant for his son's time at SVU to be nothing more than a career step). In "Manhattan Transfer", Dodds is made Acting Commander of SVU after Lt. Olivia Benson is relieved of her duties. In the subsequent episode, Dodds leads SVU's continued investigation into a sex trafficking ring while continuing to consult Benson. He happily returns command of SVU back over to Benson after the case is closed. In "Heartfelt Passages", Dodds is shot in the stomach during a hostage situation. He makes it through surgery, but he later suffers a stroke in the ICU and is put on life support. After its determined that Dodds is brain dead, he is taken off life support and dies. Both Chief Dodds and the entire SVU squad were devastated by his death and Olivia Benson suffers from survivor's guilt. It is shown a few months after the tragic event that the Deputy Chief still holds Olivia responsible for what happened to his son. As Olivia herself admits, "he's not wrong".

As seen in "Heartfelt Passages", Sgt. Dodds is a recipient of the US Flag Bar, World Trade Center Breast Bar, NYPD Meritorious Police Duty, NYPD Excellent Police Duty, and NYPD 150th Commemorative Breast Bar.

=== TARU Tech Ruben Morales ===
- Portrayed by Joel de la Fuente
- Episodes: "Surveillance" – "Bully"

Ruben Morales is an officer in the NYPD's Technical Assistance Response Unit who aided the SVU squad with investigations that included computer or video evidence. He appeared in 52 episodes between seasons 3–12. In the Season 7 episode "Web", Morales takes a hands on approach in the investigation of an Internet pornography site. Due to his own guilt about his nephew's rape by an online predator, Morales beats one of the suspects up in the interrogation room, threatening the detectives' case.

=== CSU Tech Ryan O'Halloran ===
- Portrayed by Mike Doyle
- Episodes: "Choice" – "Zebras"

Crime Scene Technician Ryan O'Halloran came in frequent contact with the SVU detectives when they investigated crime scenes of their victims. He appeared in 52 episodes between seasons 5–10. He was one of SVU's biggest allies until his death in the season 10 finale. He was murdered by CSU tech Dale Stuckey, who was trying to prevent O'Halloran from informing the detectives that he was the real killer of a defense attorney and young woman.

=== Emil Skoda ===
- Portrayed by J. K. Simmons
- Episodes: "The Third Guy", "Wrong is Right", "Honor", "Legacy", "Noncompliance", "Folly"

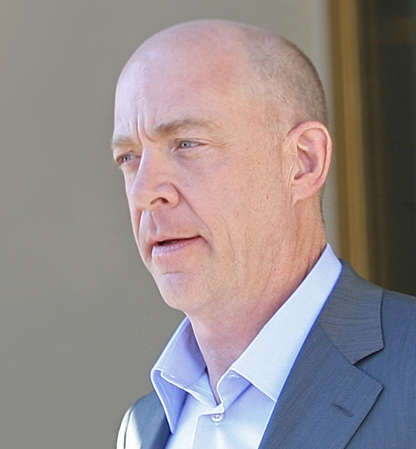
Emil Skoda was portrayed by J. K. Simmons from 2000 to 2001.

Emil Skoda is a psychiatrist who works with the New York Police Department. In addition to his own private practice, he often testifies for the prosecution as an expert witness on whether a defendant is legally sane to stand trial. He also profiles suspects and offers advice to the District Attorneys regarding witnesses' and suspects' mental states. While originally appearing in Law & Order from 1997 until 2010 in 44 episodes, and later in Criminal Intent in 2002 for only a single episode, he also appears in SVU, once in the first season "The Third Guy", before making recurring appearances in the following season, ending until "Folly".

Unlike his predecessor, Dr. Elizabeth Olivet, little has been revealed about Skoda's personal life. One exception occurs in the episode "Burned", in which he compares a teenage suspect to his own son and admits that he enjoys rollerblading and Nintendo.

Skoda is also far more skeptical of defendants pleading insanity than Olivet, and quicker to believe they were faking to avoid prison. In more than one episode, both Skoda and Olivet are hired to evaluate a suspect, and argue over the appropriate diagnosis. The two doctors have radically different training and education: Olivet is a clinical psychologist with a Ph.D. earned through graduate studies and a research-based dissertation; whereas Skoda is a physician, a doctor of medicine specializing in psychiatry. Skoda also has differences in philosophy with Captain Donald Cragen, with whom he argued passionately on cases.

As has often taken place in the Law & Order franchise, Simmons first appeared as a different character—Jerry Luppin in the Season 4 episode "Sanctuary" as a guest appearance. Simmons also played another character in Law & Order continuity—Colonel Alexander Rausch in the Homicide: Life on the Street Season 4 episode "For God and Country", a continuation of the Law & Order Season 6 episode "Charm City".

=== Elizabeth Rodgers ===
- Portrayed by Leslie Hendrix
- Episodes: "Payback" – "Misleader"

Dr. Elizabeth Rodgers was a recurring character in the Law & Order franchise. She was the medical examiner on SVU throughout the first season and has since been replaced by Dr. Melinda Warner. She also had a recurring role on Law & Order and Law & Order: Criminal Intent and appeared in one episode of Law & Order: Trial by Jury and Exiled: A Law & Order Movie.

=== Rebecca Hendrix ===
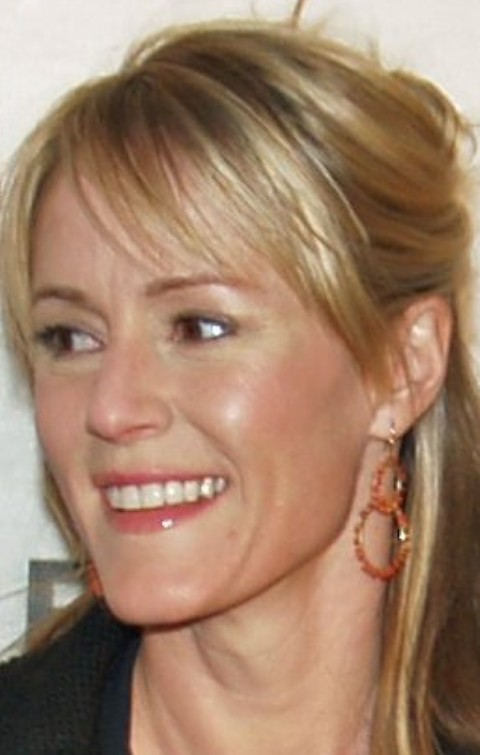
Rebecca Hendrix was portrayed by Mary Stuart Masterson from 2004 to 2006.

- Portrayed by Mary Stuart Masterson
- Episodes: "Weak", "Contagious", "Identity", "Ripped", "Philadelphia"

Dr. Rebecca Hendrix is a former police officer who was at the police academy with Detective Benson. She left the force to become a psychiatrist. She initially appears for three episodes in the series' sixth season, to replace series regular BD Wong while he was performing in Broadway's Pacific Overtures. Within the series, it is said that Wong's character George Huang is on special assignment with the FBI back in Washington. Neal Baer stated that the character also gave him an opportunity to introduce a conflict between Benson and Stabler and said "Stabler hasn't always felt warmly toward psychiatry, but he does warm up to this character—who has been both a cop and a shrink."

Masterson reprises the role in the seventh-season episode, "Ripped", where she helps Detective Stabler come to terms with unresolved issues in what Baer called "an emotionally devastating scene". She makes a final appearance in the eighth season, episode "Philadelphia".

=== FBI Agent Shannah Sykes ===
- Portrayed by Jordana Spiro
- Episodes: "Zone Rouge" – "Marauder"

FBI Agent Shannah Sykes is an FBI agent who is temporarily assigned to SVU on loan. Benson described her as an "East Coast expert on child abduction." Though a loyal FBI agent, when Sykes was young, her sister was kidnapped, and years later was confirmed to have been murdered. Sykes would be put on loan to Benson's SVU squad after playing an important role in helping them rescue Maddie Flynn.

=== Elizabeth Donnelly ===
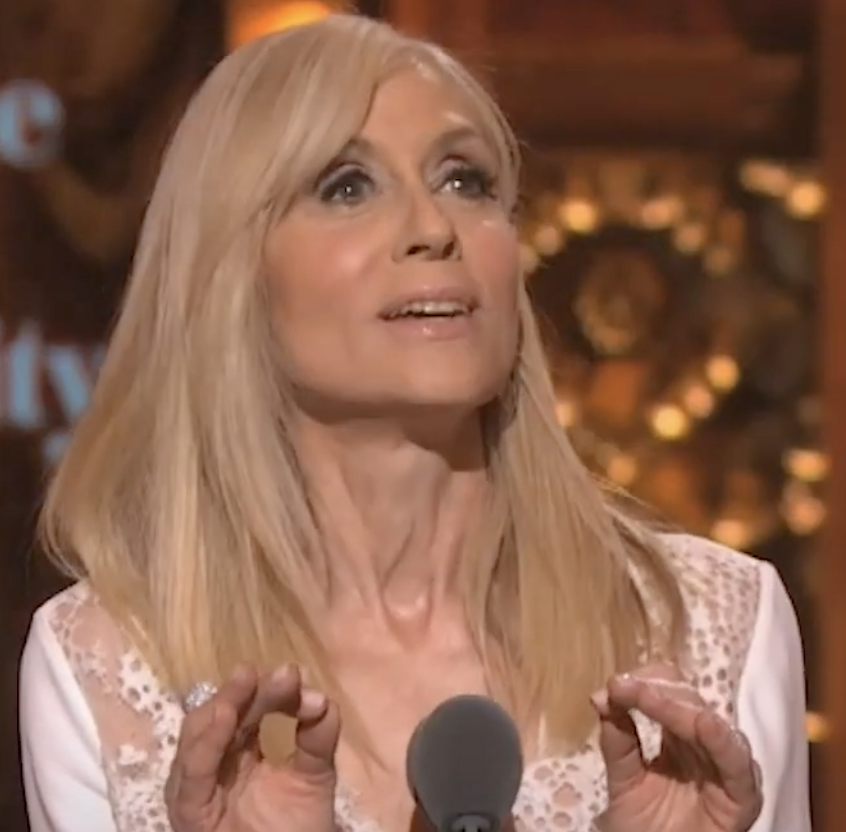
Elizabeth Donnelly was portrayed by Judith Light from 2002 to 2010.

- Portrayed by Judith Light
- Episodes: "Guilt" – "Cold", "Persona", "Zebras", "Behave"

Elizabeth Donnelly is SVU's Bureau Chief Assistant District Attorney from seasons 3 to 6. In the District Attorney's office, she serves as the supervisor for ADA Cabot and her successor Casey Novak. Donnelly is elevated to judge in season 7. In the season 10 episode "Persona", Donnelly takes a leave of absence from her role as a judge and resumes her previous role as an Executive ADA to prosecute a cold case she was involved with in 1974, when a battered woman (Brenda Blethyn) murdered her husband. She admits to Benson that she was somewhat responsible for the woman absconding from custody and therefore took on the case due to "unfinished business." Her role in the escape leads to mishaps in the justice system being termed "doing a Donnelly" for many years to follow. This episode calls attention to the difficulty Donnelly experiences as a woman working in the justice system. But the revelation that the fugitive had been pregnant at the time of her crime leads Donnelly to what, for her, is an act of leniency. She leaves the office, yet again, and returns to the role of a judge.

=== Michael Cutter ===
- Portrayed by Linus Roache
- Episodes: "Scorched Earth", "True Believers", "Lost Traveller", "Father's Shadow"

Executive ADA Michael Cutter from seasons 18-20 of Law & Order is promoted to Bureau Chief ADA of the Special Victims unit, where he is supervising ADAs Alexandra Cabot and Casey Novak. Both Cabot and Novak were previously supervised by Bureau Chief ADA Elizabeth Donnelly, before she was elevated to judgeship in season 7. The season 13 premiere, "Scorched Earth", was Cutter's first appearance on SVU, in which he helps Cabot with her prosecution of an Italian diplomat accused of raping a hotel maid.

In "True Believers", Cutter takes the lead in a case where a college music student (Sofia Vassilieva) is raped at gunpoint by a drug dealer. Defense attorney Bayard Ellis (Andre Braugher) accuses the NYPD of racially profiling the defendant, who is African-American, and reveals that Tutuola and Rollins frisked three identical suspects - all of which result in Cutter losing the case.

In the episode "Lost Traveller", ADA Cabot is forced to call on Cutter after defense attorney Marvin Exley (Ron Rifkin) tells her to "call her boss" to work out a deal for his client. In "Father's Shadow", Cutter is the lead prosecutor when a reality show producer named Fred Sandow (Michael McKean) is accused of raping young first-time actresses. Cutter's office does not drop the charges, even when the producer's son takes his father's girlfriend and her daughter hostage and demands that his father be set free.

=== Sonya Paxton ===
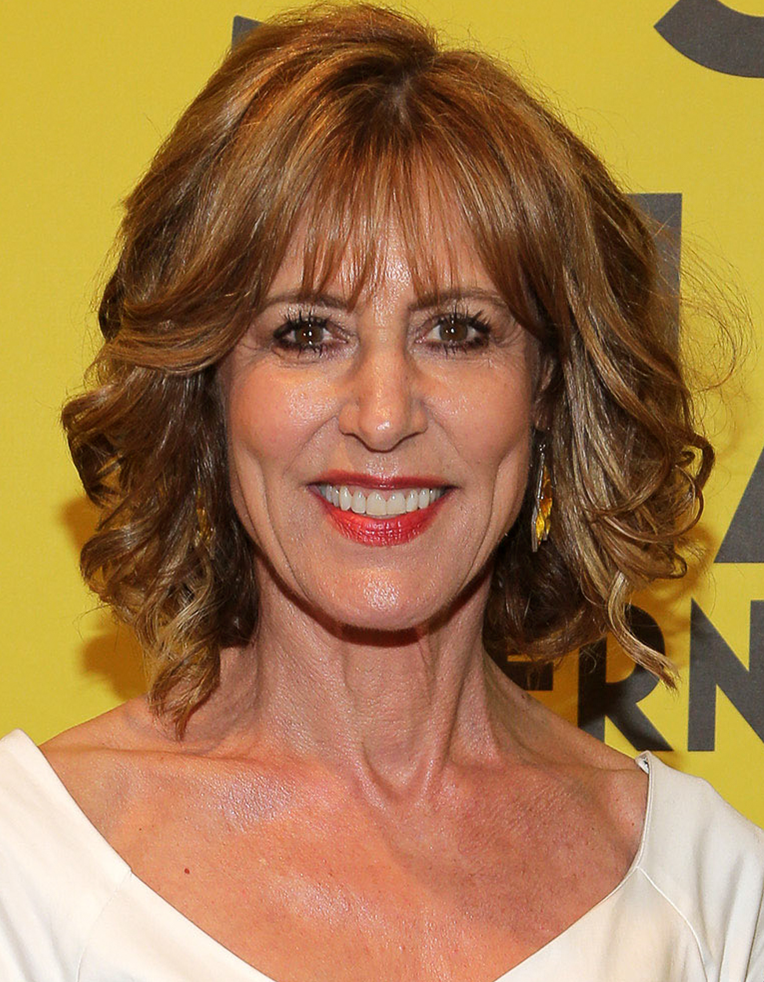
Sonya Paxton was portrayed by Christine Lahti from 2009 to 2011.

- Portrayed by Christine Lahti
- Episodes: "Unstable" – "Hammered", "Turmoil", "Gray", "Pursuit"

Sonya Paxton is SVU's Executive ADA who temporarily replaces Alexandra Cabot for four episodes in season 11, starting with the season premiere, "Unstable". Paxton works in the Manhattan District Attorney's office under the authority of Jack McCoy (Sam Waterston; Law & Order), as an Executive Assistant District Attorney. A member of the DA's office for over 25 years, she has a black-and-white view of the law, and makes sure all procedures are handled "by the book." Working in the appeals bureau, she was the first to get a capital conviction in New York when the then m-newly elected Governor George Pataki brought back the death penalty in 1995. McCoy sends Paxton to SVU to "clean house" in the "he-said, she-said unit" due to too many convictions being overturned. However, things start out rocky as she butts heads with the SVU team, particularly Detective Stabler. In the second episode "Sugar", she and Stabler get into a heated argument after Paxton calls the suspect's lawyer after he declines his right to counsel twice. In the fourth episode "Hammered", Paxton is prosecuting a case where a man drank heavily and murders the woman he met at the bar. The defense blames alcoholism for the murder during the trial. Intending to use a computer-generated video mockup of the crime, Paxton accidentally plays a version in which the defendant's face is superimposed onto the attacker. Paxton is embarrassed and meets Benson and Stabler at a bar where she is seen drinking. The following morning, she arrives 45 minutes late to the mistrial hearing, appearing distraught and blaming a "fender bender". Judge Barry Moredock (John Cullum) asks if she needed medical help, but the defendant points out that she is drunk. Moredock orders Benson to come with a breathalyzer, which reveals her blood alcohol level is .082, resulting in a mistrial. Moredock orders Paxton to seek treatment. At the end of the episode, she returns to the SVU precinct and apologizes to the team, stating that she intends on making amends to each and every one of them.

She later appears in the season 11 episode "Turmoil", meeting ADA Cabot outside the courtroom after Cabot discovers she is being investigated by the state bar. Paxton tells her to watch out for Benson and Stabler, because they are only loyal to each other.

In season 12, Paxton makes a surprise return to SVU and serves as the Executive ADA in the ninth episode ("Gray") to prove to the DA that she hasn't lost her 'winning ways'. Paxton and Stabler go at it again, with Stabler telling her to "go have a drink." In the seventeenth episode ("Pursuit"), she returns again to help an old friend, Alicia Harding (Debra Messing), who is being stalked. Paxton tells the SVU squad that she has been working to find Harding's missing sister for decades, as it was her case. She also tells them that she started drinking in part because she felt responsible for the killer having never been caught. She releases confidential case information to Harding, which puts Harding in danger. Benson and Tutuola go looking for Paxton at an Alcoholics Anonymous meeting to reprimand her for giving out the information. Benson makes a shocking discovery when entering the women's restroom – Paxton is bleeding to death on the floor. As Benson tries to help her, Paxton says "It's okay, I got him," and she dies in Benson's arms. M.E. Melinda Warner (Tamara Tunie) discovers a hair in Paxton's throat, which she got by biting her attacker—which ultimately helps solve the case.

I love her gray tones even though she pretends to be very by the book black and white; I love how just, you know, the complex gray tones in her character. I love her vulnerabilities and her underbelly that is pretty well hidden until the third and fourth episodes.

— Christine Lahti on what she likes most about Paxton

Christine Lahti was originally slated to guest-star in a single four episode-arc as Paxton while producers found a permanent replacement for outgoing ADA Cabot. Lahti could not commit to a permanent role, since she resides in Chicago, while filming of SVU takes place in New York City. SVU executive producer Neal Baer revealed that, "She's [Paxton] from Appeals and she's tired of having rape cases overturned because of misidentifications. She's coming to clean things up." She returns again in the eighth episode of that season to "clash" with Cabot.

According to Lahti, Paxton was originally written as a control freak, "needing to always be right and prove others wrong"—but behind this were Paxton's fears, insecurities, low self-esteem and an alcohol problem.

Lahti again returned to SVU for two episodes, in the series' twelfth season. In response to Lahti's return, Baer stated, "We're bringing back characters we love this season." Lahti's character was written out of the series by way of death; such is a rarity for those who work with the SVU team on the show, with only a few other characters encountering a similar fate, including CSU technician Ryan O'Halloran (Mike Doyle) in the tenth season, and Sergeant Mike Dodds (Andy Karl) in the seventeenth season.

TV Guide described the character as an "overbearing", "nasty" alcoholic. Myra Fleischer of the Washington Times labelled Lahti's character as a "bitchy alcoholic".

WPIX described Paxton as an "ADA with a dark side" who has "serious control issues and several skeletons in her closet". On the day of the airing of the episode "Hammered", Lahti stated that Paxton is the person that "everyone's loving to hate", and that hopefully the viewer's perception of her would change after the episode, sympathizing with the character's drinking problem.

Previously.TV, while noting the misleading representations of lawyers on television, commented on the realism of Paxton's alcoholism storyline, contending that it "could happen, as alcoholism among lawyers is an issue."

In an interview with HollywoodOutbreak.com, Lahti said she believed that her character struck a huge chord in the show, "...when those episodes were airing, everywhere I went, people came up to me and said how much they hate me", others approached Lahti and praised her, saying, "We love that you’re so mean to Stabler (Christopher Meloni). We’ve been waiting for someone to stand up to him."

=== David Haden ===
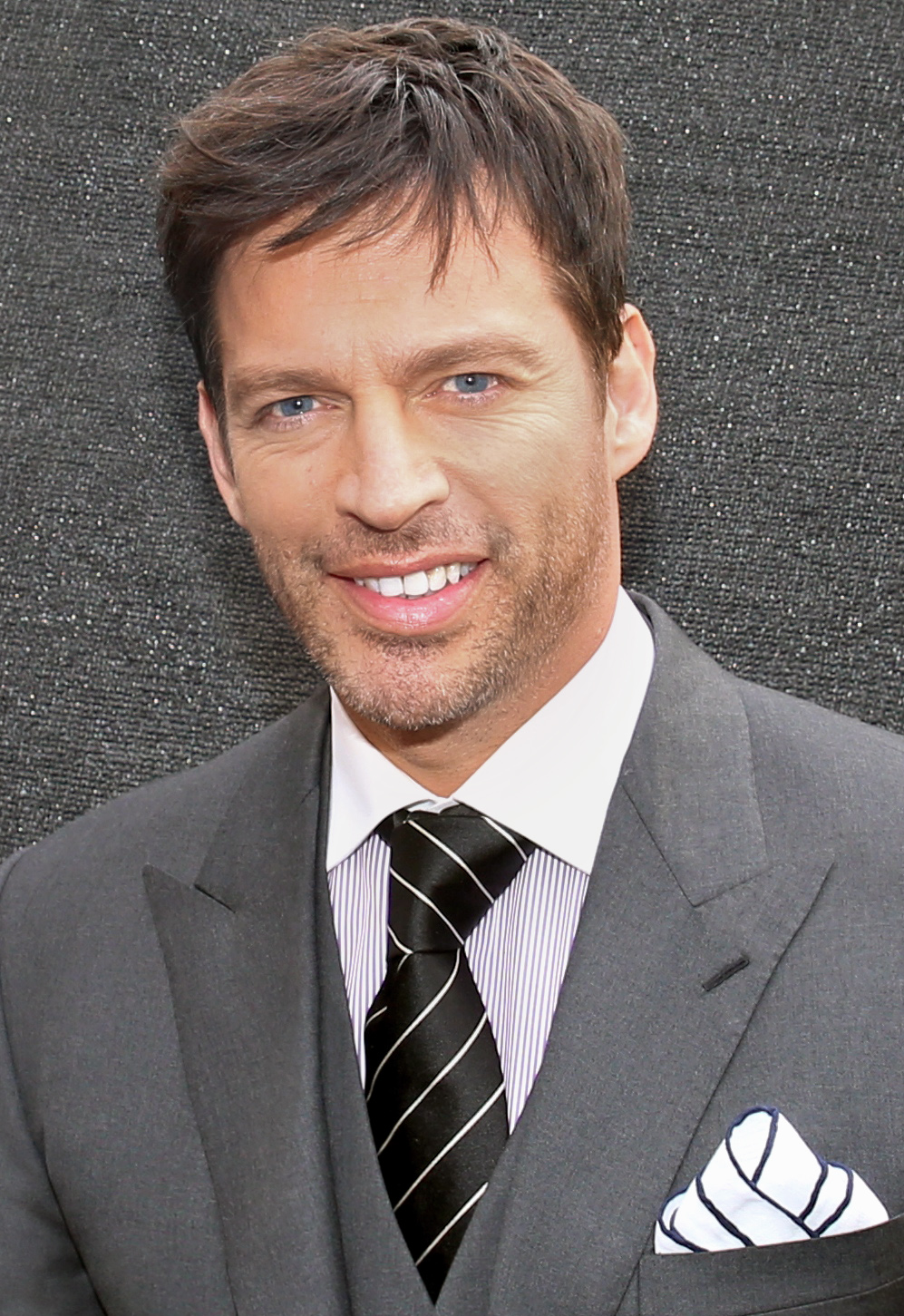
David Haden was portrayed by Harry Connick Jr. from 2011 to 2012.

- Portrayed by Harry Connick Jr.
- Episodes: "Official Story", "Father's Shadow", "Hunting Ground", "Justice Denied"

Executive Assistant District Attorney David Haden joins the show in the season 13, "Official Story", with a four-episode arc. Referred to as the executive assistant to the District Attorney, or the DA's "number two", Haden is a dedicated prosecutor who is assigned a case with Benson and the SVU squad when the CEO of a private military contractor is confronted by Occupy Wall Street protesters and later found drugged and sexually assaulted in a park. A much larger crime and conspiracy in Iraq is unveiled, with a rape occurring overseas and the rape kit being kept hidden. Haden and the SVU detectives are threatened by the CEO (John Doman), but Haden dismisses the threat, telling Benson, "This is what I live for." Although Benson is at first wary of Haden, they are both surprised to find they work well together. As the case develops, so does their relationship, as they share dinner and a kiss at the end of the episode.

In the following episode, "Father's Shadow", Haden offers to take Benson to dinner, but she respectfully declines, saying she is still on duty and joking there would be a possible conflict of interest. Later, Haden shows up at the scene of a hostage situation, in which Benson is trying to talk a teenage boy down from killing his younger sister. After Benson finally convinces the boy to give her the gun, Haden comforts her and offers to take her home. In "Hunting Ground", Haden and Benson's relationship becomes romantic as they work together to catch a serial killer; they are shown on a date and later sleeping together.

In "Justice Denied", Haden becomes involved in an SVU case in which it appears that Benson had coerced a confession out of a man eight years earlier and the real rapist is attacking women again. After defense attorney Bayard Ellis questions their relationship and threatens to expose them, Haden and Benson have to decide how they are going to handle the case without having their judgement clouded. At the end of the episode, after the real rapist has been caught and the wrongfully imprisoned man released, Cragen informs Benson that the District Attorney has decided to form a Conviction Integrity Unit to investigate past cases and ensure no one is wrongfully imprisoned. Cragen says that the DA's office will be starting with sex crimes, and that Haden has been appointed as the Bureau Chief of the unit. Benson and Haden meet for drinks and decide that they have to end their relationship and pretend like it never happened.

In the 13th-season finale episode, "Rhodium Nights", Defense Attorney Marvin Exley (Ron Rifkin) tells Benson that Haden may not be the person he claims to be, hinting that Haden is corrupt. It is revealed in the season 14 premiere that Haden's name came up on the wire tap in the investigation of an escort service. At the end of the episode, after several members of the DA's office are arrested for bribery and corruption, including Bureau Chief Paula Foster (Paget Brewster), Amaro tells Benson that Haden resigned from the office.

=== Jo Marlowe ===
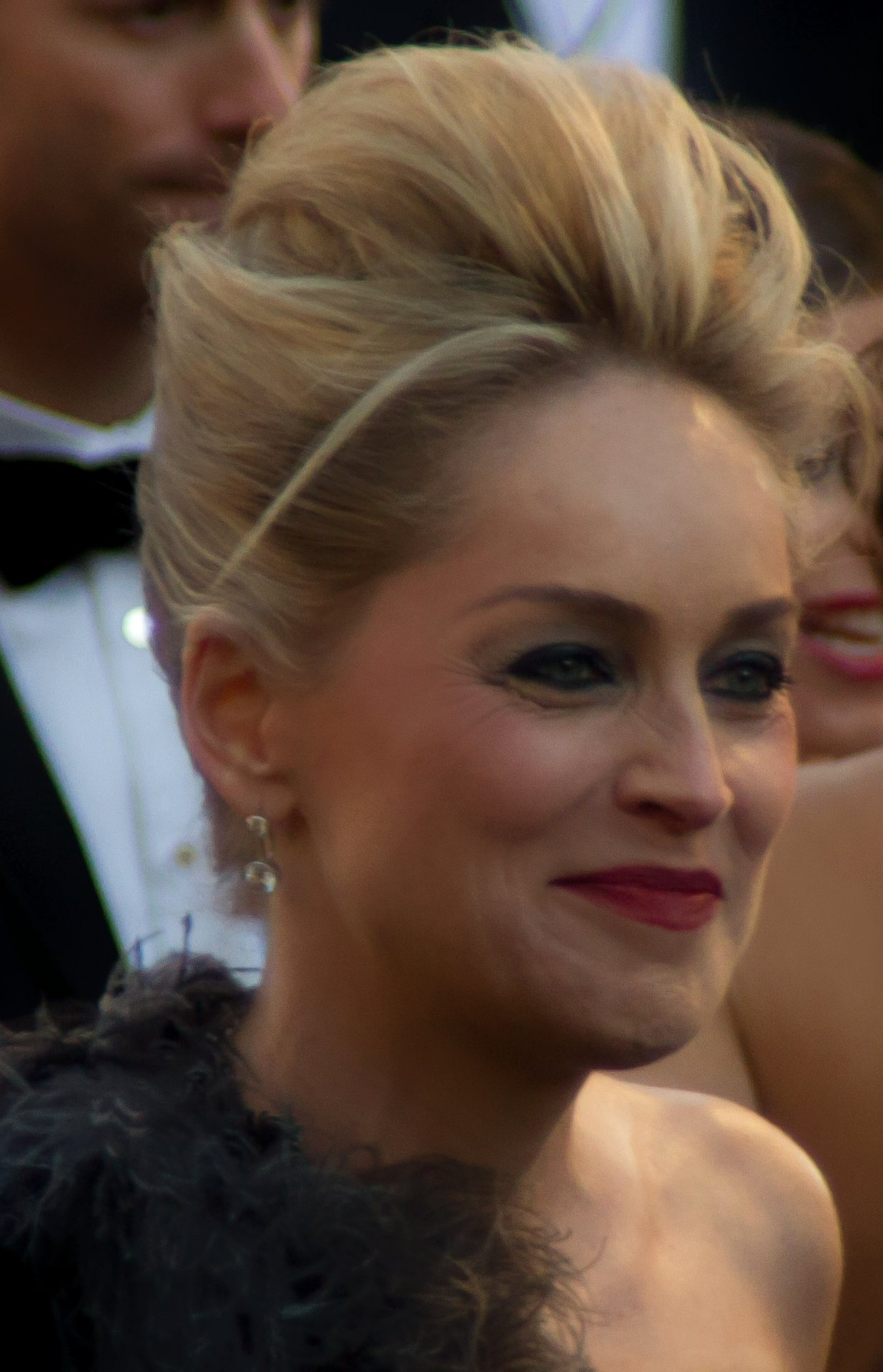
Jo Marlowe was portrayed by Sharon Stone in 2010.

- Portrayed by Sharon Stone
- Episodes: "Torch" – "Shattered"

ADA Jo Marlowe is drafted by DA Jack McCoy in season 11 after ADA Alexandra Cabot takes a leave of absence to help rape victims in the Congo. She is a former police lieutenant and Detective Stabler's partner approximately four years before he paired with Detective Benson. She first appears in the 21st episode of the season, "Torch", in which McCoy directs her to handle a case in which two young girls were killed in a fire. Stabler and Benson show up at the crime scene and Stabler is shocked to see his old partner and more surprised to know she now works for the DA's office. Benson believes Marlowe only took the job as SVU's ADA so that she could work with Stabler again.

In the following episode, "Ace", Marlowe and Captain Cragen clash over the way to handle a case in which a baby-trafficking ring is discovered and a young woman and her baby are in danger. Marlowe orders Benson and Stabler to catch the ring's leader in the act, while Cragen wants ESU to take the perp at his warehouse. Cragen remarks to Marlowe, "You're the boss in court counselor, not here." Marlowe leaves the precinct only to have Cragen follow her outside, where he reminds her of "why she really retired" back in 1995: when she was a lieutenant she had sent two undercover detectives who later died in an attempt to arrest a drive-by murderer. Marlowe responds it was a "Command decision." Cragen's detectives do arrest the ringleader, while Cragen saves the young woman in the warehouse. Marlowe is able to convict the leader by using his delivery doctor's testimony, which he delivered in the judge's chambers for protection.

In the season 11 finale, "Shattered", Marlowe is taken hostage, along with Detective Benson and Dr. Warner, in the morgue by Sophie Gerard (Isabelle Huppert), the distraught mother of a dead boy. Gerard shoots Dr. Warner and Benson and Marlowe must take action to save her life. In talking the mother down, Marlowe says she knows what it is like to be in pain as she reveals that she was diagnosed with an "aggressive" type of cancer and had a bilateral radical mastectomy a year before taking the job at SVU. Marlowe makes Gerard drop the gun by picking up the dead boy and saying that he needs his mother and handing him to her. ADA Gillian Hardwicke replaces Marlowe as SVU's permanent ADA at the beginning of season 12.

Entertainment Weekly reviewed Stone's performance as a "great presence", and having "had to revive her best ... tone to sell hokey lines" in a series it described as "mawkish and overwrought."

=== Sherri West ===
- Portrayed by Francie Swift
- Episodes: "Bullseye", "Behave", "Delinquent", "Smoked", and "Double Strands"

Sherri West is brought in as a temporary ADA to start season 12. West first appears in the second episode, where she is the prosecutor on a case where a pedophile is kidnapping and raping young girls. When the suspect is brutally beaten in the SVU holding cell by an officer, West assures the judge that violence against the defendant will not occur again. West next appeared in the third episode, "Behave", in which Benson works with to get justice for a rape victim named Vicki Sayers (Jennifer Love Hewitt), and to ensure that Bill Harris (James Le Gros), her rapist, is put away.

West returns in the 23rd episode, "Delinquent". When SVU detectives find a teenage boy named Hunter Mazelon (Sterling Beaumon) naked and asleep in a young woman's bed, West tells them that she can't charge him with a sex crime but he can be charged with burglary and criminal trespassing, among other charges. When Hunter says during his arraignment that Stabler molested him after handcuffing him, West's case is in jeopardized, since there was also no actual victim. West manages to get Mazelon to allocute, which he did falsely, but Stabler wished for West to call for a recess. Tutuola and Stabler comment about how they have been “burning through ADAs” and maybe West cut the deal to cover Stabler so that they would like her.

In the season 12 finale "Smoked", a rape victim is murdered days before her trial is set to start. West is called again and pushes Benson and Stabler to find the victim's murderer. Benson and Stabler, with West's help, discover the murder was orchestrated by the rapist, a friend, and a greedy ATF agent. West never gets the chance to convict anyone, however, the victim's daughter kills all three defendants in the SVU squad room, before Stabler is forced to shoot her dead.

In the fourth episode of season 13, "Double Strands", West appears back in the SVU precinct, but now as a defense attorney; it is revealed that the firm that hired her "offered her a better deal."

=== Gillian Hardwicke ===
- Portrayed by Melissa Sagemiller
- Episodes: "Branded" – "Bombshell"

Gillian "Gill" Hardwicke is SVU's primary ADA in season 12. She is a Brooklyn ADA who transfers to Manhattan SVU due to her great admiration for detectives Benson and Stabler. She replaces Mikka Von (Paula Patton), who had been fired after only one case with the SVU team. Hardwicke has a 92% conviction rate as she stated in her premiere episode, "Branded". She often gets into conflict over cases with Benson and Stabler; with Benson over a case where a woman was raped as a teenager and she began seeking revenge on her attackers, branding them with hot clothes hangers. She and Benson also clash when Vivian Arliss (Maria Bello)—who gave custody of her son Calvin (Charlie Tahan) to Benson—is a suspect in a string of burglaries. Hardwicke and Stabler get into conflict over a case where presumably, a boy named Nicky Roberts (Al Calderon), shot and killed his abusive stepfather; she is eventually forced to drop the case because both Nicky and his mother Sandra (Drea de Matteo) admit to killing him, creating reasonable doubt for both of them. In "Penetration", Hardwicke convicts a man who raped FBI Agent Dana Lewis (Marcia Gay Harden) while she was undercover, on orders from Brian Ackerman (J. C. MacKenzie), the leader of a white supremacist group who is angry at Lewis for killing his son Kyle in the season 7 episode "Raw".

In her final episode, "Bombshell", Hardwicke attempts to convict twins Cassandra (Rose McGowan) and Doug (Ryan Hurst)—who are also in a sexual relationship—for their involvement in a man's brutal stabbing along with fraud crimes in New York and Miami. They are released on bail due to lack of evidence, which leads to Doug's murder by Cassandra's former lover Jerry Bullard (Tom Irwin). Hardwicke is mentioned in the episode "Reparations" as Tutuola says she is at a convention in Miami, before ADA Casey Novak returns as their temporary prosecutor. West then assumes the temporary ADA role for the final two episodes in season 12.

Melissa Sagemiller had previously been on SVU in season 1 episode "Russian Love Poem", portraying a rape victim. Sagemiller said about her character's personality: "She's tough... she has a heart, she just gets what she wants." Sagemiller also added, "She sticks to the letter of the law, sometimes to a fault, but in the end I think she always does the right thing."

From season 7 through 12, the SVU ADAs work without a Bureau Chief supervising their work, and are watched more closely by the District Attorney. In season 13, Executive ADA Michael Cutter (Linus Roache) is transferred from homicide to take over Donnelly's former role as supervisor.

=== Sister Peg ===
- Portrayed by Charlayne Woodard
- Episodes: "Silence", "Chameleon", "Loss", "Criminal", "Identity", "Pure", "Underbelly", "Smoked"

Sister Peg is a Catholic nun who lived and worked in New York City. Most of her work involved helping and protecting prostitutes, and so she came into contact with SVU detectives Stabler and Benson. In the season 6 episode "Pure", she was kidnapped by the murderer that the SVU detectives were trying to capture after they came in contact in the SVU squad-room. She was beaten up by a pimp in the season 8 episode "Underbelly", after trying to help one of his girls. She was killed in the season 12 finale "Smoked" by the young girl who fired a gun in the SVU squad-room with the intention of killing the men in holding who murdered her mother.

=== Bayard Ellis ===
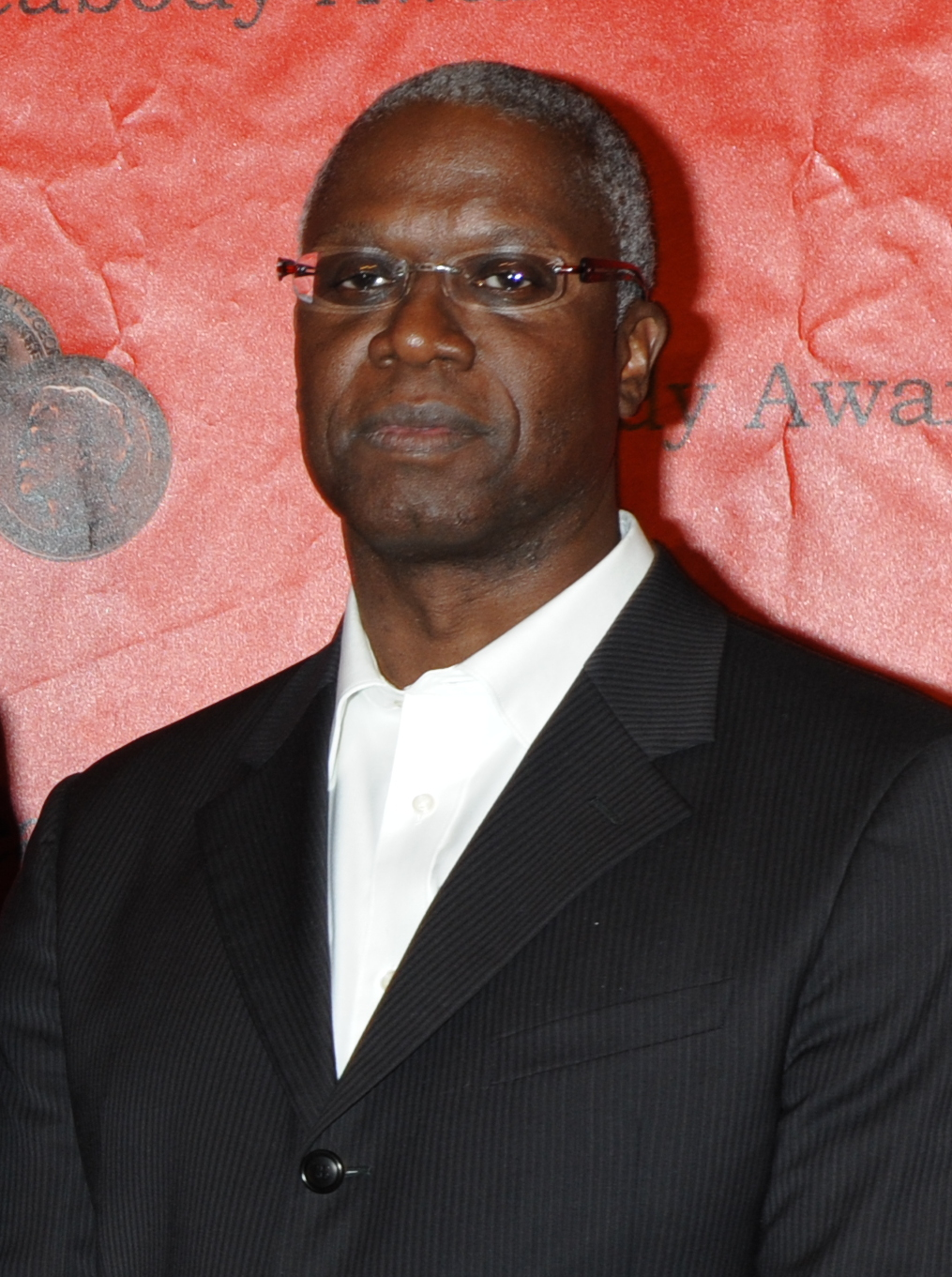
Bayard Ellis was portrayed by Andre Braugher in episodes "True Believers", "Spiraling Down", "Child's Welfare", "Justice Denied", "Monster's Legacy" & "Perverted Justice".

- Portrayed by Andre Braugher
- Episodes: "True Believers", "Spiraling Down", "Child's Welfare", "Justice Denied", "Monster's Legacy", "Perverted Justice"

Defense Attorney Bayard Ellis is introduced in season 13's "True Believers". He is said to be a high-powered defense attorney who has turned his attention to the underprivileged and minorities, which in turn makes him a civil rights champion. In "True Believers", he defends a black man who is on trial for attacking a girl in her apartment, and cites poor police procedure and the victim's creditably to get a not guilty verdict. At the close of this episode, he has a discussion with Detective Benson on the steps of the courthouse. After Benson blasts him for shaming the young girl on the stand, he tells her that she needs an escape and gives her his card, telling her to come by one of his daughter's softball games. In the episode "Spiraling Down", Benson gives Ellis' card to the defendant's wife, whose husband is a former football star who suffers from diminished capacity. He defends the former football star and receives a not guilty verdict. Benson also calls on Ellis when her half-brother is in need of legal help after his kids have been removed by the city. Benson and Ellis have become close, which creates conflict in the episode "Justice Denied", as Ellis defends a man who Benson coerced a confession out of eight years earlier. Executive ADA David Haden, the prosecutor who is re-investigating the case and Benson's love interest, is confronted by Ellis about their relationship and threatens to expose them if they didn't do the right thing. Benson asks Ellis to give her some time to find the real rapist, which she does, or she will tell the District Attorney about her relationship with EADA Haden. Ellis returns in the season 14 episode, "Monster's Legacy", when Detective Benson asks him to look into the case of Reggie Rhodes (Mike Tyson), who is scheduled to be executed after being convicted of murder in Ohio. Benson is able to get Rhodes to admit that he was abused when he was a child by the head of a camp in New York, which allows Ellis to argue that Rhodes' original defense attorney never presented that during the trial. Ellis uncovers a massive cover up by the lead prosecutor in the original case, who withheld photographic evidence of Rhodes being sexually assaulted by the man he murdered. Ellis subsequently convinces the judge to spare Rhodes from execution. Ellis is next seen in the season 16 episode, "Perverted Justice", when he comes to Benson and SVU asking them to reinvestigate a case he is working for Project Innocence. With the help of the now-retired Captain Cragen, Ellis is able to vacate the original charge against his client for raping his daughter decades earlier.

=== William Lewis ===
- Portrayed by Pablo Schreiber
- Episodes: "Her Negotiation" – "American Tragedy", "Psycho/Therapist", "Beast's Obsession", "Post-Mortem Blues"

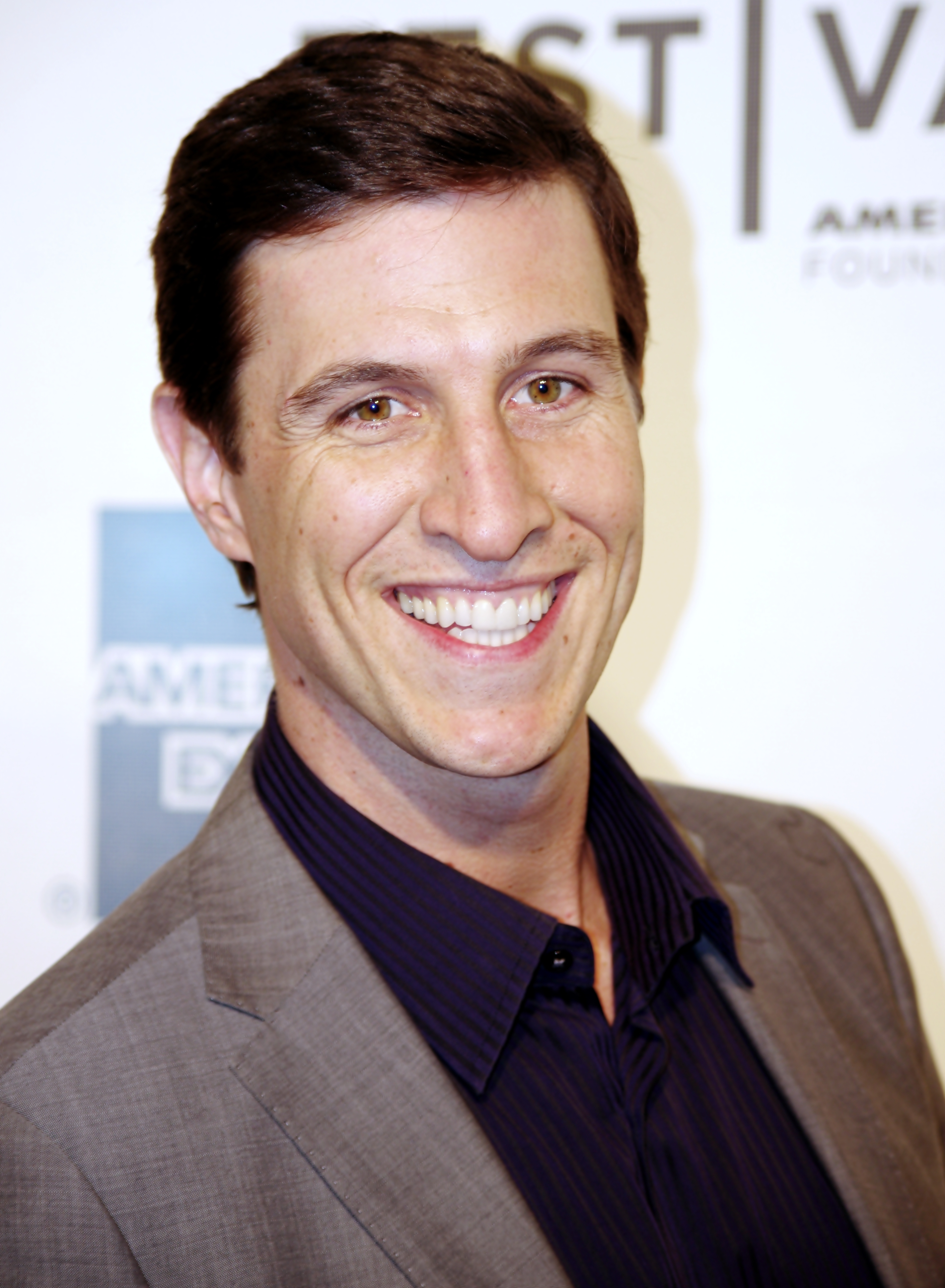
William Lewis was played by Pablo Schreiber in eight episodes of season 14.

William Lewis is a serial rapist and murderer who had gotten away with numerous counts of rape and murder because of mistakes in the system made by different police jurisdictions. In the season 14 finale, Benson and ADA Barba pursue justice for Lewis' victims and attempt to get him locked up for good; but again, Lewis walks on a technicality. He later breaks into Detective Benson's apartment and tortures her before later abducting her and bringing her to at an isolated location, killing a traffic cop and his own defense attorney's parents on the way. Benson breaks free of her restraints and beats him within an inch of his life. Lewis is shipped off to a hospital and is later charged and brought to trial (SVU: "Psycho/Therapist") for his assault and abduction of Benson. Lewis represents himself and maneuvers to force Benson to take the stand and tell everyone what he did to her and what she did to him; crippling him in one leg, damaging numerous internal organs, and even deafening him in one ear. Benson lies and denies that she had him restrained, that he had broken free and she had to harm him to subdue him; this drives Lewis into a rage during his cross testimony with her. Lewis is found not guilty on the rape charge but guilty on the kidnapping charge, as well as assault of a police officer. He goes away to prison but before the trial ends, he bribes a juror to use drugged baked goods for them to make him sick and have a way to make a jailbreak. Lewis then pursues Benson again, killing and raping people in his path and abducting a little girl, Amelia Cole (Lily Pilblad) to make Benson come to him at an abandoned quarry where he abducts her again. He is about to attempt to rape Benson again, but when Benson refuses to show him fear, he decides to force her to play a game of Russian roulette with him. It winds up where Olivia has to take the last bullet, thinking he is about to kill her; he stands beside her and quickly shoots himself in the head with his left hand, making it seem as if she shot him; this is his final revenge. The charges against Benson are later dropped, however. The last thing Lewis tells Benson is that his death will be the last thing she will see before she dies. At the Kings County morgue, Benson asks if she can take one last look at Lewis' dead body in order to achieve closure.

In subsequent seasons, Lewis' name becomes a kind of code for an intensely dangerous situation and Benson reveals that her trauma and ordeal with him will always be a part of her. During a heated exchange with Amaro, he pointedly asks her whether she can ever forgive Lewis; she does not answer and he apologizes.

=== Barry Moredock ===
- Portrayed by John Cullum
- Episodes: "Appearances" – "Possessed"

Barry Moredock, a judge, originally appeared as a defense attorney in the episode "Appearances", on a case in which a child pornography maker is put on trial for giving instructions on how to kill via a story on his company's website. He works on another case with Cabot in the episode "Manic", where a child kills two high school students and is given medication from his mother due to an illegal marketing campaign by the major pharmaceutical company Tauscher-Leto. In the seventh season, he works as a defense attorney on a case with Casey Novak as ADA in the episode "Raw", where he defends a Neo-Nazi group. In the season 9 episode "Blinded", Moredock and Novak work on a case together in which a violent, schizophrenic artist kidnaps and rapes two girls. Starting in the episode "Babes" to present, Moredock is a judge. His first case (seen) is the case of a homeless boy burned to death by a high school student. In the episode "Smut", he is blackmailed when SVU is notified about a video he was sent by an acquaintance showing a dolphin humping a woman on his personal file server, which could be classified as pornography. Moredock recuses himself from the case, in which a rapist claims he was driven by pornography to sexually assault women. He reunites with Cabot in the episode "Lead" as the judge presiding over the case of a developmentally disabled man who killed the pediatrician who molested him as a child. As the trial goes on, it is discovered that the defendant suffers from lead poisoning caused by Chinese-made products. In the 2009 episode "Hammered" Moredock presides over the case of a heavy drinker accused of killing a woman during an alcoholic blackout. When ADA Sonya Paxton shows up to court drunk, he orders her to get alcoholism treatment. In "Possessed", Moredock drops a statutory rape case because the statute of limitations had run out, even as he states that he finds the defendant, an elderly pedophile, repulsive.

=== Kathy Stabler ===
- Portrayed by Isabel Gillies
- Episodes: "Payback" – "Delinquent" – "Return of the Prodigal Son"

Kathy Stabler was Detective Elliot Stabler's wife: they got married when they were both 17. The two are separated for some time in seasons 6 through 8, but Kathy shows up in the squad room in the season 8 finale "Screwed" and tells him that she needs him to come home because she is pregnant. In the season 9 episode "Paternity", Kathy and Detective Benson are involved in a car accident while Benson was helping Elliot by bringing Kathy to the doctor for a check-up. Kathy is pinned and unconscious when Benson wakes up and calls for help. Benson is tasked with helping EMS stabilize her as they cannot get into the car. Kathy is extracted from the car by firefighters and placed in the ambulance, where she goes into labor and delivers a baby boy before she becomes unconscious again. Elliot, who had been upstate retrieving a perp, arrives at the hospital and embraces Kathy and his new son, Elliot Jr. Kathy and Elliot have five children together: Maureen, Kathleen Louise, twins Richard ("Dickie") and Elizabeth ("Lizzie"), and Elliot Jr. ("Eli"). Kathy returned to L&O:SVU after a 10-year hiatus along with her husband, Elliot. In "Return of the Prodigal Son," she is approaching a rental car she intends to drive when a bomb goes off and she is caught in the blast radius. She is taken to a hospital and, while there, goes into cardiac arrest, eventually dying from a ruptured spleen incurred from the bombing.

=== Ken Randall ===
- Portrayed by Ernest Waddell
- Episodes: "Haunted", "Strain", "Venom", "Outsider", "Screwed", "Conned", "Learning Curve", "Intersecting Lives", "Send In The Clowns", "Down Low in Hell's Kitchen", "Wolves In Sheep's Clothing"

Kwasi Tutuola, or, as he prefers, Ken Randall, is Detective Tutuola's son and is first mentioned in "Counterfeit", where Fin stated he loved old cop weapons. Fin stated that Ken is 18. He is introduced in the season 6 episode, "Haunted", in which Tutuola is shot after trying to prevent a robbery. Ken reveals to his father that he is openly gay in the season 7 episode, "Strain". In the season 7 episode, "Venom", Ken is arrested after he was found digging in a vacant lot while he was intoxicated. It is discovered that Ken was searching for the woman and baby that his half-brother, Darius, said he had killed. This puts heat on Tutuola within the squad, as he fights to exonerate his son and prove that Darius is a murderer. When Darius cons SVU into getting his confession without his lawyer present, the case continues in the season 8 finale, "Screwed". Ken returns to try to help his father and the rest of the detectives find evidence to convict Darius. While being questioned on the stand, Ken's mother is forced to reveal that Darius was a product of rape by her own father. This news left Ken stunned that Darius is also his uncle. Afterwards, he and his father mutually cut ties with Darius for his actions. During the season 13 episode, "Learning Curve", Ken asks for Sergeant Munch's help in revealing to his father that he is getting married. But before Ken is able to tell his father, his fiancé is brutally attacked. While at the hospital, Munch tells Tutuola that the man is Ken's fiancé, which makes Tutuola determined to find the attackers. Eventually, Alejandro recovers from his injuries and he and Ken marry. As of "Intersecting Lives", Ken and Alejandro are expecting a child, having found a surrogate; to Ken's surprise and relief, Fin is excited about becoming a grandfather.

During "Send in the Clowns ", Ken and Alejandro visit Fin at his job for his birthday. They are shown to have been successful in adopting a baby boy named Jaden, who Fin dotes on to his coworkers.

In "Down Low in Hell's Kitchen", Ken assists SVU in tracking down a serial rapist attacking gay men outside a bar.

=== Simon Marsden ===
- Portrayed by Michael Weston.
- Episodes: "Philadelphia", "Florida", "Screwed", "Child's Welfare", "Murdered at a Bad Address"

Simon Marsden is Detective Benson's half-brother whom she discovers through a DNA kinship analysis. He caused extensive trouble throughout season 8 for Olivia and the entire squad after Olivia seeks him out at his New Jersey home. She discovers he is being investigated by police for stalking, but in the season 8 episode "Florida", it is revealed he is being set up by the police captain after Simon holds her hostage. Because of Benson's involvement with a "fugitive", she is suspended for some time, which is made known in the season 9 premiere "Alternate". Simon makes his return in season 13, when he pleads with Detective Benson to help him after his children are removed by the city (Benson is visibly shaken when Simon says that their father was a better parent to him, than he was to his own kids). Benson enlists attorney Bayard Ellis to act as Simon's lawyer, but she is shocked when Captain Cragen alerts her that Simon has kidnapped the children from foster care. Simon reappears once again in Season 21, where he attempts to patch things up with Benson and meet her adoptive son Noah. She invites him to lunch with Noah, but is enraged when he does not show up and leaves him an enraged voice mail. Benson later learns he had died of a drug overdose.

=== Maria Grazie Amaro ===
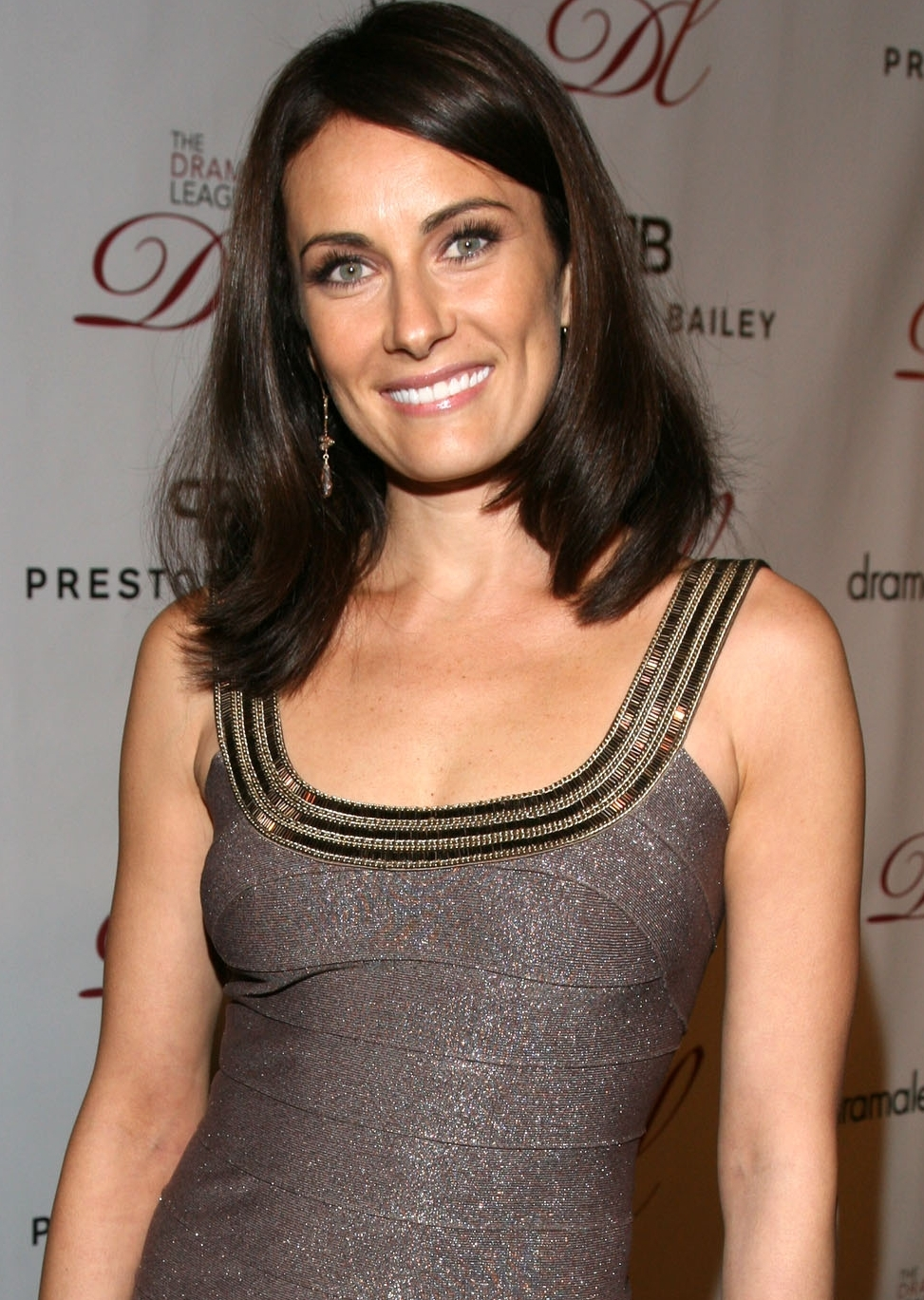
Maria Grazie Amaro has been portrayed by Laura Benanti in ten episodes since season 13.

- Portrayed by Laura Benanti
- Episodes: "Spiraling Down" – "Above Suspicion", "Military Justice", "Thought Criminal"

Detective Amaro's wife, Maria, is introduced in the season 13 episode "Spiraling Down". She is serving in the armed forces and stationed in Iraq. In "Spiraling Down", Amaro video chats with her about the father of a victim in one of his cases, who served overseas with her. They have somewhat of a tense conversation, as she does not like the tone he is using with her, after he asked why he has never heard of this man. After returning to New York City in the episode "Official Story", she heads back overseas on a new assignment. In the episode "Valentine's Day", she is once again back in New York and shows up in the squad room after Amaro was late for their Valentine's Day dinner. At the end of this episode, Amaro watches his wife enter an unknown brownstone, and he has the increased suspicion that she is having an affair. In the following episode, "Street Revenge", Amaro sees her meet for lunch with the same military friend who appeared in "Spiraling Down". Amaro drives to Philadelphia, where her friend lives, punches him, and tells him to stay away from his wife. Maria discovers this and comes into the squad room in a rage, knocking folders off his desk. They begin to argue in front of the squad, until Cragen tells Amaro, "not here", and they go into the bunk room. Amaro reveals his suspicion and she says that she is not having an affair and that the brownstone he saw her enter was her psychiatrist, before she storms out of the room. In the season 14 premiere, after Amaro delays talking to her about their issues, he finally begins to apologize when she tells him that she has taken a job in Washington D.C. and she is taking their daughter with her.

=== Other minor characters ===
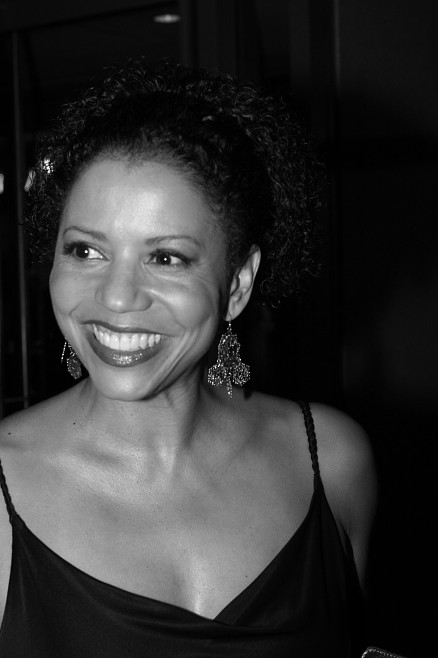
Christine Danielson was portrayed by Gloria Reuben in episodes "Snitch", "Merchandise" & "Dirty".

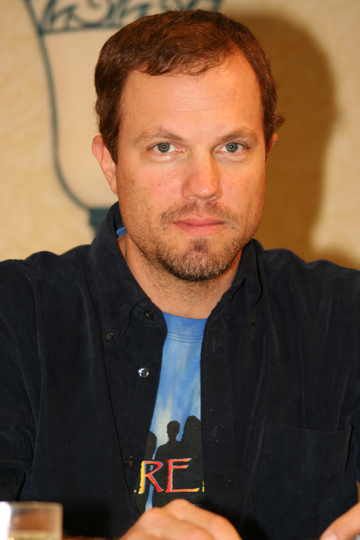
Steven Harris was portrayed by Adam Baldwin in episodes "Lost Reputation", "Above Suspicion" & "Twenty-Five Acts".

- Abbie Carmichael, portrayed by Angie Harmon (episodes: "Payback" – "Entitled" In season 1, ADA Abbie Carmichael, from Law & Order, prosecuted SVU cases for six episodes.
- Detective Kenneth "Ken" Briscoe, portrayed by Chris Orbach (season 1) is the nephew of 27th Homicide Precinct detective, Lennie Briscoe (Jerry Orbach, Chris is his son). is a detective assigned to Manhattan's Special Victims Unit under the command of Captain Donald Cragen. His partner is Detective Monique Jeffries, and works closely with Detectives Benson, Stabler, Munch, and Cassidy. He was in the episode "Entitled" with his uncle, Lennie. It's been unknown what happened to Ken Briscoe as his last on-screen episode was "Contact". The character was set to return after more than twelve years in the season 14 episode "Manhattan Vigil" in flashback scenes. However, during final editing of the episode, Dick Wolf reported the character's scenes had been removed.
- Stan Villani, portrayed by Ron Leibman (episodes: "Repression" – "Ridicule" is an Executive Assistant District Attorney. He is briefly assigned to oversee SVU cases and to sit co-chair with A.D.A. Alexandra Cabot by District Attorney Nora Lewin.
- Bureau Chief Muldrew, portrayed by John Schuck (episodes: "Outcry", "Haunted", "Storm", "Screwed", "Signature", "Inconceivable", "Anchor", "Shadow") is the NYPD Chief of Detectives who served as Captain Cragen's commanding officer.
- Christine Danielson, portrayed by Gloria Reuben (episodes: "Snitch", "Merchandise" & "Dirty") is the Homicide Bureau Chief ADA (a role Cabot had a year prior, in Conviction) prosecuting a case in which a Nigerian polygamist's wife is killed, and the husband fears that his testifying in a crime may have led to his wife's demise. Danielson returns in the twelfth season, this time as an Assistant U.S. Attorney for the Eastern District of New York. To assist in the first conviction of a child trafficking case in the New York area, she deputizes Benson and Stabler as U.S. marshals. Danielson returns again in the season, to help Benson investigate the murder of a corrupt Brooklyn ADA.
- Captain Steven Harris, portrayed by Adam Baldwin (episodes: "Lost Reputation", "Above Suspicion", "Twenty-Five Acts") is the Special Victims Unit interim captain who is installed by the Public Integrity Bureau Chief ADA Paula Foster for the first three episodes of the 14th season while Cragen is suspended. A by-the-book commanding officer, Harris warns the SVU detectives not to investigate Cragen's murder case, which they ignore, and criticizes the way Detective Tutuola dresses, citing the business attire dress code. When Detective Cassidy is shot while undercover in a hit arranged by his own boss, Harris backs Olivia during the Internal Affairs investigation. In "Twenty-Five Acts", Harris gives a nod to Amaro's request to work a case solo, pairing Benson with Rollins. He departs at the end of the episode, as Captain Cragen returns from suspension.
- NYPD Lab Tech Colin Bennett, portrayed by Max Baker (episodes: "Justice Denied," "Brief Interlude," "Criminal Pathology," "Know It All") is an NYPD Crime Lab technician known as Fin's "rope guy," Bennett specifically specializes in types of rope found at crime scenes. He is first introduced in "Justice Denied" where a rapist strikes during Fleet Week and uses an M.O. specific to a perpetrator that Benson had arrested in 2004. Bennett helped analyze the knots that were tied in the differing crime scenes. In the season eighteen episode "Know It All", Bennett and ADA Barba are blackmailed by a rapist to make his case and the evidence disappear. Bennett makes an attempt to lead the SVU detectives astray with his "findings" during the investigation until Detectives Tutuola and Rollins discover the truth, as Bennett attempts suicide due to the guilt of tampering with the case.
- Kim Rollins, portrayed by Lindsay Pulsipher (episodes: "Friending Emily", "Deadly Ambition", "Maternal Instincts", "Heightened Emotions", "Eternal Relief From Pain") is Detective Amanda Rollins' sister, who comes to New York in the season 14 episode, "Friending Emily". She frequently interrupts Amanda while she is working an abduction case, and at the end of the episode, Amanda draws her gun on Kim's ex-boyfriend, who is in her apartment with Kim, telling him to get out. Later in the episode "Deadly Ambition", Kim returns to New York, beaten and pregnant with her ex-boyfriend's baby. When Amanda hears screams from inside her apartment, she finds Kim's ex-boyfriend attacking Kim, and Amanda shoots the man as he pulls a gun on her. After her initial interview with IAB Lt. Tucker, Kim changes her story to further implicate Amanda, including revealing a life insurance policy on the ex-boyfriend with Amanda's name on it. Kim says she did it to make it look like an accident, but it leads to Amanda's arrest. When Detective Amaro records Kim admitting to him that she set Amanda up, IAB drops the charges against Amanda and pursues Kim for the murder, only to find she has skipped town. Kim returns in season 17, as a suspect in an assault and robbery of a musician. Her criminal involvement coincides with their mother being in New York to throw Amanda a baby shower. Their mother sides with Kim, as they blame Amanda for her getting arrested and charged.
- Detective Frank Bucci, portrayed by Nicholas Turturro (episodes: "Part 33", "Can't Be Held Accountable", "Must Be Held Accountable"), is a detective who has crossed paths with the SVU in many of their investigations. He is also the father of two girls, Ivy and Milly. He first appears in "Part 33" testifying during the trial of Annabeth Pearl. He reappears in "Can't Be Held Accountable" asking the Special Victims Unit for help when Steve Getz grooms his daughters. Bucci is shocked and horrified when his daughters defend Getz, and he is later assaulted by two men hired by Getz to deliver Bucci a warning. When Getz is let go by Judge Joe Ellery, Detective Bucci snaps and barges into Amanda Rollins's therapy session, taking both her and her therapist Dr. Alexis Hanover hostage, demanding Getz be charged.

== Crossover characters within the Law & Order universe ==
| Name | Portrayed by | Year | # Eps | Original series |
|---|---|---|---|---|
| Captain Donald Cragen | Dann Florek | 1999–2025 | 333 | Law & Order |
| Detective/Sergeant John Munch | Richard Belzer | 1999–2016 | 324 | Homicide: Life on the Street |
| Medical Examiner Elizabeth Rodgers | Leslie Hendrix | 1999–2000 | 9 | Law & Order |
| Detective Lennie Briscoe | Jerry Orbach | 1999–2000 | 3 | Law & Order |
| Detective Ed Green | Jesse L. Martin | 1999–2000 | 2 | Law & Order |
| Dr. Elizabeth Olivet | Carolyn McCormick | 1999–2001, 2013–2018 | 6 | Law & Order |
| ADA Abbie Carmichael | Angie Harmon | 1999–2000 | 6 | Law & Order |
| District Attorney Adam Schiff | Steven Hill | 2000 | 1 | Law & Order |
| Judge Barry Abrams | Patrick Tovatt | 2000 | 1 | Law & Order |
| Judge Walter Schreiber | John Ramsay | 2000 | 1 | Law & Order |
| Judge Margaret Barry | Doris Belack | 2000–2001 | 2 | Law & Order |
| Dr. Emil Skoda | J. K. Simmons | 2000–2001 | 6 | Law & Order |
| District Attorney Nora Lewin | Dianne Wiest | 2000–2002 | 2 | Law & Order |
| Executive ADA / District Attorney Jack McCoy | Sam Waterston | 2000–2010, 2018 | 4 | Law & Order |
| District Attorney Arthur Branch | Fred Dalton Thompson | 2003–2006 | 11 | Law & Order |
| Defense Attorney Dave Seaver | Michael Boatman | 2003–2011 | 7 | Law & Order |
| Judge Walter Bradley | Peter McRobbie | 2003–2012 | 18 | Law & Order |
| Judge Rebecca Steinman | Susan Blommaert | 2004 | 1 | Law & Order |
| Bureau Chief ADA Tracey Kibre | Bebe Neuwirth | 2005 | 1 | Law & Order: Trial by Jury |
| District Attorney Investigator Hector Salazar | Kirk Acevedo | 2005 | 1 | Law & Order: Trial by Jury |
| Gwen Munch | Carol Kane | 2009, 2013 | 2 | Homicide: Life on the Street |
| Detective Rex Winters | Skeet Ulrich | 2010 | 1 | Law & Order: LA |
| DDA Jonah Dekker | Terrence Howard | 2011 | 1 | Law & Order: LA |
| Bureau Chief ADA Michael Cutter | Linus Roache | 2011–2012 | 4 | Law & Order |
| Lieutenant Alexandra Eames | Kathryn Erbe | 2012–2013 | 2 | Law & Order: Criminal Intent |
| Detective Louise Campesi | Caris Vujcec | 2012–2022 | 7 | Law & Order: Criminal Intent |
| Father Shea | Denis O'Hare | 2013 | 1 | Law & Order: Criminal Intent |
| Detective Meldrick Lewis | Clark Johnson | 2013 | 1 | Homicide: Life on the Street |
| Billie Lou Hatfield | Ellen McElduff | 2013 | 1 | Homicide: Life on the Street |
| Assistant US Attorney Connie Rubirosa | Alana de la Garza | 2014 | 1 | Law & Order; Law & Order: LA |
| Detective Erin Lindsay | Sophia Bush | 2014–2016 | 4 | Chicago P.D. |
| Sergeant Hank Voight | Jason Beghe | 2014–2016 | 3 | Chicago P.D. |
| Detective Jay Halstead | Jesse Lee Soffer | 2014–2015 | 2 | Chicago P.D. |
| Officer Kim Burgess | Marina Squerciati | 2015 | 1 | Chicago P.D. |
| Officer Sean Roman | Brian Geraghty | 2015 | 1 | Chicago P.D. |
| Nadia Decotis | Stella Maeve | 2015 | 1 | Chicago P.D. |
| Detective Antonio Dawson | Jon Seda | 2016 | 1 | Chicago P.D. |
| Randolph J. "Randy" Dworkin, Esq. | Peter Jacobson | 2017–2018 | 2 | Law & Order |
| Lieutenant Carolyn Barek | Annabella Sciorra | 2021 | 1 | Law & Order: Criminal Intent |
| Sergeant Ayanna Bell | Danielle Moné Truitt | 2021–2023 | 5 | Law & Order: Organized Crime |
| Detective Jet Slootmaekers | Ainsley Seiger | 2021–2023 | 3 | Law & Order: Organized Crime |
| Richard Wheatley | Dylan McDermott | 2021 | 1 | Law & Order: Organized Crime |
| Angela Wheatley | Tamara Taylor | 2021 | 1 | Law & Order: Organized Crime |
| Richard Wheatley, Jr. | Nick Creegan | 2021 | 1 | Law & Order: Organized Crime |
| El Gato | Claro Austria | 2021 | 1 | Law & Order: Organized Crime |
| Detective Frank Cosgrove | Jeffrey Donovan | 2022 | 1 | Law & Order |
| Detective Jalen Shaw | Mehcad Brooks | 2022 | 1 | Law & Order |
| Detective Violet Yee | Connie Shi | 2022 | 1 | Law & Order |
| Lieutenant Kate Dixon | Camryn Manheim | 2022–2023 | 2 | Law & Order |
| Detective Jamie Whelan | Brent Antonello | 2023 | 1 | Law & Order: Organized Crime |
| Detective Bobby Reyes | Rick Gonzalez | 2023 | 1 | Law & Order: Organized Crime |
| Defense Attorney Harry Kagan | Zak Orth | 2024 | 1 | Law & Order |
| District Attorney Nicholas Baxter | Tony Goldwyn | 2025–2026 | 6 | Law & Order |
| Executive Assistant District Attorney Nolan Price | Hugh Dancy | 2025–2026 | 3 | Law & Order |
| Lieutenant Jessica Brady | Maura Tierney | 2025–2026 | 2 | Law & Order |
| Miguel Pinto | J. Anthony Pena | 2025 | 1 | Law & Order |
| Father Alberto | Al Vincente | 2025 | 1 | Law & Order |
| Gloria Ortega | Edlyn González | 2025 | 1 | Law & Order |
| Lieutenant Paul Gomez | Reinaldo Faberlle | 2025 | 1 | Law & Order |
| Detective Vincent Riley | Reid Scott | 2026 | 1 | Law & Order |
| Detective Theo Walker | David Ajala | 2026 | 1 | Law & Order |
