= Above Suspicion (Law & Order: Special Victims Unit) =

- Law & Order: Special Victims Unit episode
- Detective Benson (Mariska Hargitay) telling Bureau Chief ADA Paula Foster (Paget Brewster) that the captain is being set up.
- Episode no.: Season 14; Episode 2
- Directed by: Michael Slovis
- Written by: Warren Leight; Julie Martin
- Production code: 11a11
- Original air date: September 26, 2012

Guest appearances
- Paget Brewster as Bureau Chief ADA Paula Foster; Adam Baldwin as Captain Steven Harris; Peter Jacobson as Bart Ganzel; Brooke Smith as Delia Wilson; Sue Simmons as herself; Jason Cerbone as Defense Attorney Lorenzo Desappio; Amy Hargreaves as Iris Peterson; Michael Potts as Internal Affairs Bureau Detective; Courtney Reed as Officer Alana Gonzalez; Marc John Jefferies as Hasdrubal; Reg E. Cathey as Defense Attorney Barry Querns; Ron Rifkin as Defense Attorney Marvin Exley; Dean Winters as Detective Brian Cassidy

Episode chronology
← Previous "Lost Reputation"	Next → "Twenty-Five Acts"
- Law & Order: Special Victims Unit season 14

"Above Suspicion" is the second episode of the fourteenth season of the police procedural television series Law & Order: Special Victims Unit and the 297th overall episode. It originally aired on NBC in the United States on September 26, 2012, after the episode "Lost Reputation". In the episode, continuing after the previous one, the case against Captain Cragen (Dann Florek) sets in motion after he is arrested for the murder of escort Carissa Gibson (Pippa Black); meanwhile, Detective Olivia Benson (Mariska Hargitay) has to keep her partner calm, deal with Detective Brian Cassidy's (Dean Winters) shooting, and prove to ADA Foster (Paget Brewster) that Cragen was being set up.

The episode was written by showrunner/executive producer Warren Leight and Julie Martin and was directed by Michael Slovis. The episode is the third part of the storyline from "Rhodium Nights" and "Lost Reputation".

"Above Suspicion" earned generally positive reviews, critics praising the continuation of the storyline, with Paget Brewster's and Adam Baldwin's guest appearances, as well as praising stars Mariska Hargitay and Danny Pino. According to the Nielsen ratings, the episode's original broadcast with "Lost Reputation" preceding was watched by an average of 7.19 million total viewers and received a 2.1/6% share in the 18–49 age demographic, up slightly from the season thirteen finale.

== Plot ==
The murder case against Captain Cragen (Dann Florek) sets in motion as more evidence accumulates suggesting Cragen had killed Carissa Gibson (Pippa Black). Delia Wilson (Brooke Smith) and her attorney meet with Detective Benson (Mariska Hargitay) and Bureau Chief ADA Paula Foster (Paget Brewster) and blames Cragen for Carissa's death, saying Cragen saw more of her girls. Disbelieving that claim, Benson goes to see Cragen at Riker's, where he admits to using the escort service after realizing how lonely he was during his undercover operation last year.

Meanwhile, Detective Cassidy (Dean Winters) continues his work deep undercover in Bart Ganzel's (Peter Jacobson) prostitution ring. After discovering a bug in his home, Ganzel wonders whether Cassidy, the police, or Delia planted it. When leaving Ganzel's apartment, Cassidy confronts an armed carjacker and is shot by local police.

Benson is frustrated by her new captain, Harris (Adam Baldwin) and Internal Affairs, trying to investigate a good undercover cop versus two rookies. They find that the carjacking and police shooting was arranged from Ganzel's burner phone. Cassidy survives in the hospital and testifies to what he has seen, and Ganzel is arrested while trying to flee the country. Benson and ADA Foster turn Ganzel's attorney (Reg E. Cathey) against him by playing taped recordings of Ganzel criticizing him and using racist slurs behind his back.

Benson learns that Ganzel isn't the only one involved in the setup on Cragen; After learning that Foster had been protecting Delia, Benson investigated her finances and found she was on Delia's payroll, having started taking bribes to pay for treatment for her sick daughter. Benson has Foster and everyone taking bribes arrested, including congressmen and prosecutors. Cragen is released from jail, the charges dropped, but he says that his reputation is still damaged, and that he won't be back at SVU yet due to the lengthy reinstatement process.

== Production ==
"Above Suspicion" was written by executive producer/showrunner Warren Leight (with Julie Martin), who is promoted to executive producer, replacing Ted Kotcheff, as of this episode. The episode was directed by Michael Slovis. Ed Zuckerman, who was co-executive producer on the original Law & Order, replaces David Matthews. Ice-T announced on Twitter that filming on the fourteenth season began on Monday, July 23, 2012. Leight said of the two episode premiere, "Where we got lucky was, quite by chance, NBC called and said they wanted two episodes for our first night back. They didn’t necessarily mean a two-parter, they just meant two separate episodes. Now we more or less had permission do a three-episode story, which is unheard of in the "Law & Order" world. So basically by the end of the day, we’ve essentially made a movie, a three-act movie."

Including the guest stars from the season thirteen finale, "Rhodium Nights", Paget Brewster was first cast in the season premiere openers as Bureau Chief ADA Paula Foster, who is the prosecutor on the murder case against Cragen. Brewster hires the SVU squad's interim captain, Steven Harris, portrayed by Adam Baldwin. Sue Simmons plays herself in this episode. Leight said, "It’s a big scandal within the world we’ve created, there’s a dead hooker in the captain’s bed, and we go to a newscaster to help us understand the story," said showrunner/executive producer Warren Leight, "Sue opens the episode doing a news standup from outside 1 Police Plaza. We’ll bring her back for the second episode of the two-parter."

== Reception ==
=== Critical response ===
Dani Bradford of TV Equals managed to see the premiere episode prior to the episode's original airing and left a mixed advance review, saying the premiere was "underwhelming". He criticized the storyline involving Cragen: "I have to admit that I was not a big fan of this premiere. [...] I thought that the plot was too focused on conspiracies and less upon what draws me to the show." He also criticized Detective Amaro's (Danny Pino) involvement in this episode. "Another thing that bothered me was Nick. Forever an Elliot Stabler fan, I guess I am still getting used to his "replacement." These episodes made me long for Elliot even more. Nick seemed too rogue and brooding. He did not interact with anyone and for most of the episodes, I focused my suspicion on him. That is not good when it involves one of the main detectives." Bradford added that; "Law & Order: SVU has long been one of my favorite shows and I am not giving up on it just yet."

On Huffington Post, novelist and former sex crimes prosecutor Allison Leotta said that "SVU opened its season with a roller-coaster of a double episode." Leotta gave the episode an "A−", saying "Perhaps the least plausible part of the story, however, was that Cragen hired those prostitutes just for their conversation and companionship. Still, it was a strong episode, well-written, compelling and grounded in authentic details. I'm looking forward to seeing what the rest of the season brings!"

=== Ratings ===
In its original American broadcast on September 26, 2012, both "Lost Reputation" and "Above Suspicion" aired as a two-hour season premiere on NBC, viewed by 7.19 million viewers and acquired a 2.1 rating/6% share in the age 18–49 demographic. "Lost Reputation" and "Above Suspicion" were the most watched programs on NBC that night, beating new episodes of its lead-ins Guys With Kids, and Animal Practice. "Above Suspicion" was the second ranked program in the timeslot under the season premiere of CSI on CBS and a recap episode of Revenge on ABC.
