= Lost Reputation =

- Law & Order: Special Victims Unit episode
- Detective Nick Amaro (Danny Pino) drawing his weapon on Cassidy (Dean Winters) in a bathroom at the end of the episode.
- Episode no.: Season 14; Episode 1
- Directed by: Michael Slovis
- Written by: Warren Leight; Julie Martin
- Production code: 14001
- Original air date: September 26, 2012

Guest appearances
- Paget Brewster as Bureau Chief ADA Paula Foster; Adam Baldwin as Captain Steven Harris; Peter Jacobson as Bart Ganzel; Brooke Smith as Delia Wilson; Pippa Black as Carissa Gibson; Jason Cerbone as Defense Attorney Lorenzo Desappio; Amy Hargreaves as Iris Peterson; Alison Fernandez as Zara Amaro; Sue Simmons as herself; Reg E. Cathey as Defense Attorney Barry Cuerns; Ron Rifkin as Defense Attorney Marvin Exley; Mary Ann Hay as Joannie Cassidy; Laura Benanti as Maria Amaro; Tamara Tunie as Medical Examiner Melinda Warner; Dean Winters as Detective Brian Cassidy

Episode chronology
← Previous "Rhodium Nights"	Next → "Above Suspicion"
- Law & Order: Special Victims Unit season 14

"Lost Reputation" is the fourteenth season premiere of the police procedural television series Law & Order: Special Victims Unit and the 296th overall episode. It originally aired on NBC on September 26, 2012. In the episode, the Special Victims Unit detectives try to stop a growing scandal when Captain Cragen (Dann Florek) is arrested for the murder of an escort, Carissa Gibson (Pippa Black). Meanwhile, Detective Nick Amaro (Danny Pino) has to juggle trying to solve the case against Cragen without losing his family in the process.

The episode was written by showrunner/executive producer Warren Leight and Julie Martin and was directed by Michael Slovis. The episode picks up where the thirteenth season ended with "Rhodium Nights", Cragen waking up next to a dead escort and the fallout from that, majority of the guest stars from "Rhodium Nights" appearing in "Lost Reputation".

"Lost Reputation" earned generally positive reviews, critics praising the continuation of the storyline, with Paget Brewster's and Adam Baldwin's guest appearances, as well as praising stars Mariska Hargitay and Danny Pino. According to the Nielsen ratings, the episode's original broadcast with "Above Suspicion" following was watched by an average of 7.19 million total viewers and received a 2.1/6% share in the 18–49 age demographic, up slightly from the season thirteen finale.

== Plot ==
The Special Victims Unit is reeling from the fallout after Captain Cragen (Dann Florek) wakes up with a dead escort - a potential witness in an SVU case - in his bed. Tensions run high at the precinct as the detectives contend with Bureau Chief ADA Paula Foster's (Paget Brewster) investigation of Cragen, who is eventually picked up and hauled to jail, Detective Benson (Mariska Hargitay) determined to get down to the truth and prove Cragen's innocence. The unit also has to deal with the arrival of a tough new captain, Steven Harris (Adam Baldwin), who is trying to shape the unit up, telling Tutuola (Ice-T) he is violating the NYPD dress code requirements. Harris also warns the detectives not to investigate Cragen's case, assigning Tutuola, Munch (Richard Belzer), and Rollins (Kelli Giddish) a case involving a celebrity flashing his genitals at a hotel.

Detective Nick Amaro (Danny Pino) is determined to solve the case against Cragen as well, his wife Maria (Laura Benanti) leaving him for a job in Washington D.C., taking their daughter with her. Amaro takes his focus off of his family and puts it on Brian Cassidy (Dean Winters), who treads an increasingly narrow line as an undercover cop in Bart Ganzel's (Peter Jacobson) escort organization, Amaro decides to take a different approach in getting answers out of Cassidy, Munch and Benson assuring Amaro that Cassidy is on the level. Meanwhile, the evidence against Cragen mounts as Detective Benson tries to get BC ADA Foster to see that the captain is being set up.

== Production ==
=== Filming and script ===
"Lost Reputation" was written by executive producer/showrunner Warren Leight with Julie Martin, who is promoted to executive producer, replacing Ted Kotcheff, as of this episode. The episode was also directed by Michael Slovis. Ed Zuckerman, who was co-executive producer on the original Law & Order, replaces David Matthews. Ice-T announced on Twitter that filming on the fourteenth season began on Monday, July 23, 2012.

In May 2012, showrunner/executive producer Warren Leight said that the story line for season fourteen will pick up where the thirteenth-season finale left off at, discussions of a two-part episode up at the time, "In fact, there were a number of scenes we shot that didn't make it into this cut that may make it into the next one. ... It's good to know who did it and why, and who's pulling the strings." On July 30, 2012, Leight confirmed the season premiere would be a two-part episode and Leight told Today, after talking about the returning guest stars from "Rhodium Nights", "We may want to do more of that this season," he said. The issue, he pointed out, is "how do you distinguish the 294th episode of 'SVU' from the others? I wanted to give people a reason to come back to season 14. The show deserves a good cliffhanger, and I loved reading people's responses after the finale ended -- 'Did they just do that?'" Leight continued, "People have us in a box," he said, "and I want them to see that the show is a little more adventurous than they might have remembered."

In an interview with Xfinity, showrunner/EP Warren Leight said, "We’re going to do something different for "Law & Order." We’re going to follow up. So the season ended with an escort dead in Cragen’s bed, and it seems like he has no idea how she got there. Where we got lucky was, quite by chance, NBC called and said they wanted two episodes for our first night back. They didn’t necessarily mean a two-parter, they just meant two separate episodes. Now we more or less had permission do a three-episode story, which is unheard of in the "Law & Order" world. So basically by the end of the day, we’ve essentially made a movie, a three-act movie." Leight told TV Guide that it took 24 days to film all the episodes ("Rhodium Nights" included), Leight said "There are high stakes. Not only is there a dead escort in Cragen's bed, but obviously there's a lot of tension between Amaro and Benson. We kept a lot of plates spinning and it was just a thrill to get to work in a longer form, For Dann Florek I don't think it was too much fun. I think he prefers a tailored suit to an orange jumpsuit."

Leight said that Detective Amaro (Danny Pino) would be looked at as well, since he was the last person to see Carrisa Gibson (Black) alive, Leight adding Amaro is still dealing with fixing his marriage, "We're trying to show the cumulative toll this sort of work takes on our heroes. We know his marriage is on very shaky ground. It was working while his wife was overseas and since she's come back it's just been a disaster. Their big question is: Can they work through it or is it over?"

On September 24, 2012, Mariska Hargitay sat down with KUSA, "I had the good fortune of seeing the season opener," Hargitay said. "And hands down, it was the best one I've seen in 14 years, and I've seen a few. It was so riveting and so good, and I think, 'How does the show get better and better and better?'" Hargitay said the show is now written more thematically than in early seasons. "Before, each [episode] was an individual show," she said. "You could just pick up anytime and it was a little island, and now they're all connected, and so the year has an arc to it. That's been really, really fun to play."

NBC did not release a promo/trailer for the season premiere episode(s) until Friday, September 7, 2012, online; the promo aired on television the next night.

=== Guest star casting ===
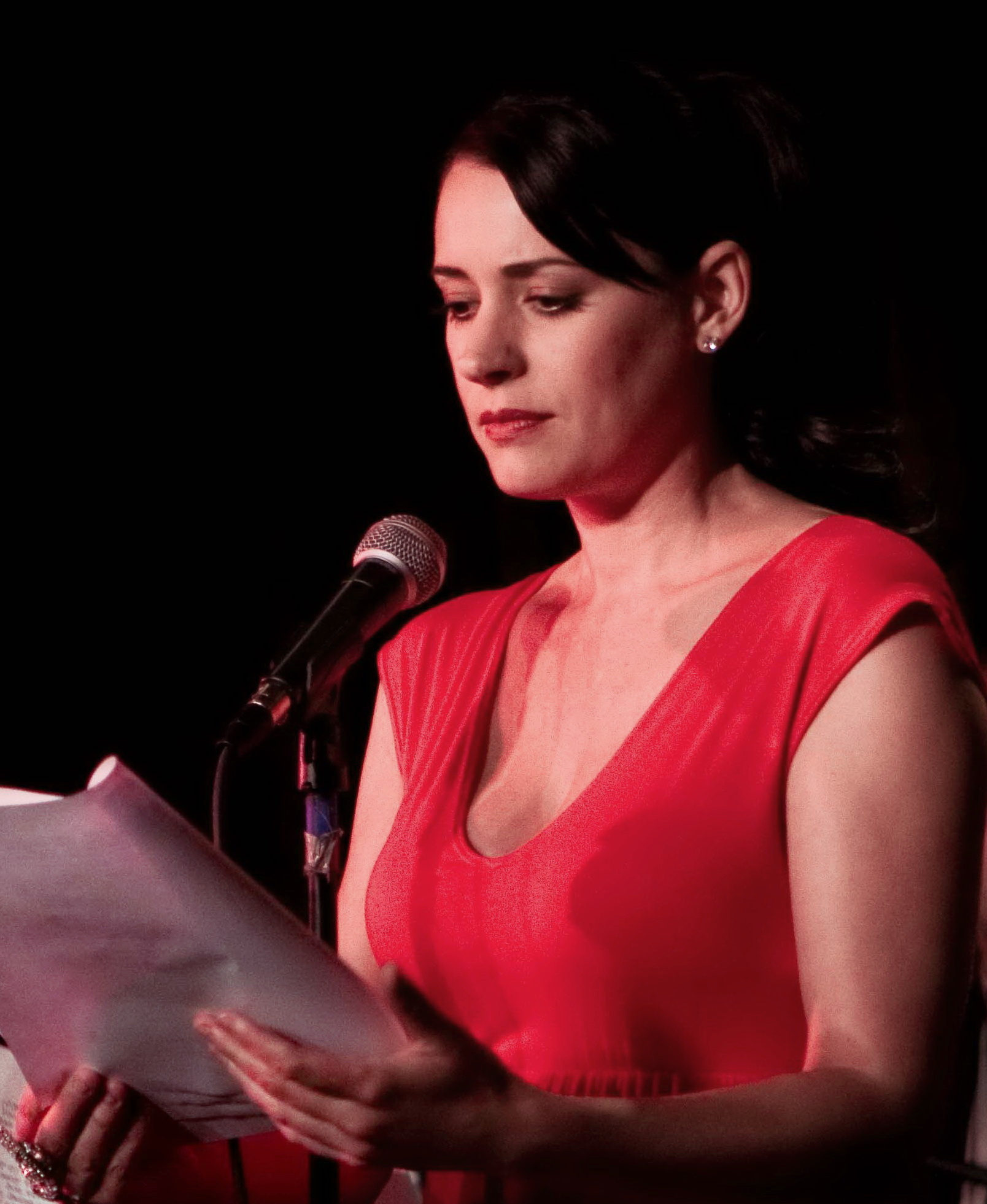
Paget Brewster (pictured) portrays Bureau Chief Assistant District Attorney Paula Foster. Brewster has been in SVU before, in season eight's "Scheherazade", as a terminally ill killer's daughter.

Including the guest stars from "Rhodium Nights", Paget Brewster was announced as the first guest star of the fourteenth season, portraying Bureau Chief ADA Paula Foster, of the Public Integrity Unit in the District Attorney's office. Her character is being assigned to the case against Captain Cragen (Dann Florek), who is suspected of murder after Cragen woke up with a dead prostitute (Pippa Black) in his bed. Brewster has guest starred on SVU before, in the eighth season episode, "Scheherazade", as the daughter of an elderly dying man, (Brian Dennehy) believed to be a murderer.

Brewster said after getting the role, "I was so crazy flattered when they offered me this part, and I didn't find out until after I took the role that the special two episode premiere of SVU [airing from 9/8c to 11/10c] was going to bump against Criminal Minds, which it never does!" Brewster said of moving on from Criminal Minds, "[...] last year I decided that I wanted to challenge myself, and doing these episodes of Law & Order: SVU has proven me right." Brewster noted of her character, BC ADA Foster, "I'm despised by the detectives," she says with a laugh, adding "I've been able to work with everybody, but especially with Mariska Hargitay!" Brewster added that she would be praying to the "Nielsen gods" on Sept. 26. "I'm so torn because I'm such a fan of both shows," she says. "I just hope both shows get great ratings!"

On September 25, 2012, Brewster told TV Guide that prior to accepting the SVU role, she initially wanted to do comedy, Criminal Minds fans questioning her jump to SVU, "Yeah, people do think it's similar and that's OK. I'm 43 now. I've reached the point where I really can't care what anyone thinks," Brewster continued, "Of course, I do [care]. I'm an actress. I'm totally insecure, but I'm trying to stick to my guns about what is important to me and it doesn't matter what anyone thinks I should or shouldn't do." When her Criminal Minds contract was up she announced she was leaving the show, Brewster saying, "I told my agent and manager, 'Listen, tell me everything that you hear about, but basically I want to do comedy." So when she expressed interest in the offer from SVU, "They called me and they said, 'Are you sure you want to do a law enforcement show?' I asked, 'Do I have scenes with Mariska [Hargitay]?' They said, 'Most of your scenes are with Mariska.' I said, 'I want it. I totally want it.'"

Brewster said of her first guest stint on SVU back in the eighth season, that the role was an "overwhelming" experience. "It was intimidating and challenging and I was afraid that I would do a bad job and it was a character I've never played before. That was exactly the terrifying, exciting learning experience that I wanted when I left Criminal Minds," she says. "I'm not saying anything to denigrate Criminal Minds; that's a great show. I just didn't appreciate it anymore. I appreciate those people, but I realized my heart wasn't in and I needed to go because plenty of people would rip their arm off to be on that show, so they should be." Brewster told The Hollywood Reporter the next day, that she couldn't pass up the SVU gig. "You just don't say no to SVU. Who would? It's pretty much the only cop show that I would do." Warren Leight said to THR about Paget possibly returning to the series throughout the fourteenth season, "There's a potential for [Paget to return beyond the season premiere], but it would be intricate. I'll put it that way," Leight noting Brewster's complex role. "The character that we are asking her to play is not just an exposition carrier; there are a lot of layers."

Brewster said of the comparisons to SVU and Criminal Minds, "They're both extremely different shows and different behind the scenes as well," Brewster noted. "Playing Prentiss for six and a half years on Criminal Minds, at a certain point you're so familiar with the rhythms that you can reach a point where you get lazy. I'm afraid I did that. On SVU, it was actually absolutely terrifying. I felt that the bar was higher." She continued, "[SVU] is intimidating and I think that's what I wanted; it was great to be challenged, excited and nervous and asking for help," she said. "It was a personal and professional experience that I will never be able to thank these guys enough for." Behind the scenes, Brewster noted she enjoyed filming SVU and working with lead Mariska Hargitay. "I honestly think Mariska is one of the funniest women I have ever met. I really look up to her immensely and I just think she's a powerhouse and I enjoy her very much. I have been and will always be a big Mariska fan. I can't say enough good things about her," Brewster said.

The relationship between Benson and Foster is initially hostile, their bond becomes much more complex. "They're sharing information and then, of course, you find out later what becomes of that," Brewster says. "I did very much like the idea of these two strong women in this arena having a meeting of the minds and coming together to facilitate the paths they are each on. Instead of being antagonistic or woman against woman, it's the opposite." Warren Leight said of Paget Brewster's BC ADA Foster, "All of this is falling into her lap. She has a renegade squad that is desperately trying to free the Captain. She has Amaro as the last person to see the dead escort alive. She obviously has pressure from the mayor's office saying, "Clean this up and clean it up now." She's between a rock and a hard place, and her relationship with Olivia is very interesting. Olivia is doing everything she can to free Cragen, and Paget Brewster's character is trying to figure out what the hell happened."

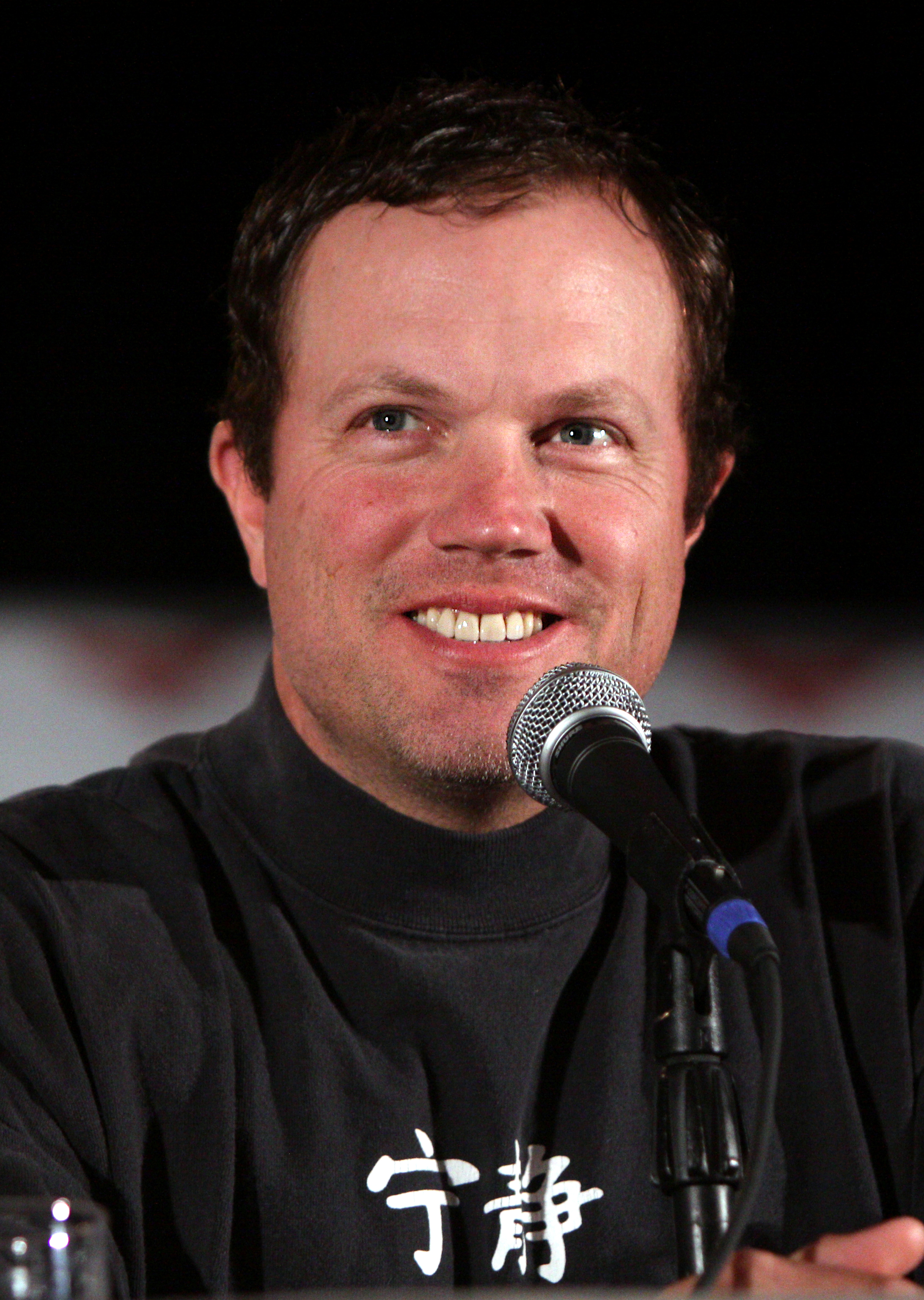
Adam Baldwin (pictured) portrays the interim commanding officer, Captain Steven Harris.

Brewster's character installs an interim commanding officer, Captain Steven Harris (portrayed by Adam Baldwin), while Cragen is suspended and under investigation. Showrunner/EP Warren Leight said of Baldwin's character, "We have a temporary captain coming in, Adam Baldwin, and he’s replacing Cragen because Cragen is not fit for duty at the moment. And Adam’s character is the guy who likes to come into a place... he’s a fixer . He likes to come in and move the pieces around the board and he may try." Leight told TV Guide about Baldwin's Captain Harris character, "He comes into situations that are all screwed up, and his job is to figure out who's straight, who's corrupt, who can he trust to restore order. If he does the job right, he moves on. He's politically connected at NYPD and he likes moving the pieces on the board. That's an interesting guy to throw into SVU, because Olivia and Amaro are pieces that don't like other people moving them."

Sue Simmons will guest star in the season premiere episode as herself. "It’s a big scandal within the world we’ve created, there’s a dead hooker in the captain’s bed, and we go to a newscaster to help us understand the story," said show runner/executive producer Warren Leight, "Sue opens the episode doing a news standup from outside 1 Police Plaza. We’ll bring her back for the second episode of the two-parter." Leight continued that, when the decision was being made to cast the part by using an actor or a real newscaster, "six of us thought of Sue at the same time. We thought maybe she’d want to do it and she said yes immediately. She was thrilled and had a great time." Leight said Simmons didn't need much coaching. "She was terrific. It wasn’t like she needed extra takes," he says, "You never know what you’re going to get [when using real news people] but it wasn’t an issue with Sue. She also had a couple of smart corrections [in the script] as to how she would say something." In particular, he says that Simmons objected to using the word "burgeoning" to identify the scandal in the episode.

== Reception ==
=== Critical response ===
Dani Bradford of TV Equals managed to see the premiere episode prior to the episode's original airing and left a mixed advance review of the episode, saying the premiere was "underwhelming". "I have to admit that I was not a big fan of this premiere. [...] I thought that the plot was too focused on conspiracies and less upon what draws me to the show. For me, Law & Order: SVU has always been about the ripped-from-the-headlines stories and watching how those murders or sexual assaults affect the detectives. It was too much for me to watch two hours of the detectives dealing with a crime of one of their own." Bradford also felt mixed about Detective Amaro's (Pino) involvement in this episode. "Another thing that bothered me was Nick. Forever an Elliot Stabler fan, I guess I am still getting used to his "replacement." These episodes made me long for Elliott even more. Nick seemed too rogue and brooding. He did not interact with anyone and for most of the episodes, I focused my suspicion on him. That is not good when it involves one of the main detectives." Bradford added that; "Law & Order: SVU has long been one of my favorite shows and I am not giving up on it just yet."

Brittany Frederick of Starpulse felt differently about the episode, positively reviewing the episode's continuing storyline and guest stars Paget Brewster and Adam Baldwin. "Foster is a character who could be an incredibly one-dimensional antagonist, and in her first scene, certainly comes off that way. Yet in short order, Brewster is able to establish her as someone sympathetic to the situation, who could be as much an ally as she is an antagonist. She's an immensely likeable actress, which makes it more painful to find out her character isn't all she's cracked up to be. It's a shame that means we won't be seeing Brewster back, because she's a great get for any series." Frederick said of Baldwin's Harris, "Baldwin never gives a bad performance, and while he's pretty much here to poke and prod the detectives, he chews the scenery well."

Frederick added, "While there's a lot of talk about the Law & Order formula, SVU has made its name on fleshing out its ensemble within that framework, and that's still what it's best at. While there's a certain amount of playing by numbers that comes with the brand name, these two hours establish that even after thirteen seasons, there's still plenty to explore with these characters, and season fourteen should continue the momentum established by its predecessor. Don't sleep on Special Victims Unit."

Darlene Burton of Examiner positively reviewed the episode as well, along with guest star Paget Brewster and stars Mariska Hargitay and Danny Pino, "The premiere, advertised with the tagline "everybody has secrets", started off with a bang and left viewers on the edge of their seat throughout the entire two hours. Mariska Hargitay continued to demonstrate why she is an Emmy winner and Paget Brewster did an exceptional job as Bureau Chief ADA Paula Foster. However, the surprising performance of the night came from Danny Pino who showed that he is a worthy replacement for Meloni. Pino's intensity radiated through the screen as his character Nick Amaro dealt with his wife and daughter's departure, accusations that he was inappropriate with a dead prostitute and being on the outs with his team." Burton added, The classic "whodunit" storyline kept Twitter fans guessing as the hashtag #Free Cragen trended worldwide last night. The feedback from fans online has been very positive with some commenting that they will begin watching again after taking last season off due to the absence of Meloni.

On Huffington Post, former sex crimes prosecutor Allison Leotta said that "SVU opened its season with a roller-coaster of a double episode." Leotta gave the episode an "A−", saying "Perhaps the least plausible part of the story, however, was that Cragen hired those prostitutes just for their conversation and companionship. Still, it was a strong episode, well-written, compelling and grounded in authentic details. I'm looking forward to seeing what the rest of the season brings!"

=== Ratings ===
In its original American broadcast on September 26, 2012, both "Lost Reputation" and "Above Suspicion" aired as a two-hour season premiere on NBC, viewed by 7.19 million viewers and acquired a 2.1 rating/6% share in the age 18–49 demographic. "Lost Reputation" and "Above Suspicion" were the most watched programs on NBC that night, beating new episodes of its lead-ins Guys With Kids, and Animal Practice. "Lost Reputation" was the third ranked program in the timeslot under season premiere episodes of Criminal Minds on CBS and Modern Family on ABC.
