= Law & Order: Special Victims Unit season 14 =

Season of American television series

Law & Order: Special Victims Unit
- Season 14
- Season 14 U.S. DVD cover
- Starring: Mariska Hargitay; Danny Pino; Kelli Giddish; Richard Belzer; Ice-T; Dann Florek
- No. of episodes: 24

Release
- Original network: NBC
- Original release: September 26, 2012 – May 22, 2013

Season chronology
- ← Previous; Season 13 Next → Season 15

The fourteenth season of Law & Order: Special Victims Unit debuted with a two-part premiere episode on September 26, 2012, at 9pm/8c - 11pm/10c (Eastern) on NBC, which was the show's weekly time slot.

The fourteenth season picked up storyline-wise where the last season left off, with Captain Cragen (Dann Florek) awaking to a dead sex worker in his bed with her throat slit. The two-part season premiere was watched by 7.19 million total viewers and received generally positive reviews. The series' landmark 300th episode fell this season and aired on October 24, 2012, watched by 6.77 million total viewers. This is the first season of SVU to have any kind of crossover with now-ended Law & Order spinoff Law & Order: Criminal Intent, with Kathryn Erbe guest starring in two episodes "Acceptable Loss" and "Poisoned Motive" as her LOCI character, Alexandra Eames, and Denis O'Hare guest starring in the episode "Presumed Guilty" as his LOCI character, Father Shea.

== Production ==
Law & Order: Special Victims Unit was renewed for a fourteenth season on May 9, 2012. Prior to the season fourteen renewal, cast members Ice-T (Detective Fin Tutuola) and Mariska Hargitay (Detective Olivia Benson) had already renewed their contracts through the fourteenth season. Ice-T announced on Twitter that filming on the fourteenth season began on Monday, July 23, 2012.

In May 2012, show runner/executive producer Warren Leight said that the story line for season fourteen would pick up where the thirteenth-season finale left off: "In fact, there were a number of scenes we shot that didn't make it into this cut that may make it into the next one. ... It's good to know who did it and why, and who's pulling the strings". On July 30, 2012, Leight confirmed the season premiere would be a two-part episode and Leight told Today, after talking about the returning guest stars from "Rhodium Nights": "We may want to do more of that this season", he said. The issue, he pointed out, is "how do you distinguish the 294th episode of 'SVU' from the others? I wanted to give people a reason to come back to season 14. The show deserves a good cliffhanger, and I loved reading people's responses after the finale ended -- 'Did they just do that?'" Leight continued, "People have us in a box", he said, "and I want them to see that the show is a little more adventurous than they might have remembered". In September, Leight said in an interview with TV Guide that this season's theme would revolve around "everybody having secrets".

On September 17, 2012, both Mariska Hargitay and Danny Pino tweeted that filming on SVU episode 300 started. Mariska tweeted "Can't believe we started filming our 300 episode today! #svu" and Pino tweeted with, "Congrats on 300 SVU's. Proud 2 contribute 28 to the tally. #quality&quantity".

Production on season 14 of Law & Order: SVU (along with other New York City based TV series) was halted by NBC starting October 29, 2012, in the wake of Hurricane Sandy. Show runner/executive producer Warren Leight tweeted on October 30, "SVU cast and crew seem to be safe. Our stages, and many of us, in the dark. Our thoughts and prayers to all suffering in Sandy's wake". Ice-T tweeted on November 1, 2012, "SANDY Update: SVU production shut down all week. No power on set". Law & Order: SVU's home studio on Chelsea Piers had water damage and a loss of electrical power; according to a note on the complex's website, "The city has not issued any location permits this week, so probably the earliest we'll be able to shoot is this weekend", said Warren Leight to NECN. "We are able to do some location scouting tomorrow (November 2, 2012) and we have our production meetings by phone, with people on their cells and calling from their cars. The main issue is going to be getting power restored." Mayor Michael Bloomberg's office said it would not issue permits for outdoor filming in the city's five boroughs until at least Friday, citing concerns about safety and the ongoing cleanup.

Ice-T tweeted on November 2, 2012: "Just made it to the SVU set on location in Riverdale NY. My trailer has power, TV and heat. I need to take this MF home!" Leight posted a tweet quoting the poem "Invictus" earlier in the day, "#SVU cast and crew somehow resumed shooting this morning. We are muddied but unbowed". At the production blog on the official website, they note the storm hit while episodes "Lessons Learned", and "Dream Deferred" were being shot; they couldn't get back into the studio or production office for weeks due to flooding.

On December 6, 2012, NBC ordered an additional two episodes for this season, bringing the total to 24. The season finale aired on May 22, 2013.

== Cast ==
=== Main ===
- Mariska Hargitay as Senior Detective Olivia Benson
- Danny Pino as Junior Detective Nick Amaro
- Kelli Giddish as Junior Detective Amanda Rollins
- Richard Belzer as Senior Detective Sergeant John Munch
- Ice-T as Senior Detective Odafin "Fin" Tutuola
- Dann Florek as Captain Donald "Don" Cragen

=== Special guest star ===
- Carolyn McCormick as Dr. Elizabeth Olivet
- BD Wong as FBI Special Agent Dr. George Huang

=== Recurring ===
- Adam Baldwin as Interim Captain Steven Harris
- Max Baker as Colin Bennett
- Ami Brabson as Judge Karyn Blake
- Stephen C. Bradbury as Judge Colin McNamara
- Reg E. Cathey as Defense Attorney Barry Querns
- Kathryn Erbe as Homeland Security Task Force Lieutenant Alexandra Eames
- Raúl Esparza as Assistant District Attorney Rafael Barba
- Allison Fernandez as Zara Amaro
- Sue Kim as Detective Emily Ling
- Sonia Manzano as Judge Gloria Pepitone
- Elizabeth Marvel as Defense Attorney Rita Calhoun
- Michael Mastro as Judge Serani
- Andrea Navedo as Cynthia Mancheno
- Jessica Phillips as Assistant District Attorney Pippa Cox
- Lindsay Pulsipher as Kim Rollins
- Jaden Matthew Rodriguez as Gil Mancheno
- Steve Rosen as Defense Attorney Michael Guthrie
- Sue Simmons as Newscaster Sue Simmons
- Jeffrey Tambor as Defense Attorney Ben Cohen
- Karen Tsen Lee as Medical Examiner Susan Chung
- Tamara Tunie as Medical Examiner Dr. Melinda Warner
- Dean Winters as Detective Brian Cassidy
- Scott William Winters as Detective Robert Dumas

=== Guest stars ===
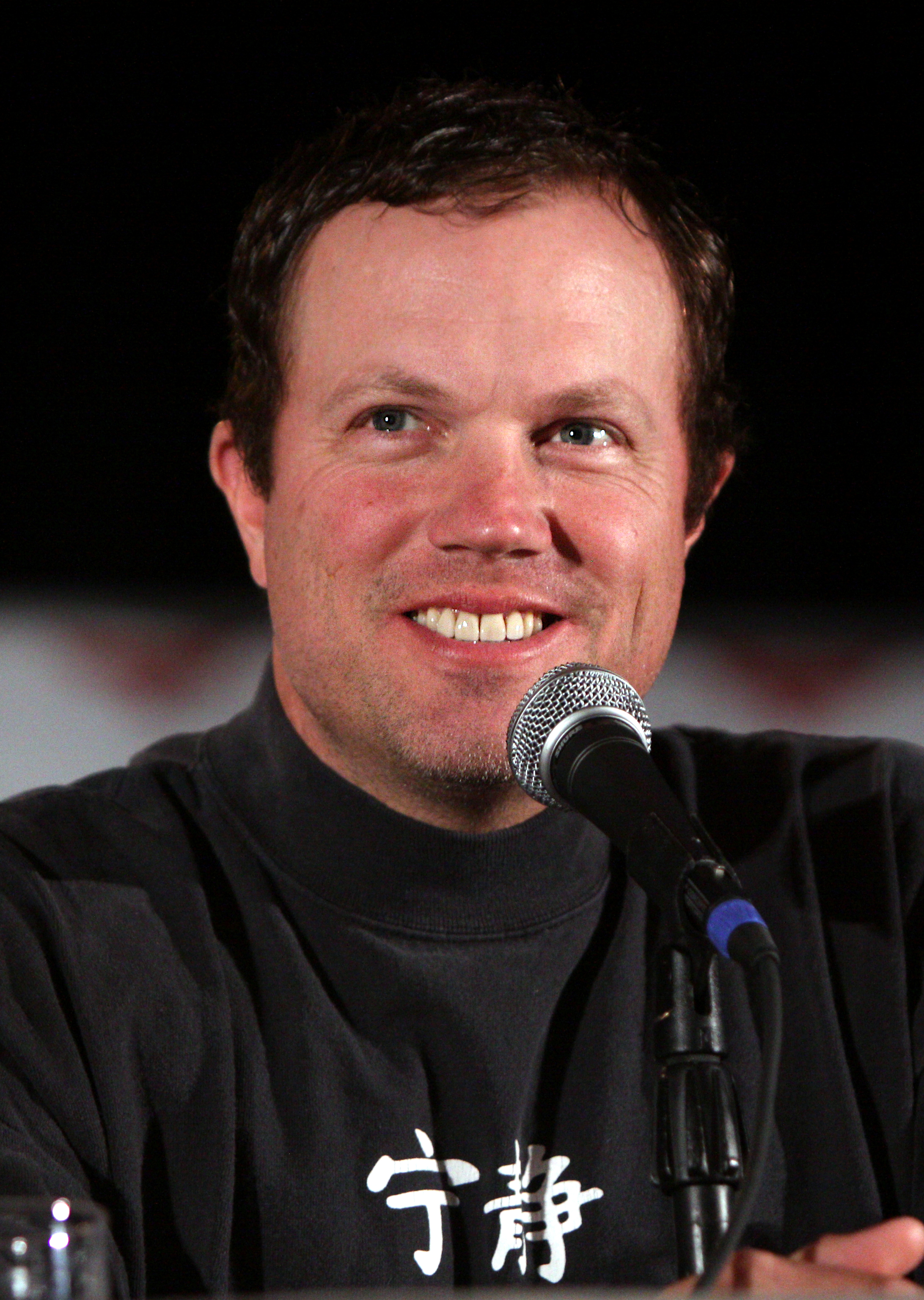
Adam Baldwin portrays the SVU interim commanding officer, Captain Steven Harris for the first three episodes of the season.

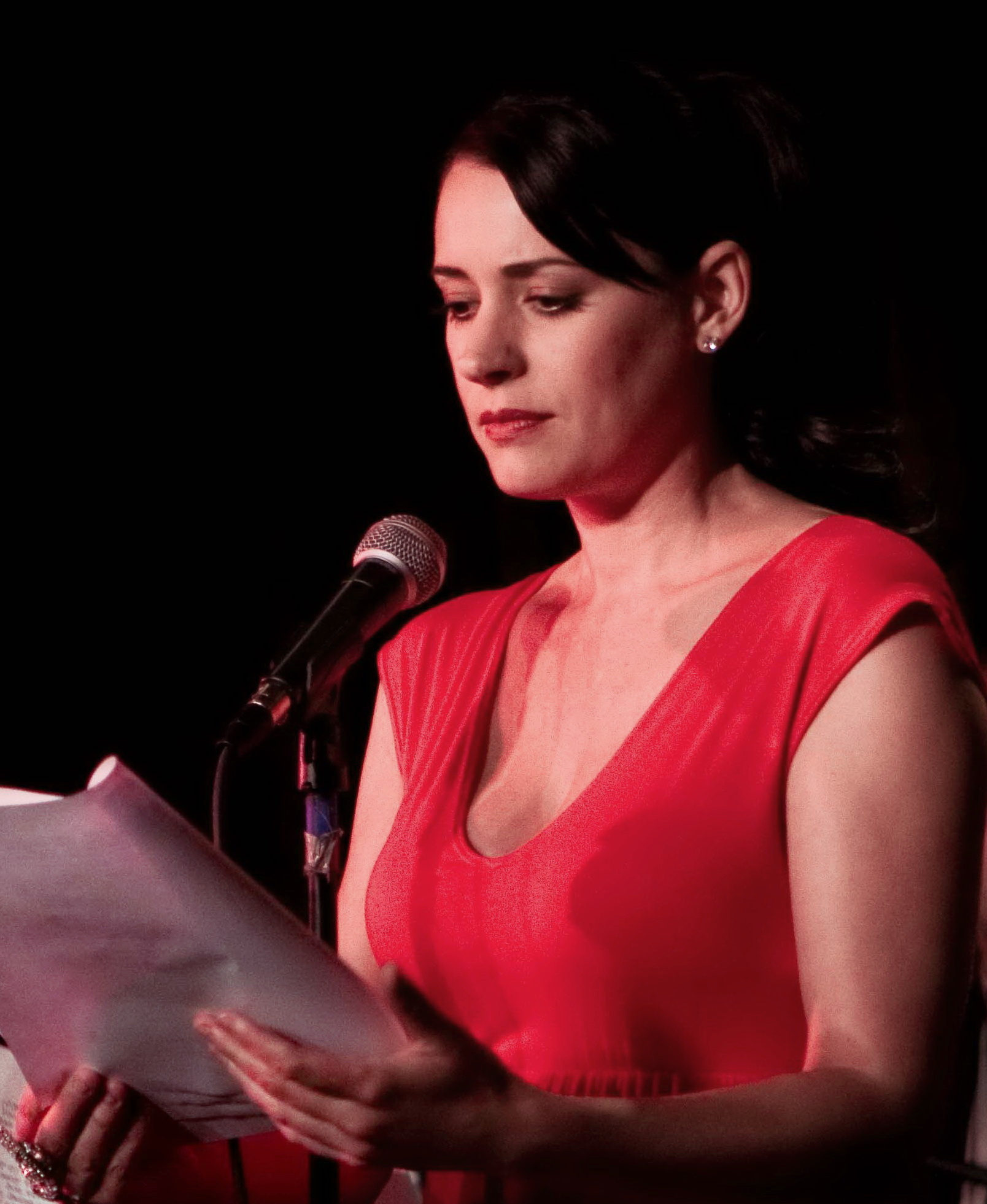
Criminal Minds star Paget Brewster, portrays Paula Foster, the Bureau Chief ADA of the Public Integrity Unit who has been assigned the case against Captain Cragen.

Dean Winters, who came back in "Rhodium Nights" to portray Detective Brian Cassidy, returned for the season premiere episodes, along with guest stars Peter Jacobson (Bart Ganzel), Pippa Black (Carrissa Gibson), Ron Rifkin (Defense Attorney Marvin Exley), Brooke Smith (Delia Wilson), and Laura Benanti as Marie Amaro. On January 4, 2013, Warren Leight tweeted the Cassidy character (Dean Winters) may appear again in the spring.

Paget Brewster guest starred as Paula Foster, the Bureau Chief ADA of the Public Integrity Unit in the District Attorney's office. Her character is assigned to the case against Captain Cragen (Dann Florek), who is suspected of murder after what occurred in the episode "Rhodium Nights", in which Cragen woke up with a dead prostitute (Pippa Black) in his bed. Brewster has guest starred on SVU before, in the eighth season episode, "Scheherazade", as the daughter of an elderly dying man, believed to be a murderer. Brewster's character installs an interim commanding officer, Captain Steven Harris (portrayed by Adam Baldwin), while Cragen is suspended and under investigation. Sue Simmons also guest starred in the season premiere episodes as herself. "It's a big scandal within the world we've created, there’s a dead hooker in the captain's bed, and we go to a newscaster to help us understand the story," said show runner/executive producer Warren Leight, "Sue opens the episode doing a news standup from outside 1 Police Plaza. We’ll bring her back for the second episode of the two-parter."

Roger Bart, Anna Chlumsky, and Raúl Esparza guest starred in the episode "Twenty-Five Acts". Chlumsky plays the author of a best-selling erotic novel, who accuses a high-profile talk show host (Roger Bart) of a brutal rape. However, the SVU squad gets suspicious when they discover her account of the rape mimics the chapters in her book. The squad, along with the DA's office (Raúl Esparza as ADA Barba), also struggles to keep the case from turning into a media frenzy. Kathryn Erbe guest starred in the episode "Acceptable Loss" as her Law & Order: Criminal Intent character, Detective Alexandra Eames, who is now working for a joint City/Federal Homeland Security Task Force (and promoted to Lieutenant), Eames crosses paths with the SVU squad when their investigation of a sex trafficking ring uncovers a connection to terrorists. Warren Leight tweeted Erbe would be in the fourth episode of the season.

Tom Sizemore, Hamish Linklater, and Alex Karpovsky guest starred in the 300th episode of Law & Order: Special Victims Unit, titled "Manhattan Vigil". Longtime fans will be happy to know contains many nods to the series' pilot — Linklater played a man from a successful real estate family whose son goes missing. Showrunner/executive producer Warren Leight told TV Line, about Linklater's character, "His family is involved in the gentrification of Morningside Heights," where some of the episode is set, Leight said. Karpovsky portrayed an auxiliary police officer, and Sizemore played a man employed by Linklater's character's family. Lindsay Pulsipher portrayed Kim Rollins, Detective Amanda Rollins' (Kelli Giddish) troubled sister in the episode "Friending Emily". Pulsipher will be in more than one episode in this season.

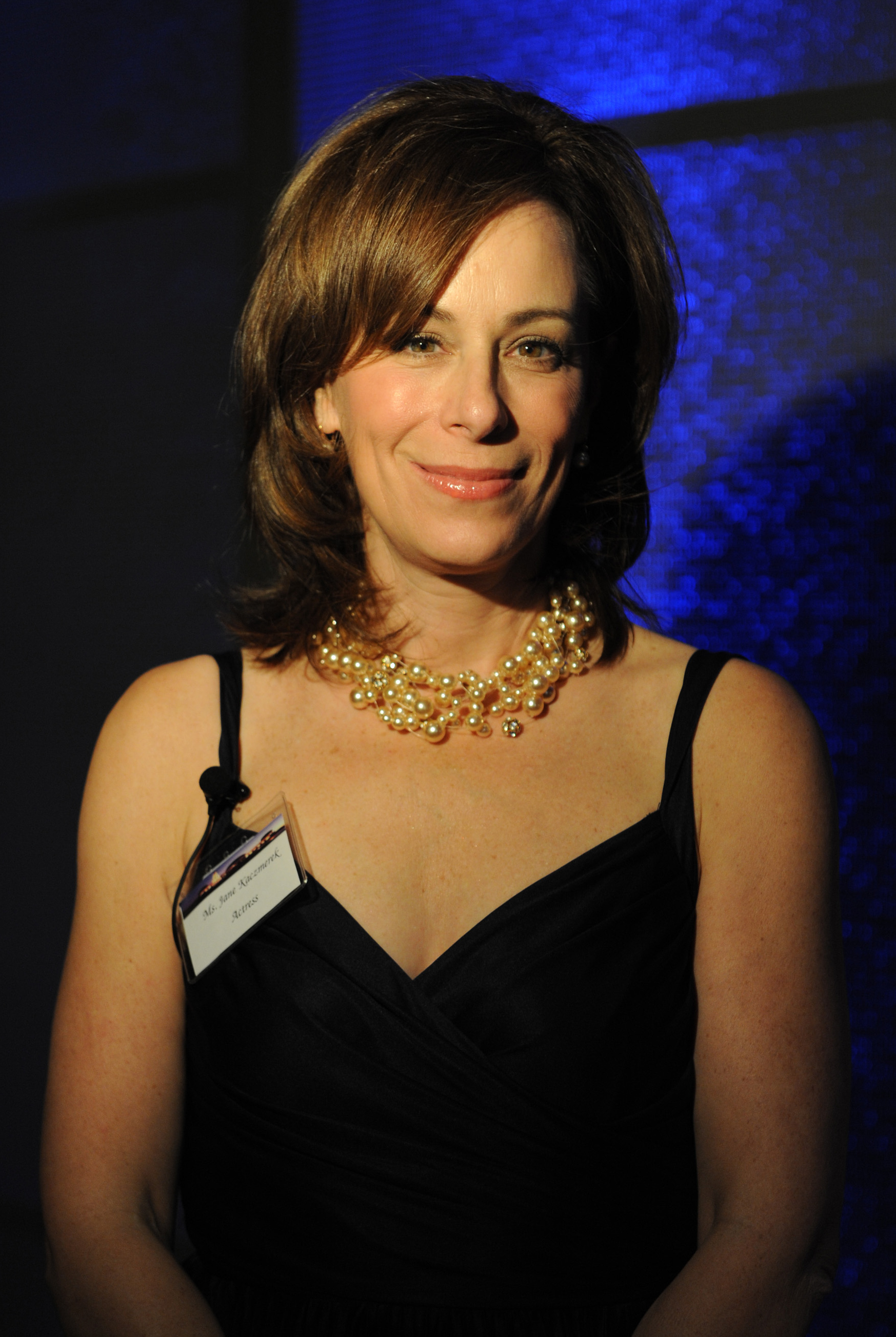
Jane Kaczmarek guest starred in "Beautiful Frame" as Suffolk County DA Pam James.

Scott Bakula guest starred in the episode "Vanity's Bonfire" as a lawyer who's being considered for the U.S. Supreme Court and is accused of fathering a child outside of marriage. "People might make the comparisons to John Edwards", Warren Leight said, referring to the onetime Democratic hopeful who admitted to having a child with his mistress. Elliott Gould and Charles Grodin guest starred in the episode "Lessons Learned", which is inspired by the Penn State child sex abuse scandal and Jerry Sandusky. On November 20, 2012, showrunner/EP Warren Leight tweeted that along with Gould and Grodin; Buck Henry, Frank Wood, Robert Sella, Anthony Rapp, and Elizabeth Marvel would also be guest starring in "Lessons Learned".

Patricia Arquette and Anne Meara guest starred as daughter and mother in the SVU episode "Dreams Deferred". The episode revolved around an armed and dangerous man who goes on a killing spree with Arquette's Jeannie - a prostitute with whom he has a long-standing relationship - representing the last person he calls. When Jeannie goes missing, the SVU is tasked with convincing their NYPD cohorts that her life is worth saving. Meara played Jeannie's mother, Irene, who worries for her daughter's health and safety. The duo joined previously announced guest star Jason Gedrick in the episode. Denis O'Hare guest starred in "Presumed Guilty" as Father Shea, a priest who is pulled from his car and brutally beaten. O'Hare played Father Shea in the Law & Order: Criminal Intent episode "Last Rites" under showrunner/executive producer Warren Leight in 2008. This marks O'Hare's second stint on SVU, following an appearance in 2000. He guest-starred on the original Law & Order four times, most recently in 2003 also playing a priest, Father Hogan. Erik LaRay Harvey portrayed Sam Randall, Detective Tutuola's ex-wife's brother in the episode. Despite Sam's former criminal record and various stints behind bars, Fin doesn't think Sam is their man and asks his SVU partners for help getting to the bottom of the case. Theo Rossi also guest stars in the episode as Enrique Rodriguez, a working-class Catholic who is determined to seek justice for his sister when he finds that she was part of a church cover-up.

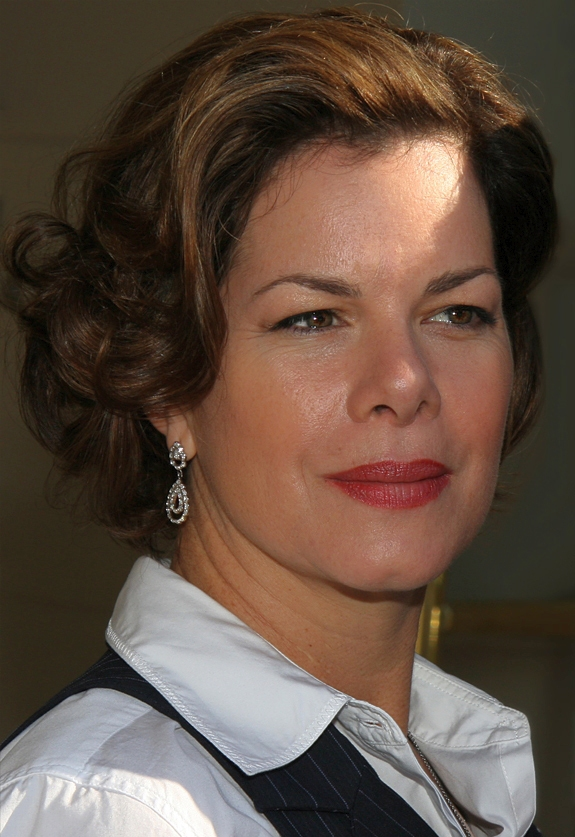
Marcia Gay Harden has thus far appeared four times in the series, her last appearance being in the fourteenth-season episode "Secrets Exhumed".

Jane Kaczmarek guest starred in the episode "Beautiful Frame", as Suffolk County District Attorney Pamela James, who lands the same murder case as ADA Barba (Raúl Esparza). However, while James arrests an SVU rape victim for the crime, Barba and the SVU team like a different suspect for the murder. The trials start simultaneously and both prosecutors must fight for a conviction before the other can destroy their case. In "Beautiful Frame", Yvonne Zima portrayed a rape victim in an SVU case who is arrested for the murder of her ex-boyfriend. Suffolk County DA Pam James (Kaczmarek) lands the case and swiftly brings charges against the young woman. Detective Benson questions the circumstances of the arrest and gathers enough evidence for ADA Barba to levy charges in Manhattan against another suspect. The two ambitious District Attorneys square off in separate trials for the same murder, hoping to get a conviction before the other derails their case. Nia Vardalos appeared in an episode titled, "Criminal Hatred", (airing January 30, 2013), Vardalos portrayed Counselor Minonna Efron, whose client is on trial for assault and murder. Vardalos' character is described as "disorganized", which makes ADA Barba (Raúl Esparza) think he's got an easy win, but the character winds up thwarting him at every turn. Victoria Rowell also guest stars and Fred Norris makes a cameo appearance.

Marcia Gay Harden returned as FBI Agent Dana Lewis in "Secrets Exhumed," (aired February 6, 2013). Agent Lewis partners with the SVU when she suspects a rape-murder case is connected to several cases across the country. This marked Harden's fourth episode on SVU. Harold Perrineau guest starred in the same episode as career criminal Brian Traymor, Jay Karnes also guest stars. The band Jane's Addiction's Dave Navarro guest starred in the episode "Funny Valentine" as a sound engineer (instead of a musician), named Ferrari who is a part of the entourage for one of hip-hop's rising stars. Ferrari witnesses a crime, but refuses to rat out his friend. Navarro hinted at his appearance on Twitter prior before TV Guide announced it, "On my way to NYC to hang out with Detective Benson for a day", he tweeted about star Mariska Hargitay. Jeffrey Tambor guest starred in "Funny Valentine" as well, in a role that's a change of pace for the actor. Tambor has been cast as Ben Cohen, an attorney hired to defend a popular hip-hop artist after his arrest by the SVU. While Tambor's TV characters are often quite bizarre, Cohen is described as being no-nonsense and perhaps a bit overconfident in the popularity of his star client in court.

BD Wong guest starred as Dr. George Huang in the 19th episode entitled "Born Psychopath". This was Wong's second appearance on the show after his departure in season 12.

Eion Bailey guest starred in the episode, "Traumatic Wound" (May 1, 2013), as former Military veteran, who might hold the key to why as a young girl who was attacked at a concert. Jeffrey Tambor reprised his role as attorney, Ben Cohen, in this episode.

In the May 8 episode, Fin's Narcotics past caught up with him, when a friend (2 Chainz) needed a helping hand and landed Fin in trouble, which prompted a return visit for Kathryn Erbe as Lt. Alexandra Eames. This episode also guest starred: Emilio Rivera, Yul Vazquez and Cathy Moriarty.

Richard Thomas starred in the May 15 episode, "Brief Interlude", as a husband and father, whose wife, Kerry Butler, was attacked while attending music festivals in New York City.

Pablo Schreiber and Lauren Ambrose guest star in the season finale (May 22), that starts out as a routine arrest by Detective Rollins and ends up becoming much worse.

==== Mike Tyson casting controversy ====
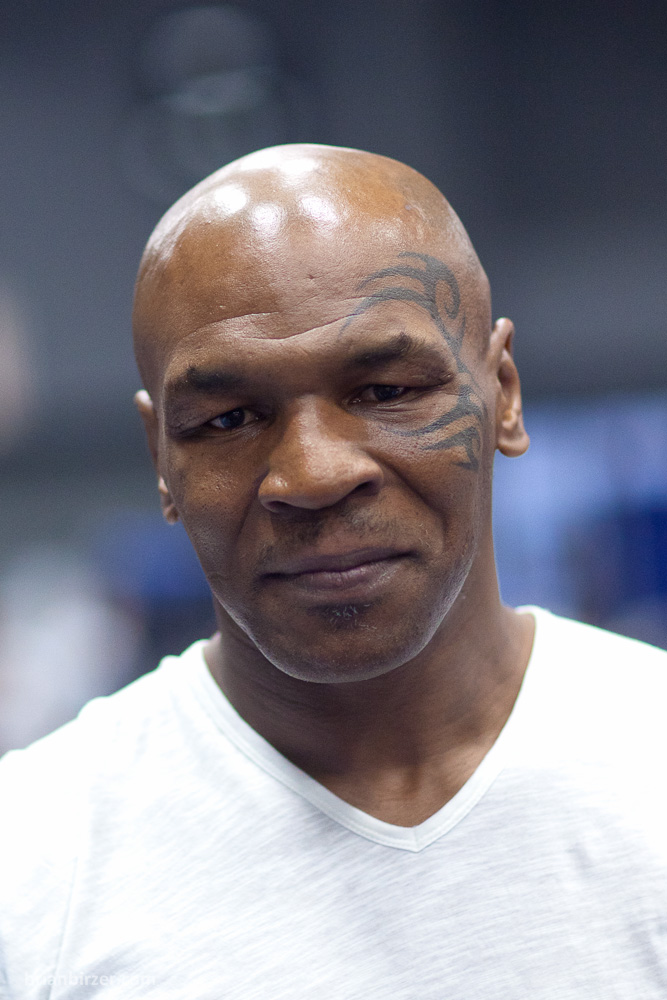
Former boxer, Mike Tyson was arrested for rape in 1991 and was sentenced for 6 years in prison, serving only 3 years.

On January 10, 2013, NBC announced that former boxer Mike Tyson had been cast to guest star in the episode "Monster's Legacy" (which also stars Ed Asner). Due to Mike Tyson's rape conviction in 1992, this triggered a series of protests by fans and sexual assault survivors, who felt that a TV series whose goal is partly to speak out against sex crimes should not help boost the career of a convicted rapist.

At least three Change.org petitions were created to convince NBC to reverse the decision, the most popular one started by Marcie Kaveney. On January 19, 2013, Pauley Perrette, a star of NCIS, a fan of SVU and a rape survivor herself, stated her disapproval of the casting choice on Twitter. She included a link to Kaveney's petition which caused the number of signatures to shoot up to over 15,000. In an interview with The Wrap Kaveney revealed that "As soon as I saw it, I was just floored by the news, 'SVU' is a show I've followed for a long time... I think survivors consider this their show" and stated, "I don't know if it's for ratings or to clean up Mike Tyson's image." In response to the plot summary of "Monster's Legacy" she also opined that giving Tyson this particular sympathetic role is a form of rape apology. "It's kind of being a rape apologist, saying 'Maybe he's had this violent childhood and that's why he's become this violent person.'"

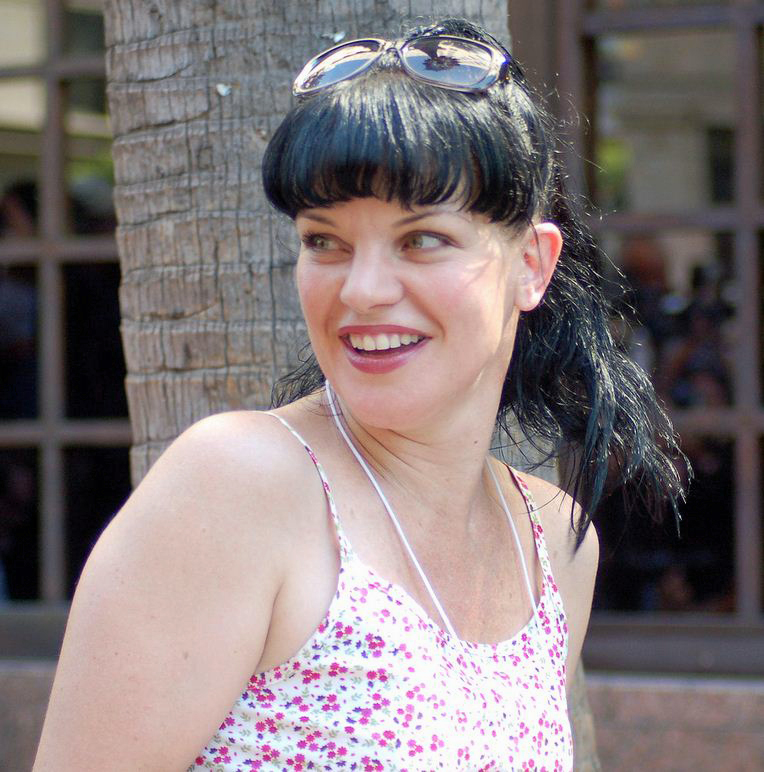
NCIS star Pauley Perrette said via Twitter that she supported the SVU petition to keep Mike Tyson off the series.

Further criticism came from Lindy West of Jezebel who wrote on January 25, 2013 that an appearance by Mike Tyson would be hypocritical to the message of the show: "In addition to being a colossal display of poor taste, Mike Tyson playing a murderer on SVU is directly counter to the implied mission of the show. Either you're a genuine advocate for victims, or you don't give a shit. You don't get to do both." On the same day, the Joyful Heart Foundation released a statement apologizing to the viewers who feel betrayed. While the executives of the JHF reiterated that they have no say over the production of SVU episodes, they indicated that "We were not aware of this casting choice and we have formally expressed our concerns to the executives and producers at SVU." Despite being the foundation's president, the personal opinion of Mariska Hargitay, whose contract with NBC contains a publicity clause, was not mentioned.

Warren Leight began responding to the controversy on January 12, 2013, by writing a seven-part tweet "We understand the casting of Mike Tyson seems inappropriate to some SVU fans. While in no way excusing his past actions, it's worth noting MT was convicted over twenty years ago, and served his time. In recent years he has found sobriety, and started a foundation to meet the comprehensive needs of children from broken homes. The episode itself deals with many issues, including the ongoing effects of childhood abuse, the possibility of rehabilitation, and the potential for disastrous results when individuals and/or the justice system pre-judge or fail to contextualize. Because of SVU's subject matter, all of us have a profound sense of our responsibility. Our intent, as always, is to provoke discussion and awareness. We ask you to keep an open mind. Thanks." On January 21, 2013 after receiving further complaints, he followed up with "...please know that I’ve heard you. When tweets become harassment, I will have to block. Thnx."

"I'm sorry that she has a difference of opinion, but she's entitled to it, I'm sorry that she's not happy. [But] I didn't rape nobody or do anything like that, and this lady wasn't there to know if I did or not. I don't trip on that stuff. I'm not trying to get rich and famous; I'm just trying to feed my family. Why should they care? Since I'm clean and sober five years, I haven't broken any laws or did any crimes. I'm just trying to live my life."

— Mike Tyson to TV Guide.

Mike Tyson, who had already made his excitement known in a tweet, shared his thoughts about the role in a subsequent interview. This took place on January 29, 2013, after the petition against his casting had gained momentum. Viewing his character as a separate person and not a fictionalized version of himself, Tyson said, "I have no emotional connection to the role. As a human being I can relate to it, but it has nothing to do with me." He also mentioned being a fan of SVU, calling it "the most exciting show on TV" and saying "My wife [Lakiha Spicer, whom he wed in 2009] and I looked on this show a lot, especially when I was going through my relapse and drug periods." In response to the criticism, Tyson maintained, as he has since 1992, that he was innocent of raping Desiree Washington. With the filming of his episode complete, he also commented that Mariska Hargitay was "very quiet" on the set of SVU.

"It focuses on what can happen when there is an emotionally charged rush to judgment and it is, in my opinion, one of our strongest episodes in the last five years."

— SVU creator Dick Wolf to Deadline.

Adding to the controversy surrounding the casting choice was that the air date originally planned, February 13, 2013, coincided with One Billion Rising, a global movement to end violence against women and girls. On January 30, NBC switched "Monster's Legacy" with "Secrets Exhumed" so that Tyson's episode would air on February 6 instead. Four days before the episode, Law & Order creator Dick Wolf announced that he supported NBC's decision to produce the episode and hire Mike Tyson to guest star. This angered fans, as he did not acknowledge any of the petitions or ethical concerns. "Monster's Legacy" aired on February 6, 2013, becoming Mike Tyson's first acting appearance not playing himself.

"Monster's Legacy" continued to be a point of discussion in the years that followed with Megan Garber of The Atlantic calling the casting of Mike Tyson "one significant lapse of judgement". Dylan Matthews, while having positive reviews of the episode, wrote that the "stunt casting" was unnecessary.

== Episodes ==
Law & Order: Special Victims Unit season 14 episodes
No. overall	No. in season	Title	Directed by	Written by	Original release date	Prod. code	U.S. viewers (millions)
296	1	"Lost Reputation"	Michael Slovis	Warren Leight & Julie Martin	September 26, 2012	1401	7.19
The Special Victims Unit is reeling from the fallout after Captain Cragen wakes up with a dead escort - a potential witness in an SVU case - in his bed. Tensions at the precinct are high as the detectives contend with Bureau Chief ADA Paula Foster's (Paget Brewster) investigation of Cragen, as well as the arrival of a tough new captain, Steven Harris (Adam Baldwin). Brian Cassidy (Dean Winters) treads an increasingly narrow line as an undercover cop in Bart Ganzel's (Peter Jacobson) escort organization, as Detective Amaro struggles with the case and his marriage.
297	2	"Above Suspicion"	Michael Slovis	Julie Martin & Warren Leight	September 26, 2012	1402	7.19
The murder case against Cragen continues as Amaro ventures off on his own to find answers – while trying to deal with his wife separating from him in the process – and get down to the truth. Meanwhile, a tragic accident happens to one of the detectives, causing Detective Benson to vent her frustration to Captain Harris and IAB. BC-ADA Foster resumes her inquiries, and as she closes the case, Benson and the SVU squad discover a secret of their own. Delia, the Madame who set up Cragen, was paying for Foster's daughter's medical treatment. Benson extracts a confession from Foster but Foster tells Benson that she is taking a mother away from her daughter. At the station, Benson offers to talk to Amaro about their feelings about the case. Benson asks the substitute Captain what will happen to Foster's daughter and he tells her she did the right thing.
298	3	"Twenty-Five Acts"	Jean de Segonzac	Story by : Warren Leight & Julie Martin; Teleplay by : John P. Roche	October 10, 2012	1403	6.24
With Cragen still on suspension, the young author of a wildly successful S&M romance novel, Jocelyn Paley (Anna Chlumsky) goes home with famous television show host Adam Cain (Roger Bart), who forces himself on her. Detectives Benson and Rollins are paired up by Captain Harris to work to convince the victim to file charges, with the help of new Assistant DA Rafael Barba (Raúl Esparza). As the SVU squad digs into her background to uncover potential trial pitfalls and Barba rushes to push forward with the trial, Amaro uncovers a secret that threatens to destroy the young woman's career as well as her case.: First appearance of Raúl Esparza as ADA Rafael Barba; Inspired by the E. L. James erotic novel, Fifty Shades of Grey, and the trial of former Canadian radio host Jian Ghomeshi.
299	4	"Acceptable Loss"	Alex Chapple	Ed Zuckerman	October 17, 2012	1404	6.25
With Cragen back in the precinct, the Special Victims Unit is in full force and working to expose a sex trafficking operation that enslaves young women. The detectives go undercover and are on the verge of cracking the case when their efforts are halted by Lieutenant Alexandra Eames (Kathryn Erbe), who claims it's a long-running terrorism case. Benson gets creative with their investigation, while trying not to interfere with Eames' case.
300	5	"Manhattan Vigil"	Jean de Segonzac	Peter Blauner	October 24, 2012	1405	6.77
In the series' landmark 300th episode, Wyatt Morris (Luke Fava), a young boy from Morningside Heights, is kidnapped while in the care of his father David (Hamish Linklater), and the investigation reminds Cragen, Benson and Sergeant Munch of an unsolved kidnapping that occurred in the same neighborhood thirteen years ago. While the entire squad races against the clock to find the missing boy, Benson vows to learn from past mistakes to set both cases right.: This episode's cold open features the Norah Jones song "Waiting" from her album The Fall.
301	6	"Friending Emily"	Jim McKay	Kevin Fox	October 31, 2012	1406	6.05
An underage girl (Catherine Missal) disappears after following her older sister (Taylor Spreitler) to a college party in Manhattan. The detectives mobilize to recover the missing girl but find themselves thwarted by a high-tech kidnapper using the internet to cover his tracks. As the case hits a dead end, Barba returns with some unlikely help. Meanwhile, Rollins is distracted by the sudden appearance of her very troubled sister Kim (Lindsay Pulsipher), who is causing problems for Amanda.
302	7	"Vanity's Bonfire"	Michael Slovis	Story by : Gwendolyn Parker & Warren Leight; Teleplay by : Gwendolyn Parker	November 14, 2012	1407	5.78
The abduction of a baby named Tessa Leddy from a city playground quickly turns into a custody dispute when the kidnapper, Dia Nobile (Bijou Phillips), swears she is the child's biological mother. The Leddys claim their daughter was born by a surrogate mother, whom they never met, but later learn that the girl isn't their daughter at all. Nobile also claims the father is a high-powered legal expert, Kent Webster (Scott Bakula), who is married to a cancer stricken wife (Jessica Hecht), sending the unit on an investigation that forever changes the lives of two unsuspecting families.: Inspired by scandals surrounding Senator John Edwards.
303	8	"Lessons Learned"	Alex Chapple	Story by : Julie Martin & Ed Zuckerman; Teleplay by : Ed Zuckerman & John P. Roche	November 21, 2012	1408	5.20
A professor's unusual encounter with Amaro sends the SVU on an investigation into reports of sexual abuse at a prestigious private school. Stonewalled by the school board, Benson and Barba enlist former students and Professor Walter Tompkins (Elliott Gould), a retired teacher, to help reveal a massive cover-up as more victims emerge. As the detectives manage to get their hands on key evidence linked to one of the victims, the school throws up a roadblock in court until another former student comes forward.: Inspired by the Penn State child sex abuse scandal and the Horace Mann School abuse scandal.
304	9	"Dreams Deferred"	Michael Smith	Julie Martin & Warren Leight	December 5, 2012	1409	6.16
When a man (P.J. Brown) goes on a killing rampage through New York, FBI Agent Cantwell (Jason Gedrick) calls upon the SVU squad to get information from the man's last known contact, a prostitute named Jeannie Kerns (Patricia Arquette), who was involved in one of Benson's old cases. As the detectives work with her to track down the killer, they find themselves drawn into her world and must fight to save her life.
305	10	"Presumed Guilty"	Courtney Hunt	Kevin Fox	January 2, 2013	1410	7.73
The SVU's holiday celebrations are disrupted when Detective Tutuola's ex-brother-in-law (Erik Laray Harvey) is arrested for assaulting a priest (Denis O'Hare). Convinced of his innocence despite his criminal record, Fin asks the detectives to find evidence that exonerates him, and in the process, a buried church scandal begins to unravel.
306	11	"Beautiful Frame"	Jean de Segonzac	Peter Blauner	January 9, 2013	1411	8.42
When a rape victim (Yvonne Zima) in an SVU case is arrested for the murder of her ex-boyfriend (Joseph Masi), Suffolk County DA Pam James (Jane Kaczmarek) lands the case and swiftly brings charges against the young woman. Benson questions the circumstances of the arrest and gathers enough evidence for Barba to levy charges in Manhattan against another suspect (Enver Gjokaj). The two ambitious DA's square off in separate trials for the same murder, hoping to get a conviction before the other derails their case.
307	12	"Criminal Hatred"	Adam Bernstein	Ed Zuckerman	January 30, 2013	1412	6.42
When the SVU detectives arrest a man (Max Carpenter) who targets and brutally attacks other men, specifically those who are gay, Barba tries a difficult murder case against an unpredictable defense attorney (Nia Vardalos).
308	13	"Monster's Legacy"	Jean de Segonzac	Story by : Warren Leight & Julie Martin; Teleplay by : John P. Roche	February 6, 2013	1414	5.23
After discovering multiple convicted felons could have been victims of sexual assault, Benson asks Bayard Ellis (Andre Braugher) to reopen the case of a murderer on death row, Reggie Rhodes (Mike Tyson) and secrets about his childhood, as well as his murder trial are revealed.
309	14	"Secrets Exhumed"	Laura Belsey	Warren Leight & Julie Martin	February 13, 2013	1413	6.35
After Munch brings in a 1980s cold case, the detectives fly to Miami to apprehend the suspect (Harold Perrineau). When FBI Agent Dana Lewis (Marcia Gay Harden) tells them that the Manhattan case could be connected to several unsolved cases across the country, she returns to New York to partner with SVU to get a confession. When Benson and Amaro begin to have doubts about the legitimacy of the confession, a shocking secret threatens the life of Agent Lewis.: Episode inspired by the Murder of Sherri Rasmussen by Stephanie Lazarus.
310	15	"Deadly Ambition"	Jim McKay	Story by : Peter Blauner & Kevin Fox; Teleplay by : Warren Leight & Julie Martin	February 20, 2013	1415	5.61
Rollins comes home to find her sister (Lindsay Pulsipher) back in New York, beaten and pregnant by her boyfriend (Theis Weckesser). When the boyfriend comes to the apartment unexpectedly, Rollins must take drastic action, which opens an investigation led by IAB Lt. Ed Tucker (Robert John Burke), that soon places Rollins' job in jeopardy.: Special appearance by Carolyn McCormick as Dr. Elizabeth Olivet
311	16	"Funny Valentine"	Jean de Segonzac	Gwendolyn Parker	February 27, 2013	1416	5.44
When promising singer Micha Green (Tiffany Robinson) is attacked by her hip-hop star boyfriend (Roca), the detectives and Barba work to build a case. Despite Benson's efforts, Green refuses to aid in the prosecution and continues to put herself in harm's way. As the case spirals into a media frenzy, Micha and those close to her pay the ultimate price.: Inspired by the Rihanna and Chris Brown domestic case.
312	17	"Undercover Blue"	Michael Smith	Ed Zuckerman & Aaron Tracy	March 20, 2013	1417	5.51
As the trial against pimp Bart Ganzel is set to begin, Detective Cassidy is accused of raping a woman while he was undercover. ADA Derek Strauss (Greg Germann) takes the case and pushes hard for a quick win. Cassidy's lawyer uses unusual tactics to prove Cassidy's innocence, which brings to light a revelation that surprises Amaro.
313	18	"Legitimate Rape"	Jonathan Herron	Kevin Fox & Peter Blauner	March 27, 2013	1418	6.61
A sports reporter (Lauren Cohan) seeks Benson's help to accuse a cameraman (David Marciano) of rape, but only agrees to press charges after she discovers the man is stalking her. But before the trial begins, she learns she is pregnant and Barba must contend with controversial defense tactics as a result.
314	19	"Born Psychopath"	Alex Chapple	Julie Martin & Warren Leight	April 3, 2013	1419	6.34
When the detectives are called in to investigate suspicious injuries on a young girl, a closer look at her family reveals a mother (Hope Davis) struggling to control her violent 10-year-old son (Ethan Cutkosky). With help from the visiting Dr. Huang (BD Wong), the SVU squad tries to determine the appropriate treatment for the boy, but the situation turns increasingly dangerous for both the family and the detectives.
315	20	"Girl Dishonored"	Holly Dale	Story by : Warren Leight & Julie Martin; Teleplay by : Robert Brooks Cohen	April 24, 2013	1420	7.35
When the SVU investigates a rape allegation of a sorority pledge (Colby Minifie) on a college campus, their attempts at piecing together the crime are hindered by fraternity brothers and campus security. A deeper look uncovers more assault victims and school administrators who were willing to look the other way. When more tragedy strikes, Rollins and Barba become determined to put an end to the widespread university culture of protecting their own.
316	21	"Traumatic Wound"	Alex Zakrzewski	Gwendolyn Parker & John P. Roche	May 1, 2013	1421	5.72
A teenage girl (Lola Kirke) is brutally assaulted when a concert turns into a mob scene. After getting mixed accounts of the incident, Amaro zeros in on a security guard, Frank Patterson (Eion Bailey), who is a war veteran seemingly suffering from PTSD. When the case goes to trial, Frank suddenly remembers a key piece of testimony, which helps Barba convict the perpetrators.
317	22	"Poisoned Motive"	Arthur W. Forney	Story by : Warren Leight; Teleplay by : Julie Martin & Ed Zuckerman	May 8, 2013	1422	6.91
When two surprise sniper attacks on the NYPD leave the SVU scrambling for answers, Tutuola recognizes a link between the shootings and his past cases as a narcotics detective. After reconnecting with his former partner to search for a motive, more violence occurs, prompting assistance from Lieutenant Eames (Kathryn Erbe) to track down the killer.
318	23	"Brief Interlude"	Kevin Bray	Story by : Peter Blauner, Kevin Fox, & Pedro Garcia; Teleplay by : Peter Blauner & Kevin Fox	May 15, 2013	1423	6.48
Benson and Amaro are called in when an unconscious woman (Kerry Butler) with physical trauma is found near the Mayor's home. With the woman in a coma, the detectives must piece together her identity and prior whereabouts, and they uncover a wild side to this seemingly normal wife and mother of two young boys.
319	24	"Her Negotiation"	Norberto Barba	Julie Martin & Warren Leight	May 22, 2013	1424	6.66
After making a seemingly routine arrest of a man exposing himself in Central Park, Rollins has a bad feeling about the suspect (Pablo Schreiber) and calls upon the entire squad to help. With no way of immediately identifying the man, he outplays the detectives at every turn and becomes wanted for a heinous crime. A shocking theory comes to light and Barba is unable to get his conviction, which puts Benson in harm's way.

== Ratings ==
Law & Order: Special Victims Unit was moved back to NBC Wednesdays at 9:00PM (Eastern)/8:00PM (Central) for the 2012–13 network television season, its lead-ins being new comedies, Guys with Kids and Animal Practice (which was canceled by NBC on October 18, 2012, Whitney replacing it in November). SVU weekly airs up against the American Broadcasting Company (ABC) comedies Modern Family and Suburgatory with FOX's The X Factor and in the Winter, American Idol, Supernatural on the CW, and CBS's veteran drama Criminal Minds (this occurring for the third time SVU has been pushed back to 9:00PM (Eastern).

Season fourteen premiered (episodes: "Lost Reputation & Above Suspicion") fairly well earning approximately 7.19 million total viewers with a 2.1 in the age 18-49 demographic with a 6% share. The series' 300th episode ("Manhattan Vigil") was watched by approximately 6.77 million total viewers and earned a 1.9 in the age 18-49 demographic with a 5% share. Leading into Thanksgiving, SVU saw a sharp decline in the 18-49 demographic with the episode "Lesson's Learned", which earned a 1.3 with a 4% share, it rebounded to 1.6 in the 18-49 age demo with a 4% share with its fall finale episode, "Dreams Deferred"; in the first half-hour the comedy Modern Family on ABC was a repeat. SVU surged at the start of 2013 with the episode "Presumed Guilty", to 7.73 million total viewers and a 2.2 in the age 18-49 demo with a 6% share, coming in first place in its time slot; NBC and FOX being the only networks that night airing original episodes; ABC, CBS, and CW aired repeats. The following week, "Beautiful Frame" saw a series high in overall viewership in over a year with 8.42 million total viewers.

As of December 6, 2012, SVU averaged a 1.7 18-49 rating in Live+same day that Fall, airing with virtually no lead-in (NBC's struggling Wednesday comedy block), SVU had improved its challenging Wednesday 9 PM slot by 55% in adults 18-49 year-to-year but the network aired the now-defunct Harry's Law in the hour last fall. In Live+7, SVU averaged a 2.6/7 in 18-49 and 8.6 million viewers this season up to that point.

No.	Title	Original air date	Timeslot Rank	Age 18-49 (Rating/Share)	U.S. Viewers (millions)
1	"Lost Reputation"	September 26, 2012	3rd	2.1/6%	7.19
2	"Above Suspicion"	September 26, 2012	2nd	2.1/6%	7.19
3	"Twenty-Five Acts"	October 10, 2012	3rd	1.8/5%	6.24
4	"Acceptable Loss"	October 17, 2012	4th	1.6/4%	6.25
5	"Manhattan Vigil"	October 24, 2012	4th	1.9/5%	6.77
6	"Friending Emily"	October 31, 2012	4th	1.7/5%	6.05
7	"Vanity's Bonfire"	November 14, 2012	4th	1.7/4%	5.78
8	"Lessons Learned"	November 21, 2012	4th	1.3/4%	5.20
9	"Dreams Deferred"	December 5, 2012	4th	1.6/4%	6.16
10	"Presumed Guilty"	January 2, 2013	1st	2.2/6%	7.73
11	"Beautiful Frame"	January 9, 2013	3rd	2.1/5%	8.42
12	"Criminal Hatred"	January 30, 2013	2nd	1.7/4%	6.42
13	"Monster's Legacy"	February 6, 2013	4th	1.5/4%	5.23
14	"Secrets Exhumed"	February 13, 2013	4th	1.5/4%	6.35
15	"Deadly Ambition"	February 20, 2013	4th	1.6/4%	5.61
16	"Funny Valentine"	February 27, 2013	4th	1.6/4%	5.44
17	"Undercover Blue"	March 20, 2013	4th	1.6/4%	5.51
18	"Legitimate Rape"	March 27, 2013	3rd	1.7/5%	6.61
19	"Born Psychopath"	April 3, 2013	4th	1.6/4%	6.34
20	"Girl Dishonored"	April 24, 2013	2nd	1.9/5%	7.35
21	"Traumatic Wound"	May 1, 2013	4th	1.5/4%	5.72
22	"Poisoned Motive"	May 8, 2013	4th	1.9/5%	6.91
23	"Brief Interlude"	May 15, 2013	4th	1.5/4%	6.48
24	"Her Negotiation"	May 22, 2013	4th	1.7/5%	6.66
