= Rhodium Nights =

- Law & Order: Special Victims Unit episode
- Captain Cragen (Dann Florek) after waking up and discovering the dead body of an escort (portrayed by Pippa Black) in bed with him
- Episode no.: Season 13; Episode 23
- Directed by: Norberto Barba
- Written by: Warren Leight; Julie Martin
- Production code: 13023
- Original air date: May 23, 2012

Guest appearances
- Peter Jacobson as Bart Ganzel; Brooke Smith as Delia Wilson; Pippa Black as Carissa Gibson; Eric Ladin as Clayton Hannigan; Ron Rifkin as Defense Attorney Marvin Exley; Reg E. Cathey as Defense Attorney Barry Cuerns; Tabitha Holbert as ADA Rose Caliay; Laura Benanti as Maria Amaro; Tamara Tunie as Dr. Melinda Warner; Dean Winters as Detective Brian Cassidy

Episode chronology
← Previous "Strange Beauty"	Next → "Lost Reputation"
- Law & Order: Special Victims Unit (season 13)

"Rhodium Nights" is the thirteenth season finale of the police procedural television series Law & Order: Special Victims Unit and the 295th overall episode. It originally aired on NBC in the United States on May 23, 2012. In the episode, a high-society bachelor party ends when an escort is found dead, and the Special Victims Unit must proceed with caution as influential people try to bury the truth, which may destroy the life of one of the detectives. Meanwhile, Captain Don Cragen (Dann Florek) is blackmailed, and later he awakens in the middle of the night to find blood on his hands and a sex worker's (portrayed by Pippa Black) dead body in his bed, her throat slit.

The episode was written by showrunner/executive producer Warren Leight and Julie Martin and was directed by Norberto Barba. The episode featured a guest appearance from Dean Winters, who reprises his role as Detective Brian Cassidy for the first time since the episode "Disrobed".

"Rhodium Nights" received fairly positive reviews from critics, with critics commenting mostly on the cliffhanger ending. According to the Nielsen ratings, the episode's original broadcast was watched by 7.16 million total viewers and received a 2.0/5% share in the 18–49 age demographic, making it the most watched program on NBC of the night.

== Plot ==
During a bachelor's party at a penthouse, Clayton Hannigan (Eric Ladin) and an escort, Carissa Gibson (Pippa Black) find a dead pretty girl in a bedroom. Detectives Benson and Amaro (Mariska Hargitay and Danny Pino) respond and find the body in a swimming pool. A police officer explains that party-goers claim they found her floating in the pool and do not know her.

Hannigan tells Benson and Amaro that he was trying to save the unknown victim. Detectives Fin Tutuola and Rollins (Ice-T and Kelli Giddish) learn that one of the partygoers is groom-to-be Will Brady and the police commissioner's son. He tells Benson he does not know the dead girl.

Dr. Warner (Tamara Tunie) tells Fin and Rollins the victim had a lethal amount of sedatives in her blood, suggesting she was drugged, and semen in her vaginal cavity. Through her breast implants, SVU identifies her as Maggie Murphy (Meg McCrossen), a 16-year-old girl from Winnipeg who ran away from home six months ago. Will shows up with his lawyer (Sam McMurray) and presents Benson and Cragen with a video taken the night of the party that proves his innocence. The video, however, shows Hannigan and Gibson entering the same room Maggie did before she died.

Hannigan confesses to putting Maggie's body in the pool, reasoning a drowning would create less suspicion, but still says he does not know her. Carissa and her lawyer (Reg E. Cathey) arrive and the former tells Benson and Amaro that she works for an escort service and knew all of the girls at the party except Maggie. The detectives decide to talk to Carissa's booker, Bart Ganzel (Peter Jacobson).

When Rollins and Amaro arrive at Ganzel's residence, they discover an escort party and that Detective Brian Cassidy (Dean Winters), formerly of the SVU, is now working as Bart's bodyguard. After a fight, Cassidy and Ganzel are arrested. Cassidy says he has been working undercover for the past three years. Rollins and Fin question Ganzel, who says Maggie does not work for him and that the only escort he has not heard from is Anya, who flew home to Colombia the day after the murder.

The detectives search Anya's apartment and find an empty pill bottle that matches the drug Maggie was poisoned with. Cassidy tells Benson that Anya used to work for another escort booker, Delia Wilson (Brooke Smith), who is Ganzel's main competitor. Benson and Amaro visit Delia at her farm to question her about her escort service; Delia describes it as a "match-making service" and says she does not know Ganzel personally. Cragen urges Benson to back off of the case, because he is being blackmailed with photos taken from his undercover stint in the episode "Russian Brides."

Later, a former governor who was at the bachelor's party is found dead in his home. The detectives learn that he was with one of Delia's escorts and at his autopsy, Warner discovers the same drug in him she found in Maggie's body. Fin and Rollins interrogate the escort assigned to the governor. She says he was dead when she arrived and called her booker, Iris, who told her to leave the home immediately. The detectives call in Iris, who too denies knowing anything about drugs in the governor's body. Iris then tells Benson and Amaro everything: that Delia is a notorious madam waging a war against Bart Ganzel. She claims that Delia sent Maggie to Hannigan's party and had another escort drug her to destroy Bart's business. The detectives head back to Delia's farm and arrest her.

Delia's lawyer Exley (Ron Rifkin) pays her $2 million bail, then warns the detectives that Delia has influence over extremely powerful people and they should leave her alone. That evening, as Amaro is leaving the station, Carissa tells him she is afraid for her life. Amaro wants to take her into the station house, but Carissa insists she has to leave. At home, Cragen wakes up in the middle of the night, confused, to find Carissa in his bed with her throat slit.

== Production ==
"Rhodium Nights" was written by executive producer/show runner Warren Leight with Julie Martin and directed by Norberto Barba. On April 25, 2012, Warren Leight noted on his Twitter profile that he had just finished the first draft of the season finale. "Thanks to everyone at SVU for all your hard work. Thanks to all tweeps/fans for your support." Dean Winters returns to the show in this episode as Detective Brian Cassidy, who was last seen in the first season episode, "Disrobed", where he felt he should transfer to a narcotics unit of the NYPD. On May 16, 2012, Ice-T said on his Twitter profile that filming on the episode had finished: "Just shot the last scene of the 13th SVU season.. See y'all for season 14. #SVU Season Wrapped!"

Being interviewed by Zap2It at the NBC 2012-13 upfronts, Danny Pino noted, "There is a huge cliffhanger at the end, so it's worth sticking around to the end." Ice-T added, "Some people end up in harm's way, I mean the show is really about us going up against pretty much an organized crime family, well not really a crime family but some criminals who have their hooks pretty deep in the system. They got their hooks in the politicians, and really we're pushing against people who can push back, and it turns out to be a little hazardous for us." And Dann Florek joked, "I think it's the biggest cliffhanger we've ever had in the show; stuff is flying, you know what I'm saying, stuff hits the fan. [...], there are deaths. Generally there's some deaths, there's some blood, you know what, I'm going to tell you the honest truth, I'm not one-hundred percent sure everyone walks away or not, it's exciting you know."

Dann Florek noted to TV Guide; "It looks like he could be a little shady, and it's up to Cragen to say, 'I know Brian and he's a good cop,'"; Detective Brian Cassidy (Dean Winters), is now an undercover cop who is involved in the team's latest case. Unfortunately, Detective Amaro (Danny Pino) doesn't quite believe him. "It's contentious with Amaro," Pino says. "Dean's character is not as affable as Amaro would like."

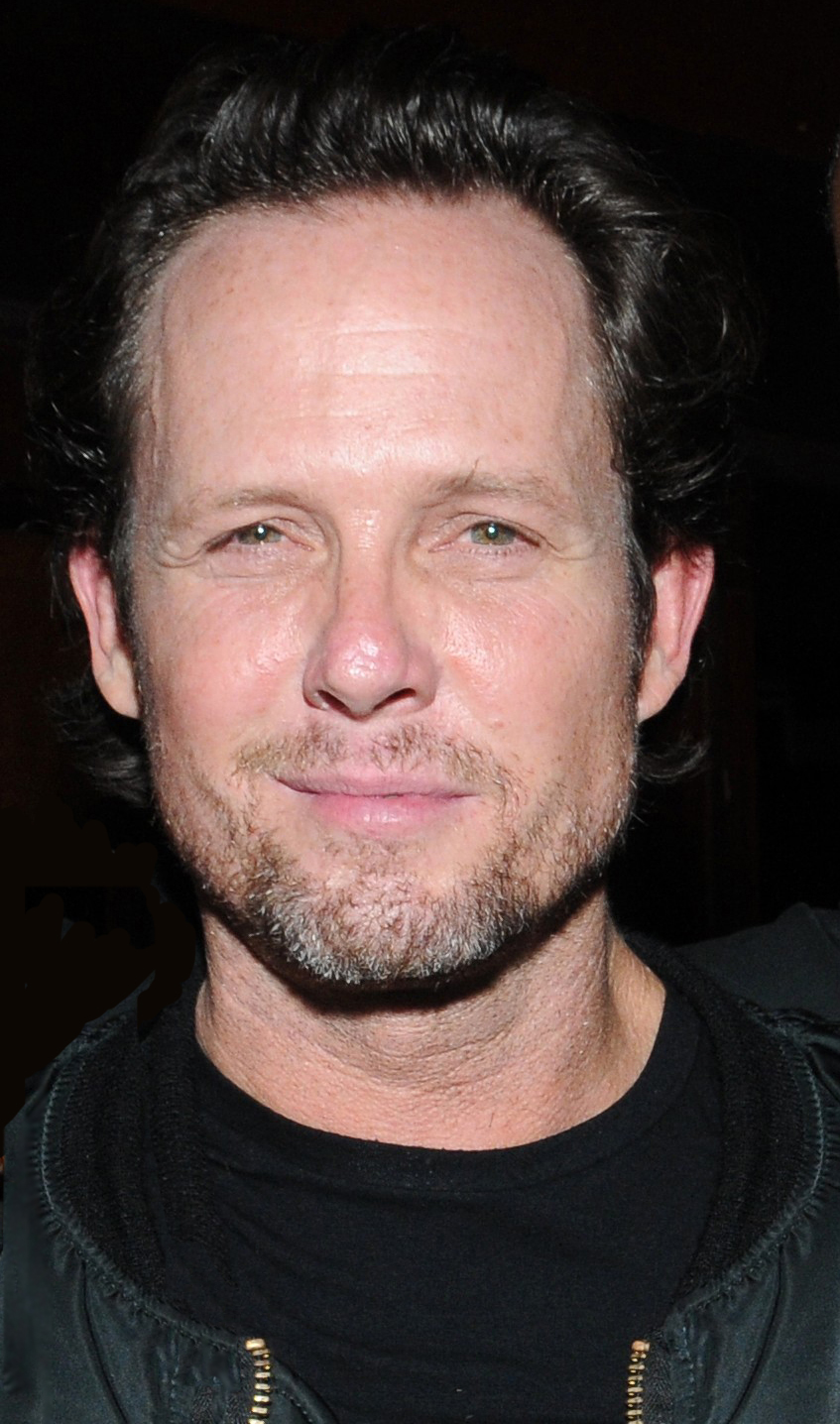
Dean Winters portrayed Detective Brian Cassidy throughout the first season of SVU. His character goes undercover again in this episode.

In "Rhodium Nights", one part of Pino’s Detective Amaro's personal life — a shaky marriage to Laura Benanti's Maria — will be touched on. "There’s a scene that may or may not illuminate where their future is headed," Pino hinted to TVLine. He also noted about the cliffhanger, "It doesn’t end well [for certain characters], let’s put it that way. In fact, it’s such a cliffhanger, if I say anything more, I’m going to give it up!" Kelli Giddish said of the episode, "It’s a great cliffhanger, one that really mirrors a lot of stuff that’s been going on in front-page news." Ice-T added, "A lot of people end up in harm’s way." And having been down this annual road before with SVU, he reminds, "You don’t want to go into the finale bleeding or shot, because that is not good. It’s hard for [contract] negotiations, too!"

In an interview with Yahoo TV, show runner/executive producer Warren Leight noted, "This episode is a real potboiler that involves a lot of politics, and in politics, you never know who to trust." With a smirk, Leight continued, "I know viewers hear this about shows a lot, but I'm very serious when I say, do not turn off the last five minutes of this episode." Bringing on Cassidy falls right into Leight's vision for the show throughout the 13th season, "A lot of what I was trying to do this year was pick up the interesting threads that have been left over the years. We brought Olivia's brother back in "Child's Welfare" and Fin's son showed up in "Learning Curve"." With the recent renewal of the show, Leight says there will be adjustments for next season, although he's not sure what those are as yet. He did mention that at some point during the show's 14th season the show will hit episode number 300, certainly a major milestone. "I think we really have to do something for that," he offers. "I'm not sure what it is, but I'd like to figure out something special to do."

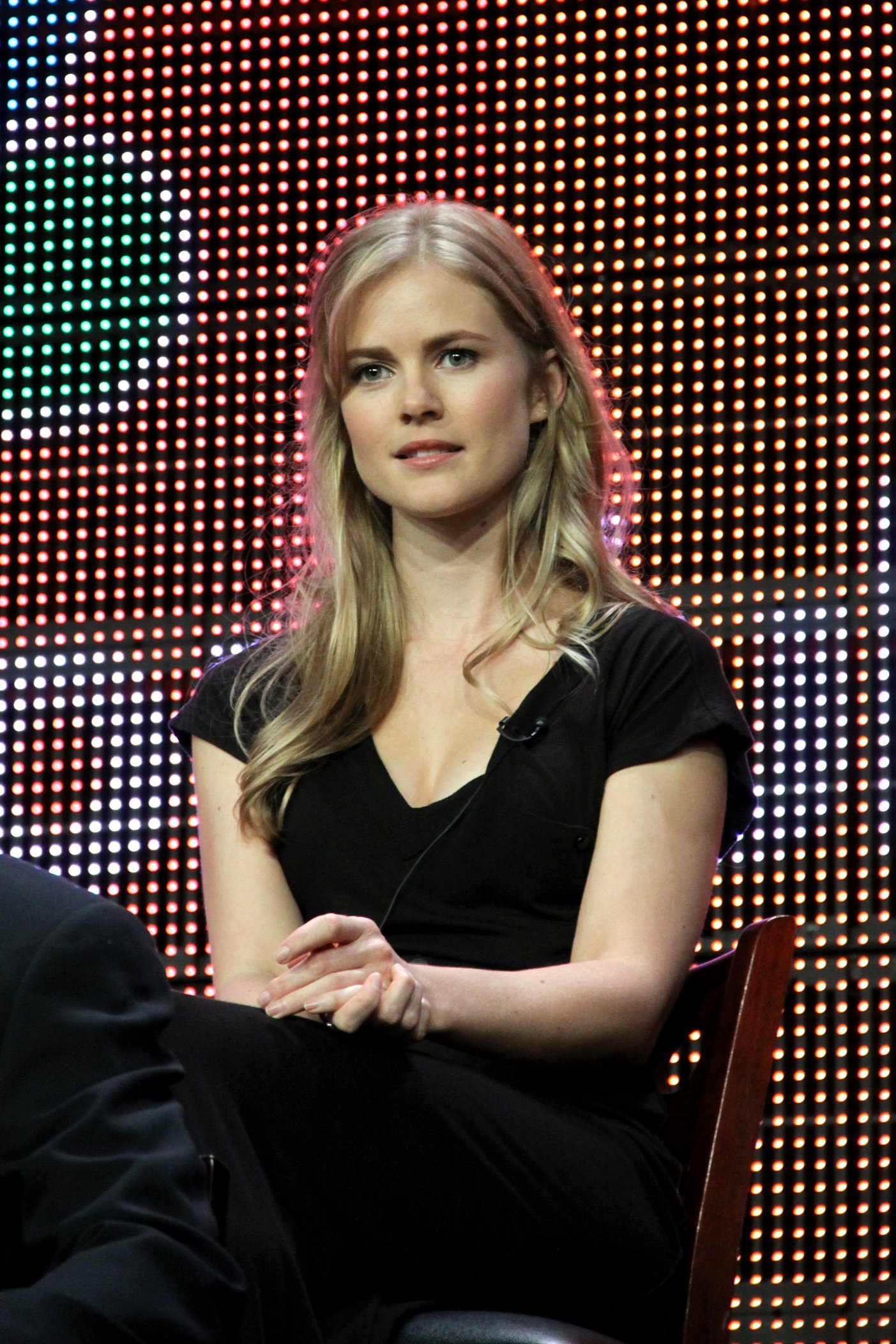
Pippa Black's (pictured) character is killed after she figures that someone is after her. Her body is found in Captain Cragen's (Dann Florek's) bed, with her throat slit.

Pippa Black who portrayed Carissa Gibson said of the episode to the Australian News.com, "Playing this character was something new for me," Black says. "Any role you do, you go outside of yourself, but you don't want to stretch it so far that it's unbelievable to you. Carissa is someone who felt no man would say no to her. I loved doing the role. And working with Danny Pino (Nick Amaro)... he's a very handsome man, isn't he?" Black added with a laugh. Black said to Yahoo Australia, "I thought, 'Oh my god, I'm going to have to be naked and on a stripper pole,' but my manager said it was a really great role and that I should have a look," she explained. "So I was sitting there trying to scroll through the episode (script), and my god it was such a page turner. I loved the character, it was such a strong story of who-done-it."

Just two days after agreeing to take on the part, Black flew to New York to begin filming. "I love New York," she said. "Spending two weeks there was great. We were filming New York stories on New York streets, so it felt very real." She continued, "I guess the thing that sticks out to me is that last scene where I'm with (detective) Nick, it was the first time he sees her scared, when she's around him she's always seductive or very in control of herself but at this point she's almost helpless."

"Rhodium Nights" was partially inspired by a woman who claimed to be raped by New York City FOX 5 news reporter, Greg Kelly, who is the son of the actual NYPD Police Commissioner Raymond Kelly. Kelly was accused by this woman who said Kelly took advantage of her after she had too much to drink. The case was handed to the district attorney's office, which later decided not to charge Kelly, based on insufficient evidence that a rape had occurred.

Warren Leight has confirmed that the guest stars from "Rhodium Nights" will return for the 14th season's premiere episode, which will possibly be a two-parter itself, and it will pick up where the finale left off. "In fact, there were a number of scenes we shot that didn't make it into this cut that may make it into the next one. ... It's good to know who did it and why, and who's pulling the strings. I don't think we have every beat plotted out, and we may even do a two-parter to open the season. That's still in discussion. We have booked many of the actors so they're available when we begin shooting again in July. So just on that basis, we had to know who was complicit, because we had to know who was coming back." Leight said to Zap2It.

After filming for season 14 started, Warren Leight said to Today that while they were filming the season finale, NBC hadn't yet renewed SVU for a 14th season. Leight admitted that having a cliffhanger was a bit of a wink at NBC: "I thought, let's make it as difficult for the network as possible," he chuckled. "I don't think that swayed them one way or the other."

== Reception ==
=== Ratings ===
In its original American broadcast on May 23, 2012, "Rhodium Nights" was viewed by 7.16 million viewers and acquired a 2.0 rating/5% share in the age 18–49 demographic. "Rhodium Nights" was the most watched program on NBC that night, beating both the season finale episode and an encore episode of Betty White's Off Their Rockers as well as a repeat of Law & Order: Special Victims Unit, which preceded this episode's broadcast. It was the second-most watched program in its time slot, behind ABC's Revenge but ahead of a repeat episode of CBS's Criminal Minds.

=== Critical response ===
Kristen Elizabeth of TV Equals said of the season finale, "Wow. After a somewhat lackluster season, Law & Order: SVU came to life in "Rhodium Nights," their season finale, and gave us one crazy cliff-hanger. I certainly didn’t see it coming, but I will back in the fall to see what happens, so score one for SVU!" Teresa L. of TV Fanatic ranked the episode a 5.0/5.0 and noted, "The cliffhanger really renewed my interest in catching the next season."

Valerie Milano of Hollywood Today felt differently about the episode and left a mixed-to-negative review: "Without revealing any spoilers, I can tell you that this show maximized uncomfortable tension within the team surrounding the sensitive nature of the investigation and what they could and could not focus on. Further, there were some familiar faces, including a former cast member from several years ago. This episode gets messy and involved. It does not, however, get resolved. It doesn’t even partially resolve. It merely sets up the next season and then offers a nasty cliffhanger. The whole thing strikes me as a cheap way to get people to come back and watch. I’ve been a fan of the show for the several years and I’m sorry to say that I am disappointed. This is the first season without Detective Stabler, and frankly, the show suffers because of it. The chemistry and tension between characters just doesn’t hit the same mark. The show seems to need more and more outrageous situations because it lacks the underlying charm, friction, and character dichotomy of the main characters. Even Tutuola and Munch seem to have lost something. All in all, the show is not what it once was."

Milano continued with, "That being said, it’s still more solid than a number of shows out there. While attempting to look at the show through new eyes, it’s still watchable; it just isn’t as enjoyable as it used to be. There’s still lots of drama and horror at the depravity the human race can sink to. However, I do believe that this next season will be the last unless they can get back some of the magic that they have lost."

Former sex crimes prosecutor Allison Leotta positively reviewed the episode saying, "The SVU finale “Rhodium Nights” ended Season 13 with a bang. This was a fast-paced, fun episode (to the extent anything involving two murdered escorts can be “fun”), based on a couple of interesting real-life cases." And she also said, "I can’t believe we have to wait until Season 14 to find out what happens with Cragen." But she gave the episode an "A−".
