= Brian Cassidy =

Fictional character on Law & Order: Special Victims Unit

- Law & Order character
- First appearance: "Payback" (season 1)
- Last appearance: "In the Wind" (season 27)
- Portrayed by: Dean Winters

In-universe information
- Title(s): NYPD Detective; Police Officer (Season 15); DA Investigator (Season 19)
- Partner: John Munch
- Seasons: 1, 13, 14, 15, 19, 20, 27

Detective Brian Cassidy is a fictional character played by Dean Winters in the American crime drama television series Law & Order: Special Victims Unit on NBC. A recurring cast member during the first season, Cassidy is a young and inexperienced detective with the New York Police Department's Special Victims Unit, and the original partner of John Munch (Richard Belzer).

The stress of the Special Victims Unit is too much for Cassidy, and he transfers to the Narcotics unit in the middle of the season. Cassidy later returns in the 13th-season finale working undercover for a pimp the SVU detectives are investigating.

Winters had previously worked with creator Dick Wolf, but he was offered a role on SVU through Belzer, though the role proved to be temporary due to Winters' commitment to Oz. As Winters only remained with the series for 13 episodes, his character never had much of a chance to develop. Winters wanted to return to the show for a long time, however, and felt the time was right during the 13th-season finale. Critics were generally negative about Cassidy during the character's initial tenure on the show, but some were glad to see his return in "Rhodium Nights".

== Character biography ==
Even though Brian Cassidy is a dedicated member of the Special Victims Unit, he lacks the language to describe sex crimes and the emotional maturity to deal with them. He views his partner, John Munch (Richard Belzer), as a mentor.

Cassidy has a drunken one-night stand with fellow SVU Detective Olivia Benson (Mariska Hargitay) but wants to pursue a relationship with her. She turns him down, citing a policy of not having relationships with co-workers. Years later, Benson expresses regret at the way she handled the situation.

These factors and the stress of the unit wear Cassidy down. After Cassidy loses his temper at Benson in front of the squad, Captain Donald Cragen (Dann Florek) tests his readiness to deal with sex crimes by sending him to check up on a teenage rape survivor Cragen met when he worked in homicide. After she details how her abuser systematically violated her and then had her gang-raped, Cassidy decides he lacks the stomach to deal with sex crimes and transfers to the NYPD's Narcotics Division. Munch later laments that he felt abandoned when Cassidy became the latest in a long line of partners who left him.

Besides a brief appearance whilst undercover as a bartender in Season 9 episode "Authority", Cassidy makes a proper return 12 years later in the Season 13 episode "Rhodium Nights". He has been working undercover for three years as a bodyguard for a pimp, Bart Ganzel (Peter Jacobson), and gives the SVU detectives information about Ganzel's prostitution ring. When a prostitute who had been dating both Cassidy and Ganzel is found dead in bed with Cragen, Detective Nick Amaro (Danny Pino) believes Cassidy played a role in framing Cragen, despite the other SVU detectives vouching for him. Amaro confronts Cassidy at gunpoint and tries to force information out of him. After Ganzel discovers Cassidy is working undercover to expose him, he has a corrupt NYPD police officer shoot Cassidy. Amaro helps uncover the conspiracy that led to the attack. Cassidy survives and awakens in the hospital, where Benson tells him she is not the same person she was when they first worked together, and kisses him.

In the episode "Undercover Blue", a prostitute accuses Cassidy of raping her while he was undercover four years prior. Investigation reveals the woman and her boss set Cassidy up to make money from suing the NYPD, and the charges are dropped. Because of the longtime consensual relationship Cassidy had had with a prostitute during his undercover stint, however, he is demoted from detective to officer, working nights at a Bronx courthouse. Benson's and Cassidy's relationship, until now a secret to SVU, is also forced into the open in this episode when Amaro and Munch go to Cassidy's apartment and find Benson there; in Season 15, the couple moves in together.

In the episode "Internal Affairs", Internal Affairs Bureau Lt. Ed Tucker (Robert John Burke) puts Cassidy undercover to investigate a corrupt precinct with the promise that, if the operation is successful, he will earn back his detective badge. Although the assignment very nearly leads to his death at the hands of two corrupt cops, it is revealed in the episode "Rapist Anonymous" that Cassidy is a detective again and will be working in Internal Affairs. Cassidy and Benson amicably break up during the episode "Downloaded Child" after realizing they are fundamentally different people; he prefers to live in the moment, while she plans for the future.

At the end of Season 19's "Gone Fishin'", Cassidy returns as a DA investigator and tells Benson he is investigating allegations that she is abusing her adopted son, Noah. In "Mood", it is revealed that Cassidy told another DA investigator about Benson and her ordeal with serial rapist William Lewis (Pablo Schreiber), which indirectly led to the child abuse claim. Benson, furious, says she never wants to speak to him again.

In "Chasing Demons", Cassidy testifies against a child molester he had physically assaulted during arrest. During cross-examination, Cassidy explodes with anger and threatens to kill the defendant, causing a mistrial. The suspect is murdered the following day after Cassidy is seen at his house, and ADA Peter Stone (Philip Winchester) has him arrested for murder. The killer, though, turns out to have been one of the suspect's victims, and Cassidy is exonerated. However, Cassidy opens up to Stone, telling him that he was molested as a child by his Little League coach, something he never told Benson, and that one reason he left the unit was his inability to handle the recurring memories of his abuse. Cassidy later apologizes to Benson for unintentionally jeopardizing her custody of Noah, and reconciles with her.

In "Facing Demons", the suicide of a 22-year-old man leads SVU to Gary Dolan (William Sadler), who molested the victim years before. While searching Dolan's apartment, Benson recognizes Cassidy as a boy in one of Dolan's photographs of the many Little League teams he coached. Benson reaches out to Cassidy to see if he has information about Dolan. Cassidy claims to know nothing, but after the visit, Benson gives an update on the case to Stone, who realizes Dolan must be Cassidy's abuser. Stone wants him to testify against Dolan, but he refuses, partly to avoid facing the memories of his abuse and partly to keep Benson from finding out about it. He does help Stone recruit another of Dolan's victims to testify, but the man's testimony is stricken from the record when he admits to drinking alcohol before testifying. Realizing Dolan will go free without any other survivors ready to testify against him, Cassidy, with Benson's encouragement and support, decides to tell the court what Dolan did to him.

== Development ==
"It's amazing. I've wanted to come back for a long time but scheduling difficulties never really permitted it, so, with this storyline, with the [season 13] finale and now what we're doing with the two-hour [season 14] opening movie, it feels like this was the right time to come, so I'm glad I waited."

— Dean Winters,

Although Winters previously worked with Dick Wolf on New York Undercover, he credited fellow cast member Richard Belzer with getting him the job on Law & Order: Special Victims Unit. Belzer and Winters had first worked together when Winters guest-starred on Homicide: Life on the Street, where Belzer was a regular. Wolf invited Belzer to join the cast of his new Law & Order spinoff after Homicide was cancelled, and Belzer told Wolf he would only join the cast if Winters was his partner on the show. Winters had a role at the same time on the HBO drama Oz and, while the SVU role was initially only supposed to last a few episodes, he was contractually obligated to Oz, and eventually departed SVU completely to focus on Oz.

Winters believed that Cassidy was not unintelligent, but simply naive. He voiced early on a desire to executive producer Ted Kotcheff that Cassidy not be made into the "dumb blonde" of the unit because he did not believe there would be any in the Special Victims Unit. Cassidy's character did not see much development, but Winters attributed this to the lack of time the character was on the show. His character appeared during the first half of the first season, when the writers were trying to flesh out all of the characters on the show. Had he remained on the show longer, Winters believed that the writers would have found much more for Cassidy to do.

Winters was not bitter that the SVU role did not work out, and he wanted to return to the series for many years. During the 13th season, SVU was filming scenes in front of the building where Winters lived, so he chatted with the cast and crew, especially his former costar Mariska Hargitay. Hargitay helped Winters return to the show for the season finale that year. Winters saw potential in the storyline involving Cragen being framed for the murder of a prostitute and believed the time was right, so he agreed to stay on as a recurring character in the 14th season. Winters was excited about the changes in Cassidy's character; while Cassidy was young and immature in the first season, he had become more jaded in the years since, and Winters believed the audience was left in suspense in the 14th-season premiere not knowing whether Cassidy was corrupt or not.

== Awards and decorations ==
The following are the medals and service awards fictionally worn by Detective Cassidy, as seen in "Internal Affairs".

American Flag Breast Bar
NYPD Meritorious Police Duty

== Reception ==
After the premiere of SVU, Variety's Phil Gallo felt that Cassidy was not given much to do, and what he comes up with is an "irksome single note". Entertainment Weekly's Bruce Fretts agreed that the audience did not get to see enough of Cassidy.

Regarding Cassidy's return to the show, Brittany Frederick of Star Pulse said, "It was a pleasant surprise to see Dean Winters reprise his role as Detective Brian Cassidy last season; his character was with the show so briefly that we didn't really get to know him... Cassidy is an entirely different person now—as he should be after so many years absent—but there's an odd comfort in getting to see him again when the show could've easily come up with a random undercover cop to fill his role."
