= Nick Amaro =

Fictional character on Law & Order: Special Victims Unit

Nicolas Fiorello "Nick" Amaro Jr.
- Law & Order character
- First appearance: "Personal Fouls" (2011)
- Last appearance: "The Five Hundredth Episode" (2021)
- Portrayed by: Danny Pino

In-universe information
- Title: NYPD Senior Detective 2nd Grade
- Family: Cesaria Amaro (mother); Nicolas Fiorello Amaro Sr. (father); Sonya Amaro (sister); Zara Amaro (daughter); Maria Grazie Amaro (ex-wife); Cynthia Mancheno (ex-girlfriend); Gilberto Mancheno (son)
- Partner: Olivia Benson; Dominick Carisi Jr. Amanda Rollins
- Seasons: 13, 14, 15, 16, 23

Nicolas Fiorello Amaro Jr. is a fictional character on the NBC police procedural drama Law & Order: Special Victims Unit, portrayed by Danny Pino. Amaro was a detective with the Manhattan SVU at the 16th Precinct of the New York City Police Department and later a biophysics doctorate student.

== Background ==
Amaro is of Cuban and Italian descent. His father, Nicolas Amaro Sr. (Armand Assante), was abusive to both his mother and him, and later fled to Miami, Florida. Amaro attributes his firm belief in divorce to watching his mother, Cesaria (Nancy Ticotin), suffer through her marriage. Amaro testifies against his father when Nicolas is accused of beating his new fiancée, Gabriela (Katty Velasquez), but the elder Amaro is acquitted. After the trial, Amaro and his father make a tentative reconciliation.

Amaro is fluent in Spanish and has some knowledge of Latin. He is married at the start of his tenure with SVU, and has a young daughter named Zara (Alison Fernandez). His wife, Maria (Laura Benanti), is stationed overseas for a year, reporting in Iraq, and their marriage is strained by her deployment. In the Season 14 premiere, she reveals to Amaro that she is accepting a job in Washington, D.C., and following an argument, they separate.

Amaro questions if Maria is suffering from PTSD, and expresses his regret that he did not try harder to understand what she was going through. Maria offers to reconcile with Amaro if he moves to California with her and Zara. He ultimately refuses to do so, however.

It is implied throughout Amaro's tenure on the show that he is in a sexual relationship with his partner, Det. Amanda Rollins (Kelli Giddish). In the episode "Reasonable Doubt", he comes out of a shower in Rollins' apartment, implying that they had been intimate. In "Holden's Manifesto", a murder suspect asks them if they are sleeping together; they do not answer the question, and change the subject.

He also has a son with a former lover, Cynthia Mancheno (Andrea Navedo), named Gil (Jaden Matthew Rodriguez), whom he meets for the first time in the episode "Undercover Blue".

== Character within SVU ==
Amaro is an NYPD detective 2nd grade who transfers to the Special Victims Unit after spending time with both the warrants and narcotics squads. Like Fin Tutuola (Ice-T), he had previously worked undercover while in narcotics. Initially, Amaro has a strained relationship with his new partner, Detective Olivia Benson (Mariska Hargitay), mainly because she misses her old partner, Elliot Stabler (Christopher Meloni). Despite their rocky start, however, Amaro and Benson grow to have a mutual respect for each other and work well together. He has an antagonistic relationship with SVU's Assistant District Attorney Rafael Barba (Raúl Esparza); Amaro resents Barba, who is also Cuban-American and from a working-class family, for "selling out" by going to Harvard and distancing himself from his cultural roots. The two utilize their mutual fluency in Cuban Spanish to snipe at each other; however, this same shared background forms a solid foundation for the times they are on good terms.

During his early days in SVU, Amaro has a tough time dealing with the horrible crimes he sees every day, and during one case tells Benson he sometimes feels the urge to physically assault the rapists and child molesters they investigate. She tells him the better solution would be to ensure that the perpetrators never see the light of day again. In the episode "Hunting Ground", Amaro fatally shoots a serial killer who has Benson at gunpoint. It is the first time he has ever killed anyone, and he is badly shaken by the experience.

In the episode "Valentine's Day", he sees his wife go into an apartment of a man he does not know. In "Street Revenge", he follows his wife to see where she goes during the day; he then beats up the man he sees her with. She subsequently finds out, and they get into a heated argument in the SVU squad room in front of his colleagues. She tells him that the man he saw her with is a psychiatrist she is seeing because she is trying to adapt back into her old life.

Amaro is clearly rattled by this, and in subsequent episodes, begins suppressing his anger until it explodes during the investigation into madam Delia Wilson (Brooke Smith), when he threatens to shoot Detective Brian Cassidy (Dean Winters) if Cassidy does not tell him for whom he is working undercover. This, along with his erratic behavior, briefly alienates his SVU colleagues; for example, they are reluctant to give him sensitive information regarding the false charges against Captain Donald Cragen (Dann Florek), fearing that he will make matters worse.

In "Twenty-Five Acts", Amaro asks temporary SVU commanding officer Captain Steven Harris (Adam Baldwin) to let him work their rape case solo, telling Benson she needs a partner she can trust. Benson ends up working the case with Rollins.

In the episode "Undercover Blue", Cassidy is put on trial for rape when he is falsely accused by a prostitute working for pimp Bart Ganzel (Peter Jacobson). Amaro is called to the stand by ADA Derek Strauss (Greg Germann), who asks about his undercover work. When Cassidy's lawyer questions him, Amaro is forced to reveal that he had an affair with the sister of a drug lord he was investigating undercover. Sergeant John Munch (Richard Belzer) then informs him that the NYPD brass is requesting he take a paternity test because his ex-lover is claiming he has a son from the fling.

He goes to the woman's house to confront her, but is denied by her boyfriend. Later, while watching the boyfriend pick the boy up from school, he witnesses the man use the boy as a carrier during a drug deal. Amaro then meets the boy and tells the woman that her boyfriend is using their son to deal drugs. After Cassidy apologizes to Amaro for what his lawyer did, he helps him bust the boyfriend for drug dealing. The episode concludes with Amaro knocking on the woman's door, and her letting him in to bond with their son, Gil.

In "Born Psychopath", he is shot by Henry Mesner (Ethan Cutkosky), a psychopathic 10-year-old boy, while apprehending him for abusing his sister.

Amaro is arrested for assaulting pedophile Simon Wilkes (Joshua Malina), while off duty. He is then charged by the district attorney and placed on leave. The charges are subsequently dropped, but he is demoted and reassigned to the 116th Precinct in Queens as a patrol officer. At Benson's request, he is reinstated to SVU after his by-the-book handling of the arrest of Hollywood starlet Tensley Evans (Stevie Lynn Jones) for drunk and disorderly conduct, which indirectly helps the SVU team in their investigation of her rapist Adam Brubeck (Brian d'Arcy James).

In the Season 16 finale, Amaro plans to take the sergeant's exam and move up the ranks. However, Benson tells him that, because of his history of misconduct accusations, the NYPD will never promote him no matter how well he does; angered, Amaro throws his study materials in the garbage but he eventually gets over it. Shortly thereafter, Amaro is involved in a courtroom shootout with Johnny Drake (Charles Halford), a brutal sex trafficker and pimp. Amaro shoots Drake dead, while Drake shoots Amaro in the liver and knee.

Amaro survives the shootout and is seen in crutches at the end of the episode, requiring three months of physical therapy. He reveals to Benson that he intends to retire from the NYPD because of his inability to move up the ranks, in addition to his injuries. He plans to move to California, since Maria is now in Los Angeles with Zara, and Cynthia is planning to move to San Diego with Gil. Before Amaro leaves, Benson remarks on how much her life has changed over the years of working with him and they make a promise to each other to stay friends forever.

At the beginning of Season 17, Rollins mentions that Amaro is now living in Los Angeles, undergoing physical therapy for his injuries, and angling for a position with the United States Park Police. In the 500th episode, which aired during the 23rd season, Amaro is now a Genetics and Forensic Science graduate degree holder working for a company that specializes in analyzing cold-case DNA with new technologies, which bring him back to Manhattan in order to clear a man who was wrongfully convicted in a 1996 case which involved the sexual assault and fatal strangulation of a teenage girl.

== Awards and decorations ==
The following are the medals and service awards worn by Detective Amaro, as seen in "Girls Disappeared" and "Producer's Backend".

American Flag Breast Bar
NYPD Meritorious Police Duty
NYPD Excellent Police Duty

== Appearances and crossovers ==
- Chicago P.D. — episode: "They'll Have to Go Through Me" (2014)
- Chicago P.D. — episode: "The Number of Rats" (2015)

== Development ==
On June 27, 2011, NBC announced that Kelli Giddish and Danny Pino would be brought on as the new series regulars.
