= Pippa Black =

Australian actress (born 1982)

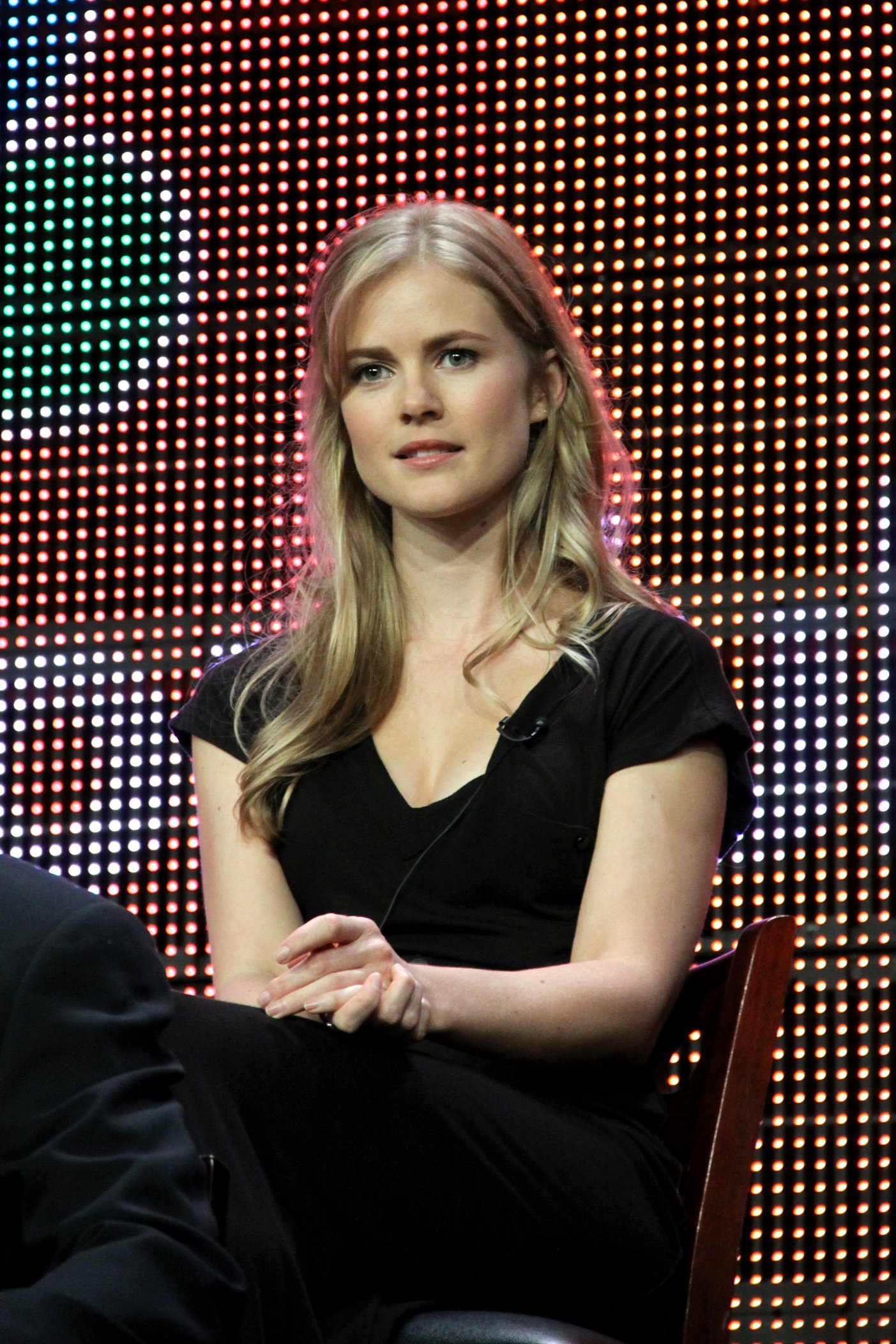
- Black at the Television Critics Association
- Born: 16 October 1982 (age 44); Melbourne, Victoria, Australia
- Education: St Patrick's Primary School, Pakenham; Beaconhills College
- Occupation: Actress
- Years active: 2002–present
- Known for: Neighbours (2005–2009); Outsourced (2010–2011)

Pippa Black (born 16 October 1982) is an Australian actress. From 2005 to 2009, Black played Elle Robinson in the Australian soap opera Neighbours and Tonya in the NBC series Outsourced from 2010 to 2011.

== Early life and education ==
Black was born in Melbourne. She attended St Patrick's Primary School in Pakenham, Victoria. She attended secondary school at Beaconhills College, where she was a vice captain. She studied to be a veterinarian, but ultimately deferred her Animal Technology studies to pursue an acting career.

== Career ==
Black appeared in the television movie Evil Never Dies, alongside Katherine Heigl in 2003. She then went on to make guest appearances in episodes of The Secret Life of Us and Last Man Standing.

In September 2005, it was announced that Black had joined the cast of Neighbours as Elle Robinson. Black told Clare Rigden of TV Week that she was going to London for a working holiday when she learnt that she had got the part. Of joining the cast, she commented "I admit I was a little star struck turning up to Ramsay Street and meeting everybody, but they all bent over backwards to help out and settle my nerves." Black earned a nomination for Most Popular New Female Talent at the Logie Awards for her portrayal of Elle. She was also nominated for Best Actress at Cosmopolitan's Fun, Fearless Female Awards in 2009. In June 2009, Black quit Neighbours to pursue other projects. The actress later revealed she would be willing to return to the soap in the future.

Black was cast in Gemma Lee's short film The Wake, which premiered at the Palm Springs International Festival of Short Films in 2009. She then went on to appear in the independent film Emergence and was cast in an episode of City Homicide as Emily Rigby. Black and her former Neighbours co-star Sweeney Young portrayed a young couple in the music video for Jacob Butler's single "Coma". Of appearing in the video, Black stated "I really love the track, that's why I got on board. I've never appeared in a video clip before so it's nice to be involved in something with really relatable lyrics. I think the scenes that we shot are really dramatic and quite emotive with the music."

On 6 July 2010, it was announced Black had been cast in US comedy Outsourced. She replaced Jessica Gower in the role of Tonya, "an athletic, statuesque woman who runs a customer service center in India." NBC cancelled Outsourced after one season. In 2012, Black appeared as Carissa Gibson in the season 13 finale of Law & Order: Special Victims Unit. She also filmed her first leading role in 2012 indie film My Funny Valentine. In 2014, she joined the cast of feature film Lemon Tree Passage as Amelia Stone and played Amanda in family TV film Cookie Mobster, before going on to appear in drama film Hypnotized the following year.

Black reprised her role of Elle Robinson in Neighbours for two guest appearances in September 2019 and July 2022.

== Personal life ==
Black is a vegetarian. She starred in an ad campaign for People for the Ethical Treatment of Animals (PETA) Asia Pacific in 2007. Black donned a gown made entirely of lettuce leaves. She said that "going vegetarian is a positive step to help stop animal suffering; it's also great for your health and the environment." Black has supported various charities including the Narre Warren Lighthouse Foundation and the Australian Childhood Foundation.

Black dated actor Fletcher Humphrys, who appeared alongside her as villain Guy Sykes on Neighbours. They had previously appeared together in drama series Last Man Standing. The pair split in 2007.

Black moved to Los Angeles in 2011 and shared an apartment with fellow Australian actor Tim Campbell.

== Filmography ==
=== Film ===
Year	Title	Role	Notes	Ref
2009	The Wake	Sophie	Short film	
2009	Emergence	Rachel	Short film	
2010	Tegan the Vegan	Elenore the Carnivore (voice)	Animated short film	
2012	Pineapples	Tina	Short film	
2012	My Funny Valentine	Zoe		
2013	Amnesia	Tina	Short film	
2013	Dream Girl	Eleanor	Short film	
2013	Lemon Tree Passage	Amelia Stone		
2015	Hypnotized	Jenny		
2015	Progress	Emelina Fox	Short film	

=== Television ===
Year	Title	Role	Notes	Ref
2003	Evil Never Dies	Female student	TV movie	
2004	The Secret Life of Us	Madelaine	Season 4, episode: "The Truth About Cats and Dogs: Part 1"	
2005	Last Man Standing	Chrissie	Episode: 1.4	
2005–2009, 2019, 2022	Neighbours	Elle Robinson	Main cast	
2010	City Homicide	Emilie Rigby	Season 3, episode: "Protection"	
2010–2011	Outsourced	Tonya	Regular role	
2012	Law & Order: Special Victims Unit	Carissa Gibson	2 episodes: "Rhodium Nights" & "Lost Reputation"	
2013	Royal Pains	Monique	Episode: "Bones to Pick"	
2013	Perception	Wendy / Candy	2 episodes	
2014	Cookie Mobster	Amanda	TV movie	
2016	The Manny	Pop	TV movie	

== Awards ==
Year	Work	Award	Category	Result	Ref
2006	Neighbours	Logie Awards	Most Popular New Female Talent	Nominated	
2009	Neighbours	Cosmopolitan's Fun, Fearless Female Awards	Best Actress	Nominated	
