= Dean Winters =

American actor (born 1964)

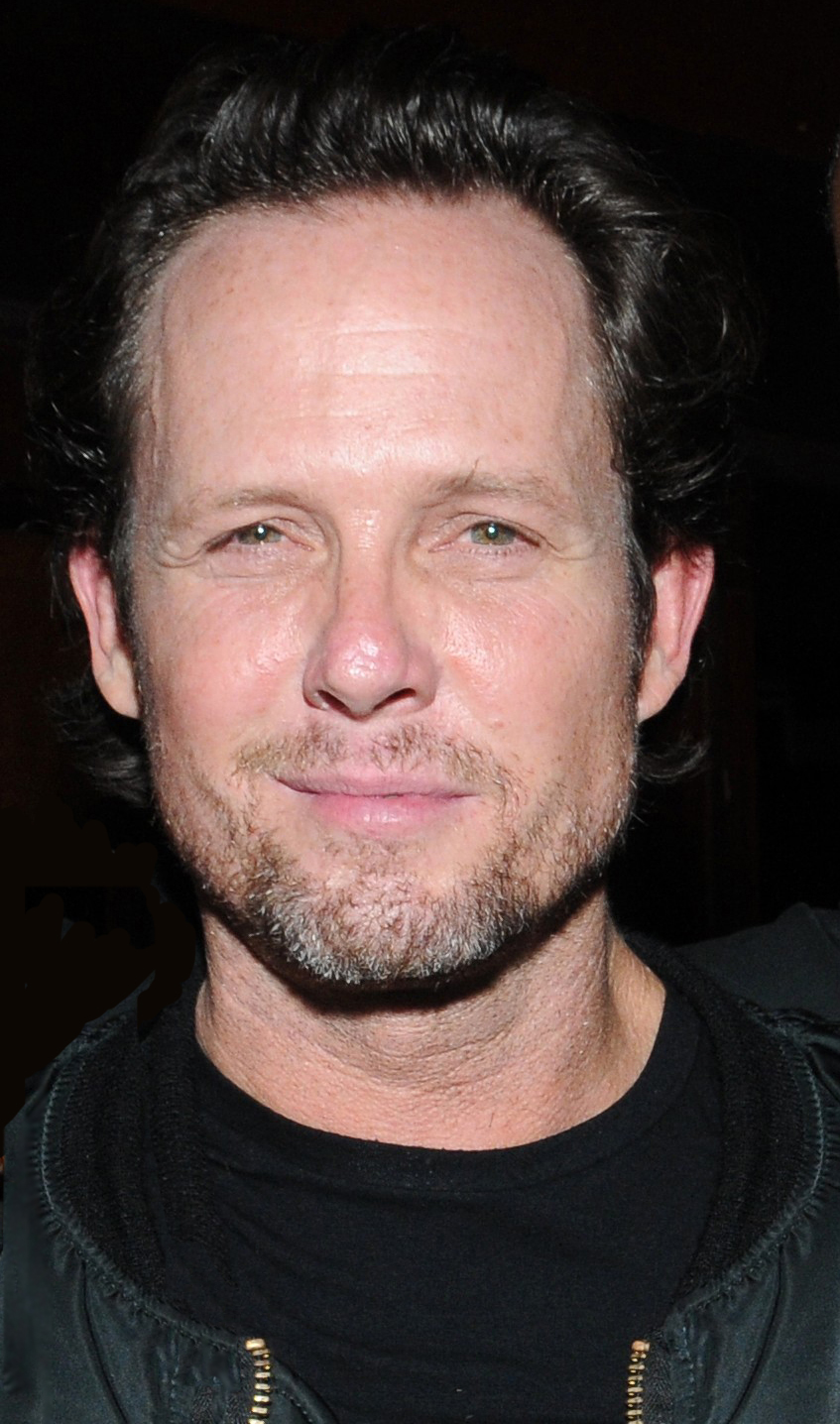
- Winters in 2010
- Born: Dean Gerard Winters; July 20, 1964 (age 62); New York City, U.S.
- Occupation: Actor
- Years active: 1995–present
- Relatives: Scott William Winters (brother)

Dean Gerard Winters (born July 20, 1964) is an American actor. He is known for his role as Ryan O'Reily on the HBO prison drama Oz and his roles in the TV series Millennium, Rescue Me, 30 Rock, Sex and the City, and Law & Order: Special Victims Unit, as well as portraying "Mayhem" in a series of Allstate Insurance commercials and starring in the 2014 film John Wick. He co-starred in one season of the CBS Network cop drama series Battle Creek and had a recurring role as "The Vulture" on the comedy series Brooklyn Nine-Nine. He also appeared in the 2023 Netflix film The Out-Laws and the 2024 AMC series Monsieur Spade.

== Early life and education ==
Winters was born in New York City on July 20, 1964. He was raised on Long Island. He is of Irish and Italian descent, and speaks fluent Italian. He has two brothers, actor Scott and writer Bradford, and a sister, Blair. Winters spent his teenage years in Scottsdale, Arizona. He attended Chaparral High School and graduated from Brophy College Preparatory, a Jesuit school in Phoenix, in 1982, and from Colorado College in 1986.

== Career ==
Winters' first credited on-camera appearance was on Homicide: Life on the Street. Winters had met creator Tom Fontana while working as a bartender, eventually agreeing to appear on a three-episode arc. Fontana subsequently wrote the part of Ryan O'Reily with Winters in mind for Oz, appearing on 56 episodes between 1997 and 2003. Following Oz's conclusion, Winters had a recurring role on Rescue Me, playing Johnny Gavin between 2004 to 2011.

Winters has appeared in two of the Law & Order television series: Law & Order: Special Victims Unit, where he was a regular in the first season, and as a guest star in the Law & Order: Criminal Intent episode "Purgatory". He also made an appearance in Season 2 of the television series Sex and the City as John McFadden. More than ten years after his final appearance on SVU, he again portrayed Detective Brian Cassidy in the 13th-season finale "Rhodium Nights", became a recurring character in the 14th season and, in the 15th season, and also became Captain Olivia Benson's love interest. He has also made guest appearances on Third Watch, NYPD Blue, CSI: Miami and as Dennis Duffy in 30 Rock.

He starred in the 1999 romantic comedy Undercover Angel with Yasmine Bleeth and the 2002 direct-to-video horror film Hellraiser: Hellseeker. He played Tom in P.S. I Love You. Winters played Detective Sam Tyler's father in the US version of Life on Mars. He also played Charley Dixon, Sarah Connor's love interest, in Terminator: The Sarah Connor Chronicles.

Winters was cast in the ABC drama pilot Happy Town, from the creators of October Road, but was replaced by Steven Weber after shooting the pilot.

Winters was away from acting until 2010, when Tina Fey brought him back to 30 Rock. Also that year, Winters was introduced as "Mayhem", a recurring character in a television and radio advertising campaign for Allstate Insurance created by the advertising agency Leo Burnett Chicago. In 2019, Fey joined Winters in a series of "Mayhem" commercials.

Winters played Avi in John Wick. Winters co-starred in one season of the CBS cop drama series Battle Creek, playing a small-town police force detective opposite Josh Duhamel, the FBI resident agent assigned to the town. The series was canceled in May 2015. He had a recurring role on Brooklyn Nine-Nine as The Vulture and had a supporting role as a divorce attorney on the HBO series Divorce.

In 2018, he was cast as Mr. Town in the second season of Starz's American Gods.

In 2019, he appeared in the film Framing John DeLorean.

== Personal life ==
Winters has neuropathy, resulting in numbness and sensitivity issues in his hands and feet. In 2009, Winters contracted a bacterial infection and went into cardiac arrest. He underwent multiple surgeries and developed gangrene, resulting in the amputation of two of his toes and half of one of his thumbs. Winters is a distant cousin to American singer Dick Valentine, lead singer of the rock band Electric Six.

== Filmography ==
=== Film ===
Year	Title	Role	Notes
1997	Conspiracy Theory	Cleet	
1997	Lifebreath	Chrystie's Lover	
1999	Undercover Angel	Harrison Tyler	
2001	Snipes	Bobby Starr	
2001	Bullet in the Brain	Bank Robber	Short film
2002	Hellraiser: Hellseeker	Trevor Gooden	Direct to video
2004	Brooklyn Bound	Danny	
2004	Love Rome	Dean	
2006	Bristol Boys	Randy	
2006	Dead Calling	Nick	
2007	P.S. I Love You	Tom	
2009	Winter of Frozen Dreams	Ken Curtis	
2009	Splinterheads	Reggie	
2009	Today's Special	Steve	
2013	The Devil You Know	Jake Kelly	
2014	Don Peyote	Gun Dealer	
2014	John Wick	Avi	
2016	Teenage Mutant Ninja Turtles: Out of the Shadows	Bartender	
2017	Rough Night	Detective Frazier	
2018	After Everything	Blake	
2018	Father of the Year	Geoff	
2019	Framing John DeLorean	John Valestra	Documentary
2020	Lost Girls	Dean Bostick	
2021	Palmer	Jerry	
2021	Christmas vs. the Walters	Brian Walters	
2023	The Out-Laws	Vince Millen	
2024	ZO	Ryan O'Reily	Short film
2024	Justice League: Crisis on Infinite Earths - Part Three	Captain Storm (voice)	Direct-to-video
2025	Highest 2 Lowest	Det. Higgins	

=== Television ===
Year	Title	Role	Notes
1995–1996	Homicide: Life on the Street	Tom Marans	3 episodes
1996	NYPD Blue	Larry	Episode: "Where'd the Van Gogh?"
1996	The Playroom	Unknown	Television film
1997	Firehouse	Nick Wilkinson	Television film
1997, 1999	Millennium	Young Michael Lanyard/Mr. Crocell	2 episodes
1997–2003	Oz	Ryan O'Reily	Main role, 56 episodes
1998	New York Undercover	Paul Delaney	Episode: "Rat Trap"
1999	Sex and the City	John McFadden	Episode: "The Fuck Buddy"
1999	Saturday Night Live	Ryan O'Reily	Uncredited; Episode: "Jerry Seinfeld/David Bowie"
1999–2000, 2012–2014, 2017–2019, 2025	Law & Order: Special Victims Unit	Detective Brian Cassidy	Recurring role (seasons 1, 13–15, 19–20, 27), 32 episodes
2001	Deadline	Des Lonegan	Episode: "Shock"
2002	Third Watch	Bill Stram	Episode: "The Unforgiven"
2002	The Twilight Zone	Gordon	Episode: "Future Trade"
2004	Strip Search	Ned McGarth	Television film
2004–2007, 2009, 2011	Rescue Me	Johnny Gavin	Main role (seasons 1–4), 30 episodes; recurring role (seasons 5, 7), 3 episodes
2005	CSI: Miami	Raymond Caine	Episode: "10-7"
2006, 2008–2012	30 Rock	Dennis Duffy	Recurring role, 15 episodes; Nominated – Gold Derby Award for Best Guest Actor in a Comedy Series; Nominated – Online Film & Television Association Award for Best Guest Actor in a Comedy Series
2008	Law & Order: Criminal Intent	Mike Stoat	Episode: "Purgatory"
2008–2009	Terminator: The Sarah Connor Chronicles	Charley Dixon	Recurring role, 9 episodes
2008–2009	Life on Mars	Vic Tyler	3 episodes
2012	Up All Night	Casey Brinkley	Episode: "Preschool Auction"
2013	Westside	Robbie Carver	Television film
2013–2015, 2017, 2019	Brooklyn Nine-Nine	Detective Keith 'The Vulture' Pembroke	Recurring role, 9 episodes
2014	American Dad!	Edward	Voice role, episode: "News Glances with Genevieve Vavance"
2015	Battle Creek	Russ Agnew	Main role, 13 episodes
2016	Unbreakable Kimmy Schmidt	Bunny	Episode: "Kimmy Kidnaps Gretchen!"
2016, 2018	Divorce	Tony Silvercreek	Recurring role, 6 episodes
2017, 2019	Rapunzel's Tangled Adventure	Andrew	Voice role, 2 episodes
2019	Berlin Station	Birdman	Episode: "The Dream of the Four Policemen"
2019	Wayne	Daddy/Bobby Lucetti	Recurring role, 6 episodes
2019	American Gods	Mr. Town	Episode: "The Beguiling Man"
2019	City on a Hill	Ralph Hook	Episode: "It's Hard to Be a Saint in the City"
2021	Girls5eva	Nick	4 episodes
2022	Joe vs. Carole	Jeff Lowe	Miniseries, 3 episodes
2024	Monsieur Spade	Father Morgan	Miniseries, 2 episodes
2024	So Help Me Todd	Dick Franks	2 episodes
2026	The Fall and Rise of Reggie Dinkins	"FDNY: Chicago" Star	Episode: "Put it on Your Cabbage!"
