= Julie Martin (writer) =

American television writer and producer

- Occupations: Television writer, producer
- Writing career
- Notable work: Homicide: Life on the Street

Julie Martin is an American television writer and producer. She has worked on the NBC crime dramas Homicide: Life on the Street, Law & Order: Criminal Intent, Law & Order and Law & Order: Special Victims Unit. She won a Humanitas Prize and was nominated for a Writers Guild of America Award for her work on Homicide. She has also been nominated for an Edgar Award for her work on Criminal Intent.

Martin is an executive producer on SVU, since 2016. She originally joined the show in 2011, until she exited at the end of season 26 in 2025.

== Biography ==
Julie Martin's writing career began at UCLA, where she was originally enrolled to study medicine. Although she changed majors, she used some of her background when working as a researcher. It was during her first job working on St. Elsewhere that she met Tom Fontana with whom she'd frequently work throughout her writing career and Bruce Paltrow. Paltrow hired her to work on his next project, Home Fires.

== Writing career ==
=== 1990s ===
Martin began her television career as a writer for the seventh season of legal drama L.A. Law in 1992. She wrote or co-wrote six episodes for the season and was hired as a story editor for the eighth season in 1993 during which she wrote or co-wrote a further eight episodes. The series was canceled after completing its eighth season. Martin contributed to fourteen episodes in total as a writer.

Following the conclusion of LA Law, Martin was hired as a story editor and writer for the third season of Homicide: Life on the Street in 1994. She co-wrote seven episodes for the third season. Staff writer Bonnie Mark wrote the teleplay for the episode "Fits Like a Glove" from a story by Martin and executive producer and show runner Tom Fontana. Mark, Fontana and Martin were nominated for a Writers Guild of America Award for episodic drama at the February 1996 ceremony for writing "Fits Like a Glove". She became a producer for the fourth season in 1995.

In 1996, Martin collaborated with Fontana as a co-writer and producer on the television feature The Prosecutors. The project was co-written by Fontana and novelist Lynda La Plante. The film focused on a team of female prosecuting attorneys and starred Stockard Channing and Michelle Forbes.

Martin became a supervising producer for the fifth season of Homicide in Fall 1996. She co-wrote ten episodes for the fifth season. She remained a supervising producer for the sixth season and wrote or co-wrote a further nine episodes. She was promoted again to co-executive producer for the seventh and final season in 1998. She contributed to a further four episodes as a writer for the season and in 1999 Martin, English and Simon won a Humanitas Prize in the 60 minutes category for their work on "Shades of Gray". Martin contributed to 32 episodes as a writer over the course of the series.

=== 2000s ===
In 2002, Martin collaborated with Tom Fontana on the cable television pilot Baseball Wives for HBO. She served as a co-writer (with Lisa Randolph) and co-executive producer on the project, which is where she met Warren Leight with whom she later worked on Criminal Intent and SVU. The pilot was directed by Steve Buscemi. It was produced by HBO but was not ordered to series.

In 2004, Martin worked as a writer for the new Fox legal drama The Jury. The series was created by her Homicide colleagues Fontana, James Yoshimura and Barry Levinson. The series featured a constantly changing cast as it focused on jury deliberations for a different trial each episode. Martin wrote the teleplay for the episode "Memories" from a story by Fontana and Yoshimura. The series was canceled after ten episodes.

She co-created the college drama The Bedford Diaries in 2006 with Fontana. She worked as an executive producer and writer for the project. The show focused on classmates at New York City college. Martin contributed to five episodes as a writer. Fontana and Martin co-wrote the pilot episode "I'm Gonna Love College". Martin and Fontana co-wrote the story for four further episodes. The series aired as a mid-season replacement and was canceled after airing eight episodes.

She became a consulting producer and writer for the sixth season of NBC procedural Law & Order: Criminal Intent in 2006. Martin co-wrote eight episodes for the series' sixth season. Martin became a co-executive producer for the series seventh season in 2007. The series moved from NBC onto the USA network for the seventh season. Martin co-wrote a further eight episodes for the season. In 2008 Martin, Byrne and Warren Leight were nominated for an Edgar Award for best television episode for their work on "Senseless". Martin left the crew of Criminal Intent after the seventh season.

In 2008, Martin was hired as a co-executive producer and writer for the new NBC drama Kings. Martin wrote the episode "Judgement Day" which was directed by Homicide star Clark Johnson. She co-wrote the story for the series finale with Erik Oleson, series creator Michael Green and David Schulner co-wrote the teleplay for the finale, entitled "The New King: Part Two". The series aired as a mid-season replacement in 2009 and was canceled after airing eleven episodes.

In 2009, she produced and directed the documentary David Tudor Bandoneón! (A Combine). The film chronicled an innovative music performance by composer David Tudor in 1966.

In fall 2009, Martin became a consulting producer and writer for the twentieth season of Law & Order. Martin contributed to five episodes of the season as a writer.
