= Law & Order: Special Victims Unit season 22 =

Season of American television series

Law & Order: Special Victims Unit
- Season 22
- Season 22 U.S. DVD cover
- Starring: Mariska Hargitay; Kelli Giddish; Ice-T; Peter Scanavino; Jamie Gray Hyder; Demore Barnes
- No. of episodes: 16

Release
- Original network: NBC
- Original release: November 12, 2020 – June 3, 2021

Season chronology
- ← Previous; Season 21 Next → Season 23

The twenty-second season of the American crime-drama television series Law & Order: Special Victims Unit was ordered on February 27, 2020, by NBC. Set to air during the 2020–2021 television season, the season is produced by Wolf Entertainment and Universal Television; the showrunner is Warren Leight. The season premiered on November 12, 2020 and consists of only 16 episodes due to the COVID-19 pandemic in the United States, making it the second shortest in the series behind the twenty-fifth season. The season ended on June 3, 2021.

== Cast ==
=== Main ===
- Mariska Hargitay as Captain Olivia Benson
- Kelli Giddish as Senior Detective Amanda Rollins
- Ice-T as Senior Detective Sergeant Odafin "Fin" Tutuola
- Peter Scanavino as Assistant District Attorney Dominick "Sonny" Carisi, Jr.
- Jamie Gray Hyder as Officer / Junior Detective Katriona "Kat" Tamin
- Demore Barnes as Deputy Chief Christian Garland

=== Special guest stars ===
- Raúl Esparza as Defense Attorney (former Assistant District Attorney) Rafael Barba
- Tamara Tunie as Chief Medical Examiner Melinda Warner

=== Crossover stars from other Law & Order shows ===
- Christopher Meloni as Senior Organized Crime Control Bureau Detective Elliot Stabler from Law & Order: Organized Crime
- Annabella Sciorra as Bronx Special Victims Unit Lieutenant Carolyn Barek from Law & Order: Criminal Intent

=== Recurring ===
- Betsy Aidem as Dr. Sloane
- Erin Anderson as Counselor April Andrews
- Marisa Brau-Reyes as Defense Attorney Edwina Myerson
- Matt Buechele as Officer Donnie Jones
- Ryan Buggle as Noah Porter-Benson
- Ethan Cutkosky as Henry Mesner
- Jennifer Esposito as Sergeant Phoebe Baker
- Jorge Franco IV as Xavier Garcia, Lily's boyfriend.
- Isabel Gillies as Kathy Stabler, Stabler’s wife
- Migs Govea as Alejandro Pavel
- Ashley Taylor Greaves as Officer Gabrielle Taylor
- Bill Irwin as Dr. Peter Lindstrom
- Kathryn Kates as Judge Marlene Simons
- Aime Donna Kelly as Internal Affairs Bureau Captain Renee Curry
- Yvonna Kopacz-Wright as Dr. Darby Wilder
- Lou Martini Jr. as Defense Attorney Ron Freddo
- Elizabeth Marvel as Defense Attorney Rita Calhoun
- Michael Mastro as Judge D. Serani
- Wentworth Miller as Assistant District Attorney Isaiah Holmes
- Blake Anthony Morris as Jayvon Brown
- James Morrison as Jim Rollins
- Jessica Phillips as Defense Attorney (Ex Assistant District Attorney) Pippa Cox
- Nicola Rossi as Lily Bustani, Kat's cousin.
- Jeffrey Scaperrotta as Richard "Dickie" Stabler, Stabler’s eldest son
- Andre De Shields as Keys
- Allison Siko as Kathleen Stabler, Stabler’s second eldest daughter
- Ari'el Stachel as Sergeant Hasim Khaldun
- Aida Turturro as Judge Felicia Catano
- Will Vought as Defense Attorney Victor Franklin
- Ernest Waddell as Ken Randall
- Jasmin Walker as Defense Attorney Marame Touissant
- Stephen Wallem as Nurse Rudy Syndergaard

== Episodes ==
Law & Order: Special Victims Unit season 22 episodes
No. overall	No. in season	Title	Directed by	Written by	Original release date	Prod. code	U.S. viewers (millions)
479	1	"Guardians and Gladiators"	Norberto Barba	Teleplay by : Brendan Feeney, Denis Hamill, & Monet Hurst-Mendoza; Story by : Warren Leight & Julie Martin	November 12, 2020	2201	3.02
The Special Victims Unit are called in after a black man (Blake Morris) is accused of sexually assaulting a man as well as harassing a woman and her son in Central Park. Despite being accused, the man claims he is innocent. When a new suspect is found, the innocent man is acquitted but he quickly files a lawsuit against the Special Victims Unit, which soon makes the case extremely difficult with the community losing trust in law enforcement.
480	2	"Ballad of Dwight and Irena"	Martha Mitchell	Teleplay by : Brendan Feeney & Julie Martin; Story by : Brendan Feeney & Monet Hurst-Mendoza	November 19, 2020	2202	2.95
When a boy (Athan Sporek) is found with bruises at school, and his mother (Riki Lindhome) is found unconscious and beaten in her apartment, the Special Victims Unit are called in to investigate a likely domestic and child abuse case from the hands of the mother's boyfriend (Christopher Cassarino) with the mother's son being the main target of the abuse. Things take a sudden turn when the abuser is murdered, and the boy confesses to killing him, but things do not appear as they seem. Elsewhere, Tutuola battles on giving his deposition on a case he previously handled fatally shooting a man with his son watching.
481	3	"Remember Me in Quarantine"	Juan Campanella	Julie Martin & Warren Leight	December 3, 2020	2203	4.18
The Special Victims Unit are asked for assistance from Italian police when a young Italian woman (Brittany Conigatti) is reported missing for a month. When the woman is found dead, suspicion falls on her immature, party-throwing roommate (Jordan Lane Price) and her drug dealer friend (Jelani Alladin), who threw a party the night the woman went missing but both have no memory of that night. Meanwhile, the entire SVU squad starts to lose their patience with lockdown and quarantine as the COVID-19 pandemic continues.
482	4	"Sightless in a Savage Land"	Norberto Barba	Matt Klypka, Denis Hamill, Julie Martin, & Warren Leight	January 7, 2021	2204	3.86
On New Year's Eve, the Special Victims Unit is forced to investigate the possible kidnapping of a teenage girl. When she is found after being raped, the girl’s father murders her rapist. Carisi takes the father to court only to find that he is being represented by former ADA Rafael Barba. Meanwhile, Tutuola plans to propose marriage to a former colleague, Sergeant Phoebe Baker (Jennifer Esposito), who he previously dated but finds himself nervous about what she might answer.
483	5	"Turn Me on Take Me Private"	Juan Campanella	Teleplay by : Monet Hurst-Mendoza, Victoria Pollack, Julie Martin, & Warren Leight; Story by : Victoria Pollack & Monet Hurst-Mendoza	January 14, 2021	2205	3.83
The Special Victims Unit are called in after a webcam model (Eva Noblezada) is raped during a live cam session. The detectives soon discover that the rapist (Alex Brightman) is one of her viewers; as the case goes on, the rapist’s harassment and obsession towards the victim increases, which intimidates the victim. Meanwhile, Tamin and Carisi’s conflict reaches a new high as both clash over the case.
484	6	"The Long Arm of the Witness"	Martha Mitchell	Teleplay by : Denis Hamill & Warren Leight; Story by : Denis Hamill & Micharne Cloughley	January 21, 2021	2206	3.74
When a powerful judge (Josh Stamberg) dismisses a rape case and announces a run for New York Attorney General, Carisi investigates the judge's own history of sexual assault. However, he and the rest of the Special Victims Unit have difficulty getting some victims to come forward after their careers are threatened.
485	7	"Hunt, Trap, Rape and Release"	Batán Silva	Teleplay by : Kathy Dobie & Monet Hurst-Mendoza; Story by : Kathy Dobie & Julie Martin	February 18, 2021	2207	4.13
The Special Victims Unit team up with former Major Case Squad detective Carolyn Barek (Annabella Sciorra) who is now a lieutenant with the Bronx SVU on a serial rape case that crosses city lines. Their fraught collaboration is hampered by police malpractice and inconsistent modus operandi.
486	8	"The Only Way Out Is Through"	Martha Mitchell	Teleplay by : Micharne Cloughley & Kathy Dobie; Story by : Brianna Yellen	February 25, 2021	2208	3.78
While Benson is out dealing with a family emergency regarding Noah, the Special Victims Unit attempt to help two sisters (Crystal Lucas-Perry & Sydney Elise Johnson) get closure after one of them is raped at gunpoint while the other is forced to watch, which happened in 2000 when the two of them were teenagers. Meanwhile, Tamin's cousin (Nicola Rossi) asks for her help after being raped by her date, and a rape victim (Jane Bruce) resurfaces from seven years ago in need of Fin's help wants to get closure from her rapist, but she may get more than what she bargained for.
487	9	"Return of the Prodigal Son"	Juan J. Campanella	Warren Leight & Julie Martin	April 1, 2021	2209	8.03
Detective Elliot Stabler (Christopher Meloni) returns to New York after several years of absence, only to find his family has been put in danger. He reunites with Benson to find the perpetrator while trying to make amends with her, but the Special Victims Unit is not entirely convinced he's a changed man. After his wife dies due to the car accident, Stabler rejoins the NYPD to gain justice for his family. Note: This episode begins a crossover event that concludes on Law & Order: Organized Crime season 1 episode 1.
488	10	"Welcome to the Pedo Motel"	Jean de Segonzac	Teleplay by : Denis Hamill; Story by : Denis Hamil, Julie Martin, & Warren Leight	April 8, 2021	2210	4.89
After a teenage girl (Victoria Lily Robertson) is found murdered near a halfway house for sex offenders, the Special Victims Unit initially suspects her co-worker Lonnie Liston (Mark Cayne), a parolee living in the house. However, vigilantes take the law into their own hands and lynch Lonnie, unbeknownst to them that Lonnie was set up by someone else. Meanwhile, Rollins' father suffers a stroke.
489	11	"Our Words Will Not Be Heard"	Batán Silva	Melody Cooper	April 15, 2021	2211	4.73
Benson faces a court case regarding Jayvon Brown that could cost her her job. SVU aids an activist (Suzette Gunn) in locating her missing sister (Victoria Janicki). Meanwhile, Benson and Garland work together to try to bring change to the NYPD, and Kat catches a break when she's promoted from officer to detective.
490	12	"In the Year We All Fell Down"	Jean de Segonzac	Teleplay by : Julie Martin & Warren Leight; Story by : Julie Martin, Warren Leight, & Kathy Dobie	April 22, 2021	2212	4.50
A local restaurant owner's (Sarita Choudhury) life spirals out of control after suffering a year of COVID-related losses and setbacks when she takes her business' realtor (Andrew Polk) hostage. Benson tries to de-escalate the situation when she comes across the area but doing so reopens old wounds from her past losses. Meanwhile, Rollins' father (James Morrison) has another stroke and Carisi tries to comfort her.
491	13	"Trick-Rolled at the Moulin"	Batán Silva	Teleplay by : Brendan Feeney & Brianna Yellen; Story by : Warren Leight & Julie Martin	May 13, 2021	2213	4.45
Several wealthy men turn up dead after a trio of women drug them with a bad batch of Purple Magic, which leads Benson to a breakthrough in the case of her brother Simon's death. SVU must also team up with Stabler after they find out the drugs trace back to Richard Wheatley. Note: This episode begins a crossover event that concludes on Law & Order: Organized Crime season 1 episode 5.
492	14	"Post-Graduate Psychopath"	Norberto Barba	Teleplay by : Brianna Yellen & Micharne Cloughley; Story by : Brianna Yellen & Warren Leight	May 20, 2021	2214	4.33
Following the events of "Born Psychopath", when Henry Mesner (Ethan Cutkosky) gets released from juvenile detention after eight years, things go very personal for Detective Rollins and the SVU team fears his behavior might be a danger to others.
493	15	"What Can Happen In the Dark"	Jean de Segonzac	Micharne Cloughley	May 27, 2021	2215	4.38
Christian Garland finds his neighbor Andy unconscious at home. Blood on Andy's pants suggest that he was not injured on the job, as he says at the hospital. Benson and the squad gather clues pointing to a domestic violence case when Andy's wife tells obvious lies. It is unusual when SVU encounters a male victim of sexual abuse, and they must deal with the complications of Andy's embarrassment, his alcoholism, and the custody of the young son, when the case comes to trial.
494	16	"Wolves in Sheep's Clothing"	Norberto Barba	Teleplay by : Kathy Dobie & Christian Tyler; Story by : Denis Hamill and Julie Martin & Warren Leight	June 3, 2021	2216	4.23
The Special Victims Unit work to help a single mother who is being used for sex to live in her nice apartment. As they investigate, they discover that she is being trafficked, and they must get her to cooperate with them to find the suspects who are trafficking her. Meanwhile, Fin and Phoebe make plans for their wedding.

== Production ==
=== Development ===
Law & Order: Special Victims Unit was renewed through its twenty-second season on February 27, 2020. The season marks the return of former main cast member Meloni as Elliot Stabler since the season 12 finale. Meloni stars in the new Law & Order spin-off Law & Order: Organized Crime. He was expected to appear in the season premiere of the twenty-second season, but, due to the COVID-19 pandemic in the United States, the premiere of the spin-off was pushed back to 2021, delaying his appearance to the mid-season.

In the wake of the rise in awareness of police brutality towards people of color and racial unrest in America following the murder of George Floyd, show runner/executive producer Warren Leight said that he has been making changes in the SVU writers' room, stating that "change will start taking place on TV shows individually. There will be lip service paid". In addition to bringing on new voices, including people of color and those who have extensive history covering and writing about crime in New York, Leight said that "[They've] tried really hard in the last year to show how class and race affect the outcomes of justice in society, but I'm beginning to suspect "really hard" wasn't enough. This has to be a moment where people make themselves uncomfortable, where people in power have to make themselves uncomfortable".

On October 6, 2020, it was announced Barnes would be promoted to main cast as Deputy Chief Christian Garland; he had a recurring role on the previous season.

=== Filming ===
Filming for the season started on Monday, September 14, 2020. Two days prior, Hargitay posted two photos on her Instagram of the SVU cast and crew doing a read-through of the premiere episode script on a Zoom chat and of the script itself with the title of the episode, "Remember Me in Quarantine". On September 14, Hargitay posted two more pictures to her Instagram, one showing crew and cast members waiting in line to get COVID-19 tests and the other a photo of herself in the makeup chair with a gowned and masked makeup artist doing her hair and makeup. NBCUniversal developed a comprehensive return to work playbook, which is being followed by all of the company's series. It involves reducing shift hours and adding days to shoots to accommodate strict COVID-19 protocols. On April 27, 2021, filming for the twenty-second season concluded.

=== Storylines ===
The twenty-second season has addressed the pandemic, which led to reports of an increase in domestic abuse in New York. "We're going to reflect New York in the pandemic" and "what happens to someone who is sexually assaulted during the height of the coronavirus outbreak", said showrunner/executive producer Leight. The pandemic had a direct impact on the cast and crew, as the show lost a member of the costume department, Josh Wallwork, who died at age 45 of complications due to COVID-19.

Leight told TV Insider that in the sixth months that the series had last filmed (March 2020), New York City is "a city that has lost faith in the NYPD and the DA's office", and that the season premiere episode starts with an assault in Central Park that "quickly turns into a racially volatile situation, and [the unit] confronts how their own racial bias affects their judgment". After a case about domestic violence, the episode "Remember Me in Quarantine" turns to what happens after extended social isolation and quarantine due to COVID-19 — or, Leight said, "how close people get to their breaking points". He also told TV Insider "we hope to bring back some [more] past regulars this season", in addition to Christopher Meloni's guest return later in the season.

The series is also expected to cover police brutality towards African Americans, following the murder of George Floyd by a police officer and the subsequent global protests. Leight weighed in back in June 2020, that "we will find our way in to tell the story. Presumably our cops will still be trying to do the right thing but it's going to be harder for them and they're going to understand why it's hard for them". According to co-star Ice-T, the SVU writers have been "touched by this" incident and he thinks their emotional connection to it

...is going to show up in their writing. This one was just too brutal. This is what they call a tipping point. This is a point where people go, 'Enough!' This is a battle for humanity and human rights, it's not black and white people fighting, you know.

== Ratings ==
Viewership and ratings per episode of Law & Order: Special Victims Unit season 22
No.	Title	Air date	Rating/share (18–49)	Viewers (millions)	DVR (18–49)	DVR viewers (millions)	Total (18–49)	Total viewers (millions)
1	"Guardians and Gladiators"	November 12, 2020	0.6	3.02	0.7	2.56	1.3	5.58
2	"Ballad of Dwight and Irena"	November 19, 2020	0.5	2.95	0.6	2.17	1.1	5.12 (Note: Live+7 ratings were not available, so Live+3 ratings have been used instead.)
3	"Remember Me In Quarantine"	December 3, 2020	0.6	4.18	0.6	2.37	1.3	6.55
4	"Sightless in a Savage Land"	January 7, 2021	0.7	3.86	0.6	2.30	1.3	6.17
5	"Turn Me on Take Me Private"	January 14, 2021	0.6	3.83	0.6	2.24	1.3	6.07
6	"The Long Arm of the Witness"	January 21, 2021	0.7	3.74	0.5	1.91	1.2	5.65
7	"Hunt, Trap, Rape and Release"	February 18, 2021	0.7	4.13	0.6	2.41	1.3	6.54
8	"The Only Way Out Is Through"	February 25, 2021	0.7	3.78	0.6	2.22	1.3	6.01
9	"Return of the Prodigal Son"	April 1, 2021	1.7	8.03	0.6	2.90	2.3	10.93
10	"Welcome to the Pedo Motel"	April 8, 2021	0.9	4.89	0.7	2.54	1.6	7.43
11	"Our Words Will Not Be Heard"	April 15, 2021	0.9	4.73	0.5	—N/a	1.4	—N/a
12	"In the Year We All Fell Down"	April 22, 2021	0.8	4.50	0.6	2.36	1.3	6.86
13	"Trick-Rolled at the Moulin"	May 13, 2021	0.8	4.45	0.6	2.42	1.4	6.87
14	"Post-Graduate Psychopath"	May 20, 2021	0.7	4.33	0.6	2.30	1.3	6.62
15	"What Can Happen In the Dark"	May 27, 2021	0.7	4.38	0.7	2.47	1.3	6.84
16	"Wolves in Sheep's Clothing"	June 3, 2021	0.7	4.23	0.6	2.44	1.3	6.67
