= Guardians and Gladiators =

- Law & Order: Special Victims Unit episode
- Captain Olivia Benson (Mariska Hargitay) and Deputy Chief Garland (Demore Barnes) watching the body cam footage of Jayvon Brown's arrest.
- Episode no.: Season 22; Episode 1
- Directed by: Norberto Barba
- Story by: Julie Martin; Warren Leight
- Teleplay by: Brendan Feeney; Denis Hamill; Monet Hurst-Mendoza
- Production code: 2201
- Original air date: November 12, 2020

Guest appearances
- Blake Morris – Jayvon Brown; Peter Hargrave – Joe Murphy; Stephen Wallem – Rudy Syndergaard; Lou Martini, Jr. – Counselor Ron Freddo; Aime Donna Kelly – IAB Captain Renee Curry; Natasha Dewhurst – Trish Voort; Daniel Velasco – Mark Peter Aquino; Chevy Kaeo Martinez – Eric Aquino; Laura Hetherington – Nancy Moon; Gary Troy – Sean Donovon; Jeanine Flynn – Bernadette Murphy; Jeaniene Green – Regina Dodd; William C. Tate – Ray Gerrard; Adam Shippey – Uni #1; Keith Contreras – Uni #2; Kat Gonzalez – EMT; Christopher Riley – Dylan Reynolds; Joe Minchik – Corey; Ryan Buggle – Noah Porter Benson

Episode chronology
← Previous "The Things We Have to Lose"	Next → "Ballad of Dwight and Irena"
- Law & Order: Special Victims Unit season 22

"Guardians and Gladiators" is the first episode of the twenty-second season of the American police procedural-legal drama, Law & Order: Special Victims Unit, and the 479th overall episode of the long-running series. It originally aired on NBC in the United States on November 12, 2020. In this episode, the SVU team deals with a racially charged crime that occurs in Central Park that puts Captain Olivia Benson (Mariska Hargitay) and the squad in a fierce legal battle that has them questioning their own police methods and racial biases.

The episode's teleplay was written by Brendan Feeney, Denis Hamill, Monet Hurst-Mendoza and the story was written by Julie Martin and Warren Leight, and directed by Norberto Barba. This episode was inspired by the events of the Central Park birdwatching incident as well as events in the racially charged murder of George Floyd by officers in the Minneapolis Police Department.

"Guardians and Gladiators" was seen by 3.01 million viewers on its original airing and was the most viewed program of the night on NBC and the third-ranked program in the time slot. Critical response to the season twenty-two premiere episode was generally mixed; while many critics praised how the series portrayed bias within the NYPD, some critics did not agree with how it was handled, particularly as it concerned how Benson's potential biases were brought to light. Some critics also spoke out on how the series did not accurately and correctly portray how to adapt to the COVID-19 pandemic, specifically the ways in which the actors/characters were not wearing masks in a correct manner nor practicing proper social distancing.

== Plot ==
The squad is called into Central Park to investigate a call to police in regards to an alleged assault where they arrest a Black man named Jayvon Brown (Blake Morris) on the spot after a jogger calls 9-1-1 on what later is investigated as a false claim. As the squad continues their investigation, they realize they arrested the wrong man for the assault that did occur. Deputy Chief Christian Garland (Demore Barnes) comes to the squad room to tell Benson and Fin Tutuola (Ice-T) that Brown was suing the NYPD in a wrongful arrest lawsuit and that they were both named personally. Benson is later summoned to make a statement to Internal Affairs where Benson is forced to question decisions and arrests she made over her career that might have an unconscious racial bias. Meanwhile, with the SVU squad in pending litigation, it causes ADA Dominick "Sonny" Carisi Jr. (Peter Scanavino) problems with getting justice for the victim who was actually assaulted in the park.

== Production ==
"Guardians and Gladiators" was written by Brendan Feeney, Denis Hamill, Monet Hurst-Mendoza (teleplay) as well as executive producers Julie Martin and Warren Leight (story), and directed by Norberto Barba. In this episode, Demore Barnes (Deputy Chief Christian M. Garland) is promoted to a series regular.

On Twitter, the Wolf Films production profile tweeted that the opening scene in this episode while set in Central Park was actually filmed in a park in Yonkers. In addition for the opening scene, it took a total of 15 cameras to capture the shots, phone video, body camera, and TV reporter footage.

=== Concept and writing ===
Show runner Warren Leight told TVLine, "In our season premiere, our cops arrive at a crime in Central Park where a Black man has already been arrested. As civilians record their every move on cell phones, the squad makes a series of quick decisions that turn an already enraged community further against them. Throughout the episode, and the season, we’ll be looking at how explicit and implicit bias shape the criminal justice system, and also at how public scrutiny and anger, and internal conflicts, affect our squad." Leight elaborated further to Forbes, "All [of our] episodes are set in the aftermath of the George Floyd protests. All law enforcement actions — from arresting a black suspect on the word of a Central Park 'Karen,' to bringing a case before a distrusting Grand Jury, even to Fin's being the target of a lawsuit from the shooting at the end of last season — are now viewed through a different prism. Our team has to adjust to a new world, and has to take a hard look at their own biases."

In the midst of unrest and the pandemic, Leight also told Forbes that the SVU cast and crew were just glad to be back to work, "We were sad to end our season early, and sadder still to be off the air so long. Our show, our characters, and our city have come back strong. The episodes this fall, shot just weeks before airing, capture this moment in time with all the loss, hope, anxiety and drama that have defined 2020.”

Ice-T told TMZ Live "You're going to see Mariska['s character] deal with the challenge of 'is she racist?' We have this 'Karen' situation where we pick up this Black guy, but did we profile him? Was implicit bias involved? Why didn't we question the white lady? So I really commend 'Law & Order' for hitting these topics head on, I'm very proud to be on a show that tries to stay current and tries to stay conscious."

== Reception ==
=== Ratings ===
In its original American broadcast on November 12, 2020, "Guardians and Gladiators" was viewed by 3.01 million viewers and acquired a 0.6 rating/7% share in the age 18–49 demographic. "Guardians and Gladiators" was the most-watched program on NBC that night. It was tied the third-ranked program in that timeslot with CBS's Mom, Thursday Night Football on FOX winning the night with a 3.5 in the 18-49 age demo.

=== Critical response ===
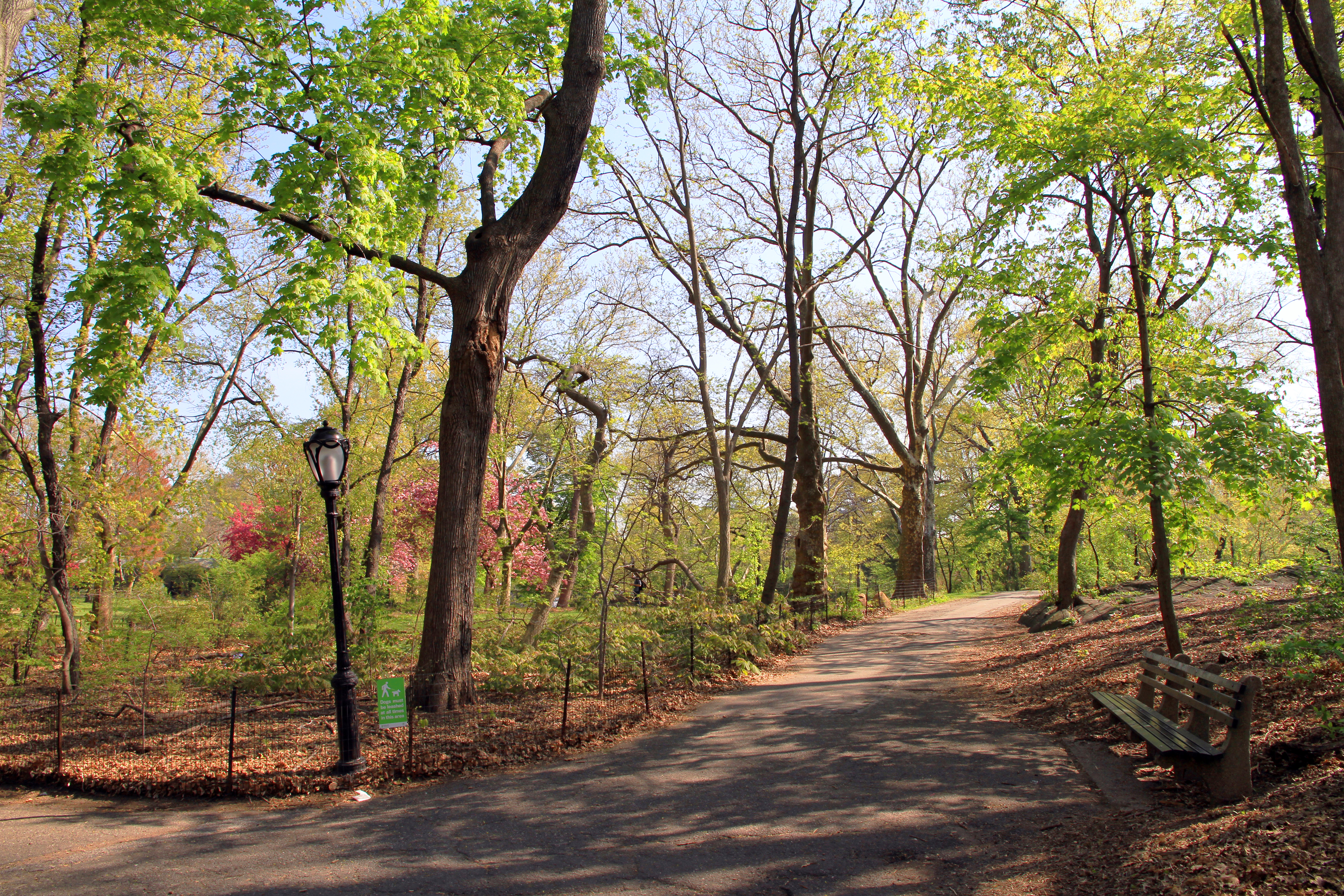
The Ramble in Central Park is where the episode was shot and is based on the birdwatching incident.

Laura Bradley at The Daily Beast commended SVU for taking a stance on racial police bias. "SVU is clearly committed to meeting the challenge head-on, primarily through its central hero Olivia Benson," she stated. "It’s clear that SVU’s writers and producers take their mandate seriously this season—and for the most part, “Guardians and Gladiators” is a fascinating look at how these shows might slowly re-imagine their roles. Still, this process is not going to be easy or seamless. SVU might’ve shifted its vantage point, but we’re still living in the same fictionalized world with the same fictional characters. We’ve known some of these characters for decades, and for all that time they have, more or less, been treated as heroes—their actions justified, their mistakes minimized, their misjudgments forgiven after generally gentle scrutiny." She continued, "Benson, Fin, and their crew are no more or less broadly representative of actual police now than they were a few years ago—but we, too, now see them in a different light. As the future continues to take shape, both on screen and in real life, it’s unclear what SVU will ultimately look like. Still, this is a fascinating first step—particularly because save for a couple questionable moments, SVU has done a good job of refusing to let its officers off the hook so far."

Neetha K. at Meaww commented, "There are a lot of eyes on crime procedurals these days and of the ones that have aired, 'Law & Order' has taken a more nuanced -- and rightful -- approach in addressing the issue. The show also took a remarkable step in making Olivia admit her own bias, but what is key will be to see whether the show will continue addressing the police's bias and systemic racism throughout not just the season, but for the remainder of the show." In a second article, Neetha pointed out that the self-revelation of Benson's potential bias left SVU viewers split on the issue on whether or not she is biased, or the extent of how much; while also noting that SVU "went much further than any other show – even its network sister show, Chicago P.D. – in looking at the systemic racism that exists in the country and within the police and how it has affected the concept of law and order in society." She went on further, "Of course, Olivia's acceptance of her own bias was met with mixed reactions. Admittedly, even if she is a fictional character, Olivia is one of the good ones -- and the way she admitted and reflected on her bias confirms that. However, some viewers found it hard to admit that Olivia might be racist – though that is not what the show intends. However, there were viewers who appreciated the direction 'Law & Order: SVU' has taken for its 22nd season and for its lead character."

TV Fanatic's Jack Ori commented on the topic of Benson's bias. "Not being a person of color, I can't speak for how viewers who experience race-based police violence in real life might have felt about this episode. [...] But from my perspective, I thought SVU did a fairly good job, not just of showing Benson's growing awareness of her own biases but also of illustrating how complicated an issue this is."

Meanwhile, Mick Joest at Cinema Blend critiqued how SVU tackled the ongoing COVID-19 pandemic, specifically how the actors/characters were wearing their masks. "Considering the location, and the fact that Law & Order: SVU is filmed in New York City, some may have assumed that the show would go the extra mile to use proper precautions. Unfortunately, the characters in the Season 22 premiere fell well short of that, frequently removing their masks and not keeping their distance to prevent the spread of illness." Joest pointed out the different scenes where characters pulled down or completely removed a mask or didn't use proper distancing. He concluded, "In a time of quarantine and pandemic, audiences are more aware than ever when a show isn't necessarily operating according to the real world. In the real world of 2020, people (hopefully) aren't removing their mask to deliver a line to strangers. [...] Hopefully, either the characters get a bit more serious with the mask use, or the series may be in for a rough couple of weeks."
