= Dale Watson (singer) =

American singer-songwriter

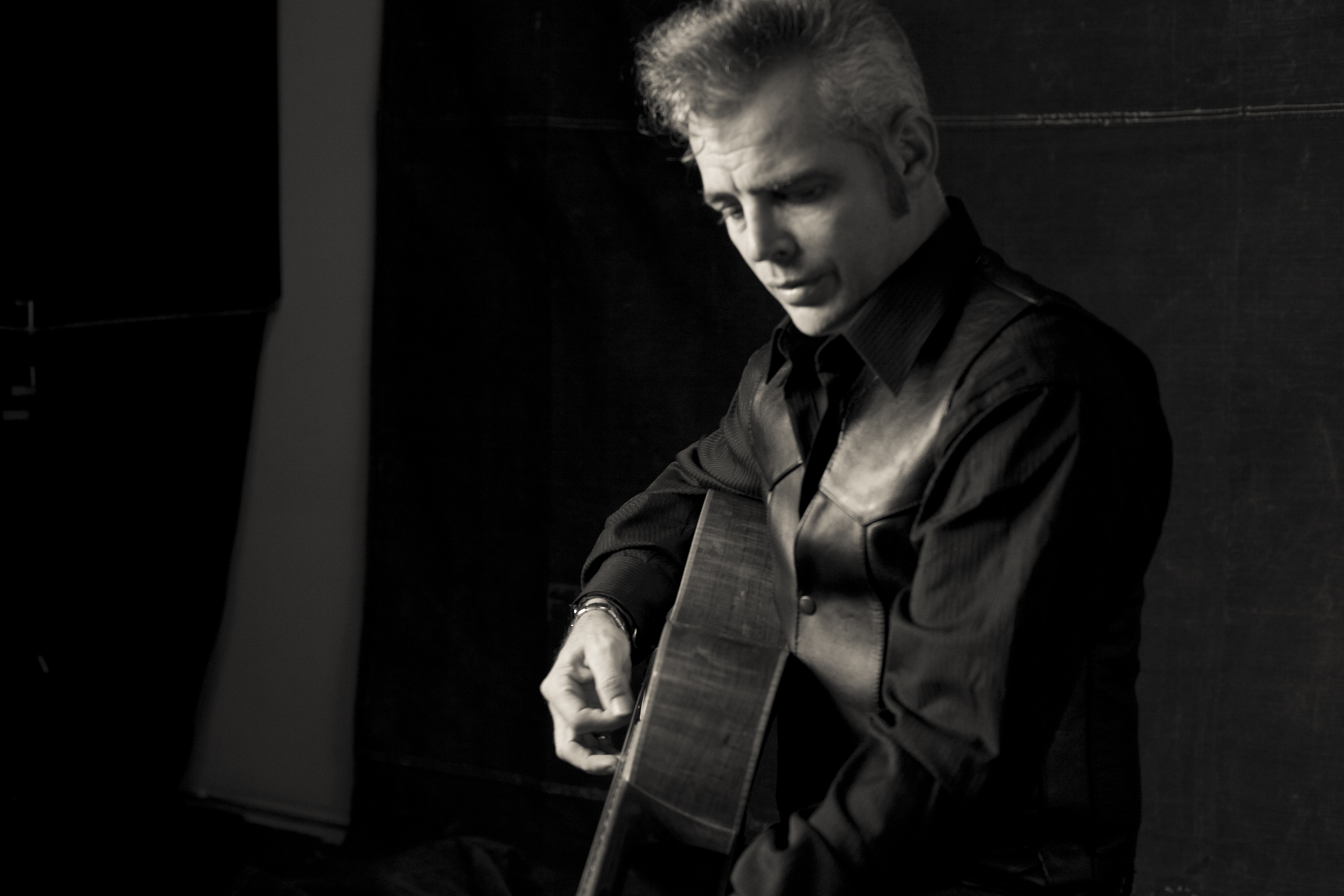

Background information
- Born: Kenneth Dale Watson; October 7, 1962 (age 64); Birmingham, Alabama, U.S.
- Genres: Country, Ameripolitan
- Occupations: Singer, songwriter
- Instrument: Guitar
- Years active: 1976–present
- Labels: HighTone, Continental Song City, Audium, Koch, Hyena, Red River, Red House, Red House/Ameripolitan (current)
- Formerly of: The Lone Stars
- Website: www.dalewatson.com

Dale Watson (born October 7, 1962) is an American country music singer, guitarist, songwriter, and self-published author based in Marshall, TX.

== Biography ==
Watson was born in Birmingham, Alabama, and moved outside of Wilmington, North Carolina, when he was less than a year old. The family moved to Pasadena, Texas, in 1977. He was one of four boys. Watson's father and his brother, Jim, were both musically inclined and guided what have become his longstanding musical influences. Watson began writing his own songs at age 12, making his first recording two years later. Soon after, Watson became an emancipated minor. By day he went to school and by night he played local Houston clubs and honky-tonks with Jim, in an aggregation called The Classic Country Band.

He moved to Los Angeles in 1988 on the advice of Rosie Flores and soon joined the house band at North Hollywood's now-legendary alt-country venue "The Palomino Club". He recorded two singles for Curb Records in 1990 and 1991, "One Tear at a Time" and "You Pour It On and I Pour It Down", and appeared on the third volume of the compilation series A Town South of Bakersfield in 1992. Not long after, he moved to Nashville and spent some time writing songs for the Gary Morris publishing company where his first daughter was born.

Watson relocated to Austin, Texas, where he formed a backing band called The Lone Stars. He scored a deal with Hightone and released his debut album, Cheatin' Heart Attack, in 1995. It was greeted with enormous acclaim for the vitality Watson brought to his vintage-style material and performances and also featured a dig at mainstream country in "Nashville Rash". Follow-up album Blessed Or Damned appeared in 1996 and continued in a similar vein, as did 1997's I Hate These Songs. His next release, The Truckin' Sessions, appeared on Koch in 1998 and was devoted entirely to that distinct country subgenre of truck-driving songs and soon after, his second daughter was born. Watson attended truck driving school about the time his first album came out and later obtained his commercial driver's license; he often drives the band bus when on tour.

The singer is also featured in the Zalman King documentary Crazy Again, chronicling Watson's breakdown after his girlfriend Terri Herbert died in a car accident in September 2000. Every Song I Write Is For You was released in 2001 as a tribute album.

After going on hiatus from music in 2004, he moved to Baltimore, Maryland to be closer to his children. His daughter appeared alongside Luke Wilson, Johnny Knoxville and Knoxville's daughter Madison in Watson's 2007 video for "Hollywood Hillbilly".

Watson returned to Austin in July 2006 and resumed playing regular gigs, including Sundays at "Ginny's Little Longhorn Saloon" and a Monday night residence at "The Continental Club". He is also a regular performer on the Grand Ole Opry. He also was the focus of a 2007 bio-picture, Austin Angel.

In 2011 Watson released a music video about Tiger Airways Australia after the company charged him $500 to transport a box of CDs which they then lost and initially refused to pay compensation.

In 2012 he starred in Stephen King and John Mellencamp's musical, Ghost Brothers of Darkland County and released The Sun Sessions (Red House Records).

In 2013 he released El Rancho Azul via Red House Records, which featured the single, "I Lie When I Drink" (which has become his signature song), helped launch Ameripolitan Music, made his first appearance on Austin City Limits (PBS), and he bought his first little honky-tonk, "The Little Longhorn Saloon" in Austin, Texas (home of "Chicken $#!+ Bingo").

In February 2014, his segment on "The Sun Sessions" aired on PBS nationally. He appeared on the Late Show with David Letterman, performing "I Lie When I Drink" in early February. In mid-February he took part in the first Annual Ameripolitan Awards Show. In July, The Truckin' Sessions Trilogy was released by Red River Entertainment, and he bought his second small honky-tonk, "The Big T Roadhouse" in St. Hedwig, Texas (where "Chicken $#!+ Bingo" is now a tradition). In November he appeared on the NPR show Wait Wait... Don't Tell Me!

In 2015 he toured in January with The Reverend Horton Heat as part of The BADDEST of The BAD Tour, in February he took part in the second Annual Ameripolitan Awards show at The Paramount Theater in Austin, Texas. In March, he appeared on Jimmy Kimmel Live! (ABC) sitting in with the house band on a night the show broadcast from Austin during South by Southwest. In early April, his first performance on Mountain Stage (NPR) aired nationally. In late May, The Truckin' Sessions, Vol. 3 was released as a stand-alone mid-line title in the US via Red River Entertainment and in Europe via Continental Record Services/CRS. His new studio album, Call Me Insane was produced by Lloyd Maines and was released worldwide on June 9 via Red House/Ameripolitan Records. The Call Me Insane Tour started on June 13 at The Broken Spoke, in Austin, Texas. Also in June, he appeared as part of a segment on The Bachlorette (ABC) on June 15. The following weekend he & His Lone Stars began touring nationally to support the album's release, selling out shows in Wichita, Kansas, Lincoln, Nebraska, Minneapolis, Minnesota, Columbus, Ohio, Cambridge, Massachusetts, etc. Segments/sessions for Daytrotter, Music City Roots, Music Fog, Sirius/XM Outlaw Country, and Texas Music Scene also aired in July. In August, he and His Lone Stars toured primarily in Texas, with highlights being The Lone Star Beer Texas Heritage Festival shows in San Antonio, Houston, Dallas, and Austin. The film Two Step also opened in New York and Los Angeles - in which Watson played a bartender. In September and October, he & His Lone Stars performed at The National Folk Festival, the Bristol Rhythm & Roots Fest and some club dates including Selma, North Carolina, before beginning a West Coast run in Columbia, Missouri at Blues N Blues N BBQ Fest that included sold out shows in Huntington Beach, California; Seattle, Washington; Bozeman, Manitoba; and Denver, Colorado. The film Lazer Team (Rooster Teeth) premiered in Austin, Texas - Watson portrayed a sportscaster. In mid-October, the new album Call Me Insane reached No. 1 on the Roots Music Report's Top 50 True Country Album Chart. It peaked at No. 3 on the FAR Chart in early Summer, No. 4 on The Alternate Root Magazine's Root 66 Chart in September, and No. 7 (twice) on the Americana airplay chart (in mid-August and again in mid-September). In November he released a song, "The Bottle Never Let Me Down" on a "limited edition" Bloodshot Records vinyl-only six-pack collection. In 2019, he played himself in Yellow Rose, director Diane Paragas' independent film.

== Personal life ==
In 2019, he reopened the bar and restaurant 'Hernando's Hide-A-Way' in Memphis, Tennessee along with his fiancé, singer/songwriter Celine Lee. Celine and Dale began exclusively seeing each other while recording her album Cat-Eyes with friend and multimedia artist Kacie Marie. Celine and Dale also co-wrote her 2017 self titled debut solo album Celine Lee.

Dale Watson married Celine Lee on June 13, 2020. They also own a 1950s Themed Airbnb called Lil Graceland in Memphis.

== Discography ==
=== Albums ===
Title	Album details	Peak chart positions	
Title	Album details	US Country	US Heat
Is There Something Wrong	Release date: 1989; Label: AM Pro Records	—	—
Cheatin' Heart Attack	Release date: 1995; Label: HighTone Records	—	—
Blessed or Damned	Release date: 1996; Label: HighTone Records	—	—
I Hate These Songs	Release date: 1997; Label: HighTone Records	—	—
The Truckin' Sessions	Release date: 1998; Label: Koch Records	—	—
People I've Known, Places I've Been	Release date: 1999; Label: Palo Duro Records	—	—
Dalevis	Release date: 2000; Label: Dale Watson Records	—	—
From the Start!	Release date: 2000; Label: Country News Records	—	—
Christmas in Texas	Release date: 2000; Label: Audium/Koch	—	—
Preachin' to the Choir (live) [2CD]	Release date: 2001; Label: Continental Song City	—	—
Every Song I Write Is for You	Release date: 2001; Label: Audium/Koch	—	—
Live in London...England!	Release date: 2002; Label: Audium/Koch	—	—
One More, Once More	Release date: 2003; Label: Continental Song City	—	—
Dreamland	Release date: 2004; Label: Koch Records	—	—
Heeah!	Release date: 2005; Label: Continental Song City	—	—
Whiskey or God	Release date: 2006; Label: Palo Duro Records	—	—
Live at Newland, NL [2CD]	Release date: 2006; Label: Me & My Americana Records	—	—
From the Cradle to the Grave	Release date: 2007; Label: Hyena Records	—	—
The Little Darlin' Sessions	Release date: 2007; Label: Koch Records	—	—
Help Your Lord	Release date: 2008; Label: Dale Watson Records	—	—
To Terri with Love	Release date: 2008; Label: Dale Watson Records	—	—
The Truckin' Sessions, Vol. 2	Release date: 2009; Label: Hyena Records	—	—
Carryin' On	Release date: 2010; Label: eOne Music/Koch	—	—
The Sun Sessions	Release date: 2011; Label: Red House Records	—	—
Dalevis: Sun Sessions 2	Release date: 2012; Label: Dale Watson Records	—	—
El Rancho Azul	Release date: 2013; Label: Red House Records	57	36
iF yoU (6-song 7-inch EP)	Release date: 2014; Label: Dale Watson Records	—	—
The Truckin' Sessions Trilogy [3CD]	Release date: 2014; Label: Red River Entertainment	—	—
The Truckin' Sessions, Vol. 3	Release date: 2015; Label: Red River Entertainment	—	—
Call Me Insane	Release date: June 9, 2015; Label: Red House/Ameripolitan Records	53	—
Chicken S#!+ Bingo: Live at the Big T Roadhouse	Release date: August 19, 2016; Label: Red House/Ameripolitan Records	—	—
Under the Influence	Release date: September 30, 2016; Label: Red River Entertainment	—	—
Dale & Ray (with Ray Benson)	Release date: January 13, 2017; Label: Ameripolitan/Home Records	—	—
Blackjack (re-recordings of his greatest hits plus 2 new songs)	Release date: December 15, 2017; Label: Red River Entertainment	—	—
Call Me Lucky	Release date: February 15, 2019; Label: Red House/Ameripolitan Records	—	—
Live Deluxe...Plus [2CD]	Release date: 2019; Label: Red River Entertainment	—	—
Dale Watson Presents the Memphians	Release date: 2021; Label: Red River Entertainment	—	—
Jukebox Fury	Release date: 2022; Label: Cleopatra	—	—
Starvation Box	Release date: 2023; Label: Cleopatra	—	—
Unwanted	Release date: 2026; Label: Forty Below	—	—
"—" denotes releases that did not chart

=== Singles ===
- "Moments Passed Me By" (AM Pro, 1984)
- "Is There Something Wrong" (AM Pro, 1989)
- "One Tear at a Time" (Curb, 1990)
- "You Pour It On and I Pour It Down" (Curb, 1991)
- "Nashville Rash" (Hightone, 1995)
- "Good Luck 'n' Good Truckin' Tonite" / "Yankee Doodle Jean" (Diesel Only, 1998)
- '"Old Fart" / "Run Away" (Evangelist Records, 2013)
- "I Lie When I Drink" / "Thanks to Tequila" (Red House, 2013)
- "Jonesin' for Jones" (Red House/Ameripolitan, 2015)
- "The Bottle Never Let Me Down" (Bloodshot, 2015)
- "Feelin' Haggard" (Ameripolitan/Home, 2017)
- "Doin' Things I Shouldn't Do" / "Johnny & June" (Need To Know Music, 2018)
- "Elvis Was a Love Affair" / "You'll Cry Too" (Midnight Sun, 2018)
- "If You're Not Here" / "Brylcreem and Vaseline" (Sleazy Records, 2019)

== See also ==
- Music of Austin, Texas
