= Annette Calud =

American actress

- Born: November 26, 1963 (age 62); Milwaukee, Wisconsin, U.S.
- Occupation: Actress
- Relatives: Eva Noblezada (niece)

Annette Calud (born November 26, 1963) is an American actress.

== Personal life ==
Calud was born on November 26, 1963, in Milwaukee, Wisconsin. Her niece is actress and singer Eva Noblezada.

== Career ==
=== Theatre ===
Calud was a member of the original Broadway production of Miss Saigon in 1991 where she was part of the Ensemble. She served as the understudy and alternate for Lea Salonga's Kim, later taking up the role full-time. She is the aunt of Eva Noblezada, who would later play the same role during the 2014 West End revival and 2017 Broadway revival.

=== Sesame Street ===
Calud played Celina, a dance teacher, on Sesame Street from 1993 until 1998.

== Television ==
| Year | Title | Role |
|---|---|---|
| 1993-1998 | Sesame Street | Celina |

== Theatre ==
| Year | Title | Role |
|---|---|---|
| 1991-1992 | Miss Saigon | Bargirl / Kim (replacement) |
