= Turn Me on Take Me Private =

Turn Me On Take Me Private
- Law & Order: Special Victims Unit episode
- Episode no.: Season 22; Episode 5
- Directed by: Juan José Campanella
- Written by: Monet Hurst-Mendoza; Victoria Pollack
- Teleplay by: Monet Hurst-Mendoza; Victoria Pollack; Julie Martin; Warren Leight
- Original air date: January 14, 2021
- Running time: 42 mins approx.

Guest appearances
- Alex Brightman as Gabe Miller; Eva Noblezada as Zoey Carrera; Emilio Delgado as Aaron Carrera; John Waters as Floyd Cougat

Episode chronology
← Previous "Sightless in a Savage Land"	Next → "The Long Arm of the Witness"
- Law & Order: Special Victims Unit season 22

Turn Me On Take Me Private is an episode of American crime drama Law & Order: Special Victims Unit. The episode is the fifth in the 22nd season. The episode tackles a case of a webcam model being sexually assaulted during a show by a fan. It includes Broadway actors Alex Brightman and Eva Noblezada in the principal guest roles of the episode. The casting of Broadway actors has come from show runner Warren Leight's plans to cast Broadway actors in SVU while Broadway is shut down.

== Premise ==
Zoey is doing a Webcam show for her fans where she spins a wheel and promises a role play scenario to be a "helpless victim" that night. After her show she visits her father Aaron who doesn’t initially recognise her due to having Alzheimer's disease. She then volunteers at a shelter before going home to do the cam show where someone comes in her window and sexually assaults her.

One of her fans, Larry who goes by "TenInchNail" goes to the police and informs Fin Tutuola and Kat Tamin of the assault as he’s recorded it on his phone. Kat asks about how he knows her but Larry highlights he keeps their relationship online. Olivia Benson and Dominick Carisi watch the interview from her office. Carisi questions whether the case is genuine due to Zoey not reporting it to the police. Kat and Benson explain to Carisi that the website Zoey cams on their representative, Floyd Cougat will only speak to him due to him being a lawyer.

Benson and Carisi go to Floyd's office and discuss parts of the case with him where Carisi hands him a warrant for Zoey's details which he complies with. Benson and Kat go to the shelter where Zoey volunteers and speak to her where she explains she was assaulted and how she joined the camming website to make ends meet during the COVID-19 pandemic. She tells them about the fantasy she was acting out when she saw the comments about someone coming in her window but the attacker didn’t rape her as he only digitally penetrated her. She doesn’t believe it was one of her fans who attacked her. They discuss some of her regular subscribers with her. Benson has Zoey discuss the attack with her subscribers where it’s revealed Gabe Miller who uses the handle "ShyGabe" was the person who attacked Zoey. Tutuola and Kat breaks in to his residence, arrests him and then shows Benson and Zoey over the webcam Gabe has a shrine to Zoey.

Tutuola and Kat interrogate Gabe at the precinct. He tells his version of story that it was consensual he then requests a lawyer to represent him. Carisi explains how the case will be hard due to prove in court due to her work as a webcammer. Tutuola and Kat discuss the case with Zoey where they inform her Gabe was stalking her wherever she went and she reveals that Gabe was the one who helped her get her dad into a care facility.

Gabe and his lawyer discuss the case with Carisi where he tries to make a deal where it appears that a deal has been struck but at arraignment, Gabe backs out of the deal and attempts to fire his lawyer so he can represent himself. The judge orders the lawyer to stay on as a secondary lawyer. He also orders that Gabe isn’t allowed to go near Zoey. Gabe then requests that he visit the crime scene to examine it, Kat confronts Carisi about this development but he can’t do anything about it. Carisi and Kat go to Zoey's apartment to support her.

At the trial, during Voir dire it’s mentioned how Gabe selected older women to be on the jury. Carisi calls Larry to the witness stand where he explains to the jury what all he watched. Gabe cross-examines him and mocks his handle. Gabe asks questions about what Zoey was planning that day. He asks Larry if he was masturbating while watching the assault. Cougat then testified that Gabe was obsessed with Zoey and had tried to get Zoey's home address. That night, Gabe arrives at Zoey's father's care home and identified himself as Zoey's boyfriend. Benson and Kat arrest him for violating the restraining order. Zoey then takes the witness box and describes the details of webcamming and what happened to her to the jury. Gabe then questions Zoey using recordings of past sessions they had together. He plays a video of her orgasming but she reveals she was faking it where she noticed the jurors judging her he then plays the video of her plans for a fantasy show he highlights that he doesn’t know what to believe and then accuses her of lying in life and accuses her of Perjury.

That evening, Carisi and Kat discuss how the case is going where they find common ground on the fact they want to get Zoey justice. Carisi decides to bring other subscribers of Zoey's to testify about the relationships and rules of camming. One of her subscribers, Rob highlights that Zoey will say whatever she’s paid to say as that’s the deal. Gabe recalls Zoey to the witness stand. He questions her about things the other subscribers said. He tries to get her to read a thing she said to him in the past but she refuses to read the comment. Atfer Gabe breaks down in court, the judge orders the court officers to remove him from the court room. His lawyer and Carisi make a deal where he will do seven years. Carisi mentions that he tried to tell Zoey but her voicemail says she’s going off the grid.

== Development ==
It was announced on 5th January 2021, that Eva Noblezada and Alex Brightman where going to guest star in an episode of SVU. It was said "Tony nominees Eva Noblezada and Alex Brightman will appear in an upcoming episode of "Law & Order: SVU," scheduled to premiere on January 14th at 9 p.m. EST on NBC! In the new episode, an online role-play session that turns violent when one user decides to meet his idol in person."

Brightman then gave an interview about the episode to BroadwayWorld where he said "I'm really hoping that audiences are uncomfortable. Art isn't always comfortable. Sometimes art is a mirror. It reflects the world around us. And right now, our world is a bit cracked. This episode deals with a woman (Eva Noblezada) who finds a way to provide for her family in a career that others may view as dirty or offensive. But it's a complicated issue portrayed in a genuinely complicated way, and I hope people see the episode and understand that sometimes human beings are more than what they do. They are who they are. And also, what you may consider sinful or unconscionable, others might consider their livelihood. Human beings contain multitudes and we have done a pretty good job at forgetting that. So I'm hoping this episode is a reminder of that."

Noblezada also discussed the episode in an interview with BroadwayWorld where she said "I still can't believe it, but I have to pretend - I shake my ass in this, okay? Under the circumstances of what they involved asked me to do, this is too much going on. If you're willing to see the episode, it does involve sexual misconduct. It does involve rape. You don't see it, thank God. But it does. So that's just a trigger warning for everybody. If you're like, "I want to see Alex Brightman and Eva Noblezada, they'll probably be singing!" No! Not this time. So that's just a trigger warning there. I do wear a lot of wigs! I wore about ten different wigs over the course of this episode, but it was fun. There was so much going on. I watched clips yesterday because I was in ADR. I was like, and why did I do that? But then I think I remember the day and being like, "Oh yeah, of course, because this is my first time doing TV and it was crazy." It's fun! I think people will be shocked. And I don't know, I kind of want people to be shocked nowadays. People are too comfortable with what's going on."

After the casting of Noblezada and Brightman was announced, showrunner Warren Leight had mentioned about the casting of them was part of him trying to give roles to Broadway actors while it was shut down due to COVID.

In an additional interview with Popculture.com, after the episode aired Brightman discussed his delight at having scenes with Mariska Hargitay and Ice-T and other regular cast members by saying "Getting cuffs put on me by the one and only Olivia Benson, it’s like, there’s nothing better… I mean, I would have been okay, I would have been totally satisfied to be a dead body in that episode. So to be able to act against the Ice-T of it all or the Jamie Hyder of it all, or especially, most of the episode is me and Peter Scanavino going back and forth." It was also said "I just had a bunch of really interesting fun for eight days,” Brightman said. “The perks of this kind of job is that all of a sudden you’re doing something that you would pay to do, first of all. I mean, it’s so much fun. Then the added bonus is, right across the way from your dressing room is f— John Waters. And you’re like, “What am I doing?” … It’s one of those ‘look at your life’ moments when you’re in the dressing room kind of, [thinking] ‘I’m hungry, I’ve been waiting here for a little too long, whatever.’ And then you feel that for about 0.5 seconds until your brain kicks in and goes, ‘Look what you’re doing. Your life is crazy. I mean, this is nuts.’ But I love this stuff."

== Reception ==
Jack Ori of TVFanatic wrote about the episode saying "Law & Order: SVU has dealt with many sex worker cases over the years, but never like this. On Law & Order: SVU Season 22 Episode 5, the squad struggled with the seemingly impossible task of proving that a webcam girl who role-plays rape fantasies for money was raped for real. They did a better job of standing up for sex workers — especially those who indulge in this kind of fantasy — than they ever have before, and that made this story that much more compelling." Ori also criticised parts of the episode in particular the ending by saying "I also didn't like that the SVU staff wasn't concerned about Zoey's wellbeing when she went off the grid. My first thought was that someone who was that introverted and afraid of her secret being unmasked could be at risk of suicide, yet the cops never considered the possibility."

Daniel S. Levine of popculture.com highlighted that the episode was "an hour full of twists and turns, anchored by special guest star performances from two of Broadway’s brightest stars. Hadestown star Eva Noblezada starred as a “cam girl” raped by one of her biggest fans, played by Beetlejuice actor Alex Brightman."
