= Eva Noblezada =

American actress and singer (born 1996)

Eva Noblezada-Carney
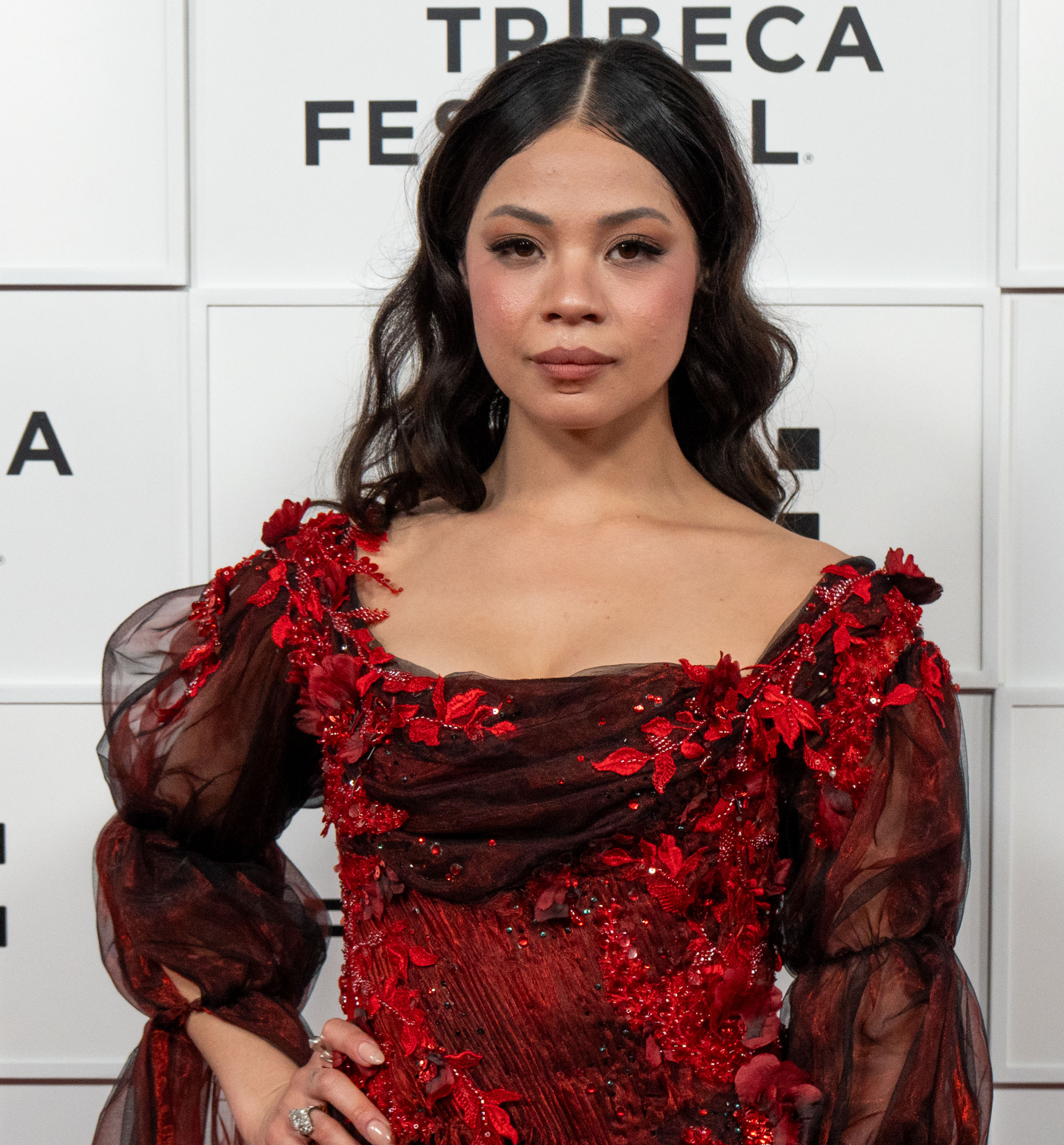
- Noblezada in 2026
- Born: Eva Maria Noblezada; March 18, 1996 (age 30); San Diego, California, U.S.
- Occupations: Actress; singer
- Years active: 2013–present
- Spouses: Leo Roberts (m. 2017; div. 2019) Reeve Carney (m. 2025)
- Relatives: Annette Calud (aunt)

Eva Maria Noblezada-Carney (née Noblezada) (/ˈiːvə ˌnoʊbləˈzɑːdə/ EE-və NOH-blə-ZAH-də; born March 18, 1996) is an American actress and singer. She is best known for her work in theatre, starring in musicals in the West End and on Broadway. Her accolades include a Grammy Award and two Tony Award nominations.

Noblezada made her professional debut as Kim in the West End revival of Miss Saigon, a performance for which she earned a WhatsOnStage Award for Best Actress in a Leading Role in a Musical. She then appeared as Éponine in the West End production of Les Misérables before reprising the role of Kim in the Broadway revival of Miss Saigon, for which she won a Theatre World Award and nominations for a Tony Award and Drama League Award. She returned to London to star as Eurydice in the original London production of Hadestown, later reprising the role in the original Broadway production, earning a Grammy Award for Best Musical Theater Album and a second Tony Award nomination. She received a second nomination for a Drama League Award for creating the role of Daisy Buchanan in the original Broadway production of The Great Gatsby. She later starred in the Broadway revival of Cabaret as Sally Bowles opposite Orville Peck as the Emcee, and reprised the role in the West End alongside her now-husband Reeve Carney, where she received her second WhatsOnStage Award nomination for Best Takeover Performance for the West End production.

On-screen, Noblezada has starred as Rose in the film Yellow Rose with her idol Lea Salonga, who she cited as an inspiration. She also provided the voice for Sam in Luck and appeared as Tala in Easter Sunday.

== Early life ==
Eva Maria Noblezada was born on March 18, 1996, in San Diego, California. Her father, Jon, is of Filipino ancestry while her mother, Angie, is of Mexican descent. Noblezada's paternal grandparents are from Maguindanao and Iloilo. She and her family moved to Charlotte, North Carolina, where she attended the Northwest School of the Arts until she was 17. Her aunt is Annette Calud, who played Celina on Sesame Street and Kim in Miss Saigon on Broadway.

== Career ==
On July 1, 2013, Noblezada became one of five finalists for the 2013 National High School Musical Theatre Awards. Her performance of the song "With You" from Ghost during the awards ceremony at the Minskoff Theatre in New York City was noted by casting director Tara Rubin, who arranged an audition for Noblezada, then 17, before producer Cameron Mackintosh for the forthcoming West End revival of Miss Saigon. Noblezada was cast in the lead role of Kim.

In the spring of 2014, Noblezada left the Northwest School of the Arts in Charlotte to star in Miss Saigon in London. For her performance as Kim, Noblezada won the 2015 WhatsOnStage Award for Best Actress in a Leading Role in a Musical. She performed "I'd Give My Life for You" at the 2015 Laurence Olivier Awards ceremony.

Following the limited run of Miss Saigon in London, Noblezada assumed the role of Éponine in the West End production of Les Misérables from April to December 2016.

On May 2, 2016, Noblezada made her Carnegie Hall debut, celebrating Alain Boublil and Claude-Michel Schönberg, performing "The Movie in My Mind" with Lea Salonga and The New York Pops.

Noblezada reprised her performance as Kim in the first Broadway revival of Miss Saigon, which opened at the Broadway Theatre on March 23, 2017, for a limited run through January 14, 2018. For her performance, Noblezada was nominated for the 2017 Tony Award for Best Actress in a Leading Role in a Musical, becoming one of the youngest nominees in the category, at age 21.

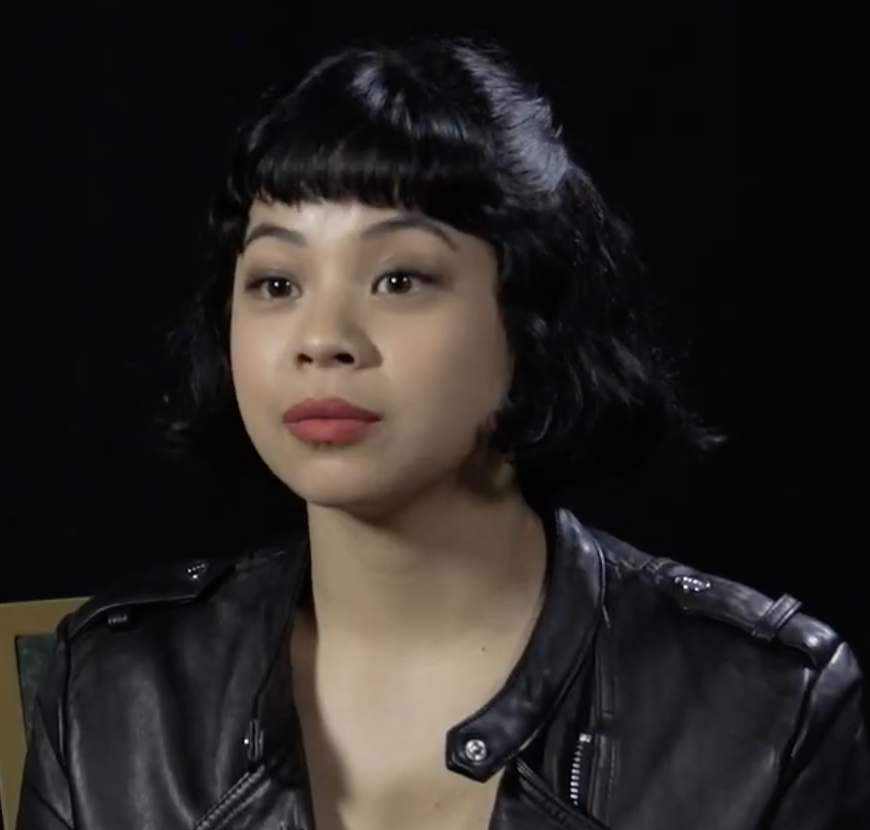
Noblezada-Carney in 2019

She played the role of Ayla in the musical Vanara in a London workshop presentation on May 11, 2018. In November 2018, Noblezada opened in the lead role of Eurydice in the Royal National Theatre's production of the musical Hadestown. She continued in the role of Eurydice when the production transferred to Broadway's Walter Kerr Theatre in April 2019. She received her second Tony Award nomination for her role and won the Broadway.com Audience Choice Award for Favorite Leading Actress in a Musical. Noblezada played her final performance in the role on August 13, 2023.

Noblezada made her film debut in the Diane Paragas film Yellow Rose (2019) as the titular character, Rose. She starred alongside her idol Lea Salonga, who originated the role of Kim in Miss Saigon. The film was released by Sony Pictures Stage 6 on October 9, 2020. In 2022, she starred in the film Easter Sunday, featuring an all-Filipino cast. In 2022, Blogtalk with MJ Racadio named her one of the "75 Most Influential Filipino-Americans".

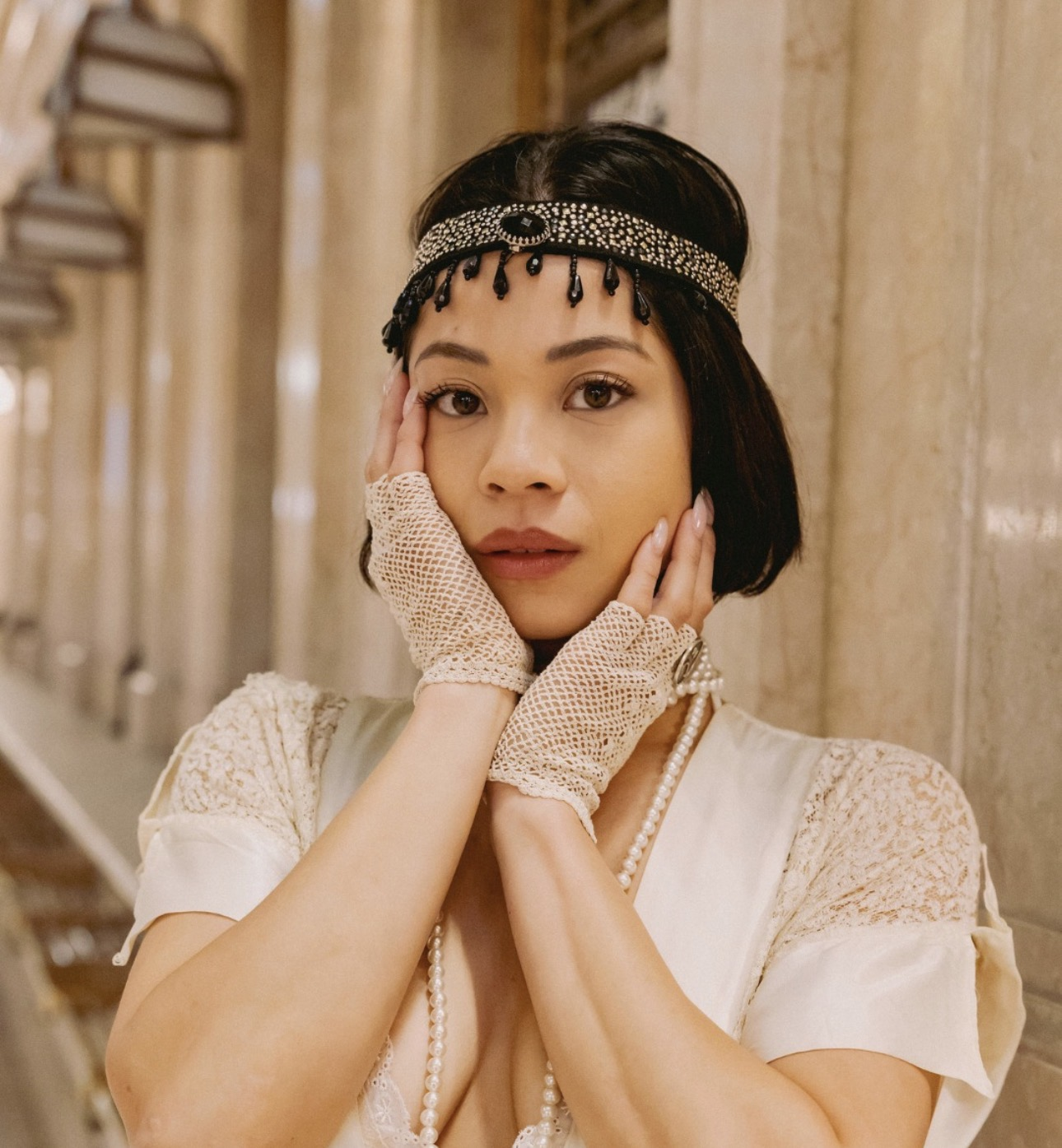
Eva Noblezada doing a photo shoot to promote ''The Great Gatsby'' on Broadway

In October 2023, Noblezada starred as Daisy alongside Jeremy Jordan and later her husband Reeve Carney as Gatsby in the world premiere of The Great Gatsby at the Paper Mill Playhouse. Both Noblezada and Jordan reprised their roles in the original Broadway production, which began previews in March 2024 and opened in April of the same year at the Broadway Theatre. She played her final performance on January 30, 2025 opposite Ryan McCartan as Gatsby.

From February to March 2025, it was announced that Noblezada, opposite Carney and her other original Broadway cast co-stars Patrick Page, Amber Gray, and André De Shields would reprise their roles in the West End production of Hadestown for a limited four-week run. The show was professionally filmed during their time in the West End.

On 31 March 2025, Noblezada joined the cast of the Broadway revival of Cabaret as Sally Bowles for a limited engagement, opposite Orville Peck as the Emcee. Noblezada replaced Auliʻi Cravalho in the role. She left the Broadway production on 20 July 2025 and was replaced by Marisha Wallace. She reprised the role in the West End production from 22 September 2025 for a limited season, alongside her husband and former Hadestown co-star Reeve Carney as the Emcee.

== Personal life ==
Noblezada has been vocal about her personal struggles with anxiety, depression, bulimia, and body dysmorphic disorder. She announced her marriage to English actor Leo Roberts in November 2017; they divorced in 2019.

After her first marriage ended, Noblezada entered a romantic relationship with her Hadestown co-star Reeve Carney. They announced their engagement on March 14, 2025, and were married October 27, 2025 in New Orleans, Louisiana.

== Acting credits ==
=== Theatre ===
Year	Title	Role	Theatre	Category	Notes	Ref.
2014–2016	Miss Saigon	Kim	Prince Edward Theatre, West End	West End revival	Original cast	
2016	Les Misérables	Éponine Thénardier	Queen's Theatre, West End	Original West End production	Replacement	
2017–2018	Miss Saigon	Kim	Broadway Theatre, Broadway	Broadway revival	Original cast	
2018–2019	Hadestown	Eurydice	Royal National Theatre, London	Original London production	Original cast	
2019–2020	Hadestown	Eurydice	Walter Kerr Theatre, Broadway	Original Broadway production	Original cast	
2021–2023	Hadestown	Eurydice	Walter Kerr Theatre, Broadway	Original Broadway production	Original cast	
2023	The Great Gatsby	Daisy Buchanan	Paper Mill Playhouse, Millburn	Regional tryout	Original cast	
2024–2025	The Great Gatsby	Daisy Buchanan	Broadway Theatre, Broadway	Original Broadway production	Original cast	
2025	Hadestown	Eurydice	Lyric Theatre, West End	Original West End production	Replacement	
2025	Cabaret	Sally Bowles	August Wilson Theatre, Broadway	Broadway revival	Replacement	
2025–2026	Cabaret	Sally Bowles	Playhouse Theatre, West End	West End revival	Replacement	
2026	The Great Gatsby	Daisy Buchanan	Broadway Theatre, Broadway	Original Broadway production	Replacement	

=== Film ===
Year	Title	Role	Notes
2016	Miss Saigon: 25th Anniversary	Kim	Live recording of staged performance
2019	Yellow Rose	Rose Garcia	Feature film debut
2022	Champ	Genevieve	Short film
2022	Luck	Sam Greenfield (voice)	
2022	Easter Sunday	Tala	
2024	Lola	Mena	Short film
2026	Hadestown: The Musical	Eurydice	Filmed stage production

=== Television ===
Year	Title	Role	Notes
2021	Law & Order: Special Victims Unit	Zoey Carrera	Episode: "Turn Me on Take Me Private"

== Accolades ==
Year	Award	Category	Work	Result	Ref.
2017	Broadway.com Audience Choice Award	Favorite Breakthrough Performance	Miss Saigon	Nominated	
2019	Broadway.com Audience Choice Award	Favorite Leading Actress in a Musical	Hadestown	Won	
2019	Broadway.com Audience Choice Award	Favorite Onstage Pair (with Reeve Carney)	Hadestown	Nominated	
2024	Broadway.com Audience Choice Award	Favorite Performance of the Year (Musical)	The Great Gatsby	Nominated	
2024	Broadway.com Audience Choice Award	Favorite Leading Actress in a Musical	The Great Gatsby	Won	
2024	Broadway.com Audience Choice Award	Favorite Onstage Pair (with Jeremy Jordan)	The Great Gatsby	Nominated	
2025	Broadway.com Audience Choice Award	Favorite Replacement (Female)	Cabaret	Won	
2017	Drama League Award	Distinguished Performance	Miss Saigon	Nominated	
2024	Drama League Award	Distinguished Performance	The Great Gatsby	Nominated	
2020	Grammy Award	Best Musical Theater Album	Hadestown	Won	
2019	Los Angeles Asian Pacific Film Festival	Best Breakthrough Performance	Yellow Rose	Won	
2013	Jimmy Award	Best Performance by an Actress	Footloose	Top 3	
2017	Tony Award	Best Actress in a Leading Role in a Musical	Miss Saigon	Nominated	
2019	Tony Award	Best Actress in a Leading Role in a Musical	Hadestown	Nominated	
2017	Theatre World Award		Miss Saigon	Honoree	
2015	WhatsOnStage Award	Best Actress in a Leading Role in a Musical	Miss Saigon	Won	
2026	WhatsOnStage Award	Best Takeover Performance	Cabaret	Pending	

== See also ==
- Filipinos in the New York metropolitan area
