= Yellow Rose (2019 film) =

2019 musical drama film

- Theatrical release poster
- Directed by: Diane Paragas
- Written by: Diane Paragas; Annie Howell; Celena Cipriaso
- Produced by: Cecilia R. Mejia; Rey Cuerdo; Diane Paragas; Orian Williams; Jeremiah Abraham
- Starring: Eva Noblezada; Dale Watson; Princess Punzalan; Lea Salonga
- Cinematography: August Thurmer
- Edited by: Iron Reiter; Taylor Levy
- Music by: Christopher Hoyt Knight
- Production companies: ABS-CBN Global; Cinematografo Originals; Home Away Productions; Civilian Studios
- Distributed by: Sony Pictures Releasing (Note: Sony Pictures Releasing distributed in the US and Canada via Stage 6 Films, Star Cinema distributed in the Philippines, and Sony Pictures Releasing International distributed worldwide.)
- Release dates: May 2, 2019 (Los Angeles Asian Pacific Film Festival); October 9, 2020 (United States)
- Running time: 94 minutes
- Countries: United States; Philippines
- Languages: English; Filipino
- Box office: $367,849

Yellow Rose is a 2019 musical drama film co-written and directed by Diane Paragas. An international co-production film among the Philippines and United States, it is produced by Cecilia R. Mejia, Diane Paragas, Rey Cuerdo, Orian Williams, and Jeremiah Abraham. The film stars Eva Noblezada, Dale Watson, Princess Punzalan, and Lea Salonga. The plot follows Rose, a Filipina undocumented immigrant, who dreams of leaving her small town in Texas to pursue her country music dreams. Her plan is put on hold when her mother is taken by Immigration and Customs Enforcement and Rose is forced to flee to Austin, Texas.

The film premiered at the Los Angeles Asian Pacific Film Festival on May 2, 2019 and received positive reviews. Stage 6 Films acquired the film and released it on October 9, 2020.

== Plot ==
In a small town in Texas. Rose Garcia, a young undocumented Filipina Girl, lives with her mother, Priscilla, who works at a motel. Rose aspires to become a musician, while her mother wishes her to study as a promise to her late father.

Rose visits her friend, Elliot, who works at a music shop. He invites her to Austin, and Rose then asks her mother for permission, which her mother denies. In Rose's frustrated absence, Priscilla vents about her failed attempt to hire an Immigration Lawyer as they left with the money she gave them for legal citizenship through her late husband.

Later, Rose and Elliot trick Priscilla into thinking both of them are going to church when, in reality, they are driving to Austin. While driving their way there, Elliot hands Rose a fake ID and encourages her to practice singing.

As Rose and Elliot arrive in Austin, they arrive at a bar called the Broken Spoke and engage in underage drinking. Rose then encounters country singer Dale Watson, who is impressed by Rose's knowledge of music and later she dances with Elliot.

After Rose and Elliot's bender, they return to find Priscilla is being arrested by Immigration and Customs Enforcement. They escape and later return to the hotel to recover Priscilla's belongings, among them is a letter to Rose regarding her aunt, Gail, who claims she has the power of attorney and could help provide her legal citizenship.

As Rose arrives at her aunt Gail's house, she learns that Gail is unaware of Priscilla's situation, which is attributed to their growing estrangement.

Priscilla is then interrogated by immigration, who claims she is in line for deportation due to her failed attempts at complying.

Rose later overhears Gail and her husband, Mark, arguing about her situation, to which Mark does not want to be involved, as he fears that his family will be arrested. Rose, believing her presence will become a burden to them, leaves, but not while Gail gives her own phone number and money to Rose.

Rose is later sheltered at the Broken Spoke, courtesy of Jolene, a bartender she met earlier. While this is happening, Rose receives a call from Priscilla, who initially thinks Rose is with her aunt, only to explain her current situation. Priscilla is upset and embarrassed for not telling about her sister's estranged relationship. Rose then works at the Broken Spoke with another employee named Jose, and they later bond because of their undocumented status.

Afterwards, Rose is then greeted again by Dale Watson, who teaches her more about the guitar. Jolene also acknowledges her talent and encourages her to sing.

Rose receives another call from Priscilla, who begs her to stay with Gail; if she refuses, she insists that she be deported with her back to Manila. Rose is deeply conflicted by this but is visited by Elliot. Rose spends the night heavily drinking before she is tucked to sleep by Elliot.

The same night, Immigration and Customs Enforcement raids the Broken Spoke. Jose and another worker are captured while Rose is left alone because of a sympathetic immigration agent.

In the morning, Rose meets with Jolene, who informs her that she is unable to keep her sheltered, but aids her by giving her the contact of Dale Watson, and later lives in his trailer. Dale then encourages her to write a song based on her experiences and hardships.

Later on, Elliot visits Rose and asks about her mother. Rose replies by saying that Priscilla is expected to be deported. Her current options are to either stay and wait for her DACA to renew or return with her mother to Manila.

Rose then arrives at a detention center with Elliot's cousin as her chauffeur and is reunited with Priscilla, where they have a brief heart-to-heart. Priscilla explains her situation within the detention center, claiming its dehumanizing treatment of immigrant women. However, their visit is cut short, and Rose leaves. Later at night, Rose and Dale begin practicing a song, much to Rose's frustration.

Nearing the end of summer, Rose struggles to create a demo. She vents to Dale, recounting her love of country music as well as her experiences of stage fright when playing at a talent show, where people called her Yellow Rose. Dale, however, encourages her to try anyway.

Later on, Dale sets up a small gathering where he and Rose sing in front of a crowd that includes Elliot and Jolene. Jolene later records her singing at a sound studio while Priscilla is escorted and later deported back to Manila.

Afterwards, Dale gifts Rose a new guitar, but is later informed that Rose's living situation has become troublesome as her mother has been deported, and her aunt is unable to assist. Rose asks if Dale could adopt her as an attempt to stay within the U.S., but Dale rejects, since he believes the situation was temporary. Rose, upset, leaves a pleading Dale and seeks out shelter elsewhere. Priscilla is now seen back in the Philippines, while Rose struggles to get by until she stops by a motel.

Rose now works as a motel cleaner and later receives a call from her mother, telling Rose she misses her. Rose breaks down to Priscilla, saying she had to sell her guitar as she struggles to afford living. Priscilla asks why Rose won't come home, to which Rose says, " This is home for me". After the call, Rose visits Dale again, and the two reconnect to write a song.

The end of the film shows Rose setting up a concert, where she reunites with Elliot, and the two share a passionate kiss before the show starts. Rose and Dale play "I Ain't Going Down" together as Elliot and Jolene watch, as well as Gail, who displays the show to Priscilla and Rose's cousins back in the Philippines.

== Cast ==
- Eva Noblezada as Rose Garcia
- Lea Salonga as Gail Garcia
- Dale Watson as himself
- Princess Punzalan as Priscilla Garcia
- Gustavo Gomez as Jose
- Libby Villari as Jolene
- Liam Booth as Elliot Blatnik

== Production ==
In May 2019, it was announced that the film would premiere at the Los Angeles Asian Pacific Film Festival (LAAPFF) on May 2, 2019. Director and screenplay writer Diane Paragas told reporters that the film has been in the works since 2004. It was also announced that Paragas would sing on the soundtrack as well as Eva Noblezada, Lea Salonga, and Dale Watson.

Principal photography began in Austin, Texas and Manila, Philippines on August 17, 2018. Filming wrapped in January 2019.

== Soundtrack ==
The soundtrack of the film was released by Sony Music Masterworks on October 9, 2020.

All tracks are written by Christopher Hoyt Knight except where noted.

No.	Title	Writer(s)	Performer(s)	Length
1.	"Square Peg"	Dale Watson, Thia Megia, Diane Paragas	Eva Noblezada	4:05
2.	"Life Out on the Road"	Watson	Watson	2:00
3.	"Dahil Sa Iyo"	Mike Velarde, Jr.	Lea Salonga	2:01
4.	"Circumstance"	Watson	Noblezada; Watson	1:21
5.	"Quietly Into the Night"	Paragas	Noblezada; Watson	1:59
6.	"I Ain't Going Down"	Watson	Noblezada; Watson	2:13
7.	"Yellow Rose"	Watson	Watson	1:42
8.	"Are You Priscilla Garcia"		Knight	2:16
9.	"Running Through Hayfield"		Knight	2:26
10.	"We Could Have Used Your Help"		Knight	1:19
11.	"N35"		Knight	1:04
12.	"Leaving Tita Gail's"		Knight	1:37
13.	"Rose and Elliot"		Knight	1:00
14.	"Rose Leaves Broken Spoke"		Knight	1:02
15.	"They Take Everything Away"		Knight	1:16
16.	"This is Home For Me"		Knight	2:28
17.	"Yellow Rose (Instrumental)"	Watson	Watson	1:43
Total length:				32:00

== Release ==
Yellow Rose premiered at the LAAPFF on May 2, 2019. It was screened at several other film festivals internationally. It won thirteen film festival awards, particularly praising Paragas' directing and Noblezada and Salonga's performances. Though the film's theatrical release was delayed due to the COVID-19 pandemic, it was released on October 9, 2020. The film is one of the first Filipino-American films to be released by a major Hollywood studio for theatrical release.

== Reception ==
=== Box office ===
Yellow Rose opened in 9th place at the US box office, taking in $150,000 in 900 theaters over its opening weekend.

=== Critical reception ===
On review aggregator Rotten Tomatoes, the film has an approval rating of 87% based on 55 reviews, with an average of 7.2/10. The site's critical consensus reads, "A coming-of-age story with a timely twist, Yellow Rose offers a fresh -- and sweetly rewarding -- perspective on the immigrant experience." On Metacritic, the film has a weighted average score of 71 out of 100, based on 13 critics, indicating "generally favorable reviews". Writing for The Philippine Reporter, Ysh Cabana wrote "Yellow Rose is the Filipino-American filmmaker’s response to the harsh reality of 21st Century America’s anti-immigrant policies."

A film critic for Minorities Report Film wrote "Yellow Rose is a much needed film that reminds everyone that we are surrounded by people that might be living in sorrow and pain"

New York Times said Paragas "spins a story that is both politically timely and personal...the music has the greatest staying power..."

=== Accolades ===
Year	Association	Category	Recipient	Result	Ref.
2019	Los Angeles Asian Pacific Film Festival	Best Narrative Feature	Yellow Rose	Won	
2019	Los Angeles Asian Pacific Film Festival	Best Breakthrough Performance	Eva Noblezada	Won	
2019	Bentonville Film Festival	Best Competition Narrative	Yellow Rose	Won	
2019	Asian American International Film Festival	Best Narrative Feature	Yellow Rose	Won	
2019	CAAMFest	Best Narrative	Yellow Rose	Won	
2019	Urbanworld Film Festival	Best Film	Yellow Rose	Won	
2019	Urbanworld Film Festival	Best Narrative Feature	Yellow Rose	Won	
2019	Austin Film Festival	Marquee Feature	Yellow Rose	Nominated	
2019	Philadelphia Asian American Film Festival	Best Narrative Feature Film	Yellow Rose	Won	
2019	San Diego Asian Film Festival	Audience Award	Yellow Rose	Won	
2019	Toronto Reel Asian International Film Festival	Menkes Audience Choice Award	Yellow Rose	Won	
2019	Toronto Reel Asian International Film Festival	Fasken Martineau Best Feature Film	Yellow Rose	Won	
2019	Vancouver Asian Film Festival	Best Overall Feature	Yellow Rose	Won	
2019	Hawaii International Film Festival	Best Narrative Feature	Yellow Rose	Won	
2021	Houston Film Critics Society Awards	Texas Independent Film Award	Yellow Rose	Won	
2021	Guild of Music Supervisors Awards	Best Music Supervision for Films Budgeted Under $5 Million	Yellow Rose	Nominated	
