= Law & Order: Special Victims Unit season 21 =

Season of American television series

Law & Order: Special Victims Unit
- Season 21
- Season 21 U.S. DVD cover
- Starring: Mariska Hargitay; Kelli Giddish; Ice-T; Peter Scanavino; Jamie Gray Hyder
- No. of episodes: 20

Release
- Original network: NBC
- Original release: September 26, 2019 – April 23, 2020

Season chronology
- ← Previous; Season 20 Next → Season 22

The twenty-first season of the American crime-drama television series Law & Order: Special Victims Unit premiered on Thursday, September 26, 2019, on NBC and concluded on April 23, 2020. This made the series the longest-running American prime-time drama in history. The season is produced by Wolf Films and Universal Television; the showrunner being Warren Leight.

This season is the first not to feature Philip Winchester as Peter Stone since his introduction in the nineteenth season, following his departure at the conclusion of the previous season.

On March 13, 2020, the production of the twenty-first season was suspended due to the COVID-19 pandemic in the United States. Twenty out of the original twenty-four episode order were completed before production was suspended. The twentieth episode served as the season finale.

== Cast ==
=== Main ===
- Mariska Hargitay as Lieutenant / Captain Olivia Benson
- Kelli Giddish as Senior Detective Amanda Rollins
- Ice-T as Senior Detective Sergeant Odafin "Fin" Tutuola
- Peter Scanavino as Assistant District Attorney Dominick "Sonny" Carisi, Jr.
- Jamie Gray Hyder as Officer Katriona "Kat" Tamin (episodes 8–20, recurring episodes 1, 4–7)

=== Recurring ===
- Betsy Aidem as Dr. Sloane
- Erin Anderson as Defense Attorney April Andrews
- Demore Barnes as Deputy Chief Christian Garland
- Lauren Biazzo as Detective Marina Cruz
- Ami Brabson as Judge Karyn Blake
- Stephen C. Bradbury as Judge Colin McNamara
- Marisa Brau-Reyes as Defense Attorney Edwina Myerson
- Matt Buechele as Officer Donnie Jones
- Ryan Buggle as Noah Porter-Benson
- Robert John Burke as Captain Ed Tucker
- Charlotte Cabell & Vivian Cabell as Jesse Rollins
- Erica Camarano as Officer Rachel Ortiz
- Tom Coiner as Officer Chuck Inslow
- Vincent Curatola as Judge Al Bertuccio
- Peter Gallagher as Deputy Chief William Dodds
- Ashley Taylor Greaves as Officer Gabrielle Taylor
- Amy Hargreaves as Dr. Alexis Hanover
- Peter Hermann as Defense Attorney Trevor Langan
- Yvonna Kopacz-Wright as Dr. Darby Wilder
- Kecia Lewis as Judge Constance Copeland
- Mouzam Makkar as Defense Attorney Dara Miglani
- Sonia Manzano as Judge Gloria Pepitone
- Michael Mastro as Judge Serani
- Lou Martini Jr. as Defense Attorney Ron Freddo
- Marissa Matrone as Judge Maria Ana DeFeceo
- Edelen McWilliams as Crime Scene Unit Technician Martin
- Olga Merediz as Judge Roberta Martinez
- Lindsay Pulsipher as Kim Rollins
- Zuleikha Robinson as Bureau Chief Assistant District Attorney Vanessa Hadid
- Jeremy Russial as Defense Attorney Robert Kluger
- Jeffrey Schecter as Defense Attorney Art Blumfeld
- Ari'el Stachel as Sergeant Hasim Khaldun
- Jenna Stern as Defense Attorney Elana Barth
- Joseph Lyle Taylor as Defense Attorney Mickey D’Angelo
- Michael Tow as Defense Attorney Josh Wang
- Tamara Tunie as Chief Medical Examiner Melinda Warner
- Aida Turturro as Judge Felicia Catano
- Nicholas Turturro as Detective Frank Bucci
- Ernest Waddell as Ken Randall
- Jasmin Walker as Defense Attorney Marame Touissant
- Stephen Wallem as Nurse Rudy Syndergaard
- Michael Weston as Simon Marsden
- Delaney Williams as Defense Attorney John Buchanan

=== Guest ===
On July 9, 2019, it was announced Jenna Stern would reprise her role as Elana Barth in the season premiere. On July 13, 2019, Leight revealing that Peter Gallagher would also reprise his role as Deputy Chief William Dodds in the first episode of the season. Ian McShane guest-starred in the season premiere, as "a charming and high-profile media mogul who takes on Olivia Benson and the SVU squad after being accused of sexual assault". On July 30, 2019, it was announced that Ariel Winter would guest star in the second episode of the season, titled "The Darkest Journey Home". On August 23, 2019, it was announced that Amy Hargreaves would recur as Dr. Alexis Hanover, a psychologist tasked with teaching the team a new technique, which requires each of them to recall past traumas from their own lives. On October 4, 2019, it was confirmed that Demore Barnes would recur as the new Deputy Chief of SVU Christian Garland, who is described as intelligent and analytical and immediately makes an impression on the detectives during his first case. Dorothi Fox appeared in the sixth episode, titled "Murdered at a Bad Address", as a patient. Margaret Cho appeared in the seventh episode of the season, titled "Counselor It's Chinatown", as a massage-parlor manager swept up in a sex-trafficking sting operation.

== Episodes ==
Law & Order: Special Victims Unit season 21 episodes
No. overall	No. in season	Title	Directed by	Written by	Original release date	Prod. code	U.S. viewers (millions)
459	1	"I'm Going to Make You a Star"	Norberto Barba	Warren Leight & Peter Blauner	September 26, 2019	2101	3.84
The Special Victims Unit investigates an attempted rape accusation made by an aspiring young actress (Carmen Berkeley) against Sir Tobias Moore (Ian McShane), a powerful media mogul. The investigation becomes intense, and Benson soon finds herself in the middle of a cat-and-mouse game between herself and Moore. Meanwhile, several changes happen to the Special Victims Unit precinct as Carisi becomes the precinct’s new assistant district attorney, and Benson is promoted to Captain by Dodds, who is transferred to Traffic and Safety Task Force in Staten Island.
460	2	"The Darkest Journey Home"	Jean de Segonzac	Julie Martin & Warren Leight	October 3, 2019	2102	3.44
A terrified and traumatized young woman (Ariel Winter) claims she was raped, which prompts the Special Victims Unit to investigate. Benson works with her to help her remember the details of the rape and her rapists. Meanwhile, a psychologist visits the Special Victims Unit precinct and teaches Benson, Rollins, and Tutuola a new witness interview technique that will help with future cases, which involves the detectives facing their past traumatic experiences while experiencing the technique.
461	3	"Down Low in Hell's Kitchen"	Timothy Busfield	Teleplay by : Monet Hurst-Mendoza & Brendan Feeney; Story by : Lisa Takeuchi Cullen, Julie Martin, & Warren Leight	October 10, 2019	2103	3.42
The Special Victims Unit are called to investigate when a soon-discovered "closeted gay" Black celebrity (L. Steven Taylor) claims he was raped. Currently, the SVU team is searching for a serial rapist who only targets gay, professional, well-off, married Black men who live "on the down low", or in secret. The celebrity appears to fit the victims' profile. However, as time goes on,9 the squad become suspicious of the celebrity’s story, believing he may not be telling the truth about being attacked. Meanwhile, the Special Victims Unit meet their new Deputy Chief, Christian Garland, who immediately makes an impression on the squad. Also, before weekly baseball practice Noah surprises Benson by disclosing that he actually hates baseball and finds it boring. She asks what he would prefer doing and he points to a dance studio with a huge window showing a group of dancers having fun. He tells her that's what he would like to be doing instead of playing ball.
462	4	"The Burden of Our Choices"	Martha Mitchell	Teleplay by : Julie Martin & Micharne Cloughley; Story by : Warren Leight & Julie Martin	October 17, 2019	2104	3.46
A 13-year-old runaway girl (Kira McLean) from Ohio is found safe and her Evangelical Christian mother and step father want to immediately take her home. However, SVU is called in when they learn she is pregnant and came to New York specifically for a legal abortion due to the new (2019) restrictive anti-abortion legislation passed in Ohio. Her parents clash with the SVU, particularly Rollins, over beliefs and rights and refuse to cooperate, which leads Rollins to suspect there are dark secrets in the family. Shocking family secrets are soon discovered. Amidst the chaos, Rollins accompanies the young teen to a clinic for the emotionally difficult procedure. Meanwhile, the squad gets together for the baptism of Rollins’ youngest, Billie, and Officer Katriona "Kat" Tamin transfers in as a detective-in-training, having assisted on a past case.
463	5	"At Midnight in Manhattan"	Peter Werner	Teleplay by : Kathy Dobie & Micharne Cloughley; Story by : Brianna Yellen	October 24, 2019	2105	3.73
The Special Victims Unit find themselves busy one Friday night with three separate cases involving a woman, Joelle, being brutally raped and beaten by her husband, a transgender woman, Lakira Baca, being raped by a high society man, Paul Davies, she met that night and a young wealthy woman raped by a ride share driver. The detectives find themselves stressed with the heavy workload, particularly Tamin who struggles with investigating her case with Akira and mostly Rollins, who lashes out at Carisi, claiming she is upset that he left SVU as a detective and became an assistant district attorney.
464	6	"Murdered at a Bad Address"	Michael Smith	Teleplay by : Denis Hamill; Story by : Denis Hamill, Julie Martin, & Warren Leight	October 31, 2019	2106	3.98
The Special Victims Unit are called in to investigate after a teenage girl is sexually assaulted in the projects. DNA from the rape kit is linked to a double murder from 16 years ago and the case from 2003 is re-opened after discovering the man imprisoned, Carlos, for the murder of his mother and sister may very well be innocent. Meanwhile, Benson has a surprise reunion with her troubled brother, Simon Marsden, who wishes to get to know Noah. Unfortunately, after 5 years of sobriety, Simon dies of an accidental drug overdose, leaving Benson devastated.
465	7	"Counselor, It's Chinatown"	Leslie Hope	Teleplay by : Kathy Dobie & Lisa Takeuchi Cullen; Story by : Julie Martin & Warren Leight	November 7, 2019	2107	3.59
When an Asian human sex trafficking ring is discovered by the Special Victims Unit after a rape victim claimed to have been a victim of the ring’s actions, the detectives go undercover to bust the human sex trafficking ring alongside a fellow detective. Meanwhile, tensions grow between Hadid and the Special Victims Unit as Hadid starts to prove more difficult to work with after she blames the detectives for not arresting the victim to imprison the pimps.
466	8	"We Dream of Machine Elves"	Jonathan Herron	Teleplay by : Brendan Feeney & Monet Hurst-Mendoza; Story by : Julie Martin & Warren Leight	November 14, 2019	2108	3.79
The Special Victims Unit are called in when a young woman is found raped and drugged to the point where she is in a psychotic state. The detectives soon realise that there are several victims linked to the same case and are led to an unconventional and unethical therapist (Adam Arkin) with a secret past. In order to catch him in the act, Rollins goes undercover as an aspiring student and admirer of the therapist and discovers several shocking things.
467	9	"Can't Be Held Accountable"	Norberto Barba	Teleplay by : Brianna Yellen; Story by : Julie Martin & Warren Leight	November 21, 2019	2109	3.81
The Special Victims Unit gets a request from Frank Bucci (Nick Turturro), a retired NYPD detective, to stop Steve Getz (Vincent Kartheiser), a wealthy, prominent business man whom he believes is a sexually predator who is grooming his two teenage daughters. In an attempt to catch him in the act, Tamin goes against Benson’s orders and goes undercover as the girls' aunt. The detectives soon arrest Getz despite the girls pleas not to. As the trial moves along, a change in judges occurs and the new judge dismisses or diminishes all charges and Getz becomes a free man. An angry Bucci then takes matters into his own hands and kidnaps Rollins for leverage, putting her in extreme danger.
468	10	"Must Be Held Accountable"	Laurie Collyer	Teleplay by : Brianna Yellen & Denis Hamill; Story by : Warren Leight & Julie Martin	January 9, 2020	2110	3.70
During Rollin's ordeal after being kidnapped by an enraged Frank Bucci in retaliation for Getz not being charged for raping his daughters, the SVU team both try to track Rollins’ location and investigate why such an obviously guilty man like Getz was not charged. They soon discover that the replacement judge who acquitted Getz, as well as Getz’s defense attorney, may be hiding some sinister secrets themselves which may be the reason why Getz was acquitted. Rollins and Bucci are found unharmed and Getz and his main accomplice are arrested as they try to board a private jet. They are put in jail while awaiting trial. Getz pulls a cowardly move, permanently cancelling his trial and taking away the right for his many underaged victims to have their day in court.
469	11	"She Paints for Vengeance"	Mariska Hargitay	Teleplay by : Kathy Dobie; Story by : Kathy Dobie & Julie Martin	January 16, 2020	2111	3.60
The Special Victims Unit investigate the sexual assault of a stripper. The stripper, Monica Russo, is angry due to her case being dismissed before by a detective who believed the case wasn’t valid because she was a stripper, which makes her difficult to work with. When trial comes, Carisi deals with the rapist’s attorney, former judge Elana Barth, who is tough and harsh in the courtroom. Meanwhile, Rollins struggles to get over the trauma from her ordeal with Bucci.
470	12	"The Longest Night of Rain"	Michael Smith	Teleplay by : Peter Blauner; Story by : Peter Blauner & Warren Leight	January 30, 2020	2112	3.63
While celebrating Tucker’s retirement party, a police officer (Holly Robinson Peete) walks in uninvited and makes a scene. The Special Victims Unit soon discover that she was raped by a former Internal Affairs officer that Tucker cleared and they launch an investigation, which starts roughly when the police officer commits suicide. Meanwhile, Tucker confides in Benson, disclosing some devastating news about his health which ends in complete tragedy.: The episode is followed by a public service announcement that reads: If you are in emotional distress, call the National Suicide Prevention Lifeline at 1-800-273-8255; It's free, confidential, and available 24/7.
471	13	"Redemption in Her Corner"	Batán Silva	Teleplay by : Monet Hurst-Mendoza & Brianna Yellen; Story by : Julie Martin & Warren Leight	February 6, 2020	2113	3.25
A boxing coach comes under suspicion of statutory rape after Tamin suspects that he is having sexual relations with a sixteen year old girl. Tamin steps over the line several times, which frustrates Benson. The case takes an unexpected turn when one of the coach's students assaults the coach and the detectives dig into the students troubled past, which reveals years of broken family trust and damage.
472	14	"I Deserve Some Loving Too"	Jean de Segonzac	Teleplay by : Denis Hamill; Story by : Denis Hamill, Julie Martin, & Warren Leight	February 13, 2020	2114	3.32
The Special Victims Unit arrest an ICE Agent on charges on rape after an undercover sting operation. However, the detectives are led to his boss, who they discover is trading green cards for sex despite the women not wanting to have sex. Meanwhile, Rollins and a Sergeant involved in the case become close when the Sergeant takes Rollins out to a romantic dinner.
473	15	"Swimming with the Sharks"	Martha Mitchell	Teleplay by : Lisa Takeuchi Cullen; Story by : Lisa Takeuchi Cullen, Warren Leight, & Julie Martin	February 20, 2020	2115	3.36
The Special Victims Unit investigate the alleged rape of the CEO of a company (Radha Mitchell). Upon catching the accused, the case takes a bizarre twist when he accuses the CEO of crying rape to hide the fact she was stealing money from the company. They are soon led to the CEO’s business partner who claims that the CEO raped her and the detectives soon discover that everyone involved in the case is hiding something.
474	16	"Eternal Relief from Pain"	Jean de Segonzac	Peter Blauner	February 27, 2020	2116	3.30
Amanda Rollins reunites with her sister Kim after three years of no contact. Amanda is shocked that Kim now has a son and also learns that Kim is possibly facing time in prison. Kim asks for Amanda's help because she is being sexually extorted by her doctor for narcotics. Amanda and the SVU team investigate Kim’s doctor, who may be sexually extorting not just Kim but several other women for narcotics.
475	17	"Dance Lies and Video Tape"	Leslie Hope	Teleplay by : Micharne Cloughley & Brendan Feeney; Story by : Brendan Feeney, Julie Martin, & Warren Leight	March 26, 2020	2117	3.80
When a surveillance video of two ballet dancers sharing an intimate moment is uploaded to a pornography website, the Special Victims Unit is called in after the female dancer claims no consent was given for the video to be uploaded and begs for it to be taken down. The detectives soon meet a ballet teacher who may be a serial predator using his ballet dancers for more than just ballet but also for sexual pleasuring.
476	18	"Garland's Baptism by Fire"	Norberto Barba	Cheryl L. Davis & Micharne Cloughley	April 2, 2020	2118	3.53
When a member of Garland’s church is arrested for embezzlement charges, the Special Victims Unit are led to the church’s Reverend, who may not only be responsible for embezzlement but also for the statutory rape of several teenage girls. Garland, Benson and the squad battle with their emotions due to the charges and the Reverend’s wife standing by her husband and expressing her anger towards Garland and the SVU detectives.
477	19	"Solving for the Unknowns"	Christopher Misiano	Brianna Yellen & Kathy Dobie	April 16, 2020	2119	4.06
The Special Victims Unit tackle a hard case trying to capture a serial rapist that uses a date rape drug to assault his victims while they are under the influence of the drug. With little to no evidence of his attacks, the detectives struggle to find the rapist and make an arrest. Meanwhile, Rollins is finally promoted to a 2nd Grade detective.
478	20	"The Things We Have to Lose"	Juan Campanella	Warren Leight & Julie Martin	April 23, 2020	2120	3.69
As Sir Toby Moore (Ian McShane) is finally brought to trial, the SVU detectives face difficult challenges with past cases. Tamin meets up with Lakira Baca again who alerts her that Paul Davies has raped another transgender woman, Rollins is reunited with Ivy Bucci after arresting her for cocaine possession at a party and Tutuola’s career is put in jeopardy after fatally shooting a father who attempted to murder his wife and son.

== Production ==
=== Development ===
Law & Order: Special Victims Unit was renewed for a twenty-first season on March 29, 2019. Production for the season started on July 9, 2019. On April 23, 2019, it was announced Warren Leight, who was showrunner for the series' thirteenth-seventeenth seasons, would return to the series as showrunner, while Michael S. Chernuchin would become showrunner for another Dick Wolf show, FBI. On July 9, 2019, Leight posted a photo on Twitter revealing the first episode's title "I'm Going to Make You a Star". On November 4, 2019, it was announced that Jamie Gray Hyder would be promoted to main cast as Detective-in-training Katriona Tamin from the eighth episode. Hyder had a recurring role from the start of the season.

=== Special ===
An hour-long retrospective, The Paley Center Salutes Law & Order: SVU, aired on January 2, 2020.

== Ratings ==
Viewership and ratings per episode of Law & Order: Special Victims Unit season 21
No.	Title	Air date	Rating/share (18–49)	Viewers (millions)	DVR (18–49)	DVR viewers (millions)	Total (18–49)	Total viewers (millions)
1	"I'm Going to Make You a Star"	September 26, 2019	0.7/4	3.84	0.8	2.99	1.5	6.83
2	"The Darkest Journey Home"	October 3, 2019	0.7/3	3.44	0.8	2.91	1.4	6.36
3	"Down Low in Hell's Kitchen"	October 10, 2019	0.6/3	3.42	0.8	2.82	1.4	6.24
4	"The Burden of Our Choices"	October 17, 2019	0.6/3	3.46	0.7	2.85	1.4	6.31
5	"At Midnight in Manhattan"	October 24, 2019	0.6/3	3.73	0.8	2.84	1.4	6.57
6	"Murdered at a Bad Address"	October 31, 2019	0.7/4	3.98	0.7	2.74	1.4	6.72
7	"Counselor, It's Chinatown"	November 7, 2019	0.6/3	3.59	0.8	2.95	1.4	6.54
8	"We Dream of Machine Elves"	November 14, 2019	0.7/4	3.79	0.8	2.94	1.5	6.74
9	"Can't Be Held Accountable"	November 21, 2019	0.7/4	3.81	0.8	2.80	1.4	6.62
10	"Must Be Held Accountable"	January 9, 2020	0.7/4	3.70	0.8	2.91	1.5	6.61
11	"She Paints for Vengeance"	January 16, 2020	0.6/4	3.60	0.8	2.76	1.4	6.36
12	"The Longest Night of Rain"	January 30, 2020	0.6/4	3.63	0.8	3.06	1.4	6.69
13	"Redemption in Her Corner"	February 6, 2020	0.6/4	3.25	0.6	2.74	1.3	5.92
14	"I Deserve Some Loving Too"	February 13, 2020	0.7/4	3.32	0.8	2.89	1.4	6.22
15	"Swimming with the Sharks"	February 20, 2020	0.7/4	3.36	0.7	2.90	1.4	6.27
16	"Eternal Relief from Pain"	February 27, 2020	0.6/4	3.30	0.8	2.79	1.4	6.10
17	"Dance Lies and Video Tape"	March 26, 2020	0.7/4	3.80	0.7	2.74	1.5	6.55
18	"Garland's Baptism by Fire"	April 2, 2020	0.6/3	3.53	0.7	2.63	1.3	6.17
19	"Solving For The Unknowns"	April 16, 2020	0.7/4	4.06	0.8	2.76	1.5	6.83
20	"The Things We Have To Lose"	April 23, 2020	0.7/3	3.69	0.7	2.73	1.4	6.40
