= Jamie Gray Hyder =

American actress and model (born 1985)

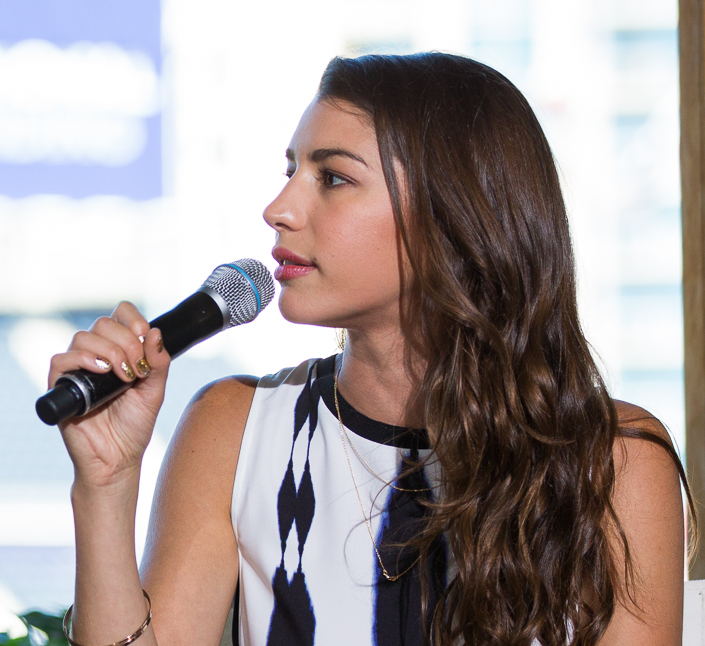
- Hyder at the 2016 San Diego Comic-Con
- Education: J. E. B. Stuart High School
- Occupation: Actress
- Years active: 2009–present
- Spouse: Michael Trotter (m. 2021)
- Modeling information
- Agency: LA Management

Jamie Gray Hyder is an American actress. She performed voice and motion capture work for the role of Lieutenant Nora Salter in Call of Duty: Infinite Warfare and voice acted for the operator Roze in Call of Duty: Modern Warfare. She also played Lucia Solano in season 2 of Graceland, and the werewolf Danielle in Seasons 5 and 6 of True Blood. Hyder starred as Detective Katriona "Kat" Tamin on Law & Order: Special Victims Unit from 2019 to 2021.

== Early life and education ==
Hyder is of Lebanese descent on her father's side and attended J. E. B. Stuart High School in Falls Church, Virginia and the University of Georgia.

== Career ==
Hyder portrayed Echo in the 2013 first-person shooter video game Killzone: Shadow Fall, the first such game produced by Guerrilla Games in the Killzone series made for Sony's PlayStation 4 console.

In 2014, she starred opposite Andrew Keegan and Ray Liotta in the music video for "Lovers on the Sun", the lead single from David Guetta's sixth studio album Listen. The Wild West-themed music video was directed by Marc Klasfeld.

In 2016, she played Lt. Nora Salter in Call of Duty: Infinite Warfare, which debuted November 4.

In 2019, Hyder joined the cast of Law & Order: Special Victims Unit in its 21st season as Officer Katriona "Kat" Tamin, initially recurring before being promoted to series regular beginning with the season’s eighth episode. She departed the series shortly into its 23rd season.

== Personal life ==
Hyder married actor Michael Trotter in June 2021.

== Filmography ==
Film
Year	Title	Role	Notes
2010	The Gallon Challenge	Erin Roberts (as Jamie Hyder)	
2017	Sandy Wexler	Adult Jesse	
2018	Nightmare Cinema	Nurse Chloe (segment "Dead")	
2018	Fall (Short)	Customer	
2019	Better Days	Jessica	
2022	Green Lantern: Beware My Power	Hawkgirl (voice)	
2024	Justice League: Crisis on Infinite Earths	Hawkgirl, young Diana (voice)	

Television
Year	Title	Role	Notes
2010	Sons of Tucson	Esparanza	Episode: "Family Album"
2012–2013	True Blood	Danielle	11 episodes
2014–2015	Graceland	Lucia Solano	13 episodes
2016	NCIS	Navy Petty Officer First Class Heidi Orr	Episode: "Sister City: Part 1"
2016	Bones	Alex Duffy	Episode: "The Movie in the Making"
2016	Rizzoli & Isles	Donna Marks	Episode: "65 Hours"
2017–2018	Voltron: Legendary Defender	Zethrid	Voice, 14 episodes (season 3–8)
2017	Criminal Minds	Kimberly Desmond	Episode: "Blue Angel"
2017	Inhumans	Jen	3 episodes
2018	The Resident	Grace Brooks	Episode: "None the Wiser"
2018	Chicago Med	ASA Ramirez	Episode: "Down by Law"
2018	The Last Ship	Nina Garside	3 episodes
2019–2021	Law & Order: Special Victims Unit	Officer/Detective Katriona "Kat" Tamin	Main role (seasons 21–23)
2021	Sugar Plum Twist	Natalia	Television film (Hallmark)
2024	The Equalizer	Jenna	Episode: "The Fight for Life"

Video games
Year	Title	Role	Notes
2013	Killzone: Shadow Fall	Echo	Voice
2016	Call of Duty: Infinite Warfare	Lieutenant Nora Salter	Voice and motion capture
2019	Call of Duty: Modern Warfare	Roze	Voice
2019	Need for Speed Heat	Player (female)	Voice and character model (Caucasian female option)

Music videos
Year	Title	Artist	Role	Notes
2009	"A Dustland Fairytale"	The Killers	Principal	
2009	"Face Drop"	Sean Kingston	Principal	
2009	"Heartbreak Warfare"	John Mayer	Principal	
2010	"Heart Heart Heartbreak"	Boys Like Girls	Principal	
2010	"Hot-n-Fun"	N.E.R.D	Principal	
2014	"Lovers on the Sun"	David Guetta	Principal	
