= Diane Paragas =

American film and television director

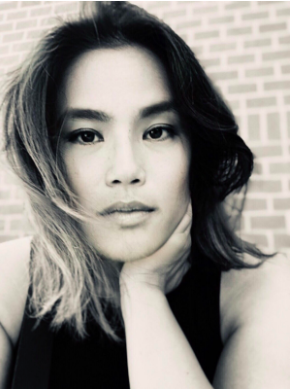
- Paragas in Brooklyn 2019
- Education: University of Texas at Austin
- Occupation: Filmmaker
- Years active: 2005-present
- Children: 1

Diane Paragas is a Filipino-American documentary and narrative film and commercial director. She is best known for writing, directing and producing the 2020 film Yellow Rose. Yellow Rose was Paragas' debut narrative feature. The film was selected as the Opening Night Film of the 2019 Los Angeles Asian Pacific Film Festival. Yellow Rose won Grand Jury Prizes at LAAPFF, Bentonville Film Festival, CAAMFEST37, and Urbanworld where it also took the Audience Award. The film also won the Audience Award at the Hawaii International Film Festival.

Her 2011 documentary film Brooklyn Boheme was about the African Arts movement that documented the careers of Spike Lee, Chris Rock, Branford Marsalis, and Rosie Perez, and more. It was the opening night film for the 2011 Urbanworld Film Festival and premiered on Showtime. The film won the Black Reel Outstanding TV Documentary Award. Paragas co-directed the film with Nelson George as well as serving as a producer, editor and cinematographer.

Paragas is currently developing a feature documentary The Three Lives of David Wong, which was selected for Sundance Creative Producing Lab and won the CAAM Documentary for Social Change grant.

Paragas was selected as a 2020 Creative Capital Awardee. In March 2021, the Philippine Consulate General honored Diane Paragas with a Distinguished Filipino Women in New York award. In 2022 she was named a United States Artists (USA) Fellow.
